= 2026–27 Swindon Town F.C. season =

148th season in existence of Swindon Town FC

Swindon Town
2026–27 season
- Owner(s): Clem Morfuni; Hollie Kiely; Bethany Parlodorio
- Chairman: Clem Morfuni
- Manager: Ian Holloway
- Stadium: County Ground
- EFL Cup: First round
| Home colours | Away colours | Third colours |

The 2026–27 season is the 148th season in the history of Swindon Town Football Club and their sixth consecutive season in League Two. In addition to the domestic league, the club would also participate in the FA Cup, the EFL Cup, and the EFL Trophy.

== Transfers and contracts ==
=== In ===
| Date | Pos. | Player | From | Fee | Ref. |
|---|---|---|---|---|---|
| 1 July 2026 (Note: The transfer was announced on 17 June, and would become official on July 1 once Clark's contract at Port Vale expired.) | RB | (Wales) Mitch Clark | (England) Port Vale | Free | |
| 1 July 2026 (Note: The transfer was announced on 23 June, and would become official on July 1 once Negru's contract at Oxford United expired.) | CB | (Moldova) Stephan Negru | (England) Oxford United | Free | |
| 1 July 2026 (Note: The transfer was announced on 29 June, and would become official on July 1 once Virtue's contract at Fleetwood Town expired.) | CM | (England) Matty Virtue | (England) Fleetwood Town | Free | |
| 6 August 2026 | CB | (Australia) Kaelan Majekodunmi | (Australia) Olympic Kingsway | Free | |
| 28 August 2026 | CM | (Scotland) Jack Thomson | (Scotland) Kilmarnock | Undisclosed | |
| 1 September 2026 | CF | (England) Antwoine Hackford | (England) AFC Wimbledon | Undisclosed | |

=== Loaned in ===
| Date | Pos. | Player | From | Loaned until | Ref. |
|---|---|---|---|---|---|
| 2 July 2026 | CB | (England) James Debayo | (England) Hull City | End of Season | |
| 3 August 2026 | RW | (England) Joseph Hungbo | (England) Wigan Athletic | End of Season | |
| 3 August 2026 | CB | (Northern Ireland) Sam Inwood | (England) Bolton Wanderers | End of Season | |
| 14 August 2026 | CAM | (Australia) Jaylan Pearman | (England) Queens Park Rangers | End of Season | |
| 17 August 2026 | CM | (England) Anthony Munda | (England) Newcastle United | End of Season | |
| 1 September 2026 | LB | (England) Dan Butler | (England) Stevenage | End of Season | |

=== Loaned out ===
| Date | Pos. | Player | To | Date until | Ref. |
|---|---|---|---|---|---|
| 6 August 2026 | CB | (Democratic Republic of the Congo) Filozofe Mabete | (England) Forest Green Rovers | 2 January 2027 | |
| 7 August 2026 | CB | (England) Sonny Hart | (England) Enfield Town | | |
| 26 October 2026 | CB | (England) Teddy Moulder | (England) Melksham Town | 26 November 2026 | |
| 26 October 2026 | CM | (England) Josh Terry | (England) Swindon Supermarine | 26 November 2026 | |

=== Out ===
| Date | Pos. | Player | To | Fee | Ref. |
|---|---|---|---|---|---|
| 18 June 2026 | CM | (England) Darren Oldaker | (England) Southend United | Undisclosed | |
| 24 July 2026 | CF | (England) Jake Tabor | (England) Hemel Hempstead Town | Undisclosed | |

=== Released / Out of Contract ===
| Date | Pos. | Player | Subsequent club | Joined date | Ref. |
|---|---|---|---|---|---|
| 30 June 2026 | LB | (England) Owen Foye | (England) Evesham United | 1 July 2026 | |
| 30 June 2026 | CM | (England) Kian Larkins | (England) Didcot Town | 1 July 2026 | |
| 30 June 2026 | GK | (England) Lucas Myers | (Wales) Haverfordwest County | 1 July 2026 | |
| 30 June 2026 | CB | (England) Will Wright | (England) Barnet | 10 July 2026 | |
| 30 June 2026 | CB | (Republic of Ireland) Ryan Delaney | (England) Oldham Athletic | 13 July 2026 | |
| 30 June 2026 | GK | (England) Redman Evans | (England) Alvechurch | 14 July 2026 | |
| 30 June 2026 | CB | (England) Finlay Tombs | (England) Thatcham Town | 21 July 2026 | |
| 30 June 2026 | CAM | (England) Harry Gray | (England) Coventry City | 23 July 2026 | |
| 30 June 2026 | RB | (England) Charlie Betts | (England) AFC Totton | 27 July 2026 | |
| 30 June 2026 | LB | (England) Jake Batty | (England) Fleetwood Town | 28 July 2026 | |
| 30 June 2026 | CAM | (Spain) Dani González | (United States) Missouri State Bears | 29 July 2026 | |
| 30 June 2026 | CM | (England) Jaxon Brown | (England) Romford | 31 July 2026 | |
| 30 June 2026 | CB | (England) Antony McCormick | (England) Evesham United | 1 August 2026 | |
| 30 June 2026 | GK | (England) Anton Robinson | (England) Walthamstow | 3 August 2026 | |
| 30 June 2026 | CB | (England) Harrison Minturn | (England) Bath City | 7 August 2026 | |
| 30 June 2026 | CF | (England) George Alston | (England) Hungerford Town | August 2026 | |
| 30 June 2026 | RW | (Wales) Billy Bodin | (England) Gosport Borough | 30 September 2026 | |
| 30 June 2026 | CM | (England) Francis Abijo | | | |
| 30 June 2026 | LW | (Canada) Junior Hoilett | | | |
| 30 June 2026 | CF | (England) Joseph Owiti | | | |

=== New Contract ===
| Date | Pos. | Player | Contract expiry | Ref. |
|---|---|---|---|---|
| 9 May 2026 | CM | (England) Ollie Clarke | 30 June 2027 | |
| 10 May 2026 | GK | (England) Lewis Ward | 30 June 2027 | |
| 12 May 2026 | CB | (England) Ryan Tafazolli | 30 June 2027 | |
| 14 May 2026 | CF | (England) Harry Smith | 30 June 2027 | |
| 26 May 2026 | LB | (England) Billy Kirkman | 30 June 2027 | |
| 1 July 2026 (Note: The contract was announced on 18 June, and would officially begin on July 1.) | GK | (England) Charlie Summers | 30 June 2028 (Note: First professional contract) (Note: Option for a further year) | |
| 13 August 2026 | CAM | (Germany) Paul Glatzel | 30 June 2029 | |
| 14 August 2026 | CB | (England) Lucas Griffiths-Brown | 30 June 2028 | |
| 14 August 2026 | CF | (Kenya) Louis Millard | 30 June 2028 | |
| 1 September 2026 | CAM | (England) Danny Butterworth | 1 February 2027 | |
| 1 September 2026 | CF | (Republic of Ireland) Aaron Drinan | 30 June 2030 | |

== Pre-season and friendlies ==
On 20 May, Swindon announced their first pre-season friendly, against Forest Green Rovers. Six days later, a second fixture was confirmed to be against Chippenham Town. On 28 May, Swindon announced a home friendly against Bristol City. A fourth friendly fixture was confirmed against Leyton Orient. A fifth, against Woking, was next to be confirmed. On 11 June, the club announced a warm-weather training camp in Alicante, Spain between 6–11 July, along with a fixture against Costa City later confirmed. Five days later, an opening fixture against Swindon Supermarine was confirmed. On 29 June, a final friendly against Crystal Palace was added to complete the schedule.

Win Draw Loss Fixtures

| 4 July 2026 Friendly | Swindon Supermarine | 0–4 | Swindon Town | South Marston |
| 12:00 BST | | Report | Drinan 6', 11' (pen.), 18'; Palmer 58' | Stadium: The Imagine Cruising Stadium; Attendance: 2,000 |

| 10 July 2026 Friendly | Costa City | 0–1 | Swindon Town | La Nucia, Spain |
| 18:00 CEST | | Report | Holman 76' (pen.) | Stadium: Estadio Camilo Cano |
Note: Fixture was initially scheduled for a 19:00 kick-off, but was brought forward to allow supporters to watch Spain in the 2026 FIFA World Cup.

| 14 July 2026 Friendly | Chippenham Town | 1–0 | Swindon Town | Chippenham |
| 19:30 BST | Sady 11' | Report | | Stadium: Hardenhuish Park |

| 18 July 2026 Friendly | Crystal Palace | 5–1 | Swindon Town | Beckenham |
| 12:30 BST | Nketiah 9', 21'; França 56', 60' (pen.), 82' | Report | Drinan (penalty missed) 27'; Holman 33' | Stadium: Crystal Palace Training Centre; Attendance: 0 (BCD) |

| 25 July 2026 Friendly | Swindon Town | 1–3 | Bristol City | Swindon |
| 15:00 BST | Drinan 16' | Report | Tolaj 57', 74'; Wallace 78' | Stadium: Nigel Eady County Ground |

| 28 July 2026 Friendly | Swindon Town | 2–1 | Leyton Orient | Swindon |
| 19:00 BST | Millard 7'; Virtue 29'; Sowe (yellow card) 74' | Report | Olowu (yellow card) 66'; Archibald 76' | Stadium: Nigel Eady County Ground |

| 1 August 2026 Friendly | Forest Green Rovers | 1–4 | Swindon Town | Nailsworth |
| 15:00 BST | Rees 76' | Report | Drinan 8'; Glatzel 9', 49'; Middlemas 65' | Stadium: Nailsworth's New Lawn |

== Competitions ==
=== League Two ===
==== League table ====
| Pos | Team | Pld | W | D | L | GF | GA | GD | Pts |
|---|---|---|---|---|---|---|---|---|---|
| 15 | Fleetwood Town | 16 | 5 | 5 | 6 | 20 | 20 | 0 | 20 |
| 16 | Bristol Rovers | 16 | 6 | 1 | 9 | 20 | 25 | −5 | 19 |
| 17 | Swindon Town | 16 | 5 | 4 | 7 | 16 | 23 | −7 | 19 |
| 18 | Northampton Town | 15 | 4 | 6 | 5 | 13 | 13 | 0 | 18 |
| 19 | Port Vale | 14 | 5 | 3 | 6 | 15 | 18 | −3 | 18 |

Updated to match(es) played on 21 November 2026. Source: EFL Official Website
Rules for classification: 1) Points; 2) Goal difference; 3) Number of goals scored; 4) Head-to-head results; 5) Wins; 6) Away goals; 7) Penalty points (sec 9.5); 8) 12-point sending off offences

==== Results summary ====
| Overall | | | | | | | | Home | | | | | | Away | | | | | |
| Pld | W | D | L | GF | GA | GD | Pts | W | D | L | GF | GA | GD | W | D | L | GF | GA | GD |
|---|---|---|---|---|---|---|---|---|---|---|---|---|---|---|---|---|---|---|---|
| 16 | 5 | 4 | 7 | 16 | 23 | −7 | 19 | 4 | 2 | 2 | 13 | 11 | +2 | 1 | 2 | 5 | 3 | 12 | −9 |

Last updated: 14 November 2026.
Source: Soccerway

==== Results by round ====
| Round | 1 | 2 | 3 | 4 | 5 | 6 | 7 | 8 | 9 | 10 | 11 | 12 | 13 | 14 | 15 | 16 | 17 | 18 | 19 | 20 | 21 | 22 | 23 | 24 | 25 | 26 | 27 | 28 |
|---|---|---|---|---|---|---|---|---|---|---|---|---|---|---|---|---|---|---|---|---|---|---|---|---|---|---|---|---|
| Ground | A | H | A | H | H | A | A | H | A | H | H | A | A | H | H | A | H | A | A | H | A | H | H | A | A | H | H | A |
| Result | D | W | L | W | W | L | L | D | L | L | D | W | D | W | L | L | | | | | | | | | | | | |
| Position | 14 | 7 | 14 | 9 | 2 | 9 | 13 | 11 | 13 | 17 | 18 | 16 | 14 | 13 | 16 | 17 | | | | | | | | | | | | |
| Points | 1 | 4 | 4 | 7 | 10 | 10 | 10 | 11 | 11 | 11 | 12 | 15 | 16 | 19 | 19 | 19 | | | | | | | | | | | | |

Source: EFL
A = Away; H = Home; W = Win; D = Draw; L = Loss; P = Postponed

==== Matches ====
On 25 June, the League Two fixtures were revealed.

Win Draw Loss Fixtures

| 15 August 2026 1 | Northampton Town | 0–0 | Swindon Town | Northampton |
| 15:00 BST | | Report | Clark (yellow card) 37'; Nichols (yellow card) 73' | Stadium: Sixfields Stadium; Attendance: 7,120 (1,534 away fans); Referee: Scott Oldham |

| 22 August 2026 2 | Swindon Town | 2–1 | Cheltenham Town | Swindon |
| 15:00 BST | Virtue (yellow card) 4'; Drinan 17'; Clarke 55' | Report | Broom 85'; Bickerstaff (yellow card) 90+2' | Stadium: Nigel Eady County Ground; Attendance: 8,833 (999 away fans); Referee: Craig Hicks |

| 29 August 2026 3 | Oldham Athletic | 3–0 | Swindon Town | Oldham |
| 15:00 BST | Nevitt 41'; Kavanagh 84' (pen.); Fondop 90+5' | Report | Clarke (yellow card) 71'; Majekodunmi (yellow card) 75'; Ripley (yellow card) 83' | Stadium: Boundary Park; Attendance: 7,589 (539 away fans); Referee: Dean Whitestone |

| 1 September 2026 4 | Swindon Town | 3–1 | Port Vale | Swindon |
| 19:45 BST | Drinan 13'; Middlemas 71'; Thomson (yellow card) 87'; Millard 90+4' | Report | Lynch 2'; Humphreys (yellow card) 58' | Stadium: Nigel Eady County Ground; Attendance: 6,609; Referee: Matthew Corlett |

| 5 September 2026 5 | Swindon Town | 3–1 | Colchester United | Swindon |
| 15:00 BST | Drinan (penalty missed) 49' 49', 77', 79'; Butler (yellow card) 54'; Munda (yellow card) 58' | Report | Kouassi 13' | Stadium: Nigel Eady County Ground; Attendance: 8,253; Referee: Sunny Sukhvir Gill |

| 12 September 2026 6 | York City | 4–0 | Swindon Town | York |
| 15:00 BST | Newby 16', 72'; Banks 24'; Kitching (yellow card) 69'; Pearce 82' | Report | Clark (red card) 67' | Stadium: York Community Stadium; Attendance: 8,141 (848 away fans); Referee: Darren Drysdale |

| 19 September 2026 7 | Salford City | 1–0 | Swindon Town | Salford |
| 15:00 BST | Powell 77' | Report | Ball (yellow card) 43'; Clarke (yellow card) 71'; Debayo (yellow card) 87' | Stadium: Moor Lane; Attendance: 3,052 (454 away fans); Referee: Neil Hair |

| 26 September 2026 8 | Swindon Town | 1–1 | Accrington Stanley | Swindon |
| 15:00 BST | Hungbo 31'; Majekodunmi (yellow card) 51' | Report | Woods 1' (yellow card) 66' | Stadium: Nigel Eady County Ground; Attendance: 7,633; Referee: Harrison Blair |

| 3 October 2026 9 | Rochdale | 1–0 | Swindon Town | Rochdale |
| 15:00 BST | Hayes 88' | Report | Majekodunmi (yellow card) 81' (yellow-red card) 85' | Stadium: Spotland Stadium; Attendance: 4,235; Referee: Alan Dale |

| 10 October 2026 10 | Swindon Town | 0–1 | Crewe Alexandra | Swindon |
| 12:30 BST | Clarke (yellow card) 14'; Ripley (yellow card) 90+6' | Report | Gibson 60'; Holíček (yellow card) 64' | Stadium: Nigel Eady County Ground; Attendance: 7,123; Referee: Jamie O'Connor |
Note: Fixture was initially scheduled for a 15:00 kick-off, but was brought forward for live Sky Sports broadcasting.

| 17 October 2026 11 | Swindon Town | 1–1 | Walsall | Swindon |
| 15:00 BST | Drinan 5'; Ball (yellow card) 77' | Report | Sodje 55' | Stadium: Nigel Eady County Ground; Attendance: 7,197; Referee: Alex Chilowicz |

| 20 October 2026 12 | Barnet | 1–3 | Swindon Town | Edgware, London |
| 19:45 BST | Tshimanga 90' | Report | Clark 8'; Drinan 35', 37'; Millard (yellow card) 90+2' | Stadium: The Hive Stadium; Attendance: 2,200; Referee: Ben Atkinson |

| 24 October 2026 13 | Bristol Rovers | 0–0 | Swindon Town | Horfield, Bristol |
| 15:00 BST | Balmer (yellow card) 37' | Report | Majekodunmi (yellow card) 76'; Butler (yellow card) 90+3' | Stadium: Memorial Stadium; Attendance: 9,897; Referee: Seb Stockbridge |

| 31 October 2026 14 | Swindon Town | 2–1 | Rotherham United | Swindon |
| 15:00 GMT | Thomson 45+3'; Hungbo 81' | Report | Buyabu (red card) 4'; Ngwenya (yellow card) 72'; Iorfa (red card) 79'; Hall 87', (yellow card) 90+5' | Stadium: Nigel Eady County Ground; Attendance: 7,515 (406 away); Referee: Isaac Searle |

| 14 November 2026 15 | Swindon Town | 1–4 | Grimsby Town | Swindon |
| 15:00 GMT | Clark (yellow card) 26'; Butler (yellow card) 44' (yellow-red card) 66'; Drinan (penalty missed) 85' 85' | Report | Cook 21'; Morgan 43', 58' (pen.); Andrews 82' | Stadium: Nigel Eady County Ground; Attendance: 7,020 (719 away); Referee: Ruebyn Ricardo |

| 21 November 2026 16 | Newport County | 2–0 | Swindon Town | Newport |
| 12:30 GMT | Lewis 6', 18' (yellow card) 38'; Cameron (yellow card) 41' | Report | Drinan (yellow card) 20'; Snowdon (yellow card) 41'; McGregor (yellow card) 45+3'; Hackford (yellow card) 90+2' | Stadium: Rodney Parade; Attendance: 5,330; Referee: Leigh Doughty |
Note: Fixture was initially scheduled for a 15:00 kick-off, but was brought forward for live Sky Sports broadcasting.

| 28 November 2026 17 | Swindon Town | v | Chesterfield | Swindon |
| 15:00 GMT | | | | Stadium: Nigel Eady County Ground |

| 1 December 2026 18 | Gillingham | v | Swindon Town | Gillingham |
| 19:45 GMT | | | | Stadium: MEMS Priestfield Stadium |

| 12 December 2026 19 | Fleetwood Town | v | Swindon Town | Fleetwood |
| 15:00 GMT | | | | Stadium: Highbury Stadium |

| 19 December 2026 20 | Swindon Town | v | Tranmere Rovers | Swindon |
| 15:00 GMT | | | | Stadium: Nigel Eady County Ground |

| 26 December 2026 21 | Shrewsbury Town | v | Swindon Town | Shrewsbury |
| 15:00 GMT | | | | Stadium: Croud Meadow |

| 29 December 2026 22 | Swindon Town | v | Exeter City | Swindon |
| 19:45 GMT | | | | Stadium: Nigel Eady County Ground |

| 1 January 2027 23 | Swindon Town | v | Crawley Town | Swindon |
| 15:00 GMT | | | | Stadium: Nigel Eady County Ground |

| 9 January 2027 24 | Tranmere Rovers | v | Swindon Town | Birkenhead |
| 15:00 GMT | | | | Stadium: Prenton Park |

| 16 January 2027 25 | Walsall | v | Swindon Town | Bescot |
| 15:00 GMT | | | | Stadium: Bescot Stadium |

| 19 January 2027 26 | Swindon Town | v | Barnet | Swindon |
| 19:45 GMT | | | | Stadium: Nigel Eady County Ground |

| 23 January 2027 27 | Swindon Town | v | Bristol Rovers | Swindon |
| 15:00 GMT | | | | Stadium: Nigel Eady County Ground |

| 30 January 2027 28 | Rotherham United | v | Swindon Town | Rotherham |
| 12:30 GMT | | | | Stadium: AESSEAL New York Stadium |
Note: Fixture was initially scheduled for a 15:00 kick-off, but was brought forward for live Sky Sports broadcasting.

=== FA Cup ===
The draw for the first round proper took place on 19 October 2026, with the club being drawn at away to Milton Keynes Dons of EFL League One.

Win Draw Loss Fixtures

| 7 November 2026 First round | Milton Keynes Dons | 2–1 | Swindon Town | Milton Keynes |
| 15:00 GMT | Ekpiteta 6'; Collins 13'; Sanders (yellow card) 83'; Gilbey (yellow card) 90+1' | Report | Drinan 45+1'; Munda (yellow card) 57'; Nichols (yellow card) 81' | Stadium: Stadium MK; Attendance: 3,601 (901 away); Referee: Aaron Jackson |

=== EFL Cup ===
Swindon were drawn away to Cardiff City in the first round for the second successive season.

Win Draw Loss Fixtures

| 8 August 2026 First round | Cardiff City | 3–2 | Swindon Town | Leckwith, Cardiff |
| 15:00 BST | Salech 29' (pen.), 43'; Moylan 77'; Colwill (yellow card) 82' | Report | Osho 9' (o.g.); Glatzel 62'; Debayo (yellow card) 84' (yellow-red card) 90' | Stadium: Cardiff City Stadium; Attendance: Grant Ward; Referee: 6,168 |

=== EFL Trophy ===
==== Group stage ====
Swindon were drawn against Plymouth Argyle, Newport County and Crystal Palace U21 into Southern Group E.

| Pos | Div | Team | Pld | W | PW | PL | L | GF | GA | GD | Pts | Qualification |
|---|---|---|---|---|---|---|---|---|---|---|---|---|
| 1 | L1 | Plymouth Argyle | 3 | 2 | 1 | 0 | 0 | 9 | 4 | +5 | 8 | Advance to Round 2 |
| 2 | ACA | Crystal Palace U21 | 3 | 2 | 0 | 0 | 1 | 5 | 7 | −2 | 6 | Advance to Round 2 |
| 3 | L2 | Newport County | 3 | 1 | 0 | 1 | 1 | 5 | 4 | +1 | 4 | |
| 4 | L2 | Swindon Town | 3 | 0 | 0 | 0 | 3 | 2 | 6 | −4 | 0 | |

Source: EFL

Win Draw Loss Fixtures

| 15 September 2026 Group stage | Swindon Town | 1–2 | Crystal Palace U21 | Swindon |
| 19:00 BST | Inwood (yellow card) 9'; Hackford 23' | | Kporha 45+1'; Williams 55'; Benamar (yellow card) 61' | Stadium: The Nigel Eady County Ground; Attendance: Aaron Farmer; Referee: 1,433 |

| 22 September 2026 Group stage | Swindon Town | 0–2 | Newport County | Swindon |
| 19:00 BST | Butler (yellow card) 63'; Debayo (yellow card) 73' | Report | Garner 4' (penalty missed) 17'; Nyakuhwa 80' | Stadium: The Nigel Eady County Ground; Attendance: 1,368; Referee: Declan Borne |

| 10 November 2026 Group stage | Plymouth Argyle | 2–1 | Swindon Town | Plymouth |
| 19:00 GMT | Curtis 27' (pen.); Ibrahim (yellow card) 42'; MacKenzie (yellow card) 61'; Campbell 90+9' | Report | McGregor (yellow card) 29'; Hackford 35' | Stadium: Home Park; Attendance: 2,508; Referee: Lewis Sandoe |

== Statistics ==
=== Appearances and goals ===
As of match played 21 November 2026

Players with no appearances are not included on the list; italics indicate loaned in player

| No. | Pos | Nat | Player | Total | | League Two | | FA Cup | | EFL Cup | | EFL Trophy | |
| No. | Pos | Nat | Player | Apps | Goals | Apps | Goals | Apps | Goals | Apps | Goals | Apps | Goals |
|---|---|---|---|---|---|---|---|---|---|---|---|---|---|
| 1 | GK | (England) ENG | Connor Ripley | 18 | 0 | 16+0 | 0 | 1+0 | 0 | 1+0 | 0 | 0+0 | 0 |
| 2 | DF | (England) ENG | Mitch Clark | 16 | 1 | 12+0 | 1 | 1+0 | 0 | 1+0 | 0 | 2+0 | 0 |
| 5 | DF | (Moldova) MDA | Stephan Negru | 17 | 0 | 14+0 | 0 | 1+0 | 0 | 1+0 | 0 | 0+1 | 0 |
| 6 | DF | (England) ENG | James Ball | 15 | 0 | 8+3 | 0 | 1+0 | 0 | 0+0 | 0 | 2+1 | 0 |
| 7 | FW | (England) ENG | Tom Nichols | 16 | 0 | 7+4 | 0 | 0+1 | 0 | 1+0 | 0 | 3+0 | 0 |
| 8 | MF | (England) ENG | Ollie Clarke | 10 | 1 | 8+1 | 1 | 0+0 | 0 | 0+0 | 0 | 0+1 | 0 |
| 9 | MF | (Germany) GER | Paul Glatzel | 6 | 1 | 2+2 | 0 | 0+0 | 0 | 1+0 | 1 | 0+1 | 0 |
| 12 | GK | (England) ENG | Lewis Ward | 3 | 0 | 0+0 | 0 | 0+0 | 0 | 0+0 | 0 | 3+0 | 0 |
| 14 | MF | (England) ENG | Danny Butterworth | 7 | 0 | 0+5 | 0 | 0+0 | 0 | 0+0 | 0 | 2+0 | 0 |
| 15 | MF | (England) ENG | Joseph Hungbo | 12 | 2 | 3+6 | 2 | 0+0 | 0 | 0+1 | 0 | 1+1 | 0 |
| 16 | DF | (Northern Ireland) NIR | Sam Inwood | 5 | 0 | 3+0 | 0 | 0+0 | 0 | 1+0 | 0 | 1+0 | 0 |
| 17 | DF | (England) ENG | Ryan Tafazolli | 5 | 0 | 3+1 | 0 | 0+0 | 0 | 0+1 | 0 | 0+0 | 0 |
| 18 | DF | (England) ENG | James Debayo | 13 | 0 | 0+9 | 0 | 0+0 | 0 | 0+1 | 0 | 3+0 | 0 |
| 19 | MF | (England) ENG | Joe Snowdon | 13 | 0 | 8+3 | 0 | 1+0 | 0 | 0+0 | 0 | 0+1 | 0 |
| 20 | MF | (England) ENG | Ben Middlemas | 8 | 1 | 4+2 | 1 | 0+0 | 0 | 1+0 | 0 | 1+0 | 0 |
| 21 | DF | (Australia) AUS | Kaelan Majekodunmi | 16 | 0 | 10+4 | 0 | 0+1 | 0 | 0+0 | 0 | 1+0 | 0 |
| 22 | MF | (Australia) AUS | Jaylan Pearman | 8 | 0 | 1+3 | 0 | 0+1 | 0 | 0+0 | 0 | 2+1 | 0 |
| 23 | FW | (Republic of Ireland) IRL | Aaron Drinan | 18 | 10 | 16+0 | 9 | 1+0 | 1 | 1+0 | 0 | 0+0 | 0 |
| 24 | MF | (England) ENG | Matty Virtue | 14 | 0 | 7+3 | 0 | 1+0 | 0 | 1+0 | 0 | 1+1 | 0 |
| 25 | MF | (Scotland) SCO | Jack Thomson | 15 | 1 | 13+1 | 1 | 1+0 | 0 | 0+0 | 0 | 0+0 | 0 |
| 26 | MF | (England) ENG | Dan Butler | 12 | 0 | 9+0 | 0 | 1+0 | 0 | 0+0 | 0 | 0+2 | 0 |
| 27 | MF | (England) ENG | Anthony Munda | 14 | 0 | 12+0 | 0 | 1+0 | 0 | 0+0 | 0 | 0+1 | 0 |
| 28 | FW | (England) ENG | Ollie Palmer | 9 | 0 | 1+6 | 0 | 0+1 | 0 | 0+1 | 0 | 0+0 | 0 |
| 29 | FW | (England) ENG | Antwoine Hackford | 13 | 2 | 5+5 | 0 | 0+0 | 0 | 0+0 | 0 | 3+0 | 2 |
| 33 | MF | (England) ENG | Joel McGregor | 6 | 0 | 2+2 | 0 | 1+0 | 0 | 0+0 | 0 | 1+0 | 0 |
| 34 | DF | (England) ENG | Billy Kirkman | 16 | 0 | 9+4 | 0 | 0+0 | 0 | 1+0 | 0 | 2+0 | 0 |
| 38 | DF | (England) ENG | Lucas Griffiths-Brown | 5 | 0 | 0+1 | 0 | 0+0 | 0 | 0+1 | 0 | 3+0 | 0 |
| 39 | FW | (Kenya) KEN | Louis Millard | 13 | 1 | 2+8 | 1 | 0+1 | 0 | 1+0 | 0 | 1+0 | 0 |
| 43 | MF | (England) ENG | Freddie Hoare | 4 | 0 | 0+1 | 0 | 0+0 | 0 | 0+0 | 0 | 1+2 | 0 |
| 44 | MF | (England) ENG | Rory Da Costa | 3 | 0 | 0+1 | 0 | 0+0 | 0 | 0+0 | 0 | 0+2 | 0 |
| 45 | MF | (England) ENG | Jacob Hagan | 1 | 0 | 0+0 | 0 | 0+0 | 0 | 0+0 | 0 | 0+1 | 0 |

=== Assists record ===
As of match played 21 November 2026

| Rank | No. | Nat. | Pos. | Name | League Two | FA Cup | EFL Cup | EFL Trophy | Total |
|---|---|---|---|---|---|---|---|---|---|
| 1 | 2 | (England) | DF | Dan Butler | 2 | 0 | 0 | 0 | 2 |
| 1 | 5 | (Moldova) | MF | Stephan Negru | 2 | 0 | 0 | 0 | 2 |
| 1 | 25 | (Scotland) | MF | Jack Thomson | 2 | 0 | 0 | 0 | 2 |
| 4 | 6 | (England) | MF | James Ball | 0 | 1 | 0 | 0 | 1 |
| 4 | 7 | (England) | MF | Tom Nichols | 0 | 0 | 0 | 1 | 1 |
| 4 | 15 | (England) | MF | Joseph Hungbo | 0 | 0 | 1 | 0 | 1 |
| 4 | 23 | (Republic of Ireland) | FW | Aaron Drinan | 1 | 0 | 0 | 0 | 1 |
| 4 | 24 | (Scotland) | MF | Matty Virtue | 1 | 0 | 0 | 0 | 1 |
| 4 | 27 | (England) | MF | Anthony Munda | 1 | 0 | 0 | 0 | 1 |
| Total | | | | | 9 | 1 | 1 | 1 | 12 |

=== Disciplinary record ===
As of match played 21 November 2026

| Rank | No. | Nat. | Pos. | Name | League Two | | | FA Cup | | | EFL Cup | | | EFL Trophy | | | Total | | |
| Rank | No. | Nat. | Pos. | Name | Yellow card | (yellow card) (yellow-red card) | Red card | Yellow card | (yellow card) (yellow-red card) | Red card | Yellow card | (yellow card) (yellow-red card) | Red card | Yellow card | (yellow card) (yellow-red card) | Red card | Yellow card | (yellow card) (yellow-red card) | Red card |
|---|---|---|---|---|---|---|---|---|---|---|---|---|---|---|---|---|---|---|---|
| 1 | 21 | (Australia) | CB | Kaelan Majekodunmi | 3 | 1 | 0 | 0 | 0 | 0 | 0 | 0 | 0 | 0 | 0 | 0 | 3 | 1 | 0 |
| 1 | 26 | (England) | LB | Dan Butler | 2 | 1 | 0 | 0 | 0 | 0 | 0 | 0 | 0 | 1 | 0 | 0 | 3 | 1 | 0 |
| 3 | 2 | (Wales) | RB | Mitch Clark | 2 | 0 | 1 | 0 | 0 | 0 | 0 | 0 | 0 | 0 | 0 | 0 | 2 | 0 | 1 |
| 3 | 18 | (England) | CB | James Debayo | 1 | 0 | 0 | 0 | 0 | 0 | 0 | 1 | 0 | 1 | 0 | 0 | 2 | 1 | 0 |
| 5 | 8 | (England) | CM | Ollie Clarke | 3 | 0 | 0 | 0 | 0 | 0 | 0 | 0 | 0 | 0 | 0 | 0 | 3 | 0 | 0 |
| 6 | 1 | (England) | GK | Connor Ripley | 2 | 0 | 0 | 0 | 0 | 0 | 0 | 0 | 0 | 0 | 0 | 0 | 2 | 0 | 0 |
| 6 | 6 | (England) | CM | James Ball | 2 | 0 | 0 | 0 | 0 | 0 | 0 | 0 | 0 | 0 | 0 | 0 | 2 | 0 | 0 |
| 6 | 7 | (England) | CAM | Tom Nichols | 1 | 0 | 0 | 1 | 0 | 0 | 0 | 0 | 0 | 0 | 0 | 0 | 2 | 0 | 0 |
| 6 | 27 | (England) | CM | Anthony Munda | 1 | 0 | 0 | 1 | 0 | 0 | 0 | 0 | 0 | 0 | 0 | 0 | 2 | 0 | 0 |
| 6 | 33 | (England) | RB | Joel McGregor | 1 | 0 | 0 | 0 | 0 | 0 | 0 | 0 | 0 | 1 | 0 | 0 | 2 | 0 | 0 |
| 11 | 14 | (England) | CAM | Daniel Butterworth | 1 | 0 | 0 | 0 | 0 | 0 | 0 | 0 | 0 | 0 | 0 | 0 | 1 | 0 | 0 |
| 11 | 16 | (Northern Ireland) | CB | Sam Inwood | 0 | 0 | 0 | 0 | 0 | 0 | 0 | 0 | 0 | 1 | 0 | 0 | 1 | 0 | 0 |
| 11 | 19 | (England) | RWB | Joe Snowdon | 1 | 0 | 0 | 0 | 0 | 0 | 0 | 0 | 0 | 0 | 0 | 0 | 1 | 0 | 0 |
| 11 | 23 | (Republic of Ireland) | ST | Aaron Drinan | 1 | 0 | 0 | 0 | 0 | 0 | 0 | 0 | 0 | 0 | 0 | 0 | 1 | 0 | 0 |
| 11 | 24 | (England) | CM | Matty Virtue | 1 | 0 | 0 | 0 | 0 | 0 | 0 | 0 | 0 | 0 | 0 | 0 | 1 | 0 | 0 |
| 11 | 25 | (Scotland) | CM | Jack Thomson | 1 | 0 | 0 | 0 | 0 | 0 | 0 | 0 | 0 | 0 | 0 | 0 | 1 | 0 | 0 |
| 11 | 29 | (England) | ST | Antwoine Hackford | 1 | 0 | 0 | 0 | 0 | 0 | 0 | 0 | 0 | 0 | 0 | 0 | 1 | 0 | 0 |
| 11 | 39 | (Kenya) | MF | Louis Millard | 1 | 0 | 0 | 0 | 0 | 0 | 0 | 0 | 0 | 0 | 0 | 0 | 1 | 0 | 0 |
| Total | | | | | 25 | 2 | 1 | 2 | 0 | 0 | 0 | 1 | 0 | 5 | 0 | 0 | 33 | 2 | 1 |

=== Clean sheets ===
As of match played 21 November 2026

| Rank | No. | Nat. | Name | League Two | FA Cup | EFL Cup | EFL Trophy | Total |
|---|---|---|---|---|---|---|---|---|
| 1 | 1 | (England) | Connor Ripley | 2 | 0 | 0 | 0 | 2 |
| Total | | | | 2 | 0 | 0 | 0 | 2 |

== Awards ==
=== Player Awards ===
==== EFL League Two Goal of the Month ====
| Month | Player | Opposition | Result | Ref. |
|---|---|---|---|---|
| August | (Republic of Ireland) Aaron Drinan | v. Cheltenham Town | Nominated | |
