= 2025–26 Swindon Town F.C. season =

147th season in existence of Swindon Town FC

Swindon Town
2025–26 season
- Owner: Clem Morfuni & Hollie Kiely
- Chairman: Clem Morfuni
- Manager: Ian Holloway
- Stadium: County Ground
- League Two: 9th
- FA Cup: Third round
- EFL Cup: First round (eliminated by Cardiff City)
- EFL Trophy: Expelled
- Top goalscorer: League: Aaron Drinan (22); All: Aaron Drinan (28)
- Highest home attendance: 12,989 vs. Chesterfield
- Lowest home attendance: 2,096 vs. West Ham United U21
- Biggest win: 4–0 vs. MK Dons (A); 4–0 vs. Bolton Wanderers (H)
- Biggest defeat: 0–4 vs. Accrington Stanley (A); 0–4 vs. Grimsby Town (A)
Home colours	Away colours	Third colours

The 2025–26 season is the 147th season in the history of Swindon Town Football Club and their fifth consecutive season in League Two. In addition to the domestic league, the club would also participate in the FA Cup, the EFL Cup, and the EFL Trophy.

== Transfers and contracts ==
=== In ===
Date	Pos.	Player	From	Fee	Ref.
28 June 2025	CF	(England) Jake Tabor	(England) Amersham Town	Undisclosed	
1 July 2025 (Note: The transfer was announced on 4 June, and would become official on July 1 once his contract at AFC Wimbledon had ended)	CM	(England) James Ball	(England) AFC Wimbledon	Free	
1 July 2025 (Note: The transfer was announced on 10 June, and would become official on July 1 once his contract at Wolverhampton had ended)	CB	(Democratic Republic of the Congo) Filozofe Mabete	(England) Wolverhampton Wanderers	Free	
1 July 2025 (Note: The transfer was announced on 21 May, and would become official on July 1 once his contract at Mansfield had ended)	CF	(England) Tom Nichols	(England) Mansfield Town	Free	
1 July 2025 (Note: The transfer was announced on 23 May, and would become official on July 1 once his contract at Chesterfield had ended)	CM	(England) Darren Oldaker	(England) Chesterfield	Free	
1 July 2025 (Note: The transfer was announced on 10 June, and would become official on July 1 once his contract at Leeds had ended)	CM	(England) Joe Snowdon	(England) Leeds United	Free	
2 July 2025	GK	(England) Lewis Ward	(England) AFC Wimbledon	Free	
21 July 2025	RW	(Wales) Billy Bodin	(England) Burton Albion	Free	
28 August 2025	CB	(England) Ryan Tafazolli	(England) Wycombe Wanderers	Free	
29 August 2025	CF	(England) Ollie Palmer	(Wales) Wrexham	Free	
13 January 2026	CM	(England) Ben Middlemas	(England) Sunderland	Undisclosed	
14 January 2026	CF	(England) Fletcher Holman	(England) Wolverhampton Wanderers	Undisclosed	
2 February 2026	LB	(England) Jake Batty	(England) Blackburn Rovers	Undisclosed	
2 February 2026	LW	(Canada) Junior Hoilett	(Scotland) Hibernian	Free Transfer	

=== Out ===
Date	Pos.	Player	To	Fee	Ref.
19 July 2025	CB	(Republic of Ireland) Tunmise Sobowale	(Scotland) St Mirren	Free transfer	
28 August 2025	CF	(Iraq) Botan Ameen	(England) Norwich City	£250,000	

Income: ▲ ~ £250,000

=== Loaned in ===
Date	Pos.	Player	From	Date until	Ref.
15 July 2025	CB	(England) Finley Munroe	(England) Aston Villa	12 January 2026 (Note: On 12 January, Munroe was recalled to his parent club Aston Villa from his initial season-long loan)	
26 July 2025	CB	(England) Tom Wilson-Brown	(England) Leicester City	31 May 2026	
11 August 2025	CF	(England) Princewill Ehibhatiomhan	(England) Southampton	5 January 2026 (Note: On 5 January, Ehibhatiomhan's season-long loan from Southampton was terminated)	
1 September 2025	CB	(Canada) Jamie Knight-Lebel	(England) Bristol City	31 May 2026	
1 September 2025	CM	(Republic of Ireland) Adam Murphy	(England) Bristol City	9 January 2026 (Note: On 9 January, Murphy's season-long loan from Bristol City was terminated due to injury)	
2 January 2026	RW	(England) Michael Olakigbe	(England) Brentford	31 May 2026	
3 January 2026	CM	(Scotland) Aidan Borland	(England) Aston Villa	31 May 2026	
2 February 2026	LW	(Gibraltar) James Scanlon	(England) Manchester United	31 May 2026	

=== Loaned out ===
Date	Pos.	Player	To	Date until	Ref.
2 July 2025	GK	(England) Redman Evans	(England) Alvechurch	31 May 2026 (Note: On 28 October, Evans' loan at Alvechurch was extended until the end of the season)	
7 July 2025	CB	(England) Sonny Hart	(Scotland) Greenock Morton	5 January 2026 (Note: On 5 January, Hart was recalled from his loan at Morton)	
9 July 2025	GK	(England) Lucas Myers	(England) Melksham Town	Work experience	
31 July 2025	CM	(England) Dylan Mitchell	(England) Weston-super-Mare	28 August 2025	
8 August 2025	CF	(England) George Alston	(England) Swindon Supermarine	Work experience	
8 August 2025	CM	(Spain) Dani González	(England) Swindon Supermarine	Work experience	
8 August 2025	GK	(England) Lucas Myers	(England) Swindon Supermarine	Work experience	
15 August 2025	CB	(England) Harrison Minturn	(England) Chippenham Town	13 September 2025	
29 August 2025	CM	(England) Jaxon Brown	(England) Hashtag United	31 May 2026	
1 September 2025	CM	(England) Owen Foye	(England) Swindon Supermarine	Work Experience	
4 September 2025	CB	(England) Finlay Tombs	(England) Royal Wootton Bassett Town	Work Experience	
9 September 2025	CAM	(England) Harrison Gray	(England) Melksham Town	Work Experience	
12 September 2025	CB	(England) Charlie Betts	(England) Swindon Supermarine	Work Experience	
13 September 2025	CF	(England) Jake Tabor	(England) Bath City	11 November 2025 (Note: On 14 October, Tabor's loan at Bath was extended by a further month)	
26 September 2025	GK	(England) Lucas Myers	(England) Brislington	3 January 2026 (Note: On 31 October, Myers' loan at Brislington was extended until January)	
17 October 2025	CM	(England) Dylan Mitchell	(England) Leamington	10 January 2026	
30 October 2025	GK	(England) Anton Robinson	(England) Swindon Supermarine	Work experience	
14 November 2025	CM	(England) Kian Larkins	(England) Didcot Town	Work experience	
18 November 2025	CM	(England) Owen Foye	(England) Evesham United	Work experience	
21 November 2025	GK	(England) Anton Robinson	(England) Reading City	Work experience	
16 December 2025	CAM	(England) Harrison Gray	(England) Weymouth	13 January 2026	
16 December 2025	GK	(England) Lucas Myers	(England) Swindon Supermarine	13 January 2026	
9 January 2026	GK	(England) Anton Robinson	(England) Roman Glass St George	Work Experience	
10 January 2026	CB	(England) Sonny Hart	(England) Farnborough	13 February 2026 (Note: On 13 February, Hart was recalled from his initial half-season loan at Farnborough and subsequently joined St Albans City on loan)	
15 January 2026	CB	(Republic of Ireland) Ryan Delaney	(Wales) Newport County	31 May 2026	
6 February 2026	CF	(England) Jake Tabor	(England) Eastleigh	31 May 2026	
13 February 2026	CB	(England) Sonny Hart	(England) St Albans City	31 May 2026	
13 March 2026	CAM	(England) Harrison Gray	(England) Bedford	31 May 2026	

=== Released / Out of Contract ===
Date	Pos.	Player	Subsequent club	Join date	Ref.
30 June 2025	LW	(England) Sean McGurk	(England) South Shields	8 July 2025	
30 June 2025	CM	(Nigeria) Nnamdi Ofoborh	(England) Barnet	28 July 2025	
30 June 2025	GK	(England) Jack Bycroft	(England) Exeter City	31 July 2025	
30 June 2025	CM	(The Gambia) Saidou Khan	(Tunisia) Club Africain	13 August 2025	
30 June 2025	CM	(England) Jake Cain	(England) Morecambe	21 August 2025	
30 June 2025	CB	(England) Grant Hall	(England) Whitehawk	1 October 2025	
30 June 2025	LB	(England) George Cox	(England) Worthing	24 October 2025	
30 June 2025	RM	(England) Anton Dworzak	(England) Melksham Town	24 November 2025	
30 June 2025	CB	(England) Pharrell Johnson			
30 June 2025	LM	(England) Tariq Uwakwe			
20 February 2026	CM	(England) Dylan Mitchell			

=== New Contract ===
Date	Pos.	Player	Contracted until	Ref.
2 June 2025	AM	(Germany) Paul Glatzel	30 June 2027	
2 June 2025	RB	(England) Joel McGregor	30 June 2027	
7 June 2025	GK	(England) Connor Ripley	30 June 2027	
20 June 2025	CF	(Republic of Ireland) Aaron Drinan	30 June 2027	
17 October 2025	RWB	(England) Joe Snowdon	30 June 2027	
3 January 2026	CM	(Republic of Ireland) Gavin Kilkenny	30 June 2028	
12 February 2026	CF	(Republic of Ireland) Aaron Drinan	30 June 2028	

== Pre-season and friendlies ==
During pre-season, Swindon Town announced their initial schedule, with matches against Swindon Supermarine, Melksham Town, Reading, Chippenham Town and Eastleigh.

Win Draw Loss Fixtures

5 July 2025 Friendly	Swindon Supermarine	0–4	Swindon Town	South Marston
15:00 BST		Report	Ameen 16', 31'; Smith 65'; Tabor 74'	Stadium: Webbswood Stadium

12 July 2025 Friendly	Melksham Town	0–4	Swindon Town	Melksham
15:00 BST		Report	Nichols 28'; Tabor 73', 77'; Wright 90+1'	Stadium: Oakfield Stadium

15 July 2025 Friendly	Reading	2–1	Swindon Town	Sindlesham
12:00 BST	Trialist; Ehibhatiomhan (pen.)	Report		Stadium: Bearwood Park Training Ground; Attendance: 0 (Behind-closed-doors)

19 July 2025 Friendly	Chippenham Town	1–5	Swindon Town	Chippenham
15:00 BST	Haines (yellow card) 45'; Owen-Evans 90'	Report	Glatzel 4'; Ameen 18'; Clarke 25'; Ball 45'; Smith (yellow card) 45'; Brown 90'	Stadium: Hardenhuish Park; Attendance: 1,729

26 July 2025 Friendly	Eastleigh	2–3	Swindon Town	Eastleigh
15:00 BST	Shade 25'; McCallum 30' (pen.)	Report	Oldaker 45'; Smith 55'; Snowdon 66'; Mabete (red card) 82'	Stadium: Silverlake Stadium

== Competitions ==
=== League Two ===
==== League table ====
Pos	Team	Pld	W	D	L	GF	GA	GD	Pts	Promotion, qualification or relegation
7	Grimsby Town	46	22	12	12	74	50	+24	78	Qualification for League Two play-offs
8	Barnet	46	21	13	12	70	53	+17	76	
9	Swindon Town	46	22	9	15	70	59	+11	75	
10	Oldham Athletic	46	18	14	14	60	44	+16	68	
11	Crewe Alexandra	46	19	10	17	64	58	+6	67	

Source: EFL Official Website
Rules for classification: 1) Points; 2) Goal difference; 3) Number of goals scored; 4) Head-to-head results; 5) Wins; 6) Away goals; 7) Penalty points (sec 9.5); 8) 12-point sending off offences

==== Results summary ====
Overall								Home						Away					
Pld	W	D	L	GF	GA	GD	Pts	W	D	L	GF	GA	GD	W	D	L	GF	GA	GD
46	22	9	15	70	59	+11	75	11	6	6	38	27	+11	11	3	9	32	32	0

Last updated: 2 May 2026.
Source: Soccerway

==== Results by round ====
Round	1	2	3	4	5	6	7	8	9	10	11	13	12^{1}	14	15	16	17	18	19	20	21	22	23	24	27	28	29	30	25^{2}	31	26^{3}	32	33	34	35	36	37	38	39	40	41	42	43	44	45	46
Ground	A	H	A	H	H	A	A	H	A	H	A	A	H	H	H	A	H	A	H	A	H	A	A	H	H	A	A	H	A	H	H	A	A	H	H	A	H	A	A	H	A	H	A	H	A	H
Result	L	W	W	L	W	W	W	W	L	W	W	L	D	D	W	D	D	W	L	W	W	L	W	W	L	L	L	W	W	W	W	L	W	L	D	D	L	W	W	D	D	W	L	D	L	L
Position	18	11	6	12	8	5	2	1	4	2	2	4	2	2	2	1	2	2	3	3	2	3	2	2	2	6	7	4	4	2	2	3	2	5	4	5	6	6	5	5	5	5	5	6	8	9
Points	0	3	6	6	9	12	15	18	18	21	24	24	25	26	29	30	31	34	34	37	40	40	43	46	46	46	46	49	52	55	58	58	61	61	62	63	63	66	69	70	71	74	74	75	75	75

Source: EFL
A = Away; H = Home; W = Win; D = Draw; L = Loss; P = Postponed
Notes:
- ^{1} Matchday 12 (vs Notts County) was postponed due to the international call-ups.
- ^{2} Matchday 25 (vs Harrogate Town) was postponed due to a frozen pitch.
- ^{3} Matchday 26 (vs Newport County) was postponed due to FA Cup progression.

==== Matches ====
On 26 June, the League Two fixtures were released, with Swindon visiting Walsall on the opening day.

Win Draw Loss Fixtures

2 August 2025 1	Walsall	2–1	Swindon Town	Bescot
15:00 BST	Weir 8'; Comley (red card) 21'; Warrington (yellow card) 46'; Pressley (yellow card) 66'; Barrett 90+1'	Report	Smith (yellow card) 52'; Wright 79' (pen.)	Stadium: Bescot Stadium; Attendance: 8,040 (2,169 away); Referee: Oliver Mackey

9 August 2025 2	Swindon Town	3–2	Cambridge United	Swindon
15:00 BST	Drinan 32'; Smith 34'; Oldaker 53'; Munroe (yellow card) 82'; Butterworth (yellow card) 90+5'	Report	Brophy 4' (yellow card) 90+5'; Kaikai 64'	Stadium: County Ground; Attendance: 8,862 (628 away); Referee: Edward Duckworth

16 August 2025 3	Oldham Athletic	1–2	Swindon Town	Oldham
12:30 BST	Quigley 34'	Report	Snowdon 4'; Nichols 19' (yellow card) 33'; McGregor (yellow card) 50'; Wright (yellow card) 90+2'	Stadium: Boundary Park; Attendance: 6,955 (507 away); Referee: Greg Rollason
Note: Fixture was originally scheduled for a 15:00 kick-off, but was moved live Sky Sports broadcasting.

19 August 2025 4	Swindon Town	0–2	Barnet	Swindon
19:45 BST	Smith (yellow card) 38'; Wright (yellow card) 43'	Report	Osadebe 85'; Shelton (yellow card) 90+1'; Kensdale (yellow card) 90+7'; Adeniran 90+10' (yellow card) 90+11'	Stadium: County Ground; Attendance: 7,485 (216 away); Referee: Andrew Humphries

23 August 2025 5	Swindon Town	2–1	Shrewsbury Town	Swindon
15:00 BST	Drinan 7'; Bodin 90+3'; Ripley (yellow card) 90+5'	Report	Benning (yellow card) 35'; Sang (yellow card) 45+3'; Stewart 90'	Stadium: County Ground; Attendance: 7,498 (370 away); Referee: Lee Swabey

30 August 2025 6	Crewe Alexandra	0–3	Swindon Town	Crewe
12:30 BST	Hutchinson (yellow card) 82'	Report	Kilkenny 8'; Glatzel 35'; Drinan 41'; Nichols (yellow card) 56'	Stadium: Gresty Road; Attendance: 5,431; Referee: Matthew Russell
Note: Fixture was originally scheduled for a 15:00 kick-off, but was moved live Sky Sports broadcasting.

6 September 2025 7	Barrow	1–3	Swindon Town	Barrow-in-Furness
15:00 BST	Smith (yellow card) 49'; Shipley 80'	Report	Drinan 2'; Nichols (yellow card) 16'; Oldaker (yellow card) 26'; Glatzel 36'; Ehibhatiomhan 77'; Kilkenny (yellow card) 85'	Stadium: Holker Street; Attendance: 3,077; Referee: Seb Stockbridge

13 September 2025 8	Swindon Town	3–1	Harrogate Town	Swindon
15:00 BST	Snowdon (yellow card) 28'; Clarke 44'; Munroe (yellow card) 48'; Drinan 71', 90'	Report	Asare (yellow card) 17'; Muldoon 30'; Morris (yellow card) 53'	Stadium: County Ground; Attendance: 7,955 (100 away)

20 September 2025 9	Salford City	3–2	Swindon Town	Kersal
15:00 BST	Grant 4'; Harris 15'; Mnoga (yellow card) 78'; Cesay 90+1'	Report	Munroe (yellow card) 32'; Drinan 54'; Snowdon (yellow card) 61'; Knight-Lebel 83'	Stadium: Moor Lane; Attendance: 3,095 (722 away); Referee: Ross Martin

27 September 2025 10	Swindon Town	2–0	Bromley	Swindon
15:00 BST	Palmer 7'; Drinan 31', (yellow card) 83'; Knight-Lebel (yellow card) 64'	Report	Charles (yellow card) 88'	Stadium: County Ground; Attendance: 7,879 (241 away); Referee: Abigail Byrne

4 October 2025 11	Newport County	0–1	Swindon Town	Newport
12:30 BST	Jenkins (yellow card) 9'; Whitmore (yellow card) 17'; Evans (yellow card) 32'; Spellman (yellow card) 90+6'	Report	Palmer 10'; Nichols (yellow card) 53'; Munroe (yellow card) 59'; Glatzel (yellow card) 73'; Murphy (yellow card) 90+2'; Butterworth (yellow card) 90+7'	Stadium: Rodney Parade; Attendance: 4,565 (1,062 away)
Note: Fixture was originally scheduled for a 15:00 kick-off, but was moved to an earlier kick-off.

18 October 2025 13	Accrington Stanley	4–0	Swindon Town	Accrington
15:00 BST	Madden 8', 72', 90+2'; Heath 79'	Report	Knight-Lebel (yellow card) 6'; Clarke (red card) 37'; Ripley (yellow card) 38'; Kilkenny (yellow card) 45+1'	Stadium: Crown Ground; Referee: Alan Young

21 October 2025 12	Swindon Town	2–2	Notts County	Swindon
19:45 BST	Drinan 19', 78'; Bodin (yellow card) 90+3'; Mabete (yellow card) 90+8'	Report	Grant 3'; McDonald (yellow card) 21'; Robertson (yellow card) 52'; Jatta 62', (yellow card) 63'; Norburn (yellow card) 76'	Stadium: County Ground; Attendance: 7,249; Referee: David Rock
Note: Fixture was originally scheduled for 11 October, but was postponed due to international call-ups in the Notts County squad.

25 October 2025 14	Swindon Town	0–0	Colchester United	Swindon
15:00 BST	Wilson-Brown (yellow card) 62'	Report		Stadium: County Ground; Attendance: 8,542; Referee: Leigh Doughty

8 November 2025 15	Swindon Town	2–1	Tranmere Rovers	Swindon
15:00 GMT	Mabete (yellow card) 45'; Palmer (yellow card) 45+4', (goal) 74'; Munroe (yellow card) 89', (goal) 90+3'	Report	Norman (yellow card) 56'; Jennings (yellow card) 57'; Finley (yellow card) 66'; Dennis 88'	Stadium: County Ground; Attendance: 8,149; Referee: Gavin Ward

15 November 2025 16	Fleetwood Town	1–1	Swindon Town	Fleetwood
15:00 GMT	Graydon 45+2'	Report	Kilkenny (yellow card) 28'; Tafazolli 31', (yellow card) 48'; Nichols (yellow card) 83'	Stadium: Highbury Stadium; Attendance: 3,041; Referee: Richard Eley

23 November 2025 17	Swindon Town	2–2	Grimsby Town	Swindon
15:00 GMT	Palmer 7'; Bodin 13'; Kilkenny (yellow card) 40'; Tabor (yellow card) 79'	Report	Green 22'; Rose 41' (pen.); Turi (yellow card) 67'; McEachran (yellow card) 86'	Stadium: County Ground; Attendance: 8,087; Referee: Ollie Yates

29 November 2025 18	Chesterfield	1–2	Swindon Town	Chesterfield
15:00 GMT	Fleck 10'; Tanton (yellow card) 39'	Report	Munroe 8' (yellow card) 69' (yellow-red card) 90+1'; Snowdon 61'; Drinan (yellow card) 63'; Glatzel (yellow card) 75'; Ripley (yellow card) 84'	Stadium: SMH Group Stadium; Attendance: 8,258; Referee: Jacob Miles

9 December 2025 19	Swindon Town	0–1	Cheltenham Town	Swindon
19:45 GMT	Nichols (yellow card) 41'; Knight-Lebel (yellow card) 45+1'	Report	Archer 59'; Jude-Boyd (yellow card) 68'; Day (yellow card) 90+5'	Stadium: County Ground; Attendance: 7,540; Referee: Simon Mather

13 December 2025 20	Bristol Rovers	0–3	Swindon Town	Horfield
12:30 GMT	Forde (yellow card) 27'; Łopata (red card) 36'	Report	Snowdon 16'; Clarke 28'; Drinan 33', (yellow card) 34' (yellow-red card) 58'	Stadium: Memorial Stadium; Attendance: 8,728; Referee: Aaron Bannister
Note: Fixture was originally scheduled for a 15:00 kick-off, but was rescheduled for live Sky Sports broadcasting.

20 December 2025 21	Swindon Town	1–0	Crawley Town	Swindon
15:00 GMT	Palmer 53' (pen.), (yellow card) 90+8'	Report	Forster (yellow card) 35'; Davies (yellow card) 51'; Williams (yellow card) 82'	Stadium: County Ground; Attendance: 8,172; Referee: Leigh Doughty

26 December 2025 22	Milton Keynes Dons	1–0	Swindon Town	Denbigh
15:00 GMT	Nemane 17'; Collar (yellow card) 38'	Report	Munroe (yellow card) 21'; Oldaker (yellow card) 53'	Stadium: Stadium MK; Attendance: 9,839; Referee: Ben Atkinson

29 December 2025 23	Cheltenham Town	0–2	Swindon Town	Cheltenham
19:45 GMT		Report	McGregor (yellow card) 54'; Drinan 57'; Mabete 75'; Ball (yellow card) 90+5'	Stadium: Whaddon Road; Attendance: 5,980; Referee: Isaac Searle

1 January 2026 24	Swindon Town	2–0	Gillingham	Swindon
15:00 GMT	Mabete (yellow card) 25'; Tafazolli 59'; Nichols (yellow card) 83'; Tabor (yellow card) 86'; Ripley (yellow card) 89'; Drinan 90+1'	Report	Andrews (yellow card) 60'; Clark (yellow card) 83'; Little (yellow card) 87'	Stadium: County Ground; Attendance: 9,986; Referee: James Durkin

17 January 2026 27	Swindon Town	2–3	Salford City	Swindon
15:00 GMT	McGregor 35'; Snowdon (yellow card) 56'; Drinan 77'; Wright (yellow card) 87'	Report	Turton 24'; N'Mai 31'; Austerfield (yellow card) 39'; Cooper (yellow card) 65'; Garbutt (yellow card) 67'; Cesay 72'; Woodburn (yellow card) 73'	Stadium: County Ground; Attendance: 8,129; Referee: Charles Breakspear

24 January 2026 28	Bromley	2–1	Swindon Town	Bromley
15:00 GMT	Arthurs (yellow card) 45+2'; Charles 46'; Kabamba 89'; Smith (yellow card) 90+6'	Report	Holman 10'	Stadium: Hayes Lane; Referee: James Oldham

27 January 2026 29	Notts County	2–1	Swindon Town	Nottingham
19:45 GMT	Jatta 44'; Dennis 66'	Report	Clarke 39'	Stadium: Meadow Lane; Attendance: 8,931; Referee: David Webb

31 January 2026 30	Swindon Town	3–1	Barrow	Swindon
15:00 GMT				Stadium: County Ground

3 February 2026 25	Harrogate Town	0–1	Swindon Town	Harrogate
19:45 GMT	Morris (yellow card) 39'	Report	Clarke (yellow card) 23'; Drinan 84' (pen.)	Stadium: Wetherby Road; Attendance: 2,205; Referee: Ross Martin
Note: Fixture was originally scheduled for 4 January, but it was postponed due to a frozen pitch.

7 February 2026 31	Swindon Town	3–0	Oldham Athletic	Swindon
12:30 GMT	Scanlon 23'; Wilson-Brown (yellow card) 37'; Snowdon (yellow card) 63'; Holman 73'; Batty (yellow card) 90+3'; Drinan 90+6'	Report	Caprice (yellow card) 17'; Daniels (yellow card) 31'	Stadium: County Ground; Attendance: 7,183; Referee: David Rock
Note: Fixture was initially scheduled for a 15:00 kick-off, but was rescheduled for live Sky Sports broadcasting.

11 February 2026 26	Swindon Town	2–0	Newport County	Swindon
20:00 GMT	Holman 63'; Thomas 66' (o.g.)			Stadium: County Ground; Attendance: 6,810; Referee: Darren Drysdale
Note: Fixture was originally scheduled for 10 January, but was rearranged due to FA Cup progression.

14 February 2026 32	Shrewsbury Town	3–1	Swindon Town	Shrewsbury
15:00 GMT	Morgan 7', (yellow card) 45+5'; Hoole (yellow card) 22'; Berkoe (yellow card) 32'; Lloyd 58'; Freeman 82'		Clarke (yellow card) 31'; Kirkman 45+2'; Ball (yellow card) 45+5'; Borland (yellow card) 88'	Stadium: New Meadow; Attendance: 7,403; Referee: Harry Wager

17 February 2026 33	Barnet	1–2	Swindon Town	Edgware
19:45 GMT	Senior 9'; Winterburn (yellow card) 84'	Report	Clarke 50', 63'; Snowdon (yellow card) 90+6'	Stadium: The Hive Stadium; Attendance: 2,880; Referee: Craig Hicks

21 February 2026 34	Swindon Town	1–2	Crewe Alexandra	Swindon
12:30 GMT	Drinan (yellow card) 45+3'; Olakigbe 64'	Report	Pond (yellow card) 27'; Holíček 45+2'; March 53'	Stadium: County Ground; Attendance: 7,485; Referee: Kirsty Dowle
Note: Fixture was initially scheduled for a 15:00 kick-off, but was rescheduled for live Sky Sports broadcasting.

28 February 2026 35	Swindon Town	1–1	Bristol Rovers	Swindon
12:30 GMT	Clarke (yellow card) 32'; Palmer 58'	Report	Balmer (yellow card) 32'; Thompson-Sommers 43'; Senior (yellow card) 83'; Quigley (yellow card) 88'; Smallwood (yellow card) 90'	Stadium: County Ground; Attendance: 12,383; Referee: Ruebyn Ricardo
Note: Fixture was initially scheduled for a 15:00 kick-off, but was rescheduled after consultations with local authorities.

7 March 2026 36	Crawley Town	2–2	Swindon Town	Crawley
15:00 GMT	Lolos 48', (yellow card) 90+3'; Gordon 90+8'	Report	Kilkenny (yellow card) 45'; Drinan 66' (pen.); Bodin 90+1'	Stadium: Broadfield Stadium; Attendance: 1,424; Referee: Simon Mather

14 March 2026 37	Swindon Town	1–2	Milton Keynes Dons	Swindon
15:00 GMT	Wright (yellow card) 30'; Hoilett (yellow card) 49'; Clarke 56'	Report	Gilbey 36'; Crowley (yellow card) 47'; Ekpiteta 79'	Stadium: County Ground; Attendance: 8,833; Referee: Jamie O'Connor

17 March 2026 38	Gillingham	0–2	Swindon Town	Gillingham
19:45 GMT	Beckles (yellow card) 27'	Report	Wright (yellow card) 43'; Tafazolli (yellow card) 45'; Drinan 68', (yellow card) 77'; Holman 86'	Stadium: Priestfield Stadium; Attendance: 4,991; Referee: Emily Heaslip

21 March 2026 39	Tranmere Rovers	0–1	Swindon Town	Birkenhead
15:00 GMT	Solomon (yellow card) 69'	Report	Hoilett 90+1'	Stadium: Prenton Park; Attendance: 5,762; Referee: Thomas Parsons

28 March 2026 40	Swindon Town	1–1	Fleetwood Town	Swindon
15:00 GMT	Tafazolli (yellow card) 25'; Kirkman (yellow card) 28'; Bodin 45+3'; Knight-Lebel (yellow card) 86'	Report	Neal (yellow card) 18'; Potter (yellow card) 41'; Helm 57'; Clark (yellow card) 69'	Stadium: County Ground; Attendance: 7,743; Referee: Michael Barlow

2 April 2026 41	Cambridge United	1–1	Swindon Town	Cambridge
20:00 BST	Knight 21'	Report	Nichols (yellow card) 16'; Borland (yellow card) 83'; Gibbons 90' (o.g.)	Stadium: Abbey Stadium; Attendance: 7,366; Referee: Matt Corlett
Note: Fixture was initially scheduled for 3 April, but was moved for Sky Sports broadcasting.

6 April 2026 42	Swindon Town	2–1	Walsall	Swindon
15:00 BST	Clarke (yellow card) 80'; Holman 81'; Drinan 90+2'	Report	Jellis 66'; Flint (yellow card) 88'	Stadium: County Ground; Attendance: 8,981; Referee: Elliott Swallow

10 April 2025 43	Colchester United	3–0	Swindon Town	Colchester
19:45 BST	Read 48'; Goodwin 54'; Iandolo (yellow card) 63'; Anderson 69'	Report	Ball (red card) 29'	Stadium: Colchester Community Stadium; Attendance: 4,880; Referee: Paul Howard
Note: Fixture was originally scheduled for 11 April, but was moved following a request from Colchester.

18 April 2026 44	Swindon Town	2–2	Accrington Stanley	Swindon
12:30 BST	Palmer 18'; Drinan 20'	Report	Woods 1'; Coyle (yellow card) 63'; Butterfield 90+2'	Stadium: County Ground; Attendance: 8,435; Referee: Declan Brown
Note: Fixture was initially scheduled for a 15:00 kick-off, but was brought forward for Sky Sports broadcasting.

25 April 2026 45	Grimsby Town	4–0	Swindon Town	Cleethorpes
12:30 BST	Kabia 8' (pen.), 43', 58'; Kacurri 22'	Report	Mabete (yellow card) 88'; McGregor (yellow card) 90+6'	Stadium: Blundell Park; Attendance: 8,167; Referee: Carl Brook
Note: Fixture was initially scheduled for a 15:00 kick-off, but was brought forward for live Sky Sports broadcasting.

2 May 2026 46	Swindon Town	1–2	Chesterfield	Swindon
15:00 BST	Wilson-Brown (yellow card) 18'; Middlemas 45+3' (yellow card) 75'; Hoilett (yellow card) 51'	Report	Bonis 19' (yellow card) 78'; Stirk (yellow card) 58'; Markanday 61'	Stadium: County Ground; Attendance: 12,989; Referee: Scott Oldham

=== FA Cup ===
Swindon were drawn away to Rotherham United in the first round, at home to Bolton Wanderers in the second round and away to Salford City in the third round.

Win Draw Loss Fixtures

1 November 2025 First round	Rotherham United	1–2 (a.e.t.)	Swindon Town	Rotherham
15:00 GMT	Nombe 5'; Gore (yellow card) 87'; Hugill (yellow card) 120'	Report	Palmer 72'; Drinan (yellow card) 86', (red card) 90+7'; Oldaker (yellow card) 90+6', (goal) 116'; Bodin (yellow card) 114'	Stadium: New York Stadium; Attendance: 3,351; Referee: Martin Woods

6 December 2025 Second round	Swindon Town	4–0	Bolton Wanderers	Swindon
15:00 GMT	Drinan 8' (pen.), 76', 86'; Clarke (yellow card) 49'; Snowdon 55'	Report	Taylor (yellow card) 53'	Stadium: County Ground; Attendance: 9,364; Referee: Lee Swabey

20 January 2026 Third round	Salford City	3–2	Swindon Town	Kersal
19:45 GMT	Graydon 11', 52'; Woodburn (yellow card) 55'; Garbutt 68'	Report	Kirkman (yellow card) 34'; Palmer 55'; McGregor (yellow card) 58'; Ball 60'	Stadium: Moor Lane; Attendance: 2,215; Referee: Alex Chilowicz
Note: Fixture was postponed due to a frozen pitch.

=== EFL Cup ===
Swindon were drawn away to Cardiff City in the first round.

Win Draw Loss Fixtures

12 August 2025 First round	Cardiff City	2–1	Swindon Town	Leckwith
19:45 BST	Ashford 21'; Colwill 45+2'; Kpakio (yellow card) 60'	Report	Clarke (yellow card) 52'; Ehibhatiomhan 55'; McGregor (yellow card) 80'	Stadium: Cardiff City Stadium; Attendance: 7,160; Referee: Elliot Bell

=== EFL Trophy ===
Swindon were drawn against Milton Keynes Dons, Reading and West Ham United U21 in the group stage. After winning the group, Town were drawn at home to Peterborough United in the round of 32. and away to Luton Town in the round of 16. They were expelled from the competition on 4 February after playing two ineligible players against Luton.

Pos	Div	Team	Pld	W	PW	PL	L	GF	GA	GD	Pts	Qualification
1	L2	Swindon Town	3	2	0	0	1	9	5	+4	6	Advance to Round 2
2	ACA	West Ham United U21	3	2	0	0	1	9	6	+3	6	Advance to Round 2
3	L1	Reading	3	2	0	0	1	6	4	+2	6	
4	L2	Milton Keynes Dons	3	0	0	0	3	1	10	−9	0	

Source: EFL

Win Draw Loss Fixtures

2 September 2025 South Group D	Swindon Town	3–2	Reading	Swindon
19:00 BST	Ehibhatiomhan 11'; Palmer 24'; Wright 47'	Report	Ward 36' (o.g.); Marriott 44'; Abrefa (yellow card) 67'	Stadium: County Ground; Attendance: 3,667; Referee: Sam Mulhall

28 October 2025 South Group D	Swindon Town	2–3	West Ham United U21	Swindon
19:00 GMT	Mabete (yellow card) 40'; Glatzel 51', 71'; McGregor (yellow card) 88', (red card) 90+10'	Report	Ajala 25'; Earthy 42'; Landers 69'; Golambeckis (yellow card) 75'; Oyebade (yellow card) 90+2'	Stadium: County Ground

11 November 2025 South Group D	Milton Keynes Dons	0–4	Swindon Town	Denbigh
19:00 GMT	Medwynter (yellow card) 45+6'	Report	Clarke 11', (yellow card) 14'; Drinan 32' (pen.), 35', 71'; Bodin (yellow card) 38'; Munroe (yellow card) 73'; Mabete (yellow card) 90+2'	Stadium: Stadium MK; Attendance: 1,036; Referee: Elliott Swallow

2 December 2025 Round of 32	Swindon Town	1–0	Peterborough United	Swindon
19:30 GMT	Munroe (yellow card) 63'; Clarke 88'	Report		Stadium: County Ground; Attendance: 2,135; Referee: Dale Baines

13 January 2026 Round of 16	Luton Town	1–2	Swindon Town	Luton
19:00 GMT	Yates 7' (pen.); Walters (yellow card) 78'; Archer (yellow card) 90+8'	Report	Mabete (yellow card) 22', (goal) 53'; Wright 37'; McGregor (yellow card) 60'	Stadium: Kenilworth Road; Attendance: 3,243; Referee: Peter Wright

== Statistics ==
=== Appearances and goals ===
As of match played 2 May 2026

Players with no appearances are not included on the list; italics indicate loaned in player

No.	Pos	Nat	Player	Total		League Two		FA Cup		EFL Cup		EFL Trophy	
No.	Pos	Nat	Player	Apps	Goals	Apps	Goals	Apps	Goals	Apps	Goals	Apps	Goals
1	GK	(England) ENG	Connor Ripley	50	0	46+0	0	3+0	0	1+0	0	0+0	0
3	DF	(Democratic Republic of the Congo) COD	Filozofe Mabete	33	2	12+14	1	2+0	0	1+0	0	3+1	1
4	DF	(Republic of Ireland) IRL	Ryan Delaney	4	0	0+1	0	0+0	0	0+0	0	2+1	0
5	DF	(England) ENG	Will Wright	43	3	31+3	1	2+1	0	1+0	0	3+2	2
6	MF	(England) ENG	James Ball	28	1	12+9	0	0+2	1	1+0	0	3+1	0
7	FW	(England) ENG	Tom Nichols	46	1	33+7	1	3+0	0	0+0	0	0+3	0
8	MF	(England) ENG	Ollie Clarke	36	8	24+4	6	2+0	0	0+1	0	4+1	2
9	MF	(Germany) GER	Paul Glatzel	26	4	13+8	2	1+0	0	1+0	0	2+1	2
10	FW	(England) ENG	Harry Smith	5	1	4+0	1	0+0	0	1+0	0	0+0	0
11	FW	(England) ENG	Jake Tabor	14	0	0+9	0	0+2	0	0+1	0	0+2	0
12	GK	(England) ENG	Lewis Ward	6	0	0+0	0	0+0	0	0+1	0	5+0	0
14	FW	(England) ENG	Danny Butterworth	11	0	1+9	0	0+0	0	0+0	0	1+0	0
16	DF	(England) ENG	Tom Wilson-Brown	26	0	19+3	0	1+0	0	1+0	0	2+0	0
17	DF	(England) ENG	Ryan Tafazolli	24	2	20+2	2	1+0	0	0+0	0	1+0	0
18	MF	(Republic of Ireland) IRL	Gavin Kilkenny	47	1	37+2	1	3+0	0	1+0	0	3+1	0
19	MF	(England) ENG	Joe Snowdon	40	4	26+7	3	2+1	1	0+0	0	1+3	0
20	MF	(England) ENG	Ben Middlemas	4	1	1+3	1	0+0	0	0+0	0	0+0	0
21	FW	(Gibraltar) GIB	James Scanlon	6	1	3+3	1	0+0	0	0+0	0	0+0	0
22	DF	(Canada) CAN	Jamie Knight-Lebel	35	1	27+3	1	1+1	0	0+0	0	3+0	0
23	FW	(Republic of Ireland) IRL	Aaron Drinan	46	28	40+0	22	3+0	3	0+0	0	1+2	3
24	FW	(England) ENG	Fletcher Holman	22	5	7+15	5	0+0	0	0+0	0	0+0	0
25	MF	(Scotland) SCO	Aidan Borland	18	0	10+6	0	0+1	0	0+0	0	1+0	0
26	DF	(England) ENG	Jake Batty	17	0	14+3	0	0+0	0	0+0	0	0+0	0
28	FW	(England) ENG	Ollie Palmer	45	11	25+16	8	2+0	2	0+0	0	2+0	1
29	FW	(England) ENG	Michael Olakigbe	18	1	4+12	1	1+0	0	0+0	0	1+0	0
30	FW	(Canada) CAN	Junior Hoilett	14	1	10+4	1	0+0	0	0+0	0	0+0	0
31	FW	(Wales) WAL	Billy Bodin	34	4	9+18	4	1+1	0	1+0	0	4+0	0
33	DF	(England) ENG	Joel McGregor	43	1	17+18	1	2+1	0	1+0	0	3+1	0
34	DF	(England) ENG	Billy Kirkman	15	1	5+5	1	2+0	0	0+0	0	1+2	0
37	MF	(Spain) ESP	Dani González	2	0	0+1	0	0+0	0	0+0	0	0+1	0
44	MF	(England) ENG	Darren Oldaker	45	2	30+9	1	1+1	1	0+1	0	1+2	0
45	MF	(England) ENG	Harry Gray	2	0	0+1	0	0+0	0	0+0	0	1+0	0
Players who featured but departed the club during the season:
17	FW	(Iraq) IRQ	Botan Ameen	2	0	0+2	0	0+0	0	0+0	0	0+0	0
20	FW	(England) ENG	Princewill Ehibhatiomhan	21	3	2+12	1	0+2	0	1+0	1	4+0	1
21	MF	(Republic of Ireland) IRL	Adam Murphy	5	0	1+2	0	0+1	0	0+0	0	1+0	0
26	DF	(England) ENG	Finley Munroe	27	2	23+0	2	0+0	0	0+1	0	2+1	0

=== Goals record ===
As of match played 2 May 2026

Rank	No.	Nat.	Pos.	Name	League Two	FA Cup	EFL Cup	EFL Trophy	Total
1	23	(Republic of Ireland)	FW	Aaron Drinan	22	3	0	3	28
2	28	(England)	FW	Ollie Palmer	8	2	0	1	11
3	8	(England)	MF	Ollie Clarke	6	0	0	2	8
4	24	(England)	FW	Fletcher Holman	5	0	0	0	5
5	9	(Germany)	FW	Paul Glatzel	2	0	0	2	4
5	19	(England)	MF	Joe Snowdon	3	1	0	0	4
5	31	(Wales)	FW	Billy Bodin	4	0	0	0	4
7	5	(England)	DF	Will Wright	1	0	0	2	3
7	20	(England)	FW	Princewill Ehibhatiomhan	1	0	1	1	3
10	3	(Democratic Republic of the Congo)	DF	Filozofe Mabete	1	0	0	1	2
10	17	(England)	DF	Ryan Tafazolli	2	0	0	0	2
10	26	(England)	DF	Finley Munroe	2	0	0	0	2
10	44	(England)	MF	Darren Oldaker	1	1	0	0	2
10	own goals				2	0	0	0	2
12	6	(England)	MF	James Ball	1	0	0	0	1
12	7	(England)	FW	Tom Nichols	1	0	0	0	1
12	10	(England)	FW	Harry Smith	1	0	0	0	1
12	18	(Republic of Ireland)	MF	Gavin Kilkenny	1	0	0	0	1
12	20	(England)	FW	Ben Middlemas	1	0	0	0	1
12	21	(Gibraltar)	FW	James Scanlon	1	0	0	0	1
12	22	(Canada)	DF	Jamie Knight-Lebel	1	0	0	0	1
12	29	(England)	FW	Michael Olakigbe	1	0	0	0	1
12	30	(Canada)	FW	Junior Hoilett	1	0	0	0	1
12	33	(England)	DF	Joel McGregor	1	0	0	0	1
12	34	(England)	DF	Billy Kirkman	1	0	0	0	1
Total					70	8	1	12	91

=== Disciplinary record ===
As of match played 2 May 2026

Rank	No.	Nat.	Pos.	Name	League Two			FA Cup			EFL Cup			EFL Trophy			Total		
Rank	No.	Nat.	Pos.	Name	Yellow card	(yellow card) (yellow-red card)	Red card	Yellow card	(yellow card) (yellow-red card)	Red card	Yellow card	(yellow card) (yellow-red card)	Red card	Yellow card	(yellow card) (yellow-red card)	Red card	Yellow card	(yellow card) (yellow-red card)	Red card
1	23	(Republic of Ireland)	FW	Aaron Drinan	4	1	0	1	0	1	0	0	0	0	0	0	5	1	1
2	7	(England)	FW	Tom Nichols	9	0	0	0	0	0	0	0	0	0	0	0	9	0	0
2	8	(England)	MF	Ollie Clarke	4	0	1	1	0	0	0	0	0	1	0	0	6	0	1
2	26	(England)	DF	Finley Munroe	6	1	0	0	0	0	0	0	0	1	0	0	7	1	0
2	33	(England)	DF	Joel McGregor	3	0	0	1	0	0	1	0	0	2	0	1	7	0	1
6	3	(Democratic Republic of the Congo)	DF	Filozofe Mabete	4	0	0	0	0	0	0	0	0	3	0	0	7	0	0
7	5	(England)	DF	Will Wright	5	0	0	0	0	0	0	0	0	0	0	0	5	0	0
7	18	(Republic of Ireland)	MF	Gavin Kilkenny	5	0	0	0	0	0	0	0	0	0	0	0	5	0	0
7	19	(England)	MF	Joe Snowdon	5	0	0	0	0	0	0	0	0	0	0	0	5	0	0
10	1	(England)	GK	Connor Ripley	4	0	0	0	0	0	0	0	0	0	0	0	4	0	0
10	22	(Canada)	DF	Jamie Knight-Lebel	4	0	0	0	0	0	0	0	0	0	0	0	4	0	0
11	6	(England)	MF	James Ball	2	0	1	0	0	0	0	0	0	0	0	0	2	0	1
11	16	(England)	DF	Tom Wilson-Brown	3	0	0	0	0	0	0	0	0	0	0	0	3	0	0
11	17	(England)	DF	Ryan Tafazolli	3	0	0	0	0	0	0	0	0	0	0	0	3	0	0
11	31	(Wales)	FW	Billy Bodin	1	0	0	1	0	0	0	0	0	1	0	0	3	0	0
11	44	(England)	MF	Darren Oldaker	2	0	0	1	0	0	0	0	0	0	0	0	3	0	0
14	9	(Germany)	FW	Paul Glatzel	2	0	0	0	0	0	0	0	0	0	0	0	2	0	0
14	10	(England)	FW	Harry Smith	2	0	0	0	0	0	0	0	0	0	0	0	2	0	0
14	11	(England)	FW	Jake Tabor	2	0	0	0	0	0	0	0	0	0	0	0	2	0	0
14	14	(England)	FW	Danny Butterworth	2	0	0	0	0	0	0	0	0	0	0	0	2	0	0
14	25	(Scotland)	MF	Aidan Borland	2	0	0	0	0	0	0	0	0	0	0	0	2	0	0
14	28	(England)	FW	Ollie Palmer	2	0	0	0	0	0	0	0	0	0	0	0	2	0	0
14	34	(England)	DF	Billy Kirkman	1	0	0	1	0	0	0	0	0	0	0	0	2	0	0
14	30	(Canada)	FW	Junior Hoilett	2	0	0	0	0	0	0	0	0	0	0	0	2	0	0
23	20	(England)	MF	Ben Middlemas	1	0	0	0	0	0	0	0	0	0	0	0	1	0	0
23	21	(Republic of Ireland)	MF	Adam Murphy	1	0	0	0	0	0	0	0	0	0	0	0	1	0	0
23	26	(England)	DF	Jake Batty	1	0	0	0	0	0	0	0	0	0	0	0	1	0	0
Total					82	2	2	6	0	1	1	0	0	8	0	1	97	2	4
