= Gavin Kilkenny =

Irish footballer (born 2000)

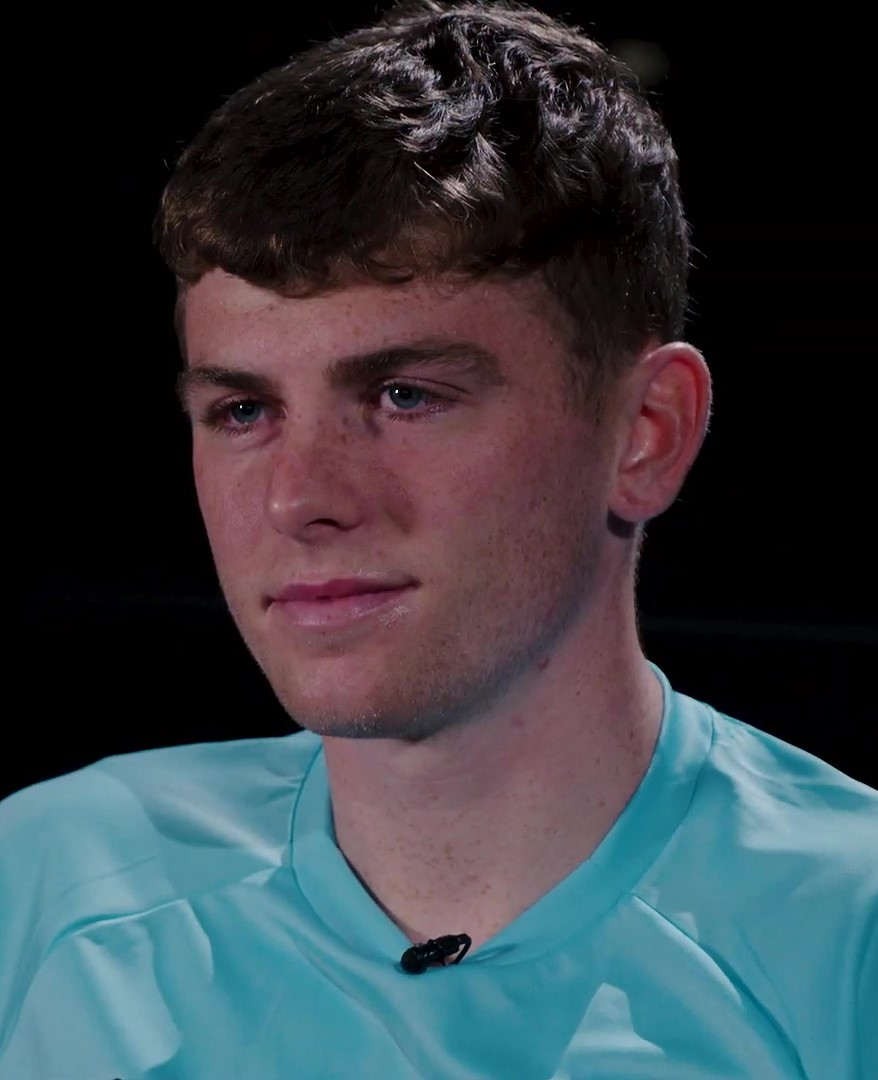
- Kilkenny with AFC Bournemouth in 2021

Personal information
- Full name: Gavin Kilkenny
- Date of birth: 1 February 2000 (age 26)
- Place of birth: Dublin, Ireland
- Height: 1.70 m (5 ft 7 in)
- Position: Central midfielder

Team information
- Current team: Swindon Town
- Number: 4

Youth career
- –2016: St Kevin's Boys
- 2016–2019: AFC Bournemouth

Senior career*
Years	Team	Apps	(Gls)
2019–2024	AFC Bournemouth	15	(0)
2022–2023	→ Stoke City (loan)	3	(0)
2023	→ Charlton Athletic (loan)	8	(0)
2024	→ Fleetwood Town (loan)	16	(1)
2024–	Swindon Town	78	(2)

International career
2017	Republic of Ireland U18	3	(0)
2019–2022	Republic of Ireland U21	20	(0)
- * Club domestic league appearances and goals as of 20:47, 18 March 2026 (UTC)

Gavin Kilkenny (born 1 February 2000) is an Irish footballer who plays as a central midfielder for EFL League Two club Swindon Town.

== Early life ==
Raised in Beaumont, a northern suburb of Dublin, Kilkenny started out his footballing career at St Kevin's Boys, a schoolboy team with several notable graduates, such as Damien Duff, Jeff Hendrick, Dara O'Shea, Robbie Brady and Ian Harte. Kilkenny left home at the age of 16 to join AFC Bournemouth, having excelled as a youngster at Gaelic football and hurling.

== Club career ==
=== AFC Bournemouth ===
Kilkenny joined AFC Bournemouth at the age of sixteen. He moved into the club's under-21 squad after serving a two-year scholarship in the under-18s and was quickly elevated to the first team in the summer of 2019, having signed his first professional contract in April 2018. Kilkenny starred and scored in an impressive 3–0 pre-season friendly win over Lyon, being named man-of-the-match. He made his debut for the club starting in a 0–0 draw against Forest Green Rovers in the EFL Cup on 28 August 2019. He then appeared in the following round, starting in a 2–0 away loss to Burton Albion. Kilkenny made his first appearance of the 2023–2024 season for Bournemouth in their 5-0 FA Cup defeat of Swansea on 25 January 2024, when he came on as a 57th-minute substitute for the injured James Hill.

==== Stoke City, Charlton Athletic & Fleetwood Town loans ====
On 2 July 2022, Kilkenny joined Stoke City on loan for the 2022–23 season. He only made four appearances for Stoke and returned to Bournemouth in January 2023.

On 31 January 2023, Kilkenny joined Charlton Athletic on loan for the rest of the 2022–23 season.

On 1 February 2024, Kilkenny joined Fleetwood Town on loan for the rest of the 2023–24 season.

=== Swindon Town ===
Kilkenny joined League Two side Swindon Town on 30 August 2024.

== International career ==
Kilkenny is a youth international for the Republic of Ireland, having experience playing in the U18s squads and the U21s.

== Career statistics ==
As of match played 21 March 2026

Club	Season	League			FA Cup		League Cup		Other		Total	
Club	Season	Division	Apps	Goals	Apps	Goals	Apps	Goals	Apps	Goals	Apps	Goals
AFC Bournemouth	2019–20	Premier League	0	0	0	0	2	0	—		2	0
AFC Bournemouth	2020–21	Championship	1	0	2	0	1	0	—		4	0
AFC Bournemouth	2021–22	Championship	14	0	2	0	2	0	—		18	0
AFC Bournemouth	2022–23	Premier League	0	0	0	0	0	0	—		0	0
AFC Bournemouth	2023–24	Premier League	0	0	1	0	0	0	—		1	0
AFC Bournemouth	Total		15	0	5	0	5	0	0	0	25	0
Stoke City (loan)	2022–23	Championship	3	0	0	0	1	0	—		4	0
Charlton Athletic (loan)	2022–23	League One	8	0	—		—		—		8	0
Fleetwood Town (loan)	2023–24	League One	16	1	—		—		—		16	1
Swindon Town	2024–25	League Two	42	1	2	0	0	0	4 (Note: Appearances in EFL Trophy)	0	48	1
Swindon Town	2025–26	League Two	36	1	3	0	1	0	4	0	44	1
Swindon Town	Total		78	2	5	0	1	0	8	0	92	2
Career total			120	3	10	0	7	0	8	0	145	3

== Honours ==
AFC Bournemouth

- Championship runner-up: 2021–22
