= Tom Wilson-Brown =

English footballer (born 2004)

Personal information
- Full name: Thomas James Wilson-Brown
- Date of birth: 5 October 2004 (age 22)
- Place of birth: Leicester, England
- Height: 1.94 m (6 ft 4 in)
- Positions: Centre-back; left-back

Team information
- Current team: Stockport County

Youth career
- –2025: Leicester City

Senior career*
Years	Team	Apps	(Gls)
2025–2026	Leicester City	0	(0)
2025	→ Kilmarnock (loan)	0	(0)
2025–2026	→ Swindon Town (loan)	22	(0)
2026–	Stockport County	0	(0)
- * Club domestic league appearances and goals as of 18:46, 11 August 2026 (UTC)

Thomas James Wilson-Brown (born 5 October 2004) is an English professional footballer who plays as a centre-back for EFL League One club Stockport County.

== Career ==
A product of the Leicester City academy, Wilson-Brown played with the first-team in the 2023 pre-season despite predominantly being an under-18 player at the time. Able to play centre-back or left-back, he played six matches for Leicester City in the EFL Trophy in the 2024-25 season. In February 2025, he signed a new 18-month contract with Leicester.

On 3 February 2025, Wilson-Brown signed for Scottish Premiership club Kilmarnock on loan for the rest of the season. He featured on the bench but did not make any appearance for the club.

On 26 July 2025, Wilson-Brown signed for EFL League Two club Swindon Town on a season-long loan. He made his professional debut one week later, starting for Swindon in the league in a 2–1 away defeat against Walsall.

On 11 August 2026, Wilson-Brown signed permanently EFL League One club Stockport County.

== Career statistics ==
As of match played 6 October 2026

Appearances and goals by club, season and competition
Club	Season	League			National Cup		League Cup		Other		Total	
Club	Season	Division	Apps	Goals	Apps	Goals	Apps	Goals	Apps	Goals	Apps	Goals
Leicester City U21	2022–23	—			—		—		2 (Note: Appearances in EFL Trophy)	0	2	0
Leicester City U21	2023–24	—			—		—		2	0	2	0
Leicester City U21	2024–25	—			—		—		2	0	2	0
Leicester City U21	Total		—		—		—		6	0	6	0
Kilmarnock (loan)	2024–25	Scottish Premiership	0	0	—		—		—		0	0
Swindon Town (loan)	2025–26	EFL League Two	22	0	1	0	1	0	2	0	26	0
Stockport County	2026–27	EFL League One	0	0	0	0	0	0	2	0	2	0
Career total			22	0	1	0	1	0	10	0	34	0
