= Botan Ameen =

English-Iraqi footballer

Personal information
- Full name: Botan Ameen
- Date of birth: 24 April 2007 (age 19)
- Place of birth: Hammersmith and Fulham, England
- Positions: Forward; left winger

Team information
- Current team: Norwich City

Youth career
- –2023: Queens Park Rangers
- 2023–2024: Swindon Town

Senior career*
Years	Team	Apps	(Gls)
2024–2025	Swindon Town	16	(1)
2025–	Norwich City	0	(0)

International career^{‡}
2024–	Iraq U20	1	(0)
- * Club domestic league appearances and goals as of 17:00, 5 Aug 2025 (UTC) ‡ National team caps and goals as of 12:30, 13 Oct 2024 (UTC)

Botan Ameen (Arabic: بوتان أمين; born 24 April 2007) is a professional footballer who plays for EFL Championship club Norwich City. Born in England, he represents Iraq internationally at youth level.

== Club career ==
=== Swindon Town ===
After having been released from QPR academy at age 16 at the end of the 2022/23 season, Ameen was offered a scholarship with Swindon Town Academy. He played for the U-18 side throughout the 2023/24 season, scoring two goals against Manchester United in the FA Youth Cup. Swindon reached the quarter-final of the tournament, with Ameen scoring a total of three goals in four games during their campaign.

On 8 October 2024, Ameen made his senior debut, scoring his side's final goal in a 4–0 EFL Trophy victory over Bristol Rovers.

=== Norwich City ===
On 28 August 2025, Ameen signed for Championship club Norwich City on an initial three-year deal with the option for a further two years for an undisclosed fee, reported to be £250,000 plus a sell-on clause and a potential further £250,000 of performance related add-ons.

== International career ==
Eligible to represent them internationally despite being born in England, Ameen was called up in May 2024 for Iraq's under-20 side for two friendly games against Oman at Al-Shaab Stadium in Baghdad. He remained on the bench for both games. However, he was given a chance in two unofficial friendlies against Iraq Stars League sides Al-Zawraa and Al-Hudood. He was called up to the 2024 WAFF U-19 Championship in Saudi Arabia, making his official debut for the under-20 side coming on as a 69th-minute substitute against Jordan.

== Career statistics ==
As of match played 28 August 2025

Appearances and goals by club, season and competition
Club	Season	League			FA Cup		League Cup		Other		Total	
Club	Season	Division	Apps	Goals	Apps	Goals	Apps	Goals	Apps	Goals	Apps	Goals
Swindon Town	2024–25	League Two	14	1	0	0	0	0	3 (Note: Appearance(s) in EFL Trophy)	1	17	2
Swindon Town	2025–26	League Two	2	0	0	0	0	0	0	0	2	0
Career total			16	1	0	0	0	0	3	1	19	2
