= Joe Snowdon =

English footballer (born 2004)

Personal information
- Full name: Joseph Leonard Snowdon
- Date of birth: 14 February 2004 (age 22)
- Place of birth: Oldham, England
- Height: 1.74 m (5 ft 9 in)
- Position: Midfielder

Team information
- Current team: Swindon Town
- Number: 19

Youth career
- Manchester City
- 2020–2025: Leeds United

Senior career*
Years	Team	Apps	(Gls)
2025–	Swindon Town	43	(3)
- * Club domestic league appearances and goals as of 16:05, 14 November 2026 (UTC)

Joseph Leonard Snowdon (born 14 February 2004) is an English professional footballer who plays as a midfielder for Swindon Town.

== Career ==
Born in Oldham, Snowdon played for Manchester City and Leeds United, where he turned professional in 2021. He signed a new contract with the club in 2023 for one year, which was later extended for a further year, until summer 2025.

He signed for Swindon Town in June 2025. He was stated to be a replacement for Joel Cotterill, whose loan deal with Swindon had ended the previous season. Snowdon said he was ready to step up to senior football. In October 2025 he signed a new two-year contract with Swindon.

== Career statistics ==
As of match played 14 November 2026

Appearances and goals by club, season and competition
Club	Season	League			FA Cup		EFL Cup		Other		Total	
Club	Season	Division	Apps	Goals	Apps	Goals	Apps	Goals	Apps	Goals	Apps	Goals
Leeds United U21	2021–22	—			—		—		1 (Note: Appearance(s) in EFL Trophy)	0	1	0
Leeds United U21	2022–23	—			—		—		3	0	3	0
Leeds United U21	Total		—		—		—		4	0	4	0
Swindon Town	2025–26	League Two	33	3	3	1	0	0	4	0	40	4
Swindon Town	2026–27	League Two	10	0	1	0	0	0	1	0	12	0
Swindon Town	Total		43	3	4	1	0	0	5	0	52	4
Career total			43	3	4	1	0	0	9	0	56	4
