= Princewill Ehibhatiomhan =

English footballer (born 2005)

Personal information
- Full name: Princewill Omonefe Ehibhatiomhan
- Date of birth: 20 October 2005 (age 21)
- Place of birth: Milton Keynes, England
- Height: 1.91 m (6 ft 3 in)
- Position: Forward

Team information
- Current team: Southampton

Youth career
- –2023: Reading
- 2023–: Southampton

Senior career*
Years	Team	Apps	(Gls)
2025–	Southampton	0	(0)
2025–2026	→ Swindon Town (loan)	14	(1)
2026	→ Salford City (loan)	11	(0)
- * Club domestic league appearances and goals as of 05:10, 3 May 2026 (UTC)

Princewill Omonefe Ehibhatiomhan (born 20 October 2005) is an English professional footballer who plays as a forward for EFL Championship club Southampton.

== Career ==
On 31 August 2023, Ehibhatiomhan signed his first professional contract with Southampton. After signing a one-year contract extension with Southampton, on 11 August 2025, he joined League Two side Swindon Town on a season-long loan. On 12 August, Ehibhatiomhan scored on his debut in a 2–1 defeat against Cardiff City in the EFL Cup. On 5 January 2026, he was recalled from loan and returned to Southampton.

On 2 February 2026, Ehibhatiomhan joined Salford City on loan for the remainder of the 2025–26 season. He made his debut for the club on 5 February in a 1–0 defeat against Accrington Stanley after he replaced Rosaire Longelo in the 78th minute.

== Personal life ==
Born in England, Ehibhatiomhan is of Nigerian descent. His brother Kelvin is also a professional footballer.

== Career statistics ==
As of match played 2 May 2026

Appearances and goals by club, season and competition
Club	Season	League			FA Cup		League Cup		Other		Total	
Club	Season	Division	Apps	Goals	Apps	Goals	Apps	Goals	Apps	Goals	Apps	Goals
Southampton	2025–26	Championship	0	0	0	0	0	0	—		0	0
Southampton	2026–27	Championship	0	0	0	0	0	0	—		0	0
Southampton	Total		0	0	0	0	0	0	—		0	0
Swindon Town (loan)	2025–26	League Two	14	1	2	0	1	1	4 (Note: Appearances in EFL Trophy)	1	21	3
Salford City (loan)	2025–26	League Two	11	0	1	0	—		0	0	12	0
Career total			25	1	3	0	1	1	4	1	33	3
