= Connor Ripley =

English footballer (born 1993)

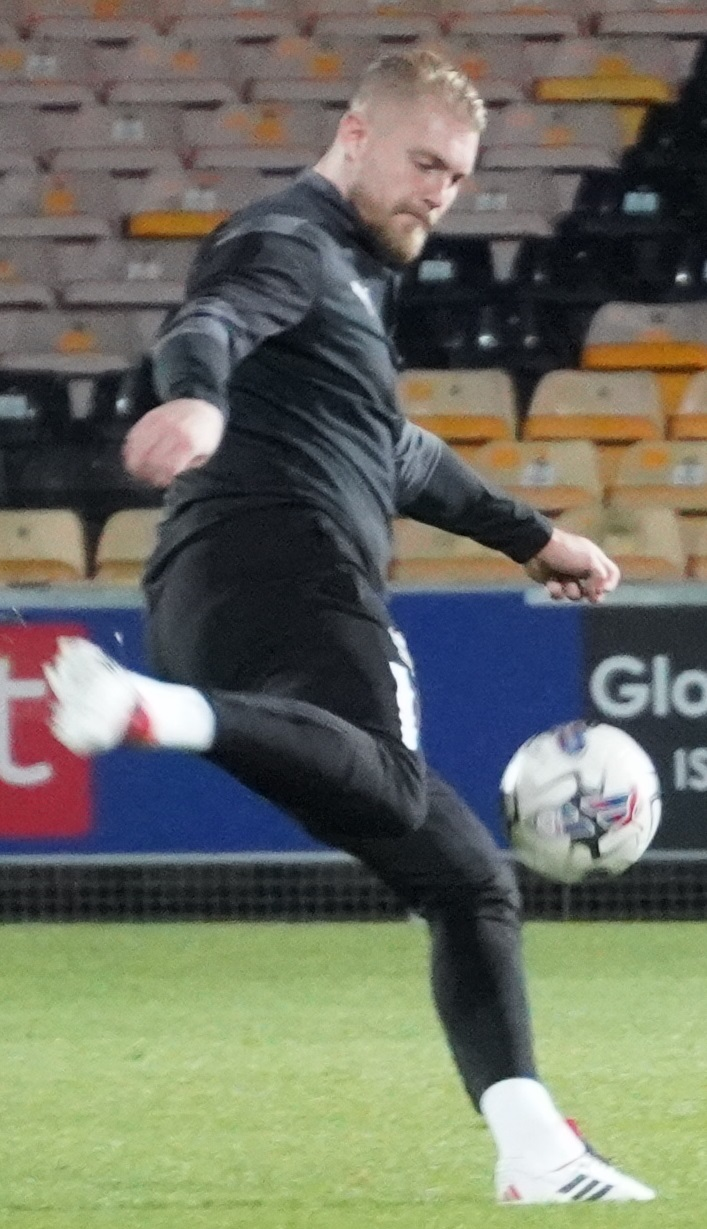
- Ripley warming up at Vale Park in 2023

Personal information
- Full name: Connor James Ripley
- Date of birth: 13 February 1993 (age 33)
- Place of birth: Middlesbrough, England
- Height: 6 ft 3 in (1.91 m)
- Position: Goalkeeper

Team information
- Current team: Swindon Town
- Number: 1

Youth career
- Blackburn Rovers
- 2009–2011: Middlesbrough

Senior career*
Years	Team	Apps	(Gls)
2011–2019	Middlesbrough	2	(0)
2012	→ Oxford United (loan)	1	(0)
2013–2014	→ Bradford City (loan)	0	(0)
2014	→ Östersund (loan)	14	(0)
2015–2016	→ Motherwell (loan)	36	(0)
2016–2017	→ Oldham Athletic (loan)	46	(0)
2017–2018	→ Burton Albion (loan)	2	(0)
2018	→ Bury (loan)	15	(0)
2018–2019	→ Accrington Stanley (loan)	21	(0)
2019–2022	Preston North End	3	(0)
2021	→ Salford City (loan)	7	(0)
2022–2023	Morecambe	45	(0)
2023–2025	Port Vale	69	(0)
2025–	Swindon Town	76	(0)

International career
2011–2012	England U19	4	(0)
2013	England U20	1	(0)
- * Club domestic league appearances and goals as of 13:35, 22 November 2026 (UTC)

Connor James Ripley (born 13 February 1993) is an English professional footballer who plays as a goalkeeper for EFL League Two club Swindon Town.

Ripley turned professional at his local team Middlesbrough – where his father, Stuart, had played – in January 2011, though he would play only three first-team games in eight years at the club. He represented England up to under-20 level and had eight loan spells, playing for Oxford United, Bradford City, Östersund (Sweden), Motherwell (Scotland), Oldham Athletic, Burton Albion, Bury, and Accrington Stanley. He signed with Preston North End in January 2019, from where he was loaned out to Salford City in October 2021. He played ten games for Preston during his three and a half years at the club before joining Morecambe in June 2022. He was named as League One Player of the Month for November, winning the club's Player of the Year award for the 2022–23 season. He signed with Port Vale in June 2023 and played 79 games before he left to join fellow League Two side Swindon Town in February 2025.

== Early and personal life ==
Connor James Ripley was born in Middlesbrough on 13 February 1993; his father is former England winger Stuart Ripley. He grew up in the Ribble Valley attending St Leonards C of E Primary School in Langho and Ribblesdale High School in Clitheroe. He met partner Shauneen whilst playing for Oldham. His son was born in 2016. By 2019, he had four children, and had another child in December 2024. He is fluent in French after having spent three years living in Switzerland as a boy.

== Club career ==
=== Middlesbrough ===
Ripley began his career with Blackburn Rovers. After moving to Middlesbrough on a two-year scholarship in June 2009, he signed a two-and-a-half-year professional contract in January 2011. He was initially brought in to train with the first-team by manager Gordon Strachan, though would make his senior debut under Tony Mowbray. Ripley made his professional debut in a 5–2 loss to Reading on 5 March 2011, conceding three goals after coming on as a substitute for Jason Steele. Ripley made his full debut on 14 January 2012, in a 2–0 loss to Burnley at the Riverside Stadium, where he allowed Kieran Trippier's long-range effort slip under his body for Burnley's second goal.

On 27 April 2012, he joined League Two club Oxford United on an emergency loan after both their goalkeepers had suffered injuries. Ripley made his only appearance for Oxford United the next day, in a 2–0 loss to Southend United at the Kassam Stadium. After this, manager Chris Wilder was unhappy with Ripley's performance and decided to terminate his loan spell at the club, replacing him with Emiliano Martínez. After returning to Middlesbrough, Ripley became the third-choice goalkeeper for the 2012–13 season and signed a new three-year contract with the club in January 2013.

He moved on loan to League One side Bradford City on 3 August 2013, and later spoke about his hope of extending the month-long deal. The deal was extended until January, despite him being limited to a place on the bench as Jon McLaughlin's deputy. The loan deal ended in January 2014 after he played just one Football League Trophy match for Phil Parkinson. On 3 March 2014, Ripley joined Swedish side Östersund, playing in the Superettan for the remainder of the 2014 season. Ripley went on to make 14 appearances under Graham Potter, having faced competition from Peter Augustsson and Aly Keita. Upon his return to Middlesbrough in October 2014, Ripley was praised by Peter Beardsley.

He signed a new three-year contract with Middlesbrough in July 2015, having impressed manager Aitor Karanka and goalkeeper coach Leo Percovich in training. On 31 July, Ripley moved on loan to Scottish Premiership club Motherwell until January 2016, and was given the number one shirt ahead of Dan Twardzik by manager Ian Baraclough. He made his debut the following day, in a 1–0 win against Inverness Caledonian Thistle. Having successfully kept new signing Craig Samson to a place on the bench, Ripley's loan deal was extended until the end of the 2015–16 season in January. Motherwell boss Mark McGhee said that "he's been absolutely terrific for us but I think we have done them [Middlesbrough] a service because we are sending back a better player". He played 40 games during his time at Fir Park.

Ripley was sent out on loan again, agreeing a season-long move to League One club Oldham Athletic on 9 July 2016. He joined the club on the same day as manager Stephen Robinson, who had been the assistant manager to McGhee at Motherwell. Speaking in September, Ripley said he was "loving every minute" of his time at Boundary Park. He went on to feature 54 times in the 2016–17 season. Ripley equalled Oldham's clean sheet record and won three end-of-season club awards, including Young Player of the Year, leaving manager John Sheridan pessimistic about being able to bring him back again for the following season. He signed a two-year contract extension with Middlesbrough in August 2017, with manager Garry Monk looking to loan him out after signing Darren Randolph from West Ham United.

He moved on loan to Burton Albion on 9 August 2017. He had attracted offers from numerous League One clubs, but wanted to test himself in the Championship. He failed to dislodge Stephen Bywater in goal, and his loan spell was terminated early in January after five appearances. Nigel Clough had said that "Ripley who was brought in to play but Stephen's been so good that we can't leave him out". Having returned from his loan at the Pirelli Stadium prematurely, he departed once again and signed on loan for Bury in January 2018. Bury struggled and were relegated after finishing bottom of League One at the end of the 2017–18 season, with Ripley playing 16 games before manager Ryan Lowe restored Joe Murphy in goal after Murphy recovered from injury for the veteran to try and win himself a new deal.

He moved on loan to League One side Accrington Stanley on 9 August 2018. The loan deal covered the entire 2018–19 season. However, manager John Coleman admitted that there was a break clause in January that was out of Accrington's control. He competed with Jonny Maxted for a first-team place at the Crown Ground. He later said that "it is a great club, I loved my time there... it was a family, community kind of feel". He was allowed to leave Middlesbrough in January, though manager Tony Pulis stressed there was a "massive" sell-on clause and the club retained first option to re-sign the keeper in the future.

=== Preston North End ===
On 9 January 2019, Ripley signed a three-and-a-half-year contract with fellow Championship club Preston North End. Alex Neil stuck with Declan Rudd in goal at first, and then Ripley struggled with knee and ankle problems, but recovered to play the final two games of the 2018–19 season. He was restricted to four cup appearances in the 2019–20 campaign, and made a series of errors in the FA Cup third round defeat to Norwich City at Deepdale. He played four games in the 2020–21 season, but failed to make the bench under interim manager Frankie McAvoy.

He moved on an emergency loan to League Two team Salford City on 16 October 2021, and kept a clean-sheet on his debut the same day, a 2–0 win over Hartlepool United at Moor Lane. The deal was extended on a week-by-week basis as Tom King remained injured, with Ripley keeping four clean sheets in nine games for Gary Bowyer's Ammies until he returned to Preston on 29 November. Ripley was not in Preston's EFL squad until manager Ryan Lowe needed cover for Daniel Iversen in January whilst Rudd recovered from knee surgery. Ripley was released by the club at the end of the 2021–22 season, having conceded 22 goals in ten appearances during his three and a half years with PNE.

=== Morecambe ===
On 27 June 2022, Ripley signed a one-year deal with League One club Morecambe to begin on 1 July. Manager Derek Adams named him as club captain, though Donald Love would serve as matchday skipper; Adams said that "he will provide stern competition to Adam Smith and Andre da Silva Mendes". On 1 November, Ripley saved two penalties as his side earned a 1–1 draw with Derby County at the Mazuma Stadium, also making crucial saves in Morecambe's further two matches as he won the EFL League One Player of the Month award. After being named Morecambe's Player of the Year, he was released following the club's relegation at the end of the 2022–23 season.

=== Port Vale ===
On 22 June 2023, Ripley signed a two-year contract with League One side Port Vale to begin on 1 July. He said that "the conversations with [manager] Andy Crosby and [director of football] David Flitcroft about where the club is heading and wants to go made it something that I wanted to be a part of". He saved a penalty from Andy Carroll on his home league debut for the Valiants, a 1–0 win over Reading at Vale Park on 12 August, and was named on the EFL League One Team of the Week. He was again named on the Team of the Week after saving a penalty in a 1–1 draw with Cambridge United on 23 September. In a game on 1 January 2024, Ripley was abused by an opposition Carlisle United fan, being told to "go hang yourself". Carlisle United apologised and said they would try and identify the culprit, and subsequently banned four children. He was instructed to distribute the ball more directly towards the end of the 2023–24 season by new manager Darren Moore and remained a consistent performer despite the club's relegation.

On 1 October 2024, he conceded an equalising goal to Colchester United after making an error, though was praised by Moore for recovering mentally to keep a clean sheet at Notts County four days later. He followed this up with key saves in wins over Fleetwood Town and AFC Wimbledon. He was nominated for October's EFL League Two Player of the Month award. He was named in the EFL Team of the Week after keeping a clean sheet at Bromley on 14 December, having made five saves and prevented 1.83 expected goals. However, he was dropped for Ben Amos at the end of the month following a poor run of form, thus ending a run of 69 consecutive league starts. He entered a period of parental leave shortly afterwards and Moore signed Nathan Broome on loan as cover. Ripley kept 25 clean sheets in 79 appearances throughout his time at Port Vale before choosing to leave the club to find first-team football.

=== Swindon Town ===
On 3 February 2025, Ripley joined League Two side Swindon Town for an undisclosed fee on a contract to run until the end of the 2024–25 season. Manager Ian Holloway had shared starting duties between Jack Bycroft and Daniel Barden before Ripley arrived at the County Ground. He impressed at the club and after discussing moving his family closer from Preston to Swindon he was offered a new contract at the end of the season. On 6 June, he signed a new two-year deal, having become a popular player with supporters.

He called for patience from supporters in February 2026 as he said Swindon's new team needed time to gel. By April, he was described as the most important player in the team due to his distribution skills. He was an ever-present in the league throughout the 2025–26 campaign, which ended with Swindon outside of the play-off places. He was named as Junior Reds Player of the Season, SAS Travel Player of the Season, and Disabled Supporters Association Player of the Season.

On 3 October 2026, he made four close range saves in a 1–0 defeat at Rochdale, earning himself a place on the EFL Team of the Week.

== International career ==
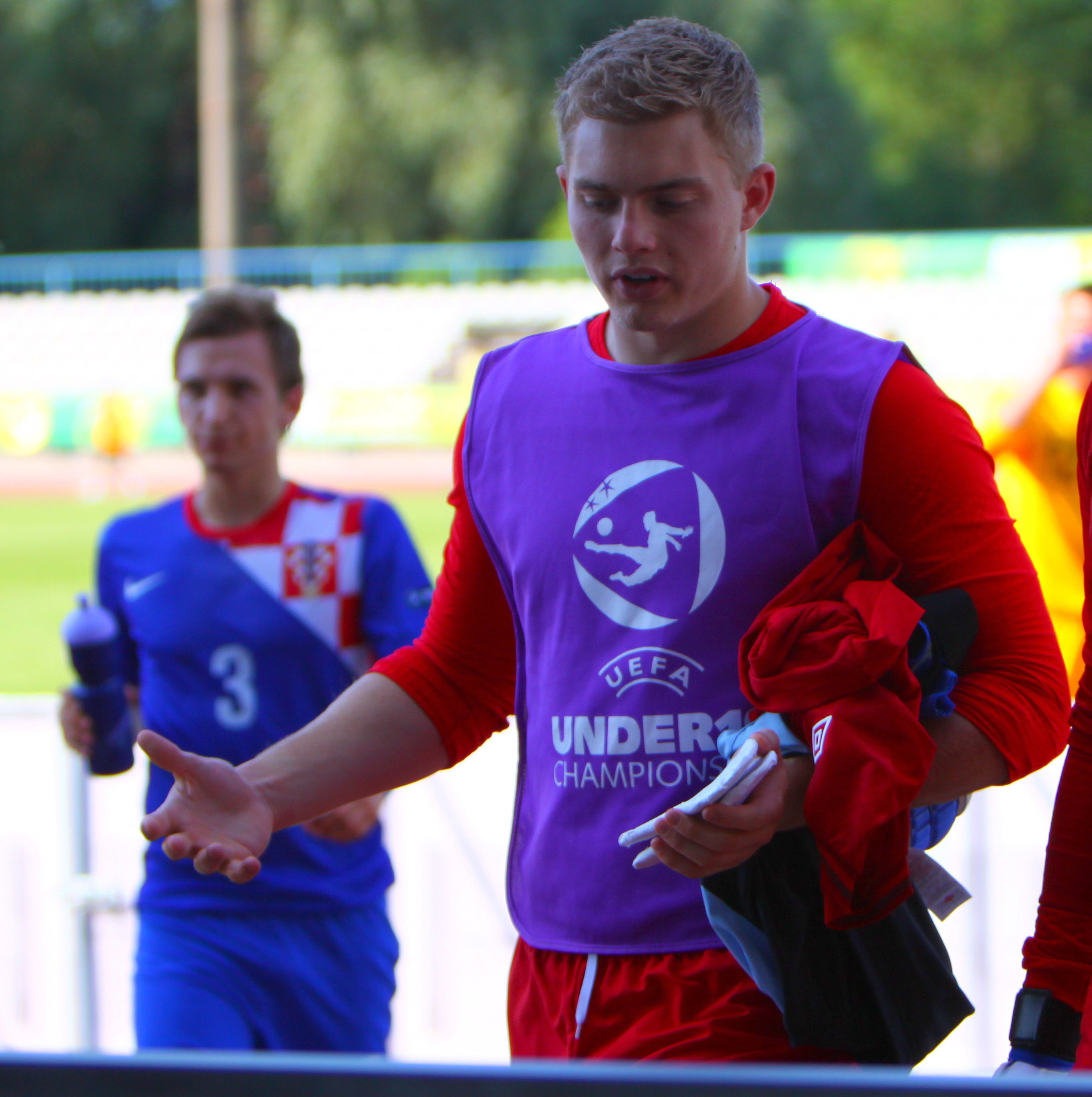
Ripley with England U19 in 2012

On 7 October 2011, Ripley made his debut for the England U19s in a 1–0 win against Portugal during the Limoges Tournament in France. Two days later, he replaced Jamal Blackman in a 3–1 win over Ukraine as England won the tournament. Ripley made two further appearances before being named by Noel Blake in the squad for the 2012 UEFA European Under-19 Championship in Estonia. He didn't feature in the tournament as England reached the semi-finals.

On 28 May 2013, he was named in manager Peter Taylor's 21-man squad for the 2013 FIFA U-20 World Cup. He made his debut on 16 June in a 3–0 win in a warm-up game against Uruguay.

== Style of play ==
Ripley is an all-round goalkeeper who likes to come out and collect crosses. He is comfortable on the ball and can join in the build-up play at the back.

== Personal life ==
Ripley stated his intention to open a coffee shop named Mini Dunes in Preston, Lancashire in 2025.

== Career statistics ==
As of match played 21 November 2026

Appearances and goals by club, season and competition
Club	Season	League			National cup (Note: Includes FA Cup, Scottish Cup Svenska Cupen)		League cup (Note: Includes EFL Cup)		Other		Total	
Club	Season	Division	Apps	Goals	Apps	Goals	Apps	Goals	Apps	Goals	Apps	Goals
Middlesbrough	2010–11	Championship	1	0	0	0	0	0	—		1	0
Middlesbrough	2011–12	Championship	1	0	1	0	0	0	—		2	0
Middlesbrough	2012–13	Championship	0	0	0	0	0	0	—		0	0
Middlesbrough	2013–14	Championship	0	0	0	0	0	0	—		0	0
Middlesbrough	2014–15	Championship	0	0	0	0	0	0	—		0	0
Middlesbrough	2015–16	Championship	0	0	0	0	0	0	—		0	0
Middlesbrough	2016–17	Premier League	0	0	0	0	0	0	—		0	0
Middlesbrough	2017–18	Championship	0	0	0	0	0	0	—		0	0
Middlesbrough	2018–19	Championship	0	0	0	0	0	0	—		0	0
Middlesbrough	Total		2	0	1	0	0	0	0	0	3	0
Oxford United (loan)	2011–12	League Two	1	0	—		—		—		1	0
Bradford City (loan)	2013–14	League One	0	0	0	0	0	0	1 (Note: Appearance(s) in the Football League Trophy/EFL Trophy.)	0	1	0
Östersund (loan)	2014	Superettan	14	0	1	0	—		0	0	15	0
Motherwell (loan)	2015–16	Scottish Premiership	36	0	2	0	2	0	—		40	0
Oldham Athletic (loan)	2016–17	League One	46	0	2	0	2	0	4	0	54	0
Burton Albion (loan)	2017–18	Championship	2	0	0	0	3	0	—		5	0
Bury (loan)	2017–18	League One	15	0	—		—		1	0	16	0
Accrington Stanley (loan)	2018–19	League One	21	0	3	0	0	0	0	0	24	0
Preston North End	2018–19	Championship	2	0	—		—		—		2	0
Preston North End	2019–20	Championship	0	0	1	0	3	0	—		4	0
Preston North End	2020–21	Championship	1	0	1	0	2	0	—		4	0
Preston North End	2021–22	Championship	0	0	0	0	0	0	—		0	0
Preston North End	Total		3	0	2	0	5	0	0	0	10	0
Salford City (loan)	2021–22	League Two	7	0	1	0	—		1	0	9	0
Morecambe	2022–23	League One	45	0	1	0	3	0	0	0	49	0
Port Vale	2023–24	League One	46	0	4	0	5	0	0	0	55	0
Port Vale	2024–25	League Two	23	0	1	0	0	0	0	0	24	0
Port Vale	Total		69	0	5	0	5	0	0	0	79	0
Swindon Town	2024–25	League Two	14	0	—		—		—		14	0
Swindon Town	2025–26	League Two	46	0	3	0	1	0	0	0	50	0
Swindon Town	2026–27	League Two	16	0	1	0	1	0	0	0	18	0
Swindon Town	Total		76	0	4	0	2	0	0	0	82	0
Career total			337	0	22	0	22	0	7	0	388	0

== Honours ==
Individual

- EFL League One Player of the Month: November 2022
- Morecambe Player of the Year: 2022–23
