= Aaron Drinan =

Irish footballer (born 1998)

Personal information
- Full name: Aaron John Drinan
- Date of birth: 6 May 1998 (age 28)
- Place of birth: Cork, Ireland
- Height: 1.82 m (6 ft 0 in)
- Position: Striker

Team information
- Current team: Swindon Town
- Number: 23

Youth career
- 2002–2015: Carrigaline United
- 2015: Cobh Ramblers
- 2015–2017: Cork City

Senior career*
Years	Team	Apps	(Gls)
2017	Waterford	5	(1)
2018–2021	Ipswich Town	22	(1)
2018	→ Sutton United (loan)	18	(0)
2019	→ Waterford (loan)	18	(7)
2019	→ GAIS (loan)	5	(0)
2020	→ Ayr United (loan)	7	(1)
2021–2024	Leyton Orient	85	(15)
2024–	Swindon Town	102	(38)

International career^{‡}
2019	Republic of Ireland U21	7	(0)
- * Club domestic league appearances and goals as of 13:39, 22 November 2026 (UTC) ‡ National team caps and goals as of 08:43, 27 January 2020 (UTC)

Aaron John Drinan (born 6 May 1998) is an Irish professional footballer who plays as a striker for EFL League Two club Swindon Town.

He played youth football for Irish sides Carrigaline United, Cobh Ramblers and Cork City, before joining League of Ireland side Waterford in 2017, making his senior debut in August 2017. He helped Waterford to win the League of Ireland First Division title during his first season in senior football. In January 2018, Drinan signed for English club Ipswich Town. He spent time out on loan at English National League side Sutton United, former club Waterford, Swedish Superettan club GAIS and Scottish side Ayr United between 2018 and 2020. He made his first-team debut for Ipswich in September 2020.

Drinan has won caps for the Republic of Ireland U21 team, making his debut in March 2019.

== Club career ==
=== Early career ===
Drinan began playing football with his local side Carrigaline United at the age of 4, impressing enough to earn a move to Cobh Ramblers, where he would play with their Under-19 side for a short time in early 2015 before moving to their rivals Cork City in the summer of 2015 where he would play until the end of the 2017 season. During his time at Cork's under-19 side, he played alongside Chiedozie Ogbene, Cian Coleman and Conor McCarthy among others.

=== Cork City ===
Drinan won his first title with Cork City Under 19's with a win over Limerick at Markets Field on 15 December 2015. His first appearance for the first-team came on 9 June 2016, playing 85 minutes of a friendly against Fulham. He was part of the side to the Enda McGuill Cup in September 2016, beating St Patrick's Athletic in the final and qualifying for the UEFA Youth League in the process. Drinan impressed in the UEFA Youth League, scoring the winner in a 1–0 win on aggregate against HJK Helsinki of Finland as well as scoring an equaliser against Italian giants AS Roma. His first involvement in a first-team squad for a league game was on 23 June 2017 when he was an unused substitute in a 2–1 win over Derry City at Maginn Park.

=== Waterford ===
Drinan dropped down a division to sign for Waterford of the League of Ireland First Division in July 2017, making his competitive debut in senior football away to Cabinteely on 4 August 2017. He scored the first goal of his senior career on 1 September 2017, scoring in a 1–1 draw with Shelbourne at the RSC. Drinan finished up the season with 5 appearances and 1 goal to his name as Waterford won the League of Ireland First Division, resulting in his first taste of silverware at senior level.

=== Ipswich Town ===
Drinan began training with English EFL Championship side Ipswich Town in October 2017 and was announced as a new signing by manager Mick McCarthy on 4 January 2018, signing a three-and-a-half-year contract, with the option of an additional one-year extension for a fee reported to be £90,000. He was an unused substitute in 4 Championship games and 1 FA Cup game for Ipswich during the 2017–18 season but failed to make his first-team debut as his side finished in 12th place. He impressed his teammates in training during the early months of his time at Ipswich, earning him the nickname "Murph", after former Ipswich and Republic of Ireland striker Daryl Murphy.

==== Loans away ====
He joined National League side Sutton United on 1 August 2018. He made his debut for Sutton United three days later in a 2–2 draw with Harrogate Town. His first goal came on 20 October 2018 when he scored the winner against Wealdstone in the FA Cup. He returned to Ipswich in November 2018.

On 15 February 2019, it as announced that Drinan had signed for his old club Waterford on loan until the summer. His loan was a huge success, scoring 7 goals in 18 league games. His form had Waterford looking to extend the loan, but this proved to be unsuccessful, with Ipswich wanting the player to return.

Drinan signed for Swedish Superettan side GAIS on 8 August 2019. He made his debut away to Dalkurd FF on 18 August 2019. He returned to Ipswich Town in November at the end of his loan which saw him make 9 appearances for GAIS.

He signed for Scottish Championship side Ayr United on loan on 17 January 2020. His debut came the next day in a 1–0 Scottish Cup win over Ross County to earn a 5th Round tie with Scottish Premiership side St Johnstone. He scored his first goal for Ayr on 8 February in a 2–1 loss to St Johnstone in a Scottish Cup match. He made 9 appearances during his loan spell with Ayr, scoring twice.

==== Return to Ipswich ====
Drinan featured regularly for Ipswich in the 2020 pre-season, including scoring a brace in a 4–0 friendly win against Colchester United on 18 August. After 2 1/2 years at Ipswich, Drinian made his full senior debut for the club on 5 September 2020 in a 3–0 home win against Bristol Rovers in the EFL Cup at Portman Road, assisting the first goal scored by teammate Freddie Sears. He made his league debut for the club in a 2–0 win against Wigan Athletic on the opening day of the 2020–21 league season, although he had to be withdraw at half-time due to a thigh injury, which would rule him out of action for two months. He scored his first goal for the club on 30 January 2021, in a 1–1 draw with Crewe Alexandra. He made 24 appearances during the 2020–21 season, scoring once. On 10 May 2021, Ipswich announced that they had taken up the option to extend Drinan's contract by an additional year, keeping him under contract until 2022.

=== Leyton Orient ===
On 28 June 2021, Drinan joined Leyton Orient for an undisclosed fee, signing a two-year deal. On 24 July 2022, Drinan signed a new one-year extension to his existing contract.

=== Swindon Town ===
On 1 February 2024 he signed for Swindon Town. He was offered a new contract by Swindon at the end of the 2024–25 season. On 20 June 2025, the club announced he had signed a new two-year deal.

Following a strong start to the 2025–26 season for both player and club, Drinan was named EFL League Two Player of the Month for September 2025 having scored five goals in four matches. He was named League Two Player of the Season at the EFL end of season awards, also being named in the Team of the Season.

He signed a new contract with the club in September 2026.

== International career ==
Drinan received his first call up to the Republic of Ireland U21 national team in February 2019 for a training camp at the FAI National Training Centre. He made his debut for the under-21's in a UEFA European Under-21 Championship qualifier on 24 March 2019, featuring as a second-half substitute in a 3–0 victory over Luxembourg in Dublin. In May 2019, Drinan was called up to the Irish U21s squad for the 2019 Maurice Revello Tournament in Toulon. He featured 4 times for Ireland during the tournament as the Irish U21s finished 4th. He was again included in the Republic of Ireland U21 squad in October 2019 for a European Championships qualifier against Iceland in Reykjavík, featuring as a second-half substitute in as the Republic of Ireland lost 1–0 in the qualifier.

== Career statistics ==
As of match played 21 November 2026

Appearances and goals by club, season and competition
Club	Season	League			National Cup (Note: Includes appearances in FAI Cup, FA Cup, Svenska Cupen and Scottish Cup)		League Cup (Note: Includes appearances in League of Ireland Cup and EFL Cup)		Other		Total	
Club	Season	Division	Apps	Goals	Apps	Goals	Apps	Goals	Apps	Goals	Apps	Goals
Waterford	2017	League of Ireland First Division	5	1	1	0	0	0	—		6	1
Ipswich Town	2017–18	EFL Championship	0	0	0	0	0	0	—		0	0
Ipswich Town	2018–19	EFL Championship	0	0	0	0	0	0	—		0	0
Ipswich Town	2019–20	EFL League One	0	0	0	0	0	0	0	0	0	0
Ipswich Town	2020–21	EFL League One	22	1	0	0	1	0	1 (Note: Appearance(s) in EFL Trophy)	0	24	1
Ipswich Town	Total		22	1	0	0	1	0	1	0	24	1
Sutton United (loan)	2018–19	National League	18	0	3	1	—		1 (Note: Appearance in Scottish Challenge Cup)	0	22	1
Waterford (loan)	2019	League of Ireland Premier Division	18	7	0	0	1	0	—		19	7
GAIS (loan)	2019	Superettan	8	0	1	0	—		—		9	0
Ayr United (loan)	2019–20	Scottish Championship	7	1	2	1	0	0	0	0	9	2
Leyton Orient	2021–22	EFL League Two	40	13	3	2	1	1	0	0	44	16
Leyton Orient	2022–23	EFL League Two	33	2	1	0	0	0	3	1	37	3
Leyton Orient	2023–24	EFL League One	12	0	1	1	0	0	2	0	15	1
Leyton Orient	Total		85	15	5	3	1	1	5	1	96	20
Swindon Town	2023–24	EFL League Two	17	4	0	0	0	0	0	0	17	4
Swindon Town	2024–25	EFL League Two	28	3	2	0	1	0	3	0	34	3
Swindon Town	2025–26	EFL League Two	41	22	3	3	0	0	3	3	47	28
Swindon Town	2026–27	EFL League Two	16	8	1	1	1	0	0	0	18	9
Swindon Town	Total		102	37	6	4	2	0	6	3	116	44
Career total			265	62	18	9	5	1	13	4	301	76

== Honours ==
Waterford United

- League of Ireland First Division: 2017

Leyton Orient

- EFL League Two: 2022–23

Individual

- EFL League Two Player of the Month: September 2025
- EFL League Two Player of the Season: 2025–26
- EFL League Two Team of the Season: 2025–26
- PFA Team of the Year: 2025–26 League Two
- PFA Players' Player of the Year: 2025–26 League Two
