= Billy Kirkman =

English footballer (born 2004)

Personal information
- Full name: Billy Naylor Kirkman
- Date of birth: 26 February 2004 (age 22)
- Place of birth: Blackburn, England
- Position: Left back

Team information
- Current team: Swindon Town
- Number: 34

Youth career
- 2017–2022: The New Saints

Senior career*
Years	Team	Apps	(Gls)
2022–2024	The New Saints	5	(0)
2023	→ Aberystwyth Town (loan)	12	(0)
2023–2024	→ Aberystwyth Town (loan)	26	(1)
2024–	Swindon Town	37	(1)
2024	→ Weston-super-Mare (loan)	11	(0)
- * Club domestic league appearances and goals as of 13:36, 22 November 2026 (UTC)

Billy Naylor Kirkman (born 26 February 2004) is an English professional footballer who plays for Swindon Town, as a left back.

== Career ==
Born in Blackburn, Kirkman began his career at The New Saints at under-13 level, and had two loan spells at Aberystwyth Town, the first in January 2023, and the second in August 2023, which was extended in January 2024.

Kirkman signed for Swindon Town in August 2024, saying he wanted to succeed in English football after his time in Wales. He moved on loan to Weston-super-Mare in September 2024. He was recalled by Swindon in December 2024, scoring on his debut for the club a day later, in the EFL Trophy. He was in competition with George Cox for a first-team place, with Kirkman being described as having made an "impressive start" to his career with the club.

== Career statistics ==
As of match played 21 November 2026

Appearances and goals by club, season and competition
Club	Season	League			National cup (Note: Includes Welsh Cup, FA Cup)		League cup		Other		Total	
Club	Season	Division	Apps	Goals	Apps	Goals	Apps	Goals	Apps	Goals	Apps	Goals
The New Saints	2022–23	Cymru Premier	5	0	0	0	0	0	0	0	5	0
The New Saints	2023–24	Cymru Premier	0	0	0	0	0	0	0	0	0	0
The New Saints	Total		5	0	0	0	0	0	0	0	0	0
Aberystwyth Town (loan)	2022–23	Cymru Premier	12	0	0	0	0	0	0	0	12	0
Aberystwyth Town (loan)	2023–24	Cymru Premier	26	1	0	0	0	0	0	0	26	1
Swindon Town	2024–25	League Two	14	0	0	0	0	0	2 (Note: Appearances in EFL Trophy)	0	16	0
Swindon Town	2025–26	League Two	10	1	2	0	0	0	3	0	15	1
Swindon Town	2026–27	League Two	13	0	0	0	1	0	2	0	16	0
Swindon Town	Total		37	1	2	0	1	0	7	0	47	1
Weston-super-Mare (loan)	2024–25	National League South	11	0	2	0	–		1 (Note: Appearances in FA Trophy)	0	14	0
Career total			91	2	4	0	1	0	8	0	104	2
