= Jake Batty =

English footballer (born 2005)

- Batty v Arsenal (EFL Cup) - 27.10.2026

Personal information
- Full name: Jake Thomas Batty
- Date of birth: 4 May 2005 (age 21)
- Place of birth: Liverpool, England
- Height: 1.76 m (5 ft 9 in)
- Positions: Left-back; left wing-back

Team information
- Current team: Fleetwood Town
- Number: 24

Youth career
- 2017–2022: Blackburn Rovers

Senior career*
Years	Team	Apps	(Gls)
2022–2026	Blackburn Rovers	0	(0)
2024–2025	→ Accrington Stanley (loan)	25	(0)
2026	Swindon Town	17	(0)
2026–	Fleetwood Town	8	(0)

International career
2022	England U17	3	(0)
- * Club domestic league appearances and goals as of 10:23, 16 November 2026 (UTC)

Jake Thomas Batty (born 4 May 2005) is an English professional footballer who plays as a left-back or left wing-back for EFL League Two club Fleetwood Town.

== Club career ==
=== Blackburn Rovers ===
Born in Liverpool, Batty joined Blackburn Rovers in 2017. Having made his debut in a 4–0 EFL Cup win over Hartlepool United in August 2022, he signed his first professional contract with the club in October 2022.

On 1 July 2025, Batty signed a new one year deal at Blackburn Rovers, with an option of a further 12 months

=== Accrington Stanley (loan) ===
On 29 August 2024, Batty joined Accrington Stanley on loan until the end of the season. On 3 May 2025, Batty won numerous awards at the Accrington Stanley 2024–25 end of season awards, including Players' Young Player of the Season and Supporters' Trust Young Player of the Season.

=== Swindon Town ===
On 2 February 2026, Batty joined Swindon Town on a short term deal until the end of the season.

On 7 February 2026 Batty made his competitive debut as a first half substitute in the 3–0 victory over Oldham, wearing the number 26.

On 15 May 2026, it was confirmed that Batty would not be extending his stay at Swindon beyond the 2025–26 season, therefore becoming a free agent.

=== Fleetwood Town ===
On 28 July 2026, Batty joined League Two club Fleetwood Town on a two-year deal. Batty was given the squad number 24.

On 27 October 2026, Batty played the full 90 minutes and received the home sponsor's Man of the Match in one of the EFL Cups greatest ever upsets, when Fleetwood knocked out English Champions Arsenal, eventually winning 5-3 on penalties after drawing 1-1 in regulation time

== International career ==
Batty has represented England at under-17 level.

== Career statistics ==
As of match played 14 November 2026

Appearances and goals by club, season and competition
Club	Season	League			FA Cup		EFL Cup		Other		Total	
Club	Season	Division	Apps	Goals	Apps	Goals	Apps	Goals	Apps	Goals	Apps	Goals
Blackburn Rovers	2022–23	Championship	0	0	0	0	1	0	0	0	1	0
Blackburn Rovers	2023–24	Championship	0	0	0	0	1	0	0	0	1	0
Blackburn Rovers	2024–25	Championship	0	0	0	0	0	0	0	0	0	0
Blackburn Rovers	2025–26	Championship	0	0	0	0	0	0	0	0	0	0
Blackburn Rovers	Total		0	0	0	0	2	0	0	0	2	0
Accrington Stanley (loan)	2024–25	League Two	25	0	1	0	0	0	3	0	29	0
Swindon Town	2025–26	League Two	17	0	0	0	0	0	0	0	17	0
Fleetwood Town	2026–27	League Two	8	0	1	0	1	0	1	0	11	0
Career total			50	0	2	0	3	0	4	0	59	0
