= Harrison Gray (footballer) =

English footballer (born 2007)

Personal information
- Full name: Harrison Steven Gray
- Date of birth: 25 September 2007 (age 19)
- Place of birth: Witney, England
- Height: 5 ft 9 in (1.75 m)
- Position: Midfielder

Team information
- Current team: Coventry City

Youth career
- –2023: Swindon Town

Senior career*
Years	Team	Apps	(Gls)
2023–2026	Swindon Town	1	(0)
2025	→ Melksham Town (loan)	8	(1)
2025–2026	→ Weymouth (loan)	7	(0)
2026	→ Real Bedford (loan)	6	(1)
2026–	Coventry City	0	(0)
- * Club domestic league appearances and goals as of 20:06, 10 October 2023 (UTC)

Harrison Gray (born 2007) is an English professional footballer who plays as a midfielder.

== Career ==
Gray started his career with Swindon Town and made his debut on 10 October 2023, during a 5–0 away defeat to Reading in the EFL Trophy group stage.

In July 2026, Gray signed for Coventry City.

== Career statistics ==
As of match played 25 May 2026

Appearances and goals by club, season and competition
Club	Season	League			FA Cup		League Cup		Other		Total	
Club	Season	Division	Apps	Goals	Apps	Goals	Apps	Goals	Apps	Goals	Apps	Goals
Swindon Town	2023–24	League Two	0	0	1	0	0	0	1 (Note: Appearance in the EFL Trophy)	0	2	0
Swindon Town	2024–25	League Two	0	0	0	0	0	0	0	0	0	0
Swindon Town	2025–26	League Two	1	0	0	0	0	0	1	0	2	0
Total			1	0	1	0	0	0	2	0	4	0
Melksham Town (loan)	2025–26	Southern League Division One South	8	1	0	0	0	0	0	0	8	1
Weymouth (loan)	2025–26	Southern League Premier Division South	7	0	0	0	0	0	0	0	7	0
Real Bedford (loan)	2025–26	Southern League Premier Division Central	6	1	0	0	0	0	0	0	6	1
Career total			22	2	1	0	0	0	2	0	25	2
