= James Debayo =

English footballer (born 2005)

Personal information
- Full name: James Boluwatife Debayo
- Date of birth: 11 July 2005 (age 21)
- Place of birth: Hillingdon, London, England
- Height: 6 ft 2 in (1.89 m)
- Position: Centre-back

Team information
- Current team: Swindon Town (on loan from Hull City)
- Number: 18

Youth career
- –2021: Watford
- 2021–2025: Leeds United

Senior career*
Years	Team	Apps	(Gls)
2022–2025	Leeds United	1	(0)
2026–	Hull City	0	(0)
2026–	→ Swindon Town (loan)	2	(0)

International career
2022	England U17	2	(0)
2023	England U18	6	(0)
- * Club domestic league appearances and goals as of 17:00, 5 September 2026 (UTC)

James Boluwatife Debayo (born 11 July 2005) is an English professional footballer who plays as a centre-back for EFL League Two club Swindon Town on loan from Premier League club Hull City.

== Club career ==
A product of the Watford academy, Debayo signed a two year scholarship deal with Leeds United in July 2021. He made his English Football League debut for Leeds on 24 November 2024 in the 4–3 EFL Championship away win against Swansea City as an 89th-minute substitute for Dan James. He was offered a new contract by the club in May 2025, but ultimately left the club that summer.

In January 2026 Debayo signed for Hull City.

On 2 July 2026, Debayo joined Swindon Town on a season-long loan spell.

== International career ==
Born in England, Debayo is of Nigerian descent. In June 2022 he started for England U17 in a defeat against USA. The following year saw him represent England U18.

== Career statistics ==
As of match played 24 November 2024

Appearances and goals by club, season and competition
Club	Season	League			FA Cup		EFL Cup		Other		Total	
Club	Season	Division	Apps	Goals	Apps	Goals	Apps	Goals	Apps	Goals	Apps	Goals
Leeds United	2024–25	Championship	1	0	1	0	0	0	—		2	0
Career total			1	0	1	0	0	0	0	0	2	0
