= Jake Tabor =

English footballer (born 2003)

Personal information
- Full name: Jake Tom Tabor
- Date of birth: 25 August 2003 (age 23)
- Position: Striker

Team information
- Current team: Hemel Hempstead Town

Senior career*
Years	Team	Apps	(Gls)
2019–2020	Sarratt	17	(0)
2020–2021	Berkhamsted Comrades	1	(1)
2021	Berkhamsted	5	(1)
2021	→ Crawley Green (dual registration)	7	(3)
2021–2022	Oxhey Jets	19	(8)
2022	Harpenden Town	5	(2)
2022–2023	Rayners Lane	20	(28)
2022–2023	→ Northwood (dual registration)	16	(2)
2023	→ Leighton Town (dual registration)	6	(2)
2023–2025	Amersham Town	72	(107)
2025–2026	Swindon Town	9	(0)
2025	→ Bath City (loan)	8	(1)
2026	→ Eastleigh (loan)	9	(2)
2026–	Hemel Hempstead Town	2	(0)
- * Club domestic league appearances and goals as of 10:04, 17 August 2026 (UTC)

Jake Tom Tabor (born 25 August 2003) is an English professional footballer who plays as a striker for National League South club Hemel Hempstead Town.

== Career ==
=== Early career ===
Tabor spent his early career with Sarratt, Berkhamsted Comrades, Berkhamsted, Crawley Green and Oxhey Jets. After playing for Harpenden Town, Tabor joined Rayners Lane, before signing on a dual registration for Northwood in October 2022. He then played for Leighton Town, also on a dual registration. He later played for Amersham Town, scoring 66 goals for Amersham in the 2023–24 season.

=== Swindon Town ===
Following a trial with the club, which Swindon manager Ian Holloway described as the best he had ever seen, Tabor signed for Swindon Town in June 2025, signing his first professional contract with the club. He had interest from other clubs prior to signing for Swindon. Tabor's adaptation to professional training was praised by Swindon manager Ian Holloway, and a large number of bets were placed on Tabor to be the league's top scorer.

On 13 September 2025, Tabor joined National League South club Bath City on a one-month loan deal. The loan was extended in October 2025 for another month, before he was recalled by Swindon in November due to injuries at the parent club. His performances on loan at Bath were praised by Holloway. On 30 January 2026, it was announced that he would return to Bath City on loan for the remainder of the season, however due to an EFL ruling regarding short-term loan regulations, his return to Bath was not permitted, and instead, on 6 February 2026, Tabor joined National League side Eastleigh on loan until the end of the season. His Eastleigh debut came on 7 February 2026 during the 2–2 draw against Wealdstone, and he scored his first goal for the club on 14 February 2026 during the 2–2 draw against Boreham Wood..

=== Hemel Hempstead Town ===
On 24 July 2026, Tabor signed for National League South club Hemel Hempstead Town for an undisclosed fee

== Playing style ==
Known as a prolific goalscorer at non-league level, Tabor has been compared to Jamie Vardy.

== Career statistics ==
As of match played 28 March 2026

Appearances and goals by club, season and competition
Club	Season	League			FA Cup		EFL Cup		Other		Total	
Club	Season	Division	Apps	Goals	Apps	Goals	Apps	Goals	Apps	Goals	Apps	Goals
Sarratt	2019–20	Spartan South Midlands League Division Two	14	0	—		—		3 (Note: Two appearances in the Anagram Records Trophy; one in the Spartan South Midlands League Division Two Cup)	0	17	0
Sarratt	2020–21	Spartan South Midlands League Division Two	3	0	—		—		0	0	3	0
Sarratt	Total		17	0	0	0	0	0	3	0	20	0
Berkhamsted Comrades	2020–21	Spartan South Midlands League Division Two	1	1	—		—		0	0	1	1
Berkhamsted	2021–22	Southern League Division One Central	5	1	0	0	—		4 (Note: Two appearances and one goal in the Southern League Cup; two appearances in the FA Trophy)	1	9	2
Crawley Green (dual-reg.)	2021–22	Spartan South Midlands League Premier Division	7	3	—		—		—		7	3
Oxhey Jets	2021–22	Spartan South Midlands League Premier Division	19	8	—		—		3 (Note: One appearances and two goals in the Gladwish Challenge Trophy; two appearances in the Spartan South Midlands League Premier Division Cup)	2	22	10
Harpenden Town	2022–23	Spartan South Midlands League Premier Division	5	2	2	1	—		1 (Note: Appearance in the Gladwish Challenge Trophy)	0	8	3
Rayners Lane	2022–23	Combined Counties League Division One	20	28	—		—		1 (Note: Appearance in the Combined Counties League Challenge Trophy)	2	21	30
Northwood (dual-reg.)	2022–23	Isthmian League South Central Division	16	2	—		—		1 (Note: Appearance in the Alan Turvey Trophy)	0	17	2
Leighton Town (dual-reg.)	2022–23	Spartan South Midlands League Premier Division	6	2	—		—		1 (Note: Appearance in the Spartan South Midlands Football League Premier Division Cup)	0	7	2
Amersham Town	2023–24	Combined Counties League Division One	37	65	—		—		6 (Note: Three appearances and eight goals in the FA Vase; two appearances and one goal in the Combined Counties League Challenge Trophy; one appearance and two goals in the Combined Counties League Division One Cup)	11	43	76
Amersham Town	2024–25	Combined Counties League Premier Division North	35	42	5	4	—		3 (Note: One appearance in the FA Vase; one in the Combined Counties League Challenge Trophy; one in the Combined Counties League Premier Division North play-offs)	0	43	47
Amersham Town	Total		72	107	5	4	—		9	11	86	122
Swindon Town	2025–26	League Two	9	0	2	0	1	0	2 (Note: Appearances in the EFL Trophy)	0	14	0
Bath City (loan)	2025–26	National League South	8	1	—		—		0	0	8	1
Eastleigh (loan)	2025–26	National League	9	2	—		—		0	0	9	2
Career total			196	158	9	5	1	0	25	16	229	178
