= Clem Morfuni =

Australian businessman

Clemente Giovanni Bruno Morfuni is an Australian businessman who is the owner of Swindon Town.

== Career ==
In 2021, Morfuni became the majority owner of English side Swindon Town.

In August 2023, Morfuni was accused by the Swindon Advertiser of transferring shares of the football club to two other individuals. CEO Rob Angus read out a prepared statement at the club's fan forum stating: "We were made aware this morning via Companies House that there was a confirmation statement update on the ownership structure of Axis Football Investments Limited of Swindon Town Football Club."

Morfuni later admitted that he did not own 100% of the club and had transferred shares as part of an agreement with regards to the club's debt with previous owner Lee Power. In September 2023, the EFL opened an investigation into issues surrounding the club's ownership.

In November 2023, Morfuni issued a statement rejecting some elements of a report by sports journalist Ryan Whelan. The report claimed that the club had been placed up for sale and some staff members hadn't been paid on time. Morfuni admitted that revenue wasn't enough to cover costs, so a cash injection was needed, as detailed in the report by Whelan. It was also stated by Morfuni that "entertaining" of offers to purchase the club does not mean it is for sale. The Swindon Town Supporters Trust issued a statement claiming they had received similar information to Whelan but had been unable to verify it. They called on Morfuni to allow them access to financial records which had been promised at a previous meeting. An interview was then published in Forbes Australia reiterating what was said in the statement whilst claiming Whelan was "taking a swipe" at him whilst recalling a conversation with Look Sports Media over the story. This conversation has been refuted by the publication and journalist.

== See also ==
- List of owners of English football clubs
