= Filozofe Mabete =

Professional footballer (born 2005)

Personal information
- Date of birth: 14 March 2005 (age 21)
- Place of birth: Enfield, England
- Height: 1.84 m (6 ft 0 in)
- Position: Defender

Team information
- Current team: Forest Green Rovers (on loan from Swindon Town)

Youth career
- 2017–2025: Wolverhampton Wanderers

Senior career*
Years	Team	Apps	(Gls)
2025–	Swindon Town	26	(1)
2026–	→ Forest Green Rovers (loan)	3	(1)

International career^{‡}
2024–	DR Congo U20		
- * Club domestic league appearances and goals as of 18:03, 24 August 2026 (UTC) ‡ National team caps and goals as of 00:12, 30 October 2026 (UTC)

Filozofe Mabete (born 14 March 2005) is a professional footballer who plays as a defender for Forest Green Rovers, on loan from Swindon Town. Born in England, he is a youth international for the DR Congo.

== Club career ==
Born in Enfield, Mabete began his career with Wolverhampton Wanderers at the age of 12, turning professional in April 2023. He signed for Swindon Town in June 2025. Following the move, Mabete was praised by his former club. After making a number of appearances at the start of the season, he was rested by the club.

In August 2026 he signed on loan for Forest Green Rovers.

== International career ==
He made his debut for DR Congo U20 in 2024.

In March 2026 he was called-up by the DR Congo U23 team.
