= Fletcher Holman =

English footballer

Personal information
- Full name: Fletcher William Holman
- Date of birth: 12 October 2004 (age 22)
- Place of birth: England
- Position: Forward

Team information
- Current team: Swindon Town
- Number: 11

Youth career
- Brighton & Hove Albion
- Eastbourne Borough

Senior career*
Years	Team	Apps	(Gls)
2021–2022	Eastbourne Town	14	(0)
2022–2024	Eastbourne Borough	21	(5)
2022–2023	→ Eastbourne Town (loan)	31	(13)
2024–2026	Wolverhampton Wanderers	0	(0)
2025	→ Solihull Moors (loan)	20	(3)
2026–	Swindon Town	19	(5)
- * Club domestic league appearances and goals as of 22:45, 16 April 2026 (UTC)

Fletcher William Holman (born 12 October 2004) is an English professional footballer who plays as a forward for EFL League Two club Swindon Town.

== Early life ==
Holman attended Bexhill College in East Sussex.

== Career ==
Holman was released by Brighton and Hove Albion at the age of 14 years-old, prior to signing for Eastbourne Borough.

=== Eastbourne Town ===
Holman signed to Eastbourne Town as a 16 year old. Playing in the Southern Combination Football League, level 9 in the English football league system. Fletcher made his debut as a substitute against Hassocks. Fletcher also appeared in both the under-18 and under-23 teams.

=== Eastbourne Borough ===
Whilst part of the Eastbourne Borough under-18 side, he had dual-registration with Eastbourne Town for whom he was awarded the young player of the season honour for 2022-23. He also made his debut for the senior Eastbourne Borough team during the 2022-23 season aged 18 years-old, and signed a full-time contract with the club in the summer of 2023.

He scored his first league goal for Eastbourne Borough away against Havant and Waterlooville in September 2023. The following month, his goal tally for Eastbourne Borough was boosted as he scored five goals in a single game in the Sussex Senior Cup against Billingshurst. After scoring five league goals in the National League South for the season, and ten goals in all competitions, he signed for Premier League side Wolverhampton Wanderers in January 2024.

=== Wolverhampton Wanderers ===
On 16 March 2024, he was included in the Wolves first-team match-day squad for the first time, in their FA Cup quarter-final match against Coventry City. On 20 April 2024, he was included in the Wolves first-team Premier League match-day squad for the first time, for their league match against Arsenal.

=== Solihull Moors ===
On 9 January 2025, Holman joined Solihull Moors on loan until the end of the season. He scored three goals in 21 appearances for the National League club.

=== Swindon Town ===
On 14 January 2026, Holman joined Swindon Town, signing a contract that runs until 2027. Making his debut in a game against Salford City as substitute, he provided an assist and was denied a goal. Fletcher scored his first goal in his first start a week later against Bromley.

== Career statistics ==
As of 16 April 2026

Appearances and goals by club, season and competition
Club	Season	League			FA Cup		League Cup		Other		Total	
Club	Season	Division	Apps	Goals	Apps	Goals	Apps	Goals	Apps	Goals	Apps	Goals
Eastbourne Town	2021–22	Southern Combination Premier Division	14	0	0	0	—		6	1 (Note: Two appearances and one goal in Sussex Senior Cup, three appearances in Sussex RUR Cup, one appearance in Peter Bentley League Cup)	20	1
Eastbourne Town	Total		14	0	0	0	0	0	6	1	20	1
Eastbourne Borough	2022–23	National League South	4	0	0	0	—		0	0	4	0
Eastbourne Borough	2023–24	National League South	17	5	0	0	—		2	5 (Note: Two appearances and five goals in Sussex Senior Cup and one appearance in FA Trophy)	19	10
Eastbourne Borough	Total		21	5	0	0	0	0	2	5	23	10
Eastbourne Town (loan)	2022–23	Southern Combination Premier Division	31	13	3	0	—		6	4 (Note: Four appearances and four goals in FA Vase, one appearance in Sussex RUR Cup, one appearance in Peter Bentley League Cup)	40	17
Wolverhampton Wanderers U21	2024–25	—			—		—		3 (Note: Appearance(s) in EFL Trophy)	1	3	1
Wolverhampton Wanderers U21	2025–26	—			—		—		3	1	3	1
Wolverhampton Wanderers U21	Total		31	13	3	0	0	0	12	6	46	19
Solihull Moors (loan)	2024–25	National League	20	3	0	0	0	0	0	0	20	3
Swindon Town	2025–26	EFL League Two	19	5	0	0	0	0	0	0	19	5
Swindon Town	Total		39	8	0	0	0	0	0	0	39	8
Career total			105	27	4	0	0	0	20	12	128	39

== Honours ==
Individual

- Eastbourne Town Young player of the Year: 2022–23
