= Swindon Town F.C. Reserves and Academy =

Swindon Town
- Full name: Swindon Town Football Club
- Nickname: The Robins
- Founded: 1879
- Ground: County Ground, Swindon
- Capacity: 15,728
- Chairman: (Australia) Clem Morfuni
- Manager: (England) David Farrell

The Swindon Town reserve team previously played in the Totesport.com Combination League. They also participate in the Wiltshire Premier Shield each season. The Swindon Town Development side play their home games at The County Ground, Swindon. In previous seasons the team has also played at Hunts Copse, the home of Swindon Supermarine.

== Youth Team ==
As of 23 August 2023.

Note: Flags indicate national team as defined under FIFA eligibility rules; some limited exceptions apply. Players may hold more than one non-FIFA nationality.

No.	Pos.	Nation	Player
36	DF	ENG	Sonny Hart
38	FW	ENG	Abu Kanu
40	DF	ENG	Harley Hunt
41	FW	ENG	Miles Obodo
42	MF	ENG	Josh Keyes
45	DF	ENG	Finn Adams
—	GK	ENG	Redman Evans
—	DF	ENG	Harry Chard
—	DF	ENG	Harvey Fox

No.	Pos.	Nation	Player
—	DF	ENG	Antony McCormick
—	DF	ENG	Archie Milne
—	DF	ENG	Finlay Skittrall
—	DF	ENG	Finlay Tombs
—	MF	ENG	Conor Britchford-Stanley
—	MF	ENG	Dani Gonzalez-Birchall
—	MF	ENG	Fletcher Hubbard
—	MF	ENG	Joel McGregor
—	MF	ENG	Alistair Stewart
—	FW	ENG	George Alston

== Honours ==
Swindon Town's Youth Team were FA Youth Cup finalists in 1964, where they were beaten over two legs by a Manchester United side containing George Best. The team did not appear in the final stages of the competition again until 2004 where they lost 3–0 to Chesterfield in the Quarter-final.

Managed by Paul Bodin, the Youth team reached the Quarter-finals of the FA Youth Cup again in 2007 before being knocked out of the competition by Newcastle.

During the 2000s Swindon Town's juniors have enjoyed a degree of success at the Milk Cup tournament.

- Player of the Tournament Award - Leigh Mills (2003)
- Adidas Golden Boot Award - Lukas Jutkiewicz (2004)
- Tayto Most Sporting Team Award - Winners (2005)
- Northern Ireland Tourist Board Trophy - Winners (2006)
- Northern Ireland Milk Cup - Winners (2006)
- B.T. Northern Ireland Trophy - Winners (2007)

== Achievements (Reserves & Youth Combined) ==
Cup Honours

- Wiltshire Premier Shield - Winners 1927, 1928, 1929, 1930, 1931, 1932, 1933, 1948, 1949, 1951, 1952, 1953, 1954, 1955, 1956, 1958, 1959, 1972, 1974, 1975, 1976, 1977, 1980, 1988, 1990, 1991, 1992, 2010
- Puma Youth Alliance Cup - Winners 2005
- Milk Cup - Winners of the Junior section 2006
- Milk Cup - Winners of the B.T. Northern Ireland Trophy 2007
- Football League Youth Alliance - Winners of South West 2008–09, 2009–10, 2010-11
