= 2024–25 Swindon Town F.C. season =

146th season in existence of Swindon Town FC

Swindon Town
2024–25 season
- Owner: Clem Morfuni
- Chairman: Clem Morfuni
- Manager: Mark Kennedy (until 25 October); Ian Holloway (from 25 October)
- Stadium: County Ground
- League Two: 12th
- FA Cup: Second round (eliminated by Accrington Stanley)
- EFL Cup: First round (eliminated by Crawley Town)
- EFL Trophy: Round of 16 (eliminated by Birmingham City)
- Top goalscorer: League: Harry Smith (15); All: Harry Smith (17)
- Highest home attendance: 9,503 vs. MK Dons
- Lowest home attendance: 1,306 vs. Bristol Rovers
- Biggest win: 5-1 vs. Carlisle United (A)
- Biggest defeat: 0-4 vs. Colchester United (A)
Home colours	Away colours

The 2024–25 season is the 146th season in the history of Swindon Town Football Club and their fourth consecutive season in League Two. In addition to the domestic league, the club would also participate in the FA Cup, the EFL Cup, and the EFL Trophy.

== Transfers ==
=== In ===
Date	Pos.	Player	From	Fee	Ref.
14 June 2024 (Note: The transfer was announced on 31 May, and would become official on June 14 once the transfer window re-opened)	CM	Ollie Clarke (ENG)	Mansfield Town (ENG)	Undisclosed	
1 July 2024 (Note: The transfer was announced on 20 June, and would become official on July 1 once his Newport County contract expired)	CB	Ryan Delaney (IRL)	Newport County (WAL)	Free	
1 July 2024 (Note: The transfer was announced on 12 June, and would become official on July 1 once his Accrington Stanley contract expired)	LB	Rosaire Longelo (ENG)	Accrington Stanley (ENG)	Free	
1 July 2024 (Note: The transfer was announced on 27 June, and would become official on July 1 once his Sutton United contract expired)	CF	Harry Smith (ENG)	Sutton United (ENG)	Free	
1 July 2024 (Note: The transfer was announced on 10 June, and would become official on July 1 once his Shrewsbury Town contract expired)	RB	Tunmise Sobowale (IRL)	Shrewsbury Town (ENG)	Free	
1 July 2024 (Note: The transfer was announced on 25 June, and would become official on July 1 once his Crawley Town contract expired)	CB	Will Wright (ENG)	Crawley Town (ENG)	Free	
10 July 2024	CB	Grant Hall (ENG)	Rotherham United (ENG)	Free	
10 July 2024	CM	Dylan Mitchell (ENG)	Aston Villa (ENG)	Free	
5 August 2024	RB	Jeff King (ENG)	Chesterfield (ENG)	Free	
9 August 2024	LB	Billy Kirkman (ENG)	The New Saints (WAL)	Free	
29 August 2024	CM	Gavin Kilkenny (IRL)	Bournemouth (ENG)	Undisclosed	
30 August 2024	CF	Danny Butterworth (ENG)	Carlisle United (ENG)	Undisclosed	
30 August 2024	LB	George Cox (ENG)	Volendam (NED)	Free	
3 February 2025	GK	Connor Ripley (ENG)	Port Vale (ENG)	Free	

=== Out ===
Date	Pos.	Player	To	Fee	Ref.
25 June 2024	CB	Udoka Godwin-Malife (ENG)	Burton Albion (ENG)	Undisclosed	
8 July 2024	CB	Harley Hunt (ENG)	Middlesbrough (ENG)	Undisclosed	
12 July 2024	CM	Ricky Aguiar (ENG)	York City (ENG)	Undisclosed	

=== Loaned in ===
Date	Pos.	Player	From	Date until	Ref.
26 July 2024	CB	Miguel Freckleton (ENG)	Sheffield United (ENG)	End of Season	
30 July 2024	AM	Joel Cotterill (WAL)	Swansea City (WAL)	End of Season	
26 August 2024	CF	Kabongo Tshimanga (ENG)	Peterborough United (ENG)	End of Season	
30 August 2024	GK	Daniel Barden (WAL)	Norwich City (ENG)	7 March 2025 (Note: On 7 March, Barden was recalled to his parent club, Norwich)	
10 January 2025	CF	Tom Nichols (ENG)	Mansfield Town (ENG)	End of Season	
23 January 2025	CF	Joe Westley (ENG)	Burnley (ENG)	End of Season	

=== Loaned out ===
Date	Pos.	Player	To	Date until	Ref.
22 August 2024	RM	Anton Dworzak (ENG)	Swindon Supermarine (ENG)	End of Season (Note: On 22 October, Dworzak's loan at Swindon Supermarine was extended until January) (Note: On 14 January, Dworzak's loan at Swindon Supermarine was extended until the end of season)	
30 August 2024	CB	Pharrell Johnson (ENG)	Truro City (ENG)	3 January 2025 (Note: On 3 January, Johnson was recalled from his loan at Truro)	
30 August 2024	CM	Saidou Khan (GAM)	Tranmere Rovers (ENG)	End of Season	
6 September 2024	LB	Billy Kirkman (ENG)	Weston-super-Mare (ENG)	1 January 2025	
7 September 2024	CB	Jaxon Brown (ENG)	Canvey Island (ENG)	5 October 2024	
20 September 2024	LM	Tariq Uwakwe (ENG)	Maidenhead United (ENG)	19 October 2024	
22 September 2024	CB	Sonny Hart (ENG)	Canvey Island (ENG)	20 October 2024	
8 November 2024	GK	Redman Evans (ENG)	Westbury United (ENG)	1 January 2025 (Note: On 4 December, Evans' loan at Westbury United was extended for a further month, Then on January 19, it was extended until the end of season)	
22 November 2024	CM	Dylan Mitchell (ENG)	Hereford (ENG)	End of Season (Note: On 24 December, Mitchell's loan at Hereford was extended for a further month, Then on January 24, it was extended again for another month, Then, on 24 February it was extended until the end of season)	
20 December 2024	CM	Conor Britchford-Stanley (ENG)	Highworth Town (ENG)	18 January 2025	
24 December 2024	LW	Sean McGurk (ENG)	Yeovil Town (ENG)	End of Season (Note: On 23 January, McGurk's loan at Yeovil was extended until end of season)	
11 January 2025	CM	Jaxon Brown (ENG)	Aveley (ENG)	End of Season	
18 January 2025	CB	Sonny Hart (ENG)	Farnborough (ENG)	4 April 2025 (Note: On 18 February, Hart's loan at Farnborough was extended until the end of season, However on 4 April, Hart was recalled from his loan)	
14 February 2025	CF	Miles Obodo (ENG)	Marlow (ENG)	14 March 2025	
15 February 2025	GK	Redman Evans (ENG)	Hungerford Town (ENG)	4 April 2025 (Note: On 4 April, Evans was recalled from his loan at Hungerford)	
18 February 2025	CM	Alistair Stewart (ENG)	Plymouth Parkway (ENG)	18 March 2025	
3 March 2025	CB	Antony McCormick (ENG)	Salisbury (ENG)	31 March 2025	
3 March 2025	LM	Tariq Uwakwe (ENG)	Aldershot Town (ENG)	End of Season	
8 March 2025	CM	Dani González (ESP)	Weymouth (ENG)	5 April 2025	
8 March 2025	RB	Liam Hutt (ENG)	Weymouth (ENG)	5 April 2025	
19 March 2025	GK	Lucas Myers (ENG)	Melksham Town (ENG)	16 April 2025	
28 March 2025	CF	George Alston (ENG)	Swindon Supermarine (ENG)	End of Season	

=== Released / Out of Contract ===
Date	Pos.	Player	Subsequent club	Join date	Ref.
30 June 2024	CB	Frazer Blake-Tracy (ENG)	Mansfield Town (ENG)	1 July 2024	
30 June 2024	CF	Rushian Hepburn-Murphy (ENG)	Crawley Town (ENG)	1 July 2024	
30 June 2024	RW	Tyrese Shade (SKN)	Eastleigh (ENG)	3 July 2024	
30 June 2024	CM	George McEachran (ENG)	Grimsby Town (ENG)	4 July 2024	
30 June 2024	RB	Brooklyn Genesini (ENG)	Weymouth (ENG)	4 July 2024	
10 July 2024	LB	Williams Kokolo (FRA)	Laval (FRA)	10 July 2024	
30 June 2024	CF	Charlie Austin (ENG)	AFC Totton (ENG)	31 July 2024	
30 June 2024	LB	Reece Devine (ENG)	Kidderminster Harriers (ENG)	2 August 2024	
30 June 2024	CF	Tomi Adeloye (ENG)	Greenock Morton (SCO)	14 February 2025	
30 June 2024	GK	Conor Brann (IRL)	Cork City (IRL)	9 December 2024	
30 June 2024	CB	Tom Brewitt (ENG)	Orange County (USA)	13 February 2025	
30 June 2024	CB	Tom Clayton (SCO)			
13 November 2024	RB	Jeff King (ENG)	York City (ENG)	13 November 2024	
17 January 2025	LB	Rosaire Longelo (ENG)	Salford City (ENG)	17 January 2025	

== Pre-season and friendlies ==
On 24 May, Swindon Town announced their initial pre-season schedule, with matches against Swindon Supermarine, Hungerford Town and Melksham Town. A home friendly versus Wycombe Wanderers was later confirmed. On 17 June, a trip to face Eastleigh was also added.

Win Draw Loss Fixtures

6 July 2024 Friendly	Swindon Supermarine	1–4	Swindon Town	South Marston
14:00 BST	Williams 29'	Report	Cain 52'; Glatzel 63', 84'; Brown 66'	Stadium: Webbswood Stadium

9 July 2024 Friendly	Hungerford Town	0–2	Swindon Town	Hungerford
19:00 BST		Report	Glatzel 47'; Dworzak 61'	Stadium: Bulpit Lane

13 July 2024 Friendly	Swansea City	3–1	Swindon Town	Fairwood
14:00 BST	Cullen 13'; Grimes 38' (pen.); Kukharevych 71'	Report	Brown 64'	Stadium: Swansea City Training Ground; Attendance: 0 (behind-closed-doors)

16 July 2024 Friendly	Melksham Town	1–3	Swindon Town	Melksham
19:30 BST	Graham 2'	Report	Smith 4', 9'; Glatzel 90'	Stadium: Oakfield Stadium

19 July 2024 Friendly	Southampton U21	1–2	Swindon Town	Marchwood
13:00 BST	Trialist 22'	Report	Glatzel 46'; Drinan 84'	Stadium: Staplewood Training Ground; Attendance: 0 (behind-closed-doors)

28 July 2024 Friendly	Eastleigh	1–0	Swindon Town	Eastleigh
13:00 BST	Bycroft 3' (o.g.)	Report		Stadium: Ten Acres

3 August 2024 Friendly	Swindon Town	1–0	Wycombe Wanderers	Swindon
15:00 BST	Clarke 68'	Report		Stadium: County Ground; Attendance: 2,335

== Competitions ==
=== League Two ===
==== League table ====
Pos	Team	Pld	W	D	L	GF	GA	GD	Pts
10	Colchester United	46	16	19	11	52	47	+5	67
11	Bromley	46	17	15	14	64	59	+5	66
12	Swindon Town	46	15	17	14	71	63	+8	62
13	Crewe Alexandra	46	15	17	14	49	48	+1	62
14	Fleetwood Town	46	15	15	16	60	60	0	60

Source: EFL Official Website
Rules for classification: 1) Points; 2) Goal difference; 3) Number of goals scored; 4) Head-to-head results; 5) Wins; 6) Away goals; 7) Penalty points (sec 9.5); 8) 12-point sending off offences

==== Results summary ====
Overall								Home						Away					
Pld	W	D	L	GF	GA	GD	Pts	W	D	L	GF	GA	GD	W	D	L	GF	GA	GD
46	15	17	14	71	63	+8	62	9	8	6	39	33	+6	6	9	8	32	30	+2

Last updated: 3 May 2025.
Source: Soccerway

==== Results by round ====
Round	1	2	3	4	5	6	7	8	9	10	11	12	13	14	15	16	17	18	19	20	21	22	23	24	25	26	27	28	29	30	31	32	33	34	35	36	37	38	39	40	41	42	43	44	45	46
Ground	A	H	A	H	A	H	H	A	A	H	A	H	A	H	A	A	H	A	H	A	H	A	A	H	A	H	H	A	H	A	H	A	H	A	H	A	H	H	A	H	A	H	A	H	A	H
Result	D	L	D	L	D	W	L	L	D	D	W	L	L	D	L	D	L	L	W	L	W	D	D	W	L	D	W	W	W	W	D	L	W	W	D	D	D	D	L	W	W	W	W	L	D	D
Position	12	21	21	23	21	18	21	21	21	21	18	21	22	22	22	22	22	24	22	22	21	21	21	19	22	20	19	18	16	14	15	17	15	14	14	15	15	15	15	14	14	12	12	13	13	12
Points	1	1	2	2	3	6	6	6	7	8	11	11	11	12	12	13	13	13	16	16	19	20	21	24	24	25	28	31	34	37	38	38	41	44	45	46	47	48	48	51	54	57	60	60	61	62

Source: EFL
A = Away; H = Home; W = Win; D = Draw; L = Loss; P = Postponed

==== Matches ====
On 26 June, the League Two fixtures were announced.

Win Draw Loss Fixtures

9 August 2024 1	Chesterfield	1–1	Swindon Town	Chesterfield
20:00 BST	Dobra 15'	Report	King (yellow card) 17'; Cotterill (yellow card) 42'; Smith (yellow card) 55'; Wright 64', (yellow card) 66'; Clarke (yellow card) 89'	Stadium: SMH Group Stadium; Attendance: 9,262; Referee: Scott Oldham

17 August 2024 2	Swindon Town	0–4	Walsall	Swindon
15:00 BST	Smith (yellow card) 37'; Clarke (yellow card) 48'	Report	Gordon 33'; Matt 41'; Allen 49'; Adomah 64'	Stadium: County Ground; Attendance: 7,786; Referee: Lee Swabey

24 August 2024 3	Crewe Alexandra	0–0	Swindon Town	Crewe
12:30 BST	Demetriou (yellow card) 44'; Tabiner (yellow card) 51'	Report	Cotterill (yellow card) 24'	Stadium: Gresty Road; Attendance: 4,402; Referee: Alex Chilowicz
Note: Fixture was initially scheduled for a 15:00 kick-off, but was moved for live Sky Sports broadcast.

31 August 2024 4	Swindon Town	1–2	Notts County	Swindon
15:00 BST	Kilkenny 21'	Report	McGoldrick 30', 80', (yellow card) 69'	Stadium: County Ground; Attendance: 7,326; Referee: Dale Baines

7 September 2024 5	Barrow	1–1	Swindon Town	Barrow-in-Furness
15:00 BST	Garner 35'; Farman (red card) 42'; Newby (yellow card) 55'	Report	Wright (yellow card) 42'; Kilkenny (yellow card) 61'; Smith (red card) 65'; Butterworth 90+8'	Stadium: Holker Street; Attendance: 3,763; Referee: Zac Kennard-Kettle

14 September 2024 6	Swindon Town	4–0	Newport County	Swindon
12:30 BST	Tshimanga 4'; Glatzel 18'; Baker 21' (o.g.); Cotterill 45'; Kilkenny (yellow card) 56'	Report		Stadium: County Ground; Attendance: 6,857; Referee: Simon Mather
Note: Fixture was initially scheduled for a 15:00 kick-off, but was moved for live Sky Sports broadcast.

21 September 2024 7	Swindon Town	0–2	Carlisle United	Swindon
15:00 BST		Report	Lavelle 42'; Jones (yellow card) 47'; Harper (yellow card) 49'; Armstrong 72'; Wyke (yellow card) 79'	Stadium: County Ground; Attendance: 6,878; Referee: Carl Brook

28 September 2024 8	Port Vale	2–1	Swindon Town	Burslem
15:00 BST	Garrity (yellow card) 59'; Byers 61' (yellow card) 90'; Cover 85'; Sang (yellow card) 87'	Report	Wright 89'; Cotterill (yellow card) 90+4'	Stadium: Vale Park; Attendance: 6,747; Referee: Thomas Parsons

1 October 2024 9	Tranmere Rovers	1–1	Swindon Town	Birkenhead
19:45 BST	Dennis 17'	Report	King (yellow card) 24'; Merrie 54' (o.g.)	Stadium: Prenton Park; Attendance: 5,120; Referee: Seb Stockbridge

5 October 2024 10	Swindon Town	0–0	Harrogate Town	Swindon
15:00 BST	Longelo (yellow card) 86'	Report	Muldoon (yellow card) 90+3'	Stadium: County Ground; Attendance: 6,333; Referee: Martin Woods

12 October 2024 11	Cheltenham Town	2–3	Swindon Town	Cheltenham
15:00 BST	Shipley (yellow card) 43'; Miller (yellow card) 59', (goal) 63'; Archer 78'	Report	Ofoborh (yellow card) 14'; Cox 30', (yellow card) 45+2'; Wright 34', (yellow card) 90+5'; McGregor 47'; Longelo (yellow card) 85'; Barden (yellow card) 90'	Stadium: Whaddon Road; Attendance: 5,561; Referee: Dale Baines

19 October 2024 12	Swindon Town	1–2	Doncaster Rovers	Swindon
15:00 BST	Clarke (yellow card) 28'; Butterworth (yellow card) 38'; Smith 75'; Freckleton (yellow card) 90+4'	Report	Sharp (yellow card) 51'; Olowu 58'; Kelly (yellow card) 77'; Ironside 90+4' (pen.)	Stadium: County Ground; Attendance: 6,837; Referee: Craig Hicks

22 October 2024 13	Salford City	2–1	Swindon Town	Salford
19:45 BST	N'Mai 3'; Edwards (yellow card) 15'; Taylor 69'; Kouassi (yellow card) 15'	Report	Cox (yellow card) 39'; Smith 50'	Stadium: Moor Lane; Attendance: 2,145; Referee: Darren Drysdale

26 October 2024 14	Swindon Town	1–1	Gillingham	Swindon
15:00 BST	Hall (red card) 8'; Clarke (yellow card) 45+6'; Smith 90+3'	Report	Dieng 16'; E. Williams (yellow card) 61'; Hawkins (yellow card) 81'	Stadium: County Ground; Attendance: 7,325; Referee: Anthony Backhouse

9 November 2024 15	Milton Keynes Dons	3–1	Swindon Town	Denbigh
15:00 GMT	Thompson-Sommers 45+4'; Williams 57'; Gilbey 64'; Hendry (yellow card) 86'	Report	Smith 1' (yellow card) 62'	Stadium: Stadium MK; Attendance: 7,407; Referee: Sunny Sukhvir Gill

16 November 2024 16	Accrington Stanley	2–2	Swindon Town	Accrington
15:00 GMT	Aljofree 16'; Rawson 30'; Woods (yellow card) 77'; Costelloe (yellow card) 90'	Report	Smith 11'; McGregor (yellow card) 53'; Glatzel (yellow card) 36'; Delaney (yellow card) 65'; Butterworth (yellow card) 36' (goal) 69'	Stadium: Crown Ground; Attendance: 2,755; Referee: Ollie Yates

23 November 2024 17	Swindon Town	2–3	Morecambe	Swindon
15:00 GMT	Drinan 32'; Delaney 49'; Cox (yellow card) 88'	Report	Stott 6'; Tutonda (yellow card) 10'; Tollitt 14'; Hope 78'	Stadium: County Ground; Attendance: 6,494; Referee: Tom Nield

3 December 2024 18	Colchester United	4–0	Swindon Town	Colchester
19:45 GMT	Smith 9' (o.g.); Tovide 12', 26'; Payne 38'	Report	Cotterill (yellow card) 34'; Hall (yellow card) 43'; McGregor (yellow card) 58'	Stadium: Colchester Community Stadium; Attendance: 3,401; Referee: Andrew Humphries

7 December 2024 19	Swindon Town	3–1	Fleetwood Town	Swindon
15:00 GMT	Smith 8', 28', 58'; Clarke (yellow card) 39'; Glatzel (penalty missed) 63'	Report	Mayor (yellow card) 33'; Broom (yellow card) 44'; Virtue 67'	Stadium: County Ground; Attendance: 5,819; Referee: Ben Atkinson

14 December 2024 20	Bradford City	1–0	Swindon Town	Bradford
15:00 GMT	Kavanagh 24'; Pointon (yellow card) 74'; Sarcevic (yellow card) 81'	Report	Smith (yellow card) 7'; McGregor (yellow card) 68'	Stadium: Valley Parade; Attendance: 15,751; Referee: Edward Duckworth

21 December 2024 21	Swindon Town	3–1	Grimsby Town	Swindon
15:00 GMT	Clarke 3', (yellow card) 66'; Cox (yellow card) 39'; Tshimanga 41', 61'; Wright (penalty missed) 52'	Report	Rose 72' (pen.); Hume (yellow card) 88'	Stadium: County Ground; Attendance: 7,453; Referee: Matthew Russell

26 December 2024 22	AFC Wimbledon	1–1	Swindon Town	Wimbledon
15:00 GMT	Tilley 56'	Report	Smith 10'; Wright (yellow card) 88'; Delaney (yellow card) 90+3'	Stadium: Plough Lane; Attendance: 8,304; Referee: Abigail Byrne

29 December 2024 23	Bromley	1–1	Swindon Town	Bromley
12:30 GMT	Sowunmi 69' (yellow card) 85'; Grant (yellow card) 80'	Report	Ofoborh (yellow card) 20'; Kilkenny (yellow card) 28'; Longelo (yellow card) 28' (goal) 72'; Clarke (yellow card) 67'	Stadium: Hayes Lane; Attendance: 3,833; Referee: Zac Kennard-Kettle
Note: Fixture was initially scheduled for 28 December, but was moved for live Sky Sports broadcast.

1 January 2025 24	Swindon Town	3–2	Colchester United	Swindon
15:00 GMT	Clarke 15'; Sobowale (yellow card) 45+1'; Barden (yellow card) 60'; Drinan 82'; Cox 90+8' (pen.) (yellow card) 90+9'	Report	McDonnell (yellow card) 30'; Gordon (yellow card) 45+1'; Payne 44' (pen.), 61' (pen.); Iandolo (yellow card) 78' (yellow-red card) 90+4'	Stadium: County Ground; Attendance: 7,680; Referee: Tom Reeves

4 January 2025 25	Notts County	2–0	Swindon Town	Nottingham
12:30 GMT	McGoldrick 17', 36'	Report	Kilkenny (yellow card) 29'; Delaney (yellow card) 58'; Clarke (yellow card) 82'; Wright (yellow card) 85'	Stadium: Meadow Lane; Attendance: 9,296; Referee: Sam Purkiss
Note: Fixture was initially scheduled for a 15:00 kick-off, but was moved for live Sky Sports broadcast.

11 January 2025 26	Swindon Town	0–0	Crewe Alexandra	Swindon
15:00 GMT		Report	Demetriou (yellow card) 64'	Stadium: County Ground; Attendance: 6,638; Referee: Lee Swabey

18 January 2025 27	Swindon Town	2–0	Barrow	Swindon
15:00 GMT	Ofoborh 8', (yellow card) 90+3'; Sobowale (yellow card) 77'; Smith 87'	Report		Stadium: County Ground; Attendance: 6,398; Referee: Scott Jackson

24 January 2025 28	Newport County	1–2	Swindon Town	Newport
19:45 GMT	Hudlin 12', (yellow card) 45+1'; Evans (yellow card) 47'; Whitmore (yellow card) 57'	Report	Smith 15', (yellow card) 45+1'; Westley 75'	Stadium: Rodney Parade; Attendance: 5,244; Referee: Ben Speedie
Note: Fixture was initially scheduled for 25 January, but was moved for live Sky Sports broadcast.

28 January 2025 29	Swindon Town	3–1	Tranmere Rovers	Swindon
19:45 GMT	Smith (yellow card) 22', (goal) 90'; Clarke (yellow card) 36'; Glatzel 87'; Tshimanga 90+5' (pen.)	Report	Davison 7', (yellow card) 53'; Norman (yellow card) 19' (yellow-red card) 62'; Drysdale (yellow card) 22' (yellow-red card) 90+4'	Stadium: County Ground; Attendance: 6,180; Referee: James Bell

1 February 2025 30	Carlisle United	1–5	Swindon Town	Carlisle
15:00 GMT	Jones (yellow card) 36' (yellow-red card) 66'; Hugill 88'	Report	Butterworth 45+2'; Drinan 47'; Smith (yellow card) 63'; Westley 83'; Delaney (yellow card) 89'; Glatzel 90'; Wright 90+6'	Stadium: Brunton Park; Attendance: 7,457; Referee: Ross Joyce

8 February 2025 31	Swindon Town	3–3	Port Vale	Swindon
12:30 GMT	Wright 20' (pen.); Butterworth 45'; Cain (yellow card) 57'; Cotterill 63'	Report	Headley 31'; Tolaj 40', 87'; John (yellow card) 49'; Heneghan (yellow card) 56'; Smith (yellow card) 66'	Stadium: County Ground; Attendance: 7,606; Referee: Declan Bourne
Note: Fixture was initially scheduled for a 15:00 kick-off, but was moved for live Sky Sports broadcasting.

15 February 2025 32	Harrogate Town	1–0	Swindon Town	Harrogate
15:00 GMT	Moon 53'	Report		Stadium: Wetherby Road; Attendance: 2,909; Referee: Simon Mather

22 February 2025 33	Swindon Town	1–0	Chesterfield	Swindon
15:00 GMT	Smith (yellow card) 9'; McGregor (yellow card) 42'; Wright (yellow card) 45+5'; Tshimanga 61' (pen.)	Report	Donacien (yellow card) 45+3'; Metcalfe (yellow card) 90+3'	Stadium: County Ground; Attendance: 7,531; Referee: Charles Breakspear

1 March 2025 34	Walsall	0–1	Swindon Town	Walsall
15:00 GMT	Harrison (yellow card) 28'	Report	Clarke (yellow card) 22'; Cotterill 59'; Nichols (yellow card) 64'; Ofoboth (yellow card) 66'	Stadium: Bescot Stadium; Attendance: 6,910; Referee: Paul Howard

4 March 2025 35	Swindon Town	2–2	Salford City	Swindon
19:45 GMT	Nichols 7'; Smith 71'	Report	Adelakun 27'; N'Mai 72'; Mnoga (yellow card) 74'	Stadium: County Ground; Attendance: 6,465; Referee: Stephen Parkinson

8 March 2025 36	Doncaster Rovers	2–2	Swindon Town	Doncaster
15:00 GMT	Street 1'; Sbarra 22'; Molyneux (yellow card) 83'	Report	Butterworth 50'; Westley 51'; Freckleton (yellow card) 83'	Stadium: Eco-Power Stadium; Attendance: 7,440; Referee: Leigh Doughty

15 March 2025 37	Swindon Town	3–3	Cheltenham Town	Swindon
12:30 GMT	Wright 45+4'; Tshimanga 67' (pen.) (yellow card) 79'; Clarke (yellow card) 71' (goal) 88'	Report	Thomas 8'; Stubbs (yellow card) 34'; Dieng 48' (yellow card) 79'; Wright 54' (o.g.); Adedokun (yellow card) 58'; Bradbury (yellow card) 63' (yellow-red card) 66'	Stadium: County Ground; Attendance: 8,556; Referee: Ollie Yates
Note: Fixture was initially scheduled for a 15:00 kick-off, but was moved for live Sky Sports broadcasting.

22 March 2025 38	Swindon Town	0–0	Accrington Stanley	Swindon
15:00 GMT	Smith (yellow card) 21'; Sobowale (yellow card) 33'; Ripley (yellow card) 57'	Report	Batty (yellow card) 39'; Mooney (yellow card) 57'	Stadium: County Ground; Attendance: 7,168; Referee: Aaron Bannister

29 March 2025 39	Morecambe	1–0	Swindon Town	Morecambe
15:00 GMT	Angol 38'; White (yellow card) 73'	Report	Nichols (yellow card) 41'	Stadium: Mazuma Mobile Stadium; Attendance: 3,419; Referee: Jamie O'Connor

1 April 2025 40	Swindon Town	2–1	AFC Wimbledon	Swindon
19:45 BST	Tshimanga 90' (pen.), 90+5' (pen.)	Report	Lewis (yellow card) 6'; O'Toole (yellow card) 45' (yellow-red card) 90+3'; Browne 56'; Smith (yellow card) 63'; Reeves (yellow card) 90+3'	Stadium: County Ground; Attendance: 6,500; Referee: James Durkin

5 April 2025 41	Fleetwood Town	0–4	Swindon Town	Fleetwood
15:00 BST	Bennett (yellow card) 36'; Devonport (yellow card) 44'; Wiredu (yellow card) 46'	Report	Tshimanga 38' (pen.) (yellow card) 45'; Freckleton 67'; Bennett 75' (o.g.); Ofoborh 88'	Stadium: Highbury Stadium; Attendance: 2,742; Referee: Stuart Morland

12 April 2025 42	Swindon Town	5–4	Bradford City	Swindon
12:30 BST	Byrne 22' (o.g.); Tshimanga 45+4'; Smith 62', 90' (yellow card) 90+3'; Butterworth (yellow card) 82'; Shepherd 90+5' (o.g.)	Report	Kavanagh 6', 10', 35'; Smallwood (red card) 15'; Khela (yellow card) 30'; Halliday (yellow card) 64' (goal) 77'; Shepherd (yellow card) 80'; Adaramola (yellow card) 82'	Stadium: County Ground; Attendance: 8,051; Referee: Thomas Kirk
Note: Fixture was initially scheduled for a 15:00 kick-off, but was moved for live Sky Sports broadcasting.

18 April 2025 43	Grimsby Town	0–4	Swindon Town	Cleethorpes
15:00 BST	Turi (yellow card) 59'	Report	Nichols 8'; Clarke 32' (yellow card) 76'; Tshimanga 65'; Freckleton (yellow card) 81'; Ameen 90+5'	Stadium: Blundell Park; Attendance: 7,624; Referee: Seb Stockbridge

21 April 2025 44	Swindon Town	0–1	Bromley	Swindon
15:00 BST	Tshimanga (penalty missed) 45'	Report	Arthurs (yellow card) 21'; Mayor (yellow card) 25'; Whitely (yellow card) 66'; Wright 88' (o.g.)	Stadium: County Ground; Attendance: 8,884; Referee: William Davis

26 April 2025 45	Gillingham	1–1	Swindon Town	Gillingham
15:00 BST	Gale (yellow card) 13'; Gbode 61' (yellow card) 69' (yellow-red card) 90+4'; Williams (yellow card) 67' (yellow-red card) 90+3'	Report	Tshimanga (yellow card) 45'; Wright 67'; Glatzel (yellow card) 78'; Freckleton (yellow card) 90+4'	Stadium: Priestfield Stadium; Attendance: 7,669; Referee: Neil Hair

3 May 2025 46	Swindon Town	0–0	Milton Keynes Dons	Swindon
15:00 BST	Smith (yellow card) 24'	Report	Sanders (yellow card) 16'; Hendry (yellow card) 68'	Stadium: County Ground; Attendance: 9,503; Referee: Declan Bourne

=== FA Cup ===
Swindon Town were drawn at home to Colchester United in the first round and away to Accrington Stanley in the second round.

Win Draw Loss Fixtures

2 November 2024 First round	Swindon Town	2–1	Colchester United	Swindon
15:00 GMT	Wright (yellow card) 23'; McGregor 83' (yellow card) 102'; Smith (yellow card) 85'; Tshimanga 106'	Report	Flanagan (yellow card) 10'; McDonnell (yellow card) 23'; Gordon (yellow card) 63'; Anderson 64'; Hunt (yellow card) 71'; Iandolo (yellow card) 85'; Donnelly (yellow card) 90'	Stadium: County Ground; Attendance: 4,855; Referee: Scott Jackson

30 November 2024 Second round	Accrington Stanley	2–2 (a.e.t.) (4–1 p)	Swindon Town	Accrington
15:00 GMT	Walton 17', 90+1'; Conneely (yellow card) 117'	Report	Kilkenny (yellow card) 25'; Butterworth (red card) 41'; Hall 45+2'; Smith (penalty missed) 63'; Cotterill 71'	Stadium: Crown Ground; Attendance: 1,534; Referee: Geoff Eltringham
	Penalties
	Popoola (penalty scored); Knowles (penalty scored); Woods (penalty scored); Khumbeni (penalty scored)		Drinan (penalty missed); Cotterill (penalty missed); Wright (penalty scored)

=== EFL Cup ===
On 27 June, the draw for the first round was made, with Swindon being drawn away against Crawley Town.

Win Draw Loss Fixtures

13 August 2024 First round	Crawley Town	4–2	Swindon Town	Crawley
19:45 BST	Adeyemo 34'; Roles 56', 88', (yellow card) 78'; Khaleel (yellow card) 70', (goal) 89'; Flint (yellow card) 86'	Report	Ofoborh 60'; Wright (penalty missed) 65'; Smith 66', (yellow card) 90+6'	Stadium: Broadfield Stadium; Attendance: 2,396; Referee: Ben Atkinson

=== EFL Trophy ===
In the group stage, Swindon were drawn into Southern Group G alongside Bristol Rovers, Exeter City and Tottenham Hotspur U21. In the knockout stages, they were drawn away to Wycombe Wanderers in the round of 32 and at home to Birmingham City in the round of 16.

==== Group stage ====
Pos	Div	Team	Pld	W	PW	PL	L	GF	GA	GD	Pts	Qualification
1	L1	Exeter City	3	3	0	0	0	7	3	+4	9	Advance to Round 2
2	L2	Swindon Town	3	2	0	0	1	7	3	+4	6	Advance to Round 2
3	ACA	Tottenham Hotspur U21	3	0	1	0	2	4	7	−3	2	
4	L1	Bristol Rovers	3	0	0	1	2	5	10	−5	1	

Source: EFL

Win Draw Loss Fixtures

3 September 2024 Group stage	Exeter City	2–1	Swindon Town	Exeter
19:00 BST	Francis 65'; Aitchison 81'	Report	Cotterill 68'; Minturn (yellow card) 71'; Smith (yellow card) 78'; Delaney (yellow card) 90+2'	Stadium: St James Park; Attendance: 1,485; Referee: Ross Martin

8 October 2024 Group stage	Swindon Town	4–0	Bristol Rovers	Swindon
19:00 BST	Glatzel 2', 12'; McGregor 30'; Ameen 35'	Report	Hutchinson (yellow card) 28'; McCormick (yellow card) 59'	Stadium: County Ground; Attendance: 1,306; Referee: Sam Mulhall

5 November 2024 Group stage	Swindon Town	2–1	Tottenham Hotspur U21	Swindon
19:00 GMT	Butterworth 54'; McGurk 73'	Report	Hall 25'; Kyerematen (yellow card) 90+2'	Stadium: County Ground; Attendance: 1,816; Referee: Matthew Russell

==== Knoutout stages ====
10 December 2024 Round of 32	Wycombe Wanderers	1–2	Swindon Town	High Wycombe
19:00 GMT	Butcher (yellow card) 62'; Lubala 90+3'	Report	Kirkman 5'; Longelo (red card) 45+1'; Tshimanga 68'; Delaney (yellow card) 74'	Stadium: Adams Park; Attendance: 611; Referee: Farai Hallam

14 January 2025 Round of 16	Swindon Town	1–2	Birmingham City	Swindon
19:30 GMT	Tshimanga (yellow card) 21'; Smith 76'; Glatzel (yellow card) 90+2'	Report	Laird (yellow card) 47'; Yokoyama 49'; Davies (yellow card) 51'; Smith 89' (o.g.)	Stadium: County Ground; Attendance: 3,509; Referee: Edward Duckworth

== Statistics ==
=== Appearances and goals ===
As of match played 3 May 2025

Players with no appearances are not included on the list

No.	Pos	Nat	Player	Total		League Two		FA Cup		EFL Cup		EFL Trophy	
No.	Pos	Nat	Player	Apps	Goals	Apps	Goals	Apps	Goals	Apps	Goals	Apps	Goals
1	GK	(England) ENG	Jack Bycroft	25	0	20+1	0	2+0	0	1+0	0	1+0	0
2	DF	(Republic of Ireland) IRL	Tunmise Sobowale	44	0	27+10	0	2+0	0	1+0	0	4+0	0
4	DF	(Republic of Ireland) IRL	Ryan Delaney	25	1	19+2	1	1+0	0	0+0	0	2+1	0
5	DF	(England) ENG	Will Wright	52	6	45+1	6	2+0	0	1+0	0	2+1	0
6	MF	(Nigeria) NGR	Nnamdi Ofoborh	42	3	23+14	2	0+1	0	1+0	1	2+1	0
7	MF	(Wales) WAL	Joel Cotterill	48	5	30+11	3	0+2	1	1+0	0	4+0	1
8	MF	(England) ENG	Ollie Clarke	33	4	25+5	4	1+0	0	0+1	0	0+1	0
9	FW	(Germany) GER	Paul Glatzel	47	5	20+20	3	0+1	0	1+0	0	2+3	2
10	FW	(England) ENG	Harry Smith	44	17	37+2	15	2+0	0	0+1	1	0+2	1
11	FW	(England) ENG	Sean McGurk	12	1	1+7	0	0+1	0	0+0	0	2+1	1
13	GK	(England) ENG	Connor Ripley	14	0	14+0	0	0+0	0	0+0	0	0+0	0
16	MF	(England) ENG	Jake Cain	25	0	9+10	0	0+0	0	1+0	0	5+0	0
17	MF	(England) ENG	Tom Nichols	20	2	16+4	2	0+0	0	0+0	0	0+0	0
18	MF	(Republic of Ireland) IRL	Gavin Kilkenny	48	1	39+3	1	2+0	0	0+0	0	3+1	0
20	DF	(England) ENG	Miguel Freckleton	32	1	25+3	1	1+0	0	1+0	0	2+0	0
21	FW	(England) ENG	Kabongo Tshimanga	44	13	25+14	11	2+0	1	0+0	0	3+0	1
22	FW	(England) ENG	Danny Butterworth	40	7	20+14	6	1+1	0	0+0	0	4+0	1
23	FW	(Republic of Ireland) IRL	Aaron Drinan	34	3	16+12	3	2+0	0	1+0	0	2+1	0
24	DF	(England) ENG	Grant Hall	18	1	11+3	0	1+0	1	0+1	0	0+2	0
25	FW	(England) ENG	Joe Westley	17	3	3+14	3	0+0	0	0+0	0	0+0	0
27	DF	(England) ENG	George Cox	29	2	21+5	2	2+0	0	0+0	0	0+1	0
31	DF	(England) ENG	Harrison Minturn	12	0	3+4	0	1+1	0	0+1	0	2+0	0
33	DF	(England) ENG	Joel McGregor	24	3	14+5	1	0+2	1	0+0	0	2+1	1
34	DF	(England) ENG	Billy Kirkman	15	1	10+3	0	0+0	0	0+0	0	2+0	1
35	MF	(England) ENG	Jaxon Brown	3	0	2+1	0	0+0	0	0+0	0	0+0	0
36	DF	(England) ENG	Sonny Hart	1	0	0+1	0	0+0	0	0+0	0	0+0	0
38	MF	(England) ENG	Harry Chard	1	0	0+0	0	0+0	0	0+0	0	0+1	0
39	MF	(England) ENG	Dylan Mitchell	5	0	0+2	0	0+0	0	0+1	0	0+2	0
40	MF	(Spain) ESP	Dani González	1	0	0+0	0	0+0	0	0+0	0	0+1	0
41	FW	(England) ENG	Miles Obodo	1	0	0+0	0	0+0	0	0+0	0	0+1	0
42	FW	(Iraq) IRQ	Botan Ameen	17	2	3+11	1	0+0	0	0+0	0	2+1	1
43	MF	(England) ENG	George Alston	1	0	0+1	0	0+0	0	0+0	0	0+0	0
45	DF	(England) ENG	Antony McCormick	2	0	0+0	0	0+0	0	0+0	0	2+0	0
46	MF	(England) ENG	Owen Foye	2	0	0+1	0	0+0	0	0+0	0	0+1	0
Player(s) who whilst on loan but returned to parent club during the season:
12	GK	(Wales) WAL	Daniel Barden	16	0	12+0	0	0+0	0	0+0	0	4+0	0
Player(s) who featured but departed the club permanently during the season:
14	DF	(England) ENG	Rosaire Longelo	21	1	6+10	1	0+1	0	1+0	0	2+1	0
17	DF	(England) ENG	Jeff King	11	0	8+0	0	0+0	0	1+0	0	1+1	0
