= 2023–24 Swindon Town F.C. season =

145th season in existence of Swindon Town FC

Swindon Town
2023–24 season
- Chairman: Clem Morfuni
- Manager: Michael Flynn (until 15 January); Gavin Gunning (interim, from 15 January)
- Stadium: County Ground
- League Two: 19th
- FA Cup: First round (eliminated by Aldershot Town)
- EFL Cup: First round (eliminated by Peterborough United)
- EFL Trophy: Group stage
- Top goalscorer: League: Young (16); All: Young & Kemp (16)
- Highest home attendance: 12,271 vs. Wrexham
- Biggest win: 6-0, 26 August 2023 vs. Crawley Town (H)
- Biggest defeat: 0-5, 10 October 2023 vs. Reading (A)
Home colours	Away colours	Third colours

The 2023–24 season is the 145th season in the history of Swindon Town and their third consecutive season in League Two. The club are participating in League Two, the FA Cup, the EFL Cup, and the EFL Trophy.

Manager Michael Flynn left the club on 15 January 2024, with coach Gavin Gunning becoming manager on an interim basis. Gunning remained head coach until the end of the season.

== Current squad ==
As of 29 March 2024

No.	Name	Position	Nationality	Place of birth	Date of birth (age)	Previous club	Date signed	Fee	Contract end
Goalkeepers
1	Jack Bycroft	GK	(England)	Salisbury	21 September 2001 (age 25)	Southampton	12 January 2024	Undisclosed	30 June 2025
25	Conor Brann	GK	(Republic of Ireland)		27 June 2003 (age 23)	(Republic of Ireland) Galway United	1 September 2022	Free	30 June 2024
44	Lewis Ward	GK	(England)		5 March 1997 (age 29)	Sutton United	22 August 2023	Free	30 June 2024
47	Redman Evans	GK	(England)			Academy	20 November 2023	Trainee	30 June 2024
Defenders
3	Pharrell Johnson	CB	(England)		19 May 2004 (age 22)	Nottingham Forest	17 January 2024	Undisclosed	30 June 2025
4	Tom Clayton	CB	(Scotland)	(England) Rainford	27 December 2000 (age 25)	Liverpool	12 July 2022	Undisclosed	30 June 2024
5	Frazer Blake-Tracy	CB	(England)	Dereham	10 September 1995 (age 31)	Burton Albion	31 January 2023	Undisclosed	30 June 2024
12	Tom Brewitt	CB	(England)	Liverpool	11 February 1997 (age 29)	(United States) Hartford Athletic	7 March 2023	Free	30 June 2024
17	Williams Kokolo	LB	(France)		9 June 2000 (age 26)	Burton Albion	11 November 2023	Free	30 June 2024
18	Reece Devine	LB	(England)	Stourbridge	18 December 2001 (age 24)	Manchester United	1 July 2022	Free	30 June 2024
22	Udoka Godwin-Malife	CB	(England)	Oxford	9 May 2000 (age 26)	Forest Green Rovers	3 August 2023	Undisclosed	30 June 2025
24	Conor McCarthy	CB	(Republic of Ireland)	Blarney	11 April 1998 (age 28)	Barnsley	17 January 2024	Loan	31 May 2024
31	Harrison Minturn	CB	(England)		26 December 2003 (age 22)	Academy	1 January 2022	Trainee	30 June 2025
35	Jaxon Brown	CB	(England)			Academy	8 August 2023	Trainee	30 June 2024
40	Harley Hunt	CB	(England)			Academy	22 August 2023	Trainee	30 June 2024
Midfielders
6	George McEachran	CM	(England)	Oxford	30 August 2000 (age 26)	Chelsea	13 February 2023	Free	30 June 2024
8	Saidou Khan	CM	(The Gambia)		5 December 1995 (age 30)	Chesterfield	15 July 2022	Undisclosed	30 June 2024
16	Jake Cain	CM	(England)	Wigan	2 September 2001 (age 25)	Liverpool	16 January 2023	Undisclosed	30 June 2025
19	Tariq Uwakwe	LM	(England)	Islington	19 November 1999 (age 26)	Crewe Alexandra	4 August 2023	Free	30 June 2025
20	Dawson Devoy	AM	(Republic of Ireland)	Ashbourne	20 November 2001 (age 24)	Milton Keynes Dons	5 January 2024	Loan	31 May 2024
29	Ricky Aguiar	CM	(England)		17 March 2001 (age 25)	Worthing	10 August 2021	Free	30 June 2025
37	Harvey Fox	CM	(England)		24 September 2004 (age 22)	Academy	1 July 2022	Trainee	30 June 2024
38	Abu Kanu	CM	(England)		14 June 2006 (age 20)	Academy	22 August 2023	Trainee	30 June 2024
39	Kian Larkins	CM	(England)			Academy	20 November 2023	Trainee	30 June 2024
—N/a	Nnamdi Ofoborh	CM	(Nigeria)	(England) Southwark	7 November 1999 (age 27)	(Scotland) Rangers	29 March 2024	Free	30 June 2024
Forwards
7	Zack Elbouzedi	RW	(Republic of Ireland)	Dublin	5 April 1998 (age 28)	(Sweden) AIK	30 January 2024	Loan	31 May 2024
9	Paul Glatzel	CF	(Germany)	(England) Liverpool	20 February 2001 (age 25)	Liverpool	12 January 2024	Undisclosed	30 June 2025
10	Harry McKirdy	RW	(England)	London	29 March 1997 (age 29)	(Scotland) Hibernian	1 February 2024	Loan	31 May 2024
11	Rushian Hepburn-Murphy	CF	(England)	Birmingham	28 August 1998 (age 28)	(Cyprus) Pafos	1 September 2022	Free	30 June 2024
23	Aaron Drinan	CF	(Republic of Ireland)	Cork	6 May 1998 (age 28)	Leyton Orient	1 February 2024	Undisclosed	30 June 2026
32	Charlie Austin	CF	(England)	Hungerford	5 July 1989 (age 37)	(Australia) Brisbane Roar	1 January 2023	Free	30 June 2024
41	Miles Obodo	CF	(England)	Basingstoke		Academy	22 August 2023	Trainee	30 June 2024
15	Sean McGurk	LW	(England)	Liverpool	15 March 2003 (age 23)	Leeds United	1 February 2024	Free	30 June 2025
Out on Loan
14	Brooklyn Genesini	RB	(England)	Yeovil	12 December 2001 (age 24)	Bournemouth	8 August 2023	Free	30 June 2025
26	Anton Dworzak	RM	(England)		3 March 2005 (age 21)	Academy	1 July 2023	Trainee	30 June 2025
27	Tomi Adeloye	CF	(England)	Sidcup	17 February 1996 (age 30)	(Scotland) Ayr United	15 July 2022	Free	30 June 2024
28	Tyrese Shade	RW	(Saint Kitts and Nevis)	(England) Birmingham	9 June 2000 (age 26)	Leicester City	1 July 2022	Free	30 June 2024
34	Archie Milne	CF	(England)		11 November 2005 (age 21)	Academy	20 November 2023	Trainee	30 June 2024
36	Sonny Hart	CB	(England)		8 May 2006 (age 20)	Academy	22 August 2023	Trainee	30 June 2024
42	Josh Keyes	CM	(England)		26 April 2006 (age 20)	Academy	22 August 2023	Trainee	30 June 2024
43	Fletcher Hubbard	CM	(England)			Academy	20 November 2023	Trainee	30 June 2024
45	Finn Adams	CB	(England)			Academy	22 August 2023	Trainee	30 June 2024

== Transfers ==
=== In ===
Date	Pos	Player	Transferred from	Fee	Ref
28 July 2023	DM	(Republic of Ireland) Liam Kinsella	(England) Walsall	Free Transfer	
3 August 2023	CB	(England) Udoka Godwin-Malife	(England) Forest Green Rovers	Undisclosed	
4 August 2023	LM	(England) Tariq Uwakwe	(England) Crewe Alexandra	Free Transfer	
8 August 2023	RB	(England) Brooklyn Genesini	(England) Bournemouth	Free Transfer	
22 August 2023	GK	(England) Lewis Ward	Free agent	—N/a	
11 November 2023	LB	(France) Williams Kokolo	Free agent	—N/a	
12 January 2024	GK	(England) Jack Bycroft	(England) Southampton	Undisclosed	
12 January 2024	CF	(Germany) Paul Glatzel	(England) Liverpool	Undisclosed	
17 January 2024	CB	(England) Pharrell Johnson	(England) Nottingham Forest	Undisclosed	
1 February 2024	CF	(Republic of Ireland) Aaron Drinan	(England) Leyton Orient	Undisclosed	
1 February 2024	LW	(England) Sean McGurk	(England) Leeds United	Free Transfer	
29 March 2024	CM	(Nigeria) Nnamdi Ofoborh	Free agent	—N/a	

=== Out ===
Date	Pos	Player	Transferred to	Fee	Ref
23 June 2023	LB	(England) Ellis Iandolo	(England) Colchester United	Undisclosed	
30 June 2023	CB	(France) Mathieu Baudry	Retired		
30 June 2023	CF	(Wales) George Cowmeadow	(England) Kidlington	Released	
30 June 2023	CM	(Italy) Mo Dabre	(England) Chelmsford City	Released	
30 June 2023	CB	(Wales) Cian Harries	(England) Aldershot Town	Released	
30 June 2023	LW	(England) Oscar Massey	(England) Penzance	Released	
30 June 2023	CF	(England) Harry Parsons	(England) Maidenhead United	Released	
30 June 2023	AM	(Wales) Morgan Roberts	(England) Brackley Town	Free	
30 June 2023	AM	(Wales) Jonny Williams	(England) Gillingham	Released	
28 July 2023	AM	(England) Ronan Darcy	(England) Crawley Town	Undisclosed	
3 August 2023	RB	(Portugal) Marcel Lavinier	(England) Forest Green Rovers	Undisclosed	
1 September 2023	CF	(England) Jacob Wakeling	(England) Peterborough United	Undisclosed	
17 January 2024	RM	(Burundi) Remeao Hutton	(England) Gillingham	Undisclosed	
18 January 2024	GK	(England) Lewis Ward	(England) Charlton Athletic	Mutual Consent	
24 January 2024	DM	(Republic of Ireland) Liam Kinsella	(England) Cheltenham Town	Free Transfer	

=== Loaned in ===
Date	Pos	Player	Loaned from	Date until	Ref
1 July 2023	GK	(England) Murphy Mahoney	(England) Queens Park Rangers	28 December 2023 (Note: On 28 December, Mahoney returned to QPR early due to picking up an injury.)	
18 July 2023	RW	(England) Dan Kemp	(England) Milton Keynes Dons	1 January 2024 (Note: On 1 January, Kemp was recalled back early from his season-long loan by parent club MK Dons.)	
2 August 2023	CF	(England) Jake Young	(England) Bradford City	2 January 2024 (Note: On 2 January, Young was recalled back early from his season-long loan by parent club Bradford.)	
4 August 2023	CB	(England) Benn Ward	(England) Burnley	8 January 2024 (Note: On 8 January, Ward was recalled back early from his season-long loan by parent club Burnley.)	
5 January 2024	AM	(Republic of Ireland) Dawson Devoy	(England) Milton Keynes Dons	End of Season	
17 January 2024	CB	(Republic of Ireland) Conor McCarthy	(England) Barnsley	End of Season	
30 January 2024	RW	(Republic of Ireland) Zack Elbouzedi	(Sweden) AIK	End of Season	
1 February 2024	RW	(England) Harry McKirdy	(Scotland) Hibernian	End of Season	

=== Loaned out ===
Date	Pos	Player	Loaned to	Until	Ref
22 July 2023	CM	(England) Ricky Aguiar	(England) Worthing	5 January 2024 (Note: On 5 January, Aguiar was recalled back early from his season-long loan at Worthing.)	
24 July 2023	CM	(England) Anton Dworzak	(England) Gloucester City	13 September 2023	
24 July 2023	CM	(England) Sonny Hart	(England) Gloucester City	13 September 2023	
27 July 2023	CF	(England) Tomi Adeloye	(Scotland) Partick Thistle	End of Season	
14 September 2023	CM	(England) Anton Dworzak	(England) North Leigh	12 October 2023	
29 September 2023	GK	(Republic of Ireland) Conor Brann	(England) Swindon Supermarine	2 February 2024 (Note: On 5 January, Brann's loan at Supermarine was extended until the end of season.) (Note: On 2 February, Brann was recalled back from his loan at Supermarine.)	
12 January 2024	CM	(England) Harvey Fox	(England) Didcot Town	10 February 2024	
8 February 2024	RW	(Saint Kitts and Nevis) Tyrese Shade	(England) Solihull Moors	End of Season	
1 March 2024	RM	(England) Anton Dworzak	(England) Hemel Hempstead Town	End of Season	
15 March 2024	RB	(England) Brooklyn Genesini	(England) Yeovil Town	End of Season	
19 March 2024	CB	(England) Sonny Hart	(England) Canvey Island	30 April 2024	
22 March 2024	CM	(England) Josh Keyes	(England) Cirencester Town	30 April 2024	
22 March 2024	CF	(England) Archie Milne	(England) Corsham Town	30 April 2024	
28 March 2024	CB	(England) Finn Adams	(England) Melksham Town	30 April 2024	
28 March 2024	CM	(England) Fletcher Hubbard	(England) Melksham Town	30 April 2024	

== Pre-season and friendlies ==
Swindon Town announced friendlies against Swindon Supermarine, Melksham Town, Bristol City and Hereford. On June 7, a further two friendlies were added against Eastleigh and Plymouth Argyle.

Win Draw Loss Fixtures

5 July 2023 Friendly	Swindon Supermarine	0–2	Swindon Town	Swindon
19:45 BST		Report	Cain 45'; Brewitt 78'	Stadium: Hunts Copse

8 July 2023 Friendly	Melksham Town	0–5	Swindon Town	Melksham
14:00 BST		Report	Austin 33'; Blake-Tracy 39'; Adeloye 50'; Shade 56'; Aguiar 68'	Stadium: Oakfield Stadium; Attendance: 1,514

11 July 2023 Friendly	Corsham Town	2–0	Swindon Town XI	Corsham
19:30 BST	Plummer 8'; Cooper 90'	Report		Stadium: Southbank; Attendance: 861

15 July 2023 Friendly	Swansea City	5–0	Swindon Town	Upper Killay
12:00 BST	Wood 43'; Piroe 52'; Thomas 54', 68', 73'	Report		Stadium: Fairwood Training Ground; Attendance: 0 (Behind closed doors)

18 July 2023 Friendly	Bristol City	7–1	Swindon Town	Failand
12:30 BST	Bell 18', 56'; Sykes 75'; Conway 85', 87', 99', 108'	Report	Hepburn-Murphy 23'	Stadium: Robins High Performance Centre; Attendance: 0 (Behind closed doors)
Note: Two 60-minute halves

18 July 2023 Friendly	Hereford	2–0	Swindon Town XI	Hereford
19:30 BST	Cowley 9', 77'			Stadium: Edgar Street; Attendance: 1,025

22 July 2023 Friendly	Eastleigh	2–2	Swindon Town	Eastleigh
13:00 BST	Quigley 75'; Boldewijn 82'	Report	Austin 35' (pen.); Khan 57'	Stadium: Ten Acres

29 July 2023 Friendly	Swindon Town	3–1	Plymouth Argyle	Swindon
15:00 BST	Kemp 57'; Hepburn-Murphy 59'; Wakeling 86'	Report	Whittaker 69'	Stadium: County Ground

== Competitions ==
=== Overall record ===
Competition	First match	Last match	Starting round	Record							
Competition	First match	Last match	Starting round	Pld	W	D	L	GF	GA	GD	Win %
League Two	5 Aug 2023		Matchday 1	46	14	12	20	77	83	−6	30.43
FA Cup	4 Nov 2023	4 Nov 2023	First round	1	0	0	1	4	7	−3	0.00
EFL Cup	8 Aug 2023	8 Aug 2023	First round	1	0	1	0	1	1	+0	0.00
EFL Trophy	22 Aug 2023	21 Nov 2023	Group stage	2	0	1	1	2	8	−6	0.00
Total				50	14	14	22	84	99	−15	28.00

Last updated: 1 April 2024
Source: Soccerway

=== League Two ===
==== League table ====
Pos	Team	Pld	W	D	L	GF	GA	GD	Pts
16	Tranmere Rovers	46	17	6	23	67	70	−3	57
17	Accrington Stanley	46	16	9	21	63	71	−8	57
18	Newport County	46	16	7	23	62	76	−14	55
19	Swindon Town	46	14	12	20	77	83	−6	54
20	Salford City	46	13	12	21	66	82	−16	51
21	Grimsby Town	46	11	16	19	57	74	−17	49
22	Colchester United	46	11	12	23	59	80	−21	45

Source: EFL Official Website
Rules for classification: 1) Points; 2) Goal difference; 3) Number of goals scored; 4) Head-to-head results; 5) Wins; 6) Away goals; 7) Penalty points (sec 9.5); 8) 12-point sending off offences

==== Results summary ====
Overall								Home						Away					
Pld	W	D	L	GF	GA	GD	Pts	W	D	L	GF	GA	GD	W	D	L	GF	GA	GD
45	14	11	20	74	80	−6	53	11	4	7	42	31	+11	3	7	13	32	49	−17

Last updated: 20 April 2024.
Source: Soccerway

==== Matches ====
On 22 June, the EFL League Two fixtures were released.

Win Draw Loss Fixtures

12 August 2023 2	Swindon Town	2–2	Crewe Alexandra	Swindon
15:00 BST	Godwin-Malife 21'; McEachran (yellow card) 26'; Young 47'; Mahoney (yellow card) 82'; Blake-Tracy (yellow card) 87'; Brewitt (yellow card) 90+6'	Report	Adebisi (yellow card) 15' (goal) 85'; Powell (yellow card) 15'; Williams (yellow card) 20' (goal) 60'; Thomas (yellow card) 23'; Long (yellow card) 67'; Davies (yellow card) 90+2'	Stadium: The County Ground; Attendance: 9,022; Referee: Scott Jackson

15 August 2023 3	Forest Green Rovers	1–2	Swindon Town	Nailsworth
19:45 BST	Omotoye (yellow card) 14'; Stevens 14'; Bunker (yellow card) 42' (yellow-red card) 61'; Kadji (yellow card) 70'; Bernard (yellow card) 72'; Daniels (yellow card) 88'	Report	Kinsella (yellow card) 26'; Blake-Tracy (yellow card) 45+4', (goal) 90+4'; Kemp 47'; Bernard (yellow card) 72'; Daniels (yellow card) 88'	Stadium: The New Lawn; Referee: Sunny Gill

19 August 2023 4	Wrexham	5–5	Swindon Town	Wrexham
15:00 BST	Bickerstaff 29'; Lee 51' (pen.) 90+6' (Dalby); Jones 55' (Lee) 90+2' (Mendy); Boyle (yellow card) 76'	Report	Young 17' (Austin) 34' (McEachran); Brewitt (yellow card) 20'; Austin 27' (Kemp); Kemp 31' (Young) (yellow card) 56' (goal) 71' (Young); Blake-Tracy (yellow card) 64'	Stadium: Racecourse Ground; Attendance: 10,258; Referee: Charles Breakspear

26 August 2023 5	Swindon Town	6–0	Crawley Town	Swindon
15:00 BST	Kemp 34'; Young 47', 51', 60', 71'; Shade 90+9'	Report	Williams (yellow card) 88'	Stadium: The County Ground; Attendance: 8,658; Referee: Jacob Miles

2 September 2023 6	Doncaster Rovers	0–0	Swindon Town	Doncaster
15:00 BST	Ironside (yellow card) 35'; Westbrooke (yellow card) 39'; Rowe (red card) 45'; Senior (yellow card) 62'; Lawlor (yellow card) 69'	Report	Khan (yellow card) 34'; Hutton (yellow card) 37'; Brewitt (yellow card) 67'; Austin (yellow card) 73'	Stadium: Keepmoat Stadium; Attendance: 6,108; Referee: Edward Duckworth

9 September 2023 7	Swindon Town	5–3	Sutton United	Swindon
15:00 BST	Young 5', 23'; Cain 16'; Kemp 65'; Godwin-Malife (yellow card) 85'; Hepburn-Murphy 87'	Report	Clay 34'; Goodliffe 39' (yellow card) 90+7'; Milsom (yellow card) 74'; Smith 77'	Stadium: The County Ground; Attendance: 8,389; Referee: Ben Atkinson

16 September 2023 8	Swindon Town	2–0	Walsall	Swindon
15:00 BST	Austin 2'; Khan (yellow card) 36'; Hepburn-Murphy 88'; Hutton (yellow card) 90+4'	Report	Hutchinson (yellow card) 25'; Knowles (yellow card) 62' (yellow-red card) 66'; Gordon (yellow card) 90+4'	Stadium: The County Ground; Attendance: 9,131; Referee: Matthew Corlett

23 September 2023 9	Morecambe	2–2	Swindon Town	Morecambe
15:00 BST	Taylor 31'; Connolly (yellow card) 33'; Songo'o (yellow card) 54' (yellow-red card) 55'; Walker 80'	Report	Kemp 12' (yellow card) 90+6'; Austin 57' (pen.); Khan (yellow card) 78'	Stadium: Mazuma Stadium; Attendance: 3,737; Referee: Scott Tallis

30 September 2023 10	Swindon Town	2–1	Grimsby Town	Swindon
15:00 BST	Kemp 26'; Blake-Tracy (yellow card) 60'; Cain 64'; Hutton (yellow card) 90+5'	Report	Clifton (yellow card) 62'; Wilson 70'; Rodgers (yellow card) 90+2'	Stadium: The County Ground; Attendance: 9,168; Referee: Andy Davies

3 October 2023 11	Notts County	3–1	Swindon Town	Nottingham
19:45 BST	McGoldrick 10'; Bostock (yellow card) 12'; Langstaff 35' (pen.); Crowley 37'; O'Brien (yellow card) 83'; Jones (yellow card) 90+1'	Report	Shade 49'; Hepburn-Murphy (yellow card) 72'	Stadium: Meadow Lane; Attendance: 9,810; Referee: Darren Drysdale

7 October 2023 12	Bradford City	1–0	Swindon Town	Bradford
15:00 BST	Pointon 50'; Walker (yellow card) 60'; Halliday (yellow card) 76'; Smallwood (yellow card) 89'	Report	Khan (yellow card) 42'; Hutton (yellow card) 65'; Austin (yellow card) 76'	Stadium: Valley Parade; Attendance: 16,788; Referee: Christopher Pollard

14 October 2023 13	Swindon Town	2–0	Newport County	Swindon
15:00 BST	Kemp 8'; Brewitt (yellow card) 36'; Hepburn-Murphy 82'	Report		Stadium: The County Ground; Attendance: 9,628; Referee: David Rock

21 October 2023 14	Salford City	2–2	Swindon Town	Kersal
15:00 BST	Ingram 7'; Watt (yellow card) 15'; Smith (yellow card) 34'; Lund (yellow card) 76'; Tilt (red card) 84'; Humbles 90+5'	Report	Hutton 11'; Brewitt (yellow card) 12'; Austin 85' (pen.)	Stadium: Moor Lane; Attendance: 2,523; Referee: Lewis Smith

24 October 2023 15	Swindon Town	0–1	Gillingham	Swindon
19:45 BST		Report	Mahoney 22'; Clarke (yellow card) 68'; Alexander (penalty missed) 74' (yellow card) 79'	Stadium: The County Ground; Attendance: 8,853; Referee: Peter Wright

28 October 2023 16	Milton Keynes Dons	3–2	Swindon Town	Milton Keynes
15:00 BST	Grant (yellow card) 27'; Dean 39'; Harvie (yellow card) 54'; O'Hora 66'; McEachran 84' (o.g.); Eisa (yellow card) 90+6'	Report	Clayton (yellow card) 29'; Khan (yellow card) 37'; McEachran (yellow card) 53'; Young 59'; Austin (yellow card) 86'; Blake-Tracy 90+4'	Stadium: Stadium MK; Attendance: 7,821; Referee: Ross Joyce

7 November 2023 1	Colchester United	3–1	Swindon Town	Colchester
19:45 GMT	Kinsella 49' (o.g.); Tovide (yellow card) 49' (goal) 64'; Chilvers 90+3'	Report	Young 23'; Kemp (yellow card) 31'; Kinsella (yellow card) 45'	Stadium: Colchester Community Stadium; Attendance: 3,455; Referee: Anthony Backhouse
Note: Fixture postponed due to a waterlogged pitch.

11 November 2023 17	Swindon Town	2–4	Stockport County	Swindon
15:00 GMT	Kemp 31'; Mahoney (yellow card) 51'; Young 61'; Khan (yellow card) 68'	Report	Sarcevic (yellow card) 17'; Wootton (yellow card) 45' (goal) 69'; Collar 52' (pen.); Bailey 73'; Camps 89'	Stadium: The County Ground; Attendance: 8,475; Referee: Sam Purkiss

18 November 2023 18	Harrogate Town	1–1	Swindon Town	Harrogate
15:00 GMT	Muldoon 66'; Dooley (yellow card) 82'	Report	Young 25'; Kinsella (yellow card) 27'; Kokolo (yellow card) 81'	Stadium: Wetherby Road; Attendance: 3,004; Referee: Jacob Miles

25 November 2023 19	Swindon Town	2–1	Mansfield Town	Swindon
15:00 GMT	Young 25', 90+3' (yellow card) 90+4'	Report	Maris (yellow card) 37'; Akins 49'	Stadium: The County Ground; Attendance: 8,322; Referee: Lee Swabey

28 November 2023 20	Accrington Stanley	3–4	Swindon Town	Accrington
19:45 GMT	Baghuelou (yellow card) 6'; McCracken (yellow card) 17'; Conneely (yellow card) 18'; Hills (yellow card) 29' (goal) 90+7', 90+10'; Longelo (yellow card) 33'; Leigh (penalty missed) 69'; Lowe (yellow card) 87'; Adeboyin 90+2'	Report	Kemp 17' (pen.) (yellow card) 25'; Young 31' (yellow card) 49'; Khan 60'; Austin 89'	Stadium: Crown Ground; Attendance: 1,997; Referee: Seb Stockbridge

9 December 2023 21	AFC Wimbledon	4–0	Swindon Town	Wimbledon
15:00 GMT	Bugiel 6'; Neufville (yellow card) 13'; Little 59'; Al Hamadi 79', 90+2' (yellow card) 90+3'	Report	Blake-Tracy (yellow card) 13'	Stadium: Plough Lane; Attendance: 8,275; Referee: Scott Oldham

16 December 2023 22	Swindon Town	0–3	Barrow	Swindon
15:00 GMT	Kinsella (yellow card) 65'	Report	Spence 34'; Foley 58'; Chester 73'; Garner (yellow card) 83'	Stadium: The County Ground; Attendance: 7,463; Referee: Craig Hicks

23 December 2023 23	Tranmere Rovers	2–1	Swindon Town	Birkenhead
15:00 GMT	Jennings (yellow card) 42'; Morris 55'; Walker (yellow card) 57'; Davies 72'	Report	Kemp 22'; Young (yellow card) 89'; Shade (yellow card) 82'; Hutton (yellow card) 90+4'	Stadium: Prenton Park; Attendance: 5,894; Referee: Sunny Sukhvir Gill

26 December 2023 24	Swindon Town	0–1	Wrexham	Swindon
15:00 GMT	Austin (yellow card) 61'	Report	McClean 13'; Jones (yellow card) 70' (yellow-red card) 74'	Stadium: The County Ground; Attendance: 12,271; Referee: Tom Reeves

29 December 2023 25	Swindon Town	2–1	Forest Green Rovers	Swindon
15:00 GMT	Kemp 56', 81'; Hutton (yellow card) 71'; Minturn (yellow card) 90+8'; Young (yellow card) 90+8'	Report	Dabo (yellow card) 15'; Jenks (yellow card) 21'; Robson (yellow card) 43'; Taylor 74'; Bendle (yellow card) 80'; Inniss (yellow card) 87'; Stevens (penalty missed) 90+9'	Stadium: The County Ground; Attendance: 9,075; Referee: Scott Simpson

1 January 2024 26	Crawley Town	3–1	Swindon Town	Crawley
15:00 GMT	Orsi 9', 53'; Roles 26'	Report	Kemp 90+2'	Stadium: Broadfield Stadium; Attendance: 3,636; Referee: Paul Howard

6 January 2024 27	Swindon Town	2–2	Colchester United	Swindon
15:00 GMT	Austin 18' (pen.); Brewitt 43'; Shade (yellow card) 74'	Report	Chilvers (yellow card) 14'; Jay 45+2'; Marshall-Miranda (yellow card) 64'; Ihionvien 90+4'	Stadium: The County Ground; Attendance: 7,564; Referee: Richie Watkins

13 January 2024 28	Crewe Alexandra	2–1	Swindon Town	Crewe
15:00 GMT	Elliott Nevitt 13' (yellow card) 90+4'; Thomas (yellow card) 56'; Baker-Richardson 71'; Rowe (yellow card) 72'	Report	Kinsella (yellow card) 17'; Minturn (yellow card) 20'; Austin 30' (yellow card) 34'	Stadium: Gresty Road; Attendance: 4,597; Referee: Leigh Doughty

27 January 2024 30	Swindon Town	2–0	Bradford City	Swindon
15:00 GMT	Austin 17' (pen.); Devoy 45+2'; Kokolo (yellow card) 45+4'; Khan (yellow card) 58'	Report	Stubbs (yellow card) 49'; Smallwood (yellow card) 55'	Stadium: The County Ground; Attendance: 7,878; Referee: Geoff Eltringham

3 February 2024 31	Newport County	2–1	Swindon Town	Newport
12:45 GMT	McLoughlin (yellow card) 3'; Bennett (yellow card) 38'; Evans 53'; Palmer-Houlden 74'	Report	Glatzel 46'; Kokolo (yellow card) 51'; Devoy (yellow card) 72'; Bycroft (yellow card) 75'; Khan (yellow card) 77'	Stadium: Rodney Parade; Attendance: 5,912; Referee: Matthew Corlett
Note: Fixture was originally given a 15:00 kick-off, but was pushed forward following a safety assessment.

10 February 2024 32	Swindon Town	1–1	Salford City	Swindon
15:00 GMT	Khan (yellow card) 24'; Glatzel (yellow card) 39'; Godwin-Malife (yellow card) 53'; McEachran 82'	Report	Hendry 90+2'	Stadium: The County Ground; Attendance: 8,272; Referee: Darren Drysdale

13 February 2024 33	Gillingham	2–2	Swindon Town	Gillingham
19:45 GMT	Dieng (yellow card) 52'; Hawkins 68'; Mahoney 79' (pen.)	Report	Sean McGurk 24'; Blake-Tracy (yellow card) 78'; McEachran (yellow card) 83'; McKirdy 90+4'	Stadium: Priestfield Stadium; Attendance: 6,096; Referee: Declan Bourne

17 February 2024 34	Swindon Town	1–2	Milton Keynes Dons	Swindon
15:00 GMT	Khan (yellow card) 45'; McKirdy (yellow card) 75'; Austin 89'	Report	Wearne 4', 8'; Bate (yellow card) 29'	Stadium: The County Ground

24 February 2024 35	Stockport County	0–0	Swindon Town	Edgeley
15:00 GMT		Report	Kokolo (yellow card) 90+5'; McKirdy (yellow card) 90+7'	Stadium: Edgeley Park; Attendance: 9,389; Referee: Carl Brook

27 February 2024 29	Swindon Town	3–1	Tranmere Rovers	Swindon
19:45 GMT	McGurk 23'; Hepburn-Murphy 35', 64'; McCarthy (yellow card) 39'; Devoy (yellow card) 61'	Report	Apter 25'; Merrie (yellow card) 90+2'	Stadium: The County Ground; Attendance: 7,245; Referee: Martin Woods
Note: Fixture was originally scheduled for 20 January, but was postponed due to a frozen pitch.

2 March 2024 36	Swindon Town	1–1	Harrogate Town	Swindon
15:00 GMT	Austin 85'; Devoy (yellow card) 88'	Report	O'Connor 52'; Cornelius (yellow card) 55'	Stadium: The County Ground; Attendance: 7,687; Referee: Leigh Doughty

9 March 2024 37	Mansfield Town	3–2	Swindon Town	Mansfield
15:00 GMT	Akins 4' (yellow card) 61'; Keillor-Dunn 51'; Swan 67'	Report	McCarthy (yellow card) 41'; Glatzel 50'; Drinan 59'	Stadium: Field Mill; Attendance: 7,257; Referee: David Rock

12 March 2024 38	Swindon Town	1–2	Accrington Stanley	Swindon
19:45 GMT	McEachran (yellow card) 30'; Drinan 47'	Report	Leigh (yellow card) 14'; Nolan 57' (pen.); Henderson 82'; Mellor (yellow card) 90'	Stadium: The County Ground; Attendance: 6,085; Referee: Thomas Parsons

16 March 2024 39	Swindon Town	1–2	Doncaster Rovers	Swindon
15:00 GMT	Brewitt (yellow card) 12'; McEachran (yellow card) 30'; Devoy (yellow card) 44'; Glatzel 46'	Report	Biamou 10'; Adelakun 26'; Senior (yellow card) 50'; Lo-Tutala (yellow card) 79'; Olowu (yellow card) 84'	Stadium: The County Ground; Attendance: 7,419; Referee: Farai Hallam

29 March 2024 41	Swindon Town	2–1	Notts County	Swindon
15:00 GMT	Drinan 19'; Aguiar (yellow card) 23'; Kokolo (yellow card) 72'; Glatzel 73'; Blake-Tracy (yellow card) 90+1'	Report	Jatta 90+2'	Stadium: The County Ground; Attendance: 8,339; Referee: James Durkin

1 April 2024 42	Sutton United	3–1	Swindon Town	Sutton
15:00 GMT	Lakin 9'; Bycroft 48' (o.g.); Sowunmi (yellow card) 67'; Smith 70'; Patrick (yellow card) 81'	Report	Brewitt (yellow card) 25'; Glatzel 90+3'	Stadium: Gander Green Lane; Attendance: 3,630; Referee: Thomas Kirk

6 April 2024 43	Barrow	0–2	Swindon Town	Barrow-in-Furness
15:00 BST	Gotts (yellow card) 51'; Ray (yellow card) 53'; Newby (yellow card) 82'	Report	Kokolo 35' (yellow card) 60'; Drinan (yellow card) 43'; Glatzel 45'	Stadium: Holker Street; Attendance: 3,502; Referee: Ben Toner

13 April 2024 44	Swindon Town	3–2	AFC Wimbledon	Swindon
15:00 GMT	Drinan 51'; Godwin-Malife (yellow card) 60' (yellow-red card) 90+1'; Devoy 71', 84', (yellow card) 90+7'	Report	Lewis 2', 87'	Stadium: The County Ground; Attendance: 8,511; Referee: Ollie Yates

16 April 2024 40	Walsall	2–1	Swindon Town	Bescot
19:45 BST	Faal 11'; Stirk (yellow card) 87'; Johnson 89'	Report	Glatzel 68'	Stadium: Bescot Stadium; Attendance: 4,709; Referee: Matthew Corlett
Note: Fixture was originally scheduled for 23 March, but was postponed due to international call-ups within the Walsall squad.

20 April 2024 45	Grimsby Town	2–0	Swindon Town	Cleethorpes
15:00 BST	Holohan (yellow card) 69'; Smith 75'; Wilson 85'	Report		Stadium: Blundell Park; Attendance: 6,752; Referee: Martin Coy

27 April 2024 46	Swindon Town	3–3	Morecambe	Swindon
15:00 GMT	Austin 5', 35'; McCarthy (yellow card) 46'; Kokolo 74'	Report	Adams 15'; Fairclough 21'; Smith 86'	Stadium: The County Ground; Attendance: 8,859; Referee: Craig Hicks

=== FA Cup ===
Town were drawn at home to Aldershot Town in the first round.

Win Draw Loss Fixtures

4 November 2023 First Round	Swindon Town	4–7	Aldershot Town	Swindon
15:00 GMT	Godwin-Malife (yellow card) 71'; Kemp 75', 78'; Austin 90+2', 90+5'	Report	Barham 1', 4', 58' (yellow card) 59'; Stokes 9'; Widdrington (yellow card) 37'; Tolaj 45+3', 51'; Harries 47' (pen.); Frost (yellow card) 76'	Stadium: County Ground; Attendance: 6,372; Referee: Carl Brook

=== EFL Cup ===
Swindon were drawn away to Peterborough United in the first round.

Win Draw Loss Fixtures

8 August 2023 First round	Peterborough United	1–1 (4–1 p)	Swindon Town	Peterborough
19:30 BST	Randall 7'; Kyprianou (yellow card) 41'	Report	Blake-Tracy (yellow card) 45+2'; Hepburn-Murphy 49'	Stadium: London Road Stadium; Attendance: 3,440; Referee: Tom Nield
	Penalties
	Clarke-Harris (penalty scored); Edwards (penalty scored); Tomlinson (penalty scored); Burrows (penalty scored)		(penalty missed) Blake-Tracy; (penalty scored) Kemp; (penalty missed) Young

=== EFL Trophy ===
In the group stage, Swindon were drawn into Southern Group G alongside Exeter City, Reading and Arsenal U21.

Pos	Div	Team	Pld	W	PW	PL	L	GF	GA	GD	Pts	Qualification
1	L1	Reading	3	3	0	0	0	19	2	+17	9	Advance to Round 2
2	ACA	Arsenal U21	3	1	1	0	1	9	7	+2	5	Advance to Round 2
3	L1	Exeter City	3	1	0	0	2	1	14	−13	3	
4	L2	Swindon Town	3	0	0	1	2	2	8	−6	1	

Updated to match(es) played on 14 November 2023. Source: EFL.com

Win Draw Loss Fixtures

22 August 2023 Group stage	Swindon Town	2–2 (4–5 p)	Arsenal U21	Swindon
19:00 BST	Walters 6' (o.g.); Uwakwe 34'; Brown (yellow card) 36'; Ward (yellow card) 55'	Report	Sousa 11'; Ibrahim (yellow card) 59'; Gower 82'	Stadium: County Ground; Attendance: 3,352; Referee: Lee Swabey
	Penalties
	Cain (penalty scored); Wakeling (penalty scored); Shade (penalty scored); Ward (penalty missed); Genesini (penalty scored)		Flores (penalty scored); Cozier-Duberry (penalty scored); Edwards (penalty scored); Nwaneri (penalty scored); Sweet (penalty scored)

10 October 2023 Group stage	Reading	5–0	Swindon Town	Reading
19:00 BST (UTC+1)	Knibbs 19', 45+2', 49' (pen.) (yellow card) 39'; Craig (yellow card) 23'; Holmes (yellow card) 27'; Mukairu 90+4'; Dean 90+5'	Report	Shade (yellow card) 31'; Hutt (yellow card) 90+3'	Stadium: Madejski Stadium; Attendance: 6,121; Referee: Ali Ajibola

21 November 2023 Group stage	Swindon Town	0–1	Exeter City	Swindon
19:00 GMT		Report	Minturn 6' (o.g.); Diabate (yellow card) 82'; Harper (yellow card) 83'	Stadium: County Ground; Attendance: 644; Referee: Ollie Yates

== Statistics ==
As of 1 May 2024

No.	Pos.	Name	League		FA Cup		EFL Cup		EFL Trophy		Total		Discipline	
No.	Pos.	Name	Apps	Goals	Apps	Goals	Apps	Goals	Apps	Goals	Apps	Goals	Yellow card	Red card
1	GK	(England) Jack Bycroft	19+0	0	0+0	0	0+0	0	0+0	0	19+0	0	1	0
3	DF	(England) Pharrell Johnson	0+1	0	0+0	0	0+0	0	0+0	0	0+1	0	0	0
4	DF	(Scotland) Tom Clayton	1+2	0	0+1	0	0+0	0	0+0	0	1+3	0	1	0
5	MF	(England) Frazer Blake-Tracy	38+1	2	1+0	0	1+0	0	0+0	0	40+1	2	9	0
6	DF	(England) George McEachran	31+8	1	1+0	0	0+0	0	2+0	0	34+8	1	5	0
7	MF	(Republic of Ireland) Zack Elbouzedi	7+10	0	0+0	0	0+0	0	0+0	0	7+10	0	0	0
8	MF	(The Gambia) Saidou Khan	31+0	1	1+0	0	1+0	0	0+0	0	33+0	1	10	0
9	FW	(Germany) Paul Glatzel	18+1	7	0+0	0	0+0	0	0+0	0	18+1	7	1	0
10	FW	(England) Harry McKirdy	1+8	1	0+0	0	0+0	0	0+0	0	1+8	0	2	0
11	FW	(England) Rushian Hepburn-Murphy	9+18	5	0+0	0	1+0	1	0+0	0	10+18	6	1	0
12	FW	(England) Tom Brewitt	22+9	1	1+0	0	1+0	0	0+0	0	24+9	1	7	0
15	MF	(England) Sean McGurk	7+2	2	0+0	0	0+0	0	0+0	0	7+2	2	0	0
16	MF	(England) Jake Cain	11+13	2	0+0	0	0+0	0	1+0	0	12+13	2	0	0
17	DF	(France) Williams Kokolo	26+2	2	0+0	0	0+0	0	1+0	0	27+2	2	6	0
18	DF	(England) Reece Devine	0+0	0	0+0	0	0+0	0	0+0	0	0+0	0	0	0
19	DF	(England) Tariq Uwakwe	7+1	0	0+0	0	1+0	0	2+1	1	10+1	1	0	0
20	MF	(Republic of Ireland) Dawson Devoy	14+2	3	0+0	0	0+0	0	0+0	0	14+2	3	5	0
22	DF	(England) Udoka Godwin-Malife	41+1	1	1+0	0	1+0	0	0+0	0	43+1	1	5	1
23	FW	(Republic of Ireland) Aaron Drinan	10+7	4	0+0	0	0+0	0	0+0	0	10+7	3	1	0
24	DF	(Republic of Ireland) Conor McCarthy	17+1	0	0+0	0	0+0	0	0+0	0	17+1	0	3	0
25	GK	(England) Conor Brann	0+0	0	0+0	0	0+0	0	0+0	0	0+0	0	0	0
29	MF	(England) Ricky Aguiar	5+4	0	0+0	0	0+0	0	0+0	0	5+4	0	1	0
31	DF	(England) Harrison Minturn	14+6	0	1+0	0	0+1	0	3+0	0	18+7	0	2	0
32	FW	(England) Charlie Austin (c)	35+11	12	1+0	2	1+0	0	0+0	0	37+11	14	5	0
33	MF	(England) Joel McGregor	3+2	0	0+0	0	0+0	0	1+0	0	4+2	0	0	0
35	MF	(England) Jaxon Brown	0+1	0	0+0	0	0+0	0	1+1	0	1+2	0	0	0
38	FW	(England) Abu Kanu	0+0	0	0+0	0	0+0	0	1+0	0	1+0	0	0	0
39	MF	(England) Kian Larkins	0+0	0	0+0	0	0+0	0	0+0	0	0+0	0	0	0
40	DF	(England) Harley Hunt	2+1	0	0+0	0	0+0	0	0+0	0	2+1	0	0	0
41	FW	(England) Miles Obodo	0+4	0	0+0	0	0+0	0	2+1	0	2+5	0	0	0
46	MF	(England) Harry Gray	0+0	0	0+1	0	0+0	0	0+1	0	0+2	0	0	0
47	GK	(England) Redman Evans	0+1	0	0+0	0	0+0	0	0+1	0	0+2	0	0	0
48	MF	(England) George Alston	0+0	0	0+0	0	0+0	0	0+1	0	0+1	0	0	0
49	DF	(England) Liam Hutt	0+0	0	0+0	0	0+0	0	0+1	0	0+1	0	1	0
59	MF	(Nigeria) Nnamdi Ofoborh	6+1	0	0+0	0	0+0	0	0+1	0	6+1	0	0	0
Own goals			—	0	—	0	—	0	—	0	—	1	N/A	
Players away on loan:
14	DF	(England) Brooklyn Genesini	2+3	0	0+0	0	0+1	0	3+0	0	5+4	0	0	0
26	MF	(England) Anton Dworzak	0+4	0	0+0	0	0+0	0	2+1	0	2+5	0	0	0
27	FW	(England) Tomi Adeloye	0+0	0	0+0	0	0+0	0	0+0	0	0+0	0	0	0
28	MF	(Saint Kitts and Nevis) Tyrese Shade	12+12	2	1+0	0	0+0	0	1+1	0	14+13	2	4	0
34	MF	(England) Archie Milne	0+0	0	0+0	0	0+0	0	0+0	0	0+0	0	0	0
36	DF	(England) Sonny Hart	0+1	0	0+1	0	0+0	0	3+0	0	3+2	0	0	0
37	DF	(England) Harvey Fox	0+0	0	0+0	0	0+0	0	0+1	0	0+1	0	0	0
42	MF	(England) Josh Keyes	0+0	0	0+0	0	0+0	0	0+2	0	0+2	0	0	0
43	MF	(England) Fletcher Hubbard	0+1	0	0+1	0	0+0	0	1+1	0	1+3	0	0	0
45	DF	(England) Finn Adams	0+0	0	0+0	0	0+0	0	1+1	0	1+1	0	0	0
Players who appeared for Swindon but left during the season:
1	GK	(England) Murphy Mahoney	23+0	0	1+0	0	1+0	0	0+0	0	25+0	0	2	0
2	DF	(Burundi) Remeao Hutton	27+0	1	1+0	0	1+0	0	0+0	0	29+0	1	6	0
3	DF	(England) Benn Ward	1+2	0	0+0	0	0+1	0	1+0	0	2+3	0	1	0
7	FW	(England) Jake Young	22+3	16	0+0	0	0+1	0	0+0	0	22+4	0	4	0
10	DF	(England) Dan Kemp	25+0	14	1+0	2	1+0	0	0+0	0	27+0	16	4	0
23	DF	(Republic of Ireland) Liam Kinsella	14+8	0	0+1	0	1+0	0	3+0	0	18+9	0	5	0
24	FW	(England) Jake Wakeling	1+1	0	0+0	0	0+1	0	1+0	0	2+2	0	0	0
44	GK	(England) Lewis Ward	4+1	0	0+0	0	0+0	0	3+0	0	7+1	0	0	0
