= Abu Kanu =

Abu Kanu may refer to:

- Abu Kanu (footballer, born 1972), Sierra Leonean footballer
- Abu Kanu (footballer, born 2006), English footballer
