= Pharrell Johnson =

English footballer (born 2004)

Personal information
- Full name: Pharrell Junior Johnson
- Date of birth: 19 May 2004 (age 22)
- Position: Defender

Team information
- Current team: Ilkeston Town

Youth career
- –2024: Nottingham Forest

Senior career*
Years	Team	Apps	(Gls)
2024–2025	Swindon Town	1	(0)
2024	→ Truro City (loan)	0	(0)
- * Club domestic league appearances and goals as of 19:48, 29 January 2024 (UTC)

Pharrell Junior Johnson (born 19 May 2004) is an English professional footballer who plays as a defender for Ilkeston Town.

== Career ==
Johnson began his career with Nottingham Forest, signing for Swindon Town in January 2024.

He was loaned to Truro City for the 2024-25 season.

On 9 May 2025, Swindon announced that Johnson would be leaving in June when his contract expired.

Johnson joined Ilkeston Town for the 2026-27 season.

== Career statistics ==
As of match played 10 February 2024

Appearances and goals by club, season and competition
Club	Season	League			FA Cup		EFL Cup		Other		Total	
Club	Season	Division	Apps	Goals	Apps	Goals	Apps	Goals	Apps	Goals	Apps	Goals
Swindon Town	2023–24	League Two	1	0	0	0	0	0	2 (Note: Appearances in EFL Trophy)	0	3	0
Swindon Town	2024–25	League Two	0	0	0	0	0	0	0	0	0	0
Swindon Town	Total		1	0	0	0	0	0	2	0	3	0
Truro City (loan)	2024–25	National League South	0	0	0	0	–		0	0	0	0
Career total			1	0	0	0	0	0	2	0	3	0
