= Sean McGurk =

English footballer (born 2003)

Personal information
- Date of birth: 15 March 2003 (age 23)
- Place of birth: Liverpool, England
- Position: Winger

Team information
- Current team: South Shields

Youth career
- Liverpool
- 2017–2021: Wigan Athletic
- 2021–2024: Leeds United

Senior career*
Years	Team	Apps	(Gls)
2024–2025	Swindon Town	17	(2)
2024–2025	→ Yeovil Town (loan)	10	(2)
2025–	South Shields	32	(5)
- * Club domestic league appearances and goals as of 20:58, 15 August 2026 (UTC)

Sean McGurk (born 15 March 2003) is an English professional footballer who plays as a winger for South Shields.

== Career ==
Born in Liverpool, McGurk began his career with Liverpool, signing for Wigan Athletic at under-14 level. He moved to Leeds United in July 2021, signing a three-year contract. He was a regular for the Leeds youth teams.

McGurk signed for Swindon Town in February 2024, saying he was looking forward to first-team football. He was offered a new contract by Swindon at the end of the 2023–24 season. On 10 June 2024, he signed a new contract.

On 24 December 2024, McGurk joined National League side Yeovil Town on a one-month loan deal.

On 9 May 2025, Swindon announced the player would be leaving in June when his contract expired.

In July 2025 he signed for South Shields.

== Career statistics ==
As of end of 2024–25 season

Appearances and goals by club, season and competition
Club	Season	League			FA Cup		League Cup		Other		Total	
Club	Season	Division	Apps	Goals	Apps	Goals	Apps	Goals	Apps	Goals	Apps	Goals
Leeds United U21	2021–22	—			—		—		3 (Note: Appearance(s) in EFL Trophy)	0	3	0
Leeds United U21	2022–23	—			—		—		1	0	1	0
Leeds United U21	Total		—		—		—		4	0	4	0
Swindon Town	2023–24	League Two	9	2	0	0	0	0	0	0	9	2
Swindon Town	2024–25	League Two	8	0	0	0	0	0	3	1	11	1
Swindon Town	Total		17	2	0	0	0	0	3	1	20	3
Yeovil Town (loan)	2024–25	National League	10	2	—		—		—		10	2
Career total			27	4	0	0	0	0	7	1	34	5
