= Miles Obodo =

English association football player

Personal information
- Full name: Miles Szymon Odafe Obodo
- Date of birth: 16 February 2007 (age 19)
- Place of birth: Basingstoke, England
- Height: 1.82 m (6 ft 0 in)
- Position: Forward

Team information
- Current team: Farnham Town
- Number: 19

Youth career
- –2023: Swindon Town

Senior career*
Years	Team	Apps	(Gls)
2023–2025	Swindon Town	4	(0)
2025	→ Marlow (loan)	8	(0)
2025–2026	Reading	0	(0)
2025–2026	→ Chichester City (loan)	20	(7)
2026–	Farnham Town	7	(1)
2026	→ Basingstoke Town (loan)	8	(4)
- * Club domestic league appearances and goals as of 14:24, 20 November 2026 (UTC)

Miles Szymon Odafe Obodo is an English professional footballer who plays as a forward for National League South club Farnham Town.

== Career ==
Obodo joined Swindon Town at 14 years old and made his Football League debut during a 1–0 away defeat to Bradford City, replacing Saidou Khan with 13 minutes remaining. He featured a further 5 times from then making three starts in the EFL trophy.

On 4 August 2025, Obodo joined League One club Reading, signing a one-year deal with an option to extend with the club's Under-21s. In December 2025, he joined Isthmian League Premier Division club Chichester City on a one-month loan, scoring his first goal for the club in a 1–0 win over Hashtag United.

On 11 May 2026, Reading announced that Obodo would be released from the club at the end of his contract in June 2026. That same day, it was announced that Obodo would join Farnham Town ahead of the 2026–27 campaign. On 7 August 2026, Obodo joined Southern League Premier Division South side, Basingstoke Town on a 28-day loan. After scoring three goals in his first six appearances at Basingstoke Town, Obodo's loan was extended for a further 28 days on 4 September 2026. On 28 September 2026, Farnham Town exercised their option to recall Obodo from Basingstoke Town, having made 11 appearances and scored four goals during his loan spell.

== Career statistics ==
As of match played 7 November 2026

Appearances and goals by club, season and competition
Club	Season	League			FA Cup		League Cup		Other		Total	
Club	Season	Division	Apps	Goals	Apps	Goals	Apps	Goals	Apps	Goals	Apps	Goals
Swindon Town	2023–24	League Two	4	0	0	0	0	0	3 (Note: Appearances in the EFL Trophy)	0	7	0
Swindon Town	2024–25	League Two	0	0	0	0	0	0	1	0	1	0
Swindon Town	Total		4	0	0	0	0	0	4	0	8	0
Marlow (loan)	2024–25	Southern League Premier Division South	8	0	—		—		—		8	0
Reading	2025–26	League One	0	0	0	0	0	0	0	0	0	0
Chichester City (loan)	2025–26	Isthmian League Premier Division	20	7	—		—		—		20	7
Farnham Town	2026–27	National League South	7	1	—		—		—		7	1
Basingstoke Town (loan)	2026–27	Southern League Premier Division South	8	4	2	0	—		1 (Note: Appearance in the FA Trophy)	0	11	4
Career total			47	12	2	0	0	0	5	0	54	12
