= Anton Dworzak =

English association football player

Personal information
- Full name: Anton Gabriel Ryan Dworzak
- Date of birth: 3 March 2005 (age 21)
- Height: 5 ft 3 in (1.61 m)
- Position: Midfielder

Team information
- Current team: Swindon Supermarine (on loan from Swindon Town)

Youth career
- Procision Football Academy
- –2021: Swindon Town

Senior career*
Years	Team	Apps	(Gls)
2021–2025	Swindon Town	5	(0)
2022	→ Highworth Town (loan)	4	(1)
2023	→ Gloucester City (loan)	0	(0)
2023	→ North Leigh (loan)	2	(0)
2024	→ Hemel Hempstead Town (loan)	8	(0)
2024–	→ Swindon Supermarine (loan)	29	(2)
- * Club domestic league appearances and goals as of 19:10, 23 April 2025 (UTC)

Anton Gabriel Ryan Dworzak (born 3 March 2005) is an English professional footballer who plays as a midfielder.

== Career ==
Prior to his move to Swindon Town, Dworzak played for Procision Football Academy, similarly to team-mates, George Cowmeadow and Callum Winchcombe. He made his first-team debut during an EFL Trophy second round tie in November 2021 against Colchester United, replacing Harrison Minturn in the 89th minute as the Robins fell to a 2–1 defeat.

In November 2022, Dworzak and Town teammate Harvey Fox joined Highworth Town on loan. Both made their debuts in the 2-0 win at Biggleswade with Dworzak scoring the second goal.

Dworzak returned to Swindon in December and made his senior league debut as a second half sub during the 1-0 away win against Barrow.

In July 2023, Dworzak joined Gloucester City on a two-month loan.

Dworzak then joined North Leigh on loan.

In February 2024, Dworzak signed a third loan deal for the season at Hemel Hempstead Town. He made his debut two days later in a 2-0 loss to Havant & Waterlooville.

On 19 August 2024, Dworzak signed for Swindon Supermarine on an initial one-month loan. He scored his first goal for two years against Hungerford Town in a 2-0 win.

On 9 May 2025, Swindon announced the player would be leaving in June when his contract expired.

== Career statistics ==
As of match played 5 April 2025

Appearances and goals by club, season and competition
Club	Season	League			FA Cup		League Cup		Other		Total	
Club	Season	Division	Apps	Goals	Apps	Goals	Apps	Goals	Apps	Goals	Apps	Goals
Swindon Town	2021–22	League Two	0	0	0	0	0	0	1 (Note: Appearances in the EFL Trophy)	0	1	0
Swindon Town	2022–23	League Two	1	0	0	0	1	0	2	0	4	0
Swindon Town	2023–24	League Two	4	0	0	0	0	0	3	0	7	0
Swindon Town	Total		5	0	0	0	1	0	6	0	12	0
Highworth Town (loan)	2022–23	Southern League Division One Central	4	1	—		—		—		4	1
Gloucester City (loan)	2023–24	National League North	0	0	0	0	0	0	0	0	0	0
North Leigh (loan)	2023–24	Southern League Division One Central	2	0	0	0	0	0	1 (Note: Appearances in the FA Trophy)	0	3	0
Hemel Hempstead Town (loan)	2023–24	National League South	8	0	0	0	0	0	0	0	8	0
Swindon Supermarine (loan)	2024–25	Southern League Premier Division South	29	2	2	0	0	0	3 (Note: 2 appearances and 1 goal in Wiltshire Premier Shield, 1 appearance in FA Trophy)	1	34	3
Career total			48	3	2	0	1	0	10	1	61	4
