= Jake Cain =

English footballer (born 2001)

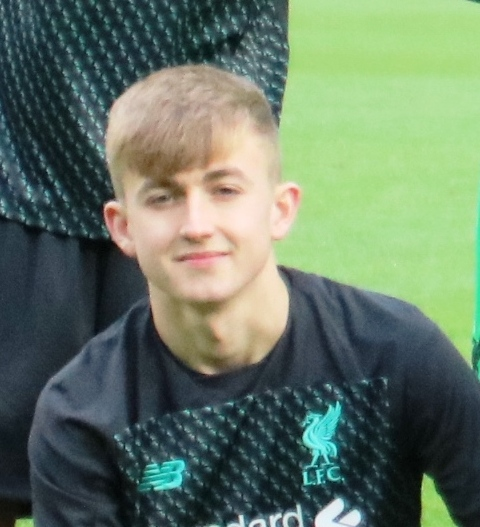
- Cain in 2019

Personal information
- Full name: Jake Steven Cain
- Date of birth: 2 September 2001 (age 25)
- Place of birth: Wigan, England
- Height: 1.76 m (5 ft 9 in)
- Position: Midfielder

Team information
- Current team: Morecambe
- Number: 20

Youth career
- 2010–2023: Liverpool

Senior career*
Years	Team	Apps	(Gls)
2020–2023	Liverpool	0	(0)
2021–2022	→ Newport County (loan)	25	(0)
2023–2025	Swindon Town	59	(3)
2025–	Morecambe	35	(2)
- * Club domestic league appearances and goals as of 00:31, 19 April 2025 (UTC)

Jake Steven Cain (born 2 September 2001) is an English professional footballer who plays as a midfielder for Morecambe.

He signed his first professional contract with Liverpool F.C. in September 2019 and made his senior Liverpool debut on 4 February 2020 in the FA Cup fourth-round replay against Shrewsbury Town which they won 1–0. He joined Swindon in January 2023, signing a two-and-a-half-year contract.

== Career ==
=== Liverpool ===
Cain made his first-team debut on 4 February 2020, in the FA Cup fourth round replay against Shrewsbury Town. On 29 September 2020, Cain scored his first senior goal in a 3–2 EFL Trophy defeat to Tranmere Rovers, scoring an impressive thirty-yard free kick.

==== Newport County (loan) ====
On 31 August 2021, Cain joined League Two side Newport County on loan for the 2021–22 season. He made his debut for Newport the same day in the starting line-up for the 2–0 win against Plymouth Argyle in the EFL Trophy. He made his football league debut for Newport on 14 September 2021 in starting line-up for the 1-0 League Two defeat against Northampton Town.

=== Swindon Town ===
He joined Swindon on 16 January 2023 signing a two-and-a-half-year contract with the Wiltshire club. He made his first league start for Swindon on 4 February 2023 against Newport County, that also marked the first league match in charge of Swindon for new manager Jody Morris. Cain scored his first league goal on 8 May 2023, in a 2–1 win against Crawley Town. He was released by Swindon at the end of the 2024-25 season.

=== Morecambe ===
Cain joined Morecambe on 21 August 2025.

== Career statistics ==
=== Club ===
As of end of 2024-25 season

Appearances and goals by club, season and competition
Club	Season	League			FA Cup		EFL Cup		Europe		Other		Total	
Club	Season	Division	Apps	Goals	Apps	Goals	Apps	Goals	Apps	Goals	Apps	Goals	Apps	Goals
Liverpool	2019–20	Premier League	0	0	1	0	0	0	0	0	0	0	1	0
Liverpool	2020–21	Premier League	0	0	0	0	0	0	0	0	0	0	0	0
Liverpool	2021–22	Premier League	0	0	0	0	0	0	0	0	0	0	0	0
Liverpool	Total		0	0	1	0	0	0	0	0	0	0	1	0
Liverpool U23	2019–20	—			—		—		—		2 (Note: Appearance(s) in EFL Trophy)	0	2	0
Liverpool U23	2020–21	—			—		—		—		3	1	3	1
Liverpool U23	2022–23	—			—		—		—		2	0	2	0
Liverpool U23	Total				—		—		—		7	1	7	1
Newport County (loan)	2021–22	EFL League Two	25	0	1	0	0	0	—		2	0	28	0
Swindon Town	2022–23	EFL League Two	16	1	0	0	0	0	—		0	0	16	1
Swindon Town	2023–24	EFL League Two	24	2	0	0	0	0	—		1	0	25	2
Swindon Town	2024–25	EFL League Two	19	0	0	0	1	0	—		5	0	25	0
Swindon Town	Total		59	3	0	0	1	0	0	0	6	0	66	3
Morecambe	2025–26	National League	0	0	0	0	0	0	—		0	0	0	0
Total			84	3	2	0	1	0	0	0	15	1	102	4

== Honours ==
Liverpool

- FA Youth Cup: 2018–19
