= Liam Hutt =

English association football player

Personal information
- Position: Defender

Team information
- Current team: Evesham United

Youth career
- –2023: Swindon Town

Senior career*
Years	Team	Apps	(Gls)
2023–2025	Swindon Town	0	(0)
2025	→ Weymouth (loan)	5	(0)
2026–	Evesham United		
- * Club domestic league appearances and goals as of 17:45, 23 April 2025 (UTC)

Liam Hutt is an English professional footballer who plays as a defender for Southern Football League club Evesham United.

== Career ==
Hutt started his career with Swindon Town and made his debut during an away defeat to Reading in the EFL Trophy group stage. In March 2025, he joined Weymouth on loan in the National League South.

He was released by Swindon Town in May 2025. He then joined Southern Football League side Evesham United for the 2025-26 season, and remained at the club for the following 2026-27 campaign.

== Career statistics ==
As of match played 29 March 2025

Appearances and goals by club, season and competition
Club	Season	League			FA Cup		League Cup		Other		Total	
Club	Season	Division	Apps	Goals	Apps	Goals	Apps	Goals	Apps	Goals	Apps	Goals
Swindon Town	2023–24	League Two	0	0	0	0	0	0	1 (Note: Appearance in the EFL Trophy)	0	1	0
Swindon Town	2024–25	League Two	0	0	0	0	0	0	0	0	0	0
Swindon Town	Total		0	0	0	0	0	0	1	0	1	0
Weymouth (loan)	2024–25	National League South	5	0	0	0	–		0	0	5	0
Career total			5	0	0	0	0	0	1	0	6	0
