= Harrison Minturn =

English association football player

Personal information
- Full name: Harrison James Minturn
- Date of birth: 26 December 2003 (age 22)
- Place of birth: Swindon, England
- Height: 1.88 m (6 ft 2 in)
- Position: Defender

Team information
- Current team: Bath City
- Number: 15

Youth career
- –2022: Swindon Town

Senior career*
Years	Team	Apps	(Gls)
2021–2026	Swindon Town	36	(0)
2022	→ Chippenham Town (loan)	9	(1)
2022	→ Gloucester City (loan)	3	(0)
2022	→ Chippenham Town (loan)	7	(0)
2025	→ Chippenham Town (loan)	2	(0)
2026–	Bath City	2	(0)
- * Club domestic league appearances and goals as of 13:35, 6 September 2026 (UTC)

Harrison James Minturn (born 26 December 2003) is an English professional footballer who plays as a defender for Southern League Premier Division South club Bath City.

== Career ==
=== Swindon Town ===
Minturn started his career with Swindon Town, making his first-team debut in November 2021 during an EFL Trophy group-stage tie against Newport County, playing the full 90 minutes in the 1–0 victory.

In early 2022, Minturn joined Chippenham Town on loan but was recalled in March. Later that month Minturn signed his first professional contract with Swindon. In September 2022, Minturn joined National League North club Gloucester City on a one-month loan deal. Following the end of this loan spell, Minturn returned for a second loan spell at Chippenham Town. In December 2022, Minturn returned to Swindon and was on the bench for their 1-0 league win at Barrow. He made his league debut for Swindon as a substitute in a 3-3 draw with Gillingham in January 2023.

In August 2025, Minturn returned to National League South club Chippenham Town on a one-month loan deal. Just two games into this loan spell, he suffered a ruptured anterior cruciate ligament, undergoing surgery that would rule him out until the end of the season.

With his contract having expired at the end of the 2025–26 season, Minturn was invited back to join the club for pre-season, however he did not return to the club.

=== Bath City ===
On 7 August 2026, Minturn joined Southern League Premier Division South club Bath City.

== Career statistics ==
As of match played 5 September 2026

Appearances and goals by club, season and competition
Club	Season	League			FA Cup		League Cup		Other		Total	
Club	Season	Division	Apps	Goals	Apps	Goals	Apps	Goals	Apps	Goals	Apps	Goals
Swindon Town	2021–22	League Two	0	0	0	0	0	0	2 (Note: Appearances in EFL Trophy)	0	2	0
Swindon Town	2022–23	League Two	8	0	—		1	0	2	0	11	0
Swindon Town	2023–24	League Two	20	0	1	0	1	0	3	0	25	0
Swindon Town	2024–25	League Two	8	0	2	0	1	0	2	0	13	0
Swindon Town	2025–26	League Two	0	0	0	0	0	0	0	0	0	0
Swindon Town	Total		36	0	3	0	3	0	9	0	51	0
Chippenham Town (loan)	2021–22	National League South	9	1	—		—		—		9	1
Gloucester City (loan)	2022–23	National League North	3	0	—		—		—		3	0
Chippenham Town (loan)	2022–23	National League South	7	0	2	0	—		1 (Note: Appearance in FA Trophy)	0	10	0
Chippenham Town (loan)	2025–26	National League South	2	0	—		—		—		2	0
Bath City	2026–27	Southern League; Premier Division South	2	0	1	0	—		0	0	3	0
Career total			59	1	6	0	3	0	10	0	78	1

== Honours ==
Individual

- Swindon Town Young Player of the Season: 2023–24
