= Harvey Fox =

English association football player

Personal information
- Full name: Harvey James Fox
- Date of birth: 24 September 2004 (age 22)
- Position: Defender

Team information
- Current team: Swindon Town
- Number: 37

Youth career
- –2021: Swindon Town

Senior career*
Years	Team	Apps	(Gls)
2021–	Swindon Town	0	(0)
2022–2023	→ Highworth Town (loan)	21	(0)
2023	→ Swindon Supermarine (loan)	1	(0)
2023	→ North Leigh (loan)	4	(1)
- * Club domestic league appearances and goals as of 20:43, 22 November 2023 (UTC)

Harvey Fox (born 24 September 2004) is an English professional footballer who plays as a defender for League Two club Swindon Town.

== Career ==
Fox started his career with Swindon Town and made his first-team debut during an EFL Trophy second round tie in November 2021 against Colchester United, replacing Harry McKirdy in the 63rd minute as the Robins fell to a 2–1 defeat.

In November 2022, Fox and Town teammate Anton Dworzak joined Highworth Town on loan. Both made their debuts in the 2–0 win at Biggleswade.

Following a spell with Swindon Supermarine, Fox joined North Leigh on a short-term loan in September 2023.

== Career statistics ==
As of match played 21 November 2023

Appearances and goals by club, season and competition
Club	Season	League			FA Cup		League Cup		Other		Total	
Club	Season	Division	Apps	Goals	Apps	Goals	Apps	Goals	Apps	Goals	Apps	Goals
Swindon Town	2021–22	League Two	0	0	0	0	0	0	1 (Note: Appearances in the EFL Trophy)	0	1	0
Swindon Town	2022–23	League Two	0	0	0	0	0	0	2	0	2	0
Swindon Town	2023–24	League Two	0	0	0	0	0	0	1	0	1	0
Swindon Town	Total		0	0	0	0	0	0	4	0	4	0
Highworth Town (loan)	2022–23	Southern League Division One Central	21	0	—		—		1 (Note: Appearance in the Southern League inter-step play-offs)	0	22	0
Swindon Supermarine (loan)	2023–24	Southern League Premier Division South	1	0	0	0	—		0	0	1	0
North Leigh (loan)	2023–24	Southern League Division One Central	4	1	—		—		0	0	4	1
Career total			26	1	0	0	0	0	5	0	31	1
