= Josh Keyes (footballer) =

English footballer (born 2006)

Personal information
- Full name: Joshua Brendan Keyes
- Date of birth: 26 April 2006 (age 20)
- Position: Midfielder

Team information
- Current team: Gloucester City
- Number: 18

Youth career
- –2023: Swindon Town

Senior career*
Years	Team	Apps	(Gls)
2023–2024	Swindon Town	0	(0)
2024	→ Cirencester Town (loan)	5	(1)
2024–2026	Watford	0	(0)
2025	→ Potters Bar Town (loan)	3	(0)
2026–	Gloucester City	1	(0)
- * Club domestic league appearances and goals as of 17:23, 16 August 2026 (UTC)

Joshua Brendan Keyes (born April 26, 2006) is an English professional footballer who plays as a midfielder for Southern League club Gloucester City.

== Career ==
Keyes started his career with Swindon Town and made his debut during an away defeat to Reading in the EFL Trophy group stage.

== Career statistics ==
As of match played 11 August 2026

Appearances and goals by club, season and competition
Club	Season	League			FA Cup		League Cup		Other		Total	
Club	Season	Division	Apps	Goals	Apps	Goals	Apps	Goals	Apps	Goals	Apps	Goals
Swindon Town	2023–24	League Two	0	0	0	0	0	0	2 (Note: Appearances in EFL Trophy)	0	2	0
Cirencester Town (loan)	2023–24	Southern League Division One South	5	1	—		—		—		5	1
Watford	2024–25	Championship	0	0	0	0	0	0	—		0	0
Watford	2025–26	Championship	0	0	0	0	0	0	—		0	0
Watford	Total		0	0	0	0	0	0	0	0	0	0
Potters Bar Town (loan)	2025–26	Isthmian League Premier Division	3	0	0	0	—		—		3	0
Gloucester City	2026–27	Southern League Premier Division South	1	0	0	0	—		0	0	1	0
Career total			9	1	0	0	0	0	2	0	11	1
