= Saidou Khan =

Gambian footballer (born 1995)

Personal information
- Date of birth: 5 December 1995 (age 30)
- Place of birth: The Gambia
- Position: Midfielder

Team information
- Current team: Club Africain
- Number: 28

Senior career*
Years	Team	Apps	(Gls)
2014–2015	Tooting & Mitcham United	9	(0)
2015–2016	Dulwich Hamlet	0	(0)
2015	→ Carshalton Athletic (loan)		
2015–2016	→ Chipstead (loan)		
2016–2017	Kingstonian	14	(0)
2017–2018	Chipstead		
2018–2019	Tooting & Mitcham United	25	(2)
2019–2021	Maidstone United	32	(0)
2021	→ Dagenham & Redbridge (loan)	11	(0)
2021–2022	Chesterfield	37	(6)
2022–2025	Swindon Town	66	(2)
2024–2025	→ Tranmere Rovers (loan)	10	(0)
2025–	Club Africain	30	(1)

International career^{‡}
2024–	Gambia	1	(0)
- * Club domestic league appearances and goals as of 02:57, 26 October 2026 (UTC) ‡ National team caps and goals as of 17:50, 14 October 2024 (UTC)

Saidou Khan (born 5 December 1995) is a Gambian professional footballer who plays as a midfielder for Club Africain and the Gambia national team.

== Early and personal life ==
Khan grew up in Sanchaba in The Gambia; his father worked as a soldier on a peacekeeping mission in Liberia, and later moved to London to work as a security guard. Khan grew up "obsessed" with football; his favourite player was AC Milan's Kaká, and he is nicknamed 'Kaka' in The Gambia. Khan's father died of cancer when Khan was 12 years old. Khan moved to England in 2010, two years after his father's death.

== Club career ==
Khan spent his early career in English non-league football with Tooting & Mitcham United, Dulwich Hamlet, Carshalton Athletic, Chipstead and Kingstonian. During this time Khan studied at the University of East London and worked part-time at a Lidl supermarket. He later played in the National League South with Maidstone United, and the National League with Dagenham & Redbridge. He also has two unsuccessful trials with Football League club Milton Keynes Dons; he nearly quit football after his second rejection.

He signed for National League club Chesterfield in July 2021, on a two-year contract. By November 2021 he was the club's joint-top scorer that season. The club rejected a transfer bid for Khan in January 2022. He signed for Swindon Town for an undisclosed fee in July 2022.

He moved on loan to Tranmere Rovers in August 2024.

On 9 May 2025, Swindon announced the player would be leaving in June when his contract expired.

He subsequently joined Tunisian side Club Africain.

== International career ==
In May 2023, Khan received his first call-up to the Gambia national side ahead of their 2023 AFCON qualifier against South Sudan. He debuted with the Gambia in a 1–1 tie 2025 Africa Cup of Nations qualification with Madagascar on 11 October 2024.

== Career statistics ==
As of 1 October 2025.

Appearances and goals by club, season and competition
Club	Season	League			FA Cup		League Cup		Other		Total	
Club	Season	Division	Apps	Goals	Apps	Goals	Apps	Goals	Apps	Goals	Apps	Goals
Tooting & Mitcham United	2014–15	Isthmian League Division One South	9	0	0	0	—		0	0	9	0
Dulwich Hamlet	2015–16	Isthmian League Premier Division	0	0	0	0	—		1 (Note: Appearance in the Alan Turvey Trophy)	0	1	0
Carshalton Athletic (loan)	2015–16	Isthmian League Division One South										
Chipstead (loan)	2015–16	Isthmian League Division One South										
Kingstonian	2016–17	Isthmian League Premier Division	14	0	0	0	—		1 (Note: Appearances in the FA Trophy)	0	15	0
Chipstead	2016–17	Isthmian League Division One South										
Chipstead	2017–18	Isthmian League South Division	25	0	2	0	—		3 (Note: Two appearances in the FA Trophy, one in the Alan Turvey Trophy)	0	30	0
Chipstead	2018–19	Isthmian League South Central Division	4	0	1	0	—		1	0	6	0
Chipstead	Total		29	0	3	0	0	0	4	0	36	0
Tooting & Mitcham United	2018–19	Isthmian League South Central Division	25	2	—		—		0	0	25	2
Maidstone United	2019–20	National League South	28	0	5	2	—		2	0	35	2
Maidstone United	2020–21	National League South	4	0	1	0	—		2	1	7	1
Maidstone United	Total		32	0	6	2	0	0	4	1	42	3
Dagenham & Redbridge (loan)	2020–21	National League	11	0	—		—		—		11	0
Chesterfield	2021–22	National League	37	6	3	1	—		2 (Note: Appearances in the National League play-offs)	0	42	7
Swindon Town	2022–23	League Two	35	1	1	0	0	0	1 (Note: Appearance(s) in the EFL Trophy.)	0	37	1
Swindon Town	2023–24	League Two	31	1	1	0	1	0	0	0	33	1
Swindon Town	2024–25	League Two	0	0	0	0	0	0	0	0	0	0
Swindon Town	Total		66	2	2	0	1	0	1	0	70	2
Tranmere Rovers (loan)	2024–25	League Two	10	0	0	0	0	0	0	0	10	0
Club Africain	2025–26	Tunisian Ligue Professionnelle 1	6	0	0	0	0	0	0	0	6	0
Career total			239	10	14	3	1	0	13	1	267	14
