= Ricky Aguiar =

English footballer

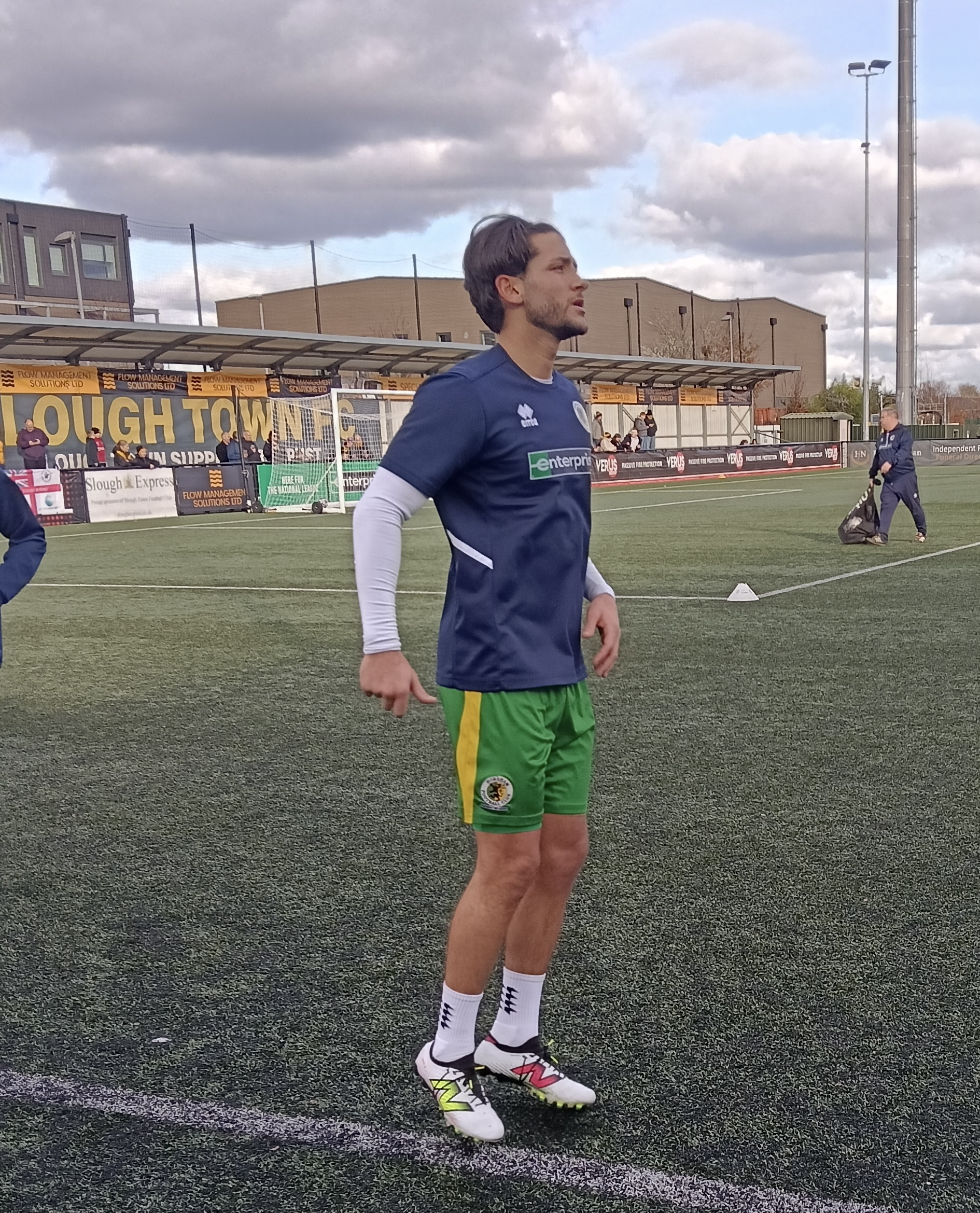
- Aguiar warming up for Horsham in 2026

Personal information
- Full name: Ricky Leon Aguiar
- Date of birth: 17 March 2001 (age 25)
- Place of birth: England
- Height: 1.85 m (6 ft 1 in)
- Position: Midfielder

Team information
- Current team: Worthing
- Number: 15

Youth career
- Shoreham
- Lewes

Senior career*
Years	Team	Apps	(Gls)
2018–2021	Worthing	72	(15)
2021–2024	Swindon Town	33	(2)
2021–2022	→ Chippenham Town (loan)	13	(7)
2023	→ Torquay United (loan)	2	(0)
2023–2024	→ Worthing (loan)	25	(11)
2024–2026	York City	30	(2)
2025–2026	→ Horsham (loan)	20	(2)
2026	→ Eastleigh (loan)	6	(0)
2026–	Worthing	0	(0)
- * Club domestic league appearances and goals as of 13:02, 7 June 2026 (UTC)

Ricky Leon Aguiar (born 17 March 2001) is an English professional footballer who plays as a midfielder for National League club Worthing.

== Career ==
After playing for Shoreham, Lewes and Worthing, Aguiar signed for Swindon Town in August 2021. He moved on loan to Chippenham Town in October 2021. In July 2022, Aguiar extended his contract with Swindon Town until the summer of 2025. He moved on loan to Torquay United in January 2023. He returned to Worthing in July 2023 on a season-long loan but, in January 2024, was recalled by his parent club.

Aguilar joined York City for an undisclosed fee in July 2024. On 7 November 2025, Aguiar joined National League South club Horsham on loan until January 2026. The loan was extended for a further month on 12 January and then again on 13 February. In March 2026, he joined Eastleigh on loan until the end of the season. On 11 May 2026, it was announced that Aguiar would leave York City at the end of his contract.

On 21 July 2026, Aguiar agreed to return to Worthing following their promotion to the National League.

== Career statistics ==
As of match played 25 April 2026

Appearances and goals by club, season and competition
Club	Season	League			FA Cup		EFL Cup		Other		Total	
Club	Season	Division	Apps	Goals	Apps	Goals	Apps	Goals	Apps	Goals	Apps	Goals
Worthing	2018–19	Isthmian League Premier Division	33	3	3	0	—		6 (Note: Three appearances in the FA Trophy, three appearances in the Alan Turvey Trophy.)	0	42	3
Worthing	2019–20	Isthmian League Premier Division	32	10	4	0	—		4 (Note: Two appearances and one goal in the FA Trophy, two appearances in the Alan Turvey Trophy.)	1	40	11
Worthing	2020–21	Isthmian League Premier Division	7	2	1	0	—		1 (Note: Appearance(s) in the FA Trophy.)	0	9	2
Worthing	Total		72	15	8	0	—		11	1	91	16
Swindon Town	2021–22	League Two	16	2	0	0	1	0	2 (Note: Appearances in the EFL Trophy.)	0	19	2
Swindon Town	2022–23	League Two	8	0	1	0	1	0	3	0	13	0
Swindon Town	2023–24	League Two	9	0	0	0	0	0	0	0	9	0
Swindon Town	Total		33	2	1	0	2	0	5	0	41	2
Chippenham Town (loan)	2021–22	National League South	13	7	—		—		1	0	14	7
Torquay United (loan)	2022–23	National League	2	0	—		—		1	0	3	0
Worthing (loan)	2023–24	National League South	25	11	4	0	—		1	0	30	11
York City	2024–25	National League	30	2	2	0	—		2	1	34	3
York City	2025–26	National League	0	0	0	0	—		0	0	0	0
York City	Total		30	2	1	0	0	0	0	0	32	3
Horsham (loan)	2025–26	National League South	20	2	0	0	—		4	0	24	2
Eastleigh (loan)	2025–26	National League	6	0	—		—		—		6	0
Worthing	2026–27	National League South	0	0	0	0	—		0	0	0	0
Career total			201	39	15	0	2	0	25	2	243	41
