= Tom Clayton (footballer) =

English footballer (born 2000)

Personal information
- Full name: Thomas Andrew Clayton
- Date of birth: 16 September 2000 (age 26)
- Position: Defender

Youth career
- 2009–2022: Liverpool

Senior career*
Years	Team	Apps	(Gls)
2019–2022	Liverpool	0	(0)
2022–2024	Swindon Town	35	(1)
- * Club domestic league appearances and goals as of 17:23, 3 May 2024 (UTC)

Thomas Andrew Clayton (born 16 September 2000) is an English professional footballer who last played as a defender for EFL League Two club Swindon Town, and who now serves as a coach for the Liverpool F.C. Academy.

== Career ==
Prior to his move to Swindon Town, Clayton played within the Liverpool youth system having joined at under-9 level. He joined Swindon Town in July 2022 and made his professional debut the following month in the 0-0 draw against Salford City.

Clayton missed most of the 2023–24 season with a succession of injuries. He was released by Swindon on the expiry of his contract at the end of that season.

After over a year without a club, Clayton was hired by his former club Liverpool to work as a coach at the club's Academy.

== Career statistics ==
As of match played 28 May 2023

Appearances and goals by club, season and competition
Club	Season	League			National cup		League cup		Other		Total	
Club	Season	Division	Apps	Goals	Apps	Goals	Apps	Goals	Apps	Goals	Apps	Goals
Liverpool U21	2019–20	—	—		—		—		2 (Note: Appearance(s) in the EFL Trophy)	0	2	0
Liverpool U21	2020–21	—	—		—		—		2	0	2	0
Liverpool U21	2021–22	—	—		—		—		1	0	1	0
Total			0	0	0	0	0	0	5	0	5	0
Swindon Town	2022–23	League Two	33	1	0	0	1	0	1	0	35	1
Total			33	1	0	0	1	0	1	0	35	1
Career total			33	1	0	0	1	0	6	0	40	1
