= George Alston =

English footballer (born 2006)

Personal information
- Full name: George Henry Alston
- Date of birth: 21 November 2006 (age 20)
- Place of birth: Chester, England
- Position: Forward

Team information
- Current team: Hungerford Town

Youth career
- –2023: Swindon Town

Senior career*
| Years | Team | Apps | (Gls) |
| 2023–2026 | Swindon Town | 1 | (0) |
| 2025 | → Swindon Supermarine (loan) | 1 | (0) |
| 2025 | → Swindon Supermarine (loan) | 19 | (1) |
| 2026 | → Evesham United (loan) | 4 | (0) |
| 2026– | Hungerford Town | 11 | (3) |
- * Club domestic league appearances and goals as of 12:50, 25 May 2026 (UTC)

George Henry Alston (born 21 November 2006) is an English professional footballer who plays as a forward for Hungerford Town.

== Career ==
Alston started his career with Swindon Town and made his debut during an away defeat to Reading in the EFL Trophy group stage.

In March 2026, he joined Southern Premier Division South side Evesham United on loan. At the end of the 2025-26 season he was released by Swindon Town. At the start of the 2026-27 season he joined Southern League Division One South club Hungerford Town.

== Career statistics ==
As of match played 29 March 2025

Appearances and goals by club, season and competition
| Club | Season | League | | | FA Cup | | League Cup | | Other | | Total | |
| Club | Season | Division | Apps | Goals | Apps | Goals | Apps | Goals | Apps | Goals | Apps | Goals |
|---|---|---|---|---|---|---|---|---|---|---|---|---|
| Swindon Town | 2023–24 | League Two | 0 | 0 | 0 | 0 | 0 | 0 | 1 (Note: Appearance in the EFL Trophy) | 0 | 1 | 0 |
| Swindon Town | 2024–25 | League Two | 1 | 0 | 0 | 0 | 0 | 0 | 0 | 0 | 1 | 0 |
| Swindon Town | 2025–26 | League Two | 0 | 0 | 0 | 0 | 0 | 0 | 0 | 0 | 0 | 0 |
| Swindon Town | Total | | 1 | 0 | 0 | 0 | 0 | 0 | 1 | 0 | 2 | 0 |
| Swindon Supermarine (loan) | 2024–25 | Southern League Premier Division South | 1 | 0 | 0 | 0 | 0 | 0 | 0 | 0 | 1 | 0 |
| Swindon Supermarine (loan) | 2025–26 | Southern League Division One South | 19 | 1 | 4 | 0 | 0 | 0 | 1 (Note: Appearance in the FA Trophy) | 0 | 24 | 1 |
| Evesham United (loan) | 2025–26 | Southern League Premier Division South | 4 | 0 | 0 | 0 | 0 | 0 | 0 | 0 | 4 | 0 |
| Career total | | | 25 | 1 | 4 | 0 | 0 | 0 | 2 | 0 | 31 | 1 |
