= Sonny Hart =

English footballer (born 2006)

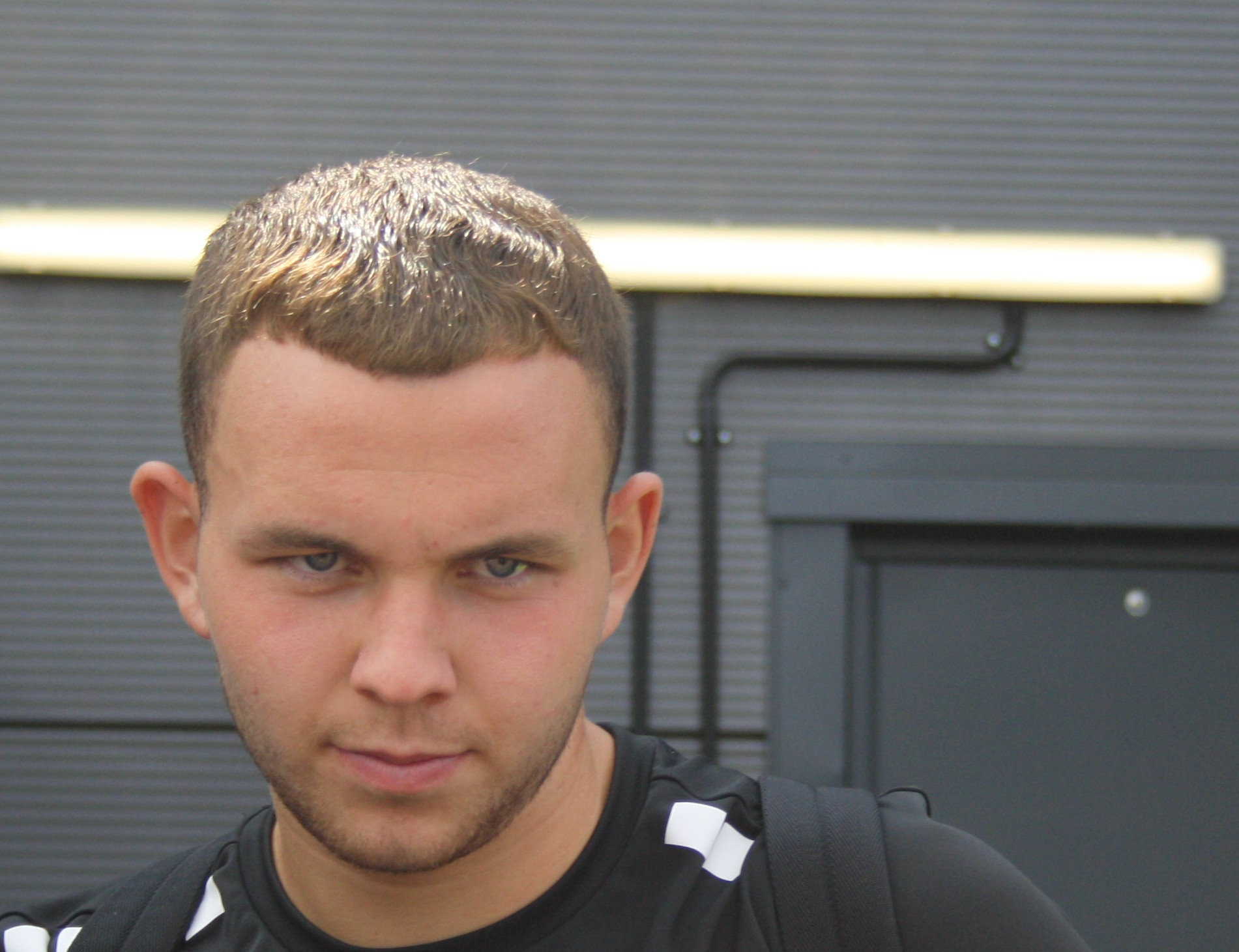

Personal information
- Full name: Sonny Terence Hart
- Date of birth: 9 July 2006 (age 20)
- Place of birth: Harold Wood, England
- Height: 1.92 m (6 ft 4 in)
- Position: Defender

Team information
- Current team: Swindon Town
- Number: 36

Youth career
- –2024: Swindon Town

Senior career*
Years	Team	Apps	(Gls)
2022–	Swindon Town	1	(0)
2023	→ Harrow Borough (loan)	16	(0)
2023	→ Gloucester City (loan)	3	(0)
2024	→ Canvey Island (loan)	4	(0)
2024–2025	→ Canvey Island (loan)	17	(0)
2025	→ Farnborough (loan)	14	(0)
2025–2026	→ Greenock Morton (loan)	0	(0)
2026	→ Farnborough (loan)	1	(0)
2026	→ St Albans City (loan)	12	(0)
2026–	→ Enfield Town (loan)	3	(0)
- * Club domestic league appearances and goals as of 16:27, 20 February 2026 (UTC)

Sonny Terence Hart (born 9 July 2006) is an English professional footballer who plays as a defender for Enfield Town on loan from Swindon Town.

== Career ==
Hart started his career with Swindon Town and made his first-team debut during an EFL Trophy second round tie in August 2022 against Crystal Palace U21, featuring for 10 minutes in the 2–0 defeat. Since making his debut for the club, Hart has enjoyed loan spells at both Harrow Borough and Gloucester City during the 2022–23 and 2023–24 campaigns.

In September 2024, Hart returned to Isthmian League Premier Division club Canvey Island on an initial one-month youth loan having had a spell with the club the previous season. In January 2025, he joined National League South side Farnborough on an initial one-month youth loan.

On 7 July 2025, Hart joined Scottish Championship club Greenock Morton on a season-long loan deal.

On 10 January 2026, it was confirmed that following the premature end to his spell at Greenock Morton, Hart would return to Farnborough for the remainder of the 2025–26 campaign on loan. On 12 February 2026, it was announced that Hart's loan was cut short and that he would return to Swindon Town, before joining Isthmian Premier Division club St Albans City on loan for the remainder of the season.

Ahead of the 2026-27 season, Hart joined Enfield Town on loan.

== Career statistics ==
As of match played 17 February 2026

Appearances and goals by club, season and competition
Club	Season	League			FA Cup		League Cup		Other		Total	
Club	Season	Division	Apps	Goals	Apps	Goals	Apps	Goals	Apps	Goals	Apps	Goals
Swindon Town	2022–23	League Two	0	0	0	0	0	0	1 (Note: Appearance in the EFL Trophy)	0	1	0
Swindon Town	2023–24	League Two	1	0	1	0	0	0	3	0	5	0
Swindon Town	2024–25	League Two	0	0	—		—		—		0	0
Swindon Town	2025–26	League Two	0	0	—		—		—		0	0
Swindon Town	Total		1	0	1	0	0	0	4	0	6	0
Harrow Borough (loan)	2022–23	Southern League Premier Division South	16	0	—		—		—		16	0
Gloucester City (loan)	2023–24	National League North	3	0	0	0	—		0	0	3	0
Canvey Island (loan)	2023–24	Isthmian League Premier Division	4	0	—		—		0	0	4	0
Canvey Island (loan)	2024–25	Isthmian League Premier Division	17	0	1	0	—		5 (Note: Two appearances and one goal in FA Trophy, three appearances in Essex Senior Cup)	1	23	1
Canvey Island (loan)	Total		21	0	1	0	0	0	5	1	27	1
Farnborough (loan)	2024–25	National League South	14	0	—		—		—		14	0
Greenock Morton (loan)	2025–26	Scottish Championship	0	0	0	0	1	0	1 (Note: Appearance in the Scottish Challenge Cup)	0	2	0
Farnborough (loan)	2025–26	National League South	1	0	—		—		—		1	0
St Albans City (loan)	2025–26	Isthmian League Premier Division	2	0	—		—		0	0	2	0
Career total			58	0	2	0	1	0	10	1	71	1
