= Brooklyn Genesini =

English footballer (born 2001)

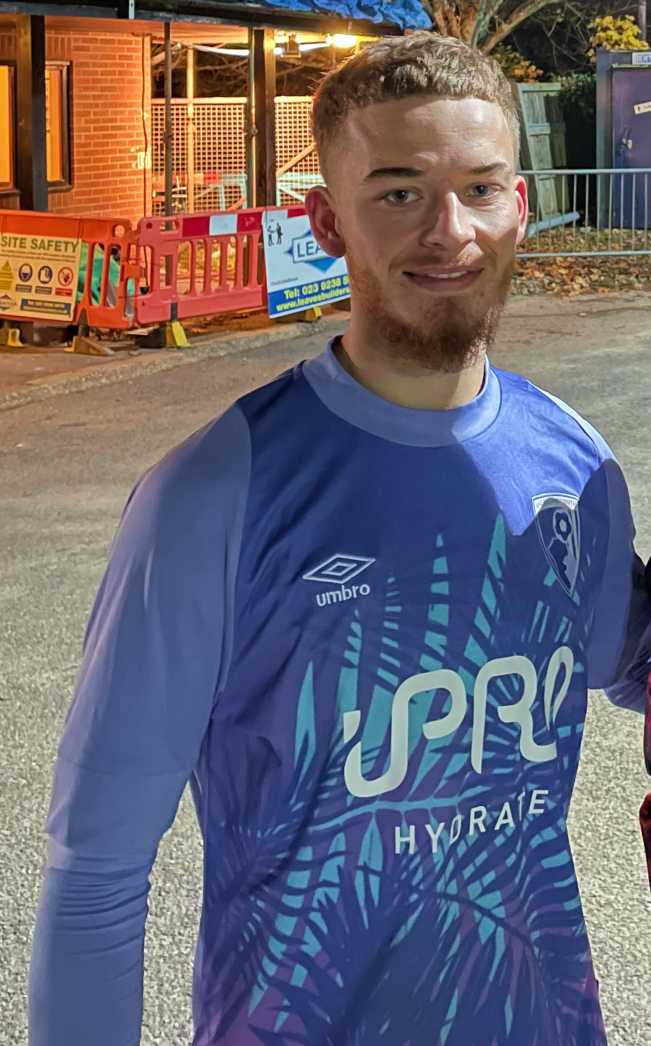
- Genesini in 2022

Personal information
- Full name: Brooklyn David Anthony Genesini
- Date of birth: 12 December 2001 (age 24)
- Place of birth: Yeovil, England
- Position: Right-back

Team information
- Current team: Weymouth

Youth career
- 2007–2009: Brazil Soccer School
- 2009–2021: AFC Bournemouth

Senior career*
Years	Team	Apps	(Gls)
2021–2023	AFC Bournemouth	0	(0)
2021	→ Poole Town (loan)	9	(0)
2022–2023	→ Næstved (loan)	6	(1)
2023–2024	Swindon Town	5	(0)
2024	→ Yeovil Town (loan)	7	(0)
2024–2025	Weymouth	38	(5)
2025	Dorchester Town	3	(0)
2025–	Weymouth	39	(3)
- * Club domestic league appearances and goals as of 12:53, 6 September 2026 (UTC)

Brooklyn David Anthony Genesini (born 12 December 2001) is an English professional footballer who plays as a right-back for Southern League Division One South club Weymouth.

== Career ==
=== AFC Bournemouth ===
Born in Yeovil, Genesini started his footballing career with the Brazil Soccer School before joining AFC Bournemouth. He spent time on loan at Poole Town and was in Bournemouth's squad which went to Portugal for pre-season training in 2022. On 23 August 2022, Genesini debuted for Bournemouth during a 2–2 win on penalties over Norwich City in the League Cup second round, scoring the equaliser in the game. Genesini had been on the pitch for one minute when he scored Bournemouth's second goal in the 92nd minute from Dominic Sadi's assist.

==== Loan to Næstved ====
On 1 September 2022, Genesini was sent on a season-long loan to Danish 1st Division club Næstved. He made his Næstved debut three days later, replacing Mads Agger in the 80th minute of a 3–0 home win over Vendsyssel FF. On 9 October 2022, he scored his first goal for the club, securing a 1–1 draw in injury time against HB Køge, coached by former Liverpool player Daniel Agger.

=== Swindon Town ===
In August 2023, Genesini signed for Swindon Town making him the club's eighth signing of the summer 2023 transfer window.

==== Loan to Yeovil Town ====
On 15 March 2024, Genesini signed for his hometown club Yeovil Town on loan until the end of 2023–24 season.

On 2 May 2024, Swindon announced the player would be released in the summer when his contract expired.

=== Weymouth ===
In July 2024, Genesini signed for National League South club Weymouth.

=== Dorchester Town ===
In August 2025, Genesini signed for Southern League Premier Division South club Dorchester Town on a short-term, non-contract basis. He made three substitute appearances for Dorchester Town.

=== Weymouth ===
In September 2025, Genesini rejoined Weymouth.

== Career statistics ==
As of end of 2025–26 season

Appearances and goals by club, season and competition.
Club	Season	League			National Cup (Note: Includes Danish Cup)		League Cup (Note: Includes EFL Cup)		Other		Total	
Club	Season	Division	Apps	Goals	Apps	Goals	Apps	Goals	Apps	Goals	Apps	Goals
AFC Bournemouth	2021–22	Championship	0	0	0	0	0	0	—		0	0
AFC Bournemouth	2022–23	Premier League	0	0	0	0	1	1	—		1	1
AFC Bournemouth	Total		0	0	0	0	1	1	—		1	1
Poole Town (loan)	2021–22	SL Premier Division South	9	0	0	0	—		1 (Note: Appearance in FA Trophy)	0	10	0
Næstved (loan)	2022–23	Danish 1st Division	6	1	1	0	—		—		7	1
Swindon Town	2023–24	League Two	5	0	0	0	1	0	3 (Note: Appearances in EFL Trophy)	0	9	0
Yeovil Town (loan)	2023–24	National League South	7	0	—		—		—		7	0
Weymouth	2024–25	National League South	38	5	4	1	—		5 (Note: Three appearances in FA Trophy, two appearances and one goal in Dorset Senior Cup)	1	47	7
Dorchester Town	2025–26	SL Premier Division South	3	0	—		—		—		3	0
Weymouth	2025–26	SL Premier Division South	35	0	—		—		1	0	36	0
Weymouth	2026–27	SL Division One South	4	3	3	3	—		0	0	7	6
Weymouth	Total		39	3	3	3	—		1	0	43	6
Career total			107	9	8	4	2	1	10	1	127	15

== Honours ==
Yeovil Town

- National League South: 2023–24
