= Fletcher Hubbard =

English association football player

Personal information
- Full name: Fletcher Alexander Hubbard
- Date of birth: 28 March 2006 (age 20)
- Position: Midfielder

Team information
- Current team: Braintree Town
- Number: 11

Youth career
- Upminster Park Rovers
- 2014–2021: West Ham United
- 2021–2023: Swindon Town

Senior career*
Years	Team	Apps	(Gls)
2023–2024	Swindon Town	1	(0)
2024	→ Melksham Town (loan)	1	(0)
2024–2025	Brightlingsea Regent	39	(10)
2025–	Braintree Town	20	(2)
2025	→ Brentwood Town (loan)	3	(0)
2025–2026	→ Aveley (loan)	3	(1)
2026	→ Aveley (loan)	12	(2)
- * Club domestic league appearances and goals as of 16:46, 1 November 2026 (UTC)

Fletcher Alexander Hubbard is an English professional footballer who plays as a midfielder for National League South club, Braintree Town.

== Career ==
Hubbard began his career with Upminster Park Rovers before moving to West Ham United in 2014. After spending seven years with the club, he chose to take up a scholarship with Swindon Town ahead of the 2021–22 campaign. He made his debut two years later in an EFL Trophy group stage match, coming during an away defeat to Reading. In March 2024, Hubbard moved to Melksham Town on loan for the remainder of the season. He was then later released by Swindon following the conclusion of his contract in June that campaign.

Ahead of the 2024–25 season, Hubbard chose to join Isthmian League North Division side Brightlingsea Regent. After making a strong start to life in Essex, he was rewarded with a new contract running until June 2025. Hubbard went on to conclude the season with 15 goals and 11 assists to his name as Brightlingsea Regent reached the Isthmian League North Division play-off final, before departing the club at the end of the season. His form saw him named in the Isthmian League North Division Team of the Season, as well as being named Player of the Season at Brightlingsea Regent. He was also showcased by Non-League Gems.

On 31 July 2025, he agreed to join National League side, Braintree Town for an undisclosed fee following a successful trial period. On 26 September 2025, Hubbard returned to the Isthmian League, to join Premier Division side, Brentwood Town on a one-month loan deal. On 23 December 2025, Hubbard joined Aveley on a one-month loan deal. He scored once in three appearances during his initial month with the club. After a brief return to Braintree Town in January 2026, Hubbard rejoined Aveley on loan in February for the remainder of the campaign.

== Career statistics ==
As of match played 24 October 2026

Appearances and goals by club, season and competition
Club	Season	League			FA Cup		League Cup		Other		Total	
Club	Season	Division	Apps	Goals	Apps	Goals	Apps	Goals	Apps	Goals	Apps	Goals
Swindon Town	2023–24	League Two	1	0	1	0	0	0	2 (Note: Appearance in the EFL Trophy)	0	4	0
Melksham Town (loan)	2023–24	Southern League Division One South	1	0	—		—		—		1	0
Brightlingsea Regent	2024–25	Isthmian League North Division	39	10	4	0	—		7 (Note: Two appearances in the FA Trophy, three appearances and one goal in the Alan Turvey Trophy, two appearances and one goal in the Isthmian League North Division play-offs)	2	50	12
Braintree Town	2025–26	National League	12	0	0	0	—		4 (Note: Appearances in the National League Cup)	1	16	1
Braintree Town	2026–27	National League South	8	2	3	1	—		1	0	12	3
Braintree Town	Total		20	2	3	1	—		5	1	28	4
Brentwood Town (loan)	2025–26	Isthmian League Premier Division	3	0	—		—		—		3	0
Aveley (loan)	2025–26	Isthmian League Premier Division	15	3	—		—		1 (Note: Appearance in the Isthmian League Premier Division play-offs)	0	16	3
Career total			79	15	8	1	0	0	15	3	102	19
