= William Kokolo =

French footballer (born 2000)

Personal information
- Full name: William Joseph Gabriel Kokolo
- Date of birth: 9 June 2000 (age 26)
- Place of birth: France
- Height: 1.80 m (5 ft 11 in)
- Positions: Left back; winger

Team information
- Current team: Nacional (on loan from Hannover 96)
- Number: 21

Youth career
- –2017: Monaco
- 2017–2018: Sunderland

Senior career*
Years	Team	Apps	(Gls)
2018–2020	Sunderland	0	(0)
2018–2019	→ Darlington (loan)	9	(0)
2020–2022	Middlesbrough	1	(0)
2022–2023	Burton Albion	16	(1)
2023–2024	Swindon Town	28	(2)
2024–2025	Laval	35	(1)
2025–	Hannover 96	13	(0)
2026–	→ Nacional (loan)	0	(0)
- * Club domestic league appearances and goals as of 20 August 2026

William Joseph Gabriel Kokolo (born 9 June 2000) is a French professional footballer who plays as a left back and winger for Primeira Liga club Nacional, on loan from 2. Bundesliga club Hannover 96.

== Club career ==
=== Sunderland ===
Kokolo signed for Sunderland in July 2017, having left Monaco at the age of 16.

On 6 December 2018, Kokolo signed for National League North side Darlington on a "work experience loan". He made his professional debut two days later, starting and playing the full match in a 2–1 loss to Nuneaton Borough. During his tenure, Kokolo made 3 starts and 6 substitute appearances for the Quakers.

=== Middlesbrough ===
On 11 March 2020, Kokolo signed a two-year contract with local rivals Middlesbrough of the Championship, signing for the Teesside-based club on a free transfer.

=== Burton Albion ===
On 11 January 2022, Kokolo signed for EFL League One side Burton Albion. He scored his first goal on 12 February 2022 in a 2-2 draw against Cambridge United

=== Swindon Town ===
On 11 November 2023, Kololo officially signed for EFL League Two side Swindon Town on a three-month deal, valid until January 2024 following a two-week trial period, joining the club on a free transfer after being released from Burton Albion at the end of the 2022-23 season. On 5 January 2024, Kokolo signed an extension to his contract until the end of the season.

=== Laval ===
Kokolo returned to French football when he signed for Ligue 2 club Laval in July 2024.

=== Hannover 96 ===
On 1 September 2025, Kokolo was signed by Hannover 96.

==== Nacional loan ====
Kokolo was loaned out to Nacional for the 2026–27 season.

== Personal life ==
Kokolo was born in France and holds Congolese and Malagasy nationality.

In August 2022, Kokolo was charged with three counts of rape. In June 2023 Kokolo was acquitted of all charges.
