= Abu Kanu (footballer, born 2006) =

English footballer (born 2006)

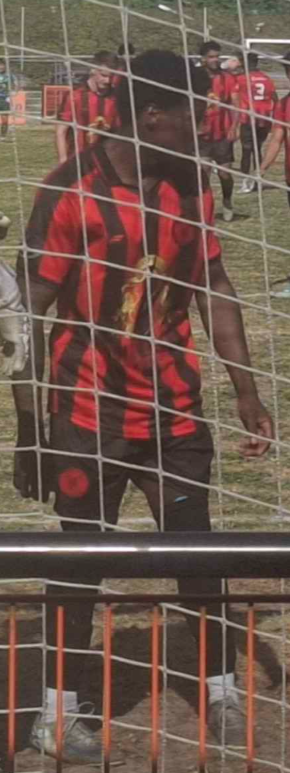
- Kanu with Sporting Khalsa in 2026

Personal information
- Full name: Abu Bakarr Kanu
- Date of birth: 14 June 2006 (age 20)
- Position: Forward

Team information
- Current team: Sporting Khalsa
- Number: 16

Youth career
- –2022: Swindon Town

Senior career*
Years	Team	Apps	(Gls)
2022–2024	Swindon Town	2	(0)
2026–	Sporting Khalsa	3	(0)
- * Club domestic league appearances and goals as of 21:40, 18 August 2026 (UTC)

Abu Bakarr Kanu (born 14 June 2006) is an English footballer who plays as a forward for Midland League Premier Division club Sporting Khalsa.

== Career ==
Kanu started his career with Swindon Town and made his first-team debut during an EFL Trophy second round tie in August 2022 against Crystal Palace U21, featuring for 57 minutes in the 2–0 defeat. He was released by the club in July 2024. On 1 January 2026, he joined Northern Premier League Division One West club Sporting Khalsa.

== Career statistics ==
As of 18 August 2026

Appearances and goals by club, season and competition
Club	Season	League			FA Cup		League Cup		Other		Total	
Club	Season	Division	Apps	Goals	Apps	Goals	Apps	Goals	Apps	Goals	Apps	Goals
Swindon Town	2022–23	League Two	2	0	0	0	0	0	1 (Note: Appearance in EFL Trophy)	0	3	0
Swindon Town	2023–24	League Two	0	0	0	0	0	0	1	0	1	0
Swindon Town	Total		2	0	0	0	0	0	2	0	4	0
Sporting Khalsa	2025–26	NPL Division One West	2	0	—		—		—		2	0
Sporting Khalsa	2026–27	Midland League Premier Division	1	0	0	0	—		1 (Note: Appearance in FA Trophy)	0	2	0
Career total			5	0	0	0	0	0	3	0	8	0
