= 2022–23 Swindon Town F.C. season =

Swindon Town
2022–23 season
- Chairman: Clem Morfuni
- Head coach: Scott Lindsey (until 11 January); Gavin Gunning, Steve Mildenhall (Interim, from 11 January to 31 January & 1 May to 8 May); Jody Morris (from 31 January to 1 May)
- Stadium: The County Ground
- League Two: 10th
- FA Cup: First round (eliminated by Stockport County)
- EFL Cup: First round (eliminated by Walsall)
- EFL Trophy: Group stage
- Top goalscorer: League: Jonny Williams (10); All: Jonny Williams (10)
- Highest home attendance: 11,053 vs Grimsby Town) 14 January 2023
- Lowest home attendance: 2,021 vs Crystal Palace) 30 August 2022
- Average home league attendance: 9,063
Home colours	Away colours	Third colours

The 2022–23 season is Swindon Town's 144th year in their history and the club's second consecutive season in League Two. Along with League Two, the club also competed in the FA Cup, the EFL Cup and the EFL Trophy. The season covers the period from 1 July 2022 to 30 June 2023.

== Managerial changes ==
On 30 May 2022, Ben Chorley resigned as the club's director of football. On 6 June 2022, Sandro Di Michele was appointed Technical Director. On 8 June, head coach Ben Garner left the club to join League One side Charlton Athletic. On 20 June 2022, Assistant Manager Scott Lindsey was appointed as head coach. On 23 June 2022, assistant manager Scott Marshall left the club to join League One side Charlton Athletic. Later that day Jamie Day was appointed as assistant manager. On 11 January 2023, head coach Scott Lindsey and assistant manager Jamie Day left the club to join fellow League Two side Crawley Town. That same day, Gavin Gunning and Steve Mildenhall were appointed as co-interim head coaches. On 31 January 2023, Jody Morris was appointed as head coach. On 1 February 2023, Ex Swindon Town player Michael Doughty was appointed the club's new Chief Sustainability Officer. On 1 May 2023, head coach Jody Morris and assistant head coach Ed Brand were dismissed, with Gavin Gunning and Steve Mildenhall re-appointed as co-interim head coaches for the final game of the season. The next day technical director Sandro Di Michele left the club after 11 months. A week later on 8 May 2023, the club announced before the final game of the season that Michael Flynn would be the new manager on a 2-year deal.

== Pre-season ==
Swindon Town announced friendlies against Melksham Town, Swindon Supermarine, Woking, Eastleigh, Cardiff City and Worthing.

2 July 2022 Friendly	Melksham Town	2–3	Swindon Town	Melksham
15:00 BST	Ballinger 18'; Pryce 23'	Report	Cassidy (Trialist) 15'; Aguiar 39'; Edwards (Trialist) 76'	Stadium: Oakfield Stadium; Attendance: 1,592

9 July 2022 Friendly	Swindon Supermarine	2–0	Swindon Town	Swindon
15:00 BST	Johns (yellow card) 25'; Harding 38' (Trialist) 85'	Report		Stadium: Hunts Copse; Attendance: 1414; Referee: Mitch Terry

12 July 2022 Friendly	Woking	0–4	Swindon Town	Woking
19:00 BST		Report	McKirdy 18' 69'; Williams 26'; Gladwin 54'	Stadium: Kingfield Stadium; Attendance: 1,018

16 July 2022 Friendly	Eastleigh	1–0	Swindon Town	Eastleigh
15:00 BST	Whitehall 9'	Report		Stadium: Ten Acres; Attendance: 704

23 July 2022 Friendly	Swindon Town	2–4	Cardiff City	Swindon
12:00 BST	Shade 74'; Wakeling 87'	Report	Watters 14'; Rinomhota 17'; Brennan 44' (o.g.); Ojo 76'	Stadium: The County Ground; Attendance: 3,590; Referee: Simon Hooper
Note: Earlier off kick moved to Noon from the original time of 15:00 on Police advice, due to other local events and policing capacity.

23 July 2022 Friendly	Worthing	5–1	Swindon Town	Worthing
15:00 BST	Pearce 24', 88'; Robinson 33', 43', 87'	Report	Parsons (penalty missed) 45' 45'	Stadium: Woodside Road

== Competitions ==
=== EFL League Two ===
==== League table ====
Pos	Team	Pld	W	D	L	GF	GA	GD	Pts	Promotion, qualification or relegation
7	Salford City	46	22	9	15	72	54	+18	75	Qualification for League Two play-offs
8	Mansfield Town	46	21	12	13	72	55	+17	75	
9	Barrow	46	18	8	20	47	53	−6	62	
10	Swindon Town	46	16	13	17	61	55	+6	61	
11	Grimsby Town	46	16	13	17	49	56	−7	61	
12	Tranmere Rovers	46	15	13	18	45	48	−3	58	
13	Crewe Alexandra	46	14	16	16	48	60	−12	58	

Source: EFL Official Website
Rules for classification: 1) Points; 2) Goal difference; 3) Number of goals scored; 4) Head-to-head results; 5) Wins; 6) Away goals; 7) Penalty points (sec 9.5); 8) 12-point sending off offences

==== Results summary ====
Overall								Home						Away					
Pld	W	D	L	GF	GA	GD	Pts	W	D	L	GF	GA	GD	W	D	L	GF	GA	GD
46	16	13	17	61	55	+6	61	9	6	8	31	24	+7	7	7	9	30	31	−1

Last updated: 29 April 2023.
Source: BBC

==== Results by matchday ====
Matchday	1	2	3	4	5	6	7	8	9	10	11	12	13	14	15	16	17	18	19	20	21	22	23	24	25	26	27	28	29	30	31	32	33	34	35	36	37	38	39	40	41	42	43	44	45	46
Ground	A	H	A	H	H	A	A	H	A	A	H	H	A	H	H	A	A	H	H	A	H	A	H	A	A	H	H	A	H	A	A	H	A	H	A	A	H	A	H	A	H	H	A	H	A	H
Result	L	D	D	D	W	D	D	W	W	W	L	W	L	W	W	D	W	D	L	L	D	W	L	W	L	W	D	L	L	L	W	W	D	L	D	D	L	L	L	L	D	W	W	L	L	W
Position	23	19	19	19	13	17	14	11	11	8	10	8	10	8	5	6	4	6	7	9	8	4	5	5	6	6	6	8	10	11	11	10	11	12	11	11	11	11	11	12	12	11	10	10	10	10

Updated to match(es) played on 29 April 2023. Source: 11v11 for league tables and fixtures
A = Away; H = Home; W = Win; D = Draw; L = Loss

==== Matches ====
Win Draw Loss Postponed

Swindon Town's League Two fixtures were announced on 23 June 2022.

30 July 2022 1	Harrogate Town	3–0	Swindon Town	Harrogate
15:00 BST	Burrell (yellow card) 10'; Dooley (yellow card) 28'; Pattison 43'; Daly 51'; Austerfield (yellow card) 61'; Muldoon 76'	Report	Gladwin (penalty missed) 66'	Stadium: Wetherby Road; Attendance: 1,948 (600); Referee: Tom Reeves

6 August 2022 2	Swindon Town	0–0	Salford City	Swindon
15:00 BST	McKirdy (yellow card) 14' (yellow-red card) 43'; Baudry (yellow card) 15'; Shade (yellow card) 19'; Wakeling (yellow card) 36'; Reed (yellow card) 55'; Darcy (yellow card) 69'; MacDonald (yellow card) 74'	Report	Bolton (yellow card) 58'	Stadium: The County Ground; Attendance: 9,158 (125); Referee: Andy Woolmer

13 August 2022 3	Carlisle United	1–1	Swindon Town	Carlisle
15:00 BST	Dennis 45'; Moxon (yellow card) 63'	Report	Reed (yellow card) 18'; Wakeling 22'; MacDonald (yellow card) 90+4'	Stadium: Brunton Park; Attendance: 5,602 (311); Referee: Andrew Kitchen

16 August 2022 4	Swindon Town	1–1	Leyton Orient	Swindon
19:45 BST	McKirdy 4'; Wakeling (yellow card) 74'	Report	Smyth 7'; Mizouni (yellow card) 71'; James (yellow card) 88'	Stadium: The County Ground; Attendance: 8,130 (412); Referee: Robert Lewis

20 August 2022 5	Swindon Town	3–0	Rochdale	Swindon
15:00 BST	Wakeling 1'; Khan (yellow card) 41'; Williams 50'; Gladwin (yellow card) 76'; McKirdy 81'	Report	Nelson (yellow card) 66'; Brierley (yellow card) 90+2'	Stadium: The County Ground; Attendance: 8,327 (122); Referee: Sam Barrott

27 August 2022 6	Stockport County	1–1	Swindon Town	Stockport
15:00 BST	Brown (yellow card) 52'; Jennings (yellow card) 66'; Madden (red card) 80'; Sarcevic 84'	Report	Blake-Tracy 49' (yellow card) 50'; Reed (yellow card) 70'	Stadium: Edgeley Park; Attendance: 8,233 (701); Referee: Sam Allison

3 September 2022 7	Gillingham	0–0	Swindon Town	Gillingham
15:00 BST	Mnoga (yellow card) 6' (yellow-red card) 10'	Report	J.Williams (yellow card) 55'	Stadium: Priestfield Stadium; Attendance: 4,927 (671); Referee: Martin Woods

10 September 2022	Swindon Town	P–P	Newport County	Swindon
15:00 BST				Stadium: The County Ground
Note: Newport clash called-off as a mark of respect following the death of Queen Elizabeth II...

13 September 2022 8	Swindon Town	3–2	Sutton United	Swindon
19:45 BST	Clayton (yellow card) 27'; Shade 35'; Williams 38'; Lavinier (yellow card) 68'; Wakeling 90+2'	Report	Randall 4' 42'; Bugiel (yellow card) 31'; Barden (yellow card) 81'	Stadium: The County Ground; Attendance: 7,589 (85); Referee: Darren Handley

17 September 2022 9	Doncaster Rovers	0–1	Swindon Town	Doncaster
15:00 BST	Rowe (yellow card) 10'	Report	Baudry (yellow card) 45+2'; Wakeling 59'	Stadium: Keepmoat Stadium; Attendance: 6,446 (632); Referee: Charles Breakspear

24 September 2022 10	Grimsby Town	1–2	Swindon Town	Cleethorpes
15:00 BST	Taylor 25'; Glennon (yellow card) 48'	Report	Jephcott 13' (yellow card) 87'; Darcy 44'; S.Khan (yellow card) 49' (yellow-red card) 62'; Hutton (yellow card) 85'; Blake-Tracy (yellow card) 90+7'	Stadium: Blundell Park; Attendance: 6,805 (353); Referee: Declan Bourne

1 October 2022 11	Swindon Town	1–2	Northampton Town	Swindon
15:00 BST	Reed (yellow card) 57'; Williams 61'; Blake-Tracy (yellow card) 67'	Report	Guthrie (yellow card) 62'; Sherring (yellow card) 62'; Fox 68'; Pinnock 88'	Stadium: The County Ground; Attendance: 9,789 (614); Referee: Alan Young

4 October 2022 12	Swindon Town	1–0	Newport County	Swindon
19:45 BST	Gladwin (yellow card) 13'; Darcy (yellow card) 19'; Jephcott 51'; Blake-Tracy (yellow card) 75'	Report	A.Lewis (yellow card) 45+3'	Stadium: The County Ground; Attendance: 9,325 (648); Referee: Peter Wright

8 October 2022 13	Stevenage	2–0	Swindon Town	Stevenage
15:00 BST	Roberts 11' 60'; Piergianni (yellow card) 45+3'	Report	Baudry (yellow card) 59'; Clayton (yellow card) 88'	Stadium: Broadhall Way; Attendance: 4,087 (885); Referee: Scott Oldham

15 October 2022 14	Swindon Town	1–0	Colchester United	Swindon
15:00 BST	Shade 64'; Gladwin (yellow card) 88'	Report	Marshall-Miranda (yellow card) 37'; Tchamadeu (yellow card) 45+1'	Stadium: The County Ground; Attendance: 8,375 (257); Referee: Andy Haines

22 October 2022 15	Swindon Town	2–1	Hartlepool United	Swindon
15:00 BST	Williams 12'; Jephcott 17'; Hutton (yellow card) 53'; Darcy (yellow card) 81'; Iandolo (yellow card) 90+6'	Report	Oduor 28'; Murray (yellow card) 58'; Tumilty (yellow card) 90+4'	Stadium: The County Ground; Attendance: 8,527 (123); Referee: Darren Drysdale

25 October 2022 16	Bradford City	1–1	Swindon Town	Bradford
19:45 BST	Wright 31'	Report	Iandolo (yellow card) 34'; Jephcott (penalty missed) 90+2' 90+2'	Stadium: Valley Parade; Attendance: 16,728 (357); Referee: Jeremy Simpson

29 October 2022 17	Mansfield Town	2–5	Swindon Town	Mansfield
15:00 BST	Gordon 1'; Swan 30'; Boateng (yellow card) 31' (yellow-red card) 59'; Maris (yellow card) 38'; Pym (yellow card) 60'; O'Toole (yellow card) 70'	Report	Williams 7' 35' (yellow card) 72'; Jephcott 51' (yellow card) 77'; Darcy 68'; Gladwin 85' (pen.)	Stadium: Field Mill; Attendance: 6,804 (734); Referee: Carl Brook

12 November 2022 18	Swindon Town	1–1	Tranmere Rovers	Swindon
15:00 GMT	Wakeling 30'	Report	Hawkes 9'; Turnbull (yellow card) 34' (yellow-red card) 90+5'; Nevitt (yellow card) 59'; Simeu (yellow card) 90'	Stadium: The County Ground; Attendance: 9,425 (317); Referee: Lee Swabey

19 November 2022 19	Swindon Town	0–1	Crewe Alexandra	Swindon
15:00 GMT	Brennan (yellow card) 40'; Iandolo (yellow card) 90+2'	Report	Agyei 23' (pen.); King (yellow card) 30'	Stadium: The County Ground; Attendance: 8,734 (167); Referee: Andrew Kitchen

3 December 2022 20	Crawley Town	2–0	Swindon Town	Crawley
15:00 GMT	Lynch (yellow card) 44'; Tsaroulla 79'; Powell 83'	Report	Reed (yellow card) 32'	Stadium: Broadfield Stadium; Attendance: 3,230 (920); Referee: Martin Woods

10 December 2022 21	Swindon Town	0–0	AFC Wimbledon	Swindon
15:00 GMT	Blake-Tracy (yellow card) 29'; Lavinier (yellow card) 89'	Report	Pell (yellow card) 63'; Woodyard (yellow card) 71'; Maghoma (yellow card) 81'; Davison (yellow card) 90'	Stadium: The County Ground; Attendance: 8,430 (529); Referee: Sam Allison

17 December 2022 22	Barrow	0–1	Swindon Town	Barrow-in-Furness
15:00 GMT	Farman (yellow card) 5'	Report	Reed 7' (pen.); MacDonald (yellow card) 33'; Shade (yellow card) 45'; Hutton (yellow card) 72'	Stadium: Holker Street; Attendance: 2,617 (171); Referee: Robert Lewis

26 December 2022 23	Swindon Town	1–2	Walsall	Swindon
15:00 GMT	Iandolo 33'; MacDonald (yellow card) 51'	Report	Hutton 45+1' (o.g.); Johnson (yellow card) 51'; Monthé 90+4'	Stadium: The County Ground; Attendance: 10,240 (465); Referee: James Oldham

29 December 2022 24	Northampton Town	1–2	Swindon Town	Northampton
19:45 GMT	Bowie (yellow card) 82'; Hoskins (yellow card) 89' (goal) 90'	Report	Shade 26' (yellow card) 80'; Iandolo (yellow card) 45+2'; Lavinier 56'; Hepburn-Murphy (yellow card) 90+7'	Stadium: Sixfields Stadium; Attendance: 7,156 (1,455); Referee: Lewis Smith

1 January 2023 25	Colchester United	1–0	Swindon Town	Colchester
15:00 GMT	Hannant 30' (yellow card) 74'; Ashley (yellow card) 70'; Fevrier (yellow card) 90+2'	Report	Khan (yellow card) 76'; MacDonald (yellow card) 84'	Stadium: Colchester Community Stadium; Attendance: 3,599 (500); Referee: Carl Brook

7 January 2023	Swindon Town	P–P	Stevenage	Swindon
15:00 GMT				Stadium: The County Ground
Note: Match postponed due to Stevenage competing in the 2022–23 FA Cup Third round.

14 January 2023 26	Swindon Town	5–0	Grimsby Town	Swindon
15:00 GMT	Austin 25'; Lavinier 62'; Williams 66'; Khan (yellow card) 71' (goal) 88'; Darcy 78'	Report	Amos (red card) 34'; Clifton (yellow card) 59'; Holohan (yellow card) 74'	Stadium: The County Ground; Attendance: 11,053 (565); Referee: Sam Purkiss

21 January 2023	Walsall	P–P	Swindon Town	Walsall
15:00 GMT				Stadium: Bescot Stadium
Note: Match postponed due to Frozen pitch.

24 January 2023	Swindon Town	P–P	Stevenage	Swindon
19:45 GMT				Stadium: The County Ground
Note: Match postponed due to Frozen pitch.

28 January 2023 27	Swindon Town	3–3	Gillingham	Swindon
15:00 GMT	J.Williams 1'; Khan (yellow card) 41' (yellow-red card) 81'; Austin 57' (pen.) 78'; Brennan (yellow card) 69'	Report	Dieng 2' (yellow card) 24'; Wright 9' (pen.); Nichols 13' (yellow card) 44'	Stadium: The County Ground; Attendance: 10,259 (961); Referee: Paul Howard

4 February 2023 28	Newport County	2–1	Swindon Town	Newport
12:45 GMT	Clarke (yellow card) 16'; Farquharson (yellow card) 38'; Norman 54' (yellow card) 60'; Kavanagh 78'; Townsend (yellow card) 90+4'	Report	Hepburn-Murphy (red card) 15'; Kadji (yellow card) 42'; Adeloye 90+1'	Stadium: Rodney Parade; Attendance: 4,757 (1,000); Referee: Neil Hair
Note: Earlier kick off on police advice

11 February 2023 29	Swindon Town	0–2	Doncaster Rovers	Swindon
15:00 GMT	Iandolo (yellow card) 60'; Darcy (yellow card) 67'	Report	Lakin (yellow card) 35'; Anderson (yellow card) 45+1'; Brown (yellow card) 53'; Molyneux 71', 73'	Stadium: The County Ground; Attendance: 9,486 (293); Referee: Ollie Yates

14 February 2023 30	Sutton United	2–1	Swindon Town	Sutton
19:45 GMT	Rowe (yellow card) 41'; Bugiel (yellow card) 59'; Angol 85'; Smith 88'	Report	Austin 14'; McEachran (yellow card) 31'; Iandolo (yellow card) 86'; Blake-Tracy (yellow card) 87'	Stadium: Gander Green Lane; Attendance: 2,928 (608); Referee: Charles Breakspear

18 February 2023 31	Salford City	1–2	Swindon Town	Salford
15:00 GMT	Watson 4', (yellow card) 59'; Watt (yellow card) 48'	Report	Wakeling 26'; Watt 55' (o.g.); Wakeling (yellow card) 70'; Hutton (yellow card) 88'	Stadium: Moor Lane; Attendance: 3,008 (715); Referee: Will Finnie

25 February 2023 32	Swindon Town	3–0	Harrogate Town	Swindon
15:00 GMT	Hepburn-Murphy 8', 40'; Wakeling (yellow card) 58'; Tomlinson 78'	Report	Falkingham (yellow card) 13'; Muldoon (yellow card) 21'; Eastman (yellow card) 27'	Stadium: The County Ground; Attendance: 8,756 (73); Referee: Oliver Langford

5 March 2023 33	Leyton Orient	1–1	Swindon Town	Leyton, London
15:00 GMT	Beckles 12'; Turns (yellow card) 75'	Report	Wakeling 64'; McEachran (yellow card) 67'	Stadium: Brisbane Road; Attendance: 8,623 (1,256); Referee: Sam Barrott

11 March 2023 34	Swindon Town	1–2	Carlisle United	Swindon
15:00 GMT	Wakeling (yellow card) 17'; Austin (yellow card) 58'; Clayton (yellow card) 70'; Shade 80', (yellow card) 87'	Report	Guy (yellow card) 9'; Armer 51'; McCalmont (yellow card) 56'; Moxon (yellow card) 76'; Edmondson 90+6'	Stadium: The County Ground; Attendance: 9,330 (558); Referee: Sam Purkiss

14 March 2023 35	Walsall	0–0	Swindon Town	Walsall
19:45 GMT	Maddox (yellow card) 53'; Comley (yellow card) 55'	Report		Stadium: Bescot Stadium; Attendance: 5,703 (883); Referee: Martin Woods

18 March 2023 36	Rochdale	4–4	Swindon Town	Rochdale
15:00 GMT	Rodney 22'; Lloyd 25'; Dodgson (yellow card) 63'; Odoh 71'; Henderson 90+4'; Mullarkey (yellow card) 90+4'	Report	Austin 2', 14', 74', 79'; Clayton (yellow card) 90+4'	Stadium: Spotland; Attendance: 2,611 (397); Referee: Bobby Madden

25 March 2023 37	Swindon Town	0–1	Stockport County	Swindon
15:00 GMT	Wakeling (red card) 1'; Hepburn-Murphy (yellow card) 3'; Brynn (yellow card) 60'; Williams (yellow card) 62'	Report	Madden (penalty missed) 2'; Rydel (yellow card) 45+4'; Lewis (yellow card) 48'; Knoyle (yellow card) 49'; Lemonheigh-Evans (yellow card) 64'; Croasdale 80'; Wootton (yellow card) 90+4'	Stadium: The County Ground; Attendance: 9,446 (712); Referee: Alan Young

1 April 2023 38	Hartlepool United	2–1	Swindon Town	Hartlepool
15:00 BST	Murray (yellow card) 55'; Sylla (yellow card) 64'; Pruti (yellow card) 76'; Sterry (yellow card) 78'; Jennings 88'; Finney 90+4'	Report	Hepburn-Murphy 4' (yellow card) 70'; Blake-Tracy (yellow card) 52'; McEachran (yellow card) 90+6'	Stadium: Victoria Park; Attendance: 4,815 (433); Referee: Darren Drysdale

7 April 2023 39	Swindon Town	2–4	Mansfield Town	Swindon
15:00 BST	Hepburn-Murphy 3'; Brewitt (yellow card) 20'; Austin (yellow card) 22'; Williams 86'	Report	Quinn 13' (yellow card) 57'; Akins 32'; Oates 33'; Hewitt (yellow card) 41'; Boateng 65'	Stadium: The County Ground; Attendance: 9,281 (587); Referee: Thomas Parsons

10 April 2023 40	Tranmere Rovers	1–0	Swindon Town	Birkenhead
15:00 BST	Saunders 22'	Report	McEachran (yellow card) 36'; Darcy (yellow card) 89'	Stadium: Prenton Park; Attendance: 5,564 (450); Referee: Andrew Kitchen

15 April 2023 41	Swindon Town	0–0	Barrow	Swindon
15:00 BST		Report	Brough (yellow card) 68'; Gotts (yellow card) 76'	Stadium: The County Ground; Attendance: 8,080 (147); Referee: Paul Howard

18 April 2023 42	Swindon Town	1–0	Bradford City	Swindon
19:45 BST	Williams 82'	Report	Ridehalgh (yellow card) 78'; Osadebe (yellow card) 88'	Stadium: The County Ground; Attendance: 7,413 (557); Referee: Darren Drysdale

22 April 2023 43	AFC Wimbledon	1–5	Swindon Town	Wimbledon, London
15:00 BST	Pierre 8', (yellow card) 67', (red card) 90+1'; Jaiyesimi (yellow card) 24'; Chislett (yellow card) 59'; Marsh (yellow card) 82'	Report	Jephcott 16', 32' (pen.); Wakeling 18'; Hutton (yellow card) 28'; Lavinier (yellow card) 49'; Williams (yellow card) 55'; Khan (yellow card) 59'; Clayton 61'; Darcy 90+2' (pen.)	Stadium: Plough Lane; Attendance: 8,421 (1,191); Referee: Scott Simpson

25 April 2023 44	Swindon Town	0–1	Stevenage	Swindon
19:45 BST		Report	Reid 25'; Clark (yellow card) 90+7'	Stadium: The County Ground; Attendance: 8,289 (311); Referee: Ben Speedie

29 April 2023 45	Crewe Alexandra	2–1	Swindon Town	Crewe
15:00 BST	O'Riordan (yellow card) 41'; Long (yellow card) 70'; Thomas 82'; Tabiner 86'	Report	Hepburn-Murphy 44'; Minturn (yellow card) 65'	Stadium: Gresty Road; Attendance: 4,694 (425); Referee: Ruebyn Ricardo

8 May 2023 46	Swindon Town	2–1	Crawley Town	Swindon
12:30 BST	Khan (yellow card) 24'; Austin 41'; Cain 43'; Hepburn-Murphy (penalty missed) 64'	Report	Gladwin (yellow card) 42'; Telford 62' (pen.); Nadesan (yellow card) 67'	Stadium: The County Ground; Attendance: 10,450 (528); Referee: Jeremy Simpson
Note: Earlier kick off and date change due to the coronation of His Majesty King Charles III

=== FA Cup ===
Town were drawn away to Stockport County in the first round.

5 November 2022 First Round	Stockport County	4–0	Swindon Town	Stockport
15:00 GMT	Sarcevic 11' 29'; Wright 16'; Rydel 58'; Brown (yellow card) 79'	Report	Khan (yellow card) 1'; Hutton (yellow card) 29'; Reed (yellow card) 88'	Stadium: Edgeley Park; Attendance: 4,534 (502); Referee: Marc Edwards

Win Draw Loss

=== EFL Cup ===
Town were drawn away to Walsall in the first round.

9 August 2022 First Round	Walsall	2–0	Swindon Town	Walsall
19:45 BST	Johnson 80' (pen.); Abraham 81'	Report	Minturn (red card) 78'; Adeloye (yellow card) 81'; Harries (yellow card) 85'; Darcy (yellow card) 90+5'	Stadium: Bescot Stadium; Attendance: 2,889 (448); Referee: Thomas Parsons

Win Draw Loss

=== EFL Trophy ===
On 20 June, the initial Group stage draw was made, grouping Swindon Town with Bristol Rovers and Plymouth Argyle. On 23 June, Crystal Palace U21 was added to Group E.

Pos	Div	Team	Pld	W	PW	PL	L	GF	GA	GD	Pts	Qualification
1	L1	Plymouth Argyle	3	2	1	0	0	5	2	+3	8	Advance to Round 2
2	L1	Bristol Rovers	3	2	0	1	0	6	1	+5	7	Advance to Round 2
3	ACA	Crystal Palace U21	3	1	0	0	2	2	3	−1	3	
4	L2	Swindon Town	3	0	0	0	3	1	8	−7	0	

Source: EFL.com

Win Draw Loss

30 August 2022 Group Stage	Swindon Town	0–2	Crystal Palace U21	Swindon
19:00 BST	Harries (yellow card) 43' (yellow-red card) 85'; Minturn (yellow card) 45+2'	Report	Grehan (yellow card) 43'; Mooney (yellow card) 45+4'; Addae (yellow card) 50'; Gordon 71' 86'; Ozoh (yellow card) 78'	Stadium: The County Ground; Attendance: 2,021 (40); Referee: Ben Speedie

20 September 2022 Group Stage	Swindon Town	1–3	Plymouth Argyle	Swindon
19:00 BST	Iandolo (yellow card) 24'; Khan (yellow card) 41'; Hepburn-Murphy 90+1'	Report	Jenkins-Davies 28'; Halls 30'; Cosgrove (yellow card) 45+2'; Whittaker (yellow card) 66'; Hardie 88'; Butcher (yellow card) 90'	Stadium: The County Ground; Attendance: 2,026 (125); Referee: David Rock

18 October 2022 Group Stage	Bristol Rovers	3–0	Swindon Town	Bristol
19:00 BST	Loft 63'; Anderson 76'; McCormick 83'	Report	Brennan (yellow card) 15' (yellow-red card) 32'; Aguiar (red card) 44'; Reed (yellow card) 48'; Minturn (yellow card) 53'; Lavinier (yellow card) 73'	Stadium: Memorial Stadium; Attendance: 1,700 (218); Referee: David Rock

=== Wiltshire Premier Shield ===
Town were drawn away to Chippenham Town in the quarter-final. Town were drawn away to Salisbury in the Semi-Final.

10 January 2023 Quarter-Final	Chippenham Town	1–3	Swindon Town	Chippenham
19:30 GMT	Warre 12'; Mitchell (yellow card) 73'	Report	Massey 3'; Adeloye 4', 70' (pen.)	Stadium: Hardenhuish Park; Attendance: 251 (?); Referee: Sam Read

28 March 2023 Semi-Final	Salisbury	2–3	Swindon Town	Salisbury
19:45 GMT	Fitchett 62', 65'	Report	Adeloye 4' (yellow card) 75'; Kadji 25', 45+1'; Brown (yellow card) 38'; Kanu (red card) 64'; Harries (yellow card) 80'	Stadium: The Raymond McEnhill Stadium; Attendance: 275; Referee: Adam Gregory

9 May 2023 Final	Swindon Town	0–3	Westbury United	Swindon
19:45 GMT		Report	Bole 9'; Stradling 22'; S. Hulbert 48' (pen.)	Stadium: The County Ground; Referee: Sam Read

Win Draw Loss

== Transfers ==
=== In ===
Date	Pos	Player	Transferred from	Fee	Ref
1 July 2022	LW	(England) Oscar Massey	(England) Plymouth Argyle	Free	
1 July 2022	RW	(Saint Kitts and Nevis) Tyrese Shade	(England) Leicester City	Free	
1 July 2022	LB	(England) Reece Devine	(England) Manchester United	Free	
1 July 2022	CB	(Wales) Cian Harries	(England) Bristol Rovers	Free	
5 July 2022	ST	(England) Jacob Wakeling	(England) Leicester City	Free	
12 July 2022	CB	(Scotland) Tom Clayton	(England) Liverpool	Undisclosed	
13 July 2022	CM	(England) Ronan Darcy	(England) Bolton Wanderers	Undisclosed	
15 July 2022	CAM	(The Gambia) Saidou Khan	(England) Chesterfield	Undisclosed	
15 July 2022	RB	(England) Remeao Hutton	(England) Barrow	Undisclosed	
15 July 2022	ST	(England) Tomi Adeloye	(Scotland) Ayr United	Free	
19 July 2022	CB	(England) Angus MacDonald	(England) Rotherham United	Free	
1 September 2022	RB	(England) Marcel Lavinier	(England) Tottenham Hotspur	Free	
1 September 2022	ST	(England) Rushian Hepburn-Murphy	(Cyprus) Pafos	Free	
1 September 2022	GK	(Republic of Ireland) Conor Brann	(Republic of Ireland) Galway United	Free	
1 September 2022	RM	(Wales) Morgan Roberts	(England) Banbury United	Undisclosed	
30 December 2022	ST	(England) Charlie Austin	(Australia) Brisbane Roar	Free	
16 January 2023	CM	(England) Jake Cain	(England) Liverpool	Undisclosed	
31 January 2023	LB	(England) Frazer Blake-Tracy	(England) Burton Albion	Undisclosed	
13 February 2023	CM	(England) George McEachran	Free agent	—N/a	
7 March 2023	CB	(England) Tom Brewitt	(United States) Hartford Athletic	Free	

=== Out ===
Date	Pos	Player	Transferred to	Fee	Ref
30 June 2022	CB	(England) Dion Conroy	(England) Crawley Town	Released	
30 June 2022	CM	(England) Ryan East	(England) Bradford City	Released	
30 June 2022	GK	(England) Emmanuel Idem	Free agent	Released	
30 June 2022	RM	(England) Jayden Mitchell-Lawson	(Scotland) Ayr United	Released	
1 July 2022	RB	(England) Mandela Egbo	(England) Charlton Athletic	Free	
1 July 2022	GK	(Ghana) Joe Wollacott	(England) Charlton Athletic	Free	
2 July 2022	CB	(England) Akin Odimayo	(England) Northampton Town	Compensation	
9 July 2022	CM	(England) Levi Francis	(England) Slimbridge	Free	
18 July 2022	CAM	(England) Jack Payne	(England) Charlton Athletic	Free	
24 July 2022	CB	(England) Callum Winchcombe	(England) Basingstoke Town	Free	
27 July 2022	RB	(England) Rob Hunt	(England) Leyton Orient	Free	
1 September 2022	GK	(England) Lewis Ward	(England) Sutton United	Undisclosed	
1 September 2022	FW	(England) Harry McKirdy	(Scotland) Hibernian	Undisclosed	
15 January 2023	CDM	(England) Louis Reed	(England) Mansfield Town	Undisclosed	
27 January 2023	CM	(England) Ben Gladwin	(England) Crawley Town	Undisclosed	
31 January 2023	CB	(England) Angus MacDonald	(Scotland) Aberdeen	Free	

=== Loans in ===
Date	Pos	Player	Loaned from	On loan until	Ref
23 June 2022	GK	(England) Sol Brynn	(England) Middlesbrough	End of season	
1 July 2022	CB	(Republic of Ireland) Ciaran Brennan	(England) Sheffield Wednesday	End of season	
10 August 2022	LB	(England) Frazer Blake-Tracy	(England) Burton Albion	31 January 2023	
1 September 2022	ST	(Wales) Luke Jephcott	(England) Plymouth Argyle	End of season	
31 January 2023	LB	(England) Joe Tomlinson	(England) Peterborough United	End of season	
1 February 2023	CDM	(England) Dylan Kadji	(England) Bristol City	End of season	

=== Loans out ===
Date	Pos	Player	Loaned to	On loan until	Ref
26 August 2022	ST	(England) Harry Parsons	(England) Banbury United	October 2022	
12 September 2022	ST	(England) Oscar Massey	(England) Hungerford Town	October 2022	
12 September 2022	CB	(England) Harrison Minturn	(England) Gloucester City	October 2022	
16 September 2022	ST	(Wales) George Cowmeadow	(England) Slough Town	October 2022	
23 September 2022	CAM	(Italy) Mo Dabre	(England) Banbury United	October 2022	
22 October 2022	CB	(England) Harrison Minturn	(England) Chippenham Town	December 2022	
29 October 2022	ST	(England) Harry Parsons	(England) Chippenham Town	January 2023	
10 November 2022	ST	(Wales) George Cowmeadow	(England) Kidlington	January 2023	
11 November 2022	CAM	(Italy) Mo Dabre	(England) Worthing	January 2023	
4 January 2023	CM	(England) Ricky Aguiar	(England) Torquay United	February 2023	
16 January 2023	ST	(England) Oscar Massey	(England) Plymouth Parkway	February 2023	
3 February 2023	RM	(Wales) Morgan Roberts	(England) Aldershot Town	16 March 2023	
9 February 2023	CM	(Italy) Mo Dabre	(England) Worthing	End of season	
13 February 2023	CF	(England) Harry Parsons	(England) Farnborough	End of season	
14 February 2023	CF	(Wales) George Cowmeadow	(England) Poole Town	14 March 2023	
24 February 2023	MF	(England) Tom Wynn-Davies	(England) North Leigh	End of Season	
3 March 2023	CB	(England) Shyam Taank	(England) Wantage Town	End of Season	
15 March 2023	CF	(Wales) George Cowmeadow	(England) Swindon Supermarine	End of Season	

== Squad statistics ==
=== Appearances ===
As of 8 May 2023

No.	Pos	Nat	Player	Total		League Two		FA Cup		EFL Cup		EFL Trophy	
No.	Pos	Nat	Player	Apps	Goals	Apps	Goals	Apps	Goals	Apps	Goals	Apps	Goals
1	GK	(England)	Sol Brynn	49	0	46	0	1	0	0	0	2	0
2	DF	(England)	Remeao Hutton	47	0	41+3	0	1	0	0	0	2	0
3	MF	(England)	Ellis Iandolo	26	1	17+6	1	1	0	0	0	2	0
4	DF	(Scotland)	Tom Clayton	34	1	29+3	1	0	0	1	0	1	0
5	MF	(England)	George McEachran	16	0	16	0	0	0	0	0	0	0
6	DF	(France)	Mathieu Baudry	14	0	7+5	0	1	0	0	0	1	0
7	MF	(England)	Joe Tomlinson	7	1	5+2	1	0	0	0	0	0	0
8	MF	(Wales)	Jonny Williams	39	10	35+2	10	1	0	1	0	0	0
9	FW	(England)	Tomi Adeloye	15	1	1+12	1	0	0	1	0	0+1	0
10	MF	(England)	Ronan Darcy	46	4	20+22	4	1	0	1	0	2	0
11	FW	(England)	Charlie Austin	20	9	15+5	9	0	0	0	0	0	0
12	DF	(England)	Tom Brewitt	12	0	12	0	0	0	0	0	0	0
14	FW	(England)	Oscar Massey	1	0	0	0	0	0	0+1	0	0	0
15	MF	(Wales)	Luke Jephcott	33	7	20+12	7	1	0	0	0	0	0
16	MF	(England)	Jake Cain	16	1	9+7	1	0	0	0	0	0	0
17	MF	(England)	Ricky Aguiar	13	0	1+7	0	0+1	0	1	0	3	0
18	DF	(England)	Reece Devine	2	0	1	0	0	0	0	0	1	0
19	FW	(England)	Rushian Hepburn-Murphy	24	6	15+8	5	0	0	0	0	0+1	1
20	DF	(England)	Frazer Blake-Tracy	34	1	34	1	0	0	0	0	0	0
21	MF	(England)	Dylan Kadji	13	0	5+8	0	0	0	0	0	0	0
22	MF	(England)	Marcel Lavinier	25	2	15+8	2	0+1	0	0	0	1	0
23	MF	(The Gambia)	Saidou Khan	37	1	30+5	1	1	0	0	0	1	0
24	FW	(England)	Jacob Wakeling	46	8	38+7	8	1	0	0	0	0	0
26	DF	(Wales)	Cian Harries	7	0	2+1	0	0+1	0	1	0	2	0
28	FW	(Saint Kitts and Nevis)	Tyrese Shade	44	4	16+23	4	0+1	0	1	0	3	0
29	FW	(England)	Harry Parsons	2	0	0	0	0	0	1	0	1	0
30	MF	(Italy)	Mo Dabre	3	0	0	0	0	0	0+1	0	2	0
31	DF	(England)	Harrison Minturn	11	0	3+5	0	0	0	1	0	1+1	0
32	MF	(Wales)	George Cowmeadow	2	0	0	0	0	0	1	0	0+1	0
33	MF	(Wales)	Morgan Roberts	10	0	0+7	0	0+1	0	0	0	2	0
35	MF	(England)	Anton Dworzak	4	0	0+1	0	0	0	0+1	0	0+2	0
36	DF	(England)	Sonny Hart	1	0	0	0	0	0	0	0	0+1	0
37	DF	(England)	Harvey Fox	2	0	0	0	0	0	0	0	0+2	0
38	FW	(England)	Abu Kanu	3	0	0+2	0	0	0	0	0	1	0
39	MF	(England)	Tom Wynn-Davis	1	0	0	0	0	0	0	0	0+1	0
Out on loan:
No longer at the club:
5	MF	(England)	Louis Reed	22	1	16+4	1	1	0	0	0	1	0
7	MF	(England)	Ben Gladwin	23	1	22+1	1	0	0	0	0	0	0
11	FW	(England)	Harry McKirdy	5	2	5	2	0	0	0	0	0	0
12	GK	(England)	Lewis Ward	2	0	0	0	0	0	1	0	1	0
21	DF	(England)	Angus MacDonald	16	0	16	0	0	0	0	0	0	0
34	DF	(Ireland)	Ciaran Brennan	21	0	14+3	0	1	0	0	0	3	0

== Awards ==
=== Players ===
No.	Pos.	Player	Award	Source
1	GK	(England) Sol Brynn	League Two Team Of The Week Match Day 4	
1	GK	(England) Sol Brynn	League Two Team Of The Week Match Day 9	
1	GK	(England) Sol Brynn	League Two Team Of The Week Match Day 10	
1	GK	(England) Sol Brynn	English Football League Team Of The Week Match Day 10	
1	GK	(England) Sol Brynn	League Two Team Of The Week Match Day 21	
2	DF	(England) Remeao Hutton	League Two Team Of The Week Match Day 26	
2	DF	(England) Remeao Hutton	English Football League Team Of The Week Match Day 26	
2	DF	(England) Remeao Hutton	League Two Team Of The Week Match Day 32	
8	MF	(Wales) Jonny Williams	League Two Team Of The Week Match Day 17	
8	MF	(Wales) Jonny Williams	League Two Team Of The Week Match Day 26	
15	FW	(Wales) Luke Jephcott	League Two Team Of The Week Match Day 17	
23	MF	(The Gambia) Saidou Khan	League Two Team Of The Week Match Day 26	
23	MF	(The Gambia) Saidou Khan	English Football League Team Of The Week Match Day 26	
34	DF	(Republic of Ireland) Ciaran Brennan	League Two Team Of The Week Match Day 26	
11	ST	(England) Charlie Austin	League Two Team Of The Week Match Day 27	
11	ST	(England) Charlie Austin	English Football League Team Of The Week Match Day 27	
11	ST	(England) Charlie Austin	League Two Team Of The Week Match Day 36	
11	ST	(England) Charlie Austin	English Football League Team Of The Week Match Day 36	

=== Management ===
No.	Manager	Award	Source
N/A	(England) Scott Lindsey	League Two Team Of The Week Match Day 17	
N/A	(Republic of Ireland) Gavin Gunning	League Two Team Of The Week Match Day 26	

=== Awards ===
No.	Pos.	Player	Award	Source
24	FW	(England) Jacob Wakeling	League Two Goal Of The Month	
11	ST	(England) Charlie Austin	FIFA 23 Team Of The Week 21	

=== Player of the Month ===
No.	Pos.	Player	Month	Source
1	GK	(England) Sol Brynn	August	
1	GK	(England) Sol Brynn	September	
1	GK	(England) Sol Brynn	December	
2	DF	(England) Remeao Hutton	October	
2	DF	(England) Remeao Hutton	November	
20	DF	(England) Frazer Blake-Tracy	January	
24	FW	(England) Jacob Wakeling	February	
