= Charlie Austin =

English footballer

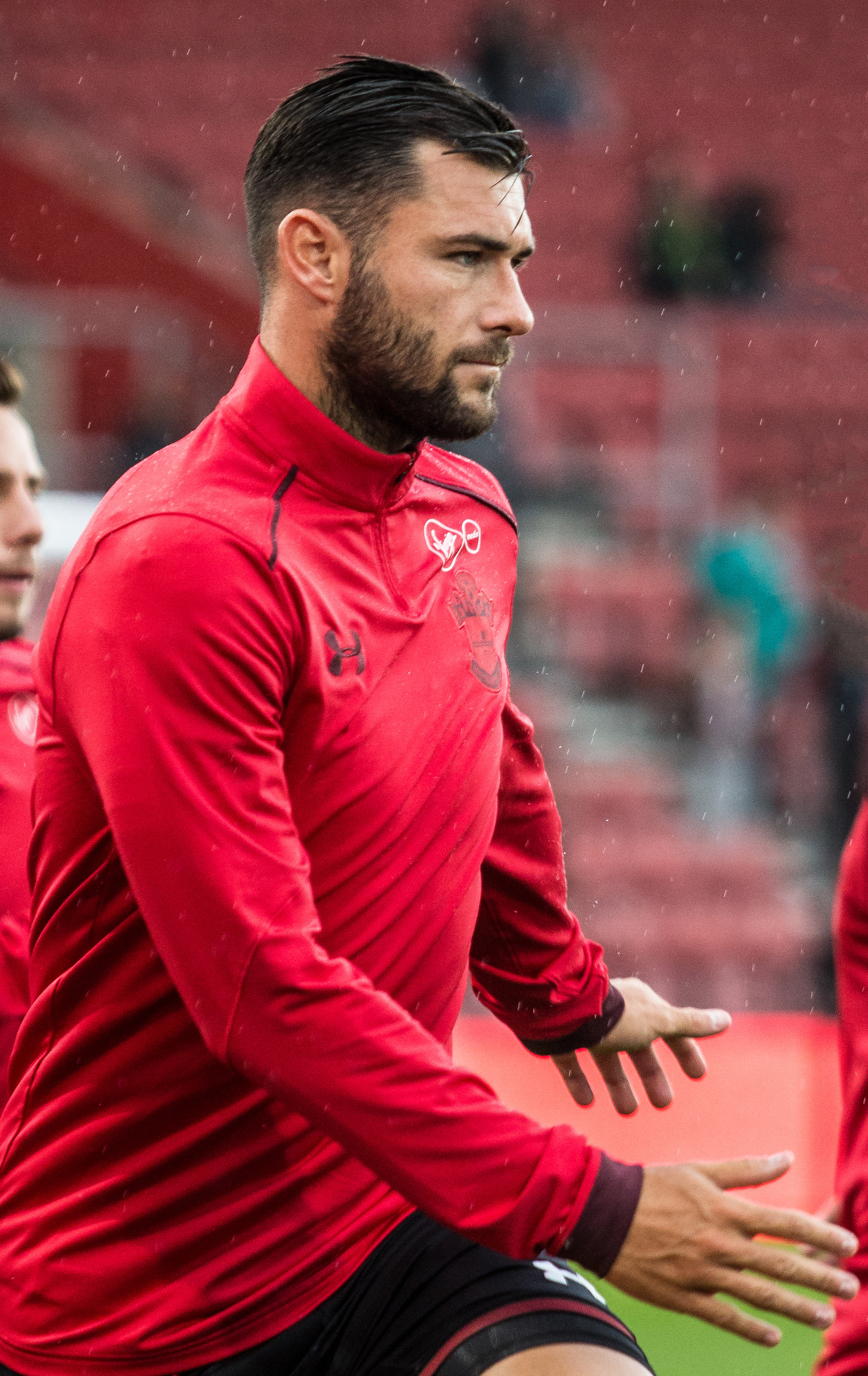
- Austin warming up for Southampton in 2017

Personal information
- Full name: Charles Austin
- Date of birth: 5 July 1989 (age 37)
- Place of birth: Hungerford, Berkshire, England
- Height: 6 ft 2 in (1.88 m)
- Position: Striker

Team information
- Current team: Hungerford Town

Youth career
- 2005: Reading

Senior career*
Years	Team	Apps	(Gls)
2006–2007	Kintbury Rangers	27	(20)
2007–2008	Hungerford Town	30	(5)
2008	Thatcham Town	0	(0)
2008–2009	Poole Town	42	(48)
2009–2011	Swindon Town	54	(31)
2011–2013	Burnley	82	(41)
2013–2016	Queens Park Rangers	82	(45)
2016–2019	Southampton	71	(16)
2019–2021	West Bromwich Albion	39	(10)
2021	→ Queens Park Rangers (loan)	21	(8)
2021–2022	Queens Park Rangers	34	(5)
2022	Brisbane Roar	7	(2)
2022–2024	Swindon Town	66	(21)
2024–2025	AFC Totton	36	(9)
2025	Basingstoke Town	4	(1)
2025–	Hungerford Town	14	(4)
- * Club domestic league appearances and goals as of 11:56, 22 March 2026 (UTC)

Charles Austin (born 5 July 1989) is an English professional footballer who plays as a striker for Southern League Premier Division South club Hungerford Town.

Released from his contract by Reading as a youth, Austin played non-league football up to May 2009, when he was signed by Swindon Town after a prolific season for Poole Town. After scoring 58 goals in 113 matches in the Football League Championship for Burnley and Queens Park Rangers, Austin made his debut in the Premier League during the 2014–15 season, scoring 18 goals for relegated Queens Park Rangers and receiving a call-up for the England national team. He returned to the Premier League in January 2016 when he signed for Southampton, scoring the winning goal against Manchester United on his debut.

== Club career ==
=== Non-league ===
Born in Hungerford, Berkshire, and attending Sir William Romney's school in Tetbury, Gloucestershire, Austin trained with Reading's youth teams as a youngster but was released for being too small when he was 15. He subsequently played for local team Kintbury Rangers and his hometown side Hungerford Town. Austin departed Hungerford in 2008 and was briefly on the books of Thatcham Town but ultimately left without making any appearances for the club.

Moving with his family to Bournemouth, he then switched to nearby semi-professional Wessex League Premier Division team Poole Town while also working as a bricklayer. In the season of 2008–09, Austin scored 46 goals in 46 appearances for Poole in all competitions.

Austin spent the pre-season of the 2009–10 season on trial with League Two club Bournemouth. Although Bournemouth's manager, Eddie Howe, was keen to sign the striker on a permanent deal, Bournemouth were unable to make a move for the striker due to a transfer embargo imposed on the club by the Football League. Austin continued to play for Poole Town, scoring 18 goals in 11 games at the beginning of the season.

=== Swindon Town ===
Austin was offered a trial at Swindon Town in September 2009 after Swindon Town's then chief scout Ken Ryder "stumbled across Charlie playing for Poole Town... and he scored four goals... and then the following week he scored three or four". After being watched for three games by the Swindon Town scouting team, Austin was asked to go on a week-long trial at Swindon Town. Austin impressed in his first reserve game against Swansea and scored a hat trick. Immediately afterwards, he was signed by Danny Wilson for an undisclosed fee and given a contract until the end of the season. He made his debut appearance for Swindon Town on 6 October in a 1–1 draw with Exeter in the 2009–10 Football League Trophy, replacing Ben Hutchinson as a substitute in the 88th minute. Austin made his Football League debut coming on in the 70th minute in the league match away at Norwich City on 24 October 2009 and on 21 November 2009, he scored his first professional goal in only the third minute of his full debut away at Carlisle United. He scored again on his full home debut three days later against Huddersfield Town, hitting the match-winner in the 59th minute for a 2–1 victory.

After forming a successful strike partnership with Billy Paynter and scoring 10 goals in 11 starts, Austin was rewarded with an extended two-and-a-half-year contract with the club in February 2010. On 14 May 2010, Austin scored the first goal as Swindon took a narrow 2–1 advantage in the first leg of the League One play-off semi-final against Charlton Athletic. In the second leg at Charlton, Swindon progressed to the final at Wembley after a penalty shoot-out in which Austin scored. Swindon lost the final 1–0 against Millwall; Austin found himself through on goal with an opportunity to equalise in the 72nd minute but shot wide after the ball bobbled on the Wembley turf as he struck the ball. At the end of his first season as a professional, Austin had scored 20 goals in 32 starts.

Despite suffering a dislocated shoulder in September, Austin scored another 17 goals in 27 games at the start of the 2010–11 season. His form prompted several Championship clubs to make offers for him during the January transfer window – all of which were rejected by Swindon. Disappointed at Swindon's reluctance to sell, Austin subsequently stated he was eager to play at a higher level and handed in a transfer request. Swindon accepted a bid from Ipswich Town just over a week later but they failed to agree personal terms with Austin and Burnley subsequently stepped in with an undisclosed fee which was also accepted.

=== Burnley ===
On 28 January 2011, Austin signed for Burnley on a three-and-a-half-year contract. He made his Burnley debut on 1 February in a 1–0 loss away to Doncaster Rovers. In his first full season with Burnley, Austin scored 16 goals in the Championship and finished the campaign as the club's top goalscorer in the league.

On 23 October 2012, Austin scored two goals in a 4–3 win over Bristol City, and subsequently equalled Ray Pointer's club record of scoring in eight consecutive appearances, which was achieved back during the 1958–59 season.

Two weeks later, on 6 November 2012, Austin broke another Burnley record as he became the quickest-ever player to reach 20 goals in a season after scoring in a 1–0 win over Leeds United — his 17th appearance of the season. The record was previously held by Bert Freeman, who scored 20 goals in his first 19 matches for the club during the 1911–12 season. He also became only the second-ever Burnley player to score 20 goals before the end of November after Andy Lochhead, who reached 20 goals in 25 games on 26 November 1966. Austin managed to get his goal tally up to 23 goals by the end of the calendar year.

On 8 July 2013, a fee was agreed between Burnley and Premier League club Hull City for Austin. However, on 9 July 2013, Austin failed his medical and Hull pulled out of the deal.

=== Queens Park Rangers ===
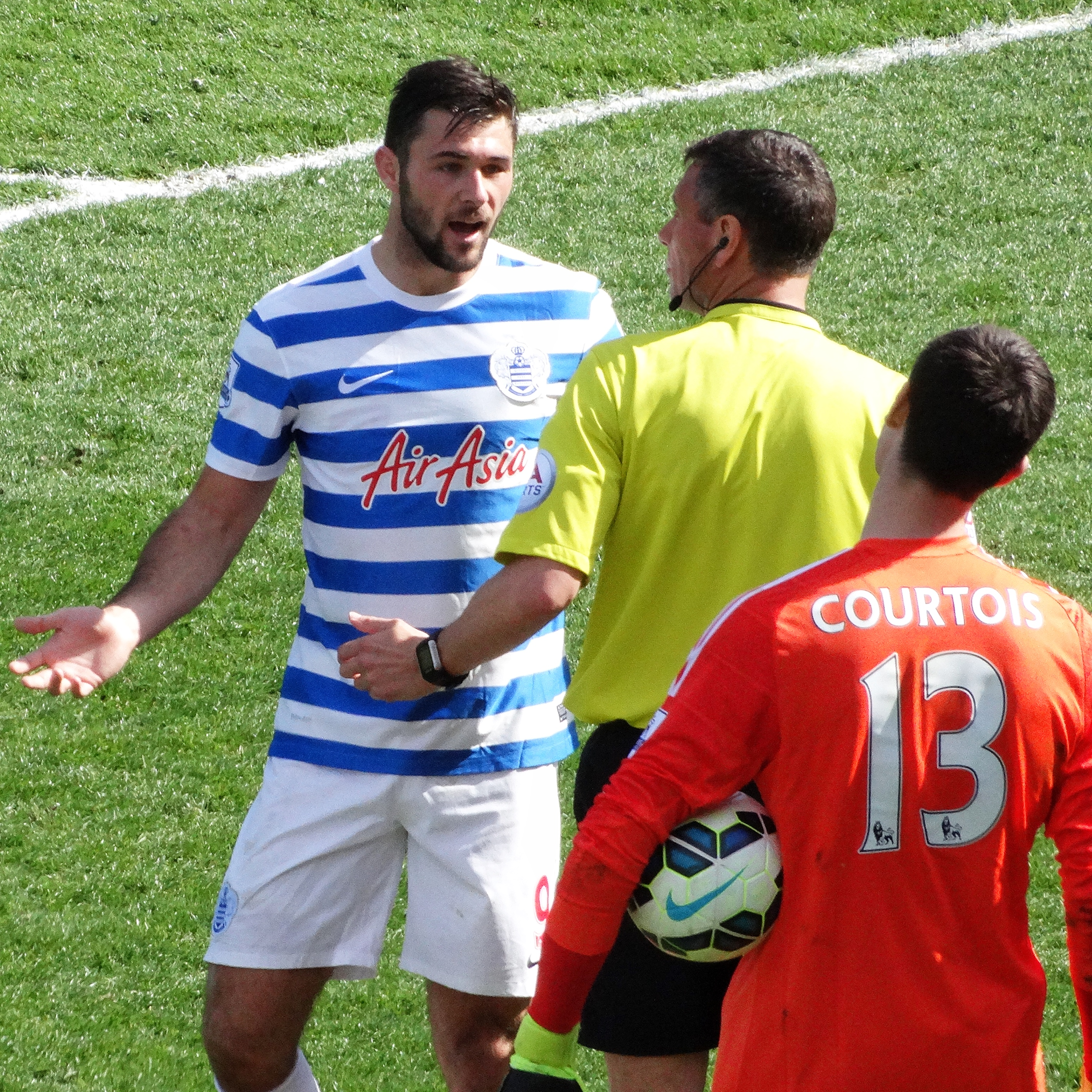
Austin (left) playing for Queens Park Rangers in 2015

Austin moved to Queens Park Rangers, on a three-year deal on 1 August 2013, for an undisclosed fee. He scored his first goal for QPR in a League Cup tie against Exeter City on 6 August 2013. On 14 September 2013, Austin scored his first league goal for QPR in a 1–0 win over Birmingham City at Loftus Road. On 28 September 2013, he scored a penalty in a 2–0 win at home to Middlesbrough. On 5 October 2013, he scored two goals including a penalty in a 2–0 win at home to Barnsley which increased his goal tally in the home and away season to 6. He scored his 100th professional goal and his 18th of the season in a 3–2 win over Barnsley. His 20th goal of the 2013–14 season sent QPR to Wembley as his team beat Wigan Athletic 2–1 on 12 May 2014.

On 6 December 2014, Austin scored against former club Burnley in a 2–0 win, but was later sent off for a second booking. Two weeks later, he scored his first Premier League hat-trick in a 3–2 win over West Bromwich Albion, bringing his league tally for the season up to 11. With five goals in five games in December 2014, he was awarded the Premier League Player of the Month award, becoming only the second QPR player to do so. By scoring a league hat-trick for QPR, Austin became the first Rangers player in more than ten years to achieve the feat, last performed by Jamie Cureton on 28 September 2004. On 24 May, Austin scored QPR's goal in a 5–1 final day defeat to Leicester City to finish the season as the fourth top goal scorer in the Premier League, with 18 goals.

=== Southampton ===
On 16 January 2016, Austin returned to the Premier League, joining Southampton on a four-and-a-half-year deal for a reported fee of £4 million. He made his debut for the club a week later against Manchester United, coming on as a second-half substitute for Sadio Mané, and scored a late winner, turning in a free-kick from James Ward-Prowse.

He scored his first two goals of the 2016–17 season on 15 September in a 3–0 Europa League win over Sparta Prague and went on to score four goals in a week, with goals against Swansea City in the Premier League and Crystal Palace in the EFL Cup. In Southampton's next Premier League fixture, at West Ham United, manager Claude Puel inserted Austin in the starting lineup over Shane Long, and Austin provided the first goal as well as an assist in the 3–0 victory.

On 23 December, Austin scored the opening goal in the 24th minute of a 1–1 draw with Huddersfield Town. Shortly afterwards, he caught Huddersfield keeper Jonas Lössl in the face with his boot. Late in the match, Austin went off with a hamstring injury which resulted in him being sidelined for several weeks. The following day, the Football Association gave Austin a three-match suspension for violent conduct.

=== West Bromwich Albion ===
Austin signed for Championship club West Bromwich Albion on 8 August 2019 on a two-year contract for a £4 million fee. He scored on his debut for West Brom in an EFL Cup tie against Millwall on 13 August 2019. Austin scored his first league goal for West Brom on 5 October 2019 against Cardiff City in a 4–2 win. Austin finished the 2019–20 season as the club's top scorer with 11 goals in all competitions, helping secure West Brom's return to the Premier league.

On 27 May 2021, it was announced that Charlie Austin would leave the club following the conclusion of his contract thus ending a 2-year stint at the club.

=== Return to QPR, and Brisbane Roar ===
On 9 January 2021, Austin rejoined Championship side Queens Park Rangers on loan for the remainder of the 2020–21 season. He made his debut on 12 January, scoring in a 2–0 victory at Luton Town. On 2 June, Austin returned to QPR permanently, signing a two-year deal. He scored his first goal since re-joining the club permanently with a last minute equaliser at home to Barnsley on 21 August. Austin left Queens Park Rangers at the end of the 2021–22 season after not making enough appearances to trigger a contract extension.

On 27 June 2022 Austin signed a multi-year contract for A-League Men side Brisbane Roar. He made his debut in the Australia Cup against Heidelberg United and scored in the penalty shootout. On 14 December, Austin left Brisbane after requesting a mutual termination of his contract, citing "family related reasons". Austin made 11 appearances and scored 4 goals for Brisbane Roar across all competitions.

=== Return to Swindon Town ===
On 30 December 2022, Austin returned to Swindon Town on a contract until the end of the 2022–23 season. Austin scored all four goals for Swindon in a 4–4 draw with Rochdale in March 2023. In May 2023, he signed a new one-year contract extension. In May 2024, he was released by Swindon Town, alongside ten other players.

=== AFC Totton ===
In July 2024, Austin returned to non-league football to sign for Southern League Premier Division side AFC Totton. On 4 July 2025, Austin departed the club after one season.

=== Basingstoke Town ===
In August 2025, Austin signed for Southern League Premier Division South side Basingstoke Town. He made his debut in a league match with Wimborne Town on 9 August 2025, scoring his first goal for the club to wrap up a 2–0 win. Having suffered an injury, he departed the club on 31 October 2025 following an approach from Hungerford Town.

=== Hungerford Town ===
Austin made his league debut for Hungerford a week after joining the club, coming on as a second-half substitute in a 0–0 draw with Wimborne Town on 8 November 2025.

== International career ==
On 21 May 2015, Austin was called up for the first time to the England national football team for a friendly match against the Republic of Ireland and a UEFA Euro 2016 qualifying match against Slovenia. He and Leicester City forward Jamie Vardy were called up due to several other forwards being involved in the European Under-21 Championship, but Austin did not feature in either match.

== Personal life ==
Austin and his wife Bianca Austin (née Parker) have a daughter, born in August 2012 to a surrogate.

Austin was found guilty of assault in 2013 after he punched a man who had accused him of taking drugs in a Swindon nightclub toilet cubicle. He was fined £1,801 and ordered to pay £1,320 in costs.

In 2024, Austin was diagnosed with combined ADHD. As a professional footballer he was unable to take appropriate medication as these were on the World Anti-Doping Agency prohibited list.

== Career statistics ==
As of match played 21 March 2026

Appearances and goals by club, season and competition
Club	Season	League			National cup (Note: Includes FA Cup, Australia Cup)		League cup (Note: Includes EFL Cup)		Other		Total	
Club	Season	Division	Apps	Goals	Apps	Goals	Apps	Goals	Apps	Goals	Apps	Goals
Kintbury Rangers	2006–07	Hellenic League Division One East	27	20	0	0	—		1 (Note: Appearance in Hellenic League Supplementary Cup)	1	28	21
Hungerford Town	2007–08	Hellenic League Premier Division	30	5	0	0	—		7 (Note: One appearance and three goals in Hellenic Floodlit Challenge Cup, six appearances and three goals in Hellenic Challenge Cup)	6	37	11
Poole Town	2008–09	Wessex League Premier Division	34	34	4	4	—		8 (Note: One appearance and one goal in FA Vase, three appearances and four goals in Dorset Senior Cup, four appearances and three goals in Wessex League Cup)	8	46	46
Poole Town	2009–10	Wessex League Premier Division	8	14	3	4	—		0	0	11	18
Poole Town	Total		42	48	7	8	—		8	8	57	64
Swindon Town	2009–10	League One	33	19	—		—		5 (Note: Two appearances in Football League Trophy, three appearances and one goal in League One play-offs)	1	38	20
Swindon Town	2010–11	League One	21	12	3	3	1	0	2 (Note: Appearances in Football League Trophy)	2	27	17
Swindon Town	Total		54	31	3	3	1	0	7	3	65	37
Burnley	2010–11	Championship	4	0	—		—		—		4	0
Burnley	2011–12	Championship	41	16	1	0	4	1	—		46	17
Burnley	2012–13	Championship	37	25	0	0	3	3	—		40	28
Burnley	Total		82	41	1	0	7	4	—		90	45
Queens Park Rangers	2013–14	Championship	31	17	1	0	2	1	3 (Note: Appearances in Championship play-offs)	2	37	20
Queens Park Rangers	2014–15	Premier League	35	18	1	0	0	0	—		36	18
Queens Park Rangers	2015–16	Championship	16	10	0	0	0	0	—		16	10
Queens Park Rangers	Total		82	45	2	0	2	1	3	2	89	48
Southampton	2015–16	Premier League	7	1	0	0	0	0	—		7	1
Southampton	2016–17	Premier League	15	6	0	0	1	1	5 (Note: Appearances in UEFA Europa League)	2	21	9
Southampton	2017–18	Premier League	24	7	1	0	1	0	—		26	7
Southampton	2018–19	Premier League	25	2	1	0	1	1	—		27	3
Southampton	Total		71	16	2	0	3	2	5	2	81	20
West Bromwich Albion	2019–20	Championship	34	10	3	0	1	1	—		38	11
West Bromwich Albion	2020–21	Premier League	5	0	0	0	2	0	—		7	0
West Bromwich Albion	Total		39	10	3	0	3	1	—		45	11
Queens Park Rangers	2020–21	Championship	21	8	0	0	0	0	—		21	8
Queens Park Rangers	2021–22	Championship	34	5	2	0	2	2	—		38	7
Queens Park Rangers	Total		55	13	2	0	2	2	—		59	15
Brisbane Roar	2022–23	A-League Men	7	2	4	2	—		—		11	4
Swindon Town	2022–23	League Two	20	9	0	0	0	0	—		20	9
Swindon Town	2023–24	League Two	46	12	1	2	1	0	0	0	48	14
Swindon Town	Total		66	21	1	2	1	0	0	0	68	23
AFC Totton	2024–25	Southern League Premier Division South	36	9	1	0	—		7 (Note: One appearance and one goal in Hampshire Senior Cup, four appearances and two goals in FA Trophy, two appearances and one goal in Southern League Premier Division South play-offs)	4	44	13
Basingstoke Town	2025–26	Southern League Premier Division South	4	1	0	0	—		0	0	4	1
Hungerford Town	2025–26	Southern League Premier Division South	14	4	0	0	—		0	0	14	4
Career total			609	266	26	15	19	10	38	26	692	317

== Honours ==
Queens Park Rangers

- Football League Championship play-offs: 2014

Southampton

- EFL Cup runner-up: 2016–17

AFC Totton

- Southern League Premier Division South play-offs: 2024–25

Individual

- Premier League Player of the Month: December 2014
