= Marcel Lavinier =

English-Portuguese footballer

Personal information
- Full name: Marcel Edwin Rodrigues Lavinier
- Date of birth: 16 December 2000 (age 25)
- Place of birth: London, England
- Height: 1.80 m (5 ft 11 in)
- Position: Defender

Team information
- Current team: Farnham Town
- Number: 24

Youth career
- 2007–2020: Chelsea
- 2020–2021: Tottenham Hotspur

Senior career*
Years	Team	Apps	(Gls)
2021–2022	Tottenham Hotspur	0	(0)
2022–2023	Swindon Town	23	(2)
2023–2025	Forest Green Rovers	20	(0)
2025	Yeovil Town	8	(0)
2025–2026	Boston United	28	(0)
2026–	Farnham Town	5	(1)

International career^{‡}
2015–2016	England U16	2	(0)
2016	England U17	3	(0)
- * Club domestic league appearances and goals as of 13:22, 3 May 2026 (UTC) ‡ National team caps and goals as of 22:00, 24 February 2021 (UTC)

Marcel Edwin Rodrigues Lavinier (born 16 December 2000) is a professional footballer who plays as a right-back for National League South club Farnham Town.

== Club career ==
On 24 February 2021, Lavinier made his first-team debut for Spurs in the Europa League as a substitute for Matt Doherty in a 4–0 home win over Wolfsberger AC in the second leg of the round of 32 tie.

On 1 September 2022, Lavinier signed for Swindon Town. In the 2022-23 season, Marcel Lavinier won Swindon Goal of the Season, through a fan poll on Twitter. On 3 August 2023, Lavinier moved on to Forest Green Rovers.

On 7 March 2025, Lavinier signed for National League side Yeovil Town until the end of the 2024–25 season.

In October 2025, Lavinier signed for National League side Boston United on a short-term deal.

On 14 October 2026, following his release from Boston United in the summer, Lavinier joined National League South side Farnham Town.

== International career ==
Lavinier has represented England at youth international level but has also spent time training with Portugal U18s.

== Career statistics ==
As of 14 November 2026

Appearances and goals by club, season and competition
Club	Season	League			FA Cup		EFL Cup		Other		Total	
Club	Season	Division	Apps	Goals	Apps	Goals	Apps	Goals	Apps	Goals	Apps	Goals
Chelsea U21	2019–20	—			—		—		3 (Note: Appearance(s) in EFL Trophy)	0	3	0
Tottenham Hotspur	2020–21	Premier League	0	0	0	0	0	0	1 (Note: Appearance in UEFA Europa League)	0	1	0
Tottenham Hotspur	2021–22	Premier League	0	0	0	0	0	0	0	0	0	0
Tottenham Hotspur	Total		0	0	0	0	0	0	1	0	1	0
Tottenham Hotspur U21	2021–22	—			—		—		1	0	1	0
Swindon Town	2022–23	League Two	23	2	1	0	0	0	1	0	25	2
Forest Green Rovers	2023–24	League Two	14	0	0	0	0	0	1	0	15	0
Forest Green Rovers	2024–25	National League	6	0	1	0	—		4 (Note: Appearance(s) in National League Cup)	0	11	0
Forest Green Rovers	Total		20	0	1	0	0	0	5	0	26	0
Yeovil Town	2024–25	National League	8	0	—		—		—		8	0
Boston United	2025–26	National League	28	0	1	0	—		2 (Note: One appearance in FA Trophy, one appearance in National League Cup)	0	31	0
Farnham Town	2026–27	National League South	5	1	—		—		1 (Note: Appearance(s) in FA Trophy)	0	6	1
Career total			84	3	3	0	0	0	14	0	101	3
