= George Cowmeadow =

Welsh footballer

Personal information
- Full name: George Ross Cowmeadow
- Date of birth: 3 November 2003 (age 22)
- Place of birth: Basingstoke
- Height: 5 ft 11 in (1.80 m)
- Position: Forward

Team information
- Current team: Ardley United FC

Youth career
- –2014: Thatcham Town Harriers
- 2014–2021: Swindon Town

Senior career*
Years	Team	Apps	(Gls)
2021–2023	Swindon Town	0	(0)
2022	→ Slough Town (loan)	1	(0)
2022–2023	→ Kidlington (loan)	5	(0)
2023	→ Poole Town (loan)	4	(0)
2023	Swindon Town Supermarines	4	
2023-2024	Kidlington Town Fc		
- * Club domestic league appearances and goals as of 17:31, 27 September 2023 (UTC)

George Ross Cowmeadow (born 3 November 2003) is an English professional footballer who plays as a forward for Ardley United FC

.

== Club career ==
Prior to his move to Swindon Town in 2014, Cowmeadow played for Thatcham Town Harriers up to under-11 level. He followed this by signing for Swindon Town's academy. After participating during the club's 2021–22 pre-season, he went on to make his debut for the club in their EFL Trophy group-stage tie against Plymouth Argyle on 12 October 2021, replacing Rob Hunt in the 63rd minute as The Robins secured a 3–1 victory.

On 16 September 2022, Cowmeadow joined National League South club Slough Town on a one-month loan deal and later made his debut as a substitute in the 2-0 loss against Hemel Hempstead and later, on 10 November 2022, he joined Southern League Division One Central side Kidlington on loan until the end of January 2023. In February 2023, he joined Poole Town on a one-month loan deal. In March 2023, he joined Swindon Supermarine on loan until the end of the season.

Cowmeadow was released by Swindon Town in July 2023 and signed for Kidlingon shortly afterwards.

Cowmeadow was making an impact at Kidlington until he suffered a serious ankle injury, requiring surgery and putting him out for over a year.

After recovering from the injury Cowmeadow signed for Ardley United. He made an immediate impact, scoring 4 goals in 3 appearances at the start of the season.

== International career ==
In February 2020, Cowmeadow received a maiden call-up to a Wales U17 preparation camp.

== Career statistics ==
As of match played 22 April 2023

Appearances and goals by club, season and competition
Club	Season	League			FA Cup		League Cup		Other		Total	
Club	Season	Division	Apps	Goals	Apps	Goals	Apps	Goals	Apps	Goals	Apps	Goals
Swindon Town	2021–22	League Two	0	0	0	0	0	0	1 (Note: Appearance in the EFL Trophy)	0	1	0
Swindon Town	2022–23	League Two	0	0	0	0	1	0	1	0	2	0
Swindon Town	Total		0	0	0	0	1	0	2	0	3	0
Slough Town (loan)	2022–23	National League South	1	0	1	0	—		0	0	2	0
Kidlington (loan)	2022–23	Southern League Division One Central	5	0	—		—		—		5	0
Poole Town (loan)	2022–23	Southern League Premier Division South	4	0	—		—		—		4	0
Swindon Supermarine (loan)	2022–23	Southern League Premier Division South	5	0	—		—		—		5	0
Kidlington Town	2023-2024	Premier Division North										
Ardley United	2025 - present	Combined Counties Premier League - North	4	3	2	0			1	2	7	4
Career total			19	3	3	0	2	0	3	2	26	4
