= Ciaran Brennan =

Irish footballer (born 2000)

Ciarán Brennan
Personal information
- Full name: Ciarán Thomas Brennan
- Date of birth: 5 May 2000 (age 26)
- Place of birth: Sheffield, England
- Height: 1.89 m (6 ft 2 in)
- Positions: Defender; midfielder

Team information
- Current team: Newport County
- Number: 6

Youth career
- 2013–2018: Sheffield Wednesday

Senior career*
Years	Team	Apps	(Gls)
2018–2024	Sheffield Wednesday	11	(0)
2019	→ Gainsborough Trinity (loan)	4	(0)
2021	→ Notts County (loan)	4	(0)
2022–2023	→ Swindon Town (loan)	17	(0)
2023–2024	→ Hartlepool United (loan)	4	(0)
2024–	Newport County	66	(0)

International career^{‡}
2017	Republic of Ireland U18	2	(0)
2019	Republic of Ireland U19	1	(0)
- * Club domestic league appearances and goals as of 14:49, 21 November 2026 (UTC) ‡ National team caps and goals as of 12:57, 16 September 2020 (UTC)

Ciarán Thomas Brennan (born 5 May 2000) is a professional footballer who plays as a defender or midfielder for EFL League Two club Newport County. He is a former Republic of Ireland under-19 international.

== Career ==
=== Sheffield Wednesday ===
Brennan joined Sheffield Wednesday in 2013, joining the U14 group, before progressing through the club's youth academies. He would sign his first professional contract on 3 May 2018, later renewing his contract at the club for a further year at the end of 2019 season and again in 2020. On 15 September 2020, he would make his first team debut at Sheffield Wednesday, starting the game against Rochdale in the second round of the EFL Cup. The club activated a one-year extension to his contract on 20 May 2021. After his Notts County loan, he would break into the first time on a more regular basis, which would see him sign a new contract until the summer of 2024. On 17 May 2024, it was confirmed he would be released following the expiration of his contract.

==== Loan Spells ====
On the 20 September 2019, Brennan was sent out on a one-month loan to Gainsborough Trinity, which would see him play five games before returning to Sheffield Wednesday with the club's player of the month award. On 22 September 2021, Brennan joined Notts County on a short-term loan until 27 November. The loan was cut short on 8 November 2021 after featuring 5 times in all competition. On 1 July, it was announced that Brennan had joined Swindon Town on loan for the season. He made his Swindon debut against Harrogate Town on the opening day of the season. He would pick up a season-ending shoulder injury against Harrogate Town on 25 February 2023 and would return to his parent club. On 4 December 2023, Brennan joined Hartlepool United on a short-term loan. He made his Hartlepool debut on 9 December in a 5–1 FA Trophy win against City of Liverpool. On 5 January 2024, it was announced that his loan spell with Hartlepool had ended.

=== Newport County ===
On 25 June 2024, Newport County announced Brennan would join them on 1 July 2024, signing a two-year deal. He made his debut for Newport on 10 August 2024 in the 3-2 EFL League Two defeat to Cheltenham Town. In June 2026 Brennan accepted a contract extension at Newport.

== International career ==
Brennan got his maiden call-up to the Republic of Ireland U21 team for the first time on 25 May 2021 to play in games against Switzerland, Denmark and Australia. However, he would later have to withdraw from the squad due to illness.

== Career statistics ==
As of 21 November 2026

Appearances and goals by club, season and competition
Club	Season	League			FA Cup		League Cup		Other		Total	
Club	Season	Division	Apps	Goals	Apps	Goals	Apps	Goals	Apps	Goals	Apps	Goals
Sheffield Wednesday	2019–20	Championship	0	0	0	0	0	0	0	0	0	0
Sheffield Wednesday	2020–21	Championship	0	0	2	0	2	0	0	0	4	0
Sheffield Wednesday	2021–22	League One	11	0	0	0	0	0	3 (Note: Appearance(s) in EFL Trophy)	0	14	0
Sheffield Wednesday	2022–23	League One	0	0	0	0	0	0	0	0	0	0
Sheffield Wednesday	2023–24	Championship	0	0	0	0	0	0	0	0	0	0
Sheffield Wednesday	Total		11	0	2	0	2	0	3	0	18	0
Gainsborough Trinity (loan)	2019–20	Northern Premier League	4	0	1	0	0	0	0	0	5	0
Notts County (loan)	2021–22	National League	4	0	1	0	0	0	0	0	5	0
Swindon Town (loan)	2022–23	League Two	17	0	1	0	0	0	3	0	21	0
Hartlepool United (loan)	2023–24	National League	4	0	0	0	0	0	1 (Note: Appearances in FA Trophy)	0	5	0
Newport County	2024–25	League Two	27	0	1	0	1	0	2	0	31	0
Newport County	2025–26	League Two	23	0	2	0	1	0	3	0	29	0
Newport County	2026–27	League Two	16	0	1	0	1	0	1	0	19	0
Newport County	Total		66	0	4	0	3	0	6	0	77	0
Career total			106	0	9	0	5	0	13	0	133	0
