= Jacob Wakeling =

English footballer

Personal information
- Full name: Jacob Andrew Wakeling
- Date of birth: 15 September 2001 (age 25)
- Place of birth: Redditch, England
- Position: Striker

Team information
- Current team: Solihull Moors

Youth career
- West Bromwich Albion

Senior career*
Years	Team	Apps	(Gls)
2020	Alvechurch	7	(5)
2020–2022	Leicester City	0	(0)
2022	→ Barrow (loan)	4	(0)
2022–2023	Swindon Town	47	(8)
2023–2025	Peterborough United	8	(0)
2024–2025	→ Gillingham (loan)	16	(1)
2025–	Solihull Moors	25	(7)
- * Club domestic league appearances and goals as of 18:08, 22 March 2026 (UTC)

Jacob Andrew Wakeling (born 15 September 2001) is an English professional footballer who last plays as a striker for Solihull Moors.

== Career ==
=== Early career ===
Wakeling began his career with West Bromwich Albion, being released by them in 2020. After playing in non-league football for Alvechurch, Wakeling signed for Leicester City in November 2020, before moving on loan to Barrow in January 2022. Wakeling played four times for Barrow before returning to Leicester, from where he was released as a player in June 2022.

=== Swindon Town ===
In July 2022 he signed for Swindon Town after previously being on trial at the club. After scoring 4 goals and making 3 assists in his first 10 league games, on 30 September 2022, Wakeling signed a contract extension keeping him at Swindon Town until 2026.

=== Peterborough United ===
On 1 September 2023, Wakeling signed with EFL League One club Peterborough United on a three-year contract for an undisclosed fee.

Ahead of the 2023–24 season, Wakeling joined Gillingham on a season-long loan. He scored on his debut for the team, scoring the second in a 4-1 home win over Carlisle United.

On 6 May 2025, Peterborough announced the player had been transfer listed.

On 1 September 2025, it was announced that Wakeling had left the club.

=== Solihull Moors ===
On 2 September 2025, Wakeling joined Solihull Moors of the National League.

== Career statistics ==
As of match played 1 April 2025

Appearances and goals by club, season and competition
Club	Season	League			FA Cup		EFL Cup		Other		Total	
Club	Season	Division	Apps	Goals	Apps	Goals	Apps	Goals	Apps	Goals	Apps	Goals
Alvechurch	2020–21	Southern League Premier Division Central	7	5	3	2	–		1 (Note: Appearance(s) in FA Trophy)	0	11	7
Leicester City U21	2020–21	–	–		–		–		1 (Note: Appearance(s) in EFL Trophy)	1	1	1
Leicester City U21	2021–22	–	–		–		–		2	1	2	1
Leicester City U21	Total		–		–		–		3	2	3	2
Barrow (loan)	2021–22	League Two	4	0	0	0	0	0	0	0	4	0
Swindon Town	2022–23	League Two	45	8	1	0	0	0	0	0	46	8
Swindon Town	2023–24	League Two	2	0	0	0	1	0	1	0	4	0
Swindon Town	Total		47	8	1	0	1	0	1	0	50	8
Peterborough United	2023–24	League One	8	0	0	0	0	0	0	0	8	0
Gillingham (loan)	2024–25	League Two	16	1	1	0	1	0	1	0	19	1
Career total			82	14	5	2	2	0	6	2	95	18
