= Oscar Massey =

English association football player

Personal information
- Full name: Oscar Massey
- Date of birth: 14 January 2004 (age 22)
- Place of birth: Truro, England
- Position: Forward

Team information
- Current team: Falmouth Town

Youth career
- –2014: Truro City
- 2014–2022: Plymouth Argyle

Senior career*
Years	Team	Apps	(Gls)
2021–2022	Plymouth Argyle	0	(0)
2022–2023	Swindon Town	0	(0)
2022	→ Hungerford Town (loan)	0	(0)
2022	→ Wantage Town (loan)	1	(1)
2023	→ Plymouth Parkway (loan)	5	(0)
2023	→ Tavistock (loan)	8	(0)
2023	Penzance	8	(6)
2023	Barnstaple Town	4	(6)
2023–2024	Falmouth Town	39	(28)
2024–2025	Mousehole	31	(10)
2025–	Falmouth Town	35	(17)
- * Club domestic league appearances and goals as of 22:30, 9 August (UTC)

Oscar Massey (born 14 January 2004) is an English professional footballer who plays as a forward for Falmouth Town

== Career ==
Massey started his career at Truro City, before joining Plymouth Argyle's youth system. He made his senior professional debut, aged 17, starting and playing 69 minutes of Plymouth's 2–0 defeat at Newport County in an EFL Trophy group stage game on 31 August 2021.

He moved to Swindon Town in June 2022. He made his Swindon debut the following month in the 2-0 EFL Cup loss against Walsall on 9 August 2022.

During the 2022/23 season, Massey spent time out on loan with Hungerford Town and Wantage Town. Loan moves to Plymouth Parkway and Tavistock followed before his release by Swindon Town at the end of the 2022/23 season.

Massey subsequently joined Penzance in the summer of 2023 before joining Barnstaple Town in September and then Falmouth Town in the December.

In December 2024 Massey joined Mousehole

== Career statistics ==
As of match played 10 August 2022

Appearances and goals by club, season and competition
Club	Season	League			National cup		League cup		Other		Total	
Club	Season	Division	Apps	Goals	Apps	Goals	Apps	Goals	Apps	Goals	Apps	Goals
Plymouth Argyle	2021–22	League One	0	0	0	0	0	0	1	0	1	0
Plymouth Argyle	Total		0	0	0	0	0	0	1	0	1	0
Swindon Town	2022–23	League Two	0	0	0	0	1	0	0	0	1	0
Total			0	0	0	0	1	0	0	0	1	0
Career total			0	0	0	0	1	0	1	0	2	0
