= 2018–19 Swindon Town F.C. season =

Swindon Town
2018–19 season
- Chairman: Lee Power
- Manager: Phil Brown (until 12 November); Richie Wellens (from 13 November)
- Stadium: County Ground
- League Two: 13th
- FA Cup: Second round (vs. Woking)
- EFL Cup: First round (vs. Forest Green Rovers)
- EFL Trophy: Group stage (3rd in group)
- Top goalscorer: League: Michael Doughty (5 goals); All: Michael Doughty (6 goals)
- Highest home attendance: 8,676 vs Notts County (4 May 2019)
- Lowest home attendance: 1,569 vs Chelsea U23s (7 August 2018)
- Average home league attendance: 7,024
| Home colours | Away colours |

The 2018–19 season is Swindon Town's 140th season in their existence, and second season back in League Two following relegation from League One. The season covers the period from 1 July 2018 through to 30 June 2019.

== Players ==
=== First Team Squad ===
As of 27 October 2018

| No. | Name | Nat | Position | Since | Date of birth (age) | Signed from | Games | Goals |
Goalkeepers
| 1 | Lawrence Vigouroux | (Chile) | GK | 2016 | 19 November 1993 (age 32) | (England) Liverpool | 110 | 0 |
| 12 | Will Henry | (England) | GK | 2015 | 6 July 1998 (age 28) | Academy | 10 | 0 |
| 23 | Luke McCormick | (England) | GK | 2018 | 15 August 1983 (age 43) | (England) Plymouth Argyle | 10 | 0 |
Defenders
| 2 | Kyle Knoyle | (England) | RB | 2017 | 24 September 1996 (age 29) | (England) West Ham United | 38 | 0 |
| 5 | Sid Nelson | (England) | CB | 2018 | 1 January 1996 (age 30) | (England) Millwall | 13 | 0 |
| 6 | Olly Lancashire | (England) | CB/DM | 2017 | 13 December 1988 (age 37) | (England) Shrewsbury Town | 57 | 2 |
| 15 | Chris Robertson | (Scotland) | CB | 2017 | 11 October 1986 (age 39) | (England) AFC Wimbledon | 22 | 1 |
| 25 | Joe Romanski | (England) | CB | 2017 | 3 February 2000 (age 26) | Academy | 9 | 1 |
| 26 | Dion Conroy | (England) | CB/DM | 2017 | 11 December 1995 (age 30) | (England) Chelsea | 28 | 0 |
| 32 | Luke Woolfenden | (England) | CB/RB | 2018 | 21 October 1998 (age 27) | (England) Ipswich Town | 9 | 1 |
Midfielders
| 3 | Michael Doughty | (Wales) | CM/LM/LB | 2018 | 20 November 1992 (age 33) | (England) Peterborough United | 49 | 15 |
| 4 | Jak McCourt | (England) | CM/DM | 2018 | 6 July 1995 (age 31) | (England) Chesterfield | 11 | 0 |
| 7 | Jermaine McGlashan | (England) | RM/LM/AM | 2018 | 14 October 1988 (age 37) | (England) Southend United | 18 | 0 |
| 8 | James Dunne | (England) | CM/DM | 2017 | 18 September 1989 (age 36) | (England) Cambridge United | 57 | 1 |
| 11 | Steven Alzate | (England) | AM/SS | 2018 | 8 September 1998 (age 28) | (England) Brighton & Hove Albion | 18 | 2 |
| 14 | Ellis Iandolo | (England) | LM/LB/CM | 2015 | 22 August 1997 (age 29) | (England) Maidstone United | 54 | 2 |
| 16 | Martin Smith | (England) | CM/DM/AM | 2018 | 2 October 1995 (age 30) | (Northern Ireland) Coleraine | 11 | 0 |
| 20 | Toumani Diagouraga | (France) | DM/CM | 2018 | 9 June 1987 (age 39) | (England) Fleetwood Town | 21 | 0 |
| 21 | Jordan Young | (Scotland) | AM | 2015 | 31 July 1999 (age 27) | Academy | 7 | 1 |
| 31 | Matt Taylor | (England) | LM/CM/LB | 2017 | 27 November 1981 (age 44) | (England) Northampton Town | 57 | 9 |
Forwards
| 9 | Marc Richards | (England) | CF | 2018 | 8 July 1982 (age 44) | (England) Northampton Town | 35 | 13 |
| 10 | Keshi Anderson | (England) | SS/LW/RW | 2018 | 6 April 1995 (age 31) | (England) Crystal Palace | 59 | 7 |
| 17 | Elijah Adebayo | (England) | CF | 2018 | 7 January 1998 (age 28) | (England) Fulham | 19 | 4 |
| 22 | Kaiyne Woolery | (England) | SS/RW/LW | 2017 | 11 January 1995 (age 31) | (England) Wigan Athletic | 47 | 6 |
| 24 | Scott Twine | (England) | CF | 2016 | 14 July 1999 (age 27) | Academy | 12 | 0 |
| 28 | Sol Pryce | (England) | CF | 2018 | 30 January 2000 (age 26) | Academy | 1 | 0 |

== Transfers ==
=== Transfers in ===
| Date from | Position | Nationality | Name | From | Fee | Ref. |
|---|---|---|---|---|---|---|
| 1 July 2018 | RM | (England) | Jermaine McGlashan | Southend United | Free transfer | |
| 7 July 2018 | GK | (England) | Luke McCormick | Plymouth Argyle | Free transfer | |
| 7 July 2018 | CM | (England) | Martin Smith | (Northern Ireland) Coleraine | Free transfer | |
| 17 July 2018 | CM | (England) | Jak McCourt | Chesterfield | Free transfer | |
| 18 July 2018 | DM | (France) | Toumani Diagouraga | Fleetwood Town | Undisclosed | |
| 23 July 2018 | CM | (Wales) | Michael Doughty | Peterborough United | Free transfer | |
| 17 January 2019 | CM | (England) | Danny Rose | Portsmouth | Undisclosed | |
| 18 January 2019 | CB | (England) | Tom Broadbent | Bristol Rovers | Undisclosed | |
| 24 January 2019 | CB | (England) | Taylor Curran | Southend United | Undisclosed | |
| 31 January 2019 | DM | (Australia) | Cameron McGilp | Birmingham City | Undisclosed | |

=== Transfers out ===
| Date from | Position | Nationality | Name | To | Fee | Ref. |
|---|---|---|---|---|---|---|
| 1 July 2018 | GK | (England) | Reice Charles-Cook | (Denmark) SønderjyskE | Released | |
| 1 July 2018 | CB | (England) | Paolo Giamattei | Egham Town | Released | |
| 1 July 2018 | CM | (Republic of the Congo) | Amine Linganzi | Unattached | Released | |
| 1 July 2018 | AM | (Republic of Ireland) | Donal McDermott | Unattached | Released | |
| 1 July 2018 | CB | (Northern Ireland) | Ryan McGivern | (Northern Ireland) Linfield | Released | |
| 1 July 2018 | GK | (England) | Stuart Moore | Milton Keynes Dons | Released | |
| 1 July 2018 | CF | (England) | Paul Mullin | Tranmere Rovers | Undisclosed | |
| 1 July 2018 | CF | (England) | Luke Norris | Colchester United | Undisclosed | |
| 1 July 2018 | CM | (England) | Tommy Ouldridge | Hungerford Town | Released | |
| 1 July 2018 | CB | (England) | Matt Preston | Mansfield Town | Free transfer | |
| 1 July 2018 | RB | (England) | Ben Purkiss | Walsall | Released | |
| 1 July 2018 | RB | (England) | Ollie Rejek | Unattached | Released | |
| 1 July 2018 | CM | (England) | Tom Smith | Cheltenham Town | Released | |
| 1 July 2018 | RB | (England) | Louis Spalding | Cirencester Town | Released | |

=== Loans in ===
| Date from | Position | Nationality | Name | From | Date until | Ref. |
|---|---|---|---|---|---|---|
| 2 July 2018 | AM | (England) | Steven Alzate | Brighton & Hove Albion | 9 January 2019 | |
| 7 July 2018 | CF | (England) | Elijah Adebayo | Fulham | 9 January 2019 | |
| 2 August 2018 | CB | (England) | Sid Nelson | Millwall | 1 January 2019 | |
| 31 August 2018 | CB | (England) | Luke Woolfenden | Ipswich Town | 31 May 2019 | |
| 4 January 2019 | RB | (Republic of Ireland) | Canice Carroll | Brentford | 31 May 2019 | |
| 4 January 2019 | CF | (Scotland) | Ben House | Reading | 31 May 2019 | |
| 10 January 2019 | LB | (England) | Ali Koiki | Burnley | 31 May 2019 | |
| 31 January 2019 | LW | (England) | Kyle Bennett | Bristol Rovers | 31 May 2019 | |
| 31 January 2019 | CF | (Jamaica) | Theo Robinson | Southend United | 31 May 2019 | |

=== Loans out ===
| Date from | Position | Nationality | Name | To | Date until | Ref. |
|---|---|---|---|---|---|---|
| 9 August 2018 | GK | (England) | Will Henry | Chippenham Town | 6 September 2018 | |
| 10 October 2018 | AM | (England) | Jordan Edwards | Chippenham Town | 10 January 2019 | |
| 9 November 2018 | GK | (England) | Will Henry | Swindon Supermarine | 9 December 2018 | |
| 16 January 2019 | CB | (Scotland) | Chris Robertson | Havant & Waterlooville | February 2019 | |
| 31 January 2019 | CF | (England) | Sol Pryce | Dulwich Hamlet | 11 March 2019 | |
| 5 March 2019 | GK | (England) | Will Henry | Gloucester City | 31 May 2019 | |
| 7 March 2019 | RM | (England) | Jermaine McGlashan | (Wales) Wrexham | 31 May 2019 | |
| 12 March 2019 | CF | (England) | Sol Pryce | Bath City | April 2019 | |

== Competitions ==
=== Friendlies ===
Swindon Town have announced they will face Cirencester Town, Melksham Town, West Bromwich Albion, Chippenham Town, Portsmouth and Swindon Supermarine as part of their pre-season preparations.

| 4 July 2018 Friendly | Cirencester Town | 1–3 | Swindon Town | Cirencester |
| 19:45 BST | Bennett 86' | | Mullings 36'; Oldham 43'; Anderson 51' | Stadium: The Corinium Stadium; Referee: Ross Martin |

| 7 July 2018 Friendly | Melksham Town | 2–5 | Swindon Town | Melksham |
| 13:00 BST | Higdon 15' (pen.); Plummer 56' | Report | Sam 3'; Anderson 11'; Alzate 37' (pen.); McGlashan 62'; Twine 65' | Stadium: InfiLED Arena; Attendance: 613; Referee: Daniel Lamport |

| 14 July 2018 Friendly | Swindon Town | 1–3 | West Bromwich Albion | Swindon |
| 15:00 BST | Adebayo 43' | Report | Rodriguez 30'; Edwards 66'; Jameson 80' | Stadium: The Energy Check County Ground; Referee: Andy Woolmer |

| 17 July 2018 Friendly | Chippenham Town | 2–0 | Swindon Town | Chippenham |
| 19:45 BST | McCootie 7'; Evans (?) | Report | | Stadium: Hardenhuish Park |

| 18 July 2018 Friendly | Benfica | 5–0 | Swindon Town | Burton-upon-Trent |
| 11:30 BST | Cervi; Salvio; Grimaldo; Pizzi (pen.); Conti | Report | | Stadium: St George's Park; Attendance: Behind closed doors |

| 21 July 2018 Friendly | Swindon Town | 0–2 | Portsmouth | Swindon |
| 15:00 BST | | Report | Hawkins 58'; Lowe 72' | Stadium: The Energy Check County Ground |

| 27 July 2018 Friendly | Swindon Supermarine | 1–4 | Swindon Town | South Marston |
| 19:45 BST | Selman 25' | Report | Coop 52' (o.g.); Doughty 60'; Twine 75', 81' | Stadium: Webb's Wood Stadium |

=== Overview ===
| Competition | Record | | | | | | | |
| Competition | G | W | D | L | GF | GA | GD | Win % |
|---|---|---|---|---|---|---|---|---|
| League Two | 46 | 16 | 16 | 14 | 59 | 56 | +3 | 34.78 |
| FA Cup | 2 | 1 | 0 | 1 | 2 | 2 | +0 | 50.00 |
| EFL Cup | 1 | 0 | 0 | 1 | 0 | 1 | −1 | 0.00 |
| EFL Trophy | 3 | 2 | 0 | 1 | 4 | 4 | +0 | 66.67 |
| Total | 52 | 19 | 16 | 17 | 65 | 63 | +2 | 36.54 |

Updated to match played 27 October 2018
Source: Competitions

=== League Two ===
==== League table ====
| Pos | Team | Pld | W | D | L | GF | GA | GD | Pts |
|---|---|---|---|---|---|---|---|---|---|
| 11 | Carlisle United | 46 | 20 | 8 | 18 | 67 | 62 | +5 | 68 |
| 12 | Crewe Alexandra | 46 | 19 | 8 | 19 | 60 | 59 | +1 | 65 |
| 13 | Swindon Town | 46 | 16 | 16 | 14 | 59 | 56 | +3 | 64 |
| 14 | Oldham Athletic | 46 | 16 | 14 | 16 | 67 | 60 | +7 | 62 |
| 15 | Northampton Town | 46 | 14 | 19 | 13 | 64 | 63 | +1 | 61 |

Source: EFL Official Website
Rules for classification: 1) Points; 2) Goal difference; 3) Number of goals scored; 4) Head-to-head results

==== Results summary ====
| Overall | | | | | | | | Home | | | | | | Away | | | | | |
| Pld | W | D | L | GF | GA | GD | Pts | W | D | L | GF | GA | GD | W | D | L | GF | GA | GD |
|---|---|---|---|---|---|---|---|---|---|---|---|---|---|---|---|---|---|---|---|
| 46 | 16 | 16 | 14 | 59 | 56 | +3 | 64 | 8 | 9 | 6 | 31 | 27 | +4 | 8 | 7 | 8 | 28 | 29 | −1 |

Last updated: 4 May 2019.
Source: BBC

==== Results by matchday ====
| Matchday | 1 | 2 | 3 | 4 | 5 | 6 | 7 | 8 | 9 | 10 | 11 | 12 | 13 | 14 | 15 | 16 | 17 | 18 | 19 | 20 | 21 | 22 | 23 | 24 | 25 | 26 | 27 | 28 | 29 | 30 | 31 | 32 | 33 | 34 | 35 | 36 | 37 | 38 | 39 | 40 | 41 | 42 | 43 | 44 | 45 | 46 |
|---|---|---|---|---|---|---|---|---|---|---|---|---|---|---|---|---|---|---|---|---|---|---|---|---|---|---|---|---|---|---|---|---|---|---|---|---|---|---|---|---|---|---|---|---|---|---|
| Ground | H | A | H | A | A | H | A | H | A | H | A | H | A | H | H | A | A | H | A | H | H | A | H | A | A | H | A | H | A | H | A | H | H | H | A | A | H | H | A | H | A | A | A | H | A | H |
| Result | W | L | W | D | D | D | W | L | W | D | L | D | L | D | L | W | L | L | W | W | W | L | D | D | D | L | W | D | W | L | W | W | D | W | L | L | D | W | W | D | D | D | D | L | L | W |
| Position | 6 | 14 | 6 | 7 | 11 | 12 | 7 | 14 | 8 | 9 | 11 | 13 | 13 | 12 | 15 | 13 | 15 | 18 | 14 | 12 | 11 | 13 | 13 | 13 | 14 | 14 | 12 | 12 | 11 | 12 | 12 | 10 | 12 | 10 | 10 | 12 | 13 | 10 | 10 | 10 | 10 | 10 | 12 | 14 | 14 | 13 |

Updated to match(es) played on 4 May 2019. Source: 11v11
A = Away; H = Home; W = Win; D = Draw; L = Loss

==== Matches ====
On 21 June 2018, the League Two fixtures for the forthcoming season were announced.

| 4 August 2018 1 | Swindon Town | 3–2 | Macclesfield Town | Swindon |
| 15:00 BST | McGlashan (yellow card) 9'; Doughty 48', 90+6' (pen.), 90+8' (pen.); Lancashire (yellow card) 74'; McCourt (yellow card) 90'; Vigouroux (yellow card) 90+10' | Report | Arthur 46', 55'; Smith (yellow card) 90+1' | Stadium: County Ground; Attendance: 7,024; Referee: Robert Lewis |

| 11 August 2018 2 | Lincoln City | 4–1 | Swindon Town | Lincoln |
| 15:00 BST | Akinde 10' (pen.); Bostwick 29'; Toffolo 79'; Green 82' | Report | Doughty 44' (pen.), (yellow card) 80' | Stadium: Sincil Bank; Attendance: 8,405; Referee: Michael Salisbury |

| 18 August 2018 3 | Swindon Town | 3–2 | Tranmere Rovers | Swindon |
| 15:00 BST | Adebayo 20'; McGlashan (yellow card) 43'; Richards 60'; Romanski 73' | Report | Smith 10'; Norwood 13'; Harris (red card) 18'; Davies (yellow card) 43'; Banks (yellow card) 73' | Stadium: County Ground; Referee: Alan Young |

| 21 August 2018 4 | Crawley Town | 2–2 | Swindon Town | Crawley |
| 19:45 BST | Doherty (yellow card) 27'; Palmer 51', 90+9'; Payne (red card) 90+6' | Report | Dunne 13', (red card) 53'; Anderson 37'; Diagouraga (red card) 51'; Nelson (yellow card) 77'; Doughty (yellow card) 90' | Stadium: Broadfield Stadium; Attendance: 2,050; Referee: Charles Breakspear |

| 25 August 2018 5 | Forest Green Rovers | 1–1 | Swindon Town | Nailsworth |
| 15:00 BST | Doidge 5'; Digby (yellow card) 70'; James (yellow card) 90+7' | Report | Doughty 11' (pen.); Nelson (yellow card) 38'; Taylor (yellow card) 64'; Iandolo (yellow card) 82' | Stadium: The New Lawn; Attendance: 3,458; Referee: Andy Davies |

| 1 September 2018 6 | Swindon Town | 1–1 | Milton Keynes Dons | Swindon |
| 15:00 BST | Anderson (yellow card) 56'; Adebayo 90+4' | Report | Walsh 4'; Cargill (yellow card) 43' | Stadium: County Ground; Attendance: 6,620; Referee: Trevor Kettle |

| 8 September 2018 7 | Morecambe | 0–1 | Swindon Town | Morecambe |
| 15:00 BST | Old (yellow card) 78' | Report | Adebayo 26'; Knoyle (red card) 35'; McCourt (yellow card) 78' | Stadium: Globe Arena; Attendance: 1,559; Referee: Paul Marsden |

| 15 September 2018 8 | Swindon Town | 1–2 | Bury | Swindon |
| 15:00 BST | Dunne (yellow card) 13'; Woolfenden 50'; Diagouraga (yellow card) 72'; Adebayo (yellow card) 90+3' | Report | Moore 19', 56', (yellow card) 89'; Aimson (yellow card) 26'; McFadzean (yellow card) 54'; Mayor (yellow card) 63' | Stadium: County Ground; Attendance: 6,087; Referee: Kevin Johnson |

| 22 September 2018 9 | Yeovil Town | 0–3 | Swindon Town | Yeovil |
| 15:00 BST | Pattison (yellow card) 4'; Mugabi (yellow card) 18' | Report | Alzate 59'; Taylor 79'; Adebayo 89', (yellow card) 90' | Stadium: Huish Park; Attendance: 4,201; Referee: Matt Donohue |

| 29 September 2018 10 | Swindon Town | 0–0 | Oldham Athletic | Swindon |
| 15:00 BST | Alzate (yellow card) 38'; Woolfenden (yellow card) 83'; Taylor (red card) 90+5'; Nelson (yellow card) 90+6' | Report | Gardner (yellow card) 74'; Clarke (yellow card) 90+7' | Stadium: County Ground; Attendance: 6,181; Referee: Craig Hicks |

| 2 October 2018 11 | Crewe Alexandra | 1–0 | Swindon Town | Crewe |
| 19:45 BST | Kirk 30'; Jones (yellow card) 47'; Ainley (yellow card) 80' | Report | Nelson (yellow card) 12' | Stadium: Gresty Road; Attendance: 2,761; Referee: Ben Toner |

| 6 October 2018 12 | Swindon Town | 1–1 | Northampton Town | Swindon |
| 15:00 BST | Taylor 73'; Knoyle (yellow card) 85' | Report | O'Toole 60', (yellow card) 90+3'; Crooks (yellow card) 65'; Waters (yellow card) 86' | Stadium: County Ground; Attendance: 6,138; Referee: Neil Hair |

| 13 October 2018 13 | Exeter City | 2–0 | Swindon Town | Exeter |
| 15:00 BST | Forte 14'; Boateng (yellow card) 59'; Stockley 63' | Report | | Stadium: St James Park; Attendance: 4,506; Referee: Peter Wright |

| 20 October 2018 14 | Swindon Town | 0–0 | Mansfield Town | Swindon |
| 15:00 BST | Richards (yellow card) 18'; Diagouraga (yellow card) 25'; Nelson (yellow card) 61' | Report | Atkinson (yellow card) 31' (yellow-red card); Preston (yellow card) 56'; Sweeney (yellow card) 64'; Mellis (yellow card) 73'; Butcher (yellow card) 90+1' | Stadium: County Ground; Attendance: 6,208; Referee: Anthony Coggins |

| 23 October 2018 15 | Swindon Town | 0–2 | Cambridge United | Swindon |
| 19:45 BST | Conroy (yellow card) 52'; Adebayo (yellow card) 69' | Report | Lambe 11', (yellow card) 90+3'; Brown 12'; Deegan (yellow card) 56'; Carroll (yellow card) 89' | Stadium: County Ground; Attendance: 5,824; Referee: Matt Donohue |

| 27 October 2018 16 | Notts County | 1–2 | Swindon Town | Nottingham |
| 15:00 BST | Hemmings 40'; Hewitt (yellow card) 43'; Milsom (yellow card) 55'; Stead (yellow card) 65' | Report | McCourt (yellow card) 15'; Nelson (yellow card) 43'; Alzate 65'; Turley 80' (og.); Knoyle (yellow card) 90+1'; Adebayo (yellow card) 90+4' | Stadium: Meadow Lane; Attendance: 6,114; Referee: Ross Joyce |

| 3 November 2018 17 | Colchester United | 1–0 | Swindon Town | Colchester |
| 15:00 GMT | Prosser (yellow card) 31'; Szmodics 45+5'; Pell (yellow card) 68' | Report | Dunne (yellow card) 41'; McGlashan (yellow card) 88' | Stadium: Colchester Community Stadium; Attendance: 3,227; Referee: Dean Whitestone |

| 17 November 2018 18 | Swindon Town | 0–4 | Carlisle United | Swindon |
| 15:00 GMT | | Report | Nadesan 41'; Slater 46', 65'; Devitt 54' | Stadium: County Ground; Attendance: 6,722; Referee: Graham Salisbury |

| 24 November 2018 19 | Port Vale | 0–1 | Swindon Town | Burslem |
| 15:00 GMT | Hannant (yellow card) 90+6'; Vassell (yellow card) 90+10' | Report | Adebayo 11', (yellow card) 88'; Alzate (yellow card) 90+4' | Stadium: Vale Park; Attendance: 3,877; Referee: Peter Wright |

| 27 November 2018 20 | Swindon Town | 3–2 | Stevenage | Swindon |
| 19:45 GMT | Pryce 1', 45+2'; Twine 6'; Iandolo (yellow card) 86'; McGlashan (yellow card) 90+4' | Report | Cuthbert 14', (yellow card) 40'; Seddon (yellow card) 25'; Wilkinson (yellow card) 68'; Reid 78' | Stadium: County Ground; Referee: Charles Breakspear |

| 8 December 2018 21 | Swindon Town | 2–1 | Newport County | Swindon |
| 15:00 GMT | Doughty 1'; Iandolo (yellow card) 26'; Adebayo (yellow card) 50'; Woolery 82' | Report | Demetriou (yellow card) 8'; O'Brien (yellow card) 45+2'; Amond 47'; Semenyo (yellow card) 50' | Stadium: County Ground; Attendance: 6,204; Referee: Dean Whitestone |

| 15 December 2018 22 | Grimsby Town | 2–1 | Swindon Town | Cleethorpes |
| 15:00 GMT | Thomas 26' (pen.), 61' | Report | Taylor 28' | Stadium: Blundell Park; Attendance: 3,809; Referee: Scott Oldham |

| 22 December 2018 23 | Swindon Town | 0–0 | Cheltenham Town | Swindon |
| 15:00 GMT | Dunne (yellow card) 56'; Nelson (yellow card) 78' | Report | Clements (yellow card) 6'; Boyle (yellow card) 47'; Forster (yellow card) 57'; Atangana (yellow card) 90+4' | Stadium: County Ground; Attendance: 7,026; Referee: Lee Collins |

| 26 December 2018 24 | Northampton Town | 1–1 | Swindon Town | Northampton |
| 15:00 GMT | Williams 6' van Veen (yellow card) 32'; Turnbull (yellow card) 39'; Bowditch (yellow card) 43'; Powell (yellow card) 90+5' | Report | Taylor (yellow card) 44'; Conroy (yellow card) 45+1'; Anderson 63' | Stadium: Sixfields Stadium; Attendance: 5,759; Referee: Antony Coggins |

| 29 December 2018 25 | Mansfield Town | 0–0 | Swindon Town | Mansfield |
| 15:00 GMT | Preston (yellow card) 33'; Pearce (yellow card) 73'; Bishop (yellow card) 90+3' | Report | McCourt (yellow card) 22'; Doughty (yellow card) 54' | Stadium: Field Mill; Attendance: 5,311; Referee: Trevor Kettle |

| 1 January 2019 26 | Swindon Town | 0–2 | Exeter City | Swindon |
| 15:00 GMT | | Report | Forte 37' (pen.); Martin (yellow card) 57'; Collins 69'; Ogbene (yellow card) 89' | Stadium: County Ground; Attendance: 6,755; Referee: Nick Kinseley |

| 5 January 2019 27 | Macclesfield Town | 1–2 | Swindon Town | Macclesfield |
| 15:00 GMT | Marsh 14'; Kelleher (yellow card) 44' | Report | Carroll (yellow card) 25'; Woolfenden (yellow card) 31'; Richards 37'; McCourt (yellow card) 70' (goal) 90+2'; Anderson (yellow card) 84'; Woolery (yellow card) 85' | Stadium: Moss Rose; Attendance: 1,964; Referee: Scott Oldham |

| 12 January 2019 28 | Swindon Town | 2–2 | Lincoln City | Swindon |
| 15:00 GMT | Doughty 55' (pen.), 88'; Anderson (yellow card) 64' | Report | Shackell (yellow card) 23' (yellow-red card) 55' (goal) 39'; Andrade (red card) 34'; McCartan 45+2'; Frecklington (yellow card) 54' | Stadium: County Ground; Attendance: 6,543; Referee: Ben Toner |

| 19 January 2019 29 | Tranmere Rovers | 1–2 | Swindon Town | Birkenhead |
| 15:00 GMT | Norwood 52'; Monthé (yellow card) 88'; Buxton (yellow card) 90' | Report | Richards 20'; Doughty 36' | Stadium: Prenton Park; Attendance: 5,847; Referee: Ross Joyce |

| 26 January 2019 30 | Swindon Town | 0–1 | Crawley Town | Swindon |
| 15:00 GMT | Anderson (penalty missed) 90' | Report | Sesay (yellow card) 40'; Camará (yellow card) 42'; Morais 45+1'; McNerney (yellow card) 80' | Stadium: County Ground; Attendance: 6,026; Referee: Lee Swabey |

| 2 February 2019 P | Swindon Town | P–P | Forest Green Rovers | Swindon |
| 15:00 GMT | | Report | | Stadium: County Ground |
Note: Fixture was postponed due to the inclement weather across the south west.

| 9 February 2019 31 | Milton Keynes Dons | 2–3 | Swindon Town | Denbigh |
| 15:00 GMT | Aneke (yellow card) 37'; Hesketh 60'; Martin (yellow card) 72'; Agard 88' | Report | Doughty 34', 73' (pen.); Anderson 60'; Vigouroux (yellow card) 90+3' | Stadium: Stadium mk Attendance: 7,864; Referee: Chris Sarginson |

| 12 February 2019 32 | Swindon Town | 2–0 | Forest Green Rovers | Swindon |
| 19:45 GMT | Woolery 36'; Robinson 44'; Koiki (yellow card) 69'; Carroll (yellow card) 83' | Report | Brown (yellow card) 8'; Gunning (yellow card) 25'; Liddle (yellow card) 56' | Stadium: County Ground; Attendance: 6,261; Referee: David Coote |

| 23 February 2019 33 | Swindon Town | 1–1 | Grimsby Town | Swindon |
| 15:00 GMT | Robinson 74' | Report | Öhman (yellow card) 20' (yellow-red card) 66'; Thomas (yellow card) 50'; Hendrie 76'; Dennis (yellow card) 90+5' | Stadium: County Ground; Attendance: 6,434; Referee: Neil Hair |

| 2 March 2019 34 | Swindon Town | 3–0 | Colchester United | Swindon |
| 15:00 GMT | Carroll 39'; Woolfenden 41' (yellow card) 87'; Bennett 66' | Report | Prosser (yellow card) 50'; Kent (yellow card) 60'; Mandron (yellow card) 85' | Stadium: County Ground; Attendance: 6,082; Referee: Oliver Yates |

| 9 March 2019 35 | Carlisle United | 2–1 | Swindon Town | Carlisle |
| 15:00 GMT | Hope 13'; Liddle (yellow card) 38'; O'Hare 79' | Report | Bennett 39'; Carroll (yellow card) 60'; Anderson (yellow card) 90+1' | Stadium: Brunton Park; Attendance: 4,629; Referee: Ben Toner |

| 12 March 2019 36 | Stevenage | 2–0 | Swindon Town | Stevenage |
| 19:45 GMT | Revell 36'; Chair 90+5' | Report | Woolery (yellow card) 27'; Diagouraga (yellow card) 56' | Stadium: Broadhall Way; Attendance: 2,194; Referee: Craig Hicks |

| 16 March 2019 37 | Swindon Town | 0–0 | Port Vale | Swindon |
| 15:00 GMT | | Report | Clark (yellow card) 13'; Crookes (yellow card) 52'; Smith (yellow card) 58' | Stadium: County Ground; Attendance: 6,322; Referee: Darren Drysdale |

| 23 March 2019 38 | Swindon Town | 4–0 | Morecambe | Swindon |
| 15:00 GMT | Robinson 10'; Woolery 42'; Conroy 66'; Bennett (yellow card) 80' (goal) 81' | Report | Kenyon (yellow card) 36' | Stadium: County Ground; Attendance: 5,707; Referee: Nick Kinseley |

| 30 March 2019 39 | Bury | 1–3 | Swindon Town | Bury |
| 15:00 GMT | Maynard 28'; Mayor (red card) 74' | Report | Robinson (yellow card) 21' (goal) 88'; Woolery 25', 57'; Bennett (yellow card) 41'; Carroll (yellow card) 74' | Stadium: Gigg Lane; Attendance: 3,997; Referee: Scott Oldham |

| 6 April 2019 40 | Swindon Town | 1–1 | Yeovil Town | Swindon |
| 15:00 BST | Anderson 45' | Report | Duffus (yellow card) 20'; Gafaiti 90+1' | Stadium: County Ground; Attendance: 6,645; Referee: Thomas Bramall |

| 9 April 2019 41 | Newport County | 0–0 | Swindon Town | Newport |
| 19:45 BST | Sheehan (yellow card) 29'; Crofts (yellow card) 63'; Demetriou (yellow card) 72' | Report | Anderson (yellow card) 30'; Carroll (yellow card) 90+2' | Stadium: Rodney Parade; Attendance: 3,314; Referee: Kevin Johnson |

| 13 April 2019 42 | Oldham Athletic | 2–2 | Swindon Town | Oldham |
| 15:00 BST | Edmundson 7' (yellow card) 45+2'; Branger 70' | Report | Doughty (yellow card) 32' (goal) 45+2'; Bennett 60' | Stadium: Boundary Park; Attendance: 4,064; Referee: Martin Coy |

| 19 April 2019 43 | Cambridge United | 0–0 | Swindon Town | Cambridge |
| 15:00 BST | | Report | Dunne (yellow card) 78' | Stadium: Abbey Stadium; Attendance: 4,380; Referee: Brett Huxtable |

| 22 April 2019 44 | Swindon Town | 1–2 | Crewe Alexandra | Swindon |
| 15:00 BST | Dunne (yellow card) 34'; Doughty 63' (pen.); Woolfenden (yellow card) 90+5' | Report | Porter 3', 45+1' (yellow card) 66'; Green (yellow card) 58'; Wintle (yellow card) 62'; Kirk (yellow card) 68'; Lowery (yellow card) 89'; Hunt (yellow card) 90+6' | Stadium: County Ground; Attendance: 6,107; Referee: Lee Collins |

| 27 April 2019 45 | Cheltenham Town | 3–2 | Swindon Town | Cheltenham |
| 15:00 BST | Woolfenden 26' (o.g.); Waters 30'; Dawson 37'; Tozer (yellow card) 41'; Boyle (yellow card) 90+2'; Raglan (yellow card) 90+4' | Report | Robinson 84'; Richards 90'; Woolfenden (yellow card) 90+1' | Stadium: Whaddon Road; Attendance: 4,306; Referee: Tom Nield |

| 4 May 2019 46 | Swindon Town | 3–1 | Notts County | Swindon |
| 15:00 BST | Doughty (yellow card) 38'; Woolery 69'; Robinson 74', 90+2' | Report | Hemmings 52' (pen.) | Stadium: County Ground; Attendance: 8,676; Referee: Kevin Johnson |

=== FA Cup ===
The first round draw was made live on BBC by Dennis Wise and Dion Dublin on 22 October. The draw for the second round was made live on BBC and BT by Mark Schwarzer and Glenn Murray on 12 November.

| 10 November 2018 First round | Swindon Town | 2–1 | York City | Swindon |
| 15:00 GMT | Twine 12'; Alzate 76' | Report | Ferguson 43' | Stadium: County Ground; Attendance: 3,744; Referee: Carl Brook |

| 2 December 2018 Second round | Swindon Town | 0–1 | Woking | Swindon |
| 14:00 GMT | | Report | Jolley (yellow card) 30'; Hyde 56'; Edser (yellow card) 63'; Loza (yellow card) 67' | Stadium: County Ground; Attendance: 3,654; Referee: Matthew Donohue |

=== EFL Cup ===
On 15 June 2018, the draw for the first round was made in Vietnam.

| 14 August 2018 First round | Swindon Town | 0–1 | Forest Green Rovers | Swindon |
| 19:45 BST | | Report | Campbell 60' | Stadium: County Ground; Referee: David Webb |

=== EFL Trophy ===
==== Group stage ====
On 13 July 2018, the initial group stage draw bar the U21 invited clubs was announced.

| Pos | Lge | Team | Pld | W | PW | PL | L | GF | GA | GD | Pts | Qualification |
|---|---|---|---|---|---|---|---|---|---|---|---|---|
| 1 | ACA | Chelsea U21 | 3 | 2 | 0 | 0 | 1 | 9 | 3 | +6 | 6 | Round 2 |
| 2 | L2 | Newport County | 3 | 2 | 0 | 0 | 1 | 5 | 1 | +4 | 6 | Round 2 |
| 3 | L2 | Swindon Town | 3 | 2 | 0 | 0 | 1 | 4 | 4 | 0 | 6 | |
| 4 | L1 | Plymouth Argyle | 3 | 0 | 0 | 0 | 3 | 0 | 10 | −10 | 0 | |

Source: EFL.com

| 7 August 2018 Group stages | Swindon Town | 0–4 | Chelsea U23s | Swindon |
| 19:45 BST | Iandolo (yellow card) 45' | Report | Brown 16', 58'; Musonda 30' (pen.); Ugbo 89' | Stadium: County Ground; Attendance: 1,569; Referee: Brett Huxtable |

| 11 September 2018 Group stages | Swindon Town | 1–0 | Newport County | Swindon |
| 19:45 BST | Doughty 77' (pen.); Twine (yellow card) 90' | Report | O'Brien (yellow card) 66' | Stadium: County Ground; Attendance: 1,301; Referee: Anthony Coggins |

| 6 October 2018 Group stages | Plymouth Argyle | 0–3 | Swindon Town | Plymouth |
| 19:30 BST | | Report | Richards 16'; Anderson 38'; Woolery 82' | Stadium: Home Park; Attendance: 1,906; Referee: Brett Huxtable |

== Statistics ==
=== Appearances ===
| No. | Pos. | Name | League Two | | FA Cup | | EFL Cup | | EFL Trophy | | Total | | Discipline | |
| No. | Pos. | Name | Apps | Goals | Apps | Goals | Apps | Goals | Apps | Goals | Apps | Goals | Yellow card | Red card |
|---|---|---|---|---|---|---|---|---|---|---|---|---|---|---|
| 1 | GK | (Chile) Lawrence Vigouroux | 29 | 0 | 1 | 0 | 1 | 0 | 0 | 0 | 31 | 0 | 1 | 0 |
| 2 | DF | (England) Kyle Knoyle | 38 (4) | 0 | 1 (1) | 0 | 1 | 0 | 3 | 0 | 43 (5) | 0 | 2 | 1 |
| 3 | MF | (Wales) Michael Doughty | 26 (4) | 13 | 1 | 0 | 1 | 0 | 0 (1) | 1 | 20 (10) | 14 | 2 | 0 |
| 4 | MF | (England) Jak McCourt | 17 (10) | 1 | 1 | 0 | 0 | 0 | 2 | 0 | 20 (10) | 1 | 3 | 0 |
| 5 | DF | (England) Sid Nelson | 20 | 0 | 1 | 0 | 1 | 0 | 2 | 0 | 24 | 0 | 6 | 0 |
| 6 | DF | (England) Olly Lancashire | 15 (5) | 0 | 1 | 0 | 1 | 0 | 0 | 0 | 17 (5) | 0 | 1 | 0 |
| 7 | MF | (England) Jermaine McGlashan | 12 (12) | 0 | 1 | 0 | 0 (1) | 0 | 2 | 0 | 15 (13) | 0 | 4 | 0 |
| 8 | MF | (England) James Dunne | 20 (10) | 1 | 2 | 0 | 0 | 0 | 1 (1) | 0 | 23 (11) | 1 | 2 | 1 |
| 9 | FW | (England) Marc Richards | 16 (14) | 1 | 0 | 0 | 0 | 0 | 1 | 1 | 23 (11) | 5 | 1 | 0 |
| 10 | FW | (England) Keshi Anderson | 36 (7) | 4 | 1 (1) | 0 | 1 | 0 | 2 | 1 | 40 (8) | 5 | 1 | 0 |
| 11 | MF | (England) Steven Alzate | 15 (7) | 2 | 2 | 1 | 0 (1) | 0 | 0 (1) | 0 | 17 (9) | 3 | 2 | 0 |
| 14 | MF | (England) Ellis Iandolo | 8 (7) | 0 | 2 | 0 | 0 | 0 | 3 | 0 | 13 (7) | 0 | 4 | 0 |
| 15 | DF | (Scotland) Chris Robertson | 0 | 0 | 0 | 0 | 0 | 0 | 0 | 0 | 0 | 0 | 0 | 0 |
| 16 | MF | (England) Martin Smith | 8 (3) | 0 | 0 | 0 | 1 | 0 | 1 | 0 | 10 (3) | 0 | 0 | 0 |
| 17 | FW | (England) Elijah Adebayo | 20 (5) | 5 | 1 (1) | 0 | 1 | 0 | 2 | 0 | 24 (6) | 5 | 6 | 0 |
| 18 | FW | (Scotland) Ben House | 1 (5) | 0 | 0 (0) | 0 | 0 | 0 | 0 | 0 | 1 (5) | 0 | ? | ? |
| 19 | MF | (England) Canice Carroll | 15 (2) | 1 | 0 | 0 | 0 | 0 | 0 | 0 | 15 (2) | 1 | ? | ?0 |
| 20 | MF | (France) Toumani Diagouraga | 10 (2) | 0 | 0 | 0 | 1 | 0 | 2 | 0 | 13 (2) | 0 | 2 | 1 |
| 21 | MF | (Scotland) Jordan Young | 0 | 0 | 0 | 0 | 0 | 0 | 0 (1) | 0 | 0 (1) | 0 | 0 | 0 |
| 22 | FW | (England) Kaiyne Woolery | 25 (4) | 6 | 0 | 0 | 0 | 0 | 0 (1) | 1 | 25 (5) | 7 | 0 | 0 |
| 23 | GK | (England) Luke McCormick | 17 | 0 | 1 | 0 | 0 | 0 | 3 | 0 | 21 | 0 | 0 | 0 |
| 24 | FW | (England) Scott Twine | 7 (7) | 1 | 2 | 1 | 0 | 0 | 2 (1) | 0 | 11 (8) | 2 | 1 | 0 |
| 25 | DF | (England) Joe Romanski | 3 (1) | 1 | 0 | 0 | 1 | 0 | 3 | 0 | 7 (1) | 1 | 0 | 0 |
| 26 | DF | (England) Dion Conroy | 26 (1) | 1 | 1 | 0 | 0 | 0 | 2 | 0 | 29 (1) | 1 | 1 | 0 |
| 28 | FW | (England) Sol Pryce | 1 (1) | 2 | 1 | 0 | 0 | 0 | 0 (1) | 0 | 2 (2) | 2 | 0 | 0 |
| 29 | DF | (England) Ali Koiki | 13 (2) | 0 | 0 | 0 | 0 | 0 | 0 | 0 | 13 (2) | 0 | ? | ? |
| 31 | MF | (England) Matt Taylor | 29(4) | 3 | 0 (1) | 0 | 1 | 0 | 0 | 0 | 30 (5) | 3 | 1 | 1 |
| 32 | DF | (England) Luke Woolfenden | 32 | 2 | 2 | 0 | 0 | 0 | 2 | 0 | 36 | 2 | 1 | 0 |
| 33 | DF | (England) Tom Broadbent | 10 (2) | 0 | 0 | 0 | 0 | 0 | 0 | 0 | 10 (2) | 0 | ? | ? |
| 34 | DF | (England) Taylor Curran | 0 (1) | 0 | 0 | 0 | 0 | 0 | 0 | 0 | 0 (1) | 0 | ? | ? |
| 35 | FW | (Jamaica) Theo Robinson | 15 (1) | 7 | 0 | 0 | 0 | 0 | 0 | 0 | 15 (1) | 7 | ? | ? |
| 36 | DF | (Scotland) Cameron McGilp | 0 (1) | 0 | 0 | 0 | 0 | 0 | 0 | 0 | 0 (1) | 0 | ? | ? |
| 37 | MF | (England) Kyle Bennett | 14 (1) | 4 | 0 | 0 | 0 | 0 | 0 | 0 | 14 (1) | 4 | ? | ? |
| 38 | MF | (England) Jacob Bancroft | 0 (1) | 0 | 0 | 0 | 0 | 0 | 0 | 0 | 0 (1) | 0 | ? | ? |
Players who left the club in August/January transfer window or on loan
| 12 | GK | (England) Will Henry | 0 | 0 | 0 | 0 | 0 | 0 | 0 | 0 | 0 | 0 | 0 | 0 |
| 27 | MF | (England) Jordan Edwards | 0 | 0 | 0 | 0 | 0 | 0 | 0 | 0 | 0 | 0 | 0 | 0 |

Last updated: 15 December 2018.
Source: Swindon Town F.C.

=== Top scorers ===
The list is sorted by shirt number when total goals are equal.

| Rnk | Pos | No. | Player | League Two | FA Cup | EFL Cup | EFL Trophy | Total |
|---|---|---|---|---|---|---|---|---|
| 1 | MF | 3 | (Wales) Michael Doughty | 6 | 0 | 0 | 1 | 7 |
| 2 | FW | 17 | (England) Elijah Adebayo | 5 | 0 | 0 | 0 | 5 |
| 3 | MF | 11 | (England) Steven Alzate | 2 | 1 | 0 | 0 | 3 |
| 3 | MF | 31 | (England) Matt Taylor | 3 | 0 | 0 | 0 | 3 |
| 5 | FW | 9 | (England) Marc Richards | 1 | 0 | 0 | 1 | 2 |
| 5 | FW | 10 | (England) Keshi Anderson | 1 | 0 | 0 | 1 | 2 |
| 5 | FW | 22 | (England) Kaiyne Woolery | 1 | 0 | 0 | 1 | 2 |
| 5 | FW | 24 | (England) Scott Twine | 1 | 1 | 0 | 0 | 2 |
| 5 | FW | 28 | (England) Sol Pryce | 2 | 0 | 0 | 0 | 2 |
| 10 | MF | 8 | (England) James Dunne | 1 | 0 | 0 | 0 | 1 |
| 10 | DF | 25 | (England) Joe Romanski | 1 | 0 | 0 | 0 | 1 |
| 10 | DF | 32 | (England) Luke Woolfenden | 1 | 0 | 0 | 0 | 1 |
| Own goals | | | | 1 | 0 | 0 | 0 | 1 |
| Total | | | | 26 | 2 | 0 | 4 | 32 |

Last updated: 15 December 2018.
Source: Swindon Town F.C.

=== Clean sheets ===
The list is sorted by shirt number when total appearances are equal.

| Rnk | No. | Player | League Two | FA Cup | EFL Cup | EFL Trophy | Total |
|---|---|---|---|---|---|---|---|
| 1 | 23 | (England) Luke McCormick | 3 | 0 | 0 | 2 | 5 |
| 2 | 1 | (Chile) Lawrence Vigouroux | 2 | 0 | 0 | 0 | 2 |
| Total | | | 5 | 0 | 0 | 2 | 7 |

Last updated: 15 December 2018.
Source: Swindon Town F.C.

=== Summary ===
| Games played | 20 (16 League Two) (1 EFL Cup) (3 EFL Trophy) |
| Games won | 7 (5 League Two) (2 EFL Trophy) |
| Games drawn | 6 (6 League Two) |
| Games lost | 7 (5 League Two) (1 EFL Cup) (1 EFL Trophy) |
| Goals scored | 23 (19 League Two) (4 EFL Trophy) |
| Goals conceded | 26 (21 League Two) (1 EFL Cup) (4 EFL Trophy) |
| Goal difference | –3 (–2 League Two) (–1 EFL Cup) (+0 EFL Trophy) |
| Clean sheets | 6 (4 League Two) (2 EFL Trophy) |
| Yellow cards | 33 (31 League Two) (2 EFL Trophy) |
| Red cards | 4 (4 League Two) |
| Most appearances | 2 players (19 appearances) |
| Top scorer | (Wales) Michael Doughty (6 goals) |
| Winning Percentage | Overall: 7/20 (35.00%) |

Last updated: 27 October 2018.
Source: Swindon Town F.C.
