= Sol Pryce =

English footballer

Personal information
- Full name: Sol Easton Pryce
- Date of birth: 30 January 2000 (age 26)
- Place of birth: Chippenham, England
- Height: 1.83 m (6 ft 0 in)
- Position: Forward

Team information
- Current team: Highworth Town

Youth career
- 2014–2018: Swindon Town

Senior career*
Years	Team	Apps	(Gls)
2018–2019	Swindon Town	2	(2)
2019	→ Dulwich Hamlet (loan)	2	(0)
2019	→ Bath City (loan)	7	(1)
2019	Highworth Town	7	(0)
2019–2020	Melksham Town	8	(0)
2020	→ Calne Town (loan)	3	(1)
2020–2021	Chipping Sodbury Town	6	(1)
2021	Bitton	1	(0)
2022	Highworth Town	31	(13)
2023	→ Corsham Town (dual-reg.)	1	(0)
- * Club domestic league appearances and goals as of 12:06, 12 October 2023 (UTC)

Sol Easton Pryce (born 30 January 2000) is an English former professional footballer who played as a forward

== Club career ==
After joining local side Swindon Town at the age of fourteen, Pryce signed his first professional contract with Swindon Town in May 2018, after a successful 2017–18 season with the U18 squad. On 7 August 2018, Pryce made his Swindon debut replacing fellow academy graduate, Jordan Young during their 4–0 home defeat against Chelsea U23s in the EFL Trophy.

Pryce scored twice during his professional league debut in the 3-2 victory against Stevenage at the County Ground in November 2018.

On 31 January 2019, Pryce joined Dulwich Hamlet for the remainder of the 2018-19 season. Following, only two appearances for the club after a month, Pryce's loan was cut short and in turn, joined fellow National League South side, Bath City on a one-month loan.

He was released by Swindon at the end of the 2018–19 season.

Pryce had a spell at Highworth Town before joining Melksham Town in October 2019. Over the next few years, Pryce ventured lower into the English pyramid, having stints at Calne Town, Chipping Sodbury Town and Bitton before eventually returning to Highworth Town ahead of the 2022–23 campaign.

== Career statistics ==
As of match played 10 October 2023.

Appearances and goals by club, season and competition
Club	Season	League			FA Cup		League Cup		Other		Total	
Club	Season	Division	Apps	Goals	Apps	Goals	Apps	Goals	Apps	Goals	Apps	Goals
Swindon Town	2018–19	League Two	2	2	1	0	0	0	1 (Note: Appearance in the EFL Trophy)	0	4	2
Dulwich Hamlet (loan)	2018–19	National League South	2	0	—		—		—		2	0
Bath City (loan)	2018–19	National League South	7	1	—		—		1 (Note: Appearance in the National League South play-offs)	0	8	1
Highworth Town	2019–20	Southern League Division One South	7	0	2	1	—		2 (Note: Appearances in the Southern League Cup)	0	11	1
Melksham Town	2019–20	Southern League Division One South	8	0	—		—		2 (Note: Appearances in the FA Trophy)	0	10	0
Calne Town (loan)	2019–20	Western League Division One	3	1	—		—		—		3	1
Chipping Sodbury Town	2020–21	Western League Premier Division	6	1	1	0	—		1 (Note: Appearance in the FA Vase)	0	8	1
Bitton	2021–22	Western League Premier Division	1	0	0	0	—		0	0	1	0
Highworth Town	2022–23	Southern League Division One Central	23	11	1	0	—		0	0	24	11
Highworth Town	2023–24	Hellenic League Premier Division	8	2	3	1	—		1	0	12	3
Highworth Town	Total		31	13	4	1	—		1	0	36	14
Corsham Town (dual-reg.)	2023–24	Hellenic League Premier Division	1	0	—		—		0	0	1	0
Career total			68	18	8	2	0	0	8	0	84	20
