= Michael Doughty (footballer, born 1992) =

English footballer

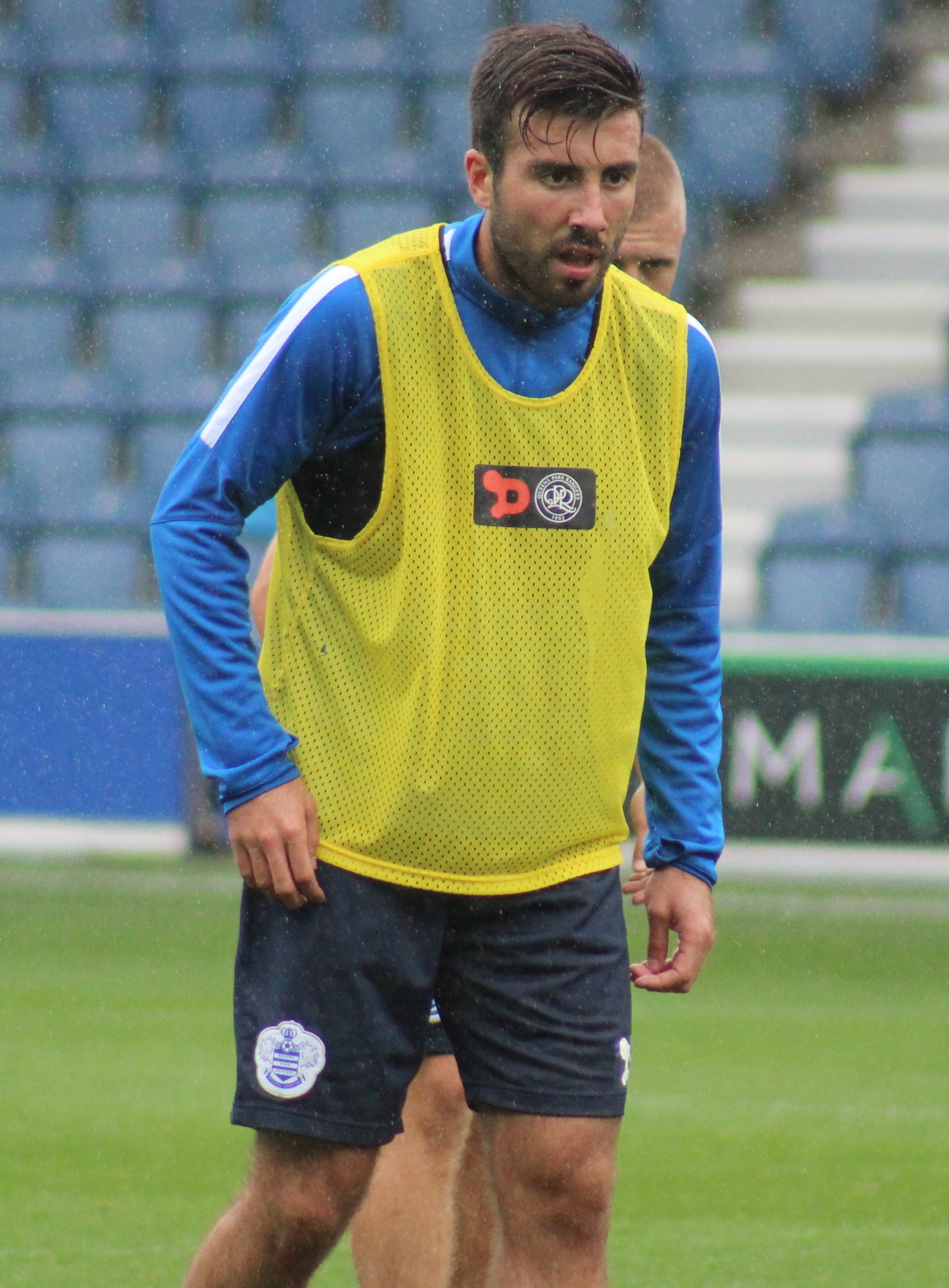
- Doughty warming up for Queens Park Rangers in 2016

Personal information
- Full name: Michael Edward Doughty
- Date of birth: 20 November 1992 (age 34)
- Place of birth: Westminster, England
- Height: 6 ft 1 in (1.85 m)
- Position: Midfielder

Youth career
- 2005–2010: Chelsea
- 2007–2010: Queens Park Rangers

Senior career*
Years	Team	Apps	(Gls)
2010–2017	Queens Park Rangers	12	(0)
2011	→ Woking (loan)	7	(0)
2011–2012	→ Crawley Town (loan)	16	(0)
2012	→ Aldershot Town (loan)	5	(0)
2013	→ St Johnstone (loan)	5	(0)
2013–2014	→ Stevenage (loan)	36	(2)
2014–2015	→ Gillingham (loan)	9	(0)
2016	→ Swindon Town (loan)	20	(5)
2016–2017	→ Swindon Town (loan)	14	(2)
2017–2018	Peterborough United	34	(1)
2018–2020	Swindon Town	61	(14)
Total		219	(24)

International career
2010	Wales U19	2	(0)
2012	Wales U21	1	(0)
- * Club domestic league appearances and goals

Michael Edward Doughty (born 20 November 1992) is a former professional footballer who played as a midfielder.

== Early life ==
Doughty was born Westminster, Greater London, the son of the late Nottingham Forest owner Nigel Doughty. He was educated at Harrow School, obtaining 14 A grades.

== Club career ==
=== QPR ===
Doughty joined the youth set-up at QPR as a schoolboy at the age of 14, after five years in the academy at Chelsea. He made his debut for QPR in the FA Cup defeat against Blackburn Rovers, after coming off the bench in the 88th minute. Doughty's Premier League debut for QPR came on 10 February 2015 at the age of 22, under caretaker managers Chris Ramsey and Kevin Bond, coming on as an 85th-minute substitute against Sunderland at Stadium of Light in what was QPR's first away victory (in fact their first away points) of the season.

==== Loan spells ====
In August 2011 he signed a six-month loan deal with Crawley Town.

On 5 March 2012, Doughty joined League Two side Aldershot Town on a one-month loan deal.

On 29 January 2013 Doughty joined Scottish Premier League side St Johnstone on loan.

Two weeks into the 2013–14 season, Doughty joined League One side Stevenage on loan until January 2014. He made his debut a day after signing, on 17 August, playing the whole game in a 1–0 home defeat to Leyton Orient. On 26 October 2013, Doughty scored a 90th-minute goal, his first goal in professional football, a left-footed angled shot from the left flank into the far corner, during Stevenage's home match against Crawley Town.

On 24 October 2014 Doughty joined League One side Gillingham on an initial one-month loan deal, which was later extended for a further two months. He was recalled by QPR on 9 January 2015.

In January 2016 Doughty joined League One side Swindon Town until the end of the 2015–16 season. Doughty rejoined the club following season on a season long loan.

=== Peterborough United ===
On 29 June 2017 Doughty signed for Peterborough United of League One on three-year contract.

=== Return to Swindon Town ===
On 23 July 2018, following a spell at Peterborough United, Doughty returned to Swindon Town on a two-year deal.

On 4 August 2018, Doughty started against Macclesfield Town on the opening day of the League Two season. Swindon won two penalties in the 96th and the 98th minute meaning Swindon won the game 3–2, with Doughty scoring a hat-trick as he scored both the penalties. Doughty finished August with five goals to his name and was nominated for the League Two player of the month award.

In July 2019 he signed a new contract with Swindon until 2022.

On 12 September 2020 Doughty left Swindon Town for personal reasons.

=== Retirement ===
Doughty retired from football at the end of the 2019–20 season.

== International career ==
He has been capped at under-19 level internationally for Wales, playing in a friendly against Liechtenstein.

In August 2012 Doughty was selected in the Wales Under-21 squad for the 2013 UEFA European Under-21 Football Championship qualification match against Czech Republic on 10 September 2012.

== Career statistics ==
As of match played 7 March 2020

Appearances and goals by club, season and competition
Club	Season	League			National Cup		League Cup		Other		Total	
Club	Season	Division	Apps	Goals	Apps	Goals	Apps	Goals	Apps	Goals	Apps	Goals
Queens Park Rangers	2010–11	Championship	0	0	1	0	0	0	0	0	1	0
Queens Park Rangers	2011–12	Premier League	0	0	0	0	0	0	0	0	0	0
Queens Park Rangers	2012–13	Premier League	0	0	0	0	0	0	0	0	0	0
Queens Park Rangers	2013–14	Championship	0	0	0	0	0	0	0	0	0	0
Queens Park Rangers	2014–15	Premier League	3	0	0	0	0	0	0	0	3	0
Queens Park Rangers	2015–16	Championship	5	0	1	0	2	0	0	0	8	0
Queens Park Rangers	2016–17	Championship	4	0	0	0	0	0	0	0	4	0
Queens Park Rangers	Total		12	0	2	0	2	0	0	0	16	0
Woking (loan)	2010–11	Conference South	7	0	0	0	0	0	0	0	7	0
Crawley Town (loan)	2011–12	League Two	16	1	2	1	0	0	0	0	18	2
Aldershot Town (loan)	2011–12	League Two	5	0	0	0	0	0	0	0	5	0
St Johnstone (loan)	2012–13	Scottish Premier League	5	0	1	0	0	0	0	0	6	0
Stevenage (loan)	2013–14	League One	36	2	3	0	1	0	3 (Note: Appearance(s) in Football League / EFL Trophy)	0	43	2
Gillingham (loan)	2014–15	League One	9	0	1	0	0	0	3	0	13	0
Swindon Town (loan)	2015–16	League One	20	5	0	0	0	0	0	0	20	5
Swindon Town (loan)	2016–17	League One	14	2	2	1	0	0	1	0	17	3
Swindon Town (loan)	Total		34	10	2	1	0	0	1	0	37	8
Peterborough United	2017–18	League One	34	1	3	1	1	0	4	0	42	2
Swindon Town	2018–19	League Two	30	13	1	0	1	0	1	1	33	14
Swindon Town	2019–20	League Two	31	1	2	0	1	0	2	0	36	1
Swindon Town	Total		61	14	3	0	2	0	3	1	69	15
Career total			219	24	17	3	6	0	14	1	256	28

== Honours ==
Swindon Town

- EFL League Two: 2019–20
