= 2021–22 Swindon Town F.C. season =

Swindon Town
2021–22 season
- Chairman: Clem Morfuni
- Manager: Ben Garner
- Stadium: The County Ground
- League Two: 6th
- FA Cup: Third round (eliminated by Manchester City)
- EFL Cup: First round (eliminated by Cambridge United)
- EFL Trophy: Last 32 (eliminated by Colchester United)
- Top goalscorer: League: Harry McKirdy (20); All: Harry McKirdy (23)
- Highest home attendance: 14,753 vs Manchester City) 7 January 2022
- Lowest home attendance: 1,728 vs Colchester United) 30 November 2021
Home colours	Away colours

The 2021–22 season is Swindon Town's 143rd year in their history and first season back in League Two since the 2019–20 season, following relegation from League One. The club will also compete in the FA Cup, EFL Trophy, and the EFL Cup. The season covers the period from 1 July 2021 to 30 June 2022.

== Managerial changes ==
On 26 May 2021, John McGreal was named as the new first team manager, signing a two-year contract. On 1 June 2021, McGreal named Rene Gilmartin as his assistant. However, on 25 June 2021, with increasing uncertainty regarding the ownership of the club, both McGreal and Gilmartin left by mutual consent. McGreal was in the job for just 30 days. Long-standing chief executive Steve Anderson also left the club on the same day. A few days later, director of football Paul Jewell stood down from his position. On 20 July 2021, Clem Morfuni was named the new owner and chairman of Swindon Town On 21 July 2021, Ben Garner was appointed head coach with Scott Lindsey and Scott Marshall appointed as assistant managers. Also Ben Chorley was appointed the club's new director of football. On 22 July 2021, Rob Angus was appointed new Chief Executive. On 13 August 2021, Zavier Austin was appointed vice chairman.

== Pre-season friendlies ==
Swindon Town announced friendlies against Melksham Town, Hungerford Town, Swansea City (later cancelled), Swindon Supermarine, Weymouth, Barnet (later cancelled), and Peterborough United as part of their pre-season preparations.

9 July 2021 Friendly	Melksham Town	0–0	Swindon Town	Melksham
19:45 BST	Mawford (yellow card) 38'	Report	Hunt (yellow card) 38'	Stadium: Oakfield Stadium; Attendance: 940

13 July 2021 Friendly	Hungerford Town	3–2	Swindon Town	Hungerford
19:30 BST	Seager 39'; Wollacott 41' (o.g.); Kyei 70'	Report	Tavares (Trialist) 31'; Boulden 53'	Stadium: Bulpit Lane; Attendance: 705

17 July 2021 Friendly	Swindon Town	C–C	Swansea City	Swindon
15:00 BST		Report		Stadium: The County Ground
Note: Match cancelled due to ongoing logistical and operational issues at Swindon Town.

20 July 2021 Friendly	Swindon Supermarine	2–3	Swindon Town	Swindon
19:30 BST	Spalding 76'; Pratt 89'	Report	Parsons 9'; McKirdy (Trialist) 24', 40'	Stadium: Hunts Cops

24 July 2021 Friendly	Weymouth	1–0	Swindon Town	Weymouth
15:00 BST	Ash 65'	Report		Stadium: Bob Lucas Stadium

27 July 2021 Friendly	Barnet	C–C	Swindon Town	Canons Park
19:45 BST		Report		Stadium: The Hive Stadium
Note: Match cancelled due to the number of positive cases for COVID-19 within the Swindon Town squad.

31 July 2021 Friendly	Swindon Town	0–1	Peterborough United	Swindon
15:00 BST		Report	(Trialist) 76'	Stadium: The County Ground; Attendance: 2431

== Competitions ==
=== League Two ===
==== League table ====
Pos	Team	Pld	W	D	L	GF	GA	GD	Pts	Promotion, qualification or relegation
3	Bristol Rovers (P)	46	23	11	12	71	49	+22	80	Promotion to EFL League One
4	Northampton Town	46	23	11	12	60	38	+22	80	Qualification for League Two play-offs
5	Port Vale (O, P)	46	22	12	12	67	46	+21	78	Qualification for League Two play-offs
6	Swindon Town	46	22	11	13	77	54	+23	77	Qualification for League Two play-offs
7	Mansfield Town	46	22	11	13	67	52	+15	77	Qualification for League Two play-offs
8	Sutton United	46	22	10	14	69	53	+16	76	
9	Tranmere Rovers	46	21	12	13	53	40	+13	75	

Source: EFL Official Website
Rules for classification: 1) Points; 2) Goal difference; 3) Number of goals scored; 4) Head-to-head results; 5) Wins; 6) Away goals; 7) Penalty points (sec 9.5); 8) 12-point sending off offences
(O) Play-off winners; (P) Promoted

==== Results summary ====
Overall								Home						Away					
Pld	W	D	L	GF	GA	GD	Pts	W	D	L	GF	GA	GD	W	D	L	GF	GA	GD
46	22	11	13	77	54	+23	77	9	7	7	35	25	+10	13	4	6	42	29	+13

Last updated: pre-season.

==== Results by matchday ====
Matchday	1	2	3	4	5	6	7	8	9	10	11	12	13	14	15	16	17	18	19	20	21	22	23	24	25	26	27	28	29	30	31	32	33	34	35	36	37	38	39	40	41	42	43	44	45	46
Ground	A	H	H	A	H	A	H	A	H	A	A	H	A	H	A	A	H	H	A	A	H	H	A	A	H	A	H	H	A	H	A	H	H	A	A	H	H	A	A	H	A	H	A	H	H	A
Result	W	L	D	W	W	D	L	D	D	W	W	D	W	L	W	W	W	D	L	L	D	W	L	W	D	D	D	L	L	W	W	W	L	W	L	W	W	L	D	L	W	L	W	W	W	W
Position	1	9	9	3	4	4	7	10	9	5	3	6	3	6	5	4	3	4	5	7	7	5	5	4	6	7	7	8	9	8	7	5	7	7	8	6	6	7	10	11	10	11	10	8	7	6

Updated to match(es) played on pre-season. Source: Statto.com
A = Away; H = Home; W = Win; D = Draw; L = Loss

==== Matches ====
Swindon Town's League Two fixtures were announced on 24 June 2021.

7 August 2021 1	Scunthorpe United	1–3	Swindon Town	Scunthorpe
15:00 BST	Loft 48' (pen.)	Report	Payne 57' (pen.); Conroy (yellow card) 59'; Gladwin 68'; Grant (yellow card) 78'; Mckirdy 88'; Simpson (yellow card) 90+1'	Stadium: Glanford Park; Attendance: 3,602 (850); Referee: Sam Purkiss

14 August 2021 2	Swindon Town	1–2	Carlisle United	Swindon
15:00 BST	Kesler Hayden (yellow card) 28' (yellow-red card) 90+7'; Crichlow 30'; Reed (yellow card) 90+3'	Report	Riley 13'; Dickenson (yellow card) 29'; Abrahams 43'; Norman (yellow card) 63'	Stadium: The County Ground; Attendance: 9,450 (253); Referee: Carl Brook

17 August 2021 3	Swindon Town	0–0	Tranmere Rovers	Swindon
19:45 BST	McKirdy (yellow card) 53'	Report	T.Davies (yellow card) 50'; Knight-Percival (yellow card) 87'; Murphy (yellow card) 90+5'	Stadium: The County Ground; Attendance: 8,274 (?); Referee: John Busby

21 August 2021 4	Salford City	0–1	Swindon Town	Salford
15:00 BST	Lund (yellow card) 90+5' Bowyer (manager) (yellow card)	Report	Iandolo (yellow card) 27'; Payne 49'; Grant (yellow card) 52'; Reed (yellow card) 80'; Williams (yellow card) 80' Garner (head coach) (yellow card)	Stadium: Moor Lane; Attendance: 2,229 (761); Referee: Tom Reeves

28 August 2021 5	Swindon Town	1–0	Mansfield Town	Swindon
15:00 BST	Simpson 59'; Kesler Hayden (yellow card) 75'; Odimayo (yellow card) 88'; McKirdy (yellow card) 90+3'	Report	O.Clarke (yellow card) 37'	Stadium: The County Ground; Attendance: 8,631 (?); Referee: Bobby Madley

4 September 2021 6	Stevenage	1–1	Swindon Town	Stevenage
15:00 BST	Coker 54'; Lines (yellow card) 90+6'	Report	Payne 90+5' (pen.)	Stadium: Broadhall Way; Attendance: 3,589 (1,005); Referee: John Brooks

11 September 2021 7	Swindon Town	1–2	Port Vale	Swindon
15:00 BST	Payne (yellow card) 13'; Simpson (yellow card) 45+4' (goal) 49'; Gilbert (yellow card) 55'; Parsons (yellow card) 82'	Report	Garrity 22' 81'; Conlon (yellow card) 27'	Stadium: The County Ground; Attendance: 8,734 (233); Referee: Neil Hair

18 September 2021 8	Northampton Town	1–1	Swindon Town	Northampton
14:00 BST	Rose (yellow card) 43'; Sowerby (yellow card) 44'; Hoskins (yellow card) 68'; Horsfall 83'; McWilliams (yellow card) 84'	Report	Conroy (yellow card) 52'; Simpson 57'	Stadium: Sixfields Stadium; Attendance: 5,863 (962); Referee: Brett Huxtable
Note: Earlier kick-off due to kick off clash with Northampton Saints

25 September 2021 9	Swindon Town	0–0	Colchester United	Swindon
15:00 BST	Conroy (yellow card) 9'	Report		Stadium: The County Ground; Attendance: 8,436 (?); Referee: Andrew Kitchen

2 October 2021 10	Bristol Rovers	1–3	Swindon Town	Bristol
15:00 BST	Anderson 17'; Kilgour (yellow card) 79' (yellow-red card) 84'; Harries (yellow card) 90+4'	Report	Payne 57'; Gladwin 85' (pen.); McKirdy 87'	Stadium: Memorial Stadium; Attendance: 7,625 (705); Referee: Robert Lewis

9 October 2021 11	Forest Green Rovers	0–2	Swindon Town	Nailsworth
12:00 BST	Sweeney (yellow card) 45+1'; Matt (yellow card) 45+2'; March (penalty missed) 90+4'	Report	McKirdy 54' (yellow card) 66'; Simpson 81'	Stadium: The New Lawn; Attendance: 3,442 (1,202); Referee: Paul Howard
Note: Earlier kick-off due to being selected for Sky Sports.

16 October 2021 12	Swindon Town	2–2	Rochdale	Swindon
15:00 BST	Gladwin 37'; Mitchell-Lawson (yellow card) 82'; Williams 90+3'	Report	O'Keeffe (yellow card) 13'; O'Connell (yellow card) 45+1'; Broadbent 57'; Kelly 79'	Stadium: The County Ground; Attendance: 9,310 (144); Referee: Simon Mather

19 October 2021 13	Sutton United	1–2	Swindon Town	Sutton
19:45 BST	John (yellow card) 24'; Beautyman 39' (pen.); Bugiel (yellow card) 60'; Barden (yellow card) 90+6'	Report	Reed 17' (yellow card) 70'; Williams 31'; McKirdy (yellow card) 87'; Crichlow (yellow card) 90'	Stadium: Gander Green Lane; Attendance: 3,443 (574); Referee: Chris Sarginson

23 October 2021 14	Swindon Town	1–3	Bradford City	Swindon
15:00 BST	Gladwin (yellow card) 20'; Baudry (yellow card) 25'; Hunt (yellow card) 50'; Payne 78' (pen.)	Report	Lavery 16' (yellow card) 67'; Sutton 40'; O'Donnell (yellow card) 66'; Robinson 75' (yellow card) 76'	Stadium: The County Ground; Attendance: 9,461 (425); Referee: Ross Joyce

30 October 2021 15	Oldham Athletic	1–3	Swindon Town	Oldham
15:00 BST	Bowden (yellow card) 26'; Piergianni 90'	Report	McKirdy 32' (yellow card) 71'; Iandolo (yellow card) 37'; Simpson 79' 90+4'	Stadium: Boundary Park; Attendance: 4,085 (635); Referee: Anthony Backhouse

13 November 2021	Swindon Town	P–P	Crawley Town	Swindon
15:00 GMT		Report		Stadium: The County Ground
Note: Postponed due to International Call-Ups.

20 November 2021 16	Newport County	1–2	Swindon Town	Newport
15:00 GMT	Demetriou (yellow card) 32'; Dolan (yellow card) 62'; Telford 74'	Report	Gladwin (yellow card) 69'; Azaz 73' (o.g.); Reed (yellow card) 82'; Payne 88'	Stadium: Rodney Parade; Attendance: 5,141 (1,027); Referee: James Bell

23 November 2021 17	Swindon Town	3–1	Hartlepool United	Swindon
19:45 GMT	Williams 52'; McKirdy (yellow card) 59'; Simpson 69'; Payne 90+4'	Report	Daly 61'	Stadium: The County Ground; Attendance: 7,714 (75); Referee: Lee Swabey

27 November 2021 18	Swindon Town	1–1	Harrogate Town	Swindon
15:00 GMT	Payne 83' (pen.); Odimayo (yellow card) 90+6'; Iandolo (yellow card) 90+6' Mildenhall (GK Coach) (yellow card)	Report	Diamond 24'; Falkingham (yellow card) 66'; Page (yellow card) 75'; Hall (yellow card) 90+7'	Stadium: The County Ground; Attendance: 8,199 (41); Referee: Alan Young

7 December 2021 19	Leyton Orient	4–1	Swindon Town	Leyton
19:45 GMT	Clay (yellow card) 12'; Drinan 16' 59'; Kemp (yellow card) 45+2'; Beckles (yellow card) 56'; Smith 64' 82'; Ogie (yellow card) 76'	Report	McKirdy 42' (yellow card) 64'; Reed (yellow card) 83'; Payne (yellow card) 83'	Stadium: Brisbane Road; Attendance: 4,020 (?); Referee: Darren Drysdale

11 December 2021 20	Barrow	2–0	Swindon Town	Barrow-in-Furness
15:00 GMT	Brown (yellow card) 38'; Banks 62' (pen.) (yellow card) 77'; Gotts (yellow card) 76'; Gordon 87' (pen.); Farman (yellow card) 84'; J.Jones (yellow card) 90+1'	Report	Gladwin (yellow card) 32'; McKirdy (yellow card) 76'; Mitchell-Lawson (yellow card) 87'; Conroy (red card) 90+6' Garner (head coach) (yellow card)	Stadium: Holker Street; Attendance: 2,863 (577); Referee: Ollie Yates

18 December 2021	Swindon Town	P–P	Walsall	Swindon
15:00 GMT		Report		Stadium: The County Ground
Note: The match was postponed on 16 December 2021 after several positive cases for COVID-19 within the Swindon Town squad

26 December 2021	Exeter City	P–P	Swindon Town	Exeter
15:00 GMT		Report		Stadium: St. James Park
Note: The match was postponed on 20 December 2021 after a number of positive cases for COVID-19 within the Exeter City squad

29 December 2021 21	Swindon Town	0–0	Stevenage	Swindon
19:45 GMT	Reed (yellow card) 40'; Iandolo (yellow card) 79'	Report	Reeves (yellow card) 75'	Stadium: The County Ground; Attendance: 8131 (112); Referee: John Busby

1 January 2022 22	Swindon Town	5–2	Northampton Town	Swindon
15:00 GMT	McKirdy 28', 51', 55', 66'; Hunt (yellow card) 49'; Simpson 60'; Kesler Hayden (yellow card) 88'	Report	McWilliams (yellow card) 18'; Sowerby (yellow card) 34'; Hoskins 37'; Guthrie 50'; Koiki (yellow card) 62'	Stadium: The County Ground; Attendance: 9,071 (746); Referee: Sam Allison

8 January 2022	Mansfield Town	P–P	Swindon Town	Mansfield
15:00 GMT		Report		Stadium: Field Mill
Note: The match was postponed on 21 December 2021 due to both teams competing in the 2021–22 FA Cup Third Round

11 January 2022 23	Mansfield Town	3–2	Swindon Town	Mansfield
19:30 GMT	Maris 4'; Hawkins (yellow card) 15'; McLaughlin 31' (pen.); Bowery 43'; O'Toole (yellow card) 63'	Report	McKirdy 28'; Odimayo (yellow card) 30'; Conroy (yellow card) 63'; Hunt (yellow card) 73'; Iandolo 89'	Stadium: Field Mill; Attendance: 4,129 (252); Referee: Tom Reeves

15 January 2022 24	Port Vale	1–3	Swindon Town	Burslem
15:00 GMT	Harratt 26'; Covolan (red card) 45+3'	Report	Williams 20'; Gladwin 45+5' (pen.); Smith 69' (o.g.); Lyden (yellow card) 81'	Stadium: Vale Park; Attendance: 6,064 (703); Referee: Andy Haines

22 January 2022 25	Swindon Town	1–1	Bristol Rovers	Swindon
13:00 GMT	Simpson 16'; Iandolo (yellow card) 57'	Report	Taylor (yellow card) 25'; Finley (yellow card) 32' (goal) 35'; Loft (yellow card) 40'; Coutts (yellow card) 74'; Grant (yellow card) 90+4'; Hoole (yellow card) 90+6'	Stadium: The County Ground; Attendance: 12,695 (2,473); Referee: Tom Nield
Note: Earlier kick off on police advice

29 January 2022 26	Colchester United	1–1	Swindon Town	Colchester
15:00 GMT	Tchamadeu (yellow card) 43'; Hannant (yellow card) 43'; George (red card) 72'; Chambers (red card) 87'; Huws 90+2'; Sears (yellow card) 90+5'	Report	Lyden (yellow card) 43'; McKirdy 68'; Wollacott (yellow card) 90'	Stadium: Colchester Community Stadium; Attendance: 3,327 (605); Referee: Chris Sarginson

1 February 2022 27	Swindon Town	1–1	Crawley Town	Swindon
19:45 GMT	Lyden (yellow card) 81'; McKirdy (yellow card) 83'; Mitchell-Lawson 90+2'; Reed (red card) 90+6'	Report	Powell 41' (pen.) (yellow card) 77'; Nichols (yellow card) 54'; Tsaroulla (yellow card) 65'	Stadium: The County Ground; Attendance: 7,306 (131); Referee: Carl Brook

5 February 2022 28	Swindon Town	1–2	Exeter City	Swindon
15:00 GMT	Tomlinson 58'	Report	J.Brown 84'; Dieng 88'	Stadium: The County Ground; Attendance: 10,642 (1,260); Referee: Darren Drysdale

8 February 2022 29	Tranmere Rovers	3–0	Swindon Town	Birkenhead
19:45 GMT	Davies (yellow card) 2'; Hemmings 6' 72' (pen.); Glatzel 58'	Report	Mitchell-Lawson (yellow card) 60'; Iandolo (yellow card) 85' Marshall (assistant coach) (red card)	Stadium: Prenton Park; Attendance: ? (?); Referee: Simon Mather

12 February 2022 30	Swindon Town	3–0	Scunthorpe United	Swindon
15:00 GMT	Gladwin (yellow card) 32'; McKirdy 58'; Davison 70' 85' (pen.)	Report	Millen (yellow card) 56'; Rowe (yellow card) 90+4'	Stadium: The County Ground; Attendance: 9,012 (131); Referee: Will Finnie

19 February 2022 31	Carlisle United	0–3	Swindon Town	Carlisle
15:00 GMT	Simeu (yellow card) 36'	Report	McKirdy 17'; Davison (yellow card) 36' (goal) 55'; Barry 57'; Cooper (yellow card) 87'	Stadium: Brunton Park; Attendance: 4,345 (381); Referee: Oliver Langford

22 February 2022 32	Swindon Town	5–0	Walsall	Swindon
19:45 GMT	Barry 36' 63'; Aguiar 45+2' 56'; Williams 71'	Report	Menayese (yellow card) 55'; Monthé (yellow card) 87'	Stadium: The County Ground; Attendance: 9840 (214); Referee: Christopher Pollard

26 February 2022 33	Swindon Town	1–2	Salford City	Swindon
15:00 GMT	McKirdy 55'	Report	Shephard 65'; Kelly (yellow card) 71'; Watson 86'	Stadium: The County Ground; Attendance: 10,153 (94); Referee: John Busby

5 March 2022 34	Bradford City	1–2	Swindon Town	Bradford
15:00 GMT	Evans 18'; O'Connor (yellow card) 40'	Report	McKirdy 21' (yellow card) 64'; Reed (yellow card) 57'; Iandolo (yellow card) 61'; Payne 90+6' (pen.)	Stadium: Valley Parade; Attendance: 15,008 (561); Referee: Paul Howard

8 March 2022 35	Exeter City	3–1	Swindon Town	Exeter
19:45 GMT	J.Brown 17'; Grounds 26'; Jay 81'	Report	Davison (yellow card) 25'; Iandolo (yellow card) 73'; Payne 90+3'	Stadium: St. James Park; Attendance: 5,958 (733); Referee: Robert Lewis

12 March 2022 36	Swindon Town	1–0	Oldham Athletic	Swindon
15:00 GMT	R.Hunt (yellow card) 45'; Aguiar (yellow card) 76'; Conroy 90+6'	Report	Hart (yellow card) 24'; Clarke (yellow card) 27' (yellow-red card) 90+1'; Adams (yellow card) 33'; Piergianni (yellow card) 42'; Fage (yellow card) 74'; Hope (yellow card) 83'; Stobbs (yellow card) 90+5'	Stadium: The County Ground; Attendance: 11,390 (280); Referee: David Rock

15 March 2022 37	Swindon Town	2–1	Sutton United	Swindon
19:45 GMT	Davison 14' (yellow card) 70'; Reed (yellow card) 35' (yellow-red card) 90+3'; McKirdy 49'; Iandolo (yellow card) 63'	Report	Kizzi 28'; Boldewijn (yellow card) 49'; Rowe (yellow card) 85'	Stadium: The County Ground; Attendance: 8243 (112); Referee: Carl Boyeson

19 March 2022 38	Crawley Town	3–1	Swindon Town	Crawley
15:00 GMT	Appiah 29'; Francillette (yellow card) 56'; Nichols 72'; Marshall (yellow card) 84'; Hutchinson 90+1'	Report	Davison 50'; Williams (yellow card) 56'; Odimayo (yellow card) 65'	Stadium: Broadfield Stadium; Attendance: 2977 (1041); Referee: Darren Handley

26 March 2022	Swindon Town	P–P	Forest Green Rovers	Swindon
15:00 GMT		Report		Stadium: The County Ground
Note: Postponed due to International Call-Ups

2 April 2022 39	Rochdale	0–0	Swindon Town	Rochdale
15:00 BST	Dorsett (yellow card) 12'	Report	Iandolo (yellow card) 55'	Stadium: Spotland; Attendance: 2,779 (695); Referee: Declan Bourne

9 April 2022 40	Swindon Town	0–1	Newport County	Swindon
15:00 BST		Report	Lewis (yellow card) 28'; Conroy 90' (o.g.); Azaz (yellow card) 90+1'	Stadium: The County Ground; Attendance: 11,408 (1202); Referee: Neil Hair

15 April 2022 41	Harrogate Town	1–4	Swindon Town	Harrogate
15:00 BST	Austerfield (yellow card) 90+1'; Armstrong 90+4'	Report	Barry 24' 30'; Davison 51' 63'	Stadium: Wetherby Road; Attendance: 2,933 (600); Referee: Scott Oldham

18 April 2022 42	Swindon Town	1–2	Leyton Orient	Swindon
15:00 BST	Barry (yellow card) 37'; O'Brien (yellow card) 38'; Davison 78'	Report	Kyprianou (yellow card) 18' (yellow-red card) 24'; Beckles 20' 54'; Pratley (yellow card) 37'; Ogie (yellow card) 37'; Archibald (yellow card) 38'; Brown (yellow card) 89'	Stadium: The County Ground; Attendance: 10,264 (351); Referee: Sam Allison

23 April 2022 43	Hartlepool United	0–3	Swindon Town	Hartlepool
15:00 BST	Ferguson (yellow card) 26'	Report	Iandolo (yellow card) 36'; McKirdy 40' 55'; Baudry 85'	Stadium: Victoria Park; Attendance: 4,786 (465); Referee: Andy Haines

26 April 2022 44	Swindon Town	2–1	Forest Green Rovers	Swindon
19:45 BST	Barry 15'; Iandolo (yellow card) 36' (yellow-red card) 53'; Payne 40' (yellow card) 90+2'; Williams (yellow card) 53'; McKirdy (yellow card) 85'	Report	Godwin-Malife (yellow card) 13'; Adams (yellow card) 59'; March (yellow card) 63' (goal) 69'; Young (yellow card) 82'	Stadium: The County Ground; Attendance: 11,150 (692); Referee: James Oldham

30 April 2022 45	Swindon Town	2–1	Barrow	Swindon
15:00 BST	Davison 22'; Odimayo (yellow card) 61'; Reed 85'	Report	Gotts (yellow card) 24'; Brough (yellow card) 73'; Platt 83'	Stadium: The County Ground; Attendance: 13,355 (223); Referee: Robert Lewis

7 May 2022 46	Walsall	0–3	Swindon Town	Walsall
15:00 BST	Daniels (yellow card) 45+2'; Monthé (yellow card) 73'	Report	McKirdy 3'; Payne 25' 45+3' (pen.); Reed (yellow card) 70'	Stadium: Bescot Stadium; Attendance: 9,089 (3,590); Referee: Sam Barrott
Note: Swindon qualify for League Two Play-Offs.

==== Play-offs ====
Town League Two play-offs semi-finals against Port Vale both legs showed live on Sky Sports.

15 May 2022 First Leg	Swindon Town	2–1	Port Vale	Swindon
12:00 BST	McKirdy 26', 68'; Davison (yellow card) 32'; Reed (yellow card) 77'	Report	Charlsey (yellow card) 42'; Wilson 83'	Stadium: The County Ground; Attendance: 14,086 (1,659); Referee: Ross Joyce
Note: Live on Sky Sports

19 May 2022 Second Leg	Port Vale	1–0 (a.e.t.) (2–2 agg.) (6–5 p)	Swindon Town	Burslem
19:45 BST	Wilson 8', (yellow card) 42'; Pett (yellow card) 59'	Report	Iandolo (yellow card) 56'; Conroy (yellow card) 95'; McKirdy (yellow card) 120+1'	Stadium: Vale Park; Attendance: 11,669; Referee: Seb Stockbridge
	Penalties
	Wilson (penalty scored); Worrall (penalty missed); Edmondson (penalty missed); Charsley (penalty scored); Pett (penalty scored); Garrity (penalty scored); Gibbons (penalty scored); Benning (penalty scored)		Payne (penalty scored); Gladwin (penalty scored); McKirdy (penalty missed); Reed (penalty scored); Davison (penalty missed); Conroy (penalty scored); Egbo (penalty scored); Iandolo (penalty missed)
Note: Live on Sky Sports

=== FA Cup ===
Town were drawn away to Crewe Alexandra in the first round. Town were drawn away to Walsall in the Second round. Town were drawn Home to Manchester City in the Third round.

6 November 2021 First round	Crewe Alexandra	0–3	Swindon Town	Crewe
15:00 GMT	Robertson (yellow card) 79'	Report	Reed 25' (yellow card) 75' (goal) 79'; Williams (yellow card) 38'; Simpson 52'	Stadium: Gresty Road; Attendance: 2,303 (?); Referee: Trevor Kettle

4 December 2021 Second round	Walsall	1–2	Swindon Town	Walsall
15:00 GMT	Osadebe 37'; White (yellow card) 42'; Monthé (yellow card) 56'; Khan (yellow card) 89'	Report	Simpson 16'; McKirdy (yellow card) 48'; Reed (yellow card) 50'; Kesler Hayden 67'	Stadium: Bescot Stadium; Attendance: 4,331 (2,024); Referee: Peter Wright

7 January 2022 Third round	Swindon Town	1–4	Manchester City	Swindon
20:00 GMT	McKirdy 78'	Report	Silva 14'; Jesus 27' (penalty missed) 61'; Gündoğan 59'; Rodri (yellow card) 65'; Walker (yellow card) 79'; Palmer 82'; McAtee (yellow card) 90+2'	Stadium: The County Ground; Attendance: 14,753 (2,318); Referee: Darren England
Note: Game moved to Friday due to being selected for ITV.

=== EFL Cup ===
Town were drawn away to Cambridge United in the first round.

10 August 2021 First round	Cambridge United	0–0 (3–1 p)	Swindon Town	Cambridge
19:45 BST	Iredale (yellow card) 38'; Weir (yellow card) 71'; May (yellow card) 74'	Report		Stadium: Abbey Stadium; Attendance: 1,825 (?); Referee: Trevor Kettle
	Penalties
	Ironside (penalty scored); Smith (penalty scored); Williams (penalty scored)		Payne (penalty missed); McKirdy (penalty missed); Reed (penalty scored); Hunt (penalty missed)

=== EFL Trophy ===
Swindon were drawn into Southern Group F alongside Newport County, Plymouth Argyle and Arsenal U21 Swindon were drawn against Colchester United in the last 32.

Pos	Div	Team	Pld	W	PW	PL	L	GF	GA	GD	Pts	Qualification
1	L2	Swindon Town	3	3	0	0	0	6	2	+4	9	Advance to Round 2
2	ACA	Arsenal U21	3	1	0	1	1	6	6	0	4	Advance to Round 2
3	L2	Newport County	3	1	0	0	2	5	5	0	3	
4	L1	Plymouth Argyle	3	0	1	0	2	2	6	−4	2	

Source: EFL.com

Win Draw Loss

7 September 2021 Group stage	Swindon Town	2–1	Arsenal U21	Swindon
19:00 BST	Dabre 17'; Taylor-Hart 69' (o.g.); Hunt (yellow card) 75'	Report	Ideho 34'	Stadium: The County Ground; Attendance: 2,452 (?); Referee: Lee Swabey

12 October 2021 Group stage	Plymouth Argyle	1–3	Swindon Town	Plymouth
19:00 BST	Agard 24'; Tomlinson (yellow card) 90+2'	Report	Gillesphey 20' (o.g.); Baudry (yellow card) 29'; Mitchell-Lawson 74'; McKirdy 84'	Stadium: Home Park; Attendance: 1,556 (116); Referee: Sam Allison

9 November 2021 Group stage	Swindon Town	1–0	Newport County	Swindon
19:00 GMT	Minturn (yellow card) 19'; Lyden 57'	Report	Missilou (yellow card) 21'; Hylton (yellow card) 53'; Upson (yellow card) 90+3'	Stadium: The County Ground; Attendance: 2,068 (57); Referee: James Oldham

30 November 2021 Last 32	Swindon Town	1–2	Colchester United	Swindon
19:45 GMT	Crichlow 45+1'; Francis (yellow card) 45+2'; Dabre (yellow card) 82' Garner (head coach) (yellow card)	Report	Chambers 6' 11'; Judge (yellow card) 14'; Smith (yellow card) 40'; Jasper (yellow card) 55'; McCoulsky (yellow card) 90+1'	Stadium: The County Ground; Attendance: 1,728 (58); Referee: Ben Toner

== Statistics ==
Players with names in italics and marked * were on loan from another club for the whole of their season with Swindon Town.

As of match played 15 May 2022

No.	Pos	Nat	Player	Total		League Two		FA Cup		EFL Cup		EFL Trophy	
No.	Pos	Nat	Player	Apps	Goals	Apps	Goals	Apps	Goals	Apps	Goals	Apps	Goals
1	GK	(Ghana) GHA	Jojo Wollacott	39	0	37+0	0	2+0	0	0+0	0	0+0	0
2	DF	(England) ENG	Akin Odimayo	42	0	30+6	0	3+0	0	1+0	0	2+0	0
3	MF	(England) ENG	Ellis Iandolo	51	1	40+5	1	3+0	0	1+0	0	1+1	0
4	DF	(England) ENG	Dion Conroy	40	1	36+0	1	3+0	0	0+0	0	0+1	0
6	DF	(France) FRA	Mathieu Baudry	19	1	14+2	1	1+0	0	1+0	0	1+0	0
7	MF	(England) ENG	Ben Gladwin	40	4	23+14	4	1+2	0	0+0	0	0+0	0
8	MF	(Australia) AUS	Jordan Lyden	14	1	5+5	0	1+0	0	0+0	0	3+0	1
9	FW	(England) ENG	Josh Davison*	22	9	22+0	9	0+0	0	0+0	0	0+0	0
10	MF	(England) ENG	Jack Payne	40	13	32+4	13	2+0	0	1+0	0	0+1	0
11	MF	(England) ENG	Harry McKirdy	43	23	33+3	21	3+0	1	1+0	0	2+1	1
12	GK	(England) ENG	Lewis Ward	16	0	10+0	0	1+0	0	1+0	0	4+0	0
13	GK	(England) ENG	Steve Mildenhall	0	0	0+0	0	0+0	0	0+0	0	0+0	0
14	DF	(Wales) WAL	Brandon Cooper*	8	0	8+0	0	0+0	0	0+0	0	0+0	0
15	GK	(England) ENG	Emmanuel Idem	0	0	0+0	0	0+0	0	0+0	0	0+0	0
16	DF	(Republic of Ireland) IRL	Jake O'Brien*	20	0	16+4	0	0+0	0	0+0	0	0+0	0
17	MF	(England) ENG	Jayden Mitchell-Lawson	30	2	2+22	1	0+2	0	0+0	0	4+0	1
18	DF	(England) ENG	Mandela Egbo	11	0	7+4	0	0+0	0	0+0	0	0+0	0
19	FW	(England) ENG	Louie Barry*	15	6	13+2	6	0+0	0	0+0	0	0+0	0
20	MF	(Wales) WAL	Jonny Williams	44	5	25+16	5	2+1	0	0+0	0	0+0	0
23	DF	(England) ENG	Joe Tomlinson*	10	1	10+0	1	0+0	0	0+0	0	0+0	0
24	DF	(England) ENG	Rob Hunt	44	0	35+2	0	2+1	0	0+1	0	3+0	0
25	MF	(England) ENG	Louis Reed	44	4	40+0	2	3+0	2	1+0	0	0+0	0
26	MF	(England) ENG	Ryan East	23	0	5+11	0	0+2	0	1+0	0	4+0	0
28	MF	(England) ENG	Ricky Aguiar	19	2	8+8	2	0+0	0	0+1	0	2+0	0
29	FW	(England) ENG	Harry Parsons	20	0	1+14	0	0+1	0	1+0	0	3+0	0
30	MF	(Italy) ITA	Mo Dabre	5	1	0+0	0	0+1	0	0+0	0	4+0	1
31	MF	(England) ENG	Donell Gordon	1	0	0+0	0	0+0	0	0+0	0	0+1	0
32	MF	(Wales) WAL	George Cowmeadow	1	0	0+0	0	0+0	0	0+0	0	0+1	0
33	MF	(England) ENG	Levi Francis	1	0	0+0	0	0+0	0	0+0	0	1+0	0
34	DF	(England) ENG	Harrison Minturn	2	0	0+0	0	0+0	0	0+0	0	2+0	0
35	DF	(England) ENG	Callum Winchcombe	1	0	0+0	0	0+0	0	0+0	0	1+0	0
36	MF	(England) ENG	Anton Dworzak	1	0	0+0	0	0+0	0	0+0	0	0+1	0
37	DF	(England) ENG	Harvey Fox	1	0	0+0	0	0+0	0	0+0	0	0+1	0
38	FW	(England) ENG	Tom Wynn-Davis	0	0	0+0	0	0+0	0	0+0	0	0+0	0
39	FW	(England) ENG	Jed Afenyo	0	0	0+0	0	0+0	0	0+0	0	0+0	0
40	DF	(England) ENG	Jacob Bunch	0	0	0+0	0	0+0	0	0+0	0	0+0	0
Players who left the club:
5	DF	(England) ENG	Romoney Crichlow*	24	2	15+3	1	0+2	0	1+0	0	3+0	1
9	FW	(England) ENG	Tyreece Simpson*	30	11	24+1	9	3+0	2	1+0	0	0+1	0
19	FW	(Republic of Ireland) IRL	Alex Gilbert*	12	0	5+3	0	0+1	0	0+0	0	3+0	0
22	DF	(England) ENG	Kaine Kesler Hayden*	21	1	16+2	0	3+0	1	0+0	0	0+0	0
42	MF	(Jamaica) JAM	Anthony Grant	7	0	5+0	0	0+0	0	0+1	0	1+0	0

=== Goals record ===
As of match played 15 May 2022

Rank	No.	Nat.	Po.	Name	League One	FA Cup	League Cup	League Trophy	Total
1	11	(England)	MF	Harry McKirdy	21	1	0	1	23
2	10	(England)	MF	Jack Payne	13	0	0	0	13
3	9	(England)	FW	Tyreece Simpson	9	2	0	0	11
4	9	(England)	FW	Josh Davison	9	0	0	0	9
5	19	(England)	FW	Louie Barry	6	0	0	0	6
6	20	(Wales)	MF	Jonny Williams	5	0	0	0	5
7	7	(England)	MF	Ben Gladwin	4	0	0	0	4
7	25	(England)	MF	Louis Reed	2	2	0	0	4
8	5	(England)	DF	Romoney Crichlow	1	0	0	1	2
8	17	(England)	MF	Jayden Mitchell-Lawson	1	0	0	1	2
8	28	(England)	MF	Ricky Aguiar	2	0	0	0	2
9	3	(England)	MF	Ellis Iandolo	1	0	0	0	1
9	4	(England)	DF	Dion Conroy	1	0	0	0	1
9	6	(France)	DF	Mathieu Baudry	1	0	0	0	1
9	8	(Australia)	MF	Jordan Lyden	0	0	0	1	1
9	22	(England)	DF	Kaine Kesler Hayden	0	1	0	0	1
9	23	(England)	DF	Joe Tomlinson	1	0	0	0	1
9	30	(Italy)	MF	Mo Dabre	0	0	0	1	1
Own Goals					2	0	0	2	4
Total					77	6	0	7	90

=== Disciplinary record ===
As of match played 15 May 2022

Rank	No.	Nat.	Po.	Name	League Two			FA Cup			League Cup			League Trophy			Total		
Rank	No.	Nat.	Po.	Name	Booked	(yellow card) (yellow-red card)	Sent off (straight red)	Booked	(yellow card) (yellow-red card)	Sent off (straight red)	Booked	(yellow card) (yellow-red card)	Sent off (straight red)	Booked	(yellow card) (yellow-red card)	Sent off (straight red)	Booked	(yellow card) (yellow-red card)	Sent off (straight red)
1	11	(England)	MF	Harry McKirdy	11	0	0	1	0	0	0	0	0	0	0	0	12	0	0
2	3	(England)	MF	Ellis Iandolo	11	1	0	0	0	0	0	0	0	0	0	0	11	1	0
2	25	(England)	MF	Louis Reed	9	1	1	2	0	0	0	0	0	0	0	0	11	1	1
3	2	(England)	DF	Akin Odimayo	4	0	0	0	0	0	0	0	0	0	0	0	5	0	0
3	24	(England)	DF	Rob Hunt	4	0	0	0	0	0	0	0	0	1	0	0	5	0	0
4	4	(England)	DF	Dion Conroy	4	0	1	0	0	0	0	0	0	0	0	0	4	0	1
4	7	(England)	MF	Ben Gladwin	4	0	0	0	0	0	0	0	0	0	0	0	4	0	0
4	9	(England)	FW	Josh Davison	4	0	0	0	0	0	0	0	0	0	0	0	4	0	0
4	20	(Wales)	MF	Jonny Williams	3	0	0	1	0	0	0	0	0	0	0	0	4	0	0
5	8	(Australia)	MF	Jordan Lyden	3	0	0	0	0	0	0	0	0	0	0	0	3	0	0
5	10	(England)	MF	Jack Payne	3	0	0	0	0	0	0	0	0	0	0	0	3	0	0
5	17	(England)	MF	Jayden Mitchell-Lawson	3	0	0	0	0	0	0	0	0	0	0	0	3	0	0
6	6	(France)	DF	Mathieu Baudry	1	0	0	0	0	0	0	0	0	1	0	0	2	0	0
6	9	(England)	FW	Tyreece Simpson	2	0	0	0	0	0	0	0	0	0	0	0	2	0	0
6	22	(England)	DF	Kaine Kesler Hayden	2	1	0	0	0	0	0	0	0	0	0	0	2	1	0
6	42	(Jamaica)	MF	Anthony Grant	2	0	0	0	0	0	0	0	0	0	0	0	2	0	0
7	1	(England)	GK	Jojo Wollacott	1	0	0	0	0	0	0	0	0	0	0	0	1	0	0
7	5	(England)	DF	Romoney Crichlow	1	0	0	0	0	0	0	0	0	0	0	0	1	0	0
7	14	(Wales)	DF	Brandon Cooper	1	0	0	0	0	0	0	0	0	0	0	0	1	0	0
7	16	(Republic of Ireland)	DF	Jake O'Brien	1	0	0	0	0	0	0	0	0	0	0	0	1	0	0
7	19	(England)	FW	Louie Barry	1	0	0	0	0	0	0	0	0	0	0	0	1	0	0
7	19	(Republic of Ireland)	FW	Alex Gilbert	1	0	0	0	0	0	0	0	0	0	0	0	1	0	0
7	28	(England)	MF	Ricky Aguiar	1	0	0	0	0	0	0	0	0	0	0	0	1	0	0
7	29	(England)	FW	Harry Parsons	1	0	0	0	0	0	0	0	0	0	0	0	1	0	0
7	30	(Italy)	MF	Mo Dabre	0	0	0	0	0	0	0	0	0	1	0	0	1	0	0
7	33	(England)	MF	Levi Francis	0	0	0	0	0	0	0	0	0	1	0	0	1	0	0
7	34	(England)	DF	Harrison Minturn	0	0	0	0	0	0	0	0	0	1	0	0	1	0	0
Total					79	3	2	4	0	0	0	0	0	5	0	0	88	3	2

=== Management disciplinary record ===
As of match played 8 February 2022

Rank	No.	Nat.	Role.	Name	League Two			FA Cup			League Cup			League Trophy			Total		
Rank	No.	Nat.	Role.	Name	Booked	(yellow card) (yellow-red card)	Sent off (straight red)	Booked	(yellow card) (yellow-red card)	Sent off (straight red)	Booked	(yellow card) (yellow-red card)	Sent off (straight red)	Booked	(yellow card) (yellow-red card)	Sent off (straight red)	Booked	(yellow card) (yellow-red card)	Sent off (straight red)
1	N/A	(England)	Head coach	Ben Garner	2	0	0	0	0	0	0	0	0	1	0	0	3	0	0
2	N/A	(England)	GK Coach	Steve Mildenhall	1	0	0	0	0	0	0	0	0	0	0	0	1	0	0
2	N/A	(Scotland)	Assistant coach	Scott Marshall	0	0	1	0	0	0	0	0	0	0	0	0	0	0	1
Total					3	0	1	0	0	0	0	0	0	1	0	0	4	0	1

=== Suspension ===
As of match played 30 April 2022

No.	Name	Card	Team Against	Suspension	Missed Games
22	(England) Kaine Kesler Hayden	(yellow card) (yellow-red card)	Carlisle United	1	Tranmere Rovers
11	(England) Harry McKirdy	Booked	Oldham Athletic	1	Newport County
25	(England) Louis Reed	Booked	Leyton Orient	1	Barrow
4	(England) Dion Conroy	Sent off (straight red)	Barrow	2	Stevenage, Northampton Town
25	(England) Louis Reed	Sent off (straight red)	Crawley Town	2	Exeter City, Tranmere Rovers
11	(England) Harry McKirdy	Booked	Bradford City	2	Exeter City, Oldham Athletic
25	(England) Louis Reed	(yellow card) (yellow-red card)	Sutton United	2	Crawley Town, Rochdale
3	(England) Ellis Iandolo	(yellow card) (yellow-red card)	Forest Green Rovers	1	Barrow

=== Clean sheets ===
As of match played 7 May 2022

Rnk	No.	Name	League Two	FA Cup	League Cup	League Trophy	Total
1	1	(Ghana) Joe Wollacott	10	1	0	0	11
2	12	(England) Lewis Ward	3	0	1	1	5
3	13	(England) Steve Mildenhall	0	0	0	0	0
3	15	(England) Emmanuel Idem	0	0	0	0	0
TOTALS			13	1	1	1	16

=== Summary ===
As of match played 15 May 2022

Competition	P	W	D	L	GF	GA	CS	Booked	(yellow card) (yellow-red card)	Sent off (straight red)
League Two	47	23	11	13	79	55	13	78	3	2
FA Cup	3	2	0	1	6	5	1	4	0	0
EFL Cup	1	0	1	0	0	0	1	0	0	0
EFL Trophy	4	3	0	1	7	4	1	5	0	0
Total	55	28	12	15	92	64	16	87	3	2

== Awards ==
=== Players ===
No.	Pos.	Player	Award	Source
1	GK	(Ghana) Joe Wollacott	League Two Team Of The Week Match Day 3	
1	GK	(Ghana) Joe Wollacott	League Two Team Of The Week Match Day 4	
1	GK	(Ghana) Joe Wollacott	League Two Team Of The Week Match Day 16	
1	GK	(Ghana) Joe Wollacott	League Two Team Of The Week Match Day 30	
1	GK	(Ghana) Joe Wollacott	English Football League Team Of The Week Match Day 30	
1	GK	(Ghana) Joe Wollacott	League Two Team Of The Week Match Day 31	
1	GK	(Ghana) Joe Wollacott	League Two Team Of The Season	
11	FW	(England) Harry McKirdy	League Two Team Of The Week Match Day 11	
11	FW	(England) Harry McKirdy	League Two Team Of The Week Match Day 25	
11	FW	(England) Harry McKirdy	English Football League Team Of The Week Match Day 22	
11	FW	(England) Harry McKirdy	FIFA 22 Team Of The Week 16	
11	FW	(England) Harry McKirdy	League Two Team Of The Week Match Day 30	
11	FW	(England) Harry McKirdy	League Two Team Of The Week Match Day 31	
11	FW	(England) Harry McKirdy	English Football League Team Of The Week Match Day 31	
11	FW	(England) Harry McKirdy	League Two Team Of The Week Match Day 34	
11	FW	(England) Harry McKirdy	League Two Team Of The Week Match Day 43	
11	FW	(England) Harry McKirdy	English Football League Team Of The Week Match Day 43	
11	FW	(England) Harry McKirdy	League Two Team Of The Season	
12	GK	(England) Lewis Ward	League Two Team Of The Week Match Day 11	
12	GK	(England) Lewis Ward	FIFA 22 Team Of The Week 4	
20	MF	(Wales) Jonny Williams	League Two Team Of The Week Match Day 17	
25	MF	(England) Louis Reed	FA Cup First Round Goal Of The Round	
25	MF	(England) Louis Reed	League Two Team Of The Week Match Day 22	
9	FW	(England) Josh Davison	League Two Team Of The Week Match Day 31	
9	FW	(England) Josh Davison	League Two Team Of The Week Match Day 41	
9	FW	(England) Josh Davison	English Football League Team Of The Week Match Day 41	
24	DF	(England) Rob Hunt	League Two Team Of The Week Match Day 30	
24	DF	(England) Rob Hunt	League Two Team Of The Week Match Day 31	
3	DF	(England) Ellis Iandolo	League Two Team Of The Week Match Day 36	
4	DF	(England) Dion Conroy	League Two Team Of The Week Match Day 36	
23	DF	(England) Joe Tomlinson	English Football League February Young Player Of The Month	
18	DF	(England) Mandela Egbo	League Two Team Of The Week Match Day 41	
19	FW	(England) Louie Barry	League Two Team Of The Week Match Day 41	
19	FW	(England) Louie Barry	English Football League Team Of The Week Match Day 41	
6	DF	(France) Mathieu Baudry	League Two Team Of The Week Match Day 43	
6	DF	(France) Mathieu Baudry	English Football League Team Of The Week Match Day 43	
10	MF	(England) Jack Payne	League Two Team Of The Week Match Day 46	

=== Management ===
No.	Manager	Award	Source
N/A	(England) Ben Garner	League Two Team Of The Week Match Day 22	
N/A	(England) Ben Garner	English Football League Team Of The Week Match Day 22	

== International call-ups ==
No.	Pos.	Player	Month	Missed Games	International Games	Source
20	MF	(Wales) Jonny Williams	September	Stevenage, Arsenal U21	Finland, Belarus, Estonia	
20	MF	(Wales) Jonny Williams	October	Forest Green Rovers, Plymouth Argyle	Czech Republic, Estonia	
20	MF	(Wales) Jonny Williams	November	Crawley Town	Belarus, Belgium	
20	MF	(Wales) Jonny Williams	March	Forest Green Rovers	Austria, Czech Republic	
22	DF	(England) Kaine Kesler Hayden	September	Stevenage, Arsenal U21	Romania U20	
22	DF	(England) Kaine Kesler Hayden	October	Forest Green Rovers, Plymouth Argyle	Italy U20, Czech Republic U20	
22	DF	(England) Kaine Kesler Hayden	November	Crawley Town	Portugal U20	
42	MF	(Jamaica) Anthony Grant	September	Stevenage, Arsenal U21	Mexico, Panama, Costa Rica	
42	MF	(Jamaica) Anthony Grant	October	Forest Green Rovers, Plymouth Argyle	Canada, Honduras	
42	MF	(Jamaica) Anthony Grant	November	Crawley Town	El Salvador, United States	
1	GK	(Ghana) Joe Wollacott	October	Forest Green Rovers, Plymouth Argyle	Zimbabwe	
1	GK	(Ghana) Joe Wollacott	November	Crawley Town	Ethiopia, South Africa	
1	GK	(Ghana) Joe Wollacott	January	Manchester City, Mansfield Town, Port Vale	Algeria, Morocco, Gabon, Comoros	
1	GK	(Ghana) Joe Wollacott	March	Forest Green Rovers	Nigeria	
19	FW	(Republic of Ireland) Alex Gilbert	October	Forest Green Rovers, Plymouth Argyle	Luxembourg U21, Montenegro U21	
16	DF	(Republic of Ireland) Jake O'Brien	March	Forest Green Rovers	Sweden U21	

== Transfers ==
=== Transfers in ===
Date	Position	Nationality	Name	From	Fee	Ref.
1 July 2021	GK	(Ghana)	Joe Wollacott	(England) Bristol City	Free Transfer	
1 July 2021	CB	(Republic of Ireland)	Pierce Sweeney	(England) Exeter City	Free Transfer	
26 July 2021	CAM	(England)	Ben Gladwin	(England) Milton Keynes Dons	Free Transfer	
27 July 2021	GK	(England)	Lewis Ward	(England) Exeter City	Free Transfer	
3 August 2021	CB	(England)	Akin Odimayo	Free agent	Free Transfer	
4 August 2021	LW	(England)	Harry McKirdy	(England) Port Vale	Free Transfer	
4 August 2021	CAM	(Italy)	Mo Dabre	(England) Volenti Academy	Free Transfer	
5 August 2021	CDM	(Jamaica)	Anthony Grant	Free agent	Free Transfer	
6 August 2021	CM	(England)	Louis Reed	(England) Peterborough United	Free Transfer	
7 August 2021	CM	(England)	Ryan East	(England) Reading	Free Transfer	
10 August 2021	CAM	(England)	Ricky Aguiar	(England) Worthing	Free Transfer	
13 August 2021	CAM	(Wales)	Jonny Williams	(Wales) Cardiff City	Free Transfer	
19 August 2021	RM	(England)	Jayden Mitchell-Lawson	(England) Derby County	Free Transfer	
3 January 2022	GK	(England)	Emmanuel Idem	Free agent	Free Transfer	
12 March 2022	RB	(England)	Mandela Egbo	Free agent	Free Transfer	

=== Loans in ===
Date from	Position	Nationality	Name	From	Date until	Ref.
31 July 2021	ST	(England)	Tyreece Simpson	(England) Ipswich Town	23 January 2022	
2 August 2021	RB	(England)	Kaine Kesler Hayden	(England) Aston Villa	9 January 2022	
6 August 2021	CB	(England)	Romoney Crichlow	(England) Huddersfield Town	13 January 2022	
31 August 2021	LW	(Republic of Ireland)	Alex Gilbert	(England) Brentford	4 January 2022	
4 January 2022	CB	(Republic of Ireland)	Jake O'Brien	(England) Crystal Palace	End Of Season	
24 January 2022	ST	(England)	Josh Davison	(England) Charlton Athletic	End Of Season	
28 January 2022	ST	(England)	Louie Barry	(England) Aston Villa	End Of Season	
29 January 2022	CB	(Wales)	Brandon Cooper	(Wales) Swansea City	End Of Season	
31 January 2022	LB	(England)	Joe Tomlinson	(England) Peterborough United	End Of Season	

=== Loans out ===
Date from	Position	Nationality	Name	To	Date until	Ref.
17 October 2021	CAM	(England)	Ricky Aguiar	(England) Chippenham Town	13 November 2021	
12 November 2021	CAM	(England)	Ricky Aguiar	(England) Chippenham Town	8 January 2022	
12 November 2021	ST	(England)	Harry Parsons	(England) Chippenham Town	11 December 2021	
7 January 2022	CB	(England)	Harrison Minturn	(England) Chippenham Town	7 February 2022	
11 February 2022	GK	(England)	Emmanuel Idem	(England) Brentwood Town	4 March 2022	
16 February 2022	CB	(England)	Harrison Minturn	(England) Chippenham Town	10 March 2022	
25 February 2022	CAM	(Italy)	Mo Dabre	(England) Chippenham Town	End Of Season	
4 March 2022	GK	(England)	Emmanuel Idem	(England) Melksham Town	End Of Season	
25 March 2022	CM	(England)	Levi Francis	(England) Chippenham Town	End Of Season	
25 March 2022	CB	(England)	Callum Winchcombe	(England) Chippenham Town	End Of Season	

=== Transfers out ===
Date	Position	Nationality	Name	To	Fee	Ref.
30 June 2021	CB	(England)	Tom Broadbent	(England) Eastleigh	Released	
30 June 2021	RB	(Scotland)	Paul Caddis	Free agent	Released	
30 June 2021	GK	(Northern Ireland)	Lee Camp	(Wales) Wrexham	Released	
30 June 2021	CB	(Indonesia)	Anthony Cheshire	(England) Bracknell Town	Released	
30 June 2021	CB	(England)	Zeki Fryers	(England) Stockport County	Released	
30 June 2021	CM	(Italy)	Massimo Giamattei	(England) Bracknell Town	Released	
30 June 2021	RW	(Jamaica)	Joel Grant	(England) Grimsby Town	Released	
30 June 2021	LW	(Barbados)	Hallam Hope	(England) Oldham Athletic	Released	
30 June 2021	CM	(England)	John Johnston	Free agent	Released	
30 June 2021	GK	(England)	Archie Matthews	(England) Birmingham City	Released	
30 June 2021	CDM	(Republic of the Congo)	Christopher Missilou	(Wales) Newport County	Released	
30 June 2021	CM	(England)	Matt Palmer	(England) Notts County	Released	
30 June 2021	CAM	(England)	Scott Twine	(England) Milton Keynes Dons	Compensation	
2 July 2021	CB	(Republic of Ireland)	Pierce Sweeney	(England) Exeter City	Mutual Consent	
9 July 2021	CB	(England)	Taylor Curran	(England) Maidstone United	Free Transfer	
23 July 2021	LB	(England)	Jonathan Grounds	(England) Exeter City	Mutual consent	
30 July 2021	ST	(Jersey)	Brett Pitman	(England) Bristol Rovers	Mutual consent	
28 January 2022	CDM	(Jamaica)	Anthony Grant	(England) Scunthorpe United	Mutual consent	
