= Donell Gordon =

English association football player

Personal information
- Full name: Donell David Gordon
- Date of birth: 21 November 2003 (age 22)
- Position: Midfielder

Youth career
- –2021: Swindon Town

Senior career*
| Years | Team | Apps | (Gls) |
| 2021–2022 | Swindon Town | 0 | (0) |
| 2022 | → Highworth Town (loan) | 3 | (0) |
- * Club domestic league appearances and goals as of 00:03, 13 December 2021 (UTC)

Donell David Gordon (born 21 November 2003) is an English professional footballer who last played as a midfielder for League Two club Swindon Town.

== Career ==
Gordon started his career with Swindon Town, making his first-team debut during an EFL Trophy second round tie in November 2021 against Colchester United, replacing fellow academy graduate debutant, Levi Francis in the 57th minute as the Robins fell to a 2–1 defeat.

== Career statistics ==
As of match played 22 March 2022

Appearances and goals by club, season and competition
| Club | Season | League | | | FA Cup | | League Cup | | Other | | Total | |
| Club | Season | Division | Apps | Goals | Apps | Goals | Apps | Goals | Apps | Goals | Apps | Goals |
|---|---|---|---|---|---|---|---|---|---|---|---|---|
| Swindon Town | 2021–22 | League Two | 0 | 0 | 0 | 0 | 0 | 0 | 1 (Note: Appearance in the EFL Trophy) | 0 | 1 | 0 |
| Highworth Town (loan) | 2021–22 | Southern League Division One South | 3 | 0 | — | | — | | — | | 3 | 0 |
| Career total | | | 3 | 0 | 0 | 0 | 0 | 0 | 1 | 0 | 4 | 0 |
