= 2021–22 EFL League Two =

EFL League Two
- Season: 2021–22
- Dates: 7 August 2021 – 7 May 2022
- Champions: Forest Green Rovers
- Promoted: Forest Green Rovers; Exeter City; Bristol Rovers; Port Vale
- Relegated: Oldham Athletic; Scunthorpe United
- Matches: 552
- Goals: 1,359 (2.46 per match)
- Top goalscorer: Dom Telford (25 goals)
- Biggest home win: Bristol Rovers 7–0 Scunthorpe United (7 May 2022)
- Biggest away win: Scunthorpe United 0–4 Exeter City (11 September 2021); Stevenage 0–4 Forest Green Rovers (18 September 2021); Tranmere Rovers 0–4 Forest Green Rovers (29 January 2022); Stevenage 0–4 Bristol Rovers (19 February 2022); Scunthorpe United 0–4 Mansfield Town (9 April 2022)
- Highest scoring: Oldham Athletic 5–5 Forest Green Rovers (11 December 2021)

The 2021–22 EFL League Two (referred to as the Sky Bet League Two for sponsorship reasons) was the 18th season of Football League Two under its current title and the 30th season under its current league division format. The season is known for the finish to the last automatic spot (3rd) between Bristol Rovers and Northampton Town. Bristol Rovers started the day needing to better the result of 3rd placed Northampton Town, or to win by 5 goals more than their rivals. Northampton Town beat 22nd-placed Barrow 3-1, and by halftime, Bristol Rovers seemed on course for a playoff position despite leading 2-0 against Scunthorpe United, thanks in part to Lobley's own goal. However, in the second half the team netted 5 goals against a youthful Scunthorpe side. With just 5 minutes remaining, Anderson's header propelled Bristol Rovers into the automatic promotion spot (Anderson's crucial winner against Colchester United earlier in March secured the team's place in the playoff ranks for the first time this season). The final moments saw Bristol Rovers clinch automatic promotion from League Two based on goals scored, as the two teams were tied on points and goal difference. Manager Joey Barton implored fans to clear the pitch after Anderson's decisive goal triggered a pitch invasion, halting the match for nearly 20 minutes. The remaining 5 minutes and added time were played without incident, sealing Bristol Rovers' immediate and triumphant return to EFL League One following last season's relegation, beating already relegated Scunthorpe United 7-0.

Scunthorpe were relegated along with Oldham Athletic, who became the first former FA Premier League member to be relegated to the fifth tier.

== Team changes ==
=== To League Two ===
Promoted from National League

- Sutton United
- Hartlepool United

Relegated from League One

- Bristol Rovers
- Swindon Town
- Northampton Town
- Rochdale

=== From League Two ===
Promoted to League One

- Cheltenham Town
- Cambridge United
- Bolton Wanderers
- Morecambe

Relegated to National League

- Grimsby Town
- Southend United

== Stadiums ==
Locations of the 2021–22 EFL League Two teams
Greater Manchester League Two football clubs

| Team | Location | Stadium | Capacity |
|---|---|---|---|
| Barrow | Barrow-in-Furness | Holker Street | 5,045 |
| Bradford City | Bradford | Valley Parade | 25,136 |
| Bristol Rovers | Bristol | Memorial Stadium | 12,300 |
| Carlisle United | Carlisle | Brunton Park | 18,202 |
| Colchester United | Colchester | Colchester Community Stadium | 10,105 |
| Crawley Town | Crawley | Broadfield Stadium | 5,996 |
| Exeter City | Exeter | St. James Park | 8,696 |
| Forest Green Rovers | Nailsworth | The New Lawn | 5,147 |
| Harrogate Town | Harrogate | Wetherby Road | 5,000 |
| Hartlepool United | Hartlepool | Victoria Park | 7,856 |
| Leyton Orient | London (Leyton) | Brisbane Road | 9,271 |
| Mansfield Town | Mansfield | Field Mill | 9,186 |
| Newport County | Newport | Rodney Parade | 7,850 |
| Northampton Town | Northampton | Sixfields Stadium | 7,798 |
| Oldham Athletic | Oldham | Boundary Park | 13,513 |
| Port Vale | Burslem | Vale Park | 20,552 |
| Rochdale | Rochdale | Spotland Stadium | 10,249 |
| Salford City | Salford | Moor Lane | 5,108 |
| Scunthorpe United | Scunthorpe | Glanford Park | 9,088 |
| Stevenage | Stevenage | Broadhall Way | 7,300 |
| Sutton United | London (Sutton) | Gander Green Lane | 5,013 |
| Swindon Town | Swindon | County Ground | 15,728 |
| Tranmere Rovers | Birkenhead | Prenton Park | 16,789 |
| Walsall | Walsall | Bescot Stadium | 11,300 |

== Personnel and sponsoring ==
| Team | Manager | Captain | Kit manufacturer | Sponsor |
|---|---|---|---|---|
| Barrow | (England) Phil Brown | (England) Jason Taylor | (Spain) Joma | JF Hornby & Co. |
| Bradford City | (Wales) Mark Hughes | (Republic of Ireland) Paudie O'Connor | (England) Avec Sport | JCT600 |
| Bristol Rovers | (England) Joey Barton | (Scotland) Paul Coutts | (Italy) Macron | Utilita |
| Carlisle United | (England) Paul Simpson | (England) Callum Guy | (Italy) Erreà | Thomas Graham |
| Colchester United | (England) Wayne Brown (caretaker) | (New Zealand) Tommy Smith | (Italy) Macron | Texo Scaffolding (Home); JobServe (Away / Third) |
| Crawley Town | (England) Lewis Young (caretaker) | (England) George Francomb | (Italy) Erreà | The People's Pension |
| Exeter City | (England) Matt Taylor | (England) Matt Jay | (Spain) Joma | Carpetright |
| Forest Green Rovers | (Wales) Rob Edwards | (Jamaica) Jamille Matt | (England) PlayerLayer | Ecotricity |
| Harrogate Town | (England) Simon Weaver | (England) Josh Falkingham | (United States) New Balance | Strata |
| Hartlepool United | (England) Michael Nelson (caretaker) | (England) Nicky Featherstone | (Republic of Ireland) O'Neills | Orangebox Training Solutions |
| Leyton Orient | (England) Richie Wellens | (England) Darren Pratley | (United States) New Balance | Multiple charities (Note: Tottenham Hotspur player Harry Kane, who played for Leyton Orient early in his career, bought the club's shirt sponsorship for the 2021–22 season, his second season of doing this. Each of the team's shirts will feature a different message or charity chosen by Kane: Tommy Club (home shirt), Haven House Children's Hospice (away shirt), and Mind (third shirt).) |
| Mansfield Town | (England) Nigel Clough | (England) Ollie Clarke | (England) Surridge | One Call |
| Newport County | (Wales) James Rowberry | (England) Matty Dolan | (Denmark) Hummel | Alzheimers Society Cymru |
| Northampton Town | (Australia) Jon Brady | (England) Joseph Mills | (Denmark) Hummel | University of Northampton |
| Oldham Athletic | (Republic of Ireland) John Sheridan | (England) Carl Piergianni | (Denmark) Hummel | Bartercard |
| Port Vale | (England) Darrell Clarke | (England) Tom Conlon | (Italy) Erreà | Synectics Solutions |
| Rochdale | (Scotland) Robbie Stockdale | (Republic of Ireland) Eoghan O'Connell | (Italy) Erreà | Crown Oil Ltd |
| Salford City | (England) Gary Bowyer | (England) Ashley Eastham | (Italy) Kappa | TalkTalk |
| Scunthorpe United | (England) Keith Hill | (England) Liam Feeney | (Italy) Macron | Cancer Research UK |
| Stevenage | (Scotland) Steve Evans | (Scotland) Scott Cuthbert | (Italy) Macron | Prime Gaming |
| Sutton United | (England) Matt Gray | (England) Craig Eastmond | (Italy) Macron | Angel Plastics |
| Swindon Town | (England) Ben Garner | (England) Dion Conroy | (Germany) Puma | Bartercard |
| Tranmere Rovers | (Scotland) Micky Mellon | (England) Peter Clarke | (Indonesia) Mills | Essar |
| Walsall | (Wales) Michael Flynn | (England) Joss Labadie | (Italy) Erreà | HomeServe |

== Managerial changes ==
| Team | Outgoing manager | Manner of departure | Date of vacancy | Position in table | Incoming manager | Date of appointment |
|---|---|---|---|---|---|---|
| Leyton Orient | (Jamaica) Jobi McAnuff | End of Interim spell | 8 May 2021 | Pre-season | (Wales) Kenny Jackett | 21 May 2021 |
| Swindon Town | (Scotland) Tommy Wright | End of Interim spell | 8 May 2021 | Pre-season | (England) John McGreal | 26 May 2021 |
| Bradford City | (England) Mark Trueman (England) Conor Sellars | Sacked | 10 May 2021 | Pre-season | (Scotland) Derek Adams | 4 June 2021 |
| Walsall | (England) Brian Dutton | Sacked | 10 May 2021 | Pre-season | (England) Matthew Taylor | 19 May 2021 |
| Barrow | (England) Rob Kelly | End of Caretaker spell | 14 May 2021 | Pre-season | (England) Mark Cooper | 28 May 2021 |
| Tranmere Rovers | (England) Ian Dawes | End of Caretaker spell | 23 May 2021 | Pre-season | (Scotland) Micky Mellon | 1 June 2021 |
| Forest Green Rovers | (England) Jimmy Ball | End of Caretaker spell | 23 May 2021 | Pre-season | (Wales) Rob Edwards | 27 May 2021 |
| Swindon Town | (England) John McGreal | Mutual consent | 25 June 2021 | Pre-season | (England) Ben Garner | 21 July 2021 |
| Rochdale | (Republic of Ireland) Brian Barry-Murphy | Resigned | 30 June 2021 | Pre-season | (Scotland) Robbie Stockdale | 10 July 2021 |
| Newport County | (Wales) Michael Flynn | Resigned | 1 October 2021 | 15th | (Wales) James Rowberry | 19 October 2021 |
| Carlisle United | (England) Chris Beech | Sacked | 10 October 2021 | 22nd | (England) Keith Millen | 26 October 2021 |
| Scunthorpe United | (England) Neil Cox | Sacked | 1 November 2021 | 24th | (England) Keith Hill | 5 November 2021 |
| Hartlepool United | (England) Dave Challinor | Signed by Stockport County | 1 November 2021 | 10th | (England) Graeme Lee | 1 December 2021 |
| Stevenage | (England) Alex Revell | Sacked | 15 November 2021 | 21st | (England) Paul Tisdale | 28 November 2021 |
| Oldham Athletic | (England) Keith Curle | Sacked | 24 November 2021 | 22nd | (Tunisia) Selim Benachour (Interim) | 24 November 2021 |
| Colchester United | (England) Hayden Mullins | Sacked | 19 January 2021 | 22nd | (England) Wayne Brown (Interim) | 22 January 2022 |
| Oldham Athletic | (Tunisia) Selim Benachour | End of Interim Spell | 22 January 2022 | 24th | (Republic of Ireland) John Sheridan | 22 January 2022 |
| Walsall | (England) Matthew Taylor | Sacked | 9 February 2022 | 21st | (Wales) Michael Flynn | 15 February 2022 |
| Bradford City | (Scotland) Derek Adams | Sacked | 15 February 2022 | 11th | (Wales) Mark Hughes | 24 February 2022 |
| Leyton Orient | (Wales) Kenny Jackett | Sacked | 22 February 2022 | 18th | (England) Richie Wellens | 9 March 2022 |
| Carlisle United | (England) Keith Millen | Mutual consent | 23 February 2022 | 23rd | (England) Paul Simpson | 23 February 2022 |
| Stevenage | (England) Paul Tisdale | Sacked | 16 March 2022 | 22nd | (Scotland) Steve Evans | 16 March 2022 |
| Barrow | (England) Mark Cooper | Mutual consent | 20 March 2022 | 21st | (England) Phil Brown | 21 March 2022 |
| Hartlepool United | (England) Graeme Lee | Sacked | 5 May 2022 | 16th | (England) Michael Nelson (caretaker) | 5 May 2022 |
| Crawley Town | (England) John Yems | Mutual consent | 6 May 2022 | 16th | (England) Lewis Young (caretaker) | 6 May 2022 |

== League table ==
| Pos | Team | Pld | W | D | L | GF | GA | GD | Pts | Promotion, qualification or relegation |
|---|---|---|---|---|---|---|---|---|---|---|
| 1 | Forest Green Rovers (C, P) | 46 | 23 | 15 | 8 | 75 | 44 | +31 | 84 | Promotion to EFL League One |
| 2 | Exeter City (P) | 46 | 23 | 15 | 8 | 65 | 41 | +24 | 84 | Promotion to EFL League One |
| 3 | Bristol Rovers (P) | 46 | 23 | 11 | 12 | 71 | 49 | +22 | 80 | Promotion to EFL League One |
| 4 | Northampton Town | 46 | 23 | 11 | 12 | 60 | 38 | +22 | 80 | Qualification for League Two play-offs |
| 5 | Port Vale (O, P) | 46 | 22 | 12 | 12 | 67 | 46 | +21 | 78 | Qualification for League Two play-offs |
| 6 | Swindon Town | 46 | 22 | 11 | 13 | 77 | 54 | +23 | 77 | Qualification for League Two play-offs |
| 7 | Mansfield Town | 46 | 22 | 11 | 13 | 67 | 52 | +15 | 77 | Qualification for League Two play-offs |
| 8 | Sutton United | 46 | 22 | 10 | 14 | 69 | 53 | +16 | 76 | |
| 9 | Tranmere Rovers | 46 | 21 | 12 | 13 | 53 | 40 | +13 | 75 | |
| 10 | Salford City | 46 | 19 | 13 | 14 | 60 | 46 | +14 | 70 | |
| 11 | Newport County | 46 | 19 | 12 | 15 | 67 | 58 | +9 | 69 | |
| 12 | Crawley Town | 46 | 17 | 10 | 19 | 56 | 66 | −10 | 61 | |
| 13 | Leyton Orient | 46 | 14 | 16 | 16 | 62 | 47 | +15 | 58 | |
| 14 | Bradford City | 46 | 14 | 16 | 16 | 53 | 55 | −2 | 58 | |
| 15 | Colchester United | 46 | 14 | 13 | 19 | 48 | 60 | −12 | 55 | |
| 16 | Walsall | 46 | 14 | 12 | 20 | 47 | 60 | −13 | 54 | |
| 17 | Hartlepool United | 46 | 14 | 12 | 20 | 44 | 64 | −20 | 54 | |
| 18 | Rochdale | 46 | 12 | 17 | 17 | 51 | 59 | −8 | 53 | |
| 19 | Harrogate Town | 46 | 14 | 11 | 21 | 64 | 75 | −11 | 53 | |
| 20 | Carlisle United | 46 | 14 | 11 | 21 | 39 | 62 | −23 | 53 | |
| 21 | Stevenage | 46 | 11 | 14 | 21 | 45 | 68 | −23 | 47 | |
| 22 | Barrow | 46 | 10 | 14 | 22 | 44 | 57 | −13 | 44 | |
| 23 | Oldham Athletic (R) | 46 | 9 | 11 | 26 | 46 | 75 | −29 | 38 | Relegation to National League |
| 24 | Scunthorpe United (R) | 46 | 4 | 14 | 28 | 29 | 90 | −61 | 26 | Relegation to National League |

Source: EFL Official Website
Rules for classification: 1) Points; 2) Goal difference; 3) Number of goals scored; 4) Head-to-head results; 5) Wins; 6) Away goals; 7) Penalty points (sec 9.5); 8) 12-point sending off offences
(C) Champions; (O) Play-off winners; (P) Promoted; (R) Relegated

== Play-offs ==
Semi-finals
4 | Northampton Town | 1 | 0 | 1
7 | Mansfield Town | 2 | 1 | 3
5 | Port Vale | 1 | 1 | 2
6 | Swindon Town | 2 | 0 | 2

Final
7 | Mansfield Town | 0
5 | Port Vale | 3

First leg

14 May 2022
19:45

| Mansfield Town | 2–1 | Northampton Town |
|---|---|---|
| Oates 13'; Bowery 32' | Report | Koiki 61' |

Field Mill, Mansfield
Attendance: 7,469
Referee: Anthony Backhouse
15 May 2022
12:00

| Swindon Town | 2–1 | Port Vale |
|---|---|---|
| McKirdy 26', 68' | Report | Wilson 83' |

County Ground, Swindon
Attendance: 14,086
Referee: Ross Joyce

Second leg

18 May 2022
19:45

| Northampton Town | 0–1 | Mansfield Town |
|---|---|---|
| | Report | McLaughlin 32' |

Sixfields Stadium, Northampton
Attendance: 7,619
Referee: Ben Toner

Mansfield Town won 3–1 on aggregate.

19 May 2022
19:45

| Port Vale | 1–0 | Swindon Town |
|---|---|---|
| | Report |

Vale Park, Burslem
Attendance: 11,669
Referee: Seb Stockbridge

Port Vale won 2-2 on aggregate, 6-5 on penalties.

=== Final ===
28 May 2022
16:00 BST

| Mansfield Town | 0–3 | Port Vale |
|---|---|---|
| | Report | Harratt 20'; Wilson 24'; Benning 85' |

Wembley Stadium, London
Attendance: 37,303
Referee: Jarred Gillett

== Results ==
| Home \ Away | BRW | BRA | BRI | CAR | COL | CRA | EXE | FOR | HAR | HAT | LEY | MAN | NEW | NOR | OLD | POR | ROC | SAL | SCU | STE | SUT | SWI | TRA | WAL |
|---|---|---|---|---|---|---|---|---|---|---|---|---|---|---|---|---|---|---|---|---|---|---|---|---|
| Barrow | — | 1–2 | 1–1 | 1–2 | 2–3 | 0–1 | 0–0 | 4–0 | 0–0 | 3–2 | 1–1 | 1–3 | 2–1 | 1–3 | 0–0 | 1–2 | 1–2 | 0–2 | 1–1 | 0–0 | 1–0 | 2–0 | 1–1 | 1–1 |
| Bradford City | 1–1 | — | 2–2 | 2–0 | 0–0 | 1–2 | 0–1 | 1–1 | 1–3 | 1–3 | 1–1 | 0–2 | 0–0 | 1–1 | 2–1 | 1–2 | 2–0 | 2–1 | 2–1 | 4–1 | 2–2 | 1–2 | 1–1 | 1–1 |
| Bristol Rovers | 1–0 | 2–1 | — | 3–0 | 1–0 | 1–0 | 1–1 | 0–0 | 3–0 | 2–0 | 1–3 | 0–0 | 1–3 | 2–1 | 1–0 | 1–2 | 4–2 | 1–0 | 7–0 | 0–2 | 2–0 | 1–3 | 2–2 | 1–0 |
| Carlisle United | 0–0 | 2–0 | 1–0 | — | 0–0 | 1–1 | 0–1 | 0–2 | 0–2 | 0–0 | 1–1 | 1–0 | 1–2 | 2–1 | 0–0 | 1–3 | 2–0 | 2–1 | 2–2 | 2–1 | 0–2 | 0–3 | 0–1 | 1–0 |
| Colchester United | 0–2 | 3–0 | 1–1 | 2–2 | — | 0–1 | 3–1 | 0–1 | 1–0 | 1–2 | 2–2 | 1–1 | 1–1 | 0–1 | 1–1 | 1–0 | 1–1 | 0–2 | 2–1 | 0–2 | 1–3 | 1–1 | 1–0 | 2–2 |
| Crawley Town | 1–0 | 2–1 | 1–2 | 2–1 | 3–1 | — | 1–3 | 2–1 | 2–2 | 0–1 | 0–2 | 1–2 | 1–1 | 0–0 | 2–2 | 1–4 | 1–0 | 2–1 | 0–0 | 2–2 | 0–1 | 3–1 | 0–1 | 1–0 |
| Exeter City | 2–1 | 0–0 | 4–1 | 2–1 | 2–0 | 2–1 | — | 0–0 | 4–3 | 0–0 | 1–0 | 2–1 | 2–2 | 1–2 | 2–1 | 0–1 | 2–0 | 0–0 | 2–0 | 2–1 | 2–0 | 3–1 | 0–1 | 2–2 |
| Forest Green Rovers | 2–0 | 0–2 | 2–0 | 3–0 | 2–0 | 6–3 | 0–0 | — | 1–3 | 1–1 | 1–1 | 1–0 | 2–0 | 1–0 | 2–0 | 0–2 | 2–1 | 3–1 | 1–0 | 2–0 | 2–1 | 0–2 | 0–0 | 0–1 |
| Harrogate Town | 2–1 | 2–0 | 0–1 | 3–0 | 1–2 | 1–3 | 1–1 | 1–4 | — | 1–2 | 0–3 | 0–0 | 2–2 | 1–2 | 3–0 | 1–1 | 3–2 | 0–2 | 6–1 | 0–0 | 0–2 | 1–4 | 2–2 | 1–1 |
| Hartlepool United | 3–1 | 0–2 | 1–0 | 2–1 | 0–2 | 1–0 | 1–1 | 1–3 | 3–2 | — | 0–0 | 2–2 | 1–2 | 2–1 | 0–0 | 0–1 | 2–1 | 0–2 | 0–0 | 1–1 | 1–1 | 0–3 | 1–0 | 2–0 |
| Leyton Orient | 2–0 | 2–0 | 0–2 | 0–1 | 0–1 | 1–2 | 3–0 | 1–1 | 0–2 | 5–0 | — | 0–0 | 0–1 | 2–4 | 4–0 | 0–0 | 3–1 | 0–2 | 3–0 | 2–2 | 4–1 | 4–1 | 0–1 | 0–0 |
| Mansfield Town | 0–1 | 2–3 | 2–1 | 1–0 | 2–1 | 2–0 | 2–1 | 2–2 | 1–3 | 3–2 | 2–0 | — | 2–1 | 1–0 | 0–0 | 1–1 | 1–1 | 2–1 | 3–1 | 2–0 | 2–3 | 3–2 | 2–0 | 2–0 |
| Newport County | 2–1 | 0–0 | 1–0 | 2–2 | 1–2 | 1–2 | 0–1 | 1–1 | 4–0 | 2–3 | 2–2 | 1–1 | — | 0–1 | 3–3 | 2–1 | 0–2 | 0–2 | 3–0 | 5–0 | 3–2 | 1–2 | 4–2 | 2–1 |
| Northampton Town | 0–1 | 0–0 | 0–1 | 3–0 | 3–0 | 0–1 | 1–1 | 1–1 | 3–0 | 2–0 | 1–0 | 2–0 | 1–0 | — | 2–1 | 1–0 | 1–3 | 1–0 | 2–0 | 3–0 | 0–2 | 1–1 | 3–2 | 1–1 |
| Oldham Athletic | 0–3 | 2–0 | 2–1 | 1–2 | 1–2 | 3–3 | 0–2 | 5–5 | 1–2 | 0–0 | 2–0 | 1–2 | 0–1 | 0–2 | — | 3–2 | 0–0 | 1–2 | 1–3 | 3–0 | 1–3 | 1–3 | 0–1 | 1–3 |
| Port Vale | 3–1 | 1–1 | 1–3 | 0–0 | 3–0 | 4–1 | 0–0 | 1–1 | 2–0 | 2–0 | 3–2 | 3–1 | 1–2 | 0–0 | 3–2 | — | 2–3 | 0–1 | 1–0 | 2–0 | 2–0 | 1–3 | 0–0 | 0–1 |
| Rochdale | 0–0 | 0–0 | 3–4 | 2–0 | 1–1 | 0–1 | 1–1 | 1–2 | 3–3 | 2–1 | 2–2 | 0–1 | 3–0 | 1–0 | 0–1 | 1–1 | — | 1–1 | 0–0 | 2–2 | 3–2 | 0–0 | 1–0 | 1–0 |
| Salford City | 2–2 | 1–0 | 1–1 | 2–1 | 0–3 | 2–1 | 1–2 | 1–1 | 2–0 | 2–0 | 1–1 | 2–2 | 3–0 | 2–2 | 2–0 | 0–1 | 0–0 | — | 5–1 | 1–0 | 0–0 | 0–1 | 1–1 | 2–1 |
| Scunthorpe United | 0–1 | 1–1 | 2–3 | 0–1 | 1–3 | 2–1 | 0–4 | 0–2 | 0–3 | 1–1 | 1–1 | 0–4 | 0–1 | 0–0 | 0–1 | 0–1 | 1–2 | 1–1 | — | 1–1 | 1–1 | 1–3 | 1–0 | 1–0 |
| Stevenage | 1–0 | 0–1 | 0–4 | 0–2 | 1–0 | 2–1 | 2–2 | 0–4 | 3–0 | 2–0 | 0–0 | 1–2 | 0–2 | 1–2 | 0–1 | 1–1 | 1–0 | 4–2 | 1–1 | — | 3–3 | 1–1 | 2–0 | 3–1 |
| Sutton United | 1–0 | 1–4 | 1–1 | 4–0 | 3–2 | 3–0 | 2–1 | 1–1 | 1–0 | 1–0 | 1–0 | 2–0 | 1–0 | 0–0 | 1–2 | 4–3 | 3–0 | 0–0 | 4–1 | 2–1 | — | 1–2 | 1–1 | 0–1 |
| Swindon Town | 2–1 | 1–3 | 1–1 | 1–2 | 0–0 | 1–1 | 1–2 | 2–1 | 1–1 | 3–1 | 1–2 | 1–0 | 0–1 | 5–2 | 1–0 | 1–2 | 2–2 | 1–2 | 3–0 | 0–0 | 2–1 | — | 0–0 | 5–0 |
| Tranmere Rovers | 2–0 | 2–1 | 1–1 | 2–2 | 2–0 | 2–1 | 2–0 | 0–4 | 2–0 | 1–0 | 1–0 | 3–2 | 0–1 | 0–2 | 2–0 | 1–1 | 2–0 | 2–0 | 4–0 | 1–0 | 0–1 | 3–0 | — | 1–0 |
| Walsall | 2–2 | 1–2 | 1–2 | 1–0 | 3–0 | 1–1 | 0–2 | 1–3 | 1–3 | 3–1 | 0–2 | 3–1 | 3–3 | 0–1 | 2–1 | 2–0 | 0–0 | 2–1 | 1–1 | 1–0 | 1–0 | 0–3 | 1–0 | — |

Legend: Blue = home team win; Yellow = draw; Red = away team win.
For upcoming matches, an "a" indicates there is an article about the rivalry between the two participants.

== Season statistics ==
=== Top scorers ===
As of 7 May 2022

| Rank | Player | Club | Goals |
|---|---|---|---|
| 1 | (England) Dom Telford | Newport County | 25 |
| 2 | (England) Matty Stevens | Forest Green Rovers | 23 |
| 3 | (England) Harry McKirdy | Swindon Town | 20 |
| 4 | (Jamaica) Jamille Matt | Forest Green Rovers | 19 |
| 5 | (Wales) Aaron Collins | Bristol Rovers | 16 |
| 6 | (England) Davis Keillor-Dunn | Oldham Athletic | 15 |
| 7 | (England) Matt Jay | Exeter City | 14 |
| 7 | (England) Freddie Sears | Colchester United | 14 |

=== Hat-tricks ===
| Player | For | Against | Result | Date | Ref |
|---|---|---|---|---|---|
| (England) Andy Cook | Bradford City | Stevenage | 4–1 | 17 August 2021 | |
| (Scotland) Nicky Cadden | Forest Green Rovers | Crawley Town | 6–3 | 21 August 2021 | |
| (Republic of Ireland) Aaron Drinan | Leyton Orient | Hartlepool United | 5–0 | 30 October 2021 | |
| (England) Paul Lewis | Northampton Town | Carlisle United | 3–0 | 30 October 2021 | |
| (England) Dom Telford | Newport County | Stevenage | 5–0 | 30 October 2021 | |
| (England) Harry McKirdy^{4} | Swindon Town | Northampton Town | 5–2 | 1 January 2022 | |
| (England) Jack Muldoon | Harrogate Town | Oldham Athletic | 3–0 | 22 January 2022 | |
| (Ghana) Brandon Thomas-Asante | Salford City | Scunthorpe United | 5–1 | 19 March 2022 | |
| (Wales) Aaron Collins | Bristol Rovers | Rochdale | 3–4 | 30 April 2022 | |

Notes

^{4} Player scored 4 goals

== Monthly awards ==
| Month | Manager of the Month | | Player of the Month | | Reference |
|---|---|---|---|---|---|
| August | (Wales) Rob Edwards | Forest Green Rovers | (England) Mathew Stevens | Forest Green Rovers | |
| September | (England) Darrell Clarke | Port Vale | (Scotland) Nicky Cadden | Forest Green Rovers | |
| October | (England) Darrell Clarke | Port Vale | (England) Dom Telford | Newport County | |
| November | (Wales) Rob Edwards | Forest Green Rovers | (England) Dom Telford | Newport County | |
| December | (Scotland) Micky Mellon | Tranmere Rovers | (England) Jake Beesley | Rochdale | |
| January | (Wales) Rob Edwards | Forest Green Rovers | (England) Luke McGee | Forest Green Rovers | |
| February | (England) Matt Taylor | Exeter City | (England) Davis Keillor-Dunn | Oldham Athletic | |
| March | (England) Joey Barton | Bristol Rovers | (Cyprus) Ruel Sotiriou | Leyton Orient | |

== Awards ==
| Award | Winner | Club |
|---|---|---|
| Player of the Season | (England) Kane Wilson | Forest Green Rovers |
| Young Player of the Season | (Republic of Ireland) Finn Azaz | Newport County |

EFL League Two Team of the season

| Pos. | Player | Club | Ref. |
|---|---|---|---|
| GK | (Ghana) Joe Wollacott | Swindon Town | |
| DF | (England) Jon Guthrie | Northampton Town | |
| DF | (England) Peter Clarke | Tranmere Rovers | |
| DF | (England) Jordan Turnbull | Salford City | |
| MF | (England) Kane Wilson | Forest Green Rovers | |
| MF | (France) Timothée Dieng | Exeter City | |
| MF | (Republic of Ireland) Finn Azaz | Newport County | |
| MF | (Scotland) Nicky Cadden | Forest Green Rovers | |
| FW | (England) Harry McKirdy | Swindon Town | |
| FW | (England) Dom Telford | Newport County | |
| FW | (England) Matty Stevens | Forest Green Rovers | |
| Manager | (Wales) Rob Edwards | Forest Green Rovers | |
