= Harry Parsons (English footballer) =

English footballer (born 2002)

Personal information
- Full name: Harry John Parsons
- Date of birth: 9 October 2002 (age 24)
- Place of birth: Swindon, England
- Height: 6 ft 1 in (1.85 m)
- Position: Forward

Team information
- Current team: Bath City
- Number: 19

Youth career
- 2011–2021: Swindon Town

Senior career*
Years	Team	Apps	(Gls)
2019–2023	Swindon Town	17	(0)
2021–2022	→ Chippenham Town (loan)	7	(5)
2022	→ Banbury United (loan)	6	(2)
2022	→ Chippenham Town (loan)	11	(3)
2023	→ Farnborough (loan)	11	(4)
2023–2024	Maidenhead United	12	(0)
2023	→ Banbury United (loan)	3	(0)
2023–2024	→ Weymouth (loan)	24	(3)
2024–2026	Chippenham Town	76	(19)
2026–	Bath City	6	(2)
- * Club domestic league appearances and goals as of 13:40, 6 September 2026 (UTC)

Harry John Parsons (born 9 October 2002) is an English professional footballer who plays as a forward for Southern League Premier Division South club Bath City.

== Career ==
In 2011, Parsons joined Swindon Town's academy after trialling with Reading and Swindon, signing a scholarship with the club in 2019. On 13 November 2019, Parsons made his debut for the club in a 1–0 EFL Trophy loss against Bristol Rovers. On 14 May 2021 it was announced that he had been offered a new contract and it was confirmed as signed the following month.

On 12 November 2021, Parsons joined National League South side Chippenham Town on a one-month loan deal. Against the Dorking Wanderers he scored three goals within 7 minutes. On 10 December 2021, the loan was extended for a further month.

On 26 August 2022, Parsons joined National League North club Banbury United on loan until January 2023. Parsons was recalled on 13 October. On 29 October, Parsons returned for a second loan spell with Chippenham Town. In February 2023, he joined Farnborough on loan until the end of the season. Swindon released Parsons at the end of the 2022–23 season.

Parsons joined Maidenhead United for the 2023–24 season. On 14 November 2023 he joined Banbury United on a one-month loan. When this loan expired, he then joined Weymouth on another 28-day loan. He left Maidenhead at the end of the season after one goal in fifteen appearances.

On 8 June 2024, Parsons re-joined Chippenham Town for the 2024/25 season on a permanent basis.

In June 2026, Parsons joined recently relegated Southern League Premier Division South club Bath City.

== Style of play ==
Swindon under-18's manager David Farrell has labelled Parsons as "raw" and "a pest" up front.

== Career statistics ==
As of match played 5 September 2026

Appearances and goals by club, season and competition
Club	Season	League			FA Cup		League Cup		Other		Total	
Club	Season	Division	Apps	Goals	Apps	Goals	Apps	Goals	Apps	Goals	Apps	Goals
Swindon Town	2019–20	League Two	0	0	0	0	0	0	1 (Note: Appearance(s) in EFL Trophy)	0	1	0
Swindon Town	2020–21	League One	2	0	0	0	0	0	0	0	2	0
Swindon Town	2021–22	League Two	15	0	1	0	1	0	3	0	20	0
Swindon Town	2022–23	League Two	0	0	0	0	1	0	1	0	2	0
Swindon Town	Total		17	0	1	0	2	0	5	0	25	0
Chippenham Town (loan)	2021–22	National League South	7	5	0	0	—		1 (Note: Appearance(s) in FA Trophy)	0	8	5
Banbury United (loan)	2022–23	National League North	6	2	0	0	—		0	0	6	2
Chippenham Town (loan)	2022–23	National League South	11	3	2	1	—		2	1	15	5
Farnborough (loan)	2022–23	National League South	11	4	0	0	—		0	0	11	4
Maidenhead United	2023–24	National League	12	0	2	0	—		1 (Note: Appearance(s) in Berks & Bucks Senior Cup)	1	15	1
Banbury United (loan)	2023–24	National League North	3	0	0	0	—		0	0	3	0
Weymouth (loan)	2023–24	National League South	24	3	0	0	—		0	0	24	3
Chippenham Town	2024–25	National League South	45	9	3	3	—		1	0	49	12
Chippenham Town	2025–26	National League South	31	10	0	0	—		2 (Note: One appearance in FA Trophy, one appearance in Wiltshire Premier Shield)	0	33	10
Chippenham Town	Total		76	19	3	3	—		3	0	82	22
Bath City	2026–27	Southern League; Premier Division South	6	2	1	0	—		0	0	7	2
Career total			173	38	9	4	2	0	12	2	196	45
