= Callum Winchcombe =

English association football player

Personal information
- Full name: Callum George Winchcombe
- Date of birth: 28 November 2003 (age 22)
- Place of birth: Birmingham, West Midlands, England
- Position: Defender

Team information
- Current team: Basingstoke Town

Youth career
- –2015: Procision Football Academy
- 2015–2021: Swindon Town

Senior career*
Years	Team	Apps	(Gls)
2021–2022	Swindon Town	0	(0)
2022	→ Highworth Town (loan)	3	(0)
2022	→ Chippenham Town (loan)	1	(0)
2022–	Basingstoke Town	34	(0)
- * Club domestic league appearances and goals as of 13:07, 11 May 2023 (UTC)

Callum George Winchcombe (born 28 November 2003) is an English professional footballer who plays as a centre back for Isthmian League Premier Division Central club Basingstoke Town.

== Career ==
Winchcombe joined Swindon Town from Procision Football Academy in 2015, and went on to make his first-team debut in November 2021 during an EFL Trophy group-stage tie against Newport County, playing the full 90 minutes in the 1–0 victory.

On 25 March 2022, Winchcombe and team-mate Levi Francis joined National League South club Chippenham Town on work experience loans for the remainder of the 2021–22 campaign.

On 24 July 2022, Winchcombe signed for Isthmian League Premier South Central Division club Basingstoke Town.

== Career statistics ==
As of end of 2022–23 season

Appearances and goals by club, season and competition
Club	Season	League			FA Cup		League Cup		Other		Total	
Club	Season	Division	Apps	Goals	Apps	Goals	Apps	Goals	Apps	Goals	Apps	Goals
Swindon Town	2021–22	League Two	0	0	0	0	0	0	1 (Note: Appearance in the EFL Trophy)	0	1	0
Highworth Town (loan)	2021–22	Southern League Division One South	3	0	—		—		—		3	0
Chippenham Town (loan)	2021–22	National League South	1	0	—		—		—		1	0
Basingstoke Town	2022–23	Isthmian League South Central Division	34	0	2	0	—		2 (Note: One appearance in the FA Trophy, one in the Alan Turvey Trophy)	0	38	0
Career total			38	0	2	0	0	0	3	0	43	0

== Honours ==
Basingstoke Town

- Isthmian League South Central Division: 2022–23
