= Jojo Wollacott =

Ghanaian footballer (born 1996)

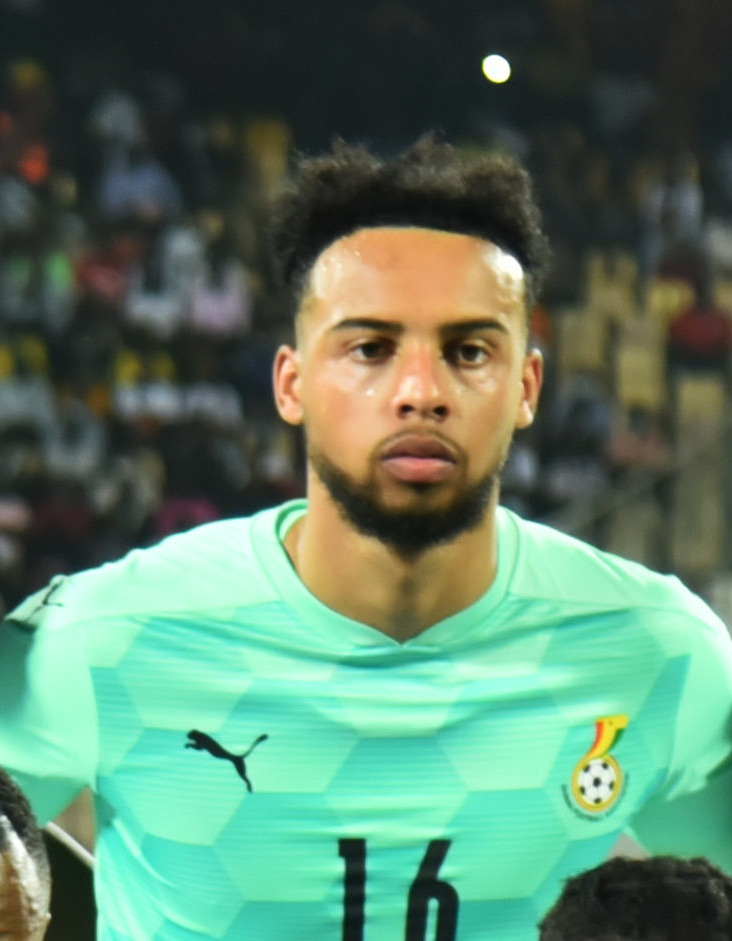
- Wollacott playing for Ghana in 2022.

Personal information
- Full name: Joseph Luke Wollacott
- Date of birth: 8 September 1996 (age 30)
- Place of birth: Bristol, England
- Height: 1.90 m (6 ft 3 in)
- Position: Goalkeeper

Youth career
- 2009–2015: Bristol City

Senior career*
Years	Team	Apps	(Gls)
2013–2021	Bristol City	0	(0)
2015	→ Clevedon Town (loan)	1	(0)
2015	→ Weymouth (loan)	4	(0)
2016	→ Bergsøy (loan)	13	(0)
2017	→ Bath City (loan)	0	(0)
2017–2018	→ Woking (loan)	1	(0)
2018	→ Truro City (loan)	2	(0)
2018	→ Truro City (loan)	10	(0)
2018–2019	→ Gloucester City (loan)	13	(0)
2019–2020	→ Forest Green Rovers (loan)	10	(0)
2021	→ Swindon Town (loan)	2	(0)
2021–2022	Swindon Town	37	(0)
2022–2023	Charlton Athletic	16	(0)
2023–2024	Hibernian	7	(0)
2024–2026	Crawley Town	42	(0)
2026–	FC Košice		

International career^{‡}
2021–2024	Ghana	12	(0)
- * Club domestic league appearances and goals as of 17:10, 4 August 2026 (UTC) ‡ National team caps and goals as of 17:10, 4 August 2026 (UTC)

Joseph Luke Wollacott (born 8 September 1996) is a professional footballer who plays as a goalkeeper for Niké liga club FC Košice. Born in England, he plays for the Ghana national team.

== Early and personal life ==
Born in Bristol to a Ghanaian mother, Wollacott grew up in the Lockleaze area of the city before moving cross-city in 2008.

== Club career ==
=== Bristol City ===
Wollacott started his career in the Bristol City youth academy, joining the academy aged 13. He had early loan spells with non-league clubs Clevedon Town and Weymouth, and Norwegian club Bergsøy.

In August 2017, Wollacott signed a new two-year deal with the option for a further year, and joined National League South club Bath City on a season-long loan, but returned to Bristol City on 23 October. On 8 December 2017, Wollacott joined National League club Woking on a month-long loan; he made two appearances for the club. Later that season, he joined Truro City on an emergency loan on 24 April, making two appearances as Truro finished in the National League South play-offs, and also started their 3–1 play-off quarter-final defeat to Hampton & Richmond Borough.

In July 2018, it was announced that Wollacott would return to Truro on a short-term loan. On 29 November 2018, Wollacott joined Gloucester City on a three-month loan deal. He saved a penalty on his debut for the club as Gloucester lost 2–0 to Chelmsford City on his debut. He was recalled from his loan at Gloucester in March 2019 following an injury to Bristol City goalkeeper Niki Maenpaa.

Wollacott signed a new two-year contract with the option for a one-year extension in summer 2019. On 7 August 2019, he joined EFL League Two side Forest Green Rovers on loan for the 2019–20 season, facing competition for the first-team spot from Adam Smith and Lewis Thomas. He made his debut in professional football six days later, saving a penalty as he kept a clean sheet in a 0–0 draw with Charlton Athletic in the EFL Cup, before going on to finish on the winning side in the penalty shoot-out. Wollacott was recalled from his loan on 6 January 2020.

=== Swindon Town ===
On 12 February 2021, Wollacott joined League One side Swindon Town on a seven-day emergency loan deal.

In June 2021, Wollacott signed for Swindon Town on a one-year contract, with Bristol City holding a sell-on clause on Wollacott as part of the deal.

=== Charlton Athletic ===
On 23 June 2022, Wollacott joined Charlton Athletic on a three-year contract following the expiry of his contract at Swindon Town.

=== Hibernian ===
Wollacott moved to Scottish club Hibernian on 23 June 2023 for an undisclosed fee, signing a three-year contract. He made his first appearance for Hibs in a Europa Conference League tie against Andorran side Inter Club d'Escaldes on 3 August, but during that match he suffered a thigh injury that meant he had to be substituted.

=== Crawley Town ===
On 18 July 2024, Wollacott returned to England, joining newly promoted League One side Crawley Town on a two-year deal. He made his debut for the club in their opening League One match of the season, a 2–1 win at home to Blackpool on 10 August, with Blackpool scoring after Wollacott's attempted long ball struck the legs of forward Ashley Fletcher. He was released at the end of the 2025–26 season.

=== FC Košice ===
On 8 October 2026, Wollacott signed for Slovak First Football League club FC Košice on a short-term contract.

== International career ==
In October 2021, Wollacott received his first call-up to the Ghana national team for 2022 World Cup qualification game against Zimbabwe. He debuted with them in a 3–1 2022 FIFA World Cup qualification win over Zimbabwe on 9 October 2021. He was part of the Ghanaian team in the 2021 Africa Cup of Nations that was eliminated at the group stage of the competition.

Wollacott missed out on inclusion in Ghana's squad for the 2022 FIFA World Cup after suffering a finger injury prior to the tournament.

== Career statistics ==
As of match played 9 December 2025

Appearances and goals by club, season and competition
Club	Season	League			FA Cup		League Cup		Other		Total	
Club	Season	Division	Apps	Goals	Apps	Goals	Apps	Goals	Apps	Goals	Apps	Goals
Bristol City	2013–14	League One	0	0	0	0	0	0	0	0	0	0
Bristol City	2014–15	League One	0	0	0	0	0	0	0	0	0	0
Bristol City	2015–16	Championship	0	0	0	0	0	0	—		0	0
Bristol City	2016–17	Championship	0	0	0	0	0	0	—		0	0
Bristol City	2017–18	Championship	0	0	0	0	0	0	—		0	0
Bristol City	2018–19	Championship	0	0	0	0	0	0	—		0	0
Bristol City	2019–20	Championship	0	0	—		—		—		0	0
Bristol City	2020–21	Championship	0	0	0	0	0	0	—		0	0
Bristol City	Total		0	0	0	0	0	0	0	0	0	0
Clevedon Town (loan)	2013–14	SL Division One South & West	1	0	0	0	—		2 (Note: One appearance in the FA Trophy, one appearance in the Southern League Cup)	0	3	0
Weymouth (loan)	2014–15	SL Premier Division	4	0	0	0	—		0	0	4	0
Bergsøy (loan)	2016	3. divisjon	13	0	0	0	—		0	0	13	0
Bath City (loan)	2017–18	National League South	0	0	1	0	—		1 (Note: One appearance in the Somerset Premier Cup)	0	2	0
Woking (loan)	2017–18	National League	1	0	0	0	—		1 (Note: One appearance in the FA Trophy)	0	2	0
Truro City (loan)	2017–18	National League South	2	0	0	0	—		1 (Note: One appearance in the National League South play-offs)	0	3	0
Truro City (loan)	2018–19	National League South	10	0	0	0	—		0	0	10	0
Truro City (loan)	Total		12	0	0	0	—		1	0	13	0
Gloucester City (loan)	2018–19	National League South	13	0	0	0	—		0	0	13	0
Forest Green Rovers (loan)	2019–20	League Two	10	0	2	0	2	0	1 (Note: One appearance in the EFL Trophy)	0	15	0
Swindon Town (loan)	2020–21	League One	2	0	0	0	0	0	0	0	2	0
Swindon Town	2021–22	League Two	37	0	2	0	0	0	0	0	39	0
Swindon Town	Total		39	0	2	0	0	0	0	0	41	0
Charlton Athletic	2022–23	League One	16	0	1	0	3	0	0	0	20	0
Hibernian	2023–24	Scottish Premiership	7	0	0	0	0	0	1 (Note: One appearance in the Europa Conference League)	0	8	0
Crawley Town	2024–25	League One	33	0	1	0	2	0	0	0	36	0
Crawley Town	2025–26	League Two	9	0	1	0	0	0	2 (Note: Two appearances in the EFL Trophy)	0	12	0
Crawley Town	Total		42	0	2	0	2	0	2	0	48	0
Career total			158	0	8	0	7	0	9	0	182	0

=== International ===
As of match played on 26 March 2024

Appearances and goals by national team and year
National team	Year	Apps	Goals
Ghana	2021	4	0
Ghana	2022	7	0
Ghana	2023	0	0
Ghana	2024	1	0
Total		12	0

== Honours ==
Individual

- EFL League Two Team of the Season: 2021–22
