= Mo Dabre =

Italian footballer

Personal information
- Full name: Mohammad Dabre
- Date of birth: 22 January 2003 (age 23)
- Place of birth: Lecco, Italy
- Position: Midfielder

Team information
- Current team: Salisbury
- Number: 7

Youth career
- Lecco
- –2021: Volenti Academy

Senior career*
Years	Team	Apps	(Gls)
2021–2023	Swindon Town	0	(0)
2022	→ Chippenham Town (loan)	11	(1)
2022	→ Banbury United (loan)	0	(0)
2022	→ Worthing (loan)	4	(2)
2023	→ Worthing (loan)	14	(3)
2023	Chelmsford City	8	(0)
2023–2025	Tonbridge Angels	50	(2)
2025–2026	Sutton United	6	(0)
2025–2026	→ Salisbury (loan)	8	(0)
2026–	Salisbury	16	(0)
- * Club domestic league appearances and goals as of 13:15, 07 May 2026 (UTC)

Mohammad Dabre (born 22 January 2003) is an Italian footballer who plays as a midfielder for National League South club Salisbury.

== Career ==
Dabre played at youth level for Lecco before moving to England. He then joined the Volenti Academy.

On 4 August 2021, Dabre signed for EFL side Swindon Town, and made his senior debut the following month in the EFL Trophy fixture against Arsenal U21. Dabre scored the opening goal in a 2–1 victory for Swindon.

Dabre moved on loan to Chippenham Town in February 2022. Other loan spells followed, firstly to Banbury United in September 2022 and then, in November 2022, to Worthing. In February 2023, he returned to Worthing on loan until the end of the season.

On 13 June 2023, National League South side Chelmsford City announced the signing of Dabre.

On 23 November 2023, Dabre signed for Tonbridge Angels.

On 26 May 2025, Dabre joined National League side Sutton United.

After a loan spell with Salisbury, Dabre signed permanently for the club in February 2026.

== Personal life ==
Born in Italy, Dabre is of Burkinabè descent.

== Career statistics ==
As of 19 April 2025

Appearances and goals by club, season and competition
Club	Season	League			FA Cup		League Cup		Other		Total	
Club	Season	Division	Apps	Goals	Apps	Goals	Apps	Goals	Apps	Goals	Apps	Goals
Swindon Town	2021–22	League Two	0	0	1	0	0	0	4 (Note: Appearance(s) in the EFL Trophy.)	1	5	1
Swindon Town	2022–23	League Two	0	0	0	0	1	0	2	0	3	0
Swindon Town	Total		0	0	1	0	1	0	6	1	8	1
Chippenham Town (loan)	2021–22	National League South	11	1	0	0	0	0	2 (Note: Appearance(s) in National League South play-offs)	0	13	1
Banbury United (loan)	2022–23	National League North	0	0	0	0	0	0	0	0	0	0
Worthing (loan)	2022–23	National League South	18	5	0	0	0	0	1 (Note: Appearance in the FA Trophy.)	0	19	5
Chelmsford City	2023–24	National League South	8	0	1	0	0	0	1	0	10	0
Tonbridge Angels	2023–24	National League South	23	2	0	0	0	0	0	0	23	2
Tonbridge Angels	2024–25	National League South	27	0	2	0	0	0	1	0	30	0
Tonbridge Angels	Total		50	2	2	0	0	0	1	0	53	2
Career total			87	8	4	0	1	0	11	1	103	9
