= Levi Francis =

English association football player

Personal information
- Full name: Levi Lloyd Francis
- Date of birth: 4 September 2003 (age 23)
- Position: Defender

Team information
- Current team: Slimbridge

Youth career
- –2021: Swindon Town

Senior career*
Years	Team	Apps	(Gls)
2021–2022	Swindon Town	0	(0)
2022	→ Highworth Town (loan)	5	(0)
2022	→ Chippenham Town (loan)	1	(0)
2022–	Slimbridge	30	(0)
- * Club domestic league appearances and goals as of 12:56, 11 May 2023 (UTC)

Levi Lloyd Francis (born 4 September 2003) is an English professional footballer who plays as a Attacker for Malvern Town.

== Career ==
Francis started his career with Swindon Town, making his first-team debut during an EFL Trophy second round tie in November 2021 against Colchester United, featuring for 57 minutes in the 2–1 defeat which saw the Robins exit the competition.

On 25 March 2022, Francis along with team-mate, Callum Winchcombe joined National League South side, Chippenham Town on work experience loans for the remainder of the 2021–22 campaign.

On 9 July 2022, Francis joined Slimbridge.

== Career statistics ==
As of match played 22 April 2023

Appearances and goals by club, season and competition
Club	Season	League			FA Cup		League Cup		Other		Total	
Club	Season	Division	Apps	Goals	Apps	Goals	Apps	Goals	Apps	Goals	Apps	Goals
Swindon Town	2021–22	League Two	0	0	0	0	0	0	1 (Note: Appearance in the EFL Trophy)	0	1	0
Highworth Town (loan)	2021–22	Southern League Division One South	5	0	—		—		—		5	0
Chippenham Town (loan)	2021–22	National League South	1	0	—		—		—		1	0
Slimbridge	2022–23	Southern League Division One South	30	0	2	0	—		0	0	32	0
Career total			36	0	2	0	0	0	1	0	39	0
