= Jonny Williams =

Wales international footballer

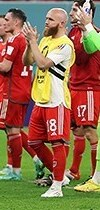
- Williams with Wales at the 2022 FIFA World Cup

Personal information
- Full name: Jonathan Peter Williams
- Date of birth: 9 October 1993 (age 33)
- Place of birth: Pembury, Kent, England
- Height: 5 ft 6 in (1.68 m)
- Position: Midfielder

Team information
- Current team: Eastleigh
- Number: 32

Youth career
- 2002–2011: Crystal Palace

Senior career*
Years	Team	Apps	(Gls)
2011–2019	Crystal Palace	55	(0)
2014	→ Ipswich Town (loan)	13	(1)
2014–2015	→ Ipswich Town (loan)	7	(1)
2015–2016	→ Nottingham Forest (loan)	10	(0)
2016	→ Milton Keynes Dons (loan)	13	(0)
2016	→ Ipswich Town (loan)	8	(0)
2017–2018	→ Sunderland (loan)	12	(1)
2019–2021	Charlton Athletic	60	(2)
2021	Cardiff City	9	(0)
2021–2023	Swindon Town	77	(15)
2023–2026	Gillingham	94	(2)
2026–	Eastleigh	0	(0)

International career^{‡}
2007–2009	Wales U17	15	(1)
2009	Wales U19	5	(0)
2010–2013	Wales U21	8	(1)
2013–2022	Wales	33	(2)
Medal record
Men's football
Representing Wales
UEFA European Championship
Bronze medal – third place	2016 France
- * Club domestic league appearances and goals as of 17:10, 2 May 2026 (UTC) ‡ National team caps and goals as of 19:10, 1 June 2022 (UTC)

Jonathan Peter Williams (born 9 October 1993) is a professional footballer who plays as a midfielder for National League club Eastleigh. He retired from international football for Wales in 2023.

Williams started his career at Crystal Palace, and whilst there had loan spells at Nottingham Forest, Milton Keynes Dons, Ipswich Town and Sunderland. He signed for Charlton Athletic on a permanent deal in January 2019 before moving to Cardiff City two years later in February 2021.

Affectionately known as "Joniesta", he was part of the Welsh squad that reached the semi-final stages of the 2016 European Championships.

== Club career ==
=== Crystal Palace ===
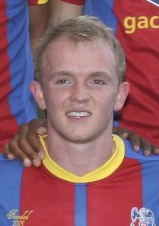
Williams with Crystal Palace, 2012

Williams made his breakthrough into the Crystal Palace first team at the beginning of the 2011–12 season, after much hype surrounding his performances for the academy and reserve side the previous term. He made his debut on 16 August 2011, coming on as a second-half substitute at home to Coventry City. One week later, Williams made his full first-team debut in the opening game of the 2011–12 League Cup, at home to Crawley Town. He played 85 minutes, making his first assist and received a standing ovation from the home crowd. He scored his first professional goal for Crystal Palace on 13 September 2011, in a match against Wigan Athletic in the League Cup.

Williams suffered a broken fibula in his right leg on 15 November 2011, whilst on Under-21 international duty with Wales. After missing four months with the injury, he returned to the starting line-up on 19 March 2012 at home to Hull City, playing 71 minutes. Williams made only a handful of appearances after his return from injury, with the coaching staff giving him time to rest and regain full fitness in time for the start of the next season. He ended the season having played in 18 first-team games. On 10 May, Williams signed a five-year contract to keep him at the club until 2017.

Williams played four pre-season games in preparation for the 2012–13 season having recovered from his broken leg. In the last game against Reading, he was taken off with a calf injury, forcing him to miss the first four games of the season. After he recovered from the injury he started against Preston North End in a League Cup tie, and then came on as a substitute on 1 September against Sheffield Wednesday, Palace's first win of the season. Williams' efforts after making a comeback from the injury were rewarded when he received Crystal Palace's Young Player of the Year award for the season.

During the 2013–14 season, Palace's first season back in the Premier League, Williams made nine league appearances, before going on loan at the start of 2014.

Williams made his only appearance of the 2015–16 Premier League season against Chelsea, coming on as a substitute for Lee Chung-yong.

He signed a contract extension with Crystal Palace in June 2017, keeping him at the club until 2019.

==== Ipswich Town (loans) ====
On 27 February 2014, it was confirmed by Crystal Palace chairman, Steve Parish, that Williams would be loaned to Ipswich Town initially for one month due to not being involved in the first team at Palace.

Williams returned to Ipswich on loan from 29 September 2014. Having suffered a groin injury in early November, Williams made only five appearances for Ipswich, scoring one goal, before his return to Palace at the beginning of January 2015 once the loan spell ended.

On the emergency loan deadline day in March 2015, Williams re-signed for a third spell at the Suffolk side (along with Zeki Fryers) until the end of the season. However, his groin injury again caused him to miss most of the loan, making just two appearances during this spell with the club.

==== Nottingham Forest (loan) ====
On 10 September 2015, Williams joined Nottingham Forest until 16 January 2016, but was recalled earlier on account of squad injuries.

==== Milton Keynes Dons (loan) ====
On 22 January 2016, Williams joined Milton Keynes Dons on a 93-day emergency loan from Crystal Palace.

==== Return to Ipswich Town (loan) ====
Williams rejoined Ipswich Town for a fourth loan spell on 31 August 2016, this time until the end of the 2016–17 season, making eight appearances.

==== Sunderland (loan) ====
On 31 August 2017, it was announced that Williams had signed on loan for Championship club Sunderland until the end of the 2017–18 season. He scored his first goal for Sunderland in a 3–3 draw with Middlesbrough on 24 February 2018. While at Sunderland he was filmed and interviewed for the documentary series Sunderland 'Til I Die, where it shows him recovering from injury, training and speaking to a sports psychologist about his confidence.

=== Charlton Athletic ===
On 4 January 2019, Williams joined Charlton Athletic on a contract until the end of the season. This ended his 17-year association with Crystal Palace. He made 16 appearances for the club for the rest of the season, helping the club to achieve promotion to the Championship, defeating former loan club Sunderland in the play-off final.

Despite this he was released by Charlton at the end of the 2018–19 season. However, on 18 July 2019, Williams rejoined the club on a one-year deal, with the option of an additional 12 months. In October 2019 he underwent knee surgery. He scored his first goal for Charlton in a 2–0 win over Portsmouth on 31 October 2020.

=== Cardiff City ===
On 1 February 2021, Williams joined Cardiff City for an undisclosed fee. This reunited him with former manager Mick McCarthy. Williams made his Cardiff debut as a second-half substitute in a 4–0 victory over Derby County on 2 March 2021.

=== Swindon Town ===
Williams joined Swindon Town on 13 August 2021 on a free transfer signing a two-year contract. He was released by Swindon at the end of the 2022–23 season. This came after a season in which, Williams was the club's top scorer and also nominated for their Player of the Season award. In his time with the Robins, Williams made 77 league appearances for the club, scored 15 goals and provided seven assists.

=== Gillingham ===
On 14 June 2023, Williams joined Gillingham. Williams made 94 appearances across three seasons with the club. He was released at the end of his contract in May 2026.

=== Eastleigh ===
On 24 September 2026, Williams joined National League club Eastleigh on a deal until the end of the season.

== International career ==
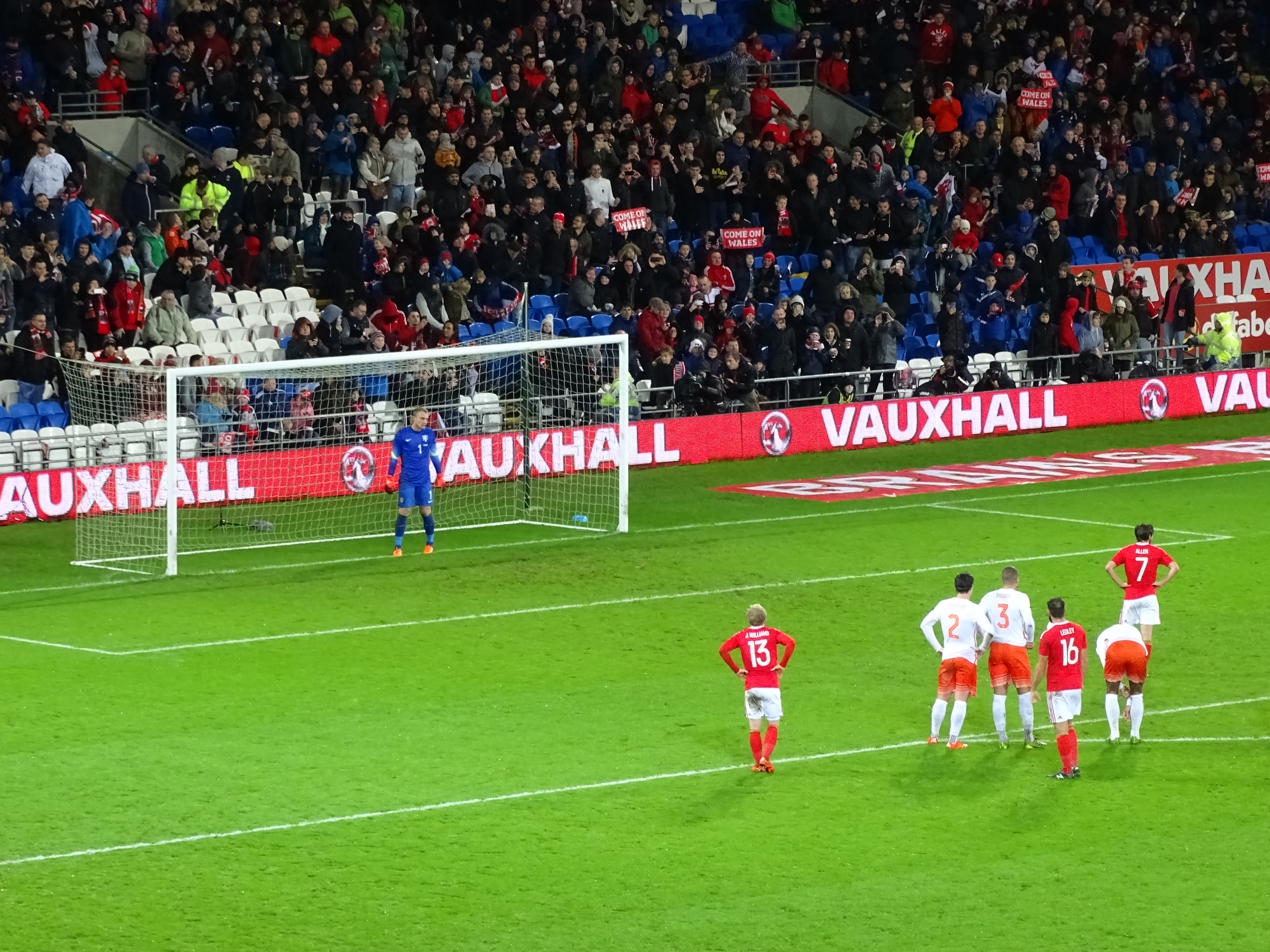
Williams (wearing No.13) watching a Welsh penalty kick against the Netherlands in 2015.

Williams qualifies for Wales as his father was born in Anglesey. He was the second youngest player to play for the Welsh under 21s, making his debut having just turned 17. Williams was called up to the senior Wales squad on 3 October 2011, by then manager Gary Speed, following injuries to three players for the matches against Switzerland and Bulgaria. On 15 November 2011, Williams suffered a broken fibula in his right leg whilst on U21 International duty with Wales.

On 29 August 2012, Williams was again called up to the Wales senior squad by manager Chris Coleman for the World Cup qualifiers against Belgium and Serbia. In January 2013, he was selected in the Wales under-21 squad for the friendly match against Iceland on 6 February 2013 and he scored in the 3–0 victory. On 22 March 2013, Williams made his international debut in a 2–1 victory over Scotland when he appeared as a substitute at half time in place of Gareth Bale. He made his first start for Wales four days later in a 2–1 defeat at home to Croatia.

Williams scored his first goal for Wales on his 25th appearance for the national side, scoring late to seal a 1–0 win over Bulgaria in October 2020.

In May 2021 he was selected for the Wales squad for the delayed UEFA Euro 2020 tournament. In November 2022 he was named in the Wales squad for the 2022 FIFA World Cup in Qatar.

Williams announced his international retirement in March 2023.

== Career statistics ==
=== Club ===
As of match played 2 May 2026

Appearances and goals by club, season and competition
Club	Season	League			FA Cup		League Cup		Other		Total	
Club	Season	Division	Apps	Goals	Apps	Goals	Apps	Goals	Apps	Goals	Apps	Goals
Crystal Palace	2011–12	Championship	14	0	0	0	4	1	—		18	1
Crystal Palace	2012–13	Championship	29	0	2	0	1	0	3 (Note: Appearances in Championship play-offs)	0	35	0
Crystal Palace	2013–14	Premier League	9	0	1	0	1	0	—		11	0
Crystal Palace	2014–15	Premier League	2	0	0	0	2	0	—		4	0
Crystal Palace	2015–16	Premier League	1	0	—		0	0	—		1	0
Crystal Palace	2018–19	Premier League	0	0	—		1	0	—		1	0
Crystal Palace	Total		55	0	3	0	9	1	3	0	70	1
Ipswich Town (loan)	2013–14	Championship	13	1	—		—		—		13	1
Ipswich Town (loan)	2014–15	Championship	7	1	—		—		0	0	7	1
Ipswich Town (loan)	Total		20	2	—		—		0	0	20	2
Nottingham Forest (loan)	2015–16	Championship	10	0	—		—		—		10	0
Milton Keynes Dons (loan)	2015–16	Championship	13	0	1	0	—		—		14	0
Ipswich Town (loan)	2016–17	Championship	8	0	—		—		—		8	0
Sunderland (loan)	2017–18	Championship	12	1	0	0	1	0	—		13	1
Charlton Athletic	2018–19	League One	16	0	—		—		2 (Note: Appearances in League One play-offs)	0	18	0
Charlton Athletic	2019–20	Championship	26	0	1	0	0	0	—		27	0
Charlton Athletic	2020–21	League One	18	2	1	0	1	0	1 (Note: Appearance in EFL Trophy)	0	21	2
Charlton Athletic	Total		60	2	2	0	1	0	3	0	66	2
Cardiff City	2020–21	Championship	9	0	—		—		—		9	0
Swindon Town	2021–22	League Two	40	5	3	0	0	0	2 (Note: Appearances in League Two play-offs)	0	45	5
Swindon Town	2022–23	League Two	37	10	1	0	1	0	0	0	39	10
Swindon Town	Total		77	15	4	0	1	0	2	0	84	15
Gillingham	2023–24	League Two	42	0	2	0	2	0	3 (Note: Appearance in EFL Trophy)	1	49	1
Gillingham	2024–25	League Two	26	1	0	0	1	0	3 (Note: Appearance in EFL Trophy)	0	30	1
Gillingham	2025–26	League Two	26	1	0	0	1	0	0	0	27	1
Gillingham	Total		94	2	2	0	4	0	6	1	106	3
Eastleigh	2026–27	National League	0	0	0	0	—		0	0	0	0
Career total			358	22	12	0	16	1	14	1	400	24

=== International ===
As of match played on 1 June 2022

Appearances and goals by national team and year
National team	Year	Apps	Goals
Wales	2013	4	0
Wales	2014	3	0
Wales	2015	2	0
Wales	2016	7	0
Wales	2017	1	0
Wales	2019	4	0
Wales	2020	4	1
Wales	2021	6	0
Wales	2022	2	1
Total		33	2

As of match played on 1 June 2022. Scores and results list Wales' goal tally first, score column indicates score after each Williams goal.

No.	Date	Venue	Opponent	Score	Result	Competition
1	14 October 2020	Vasil Levski National Stadium, Sofia, Bulgaria	Bulgaria	1–0	1–0	2020–21 UEFA Nations League B
2	1 June 2022	Stadion Wrocław, Wrocław, Poland	Poland	1–0	1–2	2022–23 UEFA Nations League A

== Honours ==
Crystal Palace

- Football League Championship play-offs: 2013

Charlton Athletic

- EFL League One play-offs: 2019

Individual

- Crystal Palace Young Player of the Season: 2012–13
- Ipswich Town Goal of the Season: 2013–14
