= Harry McKirdy =

English footballer (born 1997)

Personal information
- Full name: Harry McKirdy
- Date of birth: 29 March 1997 (age 29)
- Place of birth: London, England
- Height: 5 ft 9 in (1.75 m)
- Position: Forward

Youth career
- 2004–2011: Stoke City
- 2011–2016: Aston Villa

Senior career*
Years	Team	Apps	(Gls)
2016–2019	Aston Villa	0	(0)
2016–2017	→ Stevenage (loan)	11	(1)
2018	→ Crewe Alexandra (loan)	16	(3)
2019	→ Newport County (loan)	12	(1)
2019–2020	Carlisle United	28	(5)
2020–2021	Port Vale	8	(0)
2021–2022	Swindon Town	40	(22)
2022–2025	Hibernian	30	(0)
2024	→ Swindon Town (loan)	9	(1)
2025	Bromley	9	(2)
2025–2026	Crawley Town	32	(8)
Total		195	(43)
- * Club domestic league appearances and goals

Harry McKirdy (born 29 March 1997) is an English former professional footballer who played as a forward.

McKirdy is a product of the Aston Villa and Stoke City academies. While in Aston Villa's academy, he played on loan at English Football League sides Stevenage, Crewe Alexandra and Newport County. He played for Carlisle United permanently during the 2019–20 season and then signed with Port Vale in September 2020, though he would only stay there for one season. He joined Swindon Town in August 2021 on a one-year contract. He was named in the EFL League Two Team of the Season and Swindon Town's Player of the Season for the 2021–22 campaign. He signed with Scottish Premiership club Hibernian in September 2022 and returned to Swindon Town on loan in February 2024 after recovering from a health scare. He signed with Bromley for a short stay in February 2025 and moved on to Crawley Town three months later. He retired in October 2026, having scored 56 goals in 225 league and cup appearances.

== Career ==
=== Aston Villa ===
McKirdy was born in London and brought up in the Stoke-on-Trent area, where he attended St Joseph's College. He was on the books of Stoke City from the age of seven to 14, and then joined Aston Villa's academy. He signed a scholarship in 2013, and went on to sign a two-year professional contract with the "Villans" in 2016. He scored six goals in the 2016 HKFC Soccer Sevens tournament to win the golden boot, with one of his goals coming in the final as Villa beat West Ham United 2–0 to claim their sixth tournament title. He achieved this despite having only recently returned to fitness following a five-month lay-off with injury.

McKirdy trained with the first-team in 2016–17 pre-season, and joined League Two club Stevenage on 31 August 2016, on loan until January 2017. He made his senior debut for "Boro" on 24 September, coming on as a substitute in a 2–0 defeat to Exeter City at Broadhall Way. He scored his first career goal in an EFL Trophy tie against Brighton & Hove Albion U23 on 4 October. He marked his first league start with the winning goal in a 2–1 victory at Mansfield Town on 29 October. Head coach Darren Sarll said that "it was a terrific finish, the temperament of the lad to go through on his debut and finish like that, top drawer, the lad's going to be a good player".

In October 2017, McKirdy signed a contract extension to keep him at Villa Park until 2019. On 19 January 2018, he signed for Crewe Alexandra on loan to the end of the 2017–18 season. He scored on his debut after coming on as a second-half substitute in a 3–2 defeat to Wycombe Wanderers at Gresty Road on 20 January. Manager David Artell revealed that: "He even said that if money was an issue then he would look to pay his own way. That made me smile. That shows a real desire and hunger to come out on loan and play some football." McKirdy had been keen on the loan move with the "Railwaymen" and had consulted with Ashley Westwood and Steve Bruce before making up his mind. He scored three goals in 16 League Two games at Crewe Alex.

On 31 January 2019, McKirdy joined League Two side Newport County on loan until the end of the 2018–19 season. He made his debut for the "Exiles" on 19 February as a second-half substitute in a 4–1 win at Notts County. He scored his first goal for Newport on 13 April in a 3–0 win against Cambridge United. He was part of the team that reached the League Two play-off final at Wembley Stadium on 25 May, although he was an unused substitute in the final, which ended in a 1–0 defeat to Tranmere Rovers. He was used primarily as a substitute by manager Michael Flynn, making 11 substitute appearances and only two starts during his time at Rodney Parade, scoring one goal. McKirdy was released by Aston Villa in May 2019.

=== Carlisle United ===
McKirdy signed a one-year deal with League Two club Carlisle United on 11 June 2019. He scored a headed goal six minutes into his debut for the "Cumbrians", in a 2–1 win over Crawley Town on 3 August. Manager Steven Pressley said after the game that "I'm pleased for him because he's a really good kid. He takes a bit of managing, but he's a good kid underneath that". McKirdy scored 11 goals from 38 games to finish as United's top-scorer for the 2019–20 season. However, he was released in May 2020. Manager Chris Beech said that "I respect the skill sets he has got... [but] Harry wasn't happy... [and] I don't want to get a footballer in a headlock and make him do something he doesn't want to do".

=== Port Vale ===
McKirdy signed a one-year contract with League Two side Port Vale on 11 September 2020 after impressing manager John Askey on trial. He scored his first goal for the "Valiants" on 10 November, in a 4–2 win over Liverpool U21 at Vale Park in the group stages of the EFL Trophy. He failed to establish himself in the first-team however, and was transfer-listed in December. Interim manager Danny Pugh deselected him from the club's 22-man squad the following month. McKirdy played for Leicester City U23's in February. New Vale manager Darrell Clarke went on to state his regret at being unable to play McKirdy in the second half of the 2020–21 season and that he was still working to improve the player's mindset to prevent McKirdy's confidence from hindering his relationship with his coaches. On 31 March, the club gained special dispensation from the EFL to register McKirdy back on the 22-man squad, in place of the injured Zak Mills. Nevertheless, he was one of 15 players released from the club in May 2021.

=== Swindon Town ===
McKirdy scored twice in a pre-season friendly for Swindon Town in July 2021 and signed a one-year deal with the League Two club on 4 August; Ben Chorley, the "Robins" director of football said that "his attitude in both training and across all three preseason games has been fantastic". He scored on his League Two debut for the "Robins", a 3–1 win at Scunthorpe United on the opening day of the 2021–22 season. On New Year's Day, McKirdy scored four of Swindon's goals in their 5–2 win over Northampton Town at the County Ground. In his post-match interview he reflected that "I just felt a little bit livelier out there... I need to try and get to a place where I'm like that every week." On 7 January, he scored against Premier League champions Manchester City in a 4–1 home defeat in the FA Cup third round. On 13 January, he extended his contract with the club beyond the end of the season. He was named in the League Two Team of the Season at the EFL Awards for the 2021–22 season, and later Swindon Town's Player of the Season at the club's annual awards ceremony. He scored two goals in the play-off semi-final first leg victory over former club Port Vale, however, missed his penalty kick in the penalty shoot-out defeat at the end of the second leg.

He was sent off in the second game of the 2022–23 season, after being shown two yellow cards during a 0–0 draw with Salford City. He was reported to have subsequently gone into the referee's room and thrown a protein shake onto the referee's suit, leading to him being charged by The Football Association and being handed a three-match suspension and £1,500 fine after he admitted to "aggressive and improper" behaviour.

=== Hibernian ===
On 1 September 2022, McKirdy signed a three-year contract with Scottish Premiership club Hibernian after being bought for an undisclosed fee. The deal between Hibernian and Swindon came close to collapsing, but was rushed through on the final day of the transfer window as Hibernian manager Lee Johnson was short of attacking options having already allowed Christian Doidge to leave on loan. However, McKirdy hinted that he would like to return to Swindon the following month. In May 2023, he was reportedly facing disciplinary action after posting a complaint on Instagram over his time on the substitutes bench; the Gareth Bale-inspired post read "Chels. Nina. Golf. Hibs", referencing his support for Chelsea, his partner Nina, his love of golf and low priority for Hibernian.

In July 2023, routine scans revealed a medical issue that required cardiac surgery, ruling him out of action for up to six months. Manager Nick Montgomery said that "he's a great kid and this will build resilience for him". On 1 February 2024, he rejoined Swindon Town on loan until the end of the 2023–24 season. He started one game and made eight substitute appearances during his loan spell, scoring one goal. He departed Hibernian by mutual consent on 2 February 2025 as head coach David Gray praised his work to return to fitness but stated the club had plenty of attacking options.

=== Bromley ===
On 4 February 2025, McKirdy joined League Two side Bromley. He scored two goals from two starts and seven substitute appearances in the remainder of the 2024–25 season before being released upon the expiry of his contract.

=== Crawley Town ===
On 2 June 2025, McKirdy agreed to join League Two side Crawley Town on a one-year deal after having worked with manager Scott Lindsey at the end of his time with Swindon. Lindsey said that he was "a signing that we really wanted and worked hard to get". McKirdy was named in the League Two Team of the Week after scoring both goals in a 2–0 win over Cheltenham Town at the Broadfield Stadium on 13 September. He was sent off after picking up two yellow cards in a 1–0 loss at Shrewsbury Town on 18 October. He scored a brace in a 2–0 win over former club Newport County on 3 April. He scored eight goals in 33 games throughout the 2025–26 season, and said it felt strange to celebrate being the 22nd best team in League Two. He was then informed he would be released at the end of his contract following a "37-second phone call". He was part of the 45-man Professional Footballers' Association (PFA) free agent squad in July 2026. He announced his retirement from football three months later.

== Style of play ==
McKirdy is a versatile attacker, able to play in any forward position, either centrally or out wide. Crewe boss David Artell called McKirdy "a natural goalscorer" and "one of those nuisance forwards, who gets under the feet of centre-halves". He has been criticised for his temperament, particularly in regards to his reactions to jeering by fans both on the pitch and on social media.

== Career statistics ==
Appearances and goals by club, season and competition
Club	Season	League			National cup (Note: Includes FA Cup, Scottish Cup)		League cup (Note: Includes EFL Cup, Scottish League Cup)		Other		Total	
Club	Season	Division	Apps	Goals	Apps	Goals	Apps	Goals	Apps	Goals	Apps	Goals
Aston Villa	2016–17	Championship	0	0	0	0	0	0	—		0	0
Aston Villa	2017–18	Championship	0	0	0	0	0	0	0	0	0	0
Aston Villa	2018–19	Championship	0	0	0	0	0	0	0	0	0	0
Aston Villa	Total		0	0	0	0	0	0	0	0	0	0
Stevenage (loan)	2016–17	League Two	11	1	1	0	0	0	1 (Note: Appearance(s) in Football League Trophy)	1	13	2
Crewe Alexandra (loan)	2017–18	League Two	16	3	—		—		—		16	3
Newport County (loan)	2018–19	League Two	12	1	—		—		1 (Note: Appearance(s) in play-offs)	0	13	1
Carlisle United	2019–20	League Two	28	5	5	5	2	1	3	0	38	11
Port Vale	2020–21	League Two	8	0	1	0	1	0	2	2	12	2
Swindon Town	2021–22	League Two	35	20	3	1	1	0	5 (Note: Three appearances and one goal in the EFL Trophy and two appearances and two goals in League Two Play-Offs)	3	44	24
Swindon Town	2022–23	League Two	5	2	—		0	0	0	0	5	2
Swindon Town	Total		40	22	3	1	1	0	5	3	49	26
Hibernian	2022–23	Scottish Premiership	22	0	1	0	0	0	—		23	0
Hibernian	2023–24	Scottish Premiership	2	0	1	0	0	0	0	0	3	0
Hibernian	2024–25	Scottish Premiership	6	0	0	0	1	0	—		7	0
Hibernian	Total		30	0	2	0	1	0	0	0	33	0
Swindon Town (loan)	2023–24	League Two	9	1	—		—		—		9	1
Bromley	2024–25	League Two	9	2	—		—		—		9	2
Crawley Town	2025–26	League Two	32	8	1	0	0	0	0	0	33	8
Career total			195	43	13	6	5	1	12	6	225	56

== Honours ==
Individual

- EFL League Two Team of the Season: 2021–22
- Swindon Town Player of the Season: 2021–22
