= Ben Garner =

English football manager

Personal information
- Full name: Ben Garner
- Date of birth: 19 May 1980 (age 46)
- Place of birth: Pembury, Kent, England

Team information
- Current team: Southampton (assistant head coach)

Managerial career
- Years: Team
- 2019–2020: Bristol Rovers
- 2021–2022: Swindon Town
- 2022: Charlton Athletic
- 2023: Colchester United

Ben Garner (born 19 May 1980) is an English professional football coach who is assistant head coach of EFL Championship club Southampton.

Garner started his career as a youth coach at Crystal Palace's academy before being promoted to first team coach.

Having been at the club for over a decade, he then went onto to become assistant head coach at West Bromwich Albion before being appointed to a similar role at Indian Super League club ATK.

Garner made his first step into senior management at Bristol Rovers before later being appointed manager of Swindon Town. Despite working under an embargo, Garner led the club to a play-off semi-final.

He was then appointed manager of Charlton Athletic but departed the club that same season. Garner was then appointed as head coach of Colchester United in March 2023.

== Career ==
=== Crystal Palace ===
Garner started his professional coaching career at Crystal Palace in 2004 and spent the first seven years of his time at Selhurst Park as a youth coach within the club's academy.

Initially appointed as head coach of the under-11 team, he progressed through the age groups to become head coach of the under-18s in addition to setting up a full-time school programme in 2011. The players he coached on this programme and in Crystal Palace's academy system included Wilfried Zaha, Victor Moses, Nathaniel Clyne, Jonny Williams and Aaron Wan-Bissaka.

He was later promoted to first-team coach in 2012 by manager Ian Holloway where he helped the side secure a play-off spot with a fifth-place finish. Crystal Palace went on to beat rivals Brighton & Hove Albion in the play-off semi-finals and then Watford in the final to earn promotion to the Premier League.

Garner remained in his role as first-team coach for the next two seasons working under managers Holloway, Tony Pulis, Neil Warnock and Alan Pardew.

Garner was part of the backroom team that helped Crystal Palace retain their Premier League status, for the first time in the club's history, the following season as the club finished in 11th position as manager Pulis was awarded the LMA Manager of the Year award.

Crystal Palace ended the next year one place higher in what proved to be Garner's final campaign as part of the backroom staff at Selhurst Park.

Garner left Crystal Palace on 7 July 2015 by mutual consent.

=== West Bromwich Albion ===
Garner was appointed first-team coach at West Bromwich Albion on 9 October 2015 and was reunited with Tony Pulis.

The club promoted Garner to assistant head coach less than a year later.

West Bromwich Albion finished the 2016–17 season in 10th position, although Garner departed at the end of the year.

Having been linked with several clubs for a role in senior management, Pulis stated that Garner had the potential to become a manager in the future.

=== ATK ===
Garner was appointed as assistant head coach under Steve Coppell for the rest of the season at Indian Super League club ATK in 2019.

He helped the team finish sixth in the league and reach the semi-finals of the AIFF Super Cup before departing at the end of the campaign following the expiration of his contract.

=== Bristol Rovers ===
Garner made his first step into senior management when he was appointed head coach of Bristol Rovers on 23 December 2019.

Following a break in the football calendar during the COVID-19 pandemic and having to manage his new side in accordance with social distancing, Garner was later named Manager of the Week by the EFL and the Football League paper following a 2–1 victory away at Lincoln City on 10 October 2020.

Garner was relieved of his duties at the club on 14 November 2020.

=== Swindon Town ===
Garner was appointed head coach of Swindon Town by new owner Clem Morfuni on 21 July 2021.

The club was under a transfer embargo at the time of Garner's appointment and only had seven players available in the senior squad when he joined as manager.

In a campaign where he handed 13 players their professional debuts and reached the third round of the FA Cup for the first time in a decade, Garner got the club into the play-offs with a sixth-place finish to become the first manager to record such a feat while working under an embargo.

Despite winning the first leg of a play-off semi-final against Port Vale 2–1, Garner's side lost the away leg 1–0 before being defeated 6–5 in a penalty shootout.

=== Charlton Athletic ===
Garner was appointed manager of Charlton Athletic on a three-year contract the following season.

Having been hired to implement a similar attacking, possession-based football as with Swindon Town, Garner recorded just three defeats in his opening 15 league matches for Charlton.

He went on to take The Addicks to the third round of the EFL Cup as the last London club in the competition having beaten Queens Park Rangers, Walsall and Stevenage during a run which later ended against Manchester United.

Garner was sacked on 5 December 2022 as the club then entered into a period of exclusivity ahead of a potential takeover.

=== Colchester United ===
On 2 March 2023, Garner was appointed as the head coach of Colchester United. He was relieved of duties on 21 October 2023 after defeat at home to Harrogate Town concluded a run of four consecutive league defeats.

=== Right to Dream ===
In August 2024, Garner was appointed head coach of the Right to Dream International Academy.

=== Southampton ===
On 4 January 2026, Garner was appointed assistant coach of Southampton.

== Style of management ==
Garner began coaching at a young age following a serious injury.

While completing his UEFA Pro Licence in 2014, Garner gained experience and insight from manager José Mourinho at Chelsea, and also credits Terry Venables as someone who "stood out from anything I had experienced previously."

Garner has a reputation for playing attacking, possession-based football and developing young players.

A number of figures throughout the game have spoken highly of Garner with Crystal Palace chairman Steve Parish and former England international Rickie Lambert among those to have praised him.

== Managerial statistics ==
As of match played 21 October 2023

Managerial record by team and tenure
Team	From	To	Record				
Team	From	To	P	W	D	L	Win %
Bristol Rovers	23 December 2019	14 November 2020	36	9	10	17	25.00
Swindon Town	21 July 2021	8 June 2022	56	28	12	16	50.00
Charlton Athletic	8 June 2022	5 December 2022	29	9	12	8	31.03
Colchester United	2 March 2023	21 October 2023	27	7	7	13	25.93
Total			148	53	41	54	35.81
