= 2021–22 Accrington Stanley F.C. season =

Accrington Stanley
2021–22 season
- Owner: Andy Holt
- Manager: John Coleman
- Stadium: Crown Ground
- League One: 12th
- FA Cup: First round
- EFL Cup: Second round
- EFL Trophy: Second round
- Top goalscorer: League: Colby Bishop (12); All: Colby Bishop (15)

The 2021–22 season was Accrington Stanley's 53rd year in their history and fourth consecutive season in League One. Along with the league, the club also competed in the FA Cup, the EFL Cup and the EFL Trophy. The season covers the period from 1 July 2021 to 30 June 2022.

== Pre-season friendlies ==
Accrington Stanley announced they will play friendly matches against Clitheroe, Blackpool, Preston North End, Warrington Town and Bradford City as part of their pre-season preparations.

4 July 2021 Friendly	Clitheroe	0–3	Accrington Stanley	Clitheroe
15:00 BST			Charles 7'; Bishop 47'; Morgan 81'	Stadium: Shawbridge

17 July 2021 Friendly	Blackpool	1–3	Accrington Stanley	Squires Gate
TBA BST	Mitchell 35'	Report	Charles 33'; Pell 55'; Mumbongo 88'	Stadium: Squires Gate Training Ground; Attendance: 0 (Behind-closed-doors)

24 July 2021 Friendly	Accrington Stanley	1–1	Preston North End	Accrington
15:00 BST	Pritchard 65'	Report	Thomas 55'	Stadium: Wham Stadium

27 July 2021 Friendly	Warrington Town	0–2	Accrington Stanley	Warrington
19:30 BST			Mumbongo 2'; Trialist 15'	Stadium: Cantilever Park

31 July 2021 Friendly	Accrington Stanley	0–2	Bradford City	Accrington
15:00 BST		Report	Cook 4', 21'	Stadium: Wham Stadium

== Competitions ==
=== League One ===
==== League table ====
Pos	Team	Pld	W	D	L	GF	GA	GD	Pts
8	Oxford United	46	22	10	14	82	59	+23	76
9	Bolton Wanderers	46	21	10	15	74	57	+17	73
10	Portsmouth	46	20	13	13	68	51	+17	73
11	Ipswich Town	46	18	16	12	67	46	+21	70
12	Accrington Stanley	46	17	10	19	61	80	−19	61
13	Charlton Athletic	46	17	8	21	55	59	−4	59
14	Cambridge United	46	15	13	18	56	74	−18	58
15	Cheltenham Town	46	13	17	16	66	80	−14	56
16	Burton Albion	46	14	11	21	51	67	−16	53

Source: EFL Official Website
Rules for classification: 1) Points; 2) Goal difference; 3) Number of goals scored; 4) Head-to-head results; 5) Wins; 6) Away goals; 7) Penalty points based on yellow and red cards received excluding the last four games of the season (sec 9.5); 8) 12-point sending off offences; 9) If the tie affects the automatic promotion or relegation places, a play-off game or games would be held between the two tied teams

==== Results summary ====
Overall								Home						Away					
Pld	W	D	L	GF	GA	GD	Pts	W	D	L	GF	GA	GD	W	D	L	GF	GA	GD
46	17	10	19	61	80	−19	61	12	6	4	41	31	+10	5	4	15	20	49	−29

Last updated: 30 April 2022.

==== Results by matchday ====
Matchday	1	2	3	4	5	6	7	8	9	10	11	12	13	14	15	16	17	18	19	20	21	22	23	24	25	26	27	28	29	30	31	32	33	34	35	36	37	38	39	40	41	42	43	44	45	46
Ground	A	H	H	A	A	H	A	H	A	A	H	A	A	H	A	H	H	A	A	H	H	H	H	A	H	H	A	H	A	H	H	A	A	H	A	H	A	A	H	H	A	A	H	A	H	A
Result	L	W	W	W	L	W	L	L	D	L	W	L	W	D	D	L	L	L	W	W	L	W	W	D	D	D	L	D	L	W	W	L	L	W	L	W	D	L	L	D	L	W	D	L	W	W
Position	19	11	8	4	9	2	6	11	7	12	10	11	10	11	10	14	17	17	14	13	13	10	10	10	11	10	13	13	15	12	12	13	14	12	12	12	12	13	13	14	14	14	13	15	13	12

Updated to match(es) played on 30 April 2022. Source: Statto.com
A = Away; H = Home; W = Win; D = Draw; L = Loss

==== Matches ====
Stanley's fixtures were announced on 24 June 2021.

===== August =====
7 August 2021 1	Wycombe Wanderers	2–1	Accrington Stanley	High Wycombe
15:00 BST	McCleary 9', 15'	Report	Sykes (yellow card) 38'; Butcher 86'	Stadium: Adams Park; Attendance: 4,551; Referee: Charles Breakspear

14 August 2021 2	Accrington Stanley	2–1	Cambridge United	Accrington
15:00 BST	Butcher 14'; Pell (yellow card) 20', (goal) 30'; Pritchard (yellow card) 34'; Rodgers (yellow card) 81'	Report	Ironside 79'	Stadium: Wham Stadium; Attendance: 2,077; Referee: Ben Speedie

17 August 2021 3	Accrington Stanley	1–0	Doncaster Rovers	Accrington
19:45 BST	Dahlberg 3' (o.g.); Pell (yellow card) 23'; Butcher (yellow card) 62'; Sykes (yellow card) 90+3'	Report		Stadium: Wham Stadium; Attendance: 2,223; Referee: Scott Oldham

21 August 2021 4	Crewe Alexandra	0–1	Accrington Stanley	Crewe
15:00 BST	Offord (yellow card) 55' (yellow-red card) 89'; Murphy (yellow card) 56'; Ramsay (yellow card) 78'; Finney (yellow card) 86'	Report	Nottingham 17'; Sykes (yellow card) 38'; Pell (yellow card) 50'; Trafford (yellow card) 62'; Charles (yellow card) 68'; Bishop (yellow card) 90+7'; Mumbongo (yellow card) 90+7'	Stadium: Mornflake Stadium; Attendance: 4,187; Referee: Darren Drysdale

28 August 2021 5	Milton Keynes Dons	2–0	Accrington Stanley	Denbigh
15:00 BST	Eisa 45'; Darling (yellow card) 69'; Lewington (yellow card) 73'; Harvie (yellow card) 81'; O'Riley 85'; Boateng (yellow card) 87'	Report	Butcher (yellow card) 54'; Pell (yellow card) 60'	Stadium: Stadium MK; Attendance: 6,816; Referee: Declan Bourne

===== September =====
4 September 2021 6	Accrington Stanley	1–0	Shrewsbury Town	Accrington
15:00 BST	Mumbongo 15'; Morgan (yellow card) 65'	Report	Vela (yellow card) 25'; Pennington (yellow card) 44'; Cosgrove (yellow card) 45+2'; Nurse (yellow card) 62'	Stadium: Wham Stadium; Attendance: 2,465; Referee: Antony Coggins

11 September 2021 7	Sunderland	2–1	Accrington Stanley	Sunderland
15:00 BST	Neil 15'; Gooch (yellow card) 25'; Flanagan (yellow card) 50'; Winchester 58'; Embleton (yellow card) 78'; Pritchard (yellow card) 86'	Report	Pell (yellow card) 25'; Nottingham 30', (yellow card) 45+2'; Morgan (yellow card) 71'	Stadium: Stadium of Light; Referee: Anthony Backhouse

18 September 2021 8	Accrington Stanley	1–4	Wigan Athletic	Accrington
15:00 BST	Nottingham 53', (yellow card) 86'; Sykes (yellow card) 63'	Report	Whatmough 7'; Keane 18'; Power (yellow card) 40'; Lang (yellow card) 41'; Wyke 58', 90+4'	Stadium: Wham Stadium; Attendance: 4,517; Referee: Andy Haines

25 September 2021 9	Morecambe	3–3	Accrington Stanley	Morecambe
15:00 BST	Butcher 14'; Bishop 16' (pen.), 68'; McLoughlin (red card) 38'; Hamilton (yellow card) 39'	Report	Stockton 15', 81'; Gibson (yellow card) 19'; Phillips 27'	Stadium: Mazuma Stadium; Attendance: 4,142; Referee: Marc Edwards

28 September 2021 10	Oxford United	5–1	Accrington Stanley	Oxford
19:45 BST	Holland 18', 24'; Taylor 50'; Seddon (yellow card) 56'; Sykes 71'; Kane (yellow card) 79'; Moore (yellow card) 81'; Williams (yellow card) 90'; Nottingham 90+4' (o.g.)	Report	Sykes (yellow card) 45+3'; Hamilton 61'; McConville (yellow card) 81'	Stadium: The Kassam Stadium; Attendance: 5,654; Referee: Robert Lewis

===== October =====
2 October 2021 11	Accrington Stanley	2–1	Ipswich Town	Accrington
15:00 BST	Bishop 50'; Pell 79'; Hamilton (yellow card) 81'; Conneely (yellow card) 90'	Report	Bonne 38'; Norwood (yellow card) 90'	Stadium: Wham Stadium; Attendance: 2,600; Referee: Martin Coy

16 October 2021 12	Cheltenham Town	1–0	Accrington Stanley	Cheltenham
15:00 BST	Vassell 79'; Boyle (yellow card) 85'; Blair (yellow card) 89'	Report	Amankwah (yellow card) 71'	Stadium: Jonny-Rocks Stadium; Attendance: 3,437; Referee: James Oldham

19 October 2021 13	Charlton Athletic	2–3	Accrington Stanley	Charlton
19:45 GMT	Souaré (yellow card) 26'; Morgan (yellow card) 29'; Morgan 31' (o.g.); Clare (yellow card) 34'; Gunter (yellow card) 69'; Stockley 78'	Report	Pell 9', 57'; Hamilton 66'; Morgan (yellow card) 84'; Sherring (yellow card) 89'; Conneely (yellow card) 90+1'	Stadium: The Valley; Attendance: 11,813; Referee: Sam Allison

23 October 2021 14	Accrington Stanley	2–2	Portsmouth	Accrington
15:00 GMT	Sykes (yellow card) 45+3'; Pell 50'; Hamilton (yellow card) 64'; Butcher 77'	Report	Curtis 18' (yellow card) 64'; Raggett (yellow card) 28'; Harness 86'	Stadium: Wham Stadium; Attendance: 2,889

30 October 2021 15	Gillingham	0–0	Accrington Stanley	Gillingham
15:00 BST	Tucker (yellow card) 90+3'	Report	Sykes (yellow card) 62'; Morgan (yellow card) 84'	Stadium: Priestfield; Referee: Christopher Pollard

===== November =====
13 November 2021 16	Accrington Stanley	1–4	Plymouth Argyle	Accrington
15:00 GMT	Leigh 50', (yellow card) 54'; Conneely (yellow card) 72'	Report	Hamilton 23' (o.g.); Houghton 44'; Broom 63'; Hardie 76'; Garrick (yellow card) 79'; Grant (yellow card) 84'	Stadium: Wham Stadium; Attendance: 3,130; Referee: David Rock

20 November 2021 17	Accrington Stanley	2–3	Sheffield Wednesday	Accrington
15:00 GMT	Mansell 33'; Coyle (yellow card) 45'; Mumbongo 53'; O'Sullivan (yellow card) 90+5'	Report	Luongo (yellow card) 3'; Dunkley 13'; Corbeanu 20'; Kamberi 22'; Paterson (yellow card) 44'	Stadium: Wham Stadium; Attendance: 4,627; Referee: Paul Howard

23 November 2021 18	Burton Albion	4–0	Accrington Stanley	Burton upon Trent
19:45 GMT	Jebbison 28', 50'; Smith 45+4', 49'	Report	Coyle (yellow card) 66'; Mumbongo (yellow card) 82'	Stadium: Pirelli Stadium; Attendance: 1,946; Referee: Darren Drysdale

27 November 2021 19	Lincoln City	0–1	Accrington Stanley	Lincoln
15:15 GMT	Adelakun (yellow card) 77'	Report	Rodgers (yellow card) 17'; Coyle (yellow card) 23'; Bishop 55'; Sykes (yellow card) 90+4'	Stadium: LNER Stadium; Attendance: 8,547; Referee: Craig Hicks

===== December =====
4 December 2021 20	Accrington Stanley	5–1	Fleetwood Town	Accrington
15:00 GMT	Hamilton 29', (yellow card) 57', (goal) 90'; Bishop 46', 78'; Coyle 72'	Report	Batty (red card) 23'; Hayes (yellow card) 28'; Biggins 57'; Lane (yellow card) 74'	Stadium: Wham Stadium; Attendance: 1,901; Referee: Tom Nield

7 December 2021 21	Accrington Stanley	0–2	AFC Wimbledon	Accrington
19:45 GMT	Hamilton (yellow card) 45'; Nottingham (yellow card) 66'	Report	McCormick 59'; Assal 76'	Stadium: Wham Stadium; Attendance: 1,746; Referee: Simon Mather

11 December 2021 22	Accrington Stanley	1–0	Bolton Wanderers	Accrington
15:00 GMT	Leigh 20'; Amankwah (yellow card) 45'; Coyle (yellow card) 50'; Savin (yellow card) 63'	Report		Stadium: Wham Stadium; Attendance: 4,546; Referee: Alan Young

27 December 2021 23	Accrington Stanley	1–0	Rotherham United	Accrington
15:00 GMT	Coyle (yellow card) 31'; McConville 75'	Report	Smith (yellow card) 34'	Stadium: Wham Stadium; Attendance: 4,870; Referee: Andrew Kitchen

29 December 2021 24	Shrewsbury Town	0–0	Accrington Stanley	Shrewsbury
19:45 GMT	Pennington (yellow card) 59'; Bowman (yellow card) 84'	Report	Clark (yellow card) 73'; Sykes (yellow card) 84'	Stadium: Montgomery Waters Meadow; Attendance: 5,817; Referee: Neil Hair

===== January =====
8 January 2022 25	Accrington Stanley	1–1	Milton Keynes Dons	Accrington
15:00 GMT	Bishop 9'; Coyle (red card) 34'; Hamilton (yellow card) 90'	Report	Eisa 25'; Lewington (yellow card) 77'	Stadium: Wham Stadium; Attendance: 1,880; Referee: Will Finnie

15 January 2022 26	Accrington Stanley	1–1	Sunderland	Accrington
15:00 GMT	Sykes (yellow card) 58' (yellow-red card) 76'; Hamilton (yellow card) 82'; Clark 84'	Report	O'Brien 48'	Stadium: Wham Stadium; Attendance: 4,498; Referee: James Bell

22 January 2022 27	Ipswich Town	2–1	Accrington Stanley	Ipswich
15:00 GMT	Burns 23'; Carroll (yellow card) 52'; Chaplin 65'; Edmundson (yellow card) 87'; Celina (yellow card) 89'	Report	Nottingham (yellow card) 8'; Hamilton 15'; Pell (yellow card) 58'; Longelo (yellow card) 82'	Stadium: Portman Road; Attendance: 20,126; Referee: Geoff Eltringham

29 January 2022 28	Accrington Stanley	2–2	Morecambe	Accrington
15:00 GMT	Bishop 35'; Nottingham 45+4'; Rich-Baghuelou (yellow card) 85'; Butcher (yellow card) 88'	Report	Ayunga 14', 26'; Diagouraga (yellow card) 38'; Carson (yellow card) 74'	Stadium: Wham Stadium; Attendance: 3,527; Referee: Sam Purkiss

===== February =====
5 February 2022 29	Rotherham United	1–0	Accrington Stanley	Rotherham
15:00 GMT	Ferguson (yellow card) 20'; Rathbone (yellow card) 24'; Barlaser 57'; Smith (yellow card) 78'; Wood (red card) 87'	Report	Savin (yellow card) 45+1'; Rich-Baghuelou (yellow card) 50'; Hamilton (yellow card) 76'; Pell (penalty missed) 89'; McConville (yellow card) 90+4'	Stadium: AESSEAL New York Stadium; Attendance: 8,593; Referee: Andy Woolmer

8 February 2022 30	Accrington Stanley	2–0	Oxford United	Accrington
19:45 GMT	O'Sullivan 28'; Leigh (yellow card) 47'; Hamilton 90+1'	Report	Williams (yellow card) 49'; Brannagan (yellow card) 75'	Stadium: Wham Stadium; Attendance: 1,883; Referee: Martin Coy

12 February 2022 31	Accrington Stanley	4–1	Crewe Alexandra	Accrington
15:00 GMT	Sykes 12', 60', (yellow card) 90+4'; Butcher (yellow card) 29'; Leigh 51'; McConville 64'	Report	Agyei (yellow card) 16', (goal) 90+3'; Johnson (yellow card) 63'; Alebiosu (yellow card) 67'	Stadium: Wham Stadium; Attendance: 2,365; Referee: Sam Barrott

19 February 2022 32	Cambridge United	2–0	Accrington Stanley	Cambridge
15:00 GMT	Smith 66'; Hoolahan 90+5'	Report	Nottingham (yellow card) 90+3'	Stadium: Abbey Stadium; Attendance: 5,602; Referee: Lee Swabey

22 February 2022 33	Doncaster Rovers	2–0	Accrington Stanley	Doncaster
19:45 GMT	Martin 67'; Olowu 87'	Report	Clark (yellow card) 64'; Nottingham (yellow card) 66'	Stadium: Eco-Power Stadium; Attendance: 5,396; Referee: Andy Haines

26 February 2022 34	Accrington Stanley	3–2	Wycombe Wanderers	Accrington
15:00 GMT	Adedoyin 20'; Sykes 48', (yellow card) 80'; Pell 64'; Hamilton (yellow card) 90+5'; Clark (red card) 90+7'	Report	Vokes 13'; Kaikai 22'; Obita (yellow card) 36'; Gape (yellow card) 90'; McCarthy (yellow card) 90+5'	Stadium: Wham Stadium; Attendance: 2,242; Referee: Bobby Madley

===== March =====
5 March 2022 35	Portsmouth	4–0	Accrington Stanley	Milton
15:00 GMT	Robertson (yellow card) 2'; Hirst 16', 56'; Harness (red card) 21'; Raggett 28'; Romeo (yellow card) 38'; Tunnicliffe 69'	Report	Pell (yellow card) 47'; Nottingham (yellow card) 86'	Stadium: Fratton Park; Attendance: 15,051; Referee: Carl Brook

12 March 2022 36	Accrington Stanley	2–1	Charlton Athletic	Accrington
15:00 GMT	Coyle (yellow card) 22'; Longelo 28'; Leigh 32', (red card) 63'; Pell (yellow card) 38'; Adedoyin (yellow card) 38'	Report	Stockley 18' (pen.); Dobson (yellow card) 38'; Clare (yellow card) 40'; Washington (yellow card) 90'	Stadium: Wham Stadium; Attendance: 2,543; Referee: Simon Mather

15 March 2022 37	Sheffield Wednesday	1–1	Accrington Stanley	Owlerton
19:45 GMT	Hutchinson (yellow card) 64'; Paterson 66'	Report	Johnson 83' (o.g.)	Stadium: Hillsborough Stadium; Attendance: 20,688; Referee: Ross Joyce

19 March 2022 38	Plymouth Argyle	4–0	Accrington Stanley	Plymouth
15:00 GMT	Camará 12', (yellow card) 62'; Edwards 37'; Ennis 64'; Hardie 79'	Report	Butcher (yellow card) 31'; Savin (red card) 68'	Stadium: Home Park; Attendance: 13,076; Referee: Charles Breakspear

26 March 2022 39	Accrington Stanley	1–2	Gillingham	Accrington
15:00 GMT	Adedoyin (yellow card) 62'; Sykes (yellow card) 66'; Bishop 90+1' (pen.)	Report	Kelman 64'; Oliver 73'; Thompson (yellow card) 81'	Stadium: Wham Stadium; Attendance: 2,764; Referee: Scott Oldham

===== April =====
2 April 2022 40	Accrington Stanley	4–4	Cheltenham Town	Accrington
15:00 BST	Leigh 45+1', 48'; McConville 45+5'; Sykes (yellow card) 75' (yellow-red card) 90+1'; Coyle (yellow card) 79'; Chapman 87' (o.g.)	Report	May 33'; Boyle 66', 90+6', (yellow card) 90+7'; Wright 90'	Stadium: The Wham Stadium; Attendance: 2,181; Referee: Robert Lewis

5 April 2022 41	Wigan Athletic	3–0	Accrington Stanley	Wigan
19:45 BST	Bennett (yellow card) 33', (goal) 38'; Magennis 42'; Keane 58'; Naylor (yellow card) 77'	Report	Nottingham (yellow card) 36'; Rich-Baghuelou (yellow card) 53'	Stadium: DW Stadium; Referee: Anthony Backhouse

9 April 2022 42	Fleetwood Town	1–2	Accrington Stanley	Fleetwood
15:00 BST	Lane (yellow card) 39'; Harrison 45'; Cairns (red card) 85'	Report	Rodgers (yellow card) 33'; Rich-Baghuelou (yellow card) 45+3'; McConville 62'; Nottingham (yellow card) 77', (goal) 90+4'	Stadium: Highbury Stadium; Attendance: 2,881; Referee: Jeremy Simpson

15 April 2022 43	Accrington Stanley	0–0	Burton Albion	Accrington
15:00 BST	McConville (yellow card) 89'	Report	Oshilaja (yellow card) 39'; Mancienne (yellow card) 45+2'	Stadium: Wham Stadium; Attendance: 2,513; Referee: Ollie Yates

18 April 2022 44	Bolton Wanderers	3–1	Accrington Stanley	Horwich
15:00 BST	Afolayan (yellow card) 29', (goal) 42'; John (yellow card) 45+3'; Amaechi (yellow card) 65'; Böðvarsson 69', 89'; Williams (yellow card) 70'	Report	Clark (yellow card) 41'; McConville (yellow card) 45+3'; Rich-Baghuelou (yellow card) 45+5', (goal) 50'; Conneely (yellow card) 76'; Longelo (red card) 82'	Stadium: University of Bolton Stadium; Attendance: 19,098; Referee: Thomas Bramall

23 April 2022 45	Accrington Stanley	2–1	Lincoln City	Accrington
15:00 BST	Jackson 34' (o.g.); Bishop 59'; Savin (red card) 61'	Report	Whittaker (yellow card) 85'; Marquis (yellow card) 90'; Fiorini 90+3', (yellow card) 90+7'	Stadium: Wham Stadium; Attendance: 3,053; Referee: Marc Edwards

30 April 2022 46	AFC Wimbledon	3–4	Accrington Stanley	Wimbledon
12:30 BST	Assal 56'; Rudoni 58', 66'	Report	Rich-Baghuelou 18', (yellow card) 73'; Bishop 35'; Nottingham 45'; O'Sullivan 63'; Butcher (yellow card) 81'	Stadium: Plough Lane; Attendance: 7,839; Referee: David Rock

=== FA Cup ===
Accrington were drawn away to Port Vale in the first round.

6 November 2021 First round	Port Vale	5–1	Accrington Stanley	Burslem
15:00 GMT	Wilson 30', 73', 79'; Gibbons (yellow card) 36'; Jones (yellow card) 83'; Cass 85'; Lloyd 90+3'	Report	Bishop (red card) 70'; Conneely (yellow card) 79'; Hamilton 85'	Stadium: Vale Park; Attendance: 4,605; Referee: Ben Speedie

=== EFL Cup ===
Accrington Stanley were drawn away to Rotherham United in the first round and Oldham Athletic in the second round.

10 August 2021 First round	Rotherham United	1–2	Accrington Stanley	Rotherham
19:45 BST	Sadlier 76'; Edmonds-Green (yellow card) 84'	Report	Charles 38'; Pritchard (yellow card) 62'; Rodgers (yellow card) 63'; Bishop 86'; Savin (yellow card) 90+4'	Stadium: AESSEAL New York Stadium; Attendance: 3,131; Referee: Will Finnie

24 August 2021 Second round	Oldham Athletic	0–0 (5–4 p)	Accrington Stanley	Oldham
19:00 BST		Report	Nolan (yellow card) 88'; Procter (yellow card) 90+5'	Stadium: Boundary Park; Attendance: 2,362; Referee: Seb Stockbridge
	Penalties
	Hart (penalty scored); Keillor-Dunn (penalty scored); Bahamboula (penalty scored); Whelan (penalty scored); Adams (penalty missed); Luamba (penalty scored)		Sykes (penalty scored); Charles (penalty missed); Morgan (penalty scored); Savin (penalty scored); Leigh (penalty scored); Butcher (penalty missed)

=== EFL Trophy ===
Stanley were drawn into Northern Group G alongside Barrow, Leicester City U21 and Fleetwood Town.

Pos	Div	Team	Pld	W	PW	PL	L	GF	GA	GD	Pts	Qualification
1	L1	Accrington Stanley	3	2	1	0	0	11	3	+8	8	Advance to Round 2
2	L1	Fleetwood Town	3	2	0	0	1	8	6	+2	6	Advance to Round 2
3	L2	Barrow	3	1	0	1	1	4	5	−1	4	
4	ACA	Leicester City U21	3	0	0	0	3	1	10	−9	0	

Source: EFL.com

31 August 2021 Group game 1	Accrington Stanley	2–2 (5–4 p)	Barrow	Accrington
19:45 BST	Bishop 32', 50'; Moonan (yellow card) 73'	Report	Arthur 48'; Banks 72' (pen.)	Stadium: Wham Stadium; Attendance: 930; Referee: Chris Sarginson
	Penalties
	Bishop (penalty scored); Nottingham (penalty scored); Leigh (penalty scored); Savin (penalty scored); Scully (penalty scored)		Banks (penalty scored); Williams (penalty scored); Zanzala (penalty scored); Brough (penalty scored); Gordon (penalty missed)

5 October 2021 Group game 2	Accrington Stanley	5–0	Leicester City U21	Accrington
19:45 BST	Leigh 24', (yellow card) 74'; Nottingham 32'; Nolan 51'; O'Sullivan 53'; Malcolm 62'	Report	McAteer (yellow card) 9'	Stadium: Wham Stadium; Attendance: 885; Referee: Peter Wright

9 November 2021 Group game 3	Fleetwood Town	1–4	Accrington Stanley	Fleetwood
19:45 GMT	Garner 37' (pen.)	Report	Pell 23'; Hamilton 42'; Leigh 50'; Scully (yellow card) 81'; Nottingham 86'	Stadium: Highbury Stadium; Attendance: 633; Referee: James Bell

30 November 2021 Second round	Accrington Stanley	1–1 (4–5 p)	Wigan Athletic	Accrington
19:45 GMT	Pell 18'; Sherring (yellow card) 51'; Nottingham (yellow card) 63'; Sykes (yellow card) 64'	Report	Humphrys 53'; Bayliss (yellow card) 90+5'	Stadium: Wham Stadium; Attendance: 1,131; Referee: Bobby Madley
	Penalties
	Savin (penalty scored); Bishop (penalty scored); Pell (penalty scored); Sykes (penalty scored); Hamilton (penalty missed)		Jones (penalty scored); Massey (penalty scored); Bayliss (penalty scored); Watts (penalty scored); Kerr (penalty scored)

== Transfers ==
=== Transfers in ===
Date	Position	Nationality	Name	From	Fee	Ref.
1 July 2021	RW	IRL	John O'Sullivan	(England) Morecambe	Free transfer	
1 July 2021	CM	ENG	Harry Pell	(England) Colchester United	Free transfer	
1 July 2021	CB	ENG	Archie Procter	(England) AFC Wimbledon	Undisclosed	
5 July 2021	CB	ENG	Matthew Carson	(England) Burnley	Free transfer	
5 July 2021	DM	NIR	Liam Coyle	(England) Liverpool	Free transfer	
5 July 2021	CM	ENG	Dylan Moonan	(England) Burnley	Free transfer	
8 July 2021	CF	ENG	Joe Hardy	(England) Liverpool	Free transfer	
9 July 2021	CM	ENG	Oliver Patrick	(England) Oldham Athletic	Free transfer	
9 July 2021	CM	ENG	Ben Pleavin	(England) Blackburn Rovers	Free transfer	
10 July 2021	MF	ENG	Tommy Leigh	(England) Bognor Regis Town	Undisclosed	
30 July 2021	CF	ENG	Josh Woods	(England) Clay Brow	Free transfer	
5 August 2021	LW	ENG	Jack Nolan	(England) Walsall	Free transfer	
26 August 2021	RB	WAL	Mitch Clark	(England) Leicester City	Free transfer	
31 August 2021	CM	SCO	Ethan Hamilton	(England) Peterborough United	Undisclosed	
7 January 2022	LB	ENG	Rosaire Longelo	(England) Newcastle United	Undisclosed	
14 January 2022	CB	AUS	Jay Rich-Baghuelou	(England) Crystal Palace	Undisclosed	
1 February 2022	RW	NGA	Korede Adedoyin	(England) Sheffield Wednesday	Undisclosed	

=== Loans in ===
Date from	Position	Nationality	Name	From	Date until	Ref.
1 July 2021	CF	SWE	Joel Mumbongo	(England) Burnley	End of season	
1 July 2021	GK	ENG	James Trafford	(England) Manchester City	13 January 2022 (Note: On 13 January, Trafford was recalled by his parent club Manchester City.)	
20 August 2021	CB	ENG	Sam Sherring	(England) Bournemouth	11 January 2022 (Note: On 11 January, Sherring was recalled by his parent club Bournemouth.)	
27 August 2021	CB	GHA	Yeboah Amankwah	(England) Manchester City	End of season	
31 August 2021	CF	ENG	Jovan Malcolm	(England) West Bromwich Albion	End of season	
31 January 2022	AM	ENG	Marcel Lewis	(Belgium) Royale Union Saint-Gilloise	End of season	

=== Loans out ===
Date from	Position	Nationality	Name	To	Date until	Ref.
16 October 2021	RB	ENG	Harry Perritt	(England) Torquay United	1 January 2022	
12 November 2021	CF	ENG	Kevin Spinelli	(England) Radcliffe	12 December 2021	
27 January 2022	CF	ENG	Joe Hardy	(Scotland) Inverness Caledonian Thistle	End of season	
18 February 2022	CF	ENG	Lewis Mansell	(England) Southport	26 March 2022	
19 February 2022	CB	ENG	Harry Perritt	(England) Altrinham	End of season	
22 February 2022	AM	ENG	Owen Devonport	(England) Padiham		
22 February 2022	FW	ENG	Jack Doherty	(England) AFC Darwen		
25 February 2022	GK	ENG	Louis Hood	(England) AFC Darwen		

=== Transfers out ===
Date	Position	Nationality	Name	To	Fee	Ref.
30 June 2021	DF	ENG	Jack Bolton		Released	
30 June 2021	CB	ENG	Mark Hughes	(England) Bristol Rovers	Rejected contract	
30 June 2021	LB	ENG	Joe Maguire	(England) Tranmere Rovers	Released	
30 June 2021	CB	ENG	Zehn Mohammed		Released	
30 June 2021	RB	AUS	Reagan Ogle	(England) Hartlepool United	Released	
30 June 2021	CM	GUI	Lamine Kaba Sherif	(England) Kettering Town	Released	
14 July 2021	RB	ENG	Ryan Graham	(England) Lancaster City	Free transfer	
2 August 2021	CB	ENG	Ben Barclay	(England) Stockport County	Free transfer	
15 August 2021	CB	AUS	Cameron Burgess	(England) Ipswich Town	Undisclosed	
1 January 2022	CF	NIR	Dion Charles	(England) Bolton Wanderers	Undisclosed (Note: The transfer was reported to be £320,000 by The Bolton News)	
