= 2020–21 Accrington Stanley F.C. season =

Accrington Stanley
2020–21 season
- Owner: Andy Holt
- Manager: John Coleman
- Stadium: Crown Ground
- League One: 11th
- FA Cup: First round
- EFL Cup: First round
- EFL Trophy: Third round
- Top goalscorer: League: Dion Charles (19); All: Dion Charles (20)
- Highest home attendance: COVID-19 prevented fans from attending games
- Lowest home attendance: COVID-19 prevented fans from attending games
- Average home league attendance: COVID-19 prevented fans from attending games
Home colours	Away colours	Third colours

The 2020–21 season was Accrington Stanley's 52nd season in their history and the third consecutive season in EFL League One, Along with League One, the club also participated in the FA Cup, EFL Cup and EFL Trophy.

The season covers the period from 1 July 2020 to 30 June 2021.

== Transfers ==
=== Transfers in ===
Date	Position	Nationality	Name	From	Fee	Ref.
3 August 2020	CB	AUS	Cameron Burgess	(England) Scunthorpe United	Free transfer	
24 August 2020	CM	ENG	Matt Butcher	(England) AFC Bournemouth	Free transfer	
2 September 2020	DM	ENG	Tom Scully	(England) Norwich City	Free transfer	
4 September 2020	CB	GER	Stephen Sama	(Netherlands) Heracles Almelo	Free transfer	
24 September 2020	MF	ENG	Rhys Fenlon	(England) Burnley	Free transfer	
9 October 2020	RB	SKN	Michael Nottingham	(England) Blackpool	Undisclosed	
6 November 2020	CF	ENG	Lewis Mansell	(Scotland) Partick Thistle	Free transfer	
4 January 2021	LW	ENG	Gary Roberts	(Wales) Bala Town	Free transfer	
1 February 2021	CM	NIR	David Morgan	(England) Southport	Undisclosed	

=== Loans in ===
Date from	Position	Nationality	Name	From	Date until	Ref.
7 August 2020	LW	IRL	Ryan Cassidy	(England) Watford	End of season	
13 August 2020	RW	ENG	Thomas Allan	(England) Newcastle United	12 January 2021	
28 August 2020	CM	LBR	Mohammed Sangare	(England) Newcastle United	End of season	
7 September 2020	CM	ENG	Tariq Uwakwe	(England) Chelsea	End of season	
2 October 2020	CM	ENG	Jon Russell	(England) Chelsea	End of season	
9 October 2020	GK	ENG	Nathan Baxter	(England) Chelsea	End of season	
28 January 2021	SS	NIR	Paul Smyth	(England) Queens Park Rangers	End of season	
1 February 2021	CM	ENG	Adam Phillips	(England) Burnley	End of season	

=== Loans out ===
Date from	Position	Nationality	Name	From	Date until	Ref.
19 October 2020	RB	AUS	Reagan Ogle	(England) AFC Fylde	16 January 2021	
7 January 2021	CF	ENG	Lewis Mansell	(England) FC Halifax Town	7 February 2021	
4 February 2021	DF	ENG	Jack Bolton	(England) Southport	Youth loan	
4 February 2021	MF	ENG	Rhys Fenlon	(England) Southport	Youth loan	
4 February 2021	RB	ENG	Harry Perritt	(England) Southport	Youth loan	
1 March 2021	RB	AUS	Reagan Ogle	(England) Altrincham	April 2021	

=== Transfers out ===
Date	Position	Nationality	Name	To	Fee	Ref.
1 July 2020	CF	POR	Wilson Carvalho	(England) Macclesfield Town	Released	
1 July 2020	MF	ENG	Lewis Doyle	(England) Atherton Collieries	Released	
1 July 2020	RB	ENG	Phil Edwards	(England) Warrington Town	Released	
1 July 2020	GK	BUL	Dimitar Evtimov	(Bulgaria) CSKA Sofia	Released	
1 July 2020	LB	ATG	Zaine Francis-Angol	(England) Boreham Wood	Released	
1 July 2020	MF	ENG	Lewis Gilboy	(England) Bury	Released	
1 July 2020	FW	ENG	Alex O'Neill	(England) Skelmersdale United	Released	
1 July 2020	CM	NIR	Andrew Scott	(Northern Ireland) Larne	Released	
1 July 2020	RW	POR	Érico Sousa	(England) Tadcaster Albion	Released	
1 July 2020	DF	ENG	Matty Williams	Unattached	Released	
1 July 2020	CF	CGO	Offrande Zanzala	(England) Crewe Alexandra	Released	
5 August 2020	RW	ENG	Jordan Clark	(England) Luton Town	Free transfer	
7 September 2020	RB	ENG	Callum Johnson	(England) Portsmouth	Undisclosed (Note: According to Transmarkt, fee was £248,000)	
16 September 2020	CM	ENG	Sam Finley	(England) Fleetwood Town	Mutual consent	
1 October 2020	CM	ENG	Niall Watson	(England) Southport	Free transfer	
2 March 2021	LW	ENG	Gary Roberts	Retired	—N/a	

== First-team squad ==
As of 10 May 2021

Note: Flags indicate national team as has been defined under FIFA eligibility rules. Players may hold more than one non-FIFA nationality.

No.	Name	Nat.	Position(s)	Date of birth (age)	Apps.	Goals	Year signed	Signed from	Transfer fee
Goalkeepers
1	Nathan Baxter	(England)	GK	8 November 1998 (age 27)	20	0	2020	(England) Chelsea	Loan
30	Liam Isherwood	(England)	GK	13 July 2002 (age 24)	0	0	2020	Academy	Trainee
40	Toby Savin	(England)	GK	26 May 2000 (age 26)	37	0	2017	Academy	Trainee
Defenders
2	Michael Nottingham	(Saint Kitts and Nevis) (England)	CB/RB	14 April 1989 (age 37)	49	4	2020	(England) Blackpool	Undisclosed
3	Mark Hughes	(England)	CB	9 December 1986 (age 39)	242	10	2016	(England) Stevenage	Undisclosed
4	Cameron Burgess	(Australia)	CB	21 October 1995 (age 30)	51	5	2020	(England) Scunthorpe United	Free
5	Ross Sykes	(England)	CB	26 March 1999 (age 27)	87	8	2015	Academy	Trainee
12	Joe Maguire	(England)	LB/RB/CB	18 January 1996 (age 30)	20	0	2019	(England) Fleetwood Town	Free
16	Ben Barclay	(England)	CB/DM	7 October 1996 (age 29)	43	1	2019	(England) Brighton & Hove Albion	Free
18	Harvey Rodgers	(England)	RB/CB	20 October 1996 (age 29)	69	1	2018	(England) Fleetwood Town	Undisclosed
21	Harry Perritt	(England)	RB/CB	12 June 2000 (age 26)	2	0	2019	Academy	Trainee
23	Jack Bolton	(England)	DF	22 November 2001 (age 24)	0	0	2019	Academy	Trainee
24	Stephen Sama	(Germany) (Cameroon)	CB/RB/DM	5 March 1993 (age 33)	9	0	2020	(Netherlands) Heracles Almelo	Free
27	Reagan Ogle	(England) (Australia)	RB/LB	29 March 1999 (age 27)	0	0	2016	Academy	Trainee
33	Zehn Mohammed	(England)	CB	28 February 2000 (age 26)	4	0	2017	Academy	Trainee
Midfielders
6	Matt Butcher	(England)	DM/CM/CB	14 May 1997 (age 29)	50	2	2020	(England) AFC Bournemouth	Undisclosed
8	Jon Russell	(England)	CM/AM/DM	9 October 2000 (age 25)	25	3	2020	(England) Chelsea	Loan
10	Joe Pritchard	(England)	CM/RM/LM	10 September 1996 (age 30)	71	13	2019	(England) Bolton Wanderers	Free
11	Sean McConville	(England)	LM/CM	6 March 1989 (age 37)	340	61	2015	(England) Chester	Undisclosed
14	Tariq Uwakwe	(England) (Nigeria)	CM/DM/AM	19 November 1999 (age 26)	20	4	2020	(England) Chelsea	Loan
15	Mo Sangare	(Liberia)	CM/DM/AM	28 December 1998 (age 27)	4	0	2020	(England) Newcastle United	Loan
17	Lamine Kaba Sherif	(Guinea)	CM/DM/CB	27 January 1999 (age 27)	0	0	2019	(England) Leicester City	Free
20	Tom Scully	(England)	DM/CM	1 October 1999 (age 26)	5	0	2020	(England) Norwich City	Free
25	Rhys Fenlon	(England)	MF	2 October 2001 (age 24)	4	0	2020	Academy	Trainee
28	Seamus Conneely	(Republic of Ireland) (England)	DM/RB/RM	22 June 1988 (age 38)	261	12	2015	(Republic of Ireland) Sligo Rovers	Undisclosed
36	Adam Phillips	(England)	CM	15 January 1998 (age 28)	21	1	2021	(England) Burnley	Loan
37	David Morgan	(Northern Ireland)	CM	4 July 1994 (age 32)	16	0	2021	(England) Southport	Undisclosed
Forwards
7	Paul Smyth	(Northern Ireland)	SS/RW/LW	10 September 1997 (age 29)	19	3	2021	(England) Queens Park Rangers	Loan
9	Ryan Cassidy	(Republic of Ireland)	LW/RW/CF	2 March 2001 (age 25)	17	4	2020	(England) Watford	Loan
19	Colby Bishop	(England)	CF	4 November 1996 (age 29)	77	24	2018	(England) Leamington	Undisclosed
26	Lewis Mansell	(England)	CF	20 September 1997 (age 29)	2	1	2020	(Scotland) Partick Thistle	Free
32	Dion Charles	(Northern Ireland)	CF	7 October 1995 (age 30)	90	28	2019	(England) Southport	Undisclosed
34	Kevin Spinelli	(England)	CF	25 July 2002 (age 24)	2	0	2020	Academy	Trainee
35	Gary Roberts	(England)	LW/RW/AM	18 March 1984 (age 42)	70	23	2021	(Wales) Bala Town	Free

== Pre-season ==
22 August 2020 Friendly	Accrington Stanley	0-3	Bolton Wanderers	Bamber Bridge
		Report	Delfouneso 13'; Doyle 30' (pen.); Trialist 90+2' (pen.)	Stadium: Sir Tom Finney Stadium; Attendance: Behind closed doors

29 August 2020 Friendly	Salford City	0–1	Accrington Stanley	Salford
15:00 BST			Cassidy 52' (pen.)	Stadium: The Peninsula Stadium; Attendance: 0

== Competitions ==
=== EFL League One ===
==== League table ====
Pos	Team	Pld	W	D	L	GF	GA	GD	Pts
7	Charlton Athletic	46	20	14	12	70	56	+14	74
8	Portsmouth	46	21	9	16	65	51	+14	72
9	Ipswich Town	46	19	12	15	46	46	0	69
10	Gillingham	46	19	10	17	63	60	+3	67
11	Accrington Stanley	46	18	13	15	63	68	−5	67
12	Crewe Alexandra	46	18	12	16	56	61	−5	66
13	Milton Keynes Dons	46	18	11	17	64	62	+2	65
14	Doncaster Rovers	46	19	7	20	63	67	−4	64
15	Fleetwood Town	46	16	12	18	49	46	+3	60

Source: EFL Official Website
Rules for classification: 1) Points; 2) Goal difference; 3) Number of goals scored; 4) Head-to-head results; 5) Wins; 6) Away goals; 7) Penalty points (sec 9.5); 8) 12-point sending off offences

==== Results summary ====
Overall								Home						Away					
Pld	W	D	L	GF	GA	GD	Pts	W	D	L	GF	GA	GD	W	D	L	GF	GA	GD
46	18	13	15	63	68	−5	67	10	7	6	31	26	+5	8	6	9	32	42	−10

Last updated: 9 May 2021.
Source: BBC

==== Results by matchday ====
Matchday	1	2	3	4	5	6	7	8	9	10	11	12	13	14	15	16	17	18	19	20	21	22	23	24	25	26	27	28	29	30	31	32	33	34	35	36	37	38	39	40	41	42	43	44	45	46
Ground	H	A	H	A	H	A	H	A	A	H	H	A	H	A	A	H	A	H	A	H	A	H	H	H	A	A	H	A	A	H	H	A	A	H	H	A	H	A	H	A	A	H	A	H	H	A
Result	W	L	L	W	W	L	W	W	W	D	W	W	W	L	W	D	W	L	L	W	D	W	D	L	D	W	D	L	D	L	W	L	L	L	W	L	D	W	L	D	L	W	D	D	D	W
Position	2	8	17	9	6	9	7	11	10	9	9	9	7	10	8	8	6	9	10	8	9	7	8	8	9	6	7	7	7	8	7	10	10	13	12	13	13	11	12	11	13	12	12	11	13	11

Updated to match(es) played on 9 May 2021. Source: 11v11 for league tables and fixtures
A = Away; H = Home; W = Win; D = Draw; L = Loss

==== Matches ====
Win Draw Loss Postponed

The 2020–21 season fixtures were released on 21 August.

===== September =====
12 September 2020 1	Accrington Stanley	2–0	Peterborough United	Accrington
15:00 BST	Charles 46'; Sykes (yellow card) 58'; Uwakwe 85'	Report	Thompson (yellow card) 39'; Beevers (yellow card) 89'	Stadium: Wham Stadium; Attendance: 0 Referee: Marc Edwards

19 September 2020 2	Burton Albion	2–1	Accrington Stanley	Burton upon Trent
15:00 BST	Quinn (yellow card) 56'; Powell 72'; Brayford 87'; Garratt (yellow card) 90+4'	Report	Burgess (yellow card) 76'; Pritchard 83'; Allan (yellow card) 85'	Stadium: Pirelli Stadium; Attendance: 0 Referee: Josh Smith

26 September 2020 3	Accrington Stanley	1–4	Oxford United	Accrington
15:00 BST	Rodgers (yellow card) 44'; Hughes (yellow card) 55'; Cassidy 72' (pen.); Charles (red card) 75'; Pritchard (yellow card) 90'	Report	Henry 45'; Pritchard 73' (o.g.); Taylor 85', 87'	Stadium: Wham Stadium; Attendance: 0 Referee: Ross Joyce

===== October =====
3 October 2020 4	AFC Wimbledon	1–2	Accrington Stanley	Shepherd's Bush
15:00 BST	Longman 18'; Woodyard (yellow card) 27'	Report	Sykes 41'; Butcher 45'; Cassidy (yellow card) 62'; Pritchard (yellow card) 90+4'	Stadium: Kiyan Prince Foundation Stadium; Attendance: 0 Referee: Christopher Pollard

10 October 2020 5	Accrington Stanley	2–1	Rochdale	Accrington
15:00 BST	Pritchard 64'; Russell 66'	Report	Keohane 54'	Stadium: Wham Stadium; Attendance: 0 Referee: Scott Oldham

17 October 2020 6	Ipswich Town	2–0	Accrington Stanley	Ipswich
15:00 BST	Edwards 55'; Sears 71'; Chambers (yellow card) 81'	Report	Burgess (yellow card) 80'	Stadium: Portman Road; Attendance: 0 Referee: Robert Lewis

20 October 2020 7	Accrington Stanley	1–0	Fleetwood Town	Accrington
19:00 BST	Sykes (yellow card) 55'; Charles 73'	Report	Holgate (yellow card) 43'	Stadium: Wham Stadium; Attendance: 0 Referee: Darren Drysdale

===== November =====
14 November 2020 8	Northampton Town	0–1	Accrington Stanley	Northampton
15:00 GMT		Report	Russell 2'; Bishop (yellow card) 4'; Savin (yellow card) 62'	Stadium: PTS Academy Stadium; Attendance: 0 Referee: Kevin Johnson

17 November 2020 9	Swindon Town	0–3	Accrington Stanley	Swindon
19:00 GMT	Grounds (yellow card) 73'	Report	Fryer 6' (o.g.); Bishop 25'; Charles 38'	Stadium: County Ground; Attendance: 0 Referee: Tom Nield

21 November 2020 10	Accrington Stanley	0–0	Lincoln City	Accrington
15:00 GMT	McConville 71	Report	Johnson (yellow card) 57'; Eyoma (yellow card) 68'	Stadium: Wham Stadium; Attendance: 0 Referee: Andy Haines

24 November 2020 11	Accrington Stanley	1–0	Crewe Alexandra	Accrington
19:00 GMT	Russell (yellow card) 35'; Bishop 59'	Report	Pickering (yellow card) 58'; Dale (yellow card) 62'	Stadium: Wham Stadium; Attendance: 0 Referee: Anthony Backhouse

===== December =====
2 December 2020 12	Shrewsbury Town	2-2	Accrington Stanley	Shrewsbury
18:00 GMT	Pierre 26'; Norburn (yellow card) 33'; Williams (yellow card) 38'; Walker (yellow card) 41'; Vela (yellow card) 57'; Whalley 86'	Report	Pritchard 24'; Hughes (yellow card) 84'; Cassidy 90+'	Stadium: New Meadow; Attendance: 2000; Referee: Ben Speedie

5 December 2020 13	Accrington Stanley	2–1	Milton Keynes Dons	Accrington
15:00 GMT	Charles 8', 62'; Pritchard (yellow card) 43'	Report	Gladwin (yellow card) 20'; Kasumu (yellow card) 27'; Sorinola (yellow card) 49'; Morris 53'; Harvie (yellow card) 81'	Stadium: Wham Stadium; Attendance: 0 Referee: Antony Coggins

12 December 2020 14	Wigan Athletic	4–3	Accrington Stanley	Wigan
15:00 GMT	James 14'; Gardner 19'; Keane 32' (pen.); Hughes 83' (o.g.)	Report	Conneely (yellow card) 45+3'; Pritchard 61'; Nottingham 65'; Hughes (yellow card) 81'; Burgess 86'	Stadium: DW Stadium; Attendance: 0 Referee: Marc Edwards

15 December 2020 15	Gillingham	0–2	Accrington Stanley	Gillingham
17:30 GMT	O'Connor (yellow card) 73'	Report	Bishop 44'; Charles 64'; Butcher (yellow card) 90'	Stadium: Priestfield Stadium; Attendance: 0 Referee: Andy Woolmer

19 December 2020 16	Accrington Stanley	0–0	Blackpool	Accrington
15:00 GMT		Report	Dougall (yellow card) 55'	Stadium: Wham Stadium; Attendance: 0 Referee: Declan Bourne

===== January =====
8 January 2021 17	Charlton Athletic	0–2	Accrington Stanley	Charlton
19:45 GMT	Morgan (yellow card) 52'; Maatsen (yellow card) 85'	Report	Bishop 36', 67'; Pritchard (yellow card) 83'	Stadium: The Valley; Attendance: 0 Referee: Sam Purkiss

16 January 2021 18	Accrington Stanley	0–1	Gillingham	Accrington
15:00 GMT	Sykes (yellow card) 45'; Nottingham (yellow card) 62'	Report	Dempsey 45+1'; Jackson (yellow card) 80'	Stadium: Wham Stadium; Attendance: 0 Referee: Darren Drysdale

19 January 2021 19	Hull City	3–0	Accrington Stanley	Kingston upon Hull
17:30 GMT	Wilks 37'; Whyte 55'; Honeyman (yellow card) 57'; Magennis 67' (pen.); Jones (yellow card) 69'	Report	McConville (yellow card) 31'; Burgess (yellow card) 52' (yellow-red card) 66'	Stadium: KCOM Stadium; Attendance: 0 Referee: Tom Nield

26 January 2021 20	Accrington Stanley	2–0	Hull City	Accrington
17:30 GMT	Charles 50'; Conneely (yellow card) 64'; Butcher 68'	Report	Elder (yellow card) 27'; Lewis-Potter (yellow card) 37'	Stadium: Wham Stadium; Attendance: 0 Referee: Will Finnie

30 January 2021 21	Plymouth Argyle	2–2	Accrington Stanley	Plymouth
15:00 GMT	Jephcott 43'; Ennis 78'; Opoku (yellow card) 87'; Lewis (yellow card) 88'	Report	Pritchard 41'; Charles 46'; Barclay (yellow card) 63'; Butcher (yellow card) 74'	Stadium: Home Park; Attendance: 0 Referee: Neil Hair

===== February =====
2 February 2021 22	Accrington Stanley	6–1	Bristol Rovers	Accrington
19:30 GMT	Pritchard (yellow card) 7', (goal) 8'; Charles 12', 17', 70'; Bishop 28', 48'; McConville (yellow card) 44'	Report	Nicholson 11'; Williams (yellow card) 61'	Stadium: Wham Stadium; Attendance: 0 Referee: Carl Boyeson

6 February 2021 23	Accrington Stanley	0–0	Northampton Town	Accrington
15:00 GMT	Pritchard (yellow card) 71' (yellow-red card) 85'; Bishop (yellow card) 86'	Report	Jones (yellow card) 69'; McWilliams (yellow card) 86'	Stadium: Wham Stadium; Attendance: 0 Referee: Peter Wright

9 February 2021 24	Accrington Stanley	0–1	Plymouth Argyle	Accrington
17:30 GMT	Conneely (yellow card) 62'	Report	Ennis 51'; Opoku (yellow card) 70'; Fornah (yellow card) 74'	Stadium: Wham Stadium; Attendance: 0 Referee: Tom Nield

14 February 2021 25	Lincoln City	2–2	Accrington Stanley	Lincoln
18:00 GMT	Rogers 53'; McGrandles (yellow card) 80'; Grant (yellow card) 83'; Hopper 84'	Report	Charles 6', 90'; Barclay (yellow card) 14'	Stadium: LNER Stadium; Attendance: 0 Referee: Martin Coy

16 February 2021 26	Doncaster Rovers	0–1	Accrington Stanley	Doncaster
19:00 GMT		Report	Smyth 42' (yellow card) 79'	Stadium: Keepmoat Stadium; Referee: Dean Whitestone

20 February 2021 27	Accrington Stanley	1–1	Shrewsbury Town	Accrington
15:00 GMT	Barclay (yellow card) 14'; Conneely (yellow card) 45+1' (goal) 47'; Morgan (yellow card) 80'	Report	Main (yellow card) 56'; Whalley 77'	Stadium: Wham Stadium; Attendance: 0 Referee: Alan Young

23 February 2021 28	Crewe Alexandra	2–0	Accrington Stanley	Crewe
19:00 GMT	Beckles 32'; Lowery (yellow card) 45+1'; Porter 79'	Report	Rodgers (red card) 50'; Hughes (yellow card) 70'	Stadium: Alexandra Stadium; Attendance: 0 Referee: Brett Huxtable

27 February 2021 29	Fleetwood Town	1–1	Accrington Stanley	Fleetwood
15:00 GMT	Burns (yellow card) 4', (goal) 24'; Camps (yellow card) 45+3'; Morris (penalty missed) 79'; Connolly (yellow card) 79'	Report	Phillips 22'; Burgess (yellow card) 78'	Stadium: Highbury Stadium; Attendance: 0 Referee: Sam Allison

===== March =====
2 March 2021 30	Accrington Stanley	1–2	Ipswich Town	Accrington
19:00 GMT	Charles 4', (yellow card) 48'; Conneely (red card) 16'; Burgess (yellow card) 45+6'; McConville (yellow card) 67'	Report	Norwood (penalty missed) 17', 45+6'; Wilson 41', (yellow card) 79'	Stadium: Wham Stadium; Attendance: 0 Referee: Bobby Madley

6 March 2021 31	Accrington Stanley	2–1	Swindon Town	Accrington
15:00 GMT	Charles 11'; Hughes (yellow card) 31'; Bishop 44'; Butcher (yellow card) 45+2'; Burgess (yellow card) 59'	Report	Pitman 30'	Stadium: Wham Stadium; Attendance: 0 Referee: Alan Clayton

9 March 2021 32	Bristol Rovers	4–1	Accrington Stanley	Bristol
19:00 GMT	Leahy 15'; Rodman 45+1'; Nicholson 67'; Westbrooke 68'; McCormick (yellow card) 78'	Report	Barclay (yellow card) 35'; Smyth 77'	Stadium: Memorial Stadium; Attendance: 0 Referee: James Bell

13 March 2021 33	Milton Keynes Dons	3–2	Accrington Stanley	Milton Keynes
15:00 GMT	Jerome 6', 55'; O'Riley 90+1'	Report	Smyth (yellow card) 45'; Burgess (yellow card) 47'; Barclay (yellow card) 49'; Charles 57'; Surman 62' (o.g.); Rodgers (yellow card) 67'; Morgan (yellow card) 80'	Stadium: Stadium MK; Attendance: 0 Referee: Dean Whitestone

17 March 2021 34	Accrington Stanley	0-2	Sunderland	Accrington
19:00 GMT	Nottingham (yellow card) 20'; Smyth (yellow card) 53'	Report	Gooch (yellow card) 20'; McGeady (yellow card) 58'; Stewart 62'; Wyke 86'	Stadium: Wham Stadium; Attendance: 0 Referee: John Busby

20 March 2021 35	Accrington Stanley	3–1	Wigan Athletic	Accrington
15:00 GMT	Burgess 3'; Nottingham 15'; Charles 61' (pen.) (yellow card) 89'; Morgan (yellow card) 63'	Report	Lang 1'	Stadium: Wham Stadium; Attendance: 0 Referee: Ben Toner

27 March 2021 36	Peterborough United	7–0	Accrington Stanley	Peterborough
15:00 GMT	Clarke-Harris 3', 9', 65'; Szmodics 23', 48'; Eisa 77'; Kanu 82'	Report	Morgan (yellow card) 73'; Maguire (yellow card) 82'	Stadium: Weston Homes Stadium; Attendance: 0 Referee: Sam Purkiss

===== April =====
2 April 2021 37	Accrington Stanley	0–0	Burton Albion	Accrington
15:00 BST		Report	Mancienne (yellow card) 53'	Stadium: Wham Stadium; Attendance: 0 Referee: Seb Stockbridge

5 April 2021 38	Oxford United	1–2	Accrington Stanley	Oxford
15:00 BST	Lee 25', (yellow card) 54'; Taylor (yellow card) 88'	Report	Smyth 16'; Butcher (yellow card) 58'; Nottingham 70'; Rodgers (yellow card) 87'	Stadium: The Kassam Stadium; Attendance: 0 Referee: Ollie Yates

10 April 2021 39	Accrington Stanley	1–5	AFC Wimbledon	Accrington
15:00 BST	Nottingham 4'; Burgess (yellow card) 56'	Report	Palmer 21', 42'; Assal 45+1', 64', (yellow card) 65'; Pigott 57'; Heneghan (yellow card) 67' (yellow-red card) 90+2'	Stadium: Wham Stadium; Attendance: 0 Referee: James Oldham

13 April 2021 40	Blackpool	0–0	Accrington Stanley	Blackpool
19:00 BST	Ballard (yellow card) 90+4'	Report	Morgan (yellow card) 24'; Rodgers (yellow card) 75'; Burgess (yellow card) 85'; Bishop (penalty missed) 88'	Stadium: Bloomfield Road; Attendance: 0 Referee: Sam Barrott

17 April 2021 41	Rochdale	3–1	Accrington Stanley	Rochdale
12:30 BST	Keohane 10'; McLaughlin (yellow card) 29'; Beesley 66', (yellow card) 90+5'; Shaughnessy 90+1'	Report	Barclay 13', (yellow card) 46'; Smyth (yellow card) 22'; Burgess (yellow card) 90'	Stadium: Spotland; Attendance: 0 Referee: Scott Oldham

20 April 2021 42	Accrington Stanley	2–1	Doncaster Rovers	Accrington
19:00 BST	Charles 41' (pen.), 90+1' (pen.)	Report	Balcombe (yellow card) 40'; John-Jules 76'; James (yellow card) 87'; Anderson (yellow card) 89'	Stadium: Wham Stadium; Attendance: 0 Referee: Anthony Backhouse

24 April 2021 43	Sunderland	3–3	Accrington Stanley	Sunderland
15:00 BST	Wyke 6', 11'; Winchester (yellow card) 43'; Leadbitter (yellow card) 62'; Power 83'	Report	Bishop 51'; O'Nien 68' (o.g.); Nottingham (yellow card) 80'; McConville 85'; Smyth (yellow card) 87'	Stadium: Stadium of Light; Attendance: 0 Referee: Darren Drysdale

27 April 2021 44	Accrington Stanley	3–3	Portsmouth	Accrington
19:00 BST	Bishop 15'; Burgess 43'; Barclay (yellow card) 90+3'; Conneely (yellow card) 90+4'; Marquis 90+5' (o.g.)	Report	Marquis 49', 90+1'; Williams 54'; Curtis (yellow card) 84'; Cannon (yellow card) 86'	Stadium: Wham Stadium; Attendance: 0 Referee: Bobby Madley

===== May =====
1 May 2021 45	Accrington Stanley	1–1	Charlton Athletic	Accrington
15:00 BST	Russell (yellow card) 63'; McConville (yellow card) 73'; Pritchard 81'; Rodgers (yellow card) 90+5'	Report	Forster-Caskey (yellow card) 70'; Inniss (yellow card) 89'; Aneke 90+5'	Stadium: Wham Stadium; Attendance: 0 Referee: Alan Young

9 May 2021 46	Portsmouth	0–1	Accrington Stanley	Milton
12:00 BST	Harness (yellow card) 18'; Downing (yellow card) 28'; Byers (yellow card) 64'; White (yellow card) 66'	Report	Phillips 23'; Rodgers (yellow card) 62'	Stadium: Fratton Park; Attendance: 0 Referee: Sam Purkiss

=== FA Cup ===
The draw for the first round was made on Monday 26, October.

Win Draw Loss

7 November 2020 First round	Tranmere Rovers	2–1	Accrington Stanley	Birkenhead
15:00 GMT	Blackett-Taylor 13'; Clarke 84'	Report	Bishop 24'; Butcher (yellow card) 64'; Burgess (yellow card) 88'	Stadium: Prenton Park; Attendance: 0 Referee: Graham Salisbury

=== EFL Cup ===
Win Draw Loss

The first round draw was made on 18 August, live on Sky Sports, by Paul Merson.

4 September 2020 First round	Burton Albion	1–1 (4–2 p)	Accrington Stanley	Burton upon Trent
19:30 BST	Akins 32'; Eardley (yellow card) 81'	Report	Burgess 82'	Stadium: Pirelli Stadium; Attendance: 0 Referee: Andy Haines
	Penalties
	Akins (penalty scored); Hemmings (penalty scored); Quinn (penalty scored); Eardley (penalty scored)		Pritchard (penalty missed); Butcher (penalty missed); Sangare (penalty scored); Charles (penalty scored)

=== EFL Trophy ===
Win Draw Loss

The regional group stage draw was confirmed on 18 August. The second round draw was made by Matt Murray on 20 November, at St Andrew's. The third round was made on 10 December 2020 by Jon Parkin.

Pos	Div	Team	Pld	W	PW	PL	L	GF	GA	GD	Pts	Qualification
1	L1	Accrington Stanley	3	2	1	0	0	9	1	+8	8	Advance to Round 2
2	L1	Blackpool	3	1	1	1	0	4	1	+3	6	Advance to Round 2
3	L2	Barrow	3	0	1	1	1	2	3	−1	3	
4	ACA	Leeds United U21	3	0	0	1	2	2	12	−10	1	

Source: EFL.com

8 September 2020 Group stage	Accrington Stanley	7–0	Leeds United U21	Accrington
19:00 BST	Uwakwe 5', 22', 72'; Burgess 14'; Charles 30'; Cassidy 38', 55'	Report	Moore (yellow card) 13'; Leverett (yellow card) 52'; Dean (yellow card) 75'	Stadium: Wham Stadium; Attendance: 0 Referee: Ben Toner

6 October 2020 Group stage	Accrington Stanley	1–1 (4–3 p)	Blackpool	Accrington
19:00 BST	Bishop 79'	Report	Anderson 10'	Stadium: Wham Stadium; Attendance: 0 Referee: Ben Speedie
	Penalties
	Bishop (penalty missed); Charles (penalty scored); Sykes (penalty scored); Pritchard (penalty scored); Scully (penalty scored)		Yates (penalty scored); Robson (penalty scored); Anderson (penalty scored); Ward (penalty missed); Kemp (penalty missed)

10 November 2020 Group stage	Barrow	0–1	Accrington Stanley	Barrow-in-Furness
19:00 GMT	Quigley (penalty missed) 11'; Taylor (yellow card) 60'; Ntlhe (yellow card) 62'	Report	Mansell 4'; Barclay (yellow card) 7'; Burgess (yellow card) 79'; Scully (yellow card) 88'	Stadium: Furness Building Society Stadium; Attendance: 0 Referee: James Bell

8 December 2020 Second round	Accrington Stanley	3–2	Manchester United U21	Accrington
19:00 GMT	Burgess 8' (yellow card) 53'; Pritchard 67', 85'; McConville (yellow card) 84'	Report	Pellistri 39'; Elanga 61'; Mejbri (yellow card) 82'	Stadium: Wham Stadium; Attendance: 0 Referee: Thomas Bramall

12 January 2021 Third round	Lincoln City	4–0	Accrington Stanley	Lincoln
19:00 GMT	Elbouzedi 32'; Gotts 53'; Johnson 62'; Grant 90+2'	Report	Mohammed (yellow card) 64'; Barclay (yellow card) 77'	Stadium: LNER Stadium; Attendance: 0 Referee: Chris Sarginson

== Statistics ==
As of match played 9 May 2021

No.	Pos	Nat	Player	Total		League One		FA Cup		League Cup		League Trophy	
No.	Pos	Nat	Player	Apps	Goals	Apps	Goals	Apps	Goals	Apps	Goals	Apps	Goals
1	GK	(England) ENG	Nathan Baxter	22	0	19+0	0	1+0	0	0+0	0	2+0	0
2	DF	(England) ENG	Callum Johnson	1	0	0+0	0	0+0	0	1+0	0	0+0	0
2	DF	(Saint Kitts and Nevis) SKN	Michael Nottingham	43	4	41+1	4	1+0	0	0+0	0	0+0	0
3	DF	(England) ENG	Mark Hughes	41	0	36+0	0	1+0	0	1+0	0	3+0	0
4	DF	(Australia) AUS	Cameron Burgess	50	6	42+2	3	1+0	0	1+0	1	4+0	2
5	DF	(England) ENG	Ross Sykes	14	1	9+0	1	1+0	0	1+0	0	3+0	0
6	MF	(England) ENG	Matt Butcher	49	2	39+3	2	1+0	0	1+0	0	4+1	0
7	FW	(England) ENG	Tom Allan	8	0	1+3	0	0+1	0	1+0	0	2+0	0
7	FW	(Northern Ireland) NIR	Paul Smyth	21	3	16+5	3	0+0	0	0+0	0	0+0	0
8	MF	(England) ENG	Jon Russell	25	1	13+11	1	1+0	0	0+0	0	0+0	0
9	FW	(Republic of Ireland) IRL	Ryan Cassidy	17	5	5+6	3	0+1	0	1+0	0	4+0	2
10	MF	(England) ENG	Joe Pritchard	33	10	25+2	8	1+0	0	1+0	0	2+2	2
11	MF	(England) ENG	Sean McConville	32	1	27+4	1	0+0	0	0+0	0	1+0	0
12	DF	(England) ENG	Joe Maguire	7	0	5+0	0	0+0	0	0+0	0	2+0	0
14	MF	(England) ENG	Tariq Uwakwe	21	4	12+3	1	0+1	0	0+0	0	4+1	3
15	MF	(Liberia) LBR	Mo Sangare	4	0	1+1	0	0+0	0	0+1	0	1+0	0
16	DF	(England) ENG	Ben Barclay	31	1	23+3	1	0+0	0	1+0	0	4+0	0
18	DF	(England) ENG	Harvey Rodgers	30	0	28+1	0	0+0	0	0+0	0	0+1	0
19	FW	(England) ENG	Colby Bishop	45	12	38+3	10	1+0	1	0+0	0	1+2	1
20	MF	(England) ENG	Tom Scully	6	0	0+3	0	0+0	0	0+0	0	2+1	0
21	MF	(England) ENG	Harry Perritt	3	0	0+2	0	0+0	0	0+0	0	1+0	0
23	DF	(England) ENG	Jack Bolton	1	0	0+0	0	0+0	0	0+0	0	0+1	0
24	DF	(Germany) GER	Stephen Sama	8	0	2+2	0	0+0	0	0+0	0	3+1	0
25	MF	(England) ENG	Rhys Fenlon	4	0	0+2	0	0+0	0	0+0	0	1+1	0
26	FW	(England) ENG	Lewis Mansell	4	1	0+2	0	0+0	0	0+0	0	2+0	1
28	MF	(Republic of Ireland) IRL	Seamus Conneely	42	1	38+1	1	1+0	0	0+0	0	1+1	0
32	FW	(Northern Ireland) NIR	Dion Charles	49	20	42+0	19	1+0	0	1+0	0	2+3	1
33	DF	(England) ENG	Zehn Mohammed	3	0	0+0	0	0+0	0	0+0	0	2+1	0
34	FW	(England) ENG	Kevin Spinelli	2	0	0+0	0	0+0	0	0+1	0	0+1	0
35	FW	(England) ENG	Gary Roberts	2	1	0+2	0	0+0	0	0	0+0	0	1+0
36	MF	(England) ENG	Adam Phillips	21	0	12+9	0	0+0	0	0	0	0	0
37	MF	(Northern Ireland) NIR	David Morgan	16	0	9+7	0	0+0	0	0	0	0	0
40	GK	(England) ENG	Toby Savin	34	0	29+1	0	0+0	0	1+0	0	3+0	0

=== Goals record ===
As of match played 9 May 2021

Rank	No.	Nat.	Po.	Name	League One	FA Cup	League Cup	League Trophy	Total
1	32	(Northern Ireland)	CF	Dion Charles	19	0	0	1	20
2	19	(England)	CF	Colby Bishop	10	1	0	1	12
3	10	(England)	CM	Joe Pritchard	8	0	0	2	10
4	4	(Australia)	CB	Cameron Burgess	3	0	1	2	6
5	9	(Republic of Ireland)	CF	Ryan Cassidy	3	0	0	2	5
6	2	(Saint Kitts and Nevis)	RB	Michael Nottingham	4	0	0	0	4
6	14	(England)	CM	Tariq Uwakwe	1	0	0	3	4
8	7	(Northern Ireland)	CF	Paul Smyth	3	0	0	0	3
9	6	(England)	DM	Matt Butcher	2	0	0	0	2
9	8	(England)	CM	Jon Russell	2	0	0	0	2
11	5	(England)	CB	Ross Sykes	1	0	0	0	1
11	11	(England)	LM	Sean McConville	1	0	0	0	1
11	16	(England)	CB	Ben Barclay	1	0	0	0	1
11	26	(England)	CF	Lewis Mansell	0	0	0	1	1
11	28	(Northern Ireland)	CM	Seamus Conneely	1	0	0	0	1
Own Goals					4	0	0	0	4
Total					62	1	1	12	76

=== Disciplinary record ===
As of match played 9 May 2021

Rank	No.	Nat.	Po.	Name	League One			FA Cup			League Cup			League Trophy			Total		
Rank	No.	Nat.	Po.	Name	Booked	(yellow card) (yellow-red card)	Sent off (straight red)	Booked	(yellow card) (yellow-red card)	Sent off (straight red)	Booked	(yellow card) (yellow-red card)	Sent off (straight red)	Booked	(yellow card) (yellow-red card)	Sent off (straight red)	Booked	(yellow card) (yellow-red card)	Sent off (straight red)
1	4	(Australia)	CB	Cameron Burgess	9	1	0	1	0	0	0	0	0	2	0	0	12	1	0
2	16	(England)	CB	Ben Barclay	7	0	0	0	0	0	0	0	0	2	0	0	9	0	0
3	10	(England)	CM	Joe Pritchard	6	1	0	0	0	0	0	0	0	0	0	0	6	1	0
4	3	(England)	CB	Mark Hughes	6	0	0	0	0	0	0	0	0	0	0	0	6	0	0
4	11	(England)	LM	Sean McConville	4	0	1	0	0	0	0	0	0	1	0	0	5	0	1
4	18	(England)	RB	Harvey Rodgers	5	0	1	0	0	0	0	0	0	0	0	0	5	0	1
4	28	(Republic of Ireland)	CM	Seamus Conneely	5	0	1	0	0	0	0	0	0	0	0	0	5	0	1
8	7	(Northern Ireland)	SS	Paul Smyth	5	0	0	0	0	0	0	0	0	0	0	0	5	0	0
8	6	(England)	DM	Matt Butcher	4	0	0	1	0	0	0	0	0	0	0	0	5	0	0
8	37	(England)	CM	David Morgan	5	0	0	0	0	0	0	0	0	0	0	0	5	0	0
10	2	(Saint Kitts and Nevis)	RB	Michael Nottingham	3	0	0	0	0	0	0	0	0	0	0	0	3	0	0
10	5	(England)	CB	Ross Sykes	3	0	0	0	0	0	0	0	0	0	0	0	3	0	0
10	32	(Northern Ireland)	CF	Dion Charles	2	0	1	0	0	0	0	0	0	0	0	0	2	0	1
14	8	(England)	CM	Jon Russell	2	0	0	0	0	0	0	0	0	0	0	0	2	0	0
14	19	(England)	CF	Colby Bishop	2	0	0	0	0	0	0	0	0	0	0	0	2	0	0
16	7	(England)	RW	Tom Allan	1	0	0	0	0	0	0	0	0	0	0	0	1	0	0
16	9	(Republic of Ireland)	CF	Ryan Cassidy	1	0	0	0	0	0	0	0	0	0	0	0	1	0	0
16	12	(England)	LB	Joe Maguire	1	0	0	0	0	0	0	0	0	0	0	0	1	0	0
16	20	(England)	DM	Tom Scully	0	0	0	0	0	0	0	0	0	1	0	0	1	0	0
16	33	(England)	RB	Zehn Mohammed	0	0	0	0	0	0	0	0	0	1	0	0	1	0	0
16	40	(England)	GK	Toby Savin	1	0	0	0	0	0	0	0	0	0	0	0	1	0	0
Total					71	2	4	2	0	0	0	0	0	7	0	0	82	2	4
