= Joe Pritchard (footballer, born 1996) =

English footballer (born 1996)

Personal information
- Full name: Joe Cameron Pritchard
- Date of birth: 10 September 1996 (age 30)
- Place of birth: Watford, England
- Height: 5 ft 9 in (1.74 m)
- Position: Midfielder

Team information
- Current team: Radcliffe

Youth career
- 2013–2018: Tottenham Hotspur

Senior career*
Years	Team	Apps	(Gls)
2018–2019	Bolton Wanderers	5	(0)
2019–2024	Accrington Stanley	136	(22)
2024–2025	Milton Keynes Dons	7	(0)
2025	Oldham Athletic	17	(4)
2025–2026	Rochdale	21	(2)
2026–	Radcliffe	0	(0)
- * Club domestic league appearances and goals as of 14:58, 22 August 2026 (UTC)

Joe Cameron Pritchard (born 10 September 1996) is an English professional footballer who plays as a midfielder for National League North club Radcliffe.

== Career ==
=== Early years ===
Pritchard joined the Tottenham academy in July 2013 while there he suffered a knee injury that ruled him out for a year. He was released at the end of the 2017–18 season.

=== Bolton Wanderers ===
Following his release from Spurs, Pritchard was signed on a free transfer by Bolton Wanderers in the EFL Championship. Pritchard made his debut on 9 February 2019 against Preston North End coming on in the 77th minute in place of Craig Noone.

=== Accrington Stanley ===
On 30 May 2019, Pritchard joined Accrington Stanley on a two-year deal with the option of a further 12 months. Immediately after joining, Pritchard regularly featured in Accrington's starting line-up.

=== Milton Keynes Dons ===
On 28 June 2024, Pritchard joined Milton Keynes Dons on a free transfer effective from 1 July 2024. He made his debut on 13 August 2024, in a 5–0 first round EFL Cup defeat away to Watford.

Following limited first team opportunities, Pritchard's contract with the club was mutually terminated on 3 February 2025.

=== Oldham Athletic ===
On 4 February 2025, Pritchard joined National League side Oldham Athletic on a short-term deal until the end of the season. During the 2024–25 season, Pritchard scored four goals. His first goal secured a point for Oldham in a 2–2 draw away at Dagenham and Redbridge, with his second came by way of a penalty kick away to Tamworth, also earning Latic's a 1–1 draw. His other two goals for the club came in the National League playoffs, the first sealing the win with the 4th goal against Halifax Town in a 4–0 home victory in the playoff eliminator round and the second wrapping up a 3–0 win in the semi-final away against York City securing Oldham's first visit to Wembley in over 30 years.

=== Rochdale ===
He joined Rochdale at the start of the 2025–26 season. He played their first four games before suffering a major injury only returning in November 2025. He got his first assist for the club against Everton U21's which was his first game back since returning from injury. On 18 May 2026, the club announced it was releasing him.

=== Radcliffe ===
On 22 August 2026, Pritchard joined National League North club Radcliffe on an initial one-year deal.

== Career statistics ==
As of 21 December 2024

Appearances and goals by club, season and competition
Club	Season	League			FA Cup		EFL Cup		Other		Total	
Club	Season	Division	Apps	Goals	Apps	Goals	Apps	Goals	Apps	Goals	Apps	Goals
Tottenham Hotspur U23	2017–18	—			—		—		2 (Note: Appearances in EFL Trophy)	0	2	0
Bolton Wanderers	2018–19	Championship	4	0	1	0	0	0	—		5	0
Accrington Stanley	2019–20	League One	30	2	1	0	1	0	5	1	37	3
Accrington Stanley	2020–21	League One	28	7	1	0	1	0	4	2	34	9
Accrington Stanley	2021–22	League One	10	0	0	0	2	0	0	0	12	0
Accrington Stanley	2022–23	League One	18	2	1	0	1	0	3	1	23	3
Accrington Stanley	2023–24	League Two	26	7	2	0	0	0	2	0	30	7
Accrington Stanley	Total		112	18	5	0	5	0	14	4	136	22
Milton Keynes Dons	2024–25	League Two	4	0	0	0	1	0	2	0	7	0
Career total			120	18	6	0	6	0	18	4	150	22

== Honours ==
Oldham Athletic

- National League play-offs: 2025

Rochdale

- National League play-offs: 2026
