= Ryan Cassidy =

Irish footballer

Personal information
- Full name: Ryan Michael McClean Cassidy
- Date of birth: 2 March 2001 (age 25)
- Place of birth: Dublin, Ireland
- Height: 1.73 m (5 ft 8 in)
- Position: Striker

Team information
- Current team: Hayes & Yeading United

Youth career
- St. Kevin's Boys
- 2017–2020: Watford

Senior career*
Years	Team	Apps	(Gls)
2020–2022	Watford	0	(0)
2020–2021	→ Accrington Stanley (loan)	11	(2)
2022	→ Bohemians (loan)	8	(0)
2023–	Hayes & Yeading United	0	(0)

International career
- Republic of Ireland U17
- Republic of Ireland U18
- Republic of Ireland U19
- * Club domestic league appearances and goals as of 21:16, 14 July 2022 (UTC)

Ryan Michael McClean Cassidy (born 2 March 2001) is an Irish professional footballer who plays as a striker for Hayes & Yeading United.

== Club career ==
Born in Dublin, Cassidy moved from St. Kevin's Boys to Watford in July 2017, and turned professional in 2018.

After signing a new two-year contract with Watford in July 2020, he moved on loan to Accrington Stanley in August 2020. He scored his first goals for Accrington when he scored twice in an EFL Trophy tie against Leeds United U21s on 8 September 2020.

He signed for League of Ireland Premier Division side Bohemians on loan in January 2022.

He left Watford in June 2022 after the expiry of his contract. In February 2023, he joined Southern League Premier Division South club Hayes & Yeading United.

== International career ==
Cassidy has represented Republic of Ireland at under-17, under-18 and under-19 youth levels. He received his first official call up to the under-21 squad on 11 November 2020, in place of the injured Jonathan Afolabi.

== Career statistics ==
As of match played on 23 May 2022

Appearances and goals by club, season and competition
Club	Season	League			National Cup		League Cup		Other		Total	
Club	Season	Division	Apps	Goals	Apps	Goals	Apps	Goals	Apps	Goals	Apps	Goals
Watford	2020–21	EFL Championship	0	0	0	0	0	0	—		0	0
Watford	2021–22	Premier League	0	0	0	0	0	0	—		0	0
Watford	2022–23	EFL Championship	0	0	0	0	0	0	—		0	0
Watford	Total		0	0	0	0	0	0	0	0	0	0
Accrington Stanley (loan)	2020–21	EFL League One	11	2	1	0	1	0	4 (Note: Appearances in the EFL Trophy)	2	17	4
Bohemians (loan)	2022	League of Ireland Premier Division	8	0	—		—		—		8	0
Career total			19	2	1	0	1	0	4	2	25	4
