= Thomas Allan (footballer, born 1999) =

English footballer (born 1999)

Personal information
- Full name: Thomas David Allan
- Date of birth: 23 September 1999 (age 27)
- Place of birth: Newcastle upon Tyne, England
- Height: 5 ft 8 in (1.73 m)
- Position: Forward

Team information
- Current team: Hebburn Town

Youth career
- Cramlington Juniors
- 2012–2020: Newcastle United

Senior career*
| Years | Team | Apps | (Gls) |
| 2020–2022 | Newcastle United | 0 | (0) |
| 2020–2021 | → Accrington Stanley (loan) | 4 | (0) |
| 2021–2022 | → Greenock Morton (loan) | 8 | (0) |
| 2022–2025 | Gateshead | 31 | (1) |
| 2022–2023 | → Spennymoor Town (loan) | 11 | (1) |
| 2024 | → Spennymoor Town (loan) | 5 | (0) |
| 2024–2025 | → South Shields (loan) | 10 | (3) |
| 2025–2026 | Darlington | 20 | (3) |
| 2026– | Hebburn Town | | |
- * Club domestic league appearances and goals as of 13:02, 13 June 2026 (UTC)

Thomas David Allan (born 23 September 1999) is an English professional footballer who plays as a forward for National League North club Hebburn Town.

Newcastle loaned Allan to Accrington Stanley during the first part of the 2020–21 season, and then to Greenock Morton in August 2021, but was recalled in January 2022. He Joined Gateshead in June scoring on his 2nd game against Notts County with the game finishing 1-1. Then in September 2022 he joined Spennymoor Town on loan in a deal due to run to the New Year. Allan scored his first goal for the moors against Brackley Town resulting in a 2-1 Defeat.

== Career statistics ==
As of matches played 4 December 2021

Appearances and goals by club, season and competition
| Club | Season | League | | | National Cup | | League Cup | | Other | | Total | |
| Club | Season | Division | Apps | Goals | Apps | Goals | Apps | Goals | Apps | Goals | Apps | Goals |
|---|---|---|---|---|---|---|---|---|---|---|---|---|
| Newcastle United | 2019–20 | Premier League | 0 | 0 | 1 | 0 | 0 | 0 | 0 | 0 | 1 | 0 |
| Newcastle United | 2020–21 | Premier League | 0 | 0 | 0 | 0 | 0 | 0 | 0 | 0 | 0 | 0 |
| Newcastle United | 2021–22 | Premier League | 0 | 0 | 0 | 0 | 0 | 0 | 0 | 0 | 0 | 0 |
| Newcastle United | Total | | 0 | 0 | 1 | 0 | 0 | 0 | 0 | 0 | 1 | 0 |
| Accrington Stanley (loan) | 2020–21 | League One | 4 | 0 | 1 | 0 | 1 | 0 | 2 | 0 | 8 | 0 |
| Greenock Morton (loan) | 2021–22 | Scottish Championship | 8 | 0 | 0 | 0 | 0 | 0 | 3 (Note: Appearance in the Scottish Challenge Cup) | 0 | 11 | 0 |
| Career total | | | 12 | 0 | 2 | 0 | 1 | 0 | 5 | 0 | 20 | 0 |

== Honours ==
Gateshead

- FA Trophy: 2023–24
