= Dion Charles =

English-Northern Irish footballer (born 1995)

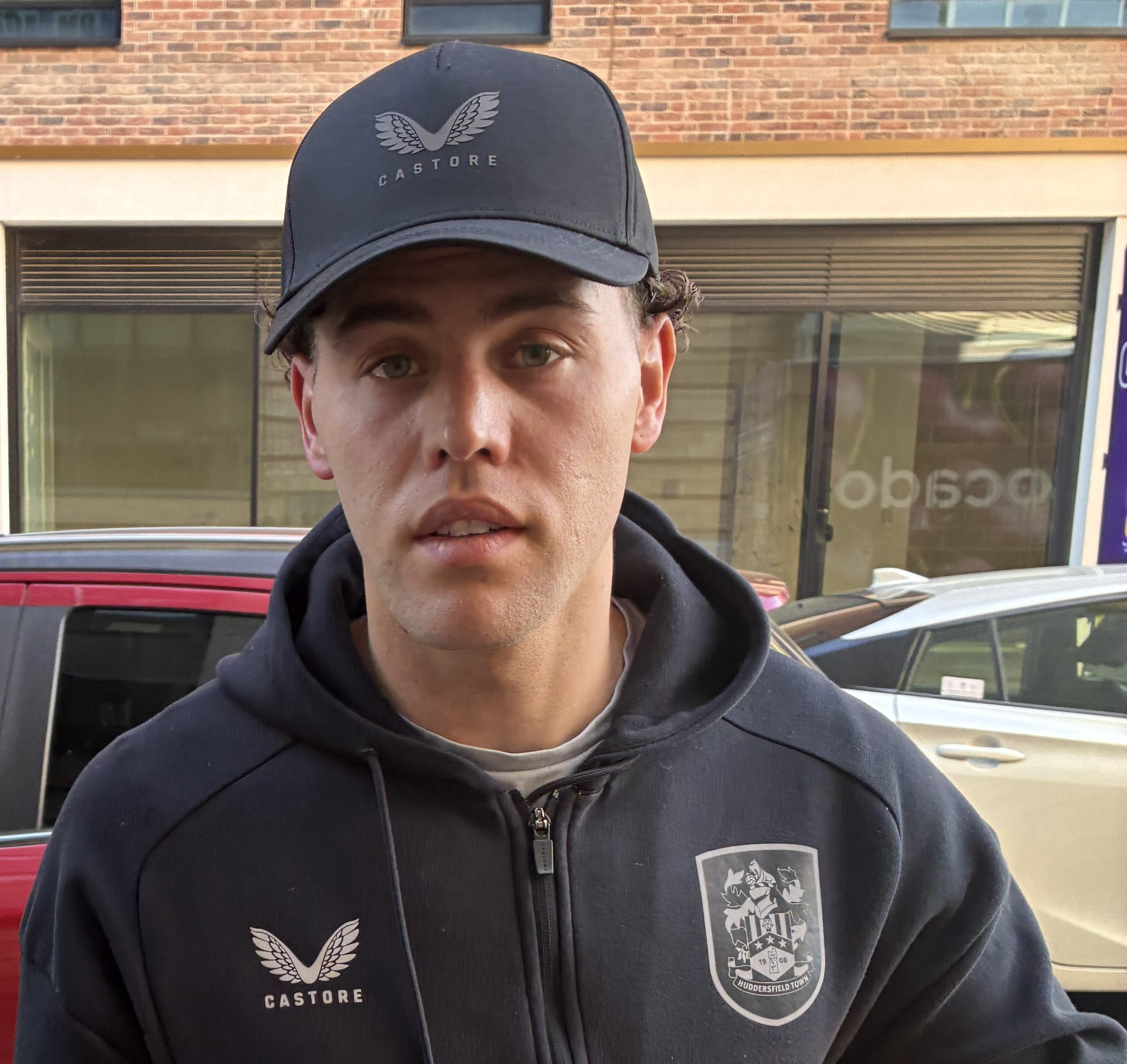
- Charles in 2026

Personal information
- Full name: Dion Elie Raymond Charles
- Date of birth: 7 October 1995 (age 31)
- Place of birth: Preston, England
- Height: 5 ft 10 in (1.78 m)
- Position: Forward

Team information
- Current team: Blackpool (on loan from Huddersfield Town)
- Number: 19

Youth career
- –2013: Blackpool

Senior career*
Years	Team	Apps	(Gls)
2013–2014	Blackpool	0	(0)
2014–2016	AFC Fylde	52	(18)
2014	→ Skelmersdale United (loan)		
2016–2018	Fleetwood Town	0	(0)
2017–2018	→ FC Halifax Town (loan)	19	(3)
2018–2019	Southport	60	(18)
2019–2022	Accrington Stanley	81	(27)
2022–2025	Bolton Wanderers	122	(45)
2025–	Huddersfield Town	47	(2)
2026–	→ Blackpool (loan)	8	(1)

International career^{‡}
2016	Northern Ireland U21	3	(0)
2021–	Northern Ireland	34	(4)
- * Club domestic league appearances and goals as of 11 October 2026 (UTC) ‡ National team caps and goals as of 28 September 2026 (UTC)

Dion Elie Raymond Charles (born 7 October 1995) is a professional footballer who plays as a forward for EFL League One club Blackpool on loan from EFL League One club Huddersfield Town. He plays for the Northern Ireland national team.

== Club career ==
=== Blackpool ===
After rising through the youth ranks at Blackpool, he was named on the bench to face Barnsley during the 2013–14 campaign, remaining unused in the 1–0 victory at Bloomfield Road on 10 August.

=== AFC Fylde ===
After being released by Blackpool, Charles joined Conference North side AFC Fylde following an impressive trial. On 12 August 2014, he made his debut in a 3–0 away defeat against Stalybridge Celtic, replacing Richie Allen in the 80th minute. He scored his first goal in a 5–0 victory over Colwyn Bay 13 days later. He joined Northern Premier League Premier Division side Skelmersdale United on a one-month loan in November.

On 15 August 2015, Charles opened his 2015–16 campaign by scoring both goals in a 2–2 draw against Gainsborough Trinity. In September, he received a call-up for the England C contingency squad. On 23 January 2016, Charles registered his 10th league goal of the season, in a 3–2 home defeat against Worcester City.

=== Fleetwood Town ===
In September 2015, Charles had signed a two-year contract with AFC Fylde. However, in July 2016, Charles joined League One side Fleetwood Town on a two-year deal. Charles' former club AFC Fylde criticised Fleetwood Town, believing he was still contracted to them. However, The Football Association stated they had not received the contract's paperwork from AFC Fylde, which meant that Fleetwood were able to sign him on a free transfer. Fylde chairman David Haythornthwaite branded the situation "unethical", and began a legal challenge to receive compensation for the player. Following an arbitration hearing in June 2017, it was established that Fleetwood were liable to pay compensation to Fylde based on FIFA's Article 17. However, Fleetwood challenged this ruling, alleging the arbitrator breached his statutory duties by failing to disclose emails with the FA during the arbitration process. The challenge succeeded, and the case was referred back for further arbitration.

On 9 November 2016, Charles made his Fleetwood debut in a 4–2 defeat to Carlisle United in the EFL Trophy.

On 18 March 2017, Charles joined National League North side FC Halifax Town on loan until the end of the 2016–17 campaign. On the same day, he made his debut in their 1–0 home defeat against Gloucester City, featuring for 63 minutes before being replaced by Adam Morgan. A week later, he scored his first goal in their 3–0 away victory over FC United of Manchester, netting the opener in the 10th minute. On 22 July, Charles rejoined Halifax Town on a six-month loan. He featured twelve times before returning to Fleetwood in January 2018.

=== Southport ===
On 12 January 2018, Charles joined National League North side Southport for an undisclosed fee.

=== Accrington Stanley ===
On 12 August 2019 Charles joined Accrington Stanley on a two-year deal for an undisclosed fee. He made his debut for the League One team five days later, as a 76th-minute substitute for Courtney Baker-Richardson in a 1–1 draw at AFC Wimbledon. Three days later he made another substitute appearance against Shrewsbury Town, scoring his first goal for the club but failing to prevent a 3–2 home loss. He totalled nine goals in 40 games over all competitions, including the penalty equaliser in a 3–3 draw with ten men at Bristol Rovers on 7 September, and a strike in a 7–1 home win over Bolton Wanderers on 23 November, in which he assisted another goal and won a penalty.

In 2020–21, Charles was League One's joint fifth top scorer with 19 goals, as Stanley came 11th. This included a hat-trick on 2 February 2021 in a 6–1 home win over Bristol Rovers.

However, in the 2021–22 season Charles was limited to just six league appearances for Stanley after his refusal to sign a new contract with the club led to a dispute with manager John Coleman.

=== Bolton Wanderers ===
On 1 January 2022, Charles joined fellow League One side Bolton Wanderers on a three-and-a-half-year deal for an undisclosed fee reported to be £320,000. It was the first time since Wanderers signed Charles' international teammate Josh Magennis in 2018 that the club had paid a transfer fee for a player. On 11 February 2023, in Bolton's 5000th league game, he scored a hat-trick in a 5–0 win against Peterborough United. On 2 April, he started in the 2023 EFL Trophy Final. He scored the second goal, with the Final against Plymouth Argyle eventually ending with a 4–0 Bolton win. He scored 21 goals during the 2022–23 season, which was the most for a Bolton player in one season in 22 years. On 28 August 2023, he signed a new contract until 2026.

=== Huddersfield Town ===
On 15 January 2025, Charles joined Huddersfield Town for an undisclosed fee on a two-and-a-half-year deal. The Bolton News reported they paid £750,000.

On 27 June 2026, Charles joined Blackpool on loan for the 2026–27 season.

== International career ==
In March 2021, Charles was called up to the Northern Ireland senior team for the first time for the 2022 World Cup Qualifiers. He debuted in a friendly 2–1 loss to the United States on 28 March 2021. He scored his first international goals in a victory away to San Marino in March 2023.

== Career statistics ==
As of match played 18 April 2026

Appearances and goals by club, season and competition
Club	Season	League			FA Cup		League Cup		Other		Total	
Club	Season	Division	Apps	Goals	Apps	Goals	Apps	Goals	Apps	Goals	Apps	Goals
Blackpool	2013–14	Championship	0	0	0	0	0	0	—		0	0
AFC Fylde	2014–15	National League North	12	4	0	0	—		0	0	12	4
AFC Fylde	2015–16	National League North	40	14	4	2	—		8 (Note: Five appearances in FA Trophy, three in National League North play-offs)	0	52	16
AFC Fylde	Total		52	18	4	2	—		8	0	64	20
Fleetwood Town	2016–17	League One	0	0	0	0	0	0	1 (Note: Appearance(s) in the Football League Trophy)	0	1	0
FC Halifax Town (loan)	2016–17	National League North	8	3	—		—		2 (Note: Appearances in National League North play-offs)	0	10	3
FC Halifax Town (loan)	2017–18	National League	11	0	1	0	—		—		12	0
FC Halifax Town (loan)	Total		19	3	1	0	—		2	0	22	3
Southport	2017–18	National League North	17	4	—		—		—		17	4
Southport	2018–19	National League North	41	14	6	2	—		2 (Note: Appearance(s) in the FA Trophy)	0	49	16
Southport	2019–20	National League North	2	0	—		—		—		2	0
Southport	Total		60	18	6	2	—		2	0	68	20
Accrington Stanley	2019–20	League One	33	8	1	0	0	0	6	1	40	9
Accrington Stanley	2020–21	League One	42	19	1	0	1	0	5	1	49	20
Accrington Stanley	2021–22	League One	6	0	0	0	2	1	0	0	8	1
Accrington Stanley	Total		81	27	2	0	3	1	11	2	97	30
Bolton Wanderers	2021–22	League One	23	8	—		—		1	0	24	8
Bolton Wanderers	2022–23	League One	42	16	1	0	1	1	8 (Note: Six appearances in the EFL Trophy, two appearances in the League One play-offs)	4	52	21
Bolton Wanderers	2023–24	League One	33	14	4	2	2	1	5 (Note: Two appearances in EFL Trophy, three appearances in League One play-offs)	3	44	20
Bolton Wanderers	2024–25	League One	24	7	1	0	3	1	1	0	29	8
Bolton Wanderers	Total		122	45	6	2	6	3	15	7	149	57
Huddersfield Town	2024–25	League One	18	0	—		—		—		18	0
Huddersfield Town	2025–26	League One	29	2	1	0	3	0	4	2	37	4
Huddersfield Town	Total		47	2	1	0	3	0	4	2	55	4
Career total			381	113	20	6	12	4	43	11	456	134

=== International ===
As of match played 28 September 2026

Appearances and goals by national team and year
National team	Year	Apps	Goals
Northern Ireland	2021	6	0
Northern Ireland	2022	7	0
Northern Ireland	2023	9	3
Northern Ireland	2024	6	1
Northern Ireland	2025	5	0
Northern Ireland	2026	1	0
Total		34	4

Scores and results list Northern Ireland's goal tally first, score column indicates score after each Charles goal.

List of international goals scored by Dion Charles
No.	Date	Venue	Opponent	Score	Result	Competition
1	23 March 2023	San Marino Stadium, Serravalle, San Marino	San Marino	1–0	2–0	UEFA Euro 2024 qualifying
2	23 March 2023	San Marino Stadium, Serravalle, San Marino	San Marino	2–0	2–0	UEFA Euro 2024 qualifying
3	20 November 2023	Windsor Park, Belfast, Northern Ireland	Denmark	2–0	2–0	UEFA Euro 2024 qualifying
4	15 November 2024	Windsor Park, Belfast, Northern Ireland	Belarus	2–0	2–0	2024–25 UEFA Nations League C

== Honours ==
Bolton Wanderers

- EFL Trophy: 2022–23
