= David Morgan (Northern Irish footballer) =

Northern Irish association football player (born 1994)

Personal information
- Full name: David Barry Morgan
- Date of birth: 4 July 1994 (age 32)
- Place of birth: Belfast, Northern Ireland
- Position: Midfielder

Team information
- Current team: Warrington Town

Youth career
- –2008: Ards
- 2008–2012: Nottingham Forest

Senior career*
| Years | Team | Apps | (Gls) |
| 2012–2014 | Nottingham Forest | 0 | (0) |
| 2012 | → Lincoln City (loan) | 8 | (0) |
| 2013 | → Dundee (loan) | 1 | (0) |
| 2013–2014 | → Tamworth (loan) | 9 | (1) |
| 2014–2015 | Ilkeston | 40 | (2) |
| 2015–2017 | Nuneaton Town | 66 | (3) |
| 2017 | AFC Fylde | 8 | (0) |
| 2017 | Harrogate Town | 2 | (0) |
| 2017–2021 | Southport | 108 | (19) |
| 2021–2023 | Accrington Stanley | 30 | (0) |
| 2023–2025 | Southport | 67 | (3) |
| 2025– | Warrington Town | 0 | (0) |

International career
| 2010–2011 | Northern Ireland U17 | 5 | (2) |
| 2011–2014 | Northern Ireland U19 | 4 | (0) |
| 2012–2013 | Northern Ireland U21 | 4 | (4) |

Managerial career
- 2025: Southport (caretaker)
- * Club domestic league appearances and goals as of 16:35, 7 July 2025 (UTC)

David Barry Morgan (born 4 July 1994) is a Northern Irish professional footballer who plays as a midfielder for Northern Premier League Premier Division club Warrington Town.

== Club career ==
Morgan joined Nottingham Forest aged fourteen from Northern Irish club Ards. He was scouted playing in the prestigious Milk Cup Youth Tournament. He played with the Forest youth team for four years, before making a 28-day loan move to Lincoln City on 14 September 2012. He made his debut on 15 September 2012 in a 3–2 victory over Hyde, where he entered the game as an 85th-minute substitute. Morgan joined Scottish Premier League club Dundee on 31 January 2013. He made one appearance, coming on as a substitute for Nicky Riley in a 5–0 defeat by Celtic. Morgan later joined Conference Premier club Tamworth on 25 October 2013.

After his release from Nottingham Forest, Morgan signed with Northern Premier League club Ilkeston on 13 August 2014. On 2 March 2017, Morgan joined AFC Fylde for an undisclosed five-figure sum.

On 9 September 2017, Morgan signed for Harrogate Town. It was then announced after only three appearances for Harrogate that he would sign for Southport on 22 September 2017.

On 1 February 2021, Morgan joined League One side Accrington Stanley for an undisclosed fee. On 31 July 2023, Morgan left the club.

On 3 August 2023, Morgan made a return to Southport upon the mutual termination of his contract at Accrington.

In July 2025, Morgan joined Northern Premier League Premier Division side Warrington Town.

== Coaching career ==
On 12 March 2025, Morgan was appointed caretaker manager of Southport following the sacking of Jim Bentley.

== Personal life ==
Morgan graduated from Staffordshire University in 2016 with a first-class bachelor's degree in Professional Sports Writing and Broadcasting.

== Career statistics ==
As of end of 2024–25 season

Appearances and goals by club, season and competition
| Club | Season | League | | | National Cup | | League Cup | | Other | | Total | |
| Club | Season | Division | Apps | Goals | Apps | Goals | Apps | Goals | Apps | Goals | Apps | Goals |
|---|---|---|---|---|---|---|---|---|---|---|---|---|
| Nottingham Forest | 2012–13 | Championship | 0 | 0 | 0 | 0 | 0 | 0 | — | | 0 | 0 |
| Nottingham Forest | 2013–14 | Championship | 0 | 0 | 0 | 0 | 0 | 0 | — | | 0 | 0 |
| Nottingham Forest | Total | | 0 | 0 | 0 | 0 | 0 | 0 | — | | 0 | 0 |
| Lincoln City (loan) | 2012–13 | Conference Premier | 8 | 0 | 1 | 0 | — | | 1 (Note: Appearance(s) in FA Trophy) | 0 | 10 | 0 |
| Dundee (loan) | 2012–13 | Scottish Premier League | 1 | 0 | 0 | 0 | 0 | 0 | — | | 1 | 0 |
| Tamworth (loan) | 2013–14 | Conference Premier | 9 | 1 | 3 | 0 | — | | 2 | 0 | 14 | 1 |
| Ilkeston | 2014–15 | Northern Premier League Premier Division | 40 | 2 | 3 | 0 | — | | 7 (Note: One appearance in FA Trophy; two appearances one goal in Northern Premier League Challenge Cup; two appearances in Derbyshire Senior Cup; two appearances in Northern Premier League Premier Division play-offs) | 1 | 50 | 3 |
| Nuneaton Town | 2015–16 | National League North | 38 | 2 | 2 | 0 | — | | 4 (Note: Two appearances in FA Trophy; two appearances in Birmingham Senior Cup) | 0 | 44 | 2 |
| Nuneaton Town | 2016–17 | National League North | 28 | 1 | 0 | 0 | — | | 3 | 1 | 31 | 2 |
| Nuneaton Town | Total | | 66 | 3 | 2 | 0 | — | | 7 | 1 | 75 | 4 |
| AFC Fylde | 2016–17 | National League North | 8 | 0 | 0 | 0 | — | | 0 | 0 | 8 | 0 |
| Harrogate Town | 2017–18 | National League North | 2 | 0 | 0 | 0 | — | | 0 | 0 | 2 | 0 |
| Southport | 2017–18 | National League North | 25 | 2 | 0 | 0 | — | | 1 | 0 | 26 | 2 |
| Southport | 2018–19 | National League North | 39 | 5 | 6 | 0 | — | | 7 (Note: Two appearances one goal in FA Trophy; three appearances in Lancashire Junior Cup; two appearances in Liverpool Senior Cup) | 1 | 52 | 6 |
| Southport | 2019–20 | National League North | 30 | 11 | 3 | 1 | — | | 6 (Note: Four appearances one goal in FA Trophy; two appearances in Liverpool Senior Cup) | 1 | 39 | 13 |
| Southport | 2020–21 | National League North | 14 | 1 | 2 | 0 | — | | 3 | 0 | 19 | 1 |
| Southport | Total | | 108 | 19 | 11 | 1 | — | | 17 | 2 | 136 | 22 |
| Accrington Stanley | 2020–21 | League One | 16 | 0 | 0 | 0 | 0 | 0 | 0 | 0 | 16 | 0 |
| Accrington Stanley | 2021–22 | League One | 14 | 0 | 1 | 0 | 2 | 0 | 1 (Note: Appearance(s) in Football League Trophy) | 0 | 18 | 0 |
| Accrington Stanley | 2022–23 | League One | 0 | 0 | 0 | 0 | 0 | 0 | 0 | 0 | 0 | 0 |
| Accrington Stanley | Total | | 30 | 0 | 1 | 0 | 2 | 0 | 1 | 0 | 34 | 0 |
| Southport | 2023–24 | National League North | 36 | 0 | 1 | 0 | — | | 2 | 0 | 39 | 0 |
| Southport | 2024–25 | National League North | 31 | 3 | 2 | 0 | — | | 3 | 0 | 36 | 3 |
| Southport | Total | | 67 | 3 | 3 | 0 | 0 | 0 | 5 | 0 | 75 | 3 |
| Career total | | | 339 | 28 | 24 | 1 | 2 | 0 | 40 | 4 | 405 | 33 |
