= 2023 EFL play-offs =

English Football League play-offs
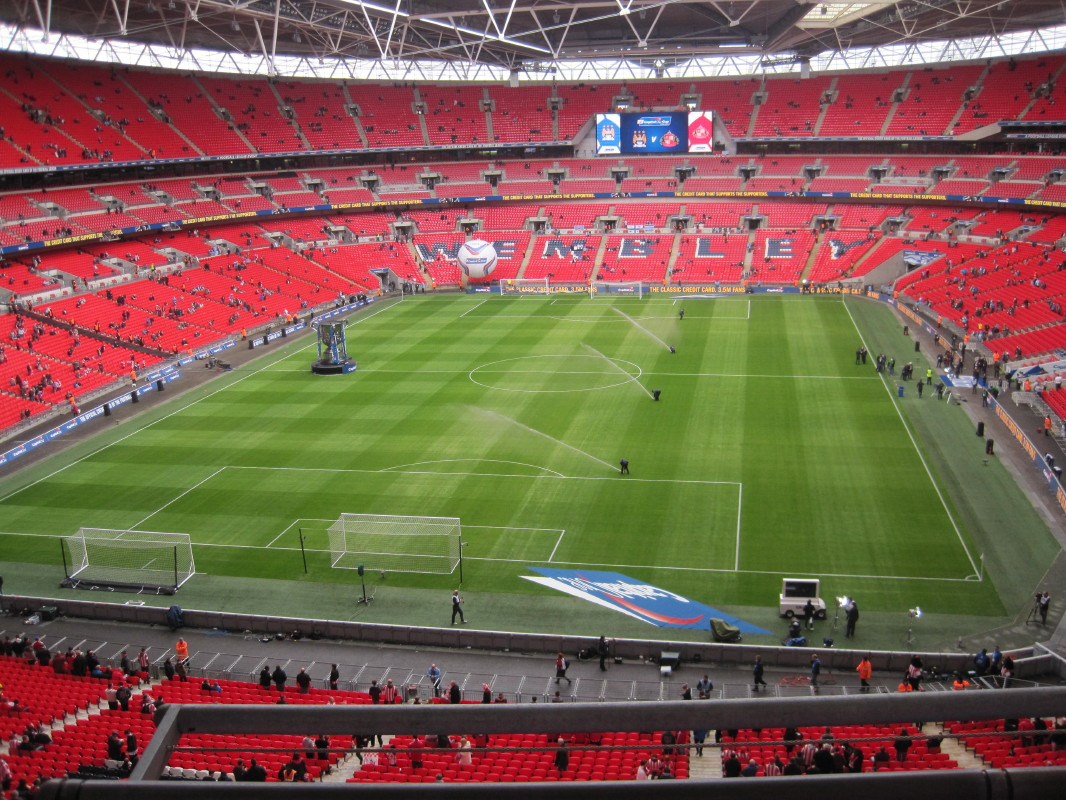
- Wembley Stadium was the venue for each play-off final
- Season: 2022–23

The English Football League play-offs for the 2022–23 season (referred to as the Sky Bet Play-Offs for sponsorship reasons) were held in May 2023 with all finals being staged at Wembley Stadium in Wembley.

The play-offs begin in each league with two semi-finals which are played over two legs. The teams who finished in 3rd, 4th, 5th and 6th place in the Championship and League One and the 4th, 5th, 6th and 7th-placed teams in League Two compete. The winners of the semi-finals advance to the finals, with the winners gaining promotion for the following season.

== Background ==
The English Football League play-offs have been held every year since 1987. They take place for each division following the conclusion of the regular season and are contested by the four clubs finishing below the automatic promotion places. The fixtures are determined by final league position – in the Championship and League One this is 3rd v 6th and 4th v 5th, while in League Two it is 4th v 7th and 5th v 6th.

== Championship ==
=== Championship semi-finals ===
The final table was confirmed after the final matchday on 8 May 2023. Going into the final day, Luton Town and Middlesbrough had already confirmed their places in their play-offs, finishing 3rd and 4th respectively. Coventry City started and finished the day in 5th with a draw over Middlesbrough being enough to ensure both teams would face each other in the semi-finals. Millwall started the day in 6th, but Sunderland, West Bromwich Albion, and Blackburn Rovers all remained in the hunt for the last spot at the start of play. West Bromwich Albion missed out after a loss against Swansea City. Millwall fell to 8th as they lost against fellow hopefuls Blackburn Rovers who also missed out in 7th on goal difference. Sunderland's win against Preston North End meant that they secured 6th spot and face Luton Town in the semi-finals, giving themselves the chance to be promoted via the play-offs for the second season in a row after they won the 2022 League One play-off final last season.

Final league position - Championship
Pos	Team	Pld	W	D	L	GF	GA	GD	Pts
3	Luton Town	46	21	17	8	57	39	+18	80
4	Middlesbrough	46	22	9	15	84	56	+28	75
5	Coventry City	46	18	16	12	58	46	+12	70
6	Sunderland	46	18	15	13	68	55	+13	69

First leg

13 May 2023
17:30 BST

Sunderland	2–1	Luton Town
Amad 39'; Hume 63'	Report	Adebayo 11'

Stadium of Light, Sunderland
Attendance: 46,060
Referee: Tim Robinson
14 May 2023
12:00 BST

Coventry City	0–0	Middlesbrough
	Report

Coventry Building Society Arena, Coventry
Attendance: 28,874
Referee: Bobby Madley

Second leg

16 May 2023
20:00 BST

Luton Town	2–0	Sunderland
Osho 10'; Lockyer 43'	Report

Kenilworth Road, Luton
Attendance: 10,013
Referee: Simon Hooper

Luton Town won 3–2 on aggregate.

17 May 2023
20:00 BST

Middlesbrough	0–1	Coventry City
	Report	Hamer 57'

Riverside Stadium, Middlesbrough
Attendance: 32,154
Referee: David Coote

Coventry City won 1-0 on aggregate.

=== Championship final ===
Luton Town were promoted to the Premier League and played there alongside automatically promoted teams Burnley and Sheffield United.

27 May 2023
16:45 BST

Coventry City	1–1 (a.e.t.)	Luton Town
Hamer 66'	Report	Clark 23'
Penalties
Godden (penalty scored); Gyökeres (penalty scored); Sheaf (penalty scored); Eccles (penalty scored); Kelly (penalty scored); Dabo (penalty missed)	5–6	(penalty scored) Morris; (penalty scored) Taylor; (penalty scored) Nakamba; (penalty scored) Clark; (penalty scored) Berry; (penalty scored) Potts

Wembley Stadium, London
Attendance: 85,711
Referee: Michael Oliver

== League One ==
=== League One Semi-Finals ===
The final table was confirmed after the final matchday on 7 May 2023. Going into the final day, Sheffield Wednesday and Barnsley had already guaranteed a place in the play-offs, finishing 3rd and 4th respectively. Bolton Wanderers had also guaranteed their place in the play-offs and won their game against Bristol Rovers to finish 5th, ensuring they played Barnsley in the semi-finals. Derby County were 6th with only a win being able to guarantee a play-off spot with any other result opening the door for Peterborough United, who needed to win. Peterborough United beat Barnsley, while Derby County lost to Sheffield Wednesday. This meant that Peterborough United finished 6th and faced Sheffield Wednesday in the semi-finals, while Derby County finished 7th.

Final league position - League One
Pos	Team	Pld	W	D	L	GF	GA	GD	Pts
3	Sheffield Wednesday	46	28	12	6	81	37	+44	96
4	Barnsley	46	26	8	12	80	47	+33	86
5	Bolton Wanderers	46	23	12	11	62	36	+26	81
6	Peterborough United	46	24	5	17	75	54	+21	77

First leg

12 May 2023
20:00 BST

Peterborough United	4–0	Sheffield Wednesday
Taylor 20'; Ward 36'; Poku 50'; Clarke-Harris 82'	Report

Weston Homes Stadium, Peterborough
Attendance: 12,569
Referee: Anthony Backhouse
13 May 2023
15:00 BST

Bolton Wanderers	1–1	Barnsley
Charles 67'	Report	Cadden 63'

University of Bolton Stadium, Horwich
Attendance: 23,450
Referee: Andrew Kitchen

Second leg

18 May 2023
20:00 BST

Sheffield Wednesday	5–1 (a.e.t.)	Peterborough United
Smith 9' (pen.); Gregory 25'; James 71'; Palmer 90+8'; Paterson 112'	Report	Gregory 105' (o.g.)
Penalties
Smith (penalty scored); Vaulks (penalty scored); Bannan (penalty scored); Windass (penalty scored); Hunt (penalty scored)	5–3	(penalty scored) Clarke-Harris; (penalty missed) Butler; (penalty scored) Norburn; (penalty scored) Tshimanga

Hillsborough Stadium, Sheffield
Attendance: 31,835
Referee: David Webb

5–5 on aggregate. Sheffield Wednesday won 5–3 on penalties.

19 May 2023
20:00

Barnsley	1–0	Bolton Wanderers
Kitching 24'	Report

Oakwell Stadium, Barnsley
Attendance: 16,274
Referee: Michael Salisbury

Barnsley won 2–1 on aggregate.

=== League One Final ===
Sheffield Wednesday won this match and as a result joined Plymouth Argyle and Ipswich Town in being promoted to the EFL Championship to play in the 2023–24 EFL Championship season.

29 May 2023
15:00 BST

Barnsley	0–1 (a.e.t.)	Sheffield Wednesday
		Windass 120+3'

Wembley Stadium, London
Attendance: 72,492
Referee: Tim Robinson

== League Two ==
=== League Two Semi-Finals ===
The final table was confirmed after the final matchday on 8 May 2023. Going into the final day, Stockport County had already secured a play-off place and could still have finished 3rd if they had won and Northampton Town failed to win in the last game of the season, due to Stockport County's superior goal difference. However, Northampton Town won against Tranmere Rovers on the final day, consigning Stockport to 4th. They subsequently drew with the already relegated Hartlepool United. Carlisle United, Salford City, and Bradford City all had 75 points on the final day with Mansfield Town still in with a chance of displacing any of them on the final day of the season should they win and one of the other 3 teams lose in enough of a goal swing. Carlisle United and Bradford City managed to secure draws with Sutton United and champions Leyton Orient respectively to secure their places. Carlisle United finished 5th due to their superior goal difference over Bradford City in 6th. However, Salford City lost 1–0 to Gillingham but just managed to secure 7th as Mansfield Town only won 2–0 against Colchester United and needed to score 1 more goal to surpass Salford City. The results ensured that Stockport County played Salford City and Carlisle United played Bradford City over 2 legs respectively.

Final league position - League Two
Pos	Team	Pld	W	D	L	GF	GA	GD	Pts
4	Stockport County	46	22	13	11	65	37	+28	79
5	Carlisle United	46	20	16	10	66	43	+23	76
6	Bradford City	46	20	16	10	61	43	+18	76
7	Salford City	46	22	9	15	72	54	+18	75

First leg

13 May 2023
19:45 BST

Salford City	1–0	Stockport County
Smith 17'	Report

Moor Lane, Salford
Attendance: 3,923
Referee: Tom Nield
14 May 2023
19:00 BST

Bradford City	1–0	Carlisle United
Walker 18'	Report

Valley Parade, Bradford
Attendance: 20,575
Referee: Ross Joyce

Second leg

20 May 2023
12:30 BST

Stockport County	2–1 (a.e.t.)	Salford City
Olaofe 68'; Stretton 115'	Report	Mallan 112'
Penalties
Madden (penalty scored); Croasdale (penalty missed); Collar (penalty scored); Sarcevic (penalty scored)	3–1	(penalty missed) Lund; (penalty missed) Mariappa; (penalty scored) Barry; (penalty missed) Mallan

Edgeley Park, Stockport
Attendance: 10,023
Referee: Ben Toner

2–2 on Aggregate. Stockport County won 3–1 on penalties.

20 May 2023
15:00 BST

Carlisle United	3–1 (a.e.t.)	Bradford City
Halliday 21' (o.g.); Guy 98'; Barclay 112'	Report	Derbyshire 106'

Brunton Park, Carlisle
Attendance: 15,401
Referee: Simon Mather

Carlisle United won 3–2 on aggregate.

=== League Two Final ===
Carlisle United are promoted to EFL League One and will play in the 2023–24 EFL League One season with promoted Leyton Orient, Stevenage and Northampton Town.

28 May 2023
13:30 BST

Stockport County	1–1 (a.e.t.)	Carlisle United
Mellish 34' (o.g.)	Report	Patrick 84'
Penalties
Lemonheigh-Evans (penalty scored); Rydel (penalty missed); Hippolyte (penalty scored); Stretton (penalty scored); Collar (penalty scored)	4–5	(penalty scored) Dennis; (penalty scored) Mellish; (penalty scored) Edmondson; (penalty scored) Moxon; (penalty scored) Charters

Wembley Stadium, London
Attendance: 34,004
Referee: Tom Nield
