= Stuart Burgess =

Scottish footballer

Personal information
- Date of birth: 22 October 1962 (age 64)
- Place of birth: Broxburn, Scotland
- Position: Defender

Youth career
- ????–1980: Bathgate Thistle

Senior career*
Years	Team	Apps	(Gls)
1980–1984	Albion Rovers	125	(12)
1984–1987	East Fife	99	(24)
1987–1990	Falkirk	107	(18)
1990–1992	Kilmarnock	17	(0)
1992–1993	East Fife	21	(0)
- * Club domestic league appearances and goals

Stuart Burgess (born 22 October 1962) is a Scottish professional footballer who played as a central defender. He played in the Scottish Premier Division with Falkirk. During his career, he played for four clubs, making more than 350 league appearances.

Now living in Perth, Australia. Stuart has a son named Cameron, who has played for Fulham and Ross County.
