= Cameron Burgess =

Australian soccer player (born 1995)

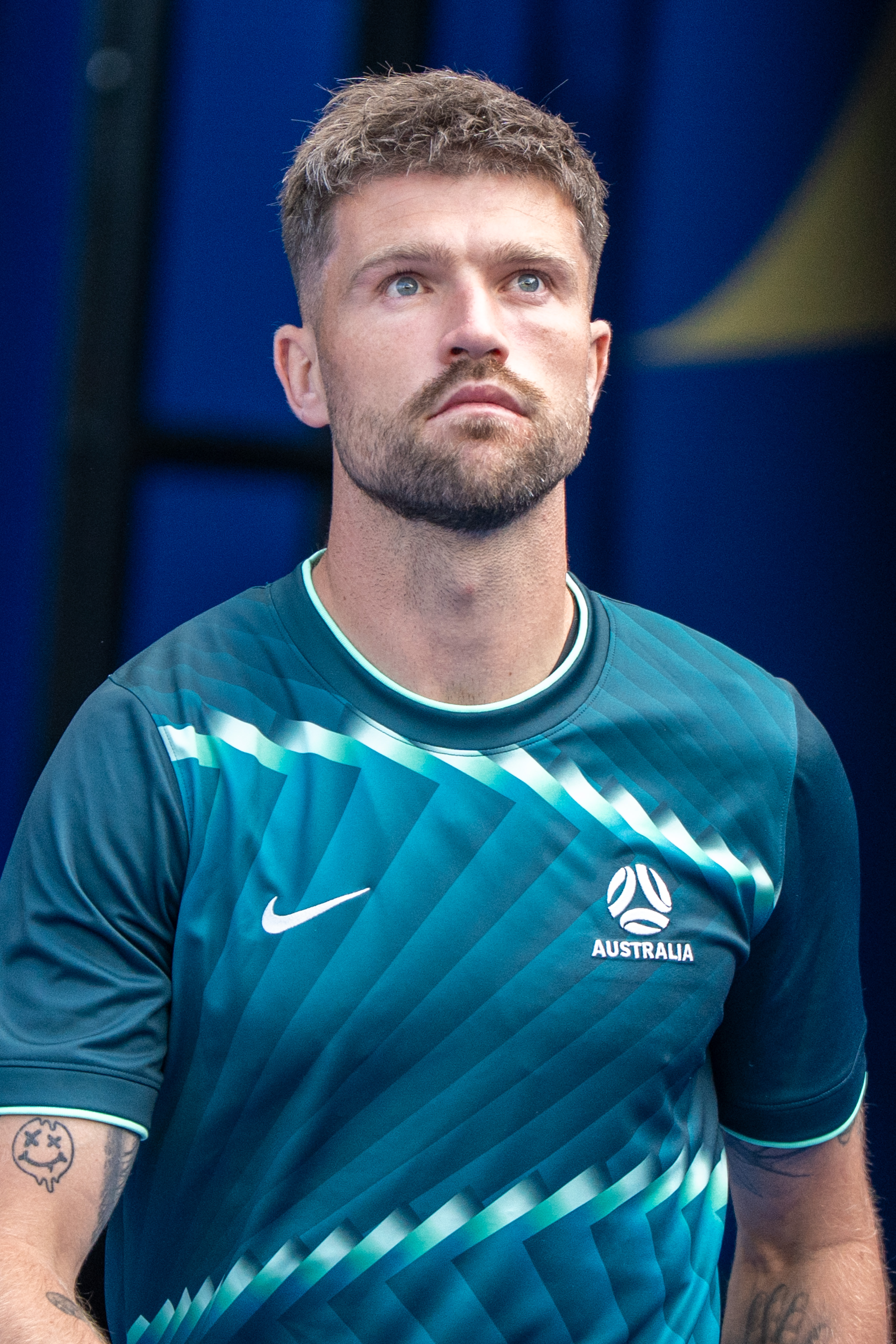
- Burgess with Australia in 2026

Personal information
- Full name: Cameron Robert Burgess
- Date of birth: 21 October 1995 (age 31)
- Place of birth: Aberdeen, Scotland
- Height: 1.94 m (6 ft 4 in)
- Position: Centre-back

Team information
- Current team: Swansea City
- Number: 15

Youth career
- –2006: Portlethen Sports Club
- 2006–2011: ECU Joondalup
- 2011–2014: Fulham

Senior career*
Years	Team	Apps	(Gls)
2014–2017	Fulham	4	(0)
2015	→ Ross County (loan)	0	(0)
2015-2016	→ Cheltenham Town (loan)	17	(0)
2016–2017	→ Oldham Athletic (loan)	23	(1)
2017	→ Bury (loan)	18	(0)
2017–2020	Scunthorpe United	61	(3)
2019–2020	→ Salford City (loan)	29	(2)
2020–2021	Accrington Stanley	45	(3)
2021–2025	Ipswich Town	111	(4)
2025–	Swansea City	46	(0)

International career^{‡}
2013	Scotland U18	1	(0)
2013–2014	Scotland U19	3	(0)
2014	Australia U20	3	(0)
2014–2016	Australia U23	7	(0)
2023–	Australia	29	(0)
- * Club domestic league appearances and goals as of 22:48, 2 May 2026 (UTC) ‡ National team caps and goals as of 19 June 2026

Cameron Robert Burgess (born 21 October 1995) is a professional soccer player who plays as a centre-back for EFL Championship club Swansea City. Born in Scotland, he represents the Australia national team.

== Early life ==
Originally from Portlethen in Aberdeenshire. Burgess's grandfather is Scottish retired international footballer Campbell Forsyth. His father, Stuart Burgess, was also a professional player. His family emigrated from Scotland to Perth, Australia when he was 11 years old.

== Club career ==
=== Fulham and loans ===
Burgess joined the Fulham Academy in 2011 from ECU Joondalup and signed a professional contract with the club in July 2013. He made his first team debut for Fulham, in a 2–1 away loss in the opening match of the 2014–15 Championship season on 9 August 2014 against Ipswich Town at Portman Road.

On 15 January 2015, Burgess signed a contract extension with Fulham until June 2017, with an option for another year, and on the same day signed on loan for Scottish Premiership club Ross County until the end of the 2014–15 season.

Burgess joined Cheltenham Town of the National League on loan on 26 January 2016 for the remainder of the 2015–16 season.

On 18 July 2016, Burgess joined League One club Oldham Athletic on a six-month loan deal. He made his debut on 6 August 2016 in a 3–0 loss to Millwall. He scored his first goal for Oldham in a 1–1 draw with Oxford United on 10 December 2016.

On 6 January 2017, he moved to Bury on loan for six months.

=== Scunthorpe United ===
On 6 June 2017, Burgess joined Scunthorpe United on a three-year contract. He scored his first goal for the club in a 0–3 away win over Northampton Town.

On 24 July 2019 he joined Salford City on a season-long loan.

=== Accrington Stanley ===
On 3 August 2020 he joined Accrington Stanley on a 3-year deal. He scored on his debut for Accrington in an EFL Cup tie against Burton Albion. He also scored on his second appearance in an EFL Trophy tie against Leeds United U21s.

=== Ipswich Town ===
On 15 August 2021, Burgess joined EFL League One club Ipswich Town on a three-year contract for an undisclosed fee, with the contract having the option for an additional one-year extension. He made his debut for Ipswich two days later in a 1–2 away loss against former loan club Cheltenham Town.

The draw with Watford was Burgess' 101st appearance for the Blues after the East Anglian derby at Carrow Road earned him a spot in the club's 100 club.On his achievement, he said: "It's a privilege to be able to play 100 games for this football club, in front of these fans. Everytime you get the chance to play at Portman Road it's a special occasion."

On 3 June 2024, Ipswich said they had extended the player's contract by a year.

=== Swansea City ===
On 14 June 2025, Burgess agreed to join Championship side Swansea City on a three-year contract. Upon joining the club, he was given a number fifteen shirt.

Burgess made his Swansea City's debut, starting the whole game, in a 1–0 loss against Middlesbrough in the opening game of the season. In a follow-up match, he captained for the club for the first time against Crawley Town in the first round of the League Cup and led to a 3–1 win.

On 17 September 2025, Burgess scored twice in Swansea City’s 3–2 victory over Nottingham Forest in the Carabao Cup third round. He began the comeback with Swansea’s first goal and later secured the win with a stoppage-time strike, sending the club into the last 16. On 8 November 2025, Burgess scored two own goals in a 4–1 home loss against his former club Ipswich Town. He later apologised to Swansea fans on social media for his part in the team's poor performance.

== International career ==
=== Scotland ===
Burgess played for Scotland at under-18 and under-19 levels and took part in the 2014 UEFA European Under-19 Championship qualification campaign, playing the full game against Latvia in a 1–1 draw.

=== Australia ===
In September 2014 Burgess switched his allegiance permanently to Australia. He was named in the Australia squad for the 2014 AFC U-19 Championship held in Myanmar.

16 March 2015, Burgess was selected as one of twelve overseas based players in a squad of twenty three by head-coach, Aurelio Vidmar, to take part in the Australian Olyroos' qualification campaign on the road to Brazil 2016 Olympic Games. The first stage of qualification began in a tournament held in Kaohsiung City, Taiwan, against minnows Hong Kong, Myanmar and hosts Taiwan. The Olyroos progressed past this qualification tournament to qualify for the AFC U-23 Championship, which doubles as the final qualification round for the AFC for the Olympics. On 23 December 2015, Burgess was again selected by Vidmar to form part of the Olyroos squad for the 2016 AFC U-23 Championship held in Doha, Qatar between 14 and 30 January 2016.

Burgess was first selected for the full Australia squad in September 2023. His debut came in a friendly against Mexico where he played a full game as centre-back, giving away a penalty-kick in the second-half of a 2–2 draw at Arlington, Texas.

On 31 May 2026, Burgess was selected in the 26-man squad for the 2026 FIFA World Cup.

== Career statistics ==
=== Club ===
As of match played 19 December 2025

Appearances and goals by club, season and competition
Club	Season	League			National cup (Note: Includes FA Cup)		League cup (Note: Includes EFL Cup)		Other		Total	
Club	Season	Division	Apps	Goals	Apps	Goals	Apps	Goals	Apps	Goals	Apps	Goals
Fulham	2014–15	Championship	4	0	0	0	0	0	—		4	0
Fulham	2015–16	Championship	0	0	0	0	0	0	—		0	0
Fulham	2016–17	Championship	0	0	0	0	0	0	0	0	0	0
Fulham	Total		4	0	0	0	0	0	0	0	4	0
Ross County (loan)	2014–15	Scottish Premiership	0	0	—		—		—		0	0
Cheltenham Town (loan)	2015–16	National League	17	0	0	0	—		0	0	17	0
Oldham Athletic (loan)	2016–17	League One	23	1	2	0	2	0	4 (Note: Appearances in EFL Trophy)	1	31	2
Bury (loan)	2016–17	League One	18	0	—		—		—		18	0
Scunthorpe United	2017–18	League One	25	2	3	0	1	0	4	0	33	2
Scunthorpe United	2018–19	League One	36	1	2	0	0	0	2	0	40	1
Scunthorpe United	2019–20	League Two	0	0	0	0	0	0	0	0	0	0
Scunthorpe United	Total		61	3	5	0	1	0	6	0	73	3
Salford City (loan)	2019–20	League Two	29	2	2	0	0	0	4	2	35	4
Accrington Stanley	2020–21	League One	44	3	1	0	1	1	4	2	50	6
Accrington Stanley	2021–22	League One	1	0	0	0	1	0	0	0	2	0
Accrington Stanley	Total		45	3	1	0	2	1	4	2	52	6
Ipswich Town	2021–22	League One	21	0	4	0	—		2	0	27	0
Ipswich Town	2022–23	League One	33	2	2	0	1	0	2	1	38	3
Ipswich Town	2023–24	Championship	39	2	0	0	1	0	—		40	2
Ipswich Town	2024–25	Premier League	18	0	3	0	1	0	—		22	0
Ipswich Town	Total		111	4	9	0	3	0	4	1	127	5
Swansea City	2025–26	Championship	22	0	0	0	4	2	—		26	2
Career total			330	13	19	0	12	3	23	6	383	22

=== International ===
As of match played 19 June 2026

Appearances and goals by national team and year
National team	Year	Apps	Goals
Australia	2023	3	0
Australia	2024	10	0
Australia	2025	10	0
Australia	2026	6	0
Total		29	0

== Honours ==
Cheltenham Town

- National League: 2015–16

Salford City

- EFL Trophy: 2019–20

== See also ==
- List of foreign Football League Championship players
- List of foreign Premier League players
- List of Fulham F.C. players (1–24 appearances)
- List of Scottish football families
