= Stephen Sama =

Association football player

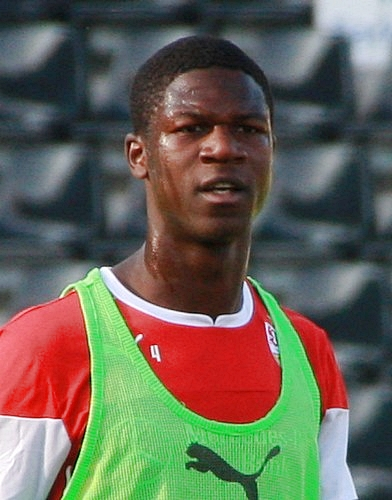
- Sama in 2014

Personal information
- Full name: Stephen Sama
- Date of birth: 5 March 1993 (age 33)
- Place of birth: Bamenda, Cameroon
- Height: 1.88 m (6 ft 2 in)
- Position: Centre-back

Youth career
- 2001–2003: Schwarz-Weiß Eppendorf
- 2003–2005: SG Wattenscheid 09
- 2005–2007: VfL Bochum
- 2007–2009: Borussia Dortmund
- 2009–2014: Liverpool

Senior career*
Years	Team	Apps	(Gls)
2014–2017	VfB Stuttgart II	47	(1)
2015–2017	VfB Stuttgart	4	(0)
2017–2018	Greuther Fürth	1	(0)
2017	Greuther Fürth II	8	(0)
2018	→ VfL Osnabrück (loan)	13	(0)
2018–2020	Heracles Almelo	8	(0)
2020–2022	Accrington Stanley	4	(0)

International career
2010	Germany U17	4	(0)
2011	Germany U18	1	(0)
2011	Germany U19	6	(0)
2013	Germany U20	5	(0)
- * Club domestic league appearances and goals as of 17 May 2021

Stephen Sama (born 5 March 1993) is professional footballer who last played as a centre-back for Accrington Stanley. Born in Cameroon, he represented Germany at the youth international level.

== Youth career ==
Sama played two years of youth football for the teams of Schwarz-Weiß Eppendorf, SG Wattenscheid 09, VfL Bochum and Borussia Dortmund, prior to joining Liverpool in 2009 to play for their U18 and then later, their U21 team. He signed a contract extension with Liverpool in 2011, until June 2014. Despite being at Liverpool for 5 years, he never played a senior game for the English team.

== Club career ==
=== VfB Stuttgart ===
On 2 September 2014, Sama signed a contract until June 2016 with VfB Stuttgart II. He made his professional debut in the 3. Liga for the second team of VfB Stuttgart on 13 September 2014 in a 2–0 away victory against Hallescher FC. On 15 October 2015, Sama extended his contract with VfB Stuttgart until June 2018.

=== Greuther Fürth ===
On 3 January 2017, Sama joined 2. Bundesliga club Greuther Fürth on a 2 1/2-year contract.

On 30 January 2018, Sama joined VfL Osnabrück on loan from Greuther Fürth until the end of the 2017–18 season.

=== Heracles Almelo ===
In July 2018 he moved to Heracles Almelo.

=== Accrington Stanley ===
In September 2020 he moved to Accrington Stanley. Sama was released at the end of the 2021–22 season.

== International career ==
Sama was born in Cameroon and moved to Germany, receiving his German citizenship in 2009. Sama has played for Germany U17, U18, U19 and U20. He participated with the German under-17 team in the 2010 UEFA European Under-17 Championship elite round. In 2011, he appeared for the under-19 team of Germany in the 2011 UEFA European Under-19 Championship elite qualification and in the 2012 UEFA European Under-19 Championship qualification.
