= Lewis Mansell =

English-born Welsh footballer

Personal information
- Full name: Lewis David Mansell
- Date of birth: 20 September 1997 (age 29)
- Place of birth: Burnley, England
- Position: Striker

Team information
- Current team: Ramsbottom United

Youth career
- –2018: Blackburn Rovers

Senior career*
Years	Team	Apps	(Gls)
2018–2019	Blackburn Rovers	0	(0)
2018	→ F.C. United of Manchester (loan)	7	(1)
2019	→ Partick Thistle (loan)	8	(1)
2019–2020	Partick Thistle	13	(1)
2020–2022	Accrington Stanley	8	(1)
2021	→ FC Halifax Town (loan)	2	(1)
2022	→ Southport (loan)	5	(0)
2023–	Ramsbottom United	1	(0)
- * Club domestic league appearances and goals as of 22:02, 28 April 2022 (UTC)

Lewis David Mansell (born 20 September 1997) is an English professional footballer who plays as a striker for Ramsbottom United.

== Club career ==
=== Blackburn Rovers ===
Born in Burnley, Mansell began his career with Blackburn Rovers, moving on loan to F.C. United of Manchester in September 2018.

Mansell went on loan to Scottish club Partick Thistle in January 2019. Mansell scored his first goal for Partick Thistle in his final appearance for the club on the last day of the 2018–19 season, opening the scoring in a 3–0 win over Queen of The South, a result which confirmed Thistle's safety in the Scottish Championship and guided the team to a sixth-place finish.

=== Partick Thistle ===
Blackburn confirmed on 15 May 2019 that Mansell would leave at the end of his contract. He subsequently returned to Scotland and signed a two-year contract with Partick Thistle. Mansell scored his first goal of the 2019–20 season in a 3–1 away win at Dundee. Mansell was meant to go out on loan from Thistle, however struggled with injury from December to February. Mansell scored on his first game back from injury for Thistle in a 2–1 loss to Raith Rovers in the Challenge Cup semi final.

Mansell was voted into the 2019–20 Scottish Championship Team of the Season, with the forward beating top scorer Lawrence Shankland in the best striker position, despite having scored one goal during the campaign.

Mansell left Thistle by mutual consent in September 2020, having made 33 appearances, scoring three times over the space of his two spells at the club.

=== Accrington Stanley ===
On 6 November 2020, Mansell joined Accrington Stanley on a one-year deal. He scored on his debut for Stanley on 10 November 2020 in an EFL Trophy group game against Barrow. On 7 January 2021, Mansell joined National League side FC Halifax Town on a one-month loan deal. He moved on loan to Southport in February 2022. Mansell was released by Accrington at the end of the 2021–22 season.

=== Ramsbottom United ===
On 18 March 2023, Mansell signed for North West Counties League Premier Division club Ramsbottom United.

== International career ==
He has been called-up to Welsh youth team training camps.

== Career statistics ==
As of 1 May 2022

Appearances and goals by club, season and competition
Club	Season	League			National Cup		League Cup		Other		Total	
Club	Season	Division	Apps	Goals	Apps	Goals	Apps	Goals	Apps	Goals	Apps	Goals
Blackburn Rovers	2018–19	EFL Championship	0	0	0	0	0	0	0	0	0	0
F.C. United of Manchester (loan)	2018–19	National League North	7	1	0	0	0	0	0	0	7	1
Partick Thistle (loan)	2018–19	Scottish Championship	8	1	3	0	0	0	0	0	11	1
Partick Thistle	2019–20	Scottish Championship	13	1	0	0	6	0	3 (Note: Appearances in the Scottish League Challenge Cup.)	1	22	2
Accrington Stanley	2020–21	EFL League One	2	0	0	0	0	0	2 (Note: Appearances in the EFL Trophy.)	1	4	1
Accrington Stanley	2021–22	EFL League One	6	1	1	0	0	0	1	0	8	1
Accrington Stanley	Total		8	1	1	0	0	0	3	1	12	2
FC Halifax Town (loan)	2020–21	National League	2	1	0	0	0	0	0	0	2	1
Southport (loan)	2021–22	National League	5	0	0	0	0	0	0	0	4	0
Career total			43	5	4	0	6	0	6	2	59	7

== Honours ==
Individual

- SPFL Scottish Championship Team of The Year 2019–20
