= Kevin Spinelli =

English footballer

Personal information
- Full name: Lorenzo Kevin Spinelli
- Date of birth: 3 December 2002 (age 23)
- Place of birth: England
- Height: 6 ft 2 in (1.88 m)
- Position: Striker

Team information
- Current team: Charnock Richard

Youth career
- –2020: Accrington Stanley

Senior career*
Years	Team	Apps	(Gls)
2020–2022	Accrington Stanley	0	(0)
2021–2022	→ Radcliffe (loan)	4	(1)
2022	→ Bamber Bridge (loan)	7	(1)
2022	Ashton United	6	(0)
2022	Glossop North End	3	(0)
2023	Runcorn Linnets	2	(0)
2023	Squires Gate	6	(2)
2023–	Charnock Richard	2	(0)
- * Club domestic league appearances and goals as of 10:30, 2 September 2023 (UTC)

Lorenzo Kevin Spinelli (born 3 December 2002) is an English professional footballer who plays as a striker for Charnock Richard.

== Career ==
He made his senior debut for Accrington Stanley on 4 September 2020, in the EFL Cup. On 12 November 2021, he joined Northern Premier League Premier Division side Radcliffe on a one-month loan, staying with them until January.

On 4 March 2022, Spinelli joined Northern Premier League Premier Division side Bamber Bridge on a one-month loan deal. He signed for Ashton United in August 2022.

On 22 October 2022, Spinelli signed for Glossop North End.

On 28 February 2023, Spinelli signed for Runcorn Linnets.

On 27 July 2023, Spinelli signed for Squires Gate.

On 21 August 2023, Spinelli signed for Charnock Richard.

== Career statistics ==
Correct as of match played 28 August 2023

Appearances and goals by club, season and competition
Club	Season	League			FA Cup		Other		Total	
Club	Season	Division	Apps	Goals	Apps	Goals	Apps	Goals	Apps	Goals
Accrington Stanley	2020–21	EFL League Two	—		—		2	0	2	0
Radcliffe (loan)	2021–22	Northern Premier League Premier Division	4	1	—		3 (Note: Three appearances in FA Trophy)	1	7	2
Bamber Bridge (loan)	2021–22	Northern Premier League Premier Division	7	1	—		—		7	1
Ashton United	2022–23	Northern Premier League Premier Division	6	0	2	0	2 (Note: One appearance in FA Trophy, one appearance in Manchester Premier Cup)	0	10	0
Glossop North End	2022–23	Northern Premier League Division One West	3	0	—		—		3	0
Runcorn Linnets	2022–23	Northern Premier League Division One West	1	0	—		—		1	0
Squires Gate	2023–24	North West Counties Premier Division	6	2	1	0	0	0	7	2
Charnock Richard	2023–24	North West Counties Premier Division	2	0	—		1 (Note: One appearance in FA Vase)	1	3	1
Career Total			29	4	3	0	8	2	40	6
