= Ben Barclay =

English footballer (born 1996)

Personal information
- Full name: Benjamin Philip Barclay
- Date of birth: 7 October 1996 (age 30)
- Place of birth: Manchester, England
- Height: 6 ft 2 in (1.87 m)
- Positions: Centre-back; defensive midfielder

Team information
- Current team: Brighton & Hove Albion
- Number: 48

Youth career
- 2004–2013: Manchester City
- 2013–2018: Brighton & Hove Albion

Senior career*
Years	Team	Apps	(Gls)
2018–2019	Brighton & Hove Albion	0	(0)
2019	→ Notts County (loan)	13	(1)
2019–2021	Accrington Stanley	34	(1)
2021–2023	Stockport County	11	(1)
2022	→ Yeovil Town (loan)	20	(1)
2022–2023	→ Carlisle United (loan)	13	(1)
2023–2025	Carlisle United	45	(1)
2025–	Brighton & Hove Albion	0	(0)
- * Club domestic league appearances and goals as of 17:48, 3 May 2025 (UTC)

Benjamin Philip Barclay (born 7 October 1996) is an English professional footballer who plays for the academy of Premier League club Brighton & Hove Albion as an overage player.

== Career ==
=== Brighton & Hove Albion ===
Barclay played regularly for Brighton U23s and made a number of appearances for the Sussex club in the Premier League 2 prior to his inclusion to the senior squad. The former Manchester City youth player was included in Chris Hughton's 25-man squad for the 2018–19 Premier League season.

He made his Brighton and professional debut on 29 August 2018, starting and playing the whole match of the 1–0 home loss against fellow Premier League outfit Southampton in the EFL Cup, with Charlie Austin scoring the late winner.

==== Notts County (loan) ====
On 4 January 2019, Barclay joined Notts County on loan until the end of the season. Barclay made his Notts County debut a day after joining the club in a League Two fixture away against Essex side Colchester United where it eventually finished 3–3, in what also happened to be his first ever league match. On 19 April 2019, Barclay scored his first ever professional goal scoring in the 94th minute in a 2–1 home defeat to MK Dons.

In the next match, which was away to Crawley Town, Barclay was sent off for violent conduct. He was sent off at 1–1, the scoreline it finished. As a result of the suspension he missed the final two games of the season where Notts County were relegated to the National League after a 3–1 away defeat to Swindon Town in the final game of the season.

==== Departure from the Albion ====
He was released from Brighton at the end of the 2018–19 season.

=== Accrington Stanley ===
On 16 July 2019, Barclay joined Accrington Stanley on a one-year contract with the option of a further year. He made his debut for Stanley on 13 August, coming in the EFL Cup starting in midfield where it finished 3–1 to Sunderland at the Crown Ground. Barclay made his league debut on 16 November, starting in the centre of midfield in a 1–0 away defeat to Rotherham United He made eight league appearances in his first season for the Lancashire-based side including a 1–0 away win over local rivals Blackpool on Boxing Day 2019, before the league being suspended in March 2020 due to the COVID-19 pandemic.

On Barclay's fourth league game of the 2020–21 season he started and played the whole match helping keep a clean sheet in a 2–0 home victory over League One leaders Hull City on 26 January 2021. He scored his first Stanley goal with a powerful header putting Accrington back level in an eventual 3–1 away loss to relegation threatened Rochdale on 17 April.

He played 21 times in the league, scoring once – 26 appearances and one goal in all competitions – in his second season at the club, including the 1–0 away win against Portsmouth on the final day of the season, knocking Pompey out of the play-offs with Accrington finishing in 11th place. Barclay was offered a new deal by the club at the end of the season. However, he departed the club making 43 appearances scoring once in all competitions after two years at Stanley.

=== Stockport County ===
On 2 August 2021, Barclay signed a three-year deal with National League side Stockport County. He made his debut on the 22 August, starting and playing the whole match in the 3–1 home loss against Dagenham & Redbridge on the opening game of the 2021–22 season. Barclay came on as an extra time substitute in the 5–3 FA Cup first round replay victory over Bolton on 17 November, knocking out the League One side. Six days later, again coming on from the bench, he scored his first goal for the Hatters, scoring Stockport's fourth in an eventual 5–0 home thrashing over King's Lynn.

==== Yeovil Town (loan) ====
On 28 January 2022, Barclay joined fellow National League side Yeovil Town on a one-month loan deal. A day later he made his debut for the Glovers, playing the full match helping keep a clean sheet in the 1–0 away win over Woking. Barclay scored his first goal for Yeovil on 19 March, opening the scoreline in an eventual 2–0 away win over Dover Athletic, a result that relegated the troubled Kent side to the National League South.

=== Carlisle United ===
==== Initial loan ====
On 4 July 2022, Barclay signed for League Two side Carlisle United on a season-long loan In an away fixture against fellow Cumbrian side Barrow on 22 April 2023, Barclay netted the only goal of the game and his first in Carlisle colours to help the side in their promotion chase.

On 20 May 2023, he scored the winning goal in the playoff semi-final against Bradford City, setting up a final against his parent club Stockport, but was ineligible to play at Wembley as players on loan can't play against their parent clubs. Carlisle went on to gain promotion to League One after beating Stockport on penalties.

==== Departure from Stockport County and permanent signing with Carlisle ====
In June 2023 Barclay agreed terms to cancel his contract at Stockport County. On 30 June 2023, Barclay signed a two-year contract with Carlisle United. On 16 May 2025, the club announced he would be leaving in June when his contract expired.

=== Return to Brighton & Hove Albion ===
On 1 July 2025, Barclay joined Brighton & Hove Albion Under-21s as a mentor and overage player.

== Career statistics ==
As of match played 3 November 2026

Appearances and goals by club, season and competition
Club	Season	League			FA Cup		EFL Cup		Other		Total	
Club	Season	Division	Apps	Goals	Apps	Goals	Apps	Goals	Apps	Goals	Apps	Goals
Brighton & Hove Albion U21s	2016–17	—							2 (Note: Appearances in EFL Trophy)	0	2	0
Brighton & Hove Albion U21s	2018–19	—							3	0	3	0
Brighton & Hove Albion U21s	2025–26	—							3	0	3	0
Brighton & Hove Albion U21s	2026–27	—							3	0	3	0
Brighton & Hove Albion U21s	Total	—							11	0	11	0
Brighton & Hove Albion	2018–19	Premier League	0	0	0	0	1	0	—		1	0
Notts County (loan)	2018–19	League Two	13	1	—		—		—		13	1
Accrington Stanley	2019–20	League One	8	0	0	0	1	0	3	0	12	0
Accrington Stanley	2020–21	League One	26	1	0	0	1	0	4	0	31	1
Accrington Stanley	Total		34	1	0	0	2	0	8	0	44	1
Stockport County	2021–22	National League	11	1	2	0	—		0	0	13	1
Stockport County	2022–23	League Two	0	0	0	0	0	0	0	0	0	0
Stockport County	Total		11	1	2	0	0	0	0	0	13	1
Yeovil Town (loan)	2021–22	National League	20	1	—		—		1 (Note: Appearance in Somerset Premier Cup)	1	21	2
Carlisle United (loan)	2022–23	League Two	13	1	1	0	1	0	2 (Note: Appearances in the League Two play-offs)	1	17	2
Carlisle United	2023–24	League One	23	0	1	0	1	0	2	0	27	0
Carlisle United	2024–25	League Two	22	1	1	0	1	0	2	0	26	1
Carlisle United	Total		58	2	3	0	3	0	6	1	70	3
Career total			136	6	5	0	6	0	24	2	171	8

== Honours ==
Stockport County

- National League: 2021–22
