= Andy Holt (businessman) =

British businessman (born 1964)

Andrew Mark Holt (born October 1964) is a British businessman and the current owner of Accrington Stanley.

== Career ==
Holt made his fortune in plastics. He established What More UK in 1999.

Holt joined the Accington Stanley club's board in 2015. He assumed control of the club in October 2015, when it was on the verge of folding due to debt.

He gained some renown for his Twitter activity responding to club supporters, and rows with the EFL, rival owners, Blackburn Rovers supporters (for insulting Jack Walker) and even Boris Johnson (for his COVID-19 response).
