= Rhys Fenlon =

English footballer

Personal information
- Full name: Rhys-James Roy Fenlon
- Date of birth: 2 November 2001 (age 25)
- Place of birth: Salford, England
- Height: 5 ft 8 in (1.73 m)
- Position: Midfielder

Team information
- Current team: Chorley
- Number: 17

Youth career
- –2014: Accrington Stanley
- 2014–2018: Manchester City
- 2018–2020: Burnley

Senior career*
Years	Team	Apps	(Gls)
2020–2023	Accrington Stanley	2	(0)
2021	→ Southport (loan)	0	(0)
2022	→ Chorley (loan)	1	(0)
2023–	Chorley	0	(0)
- * Club domestic league appearances and goals as of 19:30, 4 January 2023 (UTC)

Rhys-James Roy Fenlon (born 2 November 2001) is an English professional footballer who plays as a midfielder for National League North club Chorley.

== Career ==
Born in Salford, Fenlon started his career at Parkwydnn Juniors before joining Accrington Stanley's youth set-up at under-8s level. He later played youth football for Manchester City and Burnley. Fenlon returned to Accrington Stanley in September 2020 on a two-year contract. On 4 February 2021, Fenlon joined National League North side Southport on a youth loan until 6 March 2021. On 17 August 2022, Fenlon joined National League North side Chorley on a one month loan. On 20 May 2023, it was announced that Fenlon would leave the club when his contract ended on 30 June. Fenlon signed for Chorley on 1 August 2023.

== Personal life ==
A keen Thai-boxer, Fenlon won national championship belts at age-group level.
