= Tom Scully (English footballer) =

English footballer

Personal information
- Full name: Thomas Anthony Scully
- Date of birth: 1 October 1999 (age 27)
- Place of birth: Liverpool, England
- Height: 1.83 m (6 ft 0 in)
- Position: Midfielder

Team information
- Current team: Prescot Cables

Youth career
- Everton
- 2018–2020: Norwich City

Senior career*
Years	Team	Apps	(Gls)
2020–2022	Accrington Stanley	3	(0)
2022	→ Carrick Rangers (loan)	9	(0)
2022	→ Nantwich Town (loan)	6	(0)
2022–2023	Nantwich Town	23	(0)
2023–2025	Leek Town	54	(5)
2025–	Prescot Cables	0	(0)
- * Club domestic league appearances and goals as of 13:18, 12 May 2025 (UTC)

Thomas Anthony Scully (born 1 October 1999) is an English professional footballer who plays as a midfielder for Northern Premier League Division One West club Prescot Cables.

== Career ==
Born in Liverpool, Scully began his career with Everton, leaving that club and signing for Norwich City in the summer of 2018. In May 2019 he spoke about his struggles with depression.

After leaving Norwich, in September 2020 he signed for Accrington Stanley. He moved on loan to Carrick Rangers in January 2022.

On 13 September 2022, Scully joined Nantwich Town on a 1 month loan.

On 12 November 2022, Scully left Accrington Stanley and signed for Nantwich Town on a permanent deal.

In May 2025, following two seasons with Leek Town, Scully joined Northern Premier League Division One West side Prescot Cables.
