= Zehn Mohammed =

English footballer

Personal information
- Full name: Zehn Mekhal Mohammed
- Date of birth: 28 February 2000 (age 26)
- Place of birth: Blackburn, England
- Height: 5 ft 11 in (1.81 m)
- Position: Defender

Youth career
- –2014: Blackburn Rovers
- 2014–2017: Accrington Stanley

Senior career*
| Years | Team | Apps | (Gls) |
| 2017–2021 | Accrington Stanley | 0 | (0) |
| 2017–2018 | → Ramsbottom United (loan) | 13 | (0) |
| 2018 | → Clitheroe (loan) | | |
| 2018–2019 | → Southport (loan) | 0 | (0) |
| 2019 | → FC United of Manchester (loan) | 15 | (0) |
| 2019–2020 | → Southport (loan) | 26 | (2) |
- * Club domestic league appearances and goals as of 20:04, 17 May 2021 (UTC)

Zehn Mekhal Mohammed (born 28 February 2000) is an English professional footballer who last played as a defender for club Accrington Stanley.

== Early and personal life ==
Mohammed is from Blackburn, and went to Queen Elizabeth's Grammar School. He signed for Accrington Stanley at Under-16 level after playing Sunday league football for Mill Hill, and having a trial with the club. He previously played for Blackburn Rovers at youth level.

== Career ==
Mohammed signed a professional contract with Accrington Stanley in May 2017.

In December 2017 he went on loan to Ramsbottom United. In the 2018–19 season he had further loan spells, joining Clitheroe on a short-term loan in August 2018 and making 8 appearances, playing for Southport on loan between November 2018 and January 2019, appearing once for the club in an FA Trophy match.

He made his professional debut for Accrington on 8 January 2019 in a Football League Trophy match against Bury. Later that month he joined FC United of Manchester on loan, making his debut the next day in a victory in a league match against Bradford Park Avenue. In 2019 July he joined Southport on loan until 20 January.

On 14 May 2021 Mohammed was released.
