= List of Accrington Stanley F.C. seasons =

Accrington Stanley Football Club is an English football club based in Accrington, Lancashire. The club participates in Football League Two, the fourth tier of the English football league system.

== History ==
The original town team, Accrington, were amongst the twelve founder members of the Football League in 1888, before resigning from the league after just five years. A team called Stanley Villa already existed at the time, named as such because they were based at the Stanley Arms on Stanley Street in Accrington. With the demise of Accrington, Stanley Villa took the town name to become Accrington Stanley. The club entered the Football League in 1921 with the formation of the old Third Division North, along with the other top northern non-League clubs. In 1960, amid persistent financial difficulties mainly relating to the speculative purchase of the new Burnley Road stand, Stanley were relegated to the recently formed Division Four. However, they only managed to complete one full season in this division as bankruptcy followed shortly afterwards. Stanley lost their last League match 4–0 away at Crewe on 2 March 1962. The club sent a letter of resignation to the Football League and the resignation was accepted by Alan Hardaker, the League Secretary on 11 March, mid-way through the 1961–62 season. Stanley were accepted into the Lancashire Combination Division Two for the next season. They performed respectably well in their first season in the Combination, and earned their first (and only) promotion the following year. Unfortunately this proved to be a false dawn, as Stanley were immediately relegated after finishing bottom of Division One. By this point the club's debts had become overwhelmingly large once again, and the start of 1966 saw the final end for the club, who resigned from the Lancashire Combination and disbanded.

At a meeting at Bold Street Working Men's Club in 1968 the revival was initiated, and in August 1970 the new club was accepted into the Lancashire Combination and played its first match at a new ground, the Crown Ground. Eric Whalley, a local businessman, took control of the club in 1995 and began the development of the club's ground. After the club was relegated in 1999, Whalley appointed John Coleman as manager. In 2005–06, Stanley won the Football Conference and were promoted to League Two, switching places with relegated Oxford United – in a reversal of fortune, the team that had been elected to replace the former Accrington Stanley as members of the Football League in 1962.

== Key ==
Key to league record

- Level = Level of the league in the current league system
- Pld = Games played
- W = Games won
- D = Games drawn
- L = Games lost
- GF = Goals for
- GA = Goals against
- GD = Goals difference
- Pts = Points
- Position = Position in the final league table
- Top scorer and number of goals scored shown in bold when he was also top scorer for the division.

Key to cup records

- Res = Final reached round
- Rec = Final club record in the form of wins-draws-losses
- PR = Preliminary round
- QR1 (2, etc.) = Qualifying Cup rounds
- G = Group stage
- R1 (2, etc.) = Proper Cup rounds
- QF = Quarter-finalists
- SF = Semi-finalists
- F = Finalists
- A(QF,SF,F) = Area quarter-, semi-, finalists
- W = Winners

== Seasons ==
Year	League	Lvl	Pld	W	D	L	GF	GA	GD	Pts	Position	Leading league scorer		FA Cup		FL Cup FA Trophy		FL Trophy		Average home attendance (Note: Average home attendance = for league games only)
Year	League	Lvl	Pld	W	D	L	GF	GA	GD	Pts	Position	Name	Goals	Res	Rec	Res	Rec	Res	Rec	Average home attendance
1896–97														QR1	0-0-1					
1897–98														QR1	1-0-1					
1898–99														QR3	2-0-1					
1899–1900														PR	0-0-1					
Joined the Lancashire Combination.
1900–01	**Lancashire Combination**		34	17	2	15	55	51	+4	36	**9th of 18**									
1901–02	**Lancashire Combination**		34	21	5	8	79	48	+31	47	**3rd of 18**			QR3	2-1-1					
1902–03	**Lancashire Combination**		34	26	2	6	114	36	+78	54	**1st of 18**			QR3	2-0-1					
1903–04	**Lancashire Combination**; **Division One**		34	24	4	6	89	36	+53	52	**2nd of 18**			QR3	3-1-1					
1904–05	**Lancashire Combination**; **Division One**		34	16	5	13	57	55	+2	37	**7th of 18**			QR3	0-0-1					
1905–06	**Lancashire Combination**; **Division One**		38	22	10	6	88	33	+55	54	**1st of 20**			QR4	4-0-1					
1906–07	**Lancashire Combination**; **Division One**		38	18	7	13	76	60	+16	43	**5th of 20**			R2	2-1-1					
1907–08	**Lancashire Combination**; **Division One**		38	16	9	13	77	66	+11	41	**7th of 20**			PR	0-0-1					
1908–09	**Lancashire Combination**; **Division One**		38	15	6	17	88	87	+1	36	**12th of 20**			QR4	4-2-1					
1909–10	**Lancashire Combination**; **Division One**		38	21	9	8	71	62	+9	47	**3rd of 20**			R1	2-0-1					
1910–11	**Lancashire Combination**; **Division One**		38	15	8	15	82	78	+4	38	**7th of 20**			R1	2-0-1					
1911–12	**Lancashire Combination**; **Division One**		32	12	6	14	70	66	+4	30	**9th of 17**			QR5	1-0-1					
1912–13	**Lancashire Combination**; **Division One**		34	21	3	10	75	54	+21	45	**2nd of 18**			QR4	0-0-1					
1913–14	**Lancashire Combination**; **Division One**		34	15	8	11	76	65	+11	38	**7th of 18**			QR4	0-0-1					
1914–15	**Lancashire Combination**; **Division One**		32	15	7	10	75	59	+16	37	**6th of 17**			PR	0-1-1					
No competitive football was played between 1915 and 1919 due to the World War I.
1919–20	**Lancashire Combination**		34	18	4	12	86	73	+13	40	**7th of 18**			PR	0-0-1					
1920–21	**Lancashire Combination**		34	16	9	9	63	41	+22	41	**6th of 18**			PR	0-0-1					
Football League Third Division North created. The club were invited to join.
1921–22	**Football League**; **Third Division North**	3	38	19	3	16	73	57	+16	41	**5th of 20**			QR4	0-0-1					8,000
1922–23	**Football League**; **Third Division North**	3	38	17	7	14	59	65	-6	41	**8th of 20**			QR5	0-1-1					7,440
1923–24	**Football League**; **Third Division North**	3	42	16	8	18	48	61	-13	40	**13th of 22**			R1	2-1-1					5,660
1924–25	**Football League**; **Third Division North**	3	42	15	8	19	60	72	-12	38	**17th of 22**			R1	2-1-1					5,110
1925–26	**Football League**; **Third Division North**	3	42	17	3	22	81	105	-24	37	**18th of 22**			R3	2-0-1					4,248
1926–27	**Football League**; **Third Division North**	3	42	10	7	25	62	98	-36	27	**21st of 22**			R4	3-0-1					4,100
1927–28	**Football League**; **Third Division North**	3	42	18	8	16	76	67	+9	44	**9th of 22**			R1	0-0-1					4,741
1928–29	**Football League**; **Third Division North**	3	42	13	8	21	68	82	-14	34	**18th of 22**			R3	2-1-1					4,398
1929–30	**Football League**; **Third Division North**	3	42	14	9	19	84	81	+3	37	**16th of 22**			R2	1-0-1					4,236
1930–31	**Football League**; **Third Division North**	3	42	15	9	18	84	108	-24	39	**13th of 22**			R2	1-0-1					3,191
1931–32	**Football League**; **Third Division North**	3	40	15	6	19	75	80	-5	36	**14th of 21**			R2	1-1-1					3,521
1932–33	**Football League**; **Third Division North**	3	42	15	10	17	78	76	+2	40	**13th of 22**			R2	1-0-1					2,933
1933–34	**Football League**; **Third Division North**	3	42	13	7	22	65	101	-36	33	**20th of 22**			R3	2-1-1					2,989
1934–35	**Football League**; **Third Division North**	3	42	12	10	20	63	89	-26	34	**18th of 22**			R1	0-0-1					2,785
1935–36	**Football League**; **Third Division North**	3	42	17	8	17	63	72	-9	42	**9th of 22**			R1	0-0-1					3,351
1936–37	**Football League**; **Third Division North**	3	42	16	9	17	76	69	+7	41	**13th of 22**			R4	3-1-1					3,733
1937–38	**Football League**; **Third Division North**	3	42	11	7	24	45	75	-30	29	**22nd of 22**			R2	1-2-1					4,344
1938–39	**Football League**; **Third Division North**	3	42	7	6	29	49	103	-54	20	**22nd of 22**			R1	0-0-1					3,419
No competitive football was played between 1939 and 1946 due to the World War II.
1945–46														R3	2-1-3					
1946–47	**Football League**; **Third Division North**	3	42	14	4	24	56	92	-36	32	**20th of 22**			R1	0-1-1					3,976
1947–48	**Football League**; **Third Division North**	3	42	20	6	16	62	59	+3	46	**6th of 22**			R1	0-0-1					6,230
1948–49	**Football League**; **Third Division North**	3	42	12	10	20	55	64	-9	34	**20th of 22**			R1	0-0-1					6,001
1949–50	**Football League**; **Third Division North**	3	42	16	7	19	57	62	-5	39	**13th of 22**			R1	0-0-1					5,891
1950–51	**Football League**; **Third Division North**	3	46	11	10	25	42	101	-59	32	**23rd of 24**			R1	0-0-1					4,562
1951–52	**Football League**; **Third Division North**	3	46	10	12	24	61	92	-31	32	**22nd of 24**			R1	0-0-1					6,378
1952–53	**Football League**; **Third Division North**	3	46	8	11	27	39	89	-50	27	**24th of 24**			R2	1-0-1					5,549
1953–54	**Football League**; **Third Division North**	3	46	16	10	20	66	74	-8	42	**15th of 24**			R2	1-1-1					7,321
1954–55	**Football League**; **Third Division North**	3	46	25	11	10	96	67	+29	61	**2nd of 24**			R2	1-0-1					9,766
1955–56	**Football League**; **Third Division North**	3	46	25	9	12	92	57	+35	59	**3rd of 24**			R3	2-0-1					8,946
1956–57	**Football League**; **Third Division North**	3	46	25	8	13	95	64	+31	58	**3rd of 24**			R3	2-0-1					8,736
1957–58	**Football League**; **Third Division North**	3	46	25	9	12	83	61	+22	59	**2nd of 24**			R3	2-2-1					7,187
Regional Third divisions merged creating nationwide the Third Division and the Fourth Division. Qualified to join the Third Division.
1958–59	**Football League**; **Third Division**	3	46	15	12	19	71	87	-16	42	**19th of 24**			R4	3-1-1					6,267
1959–60	**Football League**; **Third Division**	3	46	11	5	30	57	123	-66	27	**24th of 24**; Relegated			R1	0-0-1					4,083
1960–61	**Football League**; **Fourth Division**	4	46	16	8	22	74	88	-14	40	**18th of 24**			R3	2-1-1	R1	0-0-1			3,530
1961–62	**Football League**; **Fourth Division**	4	Failed to complete the **season**, record was expunged.											R2	1-0-1	R1	0-0-1			
Resigned from the league and joined the Lancashire Combination.
1962–63	**Lancashire Combination**; **Division Two**		38	19	7	12	99	66	+33	45	**8th of 20**									
1963–64	**Lancashire Combination**; **Division Two**		34	23	6	5	90	40	+50	52	**1st of 18**; Promoted									
1964–65	**Lancashire Combination**; **Division One**		42	7	4	31	48	127	-79	18	**21st of 22**; Relegated			QR1	0-0-1					
1965–66	**Lancashire Combination**; **Division Two**		Failed to complete the season, record was expunged.																	
Folded and reestablished in 1968. Joined the Lancashire Combination two years later.
1970–71	**Lancashire Combination**		30	15	5	10	65	52	+13	35	**6th of 16**									
1971–72	**Lancashire Combination**		28	18	5	5	81	40	+41	41	**2nd of 15**			QR1	0-0-1					
1972–73	**Lancashire Combination**		38	26	7	5	96	36	+60	59	**3rd of 20**			QR2	1-2-1	R1	3-1-1			
1973–74	**Lancashire Combination**		38	29	5	4	80	26	+54	63	**1st of 20**			QR2	1-0-1	QR3	2-0-1			
1974–75	**Lancashire Combination**		38	17	7	14	75	55	+20	41	**10th of 20**			QR4	4-2-1	PR	0-0-1			
1975–76	**Lancashire Combination**		34	25	5	4	104	36	+68	55	**2nd of 18**			QR1	0-0-1	PR	0-0-1			
1976–77	**Lancashire Combination**		34	25	7	2	86	20	+66	57	**3rd of 18**			QR2	1-0-1	QR2	2-1-1			
1977–78	**Lancashire Combination**		34	25	7	2	99	32	+67	57	**1st of 18**			QR1	1-1-1	QR1	1-1-1			
Transferred to the newly created Cheshire County League Division Two.
1978–79	**Cheshire County League**; **Division Two**		34	18	6	10	65	43	+22	42	**5th of 18**			PR	0-0-1	R1	3-0-1			
1979–80	**Cheshire County League**; **Division Two**		34	20	9	5	67	33	+34	49	**2nd of 18**			QR1	1-0-1	QR2	1-1-1			
1980–81	**Cheshire County League**; **Division Two**		38	26	3	9	73	20	+53	55	**1st of 20**; Promoted			QR2	1-1-1	QR3	3-1-1			
1981–82	**Cheshire County League**; **Division One**		38	11	11	16	40	57	-17	33	**13th of 20**			QR1	1-2-1					
League merged with the Lancashire Combination to create the North West Counties Football League.
1982–83	**North West Counties League**; **Division One**	7	38	13	12	13	56	55	+1	38	**10th of 20**			QR1	0-1-1	QR1	1-0-1			
1983–84	**North West Counties League**; **Division One**	7	38	17	8	13	67	60	+7	42	**7th of 20**			QR3	3-2-1	PR	0-0-1			
1984–85	**North West Counties League**; **Division One**	7	38	11	8	19	45	59	-14	30	**15th of 20**			QR2	1-0-1	PR	0-0-1			
1985–86	**North West Counties League**; **Division One**	7	38	13	11	14	62	60	+2	37	**11th of 20**			QR2	2-1-1	PR	0-3-1			
1986–87	**North West Counties League**; **Division One**	7	38	19	15	4	63	32	+31	53	**2nd of 20**			PR	0-0-1	QR1	1-1-1			
Northern Premier League Division One created. Joined the new division.
1987–88	**Northern Premier League**; **Division One**	7	36	21	6	9	71	39	+32	69	**4th of 19**			PR	0-0-1	QR2	1-0-1			
1988–89	**Northern Premier League**; **Division One**	7	42	21	10	11	81	60	+21	73	**6th of 22**			QR2	1-2-1	QR1	0-1-1			
1989–90	**Northern Premier League**; **Division One**	7	42	22	10	10	80	53	+27	76	**3rd of 22**			QR2	2-1-1	QR1	0-0-1			
1990–91	**Northern Premier League**; **Division One**	7	42	21	13	8	83	57	+26	76	**4th of 22**; Promoted			QR4	4-0-1	QR3	2-0-1			
1991–92	**Northern Premier League**; **Premier Division**	6	42	17	12	13	78	62	+16	63	**8th of 22**			QR2	1-1-1	QR3	1-0-1			
1992–93	**Northern Premier League**; **Premier Division**	6	42	20	13	9	79	45	+34	73	**6th of 22**			R2	5-0-1	R1	3-0-1			
1993–94	**Northern Premier League**; **Premier Division**	6	42	14	7	21	63	85	-22	49	**16th of 22**			R1	1-0-1	QR3	0-0-1			
1994–95	**Northern Premier League**; **Premier Division**	6	42	12	13	17	55	77	-22	49	**15th of 22**			QR4	0-0-1	QR2	1-1-1			
1995–96	**Northern Premier League**; **Premier Division**	6	42	17	14	11	62	54	+8	62	**8th of 22**			QR2	1-0-1	QR3	2-1-1			
1996–97	**Northern Premier League**; **Premier Division**	6	44	18	12	14	77	70	+7	66	**11th of 23**			QR1	0-1-1	QR3	0-0-1			
1997–98	**Northern Premier League**; **Premier Division**	6	42	8	14	20	49	68	-19	38	**20th of 22**			QR1	0-0-1	QR3	0-0-1			
1998–99	**Northern Premier League**; **Premier Division**	6	42	9	9	24	47	77	-30	36	**22nd of 22**; Relegated			QR2	0-0-1	R3	2-1-1			
1999–2000	**Northern Premier League**; **Division One**	7	42	25	9	8	96	43	+53	84	**1st of 22**; Promoted			QR2	2-0-1	R2	1-2-1			
2000–01	**Northern Premier League**; **Premier Division**	6	44	18	10	16	72	67	+5	64	**9th of 23**			QR3	1-1-1	R3	2-1-1			613
2001–02	**Northern Premier League**; **Premier Division**	6	44	21	9	14	89	64	+25	72	**6th of 23**			QR3	1-0-1	R2	1-3-0			529
2002–03	**Northern Premier League**; **Premier Division**	6	44	30	10	4	97	44	+53	100	**1st of 23**; Promoted			QR3	1-1-1	R2	0-0-1			1,133
2003–04	**Football Conference**	5	42	15	13	14	68	61	+7	58	**10th of 22**	Paul Mullin	20	R3	2-3-1	R3	0-0-1			1,797
Football Conference expanded up to two levels and changed name of a higher division.
2004–05	**Conference**; **National**	5	42	18	11	13	72	58	+14	65	**10th of 22**	Paul Mullin	20	QR4	0-0-1	R3	0-1-1	R2	1-0-1	1,537
2005–06	**Conference**; **National**	5	42	28	7	7	76	45	+31	91	**1st of 22**; Promoted	Paul Mullin	14	QR4	0-1-1	R3	2-3-0	R1	0-1-0	1,895
2006–07	**Football**; **League Two**	4	46	13	11	22	70	81	-11	50	**20th of 24**	Paul Mullin	13	R1	0-0-1	R2	1-1-0	AQF	0-2-1	2,260
2007–08	**Football**; **League Two**	4	46	16	3	27	49	83	-34	51	**17th of 24**	Paul Mullin	12	R1	0-0-1	R1	0-0-1	R1	0-0-1	1,634
2008–09	**Football**; **League Two**	4	46	13	11	22	42	59	-17	50	**16th of 24**	Jimmy Ryan	10	R1	0-0-1	R1	0-0-1	R1	0-0-1	1,414
**2009–10**	**Football**; **League Two**	4	46	18	7	21	62	74	-12	61	**15th of 24**	Bobby Grant	14	R4	3-1-1	R2	1-0-1	ASF	3-0-1	1,980
**2010–11**	**Football**; **League Two**	4	46	18	19	9	73	55	+18	73	**5th of 24**	Phil Edwards; Sean McConville; Terry Gornell	13	R2	1-0-1	R1	1-0-1	R1	0-1-0	1,868
**2010–11**	**Football**; **League Two**	4	Lost in the **play-off** semifinal.											R2	1-0-1	R1	1-0-1	R1	0-1-0	1,868
**2011–12**	**Football**; **League Two**	4	46	14	15	17	54	66	-12	57	**14th of 24**	Pádraig Amond	7	R1	0-0-1	R1	0-0-1	R2	1-0-1	1,785
**2012–13**	**Football**; **League Two**	4	46	14	12	20	51	67	-16	54	**18th of 24**	Romuald Boco	10	R2	1-1-1	R1	0-0-1	R1	0-0-1	1,675
**2013–14**	**Football**; **League Two**	4	46	14	15	17	54	56	-2	57	**15th of 24**	Kal Naismith	10	R1	0-0-1	R2	1-0-1	R1	0-0-1	1,606
**2014–15**	**Football**; **League Two**	4	46	15	11	20	58	77	-19	56	**17th of 24**	Piero Mingoia	8	R2	1-2-1	R1	0-0-1	R1	0-0-1	1,611
**2015–16**	**Football**; **League Two**	4	46	24	13	9	74	48	+26	85	**4th of 24**	Billy Kee	17	R2	1-0-1	R1	0-1-0	R1	0-0-1	1,834
**2015–16**	**Football**; **League Two**	4	Lost in the **play-off** semifinal.											R2	1-0-1	R1	0-1-0	R1	0-0-1	1,834
**2016–17**	**Football**; **League Two**	4	46	17	14	15	59	56	+3	65	**13th of 24**	Billy Kee	13	R4	3-0-1	R3	0-2-1	G	1-0-2	1,699
**2017–18**	**Football**; **League Two**	4	46	29	6	11	76	46	+30	93	**1st of 24**; Promoted	Billy Kee	25	R1	0-2-0	R2	1-0-1	R2	2-0-2	1,979
**2018–19**	**Football**; **League One**	3	46	14	13	19	51	67	-16	55	**14th of 24**	Sean McConville	15	R4	3-0-1	R1	0-0-1	R3	2-1-2	2,827
**2019–20**	**Football**; **League One**	3	35	10	10	15	47	53	−6	40	**17th of 24**	Colby Bishop	10	R1	0-0-1	R1	0-0-1	AQF	4-1-1	2,997
**2019–20**	**Football**; **League One**	3	Final league positions decided by Points-Per-Game after league was postponed due to COVID-19											R1	0-0-1	R1	0-0-1	AQF	4-1-1	2,997
**2020–21**	**Football**; **League One**	3	46	18	13	15	63	68	−5	67	**11th of 24**	Dion Charles	19	R1	0-0-1	R1	0-1-0	R3	3-1-1	– (Note: COVID-19 prevented fans from attending games)
**2021–22**	**Football**; **League One**	3	46	17	10	19	61	80	−19	61	**12th of 24**	Colby Bishop	12	R1	0-0-1	R2	1-1-0	R2	2-2-0	2,915
**2022–23**	**Football**; **League One**	3	46	11	11	24	40	77	−37	44	**23rd of 24**; Relegated	Tommy Leigh	7	R4	3-1-1	R1	0-1-0	SF	3-2-2	2,988
**2023–24**	**Football**; **League Two**	4	46	16	9	21	63	71	−8	57	**17th of 24**	Jack Nolan	17	R1	0–1–1	R1	0–1–0	R3	3–0–2	2,560
**2024–25**	**Football**; **League Two**	4	46	12	14	20	53	69	−16	50	**21st of 24**	Shaun Whalley; Ben Woods	9	R3	1–1–1	R1	0–0–1	G	1–0–2	2,521
**2025–26**	**Football**; **League Two**	4	46	14	11	21	47	58	-11	53	**16th of 24**	Paddy Madden	6	R2	1–1–0	R2	2–0–1	G	1–1–1	2,259
