= List of Accrington Stanley F.C. managers =

Football club managers in England

Accrington Stanley F.C. was founded in October 1968 as a successor to the original Accrington Stanley which had collapsed in 1966. It is based in the Lancashire town of Accrington.

== Managerial history ==
The clubs first manager was Jimmy Hinksman.

Following the departure of manager Leam Richardson on 30 April 2013, then player-coach James Beattie expressed an interest in taking the position. On 13 May 2013, Beattie was appointed Stanley's new manager. After 16 months in the post, Beattie left by mutual consent on 12 September 2014. He managed for 58 matches with a win ratio of 27.6%.

Paul Stephenson was appointed caretaker manager who oversaw a victory against AFC Wimbledon. On 18 September 2014, John Coleman was confirmed as manager of Accrington for his second spell with the club.

== List of managers ==
Information correct after match played on 22 March 2025. Only competitive matches are counted, except the abandoned 1939–40 Football League season and matches in Wartime Leagues and Cups.

Key

- Names of caretaker managers are supplied where known, and the names of caretaker managers are highlighted in italics and marked with an asterisk (*).
- Names of player-managers are supplied where known, and are marked with a double-dagger (‡).

List of Accrington Stanley F.C. managers
Name	Nationality	From	To	Matches	Won	Drawn (Note: Drawn matches decided by penalty shoot-outs are counted as draws.)	Lost	Win% (Note: Win% is rounded to two decimal places.)	Honours	Refs.
Jimmy Hinksman		1968	1975							
Don Bramley		1975	1978							
Dave Baron		1978	1982							
Micky Finn	England	1982	1982							
Dennis Cook		1982	1983							
Pat Lynch		1983	1984							
Gerry Keenan ‡	England	1984	1985							
Frank O'Kane		1985	1986							
Eric Whalley		1986	1988							
Gary Pierce	England	1988	1989							
David Thornley		1989	1990							
Phil Staley		1990	1993							
Ken Wright		1993	1994							
Eric Whalley		1994	1995							
Stan Allan		1995	1996							
Tony Greenwood		1996	1997							
Leighton James	Wales	29 September 1997	1998							
Billy Rodaway	England	1998	1999							
John Coleman	England	1 May 1999	23 January 2012	587	236	148	203	40.20	1999–2000: Northern Premier League Division One Champions (promotion to Northern Premier); 2002–03: Northern Premier Champions (promotion to Football Conference); 2005–06: Conference Premier Champions (promotion to League Two)	
Leam Richardson*	England	23 January 2012	13 February 2012	1	1	0	0	100.00		
Paul Cook	England	13 February 2012	25 October 2012	33	8	7	18	24.24		
Leam Richardson*	England	25 October 2012	1 November 2012	1	1	0	0	100.00		
Leam Richardson	England	1 November 2012	30 April 2013	35	9	11	15	25.71		
James Beattie	England	13 May 2013	12 September 2014	58	16	16	26	27.59		
Paul Stephenson*	England	12 September 2014	18 September 2014	2	1	0	1	50.00		
John Coleman	England	18 September 2014	3 March 2024	511	200	128	183	39.14	2017–18: League Two Champions (promotion to League One)	
John Doolan	England	3 March 2024		56	15	15	26	26.79		
