= Accrington Stanley, who are they? =

UK 1980s milk advert

Accrington Stanley, who are they? is a slogan that was used in a Milk Marketing Board advert for milk in the United Kingdom in the 1980s and 1990s. The advert starred Carl Rice and Kevin Spaine.

== Advert ==
The advert features two young Liverpool fans. One tells the other that Liverpool's then-star striker Ian Rush had told him that if he didn't drink milk, he would only be good enough to play for Accrington Stanley. The other fan asks, "Accrington Stanley, who are they?", to which the first replies, "Exactly." According to Rice, Tottenham Hotspur were originally going to be named. However, Tottenham objected, so Accrington Stanley was chosen instead, as they were a non-League team at the time, and were thought of as a more obscure team. David Lloyd, a non-executive director of Accrington Stanley, said in an interview in 2012 that the advert earned the club £10,000.

== Reception ==
The advert was popular, and was continually shown for up to six years, after it was originally made in 1989. The phrase was seen to make Accrington Stanley the subject of jokes up to the present day. However, residents of Accrington view the reference positively.

In March 2006, Rice was invited as the guest of honour to watch Accrington Stanley's match against Stevenage Borough, and was later invited to Accrington Stanley's last game of the season against Scarborough, as they were promoted to Football League Two. In September 2009, the Sky Sports programme Soccer AM promoted Accrington Stanley's "Save Our Stanley" campaign because of the phrase, as they wanted to continue to use it to refer to the club, when reading fixture lists.

A shot-for-shot remake advertising Black Cow Vodka, which is made from milk, began airing in September 2016, with a much older Rice reprising his role. The advert was banned from airing in March 2017, due to concerns that it targeted children, because of the connection to the original advert, and promoted excessive drinking.

In February 2023, Kevin Spaine was given a life sentence with a minimum term of 18 years for murder, with his role in the advertisement featuring prominently in reporting on his trial and sentencing.

In December 2024, the advert once again received media interest after Liverpool were drawn against Accrington Stanley in the third round of the 2024–25 FA Cup, the first meeting of the clubs since their only other tie, in the 1955–56 FA Cup, which pre-dated the advertisement.
