= Accrington Stanley F.C. =

Association football club in England

Accrington Stanley
- Full name: Accrington Stanley Football Club
- Nicknames: The Reds; The 'Owd Reds
- Short name: Stanley; Accy Stanley
- Founded: October 1968; 58 years ago
- Ground: Crown Ground
- Capacity: 5,450 (3,100 seated)
- Owner: Andy Holt
- Manager: John Doolan
- League: EFL League Two
- 2025–26: EFL League Two, 16th of 24
- Website: accringtonstanley.co.uk
| Home colours | Away colours |

Accrington Stanley Football Club is a professional association football club, based in Accrington in Lancashire, England, that competes in the EFL League Two, the fourth level of the English football league system. Ever since its founding, its team have played at the Crown Ground; they traditionally play in red shirts, most often also with red shorts and socks. The club is known as Accrington Stanley, Stanley or just Accrington.

The club came to national prominence in 1989 due to a popular television advert for the Milk Marketing Board, which featured the slogan "Accrington Stanley, who are they?".

The current club was formed in 1968, two years after the collapse of the original Accrington Stanley. The original club was founded in 1891 and played in the Football League from 1921 to 1962 after initially competing in the Lancashire Combination. The town's original club, named simply Accrington, were founder members of the Football League in 1888, but folded six years later. The current incarnation of the club entered the Lancashire Combination and moved on to the Cheshire County League after winning the Combination title in 1977–78. Stanley won Division Two of the Cheshire County League in 1980–81 and became founder members of the North West Counties League in 1982, before being placed in Division One of the Northern Premier League five years later. After promotion to the Premier Division in 1990–91, Stanley were relegated in 1999.

The early 21st century saw the club win three promotions in seven seasons under the stewardship of John Coleman to gain a place in the Football League. They won three divisional titles in each of their three promotions: Northern Premier League Division One (1999–2000), Northern Premier League Premier Division (2002–03) and the Conference National (2005–06). This marked the return of Accrington to the professional league system after 44 years. They then spent 12 seasons mostly in the bottom half of the table in League Two, though did also lose two play-off semi-finals, before Coleman led them to promotion to League One as League Two champions in 2017–18. The club was relegated to League Two in 2022–23.

== History ==
=== Re-formation (1968–2003) ===
Accrington had been without a football team following the collapse of the original Accrington Stanley in 1966. The original team had been formed in 1891 and played in the Football League from 1921 to March 1962, but had spent its final four seasons in the Lancashire Combination. At a meeting at Bold Street Working Men's Club in 1968 the revival was initiated, and in August 1970 the new club played at a new ground, the Crown Ground. Eric Whalley, a local businessman, took control of the club in 1995 and began the development of the club's ground. After the club was relegated in 1999, Whalley appointed John Coleman as manager.

The club's rise to the Football League is attributed in part to the windfall of hundreds of thousands of pounds reaped by the sell-on clause in the December 2001 transfer of former Stanley star Brett Ormerod to Southampton, which paid Blackpool over a million pounds for his contract. Stanley had taken £50,000 from Blackpool in 1997, with the agreement that Blackpool would pay Accrington a quarter of what it might have received if it in turn transferred Ormerod to another team. Upon Accrington receiving this money, the club quickly won the 2002–03 championship of the Northern Premier League.

=== Conference years (2003–2006) ===
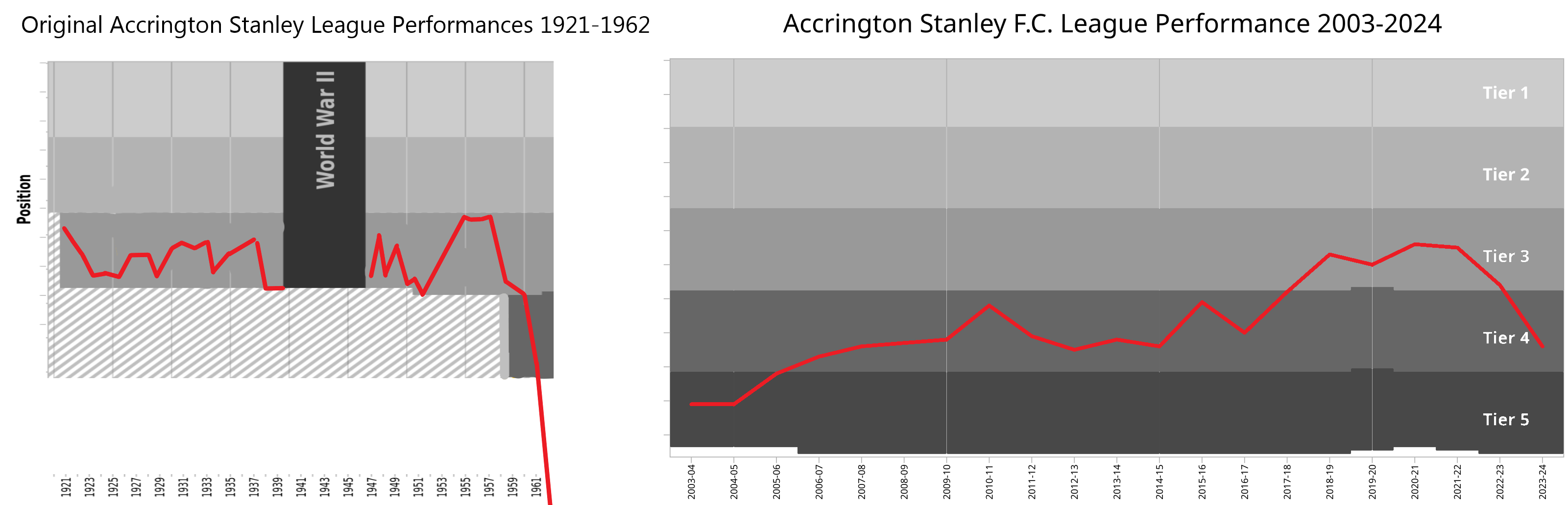
Chart of yearly table positions of Accrington Stanley in the English football league system including the old Accrington Stanley that Liquidated in 1962.

In May 2003, the club was promoted for the first time in its history to the Football Conference after winning the Northern Premier League championship. The club's first game in the league was away to another reformed club, Aldershot Town, on Sunday 10 August 2003. The game was shown live on Sky Sports and Accrington lost 2–1. The club finished their first fifth-tier season in 10th position; a highlight was a run to the FA Cup 3rd round, losing in a replay at League One side Colchester United.

In 2004, Accrington Stanley turned professional. The following 2004–05 season, Stanley again achieved a final position of 10th, with Paul Mullin among the top goal scorers, with 20 goals. The club was also one of 12 Conference sides to played in the Football League Trophy, winning at Bradford City in September 2004.

Stanley's stay in the Conference did not last long, with the club being promoted to the Football League at the end of the 2005–06 season. The club had a 19-game unbeaten run from October to March, and finished on 91 points, leaving the club an easy passage to League Two. Mullin, Rob Elliot and Gary Roberts led the club back to the league after 46 years away.

=== Return to the Football League (2006–present) ===
The club's first Football League game was on 5 August 2006, a 2–0 defeat at Chester City. Accrington fought a relegation battle throughout its first fourth-tier season. Five wins in the last nine games of the season led to a 20th-place finish and was enough to avoid relegation. Highlights of that first season back included the club's first-ever Football League Cup match against former European Cup winners Nottingham Forest. A 1–0 win led the club to a second-round away tie against then Premier League team Watford, which Stanley lost 6–5 on penalties after a 0–0 draw and extra-time. In the Football League Trophy for the first time as a league club, Accrington defeated Carlisle United and Blackpool in the early rounds, but were knocked out by Doncaster Rovers in the Area Quarter-finals.

The 2007–08 season saw the club involved in another relegation battle with strugglers Chester City, Wrexham and Mansfield Town. Five wins in the final 12 games were enough to secure a 17th-place finish and another fourth-tier season. However, the club failed to win a game in the FA Cup and League Cup, losing to Huddersfield Town and Leicester City respectively.

Performances during the 2008–09 season improved slightly, with the club achieving a 16th-place finish in League Two, with six League wins in the last 12 games. Young prospect Bobby Grant finally fulfilled the early promise seen in previous seasons. The club again failed to make it past the early round of any of the domestic cups, losing in the first round to Wolverhampton Wanderers in the League Cup and Tranmere Rovers in both the FA Cup (albeit after a replay) and Football League Trophy.

The 2009–10 season was better, with the club pushing for a play-off place at the turn of the year. Nine wins in 10 League games saw the club with a chance of making the play-offs, only for this to fade in March/April. The partnership of Michael Symes and Bobby Grant was a key aspect but, following their achievements throughout the season, both moved on to bigger clubs. In terms of cup performance the club reached the 2nd round of the League Cup (losing 2–1 to Queens Park Rangers), the quarter-finals of the Football League Trophy (losing 2–0 to Leeds United), and the 4th round of the FA Cup (losing 3–1 to Premier League team Fulham).

The club reached the Football League Two play-offs during the 2010–11 season, one of the most successful in its history. One defeat in 19 games from February to May saw the club finish in 5th position, eventually losing to League Two newcomers Stevenage in the play-off semi-finals. The season saw the emergence of Jimmy Ryan as a star in the making, along with goalkeeper Alex Cisak and midfielder Sean McConville. In the domestic cups, Stanley reached the second round of the League Cup (losing 3–2 to Premier League team Newcastle United). The club won its first-round game in the Football League Trophy away to Tranmere Rovers, but was then forced to resign from the competition having fielded the ineligible Ray Putterill. The club also reached the second round of the FA Cup, but lost to fellow League Two side Port Vale.

The 2011–12 season was one of transition for the club. The loss of six of the playoff-chasing side of the previous season meant a shaky start but the arrival of Bryan Hughes in October transformed the club's fortunes, and six wins in seven games over the Christmas period saw the club briefly enter the play-offs. However, following the sale of club captain Andrew Procter to Preston North End in the January 2012 transfer window, the third-longest serving management team of John Coleman and Jimmy Bell departed for Rochdale. Former Burnley and club favourite Paul Cook was brought in as manager, with Leam Richardson promoted from caretaker manager to full-time assistant. But the club finished the season with just three wins in the final 17 games, ending in 14th position. Stanley exited the League Cup and FA Cup at the first round stages, losing to Scunthorpe United and Notts County respectively. The club reached the second round of the Football League Trophy, after knocking out holders Carlisle United, but lost to Tranmere Rovers in the second round after a replay following a serious head injury to defender Thomas Bender in the initial tie.

==== Andy Holt's stewardship (2015–present) ====
In July 2015, local businessman Andy Holt attended Stanley's pre-season friendly at home against local rivals Burnley, which they won 4–2. It was during this game that Holt got an insight into the dire state of Stanley, discovering the club's bar was unable to serve spectators due to a failure to pay its suppliers. On 28 October 2015, Accrington Stanley's board voted to approve Holt's takeover of the club. Holt, whose company What More UK sponsored, and still sponsor, Stanley's Wham Stadium, attained a majority share of 75% in Accrington Stanley, in return for clearing the club's £1.2m debt as well as providing the club with further funds of £600,000. Stanley's chairman, Peter Marsden, remained as chairman whilst five new people joined the club's board. At the time of the takeover, Stanley had been on the verge of folding due to crippling debts and its inability to fund day-to-day running costs, including wages and its suppliers. Due to its precarious financial situation, the club had been accepting sponsorship deals at a value lower than what should have been demanded.

During Holt's first season as owner of the club, the 2015–16 Football League Two season, the club narrowly missed out on automatic promotion to League One on the final day of the season, having been held to a 0–0 draw with Stevenage. Stanley were then defeated in the semi-final of the League Two play-offs, losing 3–2 on aggregate to eventual play-off victors AFC Wimbledon. At the end of the season, Stanley lost several players who had helped the promotion push, such as Tom Davies, Ross Etheridge and Josh Windass, who had agreed contracts with clubs able to offer higher wages than Stanley. With Windass and Crooks being under 24, Stanley received £120,000 for the duo's transfer to Rangers.

During the 2016–17 pre-season, Stanley improved facilities at the Crown Ground, replacing vendors with its own in-house service, and Stanley's chairman, Marsden, stepped down after a decade in the role. Marsden was replaced by Holt in the position. In the following 2016–17 season, Stanley finished mid-table in 13th position, having struggled to replicate its promotion push from the season before. The club had, however, enjoyed a run to the fourth round of the FA Cup, with a 1–0 defeat away to Middlesbrough ending their cup campaign.

At the end of the 2017–18 season, Stanley won the League Two championship, with their 2–0 win over Yeovil Town on 17 April 2018 sealing promotion. In their first season in League One, the club finished in 14th place.

Stanley were relegated to League Two in 2022–23 after finishing second from bottom in League One. In March 2024, John Coleman was sacked as manager after nine and a half years in the role. John Doolan then took over, finishing the 2023–24 season in 17th place and the following season in 21st place. In May 2025, Holt stepped down as chairman, and the club announced it was closing its academy, blaming "significant financial challenges", despite an offer from the local council to fund the academy for 12 months.

== Name ==
The original town club, Accrington, was amongst the twelve founder members of the Football League in 1888, before resigning from the league after just five years. A team called Stanley Villa already existed at the time, named as such because they were based at the Stanley Working Men's Club on Stanley Street in Accrington. With the demise of Accrington, Stanley Villa took the town name to become Accrington Stanley.

== Stadium ==
Since leaving Peel Park, the club has played at the Crown Ground, currently known as the Wham Stadium as part of a three-year £200,000 sponsorship deal with What More UK Ltd.

Prior to Holt's takeover of Stanley, the Crown Ground had a reputation for being one of the poorest grounds within the top four leagues of English football. However, Holt's stewardship of the club lead to changes at the Crown Ground, with initial changes including improved match day facilities before the construction of a new Whinney Hill Stand, which was built and completed in late-2018.

The following season, Stanley invested around £300,000 in a new playing field, a move which saw new drainage and a levelled pitch installed to overcome the club's issue with recurring flooding towards the Coppice End.

In January 2021, work begun on the construction of a new and improved Jack Barrett Stand, work which will see a new bar and hospitality area provided as part of the plans.

== Rivalries ==
According to a survey conducted in August 2019, Stanley supporters consider traditional Lancashire clubs Rochdale, Morecambe and Bury to be their biggest rivals, with near neighbours Blackburn Rovers and Burnley following.

== Television advertisement ==
In the 1980s, the club was mentioned in a British advert for milk, which briefly brought the club to the attention of the general public. The advertisement featured two boys in Liverpool replica shirts played by young actors Carl Rice and Kevin Spaine. It made reference to Accrington Stanley's obscurity in comparison to Liverpool's success at the time.
Boy 1: "Milk! Urghh!"
Boy 2: "It's what Ian Rush drinks."
Boy 1: "Ian Rush?"
Boy 2: "Yeah. And he said if I didn't drink lots of milk, when I grow up, I'll only be good enough to play for Accrington Stanley."
Boy 1: "Accrington Stanley, who are they?"
Boy 2: "Exactly."

In the former weekly football show, Soccer AM, the phrase "Accrington Stanley, who are they?" is said every time a fixture is read out that has the club in it, referring to the milk advert.

== Players ==
=== Current squad ===
As of 2 September 2026

Note: Flags indicate national team as defined under FIFA eligibility rules; some limited exceptions apply. Players may hold more than one non-FIFA nationality.

| No. | Pos. | Nation | Player |
|---|---|---|---|
| 1 | GK | ENG | Louie Moulden (on loan from Norwich City) |
| 2 | DF | SCO | Donald Love |
| 3 | DF | ENG | Oliver Smith |
| 4 | DF | ENG | Tom Moore |
| 5 | DF | ENG | Farrend Rawson |
| 6 | MF | ENG | Liam Coyle |
| 7 | MF | ENG | Shaun Whalley |
| 8 | MF | ENG | Conor Grant |
| 9 | FW | ENG | Kelsey Mooney |
| 10 | MF | ENG | Alex Henderson |
| 11 | MF | ENG | Isaac Sinclair |
| 13 | FW | ENG | Cole Stockton |
| 14 | MF | ESP | Stefan Mols |
| 16 | MF | SCO | Aidan Borland (on loan from Aston Villa) |

| No. | Pos. | Nation | Player |
|---|---|---|---|
| 17 | DF | ENG | Devon Matthews |
| 18 | FW | WAL | Charlie Caton |
| 20 | FW | ENG | Charlie Brown |
| 21 | GK | ENG | James Rogerson |
| 22 | DF | ENG | Joe Anderson |
| 23 | MF | ENG | Tyler Walton |
| 25 | DF | ENG | Josh Smith |
| 27 | FW | ENG | Joel Catesby (on loan from Everton) |
| 28 | MF | IRL | Seamus Conneely (captain) |
| 30 | FW | ENG | Charlie Warren (on loan from Bolton Wanderers) |
| 33 | DF | COD | David Tutonda |
| 38 | DF | IRL | Connor O'Brien |
| 39 | FW | ENG | Josh Woods |
| 49 | MF | ENG | Ronan Darcy |

=== Out on loan ===
Note: Flags indicate national team as defined under FIFA eligibility rules; some limited exceptions apply. Players may hold more than one non-FIFA nationality.

| No. | Pos. | Nation | Player |
|---|---|---|---|
| 19 | FW | NGR | Anjola Popoola (on loan at Chorley) |

=== Retired numbers ===
In January 2020, Stanley icon Billy Kee announced his retirement from professional football, having battled with mental health issues that had seen Kee last appear for Stanley the previous season. In honour of the forward, Stanley announced that they were to retire Kee's 29 shirt number.

Note: Flags indicate national team as defined under FIFA eligibility rules; some limited exceptions apply. Players may hold more than one non-FIFA nationality.

| No. | Pos. | Nation | Player |
|---|---|---|---|
| 29 | FW | NIR | Billy Kee (2009–10, 2015–20) |

=== Former players ===
In a PFA Fans' Favourites survey published by the Professional Footballers' Association in December 2007, Chris Grimshaw was listed as the all-time favourite player amongst Accrington Stanley fans.

== Club officials/staff ==
- Chairman: Andy Holt
- Vice Chairman: David Burgess
- Managing Director: Warren Eastham
- Directors: Thomas O'Neill, Virginia Hargreaves
- Manager: John Doolan
- Assistant Manager: Ged Brannan
- First Team GK Coach: Tony Warner
- Chief Doctor: Joyce Watson
- Head of Medical: Connor Lloyd
- Head Therapist: Paul Winstanley
- Physio: Dan Green
- Strength and Conditioning: Chris Scholes
- Kitman: George Quigley

== Records ==
- Best FA Cup performance: Fourth round, 2009–10, 2018–19, 2022–23
- Best League Cup performance: Third round, 2016–17
- Best EFL Trophy performance: Semi-finals, 2022–23
- Best FA Trophy performance: Third round, 1998–99, 2000–01, 2003–04, 2004–05 (replay), 2005–06 (replay)

== Honours ==
League

- League Two (level 4)
  - Champions: 2017–18
- Conference (level 5)
  - Champions: 2005–06
- Northern Premier League (level 6)
  - Champions: 2002–03
- Northern Premier League Division One
  - Champions: 1999–2000
- Lancashire Combination
  - Champions: 1973–74, 1977–78
- Cheshire County League Division Two
  - Champions: 1980–81

Cup

- Northern Premier League Challenge Cup
  - Winners: 2001–02
- Northern Premier League Challenge Shield
  - Winners: 2002–03
- Lancashire Combination Cup
  - Winners: 1971–72, 1972–73, 1973–74, 1976–77
- Lancashire Combination League Cup
  - Winners: 1971–72

== See also ==
- List of Accrington Stanley F.C. seasons
- List of Accrington Stanley F.C. managers
- List of Accrington Stanley F.C. players
