= 1995–96 FA Cup qualifying rounds =

Tournament details
- Country: England; Wales

The 1995–96 FA Cup qualifying rounds opened the 115th season of competition in England for 'The Football Association Challenge Cup' (FA Cup), the world's oldest association football single knockout competition. A total of 575 clubs were accepted for the competition, up 18 from the previous season's 557.

The large number of clubs entering the tournament from lower down (Levels 5 through 8) in the English football pyramid meant that the competition started with five rounds of preliminary (1) and qualifying (4) knockouts for these non-League teams. The 28 winning teams from fourth round qualifying progressed to the First round proper, where League teams tiered at Levels 3 and 4 entered the competition.

== Calendar ==
Round	Start date	New Entries	Clubs
Preliminary round	Saturday 26 August 1995	342	575 → 404
First round qualifying	Saturday 9 September 1995	117	404 → 260
Second round qualifying	Saturday 23 September 1995	none	260 → 188
Third round qualifying	Saturday 7 October 1995	none	188 → 152
Fourth round qualifying	Saturday 21 October 1995	20	152 → 124
First round proper	Saturday 11 November 1995	52	124 → 84
Second round proper	Saturday 2 December 1995	none	84 → 64
Third round proper	Saturday 6 January 1996	44	64 → 32
Fourth round proper	Saturday 27 January 1996	none	32 → 16
Fifth round proper	Saturday 17 February 1996	none	16 → 8
Sixth round proper	Saturday 9 March 1996	none	8 → 4
Semi-finals	Saturday 31 March 1996	none	4 → 2
Final	Saturday 11 May 1996	none	2 → 1

== Preliminary round ==
=== Ties ===
Tie	Home team	Score	Away team
1	A F C Lymington	0-2	Calne Town
2	A F C Totton	3-1	Fleet Town
3	Abingdon Town	3-2	Andover
4	Aldershot Town	5-0	Selsey
5	Alnwick Town	1-3	Glasshoughton Welfare
6	Armthorpe Welfare	1-1	Bradford Park Avenue
7	Arnold	2-0	Maine Road
8	Aveley	0-0	Stowmarket Town
9	Backwell United	0-1	Elmore
10	Banstead Athletic	3-1	Burgess Hill Town
11	Barking	1-0	Royston Town
12	Barnstaple Town	2-0	Minehead
13	Basildon United	1-2	Saffron Walden Town
14	Bedfont	0-0	Langford
15	Bedford Town	1-4	Edgware Town
16	Belper Town	2-3	Worksop Town
17	Bemerton Heath Harlequins	2-3	Ryde
18	Bicester Town	0-1	Ringmer
19	Biggleswade Town	0-4	Berkhamsted Town
20	Bilston Town	0-0	Blakenall
21	Blidworth Welfare	0-0	Rossendale United
22	Bognor Regis Town	4-3	Whitehawk
23	Bournemouth	0-4	Wimborne Town
24	Bracknell Town	0-0	Kingsbury Town
25	Brandon United	1-4	Chester-Le-Street Town
26	Brierley Hill Town	0-0	Sandwell Borough
27	Brigg Town	1-1	Clitheroe
28	Brimsdown Rovers	0-2	Barton Rovers
29	Brockenhurst	0-0	Swanage Town & Herston
30	Brook House	0-0	Welwyn Garden City
31	Burnham Ramblers	1-3	Holbeach United
32	Burscough	2-2	Northallerton
33	Bury Town	1-2	Collier Row
34	Chadderton	0-1	Eastwood Town
35	Chasetown	2-1	Halesowen Harriers
36	Chatham Town	3-1	Whyteleafe
37	Cheshunt	0-1	Wealdstone
38	Chippenham Town	0-0	Paulton Rovers
39	Chipstead	0-4	Horsham
40	Clapton	2-1	Leighton Town
41	Clevedon Town	1-5	Mangotsfield United
42	Concord Rangers	2-1	Wootton Blue Cross
43	Corinthian Casuals	3-0	Stamco
44	Crook Town	3-2	Kimberley Town
45	Crowborough Athletic	1-3	Godalming & Guildford
46	Croydon	5-2	Dorking
47	Darlington Cleveland Social	0-3	Billingham Synthonia
48	Dartford	3-1	Egham Town
49	Denaby United	4-0	Hucknall Town
50	Desborough Town	0-0	Rocester
51	Devizes Town	1-1	Bristol Manor Farm
52	East Ham United	0-7	Sudbury Wanderers
53	East Thurrock United	1-1	Tiptree United
54	Eccleshill United	3-2	Atherton Laburnum Rovers
55	Epsom & Ewell	0-4	Tooting & Mitcham United
56	Esh Winning	3-1	Stockton
57	Eynesbury Rovers	4-1	Witham Town
58	Falmouth Town	3-0	Frome Town
59	Fareham Town	1-1	Weymouth
60	Farsley Celtic	2-2	Oldham Town
61	Felixstowe Port & Town	1-1	Burnham
62	Fisher '93	0-0	Merstham
63	Flackwell Heath	1-0	Potters Bar Town
64	Folkestone Invicta	1-1	Peacehaven & Telscombe
65	Forest Green Rovers	4-0	Exmouth Town
66	Glastonbury	1-5	Tuffley Rovers
67	Glossop North End	1-2	Nantwich Town
68	Goole Town	2-2	Great Harwood Town
69	Gorleston	1-5	Diss Town
70	Gosport Borough	2-0	Eastleigh
71	Great Yarmouth Town	2-1	Bourne Town
72	Guisborough Town	1-0	Gretna
73	Hadleigh United	1-0	Southall
74	Halstead Town	1-1	Stamford
75	Hanwell Town	2-4	Wingate & Finchley
76	Harefield United	0-1	Hoddesdon Town
77	Harlow Town	2-3	Thamesmead Town
78	Haverhill Rovers	0-1	Hampton
79	Herne Bay	1-1	Horsham Y M C A
80	Hertford Town	2-1	Ware
81	Hillingdon Borough	2-0	Cornard United
82	Hinckley Athletic	1-1	Ashton United
83	Hornchurch	3-0	Bowers United
84	Hungerford Town	5-0	Poole Town
85	Immingham Town	1-1	Rossington Main
86	King's Lynn	3-0	Wivenhoe Town
87	Knypersley Victoria	0-3	Stratford Town
88	Leicester United	0-0	Barwell
89	Leigh R M I	2-0	Flixton
90	Lewes	2-1	Lancing
91	Leyton Pennant	2-2	Clacton Town
92	Lincoln United	3-2	Stocksbridge Park Steels
93	Littlehampton Town	1-1	Southwick
94	Liversedge	1-4	Blackpool Rovers
95	Long Buckby	2-1	Stewart & Lloyds Corby
96	Louth United	4-0	Harworth Colliery Institute
97	Lowestoft Town	2-2	Chalfont St Peter
98	Maltby Miners Welfare	3-3	Mossley
99	March Town United	1-0	Fakenham Town
100	Melksham Town	1-2	Bridport
101	Metropolitan Police	7-0	Viking Sports
102	Milton Keynes	0-4	Leatherhead
103	Netherfield	10-1	Evenwood Town
104	Newbury Town scr-w/o Buckingham Town		
105	Newmarket Town	0-1	Boston Town
106	Newport Pagnell Town	0-2	Boldmere St Michaels
107	North Ferriby United	2-4	Heanor Town
108	Northampton Spencer	2-2	Cogenhoe United
109	Northwood	3-2	Ford United
110	Oldbury United	4-0	Darlaston
111	Ossett Albion	1-3	Hatfield Main
112	Ossett Town	3-2	Castleton Gabriels
113	Pelsall Villa	1-1	Dudley Town
114	Pershore Town	1-1	Evesham United
115	Pontefract Collieries	4-1	Oakham United
116	Prescot	3-0	Atherton Collieries
117	Prudhoe Town	1-3	Consett
118	R T M Newcastle	1-2	Harrogate Railway Athletic
119	Radcliffe Borough	3-2	Alfreton Town
120	Raynes Park Vale	3-0	Canterbury City
121	Redditch United	2-2	Bridgnorth Town
122	Redhill	3-1	Tunbridge Wells
123	Rothwell Town	2-0	Rushall Olympic
124	Ryhope Community Association	2-2	Morpeth Town
125	Salford City	1-2	Newcastle Town
126	Saltash United	3-2	Torrington
127	Seaham Red Star	1-2	Billingham Town
128	Sheffield w/o-scr Caernarfon Town		
129	Sheppey United	2-0	Arundel
130	Shepshed Dynamo	0-1	Grantham Town
131	Shifnal Town	0-0	Willenhall Town
132	Shoreham	4-2	Corinthian
133	Shotton Comrades	1-1	Shildon
134	Slade Green	0-2	Langney Sports
135	Soham Town Rangers	1-1	Stotfold
136	South Shields	3-4	Pickering Town
137	Spalding United	2-3	Harwich & Parkeston
138	St Helens Town	1-2	Bootle
139	Stapenhill	1-2	Lye Town
140	Steyning Town	3-0	Cove
141	Stourport Swifts	0-1	Armitage '90
142	Tadcaster Albion	1-1	Bedlington Terriers
143	Tamworth	3-1	Hinckley Town
144	Thackley	5-2	Cheadle Town
145	Thame United	4-0	Maidenhead United
146	Thatcham Town	2-1	Oakwood
147	Three Bridges	0-5	Camberley Town
148	Tilbury	1-2	Woodbridge Town
149	Tonbridge Angels	3-1	Croydon Athletic
150	Trafford	2-1	Fleetwood
151	Tufnell Park	1-0	Potton United
152	Uxbridge	4-0	Kempston Rovers
153	Washington	1-0	Garforth Town (Tie awarded to Garforth Town)
154	Wednesfield	2-2	Banbury United
155	Wellingborough Town	0-4	Bolehall Swifts
156	Welton Rovers	2-0	Odd Down
157	West Midlands Police	1-1	Raunds Town
158	Westbury United	2-2	Basingstoke Town
159	Westfields	1-1	Corby Town
160	Weston Super Mare	7-0	St Blazey
161	Whitley Bay	3-0	Easington Colliery
162	Whitstable Town	3-2	Hailsham Town
163	Wick	3-2	Portfield
164	Willington	0-0	Dunston Federation Brewery
165	Winterton Rangers	2-0	Darwen
166	Wisbech Town	4-0	Tring Town
167	Witney Town	5-0	B A T Sports
168	Worcester City	1-2	Yate Town
169	Workington	8-1	Hebburn
170	Wroxham	0-0	Canvey Island
171	Yorkshire Amateur	2-4	Borrowash Victoria

=== Replays ===
Tie	Home team	Score	Away team
6	Bradford Park Avenue	1-0	Armthorpe Welfare
8	Stowmarket Town	3-4	Aveley
14	Langford	1-1	Bedfont
20	Blakenall	2-1	Bilston Town
21	Rossendale United	3-0	Blidworth Welfare
24	Kingsbury Town	0-0	Bracknell Town
26	Sandwell Borough	5-3	Brierley Hill Town
27	Clitheroe	1-0	Brigg Town
29	Swanage Town & Herston	1-1	Brockenhurst
30	Welwyn Garden City	0-2	Brook House
32	Northallerton	1-2	Burscough
38	Paulton Rovers	1-1	Chippenham Town
50	Rocester	2-4	Desborough Town
51	Bristol Manor Farm	3-1	Devizes Town
53	Tiptree United	6-2	East Thurrock United
59	Weymouth	3-2	Fareham Town
60	Oldham Town	0-2	Farsley Celtic
61	Burnham	2-3	Felixstowe Port & Town
62	Merstham	0-2	Fisher '93
64	Peacehaven & Telscombe	4-1	Folkestone Invicta
68	Great Harwood Town	3-2	Goole Town
74	Stamford	3-3	Halstead Town
79	Horsham Y M C A	1-4	Herne Bay
82	Ashton United	2-4	Hinckley Athletic
85	Rossington Main	1-4	Immingham Town
88	Barwell	1-1	Leicester United
91	Clacton Town	0-4	Leyton Pennant
93	Southwick	1-0	Littlehampton Town
97	Chalfont St Peter	4-1	Lowestoft Town
98	Mossley	4-0	Maltby Miners Welfare
108	Cogenhoe United	1-0	Northampton Spencer
113	Dudley Town	1-0	Pelsall Villa
114	Evesham United	3-2	Pershore Town
121	Bridgnorth Town	1-4	Redditch United
124	Morpeth Town	3-1	Ryhope Community Association
131	Willenhall Town	0-1	Shifnal Town
133	Shildon	2-1	Shotton Comrades
135	Stotfold	4-1	Soham Town Rangers
142	Bedlington Terriers	3-0	Tadcaster Albion
154	Banbury United	0-3	Wednesfield
157	Raunds Town	3-2	West Midlands Police
158	Basingstoke Town	5-1	Westbury United
159	Corby Town	7-5	Westfields
164	Dunston Federation Brewery	5-2	Willington
170	Canvey Island	3-1	Wroxham

=== 2nd replays ===
Tie	Home team	Score	Away team
14	Bedfont	0-4	Langford
24	Kingsbury Town	1-1	Bracknell Town
29	Brockenhurst	1-0	Swanage Town & Herston
38	Chippenham Town	0-2	Paulton Rovers
74	Stamford	1-2	Halstead Town
88	Barwell	3-4	Leicester United

=== 3rd replay ===
Tie	Home team	Score	Away team
24	Bracknell Town	3-2	Kingsbury Town

== 1st qualifying round ==
=== Ties ===
Tie	Home team	Score	Away team
1	Abingdon Town	2-3	Newport I O W
2	Accrington Stanley	2-1	Ossett Town
3	Aldershot Town	4-0	Pagham
4	Arlesey Town	3-0	Leyton Pennant
5	Ashford Town (Kent)	2-0	Tonbridge Angels
6	Atherstone United	3-3	Armitage '90
7	Baldock Town	2-1	Metropolitan Police
8	Bamber Bridge	4-1	Heanor Town
9	Barking	1-3	Clapton
10	Barrow	3-0	Consett
11	Basingstoke Town	2-1	Havant Town
12	Berkhamsted Town	3-2	Hillingdon Borough
13	Bideford	2-2	Elmore
14	Billericay Town	2-0	Aveley
15	Billingham Synthonia	3-1	Shildon
16	Bishop Auckland	2-1	Harrogate Railway Athletic
17	Bishop's Stortford	2-2	Boston Town
18	Blyth Spartans	6-0	Garforth Town
19	Boldmere St Michaels	1-2	Bedworth United
20	Bolehall Swifts	0-1	Tamworth
21	Boreham Wood	1-0	Chalfont St Peter
22	Boston United	1-2	Wisbech Town
23	Bracknell Town	1-1	Thamesmead Town
24	Bridport	0-3	Merthyr Tydfil
25	Bromley	3-1	Herne Bay
26	Burton Albion	4-0	Stratford Town
27	Cambridge City	2-3	Canvey Island
28	Carshalton Athletic	3-1	Sheppey United
29	Chasetown	1-3	Solihull Borough
30	Chatham Town	1-1	Ramsgate
31	Chelmsford City	1-0	Collier Row
32	Cheltenham Town	5-0	Yate Town
33	Chertsey Town	2-2	Shoreham
34	Chorley	2-2	Farsley Celtic
35	Concord Rangers	0-3	Hayes
36	Congleton Town	3-1	Pontefract Collieries
37	Corinthian Casuals	2-5	Margate
38	Crook Town	1-1	Curzon Ashton
39	Croydon	2-3	Hastings Town
40	Dagenham & Redbridge	4-0	Hornchurch
41	Denaby United	3-0	Bootle
42	Diss Town	0-2	Heybridge Swifts
43	Dorchester Town	2-2	Wimborne Town
44	Dover Athletic	1-2	Bognor Regis Town
45	Dulwich Hamlet	7-1	Southwick
46	Durham City	1-1	Blackpool Rovers
47	Eastwood Town	2-1	Buxton
48	Eccleshill United	2-3	Lincoln United
49	Edgware Town	0-1	Chesham United
50	Emley	6-0	Thackley
51	Erith & Belvedere	4-1	Redhill
52	Esh Winning	1-2	West Auckland Town
53	Eynesbury Rovers	7-1	Halstead Town
54	Falmouth Town	1-1	Weston Super Mare
55	Farnborough Town	1-0	Dartford
56	Fisher '93	7-0	Lewes
57	Forest Green Rovers	2-1	Mangotsfield United
58	Frickley Athletic	0-0	Prescot
59	Gainsborough Trinity	2-0	Arnold
60	Gateshead	3-2	Dunston Federation Brewery
61	Gloucester City	8-0	Bristol Manor Farm
62	Gravesend & Northfleet	7-0	Godalming & Guildford
63	Grays Athletic	2-2	Wealdstone
64	Great Yarmouth Town	2-1	Mirrlees Blackstone
65	Gresley Rovers	1-2	Dudley Town
66	Guisborough Town	1-0	Murton
67	Guiseley	3-0	Leigh R M I
68	Halesowen Town	3-2	Blakenall
69	Hampton	1-2	Staines Town
70	Harrogate Town	1-2	Bedlington Terriers
71	Harrow Borough	2-1	Leatherhead
72	Harwich & Parkeston	0-1	Braintree Town
73	Hatfield Main	0-2	Ilkeston Town
74	Hednesford Town	3-1	Corby Town
75	Hendon	8-0	Flackwell Heath
76	Hinckley Athletic	3-1	Kidsgrove Athletic
77	Hoddesdon Town	0-2	Woodbridge Town
78	Horsham	0-5	Sittingbourne
79	Hyde United	6-0	Winterton Rangers
80	Knowsley United	0-0	Bradford Park Avenue
81	Lancaster City	2-1	Pickering Town
82	Langney Sports	1-3	Windsor & Eton
83	Leek Town	1-1	Clitheroe
84	Long Buckby	2-1	Sutton Coldfield Town
85	Lye Town	1-2	Eastwood Hanley
86	March Town United	0-3	Holbeach United
87	Marine	4-0	Louth United
88	Matlock Town	5-2	Great Harwood Town
89	Molesey	4-1	Whitstable Town
90	Morecambe	7-0	Sheffield
91	Morpeth Town	1-2	Whickham
92	Mossley	1-0	Hallam
93	Nantwich Town	3-0	Droylsden
94	Netherfield	2-4	Peterlee Newtown
95	Newcastle Town	5-0	Immingham Town
96	Newport A F C	5-0	Brockenhurst
97	Northwich Victoria	5-0	Burscough
98	Northwood	0-5	Uxbridge
99	Oxford City	1-1	Witney Town
100	Paget Rangers	1-0	Wednesfield
101	Paulton Rovers	1-1	Welton Rovers
102	Purfleet	4-0	Felixstowe Port & Town
103	Racing Club Warwick	1-0	Oldbury United
104	Raunds Town	3-0	Desborough Town
105	Raynes Park Vale	1-2	Banstead Athletic
106	Redditch United	1-3	Moor Green
107	Romford	1-0	Hadleigh United
108	Rossendale United	1-4	Colwyn Bay
109	Rushden & Diamonds	4-1	Grantham Town
110	Ryde	1-1	Weymouth
111	Saffron Walden Town	0-2	King's Lynn
112	Salisbury City	5-2	Hungerford Town
113	Saltash United	1-2	Taunton Town
114	Sandwell Borough	2-1	Cogenhoe United
115	Spennymoor United	1-0	Glasshoughton Welfare
116	St Albans City	4-1	Barton Rovers
117	Stafford Rangers	6-1	Rothwell Town
118	Stevenage Borough	0-0	Brook House
119	Stotfold	2-1	Hemel Hempstead
120	Stourbridge	2-2	Evesham United
121	Sudbury Town	3-0	Tiptree United
122	Sudbury Wanderers	3-1	Watton United
123	Telford United	4-0	Shifnal Town
124	Thame United	1-1	A F C Totton
125	Thatcham Town	5-1	Steyning Town
126	Tiverton Town	9-0	Barnstaple Town
127	Tooting & Mitcham United	0-0	Peacehaven & Telscombe
128	Tow Law Town	3-3	Chester-Le-Street Town
129	Trowbridge Town	8-1	Gosport Borough
130	Tuffley Rovers	0-4	Cinderford Town
131	Tufnell Park	2-2	Hertford Town
132	V S Rugby	1-2	Leicester United
133	Walton & Hersham	4-0	Camberley Town
134	Warrington Town	2-2	Trafford
135	Waterlooville	5-0	Calne Town
136	Welling United	2-0	Wick
137	Wembley	3-0	Langford
138	Whitby Town	0-1	Billingham Town
139	Whitley Bay	1-2	Workington
140	Wingate & Finchley	2-3	Ruislip Manor
141	Winsford United	1-0	Borrowash Victoria
142	Wokingham Town	3-1	Ringmer
143	Worksop Town	4-0	Radcliffe Borough
144	Worthing	1-1	Buckingham Town

=== Replays ===
Tie	Home team	Score	Away team
6	Armitage '90	3-3	Atherstone United
13	Elmore	2-6	Bideford
17	Boston Town	5-2	Bishop's Stortford
23	Thamesmead Town	2-3	Bracknell Town
30	Ramsgate	0-2	Chatham Town
33	Shoreham	1-3	Chertsey Town
34	Farsley Celtic	1-2	Chorley
38	Curzon Ashton	3-1	Crook Town
43	Wimborne Town	0-2	Dorchester Town
46	Blackpool Rovers	1-5	Durham City
54	Weston Super Mare	5-0	Falmouth Town
58	Prescot	2-2	Frickley Athletic
63	Wealdstone	4-3	Grays Athletic
80	Bradford Park Avenue	3-2	Knowsley United
83	Clitheroe	2-2	Leek Town
99	Witney Town	3-1	Oxford City
101	Welton Rovers	2-1	Paulton Rovers
110	Weymouth	2-1	Ryde
118	Brook House	1-4	Stevenage Borough
120	Evesham United	3-0	Stourbridge
124	A F C Totton	0-4	Thame United
127	Peacehaven & Telscombe	0-1	Tooting & Mitcham United
128	Chester-Le-Street Town	1-3	Tow Law Town
131	Hertford Town	5-1	Tufnell Park
134	Trafford	4-3	Warrington Town
144	Buckingham Town	0-0	Worthing

=== 2nd replays ===
Tie	Home team	Score	Away team
6	Armitage '90	5-3	Atherstone United
58	Prescot	0-1	Frickley Athletic
83	Clitheroe	0-0	Leek Town
144	Worthing	2-2	Buckingham Town

=== 3rd replays ===
Tie	Home team	Score	Away team
83	Leek Town	1-0	Clitheroe
144	Buckingham Town	6-1	Worthing

== 2nd qualifying round ==
=== Ties ===
Tie	Home team	Score	Away team
1	Accrington Stanley	1-2	Bradford Park Avenue
2	Arlesey Town	1-2	Sudbury Wanderers
3	Armitage '90	2-3	Solihull Borough
4	Ashford Town (Kent)	3-1	Hastings Town
5	Baldock Town	0-1	Hayes
6	Bamber Bridge	0-2	Mossley
7	Banstead Athletic	0-3	Bognor Regis Town
8	Bedlington Terriers	1-0	Whickham
9	Berkhamsted Town	1-2	Dagenham & Redbridge
10	Bideford	4-3	Taunton Town
11	Billericay Town	2-0	Great Yarmouth Town
12	Billingham Synthonia	0-2	Blyth Spartans
13	Billingham Town	1-0	West Auckland Town
14	Bishop Auckland	2-1	Tow Law Town
15	Boreham Wood	0-1	Staines Town
16	Bracknell Town	2-1	Harrow Borough
17	Burton Albion	1-1	Stafford Rangers
18	Canvey Island	2-0	Braintree Town
19	Carshalton Athletic	4-3	Windsor & Eton
20	Chorley	1-2	Colwyn Bay
21	Clapton	2-3	Hendon
22	Congleton Town	1-1	Hinckley Athletic
23	Denaby United	1-2	Hyde United
24	Dorchester Town	2-0	Basingstoke Town
25	Dulwich Hamlet	2-1	Chatham Town
26	Durham City	2-1	Guisborough Town
27	Emley	1-1	Winsford United
28	Erith & Belvedere	2-2	Sittingbourne
29	Evesham United	2-0	Bedworth United
30	Eynesbury Rovers	3-3	Wisbech Town
31	Fisher '93	1-4	Farnborough Town
32	Forest Green Rovers	3-0	Cheltenham Town
33	Frickley Athletic	2-4	Eastwood Town
34	Gainsborough Trinity	5-0	Nantwich Town
35	Gateshead	2-2	Barrow
36	Gloucester City	0-1	Cinderford Town
37	Guiseley	4-0	Leek Town
38	Halesowen Town	1-0	Moor Green
39	Hertford Town	1-0	Wealdstone
40	Holbeach United	0-0	Chelmsford City
41	King's Lynn	5-1	Boston Town
42	Lancaster City	3-0	Peterlee Newtown
43	Leicester United	3-2	Paget Rangers
44	Lincoln United	1-4	Northwich Victoria
45	Matlock Town	1-2	Ilkeston Town
46	Molesey	0-6	Gravesend & Northfleet
47	Newcastle Town	0-1	Marine
48	Newport A F C	3-3	Merthyr Tydfil
49	Purfleet	3-1	Chesham United
50	Racing Club Warwick	2-0	Long Buckby
51	Raunds Town	1-2	Telford United
52	Romford	4-1	Stotfold
53	Rushden & Diamonds	1-0	Eastwood Hanley
54	Salisbury City	1-3	Newport I O W
55	Sandwell Borough	2-1	Dudley Town
56	Sudbury Town	2-1	Heybridge Swifts
57	Tamworth	1-2	Hednesford Town
58	Thame United	1-1	Witney Town
59	Thatcham Town	0-1	Buckingham Town
60	Tooting & Mitcham United	2-2	Chertsey Town
61	Trafford	1-2	Curzon Ashton
62	Uxbridge	0-1	Stevenage Borough
63	Walton & Hersham	2-2	Margate
64	Welling United	2-2	Bromley
65	Welton Rovers	1-2	Trowbridge Town
66	Wembley	3-0	Ruislip Manor
67	Weston Super Mare	1-1	Tiverton Town
68	Weymouth	1-0	Waterlooville
69	Wokingham Town	1-2	Aldershot Town
70	Woodbridge Town	1-1	St Albans City
71	Workington	2-4	Spennymoor United
72	Worksop Town	2-3	Morecambe

=== Replays ===
Tie	Home team	Score	Away team
17	Stafford Rangers	2-3	Burton Albion
22	Hinckley Athletic	1-0	Congleton Town
27	Winsford United	2-1	Emley
28	Sittingbourne	6-1	Erith & Belvedere
30	Wisbech Town	6-1	Eynesbury Rovers
35	Barrow	1-0	Gateshead
40	Chelmsford City	3-1	Holbeach United
48	Merthyr Tydfil	1-2	Newport A F C
58	Witney Town	2-3	Thame United
60	Chertsey Town	1-2	Tooting & Mitcham United
63	Margate	0-1	Walton & Hersham
64	Bromley	3-3	Welling United
67	Tiverton Town	1-0	Weston Super Mare
70	St Albans City	2-0	Woodbridge Town

=== 2nd replay ===
Tie	Home team	Score	Away team
64	Welling United	1-2	Bromley

== 3rd qualifying round ==
=== Ties ===
Tie	Home team	Score	Away team
1	Barrow	1-1	Durham City
2	Bishop Auckland	0-1	Lancaster City
3	Blyth Spartans	3-1	Bedlington Terriers
4	Bognor Regis Town	4-2	Dulwich Hamlet
5	Bracknell Town	4-1	Wembley
6	Bradford Park Avenue	2-1	Curzon Ashton
7	Bromley	1-1	Sittingbourne
8	Buckingham Town	0-1	Aldershot Town
9	Burton Albion	2-0	Racing Club Warwick
10	Chelmsford City	1-1	Billericay Town
11	Dagenham & Redbridge	1-1	Purfleet
12	Farnborough Town	3-2	Walton & Hersham
13	Forest Green Rovers	1-1	Cinderford Town
14	Gravesend & Northfleet	2-1	Carshalton Athletic
15	Guiseley	6-1	Mossley
16	Hednesford Town	2-2	Solihull Borough
17	Hendon	0-3	Hayes
18	Hertford Town	0-2	Sudbury Wanderers
19	Hyde United	1-2	Colwyn Bay
20	King's Lynn	1-0	Canvey Island (tie awarded to Canvey Island)
21	Leicester United	0-1	Evesham United
22	Marine	0-0	Ilkeston Town
23	Morecambe	6-2	Gainsborough Trinity
24	Northwich Victoria	0-0	Eastwood Town
25	Sandwell Borough	1-6	Rushden & Diamonds
26	Spennymoor United	6-1	Billingham Town
27	St Albans City	3-1	Romford
28	Stevenage Borough	2-0	Staines Town
29	Telford United	4-1	Halesowen Town
30	Thame United	1-1	Newport I O W
31	Tiverton Town	4-1	Bideford
32	Tooting & Mitcham United	0-1	Ashford Town (Kent)
33	Trowbridge Town	2-0	Newport A F C
34	Weymouth	2-3	Dorchester Town
35	Winsford United	3-2	Hinckley Athletic
36	Wisbech Town	1-0	Sudbury Town

=== Replays ===
Tie	Home team	Score	Away team
1	Durham City	0-1	Barrow
7	Sittingbourne	3-2	Bromley
10	Billericay Town	2-1	Chelmsford City
11	Purfleet	2-1	Dagenham & Redbridge
13	Cinderford Town	1-1	Forest Green Rovers
16	Solihull Borough	1-2	Hednesford Town
22	Ilkeston Town	1-2	Marine
24	Eastwood Town	1-2	Northwich Victoria
30	Newport I O W	3-1	Thame United

=== 2nd replays ===
Tie	Home team	Score	Away team
13	Forest Green Rovers	1-3	Cinderford Town

== 4th qualifying round ==
The teams that given byes to this round are Macclesfield Town, Southport, Kettering Town, Halifax Town, Runcorn, Bath City, Bromsgrove Rovers, Stalybridge Celtic, Slough Town, Yeovil Town, Witton Albion, Sutton United, Crawley Town, Marlow, Nuneaton Borough, Aylesbury United, Hitchin Town, Yeading, Kingstonian and Bashley.

=== Ties ===
Tie	Home team	Score	Away team
1	Ashford Town (Kent)	2-0	Aldershot Town
2	Aylesbury United	1-3	Stevenage Borough
3	Billericay Town	1-1	Wisbech Town
4	Blyth Spartans	2-0	Guiseley
5	Burton Albion	3-1	Bracknell Town
6	Canvey Island	2-0	Hednesford Town
7	Cinderford Town	3-2	Bath City
8	Farnborough Town	2-1	Yeovil Town
9	Gravesend & Northfleet	1-1	Marlow
10	Hayes	4-0	Sudbury Wanderers
11	Hitchin Town	2-1	St Albans City
12	Kettering Town	0-0	Bromsgrove Rovers
13	Kingstonian	3-1	Trowbridge Town
14	Macclesfield Town	0-1	Northwich Victoria
15	Marine	2-0	Bradford Park Avenue
16	Newport I O W	1-1	Bashley
17	Nuneaton Borough	6-1	Evesham United
18	Purfleet	1-1	Rushden & Diamonds
19	Runcorn	2-1	Halifax Town
20	Sittingbourne	1-2	Dorchester Town
21	Spennymoor United	1-0	Lancaster City
22	Stalybridge Celtic	2-2	Colwyn Bay
23	Sutton United	4-1	Crawley Town
24	Telford United	3-0	Southport
25	Tiverton Town	1-4	Bognor Regis Town
26	Winsford United	0-3	Barrow
27	Witton Albion	3-2	Morecambe
28	Yeading	0-2	Slough Town

=== Replays ===
Tie	Home team	Score	Away team
3	Wisbech Town	2-0	Billericay Town
9	Marlow	3-3	Gravesend & Northfleet
12	Bromsgrove Rovers	2-2	Kettering Town
16	Bashley	2-3	Newport I O W
18	Rushden & Diamonds	3-1	Purfleet
22	Colwyn Bay	3-0	Stalybridge Celtic

=== 2nd replays ===
Tie	Home team	Score	Away team
9	Gravesend & Northfleet	4-0	Marlow
12	Kettering Town	1-2	Bromsgrove Rovers

== 1995-96 FA Cup ==
See 1995-96 FA Cup for details of the rounds from the first round proper onwards.
