= 1997–98 FA Cup qualifying rounds =

Tournament details
- Country: England; Wales

The 1997–98 FA Cup qualifying rounds opened the 117th season of competition in England for 'The Football Association Challenge Cup' (FA Cup), the world's oldest association football single knockout competition. A total of 563 clubs were accepted for the competition, down 11 from the previous season's 574.

The large number of clubs entering the tournament from lower down (Levels 5 through 8) in the English football pyramid meant that the competition started with five rounds of preliminary (1) and qualifying (4) knockouts for these non-League teams. The 28 winning teams from fourth round qualifying progressed to the First round proper, where League teams tiered at Levels 3 and 4 entered the competition.

== Calendar ==
| Round | Start date | New entries | Clubs |
|---|---|---|---|
| Preliminary round | Saturday 30 August 1997 | 318 | 563 → 404 |
| First round qualifying | Saturday 13 September 1997 | 129 | 404 → 260 |
| Second round qualifying | Saturday 27 September 1997 | none | 260 → 188 |
| Third round qualifying | Saturday 11 October 1997 | none | 188 → 152 |
| Fourth round qualifying | Saturday 25 October 1997 | 20 | 152 → 124 |
| First round proper | Saturday 15 November 1997 | 52 | 124 → 84 |
| Second round proper | Saturday 6 December 1997 | none | 84 → 64 |
| Third round proper | Saturday 3 January 1998 | 44 | 64 → 32 |
| Fourth round proper | Saturday 24 January 1998 | none | 32 → 16 |
| Fifth round proper | Saturday 14 February 1998 | none | 16 → 8 |
| Sixth round proper | Saturday 7 March 1998 | none | 8 → 4 |
| Semi-finals | Saturday 5 April 1998 | none | 4 → 2 |
| Final | Saturday 16 May 1998 | none | 2 → 1 |

== Preliminary round ==
=== Ties ===
| Tie | Home team | Score | Away team |
|---|---|---|---|
| 1 | A F C Lymington | 6-0 | Endsleigh |
| 2 | Abingdon Town | 1-1 | Devizes Town |
| 3 | Andover | 3-4 | Portsmouth Royal Navy |
| 4 | Arlesey Town | 2-1 | March Town United |
| 5 | Arnold Town | 3-1 | Shildon |
| 6 | Atherton Collieries | 1-2 | Maine Road |
| 7 | Atherton Laburnum Rovers | 0-1 | Hucknall Town |
| 8 | Banbury United | 3-2 | Rushall Olympic |
| 9 | Barking | 3-1 | Basildon United |
| 10 | Barnstaple Town | 1-4 | Carterton Town |
| 11 | Bashley | 9-0 | Torrington |
| 12 | Bedlington Terriers | 6-1 | Glapwell |
| 13 | Belper Town | 2-2 | Glossop North End |
| 14 | Billingham Synthonia | 1-1 | Brandon United |
| 15 | Billingham Town | 3-0 | Brodsworth Miners Welfare |
| 16 | Blackpool Rovers | 1-4 | Burscough |
| 17 | Blakenall | 1-3 | Great Yarmouth Town |
| 18 | Blidworth Welfare | 3-5 | Rossendale United |
| 19 | Bootle | 3-1 | Bradford Park Avenue |
| 20 | Borrowash Victoria | 1-2 | Jarrow Roofing Boldon Community Association |
| 21 | Boston Town | 0-2 | Stapenhill |
| 22 | Bournemouth F.C. | 2-4 | Gosport Borough |
| 23 | Brackley Town | 1-0 | Cogenhoe United |
| 24 | Bridgwater Town | 1-0 | Brislington |
| 25 | Bridport | 1-2 | Buckingham Town |
| 26 | Brigg Town | 1-0 | Eastwood Town |
| 27 | Buxton | 0-1 | Ilkeston Town |
| 28 | Castleton Gabriels | 0-1 | Clitheroe |
| 29 | Chatham Town | 0-7 | Banstead Athletic |
| 30 | Chester-Le-Street Town | 0-2 | Ryhope Community Association |
| 31 | Chippenham Town | 0-0 | Eastleigh |
| 32 | Cirencester Town | 3-4 | Tuffley Rovers |
| 33 | Clevedon Town | 4-0 | Bemerton Heath Harlequins |
| 34 | Congleton Town | 1-1 | Darwen |
| 35 | Corinthian Casuals | 0-2 | Aveley |
| 36 | Cove | 1-3 | Brockenhurst |
| 37 | Crook Town | 0-2 | Mossley |
| 38 | Croydon | 2-1 | Mile Oak |
| 39 | Croydon Athletic | 5-2 | Beaconsfield S Y C O B |
| 40 | Denaby United | 3-1 | West Auckland Town |
| 41 | Didcot Town | 1-5 | Taunton Town |
| 42 | Diss Town | 1-0 | Bloxwich Town |
| 43 | Droylsden | 4-1 | Cheadle Town |
| 44 | Dudley Town scr-w/o Bridgnorth Town | | |
| 45 | Eccleshill United | 1-1 | Thackley |
| 46 | Egham Town | 1-1 | Burnham |
| 47 | Elmore | 4-5 | Hungerford Town |
| 48 | Epsom & Ewell | 0-1 | Canterbury City |
| 49 | Erith Town | 0-3 | Harlow Town |
| 50 | Evenwood Town | 0-3 | Durham City |
| 51 | Eynesbury Rovers | 1-2 | Pershore Town |
| 52 | Fakenham Town | 0-1 | Stourbridge |
| 53 | Flackwell Heath | 5-0 | Barkingside |
| 54 | Fleet Town | 0-0 | Thame United |
| 55 | Flixton | 2-3 | Staveley Miners Welfare |
| 56 | Folkestone Invicta | 3-4 | Marlow |
| 57 | Ford United | 0-4 | Great Wakering Rovers |
| 58 | Frome Town | 0-5 | Wokingham Town |
| 59 | Glastonbury | 0-2 | Chard Town |
| 60 | Godalming & Guildford | 0-6 | Tonbridge Angels |
| 61 | Grays Athletic | 10-0 | Langford |
| 62 | Great Harwood Town | 2-1 | Stockton |
| 63 | Gretna | 4-2 | Haslingden |
| 64 | Guisborough Town | 2-3 | Worksop Town |
| 65 | Hailsham Town | 0-4 | Metropolitan Police |
| 66 | Halstead Town | 0-3 | Berkhamsted Town |
| 67 | Hanwell Town | 3-1 | Tring Town |
| 68 | Harrogate Railway Athletic | 2-3 | South Shields |
| 69 | Harrogate Town | 1-1 | Armthorpe Welfare |
| 70 | Hassocks | 1-2 | Barton Rovers |
| 71 | Hatfield Main | 2-3 | Dunston Federation Brewery |
| 72 | Heanor Town | 1-0 | Salford City |
| 73 | Hebburn | 0-5 | Garforth Town |
| 74 | Hillingdon Borough | 4-2 | Stotfold |
| 75 | Hinckley United | 2-0 | Wednesfield |
| 76 | Histon | 2-0 | Oldbury United |
| 77 | Hornchurch | 2-2 | Arundel |
| 78 | Horsham | 3-1 | Northwood |
| 79 | Horsham Y M C A | 2-4 | Dartford |
| 80 | Hythe United | 3-2 | Chalfont St Peter |
| 81 | Kidsgrove Athletic | 1-1 | Whitley Bay |
| 82 | Kingsbury Town | 1-2 | Portfield |
| 83 | Langney Sports | 2-1 | Southall |
| 84 | Leatherhead | 2-0 | Wealdstone |
| 85 | Leighton Town | 2-1 | Ashford Town (Middx) |
| 86 | Lewes | 0-1 | Tilbury |
| 87 | Littlehampton Town | 6-2 | Southend Manor |
| 88 | Liversedge | 3-0 | Willington |
| 89 | London Colney | 0-2 | Fisher Athletic London |
| 90 | Long Buckby | 2-4 | Boldmere St Michaels |
| 91 | Louth United | 1-0 | Glasshoughton Welfare |
| 92 | Lye Town | 2-1 | Evesham United |
| 93 | Maldon Town | 0-3 | Ruislip Manor |
| 94 | Maltby Main | 0-1 | Shotton Comrades |
| 95 | Matlock Town | 3-1 | Curzon Ashton |
| 96 | Melksham Town | 2-1 | Yate Town |
| 97 | Milton Keynes | 1-1 | Viking Sports |
| 98 | Minehead | 0-1 | Mangotsfield United |
| 99 | Morpeth Town | 5-0 | Horden Colliery Welfare |
| 100 | Netherfield | 1-1 | Chadderton |
| 101 | Newmarket Town | 4-4 | Stamford |
| 102 | Newport A F C | 2-1 | Maidenhead United |
| 103 | Northampton Spencer | 0-0 | Warboys Town |
| 104 | Oakwood | 2-1 | Potters Bar Town |
| 105 | Odd Down | 3-1 | Backwell United |
| 106 | Oldham Town | 4-2 | Northallerton |
| 107 | Pagham | 1-3 | Camberley Town |
| 108 | Parkgate | 2-0 | Nantwich Town |
| 109 | Paulton Rovers | 5-0 | Fareham Town |
| 110 | Peacehaven & Telscombe | 0-3 | Potton United |
| 111 | Pelsall Villa | 2-3 | Barwell |
| 112 | Penrith | 3-0 | Trafford |
| 113 | Peterlee Newtown | 1-3 | Warrington Town |
| 114 | Pontefract Collieries | 2-2 | Ossett Albion |
| 115 | Racing Club Warwick | 3-1 | St Neots Town |
| 116 | Raunds Town | 6-0 | Shifnal Town |
| 117 | Redditch United | 4-0 | Wellingborough Town |
| 118 | Redhill | 1-1 | Ware |
| 119 | Ringmer | 0-1 | Wick |
| | Rocester | 1-1 | West Midlands Police |
| 121 | Romford | 2-0 | Hertford Town |
| 122 | Royston Town | 0-0 | Shoreham |
| 123 | Sandwell Borough | 0-4 | Spalding United |
| 124 | Seaham Red Star | 1-1 | Ossett Town |
| 125 | Selby Town | 1-3 | Lincoln United |
| 126 | Selsey | 0-3 | Wembley |
| 127 | Sheppey United | 2-3 | Windsor & Eton |
| 128 | Skelmersdale United | 3-2 | Pickering Town |
| 129 | Slade Green | 1-1 | Erith & Belvedere |
| 130 | St Blazey | 1-0 | Trowbridge Town |
| 131 | St Helens Town | 3-1 | Sheffield |
| 132 | Stafford Rangers | 1-1 | Ely City |
| 133 | Stewart & Lloyds Corby | 1-1 | Soham Town Rangers |
| 134 | Stourport Swifts | 1-5 | Woodbridge Town |
| 135 | Stratford Town | 1-3 | Desborough Town |
| 136 | Sutton Coldfield Town | 1-3 | Stowmarket Town |
| 137 | Tadcaster Albion | 0-3 | Stocksbridge Park Steels |
| 138 | Thamesmead Town | 3-3 | Saltdean United |
| 139 | Three Bridges | 1-2 | Whitehawk |
| 140 | Tiptree United | 1-4 | Clapton |
| 141 | Tiverton Town | 2-0 | Weymouth |
| 142 | Tow Law Town | 1-2 | R T M Newcastle |
| 143 | Tunbridge Wells | 4-4 | Chichester City |
| 144 | V S Rugby | 1-0 | Chasetown |
| 145 | Waterlooville | 2-0 | Reading Town |
| 146 | Watton United scr-w/o Lowestoft Town | | |
| 147 | Welton Rovers | 1-5 | Calne Town |
| 148 | Welwyn Garden City | 2-3 | East Thurrock United |
| 149 | Westfields | 2-1 | Westbury United |
| 150 | Whitstable Town | 1-1 | Dorking |
| 151 | Willenhall Town | 4-1 | Gorleston |
| 152 | Wimborne Town | 3-2 | Falmouth Town |
| 153 | Wingate & Finchley | 1-1 | Corinthian |
| 154 | Witham Town | 1-1 | Deal Town |
| 155 | Wivenhoe Town | 4-0 | Chipstead |
| 156 | Wootton Blue Cross | 3-2 | Hemel Hempstead |
| 157 | Worthing | 8-1 | Eastbourne Town |
| 158 | Wroxham | 3-1 | Paget Rangers |
| 159 | Yorkshire Amateur | 1-4 | Easington Colliery |

=== Replays ===
| Tie | Home team | Score | Away team |
|---|---|---|---|
| 2 | Devizes Town | 0-3 | Abingdon Town |
| 13 | Glossop North End | 1-2 | Belper Town |
| 14 | Brandon United | 2-5 | Billingham Synthonia |
| 31 | Eastleigh | 0-1 | Chippenham Town |
| 34 | Darwen | 4-3 | Congleton Town |
| 45 | Thackley | 0-2 | Eccleshill United |
| 46 | Burnham | 1-1 | Egham Town |
(Burnham won 5-4 on penalties)
| 54 | Thame United | 1-3 | Fleet Town |
| 69 | Armthorpe Welfare | 1-3 | Harrogate Town |
| 77 | Arundel | 4-3 | Hornchurch |
| 81 | Whitley Bay | 3-3 | Kidsgrove Athletic |
(Whitley Bay won 5-3 on penalties)
| 97 | Viking Sports | 1-0 | Milton Keynes |
| 100 | Chadderton | 1-2 | Netherfield |
| 101 | Stamford | 1-4 | Newmarket Town |
| 103 | Warboys Town | 2-3 | Northampton Spencer |
| 114 | Ossett Albion | 0-3 | Pontefract Collieries |
| 118 | Ware | 4-1 | Redhill |
| 120 | West Midlands Police | 0-3 | Rocester |
| 122 | Shoreham | 2-1 | Royston Town |
| 124 | Ossett Town | 1-0 | Seaham Red Star |
| 129 | Erith & Belvedere | 5-3 | Slade Green |
| 132 | Ely City | 1-3 | Stafford Rangers |
| 133 | Soham Town Rangers | 1-3 | Stewart & Lloyds Corby |
| 138 | Saltdean United | 4-0 | Thamesmead Town |
| 143 | Chichester City | 4-1 | Tunbridge Wells |
| 150 | Dorking | 3-3 | Whitstable Town |
(Dorking won 3-1 on penalties)
| 153 | Corinthian | 0-2 | Wingate & Finchley |
| 154 | Deal Town | 3-0 | Witham Town |

== 1st qualifying round ==
=== Ties ===
| Tie | Home team | Score | Away team |
|---|---|---|---|
| 1 | Arundel | 1-4 | Erith & Belvedere |
| 2 | Ashington | 0-2 | Farsley Celtic |
| 3 | Aveley | 2-1 | Chichester City |
| 4 | Baldock Town | 0-0 | Slough Town |
| 5 | Bamber Bridge | 1-1 | Dunston Federation Brewery |
| 6 | Banstead Athletic | 2-2 | Camberley Town |
| 7 | Barking | 4-1 | Arlesey Town |
| 8 | Barton Rovers | 1-0 | Clapton |
| 9 | Barwell | 1-2 | Willenhall Town |
| 10 | Bedfont | 2-4 | Chesham United |
| 11 | Bedford Town | 1-1 | Dulwich Hamlet |
| 12 | Bedford United | 0-5 | Kingstonian |
| 13 | Berkhamsted Town | 1-1 | Deal Town |
| 14 | Bideford | 0-2 | Bath City |
| 15 | Billingham Synthonia | 0-0 | Maine Road |
| 16 | Billingham Town | 0-1 | Arnold Town |
| 17 | Boldmere St Michaels | 1-0 | Wroxham |
| 18 | Bootle | 2-3 | Belper Town |
| 19 | Bourne Town | 1-3 | King's Lynn |
| 20 | Brackley Town | 4-0 | Stapenhill |
| 21 | Bridgnorth Town | 1-1 | Desborough Town |
| 22 | Bridgwater Town | 1-1 | Abingdon Town |
| 23 | Brigg Town | 3-0 | Hucknall Town |
| 24 | Brimsdown Rovers | 1-2 | Canvey Island |
| 25 | Buckingham Town | 1-1 | Gosport Borough |
| 26 | Burgess Hill Town | 1-2 | Harrow Borough |
| 27 | Burnham | 1-3 | Dorking |
| 28 | Burnham Ramblers | 0-1 | Hastings Town |
| 29 | Burscough | 3-3 | Bedlington Terriers |
| 30 | Bury Town | 1-2 | Nuneaton Borough |
| 31 | Canterbury City | 1-1 | Worthing |
| 32 | Carterton Town | 0-1 | Portsmouth Royal Navy |
| 33 | Chertsey Town | 1-1 | Heybridge Swifts |
| 34 | Cheshunt | 0-4 | Sutton United |
| 35 | Chippenham Town | 3-2 | Bashley |
| 36 | Chorley | 3-1 | Pontefract Collieries |
| 37 | Clacton Town | 2-7 | Stansted |
| 38 | Clevedon Town | 1-1 | Calne Town |
| 39 | Clitheroe | 4-3 | Jarrow Roofing Boldon Community Association |
| 40 | Concord Rangers | 0-1 | Purfleet |
| 41 | Croydon | 2-1 | Horsham |
| 42 | Croydon Athletic | 0-4 | Wivenhoe Town |
| 43 | Darwen | 1-2 | Ryhope Community Association |
| 44 | Denaby United | 2-3 | Ossett Town |
| 45 | Diss Town | 0-1 | V S Rugby |
| 46 | Downton | 0-4 | Forest Green Rovers |
| 47 | Eccleshill United | 1-2 | Parkgate |
| 48 | Edgware Town | 2-5 | Aylesbury United |
| 49 | Felixstowe Port & Town | 2-5 | Halesowen Town |
| 50 | Fisher Athletic London | 5-0 | Wootton Blue Cross |
| 51 | Flackwell Heath | 1-0 | East Thurrock United |
| 52 | Frickley Athletic | 3-3 | Morpeth Town |
| 53 | Gateshead | 2-0 | Matlock Town |
| 54 | Gloucester City | 3-0 | Mangotsfield United |
| 55 | Gravesend & Northfleet | 3-3 | Braintree Town |
| 56 | Great Harwood Town | 1-1 | St Helens Town |
| 57 | Great Wakering Rovers | 1-2 | Grays Athletic |
| 58 | Great Yarmouth Town | 2-1 | Banbury United |
| 59 | Gretna | 3-0 | Mossley |
| 60 | Guiseley | 3-0 | Alfreton Town |
| 61 | Halesowen Harriers | 0-1 | Grantham Town |
| 62 | Halifax Town | 4-1 | Droylsden |
| 63 | Hanwell Town | 3-2 | Saltdean United |
| 64 | Harlow Town | 0-2 | Metropolitan Police |
| 65 | Harrogate Town | 2-2 | Easington Colliery |
| 66 | Harwich & Parkeston | 1-1 | Carshalton Athletic |
| 67 | Havant Town | 1-1 | Basingstoke Town |
| 68 | Heanor Town | 1-2 | Penrith |
| 69 | Herne Bay | 1-2 | Dartford |
| 70 | Hillingdon Borough | 0-2 | Windsor & Eton |
| 71 | Hinckley United | 5-0 | Stewart & Lloyds Corby |
| 72 | Histon | 1-3 | Newmarket Town |
| 73 | Hitchin Town | 0-2 | Bognor Regis Town |
| 74 | Holbeach United | 3-6 | Gresley Rovers |
| 75 | Hungerford Town | 1-4 | Fleet Town |
| 76 | Hyde United | 3-0 | Louth United |
| 77 | Hythe United | 4-7 | Romford |
| 78 | Ilkeston Town | 3-0 | Rossendale United |
| 79 | Kettering Town | 1-0 | Mirrlees Blackstone |
| 80 | Knowsley United scr-w/o Durham City | | |
| 81 | Knypersley Victoria | 1-0 | Atherstone United |
| 82 | Lancaster City | 2-2 | Consett |
| 83 | Langney Sports | 2-1 | Leatherhead |
| 84 | Leigh R M I | 1-0 | Accrington Stanley |
| 85 | Leighton Town | 1-2 | Wingate & Finchley |
| 86 | Liversedge | 3-3 | Stocksbridge Park Steels |
| 87 | Lye Town | 2-3 | Lowestoft Town |
| 88 | Margate | 5-0 | Bracknell Town |
| 89 | Marine | 1-0 | Ashton United |
| 90 | Marlow | 2-2 | Littlehampton Town |
| 91 | Melksham Town | 1-2 | Waterlooville |
| 92 | Merthyr Tydfil | 7-1 | Brockenhurst |
| 93 | Moor Green | 0-2 | Bilston Town |
| 94 | Newcastle Town | 3-5 | Garforth Town |
| 95 | Newport I O W | 2-1 | Aldershot Town |
| 96 | North Ferriby United | 2-1 | Barrow |
| 97 | Northampton Spencer | 1-1 | Woodbridge Town |
| 98 | Oakwood | 0-1 | Potton United |
| 99 | Odd Down | 1-4 | Wimborne Town |
| 100 | Oxford City | 1-1 | Dorchester Town |
| 101 | Pershore Town | 0-7 | Stourbridge |
| 102 | Portfield | 2-1 | Viking Sports |
| 103 | Racing Club Warwick | 1-2 | Redditch United |
| 104 | Radcliffe Borough | 1-3 | Bishop Auckland |
| 105 | Raunds Town | 2-4 | Spalding United |
| 106 | Rocester | 3-2 | Stowmarket Town |
| 107 | Rothwell Town | 2-1 | Corby Town |
| 108 | Ruislip Manor | 4-1 | Shoreham |
| 109 | Salisbury City | 3-0 | Chard Town |
| 110 | Shepshed Dynamo | 0-3 | Cambridge City |
| 111 | Sittingbourne | 5-0 | Molesey |
| 112 | Solihull Borough | 2-0 | Burton Albion |
| 113 | South Shields | 3-0 | Skelmersdale United |
| 114 | Spennymoor United | 1-1 | Blyth Spartans |
| 115 | St Blazey | 0-2 | Tiverton Town |
| 116 | St Leonards Stamcroft | 1-0 | Bishop's Stortford |
| 117 | Staines Town | 3-1 | Bromley |
| 118 | Staveley Miners Welfare | 1-5 | Lincoln United |
| 119 | Sudbury Wanderers | 3-0 | Stafford Rangers |
| 120 | Tamworth | 1-2 | Bromsgrove Rovers |
| 121 | Taunton Town | 3-2 | Newport A F C |
| 122 | Telford United | 1-2 | Bedworth United |
| 123 | Thatcham Town | 0-1 | Cheltenham Town |
| 124 | Tilbury | 3-1 | Wick |
| 125 | Tonbridge Angels | 1-0 | Ware |
| 126 | Tooting & Mitcham United | 1-2 | Billericay Town |
| 127 | Tuffley Rovers | 1-3 | Paulton Rovers |
| 128 | Uxbridge | 0-2 | Dover Athletic |
| 129 | Walton & Hersham | 2-0 | Hampton |
| 130 | Warrington Town | 1-2 | R T M Newcastle |
| 131 | Welling United | 3-0 | Leyton Pennant |
| 132 | Wembley | 3-1 | Whitehawk |
| 133 | Weston Super Mare | 0-0 | Cinderford Town |
| 134 | Whitby Town | 6-2 | Netherfield |
| 135 | Whitley Bay | 0-0 | Shotton Comrades |
| 136 | Whyteleafe | 3-2 | Crawley Town |
| 137 | Winsford United | 1-0 | Leek Town |
| 138 | Witton Albion | 0-5 | Gainsborough Trinity |
| 139 | Wokingham Town | 1-1 | Westfields |
| 140 | Worcester City | 3-2 | A F C Lymington |
| 141 | Workington | 0-3 | Emley |
| 142 | Worksop Town | 4-2 | Oldham Town |
| 143 | Yeading | 4-2 | Chelmsford City |
| 144 | Yeovil Town | 1-1 | Witney Town |

=== Replays ===
| Tie | Home team | Score | Away team |
|---|---|---|---|
| 4 | Slough Town | 5-0 | Baldock Town |
| 5 | Dunston Federation Brewery | 2-3 | Bamber Bridge |
| 6 | Camberley Town | 2-1 | Banstead Athletic |
| 11 | Dulwich Hamlet | 2-0 | Bedford Town |
| 13 | Deal Town | 2-1 | Berkhamsted Town |
| 15 | Maine Road | 2-2 | Billingham Synthonia |
(Maine Road won 5-3 on penalties)
| 21 | Desborough Town | 1-3 | Bridgnorth Town |
| 22 | Abingdon Town | 1-2 | Bridgwater Town |
| 25 | Gosport Borough | 1-2 | Buckingham Town |
| 29 | Bedlington Terriers | 1-2 | Burscough |
| 31 | Worthing | 4-1 | Canterbury City |
| 33 | Heybridge Swifts | 2-1 | Chertsey Town |
| 38 | Calne Town | 2-1 | Clevedon Town |
| 52 | Morpeth Town | 4-1 | Frickley Athletic |
| 55 | Braintree Town | 3-1 | Gravesend & Northfleet |
| 56 | St Helens Town | 3-1 | Great Harwood Town |
| 65 | Easington Colliery | 4-1 | Harrogate Town |
| 66 | Carshalton Athletic | 4-0 | Harwich & Parkeston |
| 67 | Basingstoke Town | 2-0 | Havant Town |
| 82 | Consett | 1-2 | Lancaster City |
| 86 | Stocksbridge Park Steels | 2-3 | Liversedge |
| 90 | Littlehampton Town | 2-2 | Marlow |
(Marlow won 11-10 on penalties)
| 97 | Woodbridge Town | 3-1 | Northampton Spencer |
| 100 | Dorchester Town | 1-0 | Oxford City |
| 114 | Blyth Spartans | 1-0 | Spennymoor United |
| 133 | Cinderford Town | 0-1 | Weston Super Mare |
| 135 | Shotton Comrades | 1-0 | Whitley Bay |
| 139 | Westfields | 1-3 | Wokingham Town |
| 144 | Witney Town | 1-2 | Yeovil Town |

== 2nd qualifying round ==
=== Ties ===
| Tie | Home team | Score | Away team |
|---|---|---|---|
| 1 | Arnold Town | 2-0 | Shotton Comrades |
| 2 | Aylesbury United | 0-3 | Carshalton Athletic |
| 3 | Bamber Bridge | 1-2 | Marine |
| 4 | Barking | 3-0 | Hanwell Town |
| 5 | Basingstoke Town | 1-1 | Bath City |
| 6 | Bedworth United | 1-1 | Nuneaton Borough |
| 7 | Belper Town | 2-2 | Parkgate |
| 8 | Billericay Town | 2-1 | Dulwich Hamlet |
| 9 | Bilston Town | 1-2 | King's Lynn |
| 10 | Bognor Regis Town | 2-1 | Hastings Town |
| 11 | Brackley Town | 0-0 | Rocester |
| 12 | Braintree Town | 3-0 | Chesham United |
| 13 | Bridgwater Town | 2-4 | Paulton Rovers |
| 14 | Brigg Town | 1-1 | Worksop Town |
| 15 | Buckingham Town | 0-2 | Taunton Town |
| 16 | Burscough | 1-4 | Ossett Town |
| 17 | Chippenham Town | 1-1 | Wokingham Town |
| 18 | Chorley | 2-2 | Bishop Auckland |
| 19 | Clitheroe | 1-3 | Lincoln United |
| 20 | Croydon | 2-0 | Aveley |
| 21 | Dartford | 1-2 | Staines Town |
| 22 | Dorchester Town | 1-0 | Forest Green Rovers |
| 23 | Dover Athletic | 0-4 | Kingstonian |
| 24 | Durham City | 0-5 | Emley |
| 25 | Fleet Town | 2-3 | Calne Town |
| 26 | Garforth Town | 0-1 | Blyth Spartans |
| 27 | Gateshead | 1-4 | Gainsborough Trinity |
| 28 | Gloucester City | 2-1 | Newport I O W |
| 29 | Grays Athletic | 1-2 | Camberley Town |
| 30 | Gretna | 3-1 | Liversedge |
| 31 | Guiseley | 0-0 | Farsley Celtic |
| 32 | Halifax Town | 4-0 | Leigh R M I |
| 33 | Hinckley United | 2-0 | Great Yarmouth Town |
| 34 | Hyde United | 4-1 | Lancaster City |
| 35 | Ilkeston Town | 7-1 | R T M Newcastle |
| 36 | Kettering Town | 1-1 | Cambridge City |
| 37 | Knypersley Victoria | 3-1 | Gresley Rovers |
| 38 | Langney Sports | 3-0 | Dorking |
| 39 | Margate | 4-0 | Harrow Borough |
| 40 | Marlow | 2-3 | Flackwell Heath |
| 41 | Merthyr Tydfil | 0-2 | Cheltenham Town |
| 42 | Metropolitan Police | 2-2 | Wivenhoe Town |
| 43 | Morpeth Town | 0-0 | North Ferriby United |
| 44 | Newmarket Town | 1-2 | V S Rugby |
| 45 | Penrith | 6-3 | Easington Colliery |
| 46 | Portfield | 1-1 | Deal Town |
| 47 | Portsmouth Royal Navy | 1-1 | Waterlooville |
| 48 | Potton United | 1-6 | Romford |
| 49 | Redditch United | 3-1 | Willenhall Town |
| 50 | Rothwell Town | 1-1 | Halesowen Town |
| 51 | Ruislip Manor | 0-0 | Erith & Belvedere |
| 52 | Ryhope Community Association | 2-0 | St Helens Town |
| 53 | Salisbury City | 2-2 | Weston Super Mare |
| 54 | Sittingbourne | 2-1 | Purfleet |
| 55 | Solihull Borough | 2-1 | Grantham Town |
| 56 | South Shields | 2-0 | Maine Road |
| 57 | Spalding United | 2-1 | Lowestoft Town |
| 58 | St Leonards Stamcroft | 2-0 | Canvey Island |
| 59 | Stourbridge | 2-1 | Bridgnorth Town |
| 60 | Sudbury Wanderers | 1-1 | Bromsgrove Rovers |
| 61 | Tilbury | 3-0 | Wingate & Finchley |
| 62 | Tiverton Town | 11-1 | Wimborne Town |
| 63 | Tonbridge Angels | 3-0 | Worthing |
| 64 | Walton & Hersham | 0-0 | Slough Town |
| 65 | Welling United | 2-2 | Sutton United |
| 66 | Wembley | 1-3 | Fisher Athletic London |
| 67 | Whitby Town | 1-4 | Winsford United |
| 68 | Whyteleafe | 0-2 | Heybridge Swifts |
| 69 | Windsor & Eton | 2-5 | Barton Rovers |
| 70 | Woodbridge Town | 4-2 | Boldmere St Michaels |
| 71 | Worcester City | 1-2 | Yeovil Town |
| 72 | Yeading | 3-0 | Stansted |

=== Replays ===
| Tie | Home team | Score | Away team |
|---|---|---|---|
| 5 | Bath City | 1-3 | Basingstoke Town |
| 6 | Nuneaton Borough | 6-1 | Bedworth United |
| 7 | Parkgate | 0-2 | Belper Town |
| 11 | Rocester | 2-1 | Brackley Town |
| 14 | Worksop Town | 3-1 | Brigg Town |
| 17 | Wokingham Town | 0-1 | Chippenham Town |
| 18 | Bishop Auckland | 2-3 | Chorley |
| 31 | Farsley Celtic | 1-4 | Guiseley |
| 36 | Cambridge City | 2-4 | Kettering Town |
| 42 | Wivenhoe Town | 2-1 | Metropolitan Police |
| 43 | North Ferriby United | 1-0 | Morpeth Town |
| 46 | Deal Town | 2-1 | Portfield |
| 47 | Waterlooville | 7-0 | Portsmouth Royal Navy |
| 50 | Halesowen Town | 4-1 | Rothwell Town |
| 51 | Erith & Belvedere | 3-0 | Ruislip Manor |
| 53 | Weston Super Mare | 2-2 | Salisbury City |
(Salisbury City won 4-3 on penalties)
| 60 | Bromsgrove Rovers | 2-0 | Sudbury Wanderers |
| 64 | Slough Town | 0-0 | Walton & Hersham |
(Slough Town won 3-2 on penalties)
| 65 | Sutton United | 2-1 | Welling United |

== 3rd qualifying round ==
=== Ties ===
| Tie | Home team | Score | Away team |
|---|---|---|---|
| 1 | Basingstoke Town | 0-0 | Calne Town |
| 2 | Billericay Town | 4-1 | Erith & Belvedere |
| 3 | Blyth Spartans | 4-0 | Worksop Town |
| 4 | Bognor Regis Town | 1-1 | Croydon |
| 5 | Braintree Town | 4-1 | Barton Rovers |
| 6 | Bromsgrove Rovers | 2-1 | Rocester |
| 7 | Carshalton Athletic | 1-0 | Fisher Athletic London |
| 8 | Cheltenham Town | 5-0 | Paulton Rovers |
| 9 | Chorley | 1-3 | Ilkeston Town |
| 10 | Dorchester Town | 0-1 | Tiverton Town |
| 11 | Emley | 2-1 | Belper Town |
| 12 | Gainsborough Trinity | 3-2 | South Shields |
| 13 | Gloucester City | 2-0 | Waterlooville |
| 14 | Guiseley | 1-2 | Penrith |
| 15 | Halesowen Town | 2-2 | Redditch United |
| 16 | Halifax Town | 5-0 | Ossett Town |
| 17 | Heybridge Swifts | 4-0 | Flackwell Heath |
| 18 | Hyde United | 8-0 | Ryhope Community Association |
| 19 | Kettering Town | 0-1 | Hinckley United |
| 20 | King's Lynn | 4-3 | V S Rugby |
| 21 | Kingstonian | 1-0 | Wivenhoe Town |
| 22 | Knypersley Victoria | 3-1 | Spalding United |
| 23 | Margate | 2-1 | Deal Town |
| 24 | Marine | 1-1 | Lincoln United |
| 25 | North Ferriby United | 2-0 | Gretna |
| 26 | Nuneaton Borough | 4-1 | Stourbridge |
| 27 | Salisbury City | 3-0 | Taunton Town |
| 28 | Sittingbourne | 2-1 | Langney Sports |
| 29 | Slough Town | 6-1 | Tilbury |
| 30 | Solihull Borough | 6-0 | Woodbridge Town |
| 31 | St Leonards Stamcroft | 1-3 | Camberley Town |
| 32 | Staines Town | 3-1 | Barking |
| 33 | Sutton United | 5-1 | Tonbridge Angels |
| 34 | Winsford United | 1-1 | Arnold Town |
| 35 | Yeading | 0-2 | Romford |
| 36 | Yeovil Town | 4-0 | Chippenham Town |

=== Replays ===
| Tie | Home team | Score | Away team |
|---|---|---|---|
| 1 | Calne Town | 1-2 | Basingstoke Town |
| 4 | Croydon | 2-2 | Bognor Regis Town |
(Bognor Regis Town won 3-1 on penalties)
| 15 | Redditch United | 0-3 | Halesowen Town |
| 24 | Lincoln United | 4-1 | Marine |
| 34 | Arnold Town | 0-0 | Winsford United |
(Winsford United won 7-6 on penalties)

== 4th qualifying round ==
The teams that given byes to this round are Hereford United, Kidderminster Harriers, Morecambe, Northwich Victoria, Farnborough Town, Southport, Rushden & Diamonds, Stalybridge Celtic, Hayes, Altrincham, Runcorn, Ashford Town (Kent), Colwyn Bay, Boston United, Enfield, St Albans City, Boreham Wood, Hendon, Wisbech Town and Sudbury Town.

=== Ties ===
| Tie | Home team | Score | Away team |
|---|---|---|---|
| 1 | Altrincham | 0-2 | Morecambe |
| 2 | Basingstoke Town | 5-1 | Braintree Town |
| 3 | Billericay Town | 1-1 | Camberley Town |
| 4 | Blyth Spartans | 2-1 | Kidderminster Harriers |
| 5 | Bognor Regis Town | 0-0 | Farnborough Town |
| 6 | Bromsgrove Rovers | 2-0 | Romford |
| 7 | Cheltenham Town | 1-0 | Sutton United |
| 8 | Enfield | 1-2 | Carshalton Athletic |
| 9 | Gainsborough Trinity | 2-1 | Halifax Town |
| 10 | Gloucester City | 1-1 | Wisbech Town |
| 11 | Halesowen Town | 0-2 | Northwich Victoria |
| 12 | Heybridge Swifts | 5-2 | Ashford Town (Kent) |
| 13 | Hinckley United | 1-2 | Colwyn Bay |
| 14 | Ilkeston Town | 3-2 | Hyde United |
| 15 | King's Lynn | 5-0 | Salisbury City |
| 16 | Knypersley Victoria | 0-1 | Boston United |
| 17 | Nuneaton Borough | 2-3 | Emley |
| 18 | Runcorn | 1-2 | Lincoln United |
| 19 | Rushden & Diamonds | 1-1 | Boreham Wood |
| 20 | Sittingbourne | 2-2 | Hereford United |
| 21 | Slough Town | 2-1 | Kingstonian |
| 22 | Southport | 2-0 | North Ferriby United |
| 23 | St Albans City | 1-2 | Hendon |
| 24 | Staines Town | 0-3 | Margate |
| 25 | Stalybridge Celtic | 3-3 | Solihull Borough |
| 26 | Tiverton Town | 5-0 | Sudbury Town |
| 27 | Winsford United | 2-0 | Penrith |
| 28 | Yeovil Town | 1-1 | Hayes |

=== Replays ===
| Tie | Home team | Score | Away team |
|---|---|---|---|
| 3 | Camberley Town | 0-1 | Billericay Town |
| 5 | Farnborough Town | 2-1 | Bognor Regis Town |
| 10 | Wisbech Town | 3-2 | Gloucester City |
| 19 | Boreham Wood | 1-0 | Rushden & Diamonds |
| 20 | Hereford United | 3-0 | Sittingbourne |
| 25 | Solihull Borough | 4-3 | Stalybridge Celtic |
| 28 | Hayes | 1-0 | Yeovil Town |

== 1997–98 FA Cup ==
See 1997–98 FA Cup for details of the rounds from the first round proper onwards.
