= John Doolan (footballer, born 1968) =

English footballer and coach

Personal information
- Date of birth: 10 November 1968 (age 58)
- Place of birth: Liverpool, England
- Height: 5 ft 10 in (1.78 m)
- Position: Defender

Team information
- Current team: Accrington Stanley (manager)

Senior career*
| Years | Team | Apps | (Gls) |
- Knowsley United
- Mossley
- Knowsley United
| 1992–1996 | Wigan Athletic | 38 | (1) |
- Barrow
- Ashton United
- Accrington Stanley

Managerial career
- 2024–: Accrington Stanley
- * Club domestic league appearances and goals

John Doolan (born 10 November 1968) is an English football ex-player and coach. He is manager of EFL League Two club Accrington Stanley.

Born in Liverpool, he played for Wigan Athletic between 1992 and 1996. Having worked at both Liverpool and Everton Academies he was appointed as Wigan's youth team coach in November 2011, following the departure of Dave Watson. In December 2013, Doolan joined the first team coaching staff following the arrival of Uwe Rosler the club made the playoffs and reached the semifinal of the F.A Cup losing to Arsenal on penalties.

In July 2014, he moved to Scottish club Hibernian as first team coach and Assistant Manager to Allan Stubbs. Lifting the Scottish Cup in a 3–2 win against Rangers, the first time the club had achieved this piece of silverware in 114 years.

On 1 June 2016, he and Hibs manager Alan Stubbs moved to Rotherham United. Following a poor run of form, Stubbs was sacked by Rotherham on 19 October 2016 and Doolan also left the club.

In July 2017, he returned to his former club Accrington as the first team coach. Doolan helped them win promotion from EFL League Two going up as Champions in his first season back.

In March 2024, he was appointed interim manager of Accrington Stanley. On 22 March 2024, he was given a three-year permanent contract having picked up four points from three matches in interim charge.

== Managerial statistics ==
As of match played 21 November 2026

Managerial record by team and tenure
| Team | From | To | Record | | | | |
| Team | From | To | P | W | D | L | Win % |
|---|---|---|---|---|---|---|---|
| Accrington Stanley | 4 March 2024 | Present | 138 | 40 | 40 | 58 | 29.0 |
| Total | | | 138 | 40 | 40 | 58 | 29.0 |
