= 1981–82 FA Cup qualifying rounds =

Tournament details
- Country: England; Wales

The FA Cup 1981–82 is the 101st season of the world's oldest football knockout competition; The Football Association Challenge Cup, or FA Cup for short. The large number of clubs entering the tournament from lower down the English football league system meant that the competition started with a number of preliminary and qualifying rounds. The 28 victorious teams from the fourth round qualifying progressed to the first round proper.

== Preliminary round ==
=== Ties ===
Tie	Home team	Score	Away team
1	Abingdon Town	1–2	Hendon
2	Accrington Stanley	2–1	South Liverpool
3	Alfreton Town	5–0	Ashby Institute
4	Almondsbury Greenway	1–1	Wellington (Somerset)
5	Appleby Frodingham{1}	2–2	Buxton
6	Arundel	1–4	Wick
7	Barnstaple Town	3–1	Tiverton Town
8	Barry Town	2–0	Ton Pentre
9	Bedford Town	4–0	Hoddesdon Town
10	Billericay Town	1–0	Tiptree United
11	Bilston	0–0	Rushall Olympic
12	Blakenall	1–1	Desborough Town
13	Blue Star	0–0	Whitley Bay
14	Bognor Regis Town	5–1	Haywards Heath
15	Boldon Community Association	1–5	Tow Law Town
16	Boston	5–0	Holbeach United
17	Brereton Social	0–3	Tamworth
18	Bridgend Town	6–0	Paulton Rovers
19	Bridlington Town	1–3	Thackley
20	Bridlington Trinity	3–1	Winterton Rangers
21	Bridport	5–0	Ottery St Mary
22	Burgess Hill Town	4–0	Molesey
23	Burnham	3–4	Newbury Town
24	Bury Town	2–0	Spalding United
25	Chatham Town	1–4	Hastings United
26	Chatteris Town	3–1	Felixstowe Town
27	Chertsey Town	2–5	Lewes
28	Chester-Le-Street	1–0	West Auckland Town
29	Chichester City	1–5	Poole Town
30	Cinderford Town	1–2	Llanelli
31	Clandown	1–3	Gloucester City
32	Clapton	1–0	Whyteleafe
33	Clitheroe	0–1	Netherfield
34	Colwyn Bay	3–3	Matlock Town
35	Congleton Town	0–2	Belper Town
36	Croydon	1–0	Ringmer
37	Dartford	2–2	Redhill
38	Didcot Town w/o-scr Willesden		
39	Dorking Town	0–2	Basingstoke Town
40	Dudley Town	3–0	Stourbridge
41	Eastbourne United	0–2	Tonbridge
42	Eastwood Town	3–0	Friar Lane Old Boys
43	Edgware Town	3–1	Staines Town
44	Egham Town	1–1	Marlow
45	Erith & Belvedere	2–1	Rainham Town
46	Falmouth Town	2–2	Penzance
47	Farsley Celtic	1–1	Mexborough Town Athletic
48	Gorleston	2–0	Chelmsford City
49	Great Yarmouth Town	4–0	Saffron Walden Town
50	Gresley Rovers	2–1	Redditch United
51	Guisborough Town	3–1	Shildon
52	Heanor Town	1–3	Worksop Town
53	Hednesford Town	3–0	Moor Green
54	Histon	1–4	Leyton Wingate
55	Horsham Y M C A	1–1	Uxbridge
56	Horwich R M I	4–0	Skelmersdale United
57	Hounslow	1–3	Kingstonian
58	Hungerford Town	4–0	Chippenham Town
59	Irthlingborough Diamonds	2–1	Harefield United
60	Lancaster City	3–1	Percy Main Amateurs
61	Long Eaton United	1–3	Halesowen Town
62	March Town United	1–1	Soham Town Rangers
63	Marine	2–0	Prestwich Heys
64	Metropolitan Police	1–2	Worthing
65	Pagham	3–0	Waterlooville
66	Peterlee Newtown	0–2	South Bank
67	Prescot Cables	4–1	St Helens Town
68	Rhyl	0–1	Winsford United
69	Shifnal Town	5–0	New Mills{1}
70	Southwick	0–1	Thanet United
71	Steyning Town	0–0	Three Bridges
72	Sudbury Town	3–3	Epping Town
73	Telford United	4–0	Oswestry Town
74	Thame United	1–0	Haringey Borough
75	Tividale	3–0	Milton Keynes City
76	Wallsend Town	1–4	Evenwood Town
77	Wellingborough Town w/o-scr Brierley Hill Alliance		
78	Whitstable Town	2–2	Sheppey United
79	Willington	0–0	Eppleton Colliery Welfare
80	Witton Albion	3–1	Macclesfield Town
81	Woking	1–0	Newport I O W
82	Wootton Blue Cross	2–2	Slough Town

=== Replays ===
Tie	Home team	Score	Away team
4	Wellington (Somerset)	3–0	Almondsbury Greenway
5	Buxton	3–0	Appleby Frodingham{1}
11	Rushall Olympic	1–3	Bilston
12	Desborough Town	2–6	Blakenall
13	Whitley Bay	3–1	Blue Star
34	Matlock Town	2–2	Colwyn Bay
37	Redhill	1–0	Dartford
44	Marlow	1–1	Egham Town
46	Penzance	2–2	Falmouth Town
47	Mexborough Town Athletic	2–1	Farsley Celtic
55	Uxbridge	2–1	Horsham Y M C A
62	Soham Town Rangers	0–4	March Town United
71	Three Bridges	1–3	Steyning Town
72	Epping Town	2–4	Sudbury Town
78	Sheppey United	1–2	Whitstable Town
79	Eppleton Colliery Welfare	0–2	Willington
82	Slough Town	4–2	Wootton Blue Cross

=== 2nd replays ===
Tie	Home team	Score	Away team
34	Colwyn Bay	1–4	Matlock Town
44	Egham Town	7–4	Marlow
46	Falmouth Town	1–0	Penzance

== 1st qualifying round ==
=== Ties ===
Tie	Home team	Score	Away team
1	Addlestone & Weybridge Town	3–1	Ruislip Manor
2	Alvechurch	2–0	Evesham United
3	Ampthill Town	0–1	Hendon
4	Annfield Plain	2–3	Durham City
5	Armitage	0–2	Nantwich Town
6	Arnold	1–2	Alfreton Town
7	Ashford Town (Kent)	1–0	Hastings Town
8	Ashington	4–2	Crook Town
9	Ashton United	1–1	Lytham
10	Aveley	1–1	Welling United
11	Aylesbury United	0–1	Feltham
12	Banbury United	2–1	Hemel Hempstead
13	Bangor City	6–0	Glossop
14	Banstead Athletic	2–0	Horsham
15	Barton Rovers	1–0	Haverhill Rovers
16	Barton Town	1–3	Buxton
17	Basildon United	1–2	Walthamstow Avenue
18	Basingstoke Town	2–1	Tooting & Mitcham United
19	Bath City	3–0	Mangotsfield United
20	Belper Town	0–6	Telford United
21	Berkhamsted Town	0–3	Hampton
22	Bideford	4–1	St Blazey
23	Bilston	2–3	Halesowen Town
24	Bishop Auckland	4–0	Ossett Albion
25	Boston	0–0	Gainsborough Trinity
26	Boston United	2–1	Sutton Town
27	Bourne Town	1–2	North Ferriby United
28	Bracknell Town	1–2	Wokingham Town
29	Bridgwater Town	2–0	Wellington (Somerset)
30	Bridlington Trinity	2–0	Denaby United
31	Bridport	2–2	Liskeard Athletic
32	Brigg Town	0–0	Curzon Ashton
33	Bromley	0–5	Fareham Town
34	Bromsgrove Rovers	2–0	Blakenall
35	Burscough	4–0	Darwen
36	Burton Albion	3–1	Coventry Sporting
37	Calne Town	1–2	Bridgend Town
38	Camberley Town	0–2	Newbury Town
39	Cambridge City	1–1	Bury Town
40	Chard Town	1–2	Barnstaple Town
41	Chatteris Town	3–3	Ely City
42	Cheltenham Town	4–0	Barry Town
43	Cheshunt	2–2	Lewes
44	Chorley	0–0	Accrington Stanley
45	Clacton Town	1–0	Ware
46	Clevedon Town	3–1	Welton Rovers
47	Corby Town	2–1	Enderby Town
48	Corinthian Casuals	3–3	Clapton
49	Crawley Town	0–1	Burgess Hill Town
50	Cray Wanderers	0–4	Billericay Town
51	Croydon w/o-scr Bexhill Town		
52	Darlaston	1–2	Tamworth
53	Devizes Town	1–0	Shepton Mallet Town
54	Dover	4–1	Folkestone
55	Droylsden	1–0	Southport
56	Dudley Town	0–2	Malvern Town
57	Eastbourne Town	0–2	Canterbury City
58	Eastleigh	2–1	Poole Town
59	Edgware Town	1–3	Thame United
60	Egham Town	1–2	Maidenhead United
61	Emley	2–1	Thackley
62	Epsom & Ewell	2–1	Herne Bay
63	Erith & Belvedere	2–2	Leytonstone Ilford
64	Falmouth Town	2–0	Newquay
65	Farnborough Town	5–0	Horndean
66	Ferryhill Athletic	2–2	Chester-Le-Street
67	Finchley	4–3	Sittingbourne
68	Fleetwood Town	1–1	Hyde United
69	Frickley Athletic	2–0	Whitby Town
70	Frome Town	2–1	Trowbridge Town
71	Gateshead	1–1	Spennymoor United
72	Glastonbury	3–1	Weston Super Mare
73	Gloucester City	2–1	Forest Green Rovers
74	Gosport Borough	0–1	Melksham Town
75	Grantham	1–0	Eastwood Town
76	Great Yarmouth Town	3–2	Parson Drove United
77	Gresley Rovers	1–1	Racing Club Warwick
78	Guisborough Town	2–3	Seaham Red Star
79	Harrow Borough	4–2	Oxford City
80	Harwich & Parkeston	1–2	Wisbech Town
81	Hastings United	5–0	Faversham Town
82	Hayes	1–1	Tilbury
83	Hednesford Town	1–1	Bedworth United
84	Heybridge Swifts	2–1	Gorleston
85	Highgate United	2–2	Kempston Rovers
86	Hillingdon Borough	7–2	Tunbridge Wells
87	Hitchin Town	1–2	Southall
88	Horden Colliery Welfare	1–1	Brandon United
89	Hornchurch	0–0	Woodford Town
90	Horwich R M I	2–0	Witton Albion
91	Hungerford Town	1–2	Dorchester Town
92	Ilkeston Town	2–0	Hinckley Athletic
93	Ilminster Town	0–2	Torrington
94	Irthlingborough Diamonds	1–0	Chesham United
95	Kidderminster Harriers	1–2	Shepshed Charterhouse
96	King's Lynn	0–0	Thetford Town
97	Kingstonian	2–0	Boreham Wood
98	Lancaster City	1–0	Billingham Synthonia
99	Littlehampton Town	0–3	Carshalton Athletic
100	Llanelli	1–2	Haverfordwest County
101	Lowestoft Town	1–0	Stamford
102	Lye Town	2–1	Wellingborough Town
103	March Town United	1–0	St Neots Town
104	Marine	4–0	Formby
105	Matlock Town	1–1	Shifnal Town
106	Mexborough Town Athletic	1–6	Goole Town
107	Morecambe	2–3	Consett
108	Netherfield	3–2	Leyland Motors
109	Newmarket Town	1–0	Letchworth Garden City
110	North Shields	2–1	Wingate (Durham)
111	Nuneaton Borough	6–0	Rushden Town
112	Oldbury United	0–2	Willenhall Town
113	Pagham	2–1	Andover
114	Penrith	2–1	Rossendale United
115	Potton United	1–1	Bedford Town
116	Prescot Cables	3–1	Bootle
117	Redhill	1–2	Hertford Town
118	Rothwell Town	1–3	Tring Town
119	Runcorn	3–0	Leek Town
120	Slough Town	2–1	Chalfont St Peter
121	South Bank	3–2	Barrow
122	St Albans City	2–1	Grays Athletic
123	Stalybridge Celtic	2–1	Yorkshire Amateur
124	Steyning Town	1–1	Dulwich Hamlet
125	Stowmarket	2–3	Leyton Wingate
126	Sudbury Town	1–1	Dunstable
127	Sutton Coldfield Town	2–1	Buckingham Town
128	Taunton Town	1–0	Saltash United
129	Thanet United	2–2	Deal Town
130	Tividale	3–0	Walsall Wood
131	Tonbridge	3–1	Whitstable Town
132	Tow Law Town	4–2	Evenwood Town
133	Uxbridge	2–2	Peacehaven & Telscombe
134	V S Rugby	5–0	Wolverton Town
135	Wealdstone	4–0	Salisbury
136	Wembley	2–1	East Grinstead
137	Whitley Bay	3–1	Willington
138	Wick	2–1	Woking
139	Windsor & Eton	3–4	Walton & Hersham
140	Winsford United	2–3	Caernarfon Town
141	Witney Town	3–0	Didcot Town
142	Worcester City	5–2	Moreton Town
143	Worksop Town	2–1	Skegness Town
144	Worthing	0–0	Bognor Regis Town

=== Replays ===
Tie	Home team	Score	Away team
9	Lytham	3–1	Ashton United
10	Welling United	1–1	Aveley
25	Gainsborough Trinity	1–2	Boston
31	Liskeard Athletic	3–1	Bridport
32	Curzon Ashton	4–1	Brigg Town
39	Bury Town	1–1	Cambridge City
41	Ely City	2–1	Chatteris Town
43	Lewes	3–3	Cheshunt
44	Accrington Stanley	0–0	Chorley
48	Clapton	1–2	Corinthian Casuals
63	Leytonstone Ilford	3–0	Erith & Belvedere
66	Chester-Le-Street	2–1	Ferryhill Athletic
68	Hyde United	2–1	Fleetwood Town
71	Spennymoor United	3–0	Gateshead
77	Racing Club Warwick	1–3	Gresley Rovers
82	Tilbury	0–0	Hayes
83	Bedworth United	3–0	Hednesford Town
85	Kempston Rovers	1–2	Highgate United
88	Brandon United	1–3	Horden Colliery Welfare
89	Woodford Town	2–1	Hornchurch
96	Thetford Town	0–1	King's Lynn
105	Shifnal Town	2–0	Matlock Town
115	Bedford Town	4–1	Potton United
124	Dulwich Hamlet	3–0	Steyning Town
126	Dunstable	3–1	Sudbury Town
129	Deal Town	2–1	Thanet United
133	Peacehaven & Telscombe	1–3	Uxbridge
144	Bognor Regis Town	1–0	Worthing

=== 2nd replays ===
Tie	Home team	Score	Away team
10	Aveley	0–0	Welling United
39	Cambridge City	1–2	Bury Town
43	Cheshunt	0–2	Lewes
44	Chorley	4–0	Accrington Stanley
82	Hayes	0–0	Tilbury

=== 3rd replays ===
Tie	Home team	Score	Away team
10	Welling United	3–2	Aveley
82	Tilbury	1–1	Hayes

=== 4th replay ===
Tie	Home team	Score	Away team
82	Hayes	4–0	Tilbury

== 2nd qualifying round ==
=== Ties ===
Tie	Home team	Score	Away team
1	Alfreton Town	0–2	Boston United
2	Barnstaple Town	0–1	Bideford
3	Basingstoke Town	4–2	Hillingdon Borough
4	Bedford Town	2–0	Barton Rovers
5	Bedworth United	0–1	Alvechurch
6	Billericay Town	3–1	Welling United
7	Bognor Regis Town	0–0	Addlestone & Weybridge Town
8	Boston	1–2	North Ferriby United
9	Bridgend Town	1–3	Worcester City
10	Bridgwater Town	1–1	Taunton Town
11	Bridlington Trinity	0–1	Curzon Ashton
12	Bromsgrove Rovers	1–0	Sutton Coldfield Town
13	Burgess Hill Town	2–1	Walton & Hersham
14	Bury Town	0–5	King's Lynn
15	Buxton	1–0	Stalybridge Celtic
16	Caernarfon Town	3–2	Bangor City
17	Cheltenham Town	2–2	Bath City
18	Chester-Le-Street	1–1	Spennymoor United
19	Chorley	0–1	Penrith
20	Corinthian Casuals	2–1	Hayes
21	Croydon	1–1	Epsom & Ewell
22	Deal Town	1–2	Ashford Town (Kent)
23	Dorchester Town	3–0	Frome Town
24	Dulwich Hamlet	1–2	Fareham Town
25	Dunstable	3–2	Walthamstow Avenue
26	Eastleigh	3–1	Melksham Town
27	Ely City	2–1	Clacton Town
28	Emley	1–4	Bishop Auckland
29	Falmouth Town	1–0	Torrington
30	Gloucester City	2–4	Devizes Town
31	Goole Town	2–3	Frickley Athletic
32	Grantham	0–1	Corby Town
33	Great Yarmouth Town	3–1	Lowestoft Town
34	Gresley Rovers	3–3	Willenhall Town
35	Halesowen Town	0–0	Burton Albion
36	Hastings United	4–1	Canterbury City
37	Haverfordwest County	3–2	Clevedon Town
38	Hendon	2–2	Banbury United
39	Hertford Town	4–3	Finchley
40	Heybridge Swifts	2–2	Wisbech Town
41	Horwich R M I	0–4	Hyde United
42	Irthlingborough Diamonds	1–1	Tring Town
43	Kingstonian	1–0	Hampton
44	Lancaster City	1–3	Ashington
45	Lewes	1–2	Wembley
46	Leyton Wingate	2–2	St Albans City
47	Leytonstone Ilford	2–1	Woodford Town
48	Liskeard Athletic	2–0	Glastonbury
49	Lye Town	1–2	Nuneaton Borough
50	Maidenhead United	0–2	Harrow Borough
51	Malvern Town	2–1	Highgate United
52	March Town United	5–5	Newmarket Town
53	Marine	0–0	Lytham
54	Netherfield	1–1	Droylsden
55	Newbury Town	1–6	Wealdstone
56	Pagham	2–2	Banstead Athletic
57	Prescot Cables	1–1	Nantwich Town
58	Seaham Red Star	0–1	North Shields
59	Shifnal Town	0–3	Runcorn
60	Slough Town	1–5	Wokingham Town
61	South Bank	4–1	Durham City
62	Tamworth	2–2	Shepshed Charterhouse
63	Telford United	3–0	Burscough
64	Thame United	1–1	Feltham
65	Tividale	2–2	V S Rugby
66	Tonbridge	2–2	Dover
67	Tow Law Town	1–4	Horden Colliery Welfare
68	Uxbridge	0–3	Carshalton Athletic
69	Whitley Bay	1–0	Consett
70	Wick	2–2	Farnborough Town
71	Witney Town	4–1	Southall
72	Worksop Town	2–3	Ilkeston Town

=== Replays ===
Tie	Home team	Score	Away team
7	Addlestone & Weybridge Town	2–0	Bognor Regis Town
10	Taunton Town	1–0	Bridgwater Town
17	Bath City	1–2	Cheltenham Town
18	Spennymoor United	1–0	Chester-Le-Street
21	Epsom & Ewell	4–0	Croydon
34	Willenhall Town	3–1	Gresley Rovers
35	Burton Albion	2–0	Halesowen Town
38	Banbury United	3–4	Hendon
40	Wisbech Town	2–1	Heybridge Swifts
42	Tring Town	1–0	Irthlingborough Diamonds
46	St Albans City	4–1	Leyton Wingate
52	Newmarket Town	0–2	March Town United
53	Lytham	2–6	Marine
54	Droylsden	3–1	Netherfield
56	Banstead Athletic	7–1	Pagham
57	Nantwich Town	0–1	Prescot Cables
62	Shepshed Charterhouse	2–0	Tamworth
64	Feltham	1–2	Thame United
65	V S Rugby	0–2	Tividale
66	Dover	5–2	Tonbridge
70	Farnborough Town	3–0	Wick

== 3rd qualifying round ==
=== Ties ===
Tie	Home team	Score	Away team
1	Addlestone & Weybridge Town	2–0	Fareham Town
2	Bedford Town	1–0	Ely City
3	Bideford	1–0	Falmouth Town
4	Billericay Town	0–0	Leytonstone Ilford
5	Bishop Auckland	3–0	Frickley Athletic
6	Boston United	4–0	North Ferriby United
7	Bromsgrove Rovers	4–1	Malvern Town
8	Burgess Hill Town	1–5	Carshalton Athletic
9	Burton Albion	2–0	Alvechurch
10	Buxton	4–1	Curzon Ashton
11	Cheltenham Town	4–0	Haverfordwest County
12	Corby Town	8–1	Ilkeston Town
13	Corinthian Casuals	2–0	Hertford Town
14	Dover	2–1	Ashford Town (Kent)
15	Eastleigh	2–4	Dorchester Town
16	Epsom & Ewell	2–4	Hastings United
17	Farnborough Town	4–0	Banstead Athletic
18	Hendon	4–0	Tring Town
19	Horden Colliery Welfare	0–0	Ashington
20	Hyde United	3–1	Marine
21	King's Lynn	5–1	Great Yarmouth Town
22	Nuneaton Borough	5–2	Tividale
23	Penrith	3–2	Droylsden
24	Runcorn	4–1	Prescot Cables
25	Shepshed Charterhouse	1–5	Willenhall Town
26	Spennymoor United	2–2	North Shields
27	St Albans City	1–5	Dunstable
28	Taunton Town	2–1	Liskeard Athletic
29	Telford United	1–2	Caernarfon Town
30	Thame United	1–2	Kingstonian
31	Wealdstone	1–4	Harrow Borough
32	Wembley	5–1	Basingstoke Town
33	Whitley Bay	0–2	South Bank
34	Wisbech Town	2–1	March Town United
35	Witney Town	2–0	Wokingham Town
36	Worcester City	4–1	Devizes Town

=== Replays ===
Tie	Home team	Score	Away team
4	Leytonstone Ilford	1–0	Billericay Town
19	Ashington	1–3	Horden Colliery Welfare
16	North Shields	1–5	Spennymoor United

== 4th qualifying round ==
The teams that given byes to this round are Kettering Town, Scarborough, Northwich Victoria, Weymouth, Maidstone United, Stafford Rangers, Yeovil Town, Gravesend & Northfleet, A P Leamington, Barnet, Dagenham, Mossley, Leatherhead, Wycombe Wanderers, Workington, Minehead, Blyth Spartans, Merthyr Tydfil, Barking and Harlow Town.

=== Ties ===
Tie	Home team	Score	Away team
1	Addlestone & Weybridge Town	2–2	Taunton Town
2	Barnet	2–0	Corinthian Casuals
3	Bedford Town	3–0	Wisbech Town
4	Bideford	1–0	Kingstonian
5	Boston United	3–1	Dunstable
6	Caernarfon Town	0–2	Bishop Auckland
7	Cheltenham Town	1–3	Dorchester Town
8	Dover	1–1	Leatherhead
9	Gravesend & Northfleet	0–0	Dagenham
10	Harlow Town	1–0	Corby Town
11	Hastings United	2–0	Wembley
12	Hendon	2–1	Harrow Borough
13	Horden Colliery Welfare	2–0	Hyde United
14	Kettering Town	2–1	King's Lynn
15	Leytonstone Ilford	2–0	Carshalton Athletic
16	Maidstone United	0–1	Barking
17	Minehead	1–0	Worcester City
18	Nuneaton Borough	2–1	Bromsgrove Rovers
19	Penrith	1–0	Northwich Victoria
20	Scarborough	2–3	Blyth Spartans
21	South Bank	0–1	Mossley
22	Spennymoor United	0–1	Runcorn
23	Stafford Rangers	3–0	A P Leamington
24	Weymouth	3–0	Farnborough Town
25	Willenhall Town	2–1	Burton Albion
26	Witney Town	0–1	Wycombe Wanderers
27	Workington	4–1	Buxton
28	Yeovil Town	3–0	Merthyr Tydfil

=== Replays ===
Tie	Home team	Score	Away team
1	Taunton Town	0–0	Addlestone & Weybridge Town
8	Leatherhead	0–1	Dover
9	Dagenham	6–3	Gravesend & Northfleet

=== 2nd replay ===
Tie	Home team	Score	Away team
1	Taunton Town	4–2	Addlestone & Weybridge Town

== 1981–82 FA Cup ==
See 1981-82 FA Cup for details of the rounds from the first round proper onwards.
