= Black Cow Vodka =

Brand of British alcoholic drink

- Type: Vodka
- Origin: West Dorset, United Kingdom
- Introduced: West Dorset, 2012
- Alcohol by volume: 40%
- Proof (US): 80
- Website: Black Cow Vodka

Black Cow is a brand of vodka manufactured in West Dorset, England. It was created by Jason Barber, a dairy farmer from West Dorset. The vodka is made using whey, a byproduct of cheesemaking.

== Product ==
Black Cow was created by Jason Barber and Paul Archard, through a trial and error process that they claim took about five years. Barber claims he had been inspired by the drink Araka, an alcoholic form of fermented mare's milk allegedly used by Genghis Khan and his armies. Araka, which is still made today, is approximately 7% ABV and more akin to a beer.

The vodka is made using whey, as it is high in lactose and sugars to convert to alcohol with a specific yeast that will react with lactose. The product is triple filtered, including through a carbon made from coconut husk. After distillation, the product comes out at 48% ABV, at which point they process the liquid into Black Cow Vodka. The final concentration of the product is 40% ABV. In total, 20 litres (4.4 imp gal; 5.3 US gal) of milk are required to make 1 litre (0.22 imp gal; 0.26 US gal) of vodka.

The curds from the same milk are used to make 1833 cheddar and Black Cow Deluxe Cheddar, two other products from the same dairy farm, meaning that there is very little waste between the two processes. Due to their unique process, the brand claims to be the only vodka in the world made entirely from milk products. Black Cow Vodka has made deals to be stocked in Sainsbury's, Marks & Spencer and Majestic Wine, under the Pure Milk Vodka Company. In 2016, the company produced 120,000 bottles.

== Awards ==
Black Cow Vodka won a gold medal at the San Francisco World Spirit Competition in 2015. The vodka is championed by the likes of Mark Hix, Hugh Fearnley-Whittingstall and Kirstie Allsopp.

== Advertising ==
In 2017, Black Cow Vodka had three of its adverts banned by the Advertising Standards Authority. One advert was a shot for shot parody of the 1989 "Accrington Stanley, Who Are They?" milk advert, including the original actor, Carl Rice. However, the ASA stated the advert encouraged excessive drinking. Barber embraced the additional publicity the complaint gave the vodka. Indeed, the adverts being banned led to an increase in sales and BBC coverage in Countryfile and Farming Today.
