= 1999–2000 Chester City F.C. season =

Chester City
1999–2000 season
- Manager: Kevin Ratcliffe; Terry Smith; Ian Atkins
- Stadium: Deva Stadium
- Football League Third Division: 24th (relegated)
- FA Cup: Round 3
- Football League Cup: Round 2
- Football League Trophy: Round 2
- Top goalscorer: League: Luke Beckett (14); All: Luke Beckett (19)
- Highest home attendance: 5,507 vs Wrexham (30 October)
- Lowest home attendance: 1,705 vs Hull City (28 March)
- Average home league attendance: 2,686; 20th in division

The 1999–2000 season was the 62nd season of competitive association football in the Football League played by Chester City, an English club based in Chester, Cheshire.

Also, it was the fifth season spent in the Third Division, after the relegation from the Second Division in 1995. Alongside competing in the Football League the club also participated in the FA Cup, the Football League Cup and the Football League Trophy.

== Football League ==
Pos	Team	Pld	W	D	L	GF	GA	GD	Pts	Promotion or relegation
20	York City	46	12	16	18	39	53	−14	52	
21	Exeter City	46	11	11	24	46	72	−26	44	
22	Shrewsbury Town	46	9	13	24	40	67	−27	40	
23	Carlisle United	46	9	12	25	42	75	−33	39	
24	Chester City (R)	46	10	9	27	44	79	−35	39	Relegation to Football Conference

Rules for classification: 1) Points; 2) Goal difference; 3) Goals scored
(R) Relegated

=== Results summary ===
Overall								Home						Away					
Pld	W	D	L	GF	GA	GD	Pts	W	D	L	GF	GA	GD	W	D	L	GF	GA	GD
46	10	9	27	44	79	−35	39	5	5	13	20	36	−16	5	4	14	24	43	−19

Source: rsssf.com

=== Results by matchday ===
Round	1	2	3	4	5	6	7	8	9	10	11	12	13	14	15	16	17	18	19	20	21	22	23	24	25	26	27	28	29	30	31	32	33	34	35	36	37	38	39	40	41	42	43	44	45	46
Result	L	L	L	D	L	D	D	W	L	D	L	L	W	L	W	L	L	D	L	L	L	W	L	L	L	L	L	L	W	L	D	L	L	W	D	D	L	D	W	W	L	W	D	W	L	L
Position	23	23	24	23	24	24	24	24	24	24	24	24	24	24	23	23	24	24	24	24	24	23	23	24	24	24	24	24	24	24	24	24	24	24	23	23	24	24	24	24	24	23	24	22	23	24

Source: 11v11.com
W = Win; D = Draw; L = Loss

=== Matches ===
Date	Opponents	Venue	Result	Score	Scorers	Attendance
7 August	Barnet	H	L	0–2		2,234
14 August	Rotherham United	A	L	0–4		2,966
18 August	Northampton Town	H	L	0–2		1,904
28 August	Torquay United	A	D	2–2	Beckett, Berry	2,345
30 August	Rochdale	H	L	0–2		2,644
3 September	Hull City	A	L	1–2	Richardson	6,137
11 September	Exeter City	H	D	1–1	Beckett	1,855
18 September	Brighton & Hove Albion	A	W	3–2	Beckett, Watson (o.g.), Agogo	5,810
25 September	Lincoln City	H	L	1–3	Blackwood	2,161
2 October	York City	A	D	2–2	Blackwood, Agogo	2,452
9 October	Peterborough United	A	L	1–2	Beckett	4,965
16 October	Macclesfield Town	H	L	1–2	Agogo	2,506
19 October	Cheltenham Town	H	W	2–1	Agogo (2)	1,705
23 October	Lincoln City	A	L	1–4	Agogo	3,790
2 November	Shrewsbury Town	A	W	1–0	Richardson	2,523
6 November	Plymouth Argyle	H	L	0–1		2,027
13 November	Hartlepool United	A	L	0–1		2,266
23 November	Southend United	H	D	0–0		1,906
27 November	Swansea City	H	L	0–1		2,713
4 December	Barnet	A	L	0–2		2,252
15 December	Darlington	A	L	1–3	Samways (o.g.)	3,553
18 December	Halifax Town	H	W	2–1	Laird, Eve	2,037
26 December	Mansfield Town	A	L	1–2	Doughty	3,234
28 December	Leyton Orient	H	L	1–5	Wright	3,160
3 January	Carlisle United	A	L	1–4	Eve	4,565
8 January	Darlington	H	L	1–2	Beckett	2,067
15 January	Rotherham United	H	L	0–2		2,398
22 January	Northampton Town	A	L	1–3	Pickering	5,332
29 January	Torquay United	H	W	2–1	Eyjólfsson, Beckett	2,229
5 February	Rochdale	A	L	1–2	Beckett	3,093
12 February	Hull City	H	D	0–0		2,802
18 February	Swansea City	A	L	1–2	Eyjólfsson	6,336
26 February	Brighton & Hove Albion	H	L	1–7	Beckett	2,743
4 March	Exeter City	A	W	2–0	Eyjólfsson, Beckett	2,391
7 March	Plymouth Argyle	A	D	0–0		4,140
11 March	Shrewsbury Town	H	D	0–0		4,002
18 March	Southend United	A	L	1–3	Beckett	3,483
21 March	Hartlepool United	H	D	1–1	Hemmings	1,816
25 March	Mansfield Town	H	W	5–0	Heggs, Beckett, Hemmings, Eve	1,953
1 April	Halifax Town	A	W	1–0	Beckett (pen)	2,431
8 April	Carlisle United	H	L	0–1		5,507
15 April	Leyton Orient	A	W	2–1	Heggs, Fisher	4,123
22 April	Macclesfield Town	A	D	1–1	Beckett	3,456
24 April	York City	H	W	2–0	Bower (o.g.), Beckett	3,503
29 April	Cheltenham Town	A	L	0–1		5,391
6 May	Peterborough United	H	L	0–1		4,905

== FA Cup ==
Round	Date	Opponents	Venue	Result	Score	Scorers	Attendance
First round	30 October	Whyteleafe (7)	A	D	0–0		2,164
First round replay	9 November	Whyteleafe (7)	H	W	3–1	Cross (2), Beckett	2,183
Second round	20 November	Stalybridge Celtic (6)	A	W	2–1	Cross, Beckett	3,312
Third round	12 December	Manchester City (2)	H	L	1–4	Richardson	5,469

== League Cup ==
Round	Date	Opponents	Venue	Result	Score	Scorers	Attendance
First round first leg	10 August	Port Vale (2)	H	W	2–1	Richardson, Beckett (pen)	2,102
First round second leg	24 August	Port Vale (2)	A	D	4–4	Beckett (2, 1pen), Shelton, Jones	2,625
Second round first leg	14 September	Aston Villa (1)	H	L	0–1		4,364
Second round second leg	21 September	Aston Villa (1)	A	L	0–5		22,163

== Football League Trophy ==
Round	Date	Opponents	Venue	Result	Score	Scorers	Attendance
Second round	11 January	Hull City (4)	A	L	0–2		1,680

== Season statistics ==
Nat	Player	Total		League		FA Cup		League Cup		FL Trophy	
Nat	Player	A	G	A	G	A	G	A	G	A	G
Goalkeepers
(England)	Wayne Brown	55	–	46	–	4	–	4	–	1	–
Field players
(Ghana)	Junior Agogo	10	6	10	6	–	–	–	–	–	–
(England)	Luke Beckett	55	19	46	14	4	2	4	3	1	–
(England)	Paul Berry	0+12	1	0+9	1	0+1	–	0+2	–	–	–
(England)	Chris Blackburn	0+1	–	0+1	–	–	–	–	–	–	–
(England)	Michael Blackwood	9	2	9	2	–	–	–	–	–	–
(England)	Paul Carden	9+2	–	9+2	–	–	–	–	–	–	–
(England)	Danny Carson	0+1	–	–	–	–	–	–	–	0+1	–
(United States)	Joe Carver	1+1	–	1+1	–	–	–	–	–	–	–
(England)	Jonathan Cross	18+5	3	13+4	–	2+1	3	2	–	1	–
(England)	Ross Davidson	13	–	9	–	–	–	4	–	–	–
(England)	Matt Doughty	25+14	1	19+14	1	4	–	2	–	–	–
(Iceland)	Sigurður Ragnar Eyjólfsson	10	3	9	3	–	–	–	–	1	–
(Trinidad and Tobago)	Angus Eve	9+6	4	9+5	4	–	–	–	–	0+1	–
(England)	Steve Finney	4+9	–	4+9	–	–	–	–	–	–	–
(England)	Neil Fisher	43+7	1	34+7	1	4	–	4	–	1	–
(England)	Carl Heggs	11	2	11	2	–	–	–	–	–	–
(England)	Tony Hemmings	19	2	19	2	–	–	–	–	–	–
(England)	Stuart Hicks	13	–	13	–	–	–	–	–	–	–
(England)	Gary Hobson	20	–	20	–	–	–	–	–	–	–
(Wales)	Jonathan Jones	5+5	1	4+2	–	0+1	–	1+2	1	–	–
(Sierra Leone)	John Keister	9+2	–	8+2	–	–	–	–	–	1	–
(Trinidad and Tobago)	Kamu Laird	2+1	1	2+1	1	–	–	–	–	–	–
(England)	Martyn Lancaster	19+4	–	14+3	–	1+1	–	3	–	1	–
(Scotland)	Steve Malone	1	–	–	–	1	–	–	–	–	–
(Serbia)	Goran Milosavijevic	17+1	–	11+1	–	3	–	2	–	1	–
(Wales)	Darren Moss	34+8	–	28+7	–	4	–	1+1	–	1	–
(Canada)	Martin Nash	15+5	–	12+4	–	3+1	–	–	–	–	–
(England)	Ally Pickering	7	1	7	1	–	–	–	–	–	–
(England)	Andy Porter	16	–	16	–	–	–	–	–	–	–
(England)	Shaun Reid	15+3	–	10+3	–	2	–	2	–	1	–
(England)	Nick Richardson	40+5	4	31+5	2	4	1	4	1	1	–
(England)	Jamie Robinson	9	–	9	–	–	–	–	–	–	–
(England)	Andy Shelton	14+5	1	9+2	–	1+2	–	4	1	0+1	–
(England)	Nicky Spooner	11	–	9	–	2	–	–	–	–	–
(England)	Matt Woods	46+3	–	40+2	–	2+1	–	4	–	–	–
(England)	Darren Wright	21+11	1	15+10	1	3	–	3	–	0+1	–
	Own goals	–	3	–	3	–	–	–	–	–	–
	Total	55	56	46	44	4	6	4	6	1	–
