= 1998–99 Chester City F.C. season =

Chester City
1998–99 season
- Manager: Kevin Ratcliffe
- Stadium: Deva Stadium
- Football League Third Division: 14th
- FA Cup: Round 1
- Football League Cup: Round 2
- Football League Trophy: Round 1
- Top goalscorer: League: John Murphy (12); All: Luke Beckett (13)
- Highest home attendance: 3,926 vs Swansea City (17 October)
- Lowest home attendance: 1,729 vs Torquay United (12 September)
- Average home league attendance: 2,562; 21st in division

The 1998–99 season was the 61st season of competitive association football in the Football League played by Chester City, an English club based in Chester, Cheshire.

Also, it was the fourth season spent in the Third Division, after the relegation from the Second Division in 1995. Alongside competing in the Football League the club also participated in the FA Cup, the Football League Cup and the Football League Trophy.

== Football League ==
Pos	Team	Pld	W	D	L	GF	GA	GD	Pts
12	Exeter City	46	17	12	17	47	50	−3	63
13	Plymouth Argyle	46	17	10	19	58	54	+4	61
14	Chester City	46	13	18	15	57	66	−9	57
15	Shrewsbury Town	46	14	14	18	52	63	−11	56
16	Barnet	46	14	13	19	54	71	−17	55

Rules for classification: 1) Points; 2) Goals scored; 3) Goal difference

=== Results summary ===
Overall								Home						Away					
Pld	W	D	L	GF	GA	GD	Pts	W	D	L	GF	GA	GD	W	D	L	GF	GA	GD
46	13	18	15	57	66	−9	57	6	12	5	28	30	−2	7	6	10	29	36	−7

Source: rsssf.com

=== Results by matchday ===
Round	1	2	3	4	5	6	7	8	9	10	11	12	13	14	15	16	17	18	19	20	21	22	23	24	25	26	27	28	29	30	31	32	33	34	35	36	37	38	39	40	41	42	43	44	45	46
Result	L	D	D	W	L	W	L	W	D	D	W	D	D	D	D	L	L	D	L	W	W	W	D	D	D	D	L	L	D	W	W	L	W	D	L	L	L	W	D	W	L	L	L	D	W	D
Position	20	21	21	12	17	14	17	13	16	16	10	11	11	13	13	17	19	19	19	17	14	14	15	14	16	14	16	17	19	17	16	16	14	14	14	15	16	15	14	13	13	15	17	17	14	14

Source: 11v11.com
W = Win; D = Draw; L = Loss

=== Matches ===
Date	Opponents	Venue	Result	Score	Scorers	Attendance
8 August	Leyton Orient	H	L	0–2		2,541
15 August	Brighton & Hove Albion	A	D	2–2	Smith, Flitcroft (pen)	2,703
23 August	Hull City	H	D	2–2	Flitcroft (pen), Crosby	2,577
29 August	Southend United	A	W	1–0	Bennett	4,241
1 September	Cambridge United	H	L	0–3		2,199
5 September	Exeter City	A	W	1–0	Richardson	2,551
8 September	Peterborough United	A	L	0–3		4,548
12 September	Torquay United	H	W	2–0	Richardson, Murphy	1,729
19 September	Carlisle United	A	D	1–1	Flitcroft	2,971
26 September	Cardiff City	H	D	2–2	Priest, Thomas	2,842
3 October	Scarborough	A	W	4–2	Priest, Thomas (2), Flitcroft	1,832
11 October	Barnet	A	D	0–0		2,236
17 October	Swansea City	H	D	1–1	Murphy	3,926
20 October	Hartlepool United	H	D	1–1	Woods	2,182
31 October	Shrewsbury Town	H	D	1–1	Murphy	3,699
7 November	Scunthorpe United	A	L	1–2	Murphy	3,160
10 November	Halifax Town	A	L	2–3	Beckett, Murphy	2,427
21 November	Rochdale	H	D	1–1	Wright	2,495
28 November	Brentford	A	L	1–2	Davidson	5,173
12 December	Darlington	H	W	1–0	Shelton	2,011
18 December	Rotherham United	A	W	4–2	Priest, Conroy (2), Murphy	2,696
26 December	Hull City	A	W	2–1	Flitcroft, Whitney (o.g.)	6,695
28 December	Mansfield Town	H	D	1–1	Reid	3,320
2 January	Southend United	H	D	1–1	Murphy	2,574
9 January	Leyton Orient	A	D	2–2	Murphy, Smith (pen)	4,132
15 January	Brighton & Hove Albion	H	D	1–1	Conroy	3,869
23 January	Cambridge United	A	L	1–2	Crosby (pen)	3,635
30 January	Mansfield Town	A	L	0–3		2,654
6 February	Exeter City	H	D	0–0		2,243
13 February	Peterborough United	H	W	1–0	Murphy	2,087
20 February	Torquay United	A	W	3–0	Beckett, Alsford, Cross	2,384
23 February	Plymouth Argyle	A	L	0–2		4,208
27 February	Carlisle United	H	W	2–1	Richardson, Murphy	2,450
5 March	Cardiff City	A	D	0–0		7,526
9 March	Scarborough	H	L	1–3	Beckett	1,954
13 March	Scunthorpe United	H	L	0–2		2,115
20 March	Shrewsbury Town	A	L	0–2		2,903
27 March	Plymouth Argyle	H	W	3–2	Beckett (2), Murphy	1,982
3 April	Swansea City	A	D	1–1	Beckett	5,994
5 April	Barnet	H	W	3–0	Murphy, Crosby (pen), Beckett	2,122
10 April	Hartlepool United	A	L	0–2		2,413
13 April	Brentford	H	L	1–3	Crosby (pen)	1,766
17 April	Rochdale	A	L	1–3	Beckett	1,712
24 April	Halifax Town	H	D	2–2	Priest, Beckett	2,461
1 May	Darlington	A	W	2–1	Flitcroft, Beckett	2,564
8 May	Rotherham United	H	D	1–1	Beckett	3,792

== FA Cup ==
Round	Date	Opponents	Venue	Result	Score	Scorers	Attendance
First round	11 November	Cardiff City (4)	A	L	0–6		4,220

== League Cup ==
Round	Date	Opponents	Venue	Result	Score	Scorers	Attendance
First round first leg	11 August	Port Vale (2)	A	W	2–1	Beckett (2)	3,478
First round second leg	18 August	Port Vale (2)	H	D	2–2	Smith, Snijders (o.g.)	2,461
Second round first leg	15 September	Sunderland (2)	A	L	0–3		20,618
Second round second leg	22 September	Sunderland (2)	H	L	0–1		2,738

== Football League Trophy ==
Round	Date	Opponents	Venue	Result	Score	Scorers	Attendance
First round	8 December	Hartlepool United (4)	H	L	1–2	Shelton	960

== Season statistics ==
Nat	Player	Total		League		FA Cup		League Cup		FL Trophy	
Nat	Player	A	G	A	G	A	G	A	G	A	G
Goalkeepers
(England)	Wayne Brown	26	–	23	–	–	–	3	–	–	–
(England)	Neil Cutler	26	–	23	–	1	–	1	–	1	–
Field players
(England)	Sam Aiston	12	–	11	–	–	–	–	–	1	–
(England)	Julian Alsford	9+1	1	9+1	1	–	–	–	–	–	–
(England)	Luke Beckett	25+4	13	24+4	11	–	–	1	2	–	–
(England)	Gary Bennett	6+3	1	5+2	1	–	–	1+1	–	–	–
(England)	Danny Carson	1+1	–	1+1	–	–	–	–	–	–	–
(Scotland)	Mike Conroy	11+4	3	11+4	3	–	–	–	–	–	–
(England)	Andy Crosby	46	4	41	4	1	–	3	–	1	–
(England)	Jonathan Cross	39+2	1	33+2	1	1	–	4	–	1	–
(England)	Ross Davidson	45	1	40	1	1	–	4	–	–	–
(England)	Neil Fisher	7+1	–	7+1	–	–	–	–	–	–	–
(England)	David Flitcroft	48	6	42	6	1	–	4	–	1	–
(Wales)	Jonathan Jones	2+8	–	2+6	–	0+1	–	0+1	–	–	–
(England)	Martyn Lancaster	8+5	–	8+3	–	0+1	–	–	–	0+1	–
(Wales)	Darren Moss	5+2	–	5+2	–	–	–	–	–	–	–
(England)	John Murphy	47+1	12	41+1	12	1	–	4	–	1	–
(England)	Chris Priest	39	4	35	4	1	–	3	–	–	–
(England)	Shaun Reid	20+6	1	16+6	1	1	–	2	–	1	–
(England)	Nick Richardson	46+2	3	41+2	3	1	–	3	–	1	–
(England)	Andy Shelton	7+17	2	5+17	1	–	–	1	–	1	1
(Netherlands)	Jorg Smeets	1+2	–	1+2	–	–	–	–	–	–	–
(England)	Alex Smith	37	3	32	2	–	–	4	1	1	–
(England)	Rod Thomas	4+5	3	3+3	3	–	–	1+2	–	–	–
(England)	Matt Woods	47+2	1	41+2	1	1	–	4	–	1	–
(England)	Darren Wright	8+13	1	6+12	1	1	–	1+1	–	–	–
	Own goals	–	2	–	1	–	–	–	1	–	–
	Total	52	62	46	57	1	–	4	4	1	1
