= Paul Berry =

Paul Berry may refer to:

- Paul Berry (politician) (born 1976), Northern Ireland unionist politician
- Paul Berry (animator) (1961–2001), British stop-motion animator and director
- Paul Berry (cricketer) (born 1968), English cricketer
- Paul Berry (footballer, born 1958) (1958–2026), English footballer for Oxford United
- Paul Berry (footballer, born 1978), former English footballer for Chester City
- Paul Berry (television) (born 1944), Washington, D.C. journalist
- Paul Edward Berry (born 1952), American botanist and curator

== See also ==
- Paul Barry (disambiguation)
