= Andrew Shelton =

Andrew Shelton may refer to:

- Skeeter Shelton (Andrew Kemper Shelton, 1888–1954), baseball player
- Andy Shelton (Andrew Marc Shelton, born 1980), English footballer
- Drew Shelton (Andrew King Shelton, born 2003), American football offensive tackle

== See also ==
- Andrew Sheldon (disambiguation)
