= Lewis Cass (footballer) =

English footballer (born 2000)

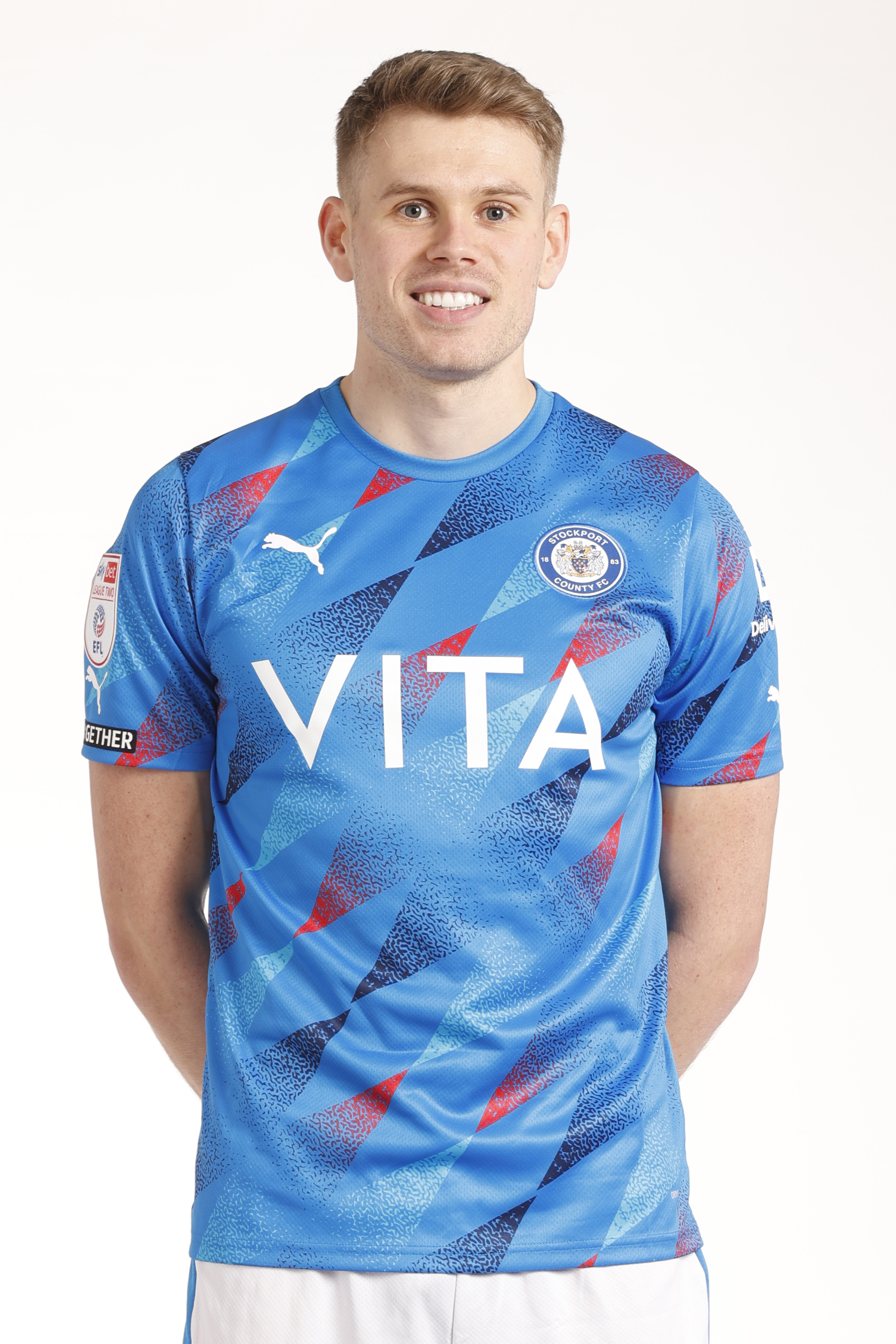
- Cass with Stockport County

Personal information
- Full name: Lewis Graham Cass
- Date of birth: 27 February 2000 (age 26)
- Place of birth: North Shields, England
- Height: 1.85 m (6 ft 1 in)
- Position: Defender

Team information
- Current team: Harrogate Town
- Number: 24

Youth career
- 20??–2012: North Shields Juniors
- 2012–2020: Newcastle United

Senior career*
Years	Team	Apps	(Gls)
2020–2022	Newcastle United	0	(0)
2020–2021	→ Hartlepool United (loan)	34	(0)
2021–2022	→ Port Vale (loan)	19	(0)
2022–2024	Port Vale	31	(0)
2024	→ Stockport County (loan)	9	(1)
2024–2025	Grimsby Town	26	(1)
2025–	Harrogate Town	25	(0)
- * Club domestic league appearances and goals as of 00:42, 3 May 2026 (UTC)

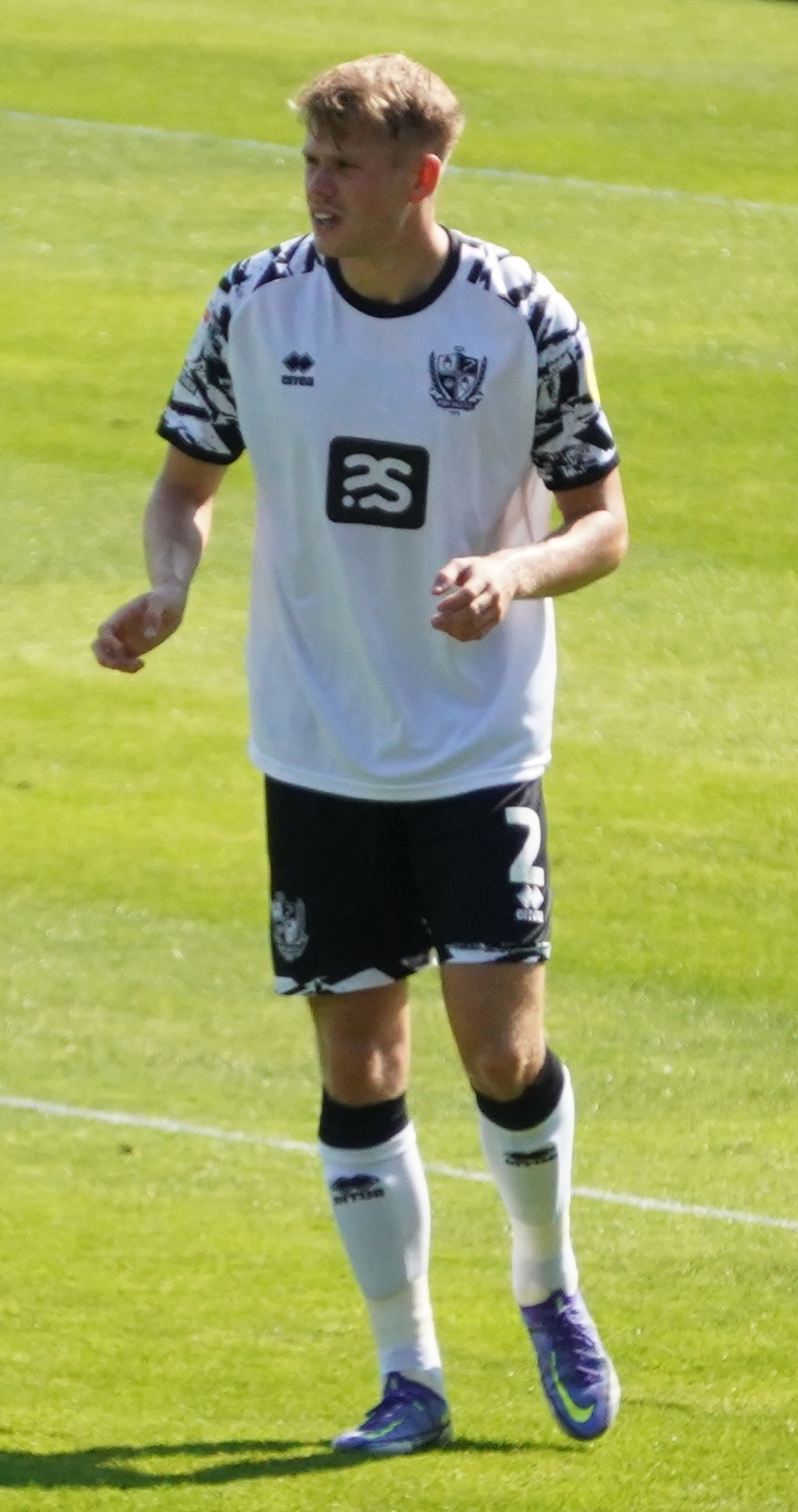
Cass as a Port Vale player

Lewis Graham Cass (born 27 February 2000) is an English professional footballer who plays as a defender for National League club Harrogate Town.

Cass was with Newcastle United from 2012 to 2022. He spent the 2020–21 season on loan at Hartlepool United, who won promotion out of the National League via the play-offs. He spent the first half of the 2021–22 season on loan at Port Vale before joining the club permanently in July 2022. He was loaned to Stockport County for the second half of the 2023–24 season. He joined Grimsby Town in July 2024 and moved on to Harrogate Town 11 months later.

== Career ==
=== Newcastle United ===
Cass joined the Academy at Newcastle United from North Shields Juniors at the age of 12. He was named on the "Magpies" Premier League bench for the first time on the final day of the 2018–19 season at Fulham, in what was Rafael Benítez's final game as manager. He was next named on the bench by new manager Steve Bruce in an FA Cup tie with Rochdale in January 2020.

On 1 October 2020, Cass joined National League club Hartlepool United on loan for the 2020–21 season. He made his first-team debut two days later as "Pools" recorded a 2–1 win over Aldershot Town. He played primarily on the right-hand side of a three-man defence at Hartlepool. He signed a new contract with Newcastle in January, keeping him tied to St James' Park until 2022. On 9 March, he was sent off 24 minutes into a 1–1 draw at Altrincham. He made a total of 37 appearances throughout the campaign, helping Hartlepool to qualify for the play-off quarter-finals in fourth-place. Hartlepool went on to secure promotion out of the play-offs, though Cass was not in the matchday squad for the final as he was recovering from a hamstring injury. Hartlepool manager Dave Challinor tried to bring back Cass to Victoria Park on loan for the following season but was unable to do so due to competition from other clubs.

=== Port Vale ===
On 12 July 2021, Newcastle United loan manager Shola Ameobi sanctioned a season-long loan move to League Two side Port Vale. He was signed by manager Darrell Clarke to compete with James Gibbons at right-back and to provide cover at centre-back. He made his debut for the "Valiants" on 10 August, coming on as a 65th-minute substitute for Dan Jones in a 2–1 defeat to Newcastle's Tyne–Wear derby rivals Sunderland in an EFL Cup first round fixture at Vale Park. He scored his first goal in professional football in a 5–1 victory over Accrington Stanley in an FA Cup first round match on 6 November. He impressed in his 27 appearances for the "Valiants", playing on the right of the back three or at wing-back, and received interest from other lower league clubs in the January transfer window before his season was cut short after he tore his ankle ligaments in training on 27 January. During his recovery time he provided scouting reports for Port Vale acting manager Andy Crosby in the North East. Port Vale went on to win promotion out of the play-offs in May, and Cass said that "I hate watching this on TV, I would rather be a part of it".

On 11 June 2022, Port Vale announced that Cass would join the club on a contract of undisclosed length from 1 July; David Flitcroft, the club's director of football, stated that "I spoke to Darrell [Clarke], Andy [Crosby] and Dean [Whitehead] and the way they all spoke about him you could see they admired him... it was a collective decision". He started four of the opening five league games of the 2022–23 season, before dropping out of the team to accommodate Will Forrester. He missed February and March after being sidelined with a calf strain.

On 4 November 2023, he put in a man of the match performance in a 0–0 draw at home to Burton Albion after centre-back partner Nathan Smith was sent off, and after the game commented that he felt his physicality had greatly improved over the previous 12 months as he adapted to League One football. However, seven days later he made a mistake to give away the equalising goal in a 1–1 draw at Lincoln City, only to come off the bench to score his second career goal in the replay at Burton Albion four days on from the Lincoln game.

On 1 February 2024, Cass signed for League Two club Stockport County until the end of the 2023–24 season, reuniting with his former boss at Hartlepool, Dave Challinor. He scored his first ever league goal on his debut for the club nine days later, in a 3–1 win at Grimsby Town. On 9 March, he won nine aerial duels and also made four clearances and two interceptions as Stockport beat Newport County 1–0; his performance earned himself a place in the EFL Team of the Week. Stockport were promoted as champions and he returned to Port Vale, who had been relegated out of League One. He returned to Port Vale, where he was released.

=== Grimsby Town ===
On 9 July 2024, Cass signed a two-year contract with League Two club Grimsby Town. Head coach David Artell said he "had a longstanding interest in Lewis" and had tried to sign him in the January transfer window. He made his competitive debut for the club in a 1–0 away defeat to Fleetwood Town on the opening day of the season. Cass scored his first goal for the club as a substitute in a 3–2 victory over Carlisle United on 28 September. He played 31 games in the 2024–25 campaign, including 18 league starts.

=== Harrogate Town ===
On 2 June 2025, Cass joined League Two club Harrogate Town on a permanent transfer after his contract with Grimsby was ended by mutual consent. Having secured Cass to a two-year deal, Head of Recruitment Lloyd Kerry said that he and manager Simon Weaver had tried to sign him previously and had been monitoring him ever since. Cass struggled with injuries throughout the 2025–26 season, which culminated in relegation for the club.

== Style of play ==
Cass is a defender who can play as a right-back or centre-back.

== Career statistics ==
As of match played 2 May 2026

Appearances and goals by club, season and competition
Club	Season	League			FA Cup		EFL Cup		Other		Total	
Club	Season	Division	Apps	Goals	Apps	Goals	Apps	Goals	Apps	Goals	Apps	Goals
Newcastle United	2018–19	Premier League	0	0	0	0	0	0	—		0	0
Newcastle United	2019–20	Premier League	0	0	0	0	0	0	—		0	0
Newcastle United	2020–21	Premier League	0	0	0	0	0	0	—		0	0
Newcastle United	2021–22	Premier League	0	0	0	0	0	0	—		0	0
Newcastle United	Total		0	0	0	0	0	0	0	0	0	0
Newcastle United U21	2018–19	—	—		—		—		2 (Note: Appearances in EFL Trophy)	0	2	0
Newcastle United U21	2019–20	—	—		—		—		3	0	3	0
Newcastle United U21	2020–21	—	—		—		—		2	0	2	0
Newcastle United U21	Total		0	0	0	0	0	0	7	0	7	0
Hartlepool United (loan)	2020–21	National League	34	0	2	0	—		1 (Note: Appearance in FA Trophy)	0	37	0
Port Vale (loan)	2021–22	League Two	19	0	3	1	1	0	4	0	27	1
Port Vale	2022–23	League One	19	0	1	0	0	0	4	0	24	0
Port Vale	2023–24	League One	12	0	2	1	4	0	2	0	20	1
Port Vale	Total		50	0	6	2	5	0	10	0	71	2
Stockport County (loan)	2023–24	League Two	9	1	—		—		—		9	1
Grimsby Town	2024–25	League Two	26	1	1	0	1	0	3	1	31	2
Harrogate Town	2025–26	League Two	25	0	0	0	1	0	2	0	28	0
Harrogate Town	2026–27	National League	0	0	0	0	—		0	0	0	0
Harrogate Town	Total		25	0	0	0	1	0	2	0	28	0
Career total			144	2	9	2	7	0	23	1	183	5
