= Paul Barry (disambiguation) =

Paul Barry (born 1952) is a British-born, Australian-based journalist.

Paul Barry may also refer to:

- Paul Barry (American football) (1926–2014), American running back
- Paul Barry (songwriter) (active from 1998), British songwriter and musician
- Paul W. Barry (active 1948–1957), American polo player

== See also ==
- Barry Paul (born 1948), British Olympic fencer
- Paul de Barry, French Jesuit and writer
- Paul Barry-Walsh (born 1955), British businessman
- Paul Berry (disambiguation)
