= Evan Khouri =

English footballer

Personal information
- Full name: Evan Marley Khouri
- Date of birth: 21 January 2003 (age 23)
- Place of birth: Havering, England
- Height: 1.79 m (5 ft 10 in)
- Position: Midfielder

Youth career
- 2007–2019: West Ham United
- 2019–2020: Grimsby Town

Senior career*
Years	Team	Apps	(Gls)
2020–2026	Grimsby Town	102	(7)
2024	→ Spennymoor Town (loan)	3	(0)
- * Club domestic league appearances and goals as of 11:27, 6 May 2026 (UTC)

Evan Marley Khouri (born 21 January 2003) is an English footballer who most recently played as a midfielder for EFL League Two club Grimsby Town but is currently without a club after the expiry of his contract.

== Career ==
Having previously been part of the academy at West Ham United, Khouri joined Grimsby Town on a two-year scholarship during the summer of 2019. Ian Holloway gave him his senior debut at the age of 17 on 5 September 2020, replacing Danny Rose during the second half of a 1–1 EFL Cup draw against Morecambe, which Grimsby lost 4–3 in a penalty shoot-out. Khouri made his league debut on 17 April 2021, starting a 2–1 victory over Bolton Wanderers. He signed his first professional contract with Grimsby later that month.

Khouri made two league appearances during the 2021–22 season as Grimsby secured promotion through the National League play-offs, although he was not included in the matchday squad for the final against Solihull Moors at the London Stadium. On 22 June 2022, he signed a new two-year contract ahead of the club's return to EFL League Two.

Khouri made 22 appearances in all competitions during the 2022–23 season. He appeared as a substitute in Grimsby's 2–1 victory away to Premier League club Southampton, which took the club into the FA Cup quarter-finals for the first time since 1939. At the conclusion of the season, he was voted Grimsby's Supporters' Young Player of the Season.

On 12 October 2023, Khouri signed a two-year contract extension, keeping him at Grimsby until the end of the 2025–26 season. His appearances during the first half of the 2023–24 season were limited by an ankle injury. On 31 January 2024, he joined National League North club Spennymoor Town on a one-month loan. Khouri started three matches during the loan, against Peterborough Sports, Southport and Chorley, before illness made him unavailable and he returned to Grimsby at the end of February.

Khouri established himself as a regular member of Grimsby's midfield during the 2024–25 season, appearing in all 46 league matches. On 26 December 2024, he scored his first professional goal, heading the opening goal in a 2–1 victory over Harrogate Town. He finished the league campaign with three goals and was named Grimsby's Young Player of the Year for a second time.

On 27 August 2025, Khouri played in Grimsby's EFL Cup tie against Manchester United. The match finished 2–2 before Grimsby won 12–11 in a prolonged penalty shoot-out, with Khouri converting one of the club's penalties. During the 2025–26 season, he made 32 league appearances and scored four goals. He suffered a knee injury against Salford City in March 2026 and was referred to a specialist to determine whether surgery was required.

Grimsby offered Khouri a new contract following the season, but on 3 June 2026 the club announced that he had decided to leave when his existing agreement expired. He departed after a seven-year association with Grimsby, having made more than 100 first-team appearances.

In August 2026, Khouri joined Championship club Lincoln City on trial. He started in midfield as one of six trialists in a 1–0 pre-season victory away to Doncaster Rovers on 1 August. The trial did not result in Khouri being offered a contract.

== Style of play ==
Khouri plays primarily as a central midfielder, but can also play as a wide midfielder or as an attacking midfielder. He is left-footed.

== Career statistics ==
As of match played 2 May 2026

Appearances and goals by club, season and competition
Club	Season	League			FA Cup		League Cup		Other		Total	
Club	Season	Division	Apps	Goals	Apps	Goals	Apps	Goals	Apps	Goals	Apps	Goals
Grimsby Town	2020–21	League Two	6	0	0	0	1	0	1 (Note: Appearance(s) in EFL Trophy)	0	8	0
Grimsby Town	2021–22	National League	2	0	0	0	–		0	0	2	0
Grimsby Town	2022–23	League Two	11	0	5	0	4	0	2	0	22	0
Grimsby Town	2023–24	League Two	5	0	0	0	1	0	2	0	8	0
Grimsby Town	2024–25	League Two	46	3	1	0	2	0	2	0	51	3
Grimsby Town	2025–26	League Two	32	4	4	0	4	0	2	0	42	4
Grimsby Town	Total		102	7	10	0	12	0	9	0	133	7
Spennymoor Town (loan)	2023–24	National League North	3	0	0	0	–		0	0	3	0
Career total			105	7	10	0	12	0	9	0	136	7

== Honours ==
Grimsby Town

- National League play-off winners: 2022

Individual

- Grimsby Town Young Player of the Year: 2022–23
