= 2024–25 Grimsby Town F.C. season =

147th season in existence of Grimsby Town FC

Grimsby Town
2024–25 season
- Owner: 1878 Partners (63.1%), The Mariners Trust (13.5%), Other Shareholders (12.9%), Mike Parker (10%)
- Chairman: Andrew Pettit
- Manager: David Artell
- Stadium: Blundell Park
- League Two: 9th
- FA Cup: First round
- EFL Cup: Second round
- EFL Trophy: Group stage
- Top goalscorer: League: Danny Rose (14); All: Danny Rose (15)
- Highest home attendance: 8,369 vs AFC Wimbledon (3 May 2025, League Two)
- Lowest home attendance: 927 vs Manchester City U21 (29 October 2024, EFL Trophy)
- Average home league attendance: 6,067
- Biggest win: 5–2 vs Accrington Stanley (H) (3 December 2024, League Two)
- Biggest defeat: 5–1 vs Sheffield Wednesday (H) (27 August 2024, EFL Cup)
Home colours	Away colours	Third colours

The 2024–25 season was the 147th season in the history of Grimsby Town Football Club and their third consecutive season in League Two. In addition to the domestic league, the club would also participate in the FA Cup, the EFL Cup, and the EFL Trophy.

Ahead of this season, Umbro were announced as the new kit provider for the next three seasons, replacing previous supplier Macron. Umbro produced three new kits for the team as well as a range of retro-feel training wear.

This was the first season of a new 5-year broadcasting deal between the EFL and Sky Sports which guaranteed to show 20+ games live for each EFL team across the 2024-25 season including league matches, all EFL Cup games and all EFL Trophy games via a new channel called 'Sky Sports+'.

They finished the season in 9th place, narrowly missing out on the play-offs on the final day of the season.

== Transfers ==
=== In ===
Date	Pos.	Player	From	Fee	Ref.
14 June 2024	GK	Jordan Wright (ENG)	Lincoln City (ENG)	Undisclosed	
20 June 2024	CB	Cameron McJannet (ENG)	Derry City (IRL)	Undisclosed	
1 July 2024 (Note: The transfer was announced on 20 June, and would become official on 1 July once his Reading contract expired)	LB	Matthew Carson (ENG)	Reading (ENG)	Free	
1 July 2024 (Note: The transfer was announced on 28 May, and would become official on 1 July once his Barrow contract expired)	RB	Tyrell Warren (ENG)	Barrow (ENG)	Free	
4 July 2024	CM	George McEachran (ENG)	Swindon Town (ENG)	Free	
9 July 2024	CB	Lewis Cass (ENG)	Port Vale (ENG)	Free	
9 July 2024	RW	Jason Daði Svanþórsson (ISL)	Breiðablik (ISL)	Undisclosed	
26 January 2025	RW	Darragh Burns (IRE)	MK Dons (ENG)	Undisclosed	
31 January 2025	CDM	Géza Dávid Turi (FRO)	Víkingur (FRO)	Undisclosed	

=== Out ===
Date	Pos.	Player	To	Fee	Ref.
14 June 2024 (Note: The transfer was announced on 11 June, and would become official on 14 June once the transfer window re-opened)	CM	Alex Hunt (ENG)	York City (ENG)	Undisclosed	
9 July 2024	CB	Toby Mullarkey (ENG)	Crawley Town (ENG)	Undisclosed	

=== Loaned in ===
Date	Position	Player	From	Date until	Ref
6 August 2024	LW	Luca Barrington (ENG)	Brighton & Hove Albion (ENG)	End of season	
8 August 2024	CM	Jordan Davies (WAL)	Wrexham (WAL)	End of Season	
30 August 2024	CM	Jayden Luker (ENG)	Luton Town (ENG)	End of Season	
30 August 2024	CF	Justin Obikwu (TTO)	Coventry City (ENG)	End of Season	
1 October 2024	GK	Jackson Smith (ENG)	Barnsley (ENG)	28 October 2024 (Note: On 8 October, Smith's emergency loan from Barnsley was extended by a further 7-days) (Note: On 16 October, Smith's emergency loan from Barnsley was extended by a further 7-days) (Note: On 22 October, Smith's emergency loan from Barnsley was extended by a further 7-days)	

=== Loaned out ===
Date	Pos.	Player	To	Date until	Ref.
14 September 2024	CM	Harvey Cribb (ENG)	Bridlington Town (ENG)	13 October 2024	
4 December 2024	CM	Charlie Clements (ENG)	Grimsby Borough (ENG)	4 January 2025	
3 January 2025	CM	Harvey Cribb (ENG)	Grimsby Borough (ENG)	31 January 2025	
23 January 2025	CF	Rekeil Pyke (ENG)	Eastleigh (ENG)	End of season	
4 February 2025	CF	Grayson Giles (ENG)	Cleethorpes Town (ENG)	End of season	
21 February 2025	LB	Matthew Carson (ENG)	Alfreton Town (ENG)	22 March 2025	
27 March 2025	LB	Matthew Carson (ENG)	Radcliffe (ENG)	End of season	

=== Released / Out of Contract ===
Date	Pos.	Player	Subsequent club	Join date	Ref.
30 June 2024	CM	Harry Clifton (WAL)	Doncaster Rovers (ENG)	1 July 2024	
30 June 2024	LB	Anthony Glennon (ENG)	Newport County (WAL)	1 July 2024	
30 June 2024	CB	Jamie Bramwell (ENG)	Gateshead (ENG)	2 July 2024	
30 June 2024	LW	Abo Eisa (SUD)	Nongbua Pitchaya (THA)	8 July 2024	
30 June 2024	CM	Gavan Holohan (IRL)	Crawley Town (ENG)	9 July 2024	
30 June 2024	CF	Edwin Essel (ENG)	Gainsborough Trinity (ENG)	21 July 2024	
30 June 2024	CB	Niall Maher (ENG)	Eastleigh (ENG)	8 August 2024	
30 June 2024	CM	Aaron Braithwaite (ENG)	Gainsborough Trinity (ENG)	10 August 2024	
30 June 2024	LW	Otis Khan (PAK)	Oldham Athletic (ENG)	30 August 2024	
30 June 2024	LB	Danny Amos (NIR)	Glentoran (NIR)	30 August 2024	
30 June 2024	AM	Harvey Tomlinson (ENG)	Boston United (ENG)	19 September 2024	
30 June 2024	LW	Arthur Gnahoua (FRA)	Southport (ENG)	8 February 2025	

== First-team Squad ==
As of 27 March 2025

No.	Name	Position	Nationality	Place of birth	Date of birth (age)	Signed from	Date signed	Fee	Contract end
Goalkeepers
1	Jordan Wright	GK	(England)	Stoke-on-Trent	27 February 1999 (age 27)	Lincoln City	14 June 2024	Undisclosed	30 June 2026
12	Jake Eastwood	GK	(England)	Rotherham	3 October 1996 (age 30)	Sheffield United	4 July 2023	Undisclosed	30 June 2025
41	Seb Auton	GK	(England)	Kingston upon Hull	17 November 2006 (age 19)	Academy		Trainee	30 June 2025
Defenders
2	Lewis Cass	CB	(England)	North Shields	27 February 2000 (age 26)	Port Vale	9 July 2024	Free	30 June 2026
5	Harvey Rodgers	CB	(England)	Selby	20 October 1996 (age 30)	Accrington Stanley	1 July 2023	Free	30 June 2026
17	Cameron McJannet	CB	(England)	Milton Keynes	6 September 1998 (age 28)	Derry City	20 June 2024	Undisclosed	30 June 2026
21	Tyrell Warren	RB	(England)	Manchester	5 October 1998 (age 28)	Barrow	1 July 2024	Free	30 June 2026
24	Doug Tharme	CB	(England)	Birkenhead	17 August 1999 (age 27)	Blackpool	12 January 2024	Undisclosed	30 June 2025
33	Denver Hume	LB	(England)	Ashington	11 August 1998 (age 28)	Portsmouth	1 February 2024	Free	30 June 2025
Midfielders
4	Kieran Green	CM	(England)	Stockton-on-Tees	30 June 1997 (age 29)	FC Halifax Town	15 July 2022	Undisclosed	30 June 2027
6	Curtis Thompson	CM	(England)	Nottingham	2 September 1993 (age 33)	Cheltenham Town	1 February 2024	Free	30 June 2025
7	Jordan Davies	CM	(Wales)	Wrexham	18 August 1998 (age 25)	Wrexham	8 August 2024	Loan	30 June 2025
8	Jayden Luker	CM	(England)	Southwark	30 April 2005 (age 19)	Luton Town	30 August 2024	Loan	30 June 2025
10	Charles Vernam	LW	(England)	Lincoln	8 October 1996 (age 30)	Lincoln City	20 June 2023	Undisclosed	30 June 2026
11	Jason Daði Svanþórsson	RW	(Iceland)	Mosfellsbær	31 December 1999 (age 26)	Breiðablik	9 July 2024	Undisclosed	30 June 2026
14	Luca Barrington	LW	(England)	Manchester	12 December 2004 (age 21)	Brighton & Hove Albion	6 August 2024	Loan	30 June 2025
16	Callum Ainley	AM	(England)	Swindon	2 November 1997 (age 29)	Crewe Alexandra	9 September 2023	Free	30 June 2025
18	Darragh Burns	RW	(Republic of Ireland)	Stamullen	6 August 2002 (age 24)	MK Dons	26 January 2025	Undisclosed	30 June 2028
19	Géza Dávid Turi	CM	(Faroe Islands)	Hungary	6 October 2001 (age 25)	Víkingur	31 January 2025	Undisclosed	30 June 2027
20	George McEachran	CM	(England)	Oxford	30 August 2000 (age 26)	Swindon Town	4 July 2024	Free	30 June 2026
30	Evan Khouri	CM	(England)	London	21 January 2003 (age 23)	West Ham United	7 July 2019	Free	30 June 2026
44	Harvey Cribb	CM	(England)	England	21 January 2006 (age 20)	Scunthorpe United	30 April 2024	Trainee	30 June 2025
Forwards
9	Justin Obikwu	CF	(Trinidad and Tobago)	Brent	8 February 2004 (age 22)	Coventry City	30 August 2024	Loan	30 June 2025
22	Cameron Gardner	CF	(England)	Newcastle-Upon-Tyne	22 September 2005 (age 21)	Academy	22 September 2023	Trainee	30 June 2028
25	Donovan Wilson	CF	(England)	Yate	14 March 1997 (age 29)	Sutton United	1 July 2023	Free	30 June 2025
32	Danny Rose	CF	(England)	Barnsley	10 December 1993 (age 32)	Stevenage	14 June 2023	Undisclosed	30 June 2026
Out on Loan
3	Matty Carson	LB	(England)	Chester	17 October 2002 (age 24)	Reading	1 July 2024	Free	30 June 2026
15	Rekeil Pyke	CF	(England)	Leeds	1 September 1997 (age 29)	Shrewsbury Town	1 July 2023	Free	30 June 2025
Players departed midseason
31	Jackson Smith	GK	(England)	Telford	14 October 2001 (age 25)	Barnsley	1 October 2024	Emergency Loan	28 October 2024

== Pre-season and friendlies ==
On 4 June, Grimsby announced their first pre-season friendly, against neighbours Grimsby Borough. A day later, a further two fixtures were confirmed against Cleethorpes Town and York City. A fourth pre-season fixture was added in Alfreton Town. On 12 June, a fifth fixture during pre-season was announced, versus Boston United. A day later, it was confirmed that Rotherham United would visit during pre-season. A seventh friendly was later announced, against South Shields. Mansfield Town were then confirmed as an eighth pre-season opposition.

Win Draw Loss Fixtures

9 July 2024 Friendly	Grimsby Borough	0–2	Grimsby Town	Grimsby
19:45 BST		Report	Brown 42'; Carson 82'	Stadium: The Bradley Football Development Centre

13 July 2024 Friendly	Cleethorpes Town	0–2	Grimsby Town	Grimsby
14:00 BST		Report	Khouri 10'; Ladapo 81'	Stadium: Linden Club

16 July 2024 Friendly	Boston United	0–2	Grimsby Town	Boston
19:30 BST			Green 50'; Ladapo 68'	Stadium: Boston Community Stadium; Attendance: 832

20 July 2024 Friendly	York City	2–1	Grimsby Town	Huntington
15:00 BST	Chadwick 2'; John-Lewis 75'	Report	Augiar (og) 28'	Stadium: York Community Stadium; Attendance: 2332

27 July 2024 Friendly	South Shields	4–3	Grimsby Town	Jarrow
15:00 BST	Trialist 29'; Blackett 43'; Hodgson 45', 88'	Report	Vernam 34'; Ainley 44'; Cass 78'	Stadium: Mariners Park

30 July 2024 Friendly	Grimsby Town	2–2	Rotherham United	Cleethorpes
19:30 BST	Rodgers 2'; Gardner 87'	Report	Clarke-Harris 12'; Clarke-Harris (p) 55'	Stadium: Blundell Park; Attendance: 2017; Referee: Adam Herczeg

31 July 2024 Friendly	Alfreton Town	Cancelled	Grimsby Town	Alfreton
19:30 BST				Stadium: North Street
Note: Fixture was cancelled due to unforeseen circumstances.

3 August 2024 Friendly	Grimsby Town	0–1	Mansfield Town	Cleethorpes
15:00 BST		Report	Keillor-Dunn 78'	Stadium: Blundell Park

== Competitions ==
=== League Two ===
==== League table ====
Pos	Team	Pld	W	D	L	GF	GA	GD	Pts	Promotion, qualification or relegation
7	Chesterfield	46	19	13	14	73	54	+19	70	Qualification for League Two play-offs
8	Salford City	46	18	15	13	64	54	+10	69	
9	Grimsby Town	46	20	8	18	61	67	−6	68	
10	Colchester United	46	16	19	11	52	47	+5	67	
11	Bromley	46	17	15	14	64	59	+5	66	

Source: EFL Official Website
Rules for classification: 1) Points; 2) Goal difference; 3) Number of goals scored; 4) Head-to-head results; 5) Wins; 6) Away goals; 7) Penalty points (sec 9.5); 8) 12-point sending off offences

==== Results summary ====
Overall								Home						Away					
Pld	W	D	L	GF	GA	GD	Pts	W	D	L	GF	GA	GD	W	D	L	GF	GA	GD
46	20	8	18	61	67	−6	68	10	3	10	30	35	−5	10	5	8	31	32	−1

Last updated: 3 May 2025.
Source: Soccerway

==== Results by round ====
Round	1	2	3	4	5	6	7	8	9	10	11	12	13	14	15	16	17	18	19	20	21	22	23	24	25	27	28	29	30	31	32	33	34	35	36	26^{1}	37	38	39	40	41	42	43	44	45	46
Ground	A	H	A	H	A	H	H	A	A	H	A	H	A	H	A	A	H	H	A	H	A	H	H	A	A	H	A	H	A	H	A	H	A	H	A	H	H	H	A	A	H	A	H	A	A	H
Result	L	W	L	W	L	L	W	W	W	L	W	L	W	L	W	D	L	W	W	L	L	W	W	L	L	D	L	D	W	W	W	W	D	D	W	L	L	W	W	L	W	D	L	D	D	L
Position	18	13	16	11	16	21	13	11	8	11	8	10	7	10	7	7	8	7	5	7	8	8	6	8	9	9	9	10	9	9	9	8	8	8	8	8	9	7	7	7	7	7	8	7	8	9
Points	0	3	3	6	6	6	9	12	15	15	18	18	21	21	24	25	25	28	31	31	31	34	37	37	37	38	38	39	42	45	48	51	52	53	56	56	56	59	62	62	65	66	66	67	68	68

Source: EFL
A = Away; H = Home; W = Win; D = Draw; L = Loss; P = Postponed
Notes:
- ^{1} Matchday 26 (vs. Notts County) was postponed due to a frozen pitch.

==== Matches ====
On 26 June, the League Two fixtures were announced.

Win Draw Loss Fixtures

10 August 2024 1	Fleetwood Town	1–0	Grimsby Town	Fleetwood
15:00 BST	Helm 18'	Report	Rodgers (yellow card) 27'; Davies (yellow card) 69'; Khouri (yellow card) 90+3'	Stadium: Highbury Stadium; Attendance: 3,525; Referee: Ben Speedie

17 August 2024 2	Grimsby Town	3–2	Cheltenham Town	Cleethorpes
15:00 BST	Davies 44', 90+3'; Vernam 51'; Vernam (yellow card) 71'	Report	Young 61'; Taylor 82'; Bakare (yellow card) 36'; Payne (yellow card) 38'; Pett (yellow card) 43'; Taylor (yellow card) 57'; Bowman (yellow card) 77'; Bennett (yellow card) 90'	Stadium: Blundell Park; Attendance: 5885; Referee: Elliot Bell

22 August 2024 3	Notts County	4–1	Grimsby Town	Nottingham
20:00 BST	Jatta 6'; Crowley 15', 57'; Jones 45+1'; Bedeau (yellow card) 29'; Jatta (yellow card) 65'	Report	Rodgers 45+4'; Green (yellow card) 67'	Stadium: Meadow Lane; Attendance: 10,046; Referee: Oliver Yates
Note: Fixture was initially scheduled for 24 August, but was moved for live Sky Sports broadcast.

31 August 2024 4	Grimsby Town	2–1	Bradford City	Cleethorpes
15:00 BST	Rose 28'; Svanþórsson 47'; Rose (yellow card) 10'; Warren (yellow card) 45+4'; McJannet (yellow card) 62'; Rodgers (yellow card) 68'	Report	Sanderson 78'; Pattison (yellow card) 35'; Shepherd (yellow card) 52'; Wright (yellow card) 72'; Walker (yellow card) 90+1'	Stadium: Blundell Park; Attendance: 7,004; Referee: Stephen Martin

7 September 2024 5	Chesterfield	2–1	Grimsby Town	Chesterfield
15:00 BST	Berry 27'; Markanday 45+2'; Oldaker (yellow card) 24' (yellow-red card) 67'; Grimes (yellow card) 39'; Grigg (yellow card) 90+3'	Report	Vernam 50'; Warren (yellow card) 26'; Vernam (yellow card) 58'; Carson (yellow card) 90+1'	Stadium: SMH Group Stadium; Attendance: 9,325; Referee: Geoff Eltringham

14 September 2024 6	Grimsby Town	1–2	Barrow	Cleethorpes
15:00 BST	Green 45+3'; Green (yellow card) 77'; Ainley (yellow card) 86'; Wilson (yellow card) 90~+3'	Report	Foley 14'; Vassell 26'; Campbell (yellow card) 5'; Telford (yellow card) 68'; Feely (yellow card) 90-3'	Stadium: Blundell Park; Attendance: 5496; Referee: Ruebyn Ricardo

21 September 2024 7	Grimsby Town	1–0	Bromley	Cleethorpes
15:00 BST	Rose (pen.), 51'; Green (yellow card) 38' (yellow-red card) 85'; Svanþórsson (yellow card) 79'; McEachran (yellow card) 90'	Report	Odutayo (yellow card) 32'	Stadium: Blundell Park; Attendance: 6115; Referee: Tom Reeves

28 September 2024 8	Carlisle United	2–3	Grimsby Town	Carlisle
15:00 BST	Lavelle 12'; Sadi 27'; Vela (yellow card) 55'; Sadi (yellow card) 58'; Barclay (yellow card) 61'	Report	Barrington 24'; Cass 81'; Rodgers 90'	Stadium: Brunton Park; Attendance: 7510; Referee: Seb Stockbridge

1 October 2024 9	Gillingham	0–1	Grimsby Town	Gillingham
19:45 BST	Morris (yellow card) 50'	Report	Green 21'; McJannet (yellow card) 25'; Hume (yellow card) 51'; Pyke (yellow card) 66'; Green (yellow card) 81'; Khouri (yellow card) 88'; Rodgers (yellow card) 90+6'	Stadium: Priestfield Stadium; Referee: Carl Brook

5 October 2024 10	Grimsby Town	0–3	Doncaster Rovers	Cleethorpes
12:30 BST	Hume (yellow card) 24'; Green (yellow card) 36'; Rodgers (red card) 45'	Report	Gibson 2', 44'; Molyneux 10'	Stadium: Blundell Park; Attendance: 7,693; Referee: Edward Duckworth
Note: Fixture was initially scheduled for a 15:00 kick-off, but was moved for live Sky Sports broadcast.

12 October 2024 11	Salford City	1–2	Grimsby Town	Kersal
15:00 BST	Mnoga (yellow card) 8'; Stockton 15'; McAleny (yellow card) 30'; Austerfield (yellow card) 73'	Report	Barrington 1', 45+1'; Cass (yellow card) 39'; McJannet (yellow card) 81'; Khouri (yellow card) 88'; Carson (yellow card) 90+5'	Stadium: Moor Lane; Attendance: 3,608; Referee: Jacob Miles

19 October 2024 12	Grimsby Town	1–4	Walsall	Cleethorpes
15:00 BST	Wilson 87'; McEachran (yellow card) 35'; Carson (yellow card) 90+3'	Report	Matt 56'; Jellis 69'; Lowe 74'; Johnson 90+1'	Stadium: Blundell Park; Attendance: 5,984; Referee: Scott Jackson

22 October 2024 13	Tranmere Rovers	0–1	Grimsby Town	Birkenhead
19:45 BST	McGee (yellow card) 24'; O'Connor (yellow card) 73'; Turnbull (yellow card) 80'; Norris (yellow card) 82'; Davies (yellow card) 90+3'; Hendry (yellow card) 90+5'	Report	Obikwu 59'; Smith (yellow card) 69'; Warren (yellow card) 76'	Stadium: Prenton Park; Attendance: 5,428; Referee: Ben Toner

26 October 2024 14	Grimsby Town	1–3	Milton Keynes Dons	Cleethorpes
15:00 BST	Rose 16'; Warren (yellow card) 88'; Hume (yellow card) 90+2'	Report	Gilbey 49'; Hogan 53'; Lemonheigh-Evans 90+5'; Gilbey (yellow card) 64'; Lemonheigh-Evans (yellow card) 90+1'; Harrison (yellow card) 90+4'	Stadium: Blundell Park; Attendance: 5,853; Referee: Scott Oldham

9 November 2024 15	AFC Wimbledon	0–1	Grimsby Town	Wimbledon
15:00 GMT	Johnson (yellow card) 50'; Smith (yellow card) 77'	Report	Rose 30'; McEachran (yellow card) 42'; Hume (yellow card) 45+1'; Wright (yellow card) 54'	Stadium: Plough Lane; Attendance: 8,307; Referee: Thomas Parsons

16 November 2024 16	Newport County	0–0	Grimsby Town	Newport
15:00 GMT	Hudlin (penalty missed) 59'; Wildig (yellow card) 63'; Baker (yellow card) 71'; Whitmore (yellow card) 78'	Report	McJannet (yellow card) 58'; Green (yellow card) 65'; Thompson (yellow card) 78'; Rodgers (yellow card) 90+1'	Stadium: Rodney Parade; Attendance: 4,298; Referee: James Oldham

23 November 2024 17	Grimsby Town	0–1	Colchester United	Cleethorpes
12:30 GMT		Report	Edwards (yellow card) 1'; Egbo (yellow card) 28'; Gordon 78'; Macey (yellow card) 90+2'	Stadium: Blundell Park; Attendance: 4,952; Referee: Martin Woods
Note: Fixture was initially scheduled for a 15:00 kick-off, but was moved for live Sky Sports broadcast.

3 December 2024 18	Grimsby Town	5–2	Accrington Stanley	Cleethorpes
19:45 GMT	Rodgers 2'; Luker 11'; Obikwu 19'; Davies (p) 33'; Aljofree (og) 68'	Report	Khumbeni (yellow card) 31'; Love (yellow card) 40'; Henderson 63'; Woods 79'; Hunter (yellow card) 89'; O'Brien (yellow card) 90+3'	Stadium: Blundell Park; Attendance: 3,874; Referee: Scott Simpson

7 December 2024 19	Morecambe	0–3	Grimsby Town	Morecambe
15:00 GMT	Lewis (yellow card) 13'; Williams (yellow card) 32'; White (yellow card) 45+1'; Brown (yellow card) 88'	Report	Obikwu 26', 39'; Thompson (yellow card) 28'; Rodgers (yellow card) 65'; Rose (yellow card) 80'; Rose 90+1'	Stadium: Mazuma Mobile Stadium; Attendance: 2,995; Referee: Alan Young

14 December 2024 20	Grimsby Town	0–2	Crewe Alexandra	Cleethorpes
15:00 GMT	Thompson (yellow card) 47'	Report	Lankester 56'; Demetriou (yellow card) 62'; Tabiner 63'; Conolly (yellow card) 71'; Williams (yellow card) 73'	Stadium: Blundell Park; Attendance: 5,745; Referee: James Durkin

21 December 2024 21	Swindon Town	3–1	Grimsby Town	Swindon
15:00 GMT	Clarke 3', (yellow card) 66'; Cox (yellow card) 39'; Tshimanga 41', 61'; Wright (penalty missed) 52'	Report	Rose 72' (pen.); Hume (yellow card) 88'	Stadium: County Ground; Attendance: 7,453; Referee: Matthew Russell

26 December 2024 22	Grimsby Town	2–1	Harrogate Town	Cleethorpes
15:00 GMT	Khouri 55'; Svanthórsson 74', (yellow card) 90+3'; McEachran (yellow card) 90+2'	Report	Duke-McKenna 82'; Bray (yellow card) 90+1'; Sutton (yellow card) 90+6'	Stadium: Blundell Park; Attendance: 6,514; Referee: Darren Drysdale

29 December 2024 23	Grimsby Town	3–0	Port Vale	Cleethorpes
15:00 GMT	McJannet 29'; Davies (yellow card) 71'; Tharme 82'; Svanthórsson 90+2'	Report	Debrah (yellow card) 15'	Stadium: Blundell Park; Attendance: 7,045; Referee: Scott Jackson

1 January 2025 24	Accrington Stanley	3–2	Grimsby Town	Accrington
15:00 GMT	Woods 9'; Love (yellow card) 35'; Coyle (yellow card) 44'; Whalley 60' (p); Woods 82'; Henderson (yellow card) 90'	Report	Green 5'; Khouri 39', (yellow card) 74'	Stadium: Crown Ground; Attendance: 2,675; Referee: Edward Duckworth

4 January 2025 25	Bradford City	3–1	Grimsby Town	Bradford
13:00 GMT	Baldwin (yellow card) 39'; Richards 45+1'; Smallwood 48' (pen.), (yellow card) 59'; Pattison 69'; Lapslie (yellow card) 90+1'; Sarcevic (yellow card) 90+4'	Report	McJannet 51'; Khouri (yellow card) 53'; Warren (yellow card) 55'	Stadium: Valley Parade; Attendance: 18,011; Referee: Elliot Bell
Note: Fixture was initially scheduled for a 15:00 kick-off, but was moved following conversations with the EFL.

18 January 2025 27	Grimsby Town	1–1	Chesterfield	Cleethorpes
15:00 GMT	Davies 17'; Svanþórsson (yellow card) 57'; Hume (yellow card) 86'	Report	Naylor 34'; Naylor (yellow card) 70'; Fleck (yellow card) 90+2'	Stadium: Blundell Park; Attendance: 6,706; Referee: Jeremy Simpson

25 January 2025 28	Barrow	3–0	Grimsby Town	Barrow-in-Furness
15:00 GMT	Gotts 40'; Pressley (penalty missed) 53'; Smith 56'; Farman (yellow card) 82'; Vassell 85'	Report	Green (yellow card) 53'	Stadium: Holker Street; Attendance: 3,661; Referee: Oliver Mackey

28 January 2025 29	Grimsby Town	1–1	Gillingham	Cleethorpes
19:45 GMT	Rose 90+7'	Report	Tharme (og) 35'; Khumbeni (yellow card) 56'; Little (yellow card) 69'	Stadium: Blundell Park; Attendance: 4,239; Referee: Simon Mather

1 February 2025 30	Bromley	0–2	Grimsby Town	Bromley
15:00 GMT	Thompson (yellow card) 6'	Report	Thompson (yellow card) 5'; Rose (yellow card) 31', (goal) 46'; Obikwu 70'; Svanþórsson (yellow card) 78'; Hume (yellow card) 86'; Cass (yellow card) 90+5' (yellow-red card) 90+6'	Stadium: Hayes Lane; Attendance: 3,857; Referee: Sam Mulhall

8 February 2025 31	Grimsby Town	2–1	Carlisle United	Cleethorpes
15:00 GMT	Obikwu 62'; Khouri (yellow card) 71'; Rose (pen.), 83'	Report	Lavelle 5', (yellow card) 51'; Hugill (yellow card) 44'; Embleton (yellow card) 75'; Robson (yellow card) 82'; Thomas (yellow card) 90+4'	Stadium: Blundell Park; Attendance: 5,788; Referee: Zac Kennard-Kettle

15 February 2025 32	Doncaster Rovers	1–2	Grimsby Town	Doncaster
12:30 GMT	Molyneux (yellow card) 82'; Street 85'	Report	Obikwu 38'; Olowu 47' (o.g.); Rose (yellow card) 51'	Stadium: Eco-Power Stadium; Attendance: 9,961; Referee: Martin Coy
Note: Fixture was initially scheduled for a 15:00 kick-off, but was moved for live Sky Sports broadcast.

22 February 2025 33	Grimsby Town	2–1	Fleetwood Town	Cleethorpes
15:00 GMT	Mceachran 23'; Rose 64'; Wilson (yellow card) 90+7'	Report	Bennett (yellow card) 40'; Mayor (yellow card) 45+2'; Graydon (yellow card) 60', (goal) 61'; Wiredu (yellow card) 63'; Rooney (yellow card) 67'; Bolton (yellow card) 90+3'	Stadium: Blundell Park; Attendance: 5,996; Referee: Scott Tallis

1 March 2025 34	Cheltenham Town	1−1	Grimsby Town	Cheltenham
15:00 GMT	Miller (penalty missed) 24'; Williams 26'; Jude-Boyd (yellow card) 85'	Report	Green (yellow card) 14'; Hume (yellow card) 22'; Rodgers 53'; Svanþórsson (yellow card) 86'	Stadium: Whaddon Road; Attendance: 4,473; Referee: Robert Massey-Ellis

4 March 2025 35	Grimsby Town	1–1	Tranmere Rovers	Cleethorpes
19:45 GMT	McEachran (yellow card) 27'; Rose (pen.), 68'	Report	Finley 10'; Norman (yellow card) 76'	Stadium: Blundell Park; Attendance: 4,854; Referee: Greg Rollason

8 March 2025 36	Walsall	1−3	Grimsby Town	Bescot
12:30 GMT	Harrison 6'; Stirk (yellow card) 29'; McEntee (yellow card) 62'; Barrett (yellow card) 85'	Report	Luker 21', 66', (yellow card) 66'; Rose (pen.), 44'; Warren (yellow card) 45+2'; Svanþórsson (yellow card) 75'	Stadium: Bescot Stadium; Attendance: 6,255; Referee: Scott Jackson
Note: Kick off was originally 15:00 but was moved for Sky Sports broadcast.

11 March 2025 26	Grimsby Town	0−2	Notts County	Cleethorpes
19:45 GMT	Burns (yellow card) 71'	Report	Jatta 56'; McGoldrick 88'	Stadium: Blundell Park; Attendance: 6,270; Referee: Scott Oldham
Note: Fixture was initially scheduled for a 15:00 kick-off, but was moved for live Sky Sports broadcasting. The match was then postponed on that date due to a frozen pitch.

15 March 2025 37	Grimsby Town	0−1	Salford City	Cleethorpes
15:00 GMT		Report	Mnoga (yellow card) 12'; Warrington (yellow card) 13'; Adelakun (yellow card) 69'; Lund (yellow card) 76', (goal) 82'	Stadium: Blundell Park; Attendance: 6,398; Referee: Leigh Doughty

22 March 2025 38	Grimsby Town	1−0	Newport County	Cleethorpes
15:00 GMT	Rose (yellow card) 43'; Khouri (yellow card) 55'; McEachran 64'	Report	Evans (yellow card) 5'; Whitmore (yellow card) 61'; Baker (yellow card) 62'	Stadium: Blundell Park; Attendance: 5,339; Referee: Alan Young

28 March 2025 39	Colchester United	1−2	Grimsby Town	Colchester
19:45 GMT	Edwards 51', (yellow card) 84'; Hunt (yellow card) 82'	Report	Green (yellow card) 28', (goal) 46'; Khouri 76', (yellow card) 79'	Stadium: Colchester Community Stadium; Attendance: 6,986; Referee: Charles Breakspear
Note: Fixture was initially scheduled for 29 March, but was moved on agreement from both clubs to allow an extra day's recovery between games.

1 April 2025 40	Crewe Alexandra	2−0	Grimsby Town	Crewe
19:45 GMT	Long 14'; Demetriou (yellow card) 31', (goal) 90+3'; Cooney (yellow card) 58'; Lankester (yellow card) 87'	Report	Luker (yellow card) 38'; McEachran (yellow card) 57'; Rodgers (yellow card) 72'	Stadium: Gresty Road; Referee: Paul Marsden

5 April 2025 41	Grimsby Town	3−1	Morecambe	Cleethorpes
15:00 GMT	Green 24', 81'; Turi (yellow card) 39'; Hume (yellow card) 45+1'; Barrington 49'; Tharme (yellow card) 77'	Report	Lewis (yellow card) 13'; Dallas 30', (yellow card) 40'; Tutonda (yellow card) 67'; Jones (yellow card) 86'	Stadium: Blundell Park; Attendance: 5,807; Referee: Jacob Miles

12 April 2025 42	Harrogate Town	2−2	Grimsby Town	Harrogate
15:00 GMT	March (yellow card) 23'; Taylor 85'; Rose (og) 88'	Report	Green 39'; Svanþórsson 45+4'	Stadium: Wetherby Road; Attendance: 3,881; Referee: Aaron Bannister

18 April 2025 43	Grimsby Town	0−4	Swindon Town	Cleethorpes
15:00 GMT	Turi (yellow card) 59'	Report	Nichols 8'; Clarke 32', (yellow card) 76'; Tshimanga 65'; Freckleton (yellow card) 81'; Ameen 90+5'	Stadium: Blundell Park; Attendance: 7,624; Referee: Seb Stockbridge

21 April 2025 44	Port Vale	2−2	Grimsby Town	Burslem
15:00 GMT	Clark (yellow card) 26'; Tolaj 78'; Debrah 90+5'	Report	Rose 24', (pen.), 52'; Svanþórsson (yellow card) 40'; McEachran (yellow card) 62'; Rodgers (yellow card) 64'	Stadium: Vale Park; Attendance: 11,829; Referee: Richard Eley

26 April 2025 45	Milton Keynes Dons	0−0	Grimsby Town	Bletchley
15:00 GMT	Hendry (yellow card) 85'	Report		Stadium: Stadium MK; Attendance: 10,244; Referee: Adam Herczeg

3 May 2025 46	Grimsby Town	0−1	AFC Wimbledon	Cleethorpes
15:00 GMT		Report	Johnson (yellow card) 30'; Browne (yellow card) 42'; Hutchinson (yellow card) 50', (goal) 53'	Stadium: Blundell Park; Attendance: 8,369; Referee: Ross Joyce

=== FA Cup ===
Grimsby Town were drawn at home to Wealdstone in the first round.

Win Draw Loss Fixtures

2 November 2024 First round	Grimsby Town	0–1	Wealdstone	Cleethorpes
15:00 GMT	Obikwu (penalty missed) 11'; McEachran (yellow card) 22'	Report	Scott (yellow card) 16'; Kretzschmar (yellow card) 29'; Reid 90'	Stadium: Blundell Park; Attendance: 3,174; Referee: James Westgate

=== EFL Cup ===
On 27 June, the draw for the first round was made, with Grimsby being drawn at home against Bradford City. After beating Bradford on penalties, Grimsby were drawn at home against Sheffield Wednesday in Round 2.

Win Draw Loss Fixtures

13 August 2024 First round	Grimsby Town	1–1 (9–8 p)	Bradford City	Cleethorpes
19:45 BST	Wilson 36'; Green (yellow card) 75'	Report	Cook 76'; Baldwin (yellow card) 84'	Stadium: Blundell Park; Attendance: 3,082; Referee: David Coote
	Penalties
	Green (penalty missed); Davies (penalty scored); Vernam (penalty scored); Cass (penalty scored); Gardner (penalty scored); Ainley (penalty scored); Eastwood (penalty scored); McJannet (penalty scored); Khouri (penalty scored); McEachran (penalty scored)		(penalty scored) Smallwood; (penalty missed) Halliday; (penalty scored) Oduor; (penalty scored) Sarcevic; (penalty scored) Cook; (penalty scored) Young; (penalty scored) Baldwin; (penalty scored) Shepherd; (penalty scored) Pointon; (penalty missed) Byrne

27 August 2024 Second Round	Grimsby Town	1–5	Sheffield Wednesday	Cleethorpes
19:45 BST	McJannet 18'; Hume (yellow card) 38'; Carson (yellow card) 80'	Report	Ugbo 53'; Lowe 54'; Paterson 72', 81'; Valentín 90+3'; Ihiekwe (yellow card) 27'; Windass (yellow card) 68'	Stadium: Blundell Park; Attendance: 6,364; Referee: Matthew Corlett

=== EFL Trophy ===
In the group stage, Grimsby were drawn into Northern Group G alongside Chesterfield, Lincoln City and Manchester City U21.

The dates of each fixture were announced on 7 August 2024. The match against Manchester City U21 was rearranged due to Grimsby's progress to the second round of the EFL Cup, and the new date for this fixture was announced as Tuesday 29 October 2024.

Pos	Div	Team	Pld	W	PW	PL	L	GF	GA	GD	Pts	Qualification
1	L2	Chesterfield	3	2	1	0	0	5	3	+2	8	Advance to Round 2
2	L1	Lincoln City	3	2	0	0	1	7	2	+5	6	Advance to Round 2
3	ACA	Manchester City U21	3	0	1	1	1	2	7	−5	3	
4	L2	Grimsby Town	3	0	0	1	2	4	6	−2	1	

Source: EFL

Win Draw Loss Fixtures

8 October 2024 Group Stage	Grimsby Town	1–2	Lincoln City	Cleethorpes
19:30 BST	Ainley (yellow card) 21'; Svanþórsson 58'	Report	Earley (yellow card) 42'; Cadamarteri 66'; Erhahon (yellow card) 90+3'; Moylan 90+4'	Stadium: Blundell Park; Attendance: 1270; Referee: Oliver Mackey

29 October 2024 Group Stage	Grimsby Town	1–1 (4–5 p)	Manchester City U21	Cleethorpes
19:00 BST	Rose 90+1'; Carson (yellow card) 14'	Report	R. Heskey 89'; Oboavwoduo (yellow card) 45'; Mfuni (yellow card) 67'	Stadium: Blundell Park; Attendance: 927; Referee: Zac Kennard-Kettle
	Penalties
	Cass (penalty scored); Carson (penalty scored); Green (penalty scored); Hume (penalty missed); Rose (penalty scored); Gardner (penalty missed)		Mukasa (penalty scored); Gray (penalty missed); Dickson (penalty scored); R. Heskey (penalty scored); Whatmuff (penalty scored); J. Heskey (penalty scored)
Note: Fixture was originally scheduled for 27 August, but was postponed due to EFL Cup involvements.

12 November 2024 Group Stage	Chesterfield	3–2	Grimsby Town	Chesterfield
19:00 BST	Berry 8', 58'; Madden 39'; Naylor (yellow card) 70'	Report	Cass 18'; Gardner 47'; Cribb (yellow card) 90+6'	Stadium: SMH Group Stadium; Attendance: 1,538; Referee: Michael Barlow

== Statistics ==
=== Appearances and goals ===
As of match played 3 May 2025

Players with no appearances are not included on the list

No.	Pos	Nat	Player	Total		League Two		FA Cup		EFL Cup		EFL Trophy	
No.	Pos	Nat	Player	Apps	Goals	Apps	Goals	Apps	Goals	Apps	Goals	Apps	Goals
1	GK	(England) ENG	Jordan Wright	37	0	34+0	0	1+0	0	0+0	0	2+0	0
2	DF	(England) ENG	Lewis Cass	31	2	18+8	1	1+0	0	0+1	0	2+1	1
3	DF	(England) ENG	Matthew Carson	13	0	0+9	0	0+0	0	0+1	0	3+0	0
4	MF	(England) ENG	Kieran Green	43	7	36+3	7	1+0	0	2+0	0	0+1	0
5	DF	(England) ENG	Harvey Rodgers	49	4	44+0	4	1+0	0	2+0	0	1+1	0
6	MF	(England) ENG	Curtis Thompson	20	0	6+13	0	0+0	0	0+0	0	1+0	0
7	MF	(Wales) WAL	Jordan Davies	20	4	8+10	4	0+0	0	1+0	0	0+1	0
8	MF	(England) ENG	Jayden Luker	26	3	15+7	3	0+1	0	0+0	0	3+0	0
9	MF	(Trinidad and Tobago) TTO	Justin Obikwu	22	7	12+7	7	1+0	0	0+0	0	2+0	0
10	FW	(England) ENG	Charles Vernam	19	2	10+7	2	0+0	0	2+0	0	0+0	0
11	FW	(Iceland) ISL	Jason Daði Svanþórsson	47	5	36+7	4	1+0	0	1+0	0	1+1	1
12	GK	(England) ENG	Jake Eastwood	8	0	6+0	0	0+0	0	2+0	0	0+0	0
14	FW	(England) ENG	Luca Barrington	43	4	21+17	4	0+1	0	1+1	0	1+1	0
15	FW	(England) ENG	Rekeil Pyke	8	0	1+6	0	0+0	0	0+0	0	0+1	0
16	MF	(England) ENG	Callum Ainley	32	0	4+22	0	0+1	0	0+2	0	3+0	0
17	DF	(England) ENG	Cameron McJannet	45	3	38+3	2	1+0	0	2+0	1	1+0	0
18	MF	(Republic of Ireland) IRL	Darragh Burns	9	0	2+7	0	0+0	0	0+0	0	0+0	0
19	MF	(Faroe Islands) FRO	Géza Dávid Turi	4	0	2+2	0	0+0	0	0+0	0	0+0	0
20	MF	(England) ENG	George McEachran	49	2	40+4	2	1+0	0	2+0	0	0+2	0
21	DF	(England) ENG	Tyrell Warren	38	0	19+13	0	0+1	0	2+0	0	2+1	0
22	FW	(England) ENG	Cameron Gardner	17	1	3+8	0	0+1	0	0+2	0	3+0	1
23	MF	(England) ENG	Henry Brown	2	0	0+1	0	0+0	0	0+0	0	1+0	0
24	FW	(England) ENG	Doug Tharme	31	1	21+7	1	0+0	0	0+0	0	3+0	0
25	FW	(England) ENG	Donovan Wilson	15	2	4+8	1	0+0	0	1+1	1	1+0	0
26	DF	(England) ENG	Callum Storr	1	0	0+0	0	0+0	0	0+0	0	1+0	0
30	MF	(England) ENG	Evan Khouri	51	3	41+5	3	1+0	0	2+0	0	2+0	0
32	FW	(England) ENG	Danny Rose	48	15	35+10	14	1+0	0	1+0	0	0+1	1
33	DF	(England) ENG	Denver Hume	48	0	43+2	0	1+0	0	1+0	0	0+1	0
41	GK	(England) ENG	Seb Auton	1	0	0+1	0	0+0	0	0+0	0	0+0	0
44	MF	(England) ENG	Harvey Cribb	1	0	0+0	0	0+0	0	0+0	0	0+1	0
Players whose loans expired during the season:
31	GK	(England) ENG	Jackson Smith	7	0	6+0	0	0+0	0	0+0	0	1+0	0

=== Disciplinary record ===
As of match played 3 May 2025

Includes all competitive matches. The list is sorted by squad number when disciplinary points / points per card / number of cards are equal. Players with no cards not included in the list.

Rank	No.	Pos.	Nat.	Name	League Two			FA Cup			EFL Cup			EFL Trophy			Total		
Rank	No.	Pos.	Nat.	Name	Yellow card	Second yellow card	Red card	Yellow card	Second yellow card	Red card	Yellow card	Second yellow card	Red card	Yellow card	Second yellow card	Red card	Yellow card	Second yellow card	Red card
1	4	MF	(England)	Kieran Green	8	1	0	0	0	0	1	0	0	0	0	0	9	1	0
2	5	DF	(England)	Harvey Rodgers	7	1	0	0	0	0	0	0	0	0	0	0	7	1	0
3	33	DF	(England)	Denver Hume	9	0	0	0	0	0	1	0	0	0	0	0	10	0	0
4=	20	MF	(England)	George McEachran	7	0	0	1	0	0	0	0	0	0	0	0	8	0	0
4=	30	MF	(England)	Evan Khouri	8	0	0	0	0	0	0	0	0	0	0	0	8	0	0
6	11	MF	(Iceland)	Jason Daði Svanþórsson	7	0	0	0	0	0	0	0	0	0	0	0	7	0	0
7	21	DF	(England)	Tyrell Warren	6	0	0	0	0	0	0	0	0	0	0	0	6	0	0
8=	3	DF	(England)	Matthew Carson	3	0	0	0	0	0	1	0	0	1	0	0	5	0	0
8=	32	ST	(England)	Danny Rose	5	0	0	0	0	0	0	0	0	0	0	0	5	0	0
10	2	DF	(England)	Lewis Cass	1	1	0	0	0	0	0	0	0	0	0	0	1	1	0
11=	6	MF	(England)	Curtis Thompson	4	0	0	0	0	0	0	0	0	0	0	0	4	0	0
11=	17	DF	(England)	Cameron McJannet	4	0	0	0	0	0	0	0	0	0	0	0	4	0	0
13=	7	MF	(Wales)	Jordan Davies	2	0	0	0	0	0	0	0	0	0	0	0	2	0	0
13=	8	MF	(England)	Jayden Luker	2	0	0	0	0	0	0	0	0	0	0	0	2	0	0
13=	10	FW	(England)	Charles Vernam	2	0	0	0	0	0	0	0	0	0	0	0	2	0	0
13=	16	MF	(England)	Callum Ainley	1	0	0	0	0	0	0	0	0	1	0	0	2	0	0
13=	19	MF	(Faroe Islands)	Géza Dávid Turi	2	0	0	0	0	0	0	0	0	0	0	0	2	0	0
13=	25	ST	(England)	Donovan Wilson	2	0	0	0	0	0	0	0	0	0	0	0	2	0	0
19=	1	GK	(England)	Jordan Wright	1	0	0	0	0	0	0	0	0	0	0	0	1	0	0
19=	15	FW	(England)	Rekeil Pyke	1	0	0	0	0	0	0	0	0	0	0	0	1	0	0
19=	18	MF	(Republic of Ireland)	Darragh Burns	1	0	0	0	0	0	0	0	0	0	0	0	1	0	0
19=	24	DF	(England)	Doug Tharme	1	0	0	0	0	0	0	0	0	0	0	0	1	0	0
19=	31	GK	(England)	Jackson Smith	1	0	0	0	0	0	0	0	0	0	0	0	1	0	0
19=	44	MF	(England)	Harvey Cribb	0	0	0	0	0	0	0	0	0	1	0	0	1	0	0
Total					85	3	0	1	0	0	3	0	0	3	0	0	92	3	0
