= Matty Carson =

English footballer (born 2002)

Personal information
- Full name: Matthew Alan Carson
- Date of birth: 17 October 2002 (age 24)
- Place of birth: Chester, England
- Position: Left-back

Team information
- Current team: Solihull Moors
- Number: 15

Youth career
- 2008–2016: Liverpool
- 2016–2019: Burnley

Senior career*
Years	Team	Apps	(Gls)
2019–2021	Burnley	0	(0)
2019	→ Nelson (loan)		
2019	→ Padiham (loan)		
2021–2023	Accrington Stanley	0	(0)
2022	→ Carrick Rangers (loan)	14	(4)
2022	→ AFC Telford United (loan)	4	(1)
2022–2023	→ Stalybridge Celtic (loan)	8	(3)
2023–2024	Reading	17	(0)
2024–2025	Grimsby Town	13	(0)
2025	→ Alfreton Town (loan)	3	(0)
2025	→ Radcliffe (loan)	5	(0)
2025–2026	Boston United	34	(2)
2026–	Solihull Moors	13	(0)
- * Club domestic league appearances and goals as of 17:00, 31 October 2026 (UTC)

Matthew Alan Carson (born 17 October 2002) is an English professional footballer who plays as a left-back for National League club Solihull Moors.

== Career ==
=== Early career ===
Carson spent eight years in the Academy at Liverpool, before being released at the age of fourteen. He joined the Academy at Burnley following a four-week trial.

=== Accrington Stanley ===
On 5 July 2021, Carson completed a successful trial to sign a one-year contract with EFL League One club Accrington Stanley. On 6 August 2022, he joined National League North club AFC Telford United on a one-month loan. On 15 October 2022, he joined Northern Premier League Premier Division club Stalybridge Celtic on a one-month loan. He left Accrington on 31 January 2023.

=== Reading ===
Carson signed a short-term deal with EFL Championship club Reading on 15 February 2023 following a successful trial period. He signed a new contract in the summer. He made his first-team debut for the club on 8 August 2023, in a 4–0 win at Millwall in the EFL Cup. On 8 May 2024, Reading announced that Carson would be released in the summer once his contract expired.

=== Grimsby Town ===
On 19 June 2024, Carson signed a two-year contract with EFL League Two club Grimsby Town following his release by Reading. He made his competitive debut for the club on 27 August as a second-half substitute in a 5–1 EFL Cup defeat to Sheffield Wednesday.

On 21 February 2025, Carson joined National League North club Alfreton Town on an initial one-month loan. After making three league appearances for Alfreton, he joined fellow National League North side Radcliffe on 27 March for the remainder of the season.

Carson made 13 appearances in all competitions during his time with Grimsby. He was made available for transfer following the 2024–25 season and, on 10 September 2025, left the club after his contract was terminated by mutual consent.

=== Boston United ===
On 12 September 2025, Carson joined National League club Boston United on an initial contract until January 2026. He made his debut the following day, replacing Owen Hampson during a 1–1 draw away to Southend United.

Carson scored his first Boston goal on 27 September, converting a 20-yard free kick in a 1–1 draw at Sutton United. Having scored once in his first 21 appearances, he signed an extension on 15 January 2026 keeping him at the club until the end of the season.

His second goal was a 25-yard strike during a 6–3 victory away to Scunthorpe United on 14 February. Carson finished the season with two goals from 36 appearances in all competitions before leaving Boston at the expiration of his contract.

=== Solihull Moors ===
On 5 June 2026, Carson joined fellow National League club Solihull Moors, becoming manager Chris Millington's first signing ahead of the 2026–27 season. He made his competitive debut on the opening day of the season, starting in a 5–2 defeat away to Harrogate Town on 8 August.

On 29 September, Carson provided the pass for Jamie Andrews to score the final goal of a 4–2 victory at Woking.

== Style of play ==
Carson is an attacking left-back and an accomplished set-piece taker.

== Career statistics ==
As of match played 26 April 2025

Appearances and goals by club, season and competition
Club	Season	League			FA Cup		EFL Cup		Other		Total	
Club	Season	Division	Apps	Goals	Apps	Goals	Apps	Goals	Apps	Goals	Apps	Goals
Accrington Stanley	2021–22	League One	0	0	0	0	0	0	1 (Note: Appearance(s) in EFL Trophy)	0	1	0
Accrington Stanley	2022–23	League One	0	0	0	0	0	0	0	0	0	0
Accrington Stanley	Total		0	0	0	0	0	0	1	0	1	0
Carrick Rangers (loan)	2021–22	NIFL Premiership	14	4	1	0	0	0	0	0	15	4
AFC Telford United (loan)	2023–24	National League North	4	1	0	0	0	0	0	0	4	1
Stalybridge Celtic (loan)	2022–23	Northern Premier League; Premier Division	8	3	0	0	0	0	3 (Note: 2 appearances and 1 goal in Cheshire Senior Cup and 1 appearance in Manchester Premier Cup)	1	11	4
Reading	2022–23	Championship	0	0	0	0	0	0	0	0	0	0
Reading	2023–24	League One	10	0	2	0	2	0	3	0	17	0
Reading	Total		10	0	2	0	2	0	3	0	17	0
Grimsby Town	2024–25	League Two	9	0	0	0	1	0	3	0	13	0
Grimsby Town	2025–26	League Two	0	0	0	0	0	0	0	0	0	0
Grimsby Town	Total		9	0	0	0	1	0	3	0	13	0
Alfreton Town (loan)	2024–25	National League North	3	0	0	0	0	0	1	1	4	1
Radcliffe (loan)	2024–25	National League North	5	0	0	0	0	0	0	0	5	0
Career total			53	8	3	0	3	0	11	2	70	10
