= Andrew Sheldon =

Andrew Sheldon may refer to:

- Andrew Sheldon, co-founder of True North Productions
- Andrew Sheldon, character in Adventure in Baltimore
- Andy Sheldon, musician in The Samples

== See also ==
- Andrew Shelton (disambiguation)
