= Harvey Cribb =

English footballer (born 2006)

Personal information
- Full name: Harvey Charles George Cribb
- Date of birth: 21 January 2006 (age 20)
- Place of birth: England
- Position: Midfielder

Team information
- Current team: Grimsby Borough

Youth career
- 2014–2022: Scunthorpe United
- 2023–2024: Grimsby Town

Senior career*
Years	Team	Apps	(Gls)
2022–2023	Scunthorpe United	8	(0)
2024–2025	Grimsby Town	0	(0)
2024	→ Winterton Rangers (loan)	7	(0)
2024	→ Bridlington Town (loan)	10	(0)
2025	→ Grimsby Borough (loan)	5	(0)
2025	Lincoln United	0	(0)
2025	Cobh Ramblers	11	(0)
2025–2026	Lincoln United	12	(0)
2026–	Grimsby Borough	5	(1)
- * Club domestic league appearances and goals as of 17:00, 31 August 2026 (UTC)

Harvey Charles George Cribb (born 21 January 2006) is an English professional footballer who last played as a midfielder for Grimsby Borough

A youth product of Scunthorpe United, where he made his first-team debut in 2022, becoming the youngest used player in the club's history at 16 years, 36 days old. Cribb moved to Grimsby Town at the start of the 2023–24 season, joining the under 18s. A loan spell followed at Winterton Rangers in March 2024.

== Club career ==
=== Scunthorpe United ===
Cribb began his career with Scunthorpe United and made his professional debut on 26 February 2022 in a 4–1 defeat away at Sutton United. He became Scunthorpe's youngest player at the age of 16 years and 36 days.

=== Grimsby Town ===
Ahead of the 2023–24 season, Cribb joined League Two side Grimsby Town. In March 2024, Cribb joined Winterton Rangers on loan until the end of the season picking up player of the month during his spell at the rangers.

On 12 November 2024, following a two-month loan spell with Bridlington Town, Cribb made his senior debut for the club in a 3–2 EFL Trophy defeat to Chesterfield. In January 2025, he joined Northern Premier League Division One East side Grimsby Borough on a one-month loan deal.

On 7 May 2025, Grimsby announced the player would leave in June when his contract expired.

=== Lincoln United ===
On 25 July 2025, Cribb signed for Lincoln United.

=== Cobh Ramblers ===
On 31 July 2025, less than a week after signing for Lincoln United, Cribb signed for Cobh Ramblers of the League of Ireland

=== Grimsby Borough ===
On 11 June 2026, Cribb returned to Grimsby Borough on a permanent basis, having previously represented the club on loan during the 2024–25 season.

== Style of play ==
Cribb likes to get his foot in for tackles, as box-to-box central midfielder, who gets up and down the pitch.

== Career statistics ==
As of 28 January 2025

Appearances and goals by club, season and competition
Club	Season	League			FA Cup		League Cup		Other		Total	
Club	Season	Division	Apps	Goals	Apps	Goals	Apps	Goals	Apps	Goals	Apps	Goals
Scunthorpe United	2021–22	League Two	8	0	0	0	0	0	0	0	8	0
Scunthorpe United	2022–23	National League	0	0	0	0	—		0	0	0	0
Scunthorpe United	Total		8	0	0	0	0	0	0	0	8	0
Grimsby Town	2023–24	League Two	0	0	0	0	0	0	0	0	0	0
Grimsby Town	2024–25	League Two	0	0	0	0	0	0	1 (Note: Appearance(s) in EFL Trophy)	0	1	0
Grimsby Town	Total		0	0	0	0	0	0	1	0	1	0
Winterton Rangers (loan)	2023–24	NPL Division One East	7	0	0	0	—		0	0	7	0
Bridlington Town (loan)	2024–25	NPL Division One East	10	0	0	0	—		1 (Note: Appearance(s) in East Riding Senior Cup)	0	11	0
Grimsby Borough (loan)	2024–25	NPL Division One East	5	0	0	0	—		0	0	5	0
Career total			30	0	0	0	0	0	2	0	32	0
