= Andy Crosby =

English footballer and manager (born 1973)

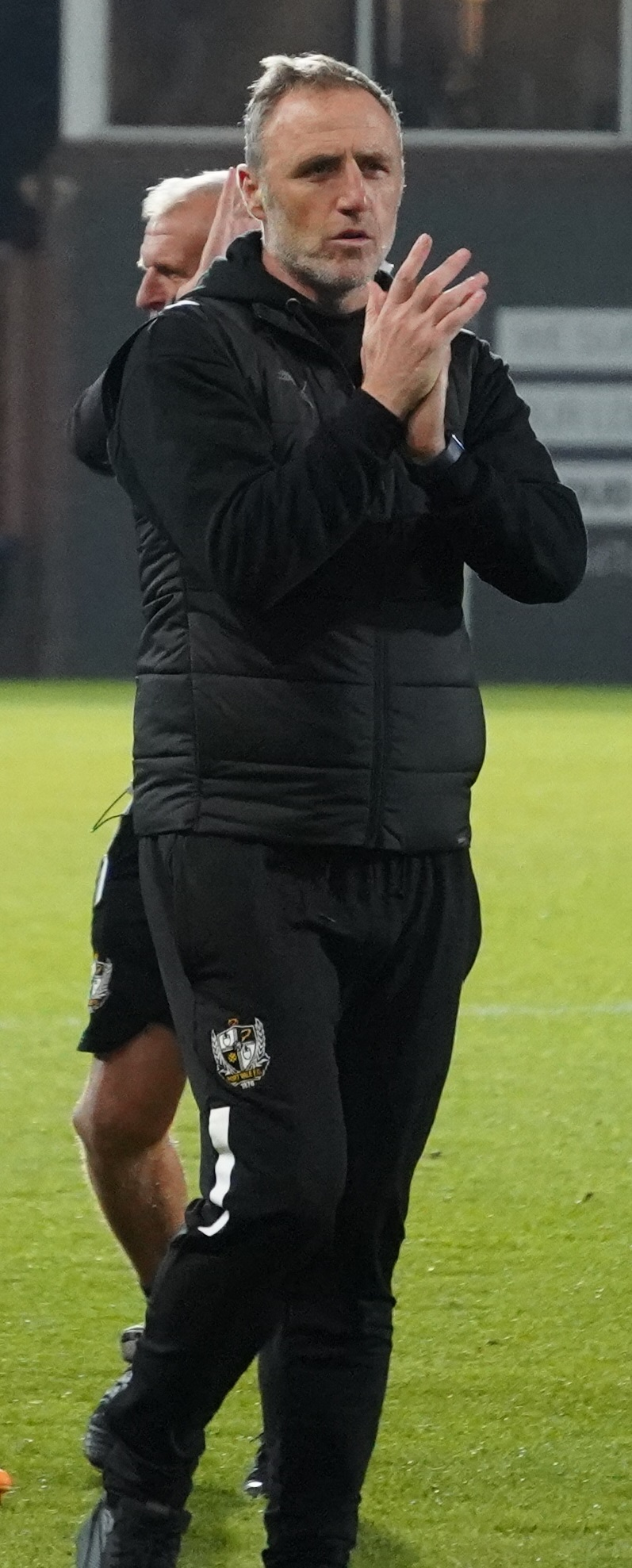
- Crosby as Port Vale manager in 2023

Personal information
- Full name: Andrew Keith Crosby
- Date of birth: 3 March 1973 (age 53)
- Place of birth: Rotherham, West Riding of Yorkshire, England
- Height: 6 ft 2 in (1.88 m)
- Position: Defender

Youth career
- 198?–1990: Leeds United

Senior career*
Years	Team	Apps	(Gls)
1990–1991	Leeds United	0	(0)
1991–1993	Doncaster Rovers	51	(0)
1993	→ Halifax Town (loan)	1	(0)
1993–1998	Darlington	181	(3)
1998–1999	Chester City	41	(4)
1999–2001	Brighton & Hove Albion	72	(5)
2001–2004	Oxford United	111	(12)
2004–2010	Scunthorpe United	167	(15)
Total		624	(39)

Managerial career
- 2020–2021: Northern Ireland U21 (caretaker)
- 2022: Port Vale (acting)
- 2023–2024: Port Vale
- 2025–2026: Tranmere Rovers
- * Club domestic league appearances and goals

Andrew Keith Crosby (born 3 March 1973) is an English professional football manager and former player who was most recently the manager at EFL League Two club Tranmere Rovers.

A defender during his playing days, he began his career at Leeds United, though he made his debut in the English Football League after joining Doncaster Rovers in July 1991. He spent two-and-a-half seasons with Rovers before moving on to Darlington in December 1993, following a brief loan spell with Halifax Town. He played 211 games for Darlington in a stay which lasted almost five years. He spent the 1998–99 season with Chester City and was sold to Brighton & Hove Albion for £10,000 in July 1999. He helped Brighton to win the Third Division title in the 2000–01 season before joining Oxford United on a free transfer in December 2001. He was named on the Third Division's PFA Team of the Year for the 2003–04 season and took a free transfer to Scunthorpe United in June 2004. He spent six seasons with Scunthorpe, winning three promotions: from League Two in 2004–05, with the League One title in 2006–07 and via the League One play-offs in 2009. He made 715 league and cup appearances during his 20-year playing career, scoring 43 goals.

He joined the backroom staff at Scunthorpe United. He would follow manager Nigel Adkins to Southampton, Reading, Sheffield United and Hull City. During his time at Southampton, the club would win successive promotions from League One into the Premier League in 2010–11 and 2011–12. He served as Northern Ireland U21's caretaker manager in 2020 and joined the coaching staff at Port Vale in March 2021. He served as Port Vale's acting manager during manager Darrell Clarke's absence in the latter half of the 2021–22 season. He became manager, initially on an interim basis, following Clarke's sacking in April 2023. Crosby spent ten months in the job before being sacked. He joined Tranmere Rovers as a coach and became the manager there in February 2025. He was sacked after 13 months in charge.

== Early life ==
Andrew Keith Crosby was born on 3 March 1973 in Rotherham, West Riding of Yorkshire. He grew up in the mining village of Maltby; his father was a lorry driver and miner, whilst his mother worked in the local shops. He grew up supporting Rotherham United but was rejected by the club as a player at the age of eleven.

== Playing career ==
=== Early career ===
Crosby began his football career as a trainee with Leeds United, having been with the club as a youth team player since at least 1987. He was released to Doncaster Rovers – managed by former Leeds boss Billy Bremner – after failing to break into the first-team at Elland Road. He featured 26 times in the 1991–92 season as Rovers finished 21st in the Fourth Division. The creation of the Premier League saw the Fourth Division renamed the Third Division, and Doncaster ended the 1992–93 season in 16th place under the stewardship of Steve Beaglehole. Crosby spent a brief part of the 1993–94 season on loan at Halifax Town, featuring just once for the Conference club. He played two reserve team games as a trialist for Wrexham.

=== Darlington ===
Crosby signed in December 1993 with Alan Murray's Darlington, which went on to end the 1993–94 campaign second-from-bottom of the Football League. Darlington also finished second-from-bottom in 1994–95, with Crosby clocking up 41 appearances. The "Quakers" improved under new manager Jim Platt, and Crosby played 55 games in the 1995–96 campaign as Darlington qualified for the play-offs after finishing in fifth place; he played in a back five alongside centre-backs Sean Gregan and Matty Appleby, supported by wing-backs Mark Barnard and Simon Shaw. He captained the club in their play-off final defeat to Plymouth Argyle, the club's first appearance at Wembley Stadium. However, Darlington returned to the lower half of the division under new manager David Hodgson, finishing 18th in 1996–97 and 19th in 1997–98, with Crosby bringing his final tally at Darlington to 211 league and cup appearances.

=== Chester City ===
He joined Chester City in July 1998, partnering with Matt Woods in central defence. Kevin Ratcliffe's "Seals" would finish 14th in the Third Division at the end of the 1998–99 season, with Crosby scoring four goals in 46 games and being sent off twice. He was transfer-listed by controversial owner Terry Smith and told the media that the club was "falling apart". Chester City were later ordered to pay Crosby £3,800 in outstanding bonuses and wages.

=== Brighton & Hove Albion ===
Crosby was sold to Brighton & Hove Albion for a fee of £10,000 in July 1999. He recovered from a "mysterious illness" that kept him in hospital for two nights in September 1999; it turned out to be caused by a virus in his left ear. He went on to make 41 appearances across the 1999–2000 campaign. He formed a strong centre-back partnership with Danny Cullip during the 2000–01 season as Brighton won promotion out of the Third Division as champions; he scored two goals in 39 games, including one goal scored with his ear against Blackpool. He had a "clear the air meeting" with manager Micky Adams in September 2001 after being dropped for Matt Wicks. Following the meeting he was transfer-listed at his own request after finding his first-team chances at the Withdean Stadium limited.

=== Oxford United ===
Crosby signed with Oxford United in December 2001. Ian Atkins led the "U's" to a 21st-place finish in the Third Division at the end of the 2001–02 season. Crosby scored seven goals from 53 appearances in the 2002–03 campaign – including winning goals against Bury, Leyton Orient, Lincoln City and Boston United – as Oxford came within a point of reaching the play-offs. He scored five goals in 46 games during the 2003–04 season – including winning goals against Carlisle United, Leyton Orient and Cheltenham Town – as the club this time finished three points outside the play-off places. Crosby was named on the PFA Team of the Year. He was offered a new contract by incoming manager Graham Rix on greatly reduced terms but decided to leave the Kassam Stadium to move closer to his family in the north of England.

=== Scunthorpe United ===
Crosby joined Scunthorpe United on a two-year contract in June 2004. Manager Brian Laws wanted to add experience to his young side, which he found in Crosby, Paul Musselwhite and Ian Baraclough. Together with existing veteran players Peter Beagrie and Steve Torpey, the five players had close to 2,500 games between them. He replaced Mark Jackson as club captain. Crosby formed a centre-back partnership with Andy Butler which would last for four seasons. He scored three goals from 48 games in the 2004–05 season as United won promotion out of League Two as runners-up to champions Yeovil Town. He also scored an own goal as the club were beaten by Chelsea in the FA Cup. He was again named on the PFA Team of the Year, along with teammate Peter Beagrie, as recognition for the team having the division's best defensive record with only 42 goals conceded, as compared to 73 goals conceded the previous season.

He recovered from a dip in form to feature 49 times in the 2005–06 campaign as Scunthorpe posted a 12th-place finish in League One. He was sent off in a defeat at Blackpool but scored in wins over Barnsley, Oldham Athletic, Hartlepool United and Chesterfield. Now playing alongside Steve Foster, he captained Scunthorpe to promotion as champions of League One at the end of the 2006–07 season, the club's first divisional trophy in 49 years. He scored three goals in September 2007, including a header that secured a 2–1 win over Preston North End, maintaining Scunthorpe's unbeaten record at Glanford Park at the start of the 2007–08 season. Crosby featured in 38 Championship games, but Scunthorpe were eventually relegated to League One after finishing second-from-bottom.

A knee injury restricted Crosby to just nine appearances during the 2008–09 campaign; Krystian Pearce and David Mirfin meanwhile established themselves at centre-back. Crosby's contribution proved crucial as Pearce was dropped due to injuries and loss of form with four regular season games left to play. Scunthorpe qualified for the play-offs, and Crosby converted his penalty in a shoot-out victory over Milton Keynes Dons in the semi-finals. He played the whole 90 minutes of the 3–2 victory over Millwall in the final – the last match of his 715-game career. Having been the club's assistant manager since November 2006, he focused on coaching for the 2009–10 season and did not make it onto the pitch as a player.

== Style of play ==
Crosby was an "uncompromising, no-nonsense, hard-tackling" defender with a strong 6 ft 2 in (1.88 m) frame. He had good leadership and organisational skills, being described as a "natural leader" by former Scunthorpe teammate Paul Musselwhite. He was a penalty kick specialist and missed just one in his career, though he scored from the rebound. He was nicknamed 'Crozzer' whilst at Scunthorpe.

== Coaching career ==
=== Backroom roles ===
"When I first took charge at Scunthorpe I said 'Don't tell me what I want to hear, tell me as it is' and he's excellent at doing that. You've got to have trust in somebody and I've got total trust in Andy Crosby."

— Nigel Adkins speaking in August 2018.

Following Brian Laws's move to Sheffield Wednesday on 6 November 2006, Nigel Adkins became Scunthorpe United's caretaker manager with Crosby and Ian Baraclough as his assistants. Adkins was given the job permanently the following month, and it was reported by the BBC that "the position of assistant manager will be reviewed in the close season", with Crosby, Baraclough and Tony Daws supporting Adkins until then.

On 12 September 2010, Crosby joined Southampton as assistant to manager Nigel Adkins. The pair took the club from League One to the Premier League with successive promotions in 2010–11 and 2011–12. He was dismissed, along with Adkins, on 18 January 2013. The decision to sack Adkins proved highly unpopular with Southampton supporters, who waved white handkerchiefs at St Mary's Stadium to show their displeasure with chairman Nicola Cortese's decision to replace Adkins with former Espanyol manager Mauricio Pochettino.

On 26 March 2013, he reunited with Adkins as he became his assistant at Reading. Crosby said the pair had tried to continue the work done by popular former manager Brian McDermott; however, Reading were relegated from the Premier League at the end of the 2012–13 season. Crosby was strongly linked with the vacant management position at Scunthorpe United in November 2013. Reading aimed for an immediate promotion but narrowly missed out on the Championship play-offs in 2013–14, and Adkins and Crosby were sacked in December 2014.

On 2 June 2015, Crosby joined Adkins as his assistant at Sheffield United. Adkins was sacked in May 2016 after overseeing an 11th-place finish in League One during the 2015–16 season. On 7 December 2017, Crosby was appointed as Adkins's assistant at Hull City on an 18-month contract. During these 18 months Hull would avoid relegation out of the Championship at the end of the 2017–18 season and then finish 13th in the 2018–19 season. In June 2019, Adkins announced that he would be leaving Hull City, together with Crosby. Crosby said that they had decided not to renew their contracts as the wage bill had been cut and the playing squad needed a rebuild.

He began working as Ian Baraclough's assistant in the Northern Ireland U21 coaching set-up before being appointed as caretaker manager after Baraclough was promoted to the senior team management position in August 2020. Baraclough described him as "a safe pair of hands". Crosby named his squad at the end of August and took charge for the remaining five group games of the 2021 UEFA European Under-21 Championship qualification. He won his first game as a manager on 4 September, a 2–0 win over Malta, and said that "it's a great opportunity for me as this is a really good group and Ian has put together a really good culture". However a 1–0 defeat to Denmark at the Ballymena Showgrounds on 8 September ended the team's chances of qualification. The rest of the campaign saw a defeat at home to Finland and a home win and away loss to Ukraine. Northern Ireland finished fifth in the group, and it was reported in January 2021 that Crosby was expected to be given the manager's job on a permanent basis.

=== Port Vale ===
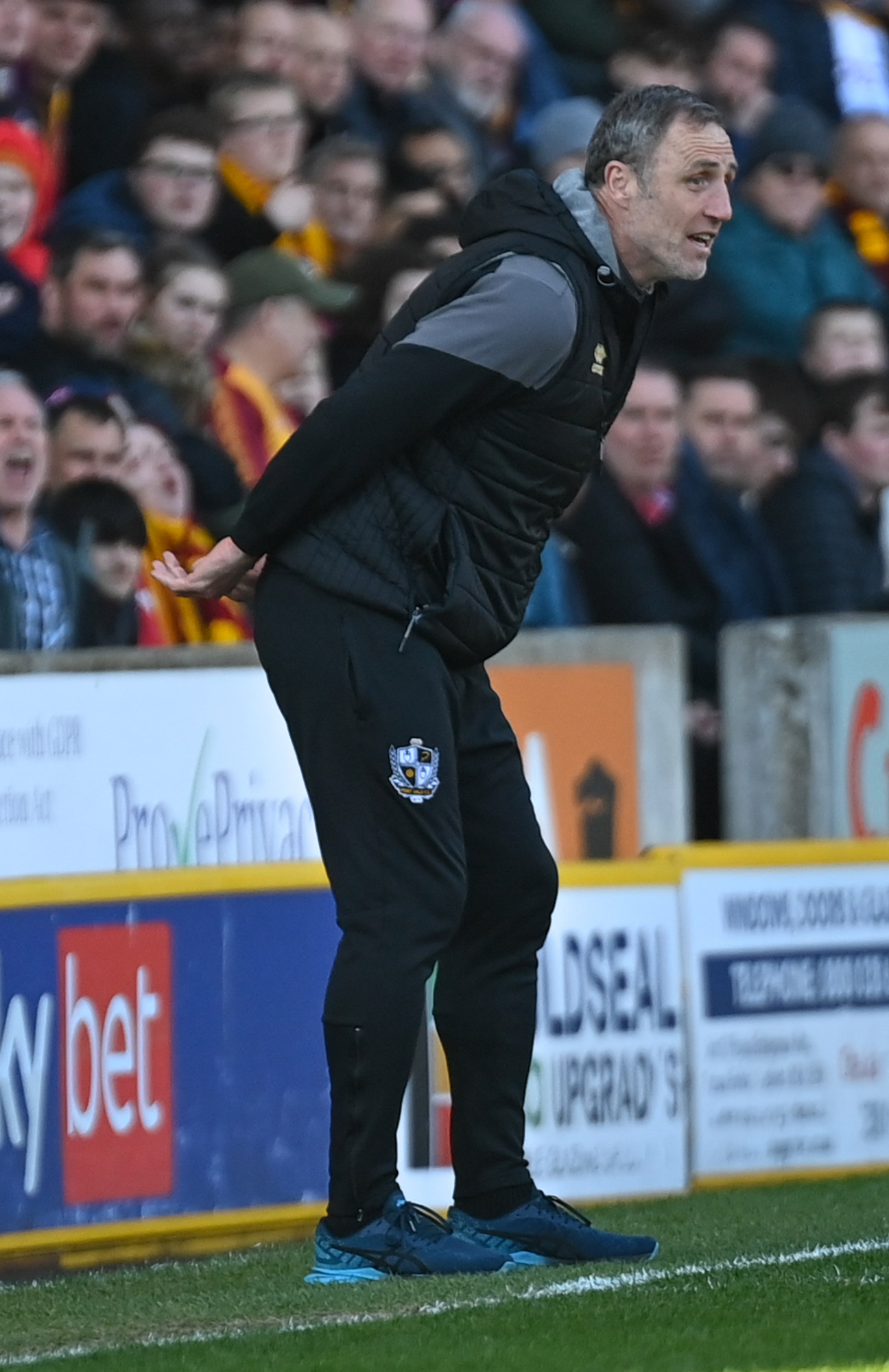
Crosby as Port Vale acting manager in 2022

In March 2021, he joined the coaching staff at Port Vale until the end of the season. He extended his contract at Vale Park in June 2021, at which point both manager Darrell Clarke and director of football David Flitcroft emphasised his importance to the club. He stepped down from his management position at Northern Ireland in order to concentrate fully on his role at Vale Park. On 15 February 2022, Clarke took a period of leave after a close family bereavement, with Crosby standing in during his absence. Clarke completed a phased return to the manager role on 6 May. With permission from Clarke, Crosby led the team out at Wembley in the play-off final as Vale secured promotion with a 3–0 win over Mansfield Town. Crosby became interim manager after Clarke was sacked on 17 April 2023 following a run of two wins in 18 League One matches. He won one and lost three of the final four games of the 2022–23 season before stating that he believed himself ready to take the job on a permanent basis. He was confirmed as the club's permanent manager on 12 May.

Crosby appointed a new club captain in 27-year-old stalwart Nathan Smith, with Funso Ojo as vice-captain. Vale opened the 2023–24 season with a 7–0 defeat at Barnsley, the biggest opening day defeat for any team in the EFL since the 1962–63 season over 60 years ago. His team responded with ten points from the remaining twelve on offer in August, earning him a nomination for the EFL League One Manager of the Month award. He led the Vale into the quarter-finals of the EFL Cup for the first time in the club's history with wins over Fleetwood Town, Crewe Alexandra, Sutton United and Mansfield Town. However, a poor run of form followed, and his substitutions and reliance on sports science were criticised after the team exited the FA Cup having thrown away a two-goal lead at home to Stevenage. Ultimately, Crosby lasted less than a year. After one win in eight games, with the club in 20th place, he was sacked on 5 February 2024.

=== Tranmere Rovers ===
Crosby joined Tranmere Rovers as a coach on a short-term basis in December 2024, reuniting again with manager Nigel Adkins. Crosby stepped up to become the club's caretaker manager after Adkins was sacked on 26 February 2025. After going unbeaten in his first three games, Crosby was confirmed as the interim manager until the end of the 2024–25 season. His team gained 20 points from 12 games to secure their League Two status with one game to spare. On 14 May 2025, he was appointed as permanent manager. Crosby was sacked on 4 March 2026 following a run of 10 losses in 11 games that left the club 19th in the table.

== Career statistics ==
=== Playing statistics ===
Appearances and goals by club, season and competition
Club	Season	League			FA Cup		League Cup		Other		Total	
Club	Season	Division	Apps	Goals	Apps	Goals	Apps	Goals	Apps	Goals	Apps	Goals
Leeds United	1990–91	First Division	0	0	0	0	0	0	0	0	0	0
Doncaster Rovers	1991–92	Fourth Division	22	0	2	0	0	0	2 (Note: Appearance(s) in the Football League Trophy.)	0	26	0
Doncaster Rovers	1992–93	Third Division	29	0	0	0	2	0	2	1	33	1
Doncaster Rovers	1993–94	Third Division	0	0	0	0	0	0	1	0	1	0
Doncaster Rovers	Total		51	0	2	0	2	0	5	1	60	1
Halifax Town (loan)	1993–94	Football Conference	1	0	0	0	0	0	0	0	1	0
Darlington	1993–94	Third Division	25	0	0	0	0	0	0	0	25	0
Darlington	1994–95	Third Division	35	0	2	0	2	0	2	0	41	0
Darlington	1995–96	Third Division	45	1	3	0	2	0	5 (Note: 2 appearances in the Football League Trophy and 3 appearances in the play-offs.)	0	55	1
Darlington	1996–97	Third Division	42	1	2	1	4	0	1	0	49	2
Darlington	1997–98	Third Division	34	1	4	0	2	0	1	0	41	1
Darlington	Total		181	3	11	1	10	0	9	0	211	4
Chester City	1998–99	Third Division	41	4	1	0	3	0	1	0	46	4
Brighton & Hove Albion	1999–2000	Third Division	36	3	1	0	2	0	2	0	41	3
Brighton & Hove Albion	2000–01	Third Division	34	2	1	0	1	0	2	0	39	2
Brighton & Hove Albion	2001–02	Second Division	2	0	0	0	0	0	3	0	5	0
Brighton & Hove Albion	Total		72	5	2	0	3	0	7	0	84	5
Oxford United	2001–02	Third Division	23	1	0	0	0	0	0	0	23	1
Oxford United	2002–03	Third Division	46	6	3	0	3	0	1	1	53	7
Oxford United	2003–04	Third Division	42	5	1	0	2	0	1	0	46	5
Oxford United	Total		111	12	4	0	5	0	2	1	122	13
Scunthorpe United	2004–05	League Two	44	3	3	0	1	0	0	0	48	3
Scunthorpe United	2005–06	League One	42	3	3	0	2	0	2	1	49	4
Scunthorpe United	2006–07	League One	39	5	3	0	1	0	2	0	45	5
Scunthorpe United	2007–08	Championship	38	4	1	0	1	0	0	0	40	4
Scunthorpe United	2008–09	League One	4	0	0	0	0	0	5	0	9	0
Scunthorpe United	2009–10	Championship	0	0	0	0	0	0	0	0	0	0
Scunthorpe United	Total		167	15	10	0	5	0	9	1	191	16
Career total			624	39	30	1	28	0	33	3	715	43

=== Managerial statistics ===
As of match played 3 March 2026

Managerial record by team and tenure
Team	From	To	Record					Ref.
Team	From	To	P	W	D	L	Win %	Ref.
Northern Ireland U21 (caretaker)	4 September 2020	9 June 2021	5	2	0	3	40.0	
Port Vale (acting) (Note: Darrell Clarke entered a period of compassionate leave of absence on 15 February 2022 to 6 May 2022 following a close family bereavement, with Crosby taking charge of first-team affairs in his absence.)	15 February 2022	6 May 2022	17	9	4	4	52.9	
Port Vale	17 April 2023	5 February 2024	44	14	11	19	31.8	
Tranmere Rovers	26 February 2025	4 March 2026	54	17	15	22	31.5	
Total			120	42	30	48	35.0	

== Honours ==
Brighton & Hove Albion

- Football League Third Division: 2000–01

Scunthorpe United

- Football League One: 2006–07; play-offs: 2009
- Football League Two second place promotion: 2004–05

Individual

- PFA Team of the Year: 2003–04 Third Division, 2004–05 League Two
