= Doug Tharme =

English footballer

Personal information
- Full name: Douglas John Tharme
- Date of birth: 17 August 1999 (age 27)
- Place of birth: Birkenhead, England
- Height: 1.83 m (6 ft 0 in)
- Position: Defender

Team information
- Current team: Grimsby Town
- Number: 24

Youth career
- 2014–2017: Wrexham

Senior career*
Years	Team	Apps	(Gls)
2017–2020	Wrexham	4	(0)
2019	→ AFC Telford United (loan)	1	(0)
2019	→ Tamworth (loan)	1	(0)
2020–2021	Curzon Ashton	12	(0)
2021	Connah's Quay Nomads	4	(0)
2021–2022	Southport	32	(3)
2022–2024	Blackpool	0	(0)
2022–2023	→ Accrington Stanley (loan)	31	(0)
2024–	Grimsby Town	55	(2)
- * Club domestic league appearances and goals as of 18:16, 17 October 2026 (UTC)

Douglas John Tharme (born 17 August 1999) is an English professional footballer who plays as a defender for EFL League Two club Grimsby Town.

== Career ==
=== Wrexham ===
Tharme joined the youth system of Wrexham at under-16 level and progressed through the club's academy. He made his senior debut aged 18 on 16 December 2017, starting as Wrexham were eliminated from the FA Trophy following a 2–0 home defeat by Harrogate Town.

Tharme made his National League debut in a 2–2 draw against Bromley on 25 August 2018. He made four league appearances during the 2018–19 season and later appeared three times for Wrexham in the Scottish Challenge Cup during 2019–20.

On 25 July 2019, Tharme joined AFC Telford United on loan. The loan ended after making one league appearance. He subsequently joined Tamworth on loan in December 2019.

In January 2020, Tharme joined Gainsborough Trinity on an initial one-month loan. The following month, he moved to Radcliffe on loan for the remainder of the season.

=== Curzon Ashton and Connah's Quay Nomads ===
Tharme left Wrexham during the summer of 2020 and signed for Curzon Ashton. He made 12 league appearances for the club during the curtailed 2020–21 National League North season.

On 2 February 2021, Tharme joined Cymru Premier club Connah's Quay Nomads. He made four league appearances during the remainder of the season.

=== Southport ===
Tharme returned to English football with Southport ahead of the 2021–22 season. He established himself as a first-team regular, making 32 National League North appearances and scoring three league goals. Tharme also started in Southport's 2–1 victory over West Didsbury & Chorlton in the 2022 Lancashire Challenge Trophy final.

=== Blackpool ===
On 1 February 2022, Blackpool signed Tharme for an undisclosed fee; he agreed a two-and-a-half-year contract containing an option for a further year and was loaned back to Southport for the remainder of the season.

On 15 August 2022, Tharme joined EFL League One club Accrington Stanley on a season-long loan. He made 31 league appearances and 37 appearances in all competitions during the 2022–23 season.

After returning to Blackpool, Tharme made his competitive debut for the club as a substitute in a 2–0 EFL Cup victory away to Derby County on 8 August 2023. He made five cup appearances for Blackpool during the first half of the 2023–24 season but did not make a league appearance for the club.

=== Grimsby Town ===
On 12 January 2024, Tharme signed for Grimsby Town for an undisclosed fee until the end of the 2025–26 season.

He scored on his debut for the club, in a 2–1 league defeat at home to Tranmere Rovers on 27 January 2024.

He made a further 28 league appearances during 2024–25. On 5 December 2025, Tharme extended his stay at Grimsby by signing a new two-and-a-half year contract until the summer of 2028.

In January 2026, he sustained a hamstring injury during a league match against Barnet. Scans determined that the injury required surgery, which he underwent later that month.

== Career statistics ==
As of match played 17 October 2026

Appearances and goals by club, season and competition
Club	Season	League			FA Cup		EFL Cup		Other		Total	
Club	Season	Division	Apps	Goals	Apps	Goals	Apps	Goals	Apps	Goals	Apps	Goals
Wrexham	2018–19	National League	4	0	0	0	—		0	0	4	0
Wrexham	2019–20	National League	0	0	0	0	—		3 (Note: Appearance(s) in Scottish Challenge Cup)	0	3	0
Wrexham	Total		4	0	0	0	0	0	3	0	7	0
AFC Telford United (loan)	2019–20	National League North	1	0	0	0	—		0	0	1	0
Tamworth (loan)	2019–20	Southern Prem Central	1	0	0	0	—		0	0	1	0
Curzon Ashton	2020–21	National League North	12	0	0	0	—		0	0	12	0
Connah's Quay Nomads	2020–21	Cymru Premier	4	0	0	0	—		0	0	4	0
Southport	2021–22	National League North	32	3	0	0	—		0	0	32	3
Accrington Stanley (loan)	2022–23	League One	31	0	2	0	0	0	4 (Note: Appearance(s) in EFL Trophy)	0	37	0
Blackpool	2023–24	League One	0	0	0	0	1	0	4	0	5	0
Grimsby Town	2023–24	League Two	15	1	0	0	0	0	0	0	15	1
Grimsby Town	2024–25	League Two	28	1	0	0	0	0	3	0	31	1
Grimsby Town	2025–26	League Two	11	0	1	0	1	0	1	0	14	0
Grimsby Town	2026–27	League Two	1	0	0	0	0	0	2	0	3	0
Grimsby Town	Total		55	2	1	0	1	0	6	0	63	2
Career total			140	5	3	0	2	0	17	0	162	5
