= Justin Obikwu =

Professional footballer (born 2004)

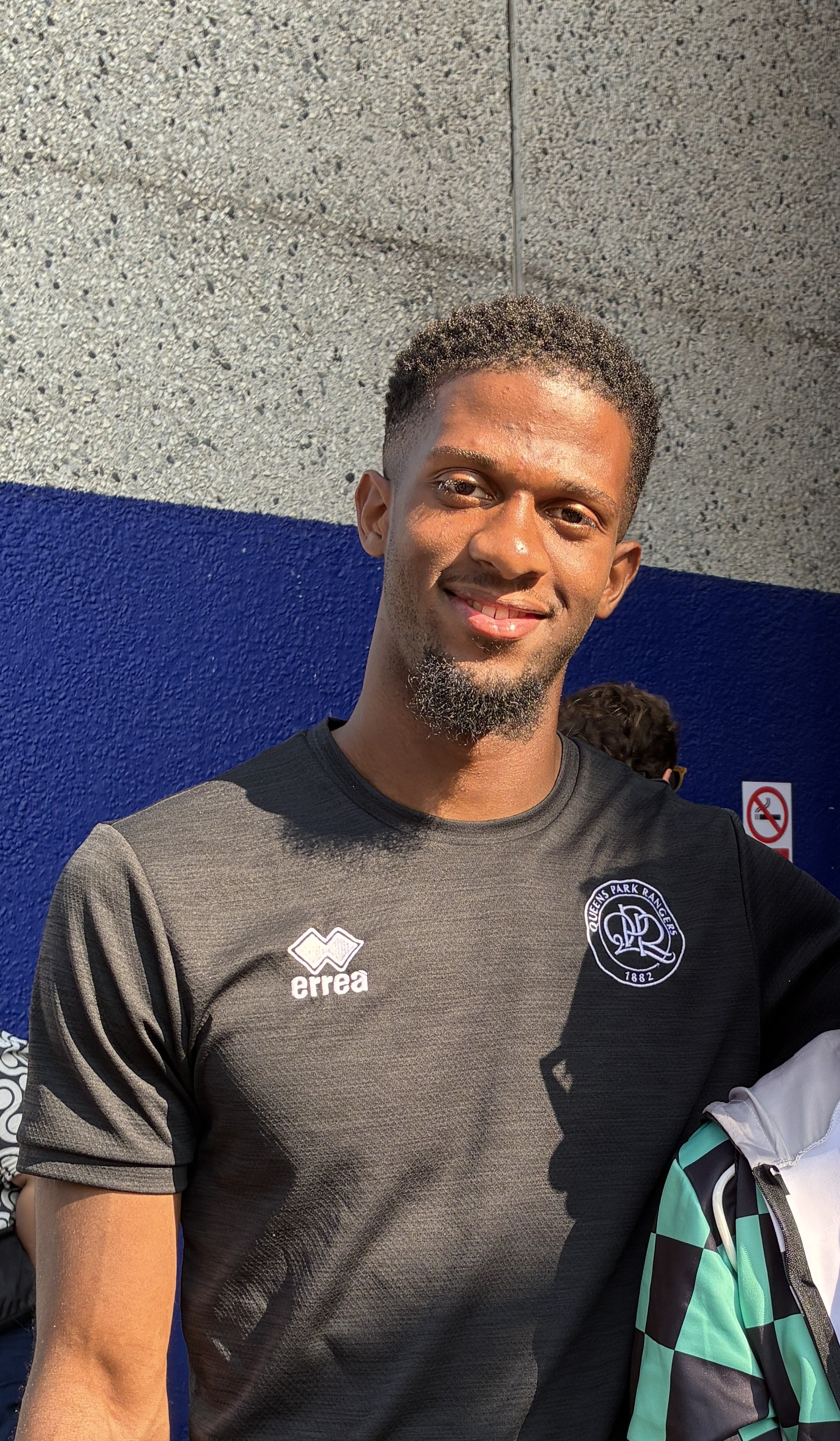
- Obikwu in 2026

Personal information
- Full name: Justin Patrick Nnamdi Obikwu
- Date of birth: 8 February 2004 (age 22)
- Place of birth: Brent, England
- Height: 1.94 m (6 ft 4 in)
- Position: Forward

Team information
- Current team: Queens Park Rangers
- Number: 25

Youth career
- Harefield United
- 2021–2023: Coventry City

Senior career*
Years	Team	Apps	(Gls)
2023–2026	Coventry City	0	(0)
2024	→ Grimsby Town (loan)	16	(3)
2024–2025	→ Grimsby Town (loan)	19	(7)
2025–2026	→ Lincoln City (loan)	17	(3)
2026–	Queens Park Rangers	3	(0)

International career^{‡}
2024–	Trinidad and Tobago	4	(0)
- * Club domestic league appearances and goals as of 13:38, 8 November 2026 (UTC) ‡ National team caps and goals as of 08:33, 11 October 2025 (UTC)

Justin Patrick Nnamdi Obikwu (born 8 February 2004) is a professional footballer who plays as a forward for Queens Park Rangers. Born in England, he represents Trinidad and Tobago at international level.

== Club career ==
=== Coventry City ===
After playing for Harefield United's under-18 team, he signed for Coventry City, mainly playing for their under-21 team, before signing his first professional contract in July 2023.

Obikwu signed on loan for EFL League Two side Grimsby Town in January 2024 until the end of the season. He scored his first professional senior goal in a 1–1 draw away to Sutton United on 9 March 2024.

He returned on loan to Grimsby Town on 30 August 2024 until the end of the 2024–25 season.

On 1 September 2025 he joined League One club Lincoln City on loan for the duration of the 2025–26 season. He made his debut on 13 September when he came off the bench to replace James Collins in a 1–0 victory away to Burton Albion. He scored his first goal for Lincoln City in the following game, scoring the second goal in a 3–1 win against Luton Town. On 17 January 2026, Obikwu was recalled by Coventry City, having scored 3 goals in 21 games for Lincoln City.

=== Queens Park Rangers ===
On 19 January 2026, Obikwu signed for fellow Championship club Queens Park Rangers for a reported initial fee of £500,000.

== International career ==
In February 2024, he was called up to the Trinidad and Tobago team for the first time for two friendlies against Jamaica. On 1 March 2024, he made his international debut, starting in a 1–0 loss.

== Personal life ==
Obikwu is of Nigerian and Trinidadian descent.

== Career statistics ==
=== Club ===
As of 7 November 2026

Appearances and goals by club, season and competition
Club	Season	League			FA Cup		EFL Cup		Other		Total	
Club	Season	Division	Apps	Goals	Apps	Goals	Apps	Goals	Apps	Goals	Apps	Goals
Coventry City	2023–24	Championship	0	0	0	0	0	0	—		0	0
Grimsby Town (loan)	2023–24	League Two	16	3	0	0	0	0	0	0	16	3
Grimsby Town (loan)	2024–25	League Two	19	7	1	0	0	0	2 (Note: Appearance(s) in EFL Trophy)	0	22	7
Lincoln City (loan)	2025–26	League One	17	3	1	0	1	0	2	0	21	3
Queens Park Rangers	2025–26	Championship	0	0	0	0	0	0	0	0	0	0
Queens Park Rangers	2026–27	Championship	3	0	0	0	0	0	0	0	3	0
Queens Park Rangers	Total		3	0	0	0	0	0	0	0	3	0
Career total			55	13	2	0	1	0	4	0	62	13

=== International ===
As of 10 October 2025

Appearances and goals by national team and year
National team	Year	Apps	Goals
Trinidad and Tobago	2024	1	0
Trinidad and Tobago	2025	3	0
Total		4	0
