= Michael Blackwood (footballer) =

English footballer

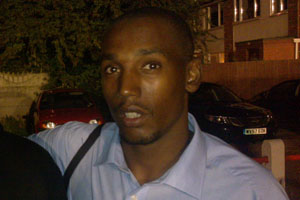
- Blackwood in August 2009

Personal information
- Full name: Michael Andrew Blackwood
- Date of birth: 30 September 1979 (age 47)
- Place of birth: Birmingham, England
- Height: 1.73 m (5 ft 8 in)
- Positions: Defender; midfielder

Senior career*
Years	Team	Apps	(Gls)
1998–2000	Aston Villa	0	(0)
1999	→ Chester City (loan)	9	(2)
2000–2002	Wrexham	46	(2)
2002	Worcester City	7	(0)
2002–2003	Stevenage Borough	18	(2)
2003	Halesowen Town	7	(2)
2003–2004	Telford United	35	(3)
2004–2005	Lincoln City	9	(0)
2005–2008	Kidderminster Harriers	100	(4)
2008	→ Oxford United (loan)	7	(0)
2008–2009	Mansfield Town	25	(3)
2009	→ Tamworth (loan)	9	(0)
2009–2010	Tamworth	22	(2)
2010–2011	Brackley Town		
2010–2011	→ Solihull Moors (loan)	5	(0)
2011–2014	Solihull Moors	84	(3)
2015–2016	Lichfield City		
Total		383	(23)
- * Club domestic league appearances and goals

Michael Blackwood (born 30 September 1979 in Birmingham, England) is an English former professional footballer who last played for Lichfield City, where he played as a defender, and on occasion as a midfielder.

== Playing career ==
Blackwood began his career as a trainee at Aston Villa in 1998 and had a loan spell at Chester City during the 1999–00 season before joining Wrexham on a free transfer in June 2000, where he made over 45 appearances in two seasons. He dropped into non-league football, playing for Worcester City, Stevenage Borough, Halesowen Town, during the 2002–03 season. He joined Telford United in August 2003 after impressing in pre-season friendlies, and made 35 league appearances for Telford in the 2003–04 season.

=== Lincoln City ===
Having trialled for the club in August 2002, appearing for the reserves in a 2–1 home defeat to York City's reserves on 28 August 2002, Blackwood returned to Football League in July 2004, joining League Two side Lincoln City on a one-year contract after impressing in a trial spell. He started the season in the first team, making his debut in the 1–0 League Two victory at Shrewsbury Town on 7 August 2004, but a ruptured abdominal muscle sustained in late August saw him out of action for four months. He struggled to make an impression at the club in the second half of the season, turning down the opportunity to join Tamworth on loan in February, and departed Sincil Bank by mutual consent on 26 May 2005.

=== Return to the non-leagues ===
He was released by Lincoln at the end of the 2004–05 season and joined Conference National side Kidderminster Harriers, where he made over 100 appearances, before joining Oxford United in January 2008 on loan for the remainder of the 2007–08 season. Blackwood returned to Kidderminster before his loan at Oxford ended due to injury problem and neither club offered him a new contract at the end of the season. He joined Mansfield Town in July 2008. Blackwood joined Conference North side Tamworth on loan from Mansfield in March 2009. He made his debut in the 3–2 victory away at Hucknall Town.

Blackwood returned to Mansfield Town following his loan spell with Tamworth, and was told he would be released from Mansfield Town, at the end of his contract on 5 May 2009. On 25 June 2010, it was announced that he had signed for Brackley Town. In October 2010 he joined Solihull Moors on loan, returning to Brackley at the beginning of January 2011.

In August 2011 he joined Solihull Moors on a permanent basis.

During the 2015/16 season, Blackwood has turned out for Midland Football League side Lichfield City.
