= Tony Hemmings =

English footballer (born 1967)

Personal information
- Full name: Anthony Hemmings
- Date of birth: 21 September 1967 (age 59)
- Place of birth: Burton upon Trent, England
- Position: Midfielder

Senior career*
Years	Team	Apps	(Gls)
?–1992	Rocester		
1992–1993	Northwich Victoria	5	(1)
1993–1995	Wycombe Wanderers	49	(12)
1995–1996	Macclesfield Town	43	(4)
1996–1999	Hednesford Town	1	(1)
1999	Gloucester City		
1999	Altrincham	2	(0)
1999–2000	Ilkeston Town		
2000	Chester City	19	(2)
2000–2001	Carlisle United	22	(0)
2001–2003	Ilkeston Town		
2003	Tamworth		
2003–2005	Alfreton Town		
2005–2009	Gresley Rovers		

Managerial career
- Stapenhill
- 2013–2015: Ashby Ivanhoe
- 2015–2016: Kimberley Miners Welfare
- * Club domestic league appearances and goals

Anthony Hemmings (born 21 September 1967) is an English former professional footballer who played as a midfielder.

Hemmings spent the bulk of his playing career outside the Football League, with only Wycombe Wanderers, Chester City (who were relegated to the Football Conference after his half-season there in 1999–2000) and Carlisle United enjoying his presence in league circles – the latter two coming after being signed by Ian Atkins.

While with Macclesfield Town in 1996, Hemmings scored at Wembley Stadium when the Silkmen beat Cheshire rivals Northwich Victoria in the FA Trophy final.

He managed Stapenhill before joining Ashby Ivanhoe as manager in May 2013. He left the club in April 2015, and subsequently managed Kimberley Miners Welfare between September 2015 and February 2016.

He is the father of current footballer Kane Hemmings.
