= Goran Milosavijevic =

Yugoslav footballer

Personal information
- Full name: Goran Milosavijevic
- Date of birth: 11 April 1967 (age 59)
- Place of birth: Kraljevo, Yugoslavia
- Position: Midfielder

Senior career*
| Years | Team | Apps | (Gls) |
| 1996–1997 | VfB Oldenburg | 20 | (2) |
| 1999–2000 | Chester City | 12 | (0) |
- * Club domestic league appearances and goals

Goran Milosavijevic (born 11 April 1967) is a footballer who played as a midfielder in the Football League for Chester City. Besides Serbia, he has played in France and England.
