= Darren Wright (footballer, born 1979) =

English footballer

Personal information
- Full name: Darren Fredrick Wright
- Date of birth: 7 September 1979 (age 47)
- Place of birth: Warrington, England
- Position: Right back

Senior career*
Years	Team	Apps	(Gls)
1995–2002	Chester City	48	(2)
- * Club domestic league appearances and goals

Darren Wright (born 7 September 1979) is an English footballer, who played as a right back in the Football League for Chester City.
