= Danny Carson =

English footballer

Personal information
- Full name: Daniel Carson
- Date of birth: 2 February 1981 (age 45)
- Place of birth: Huyton, England
- Position: Midfielder

Senior career*
Years	Team	Apps	(Gls)
1998–1999	Chester City	2	(0)
- * Club domestic league appearances and goals

Danny Carson (born 2 February 1981) is an English footballer, who played as a midfielder in the Football League for Chester City.
