= Paul Berry (footballer, born 1978) =

English footballer

Personal information
- Date of birth: 6 December 1978 (age 47)
- Place of birth: Warrington, England
- Position: Midfielder

Senior career*
Years	Team	Apps	(Gls)
1998-1999	Warrington Town	31	(10)
1999-2000	Chester City	9	(1)
- * Club domestic league appearances and goals

Paul Berry (born 6 December 1978) is an English former professional footballer who played as a midfielder for non league side Warrington Town AFC before playing in the Football League for Chester City.
