= Matt Woods (footballer, born 1976) =

English footballer

Personal information
- Full name: Matthew James Woods
- Date of birth: 9 September 1976 (age 50)
- Place of birth: Gosport, England
- Position: Defender

Senior career*
Years	Team	Apps	(Gls)
1996–2000	Chester City	135	(4)
- Stalybridge Celtic
- * Club domestic league appearances and goals

Matt Woods (born 9 September 1976) is an English footballer, who played as a defender in the Football League for Chester City.
