= Andy Shelton =

English footballer

Personal information
- Full name: Andrew Marc Shelton
- Date of birth: 19 June 1980 (age 46)
- Place of birth: Sutton Coldfield, England
- Height: 6 ft 0 in (1.83 m)
- Position: Midfielder

Team information
- Current team: Christleton

Youth career
- 1996–1998: Chester City

Senior career*
Years	Team	Apps	(Gls)
1998–2000	Chester City	38	(1)
2000–2002	Harrogate Town		
2002	Ossett Albion		
2002	Caernarfon Town	8	(0)
2002–2003	Hyde United	4	(0)
2003–2004	Ossett Town		
2004–	Christleton		
- * Club domestic league appearances and goals as of 6 January 2008

Andrew Marc Shelton (born 19 June 1980) is an English footballer who played in the Football League for Chester City. He is the son of former Sheffield Wednesday midfielder Gary Shelton, who was assistant manager at Chester when Andy was part of the first-team squad from 1998 to 2000.

Shelton made his Chester debut on 18 April 1998 as a substitute during a 3–1 win over Colchester United. He went on to make 48 first-team appearances for the club before moving on to Harrogate Town in December 2000. He went on to play for Ossett Albion, Caernarfon Town, Hyde United and Ossett Town before joining Chester-based Christleton of the West Cheshire Amateur Football League. He was still playing there at the midway stage of the 2007–08 season.
