= 2023–24 Accrington Stanley F.C. season =

55th season in existence of Accrington Stanley FC

Accrington Stanley
2023–24 season
- Owner: Andy Holt
- Manager: John Coleman (until 3 March); John Doolan (from 22 March)
- Stadium: Crown Ground
- League Two: 17th
- FA Cup: First round
- EFL Cup: First round
- EFL Trophy: Third round
- Top goalscorer: League: Jack Nolan (17); All: Jack Nolan (17)
- Highest home attendance: 5,261 vs Wrexham, League Two, 18 November 2023
- Lowest home attendance: 687 vs Nottingham Forest U21, EFL Trophy, 21 November 2023
- Average home league attendance: 2,560
| Home colours | Away colours |

The 2023–24 season was the 55th season in the history of Accrington Stanley and their first season back in League Two since the 2017–18 season following relegation from League One in the previous season. The club participated in League Two, the FA Cup, the EFL Cup, and the 2023–24 EFL Trophy.

== Current squad ==
As of 16 March 2024

| No. | Name | Position | Nationality | Place of birth | Date of birth (age) | Previous club | Date signed | Fee | Contract end |
Goalkeepers
| 1 | Toby Savin | GK | (England) | Southport | 4 May 2001 (age 25) | Academy | 1 July 2019 | Trainee | 30 June 2024 |
| 13 | Liam Isherwood | GK | (England) | Clitheroe | 13 July 2002 (age 24) | Academy | 1 July 2020 | Trainee | 30 June 2024 |
| 21 | Radek Vítek | GK | (Czech Republic) | Vsetín | 24 October 2003 (age 23) | Manchester United | 25 January 2024 | Loan | 31 May 2024 |
| 41 | Oliver Riva | GK | (England) | | 1 December 2005 (age 20) | Academy | 20 November 2023 | Trainee | 30 June 2024 |
| 61 | Jack McIntyre | GK | (England) | Manchester | 18 October 2002 (age 24) | Radcliffe | 11 August 2023 | Free | 30 June 2024 |
Defenders
| 2 | Lewis Shipley | CB | (England) | Cambridge | 29 November 2003 (age 22) | Norwich City | 22 July 2023 | Loan | 31 May 2024 |
| 3 | Jay Rich-Baghuelou | CB | (Australia) | Sydney | 22 October 1999 (age 27) | Crystal Palace | 14 January 2022 | Undisclosed | 30 June 2025 |
| 4 | Kelvin Mellor | RB | (England) | Crewe | 25 January 1991 (age 35) | Crewe Alexandra | 21 July 2023 | Free | 30 June 2024 |
| 5 | Brad Hills | CB | (England) | Norwich | 10 March 2004 (age 22) | Norwich City | 17 July 2023 | Loan | 31 May 2024 |
| 14 | Rosaire Longelo | RB | (England) | (Democratic Republic of the Congo) Kinshasa | 20 October 1999 (age 27) | Newcastle United | 7 January 2022 | Undisclosed | 30 June 2024 |
| 15 | Baba Fernandes | CB | (Guinea-Bissau) | Bissau | 7 March 2000 (age 26) | Nottingham Forest | 8 August 2022 | Free | 30 June 2024 |
| 16 | Joe Gubbins | CB | (England) | Oxford | 3 August 2001 (age 25) | Queens Park Rangers | 25 August 2023 | Loan | 31 May 2024 |
| 23 | Bailey Sloane | LB | (England) | Bury | 6 February 2003 (age 23) | Clitheroe | 1 September 2022 | Undisclosed | 30 June 2024 |
| 25 | Aaron Pickles | CB | (England) | | 20 March 2005 (age 21) | Academy | 20 July 2023 | Trainee | 30 June 2024 |
| 38 | Connor O'Brien | LB | (England) | Accrington | 15 February 2005 (age 21) | Academy | 1 July 2023 | Trainee | 30 June 2024 |
Midfielders
| 6 | Liam Coyle | DM | (Northern Ireland) | (England) Liverpool | 6 December 1999 (age 26) | Liverpool | 5 July 2021 | Free | 30 June 2024 |
| 8 | Ben Woods | CM | (England) | Wigan | 27 September 2002 (age 24) | (Scotland) Inverness Caledonian Thistle | 1 September 2023 | Free | 30 June 2024 |
| 10 | Joe Pritchard | CM | (England) | Watford | 10 September 1996 (age 30) | Bolton Wanderers | 1 July 2019 | Free | 30 June 2024 |
| 11 | Sean McConville | LM | (England) | Liverpool | 6 March 1989 (age 37) | Chester | 1 July 2015 | Free | 30 June 2024 |
| 12 | Seb Quirk | RM | (England) | Liverpool | 5 December 2001 (age 24) | Everton | 19 January 2023 | Undisclosed | 30 June 2025 |
| 18 | Tommy Leigh | CM | (England) | Portsmouth | 13 April 2000 (age 26) | Bognor Regis Town | 10 July 2021 | Undisclosed | 30 June 2024 |
| 20 | Oliver Patrick | CM | (England) | Oldham | 2 February 2003 (age 23) | Rochdale | 9 July 2021 | Free | 30 June 2024 |
| 22 | Dan Martin | CM | (England) | | 19 April 2002 (age 24) | Academy | 10 September 2020 | Trainee | 30 June 2024 |
| 27 | Lewis Trickett | RM | (Northern Ireland) | (England) Accrington | 27 April 2005 (age 21) | Academy | 20 July 2023 | Trainee | 30 June 2024 |
| 28 | Seamus Conneely | DM | (Republic of Ireland) | (England) Lambeth | 9 July 1988 (age 38) | (Republic of Ireland) Sligo Rovers | 1 January 2015 | Free | 30 June 2024 |
| 30 | Alex Henderson | CM | (England) | | 25 September 2004 (age 22) | Academy | 20 July 2023 | Trainee | 30 June 2024 |
Forwards
| 7 | Shaun Whalley | RW | (England) | Prescot | 7 August 1987 (age 39) | Shrewsbury Town | 4 July 2022 | Free | 30 June 2024 |
| 9 | Matt Lowe | CF | (England) | Warwick | 11 March 1996 (age 30) | Brackley Town | 1 July 2022 | Free | 30 June 2024 |
| 17 | Jack Nolan | LW | (England) | Portsmouth | 25 May 2001 (age 25) | Walsall | 5 August 2021 | Free | 30 June 2024 |
| 19 | Jake Bickerstaff | CF | (Wales) | (England) Liverpool | 11 September 2001 (age 25) | (Wales) Wrexham | 1 February 2024 | Loan | 31 May 2024 |
| 26 | Leslie Adekoya | CF | (Republic of Ireland) | Dublin | 18 April 2004 (age 22) | Academy | 26 July 2022 | Trainee | 30 June 2024 |
| 33 | Angola Popoola | CF | (England) | | 19 June 2007 (age 19) | Academy | 8 August 2023 | Trainee | 30 June 2024 |
| 39 | Josh Woods | CF | (England) | | 5 July 2000 (age 26) | Clay Brow | 30 July 2021 | Free | 30 June 2024 |
| 55 | Korede Adedoyin | RW | (Nigeria) | Lagos | 14 November 2000 (age 25) | Sheffield Wednesday | 31 January 2022 | Undisclosed | 30 June 2024 |
Out on Loan
| 24 | Emerich Poilly | DM | (France) | | 26 February 2005 (age 21) | Stoke City | 1 July 2021 | Free | 30 June 2024 |
| 32 | Jack Massey | LW | (England) | | 15 April 2005 (age 21) | Academy | 20 July 2023 | Trainee | 30 June 2024 |

== Transfers ==
=== In ===
| Date | Pos | Player | Transferred from | Fee | Ref |
|---|---|---|---|---|---|
| 21 July 2023 | RB | (England) Kelvin Mellor | (England) Crewe Alexandra | Free Transfer | |
| 11 August 2023 | GK | (England) Jack McIntyre | (England) Radcliffe | Free Transfer | |
| 1 September 2023 | CM | (England) Ben Woods | (Scotland) Inverness Caledonian Thistle | Free Transfer | |

=== Out ===
| Date | Pos | Player | Transferred to | Fee | Ref |
|---|---|---|---|---|---|
| 26 June 2023 | CM | (Liberia) Mo Sangare | (Scotland) Livingston | Undisclosed | |
| 30 June 2023 | RB | (Wales) Mitch Clark | (England) Port Vale | Released | |
| 30 June 2023 | GK | (England) Max Clayton | Free agent | Released | |
| 30 June 2023 | RM | (England) Rhys-James Fenlon | (England) Chorley | Released | |
| 30 June 2023 | DM | (England) Brandon Gough | (England) Colne | Released | |
| 30 June 2023 | CF | (England) Joe Hardy | (England) Bootle | Released | |
| 30 June 2023 | CF | (England) Calvin Harper | (England) Hyde United | Released | |
| 30 June 2023 | CF | (Spain) Enock Lusiama | (England) Atherton Collieries | Released | |
| 30 June 2023 | CB | (England) Harvey Monk | (England) Clitheroe | Released | |
| 30 June 2023 | CM | (England) Dylan Moonan | (England) Atherton Collieries | Released | |
| 30 June 2023 | CM | (France) Anthony Mancini | (England) Hartlepool United | Released | |
| 30 June 2023 | RB | (England) Jasper Newton | (United States) West Liberty Hilltoppers | Released | |
| 30 June 2023 | CB | (Saint Kitts and Nevis) Michael Nottingham | (Scotland) Livingston | End of Contract | |
| 30 June 2023 | CB | (England) Harvey Rodgers | (England) Grimsby Town | Free Transfer | |
| 5 July 2023 | CF | (Spain) Alhagi Touray Sisay | (Spain) UE Vilassar de Mar | Mutual Consent | |
| 31 July 2023 | CM | (Northern Ireland) David Morgan | (England) Southport | Released | |
| 1 August 2023 | CM | (Scotland) Ethan Hamilton | (England) Lincoln City | Undisclosed | |
| 5 January 2024 | RM | (England) Owen Devonport | (England) Fleetwood Town | Released | |

=== Loaned in ===
| Date | Pos | Player | Loaned from | Until | Ref |
|---|---|---|---|---|---|
| 17 July 2023 | CB | (England) Brad Hills | (England) Norwich City | End of Season | |
| 22 July 2023 | CF | (England) Josh Andrews | (England) Birmingham City | 1 February 2024 (Note: On 1 February, Andrews was recalled back early to Birmingham.) | |
| 22 July 2023 | CB | (England) Lewis Shipley | (England) Norwich City | End of Season | |
| 25 August 2023 | CB | (England) Joe Gubbins | (England) Queens Park Rangers | End of Season | |
| 29 September 2023 | GK | (Scotland) Jon McCracken | (England) Norwich City | 14 October 2023 (Note: On 6 October, McCracken's loan from Norwich was extended by a further week.) | |
| 7 December 2023 | GK | (England) Joe Walsh | (England) Queens Park Rangers | 22 December 2023 (Note: On 15 December, Walsh's loan from QPR was extended by a further week.) | |
| 25 January 2024 | GK | (Czech Republic) Radek Vítek | (England) Manchester United | End of Season | |
| 1 February 2024 | CF | (Wales) Jake Bickerstaff | (Wales) Wrexham | End of Season | |

=== Loaned out ===
| Date | Pos | Player | Loaned to | Until | Ref |
|---|---|---|---|---|---|
| 10 August 2023 | CM | (England) Alex Henderson | (England) Clitheroe | 4 October 2023 (Note: On September 6, Henderson's loan at Clitheroe was extended by a further month.) | |
| 12 August 2023 | GK | (England) Jack McIntyre | (England) Dartford | 9 September 2023 | |
| 8 September 2023 | CM | (England) Owen Devonport | (England) Clitheroe | 6 October 2023 | |
| 23 September 2023 | CF | (England) Jack Massey | (England) Stafford Rangers | 21 October 2023 | |
| 6 October 2023 | CM | (England) Oliver Patrick | (England) Atherton Collieries | 4 November 2023 | |
| 7 December 2023 | CF | (England) Jack Massey | (England) Widnes | 4 January 2024 | |
| 5 January 2024 | CF | (England) Jack Massey | (England) Clitheroe | End of Season (Note: On 7 February, Massey's loan at Clitheroe was extended until the end of season.) | |
| 19 January 2024 | CM | (England) Will Procter | (England) Nelson | 17 February 2024 | |
| 15 February 2024 | DM | (France) Emerich Poilly | (England) Clitheroe | 14 March 2024 | |
| 16 March 2024 | CB | (England) Bradley Kelly | (England) Colne | 13 April 2024 | |
| 16 March 2024 | CB | (England) Josh Smith | (England) Newcastle Town | 13 April 2024 | |
| 23 March 2024 | CB | (England) Jake Young | (England) Bradford (Park Avenue) | 30 April 2024 | |
| 27 March 2024 | CM | (England) Will Procter | (England) Barnoldswick Town | 30 April 2024 | |
| 28 March 2024 | CF | (England) Harley Lawton | (England) Bradford (Park Avenue) | 30 April 2024 | |

== Pre-season and friendlies ==
On 26 May, Accrington Stanley announced their first two pre-season friendlies, against Blackburn Rovers and Cliterhoe. Four days later, a trip to face Warrington Town was confirmed. On 9 June, a fourth friendly was confirmed, against Chesterfield. Ten days later, a fifth friendly was booked, against York City.

Win Draw Loss Fixtures

| 8 July 2023 Friendly | Accrington Stanley | 2–2 | Blackburn Rovers | Accrington |
| 15:00 BST | Nolan 64'; Adedoyin 102' (pen.) | | Hedges 104'; Dolan 113' | Stadium: Crown Ground |
Note: Two 60-minute halves

| 11 July 2023 Friendly | Warrington Town | 2–3 | Accrington Stanley | Warrington |
| 19:45 BST | Duffy 11'; Woods 15' | | Trialist x3 | Stadium: Cantilever Park |

| 16 July 2023 Friendly | Accrington Stanley | 3–1 | Clitheroe | Accrington |
| 15:00 BST | Nolan 62'; Devonport 79'; Sloane 84' | | Gonzales 21' | Stadium: Crown Ground |

| 22 July 2023 Friendly | Accrington Stanley | 2–3 | Chesterfield | Accrington |
| 15:00 BST | Nolan 28'; Trialist 67' | | Banks 9'; Dobra 20'; Colclough 25' | Stadium: Crown Ground |

| 29 July 2023 Friendly | Accrington Stanley | 2–0 | York City | Accrington |
| 15:00 BST | Adedoyin 61'; Woods 81' | | | Stadium: Crown Ground |

== Competitions ==
=== Overall record ===
| Competition | First match | Last match | Starting round | Final position | Record | | | | | | | |
| Competition | First match | Last match | Starting round | Final position | Pld | W | D | L | GF | GA | GD | Win % |
|---|---|---|---|---|---|---|---|---|---|---|---|---|
| League Two | 5 August 2023 | 27 April 2024 | Matchday 1 | 17th | 46 | 16 | 9 | 21 | 63 | 71 | −8 | 34.78 |
| FA Cup | 4 November 2023 | 14 November 2023 | First round | First round | 2 | 0 | 1 | 1 | 3 | 4 | −1 | 0.00 |
| EFL Cup | 8 August 2023 | 8 August 2023 | First round | First round | 1 | 0 | 1 | 0 | 1 | 1 | +0 | 0.00 |
| EFL Trophy | 5 September 2023 | 10 January 2024 | Group stage | Third round | 5 | 3 | 0 | 2 | 9 | 8 | +1 | 60.00 |
| Total | | | | | 54 | 19 | 11 | 24 | 76 | 84 | −8 | 35.19 |

Last updated: 29 April 2024
Source: Soccerway

=== League Two ===
==== League table ====
| Pos | Team | Pld | W | D | L | GF | GA | GD | Pts |
|---|---|---|---|---|---|---|---|---|---|
| 14 | Notts County | 46 | 18 | 7 | 21 | 89 | 86 | +3 | 61 |
| 15 | Morecambe | 46 | 17 | 10 | 19 | 67 | 81 | −14 | 58 (Note: On 11 April 2024, Morecambe were deducted three points for failing to pay players and staff on time following previous EFL rules breaches in the 2023–24 season.) |
| 16 | Tranmere Rovers | 46 | 17 | 6 | 23 | 67 | 70 | −3 | 57 |
| 17 | Accrington Stanley | 46 | 16 | 9 | 21 | 63 | 71 | −8 | 57 |
| 18 | Newport County | 46 | 16 | 7 | 23 | 62 | 76 | −14 | 55 |
| 19 | Swindon Town | 46 | 14 | 12 | 20 | 77 | 83 | −6 | 54 |
| 20 | Salford City | 46 | 13 | 12 | 21 | 66 | 82 | −16 | 51 |

Source: EFL Official Website
Rules for classification: 1) Points; 2) Goal difference; 3) Number of goals scored; 4) Head-to-head results; 5) Wins; 6) Away goals; 7) Penalty points (sec 9.5); 8) 12-point sending off offences

==== Results summary ====
| Overall | | | | | | | | Home | | | | | | Away | | | | | |
| Pld | W | D | L | GF | GA | GD | Pts | W | D | L | GF | GA | GD | W | D | L | GF | GA | GD |
|---|---|---|---|---|---|---|---|---|---|---|---|---|---|---|---|---|---|---|---|
| 46 | 16 | 9 | 21 | 63 | 71 | −8 | 57 | 10 | 5 | 8 | 34 | 27 | +7 | 6 | 4 | 13 | 29 | 44 | −15 |

Last updated: 27 April 2024.
Source: Soccerway

==== Results by round ====
| Round | 1 | 2 | 3 | 4 | 5 | 6 | 7 | 8 | 9 | 10 | 11 | 12 | 13 | 14 | 15 | 16 | 17 | 18 | 19 | 20 | 21 | 22 | 23 | 24 | 25 | 26 | 28 | 30 | 31 | 32 | 33 | 34 | 35 | 29^{2} | 36 | 37 | 38 | 39 | 40 | 41 | 43 | 27^{1} | 44 | 42^{3} | 45 | 46 |
|---|---|---|---|---|---|---|---|---|---|---|---|---|---|---|---|---|---|---|---|---|---|---|---|---|---|---|---|---|---|---|---|---|---|---|---|---|---|---|---|---|---|---|---|---|---|---|
| Ground | H | A | H | H | A | A | H | H | A | H | A | H | A | H | A | H | A | H | A | H | H | A | H | A | A | H | H | A | H | A | H | A | H | A | A | H | A | H | A | H | H | A | A | A | A | H |
| Result | W | L | D | W | W | L | L | W | L | L | D | W | W | W | W | L | L | W | L | L | D | D | W | L | D | W | L | W | D | L | W | D | L | L | L | L | W | D | L | L | D | W | L | L | L | W |
| Position | 2 | 8 | 8 | 4 | 3 | 8 | 15 | 8 | 12 | 15 | 15 | 11 | 9 | 7 | 6 | 7 | 8 | 7 | 7 | 9 | 10 | 9 | 9 | 9 | 9 | 9 | 12 | 11 | 11 | 12 | 12 | 12 | 16 | 16 | 16 | 16 | 15 | 16 | 16 | 18 | 18 | 17 | 18 | 18 | 18 | 17 |
| Points | 3 | 3 | 4 | 7 | 10 | 10 | 10 | 13 | 13 | 13 | 14 | 17 | 20 | 23 | 26 | 26 | 26 | 29 | 29 | 29 | 30 | 31 | 34 | 34 | 35 | 38 | 38 | 41 | 42 | 42 | 45 | 46 | 46 | 46 | 46 | 46 | 49 | 50 | 50 | 50 | 51 | 54 | 54 | 54 | 54 | 57 |

Updated to match(es) played on 20 April 2024. Source: Soccerway
A = Away; H = Home; W = Win; D = Draw; L = Loss; P = Postponed
Notes:
- ^{1} Matchday 27 (vs Newport County) was postponed due to Newport's FA Cup involvement.
- ^{2} Matchday 29 (vs Walsall) was postponed due to a unplayable playing surface.
- ^{3} Matchday 42 (vs Mansfield Town) was postponed due to a unplayable playing surface.

==== Matches ====
On 22 June, the EFL League Two fixtures were released.

Win Draw Loss Fixtures

===== August =====
| 5 August 2023 1 | Accrington Stanley | 3–0 | Newport County | Accrington |
| 15:00 BST | Nolan 24'; Shipley (yellow card) 37'; Leigh (yellow card) 39'; Whalley 80'; Adedoyin 90+4' | Report | | Stadium: Crown Ground; Attendance: 2,416; Referee: Martin Woods |

| 12 August 2023 2 | Gillingham | 1–0 | Accrington Stanley | Gillingham |
| 15:00 BST | Jefferies (yellow card) 5'; Nadesan 29'; Ogie (yellow card) 58'; Ehmer (yellow card) 90' | Report | Andrews (yellow card) 26'; Rich-Baghuelou (yellow card) 62' | Stadium: Priestfield Stadium; Attendance: 6,489; Referee: Will Finnie |

| 15 August 2023 3 | Accrington Stanley | 1–1 | Barrow | Accrington |
| 19:45 BST | McConville 36'; Hills (yellow card) 71'; Adedoyin (yellow card) 83' | Report | Spence (yellow card) 51'; Acquah 87' | Stadium: Crown Ground; Attendance: 2,204; Referee: Andrew Kitchen |

| 19 August 2023 4 | Accrington Stanley | 2–1 | Harrogate Town | Accrington |
| 15:00 BST | Rich-Baghuelou (yellow card) 3'; McConville 28', (yellow card) 46'; Quirk (yellow card) 71' (yellow-red card) 82'; Coyle (yellow card) 87'; Conneely (yellow card) 90+7'; Nolan 90+8' | Report | Folarin (yellow card) 27'; Daly (yellow card) 34'; Mattock (yellow card) 45'; Burrell 83'; Falkingham (yellow card) 90+5' | Stadium: Crown Ground; Attendance: 1,950; Referee: Scott Simpson |

| 26 August 2023 5 | Salford City | 1–2 | Accrington Stanley | Salford |
| 15:00 BST | Garbutt (yellow card) 20'; Tilt (yellow card) 39'; Watson 88' (pen.); Hendry (yellow card) 89' | Report | Whalley 24'; Andrews (yellow card) 35', (goal) 45'; Rich-Baghuelou (yellow card) 38'; Conneely (yellow card) 87' | Stadium: Moor Lane; Attendance: 2,520; Referee: Charles Breakspear |

===== September =====
| 2 September 2023 6 | Notts County | 3–1 | Accrington Stanley | Nottingham |
| 15:00 BST | Crowley 7'; Jones (yellow card) 22'; Nemane (yellow card) 61'; Langstaff 65', 90'; Adebayo-Rowling (yellow card) 90+5'; Brindley (yellow card) 90+5' | Report | Andrews 27'; Leigh (yellow card) 74'; Conneely (yellow card) 86' | Stadium: Meadow Lane; Attendance: 9,846; Referee: Thomas Krik |

| 9 September 2023 7 | Accrington Stanley | 0–3 | Mansfield Town | Accrington |
| 15:00 BST | Rich-Baghuelou (yellow card) 6' | | Keillor-Dunn 29'; Maris 36', (yellow card) 47'; Lewis 75' | Stadium: Crown Ground |

| 16 September 2023 8 | Accrington Stanley | 4–1 | Sutton United | Accrington |
| 15:00 BST | Andrews (yellow card) 10'; Leigh 45+1' (pen.), 57'; Longelo (yellow card) 49', (goal) 63'; Savin (yellow card) 90'; Pritchard 90+5' | Report | Bouzanis (yellow card) 45'; Patrick 64' | Stadium: Crown Ground; Attendance: 2,036; Referee: Darren Drysdale |

| 23 September 2023 9 | Tranmere Rovers | 2–0 | Accrington Stanley | Birkenhead |
| 15:00 BST | Hawkes 14' (pen.), 49' | Report | Savin (yellow card) 14'; Rich-Baghuelou (red card) 42'; Leigh (yellow card) 79'; Hills (yellow card) 90+4' | Stadium: Prenton Park; Attendance: 5,980; Referee: Sam Purkiss |

| 30 September 2023 10 | Accrington Stanley | 1–3 | Stockport County | Accrington |
| 15:00 BST | Pritchard (yellow card) 61'; Nolan 86' | Report | Olaofe 12'; Collar 16'; Bailey (yellow card) 43'; Barry 59' (pen.) | Stadium: Crown Ground; Attendance: 3,913; Referee: Tom Reeves |

===== October =====
| 3 October 2023 11 | Morecambe | 1–1 | Accrington Stanley | Morecambe |
| 19:45 BST | Bloxham (yellow card) 61'; Connolly 64'; Senior (yellow card) 72'; Bedeau (yellow card) 87' | Report | Andrews (yellow card) 61'; Hills (yellow card) 63'; Whalley (yellow card) 65'; Leigh 70' (pen.) | Stadium: Mazuma Stadium; Attendance: 3,458; Referee: Keith Stroud |

| 7 October 2023 12 | Accrington Stanley | 2–1 | Forest Green Rovers | Accrington |
| 15:00 BST | Andrews 18', 51'; Hills (yellow card) 62' | Report | Welch (yellow card) 58'; Stevens 83' | Stadium: Crown Ground; Attendance: 2,222; Referee: Ben Atkinson |

| 14 October 2023 13 | Grimsby Town | 0–2 | Accrington Stanley | Cleethorpes |
| 15:00 BST | Waterfall (yellow card) 17' (yellow-red card) 72' | Report | Leigh (yellow card) 51'; Martin (yellow card) 66'; Whalley 74'; Andrews 82' | Stadium: Blundell Park; Attendance: 6,335; Referee: Lewis Smith |

| 21 October 2023 14 | Accrington Stanley | 1–0 | Milton Keynes Dons | Accrington |
| 15:00 GMT | Whalley 31', (yellow card) 61'; Woods (yellow card) 41' | Report | Harvie (yellow card) 56' | Stadium: Crown Ground; Attendance: 1,995; Referee: Simon Mather |

| 24 October 2023 15 | AFC Wimbledon | 2–4 | Accrington Stanley | Wimbledon |
| 14:45 BST | Pell (yellow card) 24'; Bugiel 51', 70'; Al-Hamadi (yellow card) 68'; Biler (yellow card) 82' | Report | Pritchard 4', 46'; Leigh 9'; Rich-Baghuelou (yellow card) 25'; Hills (yellow card) 54', (goal) 83'; Mellor (yellow card) 63' | Stadium: Plough Lane; Attendance: 7,108; Referee: Carl Brook |

| 28 October 2023 16 | Accrington Stanley | 0–1 | Colchester United | Accrington |
| 15:00 BST | Leigh (yellow card) 54' | Report | Taylor 57'; Greenidge (yellow card) 59'; Read (yellow card) 71'; Hopper (yellow card) 75' | Stadium: Crown Ground; Attendance: 2,107; Referee: Adam Herczeg |

===== November =====
| 11 November 2023 17 | Crawley Town | 3–1 | Accrington Stanley | Crawley |
| 15:00 GMT | Orsi 8', 76' (pen.); Wright 48'; Lolos (yellow card) 52'; Williams (yellow card) 85' | Report | Nolan 2'; Adedoyin (yellow card) 20'; Martin (yellow card) 50'; Hills (red card) 74'; Woods (yellow card) 85'; Pritchard (yellow card) 87' | Stadium: Broadfield Stadium; Attendance: 2,887; Referee: David Rock |

| 18 November 2023 18 | Accrington Stanley | 2–0 | Wrexham | Accrington |
| 15:00 GMT | Adedoyin (yellow card) 28'; Leigh 50' (pen.); Longelo 73' | Report | Mullin (penalty missed) 90+10' | Stadium: Crown Ground; Attendance: 5,261; Referee: Neil Hair |

| 25 November 2023 19 | Bradford City | 1–0 | Accrington Stanley | Bradford |
| 15:00 GMT | Smith 58' (yellow card) 66'; Taylor (yellow card) 80'; Chapman (yellow card) 90+5' | Report | Hills (yellow card) 32'; Rich-Baghuelou (yellow card) 47'; Shipley (yellow card) 57'; Whalley (yellow card) 76' | Stadium: Valley Parade; Attendance: 548; Referee: Keith Stroud |

| 28 November 2023 20 | Accrington Stanley | 3–4 | Swindon Town | Accrington |
| 19:45 GMT | Baghuelou (yellow card) 6'; McCracken (yellow card) 17'; Conneely (yellow card) 18'; Hills (yellow card) 29' (goal) 90+7', 90+10'; Longelo (yellow card) 33'; Leigh (penalty missed) 69'; Lowe (yellow card) 87'; Adedoyin 90+2' | Report | Kemp 17' (pen.) (yellow card) 25'; Young 31' (yellow card) 49'; Khan 60'; Austin 89' | Stadium: Crown Ground; Attendance: 1,997; Referee: Seb Stockbridge |

===== December =====
| 9 December 2023 21 | Accrington Stanley | 0–0 | Doncaster Rovers | Accrington |
| 15:00 GMT | Shipley (yellow card) 55'; Conneely (yellow card) 64' | Report | | Stadium: Crown Ground; Attendance: 2,501; Referee: Peter Wright |

| 16 December 2023 22 | Crewe Alexandra | 3–3 | Accrington Stanley | Crewe |
| 15:00 GMT | Rowe 4'; Demetriou 29'; Tracey (yellow card) 45'; Thomas (yellow card) 51'; Offord (red card) 80'; Nevitt 90+8' (yellow card) 90+9' | Report | Nolan 6'; Martin (yellow card) 71'; B. Woods 87'; J. Woods 90+6'; Hills (yellow card) 90+9' | Stadium: Gresty Road; Attendance: 4,012; Referee: Paul Howard |

| 23 December 2023 23 | Accrington Stanley | 2–1 | Walsall | Accrington |
| 15:00 GMT | Leigh 9'; Woods (yellow card) 45+3'; Pritchard 57' | | Draper 45+4' (pen.) | Stadium: Crown Ground; Attendance: 2,386; Referee: Scott Oldham |

| 26 December 2023 24 | Harrogate Town | 2–1 | Accrington Stanley | Harrogate |
| 15:00 GMT | Muldoon 63'; Thomson 90+3' | Report | Nolan 57' | Stadium: Wetherby Road; Attendance: 5,515; Referee: Ben Speedie |

| 29 December 2023 25 | Barrow | 1–1 | Accrington Stanley | Barrow-in-Furness |
| 19:45 GMT | Whitfield 52' | Report | Whalley (yellow card) 2'; Martin (yellow card) 44'; Gubbins (yellow card) 47'; B. Woods (yellow card) 61'; Pritchard 71'; Shipley (yellow card) 87'; J. Woods (yellow card) 90+2' | Stadium: Holker Street; Attendance: 3,549; Referee: Simon Mather |

===== January =====
| 1 January 2024 26 | Accrington Stanley | 3–0 | Salford City | Accrington |
| 15:00 GMT | Whalley 14'; Gubbins (yellow card) 17'; Nolan 33' (pen.), 40'; Martin (yellow card) 45+3'; J. Woods (yellow card) 67'; B. Woods (yellow card) 86' | Report | Bolton (yellow card) 64'; Tilt (yellow card) 67' | Stadium: Crown Ground; Attendance: 2,735; Referee: Matthew Corlett |

| 13 January 2024 28 | Accrington Stanley | 1–2 | Gillingham | Accrington |
| 15:00 GMT | Gubbins (yellow card) 44'; Shipley (yellow card) 45+1'; Henderson 50' | Report | Masterson 62'; Bonne 75'; Malone (yellow card) 82' | Stadium: Crown Ground; Attendance: 2,383; Referee: Daniel Middleton |

| 27 January 2024 30 | Forest Green Rovers | 0–1 | Accrington Stanley | Nailsworth |
| 15:00 GMT | Inniss (yellow card) 20' | Report | Nolan 22' (pen.); Hills (yellow card) 42'; Martin (yellow card) 45+2'; Rich-Baghuelou (yellow card) 59'; Woods (yellow card) 80'; Conneely (yellow card) 87' | Stadium: The New Lawn; Attendance: 2,238; Referee: Adam Herczeg |

===== February =====
| 3 February 2024 31 | Accrington Stanley | 0–0 | Grimsby Town | Accrington |
| 15:00 GMT | Woods (yellow card) 49' | Report | Hume (yellow card) 79' | Stadium: Crown Ground; Attendance: 8,745; Referee: David Rock |

| 10 February 2024 32 | Milton Keynes Dons | 2–1 | Accrington Stanley | Denbigh |
| 15:00 GMT | Payne 71' (yellow card) 77'; Tomlinson 90+3' | Report | Nolan 11' (yellow card) 90'; Gubbins (yellow card) 29'; Martin (yellow card) 34'; Conneely (yellow card) 58'; Woods (yellow card) 65'; O'Brien (yellow card) 79' | Stadium: Stadium MK; Attendance: 5,508; Referee: Declan Bourne |

| 13 February 2024 33 | Accrington Stanley | 2–0 | AFC Wimbledon | Accrington |
| 19:45 GMT | Nolan 50'; Woods 81'; Bickerstaff (yellow card) 90+5' | Report | Ball (yellow card) 36' | Stadium: Crown Ground; Attendance: 2,032; Referee: Edward Duckworth |

| 17 February 2024 34 | Colchester United | 1–1 | Accrington Stanley | Colchester |
| 15:00 GMT | Iandolo (yellow card) 27'; Chilvers 40'; Harbottle (yellow card) 77'; Edwards (yellow card) 90+4' | Report | Mellor (yellow card) 21'; Hills (red card) 46'; Harbottle 80' (o.g.) | Stadium: Colchester Community Stadium; Attendance: 3,436; Referee: Jeremy Simpson |

| 24 February 2024 35 | Accrington Stanley | 0–1 | Crawley Town | Accrington |
| 15:00 GMT | Leigh (yellow card) 41'; O'Brien (yellow card) 81' | Report | Kelly (yellow card) 33'; Ransom 68'; Addai (yellow card) 90+2' | Stadium: Crown Ground; Attendance: 2,216; Referee: Marc Edwards |

| 27 February 2024 29 | Walsall | 2–1 | Accrington Stanley | Bescot |
| 19:45 GMT | Okagbue 60'; Adegboyega 85'; L. Gordon (yellow card) 90+6'; Faal (yellow card) 90+7' | Report | Martin (yellow card) 22'; Nolan 56' (pen.) (yellow card) 87' | Stadium: Bescot Stadium; Attendance: 5,013; Referee: Farai Hallam |
Note: Fixture was originally scheduled for 20 January, but was postponed due to a unplayable playing surface.

===== March =====
| 2 March 2024 36 | Wrexham | 4–0 | Accrington Stanley | Wrexham |
| 15:00 GMT | Mullin 17', 25', 35'; Lee 41'; McClean (yellow card) 75' | Report | Woods (yellow card) 47'; Shipley (red card) 90+1' | Stadium: Racecourse Ground; Attendance: 12,209; Referee: Ben Atkinson |

| 9 March 2024 37 | Accrington Stanley | 0–3 | Bradford City | Accrington |
| 15:00 GMT | O'Brien (yellow card) 79' | Report | Wright (yellow card) 5' (goal) 12', 23'; Cook 38' | Stadium: Crown Ground; Attendance: 4,099; Referee: Paul Howard |

| 12 March 2024 38 | Swindon Town | 1–2 | Accrington Stanley | Swindon |
| 19:45 GMT | McEachran (yellow card) 30'; Drinan 47' | Report | Leigh (yellow card) 14'; Nolan 57' (pen.); Henderson 82'; Mellor (yellow card) 90' | Stadium: The County Ground; Attendance: 6,085; Referee: Thomas Parsons |

| 16 March 2024 39 | Accrington Stanley | 2–2 | Notts County | Accrington |
| 15:00 GMT | Whalley 17'; O'Brien (yellow card) 46'; Nolan 79' (pen.); Hills (yellow card) 90+6' | Report | O'Brien 4'; Jatta 45'; Baldwin (yellow card) 70' | Stadium: Crown Ground; Attendance: 2,499; Referee: Sunny Singh Gill |

| 23 March 2024 40 | Sutton United | 3–1 | Accrington Stanley | Sutton |
| 15:00 GMT | Smith 16', (yellow card) 32'; Sowunmi 68'; Adom-Malaki 74' | Report | Bickerstaff 85'; Adedoyin (yellow card) 90+1' | Stadium: Gander Green Lane; Attendance: 3,265; Referee: Tom Nield |

| 29 March 2024 41 | Accrington Stanley | 1–2 | Morecambe | Accrington |
| 15:00 GMT | Gubbins (yellow card) 60'; Leigh (yellow card) 72'; Shipley 89', (yellow card) 89'; O'Brien (yellow card) 90+9' | Report | Khumbeni (yellow card) 47', (goal) 55'; Stokes 62'; Tutonda (yellow card) 90+4' | Stadium: Crown Ground; Attendance: 3,420; Referee: Alex Chilowicz |

===== April =====
| 6 April 2024 43 | Accrington Stanley | 0–0 | Crewe Alexandra | Accrington |
| 15:00 BST | Henderson (yellow card) 11'; Martin (yellow card) 57' | Report | Nevitt (yellow card) 90+1' | Stadium: Crown Ground; Attendance: 2,658; Referee: Adam Herczeg |

| 9 April 2024 27 | Newport County | 1–3 | Accrington Stanley | Newport |
| 19:45 BST | Morris 13'; Bondswell (yellow card) 45'; Lewis (red card) 90+6'; Jameson (yellow card) 90+8' | Report | Henderson 22'; Leigh 46'; Pritchard 67' | Stadium: Rodney Parade; Attendance: 3,201; Referee: Darren Drysdale |
Note: Fixture was originally scheduled for 6 January, but was postponed due to Newport's FA Cup involvement.

| 13 April 2024 44 | Doncaster Rovers | 4–0 | Accrington Stanley | Doncaster |
| 15:00 BST | Adelakun 6'; Ironside 21'; Maxwell 60', (yellow card) 78'; Bailey 71' | Report | Whalley (yellow card) 29'; Pritchard (yellow card) 90+7' | Stadium: Eco-Power Stadium; Attendance: 6,990; Referee: Ross Joyce |

| 16 April 2024 42 | Mansfield Town | 2–1 | Accrington Stanley | Mansfield |
| 19:45 BST | Maris 2'; Quinn 63' | Report | Hills (yellow card) 35'; Coyle (yellow card) 53'; Leigh 85' | Stadium: Field Mill; Attendance: 7,942; Referee: Charles Breakspear |
Note: Fixture was originally scheduled for 1 April, but was postponed due to a unplayable playing surface.

| 20 April 2024 45 | Stockport County | 4–2 | Accrington Stanley | Edgeley |
| 15:00 BST | Wootton 9', 62'; Knoyle (yellow card) 27'; Lemonheigh-Evans 44'; Barry (yellow card) 44'; Sarcevic 79' | Report | Whalley 17'; Conneely (yellow card) 56'; Nolan 77'; Hills (yellow card) 80'; Shipley (yellow card) 87' | Stadium: Edgeley Park; Attendance: 10,180; Referee: Simon Mather |

| 27 April 2024 46 | Accrington Stanley | 4–1 | Tranmere Rovers | Accrington |
| 15:00 BST | Shipley 4'; Nolan 51' (pen.), 82' (pen.); Henderson 53' | | Norris 2' | Stadium: Crown Ground; Referee: Martin Woods |

=== FA Cup ===
Accrington were drawn away to Doncaster Rovers in the first round.

Win Draw Loss Fixtures

| 4 November 2023 First round | Doncaster Rovers | 2–2 | Accrington Stanley | Doncaster |
| 15:00 GMT | Faal 8'; Anderson (yellow card) 45+1'; Nixon (yellow card) 52'; Biggins 81' | Report | Woods (yellow card) 27'; Hills (yellow card) 29'; Whalley 74'; Conneely 84'; Leigh (yellow card) 90+1' | Stadium: Eco-Power Stadium; Attendance: 3,226; Referee: Alan Young |

| 14 November 2023 First round replay | Accrington Stanley | 1–2 (a.e.t.) | Doncaster Rovers | Accrington |
| 19:45 GMT | Pritchard 7'; Gubbins (yellow card) 13'; Conneely (yellow card) 62'; J. Woods (yellow card) 90'; Shipley (yellow card) 110'; B. Woods (yellow card) 115' | Report | Faal (yellow card) 11'; Westbrooke 67'; Ironside 101' | Stadium: Crown Ground; Attendance: 1,136; Referee: Scott Tallis |

=== EFL Cup ===
Stanley were drawn at home to Bradford City in the first round.

Win Draw Loss Fixtures

| 8 August 2023 First round | Accrington Stanley | 1–1 (1–4 p) | Bradford City | Accrington |
| 19:45 BST | Coyle (yellow card) 32'; Whalley (yellow card) 39'; Andrews 66'; Hills (yellow card) 87' | Report | Pattison 45+1'; Halliday (yellow card) 60'; Stubbs (yellow card) 86' | Stadium: Crown Ground; Attendance: 2,368; Referee: Martin Coy |
| | Penalties |
| | Leigh (penalty scored); Nolan (penalty missed); Adedoyin (penalty missed) | | (penalty scored) Cook; (penalty scored) Gilliead; (penalty scored) Walker; (penalty scored) Oduor |

=== EFL Trophy ===
In the group stage, Accrington were drawn into Northern Group C alongside Carlisle United, Harrogate Town and Nottingham Forest U21. After topping their group, they were drawn at home to Lincoln City in the second round and to Bolton Wanderers in the third round.

| Pos | Div | Team | Pld | W | PW | PL | L | GF | GA | GD | Pts | Qualification |
|---|---|---|---|---|---|---|---|---|---|---|---|---|
| 1 | L2 | Accrington Stanley | 3 | 2 | 0 | 0 | 1 | 7 | 5 | +2 | 6 | Advance to Round 2 |
| 2 | ACA | Nottingham Forest U21 | 3 | 2 | 0 | 0 | 1 | 5 | 3 | +2 | 6 | Advance to Round 2 |
| 3 | L1 | Carlisle United | 3 | 1 | 0 | 0 | 2 | 2 | 3 | −1 | 3 | |
| 4 | L2 | Harrogate Town | 3 | 1 | 0 | 0 | 2 | 5 | 8 | −3 | 3 | |

Updated to match(es) played on 14 November 2023. Source: EFL.com

Win Draw Loss Fixtures

| 5 September 2023 Group stage | Accrington Stanley | 1–0 | Carlisle United | Accrington |
| 19:45 BST | Hills (yellow card) 36'; Coyle (yellow card) 52'; Martin (yellow card) 79'; Whelan 86' (o.g.); Longelo (yellow card) 88' | Report | Mellish (yellow card) 20'; Back (yellow card) 39'; Ablade (yellow card) 54'; Robinson (yellow card) 89' | Stadium: Crown Ground; Attendance: 888; Referee: Scott Jackson |

| 10 October 2023 Group stage | Harrogate Town | 3–5 | Accrington Stanley | Harrogate |
| 19:45 BST | Folarin 35', 76'; Mattock 58' | Report | Trickett 27', 89'; Adedoyin 30', 37', 51'; Shipley (yellow card) 61'; Rich-Baghuelou (yellow card) 74' | Stadium: Wetherby Road; Attendance: 959; Referee: Marc Edwards |

| 21 November 2023 Group stage | Accrington Stanley | 1–2 | Nottingham Forest U21 | Accrington |
| 19:45 GMT | Woods (yellow card) 21'; Adedoyin (yellow card) 49' (goal) 58'; Devonport (yellow card) 75'; Nolan (penalty missed) 90+2' | Report | Thompson 18'; Perry (yellow card) 35'; Larsson 39'; Konaté (yellow card) 72'; Abbott (yellow card) 84'; Bott (yellow card) 90+6' | Stadium: Crown Ground; Attendance: 687; Referee: Marc Edwards |

| 12 December 2023 Second round | Accrington Stanley | 1–0 | Lincoln City | Accrington |
| 19:45 GMT | Henderson (yellow card) 23'; Woods (yellow card) 43'; Longelo 90+3' | Report | Duffy (yellow card) 73'; Roughan (yellow card) 90+1' | Stadium: Crown Ground; Attendance: 1,159; Referee: Martin Woods |
Note: Fixture was originally scheduled for 5 December but was postponed due to a frozen playing surface.

| 10 January 2024 Third round | Accrington Stanley | 1–3 | Bolton Wanderers | Accrington |
| 19:30 GMT | Henderson 37'; Martin (yellow card) 51'; Woods (yellow card) 71'; O'Brien (yellow card) 74'; Hills (yellow card) 87' | Report | Jerome 15'; Morley 29' (pen.); Dempsey 83' | Stadium: Crown Ground; Attendance: 3,441; Referee: Marc Edwards |
