= 2022–23 Accrington Stanley F.C. season =

English association football club season

Accrington Stanley
2022–23 season
- Owner: Andy Holt
- Manager: John Coleman
- Stadium: Crown Ground
- League One: 23rd (relegated)
- FA Cup: Fourth round
- EFL Cup: First round
- EFL Trophy: Semi-finals
- Highest home attendance: 5,268 vs Leeds United, 28 January 2023, FA Cup
Home colours	Away colours	Third colours

The 2022–23 season was the 54th season in the existence of Accrington Stanley Football Club and the club's fifth consecutive season in League One. In addition to the league, they also competed in the 2022–23 FA Cup, the 2022–23 EFL Cup and the 2022–23 EFL Trophy.

== Transfers ==
=== In ===
Date	Pos	Player	Transferred from	Fee	Ref
15 June 2022	CM	(England) Matt Lowe	(England) Brackley Town	Free Transfer	
1 July 2022 (Note: The transfer was announced on 31 May, and would become official on July 1 once his Newcastle United contract expired.)	CM	(Liberia) Mohammed Sangare	(England) Newcastle United	Free Transfer	
4 July 2022	RW	(England) Shaun Whalley	(England) Shrewsbury Town	Free Transfer	
25 July 2022	CF	(Spain) Alhagi Touray Sisay	(Wales) Haverfordwest County	Free Transfer	
25 July 2022	CF	(Spain) Enock Lusiama	(England) Daisy Hill	Free Transfer	
8 August 2022	CB	(Portugal) Baba Fernandes	(England) Nottingham Forest	Free Transfer	
1 September 2022	LB	(England) Bailey Sloane	(England) Clitheroe	Undisclosed	
20 September 2022	CF	(England) Nathan Delfouneso	(England) Bolton Wanderers	Free Transfer	
19 January 2023	RM	(England) Sebastian Quirk	(England) Everton	Undisclosed	
20 February 2023	CM	(France) Anthony Mancini	Free agent	—N/a	

=== Out ===
Date	Pos	Player	Transferred to	Fee	Ref
10 June 2022	RM	(Republic of Ireland) John O'Sullivan	(Republic of Ireland) Bohemians	Undisclosed	
23 June 2022	CB	(England) Ross Sykes	(Belgium) Union SG	Undisclosed	
30 June 2022 (Note: The transfer was announced on 20 June, and would become official once his contract expired)	DM	(England) Matt Butcher	(England) Plymouth Argyle	Free Transfer	
30 June 2022	CF	(England) Lewis Mansell	(England) Ramsbottom United	Released	
30 June 2022	CM	(England) Ben Pleavin	(United States) Duquesne Dukes	Released	
30 June 2022	CB	(Germany) Stephen Sama	Unattached	Released	
30 June 2022	CF	(England) Kevin Spinelli	(England) Ashton United	Released	
30 June 2022	MF	(England) Luke Stowe	(England) Colne	Released	
21 July 2022	CF	(England) Colby Bishop	(England) Portsmouth	Undisclosed	
24 August 2022	CM	(England) Harry Pell	(England) AFC Wimbledon	Undisclosed	
4 November 2022	CB	(England) Archie Procter	(England) Dorking Wanderers	Free Transfer	
12 November 2022	DM	(England) Tom Scully	(England) Nantwich Town	Free Transfer	
20 January 2023	CF	(England) Nathan Delfouneso	(England) AFC Fylde	Released	
31 January 2023	CB	(England) Matty Carson	(England) Reading	Released	
3 February 2023	GK	(England) Louis Hood	(England) Darwen	Free Transfer	
3 March 2023	CB	(England) Harry Perritt	(England) Altrincham	Free Transfer	

=== Loans in ===
Date	Pos	Player	Loaned from	On loan until	Ref
28 June 2022	GK	(Denmark) Lukas Jensen	(England) Burnley	End of Season	
13 July 2022	CB	(Wales) Ryan Astley	(England) Everton	End of Season	
15 August 2022	CB	(England) Doug Tharme	(England) Blackpool	End of Season	
4 January 2023	CF	(Scotland) Aaron Pressley	(England) Brentford	End of Season	
31 January 2023	CF	(England) Nathan Butler-Oyedeji	(England) Arsenal	End of Season	

=== Loans out ===
Date	Pos	Player	Loaned to	On loan until	Ref
4 August 2022	CF	(Spain) Enock Lusiama	(England) Southport	4 September 2022	
6 August 2022	LB	(England) Matty Carson	(England) AFC Telford United	6 September 2022	
17 August 2022	MF	(England) Rhys-James Fenlon	(England) Chorley	17 September 2022	
6 September 2022	CF	(Republic of Ireland) Leslie Adekoya	(England) Witton Albion	6 October 2022	
13 September 2022	DM	(England) Tom Scully	(England) Nantwich Town	13 October 2022	
1 October 2022	CM	(England) Oliver Patrick	(England) Bamber Bridge	1 November 2022	
14 October 2022	GK	(England) Max Clayton	(England) Darwen	Work Experience	
14 October 2022	CB	(England) Aaron Pickles	(England) Glossop North End	Work Experience	
15 October 2022	LB	(England) Matty Carson	(England) Stalybridge Celtic	15 November 2022	
15 October 2022	CM	(England) Dylan Moonan	(England) Stalybridge Celtic	15 November 2022	
21 October 2022	CF	(Spain) Enock Lusiama	(England) Colne	21 November 2022	
11 November 2022	LB	(England) Bailey Sloane	(England) AFC Telford United	11 December 2022	
3 December 2022	LB	(Republic of Ireland) Connor O'Brien	(England) Radcliffe	3 January 2023	
23 December 2022	CM	(England) Dylan Moonan	(England) FC United of Manchester	23 January 2023	
31 December 2022	CM	(England) Oliver Patrick	(England) Nantwich Town	31 January 2023	
13 January 2023	MF	(England) Alex Henderson	(England) Colne	Work Experience	
3 February 2023	MF	(England) Owen Devonport	(England) Clitheroe	3 March 2023	
3 February 2023	GK	(England) Liam Isherwood	(England) Marine	3 March 2023	
16 February 2023	GK	(England) Toby Savin	(England) Stevenage	10 March 2023 (Note: On 24 February, Savin's emergency loan at Stevenage was extended by a further seven days. On 3 March, another seven-days was added on to the loan deal)	
23 February 2023	LB	(England) Bailey Sloane	(England) Radcliffe	23 March 2023	
18 March 2023	CF	(England) Joe Hardy	(England) Marine	End of Season	

== Pre-season and friendlies ==
Stanley announced their first pre-season friendly on 17 May, with Blackburn Rovers visiting on 9 July. A further match with Stoke City was confirmed on 18 May. On 30 May, a third friendly, a home fixture against Preston North End was added. Sunderland was also confirmed as visitors to the Wham Stadium. A fifth home pre-season friendly was confirmed, against Wigan Athletic. A behind-closed-doors meeting against Crystal Palace was also added.

Win Draw Loss Fixtures

2 July 2022 Friendly	Crystal Palace	1–1	Accrington Stanley	Beckenham
13:00 BST	Mateta 22'	Report	Lowe 49'	Stadium: Crystal Palace Training Ground; Attendance: 0 (behind-closed-doors)

9 July 2022 Friendly	Accrington Stanley	1–0	Blackburn Rovers	Accrington
15:00 BST	Lowe 51'	Report		Stadium: Wham Stadium; Attendance: 4,961
Note: Match one of two 60-minute matches

9 July 2022 Friendly	Accrington Stanley	0–2	Blackburn Rovers	Accrington
16:30 BST		Report	Vale 40'; Dolan 45'	Stadium: Wham Stadium; Attendance: 4,961
Note: Match two of two 60-minute matches

13 July 2022 Friendly	Accrington Stanley	2–0	Stoke City	Accrington
19:00 BST	McConville 9', 10'	Report		Stadium: Wham Stadium; Attendance: 1,098

16 July 2022 Friendly	Accrington Stanley	0–1	Preston North End	Accrington
15:00 BST		Report	Riis Jakobsen 38'	Stadium: Wham Stadium; Attendance: 1,897

19 July 2022 Friendly	Accrington Stanley	0–0	Wigan Athletic	Accrington
19:00 BST		Report		Stadium: Wham Stadium; Attendance: 857

23 July 2022 Friendly	Accrington Stanley	2–1	Sunderland	Accrington
15:00 BST	McConville 62' (pen.); Adedoyin 75'	Report	Stewart 45+2' (pen.)	Stadium: Wham Stadium; Attendance: 1,782

== Competitions ==
=== Overall record ===
Competition	First match	Last match	Starting round	Record							
Competition	First match	Last match	Starting round	Pld	W	D	L	GF	GA	GD	Win %
League One	August 2022	May 2023	Matchday 1	2	1	1	0	3	2	+1	50.00
FA Cup	TBC	TBC	First round proper	0	0	0	0	0	0	+0	—
EFL Cup	TBC	TBC	First round	0	0	0	0	0	0	+0	—
EFL Trophy	TBC	TBC	Group stage	0	0	0	0	0	0	+0	—
Total				2	1	1	0	3	2	+1	50.00

Last updated: pre-season
Source: [ Soccerway]

=== League One ===
==== League table ====
Pos	Team	Pld	W	D	L	GF	GA	GD	Pts	Promotion, qualification or relegation
19	Oxford United	46	11	14	21	49	56	−7	47	
20	Cambridge United	46	13	7	26	41	68	−27	46	
21	Milton Keynes Dons (R)	46	11	12	23	44	66	−22	45	Relegation to EFL League Two
22	Morecambe (R)	46	10	14	22	47	78	−31	44	Relegation to EFL League Two
23	Accrington Stanley (R)	46	11	11	24	40	77	−37	44	Relegation to EFL League Two
24	Forest Green Rovers (R)	46	6	9	31	31	89	−58	27	Relegation to EFL League Two

Source: EFL Official Website
Rules for classification: 1) Points; 2) Goal difference; 3) Number of goals scored; 4) Head-to-head results; 5) Wins; 6) Away goals; 7) Penalty points (sec 9.5); 8) 12-point sending off offences
(R) Relegated

==== Results summary ====
Overall								Home						Away					
Pld	W	D	L	GF	GA	GD	Pts	W	D	L	GF	GA	GD	W	D	L	GF	GA	GD
46	11	11	24	40	77	−37	44	6	5	12	27	39	−12	5	6	12	13	38	−25

Last updated: 29 April 2023.
Source: [ Soccerway]

==== Results by round ====
Round	1	2	3	4	5	6	7	8	9	10	11	12	13	14	15	16	17	18	19	20	21	22	23	24	25	26	27	28	29	30	31	32	33	34	35	36	37	38	39	40	41	42	43	44	45	46
Ground	H	A	H	A	H	H	A	A	H	A	H	A	H	H	A	A	A	H	A	H	H	A	A	H	A	H	A	A	H	H	A	H	A	A	H	H	H	A	H	A	H	H	A	A	H	A
Result	D	W	D	D	D	L	L	L	W	W	W	L	L	L	L	L	D	L	W	D	D	L	L	W	L	L	D	D	L	W	D	W	L	D	L	L	L	L	W	L	L	L	L	W	L	W
Position	11	6	10	12	11	18	19	21	18	13	9	12	16	17	19	20	20	20	20	19	20	21	20	19	20	23	22	22	22	20	21	20	20	20	20	21	21	21	21	21	23	23	23	22	23	23

Updated to match(es) played on 29 April 2023. Source: [ Soccerway]
A = Away; H = Home; W = Win; D = Draw; L = Loss; P = Postponed

==== Matches ====
Win Draw Loss Fixtures

On 23 June, the league fixtures were announced.

===== July =====
30 July 2022 1	Accrington Stanley	2–2	Charlton Athletic	Accrington
15:00 BST	Sangare (yellow card) 31'; Hamilton (yellow card) 60'; Rich-Baghuelou (yellow card) 62'; McConville 69'; Adedoyin 90+6'	Report	Fraser 36'; Leaburn 90+4'	Stadium: Wham Stadium; Attendance: 2,767; Referee: Ben Speedie

===== August =====
6 August 2022 2	Shrewsbury Town	0–1	Accrington Stanley	Shrewsbury
15:00 BST	Flanagan (yellow card) 57' (yellow-red card) 57'	Report	Coyle (yellow card) 45+6'; Whalley (yellow card) 68'; Leigh 77'	Stadium: Montgomery Waters Meadow; Attendance: 6,117; Referee: Andy Haines

13 August 2022 3	Accrington Stanley	4–4	Burton Albion	Accrington
15:00 BST	Pritchard 52'; McConville 57'; Woods 90'; Longelo 90+6'	Report	Keillor-Dunn 10' (pen.), 17', 50'; Ahadme 81'	Stadium: Wham Stadium; Attendance: 1,997; Referee: Sam Barrott

16 August 2022	Forest Green Rovers	Postponed	Accrington Stanley	Nailsworth
19:45 BST				Stadium: The innocent New Lawn Stadium
Note: Match was postponed due to a unplayable playing surface.

20 August 2022 4	Milton Keynes Dons	1–1	Accrington Stanley	Denbigh
15:00 BST	Robson 30'; Johnson (yellow card) 61'; Lawrence (yellow card) 70'	Report	Astley (yellow card) 10'; Clark (yellow card) 43'; Hamilton (yellow card) 60'; McConville (yellow card) 68', (goal) 78' (pen.)	Stadium: Stadium MK; Referee: Tom Reeves

27 August 2022 5	Accrington Stanley	0–0	Exeter City	Accrington
15:00 BST	Pritchard (yellow card) 81'	Report	Stubbs (yellow card) 56'	Stadium: Wham Stadium; Attendance: 2,170; Referee: Seb Stockbridge

===== September =====
3 September 2022 6	Accrington Stanley	0–2	Ipswich Town	Accrington
15:00 BST	Leigh (yellow card) 56'; Tharme (yellow card) 79'; Hamilton (yellow card) 85'	Report	Woolfenden (yellow card) 14'; Davis (yellow card) 20'; Burns (yellow card) 73', (goal) 87'; Chaplin 76'	Stadium: Wham Stadium; Attendance: 3,069; Referee: Anthony Backhouse

6 September 2022 7	Forest Green Rovers	2–1	Accrington Stanley	Nailsworth
19:45 BST	Brown 37', (yellow card) 63'; Peart-Harris (yellow card) 39'; March 81'; Bernard (yellow card) 90+3'	Report	Coyle (yellow card) 38'; Leigh 76'	Stadium: The innocent New Lawn Stadium; Attendance: 2,007; Referee: Andy Woolmer

10 September 2022	Lincoln City	Postponed	Accrington Stanley	Lincoln
15:00 BST				Stadium: LNER Stadium
Note: Fixture was postponed as a mark of respect following the passing of Queen Elizabeth II.

13 September 2022 8	Wycombe Wanderers	1–0	Accrington Stanley	High Wycombe
19:45 BST	McCarthy 21'; Scowen (yellow card) 90+4'	Report	Tharme (yellow card) 17'; Coyle (yellow card) 47'	Stadium: Adams Park; Attendance: 3,704; Referee: Darren Drysdale

17 September 2022 9	Accrington Stanley	1–0	Cheltenham Town	Accrington
15:00 BST	McConville 1'; Astley (yellow card) 76'; Pritchard (yellow card) 81'; Jensen (yellow card) 89'	Report	Jackson (yellow card) 53'; Perry (yellow card) 81'	Stadium: Wham Stadium; Attendance: 1,996; Referee: Steve Martin

24 September 2022 10	Bristol Rovers	0–1	Accrington Stanley	Horfield
15:00 BST	Loft (yellow card) 61'; Evans (yellow card) 90+4'	Report	Astley (yellow card) 43'; Pritchard 54'; McConville (yellow card) 71'; Rodgers (yellow card) 90+3'	Stadium: Memorial Stadium; Attendance: 8,906; Referee: Lee Swabey

===== October =====
1 October 2022 11	Accrington Stanley	3–1	Morecambe	Accrington
15:00 BST	Conneely (yellow card) 29'; Tharme (yellow card) 53'; Coyle 58'; Hamilton 81'; Leigh 85'	Report	Gibson (yellow card) 28'; Gnahoua (red card) 45+1'; Fané (yellow card) 61'; Astley 77' (o.g.); Rawson (yellow card) 82'; Love (yellow card) 88'	Stadium: Wham Stadium; Attendance: 2,916; Referee: James Oldham

8 October 2022 12	Plymouth Argyle	3–0	Accrington Stanley	Plymouth
15:00 BST	Ennis 24' (yellow card) 67'; Mumba (yellow card) 33'; Scarr (red card) 38'; Cosgrove (yellow card) 39' (goal) 63'; Galloway (yellow card) 90+2'; Hardie 90+3'	Report	Hamilton (yellow card) 1'; Conneely (red card) 38'; Coyle (yellow card) 39'; Whalley (yellow card) 56'	Stadium: Home Park; Attendance: 15,065; Referee: Neil Hair

15 October 2022 13	Accrington Stanley	0–3	Derby County	Accrington
15:00 BST	McConville (penalty missed) 36' (penalty missed) 38'; Tharme (yellow card) 51'	Report	Osula 15' 39'; Cashin (yellow card) 28'; Davies (yellow card) 37'; Barkhuizen 90+8'	Stadium: Wham Stadium; Attendance: 4,879; Referee: Will Finnie

22 October 2022 14	Accrington Stanley	2–3	Bolton Wanderers	Accrington
15:00 BST	Whalley 8' (yellow card) 77'; Clark (yellow card) 42'; Johnston 48' (o.g.); McConville (yellow card) 50'; Rodgers (yellow card) 59'	Report	Rodgers 56' (o.g.); Lee 71'; Afolayan 75'; Jones (yellow card) 90+2'	Stadium: Wham Stadium; Attendance: 4,829; Referee: Bobby Madden

25 October 2022 15	Peterborough United	3–1	Accrington Stanley	Peterborough
19:45 BST	Fuchs (yellow card) 23'; Mason-Clark 33'; Poku 51'; Taylor (yellow card) 56'; Clarke-Harris 59'	Report	Coyle (yellow card) 10'; Rodgers 25' (yellow card) 90+3'; Tharme (yellow card) 63'; Astley (yellow card) 65'	Stadium: Weston Homes Stadium; Attendance: 7,181; Referee: Craig Hicks

29 October 2022 16	Fleetwood Town	3–0	Accrington Stanley	Fleetwood
15:00 BST	Mendes Gomes (yellow card) 13' (goal) 50'; Rooney 54'; Earl 59' (yellow card) 68'; Sarpong-Wiredu (yellow card) 62'	Report	Whalley (yellow card) 25'	Stadium: Highbury Stadium; Attendance: 3,115; Referee: Geoff Eltringham

===== November =====
1 November 2022 17	Lincoln City	1–1	Accrington Stanley	Lincoln
19:45 GMT	Virtue (yellow card) 27'; House (yellow card) 45+1'; Diamond 60' (pen.); Poole (yellow card) 82'	Report	Clark (yellow card) 45+1'; Tharme (yellow card) 50'; Coyle (yellow card) 54'; Longelo (yellow card) 83'; Rodgers 85'	Stadium: LNER Stadium; Attendance: 7,317; Referee: Ross Joyce

12 November 2022 18	Accrington Stanley	0–1	Sheffield Wednesday	Accrington
15:00 GMT	Fernandes (yellow card) 81'	Report	Mighten 24'; Ihiekwe (yellow card) 33'; James (yellow card) 66'; Vaulks (yellow card) 89'	Stadium: Wham Stadium; Attendance: 4,938; Referee: Charles Breakspear

19 November 2022 19	Cambridge United	0–1	Accrington Stanley	Cambridge
15:00 GMT	Williams (yellow card) 65'	Report	Rodgers 45+2', (yellow card) 71'; Perritt (yellow card) 90+3'	Stadium: The Abbey Stadium; Attendance: 6,022; Referee: Christopher Pollard

===== December =====
3 December 2022 20	Accrington Stanley	1–1	Oxford United	Accrington
15:00 GMT	Tharme (yellow card) 35'; Astley (yellow card) 57'; Leigh (yellow card) 62'; Hamilton 84'; Pritchard (yellow card) 86'	Report	Henry 58'; Brown (yellow card) 73'; Murphy (yellow card) 78'	Stadium: Wham Stadium; Attendance: 2,447; Referee: Sam Barrott

10 December 2022	Accrington Stanley	Postponed	Portsmouth	Accrington
15:00 GMT				Stadium: Wham Stadium
Note: Fixture was postponed due to a frozen pitch.

17 December 2022	Port Vale	Postponed	Accrington Stanley	Burslem
15:00 GMT				Stadium: Vale Park
Note: Fixture was postponed due to the playing surface being unplayable.

26 December 2022 21	Accrington Stanley	1–1	Barnsley	Accrington
15:00 GMT	Conneely (yellow card) 37'; Leigh 62' (pen.); Perritt (yellow card) 90+4'	Report	Norwood 8'; Connell (yellow card) 31'; Kane (yellow card) 80'; Cundy (yellow card) 81'	Stadium: Wham Stadium; Attendance: 4,791; Referee: Rebecca Welch

29 December 2022 22	Morecambe	2–0	Accrington Stanley	Morecambe
19:45 GMT	Shaw 34'; Weir 43'; Bedeau (yellow card) 65'	Report	Pritchard (yellow card) 57'; Rodgers (yellow card) 90+4'	Stadium: The Mazuma Stadium; Attendance: 4,191; Referee: Seb Stockbridge

===== January =====
2 January 2023 23	Derby County	4–0	Accrington Stanley	Derby
15:00 GMT	Barkhuizen 7', 46'; Smith (yellow card) 11'; Hourihane 16'; Sibley (yellow card) 29'; McGoldrick 45+2' (pen.); Forsyth (yellow card) 62'; Osula (red card) 79'	Report	Whalley (yellow card) 13'; Rodgers (yellow card) 21'; Fernandes (yellow card) 35'	Stadium: Pride Park; Attendance: 26,816; Referee: Martin Woods

14 January 2023 24	Accrington Stanley	2–0	Bristol Rovers	Accrington
15:00 GMT	Coyle (yellow card) 28'; Leigh 51'; Rodgers (yellow card) 55'; Astley 79'; Martin (yellow card) 86'; Hamilton (yellow card) 89'	Report	Sinclair (yellow card) 25'; Finley (yellow card) 90+4'	Stadium: Wham Stadium; Attendance: 2,510; Referee: Tom Nield

21 January 2023 25	Barnsley	3–1	Accrington Stanley	Barnsley
15:00 GMT	Norwood 5'; Aitchison 8'; Williams 19'; Thomas (yellow card) 23'	Report	Hamilton (yellow card) 26'; Coyle (yellow card) 73'; Leigh 90+4' (pen.)	Stadium: Oakwell Stadium; Attendance: 9,893; Referee: Carl Brook

===== February =====
4 February 2023 26	Accrington Stanley	0–3	Lincoln City	Accrington
15:00 GMT	Tharme (yellow card) 39'; Perritt (red card) 56'; Woods (yellow card) 75'	Report	House 24', (yellow card) 60'; Roughan 55'; Bishop 58'; O'Connor (yellow card) 89'	Stadium: Wham Stadium; Attendance: 2,382; Referee: Sam Purkiss

7 February 2023 27	Port Vale	1–1	Accrington Stanley	Burslem
19:45 GMT	Ojo (yellow card) 30'; Smith (yellow card) 34'; Worrall 57'; Donnelly (yellow card) 63'; Benning (yellow card) 67'; Butterworth (penalty missed) 76'	Report	Pressley 52' (pen.); Fernandes (yellow card) 73'; Rodgers (red card) 75'; McConville (yellow card) 88'	Stadium: Vale Park; Attendance: 4,729; Referee: Adam Herczeg

11 February 2023 28	Cheltenham Town	0–0	Accrington Stanley	Cheltenham
15:00 GMT	Broom (yellow card) 25'; Raglan (yellow card) 90+2'; Taylor (yellow card) 90+8'	Report	Whalley (yellow card) 56'; Coyle (yellow card) 90+6'; Fernandes (yellow card) 90+8'	Stadium: The Completely Suzuki Stadium; Attendance: 4,325; Referee: Will Finnie

14 February 2023 29	Accrington Stanley	0–2	Wycombe Wanderers	Accrington
19:45 GMT	Sangare (yellow card) 36'; Coyle (yellow card) 81'	Report	Scowen 18'; Vokes (yellow card) 38'; McCleary 90'	Stadium: Wham Stadium; Attendance: 1,900 (201 away fans); Referee: Lewis Smith

18 February 2023 30	Accrington Stanley	1–0	Shrewsbury Town	Accrington
15:00 GMT	Pressley 12'; Longelo (yellow card) 67'; Sangare (yellow card) 77'; Fernandes (yellow card) 90+8'	Report	Winchester (yellow card) 16'; Saydee (yellow card) 50'; Phillips (yellow card) 90+8'	Stadium: Wham Stadium; Attendance: 2,858 (807 away); Referee: Anthony Backhouse

25 February 2023 31	Burton Albion	0–0	Accrington Stanley	Burton upon Trent
15:00 GMT	Lavelle (yellow card) 76'	Report	Whalley (yellow card) 87'; McConville (yellow card) 90+5'	Stadium: Pirelli Stadium; Attendance: 2,578; Referee: Josh Smith

===== March =====
4 March 2023 32	Accrington Stanley	2–1	Forest Green Rovers	Accrington
15:00 GMT	Rodgers (yellow card) 12'; Pressley 44'; Longelo 64'	Report	Peart-Harris 22'; Casey (red card) 43'; O'Keeffe (yellow card) 45'; Robson (yellow card) 85'; Omotoye (yellow card) 90+2'	Stadium: Wham Stadium; Attendance: 2,224 (210 from FGR); Referee: Declan Bourne

7 March 2023 33	Ipswich Town	3–0	Accrington Stanley	Ipswich
19:45 GMT	Broadhead 12'; Burgess (yellow card) 42'; Jackson 56'; Edwards 90+4'	Report	Jensen (red card) 90+1'; Fernandes (yellow card) 90+3'	Stadium: Portman Road; Attendance: 22,413; Referee: Lee Swabey

11 March 2023 34	Charlton Athletic	1–1	Accrington Stanley	Charlton
15:00 GMT	Sessegnon 37'; Dobson (yellow card) 54'; Morgan (yellow card) 90+7'	Report	Whalley 28'; Rodgers (yellow card) 49'; Tharme (yellow card) 61'; Conneely (yellow card) 90+6'	Stadium: The Valley; Attendance: 11,972; Referee: Darren Drysdale

14 March 2023 35	Accrington Stanley	1–3	Portsmouth	Accrington
19:45 GMT	Jensen (red card) 10'; Rodgers (yellow card) 49'; Fernandes (yellow card) 62'; Leigh (yellow card) 73'; Adedoyin 88'	Report	Pigott 13', (red card) 66'; Morrell (yellow card) 46'; Hackett-Fairchild 57'; Bishop 81'; Scarlett (yellow card) 90+5'	Stadium: Wham Stadium; Attendance: 2,473 (603 from Pompey); Referee: David Rock

18 March 2023 36	Accrington Stanley	0–1	Milton Keynes Dons	Accrington
15:00 GMT	Nottingham (yellow card) 39'; Tharme (yellow card) 45+1'; Leigh (yellow card) 80'	Report	Kaikai 8'; Lewington (yellow card) 47'; Watson (yellow card) 64'	Stadium: Wham Stadium; Attendance: 2,465 (290 from MK Dons); Referee: Craig Hicks

21 March 2023 37	Accrington Stanley	0–2	Plymouth Argyle	Accrington
19:45 GMT	Sangare (yellow card) 17' (yellow-red card) 51'; McConville (yellow card) 38'; Martin (yellow card) 42'; Longelo (yellow card) 90+4'	Report	Butcher 14'; Grant 78'	Stadium: Wham Stadium; Attendance: 2,489 (689 from Plymouth); Referee: James Bell

25 March 2023 38	Exeter City	5-0	Accrington Stanley	Exeter
15:00 GMT	Mitchell 36'; McDonald (yellow card) 44'; Key 49'; Nombe 54'; Scott 75'; Stansfield 81'	Report	Adedoyin (yellow card) 44'	Stadium: St James Park; Attendance: 6,556; Referee: Oliver Langford

===== April =====
7 April 2023 39	Accrington Stanley	3–0	Port Vale	Accrington
15:00 BST	Stevens 31' (o.g.); Rodgers 40'; Pressley 68' (pen.); Butler-Oyedeji (yellow card) 90+4'	Report	Ojo (red card) 90+3'; Massey (yellow card) 90+4'	Stadium: Wham Stadium; Attendance: 3,444 (1,173 from Port Vale); Referee: Andy Woolmer

10 April 2023 40	Sheffield Wednesday	3–0	Accrington Stanley	Owlerton
15:00 BST	Adeniran 11', 46'; Palmer 72'	Report	Rodgers (yellow card) 16'; Hamilton (yellow card) 65'	Stadium: Hillsborough Stadium; Attendance: 25,025; Referee: Neil Hair

15 April 2023 41	Accrington Stanley	2–5	Fleetwood Town	Accrington
15:00 BST	McConville (yellow card) 27'; Coyle (red card) 45+4'; Clark (yellow card) 49'; Nottingham 65'; Leigh 81'	Report	Marriott 9', 35', 90+3'; Robertson (yellow card) 45+1'; Omochere (yellow card) 47', (goal) 57'; Earl (yellow card) 80'; Sarpong-Wiredu (yellow card) 85'; Patterson 90'	Stadium: Wham Stadium; Attendance: 2,624 (386 from FTFC); Referee: Marc Edwards

18 April 2023 42	Accrington Stanley	1–2	Peterborough United	Accrington
19:45 BST	Rodgers (yellow card) 61'; McConville 87'	Report	Clarke-Harris 23'; Mason-Clark 43'; Norburn (yellow card) 53'; Edwards (yellow card) 66'; Butler (yellow card) 80'	Stadium: Wham Stadium; Attendance: 2,064 (333 from PUFC); Referee: Tom Reeves

22 April 2023 43	Portsmouth	1–0	Accrington Stanley	Milton
15:00 BST	Pigott 75'	Report	Clark (yellow card) 19'; McConville (yellow card) 69'	Stadium: Fratton Park; Attendance: 17,594; Referee: Darren Drysdale

25 April 2023 44	Bolton Wanderers	0–1	Accrington Stanley	Horwich
19:45 BST		Report	Hamilton 42'	Stadium: University of Bolton Stadium; Attendance: 17,406 (257 away); Referee: James Linington

29 April 2023 45	Accrington Stanley	1–2	Cambridge United	Accrington
15:00 BST	Coyle (yellow card) 73'; Whalley (yellow card) 80'; Pressley 83' (pen.)	Report	Lankester (yellow card) 28'; Dunk 42'; Digby (yellow card) 45+3'; Thomas 65'	Stadium: Wham Stadium; Attendance: 4,484 (652 from Cambridge); Referee: Rebecca Welch

===== May =====
7 May 2023 46	Oxford United	1–2	Accrington Stanley	Littlemore
15:00 BST	Bodin 8'; Joseph (yellow card) 79'	Report	Adedoyin 64'; Pressley 85'; Coyle (yellow card) 57'; Hamilton (yellow card) 90'	Stadium: Kassam Stadium; Attendance: 10,499 (265 away); Referee: Sam Allison

=== FA Cup ===
Accrington were drawn away to Crawley Town in the first round, at home to Barnet in the second round and away to Boreham Wood in the third round.

Win Draw Loss Fixtures

5 November 2022 First round	Crawley Town	1–4	Accrington Stanley	Crawley
15:00 GMT	Hessenthaler 18'; Lynch (yellow card) 51'; Ransom (yellow card) 73'; Craig (yellow card) 85'	Report	Whalley 1', 22', 49'; Coyle (yellow card) 25'; Hamilton 45'; Savin (yellow card) 79'; Leigh (yellow card) 79'	Stadium: Broadfield Stadium; Attendance: 2,770; Referee: Ollie Yates

26 November 2022 Second round	Accrington Stanley	1–0	Barnet	Accrington
15:00 GMT	Hamilton (yellow card) 74', (goal) 84'	Report	Okimo (yellow card) 28'; Kabamba (yellow card) 29'; Gorman (yellow card) 41'	Stadium: Wham Stadium; Attendance: 1,771; Referee: Adam Herczeg

7 January 2023 Third round	Boreham Wood	1–1	Accrington Stanley	Borehamwood
15:00 GMT	Newton (yellow card) 45'; Evans (yellow card) 70'; Ndlovu 78'; Sousa (yellow card) 84'; Ilesanmi (yellow card) 88'	Report	Astley 6'; Whalley (yellow card) 53'; Savin (yellow card) 58'; Perritt (yellow card) 71'	Stadium: Meadow Park; Attendance: 2,001; Referee: Oliver Langford

24 January 2023 Third round replay	Accrington Stanley	1–0 (a.e.t.)	Boreham Wood	Accrington
19:45 GMT	Tharme (yellow card) 32'; Leigh 97' (pen.); Coyle (yellow card) 120+3'	Report	Rees (yellow card) 39'; Marsh (yellow card) 48'; Agbontohoma (yellow card) 81'	Stadium: Wham Stadium; Attendance: 1,940; Referee: Scott Oldham
Note: Fixture was postponed from 17 January to 24 January due to an unplayable playing surface.

28 January 2023 Fourth round	Accrington Stanley	1–3	Leeds United	Accrington
12:30 GMT	Coyle (yellow card) 39'; Adekoya 81', (yellow card) 90+4'	Report	Harrison 23'; Firpo 66'; Sinisterra 68'; Greenwood (yellow card) 70'	Stadium: Crown Ground; Attendance: 5,268; Referee: Josh Smith

=== EFL Cup ===
Win Draw Loss Fixtures

Stanley were drawn at home to Tranmere Rovers in the first round.

9 August 2022 First round	Accrington Stanley	2–2 (11–12 p)	Tranmere Rovers	Accrington
19:45 BST	Adedoyin 37'; Astley 39'; Clark (yellow card) 90+2'	Report	Hawkes 62'; Astley 90+3' (o.g.)	Stadium: Wham Stadium; Attendance: 1,035; Referee: Robert Lewis
	Penalties
	McConville (penalty scored); Whalley (penalty scored); Pritchard (penalty missed); Astley (penalty scored); Pell (penalty scored); Clark (penalty scored); Woods (penalty scored); Coyle (penalty scored); Sangare (penalty scored); Rodgers (penalty scored); Jensen (penalty scored); McConville (penalty scored); Whalley (penalty missed)		Hemmings (penalty scored); Hawkes (penalty scored); Hughes (penalty missed); Lewis (penalty scored); Robinson (penalty scored); McAlear (penalty scored); Byrne (penalty scored); Dacres-Cogley (penalty scored); Bristow (penalty scored); Mumbongo (penalty scored); Hewelt (penalty scored); Hemmings (penalty scored); Hawkes (penalty scored)

=== EFL Trophy ===
On 20 June, the initial Group stage draw was made, grouping Accrington with Rochdale and Salford City. Three days later, Liverpool U21s joined Northern Group D. Stanley were drawn away to Grimsby Town in the second round to Burton Albion in the third round and to Lincoln City in the quarter-final. In the semi-finals, Accrington Stanley were drawn at home to Bolton Wanderers.

Pos	Div	Team	Pld	W	PW	PL	L	GF	GA	GD	Pts	Qualification
1	L2	Salford City	3	1	2	0	0	4	3	+1	7	Advance to Round 2
2	L1	Accrington Stanley	3	1	1	1	0	6	5	+1	6	Advance to Round 2
3	L2	Rochdale	3	1	0	2	0	6	5	+1	5	
4	ACA	Liverpool U21	3	0	0	0	3	3	6	−3	0	

Source: EFL.com

Win Draw Loss Fixtures

30 August 2022 Group stage	Accrington Stanley	3–3 (4–3 p)	Rochdale	Accrington
19:45 BST	McConville 51'; Lowe 55'; Woods (yellow card) 62'; Coyle (yellow card) 79'; Pritchard (yellow card) 87'; Sinclair 90+4' (o.g.)	Report	Graham (yellow card) 35'; Ball 65'; Henderson 67'; Brierley 72'	Stadium: Wham Stadium; Attendance: 1,130; Referee: Peter Wright
	Penalties
	Savin (penalty scored); McConville (penalty scored); Leigh (penalty scored); Woods (penalty scored)		Henderson (penalty scored); Brierley (penalty scored); Sinclair (penalty missed); Kelly (penalty scored); White (penalty missed)

20 September 2022 Group stage	Salford City	0–0 (4–2 p)	Accrington Stanley	Salford
19:30 BST	O'Brien (yellow card) 41'; Jenkins (yellow card) 80'; Chapman (yellow card) 90+5'	Report	Tharme (yellow card) 53'; Sloane (yellow card) 82'; Clark (yellow card) 90+4'	Stadium: Moor Lane; Attendance: 722; Referee: Thomas Kirk
	Penalties
	Smith (penalty scored); Hendry (penalty scored); Tolaj (penalty scored); Galbraith (penalty scored)		Savin (penalty missed); McConville (penalty scored); Coyle (penalty scored); Martin (penalty missed)

18 October 2022 Group stage	Accrington Stanley	3–2	Liverpool U21	Accrington
19:45 BST	Leigh 12' 46'; Coyle (yellow card) 59'; Astley 70'	Report	Ramsay 90+1'; Doak 90+3'	Stadium: Wham Stadium; Attendance: 865; Referee: Andrew Kitchen

22 November 2022 Second round	Grimsby Town	0–1	Accrington Stanley	Cleethorpes
19:30 GMT	Morris (yellow card) 65'; Smith (yellow card) 89'	Report	Whalley (yellow card) 56'; Leigh 66' (pen.); Rodgers (yellow card) 90'	Stadium: Blundell Park; Attendance: 703; Referee: Martin Coy

13 December 2022 Third round	Burton Albion	2–4	Accrington Stanley	Burton upon Trent
19:00 GMT	Oshilaja 7'; Borthwick-Jackson (yellow card) 20'; Tharme 23' (o.g.); Hughes (yellow card) 61'	Report	Rodgers 20', 68'; Pritchard 41'; Leigh 45+5'	Stadium: Pirelli Stadium; Attendance: 390; Referee: Scott Oldham

10 January 2023 Quarter-final	Lincoln City	2–2 (1–3 p)	Accrington Stanley	Lincoln
19:00 GMT	Hopper 7', 80'; Mandroiu (yellow card) 45+2'; O'Connor (yellow card) 77'; Jackson (yellow card) 83'	Report	Pressley 36', 73' (pen.), (yellow card) 90+3'; Conneely (yellow card) 89'	Stadium: LNER Stadium; Attendance: 2,304; Referee: Simon Mather
	Penalties
	Diamond (penalty scored); Mandroiu (penalty missed); Sanders (penalty missed); Poole (penalty missed)		Pressley (penalty scored); Coyle (penalty scored); Whalley (penalty missed); McConville (penalty scored)

22 February 2023 Semi-final	Accrington Stanley	0–2	Bolton Wanderers	Accrington
20:00 GMT	Pressley (yellow card) 21'; McConville (red card) 22'; Coyle (yellow card) 41'	Report	Trafford (yellow card) 52'; Morley (yellow card) 64', (goal) 84'; Kachunga 82'	Stadium: Wham Stadium; Attendance: 4,874 (2,625 from Bolton); Referee: Sam Barrott
