= Lewis Trickett =

Northern Irish footballer

Personal information
- Full name: Lewis James Trickett
- Date of birth: 27 April 2005 (age 21)
- Place of birth: Accrington, England
- Position: Winger

Team information
- Current team: Clitheroe F.C.

Youth career
- 2015–2023: Accrington Stanley

Senior career*
Years	Team	Apps	(Gls)
2023–2025	Accrington Stanley	6	(0)
- Clitheroe F.C.

International career^{‡}
2022	Northern Ireland U18	3	(1)
- * Club domestic league appearances and goals as of 11:38, 24 July 2025 (UTC) ‡ National team caps and goals as of 16:37, 18 October 2023

Lewis James Trickett (born 27 April 2005) is a Northern Irish professional footballer who plays as a winger.

== Career ==
Having joined his hometown club aged ten, Trickett made his professional debut for Accrington Stanley in October 2022 off the bench in an EFL Trophy tie against Liverpool U21. He signed his first professional contract with the club in July 2023.

On 10 October 2023, he scored his first senior goals with a brace in a 5–3 EFL Trophy victory over Harrogate Town. On 23 December 2023, he made his league debut from the bench in a 2–1 League Two victory over Walsall.

On 9 May 2025, Accrington Stanley announced the player would be leaving when his contract expired in June.

== International career ==
In July 2022, Trickett received a first call up to the Northern Ireland under-18 squad before being called up under-19 squad in September of the same year.

== Career statistics ==
As of match played 23 December 2023

Appearances and goals by club, season and competition
Club	Season	League			FA Cup		League Cup		Other		Total	
Club	Season	Division	Apps	Goals	Apps	Goals	Apps	Goals	Apps	Goals	Apps	Goals
Accrington Stanley	2022–23	League One	0	0	0	0	0	0	1 (Note: Appearance(s) in EFL Trophy)	0	1	0
Accrington Stanley	2023–24	League Two	1	0	0	0	0	0	1	2	2	2
Career total			1	0	0	0	0	0	2	2	3	2
