= Liam Isherwood =

English footballer (born 2002)

Personal information
- Date of birth: 13 July 2002 (age 24)
- Place of birth: Clitheroe, England
- Height: 1.84 m (6 ft 0 in)
- Position: Goalkeeper

Team information
- Current team: Warrington Town

Youth career
- 2014-2020: Accrington Stanley

Senior career*
Years	Team	Apps	(Gls)
2020–2025	Accrington Stanley	5	(0)
2021	→ Stalybridge Celtic (loan)	3	(0)
2023	→ Marine (loan)	2	(0)
2024–2025	→ Clitheroe (loan)	16	(0)
2025–	Warrington Town	34	(0)
- * Club domestic league appearances and goals as of 16:21, 7 July 2025 (UTC)

Liam Isherwood (born 13 July 2002) is an English professional footballer who plays as a goalkeeper for Northern Premier League Premier Division club Warrington Town.

== Playing career ==
Isherwood has been with Accrington Stanley since u12s. On 10 September 2020, Isherwood signed his first professional contract on a one-year deal. On 7 October 2021, Isherwood signed a new one-year contract. In September 2021, Isherwood joined Stalybridge Celtic on loan. On 19 March 2022, he made his debut for Accrington Stanley, coming on for Harvey Rodgers as a 68th-minute substitute following Toby Savin's sending off against Plymouth Argyle. On 26 March 2022, Isherwood made his first start for Accrington Stanley against Gillingham. In February 2023, Isherwood joined Marine on loan for a month.

In December 2024, Isherwood joined NPL Division One West side Clitheroe on an initial one-month loan deal.

On 9 May 2025, Accrington Stanley announced the player would be leaving when his contract expired in June.

In July 2025, Isherwood joined Northern Premier League Premier Division side Warrington Town.

== Career statistics ==
As of end of 2024–25 season

Appearances and goals by club, season and competition
Club	Season	League			FA Cup		EFL Cup		Other		Total	
Club	Season	Division	Apps	Goals	Apps	Goals	Apps	Goals	Apps	Goals	Apps	Goals
Accrington Stanley	2021–22	League One	4	0	0	0	0	0	0	0	4	0
Accrington Stanley	2022–23	League One	1	0	0	0	0	0	0	0	1	0
Accrington Stanley	2023–24	League Two	0	0	0	0	0	0	0	0	0	0
Accrington Stanley	2024–25	League Two	0	0	0	0	0	0	0	0	0	0
Accrington Stanley	Total		5	0	0	0	0	0	0	0	5	0
Stalybridge Celtic (loan)	2021–22	Northern Premier League Premier Division	3	0	0	0	—		0	0	3	0
Marine (loan)	2022–23	Northern Premier League Premier Division	2	0	0	0	—		0	0	2	0
Clitheroe (loan)	2024–25	Northern Premier League Division One West	16	0	0	0	—		0	0	16	0
Career total			26	0	0	0	0	0	0	0	26	0
