= Liam Coyle (footballer, born 1999) =

English footballer

Personal information
- Full name: Liam Christopher Coyle
- Date of birth: 6 December 1999 (age 26)
- Place of birth: Liverpool, England
- Height: 1.75 m (5 ft 9 in)
- Position: Midfielder

Team information
- Current team: Accrington Stanley
- Number: 6

Youth career
- 2009–2021: Liverpool
- 2021: → Bolton Wanderers (loan)

Senior career*
Years	Team	Apps	(Gls)
2021–	Accrington Stanley	130	(2)
- * Club domestic league appearances and goals as of 12:45, 27 September 2026 (UTC)

Liam Christopher Coyle (born 6 December 1999) is an English professional footballer who plays as a midfielder for EFL League Two club Accrington Stanley.

== Club career ==
Coyle began his career with Liverpool at the age of nine, and spent time on loan in Bolton Wanderers's development squad in 2021.

In July 2021 he signed for Accrington Stanley. His debut came on 5 October in a 5–0 win against Leicester City U21 in the EFL Trophy, whilst his league debut came on 13 November in a 1–4 defeat against Plymouth Argyle.

At the end of the 2023–24 season, a contract extension was triggered. He signed a further contract in May 2024.

== International career ==
Coyle was called up to the Northern Ireland U21 in March 2019.

== Career statistics ==
As of match played 26 September 2026

Appearances and goals by club, season and competition
Club	Season	League			FA Cup		League Cup		Other		Total	
Club	Season	Division	Apps	Goals	Apps	Goals	Apps	Goals	Apps	Goals	Apps	Goals
Accrington Stanley	2021–22	League One	19	1	0	0	0	0	3 (Note: Appearance(s) in the EFL Trophy.)	0	22	1
Accrington Stanley	2022–23	League One	33	1	5	0	1	0	6	0	45	1
Accrington Stanley	2023–24	League Two	12	0	0	0	1	0	1	0	14	0
Accrington Stanley	2024–25	League Two	34	0	3	1	1	0	1	0	39	1
Accrington Stanley	2025–26	League Two	24	0	2	0	2	0	1	0	29	0
Accrington Stanley	2026–27	League Two	8	0	0	0	0	0	0	0	8	0
Career total			130	2	10	1	5	0	12	0	157	3
