= Ryan Astley =

Welsh footballer

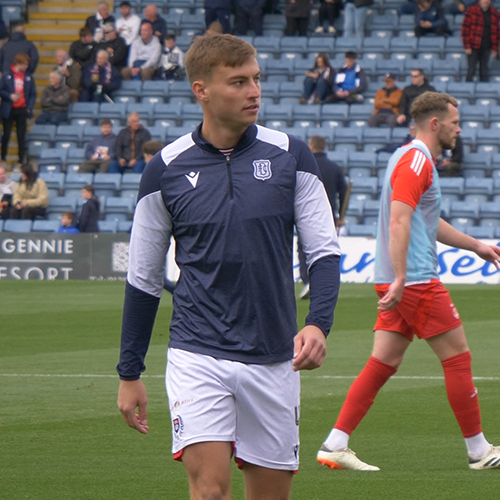
- Astley during a Dundee warm-up in 2024

Personal information
- Full name: Philip Ryan Astley
- Date of birth: 4 October 2001 (age 25)
- Place of birth: Llanfair Caereinion, Wales
- Height: 1.83 m (6 ft 0 in)
- Position: Defender

Team information
- Current team: Dundee
- Number: 4

Youth career
- Everton

Senior career*
Years	Team	Apps	(Gls)
2022–2024	Everton	0	(0)
2022–2023	→ Accrington Stanley (loan)	23	(1)
2024–	Dundee	78	(3)

International career
2017–2018	Wales U17	5	(0)
2018–2019	Wales U19	14	(0)
2021–2022	Wales U21	4	(1)
- * Club domestic league appearances and goals as of 21:45, 21 November 2026 (UTC)

Ryan Astley (born 4 October 2001) is a Welsh professional footballer who plays as a defender for Scottish Premiership club Dundee. He is a former Wales under-21 international.

== Early life ==
Astley is from Llanfair Caereinion.

== Club career ==
Astley began his career with Everton, making his debut for their under-23 team at the age of 16 in 2018, before being offered a new contract in April 2021. He was an unused substitute for their FA Cup match against Boreham Wood in March 2022. Astley moved to Accrington Stanley on loan from Everton in July 2022, and made his professional debut on 6 August 2022, appearing as a substitute.

On 18 January 2024, Astley joined Scottish Premiership side Dundee on a two-and-a-half-year contract for an undisclosed fee. He said that speaking with Owen Beck, with whom he shared an agent, had helped him agree to the move. Astley made his debut for Dundee as a substitute in a league game away to St Mirren.

On 13 July 2024, Astley scored his first goal for Dundee in a 1–7 away victory over Bonnyrigg Rose in the Scottish League Cup group stage.

On 9 August 2025, Astley scored his first league goal for Dundee, in a league draw away to Rangers. On 14 May 2026, Dundee confirmed that Astley had signed a contract extension with the club until 2029.

== International career ==
Astley is a Wales youth international. He has captained the under-21 team, and has trained with the under-23 team.

== Career statistics ==
As of match played 21 November 2026

Appearances and goals by club, season and competition
Club	Season	League			National cup (Note: Includes FA Cup, Scottish Cup)		League cup (Note: Includes EFL Cup, Scottish League Cup)		Other		Total	
Club	Season	Division	Apps	Goals	Apps	Goals	Apps	Goals	Apps	Goals	Apps	Goals
Everton U21	2018–19	—			—		—		1 (Note: Appearances in EFL Trophy)	0	1	0
Everton U21	2019–20	—			—		—		4	0	4	0
Everton U21	2021–22	—			—		—		3	0	3	0
Everton U21	2023–24	—			—		—		2	0	2	0
Everton U21	Total		—		—		—		10	0	10	0
Everton	2022–23	Premier League	0	0	0	0	0	0	—		0	0
Everton	2023–24	Premier League	0	0	0	0	0	0	—		0	0
Everton	Total		0	0	0	0	0	0	0	0	0	0
Accrington Stanley (loan)	2022–23	League One	23	1	3	1	1	1	5	1	32	4
Dundee	2023–24	Scottish Premiership	3	0	0	0	—		0	0	3	0
Dundee	2024–25	Scottish Premiership	26	0	2	0	5	1	0	0	33	1
Dundee	2025–26	Scottish Premiership	36	3	2	0	3	1	0	0	41	4
Dundee	2026–27	Scottish Premiership	13	0	0	0	5	0	0	0	18	0
Dundee	Total		78	3	4	0	13	2	0	0	95	5
Career total			101	4	7	1	14	3	15	1	137	9

== Honours ==
Everton U23

- Premier League Cup: 2018–19
