= Matt Lowe (footballer, born 1996) =

English footballer (born 1996)

Personal information
- Full name: Matthew John Lowe
- Date of birth: 11 March 1996 (age 30)
- Place of birth: Warwick, England
- Height: 1.88 m (6 ft 2 in)
- Position: Midfielder

Team information
- Current team: Brackley Town

Youth career
- Cambridge United

Senior career*
Years	Team	Apps	(Gls)
2014–2016	Cambridge United	0	(0)
2015	→ Wealdstone (loan)	3	(0)
2015	→ Wealdstone (loan)	2	(0)
2016	→ Brackley Town (loan)	19	(1)
2016–2022	Brackley Town	207	(26)
2022–2024	Accrington Stanley	43	(0)
2024–	Brackley Town	82	(16)

International career
2019	England C	1	(0)
- * Club domestic league appearances and goals as of 17:56, 22 March 2026 (UTC)

Matthew John Lowe (born 11 March 1996) is an English professional footballer who plays for National League North club Brackley Town, as a midfielder.

== Career ==
Born in Warwick, Lowe played for Cambridge United, Wealdstone and Brackley Town, before signing for Accrington Stanley in June 2022. He was released by the club at the end of the 2023–24 season. He returned to Brackley Town in the 2024–25 season, and signed a new contract at the end of the season. On 27 May 2026, the club announced he had signed a new one-year deal.

== Career statistics ==
As of match played 28 February 2026

Club statistics
Club	Season	League			National Cup		League Cup		Other		Total	
Club	Season	Division	Apps	Goals	Apps	Goals	Apps	Goals	Apps	Goals	Apps	Goals
Wealdstone (loan)	2015–16	National League North	3	0	1	0	—		—		4	0
Brackley Town (loan)	2015–16	National League North	19	1	0	0	—		—		19	1
Brackley Town	2016–17	National League North	34	1	2	0	—		6 (Note: Appearance(s) in the FA Trophy)	1	42	2
Brackley Town	2017–18	National League North	40	1	2	0	—		12 (Note: Ten Appearances in the FA Trophy and Two Appearances in the 2017–18 National League North play-offs)	1	54	2
Brackley Town	2018–19	National League North	42	3	0	0	—		5 (Note: Four Appearances in the FA Trophy and One Appearance in the 2018–19 National League North play-offs)	1	47	4
Brackley Town	2019–20	National League North	34	8	1	0	—		1 (Note: Appearance in the 2019–20 National League North play-offs)	0	36	8
Brackley Town	2020–21	National League North	16	2	3	1	—		—		19	3
Brackley Town	2021–22	National League North	41	11	2	0	—		2 (Note: One Appearance in the FA Trophy and One Appearance in the 2021–22 National League North play-offs)	0	45	11
Brackley Town	Total		207	26	10	1	0	0	26	2	240	29
Accrington Stanley	2022–23	League One	20	0	0	0	1	0	1 (Note: Appearance(s) in the EFL Trophy)	1	22	1
Accrington Stanley	2023–24	League Two	23	0	2	0	1	0	1	0	27	0
Accrington Stanley	Total		43	0	2	0	2	0	2	1	49	1
Brackley Town	2024–25	National League North	44	13	2	0	–		1	1	47	14
Brackley Town	2025–26	National League	32	2	2	1	–		1	2	35	5
Brackley Town	Total		76	15	4	1	0	0	2	3	82	19
Career totals			348	42	17	2	2	0	30	7	397	51
