= Lewis Shipley =

English footballer (born 2003)

Personal information
- Date of birth: 29 November 2003 (age 22)
- Place of birth: Cambridge, England
- Position: Defender

Team information
- Current team: Barrow
- Number: 3

Youth career
- 2010–2023: Norwich City

Senior career*
Years	Team	Apps	(Gls)
2023–2025	Norwich City	0	(0)
2023–2024	→ Accrington Stanley (loan)	26	(2)
2024–2025	→ Cheltenham Town (loan)	8	(0)
2025–	Barrow	25	(3)
- * Club domestic league appearances and goals as of 17:25, 12 April 2026 (UTC)

Lewis Shipley (born 29 November 2003) is an English professional footballer who plays as a defender for National League club Barrow.

== Career ==
=== Norwich City ===
Born in Cambridge, Shipley began his career with Norwich City at the age of 7, turning professional in October 2021, before moving on loan to Accrington Stanley in July 2023. He suffered an injury after one game and "struggled for game time".

He signed on loan for Cheltenham Town in August 2024. In January 2025 it was announced that Shipley had returned to Norwich City.

On 13 May 2025, Norwich announced he would be leaving the club in June when his contract expired.

=== Barrow ===
On 27 June 2025, Barrow announced they had signed Shipley on a two-year contract. On 16 August 2025, Shipley netted his first Barrow goal, a 97th minute winner against Notts County. He scored a second goal a week later in an away win at Colchester.

== Career statistics ==
As of match played on 11 April 2026

Appearances and goals by club, season and competition
Club	Season	League			FA Cup		EFL Cup		Other		Total	
Club	Season	Division	Apps	Goals	Apps	Goals	Apps	Goals	Apps	Goals	Apps	Goals
Norwich City	2023–24	Championship	0	0	0	0	0	0	0	0	0	0
Norwich City	2024–25	Championship	0	0	0	0	0	0	0	0	0	0
Norwich City	Total		0	0	0	0	0	0	0	0	0	0
Accrington Stanley (loan)	2023–24	League Two	26	2	1	0	0	0	4 (Note: Appearance(s) in the EFL Trophy)	0	31	2
Cheltenham Town (loan)	2024–25	League Two	8	0	0	0	0	0	2	0	10	0
Barrow	2025–26	League Two	25	3	2	0	1	0	3	0	31	3
Career total			59	3	3	0	1	0	9	0	72	5
