= Cody David =

Nigerian footballer (born 2000)

Personal information
- Full name: Korede Yemi David
- Birth name: Korede Yemi Adedoyin
- Date of birth: 14 November 2000 (age 25)
- Place of birth: Lagos, Nigeria
- Height: 1.84 m (6 ft 0 in)
- Position: Winger

Team information
- Current team: FC LNZ Cherkasy
- Number: 99

Youth career
- Everton

Senior career*
Years	Team	Apps	(Gls)
2019–2020	Everton	0	(0)
2019–2020	→ Hamilton Academical (loan)	0	(0)
2020–2022	Sheffield Wednesday	0	(0)
2022–2024	Accrington Stanley	47	(6)
2024–2025	Raith Rovers	8	(1)
2025	IFK Mariehamn	20	(10)
2026	Trenčín	14	(9)
2026–	FC LNZ Cherkasy	0	(0)
- * Club domestic league appearances and goals as of 16 May 2026

Korede Yemi David (né Adedoyin; born 14 November 2000), known as Cody David, is a Nigerian professional footballer who plays as a winger for FC LNZ Cherkasy.

== Career ==
Born in Lagos, Adedoyin began his career with Everton at the age of 10, and moved on loan to Hamilton Academical in July 2019. He returned to Everton in January 2020. On 25 June 2020, it was announced that he would leave the club when his contract expired on 30 June 2020.

In September 2020 he signed for Sheffield Wednesday following a trial period. He suffered a hamstring injury during his first season. He made his senior debut against Newcastle United U21 in the EFL Trophy on 31 August 2021, coming on as a second-half substitute to replace Sylla Sow.

On 1 February 2022, it was confirmed that Adedoyin had joined Accrington Stanley on a permanent deal. He was released by the club at the end of the 2023–24 season.

On 17 October 2024, David joined Scottish Championship club Raith Rovers on a short-term deal until January 2025. He left the club in January 2025.

In March 2025 he signed with IFK Mariehamn in the Finnish Veikkausliiga.

On 6 January 2026, David signed for Slovak First Football League side Trenčín. In July 2026 he signed for FC LNZ Cherkasy.

== Personal life ==
In summer 2024, following the death of his grandfather, Adedoyin changed his surname to his grandfather's first name David.

== Career statistics ==
As of match played 4 January 2025

Appearances and goals by club, season and competition
Club	Season	League			FA Cup		EFL Cup		Other		Total	
Club	Season	Division	Apps	Goals	Apps	Goals	Apps	Goals	Apps	Goals	Apps	Goals
Everton	2019–20	Premier League	0	0	0	0	0	0	0	0	0	0
Hamilton Academical (loan)	2019–20	Scottish Premiership	0	0	0	0	0	0	1 (Note: Appearance in the Scottish League Challenge Cup.)	0	1	0
Sheffield Wednesday	2020–21	Championship	0	0	0	0	0	0	0	0	0	0
Sheffield Wednesday	2021–22	League One	0	0	0	0	0	0	3 (Note: Appearances in the Football League Trophy.)	1	3	1
Sheffield Wednesday	Total		0	0	0	0	0	0	3	1	3	1
Accrington Stanley	2021–22	League One	12	1	0	0	0	0	0	0	12	1
Accrington Stanley	2022–23	League One	19	3	1	0	1	1	2	0	23	4
Accrington Stanley	2023–24	League Two	16	2	2	0	1	0	3	4	22	6
Accrington Stanley	Total		47	6	3	0	2	1	5	4	57	11
Raith Rovers	2024–25	Scottish Championship	8	1	1	0	0	0	0	0	9	1
IFK Mariehamn	2025	Veikkausliiga	0	0	0	0	0	0	–		0	0
Career total			55	7	4	0	2	1	9	5	70	13
