= Connor O'Brien (footballer) =

English footballer (born 2004)

Personal information
- Full name: Connor David O'Brien
- Date of birth: 12 July 2004 (age 22)
- Place of birth: Accrington, England
- Height: 1.82 m (6 ft 0 in)
- Position: Defender

Team information
- Current team: Accrington Stanley
- Number: 38

Youth career
- 2013–2022: Accrington Stanley

Senior career*
Years	Team	Apps	(Gls)
2022–	Accrington Stanley	82	(0)
2022–2023	→ Radcliffe (loan)	20	(2)
2023	→ Farsley Celtic (loan)	6	(0)

International career^{‡}
2024–2025	Republic of Ireland U21	7	(0)
- * Club domestic league appearances and goals as of 17:00, 3 May 2026 (UTC) ‡ National team caps and goals as of 00:20, 18 November 2026 (UTC)

Connor David O'Brien (born 12 July 2004) is an Irish professional footballer who plays as a defender for EFL League Two club Accrington Stanley.

== Club career ==
O'Brien first joined the youth set-up at Accrington Stanley at the age of eight, and went on to captain the under-18s to the fourth round of the FA Youth Cup in 2021–22. He signed his first one-year professional contract in June 2022. On 3 December 2022, he joined Northern Premier League Premier Division club Radcliffe on a one-month loan. He scored on his debut later that day, in a 2–2 draw at Matlock Town. He played a total of seven games for Radcliffe. He made his first-team debut in the English Football League with Accrington after coming on as an 80th-minute substitute for Rosaire Longelo in a 1–1 draw at Port Vale on 7 February 2023. On 13 February 2023, Radcliffe extended his loan by a further 2 months.

On 10 May 2024, O'Brien extended his contract at Accrington Stanley by two years.

== International career ==
O'Brien qualifies for the Republic of Ireland through his father, who hails from Drogheda. He made his debut for the Republic of Ireland U21 side on 7 June 2024, in a 3–2 win away to Croatia U21 in a friendly.

== Career statistics ==
As of match played 7 February 2023

Appearances and goals by club, season and competition
Club	Season	League			FA Cup		EFL Cup		Other		Total	
Club	Season	Division	Apps	Goals	Apps	Goals	Apps	Goals	Apps	Goals	Apps	Goals
Accrington Stanley	2022–23	EFL League One	1	0	0	0	0	0	0	0	1	0
Radcliffe (loan)	2022–23	Northern Premier League; Premier Division	7	1	0	0	0	0	0	0	7	1
Career total			8	1	0	0	0	0	0	0	8	1
