= Dylan Moonan =

English footballer (born 2002)

Personal information
- Date of birth: 4 October 2002 (age 24)
- Place of birth: Wigan, England
- Position: Midfielder

Team information
- Current team: Lancaster City

Youth career
- 2010–2021: Burnley

Senior career*
Years	Team	Apps	(Gls)
2021–2023	Accrington Stanley	1	(0)
2022	→ Stalybridge Celtic (loan)	2	(1)
2022–2023	→ FC United of Manchester (loan)	3	(0)
2023–2024	Atherton Collieries	32	(1)
2024–	Lancaster City	0	(0)
- * Club domestic league appearances and goals as of 12:13, 15 July 2024 (UTC)

Dylan Moonan (born 4 October 2002) is an English professional footballer who plays as a midfielder for Northern Premier League Premier Division club Lancaster City.

== Career ==
Moonan joined the Academy at Burnley at the age of seven. He signed a one-year contract at Accrington Stanley on 5 July 2021, alongside Matty Carson, after the pair impressed on trial. On 31 August, he made his first-team debut for the "Reds", coming on for David Morgan as a 66th-minute substitute in an EFL Trophy tie against Barrow at the Crown Ground; Accrington won 5–4 on penalties following a 2–2 draw.

On 15 October 2022, Moonan joined Northern Premier League Premier Division club Stalybridge Celtic on a one-month loan. He made his debut that day, opening the scoring in an eventual 2–1 defeat to Ashton United.

On 20 May 2023, it was announced Moonan will be leaving the club when his contract ends on 30 June. He subsequently joined Atherton Collieries in August 2023.

In July 2024, Moonan joined Northern Premier League Premier Division side Lancaster City.

== Style of play ==
Moonan is a defensive minded box-to-box midfielder.

== Career statistics ==
As of end of 2023–24 season

Appearances and goals by club, season and competition
Club	Season	League			FA Cup		EFL Cup		Other		Total	
Club	Season	Division	Apps	Goals	Apps	Goals	Apps	Goals	Apps	Goals	Apps	Goals
Accrington Stanley	2021–22	League One	0	0	0	0	0	0	1 (Note: Appearance/s in the EFL Trophy.)	0	1	0
Accrington Stanley	2022–23	League One	1	0	0	0	0	0	1	0	2	0
Accrington Stanley	Total		1	0	0	0	0	0	2	0	3	0
Stalybridge Celtic (loan)	2022–23	NPL Premier Division	2	1	0	0	—		0	0	2	1
FC United of Manchester (loan)	2022–23	NPL Premier Division	3	0	0	0	—		0	0	3	0
Atherton Collieries	2023–24	NPL Division One West	32	1	3	2	—		1 (Note: Appearance(s) in FA Trophy)	0	36	3
Career total			38	2	3	2	0	0	3	0	44	4
