= Benjamin Woods =

New Zealand soldier, police officer and bailiff

Benjamin Woods (c. 1787–1867) was a New Zealand soldier, police officer and bailiff. He was born in King's County, Ireland in about 1787.
