= Harry Perritt =

English footballer

Personal information
- Full name: Harrison Joshua Perritt
- Date of birth: 16 February 2001 (age 25)
- Place of birth: Knowsley, England
- Height: 6 ft 1 in (1.85 m)
- Position: Defender

Team information
- Current team: Southport

Youth career
- –2011: Preston North End
- 2011–2021: Accrington Stanley

Senior career*
Years	Team	Apps	(Gls)
2021–2023	Accrington Stanley	11	(0)
2021	→ Southport (loan)	0	(0)
2021	→ Torquay United (loan)	8	(0)
2022	→ Altrincham (loan)	12	(1)
2023	Altrincham	9	(0)
2023–2026	Alfreton Town	33	(1)
- * Club domestic league appearances and goals as of 11:29, 8 May 2023 (UTC)

Harrison Joshua Perritt (born 16 February 2001) is an English professional footballer who plays as a defender for National League North side Southport.

== Career ==
Born in Knowsley, Perritt started his youth career at Preston North End before switching to Accrington Stanley in 2011 at the age of 11. In July 2019, he signed a one-year professional contract with the club with the option of a further year. His contract was extended at the end of the season. Perritt made his debut for the club on 12 January 2021 in a 4–0 EFL Trophy defeat away to Lincoln City. On 4 February 2021, he joined Southport on a month-long loan. On 20 March 2021, he made his league debut for Accrington as a substitute in a 3–1 League One win over Wigan Athletic.

In October 2021, Perritt joined National League club Torquay United on loan until January 2022. He made 8 appearances on loan at Torquay. On 19 February 2022, Perritt joined National League side Altrincham on loan for the remainder of the 2021–22 season. He scored once in his 12 matches at Altrincham.

In March 2023, Perritt returned to Altrincham on a permanent basis. He was released at the end of the 2022–23 season.

Perritt signed for National League North club Alfreton Town in July 2023. In March 2024, his contract was extended to summer 2025.
