= Toby Savin =

English footballer

Personal information
- Full name: Toby Savin
- Date of birth: 4 May 2001 (age 25)
- Place of birth: Southport, England
- Height: 6 ft 4 in (1.94 m)
- Position: Goalkeeper

Team information
- Current team: Torquay United

Youth career
- 2011-2013: Southport
- 2013–2014: Wigan Athletic
- 2014–2016: Everton
- 2016–2017: Crewe Alexandra
- 2017–2019: Accrington Stanley

Senior career*
Years	Team	Apps	(Gls)
2019–2024	Accrington Stanley	91	(0)
2019–2020	→ Stalybridge Celtic (loan)	1	(0)
2023	→ Stevenage (loan)	4	(0)
2024–2025	Shrewsbury Town	19	(0)
2025	→ Barnet (loan)	2	(0)
2025	→ FC Halifax Town (loan)	1	(0)
2025–2026	Wigan Athletic	0	(0)
2026-	Torquay United	0	(0)
- * Club domestic league appearances and goals as of 18:58, 27 June 2026 (UTC)

Toby Savin (born 4 May 2001) is an English professional footballer who plays as a goalkeeper for National League South club Torquay United.

== Career ==
=== Early career ===
Savin began playing football at Southport before joining Wigan Athletic. After leaving the club in 2014, he was spotted by the academy of Everton before departing to join Crewe Alexandra in 2016. He then joined Accrington Stanley in 2017.

=== Accrington Stanley ===
==== 2019–20 season ====
On 3 September 2019, Savin made his professional debut for Accrington Stanley against Fleetwood Town in the EFL Trophy, starting in goal in a 2–1 victory. At the age of 18 years, 3 months and 30 days, he became the club’s third-youngest goalkeeper.

On 8 October 2019, he recorded his first clean sheet for the club in a 3–0 EFL Trophy win against Oldham Athletic, making five saves in the match.

On 30 December 2019, Savin joined Stalybridge Celtic on loan in order to gain first-team experience. He made one appearance, keeping a clean sheet in a 0–0 draw against Ashton United before being recalled by Accrington Stanley on 10 January 2020 after changes in the goalkeeping situation at both clubs.

He finished the 2019–20 season with two appearances, both in the EFL Trophy, as the third-choice goalkeeper behind Dimitar Evtimov and Josef Bursik.

==== 2020–21 season ====
Savin made his first appearance of the season on 4 September 2020 in the EFL Cup against Burton Albion, starting in goal in a 1–1 draw before Accrington lost on penalties.

On 8 September 2020, he kept a clean sheet in a 7–0 EFL Trophy win over Leeds United U21s.

On 12 September 2020, he made his English Football League debut in League One against Peterborough United, keeping a clean sheet in a 2–0 win. Following this, he established himself as the club’s first-choice goalkeeper during the early part of the season.

On 18 September 2020, he signed a new three-year contract with Accrington Stanley, keeping him at the club until 2023.

In October 2020, Accrington Stanley signed goalkeeper Nathan Baxter on loan, increasing competition for the starting role. Savin subsequently spent periods out of the starting XI but featured in cup matches and during rotation.

On 2 March 2021, Baxter was injured during a League One match against Ipswich Town, allowing Savin to step in and play the remainder of the season as first-choice goalkeeper.

Overall, he made 35 appearances in all competitions during the season, keeping 10 clean sheets as Accrington finished 11th in League One.

==== 2021–22 season ====
Savin began the season as backup to James Trafford, who was on loan from Manchester City.

He made his first appearance on 10 August 2021 in an EFL Cup win against Rotherham United.

On 24 August 2021, he kept a clean sheet in a penalty shootout defeat to Oldham Athletic in the EFL Cup. He later regained his place in the team in September 2021, including a clean sheet in a 1–0 win over Shrewsbury Town.

Trafford eventually returned to Manchester City in January 2022, allowing Savin to continue competing for the starting position.

During the season, Savin made 40 appearances in all competitions, keeping 11 clean sheets as Accrington finished 12th in League One. He also received his first two career red cards in matches against Plymouth Argyle and Lincoln City.

=== Shrewsbury Town ===
On 27 June 2024, Savin joined EFL League One club Shrewsbury Town on a two-year deal.

On 18 February 2025, Savin joined Barnet on an initial one-month loan. On 25 March 2025, he joined FC Halifax Town on loan for the remainder of the season.

=== Wigan Athletic ===
On 1 September 2025, Savin departed Shrewsbury Town and joined League One club Wigan Athletic on a one-year deal.

He was released upon the expiry of his deal at the end of the 2025–26 season.

=== Torquay United ===
On 27 June 2026, Savin agreed to join National League South club Torquay United.

== Career statistics ==
As of end of 2025–26 season

Appearances and goals by club, season and competition
Club	Season	League			FA Cup		EFL Cup		Other		Total	
Club	Season	Division	Apps	Goals	Apps	Goals	Apps	Goals	Apps	Goals	Apps	Goals
Accrington Stanley	2019–20	League One	0	0	0	0	0	0	2 (Note: Appearances in EFL Trophy)	0	2	0
Accrington Stanley	2020–21	League One	31	0	0	0	1	0	3	0	35	0
Accrington Stanley	2021–22	League One	33	0	1	0	2	0	4	0	40	0
Accrington Stanley	2022–23	League One	18	0	5	0	0	0	2	0	23	0
Accrington Stanley	2023–24	League Two	9	0	0	0	1	0	0	0	10	0
Accrington Stanley	Total		91	0	6	0	4	0	11	0	112	0
Stalybridge Celtic (loan)	2019–20	NPL Premier Division	1	0	—		—		—		1	0
Stevenage (loan)	2022–23	League Two	4	0	—		—		—		4	0
Shrewsbury Town	2024–25	League One	19	0	1	0	2	0	3	0	25	0
Shrewsbury Town	2025–26	League Two	2	0	0	0	0	0	0	0	2	0
Shrewsbury Town	Total		21	0	1	0	2	0	3	0	27	0
Barnet (loan)	2024–25	National League	2	0	—		—		—		2	0
FC Halifax Town (loan)	2024–25	National League	1	0	—		—		—		1	0
Wigan Athletic	2025–26	League One	0	0	0	0	0	0	2	0	2	0
Career total			120	0	7	0	6	0	16	0	149	0
