= Baba Fernandes =

Bissau-Guinean footballer

Personal information
- Date of birth: 3 July 2000 (age 26)
- Place of birth: Bissau, Guinea-Bissau
- Height: 1.88 m (6 ft 2 in)
- Position: Centre back

Youth career
- 2014–2016: Real
- 2016–2020: Vitória Setúbal
- 2020–2022: Nottingham Forest

Senior career*
Years	Team	Apps	(Gls)
2018–2020	Vitória Setúbal	0	(0)
2021–2022	Nottingham Forest	0	(0)
2022–2024	Accrington Stanley	18	(0)

International career
2016	Portugal U17	2	(0)
2023–	Guinea-Bissau	1	(0)
- * Club domestic league appearances and goals as of 09:58, 8 May 2023 (UTC)

Baba Fernandes (born 3 July 2000) is a Bissau-Guinean professional footballer who played for Accrington Stanley as a defender. A former youth international for Portugal, he plays for the Guinea-Bissau national team.

== Club career ==
On 28 December 2018, Fernandes made his professional debut with Vitória Setúbal in a 2018–19 Taça da Liga match against Braga. On 10 June 2022, Nottingham Forest announced Fernandes would be leaving the club once his contract expired.

In August 2022 he signed for Accrington Stanley. On 30 April 2024, it was announced Fernandes will be leaving the club at the end of his contract.

== International career ==
In August 2023 he was called up to the Guinea-Bissau squad.
