= Jay Rich-Baghuelou =

Australian soccer player

Personal information
- Full name: Jay Noah Rich-Baghuelou
- Date of birth: 22 October 1999 (age 27)
- Place of birth: Sydney, Australia
- Height: 1.96 m (6 ft 5 in)
- Position: Defender

Youth career
- Gold Coast City
- 2018: Fulham

Senior career*
Years	Team	Apps	(Gls)
2018–2019	Dulwich Hamlet	8	(0)
2019–2020	Welling United	21	(0)
2020–2022	Crystal Palace	0	(0)
2022–2025	Accrington Stanley	33	(2)

International career
2021–2022	Australia U23	5	(1)
- * Club domestic league appearances and goals as of 24 July 2025

Jay Noah Rich-Baghuelou (born 22 October 1999) is an Australian professional soccer player who plays as a defender.

== Club career ==
He played for Gold Coast City in the National Premier Leagues Queensland before moving to Britain whilst still a teenager. Initially, he played as a striker but was converted into central defence whilst appearing for Dulwich Hamlet. He also turned out for Welling United before earning a trial and subsequent contract at Crystal Palace, after being scouted by Palace's Shaun Derry. Whilst at Crystal Palace he has captained their under-23 team.

On 14 January 2022, Rich-Baghuelou joined EFL League One side Accrington Stanley for an undisclosed fee.

On 8 August 2022, during Accrington’s 1–0 victory over Shrewsbury Town, Rich-Baghuelou sustained a serious ankle injury that forced him off after just 21 minutes. He would ultimately be ruled out for the remainder of the 2022–23 season, after a scan revealed the extent of the damage. Rich-Baghuelou returned to action on the opening day of the 2023–24 EFL League Two season on 6 August 2023, featuring in Stanley’s 3–0 win against Newport County.

On 12 September 2023, he signed a new two-year deal with Accrington, extending his stay with the club until June 2025.

On 9 May 2025, the club announced the player would be leaving when his contract expired in June.

== International career ==
In July 2021 Rich-Baghuelou was called up to the Australia national under-23 soccer team competing at the delayed 2020 Summer Games in Tokyo. Prior to that announcement he had started all three games the Olyroos played as Olympic warm up whilst in Spain in June 2021.

Rich-Baghuelou made his Olympic debut on 28 July 2021 against Egypt. He was part of the Tokyo 2020 Olympics Olyroos squad. The team beat Argentina in their first group match but were unable to win another match. They were therefore not in medal contention.
