= Clitheroe F.C. =

Association football club in England

- Full name: Clitheroe Football Club
- Nickname: The Blues
- Founded: 1877
- Ground: The Loom Loft Stadium
- Capacity: 2,200
- Chairman: Danny Wilkins
- Manager: Sean McConville
- League: Northern Premier League West Division (Step 4)
- 2025–26: Northern Premier League Division One West, 15th of 22
Home colours	Away colours

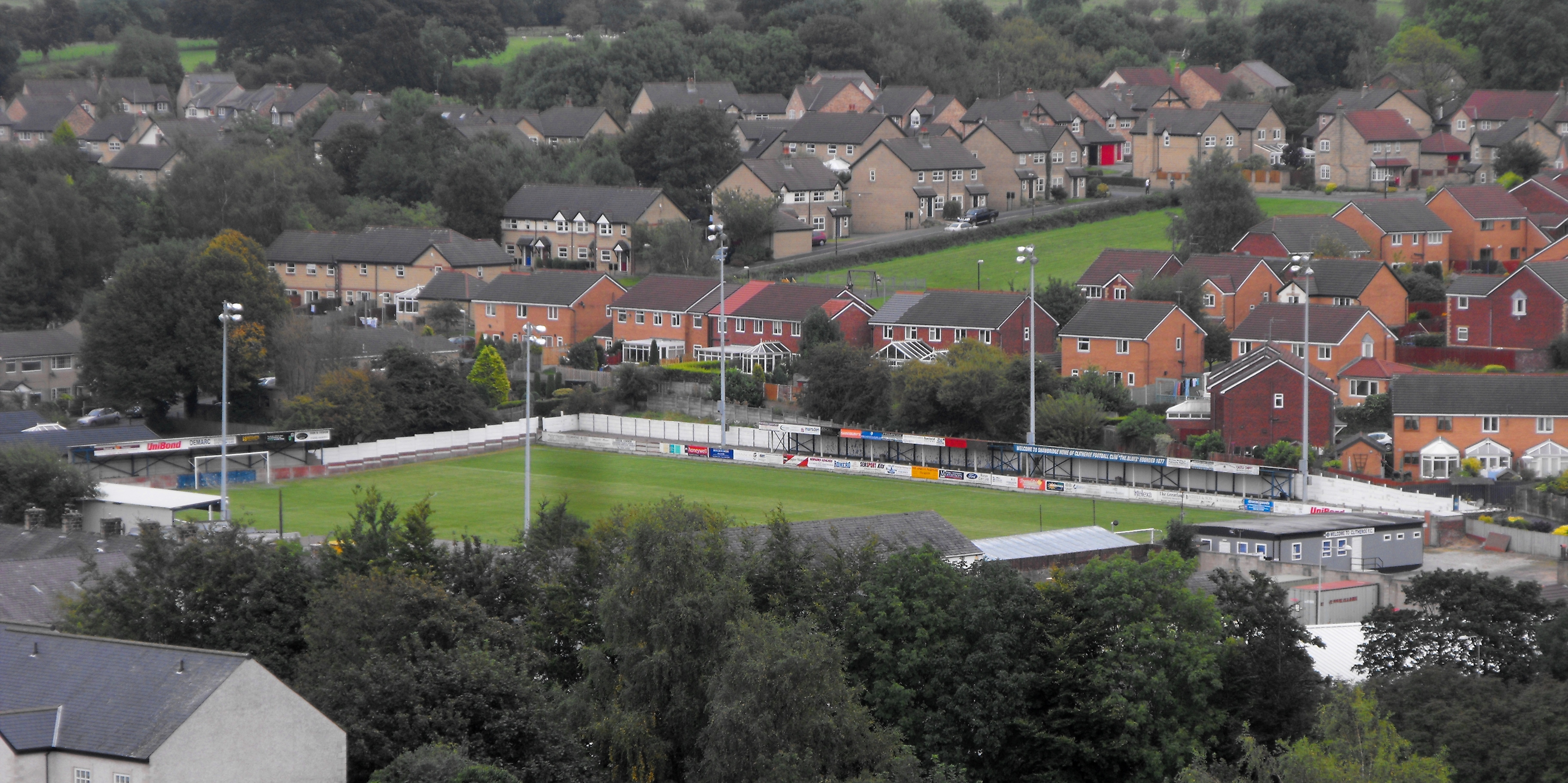
Clitheroe F.C. ground at EcoGiants Stadium in 2009

Clitheroe Football Club is an English football club based in Clitheroe, Lancashire, currently playing in the Northern Premier League Division One West.

== History ==
=== 20th century ===
The club was founded in 1924, and, after a season in the North-East Lancashire Combination, joined the Lancashire Combination for the 1925–26 season. Clitheroe remained there until the end of the 1981–82 season. They won the Lancashire Combination Cup in the 1934–35 season and the League Championship in the 1979–80 season.

For the 1982–83 season the Lancashire Combination amalgamated with the Cheshire County League to become the North West Counties League. Clitheroe became one of the founder members, however the state of the ground meant they started in the third division. There then followed one of the most successful periods in the club's long history when under the guidance of manager Eric Whalley, they won the Third, Second and First Divisions in consecutive seasons, as well as securing the Lancashire Cup in 1985.

In the 1995–96 season when under the joint managership of Dennis Underwood and Gary Butcher they played at Wembley Stadium in the final of the FA Vase. Some 7,500 people watched the game against Brigg Town and although Clitheroe won against them earlier in the season in the FA Cup the club was beaten 3–0 in the Vase Final. A public appeal to help with the visit to Wembley saw £7,400 donated by townspeople and businesses.

The last decade of the 20th century saw most of the ten years spent getting the ground up to scratch with £130,000 being spent in the process. The sale of two players, Jon Penman and Carlo Nash, helped considerably with the expenditure on the ground. The club saw little success on the pitch after the Wembley visit until manager Steve Parry led them to the Floodlight Trophy by beating Kidsgrove Athletic 2–1 in the 1998–99 final.

=== 21st century ===
Dave Burgess took over the management of the first team in 2000–01 after several successful years running the second string, with player Lee Sculpher as his assistant. In their first season they finished as league runners-up and FA Vase semi-finalists.

Work commitments led to Burgess standing down in 2001–02. Sculpher took over and again finished as league runners-up before losing 2–1 to Mossley in the League Cup final at Bury's Gigg Lane ground.

Early cup exits the following season enabled the Blues to concentrate on the league and their away form saw the 2003–04 NWCFL championship won on the final day of the season with a 3–2 victory at Nantwich Town – a late goal from Neil Reynolds sealing the title, the trophy lifted by captain Adam Gardner and club stalwart Keith Lord. With the title came the reward of promotion to the Northern Premier League for the 2004–05 season.

=== Northern Premier League ===
In November 2004 Lee Sculpher resigned as manager and short spells in charge by Paul Byron, Tommy Lawson and Mark Smitheringale followed before Chris Stammers was appointed manager in September 2006. After the 10–1 loss to Kettering Town in the FA Trophy, Stammers tendered his resignation stating that he had taken the club as far as he could. His assistant Ash Berry took temporary charge of team affairs before the club appointed Neil Reynolds and Kendal's veteran player Peter Smith as the new management team in December. Smith took over sole managerial duties at the end of the 2008–09 season, going on to lead the club to 8th (2009–10) and 6th (2010–11) place finishes, the highest league placings in the club's history to date.

The end of the 2010–11 season saw Pete Smith replaced as manager by Carl Garner, club chairman of four years' standing. The vacant position of chair was taken over by Garner's long-standing deputy Anne Barker, who remains in the role. Early success for Garner in 2011-12 (including the Manager of the Month award) was followed by a tailing off in form. He resigned with ten games to go, Dave Burgess and Lee Sculpher returning on a temporary basis to see the season out.

Paul Moore took over the reins in 2012–13, leading Clitheroe to their record points haul and an 8th-place finish. In contrast, a poor start to the 2013–14 season, with early exits from the FA Cup and Trophy, saw Moore replaced by ex-Blue Simon Garner, son of former chairman/manager Carl. With his assistant (and another ex-Blue) Ryan Parr, Garner secured safety with a 17th-place finish, improving on this for 2014–15 with 13th place and an appearance in the Lancashire Challenge Trophy final (a 3–0 defeat to Chorley). The good work continued into 2015-16 when a strong playoff push only faltered in the closing weeks of the season, resulting in a creditable 7th-place finish. Garner and Parr stood down at the season's end, citing family reasons.

In April 2016, Simon Haworth was appointed manager, assisted by Gareth Roberts, with coaches Ian Johnson and Irfan Kawri. In May 2017 the management team were joined by Ben Kay, former joint manager at Ashton Athletic. In June 2017, Gareth Roberts left the role of Assistant Manager to join Skelmersdale United.

== Current squad ==
As of 25 August 2026

Note: Flags indicate national team as defined under FIFA eligibility rules; some limited exceptions apply. Players may hold more than one non-FIFA nationality.

No.	Pos.	Nation	Player
—	GK	ENG	Liam Isherwood
—	GK	ENG	Rhys Kershaw
—	DF	IRL	Jake Carroll
—	DF	ENG	Brad Ditch
—	DF	GBS	Baba Fernandes
—	DF	ENG	Max Harrison
—	DF	ENG	Sean Newton
—	DF	ENG	Maine Walder
—	DF	ENG	Jordan Windass
—	MF	ENG	Rio Alston
—	MF	ENG	Josh Briggs
—	MF	IRL	Jordan Carroll

No.	Pos.	Nation	Player
—	MF	ENG	Jenson Carter
—	MF	ENG	Ross Dent
—	MF	ENG	Joey Holden
—	MF	ENG	Freddie Machell (on loan from Bury)
—	MF	ENG	Demitrius Rhami
—	MF	ENG	Nathan Sanderson
—	MF	ENG	Jackson Shorrocks
—	MF	ENG	Danny Wilkins
—	FW	ENG	Jason Gilchrist
—	FW	ENG	Harry Scarborough
—	FW	ESP	Alhagi Touray Sisay

== Honours ==
- Lancashire FA Challenge Trophy
  - Winners: 1984–85
- Lancashire Combination Division Two
  - Champions: 1959–60
- Lancashire Combination Division One
  - Champions: 1979–80
- North West Counties Football League Division Three
  - Champions: 1983–84
- North West Counties Football League Division Two
  - Champions: 1984–85
- North West Counties Football League Division One
  - Champions: 1985–86, 2003–04
- North West Counties Floodlit Trophy
  - Winners: 1998–99

== Records ==
- Best FA Cup performance: Third Qualifying Round 1959–60, 1965–66, 1967–68, 2007–08, 2022–23
- Best FA Trophy performance: Fourth Round 2025–26
- Best FA Vase performance: Finalists 1995–96, Semi-finalists 2000–01
- Record attendance: 2,375 v Bury

6th April 2026. League game.

- Record transfer: £45,000 for Carlo Nash to Crystal Palace
