= 2025–26 EFL Trophy =

Tournament details
- Country: England; Wales
- Teams: 64

Final positions
- Champions: Luton Town (2nd title)
- Runners-up: Stockport County

Tournament statistics
- Matches played: 127
- Goals scored: 475 (3.74 per match)
- Top goal scorer(s): (England) Billy Sharp (Doncaster Rovers) (6 goals)

The 2025–26 EFL Trophy, known as the Vertu Trophy for sponsorship reasons, was the 45th season in the history of the competition, and was a knock-out tournament for clubs in EFL League One and League Two, the third and fourth tiers of the English football league system, as well as the "Academy teams" of 16 Premier League teams.

The defending champions were Peterborough United, who defeated Birmingham City 2–0 in the previous season's final, but they were knocked out of round of 32 by Swindon Town. They had won two consecutive EFL Trophy finals, after beating Wycombe Wanderers in the 2024 final and were the first team to retain the trophy.

== Participating clubs ==
- 48 clubs from League One and League Two.
- 16 invited Category One Academy teams.

	League One	League Two	Academies
Clubs	AFC Wimbledon; Barnsley; Blackpool; Bolton Wanderers; Bradford City; Burton Albion; Cardiff City; Doncaster Rovers; Exeter City; Huddersfield Town; Leyton Orient; Lincoln City; Luton Town; Mansfield Town; Northampton Town; Peterborough United; Plymouth Argyle; Port Vale; Reading; Rotherham United; Stevenage; Stockport County; Wigan Athletic; Wycombe Wanderers	Accrington Stanley; Barnet; Barrow; Bristol Rovers; Bromley; Cambridge United; Cheltenham Town; Chesterfield; Colchester United; Crawley Town; Crewe Alexandra; Fleetwood Town; Gillingham; Grimsby Town; Harrogate Town; Milton Keynes Dons; Newport County; Notts County; Oldham Athletic; Salford City; Shrewsbury Town; Swindon Town; Tranmere Rovers; Walsall	Arsenal; Aston Villa; Brighton & Hove Albion; Chelsea; Crystal Palace; Everton; Fulham; Leeds United; Liverpool; Manchester City; Manchester United; Newcastle United; Nottingham Forest; Tottenham Hotspur; West Ham United; Wolverhampton Wanderers
Total	24	24	16

== Eligibility criteria for players ==
For EFL clubs

- Minimum of four qualifying outfield players in their starting XI. A qualifying outfield player was one who met any of the following requirements:
  - Any player who started the previous or following first-team fixture.
  - Any player who is in the top 10 players at the club who has made the most starting appearances in league and domestic cup competitions this season.
  - Any player with forty or more first-team starting appearances in their career, including International matches.
  - Any player on loan from a Premier League club or any EFL Category One Academy club.
- A club can play any eligible goalkeeper in the competition.
- Any player out on a long loan term at a National League, National League North, or National League South team can play as long as the loaning team agree to allow the player to return for the match.

For invited teams

- Minimum of six players in the starting line-up who are aged under 21 on 30 June 2025.
- Maximum of two players on the team sheet who are aged over 21 and have also made forty or more senior appearances.

== Competition format ==
Group stage

- Sixteen groups of four teams will be organised on a regionalised basis.
- All groups will include one invited club.
- All clubs will play each other once, either home or away (academy sides will play all group matches away from home).
- Clubs will be awarded three points for a win and one point for a draw.
- In the event of a drawn game (after 90 minutes), a penalty shoot-out will be held with the winning team earning an additional point.
- Clubs expelled from the EFL will be knocked out of the tournament automatically.
- The top two teams in each group will progress to the knockout stage.
- In an Event of which group stage match has been postponed, the Postponed Group stage match will be rescheduled to a no further date than the second Tuesday of November 2025.

Knockout stage

- The Round of 32, the Round of 16 and the quarterfinals of the competition will be drawn on a regionalised basis, even with the reinstated teams.
- In Round 2, the group winners will be seeded and the group runners-up will be unseeded in the draw.
- Semi-final pairings are determined by means of an unseeded draw with no regionalisation.

== Group stage ==
The group stage draw was announced on 24 June 2025, with the Academy teams being drawn on 25 June 2025.

=== Northern section ===
==== Group A ====
Pos	Div	Team	Pld	W	PW	PL	L	GF	GA	GD	Pts	Qualification
1	L2	Salford City	3	3	0	0	0	9	3	+6	9	Advance to Round 2
2	L1	Stockport County	3	1	1	0	1	7	7	0	5	Advance to Round 2
3	ACA	Wolverhampton Wanderers U21	3	1	0	0	2	7	10	−3	3	
4	L1	Wigan Athletic	3	0	0	1	2	2	5	−3	1	

Source: EFL

2 September 2025	Stockport County	5–3	Wolverhampton Wanderers U21	Stockport
19:00 BST	Lowe 20', 24'; Bailey 52'; Astles 79', 83'	Report	Edozie 9'; Mané 12'; Okoduwa 57'	Stadium: Edgeley Park; Attendance: 1,014; Referee: Rob Ellis

2 September 2025	Wigan Athletic	0–2	Salford City	Wigan
19:00 BST		Report	Turton 50'; Stockton 81'	Stadium: Brick Community Stadium; Attendance: 1,983; Referee: Richard Eley

7 October 2025	Salford City	3–1	Stockport County	Salford
19:00 BST	Austerfield 34'; Bird 55' (pen.); Cesay 70'	Report	Bailey 85'	Stadium: Moor Lane; Attendance: 1,429; Referee: Jamie O'Connor

7 October 2025	Wigan Athletic	1–2	Wolverhampton Wanderers U21	Wigan
19:00 BST	Asamoah 29'	Report	Edozie 11'; Mane 88' (pen.)	Stadium: Brick Community Stadium; Attendance: 1,324; Referee: Zac Kennard-Kettle

11 November 2025	Salford City	4–2	Wolverhampton Wanderers U21	Salford
19:01 GMT	Padovani 40'; Stockton 59'; Butt 77', 82'		Holman 9'; Lopes 90+2'	Stadium: Moor Lane; Attendance: 494; Referee: Andrew Miller

11 November 2025	Stockport County	1–1 (6–5 p)	Wigan Athletic	Stockport
19:01 GMT	O'Keeffe 32'		Costelloe 39'	Stadium: Edgeley Park; Attendance: 1,337; Referee: Scott Oldham
	Penalties
	Fiorini (penalty scored); Dodgson (penalty scored); Fevrier (penalty scored); Moxon (penalty missed); O'Keeffe (penalty scored); Addai (penalty scored); Cina (penalty scored)		(penalty scored) Murray; (penalty scored) Kerr; (penalty scored) Aimson; (penalty scored) Costelloe; (penalty missed) Fox; (penalty scored) Bettoni; (penalty missed) Weir

==== Group B ====
Pos	Div	Team	Pld	W	PW	PL	L	GF	GA	GD	Pts	Qualification
1	L2	Tranmere Rovers	3	2	1	0	0	6	4	+2	8	Advance to Round 2
2	L1	Blackpool	3	2	0	0	1	8	3	+5	6	Advance to Round 2
3	L2	Barrow	3	1	0	0	2	3	7	−4	3	
4	ACA	Nottingham Forest U21	3	0	0	1	2	3	6	−3	1	

Source: EFL

9 September 2025	Tranmere Rovers	2–2 (9–8 p)	Nottingham Forest U21	Birkenhead
19:00 BST	Turnbull 17'; Davison 59'	Report	Smith 2'; Thompson 88'	Stadium: Prenton Park; Attendance: 899; Referee: Rob Ellis
	Penalties
	Patrick (penalty scored); Smallwood (penalty scored); Jennings (penalty scored); Whitaker (penalty scored); Harris (penalty missed); Davison (penalty missed); Lowe (penalty scored); Norman (penalty scored); Brough (penalty scored); Smith (penalty scored); Barrett (penalty scored)		(penalty scored) Abbott; (penalty scored) Sillah; (penalty missed) McClure; (penalty scored) Newton; (penalty scored) Sinclair; (penalty missed) Nwosu; (penalty scored) K. Thompson; (penalty scored) Smith; (penalty scored) J. Thompson; (penalty scored) Hanks; (penalty missed) Campbell

16 September 2025	Blackpool	5–0	Barrow	Blackpool
19:00 BST	Banks 7', 77'; Fletcher 12'; Lyons 49'; Taylor 73'	Report		Stadium: Bloomfield Road; Attendance: 1,087; Referee: Gareth Rhodes

7 October 2025	Barrow	1–2	Tranmere Rovers	Barrow-in-Furness
19:30 BST	Newby 8'	Report	Whitaker 22', 80'	Stadium: Holker Street; Attendance: 581; Referee: William Davis

14 October 2025	Blackpool	2–1	Nottingham Forest U21	Blackpool
19:00 BST	Hansson 6'; Bowler 75'		Thompson 45'	Stadium: Bloomfield Road; Attendance: 960; Referee: Peter Wright

28 October 2025	Barrow	2–0	Nottingham Forest U21	Barrow-in-Furness
19:00 BST	Worrall 61'; Cameron 90+1'			Stadium: Holker Street; Attendance: 441; Referee: Thomas Parsons

11 November 2025	Tranmere Rovers	2–1	Blackpool	Birkenhead
19:01 GMT	Brough 24'; Ironside 75'		Banks 18'	Stadium: Prenton Park; Attendance: 1,082; Referee: Declan Brown

==== Group C ====
Pos	Div	Team	Pld	W	PW	PL	L	GF	GA	GD	Pts	Qualification
1	L1	Doncaster Rovers	3	3	0	0	0	8	2	+6	9	Advance to Round 2
2	L1	Bradford City	3	2	0	0	1	8	5	+3	6	Advance to Round 2
3	L2	Grimsby Town	3	1	0	0	2	6	8	−2	3	
4	ACA	Everton U21	3	0	0	0	3	5	12	−7	0	

Source: EFL

2 September 2025	Bradford City	2–1	Grimsby Town	Bradford
19:30 BST	Cook 76', 90+5'	Report	Rose 45+3'	Stadium: Valley Parade; Attendance: 4,771; Referee: Paul Marsden

2 September 2025	Doncaster Rovers	2–1	Everton U21	Doncaster
19:30 BST	Hanlan 7'; Sbarra 90+4'	Report	Clarke 90+2'	Stadium: Keepmoat Stadium; Attendance: 1,755; Referee: Jamie O'Connor

7 October 2025	Grimsby Town	0–3	Doncaster Rovers	Cleethorpes
19:00 BST		Report	Gotts 7', 14'; McJannet 90' (o.g.)	Stadium: Blundell Park; Attendance: 1,511; Referee: Scott Oldham

14 October 2025	Bradford City	5–1	Everton U21	Bradford
19:30 BST	Kavanagh 7'; Humphrys 14', 21'; Lapslie 41'; Pattinson 86'		Wright 73' (o.g.)	Stadium: Valley Parade; Attendance: 4,170; Referee: James Oldham

4 November 2025	Grimsby Town	5–3	Everton U21	Cleethorpes
19:30 GMT	Walker 40', 58'; Oduor 45+2'; Gilsenan 52'; Staunton 87'		Beaumont-Clark 21'; Tamen 63'; Morgan 90+2'	Stadium: Blundell Park; Attendance: 404; Referee: Michael Barlow

11 November 2025	Doncaster Rovers	3–1	Bradford City	Doncaster
19:01 GMT	Gibson 64', 78'; Hanlan 70'		Wright 39'	Stadium: Keepmoat Stadium; Attendance: 2,085; Referee: Steven Copeland

==== Group D ====
Pos	Div	Team	Pld	W	PW	PL	L	GF	GA	GD	Pts	Qualification
1	L1	Lincoln City	3	3	0	0	0	8	0	+8	9	Advance to Round 2
2	L1	Barnsley	3	1	0	0	2	6	6	0	3	Advance to Round 2
3	ACA	Manchester United U21	3	1	0	0	2	4	8	−4	3	
4	L2	Notts County	3	1	0	0	2	2	6	−4	3	

Source: EFL

2 September 2025	Lincoln City	3–0	Notts County	Lincoln
19:00 BST	Bradley 8'; House 58'; Collins 76'	Report		Stadium: Sincil Bank; Attendance: 2,526; Referee: Greg Rollason

30 September 2025	Lincoln City	3–0	Manchester United U21	Lincoln
19:00 BST	Hamer 47'; Ring 67'; Hackett-Fairchild 88'	Report		Stadium: Sincil Bank; Attendance: 3,347; Referee: Jamie O'Connor

30 September 2025	Notts County	2–1	Barnsley	Nottingham
19:00 BST	Luker 9'; Hall 89'	Report	Kellior-Dunn 50'	Stadium: Meadow Lane; Attendance: 1,822; Referee: Peter Wright

21 October 2025	Barnsley	5–2	Manchester United U21	Barnsley
19:00 BST	McGoldrick 43' (pen.), 51', 62'; Farrugia 74'; Russell 79'		J Fletcher 7'; Obi 53'	Stadium: Oakwell; Attendance: 1,528; Referee: William Davis

4 November 2025	Notts County	0–2	Manchester United U21	Nottingham
19:00 GMT			Lacey 29'; Devaney 54'	Stadium: Meadow Lane; Attendance: 2,735; Referee: Jamie O'Connor

11 November 2025	Barnsley	0–2	Lincoln City	Barnsley
19:01 GMT			Okoronkwo 29'; Collins 61'	Stadium: Oakwell; Attendance: 1,202; Referee: Jacob Miles

==== Group E ====
Pos	Div	Team	Pld	W	PW	PL	L	GF	GA	GD	Pts	Qualification
1	L1	Bolton Wanderers	3	3	0	0	0	10	2	+8	9	Advance to Round 2
2	L1	Rotherham United	3	2	0	0	1	7	5	+2	6	Advance to Round 2
3	ACA	Manchester City U21	3	1	0	0	2	7	8	−1	3	
4	L2	Oldham Athletic	3	0	0	0	3	5	14	−9	0	

Source: EFL

26 August 2025	Oldham Athletic	1–5	Manchester City U21	Oldham
19:00 BST	Hannant 52'	Report	Sangaré 38', 69'; Oboavwoduo 42'; Muir 45+2', 83'	Stadium: Boundary Park; Attendance: 1,753; Referee: Steven Copeland

2 September 2025	Bolton Wanderers	1–0	Rotherham United	Horwich
19:00 BST	Gale 37'	Report		Stadium: Toughsheet Community Stadium; Attendance: 2,063; Referee: Andrew Humphries

23 September 2025	Bolton Wanderers	3–0	Manchester City U21	Horwich
19:00 BST	Dalby 9'; McAtee 14'; Morley 23'	Report		Stadium: Toughsheet Community Stadium; Attendance: 2,763; Referee: Dale Baines

7 October 2025	Rotherham United	3–2	Oldham Athletic	Rotherham
19:00 BST	Spence 52'; Leake 87' (o.g.); James 90+1'	Report	Hannant 1'; Ogle 36'	Stadium: New York Stadium; Attendance: 1,310; Referee: Aaron Bannister

28 October 2025	Rotherham United	4–2	Manchester City U21	Rotherham
19:00 GMT	McWilliams 55' (pen.); Ayres 57'; Powell 66'; Raggett 69'		Sangaré 3'; Gray 36'	Stadium: New York Stadium; Attendance: 1,415; Referee: Jamie O'Connor

11 November 2025	Oldham Athletic	2–6	Bolton Wanderers	Oldham
19:01 GMT	Drummond 78'; Morris 88'		Osei-Tutu 44'; McAtee 48'; Forss 63', 65'; Ritchie 80'; Dalby 83'	Stadium: Boundary Park; Attendance: 2,392; Referee: Greg Rollason

==== Group F ====
Pos	Div	Team	Pld	W	PW	PL	L	GF	GA	GD	Pts	Qualification
1	L2	Harrogate Town	3	3	0	0	0	5	1	+4	9	Advance to Round 2
2	L1	Huddersfield Town	3	2	0	0	1	9	4	+5	6	Advance to Round 2
3	ACA	Newcastle United U21	3	0	1	0	2	5	11	−6	2	
4	L1	Mansfield Town	3	0	0	1	2	3	6	−3	1	

Source: EFL

2 September 2025	Huddersfield Town	6–2	Newcastle United U21	Huddersfield
19:45 BST	Whatmough 8'; Harness 13' (pen.); Castledine 45+4'; Taylor 47', 51'; McArthur 52' (o.g.)	Report	Neave 45+3'; Charlton 76'	Stadium: Kirklees Stadium; Attendance: 1,280; Referee: Scott Jackson

9 September 2025	Mansfield Town	0–1	Harrogate Town	Mansfield
19:45 BST		Report	Bennett 2' (pen.)	Stadium: Field Mill; Attendance: 1,275; Referee: Peter Wright

30 September 2025	Harrogate Town	1–0	Huddersfield Town	Harrogate
19:00 BST	Taylor 11'	Report		Stadium: Wetherby Road; Attendance: 2,262; Referee: Zac Kennard-Kettle

15 October 2025	Mansfield Town	2–2 (3–5 p)	Newcastle United U21	Mansfield
19:45 BST	Dickov 24'; Flanagan 67'		Hefferman 4'; Taylor 90+2' (o.g.)	Stadium: Field Mill; Attendance: 1,180; Referee: Matthew Corlett
	Penalties
	McLaughlin (penalty scored); Dwyer (penalty missed); Moriah-Welsh (penalty scored); Lewis (penalty scored)		(penalty scored) Neave; (penalty scored) Alabi; (penalty scored) Brayson; (penalty scored) Park; (penalty scored) McArthur

4 November 2025	Huddersfield Town	3–1	Mansfield Town	Huddersfield
19:45 GMT	Charles 3', 84'; Feeney 34'		Dwyer 46'	Stadium: Kirklees Stadium; Attendance: 973; Referee: Paul Howard

11 November 2025	Harrogate Town	3–1	Newcastle United U21	Harrogate
19:01 GMT	Taylor 12'; Cursons 64', 78'		Harrison 45+4'	Stadium: Wetherby Road; Attendance: 1,469; Referee: Richard Aspinall

==== Group G ====
Pos	Div	Team	Pld	W	PW	PL	L	GF	GA	GD	Pts	Qualification
1	L1	Port Vale	3	2	0	1	0	9	4	+5	7	Advance to Round 2
2	L2	Fleetwood Town	3	1	2	0	0	9	5	+4	7	Advance to Round 2
3	L2	Accrington Stanley	3	1	0	1	1	5	6	−1	4	
4	ACA	Leeds United U21	3	0	0	0	3	3	11	−8	0	

Source: EFL

2 September 2025	Fleetwood Town	2–2 (5–4 p)	Accrington Stanley	Fleetwood
19:00 BST	Norwood 37'; Ennis 75'	Report	Heath 3'; Henderson 32'	Stadium: Highbury Stadium; Attendance: 550; Referee: Peter Wright
	Penalties
	W. Davies (penalty missed); J. Davies (penalty scored); Helm (penalty scored); Ennis (penalty missed); Norwood (penalty scored); Devonport (penalty scored); Johnson (penalty scored)		(penalty missed) Madden; (penalty missed) Woods; (penalty scored) Popoola; (penalty scored) Caton; (penalty scored) Heath; (penalty scored) Love; (penalty missed) Sinclair

2 September 2025	Port Vale	4–1	Leeds United U21	Stoke-on-Trent
19:45 BST	Paton 23'; Shorrock 34'; Curtis 63'; Faal 86'	Report	McDonald 12'	Stadium: Vale Park; Attendance: 1,049; Referee: Elliot Swallow

7 October 2025	Fleetwood Town	4–0	Leeds United U21	Fleetwood
19:00 BST	Norwood 4', 52', 87'; Davies 30'	Report		Stadium: Highbury Stadium; Attendance: 689; Referee: Declan Brown

7 October 2025	Accrington Stanley	0–2	Port Vale	Accrington
19:45 BST		Report	Hall 82'; Faal 85'	Stadium: Crown Ground; Attendance: 649; Referee: Robert Massey-Ellis

11 November 2025	Accrington Stanley	3–2	Leeds United U21	Accrington
19:46 GMT	Woods 69'; Pickles 78' (o.g.); Bauress 81'		Gray 3', 90'	Stadium: Crown Ground; Attendance: 418; Referee: Aaron Bannister

11 November 2025	Port Vale	3–3 (2–4 p)	Fleetwood Town	Stoke-on-Trent
19:46 GMT	Shipley 53'; Brown 56'; Hall 88'		Helm 32'; Medley 70', 83'	Stadium: Vale Park; Attendance: 723; Referee: Jamie O'Connor
	Penalties
	Stockley (penalty missed); Curtis (penalty scored); Paton (penalty scored); Byers (penalty missed)		(penalty scored) Helm; (penalty scored) Davies; (penalty scored) Graydon; (penalty scored) Ennis

==== Group H ====
Pos	Div	Team	Pld	W	PW	PL	L	GF	GA	GD	Pts	Qualification
1	L2	Crewe Alexandra	3	3	0	0	0	12	2	+10	9	Advance to Round 2
2	L2	Chesterfield	3	1	0	1	1	4	9	−5	4	Advance to Round 2
3	L1	Burton Albion	3	1	0	0	2	3	4	−1	3	
4	ACA	Liverpool U21	3	0	1	0	2	2	6	−4	2	

Source: EFL

2 September 2025	Burton Albion	2–0	Liverpool U21	Burton upon Trent
19:00 BST	Tavares 37'; Larsson 67'	Report		Stadium: Pirelli Stadium; Attendance: 973; Referee: Richard Aspinall

2 September 2025	Crewe Alexandra	7–1	Chesterfield	Crewe
19:00 BST	Tezgel 4', 6', 51'; Agius 16'; Moult 30'; Thibaut 57' (pen.); Armstrong 67'	Report	Lewis 21'	Stadium: Gresty Road; Attendance: 961; Referee: Michael Barlow

7 October 2025	Chesterfield	1–0	Burton Albion	Chesterfield
19:00 BST	Bonis 79'	Report		Stadium: SMH Group Stadium; Attendance: 1,239; Referee: Alex Chilowicz

14 October 2025	Crewe Alexandra	2–0	Liverpool U21	Crewe
19:00 BST	Tezgel 11' (pen.); Rankine 30'	Report		Stadium: Gresty Road; Attendance: 1,248; Referee: Martin Woods

11 November 2025	Burton Albion	1–3	Crewe Alexandra	Burton upon Trent
19:01 GMT	Scutt 50'		Bogle 10', 19'; Hodkin 48'	Stadium: Pirelli Stadium; Attendance: 791; Referee: Peter Wright

11 November 2025	Chesterfield	2–2 (10–11 p)	Liverpool U21	Chesterfield
19:01 GMT	Hobson 62'; Duffy 64'		Gordon 76', 90+2'	Stadium: SMH Group Stadium; Attendance: 2,631; Referee: Ross Joyce
	Penalties
	Fleck (penalty scored); Berry (penalty scored); Cook (penalty scored); Markanday (penalty missed); Darcy (penalty scored); Dickson (penalty scored); Sheckleford (penalty scored); Grimes (penalty scored); Daley-Campbell (penalty scored); Donacien (penalty scored); Boot (penalty scored); Fleck (penalty missed)		(penalty scored) Gordon; (penalty scored) Kelly; (penalty scored) Laffey; (penalty scored) Davidson; (penalty missed) Pilling; (penalty scored) Sonni-Lambie; (penalty scored) Pinnington; (penalty scored) Pitt; (penalty scored) Williams; (penalty scored) Lucky; (penalty scored) Mrozek; (penalty scored) Gordon

=== Southern section ===
==== Group A ====
Pos	Div	Team	Pld	W	PW	PL	L	GF	GA	GD	Pts	Qualification
1	L1	Cardiff City	3	2	0	0	1	4	2	+2	6	Advance to Round 2
2	L1	Exeter City	3	2	0	0	1	5	4	+1	6	Advance to Round 2
3	L2	Newport County	3	1	0	0	2	2	3	−1	3	
4	ACA	Arsenal U21	3	1	0	0	2	6	8	−2	3	

Source: EFL

16 September 2025	Exeter City	0–1	Cardiff City	Exeter
19:00 BST		Report	Robinson 55'	Stadium: St. James' Park; Attendance: 2,152; Referee: Robert Massey-Ellis

23 September 2025	Newport County	1–2	Arsenal U21	Newport
19:00 BST	Lloyd 2'	Report	Harriman-Annous 58' (pen.); Sagoe Jr. 89'	Stadium: Rodney Parade; Attendance: 1,218; Referee: Aaron Farmer

7 October 2025	Cardiff City	0–1	Newport County	Cardiff
19:00 BST		Report	Davies 43'	Stadium: Cardiff City Stadium; Attendance: 8,505; Referee: Ollie Yates

28 October 2025	Exeter City	4–3	Arsenal U21	Exeter
19:00 GMT	Magennis 50', 76'; Aitchison 64'; Wareham 87'		Sagoe Jr 16'; Dudziak 54'; Kamara 74'	Stadium: St. James' Park; Attendance: 3,606; Referee: Sam Mulhall

11 November 2025	Cardiff City	3–1	Arsenal U21	Cardiff
19:45 GMT	Perrett 19'; Spiers 67'; George 90+4'		Washington 17'	Stadium: Cardiff City Stadium; Attendance: 3,040; Referee: Richie Watkins

11 November 2025	Newport County	0–1	Exeter City	Newport
19:00 GMT			Turns 50'	Stadium: Rodney Parade; Attendance: 838; Referee: Scott Jackson

==== Group B ====
Pos	Div	Team	Pld	W	PW	PL	L	GF	GA	GD	Pts	Qualification
1	L2	Bristol Rovers	3	2	1	0	0	6	4	+2	8	Advance to Round 2
2	L1	Plymouth Argyle	3	2	0	0	1	8	3	+5	6	Advance to Round 2
3	L2	Cheltenham Town	3	0	1	0	2	2	5	−3	2	
4	ACA	Tottenham Hotspur U21	3	0	0	2	1	8	12	−4	2	

Source: EFL

26 August 2025	Bristol Rovers	4–4 (5–4 p)	Tottenham Hotspur U21	Horfield
19:00 BST	Harrison 45+2'; Cavegn 54', 73'; Hutchinson 69'	Report	Thompson 10', 58'; Williams-Barnett 14'; Akhamrich 16'	Stadium: Memorial Stadium; Attendance: 1,067; Referee: Stephen Parkinson
	Penalties
	Cavegn (penalty scored); Thomas (penalty scored); Hutchinson (penalty scored); Howley (penalty missed); Conteh (penalty scored); Dewsbury (penalty missed); Moore (penalty scored)		(penalty missed) Russell-Denny; (penalty scored) Lehane; (penalty scored) Cassanova; (penalty scored) Olusesi; (penalty scored) Akhamrich; (penalty missed) Logan; (penalty missed) Rowswell

2 September 2025	Plymouth Argyle	2–0	Cheltenham Town	Plymouth
19:00 BST	Tolaj 5', 45'	Report		Stadium: Home Park; Attendance: 3,726; Referee: Ross Martin

23 September 2025	Plymouth Argyle	6–2	Tottenham Hotspur U21	Plymouth
19:00 BST	Ross 5'; Finn 20', 53'; Pepple 28'; Oseni 41'; Campbell 86'	Report	Russell-Denny 57'; Irow 90+2'	Stadium: Home Park; Attendance: 4,834; Referee: Jacob Miles

7 October 2025	Cheltenham Town	0–1	Bristol Rovers	Cheltenham
19:00 BST		Report	Thomas 60'	Stadium: Whaddon Road; Attendance: 1,713; Referee: Matthew Russell

28 October 2025	Cheltenham Town	2–2 (3–1 p)	Tottenham Hotspur U21	Cheltenham
19:00 GMT	Martin 5'; Taylor 67'		Irow 25'; Kyerematen 89'	Stadium: Whaddon Road; Attendance: 2,383; Referee: Declan Brown
	Penalties
	Pell (penalty scored); Sohna (penalty scored); Taylor (penalty scored)		(penalty missed) Kyerematen; (penalty scored) Batty; (penalty missed) Black; (penalty missed) Russell-Denny

11 November 2025	Bristol Rovers	1–0	Plymouth Argyle	Horfield
19:00 GMT	Conteh 90+4'			Stadium: Memorial Stadium; Attendance: 2,110; Referee: Aaron Farmer

==== Group C ====
Pos	Div	Team	Pld	W	PW	PL	L	GF	GA	GD	Pts	Qualification
1	L1	Northampton Town	3	3	0	0	0	6	1	+5	9	Advance to Round 2
2	L2	Walsall	3	1	1	0	1	3	2	+1	5	Advance to Round 2
3	L2	Shrewsbury Town	3	1	0	0	2	5	6	−1	3	
4	ACA	Chelsea U21	3	0	0	1	2	1	6	−5	1	

Source: EFL

26 August 2025	Shrewsbury Town	3–1	Chelsea U21	Shrewsbury
19:00 BST	McDermott 14'; Marquis 65'; Boyle 72'	Report	Mheuka 10'	Stadium: Shrewsbury's New Meadow; Attendance: 1,714; Referee: Gareth Rhodes

2 September 2025	Shrewsbury Town	1–3	Walsall	Shrewsbury
19:00 BST	Ihionvien 10'	Report	Finnigan 5'; Adomah 67'; Okeke 80'	Stadium: Shrewsbury's New Meadow; Attendance: 2,004; Referee: Declan Bourne

23 September 2025	Northampton Town	3–0	Chelsea U21	Northampton
19:00 BST	Swyer 19'; Jacobs 23'; List 28' (pen.)	Report		Stadium: Sixfields Stadium; Attendance: 1,314; Referee: Darren Drysdale

7 October 2025	Walsall	0–1	Northampton Town	Walsall
19:00 BST		Report	Swyer 88'	Stadium: Bescot Stadium; Attendance: 1,907; Referee: Richard Eley

28 October 2025	Walsall	0–0 (4–2 p)	Chelsea U21	Walsall
19:00 GMT				Stadium: Bescot Stadium; Attendance: 1,068; Referee: Elliot Swallow
	Penalties
	Adomah (penalty missed); Clarke (penalty scored); Straw (penalty scored); Jellis (penalty scored); Okeke (penalty scored)		(penalty scored) Best; (penalty missed) Walsh

11 November 2025	Northampton Town	2–1	Shrewsbury Town	Northampton
19:01 GMT	Swyer 29'; McCarthy 78'		McDermott 37'	Stadium: Sixfields Stadium; Attendance: 802; Referee: Wayne Cartmel

==== Group D ====
Pos	Div	Team	Pld	W	PW	PL	L	GF	GA	GD	Pts	Qualification
1	L2	Swindon Town	3	2	0	0	1	9	5	+4	6	Advance to Round 2
2	ACA	West Ham United U21	3	2	0	0	1	9	6	+3	6	Advance to Round 2
3	L1	Reading	3	2	0	0	1	6	4	+2	6	
4	L2	Milton Keynes Dons	3	0	0	0	3	1	10	−9	0	

Source: EFL

2 September 2025	Swindon Town	3–2	Reading	Swindon
19:00 BST	Ehibhatiomhan 11'; Palmer 24'; Wright 47'	Report	Ward 36' (o.g.); Marriott 44'	Stadium: County Ground; Attendance: 3,667; Referee: Sam Mulhall

16 September 2025	MK Dons	1–5	West Ham United U21	Milton Keynes
19:00 BST	Collins 67' (pen.)	Report	Fearon 12', 39'; Maguire 43' (o.g.); Marshall 71', 90+8'	Stadium: Stadium MK; Attendance: 1,074; Referee: Aaron Farmer

30 September 2025	Reading	3–1	West Ham United U21	Reading
19:00 BST	Borgnis 64'; O'Mahony 88' (pen.); Okine-Peters 90+7'	Report	Marshall 9'	Stadium: Madjeski Stadium; Attendance: 1,247; Referee: Kirsty Dowle

7 October 2025	Reading	1–0	MK Dons	Reading
19:00 BST	Patton 88'	Report		Stadium: Madjeski Stadium; Attendance: 1,623; Referee: David Rock

28 October 2025	Swindon Town	2–3	West Ham United U21	Swindon
19:00 GMT	Glatzel 51', 71'		Ajala 25'; Earthy 42'; Landers 69'	Stadium: County Ground; Attendance: 2,096; Referee: Carl Brook

11 November 2025	MK Dons	0–4	Swindon Town	Milton Keynes
19:01 GMT			Clarke 11'; Drinan 32' (pen.), 35', 71'	Stadium: Stadium MK; Attendance: 1,036; Referee: Elliott Swallow

==== Group E ====
Pos	Div	Team	Pld	W	PW	PL	L	GF	GA	GD	Pts	Qualification
1	L1	Stevenage	3	3	0	0	0	12	4	+8	9	Advance to Round 2
2	L1	AFC Wimbledon	3	2	0	0	1	6	7	−1	6	Advance to Round 2
3	L2	Bromley	3	0	1	0	2	5	7	−2	2	
4	ACA	Crystal Palace U21	3	0	0	1	2	6	11	−5	1	

Source: EFL

2 September 2025	AFC Wimbledon	1–5	Stevenage	Wimbledon
19:00 BST	Orsi 31' (pen.)	Report	Patterson 4'; Lubala 15'; Ahadme 45', 81'; White 50'	Stadium: Plough Lane; Attendance: 1,375; Referee: Ben Atkinson

2 September 2025	Bromley	3–3 (4–3 p)	Crystal Palace U21	Bromley
19:45 BST	Krauhaus 31'; Elerewe 42'; Dinanga 69'	Report	Marsh 27', 88'; Nascimento 35'	Stadium: Hayes Lane; Attendance: 554; Referee: Aaron Farmer
	Penalties
	Long (penalty missed); Arthurs (penalty scored); Dinanga (penalty scored); Stepien-Iwumene (penalty scored); Odutayo (penalty scored)		(penalty missed) Marsh; (penalty scored) Nascimento; (penalty scored) Rodney; (penalty scored) Reid; (penalty missed) Browne

16 September 2025	AFC Wimbledon	3–1	Crystal Palace U21	Wimbledon
19:00 BST	Lewis 45+1'; Hackford 74'; Jennings 87'	Report	Agbinone 62' (pen.)	Stadium: Plough Lane; Attendance: 599; Referee: Elliot Swallow

7 October 2025	Stevenage	2–1	Bromley	Stevenage
19:00 BST	White 21'; Ahadme 83'	Report	Webster 68'	Stadium: Broadhall Way; Attendance: 816; Referee: Elliott Swallow

21 October 2025	Stevenage	5–2	Crystal Palace U21	Stevenage
19:00 BST	Lee 9' (o.g.); Malcolm 24'; Patterson 37', 77'; Orford 90+1'		King 42'; Rodney 72'	Stadium: Broadhall Way; Attendance: 617; Referee: Stephen Parkinson

11 November 2025	Bromley	1–2	AFC Wimbledon	Bromley
19:01 GMT	Odutayo 33'		Hackford 14'; Browne 73'	Stadium: Hayes Lane; Attendance: 1,551; Referee: Paul Howard

==== Group F ====
Pos	Div	Team	Pld	W	PW	PL	L	GF	GA	GD	Pts	Qualification
1	L1	Leyton Orient	3	3	0	0	0	6	2	+4	9	Advance to Round 2
2	L1	Peterborough United	3	2	0	0	1	7	6	+1	6	Advance to Round 2
3	L2	Crawley Town	3	1	0	0	2	6	6	0	3	
4	ACA	Aston Villa U21	3	0	0	0	3	4	9	−5	0	

Source: EFL

2 September 2025	Peterborough United	1–3	Leyton Orient	Peterborough
19:00 BST	Mills 45+2'	Report	Wellens 34'; Moorhouse 57'; Craig 68'	Stadium: London Road Stadium; Attendance: 2,459; Referee: Alex Chilowicz

16 September 2025	Crawley Town	4–2	Aston Villa U21	Crawley
19:45 BST	Dixon 19'; Radcliffe 22', 64'; Loft 58'	Report	Fortes 45+3'; Broggio 56' (pen.)	Stadium: Broadfield Stadium; Attendance: 743; Referee: Andrew Humphries

30 September 2025	Peterborough United	4–2	Aston Villa U21	Peterborough
19:00 BST	Lisbie 52', 67', 74'; Morgan 72'	Report	Koné 41'; Lynskey 48'	Stadium: London Road Stadium; Attendance: 1,955; Referee: Alan Young

7 October 2025	Leyton Orient	2–1	Crawley Town	Leyton
19:00 BST	Mitchell 40'; Connolly 90+3'	Report	Flower 3'	Stadium: Brisbane Road; Attendance: 1,373; Referee: Darren Drysdale

28 October 2025	Leyton Orient	1–0	Aston Villa U21	Leyton
19:00 GMT	Jaiyesimi 78'			Stadium: Brisbane Road; Attendance: 1,515; Referee: Aaron Farmer

11 November 2025	Crawley Town	1–2	Peterborough United	Crawley
19:46 GMT	Bajrami 77'		Morgan 35'; O'Brien-Brady 90+4'	Stadium: Broadfield Stadium; Attendance: 924; Referee: Carl Brook

==== Group G ====
Pos	Div	Team	Pld	W	PW	PL	L	GF	GA	GD	Pts	Qualification
1	L2	Colchester United	3	3	0	0	0	6	2	+4	9	Advance to Round 2
2	L1	Wycombe Wanderers	3	2	0	0	1	7	3	+4	6	Advance to Round 2
3	L2	Gillingham	3	1	0	0	2	5	6	−1	3	
4	ACA	Fulham U21	3	0	0	0	3	2	9	−7	0	

Source: EFL

2 September 2025	Gillingham	4–1	Fulham U21	Gillingham
19:00 BST	Dobbs 3'; Beszant 48'; Wyllie 61'; Sargent 71'	Report	Loupalo-Bi 90+8'	Stadium: Priestfield Stadium; Attendance: 962; Referee: Carl Brook

2 September 2025	Wycombe Wanderers	1–2	Colchester United	High Wycombe
19:00 BST	Lowry 45'	Report	Williams 29'; Tucker 90'	Stadium: Adams Park; Attendance: 930; Referee: Darren Drysdale

7 October 2025	Wycombe Wanderers	3–1	Fulham U21	High Wycombe
19:00 BST	McNeilly 24'; Boyd-Munce 27'; Fink 50'	Report	Ali-Wahid 52'	Stadium: Adams Park; Attendance: 569; Referee: James Durkin

7 October 2025	Colchester United	2–1	Gillingham	Colchester
19:45 BST	Mbick 85'; Read 90+2' (pen.)	Report	Vokes 15'	Stadium: Colchester Community Stadium; Attendance: 1,467; Referee: Carl Brook

11 November 2025	Gillingham	0–3	Wycombe Wanderers	Gillingham
19:01 GMT			Lowry 9'; Matton 61'; Fink 84'	Stadium: Priestfield Stadium; Attendance: 906; Referee: Abigail Byrne

11 November 2025	Colchester United	2–0	Fulham U21	Colchester
19:46 GMT	Tovide 80'; Tucker 88'			Stadium: Colchester Community Stadium; Attendance: 1,061; Referee: Isaac Searle

==== Group H ====
Pos	Div	Team	Pld	W	PW	PL	L	GF	GA	GD	Pts	Qualification
1	L1	Luton Town	3	2	0	0	1	8	5	+3	6	Advance to Round 2
2	L2	Cambridge United	3	2	0	0	1	6	4	+2	6	Advance to Round 2
3	L2	Barnet	3	1	1	0	1	5	7	−2	5	
4	ACA	Brighton & Hove Albion U21	3	0	0	1	2	2	5	−3	1	

Source: EFL

2 September 2025	Luton Town	4–1	Barnet	Luton
19:30 BST	Nordås 11'; Yates 19'; Bramall 45+2'; Morris 87' (pen.)	Report	Senior 90+6'	Stadium: Kenilworth Road; Attendance: 3,157; Referee: Stephen Parkinson

30 September 2025	Barnet	1–1 (5–4 p)	Brighton & Hove Albion U21	Edgware
19:45 BST	Stead 58'	Report	Robertson 44'	Stadium: The Hive Stadium; Attendance: 433; Referee: Craig Hicks
	Penalties
	Adeniran (penalty scored); Hawkins (penalty scored); Stead (penalty scored); Glover (penalty scored); Winterburn (penalty missed); Galvin (penalty scored)		(penalty missed) Knight; (penalty scored) Nti; (penalty scored) Shaw; (penalty scored) Keogh; (penalty scored) Slisby; (penalty missed) Simmonds

7 October 2025	Cambridge United	3–1	Luton Town	Cambridge
19:00 BST	McConnell 33'; Kachunga 46', 80'	Report	Juel Andersen 15'	Stadium: Abbey Stadium; Attendance: 1,767; Referee: Jacob Miles

21 October 2025	Barnet	3–2	Cambridge United	Edgware
19:45 BST	Ndlovu 2'; Assombalonga 72'; Osadebe 90'		Hawkins 20' (o.g.); Kachunga 33'	Stadium: The Hive Stadium; Attendance: 692; Referee: Sam Mulhall

28 October 2025	Luton Town	3–1	Brighton & Hove Albion U21	Luton
19:00 GMT	Yates 37', 43' (pen.); Evans 79'		Atom 74'	Stadium: Kenilworth Road; Attendance: 2,212; Referee: Alex Chilowicz

5 November 2025	Cambridge United	1–0	Brighton & Hove Albion U21	Cambridge
19:00 GMT	Mayor 6'	Report		Stadium: Abbey Stadium; Attendance: 599; Referee: Alan Young

== Round of 32 ==
The Round of 32 draw took place live on Sky Sports News on Thursday, 13 November at 14:30 GMT.

=== Northern section ===
Group	Winners (seeded in round of 32 draw)	Runners-up (unseeded in round of 32 draw)
A	Salford City	Stockport County
B	Tranmere Rovers	Blackpool
C	Doncaster Rovers	Bradford City
D	Lincoln City	Barnsley
E	Bolton Wanderers	Rotherham United
F	Harrogate Town	Huddersfield Town
G	Port Vale	Fleetwood Town
H	Crewe Alexandra	Chesterfield

2 December 2025	Bolton Wanderers (3)	3–0	Bradford City (3)	Horwich
19:00 GMT	Cissoko 11', 20'; Forss 69'			Stadium: Toughsheet Community Stadium; Attendance: 2,500; Referee: David Rock

2 December 2025	Doncaster Rovers (3)	5–1	Chesterfield (4)	Doncaster
19:00 GMT	Sharp 15', 77', 90+1'; Ajayi 19'; Senior 31'		Bonis 74'	Stadium: Keepmoat Stadium; Attendance: 1,604; Referee: James Oldham

2 December 2025	Harrogate Town (4)	4–2	Blackpool (3)	Harrogate
19:00 GMT	Smith 7'; O'Connor 13'; Muldoon 17', 84'		Hansson 45'; Fletcher 73'	Stadium: Wetherby Road; Attendance: 1,372; Referee: Wayne Cartmel

2 December 2025	Lincoln City (3)	0–2	Huddersfield Town (3)	Lincoln
19:00 GMT		Report	Taylor 49'; Wallace 90'	Stadium: Sincil Bank; Attendance: 2,016; Referee: Ben Speedie

2 December 2025	Port Vale (3)	5–0	Barnsley (3)	Stoke-on-Trent
19:00 GMT	Paton 5', 8'; Brown 72'; Waine 80'; Debrah 83'			Stadium: Vale Park; Attendance: 636; Referee: Elliot Bell

2 December 2025	Salford City (4)	2–7	Rotherham United (3)	Salford
19:00 GMT	Siri 8'; Stockton 31'		Ayres 18'; Clarke 22'; Benson 39', 53', 55'; Gore 85'; Gardner 89'	Stadium: Moor Lane; Attendance: 519; Referee: Darren Drysdale

2 December 2025	Tranmere Rovers (4)	0–3	Fleetwood Town (4)	Birkenhead
19:00 GMT			Brough 56' (o.g.); Coughlan 71'; Helm 88'	Stadium: Prenton Park; Attendance: 1,139; Referee: Aaron Bannister

3 December 2025	Crewe Alexandra (4)	1–1 (1–4 p)	Stockport County (3)	Crewe
19:00 GMT	Thibaut 5'		Andrésson 33'	Stadium: Gresty Road; Attendance: 1,535; Referee: Richie Watkins
	Penalties
	Tezgel (penalty missed); March (penalty missed); Agius (penalty scored)		(penalty scored) Dodgson; (penalty scored) Moxon; (penalty scored) Fevrier; (penalty scored) Diamond

=== Southern section ===
Group	Winners (seeded in round of 32 draw)	Runners-up (unseeded in round of 32 draw)
A	Cardiff City	Exeter City
B	Bristol Rovers	Plymouth Argyle
C	Northampton Town	Walsall
D	Swindon Town	West Ham United U21
E	Stevenage	AFC Wimbledon
F	Leyton Orient	Peterborough United
G	Colchester United	Wycombe Wanderers
H	Luton Town	Cambridge United

2 December 2025	Bristol Rovers (4)	2–2 (4–2 p)	Cambridge United (3)	Horfield
19:00 GMT	Harrison 9' (pen.), 18'		Watts 68'; Kaikai 90+4' (pen.)	Stadium: Memorial Stadium; Attendance: 878; Referee: James Durkin
	Penalties
	Cavegn (penalty scored); Sparkes (penalty scored); Thomas (penalty scored); Morton (penalty missed); Conteh (penalty scored)		(penalty missed) Kaikai; (penalty scored) Brophy; (penalty missed) Munday; (penalty scored) Ruddock Mpanzu

2 December 2025	Cardiff City (3)	1–5	AFC Wimbledon (3)	Cardiff
19:00 GMT	Giles 88'		Sasu 29', 46', 54', 76'; Bugiel 49'	Stadium: Cardiff City Stadium; Attendance: 2,107; Referee: Abigail Byrne

2 December 2025	Leyton Orient (3)	0–1	Plymouth Argyle (3)	Leyton
19:00 GMT			Tolaj 90+3'	Stadium: Brisbane Road; Attendance: 1,502; Referee: Sam Mulhall

2 December 2025	Luton Town (3)	4–0	Exeter City (3)	Luton
19:00 GMT	Nordås 13', 40'; Morris 34'; Nelson 67'			Stadium: Kenilworth Road; Attendance: 2,233; Referee: Kirsty Dowle

2 December 2025	Northampton Town (3)	2–0	Wycombe Wanderers (3)	Northampton
19:00 GMT	Edwards 26'; Fornah 40'			Stadium: Sixfields Stadium; Attendance: 1,022; Referee: Isaac Searle

2 December 2025	Stevenage (3)	1–2	Walsall (4)	Stevenage
19:00 GMT	Piergianni 57'		Richards 63', 72'	Stadium: Broadhall Way; Attendance: 633; Referee: Alex Chilowicz

2 December 2025	Swindon Town (4)	1–0	Peterborough United (3)	Swindon
19:30 GMT	Clarke 88'			Stadium: County Ground; Attendance: 2,135; Referee: Dale Baines

9 December 2025	Colchester United (4)	0–1	West Ham United U21	Colchester
19:45 GMT			Earthy 17'	Stadium: Colchester Community Stadium; Attendance: 3,913; Referee: Richie Watkins

== Round of 16 ==
The Round of 16 was drawn on 6 December 2025.

=== Northern section ===
13 January 2026	Bolton Wanderers (3)	0–1	Port Vale (3)	Horwich, Bolton
19:00 GMT			Waine 90'	Stadium: Toughsheet Community Stadium; Attendance: 1,955; Referee: Jamie O'Connor

13 January 2026	Huddersfield Town (3)	3–0	Rotherham United (3)	Huddersfield
19:00 GMT	Alves 36'; Sørensen 41'; Ashia 86'			Stadium: Kirklees Stadium; Attendance: 1,656; Referee: Stephen Parkinson

13 January 2026	Doncaster Rovers (3)	3–1	Fleetwood Town (4)	Doncaster
19:00 GMT	Sharp 25', 52'; Adelakun 84'		Davies 90'	Stadium: Eco-Power Stadium; Attendance: 1,506; Referee: Richard Eley

13 January 2026	Stockport County (3)	2–1	Harrogate Town (4)	Stockport
19:00 GMT	Stokes 77', 90+4'		Cursons 49'	Stadium: Edgeley Park; Attendance: 4,442; Referee: James Oldham

=== Southern section ===
12 January 2026	AFC Wimbledon (3)	4–2	West Ham United U21	Wimbledon, London
19:00 GMT	Smith 3'; Maycock 40'; Browne 47'; Hippolyte 90+6'		Ajala 66'; Orford 84'	Stadium: Plough Lane; Attendance: 2,043; Referee: Kirsty Dowle

13 January 2026	Luton Town (3)	1–2	Swindon Town (4)	Luton
19:00 GMT	Yates 7'		Wright 37'; Mabete 53'	Stadium: Kenilworth Road; Attendance: 3,243; Referee: Peter Wright

13 January 2026	Bristol Rovers (4)	3–4	Plymouth Argyle (3)	Horfield, Bristol
19:00 GMT	Forde 21'; Cavegn 39'; Thomas 61'		Watts 2'; Galloway 46'; Tolaj 49'; Pepple 90+4'	Stadium: Memorial Stadium; Attendance: 2,548; Referee: Alex Chilowicz

14 January 2026	Northampton Town (3)	4–2	Walsall (4)	Northampton
19:00 GMT	Swyer 18', 48'; Hoskins 62'; Eaves 90+2' (pen.)		Adomah 5'; Kanu 75'	Stadium: Sixfields Stadium; Attendance: 1,406; Referee: Abigail Byrne

== Quarter-finals ==
The quarter-final draw was made on 17 January 2026

=== Northern section ===
10 February 2026	Port Vale (3)	0–4	Stockport County (3)	Stoke on Trent
19:00 GMT	Heneghan (yellow card) 72'; Shipley (yellow card) 81'	Report	Edun (yellow card) 27'; Sidibeh 36', 59'; Amos 83' (o.g.); Norwood (yellow card) 89'; Diamond 90+1'	Stadium: Vale Park; Attendance: 1,577

10 February 2026	Huddersfield Town (3)	1–1 (0–2 p)	Doncaster Rovers (3)	Huddersfield
19:00 GMT	Ashia 52'	Report	Sharp 35' (pen.)	Stadium: Kirklees Stadium; Attendance: 2,830
	Penalties
	May (penalty missed); Sørensen (penalty missed); Charles (penalty missed); Evans (penalty missed)		(penalty missed) Molyneux; (penalty scored) Close; (penalty scored) Gotts

=== Southern section ===
10 February 2026	AFC Wimbledon (3)	1–2	Northampton Town (3)	Wimbledon, London
19:00 GMT	Stevens 50'	Report	Vale 38'; McAdam (yellow card) 75'; Eaves 73' (yellow card) 90'	Stadium: Plough Lane; Attendance: 1,752 (319 away fans); Referee: Paul Howard

24 February 2026	Luton Town (3) (Note: Luton Town were fully reinstated and awarded a walkover after Swindon Town were ordered to withdraw from the competition by the EFL for fielding two ineligible players in the Round of 16.)	2–1	Plymouth Argyle (3)	Luton
19:00 GMT	Jones 16'; Clark 89'	Report	Finn 77'	Stadium: Kenilworth Road; Attendance: 4,203

== Semi-finals ==
The semi-final draw was made on 12 February 2026

3 March 2026	Doncaster Rovers (3)	0–1	Stockport County (3)	Doncaster
20:00 GMT			Norwood 11'	Stadium: Eco-Power Stadium; Attendance: 5,418

4 March 2026	Luton Town (3)	2–1	Northampton Town (3)	Luton
19:30 GMT	Wells 53'; Walsh 82'		McAdam 17'	Stadium: Kenilworth Road; Attendance: 10,280

== Final ==
12 April 2026
15:00 BST

Luton Town	3–1	Stockport County
Lawrence 22'; Wells 39', 90+1'	Report	Sidibeh 11'

Wembley Stadium, London
Attendance: 49,517
Referee: Martin Coy
Assistant Referees: Marc Wilson, Joe Simpson
