= 2025–26 Accrington Stanley F.C. season =

57th season in existence of Accrington Stanley FC

Accrington Stanley
2025–26 season
- Owner: Andy Holt
- Manager: John Doolan
- Stadium: Crown Ground
- League Two: 16th
- FA Cup: Round 2 (lost to Mansfield)
- EFL Cup: Round 2 (lost to Doncaster)
- EFL Trophy: 3rd in group
- Top goalscorer: League: Paddy Madden (6); All: Paddy Madden (8)
- Biggest win: 4-0 vs Swindon (18th October)
- Biggest defeat: 0-4 vs Notts County (17th March)

The 2025–26 season is the 57th season in the history of Accrington Stanley Football Club and their third consecutive season in League Two. In addition to the domestic league, the club are also to participate in the FA Cup, the EFL Cup, and the 2025–26 EFL Trophy.

Similar to the previous season, Accrington started slowly and were last in the league after a few games. Due to a strong run in the middle of the season the team climbed to the middle of the table by the start of 2026 with considerable distance to the relegation battle. The domestic cup runs ended with defeats at home against EFL League One teams, going out to Doncaster Rovers in the EFL Cup and Mansfield Town in the FA Cup on penalties.

== Transfers and contracts ==
=== In ===
Date	Pos.	Player	From	Fee	Ref.
1 July 2025 (Note: The transfer was announced on 23 June, and would become official on July 1 once his contract at King's Lynn had expired)	LB	(England) Freddie Sass	(England) King's Lynn Town	Bosman	
1 July 2025 (Note: The transfer was announced on 19 June, and would become official on July 1 once his contract at Curzon had expired)	CM	(England) Isaac Sinclair	(England) Curzon Ashton	Bosman	

=== Out ===
Date	Pos.	Player	To	Fee	Ref.
10 June 2025	CF	(England) Jimmy Knowles	(England) Altrincham	Undisclosed	
18 August 2025	CM	(England) Ben Woods	(England) Peterborough United	Undisclosed	
26 January 2026	CB	(England) Benn Ward	(England) Reading	£500,000	

=== Loaned in ===
Date	Pos.	Player	From	Date until	Ref.
8 July 2025	GK	(England) Ollie Wright	(England) Southampton	31 May 2026	
5 August 2025	CM	(England) Joe Bauress	(England) Burnley	2 February 2026 (Note: On 2 February, Bauress and Pye were recalled back to Burnley from their initial season-long loan)	
7 August 2025	LB	(England) Logan Pye	(England) Burnley	2 February 2026	
21 August 2025	CF	(Republic of Ireland) Paddy Madden	(England) Chesterfield	31 May 2026	
1 September 2025	LW	(England) Isaac Heath	(England) Everton	31 May 2026	
22 January 2026	CDM	(Scotland) Luke Butterfield	(England) Chesterfield	31 May 2026	
30 January 2026	CF	(England) David Abimbola	(England) Bolton Wanderers	31 May 2026	

=== Loaned out ===
Date	Pos.	Player	To	Date until	Ref.
24 October 2025	CF	(England) Anjola Popoola	(England) Marine	22 November 2025	
24 October 2025	LM	(England) Finlay Tunstall	(England) Marine	22 November 2025	
3 December 2025	LM	(England) Finlay Tunstall	(England) Brighouse Town	30 December 2025	
4 December 2025	CB	(England) Josh Smith	(England) Buxton	30 December 2025	
5 December 2025	CF	(England) Anjola Popoola	(England) Chorley	7 February 2026 (Note: On 9 January, Popoola's loan at Chorley was extended by a further month)	
14 January 2026	CAM	(England) Dan Martin	(England) Marine	11 February 2026	
27 January 2026	CM	(England) Finlay Tunstall	(England) Prescot Cables	24 February 2026	
11 February 2026	CF	(Wales) Charlie Caton	(England) Hartlepool United	31 May 2026	
17 March 2026	CF	(England) Anjola Popoola	(England) Macclesfield	31 May 2026	

=== Released / Out of Contract ===
Date	Pos.	Player	Subsequent club	Join date	Ref.
30 June 2025	RM	(England) Seb Quirk	(Republic of Ireland) Sligo Rovers	1 July 2025	
30 June 2025	GK	(England) Liam Isherwood	(England) Warrington Town	5 July 2025	
30 June 2025	CB	(England) Aaron Pickles	(England) Southport	18 July 2025	
30 June 2025	LW	(England) Ashley Hunter	(England) Marine	8 August 2025	
30 June 2025	CB	(Australia) Jay Rich-Baghuelou			
30 June 2025	CB	(England) Lewis Rhodes			
30 June 2025	RM	(Northern Ireland) Lewis Trickett			

=== New Contract ===
Date	Pos.	Player	Contract until	Ref.
26 June 2025	CM	(England) Conor Grant	30 June 2026	
1 July 2025	CAM	(England) Dan Martin	30 June 2026	
2 July 2025	CDM	(Republic of Ireland) Seamus Conneely	30 June 2026	
6 July 2025	GK	(England) James Rogerson	Undisclosed (Note: First professional contract)	
6 July 2025	CM	(England) Finlay Tunstall	Undisclosed	
30 September 2025	CB	(England) Josh Smith	30 June 2027	
3 February 2026	RB	(Scotland) Donald Love	30 June 2028	
27 February 2026	CB	(England) Farrend Rawson	30 June 2028	
2 May 2026	RW	(England) Shaun Whalley	30 June 2027	

== Pre-season and friendlies ==
In June, Accrington Stanley announced pre-season friendlies against Blackburn Rovers, Everton, Wigan Athletic and Rotherham United. In July, a fifth friendly was added against Clitheroe.

A behind-closed-doors, fixture against Blackpool was also confirmed.

Win Draw Loss Fixtures

8 July 2025 Friendly	Blackpool	0–1	Accrington Stanley	Squires Gate
12:30 BST		Report	Woods 77'	Stadium: Blackpool FC Training Ground; Attendance: 0 (behind-closed-doors)

12 July 2025 Friendly	Accrington Stanley	1–2	Blackburn Rovers	Accrington
15:00 BST	Caton 50'	Report	Ōhashi 31'; Gueye 84'	Stadium: Crown Ground; Attendance: 3,543 (2,013 BR)

15 July 2025 Friendly	Accrington Stanley	1–1	Everton	Accrington
19:45 BST	Ward 50'	Report	Beto 77' (pen.)	Stadium: Crown Ground; Attendance: 3,875 (2,336 Everton)

19 July 2025 Friendly	Accrington Stanley	2–4	Wigan Athletic	Accrington
15:00 BST	Whalley 34', 54' (pen.)	Report	Costelloe 65', 78' (pen.); Asamoah 76', 89'	Stadium: Crown Ground; Attendance: 1,141 (676 from Wigan)

26 July 2025 Friendly	Accrington Stanley	4–1	Rotherham United	Accrington
15:00 BST	Rawson 11'; Whalley 20'; Martin 25'; Coyle 56'	Report	Nombe 60'	Stadium: Crown Ground; Attendance: 613 (174 RUFC)

27 July 2025 Friendly	Clitheroe	Cancelled	Accrington Stanley	Clitheroe
12:30 BST				Stadium: Loom Loft Stadium
Note: Fixture was cancelled due to injuries.

== Competitions ==
=== League Two ===
==== League table ====
Pos	Team	Pld	W	D	L	GF	GA	GD	Pts
14	Bristol Rovers	46	19	5	22	56	65	−9	62
15	Fleetwood Town	46	15	16	15	57	58	−1	61
16	Accrington Stanley	46	14	11	21	47	58	−11	53
17	Gillingham	46	13	14	19	53	72	−19	53
18	Cheltenham Town	46	14	10	22	53	79	−26	52

Source: EFL Official Website
Rules for classification: 1) Points; 2) Goal difference; 3) Number of goals scored; 4) Head-to-head results; 5) Wins; 6) Away goals; 7) Penalty points (sec 9.5); 8) 12-point sending off offences

==== Results summary ====
Overall								Home						Away					
Pld	W	D	L	GF	GA	GD	Pts	W	D	L	GF	GA	GD	W	D	L	GF	GA	GD
45	14	11	20	47	55	−8	53	9	5	9	27	27	0	5	6	11	20	28	−8

Last updated: 25 April 2026.
Source: Soccerway

==== Results by round ====
Round	1	2	3	5	6	7	8	9	10	11	12	13	14	4^{1}	15	16	17	18	19	20	21	22	23	24	27	28	29	30	31	32	33	34	26^{3}	35	36	37	38	39	40	41	42	43	25^{2}	44	45
Ground	H	A	A	H	A	A	H	A	H	A	H	H	A	H	A	H	A	H	A	H	A	H	H	A	H	A	A	H	H	A	A	H	H	A	H	A	H	H	A	H	A	H	A	A	H
Result	D	L	L	D	D	L	W	W	L	L	L	W	L	D	D	W	D	W	W	L	L	W	W	W	L	D	W	W	W	L	W	L	L	L	D	D	L	L	L	W	L	L	L	D	D
Position	8	18	19	21	21	24	20	18	19	20	20	20	22	21	20	18	18	17	16	17	17	17	16	14	16	16	14	13	13	13	13	13	13	13	15	15	15	15	15	15	16	16	16	16	16
Points	1	1	1	2	3	3	6	9	9	9	9	12	12	13	14	17	18	21	24	24	24	27	30	33	33	34	37	40	43	43	46	46	46	46	47	48	48	48	48	51	51	51	51	52	53

Source: Soccerway
A = Away; H = Home; W = Win; D = Draw; L = Loss; P = Postponed
Notes:
- ^{1} Matchday 4 (vs. Tranmere Rovers) was postponed due to their EFL Cup first round tie being rescheduled.
- ^{2} Matchday 25 (vs. Colchester United) was postponed due to a frozen pitch.
- ^{3} Matchday 26 (vs. Barnet) was postponed due to a frozen pitch.

==== Matches ====
On 26 June, the League Two fixtures were announced, with Accrington hosting Gillingham on the opening day.

Win Draw Loss Fixtures

2 August 2025 1	Accrington Stanley	1–1	Gillingham	Accrington
15:00 BST	Matthews (yellow card) 49'; Walton 66'; Grant (yellow card) 66'	Report	Gbode (yellow card) 14'; Ogie (yellow card) 61'; Matthews 79' (o.g.)	Stadium: Crown Ground; Attendance: 2,302 (610 from Gillingham); Referee: Oliver Yates

9 August 2025 2	Crewe Alexandra	2–0	Accrington Stanley	Crewe
15:00 BST	Hutchinson 18'; Agius 30'; Sanders (yellow card) 35'	Report	Brown (yellow card) 73'; Rawson (yellow card) 76'	Stadium: Gresty Road; Attendance: 5,093 (169 ASFC); Referee: Richard Eley

16 August 2025 3	Salford City	2–1	Accrington Stanley	Kersal
15:00 BST	Woodburn 23'; Garbutt 27', (yellow card) 43'	Report	Walton (yellow card) 54', (goal) 85' (pen.)	Stadium: Moor Lane; Attendance: 2,943 (314 ASFC); Referee: Matthew Corlett

23 August 2025 5	Accrington Stanley	1–1	Grimsby Town	Accrington
15:00 BST	Bauress (yellow card) 21'; Walton 65', (yellow card) 75'; Love (yellow card) 71'; Sinclair (yellow card) 88'; Henderson (yellow card) 90'	Report	Kabia 26', (penalty missed) 50'	Stadium: Crown Ground; Attendance: 2,647 (1,146 from GTFC); Referee: Ross Martin

30 August 2025 6	Shrewsbury Town	0–0	Accrington Stanley	Shrewsbury
15:00 BST	Kabia (yellow card) 43'; Perry (yellow card) 66'; Boyle (yellow card) 67'	Report	Matthews (yellow card) 39'; Love (yellow card) 61'; Henderson (yellow card) 76'	Stadium: New Meadow; Attendance: 4,795; Referee: Oliver Mackey

6 September 2025 7	Cheltenham Town	1–0	Accrington Stanley	Cheltenham
15:00 BST	Hutchinson 2'; Young (yellow card) 65'	Report	Matthews (yellow card) 20'; Love (yellow card) 30'; Walton (yellow card) 68'	Stadium: Whaddon Road; Attendance: 3,284; Referee: Abigail Byrne

13 September 2025 8	Accrington Stanley	1–0	Colchester United	Accrington
12:30 BST	Smith (yellow card) 30'; Sinclair 32'; Love (yellow card) 70'	Report	Araujo (yellow card) 45+3'; Gape (yellow card) 60'; Williams (yellow card) 70'; Edwards (red card) 86'	Stadium: Crown Ground; Attendance: 2,107 (199 CUFC); Referee: Martin Coy
Note: Fixture was originally scheduled for a 15:00 kick-off, but was moved live Sky Sports broadcasting.

20 September 2025 9	Milton Keynes Dons	1–2	Accrington Stanley	Denbigh
15:00 BST	Kelly (yellow card) 17'; Offord (yellow card) 45' (yellow-red card) 90+5'; Gilbey 48', (yellow card) 90+5'; Lemonheigh-Evans (yellow card) 52'	Report	Sinclair 19'; Heath (yellow card) 27'; Conneely (yellow card) 38'; Caton 73'	Stadium: Stadium MK; Attendance: 6,010 (100 from ASFC); Referee: Scott Jackson

27 September 2025 10	Accrington Stanley	1–3	Walsall	Accrington
15:00 BST	Caton 90+1'	Report	Flint (yellow card) 53', (goal) 62'; Pressley 75'; Adomah 90+3'	Stadium: Crown Ground; Attendance: 2,448 (696 WFC fans); Referee: Ross Joyce

4 October 2025 11	Barnet	2–0	Accrington Stanley	Edgware
15:00 BST	Stead 21'; Osadebe (yellow card) 23'; Glover 78'	Report	Matthews (yellow card) 53'; Brown (yellow card) 63'; Ward (yellow card) 67'	Stadium: The Hive Stadium; Attendance: 2,058 (155 ASFC fans); Referee: Neil Hair

11 October 2025 12	Accrington Stanley	0–1	Newport County	Accrington
15:00 BST	Love (yellow card) 13'	Report	Sinclair 43' (o.g.); Braybrooke (yellow card) 80'	Stadium: Crown Ground; Attendance: 2,074 (172 NCFC fans); Referee: David Rock

18 October 2025 13	Accrington Stanley	4–0	Swindon Town	Accrington
15:00 BST	Madden 8', 72', 90+3'; Heath 79'	Report	Knight-Lebel (yellow card) 6'; Clarke (red card) 37'; Ripley (yellow card) 38'; Kilkenny (yellow card) 45+1'	Stadium: Crown Ground; Attendance: 2,084 (537 STFC fans); Referee: Alan Young

25 October 2025 14	Fleetwood Town	2–1	Accrington Stanley	Fleetwood
12:30 BST	Davies (yellow card) 22'; Graydon 65', (penalty missed) 80'; Evans 71'	Report	Henderson 11', (yellow card) 67'; O'Brien (yellow card) 74'; Coyle (yellow card) 81'	Stadium: Highbury Stadium; Attendance: 2,552 (367 from ASFC); Referee: Tom Reeves
Note: Fixture was originally scheduled for a 15:00 kick-off, but was rescheduled for live Sky Sports broadcasting.

28 October 2025 4	Accrington Stanley	1–1	Tranmere Rovers	Accrington
19:45 GMT	Whalley 16'; Madden (penalty missed) 65'; Heath (yellow card) 90+3'	Report	Whitaker 63'; Norman (yellow card) 64'; Blacker (yellow card) 78'	Stadium: Crown Ground; Attendance: 2,375 (887 TRFC fans); Referee: Martin Woods
Note: Fixture was originally scheduled for 19 August, but was postponed due to Tranmere's EFL Cup first round tie being rescheduled.

8 November 2025 15	Chesterfield	3–3	Accrington Stanley	Chesterfield
15:00 GMT	Fleck (yellow card) 23'; Berry (yellow card) 37', (goal) 62'; Naylor 45+4'; Bonis 47', (penalty missed) 90+4'; McFadzean (yellow card) 55'	Report	Walton 17', 26'; Whalley (yellow card) 24'; Matthews (yellow card) 33'; Caton 75'; Bauress (yellow card) 88'; Love (yellow card) 90+1'; Conneely (yellow card) 90+3'	Stadium: SMH Group Stadium; Attendance: 7,822 (124 ASFC fans); Referee: Thomas Parsons

15 November 2025 16	Accrington Stanley	3–1	Bristol Rovers	Accrington
15:00 GMT	Heath 6'; Walton (yellow card) 40'; Whalley (yellow card) 60'; Ward (yellow card) 62'; Rawson 72'; Sinclair 77'	Report	Chang (yellow card) 23'; Forde (yellow card) 26'; Mola (yellow card) 40'; Conteh 59'	Stadium: Crown Ground; Attendance: 2,558 (445 BRFC fans); Referee: Seb Stockbridge

22 November 2025 17	Crawley Town	1–1	Accrington Stanley	Crawley
15:00 GMT	Flower (yellow card) 20'; Tshimanga 65'; Forster (yellow card) 88'; Barker (yellow card) 90+4'	Report	Whalley (yellow card) 16'; Heath 28'; Henderson (yellow card) 82'	Stadium: Broadfield Stadium; Attendance: 2,885 (90 ASFC fans); Referee: Alex Chilowicz

29 November 2025 18	Accrington Stanley	1–0	Oldham Athletic	Accrington
12:30 GMT	Rawson (yellow card) 21'; Robson 31' (o.g.); Matthews (yellow card) 66'; Madden (yellow card) 88'; Wright (yellow card) 90+3'	Report	Drummond (yellow card) 64'; Caprice (yellow card) 71'	Stadium: Crown Ground; Attendance: 3,031 (1,288 from OAFC); Referee: Simon Mather
Note: Fixture was originally scheduled for a 15:00 kick-off, but was rescheduled for live Sky Sports broadcasting.

9 December 2025 19	Harrogate Town	0–2	Accrington Stanley	Harrogate
19:45 GMT	Sutton (yellow card) 20'; Fox (yellow card) 82'	Report	Madden 45', (yellow card) 90+2'; Ward 65'	Stadium: Wetherby Road; Attendance: 2,307; Referee: Richard Eley

13 December 2025 20	Accrington Stanley	0–1	Bromley	Accrington
15:00 GMT	Conneely (yellow card) 73'	Report	Hondermarck (yellow card) 45+1'; Elerewe (yellow card) 65', (goal) 89'	Stadium: Crown Ground; Attendance: 1,669 (137 away); Referee: Steven Copeland

19 December 2025 21	Cambridge United	2–0	Accrington Stanley	Cambridge
19:45 GMT	Watts (yellow card) 32'; Gibbons 45+5'; Kaikai 60'	Report		Stadium: Abbey Stadium; Attendance: 5,788; Referee: Richie Watkins
Note: Fixture was originally scheduled for 20 December, but was moved following an agreement between the two sides.

26 December 2025 22	Accrington Stanley	2–1	Barrow	Accrington
15:00 GMT	Ward 30'; Woods 90'	Report	Gordon (yellow card) 36'; McCann 41', (yellow card) 57'	Stadium: Crown Ground; Attendance: 2,980 (495 away); Referee: Scott Jackson

29 December 2025 23	Accrington Stanley	1–0	Harrogate Town	Accrington
19:45 GMT	Whalley 45+1' (pen.); Love (yellow card) 90+5'	Report	Slater (red card) 59'	Stadium: Crown Ground; Attendance: 1,995 (247 away); Referee: Declan Brown

1 January 2026 24	Notts County	0–1	Accrington Stanley	Nottingham
15:00 GMT	Platt (yellow card) 16'; Jatta (yellow card) 45+3'; Bedeau (yellow card) 90'; Iorpenda (yellow card) 90+4'; Dennis (yellow card) 90+6'	Report	Henderson (yellow card) 11'; Woods (yellow card) 35'; Whalley (yellow card) 45+3', (goal) 72'; Love (yellow card) 70'	Stadium: Meadow Lane; Attendance: 10,239 (218 away); Referee: Zac Kennard-Kettle

17 January 2026 27	Accrington Stanley	0–2	Milton Keynes Dons	Accrington
15:00 GMT	Whalley (yellow card) 8'; Matthews (yellow card) 66'	Report	Wiles 14'; Collins 45+4'; Kelly (yellow card) 62'; Hogan (yellow card) 70'	Stadium: Crown Ground; Attendance: 2,006 (325 from MK); Referee: Ross Martin

24 January 2026 28	Walsall	0–0	Accrington Stanley	Walsall
15:00 GMT	Barrett (yellow card) 8'; Comley (yellow card) 24'; Flint (yellow card) 42'; Farquharson (yellow card) 67'; Loupalo-Bi (yellow card) 89'	Report	Heath (yellow card) 30'; Love (yellow card) 69'; Sinclair (yellow card) 74'	Stadium: Bescot Stadium; Attendance: 5,682; Referee: Elliott Swallow

27 January 2026 29	Newport County	1–4	Accrington Stanley	Newport
19:45 GMT	Opoku 35', (yellow card) 65' (yellow-red card) 69'; Spellman (yellow card) 45+1'; Lloyd (yellow card) 58'	Report	Henderson 2'; Matthews (yellow card) 28'; Grant (yellow card) 32'; O'Brien (yellow card) 40'; Sinclair 51'; Madden 82'; Heath 90+2'; Rawson (yellow card) 90+6'; Conneely (yellow card) 90+8'	Stadium: Rodney Parade; Attendance: 3,563; Referee: James Durkin

31 January 2026 30	Accrington Stanley	3–1	Cheltenham Town	Accrington
15:00 GMT	Whalley 8'; Love 45+2'; Henderson (yellow card) 55'; Matthews 59'	Report	Cundy (yellow card) 45+1'; Thomas 73'; Davison (yellow card) 77'	Stadium: Crown Ground; Attendance: 2,052 (171 CTFC fans); Referee: Stephen Parkinson

5 February 2026 31	Accrington Stanley	1–0	Salford City	Accrington
20:00 GMT	Henderson 4'; O'Brien (yellow card) 64'	Report	Grant (yellow card) 13'	Stadium: Crown Ground; Attendance: 1,892 (364 Salford fans); Referee: Darren Drysdale
Note: Fixture was originally scheduled for 7 February, but was rescheduled for live Sky Sports broadcasting.

11 February 2026 32	Grimsby Town	1–0	Accrington Stanley	Cleethorpes
19:45 GMT	McJannet (yellow card) 54'; Sellars-Fleming 58'	Report	Matthews (red card) 86'; Brown (yellow card) 90+2'; Love (yellow card) 90+3'	Stadium: Blundell Park; Referee: Abigail Byrne
Note: Fixture was initially scheduled for 14 February, but was rearranged due to Grimsby's FA Cup progression to the fourth round.

17 February 2026 33	Tranmere Rovers	0–1	Accrington Stanley	Birkenhead
19:45 GMT	Warrington (yellow card) 51'	Report	Love (yellow card) 29'; Madden 48', (yellow card) 80'; Butterfield (red card) 63'; Heath (yellow card) 90+1'; Woods (red card) 90+5'	Stadium: Prenton Park; Attendance: 5,585 (169 ASFC); Referee: Edward Duckworth

21 February 2026 34	Accrington Stanley	0–2	Shrewsbury Town	Accrington
15:00 GMT	Heath (yellow card) 52'; Conneely (yellow card) 61'; Smith (yellow card) 74'	Report	Morgan 1'; Hoole 48'	Stadium: Crown Ground; Attendance: 2,342 (547 STFC fans); Referee: Ross Joyce

24 February 2026 26	Accrington Stanley	0–1	Barnet	Accrington
19:45 GMT	Conneely (yellow card) 36'	Report	Tshimanga 81'	Stadium: Crown Ground; Attendance: 1,510 (88 BFC fans); Referee: Michael Barlow
Note: Fixture was originally scheduled for 10 January, but it was postponed due to a frozen pitch.

28 February 2026 35	Bromley	2–1	Accrington Stanley	Bromley
15:00 GMT	Arthurs (yellow card) 1'; Cheek 45+1' (pen.), 52' (pen.)	Report	Love (red card) 14'; Madden (yellow card) 45'; Abimbola 45+3'	Stadium: Hayes Lane; Attendance: 4,307; Referee: Andrew Humphries

7 March 2026 36	Accrington Stanley	1–1	Cambridge United	Accrington
15:00 GMT	Rawson 25'; Grant (yellow card) 67'; Sass (yellow card) 84'	Report	Appéré 81'	Stadium: Crown Ground; Attendance: 2,322 (463 away); Referee: Jamie O'Connor

14 March 2026 37	Barrow	0–0	Accrington Stanley	Barrow-in-Furness
15:00 GMT	Shipley (yellow card) 30'; McCann (yellow card) 31'	Report	Butterfield (yellow card) 40'; Woods (yellow card) 72'; Martin (yellow card) 90+3'	Stadium: Holker Street; Attendance: 2,417; Referee: Martin Coy

17 March 2026 38	Accrington Stanley	0–4	Notts County	Accrington
19:45 GMT	Martin (yellow card) 88'	Report	Jones 9'; Tsaroulla (yellow card) 23'; Bennetts 31'; Grant 68'; Hall 83'	Stadium: Crown Ground; Attendance: 1,863 (538 away fans); Referee: Oliver Yates

21 March 2026 39	Accrington Stanley	0–1	Chesterfield	Accrington
15:00 GMT	Whalley (yellow card) 28'; Martin (yellow card) 58'	Report	Braybrooke (yellow card) 5'; Dickson 63'	Stadium: Crown Ground; Attendance: 2,688 (836 Chesterfield); Referee: Harry Wager

28 March 2026 40	Bristol Rovers	2–0	Accrington Stanley	Bristol
15:00 GMT	Harbottle 5', (yellow card) 49'; Sparkes 53'; Rijks (yellow card) 67'	Report	Matthews (yellow card) 52'; Sass (yellow card) 80'; Walton (yellow card) 83'	Stadium: Memorial Stadium; Attendance: 8,805 (55 ASFC); Referee: Benjamin Speedie

3 April 2026 41	Accrington Stanley	2–0	Crewe Alexandra	Accrington
15:00 BST	Sass (yellow card) 45+2', (goal) 51'; Conneely 56', (yellow card) 62'; Love (yellow card) 87'	Report	March (yellow card) 30'	Stadium: Crown Ground; Attendance: 2,790 (858 Crewe); Referee: Oliver Mackey

6 April 2026 42	Gillingham	2–0	Accrington Stanley	Gillingham
15:00 BST	Hale (yellow card) 11'; Khumbeni (yellow card) 24'; Smith 36'; McCleary (yellow card) 42', (goal) 56'	Report	Wright (yellow card) 11'; Woods (yellow card) 33'; Walton (yellow card) 75', (red card) 81'; Madden (yellow card) 80'; Abimbola (red card) 90+5'	Stadium: Priestfield Stadium; Attendance: 5,383; Referee: George Laflin

11 April 2026 43	Accrington Stanley	1–2	Fleetwood Town	Accrington
15:00 BST	Woods 51'; Matthews (yellow card) 72'; Coyle (yellow card) 90+4'	Report	Davies (yellow card) 9'; Helm 12'; Haughey (yellow card) 67'; Osong 90+1'	Stadium: Crown Ground; Attendance: 1,993 (385 away); Referee: Richie Watkins

14 April 2026 25	Colchester United	2–1	Accrington Stanley	Colchester
19:45 BST	Goodwin (yellow card) 28', (goal) 43'; Read (yellow card) 31'; Hunt (yellow card) 72'; Payne 86'; Tucker (yellow card) 90+7'	Report	Whalley 33'; Woods (yellow card) 63'	Stadium: Colchester Community Stadium; Attendance: 4,298; Referee: Jacob Miles
Note: Fixture was originally scheduled for 4 January, but it was postponed due to a frozen pitch.

18 April 2026 44	Swindon Town	2–2	Accrington Stanley	Swindon
12:30 BST	Palmer 18'; Drinan 20'	Report	Woods 1'; Coyle (yellow card) 63'; Butterfield 90+2'	Stadium: County Ground; Attendance: 8,435; Referee: Declan Brown
Note: Fixture was initially scheduled for a 15:00 kick-off, but was brought forward for Sky Sports broadcasting.

25 April 2026 45	Accrington Stanley	3–3	Crawley Town	Accrington
15:00 BST	Woods 23', 64'; Sinclair 49'; Walton (yellow card) 90'	Report	Forster 37'; Richards 58'; Williams 71'; Barker (yellow card) 90+8'	Stadium: Crown Ground; Attendance: 2,240 (260 from Crawley); Referee: Kirsty Dowle

=== FA Cup ===
Accrington were drawn away to Gainsborough Trinity in the first round and at home to Mansfield Town in the second round.

Win Draw Loss Fixtures

2 November 2025 First round	Gainsborough Trinity	1–2 (a.e.t.)	Accrington Stanley	Gainsborough
17:15 GMT	Robson (yellow card) 30'; Tuntulwana 76'; Mulhern (yellow card) 89'; Johnson (yellow card) 90'	Report	Madden 29'; Heath (yellow card) 71'; Caton 95'	Stadium: The Northolme; Referee: Andrew Humphries

6 December 2025 Second round	Accrington Stanley	2–2 (1–3 p)	Mansfield Town	Accrington
15:00 GMT	Heath 27'; Madden 102'	Report	Cargill (yellow card) 22'; Evans 53'; Reed (yellow card) 72'; Moriah-Welsh (yellow card) 76'; McLaughlin (yellow card) 90+1'; McAdam 105+2'	Stadium: Crown Ground; Attendance: 1,873 (861 MTFC fans); Referee: Stephen Parkinson
	Penalties
	Bauress (penalty missed); Brown (penalty scored); Ward (penalty missed); Heath (penalty missed)		Akins (penalty scored); Oshilaja (penalty scored); Reed (penalty scored)

=== EFL Cup ===
Accrington Stanley would take part in a Preliminary Round of the EFL Cup due to the number of Premier League teams being involved in European competitions. They would face Oldham Athletic. In the first round proper, they were drawn again at home against Peterborough United. Then against Doncaster Rovers in the second round.

Win Draw Loss Fixtures

5 August 2025 Preliminary round	Accrington Stanley	3–1	Oldham Athletic	Accrington
19:45 BST	Popoola 10'; Mooney 17'; Woods 34'; Brown (yellow card) 52'	Report	Ogle 63'; Morris (yellow card) 71'	Stadium: Crown Ground; Attendance: 2,042; Referee: Scott Oldham

12 August 2025 First round	Accrington Stanley	2–1	Peterborough United	Accrington
19:45 BST	Henderson 1', (yellow card) 36'; Pye (yellow card) 21'; Mooney 25'; Martin (yellow card) 31'; Brown (yellow card) 45+1'; Love (yellow card) 66'; Sass (yellow card) 90+2'	Report	Lolos (yellow card) 45'; Lisbie (yellow card) 56'; Collins 79'	Stadium: Crown Ground; Attendance: 847 (233 PUFC); Referee: Aaron Bannister

26 August 2025 Second round	Accrington Stanley	0–2	Doncaster Rovers	Accrington
19:45 BST	Woods (yellow card) 65' (yellow-red card) 71'	Report	Bailey 75'; Close 82'	Stadium: Crown Ground; Attendance: 1,270 (568 DRFC); Referee: Zac Kennard-Kettle

=== EFL Trophy ===
Accrington were drawn against Fleetwood Town, Port Vale and Leeds United U21 in the group stage.

Pos	Div	Team	Pld	W	PW	PL	L	GF	GA	GD	Pts	Qualification
1	L1	Port Vale	3	2	0	1	0	9	4	+5	7	Advance to Round 2
2	L2	Fleetwood Town	3	1	2	0	0	9	5	+4	7	Advance to Round 2
3	L2	Accrington Stanley	3	1	0	1	1	5	6	−1	4	
4	ACA	Leeds United U21	3	0	0	0	3	3	11	−8	0	

Source: EFL

Win Draw Loss Fixtures

2 September 2025 North Group G	Fleetwood Town	2–2 (5–4 p)	Accrington Stanley	Fleetwood
19:00 BST	Norwood 37', (yellow card) 55'; Mullarkey (yellow card) 73'; Ennis 75'; Kelly (yellow card) 76'; J. Davies (yellow card) 90+5'	Report	Heath 3'; Mooney (penalty missed) 9'; Henderson 32'; Smith (yellow card) 47'; Sinclair (yellow card) 78'	Stadium: Highbury Stadium; Attendance: 550; Referee: Peter Wright
	Penalties
	W. Davies (penalty missed); J. Davies (penalty scored); Helm (penalty scored); Ennis (penalty missed); Norwood (penalty scored); Devonport (penalty scored); Johnson (penalty scored)		(penalty missed) Madden; (penalty missed) Woods; (penalty scored) Popoola; (penalty scored) Caton; (penalty scored) Heath; (penalty scored) Love; (penalty missed) Sinclair

7 October 2025 North Group G	Accrington Stanley	0–2	Port Vale	Accrington
19:45 BST	Love (yellow card) 45'; Madden (yellow card) 48'; Kelly (yellow card) 78'; Ward (red card) 78'; Matthews (yellow card) 88'; Pye (yellow card) 90+2'	Report	Hall 82'; Faal 85'	Stadium: Crown Ground; Attendance: 649 (164 PVFC fans); Referee: Rob Massey-Ellis

11 November 2025 North Group G	Accrington Stanley	3–2	Leeds United U21	Accrington
19:45 GMT	Woods 68'; Pickles 78' (o.g.); Bauress 81'	Report	Gray 3', 90'; Lopata-White (red card) 40'	Stadium: Crown Ground; Attendance: 418 (LUFC fans); Referee: Aaron Bannister

== Statistics ==
=== Appearances and goals ===
As of match played 18 April 2026

Players with no appearances are not included on the list; italics indicate a loaned in player

No.	Pos	Nat	Player	Total		League Two		FA Cup		EFL Cup		EFL Trophy	
No.	Pos	Nat	Player	Apps	Goals	Apps	Goals	Apps	Goals	Apps	Goals	Apps	Goals
1	GK	(Republic of Ireland) IRL	Michael Kelly	6	0	3+0	0	0+0	0	1+0	0	2+0	0
2	DF	(Scotland) SCO	Donald Love	40	1	30+3	1	2+0	0	0+2	0	2+1	0
3	DF	(England) ENG	Freddie Sass	30	1	15+11	1	0+1	0	3+0	0	0+0	0
4	MF	(England) ENG	Conor Grant	27	0	16+8	0	1+1	0	0+0	0	1+0	0
5	DF	(England) ENG	Farrend Rawson	34	2	30+0	2	2+0	0	2+0	0	0+0	0
6	MF	(Northern Ireland) NIR	Liam Coyle	26	0	15+6	0	2+0	0	0+2	0	1+0	0
7	FW	(England) ENG	Shaun Whalley	32	4	30+0	4	2+0	0	0+0	0	0+0	0
8	FW	(Republic of Ireland) IRL	Paddy Madden	36	8	23+7	6	2+0	2	0+1	0	1+2	0
9	FW	(England) ENG	Kelsey Mooney	9	2	1+4	0	0+0	0	3+0	2	1+0	0
10	MF	(England) ENG	Alex Henderson	31	5	15+10	3	0+0	0	3+0	1	3+0	1
11	MF	(England) ENG	Isaac Sinclair	42	4	33+2	4	2+0	0	0+3	0	0+2	0
13	GK	(England) ENG	Ollie Wright	44	0	40+0	0	2+0	0	2+0	0	0+0	0
17	DF	(England) ENG	Devon Matthews	44	1	36+1	1	2+0	0	3+0	0	2+0	0
18	FW	(Wales) WAL	Charlie Caton	28	4	8+13	3	0+2	1	1+1	0	1+2	0
19	FW	(England) ENG	Anjola Popoola	12	1	1+6	0	0+0	0	3+0	1	1+1	0
20	FW	(England) ENG	Charlie Brown	29	0	15+10	0	0+1	0	2+0	0	1+0	0
21	GK	(England) ENG	James Rogerson	1	0	0+0	0	0+0	0	0+0	0	1+0	0
22	MF	(England) ENG	Dan Martin	14	0	5+5	0	0+0	0	1+0	0	3+0	0
23	FW	(England) ENG	Tyler Walton	16	5	10+4	5	1+0	0	0+1	0	0+0	0
24	MF	(Scotland) SCO	Luke Butterfield	10	1	6+4	1	0+0	0	0+0	0	0+0	0
25	DF	(England) ENG	Josh Smith	11	0	8+0	0	0+0	0	0+0	0	2+1	0
26	MF	(England) ENG	Charlie Hall	2	0	0+2	0	0+0	0	0+0	0	0+0	0
27	FW	(England) ENG	David Abimbola	11	1	3+8	1	0+0	0	0+0	0	0+0	0
28	MF	(Republic of Ireland) IRL	Seamus Conneely	38	1	22+11	1	0+1	0	2+0	0	2+0	0
30	FW	(England) ENG	Isaac Heath	33	6	30+0	4	2+0	1	0+0	0	1+0	1
31	MF	(England) ENG	Finlay Tunstall	4	0	0+0	0	0+0	0	1+2	0	0+1	0
38	DF	(Republic of Ireland) IRL	Connor O'Brien	30	0	22+6	0	0+1	0	0+0	0	1+0	0
39	FW	(England) ENG	Josh Woods	36	5	19+10	3	0+1	0	2+1	1	2+1	1
Players who featured but departed the club during the season:
8	MF	(England) ENG	Ben Woods	1	0	1+0	0	0+0	0	0+0	0	0+0	0
14	DF	(England) ENG	Benn Ward	27	2	23+0	2	2+0	0	1+0	0	1+0	0
15	DF	(England) ENG	Logan Pye	8	0	3+0	0	0+0	0	2+0	0	3+0	0
16	MF	(England) ENG	Joe Bauress	21	1	10+7	0	0+2	0	1+0	0	1+0	1

=== Disciplinary record ===
As of match played 18 April 2026

Rank	No.	Nat.	Po.	Name	League Two			FA Cup			EFL Cup			EFL Trophy			Total		
Rank	No.	Nat.	Po.	Name	Yellow card	(yellow card) (yellow-red card)	Red card	Yellow card	(yellow card) (yellow-red card)	Red card	Yellow card	(yellow card) (yellow-red card)	Red card	Yellow card	(yellow card) (yellow-red card)	Red card	Yellow card	(yellow card) (yellow-red card)	Red card
1	2	(England)	RB	Donald Love	12	0	1	0	0	0	2	0	0	1	0	0	15	0	1
2	17	(England)	CB	Devon Matthews	10	0	1	0	0	0	0	0	0	1	0	0	11	0	1
3	23	(England)	RM	Tyler Walton	6	0	1	0	0	0	0	0	0	0	0	0	6	0	1
4	39	(England)	CF	Josh Woods	3	0	1	0	0	0	0	1	0	0	0	0	3	1	1
5	10	(England)	CAM	Alex Henderson	6	0	0	0	0	0	1	0	0	0	0	0	7	0	0
5	28	(Republic of Ireland)	CDM	Seamus Conneely	7	0	0	0	0	0	0	0	0	0	0	0	7	0	0
7	7	(England)	RW	Shaun Whalley	6	0	0	0	0	0	0	0	0	0	0	0	6	0	0
7	8	(Republic of Ireland)	CF	Paddy Madden	5	0	0	0	0	0	0	0	0	1	0	0	6	0	0
7	30	(England)	LW	Isaac Heath	5	0	0	1	0	0	0	0	0	0	0	0	6	0	0
10	14	(England)	CB	Benn Ward	2	0	0	0	0	0	0	0	0	0	0	1	2	0	1
10	20	(England)	CF	Charlie Brown	3	0	0	0	0	0	2	0	0	0	0	0	5	0	0
12	3	(England)	LB	Freddie Sass	3	0	0	0	0	0	1	0	0	0	0	0	4	0	0
12	22	(England)	CAM	Dan Martin	3	0	0	0	0	0	1	0	0	0	0	0	4	0	0
12	24	(Scotland)	CDM	Luke Butterfield	1	0	1	0	0	0	0	0	0	0	0	0	1	0	1
15	4	(England)	CM	Conor Grant	3	0	0	0	0	0	0	0	0	0	0	0	3	0	0
15	5	(England)	RB	Farrend Rawson	3	0	0	0	0	0	0	0	0	0	0	0	3	0	0
15	6	(Northern Ireland)	CDM	Liam Coyle	3	0	0	0	0	0	0	0	0	0	0	0	3	0	0
15	11	(England)	RM	Isaac Sinclair	2	0	0	0	0	0	0	0	0	1	0	0	3	0	0
15	27	(England)	CF	David Abimbola	0	0	1	0	0	0	0	0	0	0	0	0	0	0	1
15	38	(Republic of Ireland)	RB	Connor O'Brien	3	0	0	0	0	0	0	0	0	0	0	0	3	0	0
21	1	(Republic of Ireland)	GK	Michael Kelly	0	0	0	0	0	0	0	0	0	2	0	0	2	0	0
21	13	(England)	GK	Ollie Wright	2	0	0	0	0	0	0	0	0	0	0	0	2	0	0
21	15	(England)	LB	Logan Pye	0	0	0	0	0	0	1	0	0	1	0	0	2	0	0
21	16	(England)	CM	Joe Bauress	2	0	0	0	0	0	0	0	0	0	0	0	2	0	0
21	25	(England)	CB	Josh Smith	2	0	0	0	0	0	0	0	0	0	0	0	2	0	0
Total					92	0	5	1	0	0	8	1	0	8	0	1	109	1	7
