= Gary Bauress =

English footballer

Personal information
- Full name: Gary Bauress
- Date of birth: 19 January 1971 (age 55)
- Place of birth: Liverpool, England
- Position: Midfielder

Senior career*
Years	Team	Apps	(Gls)
1989–1990	Tranmere Rovers	1	(0)
1991–1995	Stalybridge Celtic	113	(10)
1996–1997	Leek Town	61	(6)
1997–2001	Stalybridge Celtic	78	(8)
- * Club domestic league appearances and goals

Gary Bauress (born 19 January 1971) is an English footballer, who played as a midfielder in the Football League for Tranmere Rovers.

== Personal life ==
Bauress is the father of the footballer Joe Bauress.
