= Logan Pye =

English footballer (born 2003)

Personal information
- Full name: Logan Pye
- Date of birth: 26 October 2003 (age 23)
- Place of birth: Sunderland, England
- Height: 1.78 m (5 ft 10 in)
- Position: Defender

Team information
- Current team: Spennymoor Town
- Number: 28

Youth career
- –2020: Sunderland
- 2020–2023: Manchester United
- 2023–2025: Burnley

Senior career*
| Years | Team | Apps | (Gls) |
| 2025–2026 | Burnley | 0 | (0) |
| 2025–2026 | → Accrington Stanley (loan) | 3 | (0) |
| 2026 | Darlington | 4 | (0) |
| 2026– | Spennymoor Town | 0 | (0) |

International career
| 2018–2019 | England U16 | 5 | (0) |
- * Club domestic league appearances and goals as of 12:49, 3 October 2026 (UTC)

Logan Pye (born 26 October 2003) is an English professional footballer who plays as a defender for National League North club Spennymoor Town.

== Career ==
Born in Sunderland, Pye began his career with Sundeland, moving to Manchester United in 2020, and to Burnley in 2023.

He signed a new one-year contract in May 2025, and moved on loan to Accrington Stanley in August 2025.

On 9 August 2025, Pye made his professional league debut for Accrington Stanley against Crewe Alexandra in a 2–0 loss. He left Burnley at the end of the season.

On 29 August 2026, Pye signed a short-term deal with Darlington. On 21 September 2026, it was announced that Pye had been released by the club. On 24 October 2026, he joined National League North side Spennymoor Town on a short-term deal until January 2027.

== Career statistics ==
As of 3 November 2026

Appearances and goals by club, season and competition
| Club | Season | League | | | FA Cup | | League Cup | | Other | | Total | |
| Club | Season | Division | Apps | Goals | Apps | Goals | Apps | Goals | Apps | Goals | Apps | Goals |
|---|---|---|---|---|---|---|---|---|---|---|---|---|
| Manchester United U21 | 2020–21 | — | | | — | | — | | 1 (Note: Appearance(s) in EFL Trophy) | 0 | 1 | 0 |
| Burnley | 2025–26 | Premier League | 0 | 0 | 0 | 0 | 0 | 0 | — | | 0 | 0 |
| Accrington Stanley (loan) | 2025–26 | League Two | 3 | 0 | 0 | 0 | 2 | 0 | 3 | 0 | 8 | 0 |
| Darlington | 2026–27 | National League North | 4 | 0 | 0 | 0 | 0 | 0 | 0 | 0 | 4 | 0 |
| Career total | | | 7 | 0 | 0 | 0 | 2 | 0 | 4 | 0 | 13 | 0 |
