= Luke Butterfield =

Scottish footballer (born 2003)

Personal information
- Full name: Luke Joseph Butterfield
- Date of birth: 29 September 2003 (age 23)
- Place of birth: Yorkshire, England
- Height: 1.89 m (6 ft 2 in)
- Position: Midfielder

Team information
- Current team: AFC Fylde (on loan from Chesterfield)
- Number: 26

Youth career
- Blackburn Rovers
- 2014–2025: Everton

Senior career*
Years	Team	Apps	(Gls)
2025–	Chesterfield	3	(0)
2026	→ Accrington Stanley (loan)	13	(1)
2026–	→ AFC Fylde (loan)	0	(0)

International career
2019	Scotland U16	1	(0)
2021–2022	Scotland U19	5	(1)
- * Club domestic league appearances and goals as of 16:55, 3 May 2026 (UTC)

Luke Joseph Butterfield (born 29 September 2003) is a professional footballer who plays as a midfielder for AFC Fylde, on loan from Chesterfield. Born in England, he has represented Scotland at youth international level.

== Club career ==
=== Everton ===
Butterfield joined the Everton Academy at under-12s level from Blackburn Rovers, progressing through the ranks to sign a scholarship deal in August 2020. In October 2022, he signed a new three-year deal with the club.

In September 2024, he was named in the first-team squad for the first time, remaining an unused substitute in an EFL Cup defeat to Southampton. He departed the club upon the expiry of his contract at the end of the 2024–25 season.

=== Chesterfield ===
On 18 July 2025, following a trial, Butterfield joined League Two club Chesterfield on a two-year deal.

On 13 August 2025, Butterfield made his senior debut as a second-half substitute in a 2–0 EFL Cup defeat to local rivals Mansfield Town. During the match, he suffered a broken foot that would ultimately rule him out until December. He later underwent an operation, He made his league debut on 9 December 2025, coming off of the bench in a 1–1 draw with Cambridge United.

On 22 January 2026, Butterfield joined fellow League Two club Accrington Stanley on loan for the remainder of the season.

He signed on loan for AFC Fylde in September 2026.

== International career ==
Butterfield is a Scottish youth international, having played for them at under-16 and Scotland under-19 levels.

== Career statistics ==
As of match played 2 May 2026

Appearances and goals by club, season and competition
Club	Season	League			FA Cup		League Cup		Other		Total	
Club	Season	Division	Apps	Goals	Apps	Goals	Apps	Goals	Apps	Goals	Apps	Goals
Everton U21	2021–22	—			—		—		2 (Note: Appearance(s) in EFL Trophy)	0	2	0
Everton U21	2022–23	—			—		—		1	0	1	0
Everton U21	2023–24	—			—		—		2	0	2	0
Everton U21	2024–25	—			—		—		2	0	2	0
Everton U21	Total				—		—		7	0	7	0
Chesterfield	2025–26	League Two	3	0	0	0	1	0	1	0	5	0
Chesterfield	2026–27	League Two	0	0	0	0	0	0	0	0	0	0
Chesterfield	Total		3	0	0	0	1	0	1	0	5	0
Accrington Stanley (loan)	2025–26	League Two	13	1	0	0	0	0	0	0	13	1
AFC Fylde (loan)	2026–27	National League	0	0	0	0	0	0	0	0	0	0
Career total			16	1	0	0	1	0	8	0	25	1
