= Michael Kelly (footballer, born 1996) =

Irish footballer (born 1996)

Personal information
- Full name: Michael Sean Kelly
- Date of birth: 13 July 1996 (age 30)
- Place of birth: Leixlip, Ireland
- Height: 1.96 m (6 ft 5 in)
- Position: Goalkeeper

Youth career
- Confey
- Cherry Orchard
- Dunboyne

Senior career*
Years	Team	Apps	(Gls)
2014	Shamrock Rovers II	5	(0)
2015	Shamrock Rovers	0	(0)
2016–2017	Cabinteely	50	(0)
2018	Longford Town	26	(0)
2019	Bohemians	0	(0)
2020	Cabinteely	6	(0)
2021	Longford Town	9	(0)
2022	Bray Wanderers	8	(0)
2022–2023	Carlisle United	0	(0)
2023–2024	Milton Keynes Dons	15	(0)
2024–2026	Accrington Stanley	15	(0)
- * Club domestic league appearances and goals as of 16:21, 4 May 2026 (UTC)

Michael Sean Kelly (born 13 July 1996) is an Irish professional footballer who plays as a goalkeeper.

== Career ==
A native of Confey in Leixlip, Kelly began playing with local side Confey FC, before continuing his youth football with Cherry Orchard and Dunboyne. He then played senior football in the League of Ireland for Shamrock Rovers II, Cabinteely, Longford Town, Bohemians and Bray Wanderers, before signing for English club Carlisle United on 30 July 2022. On 30 May 2023, it was announced that Kelly had been released by the club following their promotion, without making a league appearance during the season.

After over three months without a club, on 9 September 2023 Kelly joined League Two club Milton Keynes Dons on a short-term deal following injury to Dons goalkeeper Nathan Harness. Kelly was released by MK Dons at the end of the 2023–24 season.

On 23 May 2024, Kelly was announced to have agreed to join EFL League Two side Accrington Stanley on a two-year contract. He made his debut on 10 August 2024, in a 4–1 defeat away to Doncaster Rovers on the opening day of the season. He departed the club upon the expiry of his contract at the end of the 2025–26 season.

== Career statistics ==
As of end of 2025–26 season

Appearances and goals by club, season and competition
Club	Season	League			National Cup (Note: Includes FAI Cup & FA Cup)		League Cup (Note: Includes League of Ireland Cup & EFL Cup)		Other		Total	
Club	Season	Division	Apps	Goals	Apps	Goals	Apps	Goals	Apps	Goals	Apps	Goals
Shamrock Rovers II	2014	LOI First Division	5	0	–		–		–		5	0
Shamrock Rovers	2015	LOI Premier Division	0	0	0	0	0	0	0	0	0	0
Cabinteely	2016	LOI First Division	25	0	1	0	1	0	1 (Note: Appearances in Leinster Senior Cup)	0	28	0
Cabinteely	2017	LOI First Division	25	0	2	0	0	0	0	0	27	0
Cabinteely	Total		50	0	3	0	1	0	1	0	55	0
Longford Town	2018	LOI First Division	26	0	3	0	0	0	0	0	29	0
Bohemians	2019	LOI Premier Division	0	0	0	0	1	0	1	0	2	0
Cabinteely	2020	LOI First Division	6	0	0	0	0	0	–		6	0
Longford Town	2021	LOI Premier Division	9	0	1	0	–		–		10	0
Bray Wanderers	2022	LOI First Division	8	0	0	0	–		–		8	0
Carlisle United	2022–23	EFL League Two	0	0	0	0	0	0	3 (Note: Appearance(s) in the EFL Trophy)	0	3	0
Milton Keynes Dons	2023–24	EFL League Two	15	0	1	0	–		4 (Note: 3 appearances in the EFL Trophy, 1 appearance in the play-offs)	0	20	0
Accrington Stanley	2024–25	EFL League Two	12	0	0	0	1	0	2	0	15	0
Accrington Stanley	2025–26	EFL League Two	3	0	0	0	1	0	2	0	6	0
Accrington Stanley	Total		15	0	0	0	2	0	4	0	21	0
Career total			142	0	8	0	4	0	13	0	167	0

== Honours ==
Carlisle United

- EFL League Two play-offs: 2023
