= Adler Nascimento =

Portuguese association football player

Personal information
- Full name: Adler Bruno Sá Nogueira de Nascimento
- Date of birth: 25 November 2004 (age 21)
- Place of birth: Portugal
- Height: 1.83 m (6 ft 0 in)
- Position: Striker

Team information
- Current team: Crystal Palace
- Number: 47

Youth career
- 2014–2021: Peterborough United
- 2021–2022: Crystal Palace

Senior career*
Years	Team	Apps	(Gls)
2021	Peterborough United	1	(0)
2022–	Crystal Palace	0	(0)
- * Club domestic league appearances and goals as of 01:27, 20 July 2021 (UTC)

Adler Bruno Sá Nogueira de Nascimento (born 25 November 2004) is a Portuguese professional footballer who plays as a striker for Premier League club Crystal Palace.

Nascimento progressed through the youth ranks of Peterborough United and made his senior debut in May 2021. Shortly after, he joined Crystal Palace on a scholarship with a pre-contract agreement. He signed a professional contract in January 2022.

== Club career ==
=== Peterborough United ===
Nascimento is a product of the Peterborough United academy, having joined in 2014. Aged 15, Nascimento moved up to the under-18s and was noted for his goalscoring abilities, which included two goals in a 7–2 FA Youth Cup win against Newmarket Town and a hat-trick in a 5–0 win against Leyton Orient. In February 2021, he helped the under-18s win the EFL Youth Alliance League for a second successive season.

In February 2021, Nascimento joined the first team squad travelling to Gillingham. On 9 May 2021, he made his senior debut in the final match of the season. Nascimento replaced Frankie Kent for the last 16 minutes of a 4–1 win against Doncaster Rovers.

=== Crystal Palace ===
On 17 July 2021, Nascimento announced his exit from Peterborough United on social media. He subsequently joined Premier League club Crystal Palace for an expected £500,000 compensation fee. Director of Football Barry Fry revealed that twelve Premier League clubs had enquired for the forward, with six official bids. Nascimento signed a professional contract with Palace in January 2022.

== Personal life ==
Born in Portugal, Nascimento is of Bissau-Guinean descent.

== Career statistics ==
As of match played 22 September 2026

Appearances and goals by club, season and competition
Club	Season	League			FA Cup		EFL Cup		Other		Total	
Club	Season	Division	Apps	Goals	Apps	Goals	Apps	Goals	Apps	Goals	Apps	Goals
Peterborough United	2020–21	League One	1	0	0	0	0	0	0	0	1	0
Crystal Palace U21	2022–23	—			—		—		—		—	
Crystal Palace U21	2023–24	—			—		—		—		—	
Crystal Palace U21	2024–25	—			—		—		1 (Note: Appearance in EFL Trophy)	0	1	0
Crystal Palace U21	2025–26	—			—		—		3	1	3	1
Crystal Palace U21	2026–27	—			—		—		2	0	2	0
Total			1	0	0	0	0	0	6	1	7	1
