= Josh Smith (footballer, born 2005) =

English association professional football player (born 2005)

Personal information
- Full name: Joshua Jack Smith
- Date of birth: 17 September 2005 (age 21)
- Place of birth: Blackburn, England
- Height: 6 ft 3 in (1.91 m)
- Position: Defender

Team information
- Current team: Accrington Stanley
- Number: 25

Youth career
- 2022–2024: Accrington Stanley

Senior career*
Years	Team	Apps	(Gls)
2024–	Accrington Stanley	16	(1)
2024	→ Newcastle Town (loan)	7	(0)
2024	→ Hyde United (loan)	4	(1)
2025	→ Matlock Town (loan)	13	(2)
2025	→ Buxton (loan)	4	(1)
- * Club domestic league appearances and goals as of 16:56, 3 May 2026 (UTC)

Joshua Jack Smith (born 17 September 2005) is an English professional footballer who plays as a defender for EFL League Two club Accrington Stanley.

== Career ==
Smith joined the Accrington Stanley academy in March 2022. On 8 October 2024, he made his senior debut in a 2–1 EFL Trophy defeat to Tranmere Rovers.

On 22 January 2025, Smith joined Northern Premier League Premier Division club Matlock Town on an initial one-month loan deal. On 12 April, he returned from injury to feature in a 4–0 victory over Hyde United, however his youth loan had ended by this point. As a result, the club were deducted three points which subsequently confirmed their relegation.

On 2 August 2025, Smith made his league debut in a 1–1 opening day draw with Gillingham. On 30 September 2025, he signed an improved two-year contract.

On 4 December 2025, Smith joined National League North club Buxton on loan until 30 December.

== Career statistics ==
As of match played 11 November 2025

Appearances and goals by club, season and competition
Club	Season	League			FA Cup		League Cup		Other		Total	
Club	Season	Division	Apps	Goals	Apps	Goals	Apps	Goals	Apps	Goals	Apps	Goals
Accrington Stanley	2023–24	League Two	0	0	0	0	0	0	0	0	0	0
Accrington Stanley	2024–25	League Two	0	0	0	0	0	0	1 (Note: Appearance(s) in EFL Trophy)	0	1	0
Accrington Stanley	2025–26	League Two	6	0	0	0	0	0	3	0	9	0
Accrington Stanley	Total		6	0	0	0	0	0	4	0	10	0
Newcastle Town (loan)	2023–24	Northern Premier League West Division	7	0	0	0	—		0	0	7	0
Hyde United (loan)	2024–25	Northern Premier League Premier Division	4	1	0	0	—		1 (Note: Appearance(s) in Manchester Premier Cup)	0	5	1
Matlock Town (loan)	2024–25	Northern Premier League Premier Division	13	2	0	0	—		0	0	13	2
Career total			30	3	0	0	0	0	5	0	35	3
