= Devon Matthews =

English footballer (born 2000)

Personal information
- Full name: Devon William Matthews
- Date of birth: 4 January 2000 (age 26)
- Place of birth: Oldham, England
- Height: 1.90 m (6 ft 3 in)
- Position: Defender

Team information
- Current team: Accrington Stanley
- Number: 17

Youth career
- –2016: Oldham Athletic

Senior career*
Years	Team	Apps	(Gls)
2016–2019	Chadderton		
2019–2021	Glossop North End	33	(0)
2021–2022	Mossley	37	(1)
2022–2025	Curzon Ashton	112	(8)
2025–	Accrington Stanley	60	(1)
- * Club domestic league appearances and goals as of 16:50, 3 May 2026 (UTC)

Devon William Matthews (born 4 January 2000) is an English professional footballer who plays as a defender for EFL League Two club Accrington Stanley.

== Career ==
Born in Oldham, Matthews started his career in the Oldham Athletic youth academy. He joined Chadderton aged sixteen, where he impressed, being named captain and winning both the Players' Player and Young Player of the season for the 2018–19 season.

In July 2021, following two seasons with Glossop North End, he joined Northern Premier League Division One West side Mossley. In May 2022, he joined National League North side Curzon Ashton.

On 31 January 2025, Matthews signed for League Two club Accrington Stanley on a two-and-a-half year deal for an undisclosed fee. He made his debut the following day, coming on as a second-half substitute in a 2–1 defeat to Port Vale.

== Career statistics ==
As of 17 November 2025

Appearances and goals by club, season and competition
Club	Season	League			FA Cup		League Cup		Other		Total	
Club	Season	Division	Apps	Goals	Apps	Goals	Apps	Goals	Apps	Goals	Apps	Goals
Glossop North End	2019–20	NPL Division One South East	24	0	2	0	—		3 (Note: One appearance in FA Trophy, one appearance in Manchester Premier Cup, one appearance in Northern Premier League Challenge Cup)	0	29	0
Glossop North End	2020–21	NPL Division One South East	9	0	1	0	—		1 (Note: Appearance(s) in FA Trophy)	0	11	0
Glossop North End	Total		33	0	3	0	0	0	4	0	40	0
Mossley	2021–22	NPL Division One West	37	1	4	2	—		3 (Note: Two appearances in FA Trophy, one appearance in Manchester Premier Cup)	0	44	3
Mossley	Total		37	1	4	2	0	0	3	0	44	3
Curzon Ashton	2022–23	National League North	43	3	6	0	—		2	0	51	3
Curzon Ashton	2023–24	National League North	44	3	4	0	—		3 (Note: Two appearances in FA Trophy, one appearance in National League North play-offs)	0	47	3
Curzon Ashton	2024–25	National League North	25	2	4	0	—		1	0	30	2
Curzon Ashton	Total		112	8	14	0	0	0	6	0	132	8
Accrington Stanley	2024–25	League Two	20	0	0	0	0	0	0	0	20	0
Accrington Stanley	2025-26	League Two	15	0	1	0	3	0	2	0	21	0
Accrington Stanley	Total		35	0	1	0	3	0	2	0	41	0
Career total			217	9	22	2	3	0	15	0	257	11

== Personal life ==
Prior to becoming professional in 2025, Matthews worked in sales.
