= Benn Ward =

English footballer (born 2003)

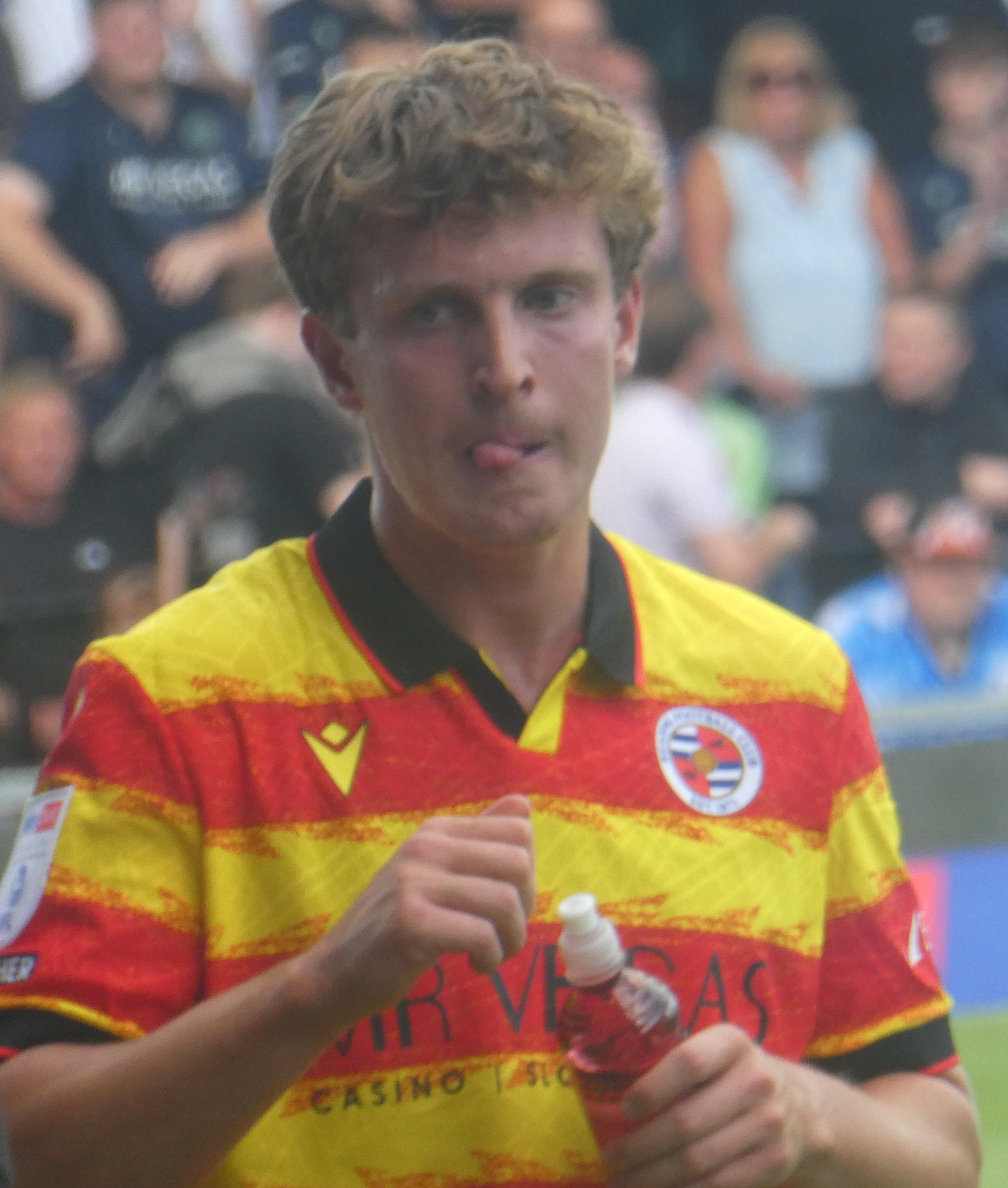
- Ward playing for Reading in 2026

Personal information
- Full name: Benn David Ward
- Date of birth: 31 October 2003 (age 23)
- Place of birth: Hastings, England
- Height: 1.88 m (6 ft 2 in)
- Position: Centre-back

Team information
- Current team: Reading
- Number: 16

Youth career
- Brighton & Hove Albion

Senior career*
Years	Team	Apps	(Gls)
2020–2021	Hastings United	5	(0)
2021–2025	Burnley	0	(0)
2023–2024	→ Swindon Town (loan)	3	(0)
2025–2026	Accrington Stanley	44	(3)
2026–	Reading	17	(1)
- * Club domestic league appearances and goals as of 13:40, 11 October 2026 (UTC)

Benn David Ward (born 31 October 2003) is an English professional footballer who plays as a centre-back for EFL League One club Reading.

== Career ==
Born in Hastings, Ward began his career with Brighton & Hove Albion before joining Hastings United aged 16. He made 10 appearances for the club, including five in the Isthmian League, before signing for Burnley in January 2021, where he signed his first professional contract in October 2022. He moved on loan to Swindon Town in August 2023. He was recalled in January 2024, having made 5 appearances for Swindon.

On 20 January 2025, Ward signed for League Two club Accrington Stanley on an eighteen-month contract for an undisclosed fee.

On 26 January 2026 Ward signed for Reading for an undisclosed fee.

== Career statistics ==
As of match played 10 October 2026

Appearances and goals by club, season and competition
Club	Season	League			FA Cup		EFL Cup		Other		Total	
Club	Season	Division	Apps	Goals	Apps	Goals	Apps	Goals	Apps	Goals	Apps	Goals
Hastings United	2020–21	IL South East Division	5	0	3	0	—		2 (Note: Appearances in the FA Trophy)	0	10	0
Burnley	2020–21	Premier League	0	0	0	0	0	0	0	0	0	0
Burnley	2021–22	Premier League	0	0	0	0	0	0	0	0	0	0
Burnley	2022–23	Championship	0	0	0	0	0	0	0	0	0	0
Burnley	2023–24	Premier League	0	0	0	0	0	0	0	0	0	0
Burnley	2024–25	Championship	0	0	0	0	0	0	0	0	0	0
Burnley	Total		0	0	0	0	0	0	0	0	0	0
Swindon Town (loan)	2023–24	League Two	3	0	0	0	1	0	1 (Note: Appearances in the EFL Trophy.)	0	5	0
Accrington Stanley	2024–25	League Two	21	1	0	0	0	0	0	0	21	1
Accrington Stanley	2025–26	League Two	23	2	2	0	1	0	1	0	27	2
Accrington Stanley	Total		44	3	2	0	1	0	1	0	48	3
Reading	2025–26	League One	8	0	0	0	0	0	0	0	8	0
Reading	2026–27	League One	9	1	0	0	2	0	0	0	11	1
Reading	Total		17	1	0	0	2	0	0	0	19	1
Career total			69	4	5	0	4	0	4	0	82	4
