= Dan Martin (footballer, born 2002) =

English professional footballer

Personal information
- Full name: Daniel James Martin
- Date of birth: 19 April 2002 (age 24)
- Place of birth: Trafford, England
- Height: 1.81 m (5 ft 11 in)
- Position: Midfielder

Youth career
- 2010–2020: Accrington Stanley

Senior career*
Years	Team	Apps	(Gls)
2020–2026	Accrington Stanley	69	(0)
2021	→ South Shields (loan)	9	(0)
2021–2022	→ Bamber Bridge (loan)	19	(0)
2026	→ Marine (loan)	5	(0)
- * Club domestic league appearances and goals as of 16:53, 3 May 2026 (UTC)

Daniel James Martin (born 19 April 2002) is an English professional footballer who plays as a midfielder for EFL League Two club Accrington Stanley. He will become a free agent on 30 June 2026.

== Career ==
Martin joined the Accrington Stanley Academy at the Under 9 level, and signed his first professional contract in September 2020. In September 2021, Martin joined Northern Premier League Premier Division club South Shields on loan, where he remained for two months before joining league rivals Bamber Bridge.

On 9 August 2022, Martin was named in the starting XI for his professional debut in the EFL Cup in a 2–2 draw at home at Crown Ground against Tranmere Rovers. On 24 September 2022, Martin made his football league debut in a League One fixture coming off the bench in the 63 minute for Seamus Conneely in a 1–0 win against Bristol Rovers.

On 14 January 2026, Martin joined National League North club Marine on a one-month loan.

He departed Accrington Stanley upon the expiry of his contract at the end of the 2025–26 season.

== Career statistics ==
As of end of 2025–26 season

Appearances and goals by club, season and competition
Club	Season	League			FA Cup		EFL Cup		Other		Total	
Club	Season	Division	Apps	Goals	Apps	Goals	Apps	Goals	Apps	Goals	Apps	Goals
Accrington Stanley	2022–23	League One	21	0	2	0	1	0	5 (Note: Appearance(s) in EFL Trophy)	0	29	0
Accrington Stanley	2023–24	League Two	32	0	2	0	1	0	5	0	40	0
Accrington Stanley	2024–25	League Two	6	0	1	0	1	0	0	0	8	0
Accrington Stanley	2025–26	League Two	10	0	0	0	1	0	3	0	14	0
Accrington Stanley	Total		69	0	5	0	4	0	13	0	91	0
South Shields (loan)	2021–22	NPL Premier Division	9	0	1	0	—		1 (Note: Appearance(s) in FA Trophy)	0	11	0
Bamber Bridge (loan)	2021–22	NPL Premier Division	19	0	0	0	—		0	0	19	0
Marine (loan)	2025–26	National League North	5	0	0	0	—		1	0	6	0
Career total			102	0	6	0	4	0	15	0	127	0
