= Isaac Heath =

English footballer

Personal information
- Full name: Isaac Theodor Lambie Heath
- Date of birth: 28 October 2004 (age 22)
- Place of birth: Leeds, England
- Position: Winger

Team information
- Current team: Cambridge United
- Number: 7

Youth career
- Leeds United
- 2017–2025: Everton

Senior career*
Years	Team	Apps	(Gls)
2025–2026	Everton	0	(0)
2025–2026	→ Accrington Stanley (loan)	30	(4)
2026–	Cambridge United	10	(1)
- * Club domestic league appearances and goals as of 08:31, 7 November 2026 (UTC)

Isaac Theodor Lambie Heath (born 28 October 2004) is an English professional footballer who plays as a forward for club Cambridge United.

== Career ==
=== Everton ===
On 10 July 2025, Heath signed a new two-year contract with Everton until the end of June 2027.

==== Accrington Stanley (loan) ====
On 1 September 2025, Heath signed on loan for EFL League Two club Accrington Stanley until the end of the 2025–26 season

On 2 September 2025, Heath made his debut for Accrington Stanley in the EFL Trophy away to Fleetwood Town – Heath scored 3 minutes into the match, also claiming an assist several minutes later, in a 2–2 draw. Furthermore, he scored his penalty in the shootout, which Accrington went on to lose 5–4.

On 18 October 2025, Heath scored his first senior league goal in a 4-0 victory over Swindon Town, also assisting one goal.

On 26 April 2026, Heath won three awards at the Accrington Stanley end of season awards evening, including Young Player of the Season, Players' Young Player of the Season and Manager's Young Player of the Season.

=== Cambridge United ===
On 15 June 2026, Heath signed for newly promoted League One club Cambridge United on a permanent three-year deal.

== Career statistics ==
As of match played 6 November 2026

Appearances and goals by club, season and competition
Club	Season	League			FA Cup		EFL Cup		Other		Total	
Club	Season	Division	Apps	Goals	Apps	Goals	Apps	Goals	Apps	Goals	Apps	Goals
Everton	2025–26	Premier League	0	0	0	0	0	0	0	0	0	0
Accrington Stanley (loan)	2025–26	League Two	30	4	2	1	0	0	1 (Note: Appearance(s) in EFL Trophy)	1	33	6
Cambridge United	2026–27	League One	10	1	1	0	2	1	3	2	16	4
Career total			40	5	3	1	2	1	4	3	49	10
