= Anjola Popoola =

English association football player (born 2007)

Personal information
- Full name: Anjolaoluwa David Popoola
- Date of birth: 19 June 2007 (age 19)
- Place of birth: Lagos, Nigeria
- Height: 1.85 m (6 ft 1 in)
- Position: Forward

Team information
- Current team: Chorley (on loan from Accrington Stanley)
- Number: 19

Youth career
- 2023–2025: Accrington Stanley

Senior career*
| Years | Team | Apps | (Gls) |
| 2023– | Accrington Stanley | 11 | (0) |
| 2025 | → Clitheroe (loan) | 4 | (0) |
| 2025 | → Marine (loan) | 6 | (0) |
| 2025–2026 | → Chorley (loan) | 10 | (5) |
| 2026 | → Macclesfield (loan) | 9 | (0) |
| 2026– | → Chorley (loan) | 11 | (0) |
- * Club domestic league appearances and goals as of 14:16, 2 November 2026 (UTC)

Anjolaoluwa David Popoola (born 19 June 2007) is a Nigerian professional footballer who plays as a forward for National League North side Chorley, on loan from EFL League Two club Accrington Stanley.

== Early life ==
Popoola was born in Lagos, Nigeria.

== Career ==
On 24 July 2023, EFL League Two side Accrington Stanley announced Popoola as one of nine youngsters to have signed a scholarship deal with the club.

On 10 October 2023, Popoola became the youngest player in the 21st century for Accrington after coming off the bench in the EFL Trophy for the 6 minutes of added time against Harrogate Town in a 5–3 win.

On 24 February 2024, Popoola made his EFL League Two debut, coming off the bench in the 80th minute against Crawley Town in a 1–0 loss. He made his second appearance three days later, on 27 February, coming off the bench in the 73rd minute against Walsall in a 2–1 loss. In June 2024, he signed a first professional contract.

On 31 January 2025, Popoola joined Northern Premier League Division One West side Clitheroe on an initial twenty-eight day loan.

He joined National League North team Marine on 24 October 2025, on a one-month loan. A day later, he came off the bench to make his debut, providing a stoppage time assist for the games winning goal in a 2–1 win away to Scarborough Athletic.

On 5 December 2025, Popoola joined National League North team Chorley. On 20 December 2025, he scored his first goal for Chorley in a 4–2 home victory over Hereford.

He was recalled in February 2026, before joining Macclesfield on loan for the remainder of the season the following month.

On 4 May 2026, Popoola had the 1-year contract extension activated by Accrington Stanley, extending his contract until the summer of 2027

On 4 July 2026, Popoola joined Chorley on a long-term loan

== Career statistics ==
As of updated 2 November 2026

Appearances and goals by club, season and competition
| Club | Season | League | | | FA Cup | | League Cup | | Other | | Total | |
| Club | Season | Division | Apps | Goals | Apps | Goals | Apps | Goals | Apps | Goals | Apps | Goals |
|---|---|---|---|---|---|---|---|---|---|---|---|---|
| Accrington Stanley | 2023–24 | EFL League Two | 2 | 0 | 0 | 0 | 0 | 0 | 1 | 0 | 3 | 0 |
| Accrington Stanley | 2024–25 | EFL League Two | 2 | 0 | 1 | 0 | 0 | 0 | 2 | 1 | 5 | 1 |
| Accrington Stanley | 2025–26 | EFL League Two | 7 | 0 | 0 | 0 | 3 | 1 | 2 | 0 | 11 | 1 |
| Accrington Stanley | Total | | 11 | 0 | 1 | 0 | 3 | 1 | 5 | 1 | 20 | 2 |
| Clitheroe (loan) | 2024–25 | Northern Premier League | 4 | 0 | 0 | 0 | – | – | 0 | 0 | 4 | 0 |
| Clitheroe (loan) | Total | | 4 | 0 | 0 | 0 | - | - | 0 | 0 | 4 | 0 |
| Marine (loan) | 2025–26 | National League North | 6 | 0 | 0 | 0 | – | – | 1 | 1 | 7 | 1 |
| Marine (loan) | Total | | 6 | 0 | 0 | 0 | - | - | 1 | 1 | 7 | 1 |
| Chorley (loan) | 2025–26 | National League North | 10 | 5 | 0 | 0 | – | – | 0 | 0 | 10 | 5 |
| Chorley (loan) | Total | | 10 | 5 | 0 | 0 | - | - | 0 | 0 | 10 | 5 |
| Macclesfield (loan) | 2025–26 | National League North | 9 | 0 | 0 | 0 | – | – | 1* | 0 | 10 | 0 |
| Macclesfield (loan) | Total | | 9 | 0 | 0 | 0 | - | - | 1 | 0 | 10 | 0 |
| Chorley (loan) | 2026–27 | National League North | 11 | 0 | 0 | 0 | – | – | 0 | 0 | 11 | 0 |
| Chorley (loan) | Total | | 11 | 0 | 0 | 0 | - | - | 0 | 0 | 11 | 0 |
| Career total | | | 51 | 5 | 1 | 0 | 3 | 1 | 7 | 2 | 62 | 8 |
