= Joe Bauress =

English footballer (born 2005)

Personal information
- Full name: Joseph Michael Bauress
- Date of birth: 24 November 2005 (age 20)
- Place of birth: Liverpool, England
- Height: 1.76 m (5 ft 9 in)
- Position: Central midfielder

Team information
- Current team: Burnley

Youth career
- 2014–2022: Burnley

Senior career*
Years	Team	Apps	(Gls)
2022–	Burnley	0	(0)
2025–2026	→ Accrington Stanley (loan)	17	(0)

International career^{‡}
2020	England U15	1	(0)
2023	England U18	3	(0)
- * Club domestic league appearances and goals as of 10:39, 30 December 2025 (UTC) ‡ National team caps and goals as of 20:56, 23 June 2023 (UTC)

Joseph Michael Bauress (born 24 November 2005) is an English professional footballer who plays as a central midfielder for Premier League club Burnley.

== Club career ==
Born in Liverpool, Bauress is a product of the Burnley youth academy. On 8 July 2022, he was promoted to the Burnley under-18s for the 2022–23 season, signing a scholarship contract.

Bauress made his professional debut as a late substitute with Burnley in a 3–1 EFL Cup win over Crawley Town on 8 November 2022.

On 5 August 2025, Bauress joined EFL League Two club Accrington Stanley on a season-long loan.

== International career ==
Bauress was first called up to a training camp for the England U15s in February 2020. He made an appearance with the England U15s against Belgium in November 2020.

In June 2023 Bauress represented England U18.

== Personal life ==
Bauress is the son of the retired footballer Gary Bauress.

== Career statistics ==
As of match played 19 December 2025

Appearances and goals by club, season and competition
Club	Season	League			FA Cup		League Cup		Other		Total	
Club	Season	Division	Apps	Goals	Apps	Goals	Apps	Goals	Apps	Goals	Apps	Goals
Burnley	2022–23	Championship	0	0	0	0	1	0	—		1	0
Burnley	2023–24	Premier League	0	0	0	0	0	0	—		0	0
Burnley	2024–25	Championship	0	0	2	0	0	0	—		2	0
Burnley	Total		0	0	0	0	0	0	—		3	0
Accrington Stanley (loan)	2025–26	League Two	17	0	2	0	1	0	1 (Note: Appearance(s) in EFL Trophy)	1	21	1
Career total			17	0	4	0	2	0	1	1	24	1
