= Alex Henderson (footballer, born 2004) =

English footballer

Personal information
- Full name: Alex William Henderson
- Date of birth: 25 September 2004 (age 22)
- Place of birth: Blackburn, England
- Height: 1.82 m (6 ft 0 in)
- Position: Midfielder

Team information
- Current team: Accrington Stanley
- Number: 10

Youth career
- 2019–2023: Accrington Stanley

Senior career*
Years	Team	Apps	(Gls)
2023–	Accrington Stanley	83	(9)
2023	→ Colne (loan)	4	(0)
2023	→ Clitheroe (loan)	9	(0)
- * Club domestic league appearances and goals as of 1:59 13 March 2026 (UTC)

Alex William Henderson (born 25 September 2004) is an English footballer who plays as a midfielder for EFL League Two club Accrington Stanley.

== Career ==
Having impressed for Accrington Stanley in their youth academy, Henderson joined Northern Premier League West Division club Colne on a work-experience loan in January 2023. At the end of the 2022–23 season, he signed a first professional contract.

Having spent time on loan with Clitheroe in the early stages of the 2023–24 season, Henderson made his senior debut in October 2023 in an EFL Trophy victory over Harrogate Town. On 16 December 2023, he made his league debut as a first-half substitute in a dramatic 3–3 draw with Crewe Alexandra.

== Career statistics ==
As of 21 February 2026

Appearances and goals by club, season and competition
Club	Season	League			FA Cup		League Cup		Other		Total	
Club	Season	Division	Apps	Goals	Apps	Goals	Apps	Goals	Apps	Goals	Apps	Goals
Accrington Stanley	2022–23	League One	0	0	0	0	0	0	0	0	0	0
Accrington Stanley	2023–24	League Two	20	4	0	0	0	0	4 (Note: Appearance(s) in EFL Trophy)	1	24	5
Accrington Stanley	2024-25	League Two	28	1	2	0	1	0	2	0	33	1
Accrington Stanley	2025-26	League Two	25	3	0	0	2	1	3	1	30	5
Accrington Stanley	Total		73	8	2	0	3	1	9	2	87	11
Colne (loan)	2022–23	NPL West Division	4	0	—		—		0	0	4	0
Clitheroe (loan)	2023–24	NPL West Division	9	0	1	0	—		2 (Note: Appearance(s) in FA Trophy)	0	12	0
Career total			86	8	3	0	3	1	11	2	103	11
