= Charlie Caton =

Welsh footballer

Personal information
- Full name: Charlie George Caton
- Date of birth: 25 November 2002 (age 23)
- Place of birth: Bodelwyddan, Wales
- Position: Forward

Team information
- Current team: Accrington Stanley
- Number: 18

Youth career
- 2010–2019: Wrexham
- 2019–2020: Shrewsbury Town

Senior career*
Years	Team	Apps	(Gls)
2020–2023	Shrewsbury Town	4	(0)
2022–2023	→ Chester (loan)	26	(7)
2023–2025	Chester	53	(19)
2025–	Accrington Stanley	35	(5)
2026	→ Hartlepool United (loan)	14	(3)
- * Club domestic league appearances and goals as of 23:35, 23 August 2026 (UTC)

Charlie George Caton (born 25 November 2002) is a Welsh footballer who plays as a forward for EFL League Two club Accrington Stanley.

== Early life ==
He is the son of longstanding Bala Town manager Colin Caton.

Caton attended Ysgol Brynhyfryd in Ruthin, Denbighshire.

== Career ==
In December 2018 Caton was called up for the Welsh Schools FA under-18 training camp in Cardiff. At the time he played for Wrexham under-16s, as well as Llangynhafal in the local Llandyrnog & District Summer League. In February 2019 he scored for the Wales schoolboys team in a match against Greece.

=== Shrewsbury Town ===
Having started his career with the Wrexham academy, Caton joined Shrewsbury Town as a first-year scholar in 2019. On 10 November 2020, Caton made his first-team debut from the bench in a 4–3 EFL Trophy victory over Crewe Alexandra. Having made a total of five appearances over the course of the 2020–21 season, including three in League One, he signed a new two-year contract in June 2021.

In November 2022, Caton joined National League North club Chester on an initial one-month loan deal. Following an impressive start to his spell, the deal was first extended by a further month, then subsequently extended until the end of the season.

Following the conclusion of the 2022–23 season, it was confirmed Caton would depart the club upon the expiration of his contract.

=== Chester ===
On 27 May 2023, Caton returned to Chester on a permanent two-year deal following his successful loan spell the previous season.

Following a strong start to the 2024–25 season, Caton was named National League North Player of the Month for August 2024.

=== Accrington Stanley ===
On 16 January 2025, Caton signed for League Two club Accrington Stanley on a two-and-a-half year deal for an undisclosed fee. He signed on loan for National League side Hartlepool United on 11 February 2026 and, on the same day, scored on his debut in a 3–2 defeat against York City.

== Career statistics ==
=== Club ===
As of match played 25 April 2026

Appearances and goals by club, season and competition
Club	Season	League			FA Cup		League Cup		Other		Total	
Club	Season	Division	Apps	Goals	Apps	Goals	Apps	Goals	Apps	Goals	Apps	Goals
Shrewsbury Town	2019–20	League One	0	0	0	0	0	0	0	0	0	0
Shrewsbury Town	2020–21	League One	3	0	0	0	0	0	2 (Note: Appearance(s) in EFL Trophy)	0	5	0
Shrewsbury Town	2021–22	League One	0	0	3	0	0	0	3	0	6	0
Shrewsbury Town	2022–23	League One	1	0	0	0	2	0	3	0	6	0
Shrewsbury Town	Total		4	0	3	0	2	0	8	0	17	0
Chester (loan)	2022–23	National League North	26	7	0	0	—		3 (Note: Two appearances in FA Trophy, one appearance in National League North play-offs)	0	29	7
Chester	2023–24	National League North	28	5	5	3	—		1 (Note: Appearance(s) in FA Trophy)	0	34	8
Chester	2024–25	National League North	25	14	4	0	—		1	0	30	14
Chester	Total		79	26	9	3	—		5	0	93	29
Accrington Stanley	2024–25	League Two	12	0	—		—		—		12	0
Accrington Stanley	2025–26	League Two	21	3	2	1	2	0	3	0	28	4
Accrington Stanley	Total		33	3	2	1	2	0	3	0	40	4
Hartlepool United (loan)	2025–26	National League	14	3	—		—		—		14	3
Career total			130	32	14	4	4	0	16	0	164	36

== Honours ==
Individual

- National League North Player of the Month: August 2024
