= Isaac Sinclair (footballer) =

English footballer (born 2001)

Personal information
- Full name: Isaac Sinclair
- Date of birth: 26 July 2001 (age 25)
- Place of birth: London, England
- Height: 1.78 m (5 ft 10 in)
- Position: Midfielder

Team information
- Current team: Accrington Stanley
- Number: 11

Youth career
- Blackpool

Senior career*
Years	Team	Apps	(Gls)
- Squires Gate
- AFC Blackpool
- Longridge Town
2019–2020	Curzon Ashton	28	(2)
2020–2023	Bamber Bridge	77	(14)
2023–2025	Curzon Ashton	85	(13)
2025–	Accrington Stanley	38	(5)
- * Club domestic league appearances and goals as of 08:57, 3 May 2026 (UTC)

Isaac Sinclair (born 26 July 2001) is an English professional footballer who plays as a midfielder for Accrington Stanley.

== Club career ==
Born in London, Sinclair lived in Dubai as a child before moving to North West England. After playing in the Blackpool academy, he spent time in non-league with Squires Gate, AFC Blackpool and Longridge Town.

Sinclair later played for Curzon Ashton, combining his football career with jobs designing clothes and sportswear and working for his brother's scaffolding company. He also played for Bamber Bridge.

He signed for Accrington Stanley in June 2025, describing the move as a "massive deal". He scored his first professional goal on 13 September 2025, in a 1–0 victory against Colchester United.

== International career ==
In January 2019, Sinclair was selected to play for the England Schools' under-18 team.

== Personal life ==
Sinclair is the son of former footballer Trevor Sinclair.
