= 2025–26 Chesterfield F.C. season =

159th season in existence of Chesterfield FC

Chesterfield
2025–26 season
- Owner: Phil and Ashley Kirk
- Chairman: Mike Goodwin
- Manager: Paul Cook
- Stadium: SMH Group Stadium
- League Two: 6th
- FA Cup: Second round
- EFL Cup: First round
- EFL Trophy: Round of 32
- Top goalscorer: League: Lee Bonis (12); All: Lee Bonis (16)

The 2025–26 season is the 159th season in the history of Chesterfield Football Club and their second consecutive season in League Two. The club are participating in League Two, the FA Cup, the EFL Cup and the EFL Trophy.

== Transfers and contracts ==
=== In ===
Date	Pos.	Player	From	Fee	Ref.
20 June 2025	GK	(England) Zach Hemming	(England) Middlesbrough	£150,000	
30 June 2025	CF	(Northern Ireland) Lee Bonis	(Netherlands) ADO Den Haag	Undisclosed	
1 July 2025 (Note: The transfer was announced on 18 June, and would become official on July 1 once his contract at Morecambe had expired)	LB	(England) Adam Lewis	(England) Morecambe	Free	
1 July 2025 (Note: The transfer was announced on 17 June, and would become official on July 1 once his contract at Blackburn had expired)	RW	(England) Dilan Markanday	(England) Blackburn Rovers	Free	
1 July 2025 (Note: The transfer was announced on 18 June, and would become official on July 1 once his contract at Walsall had expired)	CDM	(Wales) Ryan Stirk	(England) Walsall	Free	
18 July 2025	CDM	(Scotland) Luke Butterfield	(England) Everton	Free	
1 January 2026	CF	(England) Freddie Ladapo	(England) Huddersfield Town	Free	
1 January 2026 (Note: The transfer was announced on 7 August, and would become official on January 1 once his contract at Forge had expired)	CB	(England) Malik Owolabi-Belewu	(Canada) Forge	Free	
9 January 2026	LB	(England) Tom Pearce	(Canada) Montréal	Free	
16 January 2026	CF	(England) Will Dickson	(England) Manchester City	Undisclosed	

Expenditure: ▼£150,000

=== Out ===
Date	Pos.	Player	To	Fee	Ref.
13 November 2025	RB	(England) Ryheem Sheckleford	(England) Aldershot Town	Free Transfer	

=== Loaned in ===
Date	Pos.	Player	From	Date until	Ref.
3 July 2025	CM	(New Zealand) Matt Dibley-Dias	(England) Fulham	7 January 2026 (Note: On 7 January, Dibley-Dias and Tanton were recalled from their season-long loans from Fulham)	
8 July 2025	RB	(Colombia) Devan Tanton	(England) Fulham	7 January 2026	
5 August 2025	CAM	(England) Ronan Darcy	(England) Wigan Athletic	16 January 2026 (Note: On 16 January, Darcy's initial season-long loan from Wigan Athletic was terminated)	
8 August 2025	LW	(England) James Berry	(England) Wycombe Wanderers	31 May 2026	
1 September 2025	CF	(England) Will Dickson	(England) Manchester City	5 January 2026	
4 January 2026	CDM	(England) Sammy Braybrooke	(England) Leicester City	31 May 2026	
4 January 2026	RB	(Republic of Ireland) Sam Curtis	(England) Sheffield United	31 May 2026	
4 January 2026	CB	(Netherlands) Sil Swinkels	(England) Aston Villa	31 May 2026	

=== Loaned out ===
Date	Pos.	Player	To	Date until	Ref.
15 August 2025	CAM	(England) Bailey Hobson	(England) Brackley Town	14 January 2026	
21 August 2025	CF	(Republic of Ireland) Paddy Madden	(England) Accrington Stanley	31 May 2026	
3 September 2025	LW	(Gibraltar) Liam Jessop	(Gibraltar) Lincoln Red Imps	31 May 2026	
19 November 2025	CF	(Malta) Gunner Elliott	(England) Matlock Town	20 December 2025	
20 November 2025	GK	(Australia) Ashton Rinaldo	(England) Matlock Town	20 December 2025	
22 January 2026	CDM	(Scotland) Luke Butterfield	(England) Accrington Stanley	31 May 2026	
30 January 2026	CB	(England) Alex Whitney	(England) Stocksbridge Park Steels	28 February 2026	
5 February 2026	CB	(England) Jamie Grimes	(England) Boston United	31 May 2026	
10 March 2026	LB	(England) Adam Lewis	(England) AFC Fylde	31 May 2026	

=== Released / Out of Contract ===
Date	Pos.	Player	Subsequent club	Join date	Ref.
30 June 2025	CM	(England) Ollie Banks	(England) York City	1 July 2025	
30 June 2025	CB	(England) Ash Palmer	(England) York City	1 July 2025	
30 June 2025	CF	(England) Kane Drummond	(England) Oldham Athletic	1 July 2025	
30 June 2025	LW	(England) Michael Jacobs	(England) Northampton Town	1 July 2025	
30 June 2025	CM	(England) Darren Oldaker	(England) Swindon Town	1 July 2025	
30 June 2025	CM	(England) Mike Jones	Retired		
30 June 2025	CM	(England) Ali Mohiuddin	(England) Mickleover	12 August 2025	
4 August 2025	RW	(England) Ryan Colclough	(England) Fylde	9 September 2025	
12 March 2026	CB	(England) Tyrone Williams	Retired		

=== New Contract ===
Date	Pos.	Player	Contracted until	Ref.
19 June 2025	GK	(England) Ryan Boot	30 June 2026	
19 June 2025	CM	(Scotland) John Fleck	30 June 2026	
19 June 2025	CB	(England) Kyle McFadzean	30 June 2026	
18 July 2025	CF	(Malta) Gunner Elliott	Undisclosed (Note: First professional contract)	
24 July 2025	LB	(Scotland) Lewis Gordon	30 June 2027	
25 September 2025	RB	(Saint Lucia) Janoi Donacien	30 June 2026	
1 October 2025	CF	(Northern Ireland) Will Grigg	30 June 2027	
13 February 2026	CAM	(England) Liam Mandeville	30 June 2028	
25 February 2026	CDM	(England) Tom Naylor	30 June 2028	

== Pre-season and friendlies ==
On 23 May, Chesterfield announced their first pre-season fixture, against Matlock Town. Three weeks later, a second friendly was added against Sheffield United. Also confirmed was a training camp in Spain, along with a friendly against Europa Point. On 17 June, a fourth friendly match was added to the schedule, against Burton Albion. A fifth and sixth friendly was later announced, against Nottingham Forest and Alfreton Town.

Win Draw Loss Fixtures

5 July 2025 Friendly	Matlock Town	2–1	Chesterfield	Matlock
15:00 BST	Trialist 58'; Trialist 81'	Report	Grigg 52'	Stadium: Causeway Lane; Attendance: 2,300

8 July 2025 Friendly	Chesterfield	5–0	Burton Albion	Chesterfield
19:00 BST	Grigg 32' (pen.), 35'; Colclough 45'; Bonis 59'; Lewis 64'	Report		Stadium: SMH Group Stadium

12 July 2025 Friendly	Chesterfield	0–0	Nottingham Forest	Tapton
14:00 BST		Report		Stadium: SMH Group Stadium; Attendance: 6,208 (2,994 away)

15 July 2025 Friendly	Europa Point	3–8	Chesterfield	La Cala de Mijas, Spain
18:00 CEST		Report	Markanday 3'; Grimes 30'; Hobson 34'; Naylor 52'; Bonis 56', 60'; Duffy 86'; Grigg 90' (pen.)	Stadium: La Cala Training Ground

19 July 2025 Friendly	Alfreton Town	1–1	Chesterfield	Alfreton
15:00 BST	Fewster 78'	Report	Dunkley 22'	Stadium: North Street

26 July 2025 Friendly	Chesterfield	1–4	Sheffield United	Tapton
15:00 BST	Bonis 37'	Report	Cáceres 4'; Ukaki 13'; Ahmedhodžić 33'; Cannon 52'	Stadium: SMH Group Stadium

== Competitions ==
=== League Two ===
==== League table ====
Pos	Team	Pld	W	D	L	GF	GA	GD	Pts	Promotion, qualification or relegation
4	Salford City	46	25	6	15	61	51	+10	81	Qualification for League Two play-offs
5	Notts County (O, P)	46	24	8	14	74	52	+22	80	Qualification for League Two play-offs
6	Chesterfield	46	21	16	9	71	56	+15	79	Qualification for League Two play-offs
7	Grimsby Town	46	22	12	12	74	50	+24	78	Qualification for League Two play-offs
8	Barnet	46	21	13	12	70	53	+17	76	

Source: EFL Official Website
Rules for classification: 1) Points; 2) Goal difference; 3) Number of goals scored; 4) Head-to-head results; 5) Wins; 6) Away goals; 7) Penalty points (sec 9.5); 8) 12-point sending off offences
(O) Play-off winners; (P) Promoted

==== Results summary ====
Overall								Home						Away					
Pld	W	D	L	GF	GA	GD	Pts	W	D	L	GF	GA	GD	W	D	L	GF	GA	GD
46	21	16	9	71	56	+15	79	11	8	4	38	24	+14	10	8	5	33	32	+1

Last updated: complete.
Source: Soccerway

==== Results by round ====
Round	1	2	3	4	5	6	7	8	9	10	11	12	13	14	15	16	17	18	19	20	21	22	23	24	25	27	28	29	30	31	32	33	34	35	26^{1}	36	37	38	39	41	42	43	40^{2}	44	45	46
Ground	H	A	H	A	A	H	A	H	A	H	A	H	H	A	H	A	A	H	A	H	A	H	H	A	A	H	A	A	H	A	H	H	A	A	H	H	A	H	A	H	A	H	H	A	H	A
Result	W	W	W	L	W	D	L	D	D	W	L	W	D	D	D	W	D	L	D	W	W	W	L	D	D	D	L	W	D	W	D	W	D	L	W	L	W	L	W	W	W	D	W	D	W	W
Position	7	3	2	3	2	2	7	6	5	6	9	6	6	7	10	6	6	9	9	7	7	7	7	8	7	8	9	8	8	8	8	6	7	8	6	8	7	8	8	7	7	7	7	7	7	6
Points	3	6	9	9	12	13	13	14	15	18	18	21	22	23	24	27	28	28	29	32	35	38	38	39	40	41	41	44	45	48	49	52	53	53	56	56	59	59	62	65	66	67	70	71	74	77

Source: EFL
A = Away; H = Home; W = Win; D = Draw; L = Loss; P = Postponed
Notes:
- ^{1} Matchday 26 (vs. Colchester United) was postponed due to a frozen pitch.
- ^{2} Matchday 40 (vs. Grimsby Town) was postponed due to international call-ups.

==== Matches ====
On 26 June, the League Two fixtures were released, with Chesterfied hosting Barrow on the opening weekend.

Win Draw Loss Fixtures

2 August 2025 1	Chesterfield	1–0	Barrow	Chesterfield
15:00 BST	Markanday 45'; Naylor (yellow card) 66'	Report	Smith (yellow card) 17'	Stadium: SMH Group Stadium; Attendance: 8,223 (413 Away); Referee: Alan Young

9 August 2025 2	Cheltenham Town	0–2	Chesterfield	Cheltenham
15:00 BST	Broom (yellow card) 22'; Angol (yellow card) 25'; Bennett (yellow card) 37'; Archer (yellow card) 41'; Bickerstaff (yellow card) 62'; Jude-Boyd (yellow card) 67'; Mažionis (yellow card) 80'	Report	Gordon 47'; Bonis (yellow card) 52'; Duffy 68'	Stadium: Whaddon Road; Attendance: 4,002; Referee: Benjamin Speedie

16 August 2025 3	Chesterfield	3–1	Bristol Rovers	Chesterfield
12:30 BST	McFadzean (yellow card) 15', (goal) 84'; Naylor 41', (yellow card) 51'; Daley-Campbell (yellow card) 58'; Dobra 88'	Report	Senior (red card) 39'; Sparkes (yellow card) 57'; Hutchinson 68'; Mola (yellow card) 72'; Sotiriou (yellow card) 80'	Stadium: SMH Group Stadium; Attendance: 8,013; Referee: Sam Mulhall
Note: Fixture was originally scheduled for a 15:00 kick-off, but was moved for live Sky Sports broadcasting.

19 August 2025 4	Gillingham	4–1	Chesterfield	Gillingham
19:45 BST	Little 28' (pen.), 50' (pen.); Andrews (yellow card) 37'; Cirino (yellow card) 45+1', (goal) 56'; Coleman (yellow card) 71'; Nevitt (yellow card) 73'; Wyllie 90+1'	Report	Dobra 53'; Daley-Campbell (yellow card) 63'	Stadium: Priestfield Stadium; Attendance: 5,518; Referee: Craig Hicks

23 August 2025 5	Harrogate Town	1–2	Chesterfield	Harrogate
15:00 BST	Duke-McKenna 50'	Report	Darcy 6'; Dibley-Dias (yellow card) 39'; Dunkley 81'	Stadium: Wetherby Road; Attendance: 3,276 (inc. 1,050 Chesterfield fans); Referee: Steven Copeland

30 August 2025 6	Chesterfield	2–2	Crawley Town	Chesterfield
15:00 BST	Darcy (yellow card) 20'; Gordon (yellow card) 51'; Dobra (yellow card) 54', (goal) 58'; Duffy 56'; Lewis (yellow card) 90+4'	Report	Barker (yellow card) 8'; McKirdy 9', 36', (yellow card) 36'; Bajrami (yellow card) 45'; Scott (yellow card) 49'	Stadium: SMH Group Stadium; Attendance: 8,005; Referee: Ben Toner

6 September 2025 7	Walsall	1–0	Chesterfield	Bescot
15:00 BST	Warrington (yellow card) 39'; Kanu 43'; Lakin (yellow card) 45' (yellow-red card) 66'; Barrett (yellow card) 61'	Report	Dobra (yellow card) 18'; Naylor (yellow card) 45+1'; Daley-Campbell (yellow card) 72'; Dunkley (yellow card) 86'	Stadium: Bescot Stadium; Attendance: 6,695; Referee: Zac Kennard-Kettle

13 September 2025 8	Chesterfield	1–1	Milton Keynes Dons	Chesterfield
15:00 BST	Dobra (yellow card) 65'; Naylor 86'	Report	Hepburn-Murphy 25', (yellow card) 65'; Crowley (yellow card) 35'; Mendez-Laing (yellow card) 56'; Gilbey (yellow card) 68'	Stadium: SMH Group Stadium; Attendance: 8,127 (592 away); Referee: Edward Duckworth

20 September 2025 9	Bromley	2–2	Chesterfield	Bromley
15:00 BST	Cheek 16'; Krauhaus (yellow card) 53'; Dunkley 79' (o.g.); Odutayo (yellow card) 90'	Report	Daley-Campbell (yellow card) 22'; Naylor (yellow card) 33'; Dobra 39'; Mandeville 67'; Darcy (yellow card) 69'	Stadium: Hayes Lane; Attendance: 2,583; Referee: Carl Brook

27 September 2025 10	Chesterfield	4–1	Newport County	Chesterfield
15:00 BST	Mandeville (yellow card) 31'; Grigg 34'; Dickson 43'; Stirk (yellow card) 45+3'; Fleck (yellow card) 77'; Darcy 84'; Markanday 88'	Report	Ogunneye (yellow card) 65'; Spellman 80', (yellow card) 83'	Stadium: SMH Group Stadium; Attendance: 7,726; Referee: Stephen Parkinson

4 October 2025 11	Colchester United	6–2	Chesterfield	Colchester
15:00 BST	Anderson 5', 90+6'; Payne 13', 44', 45+5' (pen.); Vincent-Young (yellow card) 22'; Lisbie 68'	Report	Mandeville 20'; Dobra (yellow card) 45+1'; Berry 81'	Stadium: Colchester Community Stadium; Attendance: 4,879; Referee: Lee Swabey

11 October 2025 12	Chesterfield	2–0	Salford City	Chesterfield
15:00 BST	Naylor (yellow card) 3'; Turton 62' (o.g.); Darcy 83'; Daley-Campbell (yellow card) 90+2'; McFadzean (yellow card) 90+2'	Report	Turton (yellow card) 29'; Woodburn (yellow card) 82'	Stadium: SMH Group Stadium; Attendance: 7,962; Referee: Oliver Mackey

18 October 2025 13	Chesterfield	1–1	Fleetwood Town	Chesterfield
15:00 BST	Markanday 25'; Tanton (yellow card) 39'	Report	Davies 7'; Virtue (yellow card) 68'; Neal (yellow card) 81'; Bonds (yellow card) 90+4'	Stadium: SMH Group Stadium; Attendance: 7,641; Referee: Dean Whitestone

25 October 2025 14	Tranmere Rovers	1–1	Chesterfield	Birkenhead
15:00 BST	Jennings 90+3'	Report	Patrick 12' (o.g.); Stirk (yellow card) 26'; Dunkley (yellow card) 40'	Stadium: Prenton Park; Attendance: 7,013 (1,067 Chesterfield fans); Referee: Scott Oldham

8 November 2025 15	Chesterfield	3–3	Accrington Stanley	Chesterfield
15:00 GMT	Fleck (yellow card) 23'; Berry (yellow card) 37', (goal) 62'; Naylor 45+4'; Bonis 47', (penalty missed) 90+4'; McFadzean (yellow card) 55'	Report	Walton 17', 26'; Whalley (yellow card) 24'; Matthews (yellow card) 33'; Caton 75'; Bauress 88'; Love (yellow card) 90+1'; Conneely (yellow card) 90+3'	Stadium: SMH Group Stadium; Attendance: 7,822; Referee: Thomas Parsons

15 November 2025 16	Grimsby Town	0–1	Chesterfield	Cleethorpes
15:00 GMT	Warren (yellow card) 29'; Pym (red card) 53'; Kabia (yellow card) 56'	Report	Dunkley (yellow card) 32'; Rodgers 71' (o.g.); Darcy (yellow card) 79'; Bonis (yellow card) 90+5'	Stadium: Blundell Park; Attendance: 7,407 (1,184 away); Referee: Martin Woods

22 November 2025 17	Crewe Alexandra	3–3	Chesterfield	Crewe
15:00 GMT	Tezgel 35' (pen.); Golding (yellow card) 40'; Sanders (yellow card) 45+2'; Connolly (yellow card) 45+4', (goal) 69'; Agius 47'	Report	Berry 9'; Bonis 24'; Dunkley (yellow card) 34'; McFadzean (yellow card) 35'; Markanday 65'; Tanton (yellow card) 68'; Fleck (yellow card) 79'; Hemming (yellow card) 80'	Stadium: Gresty Road; Attendance: 5,770; Referee: David Rock

29 November 2025 18	Chesterfield	1–2	Swindon Town	Chesterfield
15:00 GMT	Fleck 10'; Tanton (yellow card) 39'	Report	Munroe 8', (yellow card) 69' (yellow-red card) 90+1'; Snowdon 61'; Drinan (yellow card) 63'; Glatzel (yellow card) 75'; Ripley (yellow card) 84'	Stadium: SMH Group Stadium; Attendance: 8,258; Referee: Jacob Miles

9 December 2025 19	Cambridge United	1–1	Chesterfield	Cambridge
19:45 GMT	Watts 13'	Report	McFadzean 90+3'	Stadium: Abbey Stadium; Attendance: 5,192 (450 Chesterfield supporters); Referee: Elliot Swallow

13 December 2025 20	Chesterfield	3–1	Barnet	Chesterfield
15:00 GMT	Bonis 11', 38'; Dunkley (yellow card) 65'; Gordon (yellow card) 79'; Stirk (yellow card) 80'; Mandeville 80'	Report	Shelton 41'	Stadium: SMH Group Stadium; Attendance: 7,533; Referee: Peter Wright

20 December 2025 21	Shrewsbury Town	0–1	Chesterfield	Shrewsbury
15:00 GMT		Report	Bonis 61', (yellow card) 75'; McFadzean (yellow card) 67'; Naylor (yellow card) 82'	Stadium: New Meadow; Attendance: 5,890 (991 away); Referee: Paul Howard

26 December 2025 22	Chesterfield	2–0	Notts County	Chesterfield
15:00 GMT	McFadzean (yellow card) 15'; Naylor (yellow card) 19'; Grimes (yellow card) 36'; Bonis 65'; Roos 76' (o.g.)	Report	Dennis (yellow card) 48'; Tsaroulla (yellow card) 68'; Macari (yellow card) 87'	Stadium: SMH Group Stadium; Attendance: 10,059; Referee: Benjamin Speedie

29 December 2025 23	Chesterfield	0–1	Cambridge United	Chesterfield
19:45 GMT	Hemming (yellow card) 76'	Report	Hoddle (yellow card) 16'; McLoughlin 44'; Lavery (yellow card) 72'; Gibbons (yellow card) 76'; Eastwood (yellow card) 82'	Stadium: SMH Group Stadium; Attendance: 8,589; Referee: Scott Jackson

1 January 2026 24	Oldham Athletic	1–1	Chesterfield	Oldham
15:00 GMT	Drummond 59', (yellow card) 59'; Ogle (yellow card) 66'; Robson (yellow card) 75'; Garner (penalty missed) 90+3'	Report	Lewis 21'; McFadzean (yellow card) 51' (yellow-red card) 90+2'	Stadium: Boundary Park; Attendance: 8,853 (1,440 away); Referee: Sam Allison

4 January 2026 25	Milton Keynes Dons	2–2	Chesterfield	Denbigh
12:00 GMT	Nemane (yellow card) 26'; Paterson 29'; Hepburn-Murphy 44'; Sanders (yellow card) 54'; Mellish (yellow card) 58'; Kelly (yellow card) 79'	Report	Lewis (yellow card) 6'; Curtis 67'; Grigg 90+4', (yellow card) 90+4'	Stadium: Stadium MK; Attendance: 7,019 (1,029 away); Referee: Andrew Miller
Note: Fixture was originally scheduled for a 15:00 kick-off, but was moved for live Sky Sports broadcasting.

17 January 2026 27	Chesterfield	0–0	Bromley	Chesterfield
12:30 GMT	Curtis (yellow card) 45+4'; Duffy (yellow card) 88'	Report	Kabamba (penalty missed) 89'	Stadium: SMH Group Stadium; Attendance: 7,432; Referee: Alex Chilowicz
Note: Fixture was originally scheduled for a 15:00 kick-off, but was rescheduled for live Sky Sports broadcasting.

24 January 2026 28	Newport County	2–1	Chesterfield	Newport
15:00 GMT	Biggins (yellow card) 6', (goal) 50'; Smith (yellow card) 45'; Spellman 63'; Glennon (yellow card) 90+4'	Report	Markanday 85'	Stadium: Rodney Parade; Attendance: 4,355; Referee: Declan Brown

27 January 2026 29	Salford City	0–1	Chesterfield	Kersal
19:45 GMT	Mnoga (yellow card) 63'; Graydon (yellow card) 88'	Report	Stirk (yellow card) 82'; Cooper 90+3' (o.g.)	Stadium: Moor Lane; Attendance: 2,630 (695 away); Referee: Oliver Yates

31 January 2026 30	Chesterfield	2–2	Walsall	Chesterfield
15:00 GMT	Grigg 13'; Markanday 20'	Report	Kanu 41'; Adomah 60'	Stadium: SMH Group Stadium; Attendance: 8,702; Referee: Charles Breakspear

7 February 2026 31	Bristol Rovers	2–3	Chesterfield	Horfield
15:00 GMT	Forde 28', 58', (yellow card) 90+6'; Mola (yellow card) 43'; Kilgour (yellow card) 75'	Report	Naylor 3', 61'; Bonis (yellow card) 48'; Berry 78'; Markanday (yellow card) 85'	Stadium: Memorial Stadium; Attendance: 8,210 (927 away); Referee: Matthew Russell

14 February 2026 32	Chesterfield	1–1	Harrogate Town	Chesterfield
15:00 GMT	Bonis 12', (yellow card) 57' (yellow-red card) 59'; Pearce (yellow card) 66'	Report	Brenan 84', (yellow card) 86'; Muldoon (yellow card) 89'	Stadium: SMH Group Stadium; Attendance: 7,808; Referee: Aaron Farmer

17 February 2026 33	Chesterfield	1–0	Gillingham	Chesterfield
19:45 GMT	Curtis 16'	Report	Beckles (yellow card) 23'; Hutton (yellow card) 31'; Coleman (yellow card) 88'	Stadium: SMH Group Stadium; Attendance: 7,520; Referee: Will Finnie

21 February 2026 34	Crawley Town	1–1	Chesterfield	Crawley
15:00 GMT	Gordon (yellow card) 49'; Richards (yellow card) 65'; Russell (yellow card) 73'; Bajrami (yellow card) 85'; Williams 90+5'	Report	Mandeville (yellow card) 9', (goal) 39'; Stirk (yellow card) 80'	Stadium: Broadfield Stadium; Attendance: 3,250; Referee: Paul Howard

28 February 2026 35	Barnet	1–0	Chesterfield	Edgware
15:00 GMT	Ofoborh 65'	Report		Stadium: The Hive Stadium; Attendance: 2,901; Referee: William Davis

3 March 2026 26	Chesterfield	3–0	Colchester United	Chesterfield
19:45 GMT	Grigg 26' (pen.); Markanday 39'; McFadzean (yellow card) 61'; Bonis 72'; Donacien (yellow card) 90+2'	Report	Bishop (yellow card) 24'; Tucker (yellow card) 30'; Araujo (yellow card) 87'; Gordon (yellow card) 90+3'	Stadium: SMH Group Stadium; Attendance: 7,348; Referee: Simon Mather
Note: Fixture was originally scheduled for 10 January, but it was postponed due to a frozen pitch.

7 March 2026 36	Chesterfield	2–3	Shrewsbury Town	Chesterfield
15:00 GMT	Naylor 31'; Pearce 85'; Dobra (yellow card) 90+2'	Report	Samuel-Ogunsuyi 45+2', 70', (yellow card) 84'; Cox (yellow card) 80'; Stubbs 90+3'	Stadium: SMH Group Stadium; Attendance: 8,118; Referee: Alan Dale

14 March 2026 37	Notts County	2–3	Chesterfield	Nottingham
12:30 GMT	Norburn (yellow card) 9' (yellow-red card) 19'; Swinkels 36' (o.g.); Tsaroulla (yellow card) 42'; Platt 45+1'; Bedeau (yellow card) 90+1'; Dennis (yellow card) 90+6'	Report	Dobra 16'; Curtis (yellow card) 23'; Swinkels (yellow card) 31'; Naylor 44', (yellow card) 45'; Mandeville 66'; Braybrooke (yellow card) 70'	Stadium: Meadow Lane; Attendance: 12,604 (1,954 Spireites); Referee: Matt Corlett
Note: Fixture was initially scheduled for a 15:00 kick-off, but was brought forward for Sky Sports broadcasting.

17 March 2026 38	Chesterfield	0–3	Oldham Athletic	Chesterfield
19:45 GMT	Dunkley (yellow card) 26'	Report	Drummond 22', 74'; Fondop 31'; Pett (yellow card) 86'	Stadium: SMH Group Stadium; Attendance: 8,148; Referee: Ross Joyce

21 March 2026 39	Accrington Stanley	0–1	Chesterfield	Accrington
15:00 GMT	Whalley (yellow card) 28'; Martin (yellow card) 58'	Report	Braybrooke (yellow card) 5'; Dickson 63'	Stadium: Crown Ground; Attendance: 2,688 (836 away); Referee: Harry Wager

3 April 2026 41	Chesterfield	1–0	Cheltenham Town	Chesterfield
15:00 BST	Dickson 25'; Mandeville (yellow card) 35'	Report	Cundy (yellow card) 54'	Stadium: SMH Group Stadium; Attendance: 8,072; Referee: James Durkin

6 April 2026 42	Barrow	0–1	Chesterfield	Barrow-in-Furness
15:00 BST	Rose (yellow card) 58'; McCann (yellow card) 89'	Report	Curtis (yellow card) 18'; McFadzean (yellow card) 45+2'; Berry 62'	Stadium: Holker Street; Attendance: 2,956 (511 away); Referee: Darren Drysdale

11 April 2026 43	Chesterfield	1–1	Tranmere Rovers	Chesterfield
15:00 BST	McFadzean (yellow card) 17'; Naylor 44'; Gordon (yellow card) 77'	Report	Patrick (penalty missed) 17'; Finley (yellow card) 19', (goal) 53'; Tamen (yellow card) 57'; Maroši (yellow card) 66'; Dennis (yellow card) 90+5'	Stadium: SMH Group Stadium; Attendance: 7,953; Referee: Seb Stockbridge

14 April 2026 40	Chesterfield	2–1	Grimsby Town	Chesterfield
19:45 BST	Mandeville 31'; Bonis 34'; Dobra (yellow card) 59'; Naylor (yellow card) 90+1'; Stirk (yellow card) 90+4'	Report	Kabia 41'; Cook (yellow card) 51'; Turi (yellow card) 63'; Staunton (yellow card) 82', (penalty missed) 90+5'	Stadium: SMH Group Stadium; Attendance: 8,661; Referee: Tom Reeves
Note: Fixture was initially scheduled for 28 March, but was needed to be rearranged due to international call-ups in the Grimsby squad.

18 April 2026 44	Fleetwood Town	1–1	Chesterfield	Fleetwood
15:00 BST	Evans 67'	Report	McFadzean (red card) 61'; Stirk 89'	Stadium: Highbury Stadium; Referee: Ross Martin

25 April 2026 45	Chesterfield	2–0	Crewe Alexandra	Chesterfield
15:00 BST	Bonis 36', 68'; Dobra (yellow card) 42'; Braybrooke (yellow card) 45'	Report	Pond (yellow card) 62'	Stadium: SMH Group Stadium; Attendance: 9,560; Referee: James Bell

2 May 2026 46	Swindon Town	1–2	Chesterfield	Swindon
15:00 BST	Wilson-Brown (yellow card) 18'; Middlemas 45+3', (yellow card) 75'; Hoilett (yellow card) 51'	Report	Bonis 19', (yellow card) 78'; Stirk (yellow card) 58'; Markanday 61'	Stadium: County Ground; Attendance: 12,989 (inc. 1,936 Chesterfield supporters); Referee: Scott Oldham

==== Play-offs ====
Chesterfield finished 6th in the regular season, and were drawn against Notts County whom finished in 5th.

10 May 2026 Semi-final first leg	Chesterfield	0–1	Notts County	Chesterfield
18:00 BST	Bonis (penalty missed) 6'; Curtis (yellow card) 36'	Report	Luker 28', (yellow card) 52'; Jones (yellow card) 42'; Tsaroulla (yellow card) 64'; Ness (yellow card) 88'	Stadium: SMH Group Stadium; Referee: Will Finnie

15 May 2026 Semi-final second leg	Notts County	0–0 (1–0 agg.)	Chesterfield	Nottingham
20:00 BST	Grant (yellow card) 90+8'	Report	McFadzean (yellow card) 59'	Stadium: Meadow Lane; Attendance: 17,224; Referee: Thomas Parsons

=== FA Cup ===
Chesterfield were drawn away to Stevenage in the first round and at home to Doncaster Rovers in the second round.

Win Draw Loss Fixtures

1 November 2025 First round	Stevenage	0–1	Chesterfield	Stevenage
15:00 GMT	Reid (yellow card) 16'; Pattenden (yellow card) 24'; Piergianni (yellow card) 59'; Butler (yellow card) 82'	Report	Dunkley (yellow card) 48'; Bonis 61' (pen.); Daley-Campbell (yellow card) 64'; Fleck (yellow card) 90+4'; Darcy (yellow card) 90+5'	Stadium: Broadhall Way; Attendance: 2,084; Referee: Alan Young

6 December 2025 Second round	Chesterfield	1–2	Doncaster Rovers	Chesterfield
19:30 GMT	Bonis 31', (yellow card) 57'; Fleck (red card) 60'	Report	Clifton (yellow card) 6'; Maxwell (yellow card) 31'; Bailey 34'; Senior 90'	Stadium: SMH Group Stadium; Attendance: 6,175; Referee: Neil Hair

=== EFL Cup ===
Chesterfield were drawn at home to Mansfield Town in the first round.

Win Draw Loss Fixtures

12 August 2025 First round	Chesterfield	0–2	Mansfield Town	Chesterfield
19:45 BST	Naylor (yellow card) 73'	Report	Bowery (yellow card) 1'; Oates 2'; Cargill (yellow card) 45'; Lewis (yellow card) 53'; Evans 59'; McDonnell (yellow card) 88'	Stadium: SMH Group Stadium; Attendance: 9,502; Referee: Adam Herczeg

=== EFL Trophy ===
Chesterfield were drawn against Burton Albion, Crewe Alexandra and Liverpool U21 in the group stage. After finishing second in the group stage, Chesterfield were drawn away to Doncaster Rovers in the round of 32.

Pos	Div	Team	Pld	W	PW	PL	L	GF	GA	GD	Pts	Qualification
1	L2	Crewe Alexandra	3	3	0	0	0	12	2	+10	9	Advance to Round 2
2	L2	Chesterfield	3	1	0	1	1	4	9	−5	4	Advance to Round 2
3	L1	Burton Albion	3	1	0	0	2	3	4	−1	3	
4	ACA	Liverpool U21	3	0	1	0	2	2	6	−4	2	

Source: EFL

Win Draw Loss Fixtures

2 September 2025 North Group H	Crewe Alexandra	7–1	Chesterfield	Crewe
19:00 BST	Tezgel 4', 6', 51'; Agius 16'; Moult 30'; Thibaut 57' (pen.); Armstrong 67'	Report	Lewis 21'; Grimes (yellow card) 56'	Stadium: Gresty Road; Attendance: 961; Referee: Greg Rollason

7 October 2025 North Group H	Chesterfield	1–0	Burton Albion	Chesterfield
19:00 BST	Naylor (yellow card) 33'; Bonis 79'	Report		Stadium: SMH Group Stadium; Attendance: 1,229; Referee: Alex Chilowicz

11 November 2025 North Group H	Chesterfield	2–2 (10–11 p)	Liverpool U21	Chesterfield
19:00 GMT	Hobson 62'; Duffy 64'	Report	Ramsay (yellow card) 5'; Gordon 76', 90+2'; Williams (yellow card) 90+4'	Stadium: SMH Group Stadium; Attendance: 2,631; Referee: Ross Joyce
	Penalties
	Fleck (penalty scored); Berry (penalty scored); Cook (penalty scored); Markanday (penalty missed); Darcy (penalty scored); Dickson (penalty scored); Sheckleford (penalty scored); Grimes (penalty scored); Daley-Campbell (penalty scored); Donacien (penalty scored); Boot (penalty scored); Fleck (penalty missed)		(penalty scored) Gordon; (penalty scored) Kelly; (penalty scored) Laffey; (penalty scored) Davidson; (penalty missed) Pilling; (penalty scored) Sonni-Lambie; (penalty scored) Pinnington; (penalty scored) Pitt; (penalty scored) Williams; (penalty scored) Lucky; (penalty scored) Mrozek; (penalty scored) Gordon

2 December 2025 Round of 32	Doncaster Rovers	5–1	Chesterfield	Doncaster
19:00 GMT	Sharp 15', 77'; Ajayi 19'; Senior 31'; Molyneux 90+1'	Report	Grimes (yellow card) 54'; Bonis 74'	Stadium: Eco-Power Stadium; Referee: James Oldham

== Statistics ==
=== Appearances and goals ===
Players with no appearances are not included on the list; italics indicate a loaned in player

No.	Pos	Nat	Player	Total		League Two		FA Cup		EFL Cup		EFL Trophy		League Two play-offs	
No.	Pos	Nat	Player	Apps	Goals	Apps	Goals	Apps	Goals	Apps	Goals	Apps	Goals	Apps	Goals
1	GK	(England) ENG	Zach Hemming	41	0	38+0	0	2+0	0	1+0	0	0+0	0	0+0	0
2	DF	(England) ENG	Malik Owolabi-Belewu	9	0	6+3	0	0+0	0	0+0	0	0+0	0	0+0	0
3	DF	(England) ENG	Adam Lewis	18	2	4+10	1	0+1	0	0+0	0	3+0	1	0+0	0
4	MF	(England) ENG	Tom Naylor	53	8	32+12	8	2+0	0	0+1	0	3+1	0	1+1	0
5	DF	(England) ENG	Jamie Grimes	8	0	4+0	0	0+0	0	0+0	0	3+1	0	0+0	0
6	DF	(England) ENG	Kyle McFadzean	43	2	36+1	2	2+0	0	1+0	0	1+0	0	2+0	0
7	MF	(England) ENG	Liam Mandeville	54	6	31+15	6	2+0	0	0+1	0	3+0	0	1+1	0
8	MF	(Wales) WAL	Ryan Stirk	44	1	36+2	1	1+0	0	1+0	0	0+2	0	2+0	0
9	FW	(Northern Ireland) NIR	Will Grigg	37	4	12+20	4	0+1	0	1+0	0	1+0	0	0+2	0
10	FW	(Northern Ireland) NIR	Lee Bonis	53	16	31+14	12	2+0	2	0+1	0	0+3	2	2+0	0
11	MF	(Republic of Ireland) IRL	Dylan Duffy	41	3	18+17	2	1+1	0	0+1	0	1+1	1	0+1	0
13	MF	(Scotland) SCO	John Fleck	20	1	7+7	1	1+1	0	0+0	0	2+1	0	0+1	0
15	MF	(England) ENG	Bailey Hobson	1	1	0+0	0	0+0	0	0+0	0	1+0	1	0+0	0
16	MF	(Scotland) SCO	Luke Butterfield	5	0	0+3	0	0+0	0	0+1	0	1+0	0	0+0	0
17	FW	(Albania) ALB	Armando Dobra	35	5	22+10	5	0+0	0	1+0	0	0+1	0	1+0	0
19	DF	(Scotland) SCO	Lewis Gordon	36	1	26+2	1	2+0	0	1+0	0	0+3	0	2+0	0
20	DF	(England) ENG	Vontae Daley-Campbell	24	0	13+6	0	1+0	0	1+0	0	2+1	0	0+0	0
21	FW	(Republic of Ireland) IRL	Paddy Madden	1	0	0+1	0	0+0	0	0+0	0	0+0	0	0+0	0
22	DF	(England) ENG	Chey Dunkley	32	1	28+0	1	2+0	0	1+0	0	1+0	0	0+0	0
23	GK	(England) ENG	Ryan Boot	14	0	8+0	0	0+0	0	0+0	0	4+0	0	2+0	0
24	FW	(England) ENG	Dilan Markanday	46	8	29+9	8	2+0	0	1+0	0	2+1	0	2+0	0
25	FW	(England) ENG	Will Dickson	27	3	6+17	3	0+0	0	0+0	0	3+0	0	0+1	0
26	DF	(Netherlands) NED	Sil Swinkels	24	0	22+0	0	0+0	0	0+0	0	0+0	0	2+0	0
28	FW	(England) ENG	James Berry	38	5	15+18	5	1+0	0	0+0	0	2+1	0	1+0	0
29	DF	(Republic of Ireland) IRL	Sam Curtis	24	2	21+1	2	0+0	0	0+0	0	0+0	0	1+1	0
36	MF	(England) ENG	Sammy Braybrooke	23	0	21+0	0	0+0	0	0+0	0	0+0	0	2+0	0
40	MF	(England) ENG	Connor Cook	3	0	0+0	0	0+0	0	0+0	0	1+2	0	0+0	0
41	FW	(Malta) MLT	Gunner Elliott	1	0	0+0	0	0+0	0	0+0	0	1+0	0	0+0	0
42	DF	(England) ENG	Alex Whitney	1	0	0+0	0	0+0	0	0+0	0	0+1	0	0+0	0
44	DF	(Saint Lucia) LCA	Janoi Donacien	25	0	2+18	0	0+1	0	0+0	0	2+0	0	1+1	0
45	FW	(England) ENG	Freddie Ladapo	7	0	1+6	0	0+0	0	0+0	0	0+0	0	0+0	0
46	DF	(England) ENG	Tom Pearce	12	1	10+1	1	0+0	0	0+0	0	0+0	0	0+1	0
Player(s) who featured but departed the club permanently during the season:
2	DF	(England) ENG	Ryheem Sheckleford	2	0	0+0	0	0+0	0	0+0	0	2+0	0	0+0	0
18	MF	(New Zealand) NZL	Matt Dibley-Dias	5	0	2+2	0	0+0	0	1+0	0	0+0	0	0+0	0
27	MF	(England) ENG	Ronan Darcy	31	3	15+9	3	0+2	0	1+0	0	3+1	0	0+0	0
30	DF	(Colombia) COL	Devan Tanton	18	0	11+4	0	1+0	0	0+0	0	2+0	0	0+0	0
