= 2024–25 Chesterfield F.C. season =

158th season in existence of Chesterfield FC

Chesterfield
2024–25 season
- Owner: Phil Kirk and Ashley Kirk
- Chairman: Mike Goodwin
- Manager: Paul Cook
- Stadium: SMH Group Stadium
- League Two: 7th
- FA Cup: Second round
- EFL Cup: First round
- EFL Trophy: Round of 16
- Top goalscorer: League: Will Grigg (12); All: Will Grigg (14)

The 2024–25 season was the 158th season in the history of Chesterfield Football Club and their first season back in League Two since the 2017–18 season, following promotion from the National League the previous season. The club participated in League Two, the FA Cup, the EFL Cup and the EFL Trophy.

== Transfers ==
=== In ===
Date	Pos.	Player	From	Fee	Ref.
14 June 2024 (Note: The transfer was announced on 16 May, and would become official on June 14 once the transfer window re-opens)	CM	Tim Akinola (ENG)	Free agent	—N/a	
1 July 2024 (Note: The transfer was announced on 9 May, and would become official on July 1 once his Macclesfield contract expired)	CF	Kane Drummond (ENG)	Macclesfield (ENG)	Free	
1 July 2024 (Note: The transfer was announced on 6 June, and would become official on July 1 once his Shrewsbury Town contract expired)	CB	Chey Dunkley (ENG)	Shrewsbury Town (ENG)	Free	
1 July 2024 (Note: The transfer was announced on 31 May, and would become official on July 1 once his Bristol Rovers contract expired)	LB	Lewis Gordon (SCO)	Bristol Rovers (ENG)	Free	
1 July 2024 (Note: The transfer was announced on 13 May, and would become official on July 1 once his Stockport County contract expired)	CF	Paddy Madden (IRL)	Stockport County (ENG)	Free	
1 August 2024	RB	Vontae Daley-Campbell (ENG)	Peterborough United (ENG)	Free	
10 September 2024	CM	John Fleck (SCO)	Blackburn Rovers (ENG)	Free	
12 January 2025	RB	Janoi Donacien (LCA)	Ipswich Town (ENG)	Free	
22 January 2025	CB	Kyle McFadzean (ENG)	Blackburn Rovers (ENG)	Free	
31 January 2025	LM	Dylan Duffy (IRL)	Lincoln City (ENG)	Undisclosed	

=== Out ===
Date	Pos.	Player	To	Fee	Ref.
30 August 2024	CF	Joe Quigley (IRL)	Forest Green Rovers (ENG)	Undisclosed	
22 January 2025	LW	James Berry (ENG)	Wycombe Wanderers (ENG)	Undisclosed	
5 February 2025	LB	Branden Horton (ENG)	Gateshead (ENG)	Free	
28 March 2025	CM	Tim Akinola (ENG)	Gateshead (ENG)	Free	

=== Loaned in ===
Date	Pos.	Player	From	Date until	Ref.
5 August 2024	RB	Devan Tanton (COL)	Fulham (ENG)	10 January 2025 (Note: On 10 January, Tanton was recalled to his parent club Fulham)	
15 August 2024	CB	Harvey Araujo (ENG)	Fulham (ENG)	End of season	
15 August 2024	RW	Dilan Markanday (ENG)	Blackburn Rovers (ENG)	16 January 2025 (Note: On 16 January, Markanday was recalled to his parent club Blackburn)	
29 August 2024	GK	Max Thompson (ENG)	Newcastle United (ENG)	End of season	
30 August 2024	CM	Jenson Metcalfe (ENG)	Everton (ENG)	End of season	
12 January 2025	CF	Aribim Pepple (CAN)	Luton Town (ENG)	End of season	
20 January 2025	LB	Jack Sparkes (ENG)	Peterborough United (ENG)	End of season	
27 January 2025	LM	Dylan Duffy (IRL)	Lincoln City (ENG)	31 January 2025 (Note: On 31 January, Duffy joined the club on a permanent basis)	
31 January 2025	RW	Michael Olakigbe (ENG)	Brentford (ENG)	End of season	

=== Loaned out ===
Date	Pos.	Player	To	Date until	Ref.
29 August 2024	CM	Tim Akinola (ENG)	Dagenham & Redbridge (ENG)	31 December 2024 (Note: On 31 December, Akinola was recalled from his loan at Dagenham.)	
13 September 2024	AM	Bailey Hobson (ENG)	Barnet (ENG)	6 December 2024 (Note: On 18 October, Hobson's loan at Barnet was extended until January, but on 6 December he was recalled.)	
4 October 2024	CF	Kane Drummond (ENG)	Oldham Athletic (ENG)	3 December 2024 (Note: On 3 December, Drummond was recalled from his loan at Oldham.)	
31 January 2025	LW	Liam Jessop (GIB)	Worksop Town (ENG)	End of season	
21 February 2025	CM	Tim Akinola (ENG)	Alfreton Town (ENG)	22 March 2025	

=== Released / Out of Contract ===
Date	Pos.	Player	Subsequent club	Join date	Ref.
30 June 2024	CB	Laurence Maguire (ENG)	Milton Keynes Dons (ENG)	1 July 2024	
30 June 2024	RW	Harley Curtis (ENG)	Needham Market (ENG)	7 July 2024	
30 June 2024	RB	Jeff King (ENG)	Swindon Town (ENG)	5 August 2024	
30 June 2024	LB	Bailey Clements (ENG)	Hornchurch (ENG)	16 August 2024	
30 June 2024	GK	Luke Chadwick (ENG)			

== Pre-season and friendlies ==
On 25 April, Chesterfield announced their first pre-season friendly, against Matlock Town. A month later, home fixtures against Sheffield United and Derby County were also confirmed. On June 21, a fourth friendly fixture was added, against Scunthorpe United. Three days later, a home fixture versus Nottingham Forest was announced.

Win Draw Loss Fixtures

6 July 2024 Friendly	Matlock Town	0–0	Chesterfield	Matlock
14:00 BST		Report		Stadium: Causeway Lane

13 July 2024 Friendly	Chesterfield	0–3	Nottingham Forest	Chesterfield
15:00 BST		Report	Wood 68'; Bowler 75'; Sangaré 90+3'	Stadium: SMH Group Stadium; Attendance: 7,368

16 July 2024 Friendly	Alfreton Town	1–2	Chesterfield	Alfreton
19:30 BST	Trialist 16'	Report	Berry 51'; Naylor 78'	Stadium: North Street

20 July 2024 Friendly	Chesterfield	0–3	Sheffield United	Chesterfield
15:00 BST		Report	Osula 20'; Dozzell 78'; Hampson 89'	Stadium: SMH Group Stadium; Attendance: 7,619

24 July 2024 Friendly	Chesterfield	4–0	Derby County	Chesterfield
19:30 BST	Banks 42'; Grigg 45'; Berry 78', 87'	Report		Stadium: SMH Group Stadium

2 August 2024 Friendly	Scunthorpe United	0–3	Chesterfield	Scunthorpe
19:30 BST		Report	Jacobs; Colclough 18'; Mandeville	Stadium: Glanford Park

== Competitions ==
=== League Two ===
==== League table ====
Pos	Team	Pld	W	D	L	GF	GA	GD	Pts	Promotion, qualification or relegation
5	AFC Wimbledon (O, P)	46	20	13	13	56	35	+21	73	Qualification for League Two play-offs
6	Notts County	46	20	12	14	68	49	+19	72	Qualification for League Two play-offs
7	Chesterfield	46	19	13	14	73	54	+19	70	Qualification for League Two play-offs
8	Salford City	46	18	15	13	64	54	+10	69	
9	Grimsby Town	46	20	8	18	61	67	−6	68	

Source: EFL Official Website
Rules for classification: 1) Points; 2) Goal difference; 3) Number of goals scored; 4) Head-to-head results; 5) Wins; 6) Away goals; 7) Penalty points (sec 9.5); 8) 12-point sending off offences
(O) Play-off winners; (P) Promoted

==== Results summary ====
Overall								Home						Away					
Pld	W	D	L	GF	GA	GD	Pts	W	D	L	GF	GA	GD	W	D	L	GF	GA	GD
46	19	13	14	73	54	+19	70	10	10	3	41	27	+14	9	3	11	32	27	+5

Last updated: 26 April 2025.
Source: Soccerway

==== Results by round ====
Round	1	2	3	4	5	6	7	8	9	10	11	12	13	14	15	16	17	18	19	20	21	22	23	24	27	28	29	30	31	32	33	34	35	36	26^{2}	37	38	39	40	41	25^{1}	42	43	44	45	46
Ground	H	A	H	A	H	A	H	A	A	H	H	A	H	A	H	A	H	A	H	A	H	A	A	H	A	H	H	A	H	A	A	H	A	H	A	A	H	A	H	A	H	H	A	H	H	A
Result	D	W	D	L	W	L	D	W	D	D	D	W	D	W	L	L	W	L	W	W	W	L	L	L	D	D	W	L	W	L	L	L	L	W	W	W	D	W	W	L	D	W	D	D	W	W
Position	11	4	9	12	9	11	10	9	10	12	12	10	9	6	9	11	7	9	8	6	5	6	9	10	10	10	10	10	10	10	13	15	16	15	12	12	11	11	10	10	10	9	9	10	9	7
Points	1	4	5	5	8	8	9	12	13	14	15	18	19	22	22	22	25	25	28	31	34	34	34	34	35	36	39	39	42	42	42	42	42	45	48	51	52	55	58	58	59	62	63	64	67	70

Source: EFL
A = Away; H = Home; W = Win; D = Draw; L = Loss; P = Postponed
Notes:
- ^{1} Matchday 25 (vs. Gillingham) was postponed due to adverse weather conditions
- ^{2} Matchday 26 (vs. Salford City) was postponed due to FA Cup involvements

==== Matches ====
On 26 June, the League Two fixtures were announced.

Win Draw Loss Fixtures

9 August 2024 1	Chesterfield	1–1	Swindon Town	Chesterfield
20:00 BST	Dobra 15'	Report	King (yellow card) 17'; Cotterill (yellow card) 42'; Smith (yellow card) 55'; Wright 64', (yellow card) 66'; Clarke (yellow card) 89'	Stadium: SMH Group Stadium; Attendance: 9,262; Referee: Scott Oldham

17 August 2024 2	Crewe Alexandra	0–5	Chesterfield	Crewe
15:00 BST		Report	Berry-McNally 1', 12'; Grigg 11' (yellow card) 62'; Naylor 28' (yellow card) 87'; Daley-Campbell (yellow card) 47'; Dobra 49'	Stadium: Gresty Road; Attendance: 5,626; Referee: Scott Tallis

24 August 2024 3	Chesterfield	1–1	Salford City	Chesterfield
15:00 BST	Banks (yellow card) 63'; Berry 69'; Naylor (yellow card) 90'	Report	Woodburn (yellow card) 45+4'; Taylor (yellow card) 56'; Austerfield (yellow card) 62'; Fornah (yellow card) 63'; Garbutt (yellow card) 67'; Tilt (yellow card) 71' (yellow-red card) 71'	Stadium: SMH Group Stadium; Attendance: 8,334; Referee: Richie Watkins

31 August 2024 4	Gillingham	1–0	Chesterfield	Gillingham
12:30 BST	Ogie (yellow card) 1'; McKenzie 8'; Clark (yellow card) 37'; Ehmer (yellow card) 56' (yellow-red card) 60'	Report	Dunkley (yellow card) 90+3' (yellow-red card) 90+5'; Naylor (yellow card) 90+3'; Metcalfe (yellow card) 90+6'	Stadium: Priestfield Stadium; Attendance: 6,954; Referee: Charles Breakspear
Note: Fixture was initially scheduled for a 15:00 kick-off, but was moved for live Sky Sports broadcast.

7 September 2024 5	Chesterfield	2–1	Grimsby Town	Chesterfield
15:00 BST	Oldaker (yellow card) 24' (yellow-red card) 67'; Berry 27'; Grimes (yellow card) 39'; Markanday 45+2'; Grigg (yellow card) 90+3'	Report	Warren (yellow card) 26'; Vernam 50', (yellow card) 58'; Rose (yellow card) 62'; Carson (yellow card) 90+1'	Stadium: SMH Group Stadium; Attendance: 9,325; Referee: Geoff Eltringham

14 September 2024 6	Port Vale	1–0	Chesterfield	Burslem
15:00 BST	Chislett 11', (yellow card) 15'; Garrity (yellow card) 44'; John (yellow card) 75'; Tolaj (yellow card) 83'; Stockley (yellow card) 84'; Paton (yellow card) 90+5'	Report		Stadium: Vale Park; Attendance: 7,976; Referee: Neil Hair

21 September 2024 7	Chesterfield	1–1	Cheltenham Town	Chesterfield
12:30 BST	Naylor (yellow card) 21'; Markanday 27'; Tanton (yellow card) 53'; Oldaker (yellow card) 84'	Report	Jude-Boyd 53'; Stubbs (yellow card) 57'	Stadium: SMH Group Stadium; Attendance: 7,652; Referee: Ross Joyce
Note: Fixture was initially scheduled for a 15:00 kick-off, but was moved for live Sky Sports broadcast.

28 September 2024 8	Doncaster Rovers	0–3	Chesterfield	Doncaster
15:00 GMT	Fleming (yellow card) 17'; McGrath (yellow card) 41'; Molyneux (yellow card) 45+4' (yellow-red card) 49'; Yeboah (yellow card) 79'; Sharp (yellow card) 80'; Anderson (red card) 85'	Report	Dunkley 31'; Madden (yellow card) 38', (goal) 59' (pen.); Berry (yellow card) 75', (goal) 90+5'	Stadium: Eco-Power Stadium; Attendance: 10,790; Referee: James Bell

1 October 2024 9	Bromley	2–2	Chesterfield	Bromley
19:45 GMT	Olomola 14'; Cheek 50'	Report	Grigg 19', 37'; Metcalfe (yellow card) 89'	Stadium: Hayes Lane; Referee: Craig Hicks

5 October 2024 10	Chesterfield	2–2	Walsall	Chesterfield
15:00 BST	Oldaker 45+1'; Markanday 67'	Report	Lowe 33', 46'	Stadium: SMH Group Stadium; Attendance: 9,035; Referee: Seb Stockbridge

12 October 2024 11	Chesterfield	2–2	Notts County	Chesterfield
12:30 GMT	Madden 6'; Metcalfe (yellow card) 64'; Grigg 74'; Banks (yellow card) 90'; Naylor (yellow card) 90+3'	Report	Jatta 14'; Palmer (yellow card) 55'; Macari (yellow card) 64'; Crowley (yellow card) 87'; McGoldrick (penalty missed) 90+4', 90+4'	Stadium: SMH Group Stadium; Referee: Matthew Corlett
Note: Fixture was initially scheduled for a 15:00 kick-off, but was moved for live Sky Sports broadcast.

18 October 2024 12	Newport County	0–3	Chesterfield	Newport
20:00 GMT	Antwi (yellow card) 40'; Wildig (yellow card) 48'; Hudlin (yellow card) 90+1'	Report	Markanday 1'; Oldaker (yellow card) 3'; Araujo (yellow card) 56'; Grigg 84', 87'	Stadium: Rodney Parade; Attendance: 4,570; Referee: Thomas Parsons
Note: Fixture was initially scheduled for 19 October, but was moved for live Sky Sports broadcast.

22 October 2024 13	Chesterfield	1–1	Colchester United	Chesterfield
19:45 GMT	Grigg 64'; Oldaker (yellow card) 90+6'; Dobra (yellow card) 90+6'	Report	Payne 6', (yellow card) 75'; Goodliffe (yellow card) 11'; Taylor (yellow card) 90+6'	Stadium: SMH Group Stadium; Attendance: 7,465; Referee: Dale Baines

26 October 2024 14	Morecambe	2–5	Chesterfield	Morecambe
12:30 BST	Tollitt 10'; Dackers (yellow card) 22'; Naylor 61' (o.g.); Stott (yellow card) 84'; White (yellow card) 86'; Edwards (yellow card) 89'	Report	Markanday 8'; Oldaker 48'; Grigg (yellow card) 67'; Metcalfe (yellow card) 68'; Berry 74'; Dobra 81'; Grimes 89'	Stadium: Mazuma Mobile Stadium; Attendance: 7,366; Referee: Tom Reeves
Note: Fixture was initially scheduled for a 15:00 kick-off, but was moved for live Sky Sports broadcast.

9 November 2024 15	Chesterfield	0–3	Accrington Stanley	Chesterfield
15:00 GMT	Oldaker (yellow card) 70'; Naylor (yellow card) 78'	Report	Woods 18'; Aljofree (yellow card) 34'; Coyle (yellow card) 51'; Awe 65'; Knowles 69'; Walton (yellow card) 72'	Stadium: SMH Group Stadium; Attendance: 8,285; Referee: Darren Drysdale

16 November 2024 16	Harrogate Town	2–1	Chesterfield	Harrogate
15:00 GMT	Moon (yellow card) 17'; Sims 57'; Asare (yellow card) 67'; Falkingham (yellow card) 73'; Cornelius 90+1'	Report	Banks (yellow card) 28'; Tanton (yellow card) 45'; Grigg (yellow card) 57'; Berry 77'; Naylor (yellow card) 90+4'; Dobra (yellow card) 90+5'	Stadium: Wetherby Road; Attendance: 3,686; Referee: John Mulligan

23 November 2024 17	Chesterfield	1–0	Barrow	Chesterfield
15:00 GMT	Araujo (yellow card) 7'; Williams (yellow card) 27'; Grimes 89'	Report	Dallas (yellow card) 49'; Campbell (yellow card) 61'; Telford (yellow card) 90+4'	Stadium: SMH Group Stadium; Attendance: 7,701; Referee: Steven Copeland

3 December 2024 18	Milton Keynes Dons	3–0	Chesterfield	Denbigh
19:45 GMT	Hogan 1'; Gilbey 26', 82'; Wearne (yellow card) 61'	Report	Oldaker (yellow card) 13' (yellow-red card) 24'; Araujo (yellow card) 31'; Banks (yellow card) 82'; Gordon (yellow card) 84'	Stadium: Stadium MK; Attendance: 5,903; Referee: Carl Brook

7 December 2024 19	Chesterfield	3–0	Tranmere Rovers	Chesterfield
15:00 GMT	Colclough 29'; Dobra 44'; Araujo (yellow card) 63'; Sheckleford (yellow card) 77'; Drummond 86'	Report	Drysdale (yellow card) 14'; Finley (yellow card) 88'; Saunders (yellow card) 90+3'	Stadium: SMH Group Stadium; Attendance: 7,923; Referee: Lee Swabey

14 December 2024 20	Carlisle United	0–2	Chesterfield	Carlisle
15:00 GMT	Vela (yellow card) 32'; Kelly (yellow card) 52'; Hayden (yellow card) 67'	Report	Markanday 25'; Grimes (yellow card) 52'; Banks (yellow card) 73'; Grigg 75'	Stadium: Brunton Park; Attendance: 6,586; Referee: Scott Simpson

21 December 2024 21	Chesterfield	1–0	AFC Wimbledon	Chesterfield
15:00 GMT	Dobra 3'; Banks (yellow card) 77'; Horton (yellow card) 90+3'	Report	Hutchinson (yellow card) 18'; O'Toole (yellow card) 69'	Stadium: SMH Group Stadium; Attendance: 8,555; Referee: Aaron Bannister

26 December 2024 22	Fleetwood Town	2–0	Chesterfield	Fleetwood
15:00 GMT	Virtue 28'; Bonds (yellow card) 38'; Sarpong-Wiredu (yellow card) 48'; Potter (yellow card) 72'; Harratt 87'	Report	Drummond (yellow card) 61'; Araujo (yellow card) 80'	Stadium: Highbury Stadium; Attendance: 3,469; Referee: Ben Speedie

29 December 2024 23	Bradford City	2–1	Chesterfield	Bradford
15:00 GMT	Baldwin (yellow card) 23'; Halliday (yellow card) 24'; Benn (yellow card) 31'; Pointon 42'; Sarcevic 52'; Oduor (yellow card) 82'	Report	Drummond (yellow card) 22'; Dobra 35', (yellow card) 90'	Stadium: Valley Parade; Attendance: 18,730; Referee: Adam Herczeg

1 January 2025 24	Chesterfield	1–2	Milton Keynes Dons	Chesterfield
15:00 GMT	Dobra (yellow card) 45+2'; Mandeville (yellow card) 51'; Oldaker 76'; Colclough (yellow card) 90+4'	Report	Harrison (yellow card) 14'; Hendry 18'; White 44'; Offord (yellow card) 58'; Nemane (yellow card) 75'; Sherring (yellow card) 90+1'	Stadium: SMH Group Stadium; Attendance: 9,119; Referee: Elliot Bell

18 January 2025 27	Grimsby Town	1–1	Chesterfield	Cleethorpes
15:00 GMT	Davies 17'; Svanþórsson (yellow card) 57'; Hume (yellow card) 85'	Report	Naylor 34', (yellow card) 70'; Fleck (yellow card) 90+2'	Stadium: Blundell Park; Attendance: 6,706; Referee: Jeremy Simpson

25 January 2025 28	Chesterfield	1–1	Port Vale	Chesterfield
15:00 GMT	Dobra (yellow card) 45+2', (goal) 76'	Report	Stockley 2'; Harper (yellow card) 21'; Croasdale (yellow card) 45'; Clark (red card) 51'; Hall (yellow card) 90+1'	Stadium: SMH Group Stadium; Attendance: 9,077; Referee: Andrew Humphries

28 January 2025 29	Chesterfield	3–0	Bromley	Chesterfield
19:45 GMT	Dobra 36'; Colclough 82'; Madden 90+1'	Report	Sowunmi (red card) 23'	Stadium: SMH Group Stadium; Attendance: 7,192; Referee: Ollie Yates

1 February 2025 30	Cheltenham Town	1–0	Chesterfield	Cheltenham
12:30 GMT	Kinsella (yellow card) 61'; Thomas (yellow card) 69'; Jude-Boyd 90+2'	Report	Duffy (yellow card) 8'; Olakigbe (yellow card) 45'; Grimes (yellow card) 66'	Stadium: Whaddon Road; Attendance: 3,869; Referee: Jacob Miles
Note: Fixture was initially scheduled for a 15:00 kick-off, but was for live Sky Sports broadcasting.

6 February 2025 31	Chesterfield	5–2	Doncaster Rovers	Chesterfield
19:45 GMT	Duffy 11'; Dobra (yellow card) 29'; Pepple 37', 59'; Olakigbe 54'; Sparkes (yellow card) 84'; Banks 90+4'	Report	Molyneux (yellow card) 42', (goal) 45+4'; Crewe (yellow card) 56'; Sterry (yellow card) 68'; McGrath (yellow card) 75'; Ironside 90+3'	Stadium: SMH Group Stadium; Attendance: 8,707; Referee: Greg Rollason
Note: Fixture was initially scheduled for 8 February, but was rearranged due to Doncaster's FA Cup involvements.

15 February 2025 32	Walsall	3–1	Chesterfield	Bescot
15:00 GMT	Williams (yellow card) 37'; Matt 52'; Harrison 55'; Jellis (yellow card) 78'; Amantchi 90+11'	Report	Grimes 8'; Thompson (yellow card) 31'; Dobra (yellow card) 55'	Stadium: Bescot Stadium; Attendance: 6,830; Referee: Sunny Singh Gill

22 February 2025 33	Swindon Town	1-0	Chesterfield	Swindon
15:00 GMT	Tshimanga 61' (pen.)	Report		Stadium: County Ground; Attendance: 7,531; Referee: Charles Breakspear

1 March 2025 34	Chesterfield	1–3	Crewe Alexandra	Chesterfield
15:00 GMT	Duffy 87'	Report	Tracey 11'; Conway 22'; Lowery 90+3'	Stadium: SMH Group Stadium; Attendance: 8,919; Referee: Scott Tallis

4 March 2025 35	Colchester United	1–0	Chesterfield	Colchester
19:45 GMT	Gordon 59'	Report	Mandeville (yellow card) 66'; Sparkes (yellow card) 69'; Sheckleford (yellow card) 75'; Madden (red card) 89'	Stadium: Colchester Community Stadium; Attendance: 3,774; Referee: James Durkin

8 March 2025 36	Chesterfield	2–1	Newport County	Chesterfield
15:00 GMT	Banks 42'; Pepple 44'; Mandeville (yellow card) 78'; Dobra (yellow card) 81'	Report	Baker 40'	Stadium: SMH Group Stadium; Attendance: 7,692; Referee: Michael Barlow

11 March 2025 26	Salford City	0–4	Chesterfield	Kersal
19:45 GMT		Report	Mandeville 40', 90+6'; Pepple 43'; Dobra 59'	Stadium: Moor Lane; Attendance: 2,289; Referee: Darren Drysdale
Note: Fixture was initially scheduled for 11 January, but was moved due to Salford's involvement in the FA Cup.

15 March 2025 37	Notts County	1–2	Chesterfield	Nottingham
15:00 GMT	Jarvis 81'	Report	Pepple 70'; Naylor 88'	Stadium: Meadow Lane; Attendance: 13,229; Referee: David Rock

22 March 2025 38	Chesterfield	0–0	Harrogate Town	Chesterfield
15:00 GMT		Report	Morris (yellow card) 21'	Stadium: SMH Group Stadium; Attendance: 8,540; Referee: Benjamin Speedie

29 March 2025 39	Barrow	0–1	Chesterfield	Barrow-in-Furness
15:00 GMT	Williams (yellow card) 51'; Campbell (yellow card) 84'; Kouyaté (yellow card) 88'	Report	Grimes (yellow card) 53'; Jacobs 78'	Stadium: Holker Street; Attendance: 3,392; Referee: Simon Mather

1 April 2025 40	Chesterfield	2–1	Carlisle United	Chesterfield
19:45 BST	Mandeville 73'; Madden 81'	Report	Embleton (red card) 40'; Hugill (yellow card) 70', (goal) 89'; Thomas (yellow card) 90+3'	Stadium: SMH Group Stadium; Attendance: 7,508; Referee: Andrew Humphries

5 April 2025 41	Tranmere Rovers	4–0	Chesterfield	Birkenhead
12:45 GMT	Norman 46'; Hendry 54'; Davison 85'; Finley 89'	Report	Gordon (yellow card) 20'; Dobra (yellow card) 60'; Fleck (yellow card) 90+2'	Stadium: Prenton Park; Attendance: 6,316; Referee: Tom Reeves
Note: Fixture was initially scheduled for a 15:00 kick-off, but was due to the Grand National also taking place the same day.

8 April 2025 25	Chesterfield	1–1	Gillingham	Chesterfield
19:45 BST	Grigg 77'	Report	Nevitt (yellow card) 14'; Gale (yellow card) 48'; Rowe (yellow card) 65'	Stadium: SMH Group Stadium; Attendance: 7,810; Referee: Martin Woods
Note: Fixture was initially scheduled for 4 January, but was moved due to Gillingham playing the Thursday prior. The match was then postponed on that date due to adverse weather conditions.

12 April 2025 42	Chesterfield	3–0	Fleetwood Town	Chesterfield
15:00 BST	Colclough 55'; Palmer 69'; Madden 78'	Report	Helm (yellow card) 14'	Stadium: SMH Group Stadium; Attendance: 7,739; Referee: Ross Joyce

18 April 2025 43	AFC Wimbledon	0–0	Chesterfield	Wimbledon
10:00 GMT	Johnson (yellow card) 31'; Kelly (yellow card) 45+2'; Tilley (yellow card) 67'; Neufville (yellow card) 87'	Report	Mandeville (yellow card) 90+3'	Stadium: Plough Lane; Attendance: 8,506; Referee: Carl Brook

21 April 2025 44	Chesterfield	3–3	Bradford City	Chesterfield
15:00 BST	McFadzean (yellow card) 30'; Mandeville (yellow card) 33', (goal) 90+2'; Colclough (yellow card) 45'; Metcalfe 45+2'; Araujo (yellow card) 63'; Grigg 71'; Olakigbe (yellow card) 90+4'	Report	Pointon 10'; Sarcevic 19' (pen.); Pattison (yellow card) 43', (goal) 49'; S. Walker (yellow card) 75'; Shepherd (yellow card) 90+1'; J. Walker (yellow card) 90+8'	Stadium: SMH Group Stadium; Attendance: 9,520; Referee: Scott Jackson

26 April 2025 45	Chesterfield	4–1	Morecambe	Chesterfield
15:00 BST	McFadzean (yellow card) 17'; Grigg 45+1'; Palmer 61'; Olakigbe 75'; Naylor 80'	Report	Taylor (yellow card) 56'; Slew 59'; Stott (yellow card) 80'	Stadium: SMH Group Stadium; Attendance: 8,725; Referee: Matt Corlett

3 May 2025 46	Accrington Stanley	0–1	Chesterfield	Accrington
15:00 BST		Report	Grigg 32'; McFadzean (yellow card) 78'	Stadium: Crown Ground; Attendance: 3,969; Referee: Thomas Parsons

==== Play-offs ====
Chesterfield finished 7th in the regular season, and were drawn against 4th place Walsall with the first leg at home and the second leg away.

11 May 2025 Friendly	Chesterfield	0–2	Walsall	Chesterfield
15:30 BST	Olakigbe (yellow card) 14'	Report	Allen 28' (pen.); Chang 39'	Stadium: SMH Group Stadium; Attendance: 10,001; Referee: Martin Coy

16 May 2025 Friendly	Walsall	2–1 (4–1 agg.)	Chesterfield	Bescot
20:00 BST	Asiimwe (yellow card) 36'; Allen (yellow card) 60'; Lakin 81'; Amantchi 90+5', (yellow card) 90+6'	Report	Metcalfe (yellow card) 51'; Fleck (yellow card) 65'; Dobra (yellow card) 76', (goal) 90+4'	Stadium: Bescot Stadium; Attendance: 9,585; Referee: Ben Toner

=== FA Cup ===
Chesterfield were drawn at home to Horsham in the first round, and then away to Exeter City in the second round.

Win Draw Loss Fixtures

2 November 2024 First round	Chesterfield	3–1	Horsham	Chesterfield
15:00 GMT	Grigg 6', 49'; Dobra 65'	Report	Hester-Cook (yellow card) 12'; Dickson 85', (yellow card) 90'	Stadium: SMH Group Stadium; Attendance: 4,887; Referee: Martin Coy

30 November 2024 Second round	Exeter City	2–0	Chesterfield	Exeter
15:00 GMT	Crama 45+2'; Woods (yellow card) 47'; Francis (yellow card) 54'; Magennis 69'	Report	Oldaker (yellow card) 48'	Stadium: St James Park; Attendance: 4,782; Referee: Jacob Miles

=== EFL Cup ===
On 27 June, the draw for the first round was made, with Chesterfield being drawn away against Derby County.

Win Draw Loss Fixtures

13 August 2024 First round	Derby County	2–1	Chesterfield	Derby
19:45 BST	Thompson 38'; Jackson 68'	Report	Dobra 29'; Daley-Campbell (yellow card) 86'	Stadium: Pride Park Stadium; Attendance: 8,358; Referee: Leigh Doughty

=== EFL Trophy ===
In the group stage, Chesterfield were drawn into Northern Group G alongside Grimsby Town, Lincoln City and Manchester City U21. Chesterfield were then drawn at home to Wigan Athletic in the round of 32 and to Rotherham United in the round of 16.

==== Group stage ====
Pos	Div	Team	Pld	W	PW	PL	L	GF	GA	GD	Pts	Qualification
1	L2	Chesterfield	3	2	1	0	0	5	3	+2	8	Advance to Round 2
2	L1	Lincoln City	3	2	0	0	1	7	2	+5	6	Advance to Round 2
3	ACA	Manchester City U21	3	0	1	1	1	2	7	−5	3	
4	L2	Grimsby Town	3	0	0	1	2	4	6	−2	1	

Source: EFL

Win Draw Loss Fixtures

20 August 2024 Group stage	Cheserfield	1–1 (4–2 p)	Manchester City U21	Chesterfield
19:00 GMT	Grimes (yellow card) 51'; Oldaker 79'	Report	Wright 52'; O'Reilly (yellow card) 56'	Stadium: SMH Group Stadium; Attendance: 2,446; Referee: Elliot Bell
	Penalties
	Oldaker (penalty scored); Drummond (penalty scored); Cook (penalty scored); Berry (penalty scored)		(penalty missed) Wright; (penalty scored) Mukasa; (penalty scored) O'Reilly; (penalty missed) Dickson

3 September 2024 Group stage	Lincoln City	0–1	Chesterfield	Lincoln
19:00 GMT	Erhahon (yellow card) 60'; O'Connor (yellow card) 69'; Gallagher (yellow card) 74'; Jefferies (yellow card) 80'; Earley (yellow card) 87'	Report	Jones (yellow card) 27'; Daley-Campbell (yellow card) 46'; Cook 55'; Oldaker (yellow card) 74'	Stadium: Sincil Bank; Attendance: 2,208; Referee: Ruebyn Ricardo

12 November 2024 Group stage	Chesterfield	3–2	Grimsby Town	Chesterfield
19:00 GMT	Berry 8', 58'; Madden 39'; Naylor (yellow card) 70'	Report	Cass 18'; Gardner 47'; Cribb (yellow card) 90+6'	Stadium: SMH Group Stadium; Attendance: 1,538; Referee: Michael Barlow

==== Knoutout stages ====
10 December 2024 Round of 32	Chesterfield	3–2	Wigan Athletic	Chesterfield
19:00 GMT	Dobra 3', (yellow card) 38'; Horton (yellow card) 65'; Berry 78' (pen.); Grigg (yellow card) 83'; Markanday 87'	Report	McManaman 19'; Sze (yellow card) 24'; Smith (yellow card) 83'; Hugill 90+1'	Stadium: SMH Group Stadium; Attendance: 1,583; Referee: Greg Rollason

14 January 2025 Round of 16	Chesterfield	0–0 (3–4 p)	Rotherham United	Chesterfield
19:00 GMT	Dobra (yellow card) 90+1'	Report	Kelly (yellow card) 52'; Odoffin (yellow card) 57'; Jules (yellow card) 69'; Nombe (yellow card) 90+3'	Stadium: SMH Group Stadium; Attendance: 3,517; Referee: Scott Oldham
	Penalties
	Banks (penalty scored); Dobra (penalty scored); Drummond (penalty missed); Cook (penalty scored); Oldaker (penalty missed)		Clarke-Harris (penalty scored); Nombe (penalty scored); Odoffin (penalty scored); Powell (penalty missed); Humphreys (penalty scored)

== Statistics ==
=== Appearances and goals ===
Players with no appearances are not included on the list
Italics indicate a loaned in player

No.	Pos	Nat	Player	Total		League Two		FA Cup		EFL Cup		EFL Trophy		League Two play-offs	
No.	Pos	Nat	Player	Apps	Goals	Apps	Goals	Apps	Goals	Apps	Goals	Apps	Goals	Apps	Goals
1	GK	(England) ENG	Max Thompson	21	0	18+0	0	2+0	0	0+0	0	1+0	0	0+0	0
2	DF	(England) ENG	Ryheem Sheckleford	19	0	15+2	0	1+0	0	0+0	0	1+0	0	0+0	0
4	MF	(England) ENG	Tom Naylor	47	4	37+3	4	2+0	0	1+0	0	1+1	0	2+0	0
5	DF	(England) ENG	Jamie Grimes	42	3	24+11	3	1+0	0	0+1	0	5+0	0	0+0	0
6	DF	(England) ENG	Harvey Araujo	23	0	15+5	0	1+0	0	0+0	0	2+0	0	0+0	0
7	MF	(England) ENG	Liam Mandeville	50	4	33+9	4	0+2	0	0+0	0	3+1	0	2+0	0
8	MF	(England) ENG	Darren Oldaker	40	4	26+6	3	2+0	0	1+0	0	2+3	1	0+0	0
9	FW	(Northern Ireland) NIR	Will Grigg	37	14	21+9	12	2+0	2	0+0	0	0+3	0	1+1	0
10	FW	(England) ENG	Michael Jacobs	25	1	2+15	1	2+0	0	0+1	0	3+0	0	0+2	0
11	FW	(England) ENG	Ryan Colclough	42	3	13+23	3	1+1	0	0+0	0	1+1	0	1+1	0
12	DF	(England) ENG	Tyrone Williams	14	0	9+1	0	1+0	0	0+0	0	3+0	0	0+0	0
13	MF	(Scotland) SCO	John Fleck	20	0	7+9	0	0+1	0	0+0	0	1+0	0	2+0	0
15	MF	(England) ENG	Bailey Hobson	16	0	4+7	0	0+0	0	1+0	0	4+0	0	0+0	0
17	FW	(Albania) ALB	Armando Dobra	51	13	36+6	9	1+1	1	1+0	1	2+2	1	1+1	1
18	MF	(Republic of Ireland) IRL	Dylan Duffy	20	2	8+10	2	0+0	0	0+0	0	0+0	0	0+2	0
19	DF	(Scotland) SCO	Lewis Gordon	39	0	29+4	0	1+1	0	1+0	0	0+1	0	2+0	0
20	DF	(England) ENG	Vontae Daley-Campbell	12	0	6+3	0	0+0	0	0+1	0	1+1	0	0+0	0
21	DF	(England) ENG	Ash Palmer	17	2	15+0	2	0+0	0	0+0	0	0+0	0	2+0	0
22	DF	(England) ENG	Chey Dunkley	11	1	9+0	1	0+0	0	1+0	0	1+0	0	0+0	0
23	GK	(England) ENG	Ryan Boot	34	0	28+0	0	0+0	0	1+0	0	3+0	0	2+0	0
24	DF	(England) ENG	Jack Sparkes	12	0	10+0	0	0+0	0	0+0	0	0+0	0	0+2	0
25	DF	(England) ENG	Kyle McFadzean	10	0	8+0	0	0+0	0	0+0	0	0+0	0	2+0	0
26	MF	(England) ENG	Jenson Metcalfe	31	1	20+8	1	1+0	0	0+0	0	0+0	0	2+0	0
27	FW	(Canada) CAN	Aribim Pepple	23	5	14+6	5	0+0	0	0+0	0	1+0	0	1+1	0
28	MF	(England) ENG	Ollie Banks	45	2	25+14	2	0+2	0	1+0	0	1+1	0	1+0	0
31	FW	(England) ENG	Kane Drummond	19	1	4+10	1	0+0	0	0+1	0	3+1	0	0+0	0
33	FW	(Republic of Ireland) IRL	Paddy Madden	29	6	9+18	5	0+1	0	0+0	0	1+0	1	0+0	0
34	FW	(England) ENG	Michael Olakigbe	18	2	13+4	2	0+0	0	0+0	0	0+0	0	1+0	0
35	MF	(England) ENG	Mike Jones	5	0	0+2	0	0+0	0	0+0	0	3+0	0	0+0	0
37	GK	(Australia) AUS	Ashton Rinaldo	1	0	0+0	0	0+0	0	0+0	0	1+0	0	0+0	0
38	DF	(Gibraltar) GIB	Liam Jessop	4	0	1+1	0	0+1	0	0+0	0	1+0	0	0+0	0
39	MF	(England) ENG	Ali Mohiuddin	2	0	0+0	0	0+0	0	0+0	0	1+1	0	0+0	0
40	MF	(England) ENG	Connor Cook	6	1	0+2	0	0+0	0	0+0	0	1+3	1	0+0	0
41	FW	(Malta) MLT	Gunner Elliott	1	0	0+1	0	0+0	0	0+0	0	0+0	0	0+0	0
44	DF	(Saint Lucia) LCA	Janoi Donacien	8	0	4+3	0	0+0	0	0+0	0	0+1	0	0+0	0
Player(s) who featured whilst on loan but returned to parent club permanently during the season:
24	FW	(England) ENG	Dilan Markanday	24	7	22+0	6	0+0	0	0+0	0	0+2	1	0+0	0
30	DF	(Colombia) COL	Devan Tanton	11	0	8+0	0	1+0	0	1+0	0	0+1	0	0+0	0
Player(s) who featured but departed the club permanently during the season:
3	DF	(England) ENG	Branden Horton	12	0	2+5	0	1+0	0	0+0	0	4+0	0	0+0	0
16	MF	(Nigeria) NGR	Tim Akinola	5	0	0+2	0	0+0	0	0+1	0	1+1	0	0+0	0
18	FW	(England) ENG	James Berry	28	10	11+11	7	2+0	0	1+0	0	2+1	3	0+0	0
27	FW	(Republic of Ireland) IRL	Joe Quigley	5	0	0+3	0	0+0	0	1+0	0	1+0	0	0+0	0
