= Harvey Araujo =

English footballer (born 2004)

Personal information
- Full name: Harvey Araujo
- Date of birth: 7 November 2004 (age 22)
- Height: 1.80 m (5 ft 11 in)
- Position: Defender

Team information
- Current team: Burton Albion
- Number: 24

Youth career
- 2016–2024: Fulham

Senior career*
Years	Team	Apps	(Gls)
2024–2026	Fulham	0	(0)
2024–2025	→ Chesterfield (loan)	20	(0)
2025–2026	→ Colchester United (loan)	28	(0)
2026–	Burton Albion	11	(0)

International career
- England U18
- * Club domestic league appearances and goals as of 11:26, 22 November 2026 (UTC)

Harvey Araujo (born 7 November 2004) is an English professional footballer who plays as a defender for EFL League One club Burton Albion.

== Club career ==
Araujo began his career with Fulham at the age of 11, turning professional in September 2021. In July 2024 he signed a new three-year contract with the club, and in August 2024 he moved on loan to Chesterfield. In October 2024 he commented that it was important for his teammates to stay motivated, despite having drawn a number of games.

In August 2025 he signed on loan for Colchester United.

On 19 August 2026, Araujo signed for League One club Burton Albion for an undisclosed fee on a three-year-deal.

== International career ==
Araujo has played for England at under-18 level, earning his first call-up in October 2021.

== Personal life ==
Araujo has an English father and a Rwandan mother.

== Career statistics ==
As of match played on 21 November 2026

Appearances and goals by club, season and competition
Club	Season	League			FA Cup		EFL Cup		Other		Total	
Club	Season	Division	Apps	Goals	Apps	Goals	Apps	Goals	Apps	Goals	Apps	Goals
Fulham	2024–25	Premier League	0	0	0	0	0	0	0	0	0	0
Fulham	2025–26	Premier League	0	0	0	0	0	0	0	0	0	0
Fulham	Total		0	0	0	0	0	0	0	0	0	0
Chesterfield (loan)	2024–25	League Two	20	0	1	0	0	0	2 (Note: Appearance(s) in the EFL Trophy)	0	23	0
Colchester United (loan)	2025–26	League Two	28	0	1	0	0	0	2	0	31	0
Burton Albion	2026–27	League One	11	0	1	0	0	0	2	0	14	0
Career total			59	0	3	0	0	0	6	0	68	0
