= Lewis Gordon (footballer) =

English-born Scottish footballer

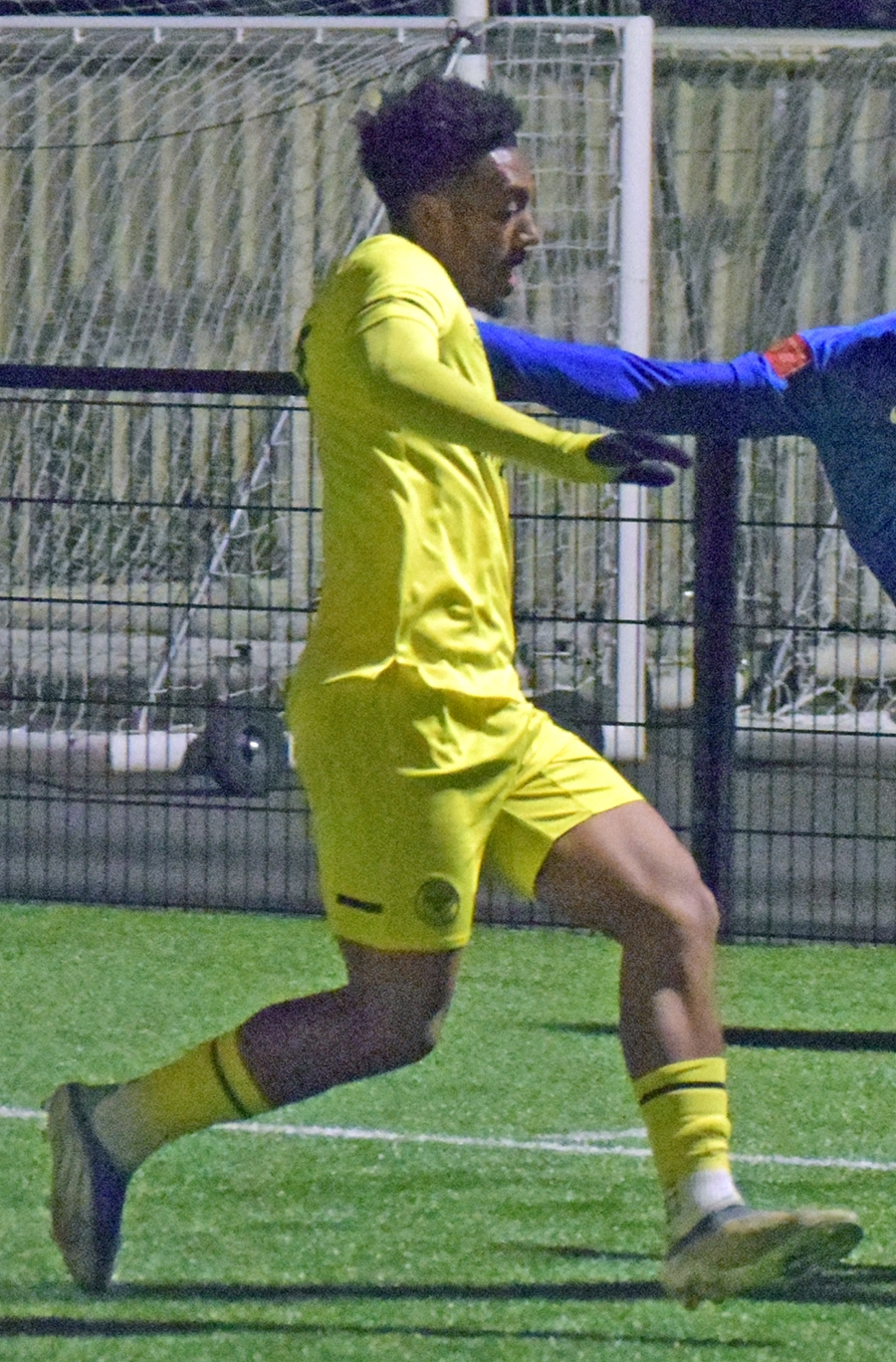
- Gordon playing for Brentford B in April 2022.

Personal information
- Full name: Lewis Courtney Gordon
- Date of birth: 12 February 2001 (age 25)
- Place of birth: London, England
- Height: 1.76 m (5 ft 9 in)
- Position: Left back

Team information
- Current team: Chesterfield
- Number: 19

Youth career
- 2009–2020: Watford

Senior career*
Years	Team	Apps	(Gls)
2020	Watford	0	(0)
2020	→ St Albans City (loan)	7	(0)
2020–2022	Brentford	0	(0)
2022–2024	Bristol Rovers	61	(0)
2024–	Chesterfield	66	(0)

International career
2018	Scotland U17	2	(0)
2019	Scotland U19	1	(0)
- * Club domestic league appearances and goals as of 14:10, 10 September 2026 (UTC)

Lewis Courtney Gordon (born 12 February 2001) is a professional footballer who plays as a left back for EFL League Two club Chesterfield.

Gordon is a product of the Watford academy and he began his professional career with the club. Following two seasons with Brentford B, Gordon's professional career began in earnest with Bristol Rovers in 2022. He was capped by Scotland at youth level.

== Club career ==
=== Youth years ===
A left back, Gordon joined the Watford academy at U7 level and progressed to sign his first professional contract on 6 March 2018. Gordon was named the club's 2017–18 Academy Player of the Year and progressed to the U23 team, but after a spell on loan with National League South club St Albans City, he was released in June 2020.

=== Brentford ===
On 4 September 2020, Gordon joined the B team at Championship club Brentford and signed a one-year contract, with the option of a further year, on a free transfer. He made his first team debut with a start in a 2–1 FA Cup third round victory over Middlesbrough on 9 January 2021. Gordon was an unused substitute during four late-regular season matches, but was not involved during Brentford's successful playoff campaign. Gordon made 32 appearances and scored one goal during the 2020–21 B team season and the one-year option on his contract was taken up in June 2021. Gordon spent the majority of the 2021–22 pre-season with the first team squad, but did not win a call-up during the regular season. Following more than 70 B team appearances over two seasons, Gordon was released when his contract expired at the end of the 2021–22 season.

=== Bristol Rovers ===
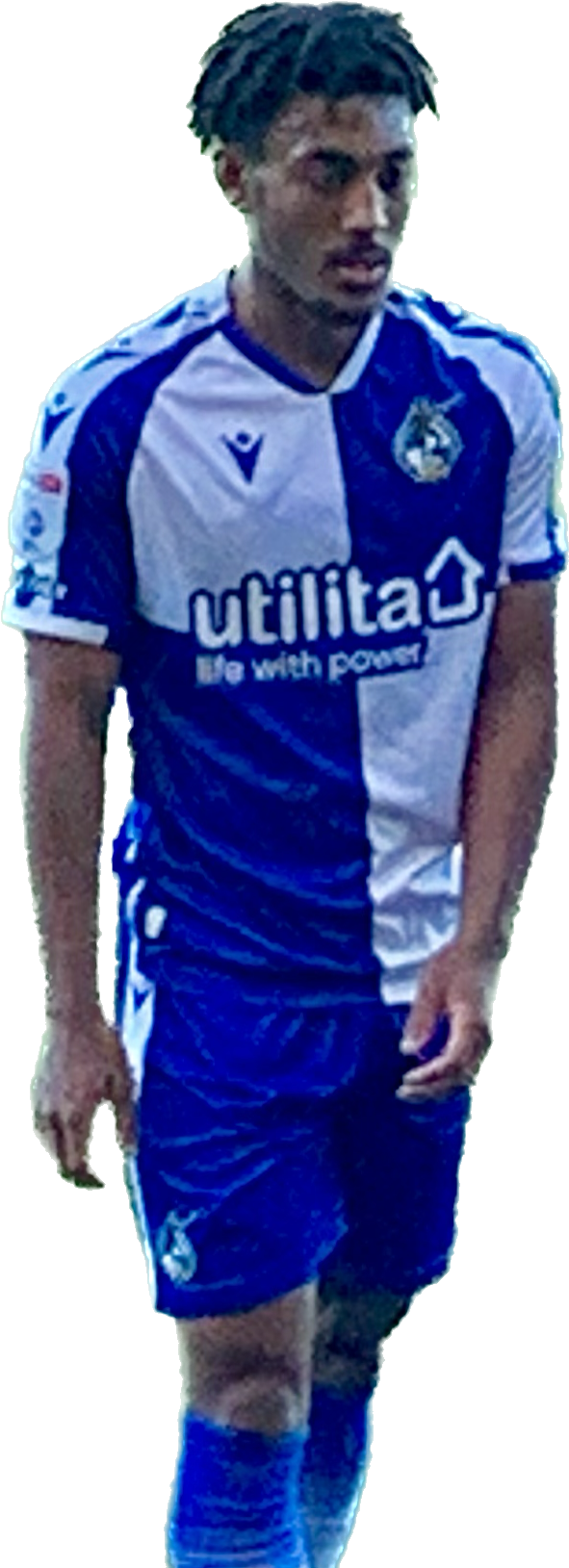
Gordon playing for Bristol Rovers in 2022

Following a trial period with Crystal Palace U23, Gordon signed a two-year contract with League One club Bristol Rovers on 6 August 2022. He made 73 appearances during two mid-table seasons and won praise from manager Joey Barton for his progress made during the 2022–23 season. Gordon was released at the end of the 2023–24 season, when his contract expired.

=== Chesterfield ===
On 31 May 2024, it was announced that Gordon had joined League Two club Chesterfield on a free transfer. He signed a one-year contract, with the option of a further year, effective 1 July 2024. Gordon made 38 appearances during a 2024–25 season which culminated in defeat in the playoff semi-finals. The club exercised its option on his contract during the early off-season and he signed a new two-year contract in July 2025. Either side of three mid-season months out with "quite a big tear in his quad", Gordon made 36 appearances during the 2025–26 season, which again ended in a playoff semi-final defeat.

== International career ==
Of Scottish descent through his grandmother, Gordon was capped by Scotland at U17 and U19 level. He was a part of the Scotland squad which was unsuccessful in qualifying for the 2018 UEFA European U17 Championship.

== Career statistics ==
As of match played 5 September 2026

Appearances and goals by club, season and competition
Club	Season	League			FA Cup		EFL Cup		Other		Total	
Club	Season	Division	Apps	Goals	Apps	Goals	Apps	Goals	Apps	Goals	Apps	Goals
Watford	2019–20	Premier League	0	0	0	0	0	0	—		0	0
St Albans City (loan)	2019–20	National League South	7	0	—		—		2 (Note: Appearances in Herts Senior Cup)	0	9	0
Brentford	2020–21	Championship	0	0	1	0	0	0	0	0	1	0
Bristol Rovers	2022–23	League One	39	0	2	0	1	0	3 (Note: Appearances in EFL Trophy)	0	45	0
Bristol Rovers	2023–24	League One	22	0	1	0	1	0	4	0	28	0
Bristol Rovers	Total		61	0	3	0	2	0	7	0	73	0
Chesterfield	2024–25	League Two	33	0	2	0	1	0	2 (Note: 1 appearance in League Two play-offs, 1 appearance in EFL Trophy)	0	38	0
Chesterfield	2025–26	League Two	28	0	2	0	1	0	5 (Note: 3 appearances in EFL Trophy, 2 appearances in League Two play-offs)	0	36	0
Chesterfield	2026–27	League Two	5	0	0	0	1	0	0	0	6	0
Chesterfield	Total		66	0	4	0	3	0	7	0	80	0
Career total			134	0	8	0	5	0	16	0	163	0

== Honours ==
Brentford B

- London Senior Cup: 2021–22

Individual

- Watford Academy Player of the Year: 2017–18
