= Tim Akinola =

Nigerian footballer (born 2001)

Personal information
- Full name: Timothy Olaoluwa Akinola
- Date of birth: 8 May 2001 (age 25)
- Place of birth: Lokoja, Nigeria
- Height: 1.77 m (5 ft 10 in)
- Position: Midfielder

Team information
- Current team: Woking
- Number: 23

Youth career
- –2018: Lincoln City

Senior career*
Years	Team	Apps	(Gls)
2018–2019	Lincoln City	0	(0)
2019–2020	Huddersfield Town	0	(0)
2020–2023	Arsenal	0	(0)
2022	→ Dundee United (loan)	1	(0)
2022–2023	→ Chesterfield (loan)	26	(0)
2023–2024	Al Bidda	7	(0)
2024–2025	Chesterfield	2	(0)
2024	→ Dagenham & Redridge (loan)	5	(0)
2025	→ Solihull Moors (loan)	2	(0)
2025	Gateshead	6	(1)
2025–	Woking	53	(2)
- * Club domestic league appearances and goals as of 20:11, 22 November 2026 (UTC)

Timothy Olaoluwa Akinola (born 8 May 2001) is a Nigerian professional footballer who plays as a midfielder for National League club Woking.

== Career ==
Akinola was born in Lokoja, Nigeria. He played youth football with Lincoln City and Huddersfield Town, before signing for Arsenal in summer 2020. After playing for Arsenal under-23s, he moved on loan to Scottish club Dundee United in January 2022. Akinola initially believed he had signed for the club's city rivals Dundee.

After one 45-minute appearance for Dundee United which saw him substituted at half-time, Akinola returned to Arsenal in March 2022 due to injury. He later underwent surgery. In August 2022, he joined Chesterfield in the National League on a season-long loan, making his debut as a substitute against Oldham Athletic.

He permanently switch to Qatari side Al Bidda in September 2023.

=== Return to Chesterfield ===
On 16 May 2024, it was confirmed he would return to Chesterfield on a one-year deal with an option.

On 29 August 2024, he signed for National League side Dagenham & Redbridge on a season-long loan becoming the club's fifteenth signing of the summer. In February 2025, he joined National League club Solihull Moors on an initial one-month loan.

=== Gateshead ===
On 28 March 2025, Akinola joined National League side Gateshead on a deal until the end of the 2025–26 season.

=== Woking ===
On 26 July 2025, Akinola joined Woking on a one-year deal.

== Career statistics ==
As of match played 21 November 2026

Appearances and goals by club, season and competition
Club	Season	League			National Cup (Note: Includes FA Cup)		League Cup (Note: Includes EFL Cup)		Other		Total	
Club	Season	Division	Apps	Goals	Apps	Goals	Apps	Goals	Apps	Goals	Apps	Goals
Lincoln City	2018–19	League Two	0	0	0	0	0	0	0	0	0	0
Arsenal U21	2020–21	—	—		—		—		4 (Note: Appearance(s) in EFL Trophy)	0	4	0
Arsenal U21	2021–22	—	—		—		—		3	0	3	0
Arsenal U21	2022–23	—	—		—		—		1	0	1	0
Arsenal U21	Total		—		—		—		8	0	8	0
Dundee United (loan)	2021–22	Scottish Premiership	1	0	0	0	—		—		1	0
Chesterfield (loan)	2022–23	National League	26	0	4	0	—		1 (Note: Appearance in National League play-offs)	0	31	0
Al Bidda	2023–24	Qatari Second Division	7	0	0	0	—		—		7	0
Chesterfield	2024–25	League Two	2	0	0	0	1	0	2	0	5	0
Dagenham & Redbridge (loan)	2024–25	National League	5	0	0	0	—		0	0	5	0
Solihull Moors (loan)	2024–25	National League	2	0	0	0	—		0	0	2	0
Gateshead	2024–25	National League	6	0	0	0	—		0	0	6	0
Woking	2025–26	National League	38	1	2	0	—		7 (Note: Four Appearances in National League Cup, three appearances in FA Trophy)	0	47	1
Woking	2026–27	National League	15	1	1	0	—		3 (Note: Three appearances in National League Cup)	0	19	1
Woking	Total		53	2	3	0	—		10	0	66	2
Career total			102	2	7	0	1	0	21	0	131	2
