= Vontae Daley-Campbell =

English footballer (born 2001)

Personal information
- Full name: Vontae Jason Daley-Campbell
- Date of birth: 2 April 2001 (age 25)
- Place of birth: Clapham, England
- Height: 6 ft 0 in (1.83 m)
- Position: Right-back

Team information
- Current team: Southend United
- Number: 2

Youth career
- –2019: Arsenal
- 2019–2021: Leicester City

Senior career*
Years	Team	Apps	(Gls)
2021–2022	Leicester City	0	(0)
2022	→ Dundee (loan)	9	(0)
2022–2024	Cardiff City	1	(0)
2024	Peterborough United	0	(0)
2024–2026	Chesterfield	36	(0)
2026–	Southend United	8	(0)

International career^{‡}
2016	England U16	1	(0)
2017–2018	England U17	9	(0)
2018–2019	England U18	12	(0)
2019	England U19	2	(0)
- * Club domestic league appearances and goals as of 24 September 2026 (UTC) ‡ National team caps and goals as of 12:44, 19 February 2021 (UTC)

Vontae Jason Daley-Campbell (born 2 April 2001) is an English professional footballer who plays as a right-back for National League club Southend United.

== Club career ==
=== Leicester City ===
Daley-Campbell joined Leicester after being released by Arsenal in 2019. He made his professional debut on 10 February 2021, playing the entirety of a 1–0 win against Brighton in the FA Cup fifth round.

==== Dundee (loan) ====
On 31 January 2022, Daley-Campbell signed for Scottish Premiership side Dundee on loan until the end of the season. He would make his debut the next day, starting in the Dundee derby. Daley-Campbell would return to his parent club at the end of the season in May 2022.

=== Cardiff City ===
On 15 June 2022, Daley-Campbell agreed to join Championship side Cardiff City on a three-year deal, active from 1 July when his Leicester City contract expires.

His Cardiff City contract was terminated by mutual consent on the first of February 2024. He made only one appearance for the bluebirds.

=== Peterborough United ===
On 14 February 2024, Daley-Campbell joined League One club Peterborough United on a short-term contract until the end of the season. On 12 May 2024, the club announced he would be released in the summer when his contract expired.

=== Chesterfield ===
On 1 August 2024, Daley-Campbell joined League Two club Chesterfield on a one-year deal with the option for a further twelve months. On 22 May 2026, Chesterfield announced the player was being released.

== International career ==
Daley-Campbell was a member of the England under-17 team that hosted the 2018 UEFA European Under-17 Championship.

== Career statistics ==
=== Club ===
As of match played 25 October 2025

Appearances and goals by club, season and competition
Club	Season	League			National cup (Note: Includes FA Cup and Scottish Cup)		League cup (Note: Includes EFL Cup and Scottish League Cup)		Continental		Other		Total	
Club	Season	Division	Apps	Goals	Apps	Goals	Apps	Goals	Apps	Goals	Apps	Goals	Apps	Goals
Leicester City U21	2019–20	—			—		—		—		2 (Note: Appearance(s) in EFL Trophy)	0	2	0
Leicester City U21	2020–21	—			—		—		—		4	0	4	0
Leicester City U21	2021–22	—			—		—		—		2	0	2	0
Leicester City U21	Total		—		—		—		—		8	0	8	0
Leicester City	2020–21	Premier League	0	0	1	0	0	0	0	0	—		1	0
Leicester City	2021–22	Premier League	0	0	1	0	1	0	0	0	0	0	2	0
Leicester City	Total		0	0	2	0	1	0	0	0	0	0	3	0
Dundee (loan)	2021–22	Scottish Premiership	9	0	1	0	—		—		—		10	0
Cardiff City	2022–23	Championship	1	0	0	0	1	0	—		—		2	0
Cardiff City	2023–24	Championship	0	0	0	0	0	0	—		—		0	0
Cardiff City	Total		1	0	0	0	1	0	—		—		2	0
Peterborough United	2023–24	League One	0	0	—		—		—		0	0	0	0
Chesterfield	2024–25	League Two	9	0	0	0	1	0	—		2	0	12	0
Chesterfield	2025–26	League Two	12	0	0	0	1	0	—		1	0	14	0
Chesterfield	Total		21	0	0	0	2	0	—		3	0	26	0
Career total			31	0	3	0	4	0	0	0	11	0	49	0

== Honours ==
Leicester City

- FA Cup: 2020–21
