= Ryheem Sheckleford =

English footballer

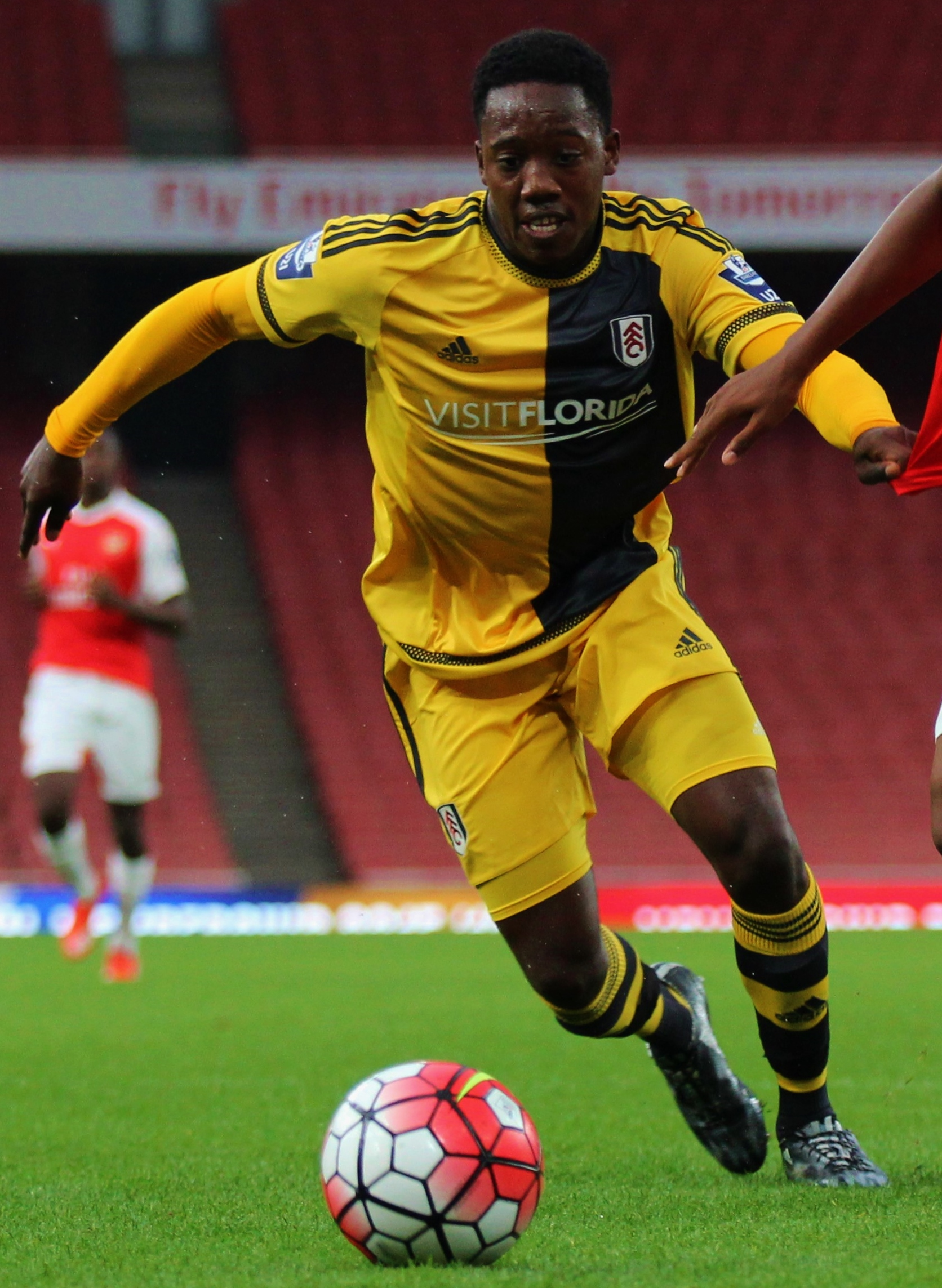
- Ryheem Sheckleford playing for Fulham U21 in 2015.

Personal information
- Full name: Ryheem Leonard Cole Sheckleford
- Date of birth: 20 May 1997 (age 29)
- Place of birth: Lewisham, England
- Height: 5 ft 9 in (1.75 m)
- Position: Full-back

Team information
- Current team: Aldershot Town
- Number: 31

Youth career
- 2011–2015: Fulham

Senior career*
Years	Team	Apps	(Gls)
2015–2017	Fulham	0	(0)
2016–2017	→ Wealdstone (loan)	7	(0)
2018–2022	Maidenhead United	85	(0)
2018–2019	→ Walton Casuals (loan)	31	(1)
2019	→ Walton Casuals (loan)	2	(0)
2022–2025	Chesterfield	45	(0)
2025–	Aldershot Town	0	(0)
- * Club domestic league appearances and goals as of 20:09, 13 November 2025 (UTC)

Ryheem Leonard Cole Sheckleford (born 20 May 1997) is an English professional footballer who plays as a full-back for National League club Aldershot Town.

== Career ==
=== Fulham ===
Sheckleford joined the academy at Fulham in 2011. He progressed quickly through the academy, making his debut for the under-18s as a 15-year-old. He was part of the team that reached the FA Youth Cup final in 2014, and went on to captain the under-18 side. In October 2014, he signed his first professional contract on a two-year deal. This was extended for another year in summer 2016. In November 2016, he joined Wealdstone on loan, where he played 13 times in all competitions. Fulham released Sheckleford at the end of the 2016-17 season.

=== Maidenhead United ===
Sheckleford was without a club in the 2017-18 season, though he did play on trial at Bolton Wanderers in April 2018. He signed for Maidenhead United in August 2018, but spent most of the season out on loan at Walton Casuals. After a brief return on loan to Casuals at the start of the following season, Sheckleford returned to the Magpies and established himself as first-choice right-back, holding down his spot in the side for the next three seasons. He left the Magpies in June 2022 after turning down a new deal. In total, he played 93 games for the Berkshire club.

=== Chesterfield ===
Sheckleford signed for Chesterfield on a two-year deal in June 2022. He went on to make 53 appearances for the Spireites.

=== Aldershot Town ===
On 13 November 2025, Sheckleford returned to the National League, joining Aldershot Town.

== Career statistics ==
As of 8 November 2025

Club	Season	League			FA Cup		League Cup		Other		Total	
Club	Season	Division	Apps	Goals	Apps	Goals	Apps	Goals	Apps	Goals	Apps	Goals
Wealdstone (loan)	2016–17	National League South	7	0	0	0	—		6 (Note: Appearance(s) in FA Trophy.)	0	13	0
Maidenhead United	2018–19	National League	3	0	0	0	—		0	0	3	0
Maidenhead United	2019–20	National League	27	0	3	0	—		3	0	33	0
Maidenhead United	2020–21	National League	28	0	1	0	—		1	0	30	0
Maidenhead United	2021–22	National League	27	0	0	0	—		0	0	27	0
Maidenhead United	Total		85	0	4	0	—		4	0	93	0
Walton Casuals (loan)	2018–19	SFL Premier Division South	31	1	3	0	—		10	0	44	1
Walton Casuals (loan)	2019–20	SFL Premier Division South	2	0	0	0	—		0	0	2	0
Chesterfield	2022–23	National League	11	0	1	0	—		0	0	12	0
Chesterfield	2023–24	National League	17	0	3	0	—		0	0	20	0
Chesterfield	2024–25	League Two	17	0	1	0	—		1 (Note: Appearances in EFL Trophy)	0	19	0
Chesterfield	2025–26	League Two	0	0	0	0	—		2	0	2	0
Chesterfield	Total		45	0	5	0	—		3	0	53	0
Career total			170	1	12	0	0	0	23	0	205	1

== Honours ==
Chesterfield

- National League: 2023–24
