= Bailey Hobson =

English footballer (born 2000)

Personal information
- Full name: Bailey Lee Hobson
- Date of birth: 1 August 2002 (age 24)
- Place of birth: Sheffield, England
- Position: Midfielder

Team information
- Current team: Harrogate Town
- Number: 15

Youth career
- Sheffield United

Senior career*
Years	Team	Apps	(Gls)
- High Noon
2019–2020	Handsworth	22	(5)
2020	Maltby Main	2	(2)
2021–2023	Alfreton Town	86	(18)
2023–2026	Chesterfield	21	(1)
2023–2024	→ Kidderminster Harriers (loan)	17	(2)
2024	→ Barnet (loan)	13	(2)
2025	→ Brackley Town (loan)	14	(0)
2026–	Harrogate Town	0	(0)
- * Club domestic league appearances and goals as of 16:44, 1 July 2026 (UTC)

Bailey Lee Hobson (born 1 August 2002) is an English professional footballer who plays as a midfielder for National League club Harrogate Town.

== Career ==
Hobson played for Sheffield United as a youngster. He had spells with non-league sides High Noon, Handsworth and Maltby Main before joining Alfreton Town in 2021.

=== Chesterfield ===
Despite being offered a new deal by Alfreton at the end of the 2022–23 season, Hobson joined National League club Chesterfield on a two-year deal.

On 22 September 2023, it was announced that Hobson had signed for fellow National League side Kidderminster Harriers on loan. He was recalled from his loan in January 2024, having scored twice in 17 appearances. He made a further 10 National League appearances, scoring once, for Chesterfield that season as they were promoted to EFL League Two as National League champions.

On 13 September 2024, Hobson joined Barnet on a one-month loan. The following month, his loan was extended until January 2025.

He departed Chesterfield upon the expiry of his contract at the end of the 2025–26 season.

=== Harrogate Town ===
On 22 May 2026, Hobson agreed to join National League side Harrogate Town following their relegation.

== Career statistics ==
As of end of 2025–26 season

Appearances and goals by club, season and competition
Club	Season	League			FA Cup		EFL Cup		Other		Total	
Club	Season	Division	Apps	Goals	Apps	Goals	Apps	Goals	Apps	Goals	Apps	Goals
Handsworth	2019–20	NCEL Premier Division	12	2	0	0	—		0	0	12	2
Handsworth	2020–21	NCEL Premier Division	10	3	0	0	—		0	0	10	3
Maltby Main	2020–21	NCEL Premier Division	2	2	0	0	—		0	0	2	2
Alfreton Town	2021–22	National League North	40	11	1	0	—		3 (Note: Appearances in FA Trophy)	4	44	15
Alfreton Town	2022–23	National League North	46	7	1	0	—		1 (Note: Appearance in National League North playoffs)	0	48	7
Alfreton Town	Total		86	18	2	0	0	0	4	4	92	22
Chesterfield	2023–24	National League	10	1	0	0	—		0	0	10	1
Chesterfield	2024–25	EFL League Two	11	0	0	0	1	0	4 (Note: Appearances in EFL Trophy)	0	16	0
Chesterfield	2025–26	League Two	0	0	0	0	0	0	1	0	1	0
Chesterfield	Total		21	1	0	0	1	0	5	0	27	1
Kidderminster Harriers (loan)	2023–24	National League	17	2	1	1	—		1	0	19	3
Barnet (loan)	2024–25	National League	13	2	2	0	—		0	0	15	2
Brackley Town (loan)	2025–26	National League	14	0	2	0	—		0	0	16	0
Career total			166	30	7	1	1	0	8	4	182	35

== Honours ==
Chesterfield

- National League: 2023–24

Barnet

- National League: 2024–25
