= Tyrone Williams (footballer, born 1994) =

English footballer (born 1994)

Personal information
- Full name: Tyrone Williams
- Date of birth: 21 October 1994 (age 32)
- Place of birth: Birmingham, England
- Height: 1.88 m (6 ft 2 in)
- Position: Defender

Youth career
- Kidderminster Harriers

Senior career*
Years	Team	Apps	(Gls)
2013–2018	Kidderminster Harriers	71	(3)
2013	→ Sutton Coldfield Town (loan)		
2013	→ Chasetown (loan)		
2013–2014	→ Redditch United (loan)		
2014	→ Romulus (loan)		
2015	→ Stourbridge (loan)		
2015–2016	→ Hednesford Town (loan)	22	(3)
2018–2021	Solihull Moors	118	(5)
2021–2026	Chesterfield	79	(5)
Total		290+	(16+)
- * Club domestic league appearances and goals as of 11:24, 13 March 2026 (UTC)

Tyrone Williams (born 21 October 1994) is an English former professional footballer who played as a defender.

== Career ==
Williams turned professional at Kidderminster Harriers in 2013, becoming the first graduate of the club's Academy. He signed a new one-year contract in June 2017 and said that "there have been many ups and downs since I’ve been here but we’re on the rise now and that’s the main thing". On 27 July 2015, he joined Hednesford Town on loan until 2 January 2016. Upon his return to Kidderminster, Hednesford manager Frank Sinclair said that "we are disappointed to lose Tyrone Williams back to Kidderminster and it shows what they must think of him to recall him".

On 16 January 2018, Williams joined Solihull Moors for an undisclosed transfer fee. He won the club's Player of the Season and Players’ Player of the Season awards for 2020–21.

On 12 March 2026, Williams announced his retirement from football.

== Style of play ==
Williams is a powerful defender who can play as a centre-back or right-back.

== Career statistics ==
As of end of 2024–25 season

Appearances and goals by club, season and competition
Club	Season	League			FA Cup		EFL Cup		Other		Total	
Club	Season	Division	Apps	Goals	Apps	Goals	Apps	Goals	Apps	Goals	Apps	Goals
Kidderminster Harriers	2013–14	Conference Premier	0	0	0	0	—		0	0	0	0
Kidderminster Harriers	2014–15	Conference Premier	0	0	0	0	—		0	0	0	0
Kidderminster Harriers	2015–16	National League	18	1	0	0	—		0	0	18	1
Kidderminster Harriers	2016–17	National League North	34	2	2	0	—		3 (Note: Appearance(s) in the FA Trophy)	1	34	2
Kidderminster Harriers	2017–18	National League North	19	0	1	0	—		1	0	19	0
Kidderminster Harriers	Total		71	3	3	0	0	0	4	1	78	4
Hednesford Town (loan)	2015–16	National League North	22	3	0	0	—		0	0	22	3
Solihull Moors	2017–18	National League	14	1	0	0	—		0	0	14	1
Solihull Moors	2018–19	National League	39	2	4	0	—		5	0	39	2
Solihull Moors	2019–20	National League	17	0	0	0	—		4 (Note: 2 appearances in the FA Trophy, 2 appearances in the Scottish Challenge Cup)	0	17	0
Solihull Moors	2020–21	National League	37	2	3	0	—		2	0	37	2
Solihull Moors	2021–22	National League	11	0	2	0	—		0	0	11	0
Solihull Moors	Total		118	5	9	0	0	0	11	0	138	5
Chesterfield	2021–22	National League	22	0	0	0	—		0	0	22	0
Chesterfield	2022–23	National League	25	3	4	1	—		0	0	25	3
Chesterfield	2023–24	National League	22	2	0	0	—		0	0	22	2
Chesterfield	2024–25	EFL League Two	10	0	1	0	0	0	3 (Note: Appearance(s) in the EFL Trophy)	0	14	0
Chesterfield	Total		79	5	5	1	0	0	3	0	87	6
Career total			290	16	17	1	0	0	18	1	325	18

== Honours ==
Individual

- Solihull Moors Player of the Season: 2020–21

Chesterfield

- National League: 2023–24
