= James Berry (footballer) =

English footballer (born 2000)

Personal information
- Full name: James Jon Berry-McNally
- Date of birth: 10 December 2000 (age 25)
- Place of birth: Wigan, England
- Height: 1.83 m (6 ft 0 in)
- Position: Forward

Team information
- Current team: Forest Green Rovers
- Number: 17

Youth career
- Liverpool
- 2016–2019: Wigan Athletic
- 2019–2020: Hull City

Senior career*
Years	Team	Apps	(Gls)
2020–2021	Hull City	1	(0)
2021–2022	Altrincham	0	(0)
2021–2022	→ Macclesfield (loan)	30	(11)
2022–2023	Macclesfield	37	(31)
2023–2025	Chesterfield	56	(13)
2025–	Wycombe Wanderers	3	(0)
2025–2026	→ Chesterfield (loan)	33	(5)
2026–	→ Forest Green Rovers (loan)	4	(0)
- * Club domestic league appearances and goals as of 17:48, 25 October 2026 (UTC)

James Jon Berry-McNally (born 10 December 2000) is an English professional footballer who plays as a forward for Forest Green Rovers on loan from EFL League One club Wycombe Wanderers.

== Career ==
=== Early career ===
Born in Wigan, Berry signed scholarship forms with his hometown club Wigan Athletic in December 2016 after being released by Liverpool. In November 2017, he was an unused substitute in a 4–0 defeat against Accrington Stanley in the EFL Trophy, but made no first team appearances for the club.

=== Hull City ===
In November 2019, Berry joined Hull City after the club agreed a compensation deal with Wigan. On 11 February 2020, he made his senior debut as a substitute in a 3–0 defeat against Blackburn Rovers.

=== Non-league ===
After his release from Hull, he joined Macclesfield on loan after signing for Altrincham. He signed a two-year contract to make his move to Macclesfield permanent in March 2022, becoming the club's record signing. He scored 18 goals in his 34 appearances during the 2021-22 season, including a brace in a 4–0 win against Ashton Athletic which secured the North West Counties Premier Division title on 12 March 2022. Berry's second season with the Silkmen was even more prolific as, despite being injured from February to April, his 24 league goals won him the NPL West Division Golden Boot. Berry's performances contributed to Macclesfield winning the league title and consecutive promotions. His final competitive match for the club was a 3–1 win against Mossley in which he scored.

=== Chesterfield ===
On 10 August 2023, Berry joined National League club Chesterfield on a three-year deal for an undisclosed fee. Despite featuring mainly as a substitute, his six league goals contributed to the club securing the National League title and promotion to League Two, completing a personal hat-trick of league titles and promotions for Berry. On 17 August 2024, Berry netted a first EFL brace away at Crewe Alexandra, followed by another eight goals in all competitions during the first half of the season, leading to interest from higher up the football pyramid.

=== Wycombe Wanderers ===
On 22 January 2025, Berry signed for League One club Wycombe Wanderers for an undisclosed fee. Berry made his debut as a 72nd minute substitute in a 1–0 loss against promotion rivals Wrexham and went on to make three appearances for the club during the second half of the season. On 8 August 2025, Berry returned to Chesterfield on a season-long loan deal.

== Career statistics ==
As of match played 18 January 2025

Appearances and goals by club, season and competition
Club	Season	League			FA Cup		League Cup		Other		Total	
Club	Season	Division	Apps	Goals	Apps	Goals	Apps	Goals	Apps	Goals	Apps	Goals
Hull City	2019–20	Championship	1	0	0	0	0	0	—		1	0
Hull City	2020–21	League One	0	0	0	0	0	0	1 (Note: Appearance in EFL Trophy)	0	1	0
Hull City	Total		1	0	0	0	0	0	1	0	2	0
Altrincham	2021–22	National League	0	0	0	0	—		—		0	0
Macclesfield (loan)	2021–22	North West Counties Premier Division	30	11	0	0	0	0	—		30	11
Macclesfield	2021-22 (Note: Loan from Altrincham was made permanent on 10 March 2022)	North West Counties Premier Division	5	7	0	0	3 (Note: Appearances in North West Counties League Challenge Cup)	4	—		8	11
Macclesfield	2022–23	Northern Premier League Division One West	32	24	4	1	—		5 (Note: Four appearances and three goals in the FA Trophy, one appearance and three goals in the Cheshire Senior Cup)	6	41	31
Macclesfield	Total		67	42	4	1	3	4	5	6	79	53
Chesterfield	2023–24	National League	34	6	2	0	—		1 (Note: Appearance and goal in the FA Trophy)	1	37	7
Chesterfield	2024–25	League Two	22	7	2	0	1	0	3	3	28	10
Chesterfield	Total		56	13	4	0	1	0	4	4	65	17
Wycombe Wanderers	2024–25	League One	0	0	0	0	0	0	0	0	0	0
Career total			124	55	8	1	4	4	10	10	146	70

== Honours ==
Macclesfield

- Northern Premier League Division One West: 2022–23
- North West Counties Football League: 2021–22

Chesterfield

- National League: 2023–24
