= Ali Mohiuddin =

English footballer (born 2005)

Personal information
- Full name: Ali Hammad Aftab Mohiuddin
- Date of birth: 24 April 2005 (age 21)
- Position: Midfielder

Youth career
- Chesterfield

Senior career*
Years	Team	Apps	(Gls)
2024–2025	Chesterfield	0	(0)
2025-?	Mickleover	?	(?)
- * Club domestic league appearances and goals as of 17:50, 24 August 2025 (UTC)

Ali Hammad Aftab Mohiuddin (born 24 April 2005) is an English professional footballer who plays as a midfielder for Northern Premier League Division One Midlands side Mickleover.

== Career ==
Mohiuddin turned professional at Chesterfield in the summer of 2024. He made his first senior start on 3 September 2024, in a 1–0 win at Lincoln City in the EFL Trophy. He was released at the end of the 2024–25 season. At the start of the 2025/26 season, fellow Derbyshire side Mickleover signed Ali on a free transfer.

== Personal life ==
He is of Moroccan descent.

== Career statistics ==
As of match played 3 September 2024

Appearances and goals by club, season and competition
Club	Season	League			FA Cup		EFL Cup		Other		Total	
Club	Season	Division	Apps	Goals	Apps	Goals	Apps	Goals	Apps	Goals	Apps	Goals
Chesterfield	2023–24	National League	0	0	0	0	—		2 (Note: Appearance in FA Trophy)	1	2	1
Chesterfield	2024–25	EFL League Two	0	0	0	0	0	0	2 (Note: Appearance in EFL Trophy)	0	2	0
Chesterfield	Total		0	0	0	0	0	0	4	1	4	1
Career total			0	0	0	0	0	0	4	1	4	1
