= Armando Dobra =

English-born Albanian footballer (born 2001)

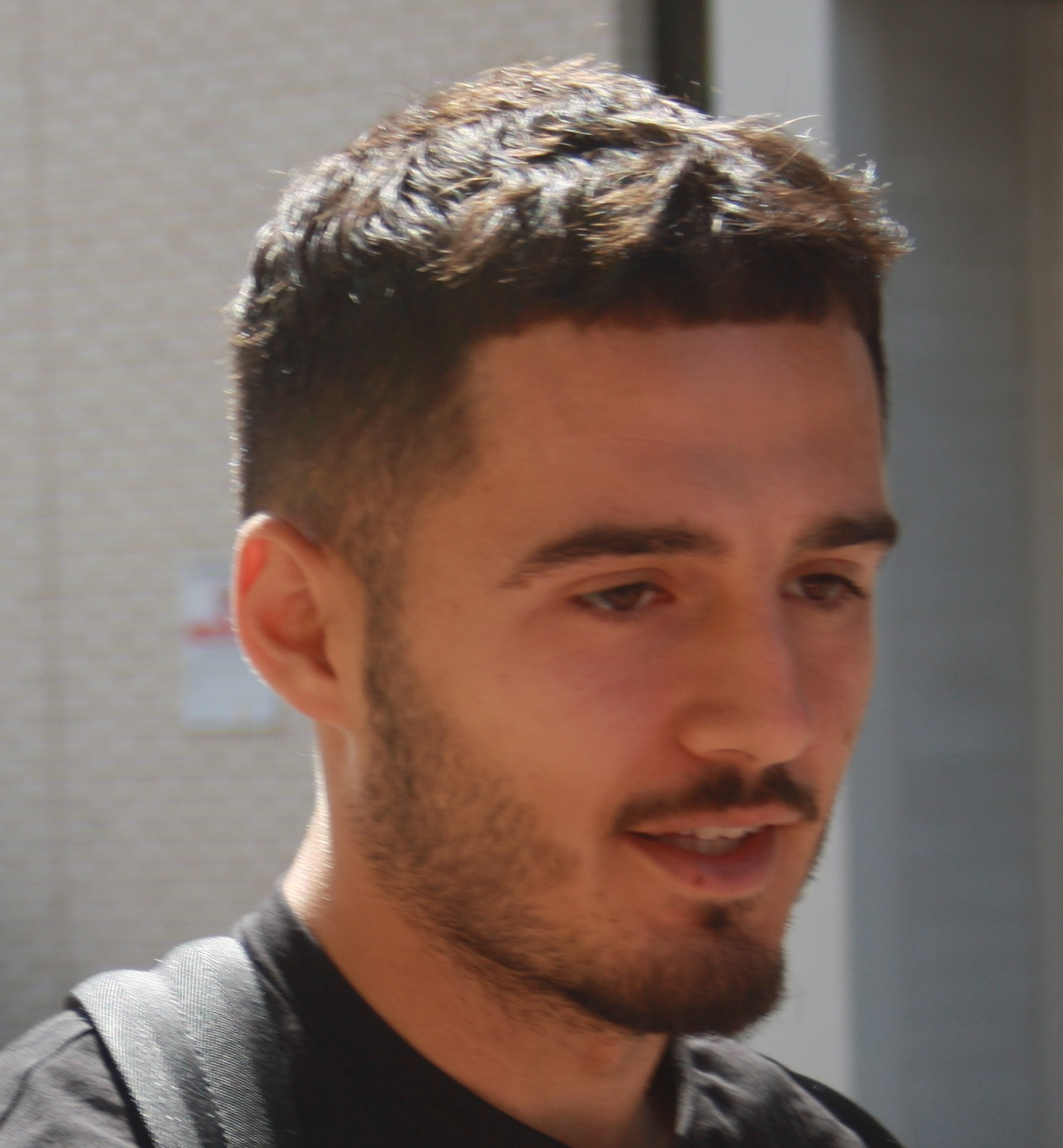
- Dobra in 2026

Personal information
- Full name: Armando Dobra
- Date of birth: 14 April 2001 (age 25)
- Place of birth: Redbridge, England
- Height: 1.70 m (5 ft 7 in)
- Positions: Attacking midfielder; winger

Team information
- Current team: Leyton Orient
- Number: 17

Youth career
- 2017–2019: Ipswich Town

Senior career*
Years	Team	Apps	(Gls)
2019–2022	Ipswich Town	22	(0)
2021–2022	→ Colchester United (loan)	11	(1)
2022–2026	Chesterfield	144	(30)
2026–	Leyton Orient	10	(1)

International career^{‡}
2019	Albania U19	7	(1)
2020–2022	Albania U21	11	(1)
- * Club domestic league appearances and goals as of 20:10, 25 October 2026 (UTC) ‡ National team caps and goals as of 22:09, 7 June 2022 (UTC)

Armando Dobra (born 14 April 2001) is a professional footballer who plays as a midfielder for EFL League One club Leyton Orient. Born in England, he represents Albania's youth teams internationally.

== Club career ==
=== Ipswich Town ===
Dobra joined the Ipswich Town academy in 2017, progressing through the youth system at Portman Road. He signed his first professional contract on 27 February 2019, signing an 18-month deal with the option of a further years extension. He scored on his first-team debut for the club in a 3–1 loss to Luton Town in an EFL Cup first round tie, on 13 August 2019.

His second appearance with the Ipswich Town first-team saw him assist both goals in a 2–1 win against Tottenham Hotspur U21s in the EFL Trophy group stage on 3 September 2019. The following month he appeared in another group stage match, coming on as a substitute to assist the final goal in a 4–0 win against Gillingham. Dobra made his first league appearance for Ipswich on 20 October 2019, coming on from the bench in a 2–0 loss against Accrington Stanley. On 6 May 2020, Ipswich took up the option to extend Dobra's contract by a further year, keeping him at the club until 2021. He signed a new three-year contract with Ipswich on 20 May 2020, keeping him at the club until 2023 with the option of a further year extension.

On 4 July 2022, Dobra left Ipswich by mutual consent.

==== Colchester United (loan) ====
Dobra moved to Colchester United on 31 August 2021 on a season-long loan. He made his club debut on 7 September in Colchester's 1–0 defeat to Gillingham in the EFL Trophy. He scored his first goal for the club in Colchester's 1–0 win against West Ham United Under-21s in the EFL Trophy on 28 September.

=== Chesterfield ===
On 5 July 2022, Dobra joined National League club Chesterfield on a two-year contract. He scored on his debut for the club in a 2–2 draw against Dorking.

Despite missing several games due to injury, Dobra finished his first season at Chesterfield as their top scorer with 12 goals, narrowly missing out on promotion against Notts County in the play-off final in which he scored.

Following promotion to League Two after the 2023–24 season, Dobra was voted Player of the Year in Chesterfield's first season back in the EFL.

== International career ==
Born in England, Dobra qualifies to play for Albania through his father. He made his debut for the Albania U19 team in a friendly on 24 March 2019, featuring in a 1–1 draw with Macedonia U19 in Korça. He won his second cap in another friendly with Macedonia on 26 March 2019, coming on as a half-time substitute in a 2–1 defeat in Ohrid.

In August 2019, Dobra was called up to the Albania U19s for two friendlies against Bosnia and Herzegovina. He featured in both friendly matches, with the first game ending in a 0–0 draw and the second result a 2–0 loss, winning his fourth and fifth caps respectively for the U19s.

On 13 November 2019, Dobra scored his first international goal in a 5–1 loss against Greece U19s in the 2020 UEFA European Under-19 Championship qualification stage.

On 11 March 2020, Dobra received his first call up to the Albania U21 national team for a UEFA European Under-21 Championship qualifier against Kosovo U21, although the matches were postponed due to the outbreak of the Coronavirus. He was called up to the U21 side again in August 2020 for 2021 UEFA European Under-21 Championship qualifiers in September 2020. He made his debut for the Albania U21s on 4 September in a 5–1 win against Austria U21.

== Career statistics ==
As of match played 16 May 2025

Appearances and goals by club, season and competition
Club	Season	Division	League		FA Cup		EFL Cup		Other		Total	
Club	Season	Division	Apps	Goals	Apps	Goals	Apps	Goals	Apps	Goals	Apps	Goals
Ipswich Town	2019–20	League One	3	0	1	0	1	1	3 (Note: Appearance(s) in EFL Trophy)	0	8	1
Ipswich Town	2020–21	League One	17	0	0	0	1	0	1	1	19	1
Ipswich Town	2021–22	League One	2	0	0	0	1	0	0	0	3	0
Ipswich Town	Total		22	0	1	0	3	1	4	1	30	2
Colchester United (loan)	2021–22	League Two	11	1	2	0	—		4	1	17	2
Chesterfield	2022–23	National League	27	6	5	5	—		2 (Note: Appearances in National League play-offs)	1	34	12
Chesterfield	2023–24	National League	43	10	3	0	—		—		46	10
Chesterfield	2024–25	League Two	42	9	2	1	1	1	6	2	51	13
Chesterfield	2025–26	League Two	6	3	0	0	1	0	0	0	7	3
Chesterfield	Total		118	28	10	6	2	1	8	3	138	38
Career total			151	29	13	6	5	2	16	5	185	42

== Honours ==
Chesterfield

- National League: 2023–24
- Chesterfield FC Player of the Year: 2024/25
