= Will Dickson =

English association football player (born 2004)

Personal information
- Full name: William Steven Dickson
- Date of birth: 25 November 2004 (age 21)
- Position: Forward

Team information
- Current team: Chesterfield
- Number: 25

Youth career
- –2025: Manchester City

Senior career*
Years	Team	Apps	(Gls)
2025–2026	Manchester City	0	(0)
2025	→ Motherwell (loan)	7	(0)
2025–2026	→ Chesterfield (loan)	15	(1)
2026–	Chesterfield	9	(2)
- * Club domestic league appearances and goals as of 16:07, 26 May 2026 (UTC)

William Steven Dickson (born 25 November 2004) is an English professional footballer who plays as a forward for EFL League Two club Chesterfield.

== Career ==
=== Manchester City ===
A product of the Manchester City academy, he signed scholarship terms with the club in 2021. He scored 19 goals for the City U18 side which won the league in 2021-22. After stepping up to the Elite Development Squad the following season he scored 18 times in 38 appearances. He signed a professional contract with the club in July 2023. However, his time in the Manchester City academy was also hampered by spells on the sidelines with injury. He was included with the first-team for their UEFA Champions League match against Slovan Bratislava in September 2024.

He joined Scottish Premiership side Motherwell on a six-month loan deal on 1 February 2025. He was immediately included in the Motherwell first-team squad for their league match against Celtic on 2 February 2025 and made his debut as a second-half substitute.

=== Chesterfield ===
On 1 September 2025, Dickson joined League Two club Chesterfield on loan until the end of the 2025–26 season. On 16 January 2026, Dickson signed for Chesterfield permanently, for an undisclosed fee.

== Career statistics ==
As of match played 1 January 2026

Appearances and goals by club, season and competition
Club	Season	League			National cup (Note: Includes FA Cup and Scottish Cup)		League cup (Note: Includes EFL Cup and Scottish League Cup)		Continental		Other		Total	
Club	Season	Division	Apps	Goals	Apps	Goals	Apps	Goals	Apps	Goals	Apps	Goals	Apps	Goals
Manchester City U21	2022–23	—			—		—		—		3 (Note: Appearance(s) in EFL Trophy)	2	3	2
Manchester City U21	2023–24	—			—		—		—		3	2	3	2
Manchester City U21	2024–25	—			—		—		—		3	0	3	0
Manchester City U21	Total		—		—		—		—		9	4	9	4
Manchester City	2024–25	Premier League	0	0	0	0	0	0	0	0	0	0	0	0
Manchester City	2025–26	Premier League	0	0	0	0	0	0	0	0	—		0	0
Manchester City	Total		0	0	0	0	0	0	0	0	0	0	0	0
Motherwell (loan)	2024–25	Scottish Premiership	7	0	—		—		—		—		7	0
Chesterfield (loan)	2025–26	League Two	15	1	0	0	0	0	—		3	0	18	1
Chesterfield	2025–26	League Two	0	0	0	0	0	0	0	0	0	0	0	0
Career total			22	1	0	0	0	0	0	0	12	4	34	5
