= 2026–27 Chesterfield F.C. season =

160th season in existence of Chesterfield FC

Chesterfield
2026–27 season
- Owner: Ashley Kirk
- Chairman: Ashley Kirk
- Manager: Paul Cook
- Stadium: SMH Group Stadium

The 2026–27 season is the 160th season in the history of Chesterfield Football Club and their third consecutive season in League Two. The club are participating in League Two, the FA Cup, the EFL Cup and the EFL Trophy.

== Transfers and contracts ==
=== In ===
Date	Pos.	Player	From	Fee	Ref.
22 June 2026	CB	(England) Junior Eccleston	(England) Sutton United	Undisclosed	
1 July 2026 (Note: The transfer was announced on 24 June, and would become official on July 1 once McEachran's contract at Grimsby Town expired.)	CM	(England) George McEachran	(England) Grimsby Town	Free	
2 July 2026	CB	(England) Jack Simpson	(England) Leyton Orient	Free	
6 July 2026	CB	(England) Alfie Pond	(England) Wolverhampton Wanderers	Free transfer	
9 July 2026	CF	(Cyprus) Ruel Sotiriou	(Israel) Hapoel Jerusalem	Free transfer	
17 July 2026	LW	(Latvia) Danny Anisjko	(England) Nottingham Forest	Free	
17 July 2026	RB	(England) Remeao Hutton	(England) Gillingham	Free	
27 July 2026	CF	(Scotland) Fraser Bryden	(Northern Ireland) Crusaders	£120,000	
9 October 2026	GK	(Gibraltar) Victor Huart	(Gibraltar) Lynx	Free	
2 November 2026	CF	(Malta) Jaylen Zarb	(Malta) Pietà Hotspurs	Free	

=== Loaned in ===
Date	Pos.	Player	From	Loaned until	Ref.
9 July 2026	LW	(Sierra Leone) Josh Koroma	(England) Leyton Orient	End of Season	
30 July 2026	CM	(England) Rafiq Lamptey	(England) Millwall	End of Season	
31 August 2026	SS	(England) Louie Marsh	(England) Sheffield United	End of Season	
1 September 2026	CAM	(England) Joel Randall	(England) Bolton Wanderers	End of Season	
2 September 2026	CM	(England) Kiano Dyer	(England) Chelsea	End of Season	

=== Loaned out ===
Date	Pos.	Player	To	Loaned until	Ref.
3 September 2026	CDM	(Scotland) Luke Butterfield	(England) AFC Fylde	End of Season	
3 September 2026	CB	(England) Alex Whitney	(England) Hyde United	1 January 2027	
29 September 2026	CB	(Jamaica) Chey Dunkley	(England) Soliull Moors	26 December 2026	
12 October 2026	CF	(Malta) Gunner Elliott	(England) Ilkeston Town	12 November 2026	
23 October 2026	LW	(Latvia) Danni Anisjko	(England) Bedford Town	22 November 2026	

=== Out ===
Date	Pos.	Player	To	Fee	Ref.
24 June 2026	LW	(Albania) Armando Dobra	(England) Leyton Orient	Undisclosed	
23 October 2026	CF	(Northern Ireland) Will Grigg	(England) Forest Green Rovers	Free transfer	

=== Released / Out of Contract ===
Date	Pos.	Player	Subsequent club	Joined date	Ref.
30 June 2026	RB	(Saint Lucia) Janoi Donacien	(England) Northampton Town	1 July 2026	
30 June 2026	CAM	(England) Bailey Hobson	(England) Harrogate Town	1 July 2026	
30 June 2026	LB	(England) Adam Lewis	(England) Fylde	2 July 2026	
30 June 2026	RB	(England) Vontae Daley-Campbell	(England) Southend United	5 July 2026	
30 June 2026	CB	(England) Jamie Grimes	(England) Boston United	22 July 2026	
30 June 2026	LW	(Gibraltar) Liam Jessop	(Northern Ireland) Portadown	24 July 2026	
30 June 2026	CF	(Republic of Ireland) Paddy Madden	(Republic of Ireland) Bohemian	11 August 2026	
30 June 2026	CM	(Scotland) John Fleck			
30 June 2026	CF	(Wales) Ben Hole			
30 June 2026	CF	(England) Freddie Ladapo			
30 June 2026	GK	(Australia) Ashton Rinaldo			

=== New Contract ===
Date	Pos.	Player	Contract expiry	Ref.
22 May 2026	CF	(Malta) Gunner Elliott	30 June 2027	
2 July 2026	CB	(England) Kyle McFadzean	30 June 2027	
3 July 2026	GK	(Malta) James Sissons	30 June 2027 (Note: First professional contract)	
3 July 2026	CB	(England) Alex Whitney	30 June 2027	

== Pre-season and friendlies ==
On 20 May, the Spireites announced their a pre-season friendly, against FC Halifax Town. Two days later, a trip to locals Clay Cross Town was added. On 1 June, a third opponent for pre-season was confirmed against Sheffield United. On 5 July, a pre-season trip to Scunthorpe United was announced. Four days later, a pre-season training camp in Republic of Ireland was announced along with a friendly against Bohemian in Dublin. On 16 July, a behind closed doors meeting with Boston United was confirmed.

Win Draw Loss Fixtures

4 July 2026 Friendly	Clay Cross Town	0–2	Chesterfield	Clay Cross
15:00 BST		Report	Elliott 2' (pen.); McEachran 48'	Stadium: The Adalynne Haye Stadium

11 July 2026 Friendly	Chesterfield	0–0	Sheffield United	Whittington Moor
15:00 BST		Report		Stadium: SMH Group Stadium; Attendance: 5,882

14 July 2026 Friendly	FC Halifax Town	3–2	Chesterfield	Halifax
19:45 BST	Douglas 21'; Trialist D 49'; Hnami 90+2'	Report	Sotiriou 89'; Koroma 90'	Stadium: The Shay; Attendance: 362 (80 away)

18 July 2026 Friendly	Chesterfield	v	Boston United	Wingerworth
TBC BST				Stadium: The Avenue Training Ground; Attendance: 0 (BCD)

24 July 2026 Friendly	Bohemian	2–2	Chesterfield	Phibsborough, Republic of Ireland
18:00 BST	Myers; Byrne	Report	Markanday; Bonis	Stadium: Dalymount Park; Attendance: 707

31 July 2026 Friendly	Scunthorpe United	1–1	Chesterfield	Scunthorpe
19:30 BST	Beestin 87'	Report	McEachran 48'	Stadium: The Attis Arena; Attendance: 1,512 (202 away)

== Competitions ==
=== League Two ===
==== League table ====
Pos	Team	Pld	W	D	L	GF	GA	GD	Pts	Promotion, qualification or relegation
1	Salford City	16	10	3	3	27	17	+10	33	Promotion to EFL League One
2	Barnet	14	8	5	1	30	19	+11	29	Promotion to EFL League One
3	Chesterfield	16	7	4	5	30	22	+8	25	Promotion to EFL League One
4	Grimsby Town	16	6	6	4	28	19	+9	24	Qualification for League Two play-offs
5	York City	16	6	6	4	25	21	+4	24	Qualification for League Two play-offs

Updated to match(es) played on 21 November 2026. Source: EFL Official Website
Rules for classification: 1) Points; 2) Goal difference; 3) Number of goals scored; 4) Head-to-head results; 5) Wins; 6) Away goals; 7) Penalty points (sec 9.5); 8) 12-point sending off offences

==== Results summary ====
Overall								Home						Away					
Pld	W	D	L	GF	GA	GD	Pts	W	D	L	GF	GA	GD	W	D	L	GF	GA	GD
16	7	4	5	30	22	+8	25	4	3	1	20	10	+10	3	1	4	10	12	−2

Last updated: 21 November 2026.
Source: Soccerway

==== Results by round ====
Round	1	2	3	4	5	6	7	8	9	10	11	12	13	14	15	16	17	18	19	20	21	22	23	24	25
Ground	H	A	A	H	H	A	H	A	H	A	A	H	H	A	A	H	A	H	H	A	H	A	A	H	H
Result	L	W	L	D	D	W	W	L	W	D	L	D	W	L	W	W									
Position	17	16	16	16	17	12	8	11	8	7	7	9	7	10	7	3									
Points	0	3	3	4	5	8	11	11	14	15	15	16	19	19	22	25									

Source: EFL
A = Away; H = Home; W = Win; D = Draw; L = Loss; P = Postponed

==== Matches ====
On 25 June, the League Two fixtures were revealed.

Win Draw Loss Fixtures

15 August 2026 1	Chesterfield	0–1	Fleetwood Town	Whittington Moor
15:00 BST	McFadzean (yellow card) 28'	Report	Evans (yellow card) 30', (goal) 35'; Cirino (yellow card) 45+3'; Neal (yellow card) 81'	Stadium: SMH Group Stadium; Attendance: 7,856; Referee: Alan Dale

22 August 2026 2	Salford City	0–1	Chesterfield	Kersal
12:30 BST	Garbutt (yellow card) 57'; Wiredu (yellow card) 90+5'	Report	Bonis 2'; Mandeville (yellow card) 44'; Simpson (yellow card) 53'; Lamptey (yellow card) 90+4'	Stadium: AIG Stadium; Referee: Scott Oldham
Note: Fixture was initially scheduled for a 15:00 kick-off, but was brought forward for live Sky Sports.

29 August 2026 3	Rotherham United	2–1	Chesterfield	Rotherham
13:00 BST	Tavares 12'; Cover (yellow card) 17'; Bradshaw (penalty missed) 41'; Buyabu (yellow card) 43'; Mullin 90'	Report	Bonis (yellow card) 18'; Mandeville 88' (pen.)	Stadium: AESSEAL New York Stadium; Attendance: 9,291 (inc. 2,285 away fans); Referee: Seb Stockbridge
Note: Fixture was initially scheduled for a 15:00 kick-off, but was brought forward two hours following discussion with local authorities.

1 September 2026 4	Chesterfield	1–1	Gillingham	Whittington Moor
19:45 BST	Koroma 22'; McFadzean (yellow card) 31'	Report	Dobbs (yellow card) 29'; Hale 58'; Goodwin (yellow card) 90+5'	Stadium: SMH Group Stadium; Attendance: 6,103; Referee: Ross Martin

5 September 2026 5	Chesterfield	3–3	Barnet	Whittington Moor
15:00 BST	Hutton (yellow card) 21'; McEachran (yellow card) 33'; Pond (yellow card) 37'; Marsh 39', 71'; Randall 90+3'	Report	Knowles 29'; Williams 45+3'; Gallagher (yellow card) 50'; Comley (yellow card) 60'; Kanu (yellow card) 72'; Tshimanga 88'	Stadium: SMH Group Stadium; Referee: Leigh Doughty

12 September 2026 6	Oldham Athletic	1–2	Chesterfield	Oldham
15:00 BST	Norburn (yellow card) 28'; Fawunmi 50'; Delaney (yellow card) 55'	Report	Bonis (penalty missed) 18', 18'; Hutton (yellow card) 30'; McFadzean (yellow card) 37'; Markanday 52'; Eccleston (yellow card) 82'	Stadium: Boundary Park; Attendance: 8,083 (1,137 away); Referee: Matt Corlett

19 September 2026 7	Chesterfield	2–0	York City	Whittington Moor
15:00 BST	McEachran (yellow card) 23'; Bonis 57'; Markanday 90+7'		Banks (yellow card) 80'; Pearce (yellow card) 90'	Stadium: SMH Group Stadium; Referee: Ben Speedie

26 September 2026 8	Cheltenham Town	2–1	Chesterfield	Cheltenham
15:00 BST	Sweeney (yellow card) 12'; McCann 17'; Weimann 37', (yellow card) 84'; Shipley (yellow card) 55'; Willcox (yellow card) 89'	Report	Marsh 49'	Stadium: EV Charger Points Stadium; Attendance: 4,402; Referee: Dean Whitestone

3 October 2026 9	Chesterfield	4–2	Tranmere Rovers	Whittington Moor
12:30 BST	Markanday 15'; Bonis (yellow card) 21'; McEachran (yellow card) 54'; McFadzean (yellow card) 79'; Marsh 83'; Koroma 85', 90+1'	Report	Conlon (yellow card) 18'; Ironside (yellow card) 41'; Senior (yellow card) 57'; Jones 59'; Slater 90+4'	Stadium: SMH Group Stadium; Attendance: 8,186 (795 away); Referee: Thomas Parsons
Note: Fixture was initially scheduled for a 15:00 kick-off, but was brought forward for live Sky Sports.

10 October 2026 10	Crawley Town	2–2	Chesterfield	Crawley
15:00 BST	Jennings (yellow card) 44'; Di Biase 61' (pen.), 66', (yellow card) 83'; Russell (yellow card) 90+4'	Report	Bonis 23'; Marsh 56', (yellow card) 80'; Koroma (yellow card) 65'; Markanday (yellow card) 90'; Gordon (yellow card) 90+4'	Stadium: Broadfield Stadium; Attendance: 3,474; Referee: Ben Atkinson

17 October 2026 11	Port Vale	1–0	Chesterfield	Burslem
15:00 BST	Humphreys (yellow card) 15'; Lawrence-Gabriel (yellow card) 30'; Hernández 45'; Headley (yellow card) 59'	Report	Stirk (yellow card) 54'; Gordon (yellow card) 64'	Stadium: Vale Park; Attendance: 7,829; Referee: Harrison Blair

20 October 2026 12	Chesterfield	1–1	Colchester United	Whittington Moor
19:45 BST	Markanday 29'; Gordon (yellow card) 34'; Pond (yellow card) 54'; Stirk (yellow card) 79'	Report	Ihionvien (yellow card) 36'; Hunt (yellow card) 58'; Perry 82'	Stadium: SMH Group Stadium; Attendance: 6,974; Referee: Paul Howard

24 October 2026 13	Chesterfield	5–1	Crewe Alexandra	Whittington Moor
15:00 BST	Koroma 3'; Naylor 6'; Bryden 19'; Stephenson 35' (o.g.); Mandeville 45+2'	Report	McNeill 57'	Stadium: SMH Group Stadium; Attendance: 7,985; Referee: William Davis

30 October 2026 14	Newport County	4–1	Chesterfield	Newport
19:45 GMT	Norman 14'; Davies 18'; Biggins 29'; Bamba 45+2'; Brennan (yellow card) 76'; Garner (yellow card) 89'	Report	Hutton (yellow card) 13'; McEachran (yellow card) 17'; Mandeville (yellow card) 23', (goal) 58'; Simpson (yellow card) 90+4'	Stadium: Rodney Parade; Attendance: 4,799; Referee: Zac Kennard-Kettle
Note: Fixture was initially scheduled for 31 October, but was brought forward to the night before.

14 November 2026 15	Bristol Rovers	0–2	Chesterfield	Bristol
15:00 GMT		Report	McFadzean (yellow card) 6'; Marsh 24'; Bonis (yellow card) 42', (goal) 77'	Stadium: Memorial Stadium; Attendance: 8,661 (inc. 673 Chesterfield fans); Referee: Neil Hair

21 November 2026 16	Chesterfield	4–1	Shrewsbury Town	Whittington Moor
15:00 GMT	Duffy 11', (yellow card) 35', (goal) 37'; Randall 18'; Stirk (yellow card) 53'; Markanday 66'; Simpson (yellow card) 88'	Report	McMahon-Brown 33'; Sang (yellow card) 45+3'; Golding (yellow card) 90'	Stadium: SMH Group Stadium; Attendance: 8,023; Referee: George Laflin

28 November 2026 17	Swindon Town	v	Chesterfield	Swindon
15:00 GMT				Stadium: Nigel Eady County Ground

1 December 2026 18	Chesterfield	v	Exeter City	Whittington Moor
19:45 GMT				Stadium: SMH Group Stadium

12 December 2026 19	Chesterfield	v	Grimsby Town	Whittington Moor
12:30 GMT				Stadium: SMH Group Stadium
Note: Fixture was initially scheduled for a 15:00 kick-off, but was brought forward for live Sky Sports broadcasting.

19 December 2026 20	Accrington Stanley	v	Chesterfield	Accrington
15:00 GMT				Stadium: Wham Stadium

26 December 2026 21	Chesterfield	v	Northampton Town	Whittington Moor
15:00 GMT				Stadium: SMH Group Stadium

29 December 2026 22	Walsall	v	Chesterfield	Bescot
15:00 GMT				Stadium: Pallet-Track Bescot Stadium

1 January 2027 23	Rochdale	v	Chesterfield	Spotland
15:00 GMT				Stadium: Crown Oil Arena

9 January 2027 24	Chesterfield	v	Accrington Stanley	Whittington Moor
12:30 GMT				Stadium: SMH Group Stadium
Note: Fixture was initially scheduled for a 15:00 kick-off, but was brought forward for live Sky Sports broadcasting.

16 January 2027 25	Chesterfield	v	Port Vale	Whittington Moor
12:30 GMT				Stadium: SMH Group Stadium
Note: Fixture was initially scheduled for a 15:00 kick-off, but was brought forward for live Sky Sports broadcasting.

=== FA Cup ===
Chesterfield were drawn at home to Yeovil Town in the first round and to Cheltenham Town in the second round.

Win Draw Loss Fixtures

7 November 2026 First round	Chesterfield	4–3	Yeovil Town	Whittington Moor
15:00 GMT	Simpson 43', 55'; Koroma 45'; Randall 89'	Report	Spasov 38' (pen.); Daly 78'; Muller 82'	Stadium: SMH Group Stadium; Attendance: 4,010 (inc. 514 Yeovil fans); Referee: Scott Oldham

4–7 December 2026 Second round	Chesterfield	v	Cheltenham Town	Whittington Moor
TBA GMT				Stadium: SMH Group Stadium

=== EFL Cup ===
The draw for the first round was made on 25 June.

Win Draw Loss Fixtures

8 August 2026 First round	Fleetwood Town	1–0	Chesterfield	Fleetwood
15:00 BST	Evans 14'; Thompson-Sommers (yellow card) 61'; McCann (yellow card) 86'; Potter (yellow card) 90'	Report	Koroma (yellow card) 65'; McFadzean (yellow card) 89'	Stadium: Highbury Stadium; Attendance: 1,619 (inc. 579 Chesterfield supporters); Referee: Martin Coy

=== EFL Trophy ===
==== Group stage ====
Chesterfield were drawn against Mansfield Town, Port Vale and Manchester City U21 into Northern Group D.

Pos	Div	Team	Pld	W	PW	PL	L	GF	GA	GD	Pts	Qualification
1	L2	Chesterfield	3	2	1	0	0	11	7	+4	8	Advance to Round 2
2	L2	Port Vale	3	2	0	1	0	8	1	+7	7	Advance to Round 2
3	ACA	Manchester City U21	3	1	0	0	2	7	11	−4	3	
4	L1	Mansfield Town	3	0	0	0	3	4	11	−7	0	

Source: EFL

Win Draw Loss Fixtures

15 September 2026 Group stage	Chesterfield	5–3	Manchester City U21	Whittington Moor
19:00 BST	Randall 12'; Bryden 23'; Dyer (yellow card) 28'; Dunkley 49'; Eccleston 75'; Pond (yellow card) 88'; Marsh 90+2'		X. Parker 16'; Lamb 38'; Henderson-Hall (yellow card) 55'; H. Parker (yellow card) 88'; Wain 90+3'	Stadium: SMH Group Stadium; Attendance: 1,469; Referee: Aaron Bannister

22 September 2026 Group stage	Chesterfield	1–1 (4–3 p)	Port Vale	Whittington Moor
19:00 BST	Marsh 69'	Report	Lawrence-Gabriel (yellow card) 18'; Hernández 39'; McGowan (yellow card) 89'	Stadium: SMH Group Stadium; Attendance: 1,319; Referee: Richie Watkins
	Penalties
	Grigg (penalty scored); Marsh (penalty scored); Mandeville (penalty scored); Cook (penalty missed); Duffy (penalty scored)		Hall (penalty scored); Asamoah (penalty missed); Headley (penalty scored); Walters (penalty scored); Humphreys (penalty missed)

10 November 2026 Group stage	Mansfield Town	3–5	Chesterfield	Mansfield
19:00 GMT	Russell 13' (pen.), 20'; Hendry 61'; Dodgson (yellow card) 86'	Report	Lamptey (yellow card) 18'; Randall 45'; Duffy 62', 70'; Naylor 67'; Mandeville 88'	Stadium: One Call Stadium; Attendance: 5,233 (inc. 1,579 Chesterfield fans); Referee: Sam Mulhall

== Statistics ==
=== Appearances and goals ===
As of match played 21 November 2026

Players with no appearances are not included on the list; italics indicate a loaned in player

No.	Pos	Nat	Player	Total		League Two		FA Cup		EFL Cup		EFL Trophy	
No.	Pos	Nat	Player	Apps	Goals	Apps	Goals	Apps	Goals	Apps	Goals	Apps	Goals
1	GK	(England) ENG	Zach Hemming	6	0	4+0	0	1+0	0	0+0	0	1+0	0
2	DF	(Canada) CAN	Malik Owolabi-Belewu	3	0	0+3	0	0+0	0	0+0	0	0+0	0
4	MF	(England) ENG	Tom Naylor	16	2	3+9	1	0+0	0	0+1	0	3+0	1
5	DF	(England) ENG	Kyle McFadzean	13	0	11+0	0	0+0	0	1+0	0	1+0	0
6	DF	(England) ENG	Jack Simpson	19	2	16+0	0	1+0	2	1+0	0	0+1	0
7	MF	(England) ENG	Liam Mandeville	20	4	7+9	3	1+0	0	0+1	0	1+1	1
8	MF	(Wales) WAL	Ryan Stirk	16	0	14+0	0	1+0	0	1+0	0	0+0	0
9	FW	(Scotland) SCO	Fraser Bryden	15	2	3+7	1	0+1	0	0+1	0	3+0	1
10	FW	(Northern Ireland) NIR	Lee Bonis	17	5	12+3	5	1+0	0	1+0	0	0+0	0
11	MF	(Republic of Ireland) IRL	Dylan Duffy	7	4	1+3	2	0+1	0	0+0	0	1+1	2
15	DF	(England) ENG	Alfie Pond	8	0	5+0	0	1+0	0	0+0	0	2+0	0
17	FW	(Cyprus) CYP	Ruel Sotiriou	3	0	1+1	0	0+0	0	1+0	0	0+0	0
18	FW	(England) ENG	Louie Marsh	17	8	11+2	6	1+0	0	0+0	0	0+3	2
19	DF	(Scotland) SCO	Lewis Gordon	19	0	14+2	0	1+0	0	1+0	0	0+1	0
20	MF	(England) ENG	George McEachran	18	0	15+0	0	0+1	0	1+0	0	1+0	0
21	FW	(Latvia) LAT	Danny Anisjko	4	0	0+2	0	0+0	0	0+1	0	1+0	0
22	DF	(Jamaica) JAM	Chey Dunkley	2	1	0+0	0	0+0	0	0+0	0	2+0	1
23	GK	(England) ENG	Ryan Boot	14	0	12+0	0	0+0	0	1+0	0	1+0	0
24	FW	(England) ENG	Dilan Markanday	19	5	14+2	5	0+1	0	1+0	0	1+0	0
26	DF	(England) ENG	Junior Eccleston	8	1	0+5	0	0+0	0	0+0	0	3+0	1
27	MF	(England) ENG	Kiano Dyer	14	0	0+10	0	1+0	0	0+0	0	2+1	0
28	FW	(Northern Ireland) NIR	Will Grigg	3	0	0+2	0	0+0	0	0+0	0	0+1	0
30	MF	(England) ENG	Rafiq Lamptey	6	0	0+3	0	0+0	0	0+0	0	3+0	0
31	MF	(England) ENG	Joel Randall	14	5	5+5	2	0+1	1	0+0	0	3+0	2
33	DF	(England) ENG	Remeao Hutton	19	0	16+0	0	1+0	0	1+0	0	0+1	0
37	FW	(Sierra Leone) SLE	Josh Koroma	18	5	10+5	4	1+0	1	1+0	0	0+1	0
40	MF	(England) ENG	Connor Cook	2	0	0+0	0	0+0	0	0+0	0	0+2	0
42	DF	(England) ENG	Alex Whitney	2	0	0+0	0	0+0	0	0+0	0	0+2	0
43	GK	(Malta) MLT	James Sissons	1	0	0+0	0	0+0	0	0+0	0	1+0	0
46	DF	(England) ENG	Tom Pearce	9	0	2+4	0	0+0	0	0+0	0	3+0	0
