= 2026–27 Port Vale F.C. season =

115th season in existence of Port Vale FC

Port Vale F.C.
2026–27 season
- Owner: Synsol Holdings Limited
- Chairlady: Carol Shanahan
- Manager: Jon Brady
- Stadium: Vale Park
- League Two: 19th (18 points)
- FA Cup: Second Round
- EFL Cup: First Round (eliminated by Wolverhampton Wanderers)
- EFL Trophy: Round of 32
- Top goalscorer: League: George Byers, Onel Hernández (3); All: Onel Hernández (4)
- Highest home attendance: 8,997 vs. Crewe Alexandra, 29 August 2026
- Lowest home attendance: 841 vs. Mansfield Town, 6 October 2026
- Average home league attendance: 7,398
- Biggest win: 5–0 vs. Manchester City U21, 27 October 2026
- Biggest defeat: 3–0 vs. Wolverhampton Wanderers, 7 August 2026
Home colours	Away colours

The 2026–27 season is the 115th season in the history of Port Vale Football Club and their first season back in League Two since the 2024–25 season, following their relegation from League One in the preceding season.

Manager Jon Brady oversaw a squad overhaul as 15 players were sold or released, with eight permanent and five loan signings arriving. However, after one win in the opening seven league games, the club sat in the relegation zone by the end of September. The club spent £2 million improving the pitch whilst sacking the Senior Head of Recruitment and bringing in a Sporting Director. Results improved as ten points were gained from five league games in October, in addition to two victories in the EFL Trophy.

== Overview ==
=== EFL League Two ===
The club changed its backroom staff to take more control of recruitment away from the manager, who would still retain final say on transfers. The team went to the Murcia region of Spain for a week-long training camp. The first signing of the summer was 25-year-old defender Jasper Moon, who had become available on a free transfer from Burton Albion. An undisclosed fee was then paid to bring in 24-year-old goalkeer Jackson Smith from Barnsley. A defensive midfielder, 23-year-old former Scotland U21 international Matthew Craig, was then signed from Tottenham Hotspur. Attacking midfielder Kyle Dempsey then arrived on a two-year deal after leaving Bolton Wanderers following the club's promotion to the Championship. Mason Terry, a goalkeeper from the Academy at West Ham United, joined on a season-long loan; the loan was later terminated on 1 September due to a hand injury sustained during training. Striker Oli Lynch also arrived on a season-long loan from Luton Town after top-scoring for Tamworth in 2025–26, whilst Mo Faal rejoined Vale on a season-long loan from Wrexham. Another striker, 27-year-old Max Watters, was then signed on a free transfer from Barnsley. Rico Richards was sold to National League club Southend United for an undisclosed fee. Following successful trial spells, defenders Aaron McGowan and Lewis Montsma, and striker Tyreece Simpson, joined the club on one-year deals. Leaving the club was Jayden Stockley, who went back up to League One with AFC Wimbledon. Ben Garrity continued as club and team captain, with George Byers and Kyle Dempsey as deputies. Jon Brady said it had been his best pre-season as a manager in terms of both performances and results.

The season opened with a 2–0 defeat at Oldham Athletic after Calum Kavanagh scored a second-half brace. This was followed by the opening home game of the campaign, where a Tom Ince goal ensured that Tranmere Rovers come from behind to secure a 1–1 draw despite playing almost the entire of the second half with defender Bobby Faulkner in goal following an injury to goalkeeper Harrison Male. This was followed by a 0–0 draw with local rivals Crewe Alexandra at a rain-soaked Vale Park. As the transfer window closed, the club signed 23-year-old attacker Maleace Asamoah on loan from Wigan Athletic and 20-year-old Honduras international forward Keyrol Figueroa on loan from Liverpool. Later that night, Vale went one goal up at Swindon Town within two minutes, but ended up losing 3–1 and falling to the bottom of the table for only the second time since 1981. The week ended with Smith allowing a free-kick to roll through his hands and into the net to gift struggling Salford City a 1–0 win at Moor Lane. A Byers penalty secured a 1–0 home win over Exeter City, the Vale's first win of the season. The club decided to postpone two league fixtures due to international commitments to allow injured players more time to recover. Before heading into a three-week break from league football, the team lost 2–0 at nearby Walsall.

Brady changed the team to a 3–5–2 formation during the international break. Vale returned to league action on 10 October with a convincing 1–0 home win over Grimsby Town thanks to a long-range effort from Dempsey. The next home game, against Chesterfield, started with a tribute to recently deceased former captain Doug Loft; Onel Hernández scored the only goal of the encounter to give the Vale a second consecutive 1–0 home win. The unbeaten run continued with a 1–1 draw at Gillingham, where half-time substitute Figueroa rescued a point with a 66th-minute equaliser. A 2–0 defeat at York City followed after five changes were made to the first XI. Vale then stormed to a three goal lead over Rochdale within 22 minutes, ending the game with a 4–2 victory. Jon Brady was nominated for the EFL League Two Manager of the Month award.

Vale went on a three-game win streak in all competitions, with a 4–2 win after beating Accrington Stanley at home on 14 November, with a Jaheim Headley brace. The team fell to a 2–1 defeat at second-placed Barnet a week later, with Onel Hernández putting Vale ahead before being controversially sent off for receiving two yellow cards.

=== Finances ===
The club froze season ticket prices for a third consecutive season. The club spent £2 million improving the pitch to a hybrid turf system and improving the training pitches, paid for by the Shanahan family. The shirts were sponsored by celebrity supporter Robbie Williams. The club also gained £180,000 from Ben Waine's presence at the 2026 FIFA World Cup. Over 6,400 season tickets were sold at Vale Park. Lee Darnbrough, Senior Head of Recruitment, left the club in September 2026 after a year in the role. Micky Moore was appointed as Sporting Director the following month. Moore revealed that 80% of the playing budget had been taken up by players at the club the previous season.

=== Cup competitions ===
Vale were drawn at home to National League side Scunthorpe United in the FA Cup first round. Scunthorpe were without a manager and struggling for form, and Vale triumphed with a 4–2 victory despite conceding two goals late on.

Vale were beaten 3–0 by Championship club Wolverhampton Wanderers in the first round of the EFL Cup, conceding all three goals in the first half whilst Faal missed a penalty in the second half.

The EFL Trophy campaign began with a 1–1 draw at Chesterfield, as Chesterfield cancelled out Hernández's first goal for the club in the 69th minute and won the penalty shoot-out. Following a two weeks without a match due to the international break, a strong Vale team defeated Mansfield Town by two goals to nil. Progress into the Round of 32 was confirmed with a 5–0 home win over Manchester City U21.

== Results ==
=== Pre-season ===
Win Draw Loss Fixtures

14 July 2026 Friendly	Port Vale	5–0	Tamworth	Burslem
17:00 BST	Faal 10', 45+1'; Hernández 24'; Gabriel 34'; Bussell 78'	Report		Stadium: Port Vale FC Training Ground; Attendance: 0 (BCD)

18 July 2026 Friendly	Wigan Athletic	1–3	Port Vale	Wigan
13:00 BST	Rimmer 71'	Report	Walters 15', 41'; Simpson 52'	Stadium: Brick Community Stadium

21 July 2026 Friendly	Port Vale	1–1	Bournemouth U21	Murcia
17:30 CEST	Lynch 90'	Report	Kinsey 42'	Stadium: Pinatar Arena; Attendance: 0 (BCD)

25 July 2026 Friendly	Port Vale	1–0	Real Murcia (Spain)	Murcia
19:00 CEST	Gabriel 11'	Report		Stadium: Pinatar Arena

1 August 2026 Friendly	Blackpool	0–1	Port Vale	Blackpool
15:00 BST		Report	Moon 85'	Stadium: Bloomfield Road

4 August 2026 Friendly	Derby County U21	1–1	Port Vale	Derby
12:00 BST	Brewster 74'	Report	Waine 1'	Stadium: Moor Farm Training Centre; Attendance: 0 (BCD)

11 August 2026 Friendly	Port Vale	0–3	PFA XI	Burslem
12:00 BST		Report	Sutton; Healey 57'; Norwood 75'	Stadium: Port Vale FC Training Ground; Attendance: 0 (BCD)

=== EFL League Two ===
==== League table ====
Pos	Team	Pld	W	D	L	GF	GA	GD	Pts
17	Swindon Town	16	5	4	7	16	23	−7	19
18	Northampton Town	15	4	6	5	13	13	0	18
19	Port Vale	14	5	3	6	15	18	−3	18
20	Oldham Athletic	16	4	4	8	17	22	−5	16
21	Colchester United	15	3	6	6	15	21	−6	15

Updated to match(es) played on 21 November 2026. Source: EFL Official Website
Rules for classification: 1) Points; 2) Goal difference; 3) Number of goals scored; 4) Head-to-head results; 5) Wins; 6) Away goals; 7) Penalty points (sec 9.5); 8) 12-point sending off offences

==== Results by matchday ====
Round	1	2	3	4	5	6	7	10	11	12	13	14	15	16	8^{1}	17	18	19	9^{2}	20	21	22	23	24	25	26	27	28	29	30	31	32	33	34	35	36	37	38	39	40	41	42	43	44	45	46
Ground	A	H	H	A	A	H	A	H	H	A	A	H	H	A	H	H	A	A	A	H	A	H	H	A	A	H	H	A	A	H	H	A	A	H	A	H	A	H	A	H	A	H	A	H	A	H
Resultl	L	D	D	L	L	W	L	W	W	D	L	W	W	L																																
Position	23	20	20	24	24	22	23	22	21	20	23	18	17	19																																
Points	0	1	2	2	2	5	5	8	11	12	12	15	18	18																																

Source: EFL
A = Away; H = Home; W = Win; D = Draw; L = Loss; P = Postponed
Notes:
- ^{1} Matchday 8 (vs. Northampton Town) was postponed due to international call-ups.
- ^{2} Matchday 9 (vs. Colchester United) was postponed due to international call-ups.

==== Matches ====
On 25 June, the League Two fixtures were revealed.

Win Draw Loss Fixtures

15 August 2026 1	Oldham Athletic	2–0	Port Vale	Oldham
12:30 BST	Kavanagh 60', 75'	Report		Stadium: Boundary Park; Attendance: 9,449; Referee: Paul Howard; Assistant referees: Joe Simpson, Oliver Nolan; Fourth official: Gareth Thomas
Note: Fixture was initially scheduled for a 15:00 kick-off but was brought forward for live Sky Sports broadcasting.

22 August 2026 2	Port Vale	1–1	Tranmere Rovers	Burslem
15:00 BST	Byers 18' (pen.)	Report	Ince 72'	Stadium: Vale Park; Attendance: 8,668; Referee: Declan Brown; Assistant referees: Darren Wilding, Drew Dutton; Fourth official: Jason Roberts

29 August 2026 3	Port Vale	0–0	Crewe Alexandra	Burslem
12:30 BST				Stadium: Vale Park; Attendance: 8,997; Referee: Ben Toner; Assistant referees: Lewis Raper, Matthew Parry; Fourth official: Jamie O'Connor
Note: Fixture was initially scheduled for a 15:00 kick-off but was brought forward for live Sky Sports broadcasting.

1 September 2026 4	Swindon Town	3–1	Port Vale	Swindon
19:45 BST	Drinan 13'; Middlemas 71'; Millard 90+4'	Report	Lynch 2'	Stadium: County Ground; Attendance: 6,609; Referee: Matthew Corlett; Assistant referees: Alan Cresswell, Michael Webb; Fourth official: Will Briers

5 September 2026 5	Salford City	1–0	Port Vale	Salford
12:30 BST	Powell 52'	Report		Stadium: Moor Lane; Attendance: 3,558; Referee: Ben Atkinson; Assistant referees: Stephen Wade, Wayne Grunnill; Fourth official: Michael Barlow
Note: Fixture was initially scheduled for a 15:00 kick-off but was brought forward for live Sky Sports broadcasting.

12 September 2026 6	Port Vale	1–0	Exeter City	Burslem
15:00 BST	Byers 70' (pen.)	Report		Stadium: Vale Park; Attendance: 6,102; Referee: Leigh Doughty; Assistant referees: Andrew Ellis, Oliver Bickle; Fourth official: Aaron Jackson

19 September 2026 7	Walsall	2–0	Port Vale	Walsall
12:30 BST	Connolly 45+5'; Dallas 89'	Report		Stadium: Bescot Stadium; Attendance: 6,902; Referee: James Oldham; Assistant referees: Jack Clench, Joe Simpson; Fourth official: Matthew Scholes
Note: Fixture was initially scheduled for a 15:00 kick-off but was brought forward for live Sky Sports broadcasting.

10 October 2026 10	Port Vale	1–0	Grimsby Town	Burslem
15:00 BST	Dempsey 45'	Report		Stadium: Vale Park; Attendance: 7,412; Referee: Ross Martin; Assistant referees: Lewis Raper, Zharir Mustafa; Fourth official: Joseph Larkin

17 October 2026 11	Port Vale	1–0	Chesterfield	Burslem
15:00 BST	Hernández 45'	Report		Stadium: Vale Park; Attendance: 7,829; Referee: Harrison Blair; Assistant referees: Harley McKittrick, Daniel Guest; Fourth official: Darren Wilding

20 October 2026 12	Gillingham	1–1	Port Vale	Gillingham
20:00 BST	Hale 42' (pen.)	Report	Figueroa 66'	Stadium: Priestfield Stadium; Attendance: 4,866; Referee: Jamie O'Connor; Assistant referees: Stuart Butler, Andrew Aylott; Fourth official: Adrian Tranter
Note: Fixture was initially scheduled for a 19:45 kick-off but was rescheduled for live Sky Sports broadcasting.

24 October 2026 13	York City	2–0	Port Vale	York
15:00 BST	Johnson 54'; Hunt 62'	Report		Stadium: York Community Stadium; Attendance: 8,236; Referee: David Webb; Assistant referees: Emily Carney, Adam Nichole; Fourth official: Alex Gray

31 October 2026 14	Port Vale	4–2	Rochdale	Burslem
12:30 GMT	Hernández 2'; Byers 11' (pen.); Gabriel 22'; Figueroa 86'	Report	Henderson 82'; Tasker 90+4'	Stadium: Vale Park; Attendance: 6,458; Referee: Declan Bourne; Assistant referees: Marvyn Amphlett, Andrew Ellis; Fourth official: Callum Jones
Note: Fixture was initially scheduled for a 15:00 kick-off but was brought forward for live Sky Sports broadcasting.

14 November 2026 15	Port Vale	4–2	Accrington Stanley	Burslem
15:00 GMT	Headley 8', 61'; Dempsey 27'; Moore 90' (og.)	Report	Henderson 58'; Walton 85'	Stadium: Vale Park; Referee: Simon Mather; Assistant referees: James Wilson, Kieran Forrest; Fourth official: Jason Porter

21 November 2026 16	Barnet	2–1	Port Vale	Canons Park, London
15:00 GMT	Moon 90' (og.); Knowles 49'	Report	Hernández 11'	Stadium: The Hive Stadium; Attendance: 3,010; Referee: Sam Mulhall; Assistant referees: Jon Block, Colman O'Meara; Fourth official: Robert Evans

24 November 2026 8	Port Vale	v	Northampton Town	Burslem
19:45 BST				Stadium: Vale Park
Note: Fixture was originally scheduled for 26 September but was postponed due to international call-ups.

28 November 2026 17	Port Vale	v	Newport County	Burslem
15:00 GMT				Stadium: Vale Park

1 December 2026 18	Crawley Town	v	Port Vale	Crawley
19:45 GMT				Stadium: Broadfield Stadium

12 December 2026 19	Shrewsbury Town	v	Port Vale	Shrewsbury
15:00 GMT				Stadium: New Meadow

15 December 2026 9	Colchester United	v	Port Vale	Colchester
19:45 BST				Stadium: Colchester Community Stadium
Note: Fixture was originally scheduled for 3 October but was postponed due to international call-ups.

19 December 2026 20	Port Vale	v	Rotherham United	Burslem
15:00 GMT				Stadium: Vale Park

26 December 2026 21	Cheltenham Town	v	Port Vale	Cheltenham
15:00 GMT				Stadium: Whaddon Road

29 December 2026 22	Port Vale	v	Bristol Rovers	Burslem
19:45 GMT				Stadium: Vale Park

1 January 2027 23	Port Vale	v	Fleetwood Town	Burslem
15:00 GMT				Stadium: Vale Park

9 January 2027 24	Rotherham United	v	Port Vale	Rotherham
15:00 GMT				Stadium: New York Stadium

16 January 2027 25	Chesterfield	v	Port Vale	Chesterfield
12:30 GMT				Stadium: SMH Group Stadium
Note: Fixture was initially scheduled for a 15:00 kick-off but was brought forward for live Sky Sports broadcasting.

19 January 2027 26	Port Vale	v	Gillingham	Burslem
19:45 GMT				Stadium: Vale Park

23 January 2027 27	Port Vale	v	York City	Burslem
15:00 GMT				Stadium: Vale Park

30 January 2027 28	Rochdale	v	Port Vale	Rochdale
15:00 GMT				Stadium: Spotland Stadium

6 February 2027 29	Crewe Alexandra	v	Port Vale	Crewe
12:30 GMT				Stadium: Gresty Road
Note: Fixture was initially scheduled for a 15:00 kick-off but was brought forward for live Sky Sports broadcasting.

9 February 2027 30	Port Vale	v	Swindon Town	Burslem
19:45 GMT				Stadium: Vale Park

13 February 2027 31	Port Vale	v	Salford City	Burslem
12:30 GMT				Stadium: Vale Park
Note: Fixture was initially scheduled for a 15:00 kick-off but was brought forward for live Sky Sports broadcasting.

20 February 2027 32	Exeter City	v	Port Vale	Exeter
12:30 GMT				Stadium: St James Park
Note: Fixture was initially scheduled for a 15:00 kick-off but was brought forward for live Sky Sports broadcasting.

27 February 2027 33	Accrington Stanley	v	Port Vale	Accrington
15:00 GMT				Stadium: Crown Ground

6 March 2027 34	Port Vale	v	Oldham Athletic	Burslem
15:00 GMT				Stadium: Vale Park

13 March 2027 35	Tranmere Rovers	v	Port Vale	Birkenhead
15:00 GMT				Stadium: Prenton Park

20 March 2027 36	Port Vale	v	Barnet	Burslem
15:00 GMT				Stadium: Vale Park

26 March 2027 37	Fleetwood Town	v	Port Vale	Fleetwood
15:00 GMT				Stadium: Highbury Stadium

29 March 2027 38	Port Vale	v	Cheltenham Town	Burslem
15:00 BST				Stadium: Vale Park

3 April 2027 39	Bristol Rovers	v	Port Vale	Bristol
15:00 BST				Stadium: Memorial Stadium

10 April 2027 40	Port Vale	v	Shrewsbury Town	Burslem
15:00 BST				Stadium: Vale Park

13 April 2027 41	Grimsby Town	v	Port Vale	Cleethorpes
19:45 BST				Stadium: Blundell Park

17 April 2027 42	Port Vale	v	Walsall	Burslem
15:00 BST				Stadium: Vale Park

24 April 2027 43	Northampton Town	v	Port Vale	Northampton
15:00 BST				Stadium: Sixfields Stadium

27 April 2027 44	Port Vale	v	Colchester United	Burslem
19:45 BST				Stadium: Vale Park

1 May 2027 45	Newport County	v	Port Vale	Newport
15:00 BST				Stadium: Rodney Parade

8 May 2027 46	Port Vale	v	Crawley Town	Burslem
15:00 BST				Stadium: Vale Park

=== FA Cup ===
Win Draw Loss Fixtures

7 November 2026 R1	Port Vale	4–2	Scunthorpe United	Burslem
15:00 GMT	Figueroa 8'; Hernández 58'; Watters 61'; Lynch 90+5'	Report	Norwood 86'; Howe 90'	Stadium: Vale Park; Attendance: 3,985; Referee: George Laflin; Assistant referees: Matthew Malton, Mark Ryder; Fourth official: Jonathan Chadwick

5 December 2026 R2	Port Vale	v	Leyton Orient	Burslem
				Stadium: Vale Park

=== EFL Cup ===
Win Draw Loss Fixtures

7 August 2026 R1	Wolverhampton Wanderers	3–0	Port Vale	Wolverhampton
19:45 BST	Armstrong 14'; André 34'; Fer López 43'	Report		Stadium: Molineux Stadium; Referee: David Webb; Assistant referees: Sam Lewis, Richard Woodward; Fourth official: Steven Copeland

=== EFL Trophy ===
==== Group stage ====
Vale were drawn against Mansfield Town, Chesterfield and Manchester City U21 into Northern Group D.

Pos	Div	Team	Pld	W	PW	PL	L	GF	GA	GD	Pts	Qualification
1	L2	Chesterfield	3	2	1	0	0	11	7	+4	8	Advance to Round 2
2	L2	Port Vale	3	2	0	1	0	8	1	+7	7	Advance to Round 2
3	ACA	Manchester City U21	3	1	0	0	2	7	11	−4	3	
4	L1	Mansfield Town	3	0	0	0	3	4	11	−7	0	

Source: EFL

Win Draw Loss Fixtures

22 September 2026 Group stage	Chesterfield	1–1 (4–3 p)	Port Vale	Whittington Moor
19:00 BST	Marsh 69'	Report	Hernández 39'	Stadium: SMH Group Stadium; Attendance: 1,319; Referee: Richie Watkins; Assistant referees: Drew Dutton, Mehul Karia; Fourth official: Kenwyn Hughes
	Penalties
	Grigg (penalty scored); Marsh (penalty scored); Mandeville (penalty scored); Cook (penalty missed); Duffy (penalty scored)		Hall (penalty scored); Asamoah (penalty missed); Headley (penalty scored); Walters (penalty scored); Humphreys (penalty missed)

6 October 2026 Group stage	Port Vale	2–0	Mansfield Town	Burslem
19:00 BST	Gabriel 4'; Asamoah 58'	Report		Stadium: Vale Park; Attendance: 841; Referee: Michael Barlow; Assistant referees: Richard Morris, Mark Bates; Fourth official: Steve Durnall

27 October 2026 Group stage	Port Vale	5–0	Manchester City U21	Burslem
19:00 GMT	Asamoah 4'; McGowan 10'; Watters 30'; Montsma 34'; Figueroa 64'	Report		Stadium: Vale Park; Attendance: 1,183; Referee: Dale Baines; Assistant referees: Sam Wesson, Daniel Smith; Fourth official: Anthony Moore

== Squad statistics ==
=== Appearances and goals ===
As of match played 21 November 2026

Key to positions: GK – Goalkeeper; DF – Defender; MF – Midfielder; FW – Forward

No.	Pos	Nat	Player	Total		EFL League Two		FA Cup		EFL Cup		EFL Trophy	
No.	Pos	Nat	Player	Apps	Goals	Apps	Goals	Apps	Goals	Apps	Goals	Apps	Goals
1	GK	(England) ENG	Jackson Smith	8	0	6	0	0	0	1	0	1	0
2	DF	(England) ENG	Kyle John	11	0	7	0	0	0	1	0	3	0
3	DF	(England) ENG	Jaheim Headley	17	2	12	2	1	0	1	0	3	0
4	DF	(England) ENG	Jasper Moon	13	0	9	0	1	0	0	0	3	0
5	DF	(England) ENG	Connor Hall	16	0	13	0	1	0	0	0	2	0
6	DF	(England) ENG	Jordan Gabriel	19	2	14	1	1	0	1	0	3	1
7	MF	(Scotland) SCO	George Byers	14	3	11	3	1	0	1	0	1	0
8	MF	(England) ENG	Ben Garrity	10	0	9	0	0	0	0	0	1	0
9	FW	(The Gambia) GAM	Mo Faal	3	0	2	0	0	0	1	0	0	0
10	MF	(England) ENG	Kyle Dempsey	15	2	13	2	0	0	1	0	1	0
11	FW	(Cuba) CUB	Onel Hernández	19	5	14	3	1	1	1	0	3	1
12	DF	(England) ENG	Aaron McGowan	5	1	1	0	1	0	0	0	3	1
14	FW	(England) ENG	Oli Lynch	18	2	14	1	1	1	1	0	2	0
15	DF	(Guyana) GUY	Liam Gordon	6	0	5	0	0	0	1	0	0	0
17	FW	(Saint Kitts and Nevis) SKN	Tyreece Simpson	4	0	4	0	0	0	0	0	0	0
18	MF	(England) ENG	Ryan Croasdale	2	0	1	0	0	0	1	0	0	0
19	FW	(New Zealand) NZL	Ben Waine	8	0	7	0	0	0	1	0	0	0
20	GK	(Slovakia) SVK	Marko Maroši	11	0	8	0	1	0	0	0	2	0
22	DF	(Netherlands) NED	Lewis Montsma	9	1	6	0	1	0	1	0	1	1
23	DF	(England) ENG	Jack Shorrock	0	0	0	0	0	0	0	0	0	0
24	FW	(Honduras) HON	Keyrol Figueroa	8	4	6	2	1	1	0	0	1	1
25	DF	(England) ENG	Cameron Humphreys	17	0	12	0	1	0	1	0	3	0
27	FW	(England) ENG	Maleace Asamoah	8	2	5	0	0	0	0	0	3	2
31	GK	(England) ENG	Keaton Moseley	0	0	0	0	0	0	0	0	0	0
33	MF	(England) ENG	George Hall	18	0	13	0	1	0	1	0	3	0
36	FW	(England) ENG	Max Watters	12	2	8	0	1	1	0	0	3	1
37	MF	(Scotland) SCO	Matthew Craig	3	0	2	0	0	0	0	0	1	0
38	MF	(England) ENG	Rhys Walters	16	0	12	0	1	0	1	0	2	0
42	MF	(England) ENG	Charlie Bussell	5	0	1	0	1	0	0	0	3	0
43	MF	(Spain) ESP	Miracle Orisakwe	0	0	0	0	0	0	0	0	0	0
47	GK	(England) ENG	Theo Morgan	0	0	0	0	0	0	0	0	0	0
Players who featured but departed the club during the season:
13	GK	(England) ENG	Mason Terry	0	0	0	0	0	0	0	0	0	0

=== Top scorers ===
As of match played 21 November 2026

Place	Position	Nation	Number	Name	League Two	FA Cup	EFL Cup	EFL Trophy	Total
1	FW	Cuba	11	Onel Hernández	3	1	0	1	5
2	FW	Honduras	24	Keyrol Figueroa	2	1	0	1	4
3	MF	Scotland	7	George Byers	3	0	0	0	3
4	FW	England	27	Maleace Asamoah	0	0	0	2	2
–	FW	England	10	Kyle Dempsey	2	0	0	0	2
–	DF	England	6	Jordan Gabriel	1	0	0	1	2
–	DF	England	3	Jaheim Headley	2	0	0	0	2
–	FW	England	14	Oli Lynch	1	1	0	0	2
–	FW	England	36	Max Watters	0	1	0	1	2
10	DF	England	12	Aaron McGowan	0	0	0	1	1
–	FW	Netherlands	22	Lewis Montsma	0	0	0	1	1
–	–	–	–	Own goals	1	0	0	0	1
				TOTALS	15	4	0	8	27

=== Disciplinary record ===
As of match played 21 November 2026

Number	Nation	Position	Name	League Two		FA Cup		EFL Cup		EFL Trophy		Total	
Number	Nation	Position	Name	Yellow card	Red card	Yellow card	Red card	Yellow card	Red card	Yellow card	Red card	Yellow card	Red card
11	Cuba	FW	Onel Hernández	2	1	0	0	0	0	0	0	2	1
6	England	DF	Jordan Gabriel	3	0	0	0	1	0	1	0	5	0
10	England	MF	Kyle Dempsey	5	0	0	0	0	0	0	0	5	0
7	Scotland	MF	George Byers	3	0	0	0	0	0	0	0	3	0
8	England	MF	Ben Garrity	3	0	0	0	0	0	0	0	3	0
25	England	DF	Cameron Humphreys	3	0	0	0	0	0	0	0	3	0
33	England	MF	George Hall	3	0	0	0	0	0	0	0	3	0
3	England	DF	Jaheim Headley	1	0	0	0	0	0	1	0	2	0
4	England	DF	Jasper Moon	2	0	0	0	0	0	0	0	2	0
42	England	MF	Charlie Bussell	0	0	0	0	0	0	1	0	1	0
15	Guyana	DF	Liam Gordon	1	0	0	0	0	0	0	0	1	0
12	England	DF	Aaron McGowan	0	0	0	0	0	0	1	0	1	0
22	Netherlands	DF	Lewis Montsma	1	0	0	0	0	0	0	0	1	0
38	England	MF	Rhys Walters	1	0	0	0	0	0	0	0	1	0
			TOTALS	27	1	0	0	1	0	4	0	32	1

Sourced from Soccerway.

== Awards ==
National Awards	Nominated
EFL League Two Manager of the Month	Jon Brady (October 2026)

== Transfers ==
=== Transfers in ===
Date from	Pos.	Nationality	Name	From	Fee	Ref.
19 June 2026	GK	(England)	Jackson Smith	Barnsley	Undisclosed	
1 July 2026 (Note: The transfer was announced on 24 June and would become official on 1 July once his contract at Tottenham Hotspur expired)	CDM	(Scotland)	Matthew Craig	Tottenham Hotspur	Free transfer	
1 July 2026	CM	(England)	Kyle Dempsey	Bolton Wanderers	Free transfer	
1 July 2026 (Note: The transfer was announced on 12 June and would become official on 1 July once his contract at Burton Albion expired)	CB	(England)	Jasper Moon	Burton Albion	Free transfer	
16 July 2026	CF	(England)	Max Watters	Barnsley	Free transfer	
31 July 2026	CB	(England)	Aaron McGowan	Tranmere Rovers	Free transfer	
31 July 2026	CB	(Netherlands)	Lewis Montsma	(Scotland) Dundee	Free transfer	
4 August 2026	CF	(Saint Kitts and Nevis)	Tyreece Simpson	Stevenage	Free transfer	

=== Transfers out ===
Date from	Pos.	Nationality	Name	To	Fee	Ref.
23 June 2026	LM	IRL	Jordan Shipley	Cheltenham Town	Mutual termination	
25 June 2026	CF	IRL	Ruari Paton	(Scotland) St Johnstone	Undisclosed	
30 June 2026	GK	ENG	Ben Amos	Burnley	Released	
30 June 2026	RB	WAL	Mitch Clark	Swindon Town	Released	
30 June 2026	GK	ENG	Arron Davies	(Wales) Cardiff Met	Released	
30 June 2026	CB	ENG	Jesse Debrah		Released	
30 June 2026	CF	JAM	Andre Gray		Released	
30 June 2026	LB	ENG	Sam Hart	Dorking Wanderers	Released	
30 June 2026	CB	ENG	Ben Heneghan	Crawley Town	Released	
30 June 2026	CB	ENG	Ben Lomax	Chester	Released	
30 June 2026	CB	ENG	Tyler Magloire	Buxton	Released	
30 June 2026	CM	BEL	Funso Ojo		Released	
30 June 2026	CM	ENG	Grant Ward		Released	
31 July 2026	CAM	ENG	Rico Richards	Southend United	Undisclosed	
5 August 2026	CF	ENG	Jayden Stockley	AFC Wimbledon	Undisclosed	

=== Loaned in ===
Date from	Pos.	Nationality	Name	From	Date until	Ref.
6 July 2026	GK	ENG	Mason Terry	West Ham United	1 September 2026 (Note: The season-long loan from West Ham United was cut short due to a hand injury.)	
8 July 2026	CF	GAM	Mo Faal	Wrexham	End of Season	
8 July 2026	CF	ENG	Oli Lynch	Luton Town	End of Season	
1 September 2026	LW	ENG	Maleace Asamoah	Wigan Athletic	End of Season	
1 September 2026	CF	HON	Keyrol Figueroa	Liverpool	End of Season	

=== Loaned out ===
Date from	Pos.	Nationality	Name	To	Date until	Ref.
28 July 2026	LWB	ENG	Jack Shorrock	(Republic of Ireland) Sligo Rovers	30 October 2026	
24 August 2026	CF	ENG	Eddie Lake	Stourbridge	24 September 2026	
24 August 2026	CF	ENG	Clayton Malbon	Kidsgrove Athletic		
24 August 2026	CF	ESP	Miracle Orisakwe	Southport	24 September 2026	
24 August 2026	CB	ENG	Joe Williams	Bradford (Park Avenue)	9 September 2026	
5 September 2026	GK	ENG	Keaton Moseley	Kidsgrove Athletic		
9 September 2026	CB	ENG	Joe Williams	Lower Breck		
27 October 2026	CF	SKN	Tyreece Simpson	Southend United	10 January 2027	
30 October 2026	CF	ENG	Eddie Lake	Dudley Town		
