= Dilan Markanday =

English footballer (born 2001)

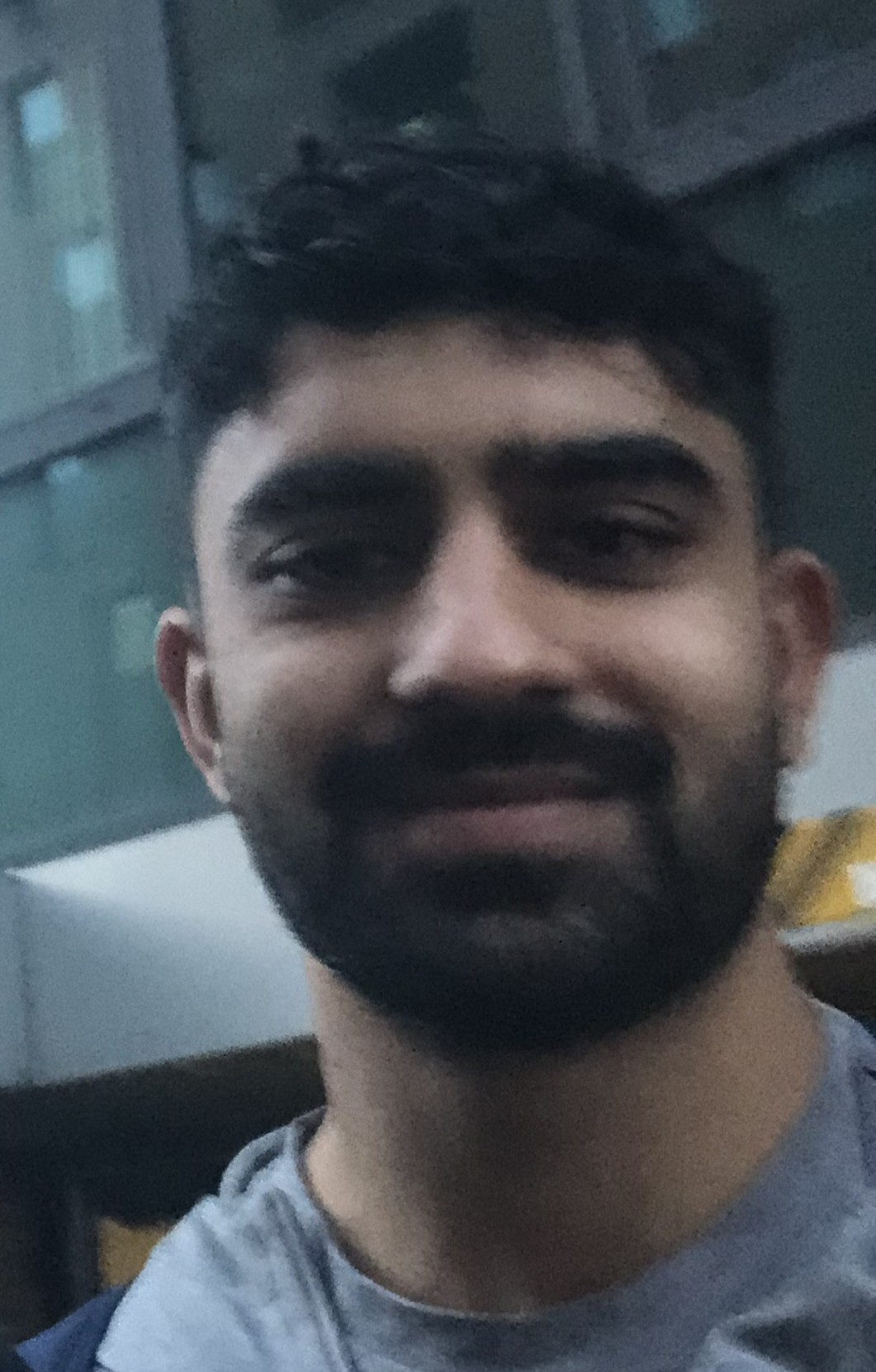
- Markanday in 2025

Personal information
- Full name: Dilan Kumar Markanday
- Date of birth: 20 August 2001 (age 25)
- Place of birth: Barnet, England
- Height: 1.67 m (5 ft 6 in)
- Position: Right winger

Team information
- Current team: Chesterfield
- Number: 24

Youth career
- 2012–2021: Tottenham Hotspur

Senior career*
Years	Team	Apps	(Gls)
2021–2022	Tottenham Hotspur	0	(0)
2022–2025	Blackburn Rovers	24	(1)
2023	→ Aberdeen (loan)	3	(0)
2024–2025	→ Chesterfield (loan)	22	(6)
2025	→ Leyton Orient (loan)	16	(3)
2025–	Chesterfield	54	(13)
- * Club domestic league appearances and goals as of 21 November 2026

Dilan Kumar Markanday (born 20 August 2001) is an English professional footballer who plays as a right winger for EFL League Two club Chesterfield.

== Career ==
=== Tottenham Hotspur ===
Markanday joined the youth academy of Tottenham Hotspur in 2012. On 19 January 2021, he extended his contract with the club until June 2022. He made his professional debut on 21 October 2021, in a 1–0 UEFA Europa Conference League away defeat against Vitesse. In doing so, he became the first British Asian, as well as the first player of Indian descent, to appear for Tottenham's men's first team in a competitive match.

=== Blackburn Rovers ===
On 18 January 2022, EFL Championship club Blackburn Rovers announced the signing of Markanday on a three-and-a-half-year deal, with an option to extend for twelve months. He scored his first goal for the club on 10 August 2022 in a 4–0 EFL Cup win over Hartlepool United.

On 31 January 2023, Markanday joined Scottish Premiership club Aberdeen on a loan deal until the end of the season.

Markanday scored his first goal in English League football and also Blackburn's first goal of the season in the 20th minute of their 2–1 win over West Bromwich Albion on 5 August 2023.

On 15 August 2024, Markanday joined League Two club Chesterfield on a season-long loan deal. On 16 January 2025, he was recalled and loaned out to League One side Leyton Orient until the end of the season.

On 19 May 2025, it was announced Markanday will be leaving the club upon the expiration of his current contract.

=== Chesterfield ===
On 17 June 2025, Chesterfield announced he had signed a 3 year deal with them.

== Personal life ==
Markanday was born in Barnet, Greater London to Deepa and Arun Markanday. He is of Indian descent. He idolises former Manchester United player Ryan Giggs. He attended the Haberdashers' Boys' School in Elstree.

== Career statistics ==
As of match played 21 November 2026

Appearances and goals by club, season and competition
Club	Season	League			National Cup		League Cup		Continental		Other		Total	
Club	Season	Division	Apps	Goals	Apps	Goals	Apps	Goals	Apps	Goals	Apps	Goals	Apps	Goals
Tottenham Hotspur	2021–22	Premier League	0	0	0	0	0	0	1 (Note: Appearance in UEFA Conference League)	0	—		1	0
Blackburn Rovers	2021–22	EFL Championship	2	0	0	0	0	0	—		—		2	0
Blackburn Rovers	2022–23	EFL Championship	1	0	1	0	4	2	—		—		6	2
Blackburn Rovers	2023–24	EFL Championship	21	1	2	0	4	2	—		—		27	3
Blackburn Rovers	2024–25	EFL Championship	0	0	0	0	0	0	—		—		0	0
Blackburn Rovers	Total		24	1	3	0	8	4	0	0	0	0	35	5
Aberdeen (loan)	2022–23	Scottish Premiership	3	0	0	0	0	0	—		—		3	0
Chesterfield (loan)	2024–25	EFL League Two	22	6	0	0	—		—		2 (Note: Appearance(s) in EFL Trophy)	1	24	7
Leyton Orient (loan)	2024–25	EFL League One	16	3	0	0	—		—		1 (Note: Appearance in play-offs)	0	17	3
Chesterfield	2025–26	EFL League Two	38	8	2	0	1	0	—		5 (Note: Three appearances in EFL Trophy, two appearances in play-offs)	0	46	8
Chesterfield	2026–27	EFL League Two	16	5	1	0	1	0	—		1	0	19	5
Chesterfield	Total		54	13	3	0	2	0	0	0	6	0	65	13
Career total			119	23	6	0	10	4	1	0	9	1	145	28
