= Onel Hernández =

Cuban footballer (born 1993)

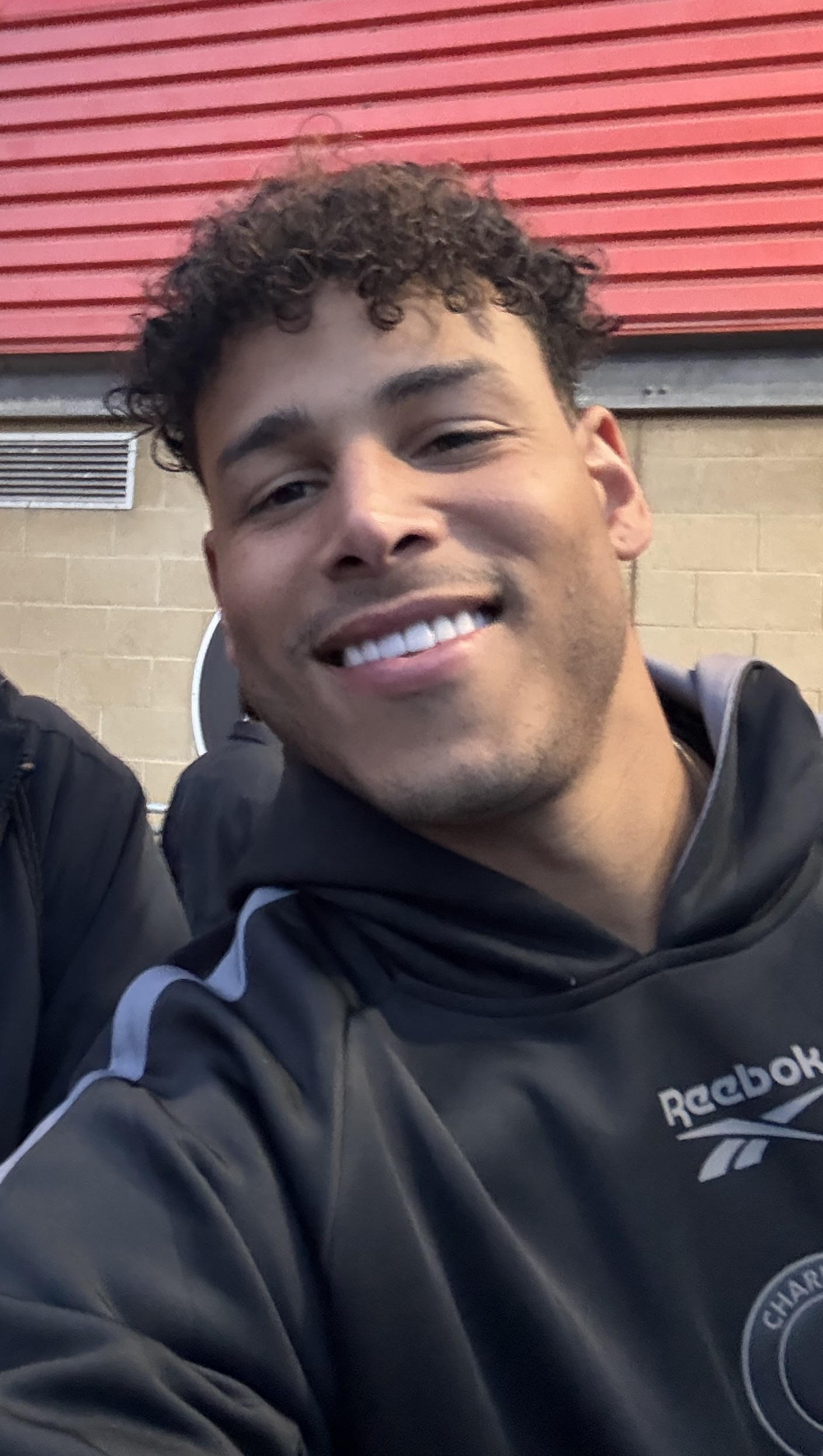
- Hernández with Charlton Athletic in 2025

Personal information
- Full name: Onel Lázaro Hernández Mayea
- Date of birth: 1 February 1993 (age 33)
- Place of birth: Morón, Cuba
- Height: 5 ft 8 in (1.73 m)
- Position: Left winger

Team information
- Current team: Port Vale
- Number: 11

Youth career
- TuS Westfalia Neuenkirchen
- FC Gütersloh
- –2007: Rot Weiss Ahlen
- 2007–2010: Arminia Bielefeld

Senior career*
Years	Team	Apps	(Gls)
2010	Arminia Bielefeld II	5	(0)
2010–2012	Arminia Bielefeld	28	(0)
2012–2013	Werder Bremen II	45	(4)
2014–2016	VfL Wolfsburg II	53	(7)
2016–2018	Eintracht Braunschweig	51	(6)
2018–2025	Norwich City	191	(11)
2021–2022	→ Middlesbrough (loan)	17	(1)
2022	→ Birmingham City (loan)	22	(3)
2025–2026	Charlton Athletic	6	(0)
2026–	Port Vale	23	(3)

International career^{‡}
2010	Germany U18	1	(0)
2021–	Cuba	15	(4)
- * Club domestic league appearances and goals as of 10:18, 22 November 2026 (UTC) ‡ National team caps and goals as of 18:10, 29 September 2025 (UTC)

Onel Lázaro Hernández Mayea (born 1 February 1993) is a Cuban professional footballer who plays as a left winger for EFL League Two club Port Vale and the Cuba national team.

Born in Cuba, Hernández emigrated to Germany as a child and played in the 2. Bundesliga for Arminia Bielefeld and Eintracht Braunschweig, also turning out in the Regionalliga for Arminia Bielefeld II, Werder Bremen II and VfL Wolfsburg II. He was also capped by the Germany U18 team. In January 2018, he was signed by English club Norwich City for £1.8 million. He played 40 Championship games as Norwich ended the 2018–19 season as champions. He subsequently became the first Cuban to play and score in the Premier League, and though Norwich were relegated, he helped them again win promotion as 2020–21 Championship winners. He spent the 2021–22 campaign back in the Championship on loan at Middlesbrough and Birmingham City. By the time he departed Norwich City in June 2025, he had made 210 club appearances, scoring 15 goals. He spent September 2025 to January 2026 at Charlton Athletic, before joining Port Vale.

== Early and personal life ==
Hernández grew up in Gütersloh after having emigrated from Morón, Cuba to Germany with his mother and sister at the age of six. He had to stay in Cuba with his grandmother for two years before his father agreed to sign a legal document giving his consent for his son to emigrate from Cuba. He was introduced to football by his German stepfather, who was a football coach and believed it would help Hernández integrate better into German society.

Hernández became a fan favourite at Norwich City after a January 2019 interview in which he spoke in praise of catalogue retailer Argos, who gave him a catalogue signed by their CEO as a souvenir. He did a signing event at their Norwich Riverside store the following March. He announced his engagement on Instagram in May 2019. His first child, a daughter, was born in November 2019.

== Club career ==
=== Germany ===
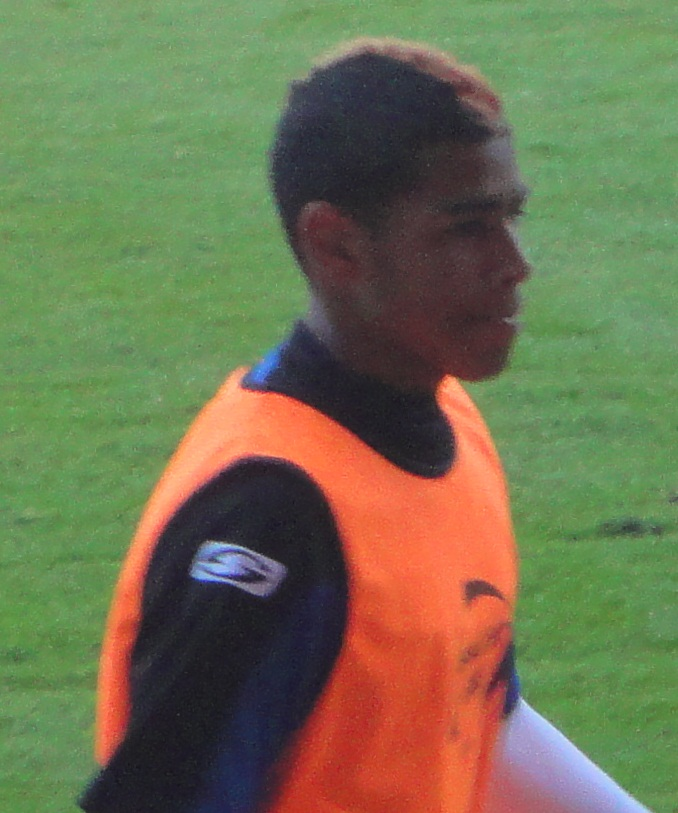
Hernández training with Arminia Bielefeld in 2011

Hernández came through the academy systems at TuS Westfalia Neuenkirchen (where his stepfather was a coach), FC Gütersloh 2000, and Rot Weiss Ahlen before joining the academy at Arminia Bielefeld at the age of 14 in 2007. He made his professional league debut for Arminia Bielefeld in the 2. Bundesliga against SC Paderborn on 1 October 2010. In this game, he was substituted in the 78th minute for Franck Manga Guela by Christian Ziege. He played 28 league games for Arminia Bielefeld from 2010 to 2012. He graduated to the senior team at a difficult time, as they were relegated from 2. Bundesliga into 3. Liga. U19 head coach Jörg Böhme was sacked in May 2011 after leaving Hernández and two others out of an important away game because they had arrived late. Hernández was reinstated by new manager Stefan Krämer. Hernández left Bielefelder Alm after he was released at the end of his contract.

He moved to Werder Bremen II, though left the club after being dropped to the third team for arguing with the coach. On 10 January 2014, Hernández moved to VfL Wolfsburg II. He missed four months of the 2015–16 season due to injury. VfL Wolfsburg II won the divisional title, though lost to SSV Jahn Regensburg in the promotion play-offs. He featured 15 times under Valérien Ismaël, mostly as a substitute.

On 2 June 2016, Hernández signed with 2. Bundesliga club Eintracht Braunschweig for the 2016–17 season. He scored five goals as the club came close to being promoted to the Bundesliga, losing to VfL Wolfsburg in the promotion play-offs. He later stated that manager Torsten Lieberknecht was the only person in Germany who had believed in him and gave him a chance.

=== Norwich City ===
Hernández moved to EFL Championship club Norwich City on 25 January 2018, signing a 3 1/2-year contract under German manager Daniel Farke, with City reported to have paid Eintracht Braunschweig £1.8 million. He made his debut on 3 February in a 1–0 home win over Middlesbrough, as an 86th-minute substitute for Josh Murphy. He finished the 2017–18 season on 12 appearances as the Canaries posted a 14th-place finish.

On 4 August 2018, in the first game of the 2018–19 season, he scored his first goals in a 2–2 draw at Birmingham City. He had patches of good form and was briefly sidelined with a hernia injury, hitting a purple patch with two goals and three assists in December. His two December goals both came in injury-time to secure a 3–3 draw with Nottingham Forest on Boxing Day. He scored a total of nine goals in 43 appearances across the 2018–19 campaign as Norwich won the Championship title and promotion to the Premier League. He subsequently signed a new four-year contract.

On 9 August 2019, Hernández came on as a second-half substitute in Norwich's 4–1 away defeat to Liverpool, becoming the first Cuban to play in the Premier League. He slipped at home the following week, damaging his knee, leaving him out injured with a lateral meniscus tear and raising fears that he had damaged his anterior cruciate ligament (ACL). He was ruled out of action for between three and seven months. He recovered ahead of schedule, and on 27 October he became the first Cuban to score in the league, in a 3–1 loss to Manchester United at Carrow Road. Due to the restricted internet access in Cuba, however, he remained largely unknown in his home country outside of Morón. Norwich were relegated at the end of the 2019–20 season, and he was denied a second Premier League goal after his goal against Manchester City on the final day of the campaign was overturned by VAR, leaving him with one goal in 26 top-flight games. He played 23 times in the 2020–21 Championship title-winning season, with 16 of his appearances coming from off the bench. The team was settled whilst he struggled with injuries.

Hernández joined Championship club Middlesbrough on loan for the 2021–22 season. He scored his first goal for the club in a 2–0 win at Nottingham Forest on 15 September. He was dropped to the bench after Chris Wilder replaced Neil Warnock as manager. Boro signed four new attackers for Wilder to work with and needed to free up space on the wage bill. His loan spell was terminated on 14 January, allowing him to join another Championship club, Birmingham City, on loan until the end of the season. Hernández went straight into Birmingham's starting eleven for the following day's visit to Preston North End and played 83 minutes of the 1–1 draw. A week later, he ran onto a well placed through ball from Lukas Jutkiewicz and "just had to pass it past the keeper" to open the scoring in a 2–1 win over Barnsley. He was a regular for the remainder of the season, used as a wing-back as well as a winger, and scored three goals from 22 appearances. Manager Lee Bowyer said he would "love to get him on a permanent", though was sacked after Birmingham finished 18th in the table.

Hernández returned to Norwich for the 2022–23 season, but was used mainly as a substitute in the first half of the campaign. He came off the bench to score a stoppage-time winner against former club Birmingham in late August, but it was only after David Wagner replaced Dean Smith as manager in January that he became a regular in the starting eleven and repaid Wagner's faith with increased productivity. His second goal of the season came in a 4–2 victory away to Coventry City in late January, he supplied two assists as Norwich beat Hull City 3–1 in February, and his assist for Gabriel Sara in a win against Millwall that took his team into the play-off positions was his fifth. He ended the campaign with two goals in 42 appearances. He signed a new two-year contract, with the option of a further year, in April.

He featured 35 times in the 2023–24 season as Norwich reached the play-offs, where they 4–0 to Leeds United at Elland Road. David Wagner had found himself booed by fans at Carrow Road after taking Hernández off in a defeat to Watford, much to Wagner's chagrin. Hernández missed the end of the season with a broken foot sustained at the end of February.

He played 26 games in the 2024–25 campaign, scoring two goals, to take his overall club tally to 15 goals and 210 appearances. He was dropped from the squad after liking social media posts critical of head coach Johannes Hoff Thorup. On 28 April 2025, Norwich announced that Hernández would be released at the expiration of his contract in June. He said that it was "emotional" to leave the club after seven years, having become so attached to the club as to have the club crest tattooed onto his arm.

=== Charlton Athletic ===
Hernández reportedly had approaches from Spain, Germany, Turkey, Mexico and the United States, and had trained with Sheffield Wednesday, who were under a transfer embargo. On 29 September 2025, he signed a short-term contract with Charlton Athletic until January 2026. He said that "as soon as I had a conversation with Nathan Jones, I knew straight away that it was something I wanted to be a part of". He featured in six Championship games and departed the club on 29 January following the conclusion of his short-term contract. He said he had enjoyed his time at The Valley despite being out of position as a wingback.

=== Port Vale ===
On 9 February 2026, Hernández joined League One bottom club Port Vale on a deal until the end of the 2025–26 season. Manager Jon Brady rested him in early league games as he wanted Hernández to work hard on his fitness in training to be match fit. He made his first start for the club on 16 April, when he provided an assist in a 3–1 victory at Peterborough United. He was the club's strongest player that month, though relegation was confirmed with three games to play. He was released upon the expiry of his contract, though was offered the chance to return to the club to train. He signed a new one-year contract on 8 July.

Manager Brady ceased deploying wingers early in the 2026–27 season, and so Hernández was instead partnered with Max Watters up front. Brady said that "the way that we utilise him is quite special".

== International career ==
Hernández represented Germany once at the under-18 level, in a match against Ukraine in 2010.

In November 2018, Hernández was called up to the Cuba squad for the first time, but could not play due to political rules prohibiting foreign-based players. He said it was a "horrible feeling" to have his call-up rescinded. The Football Association of Cuba went on to change its policy, allowing for him to return to the squad at a later date. In March 2021, he was called up for a second time, and made his international debut in their 2022 FIFA World Cup qualification match against Guatemala. He had to enter the field as a half-time substitute as his flight was delayed and he had a police escort to the match. On his second appearance, he scored his first goal for the country, equalising in a 2–1 loss to Curaçao.

== Style of play ==
Hernández is a dynamic and fast left winger, popular with fans due to his attacking style and infectious personality, though lacking in goals and assists. On the topic of his lack of cutting edge, Norwich manager "if he was world class in that one aspect of his game then he would play for Barcelona and Manchester City and we couldn't afford him". He runs at defenders and stretches the play. He is right-footed and can also play on the right wing or as a quick striker.

== Career statistics ==
=== Club ===
As of match played 21 November 2026

Appearances and goals by club, season and competition
Club	Season	League			National cup (Note: Includes DFB-Pokal, FA Cup)		League cup (Note: Includes EFL Cup)		Other		Total	
Club	Season	Division	Apps	Goals	Apps	Goals	Apps	Goals	Apps	Goals	Apps	Goals
Arminia Bielefeld II	2010–11	Regionalliga West	5	0	—		—		—		5	0
Arminia Bielefeld	2010–11	2. Bundesliga	10	0	0	0	—		—		10	0
Arminia Bielefeld	2011–12	3. Liga	18	0	1	0	—		—		19	0
Arminia Bielefeld	Total		28	0	1	0	—		0	0	29	0
Werder Bremen II	2012–13	Regionalliga Nord	31	0	—		—		—		31	0
Werder Bremen II	2013–14	Regionalliga Nord	14	4	—		—		—		14	4
Werder Bremen II	Total		45	4	—		—		0	0	45	4
VfL Wolfsburg II	2013–14	Regionalliga Nord	9	1	—		—		0	0	9	1
VfL Wolfsburg II	2014–15	Regionalliga Nord	31	4	—		—		—		31	4
VfL Wolfsburg II	2015–16	Regionalliga Nord	13	2	—		—		2 (Note: Appearances in the Regionalliga promotion play-offs)	0	15	2
VfL Wolfsburg II	Total		53	7	—		—		2	0	55	7
Eintracht Braunschweig	2016–17	2. Bundesliga	34	5	0	0	—		2 (Note: Appearances in the 2. Bundesliga promotion play-offs)	0	36	5
Eintracht Braunschweig	2017–18	2. Bundesliga	17	1	1	0	—		—		18	1
Eintracht Braunschweig	Total		51	6	1	0	—		2	0	54	6
Norwich City	2017–18	Championship	12	0	—		—		0	0	12	0
Norwich City	2018–19	Championship	40	8	1	0	2	1	—		43	9
Norwich City	2019–20	Premier League	26	1	3	1	0	0	—		29	2
Norwich City	2020–21	Championship	21	0	1	0	1	0	—		23	0
Norwich City	2021–22	Premier League	0	0	0	0	0	0	—		0	0
Norwich City	2022–23	Championship	39	2	1	0	2	0	—		42	2
Norwich City	2023–24	Championship	30	0	3	0	2	0	0	0	35	0
Norwich City	2024–25	Championship	23	0	1	0	2	2	—		26	2
Norwich City	Total		191	11	10	1	9	3	0	0	210	15
Middlesbrough (loan)	2021–22	Championship	17	1	1	0	—		—		18	1
Birmingham City (loan)	2021–22	Championship	22	3	—		—		—		22	3
Charlton Athletic	2025–26	Championship	6	0	0	0	—		—		6	0
Port Vale	2025–26	League One	9	0	1	0	—		1 (Note: Appearance in the EFL Trophy)	0	11	0
Port Vale	2026–27	League Two	14	3	1	1	1	0	3	1	19	5
Port Vale	Total		23	3	2	1	1	0	4	1	30	5
Career total			441	35	15	2	10	3	8	1	474	41

=== International ===
As of match played 6 June 2025

Appearances and goals by national team and year
National team	Year	Apps	Goals
Cuba	2021	4	2
Cuba	2022	4	1
Cuba	2023	0	0
Cuba	2024	4	1
Cuba	2025	3	0
Total		15	4

Scores and results list Cuba's goal tally first, score column indicates score after each Hernández goal.

List of international goals scored by Onel Hernández
No.	Date	Venue	Opponent	Score	Result	Competition
1	28 March 2021	Estadio Doroteo Guamuch Flores, Guatemala City, Guatemala	Curaçao	1–1	1–2	2022 FIFA World Cup qualification
2	2 June 2021	Estadio Doroteo Guamuch Flores, Guatemala City, Guatemala	British Virgin Islands	2–0	5–0	2022 FIFA World Cup qualification
3	9 June 2022	Warner Park, Basseterre, Saint Kitts and Nevis	Antigua and Barbuda	2–0	2–0	2022–23 CONCACAF Nations League B
4	18 November 2024	Estadio Antonio Maceo, Santiago de Cuba, Cuba	Saint Kitts and Nevis	1–0	4–0	2024–25 CONCACAF Nations League Play-in

== Honours ==
VfL Wolfsburg II

- Regionalliga Nord: 2013–14, 2015–16

Norwich City

- EFL Championship: 2018–19, 2020–21
