= Kiano Dyer =

English footballer (born 2006)

Personal information
- Full name: Kiano Ramone Dyer
- Date of birth: 21 November 2006 (age 19)
- Place of birth: Sutton Coldfield, England
- Height: 1.78 m (5 ft 10 in)
- Position: Central midfielder

Team information
- Current team: Chesterfield (on loan from Chelsea)
- Number: 27

Youth career
- –2021: West Bromwich Albion
- 2021–2024: Chelsea

Senior career*
Years	Team	Apps	(Gls)
2024–	Chelsea	0	(0)
2025–2026	→ Volendam (loan)	3	(0)
2026–	→ Chesterfield (loan)	9	(0)

International career^{‡}
2021–2022	England U16	10	(1)
2022–2023	England U17	13	(0)
2024	England U18	3	(0)
2024–	England U19	14	(0)
2025–	England U20	1	(0)
- * Club domestic league appearances and goals as of 16:00, 1 November 2026 (UTC) ‡ National team caps and goals as of 16:05, 11 October 2025 (UTC)

Kiano Ramone Dyer (born 21 November 2006) is an English footballer who plays as a central midfielder for EFL League Two club Chesterfield, on loan from Premier League club Chelsea.

== Club career ==
Born in Sutton Coldfield, Dyer started his career at West Bromwich Albion, before joining Chelsea in 2021. Dyer was promoted to U18 squad in 2022, he started training with the first team squad in 2023–24 season.

On 12 December 2024, Dyer made his first team debut for Chelsea, coming on as a second-half substitute in their UEFA Conference League tie against Astana in Kazakhstan.

On 3 September 2025, Dyer signed a five-year contract with Chelsea and joined Eredivise club Volendam on loan for a season.

On 4 January 2026, Dyer was recalled from his loan at Volendam due to lack of matches played.

On 2 September 2026, Dyer moved to EFL League Two club Chesterfield on a loan until the end of the season.

== International career ==
Dyer has represented England at under-16 and under-17 level and was a member of the squad that finished fifth at the 2023 UEFA European Under-17 Championship.

On 22 March 2024, Dyer made his England U18 debut during a 2–1 victory over Czech Republic in the U18 Super Cup at Pinatar Arena.

On 7 September 2024, Dyer made his England U19 debut during a 1–1 draw away to Croatia. He was a member of England's squad at the 2025 UEFA European Under-19 Championship.

On 10 October 2025, Dyer made his England U20 debut during a 1–0 defeat to Switzerland at St. George's Park.

== Personal life ==
Kiano Dyer is the son of former footballer Lloyd Dyer, a winger who played for Leicester City and West Bromwich Albion, and who was born in Birmingham, England, of Montserratian descent.

== Career statistics ==
=== Club ===
As of match played 16 December 2025

Appearances and goals by club, season and competition
Club	Season	League			FA Cup		League Cup		Europe		Other		Total	
Club	Season	Division	Apps	Goals	Apps	Goals	Apps	Goals	Apps	Goals	Apps	Goals	Apps	Goals
Chelsea U21	2022–23	—			—		—		—		0	0	0	0
Chelsea U21	2023–24	—			—		—		—		2 (Note: Appearances in EFL Trophy)	0	2	0
Chelsea U21	2024–25	—			—		—		—		3	0	3	0
Chelsea U21	Total		—		—		—		—		5	0	5	0
Chelsea	2024–25	Premier League	0	0	0	0	0	0	1 (Note: Appearances in UEFA Conference League)	0	0	0	1	0
Volendam (loan)	2025–26	Eredivisie	3	0	1	0	—		—		—		4	0
Chesterfield (loan)	2026–27	EFL League Two	0	0	0	0	—		—		0	0	0	0
Career total			3	0	1	0	0	0	1	0	5	0	10	0

== Honours ==
Chelsea U18

- U18 Premier League Southern Champion: 2023–24

Chelsea

- UEFA Conference League: 2024–25

England U18

- 2024 U18 Pinatar Super Cup

Individual

- PL2 Player of the Month: October 2024
