= Mason Terry =

English footballer (born 2004)

Personal information
- Full name: Mason James Terry
- Date of birth: 20 September 2004 (age 22)
- Place of birth: Canvey Island, England
- Height: 6 ft 5 in (1.96 m)
- Position: Goalkeeper

Team information
- Current team: Yeovil Town (on loan from West Ham United)
- Number: 28

Youth career
- 2014–2023: West Ham United

Senior career*
Years	Team	Apps	(Gls)
2023–	West Ham United	0	(0)
2023–2024	→ Concord Rangers (loan)	33	(0)
2024–2024	→ Hornchurch (loan)	44	(0)
2025–2026	→ Braintree Town (loan)	37	(0)
2026	→ Port Vale (loan)	0	(0)
2026–	→ Yeovil Town (loan)	2	(0)
- * Club domestic league appearances and goals as of 22:49, 21 November 2026 (UTC)

Mason James Terry (born 20 September 2004) is an English professional footballer who plays as a goalkeeper for National League club Yeovil Town on loan from EFL Championship club West Ham United.

Terry turned professional at West Ham United in 2023, having won the U18 Premier League South and FA Youth Cup in 2022–23. He had loan spells in non-League football with Concord Rangers, Hornchurch and Braintree Town, winning the Player of the Season award at each of these clubs. He was briefly loaned to Port Vale, though was unable to play due to injury.

== Career ==
Terry joined the Academy at West Ham United as a nine-year-old after being scouted playing for Sunday league side Essex Allstars. He had previously won a tournament in the Netherlands with the Pro Academy of Football. He had interest from Chelsea, Arsenal and Tottenham Hotspur, though the interest cooled after he broke his arm. He played all six games of the Hammers' FA Youth Cup winning campaign in 2022–23. He also lifted the U18 Premier League South title and signed his first professional contract in June 2023. He was moved from Kevin Keen's U18 squad to Mark Robson's U23 squad.

He was loaned to Concord Rangers for the 2023–24 season, and though the club were relegated from the Isthmian League Premier Division, he was named as Supporters' Player of the Season. He moved on loan to National League South club Hornchurch on loan for the 2024–25 campaign, helping Daryl McMahon's newly promoted Urchins to a ninth-place finish. He kept 17 clean sheets in 53 games and was named as the club's Player of the Season. He signed a contract extension in March to keep him at the London Stadium until 2027. He played for Hornchurch in the final of the Essex Senior Cup, which ended in a penalty shootout defeat to his hometown club Canvey Island.

He stepped up another level to the National League with Braintree Town for the 2025–26 season. He kept 12 clean sheets and earned 16 player of the match awards during his 41 appearances for the Iron, who were relegated. He also scored against Truro City in the National League Cup, and notched an assist against Morecambe. The goal against Truro was a stoppage-time equaliser in the competition's quarter-finals. However, Braintree lost the subsequent penalty shootout. The assist against Morecambe also came from him going up the pitch as the team pushed for an equaliser, with Terry putting in a cross for Lewis Walker to score from and gain a point. He joked that such excursions had nearly caused him a serious injury. He came close to switching loans to a English Football League club in the January transfer window, but remained at Cressing Road. He spent two months out injured with a broken wrist. He won a third consecutive Supporters' Player of the Season award. He returned to West Ham, keeping goal for the U21s as they won the HKFC Soccer Sevens.

On 7 July 2026, he joined League Two club Port Vale on loan for the 2025–26 season. He was to compete with Jackson Smith for a first-team place. The loan was terminated on 1 September after Terry sustained a hand injury during training. On 13 November 2026, Terry joined National League club Yeovil Town on a one-month loan deal.

== Career statistics ==
As of match played 21 November 2026

Appearances and goals by club, season and competition
Club	Season	League			FA Cup		EFL Cup		Other		Total	
Club	Season	Division	Apps	Goals	Apps	Goals	Apps	Goals	Apps	Goals	Apps	Goals
West Ham United	2023–24	Premier League	0	0	0	0	0	0	0	0	0	0
West Ham United	2024–25	Premier League	0	0	0	0	0	0	0	0	0	0
West Ham United	2025–26	Premier League	0	0	0	0	0	0	0	0	0	0
West Ham United	2026–27	Championship	0	0	0	0	0	0	—		0	0
West Ham United	Total		0	0	0	0	0	0	0	0	0	0
Concord Rangers (loan)	2023–24	Isthmian League; Premier Division	33	0	2	0	—		3 (Note: 2 appearances in Essex Senior Cup, 1 appearance in FA Trophy)	0	41	0
Hornchurch (loan)	2024–25	National League South	44	0	2	0	—		3 (Note: Appearance(s) in Essex Senior Cup)	0	49	0
Braintree Town (loan)	2025–26	National League	37	0	0	0	—		3 (Note: Appearance(s) in National League Cup)	1	40	1
Port Vale (loan)	2026–27	League Two	0	0	0	0	0	0	0	0	0	0
Yeovil Town (loan)	2026–27	National League	2	0	0	0	—		0	0	2	0
Career total			116	0	4	0	0	0	9	1	129	1

== Honours ==
Individual

- Concord Rangers Player of the Season: 2023–24
- Hornchurch Player of the Season: 2024–25
- Braintree Town Player of the Season: 2025–26

West Ham United

- U18 Premier League South: 2022–23
- FA Youth Cup: 2022–23

Hornchurch

- Essex Senior Cup runner-up: 2025
