= George McEachran =

English footballer

Personal information
- Full name: George James McEachran
- Date of birth: 30 August 2000 (age 26)
- Place of birth: Oxford, England
- Height: 1.72 m (5 ft 8 in)
- Position: Midfielder

Team information
- Current team: Chesterfield
- Number: 20

Youth career
- 2009–2020: Chelsea

Senior career*
Years	Team	Apps	(Gls)
2020–2022	Chelsea	0	(0)
2020	→ Cambuur (loan)	2	(0)
2020	→ MVV (loan)	3	(0)
2023–2024	Swindon Town	55	(1)
2024–2026	Grimsby Town	79	(2)
2026–	Chesterfield	0	(0)

International career^{‡}
2015–2016	England U16	6	(0)
2016–2017	England U17	19	(3)
2017–2018	England U18	16	(0)
2018–2019	England U19	7	(0)
Medal record
Men's football
Representing England
FIFA U-17 World Cup
Winner	2017 India
UEFA European Under-17 Championship
Runner-up	2017 Croatia
- * Club domestic league appearances and goals as of 15:18, 24 June 2026 (UTC) ‡ National team caps and goals as of 22:36, 4 January 2020 (UTC)

George James McEachran (born 30 August 2000) is an English professional footballer who plays as a midfielder for EFL League Two club Chesterfield.

== Club career ==
=== Chelsea ===
McEachran was an unused substitute for Chelsea in the 2019 UEFA Europa League Final. The following season, he spent a short time on loan at SC Cambuur in the Dutch second division.

In this 2020–21 season, McEachran returned to the Netherlands with MVV Maastricht on a season-long loan. In December 2020, he ended his loan prematurely for 'compelling private reasons'.

=== Swindon Town ===
In February 2023 he signed for Swindon Town. On 2 May 2024, the club announced he would be released in the summer when his contract expired.

=== Grimsby Town ===
On 4 July 2024, McEachran joined fellow League Two side Grimsby Town on a two-year deal. He made his first appearance for the club off the bench in Grimsby's first league match away to Fleetwood Town. McEachran was voted as Grimsby Town's player of the season for the 2024-25 season.

On 19 May 2026, it was announced that McEachran would be released following the expiry of his contract in June after failing to agree new terms.

=== Chesterfield ===
On 24 June 2026, McEachran joined fellow League Two club Chesterfield on a free transfer, signing a two-year deal.

== Personal life ==
He is the younger brother of fellow footballer Josh McEachran.

== International career ==
McEachran was a member of the England U17s side that finished runners-up at the 2017 UEFA European Under-17 Championship - scoring in a 4-0 group stage victory over Ukraine and going on to be named in the team of the tournament. McEachran and that Young Lions squad would go on to better that achievement later that year by winning the 2017 FIFA U-17 World Cup in India.

== Career statistics ==
=== Club ===
As of matches played 15 May 2026

Appearances and goals by club, season and competition
Club	Season	League			National Cup		League Cup		Other		Total	
Club	Season	Division	Apps	Goals	Apps	Goals	Apps	Goals	Apps	Goals	Apps	Goals
Chelsea U23	2018–19	—			—		—		5 (Note: Appearances in EFL Trophy)	0	5	0
Chelsea U23	2019–20	—			—		—		4	0	4	0
Chelsea U23	2020–21	—			—		—		2	0	2	0
Chelsea U23	2021–22	—			—		—		4	0	4	0
Chelsea U23	Total		—		—		—		15	0	15	0
Chelsea	2018–19	Premier League	0	0	0	0	0	0	0	0	0	0
Chelsea	2019–20	Premier League	0	0	0	0	0	0	0	0	0	0
Chelsea	2020–21	Premier League	0	0	0	0	0	0	0	0	0	0
Chelsea	2021–22	Premier League	0	0	0	0	0	0	0	0	0	0
Chelsea	Total		0	0	0	0	0	0	0	0	0	0
Cambuur (loan)	2019–20	Eerste Divisie	2	0	0	0	—		—		2	0
Maastricht (loan)	2020–21	Eerste Divisie	3	0	0	0	—		—		3	0
Swindon Town	2022–23	League Two	16	0	0	0	0	0	—		16	0
Swindon Town	2023–24	League Two	39	1	1	0	0	0	2	0	42	1
Swindon Town	Total		55	1	1	0	0	0	2	0	58	1
Grimsby Town	2024–25	League Two	44	2	0	0	2	0	2	0	48	2
Grimsby Town	2025–26	League Two	35	0	2	0	3	0	3	0	43	0
Grimsby Town	Total		79	2	2	0	5	0	5	0	91	2
Chesterfield	2026–27	League Two	0	0	0	0	0	0	0	0	0	0
Chesterfield	Total		0	0	0	0	0	0	0	0	0	0
Career total			139	3	3	0	5	0	22	0	169	3

== Honours ==
Chelsea

- UEFA Europa League: 2018–19

England U17

- FIFA U-17 World Cup: 2017
- UEFA European Under-17 Championship runner-up: 2017

Individual

- UEFA European Under-17 Championship Team of the Tournament: 2017
- Grimsby Town Player of the Season: 2024–25
