= Oli Lynch =

English footballer (born 2004)

Personal information
- Full name: Oliver David James Lynch
- Date of birth: 2 November 2004 (age 22)
- Place of birth: Milton Keynes, England
- Height: 6 ft 5 in (1.96 m)
- Position: Centre-forward

Team information
- Current team: Port Vale (on loan from Luton Town)
- Number: 14

Youth career
- 2008–2024: Luton Town

Senior career*
Years	Team	Apps	(Gls)
2024–	Luton Town	0	(0)
2024	→ Hitchin Town (loan)	3	(0)
2024–2025	→ Dulwich Hamlet (loan)	13	(0)
2025	→ Hemel Hempstead Town (loan)	17	(8)
2025–2026	→ Tamworth (loan)	43	(12)
2026–	→ Port Vale (loan)	14	(1)
- * Club domestic league appearances and goals as of 10:24, 22 November 2026 (UTC)

Oliver David James Lynch (born 2 November 2004) is an English professional footballer who plays as a centre-forward for EFL League Two club Port Vale, on loan from EFL League One club Luton Town.

Lynch began his career at Luton Town, from where he was loaned out to Hitchin Town, Dulwich Hamlet, Hemel Hempstead Town, Tamworth, and Port Vale.

== Career ==
=== Luton Town ===
Born in Milton Keynes and growing up as a Luton Town fan, Lynch joined the club's youth system at the age of 14. He was a part of Luton's FA Youth Cup run in 2023, with them reaching the fifth round of the competition. Lynch also featured for the Under-21s in the club's first season in the Premier League Cup. He joined Hitchin Town on loan and made his first-team debut in a 1–0 defeat at Coalville Town on 17 February 2024. He played two further Southern League Premier Division Central games for the Canaries.

On 20 September 2024, he joined Dulwich Hamlet of the Isthmian League Premier Division on a one-month loan. The loan at Champion Hill was extended and he ended up playing 15 games for the Hamlet. On 7 January 2025, he joined National League South club Hemel Hempstead Town on loan until the end of the 2024–25 season. He scored a brace on his debut in a 4–1 win over Slough Town. He was voted as the Tudors Player of the Month for January, also winning club Goal of the Month awards in January and March, before he was recalled to Kenilworth Road in April. He signed a new contract with Luton upon his recall after impressing manager Matt Bloomfield.

On 31 July 2025, he joined National League club Tamworth on loan until 31 December. The loan was extended until the end of the 2025–26 season. He became the Lambs top-scorer with 12 goals, helping Tamworth to an 11th-place finish.

On 8 July 2026, Lynch joined League Two club Port Vale on a season-long loan. He scored his first goal in professional football on 1 September, opening the scoring with a headed goal two minutes into a 3–1 defeat at Swindon Town.

== Career statistics ==
As of match played 21 November 2026

Appearances and goals by club, season and competition
Club	Season	League			FA Cup		EFL Cup		Other		Total	
Club	Season	Division	Apps	Goals	Apps	Goals	Apps	Goals	Apps	Goals	Apps	Goals
Luton Town	2023–24	Premier League	0	0	0	0	0	0	—		0	0
Luton Town	2024–25	Championship	0	0	0	0	0	0	—		0	0
Luton Town	2025–26	League One	0	0	0	0	0	0	0	0	0	0
Luton Town	2026–27	League One	0	0	0	0	0	0	0	0	0	0
Luton Town	Total		0	0	0	0	0	0	0	0	0	0
Hitchin Town (loan)	2023–24	Southern League; Premier Division Central	3	0	0	0	—		0	0	3	0
Dulwich Hamlet (loan)	2024–25	Isthmian League; Premier Division	13	0	0	0	—		2 (Note: Appearance(s) in FA Trophy)	0	15	0
Hemel Hempstead Town (loan)	2024–25	National League South	17	8	0	0	—		1 (Note: Appearance(s) in Herts Senior Cup)	3	18	11
Tamworth (loan)	2025–26	National League	43	12	1	0	—		8 (Note: 6 appearances and 4 goals in National League Cup, 2 appearances in FA Trophy)	4	52	16
Port Vale (loan)	2026–27	League Two	14	1	1	1	1	0	2 (Note: Appearances in EFL Trophy)	0	18	2
Career total			90	21	2	1	1	0	13	7	106	29
