= Connor Cook (footballer, born 2004) =

English footballer (born 2004)

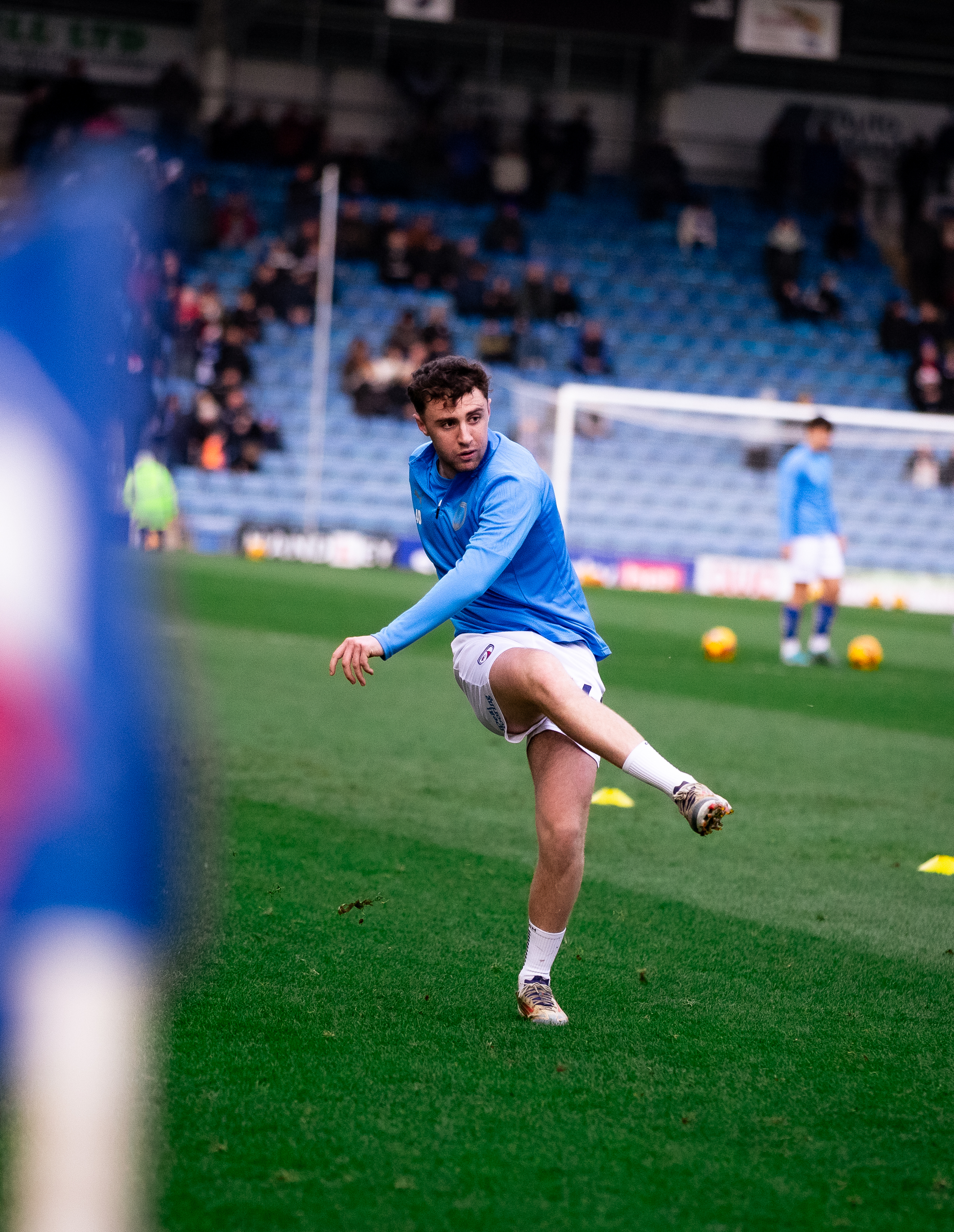
- Cook warming up for Chesterfield ahead of a Sky Bet League Two fixture against A.F.C Wimbledon.

Personal information
- Full name: Connor Paul Cook
- Date of birth: 14 July 2004 (age 22)
- Position: Midfielder

Team information
- Current team: Chesterfield
- Number: 40

Youth career
- 201?–2021: Wigan Athletic
- 2021–2022: Ipswich Town
- 2022–2023: Chesterfield

Senior career*
Years	Team	Apps	(Gls)
2022–	Chesterfield	3	(0)
- * Club domestic league appearances and goals as of 22:34, 26 December 2024 (UTC)

Connor Paul Cook (born 14th July 2004) is an English professional footballer who plays as a midfielder for EFL League Two club Chesterfield. He is also the son of his club's manager Paul Cook.

== Career ==
Cook followed his father Paul Cook around his managerial career at Wigan Athletic, Ipswich Town and then Chesterfield. He scored his first goal in senior football for Chesterfield on 3 September 2024, securing a 1–0 victory at Lincoln City in the EFL Trophy.

== Career statistics ==
As of match played 14 November 2026

Appearances and goals by club, season and competition
Club	Season	League			FA Cup		EFL Cup		Other		Total	
Club	Season	Division	Apps	Goals	Apps	Goals	Apps	Goals	Apps	Goals	Apps	Goals
Chesterfield	2022–23	National League	0	0	0	0	—		1 (Note: Appearance/s in FA Trophy)	0	1	0
Chesterfield	2023–24	National League	1	0	1	0	—		0	0	2	0
Chesterfield	2024–25	EFL League Two	2	0	0	0	0	0	4 (Note: Appearance/s in EFL Trophy)	1	6	1
Chesterfield	2025–26	EFL League Two	0	0	0	0	0	0	3	0	3	0
Chesterfield	2026–27	EFL League Two	0	0	0	0	0	0	2	0	2	0
Chesterfield	Total		3	0	1	0	0	0	10	1	14	1
Career total			3	0	1	0	0	0	10	1	14	1
