= Harrison McGowen Parker =

Founder of Co-operative Society of America (born c.1877)

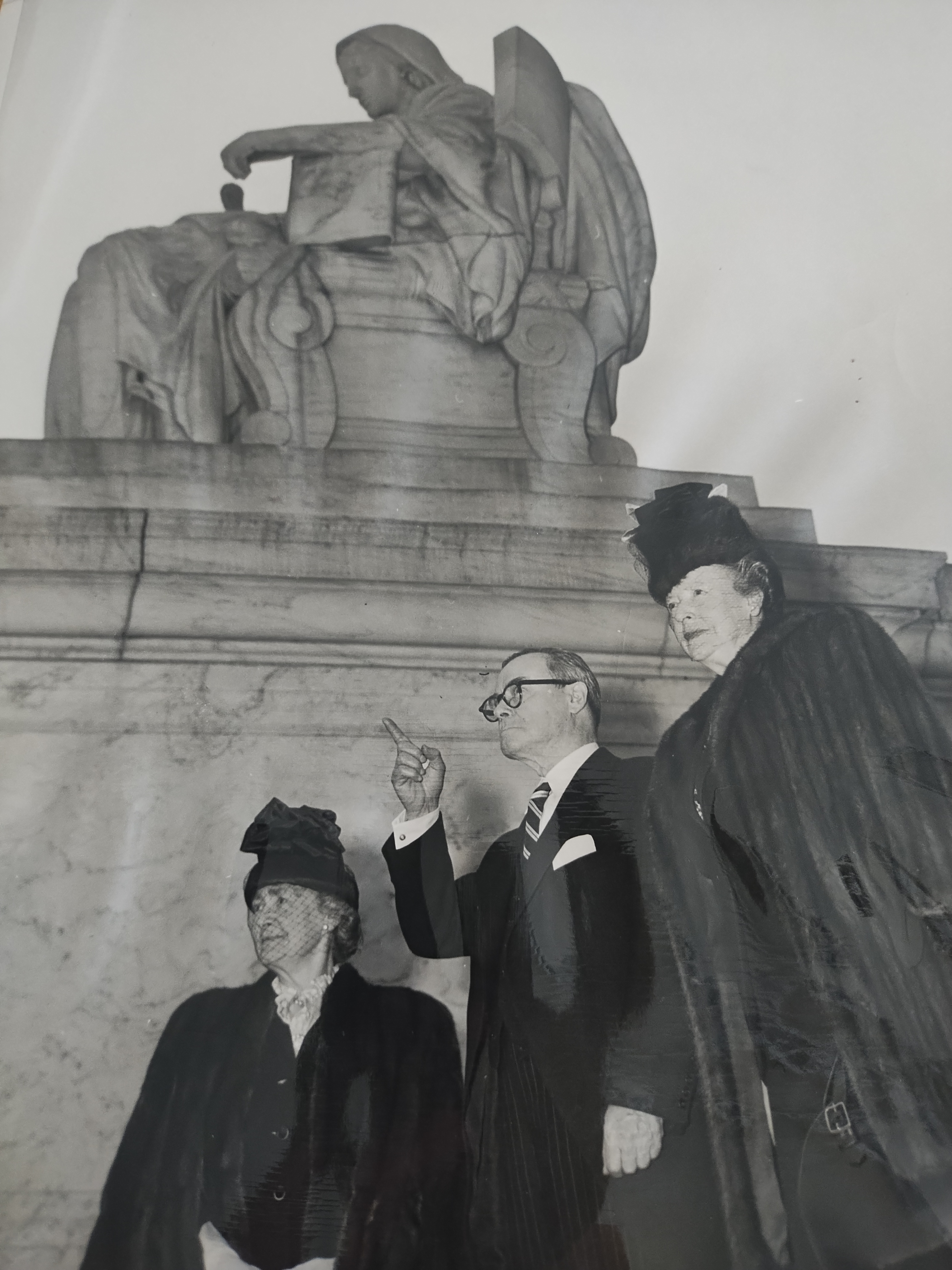
Harrison Parker on the day he argued Parker v. State of Illinois at the Supreme Court in 1948

Harrison McGowen Parker, born c. 1877, was the founder of the Chicago-based Co-operative Society of America. In the 1930s, he sued the Chicago Tribune for libel.

In 1948, he was a pro se petitioner at the US Supreme Court in the case Parker v. State of Illinois. Parker had been charged with contempt of court for submitting letters to a grand jury. The Court affirmed the charge. While serving jail time for contempt, he and his family would be accused of mail fraud for advertising a contest in several newspapers.

In 1960, the Democratic Party included him in a list of anti-Catholic activists opposed to the Kennedy campaign. Anti-Catholic literature from Parker's Puritan Church is archived by the Kennedy Presidential Library.
