= Riverside (Norwich) =

Area in Norwich, Norfolk, England

Coordinates: 52.6255°N 1.3040°E

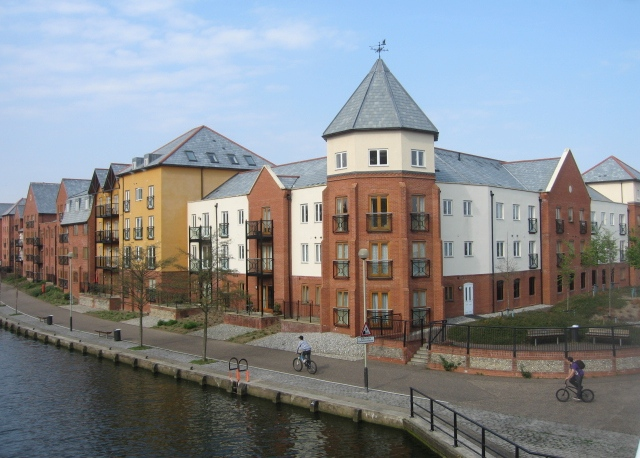
- District: Norwich
- Shire county: Norfolk
- Region: East
- Country: England
- Sovereign state: United Kingdom
- Post town: NORWICH
- Postcode district: NR1
- Dialling code: 01603

Riverside is an area in the city of Norwich, Norfolk, England, along the east bank of the River Wensum. Very close to the city centre, it lies between the river and the Great Eastern Main Line, with Norwich railway station at the northern end and Norwich City's Carrow Road stadium at the southern end.

The area was historically an industrial area with the river being Norwich's link to the coast. Companies such as engineering firm Boulton & Paul developed on the site. The engineering works closed in the late 1980s leaving the site largely derelict. For much of the 1990s it was mainly used as a park and ride car park for Norwich.

In 1994, Norwich City Council, along with private stakeholders, presented the first development plans for the area. The first phases of the redevelopment opened in 1999. This has seen the area developed as a mixed-use site with a combination of leisure, retailing and residential land use. This includes a major supermarket, a multiscreen cinema, a bowling alley and a swimming pool.

== Gallery ==
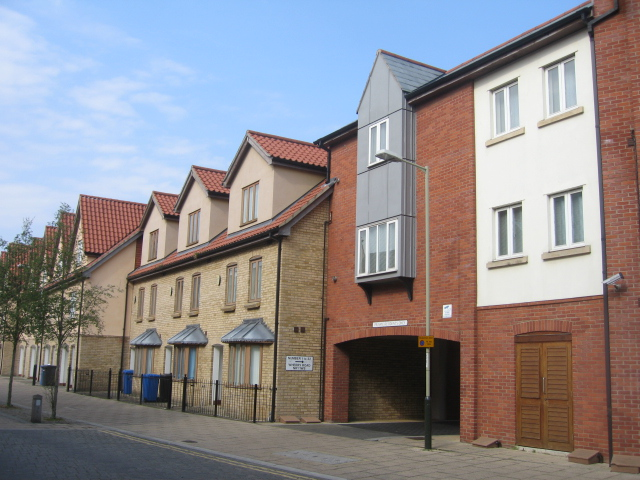
Housing

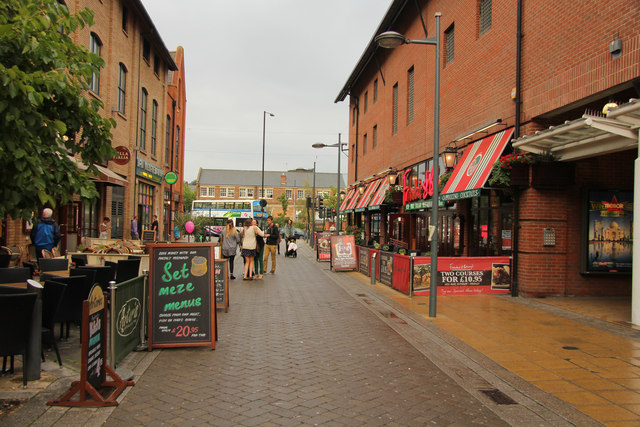
Wherry Road restaurants

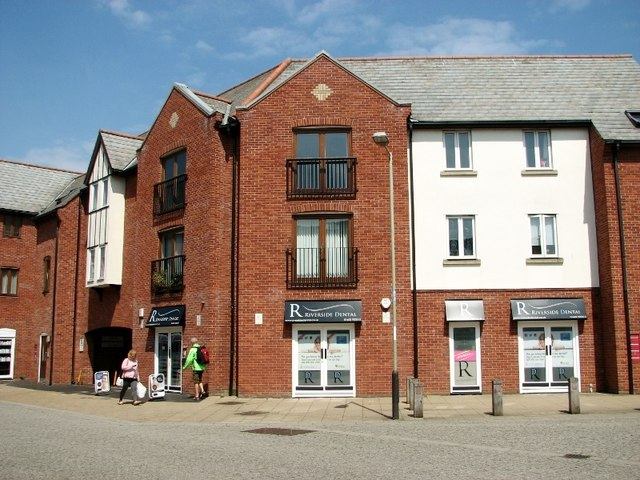
Local dental practice

Lady Julian Bridge facing Riverside

Queen of Iceni pub
