= Louie Marsh =

English footballer (born 2004)

Personal information
- Full name: Louie Joseph Marsh
- Date of birth: 2 July 2004 (age 22)
- Place of birth: Sheffield, England
- Height: 1.76 m (5 ft 9 in)
- Position: Forward

Team information
- Current team: Sheffield Utd
- Number: 34

Youth career
- 2010–2023: Sheffield United

Senior career*
Years	Team	Apps	(Gls)
2023–	Sheffield United	0	(0)
2023–2024	→ Doncaster Rovers (loan)	6	(0)
2025	→ Fleetwood Town (loan)	16	(2)
2026	→ Falkirk (loan)	7	(1)
2026–	→ Chesterfield (loan)	10	(5)

International career^{‡}
2024	England U20	2	(1)
- * Club domestic league appearances and goals as of 28 October 2026 ‡ National team caps and goals as of 21:09, 10 September 2024 (UTC)

Louie Joseph Marsh (born 2 July 2004) is an English professional footballer who plays as a forward for EFL Championship club Sheffield United and the England U20 national team.

== Club career ==
Marsh is a youth product of Sheffield United, and worked his way up their youth categories.

On 4 August 2020, Marsh signed a scholarship contract with the club and in May 2022, he was offered another contract. He scored 24 goals in all competitions during the 2022–23 season including 23 in the Professional Development League, garnering him attention from other clubs.

After a prolific start in the Professional Development League for the 2023–24 season which included scoring two consecutive hat-tricks, Marsh started training with the senior Sheffield United side in August 2023 and appeared on the bench for a couple of Premier League matches. He then made his senior and professional debut with Sheffield United as a substitute in a 0–0 (3–2) EFL Cup loss to Lincoln City on 30 August 2023. He subsequently joined Doncaster Rovers on loan on transfer deadline day.

Marsh scored his first goal for Sheffield United on 13 August 2024 in an EFL Cup tie against Wrexham. Later that season he was loaned to Fleetwood Town and scored his first league goal in a victory over Crewe Alexandra.

In January 2026, Marsh joined Scottish Premiership club Falkirk on loan for the remainder of the 2025–26 season.

== International career ==
In August 2024, Marsh was called up to the England U20 squad to replace an injury. On 6 September 2024, he made his debut as a 90th-minute substitute, in a 1–1 draw against Turkey U20. Four days after his debut Marsh scored his first international goal in a victory over Romania.

== Career statistics ==
As of 16 September 2026

Appearances and goals by club, season and competition
Club	Season	League			FA Cup		League Cup		Other		Total	
Club	Season	Division	Apps	Goals	Apps	Goals	Apps	Goals	Apps	Goals	Apps	Goals
Sheffield United	2023–24	Premier League	0	0	0	0	1	0	—		1	0
Sheffield United	2024–25	Championship	0	0	1	0	2	1	—		3	1
Sheffield United	2025–26	Championship	0	0	0	0	1	0	—		1	0
Sheffield United	Total		0	0	1	0	4	1	0	0	5	1
Doncaster Rovers (loan)	2023–24	League Two	6	0	0	0	0	0	2 (Note: Appearance(s) in the EFL Trophy)	1	8	1
Fleetwood Town (loan)	2024–25	League Two	16	2	0	0	0	0	—		16	2
Falkirk (loan)	2025–26	Scottish Premiership	5	0	2	0	0	0	0	0	2	0
Chesterfield (loan)	2026–27	League Two	3	2	0	0	0	0	1	0	4	2
Career total			26	4	2	0	4	1	3	1	35	6
