= Whittington Moor =

Village in Derbyshire, England

Coordinates: 53.2591°N 1.4284°W

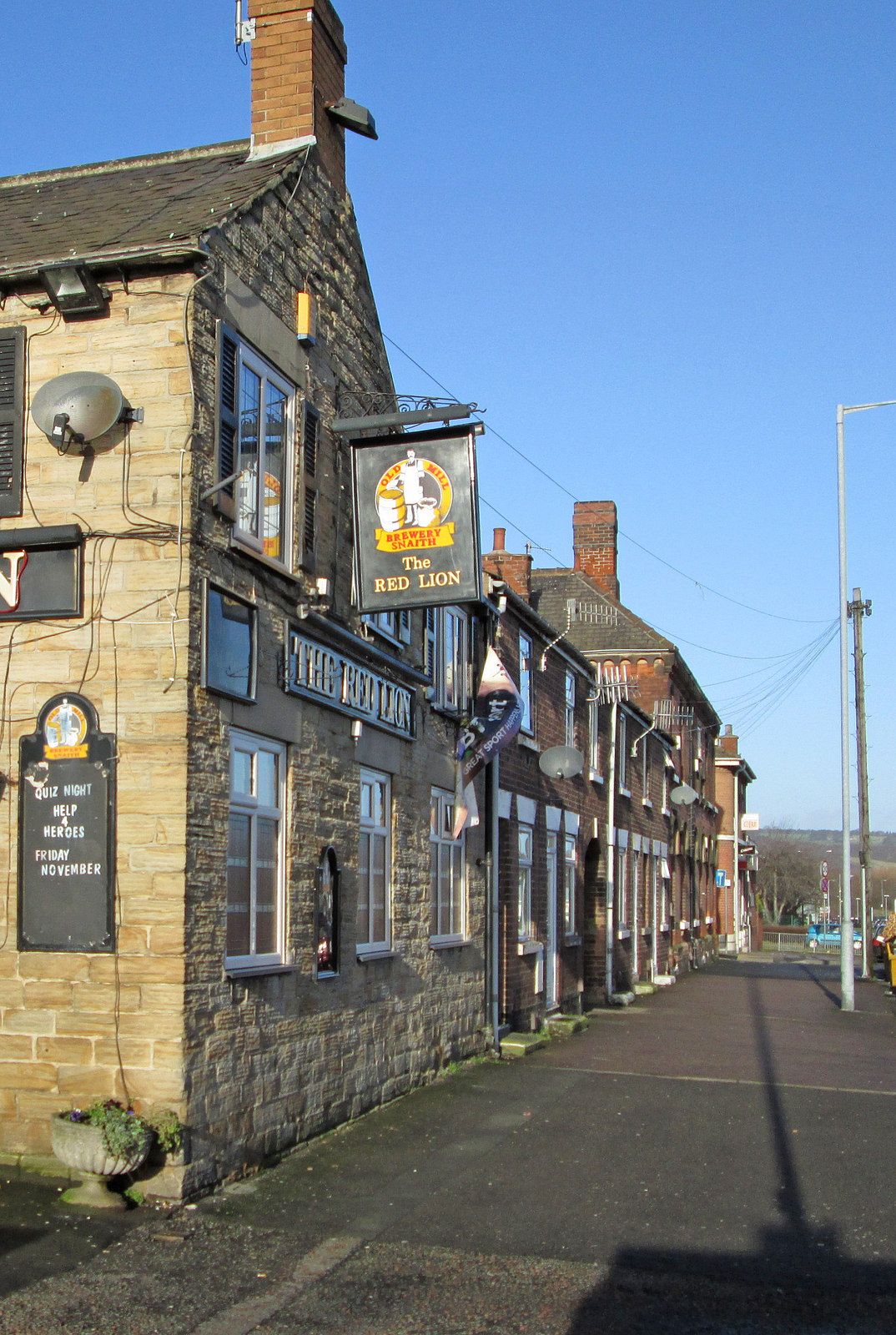

- Location within Derbyshire
- District: Chesterfield
- Shire county: Derbyshire
- Region: East Midlands
- Country: England
- Sovereign state: United Kingdom
- Police: Derbyshire
- Fire: Derbyshire
- Ambulance: East Midlands

Whittington Moor is a village in the Chesterfield district, in Derbyshire, England. It is situated to the north of Chesterfield, and south of Old Whittington, and New Whittington.

SMH Group Stadium, the home ground of Chesterfield F.C. is located in Whittington Moor.
