= 2024–25 Tranmere Rovers F.C. season =

141st season in existence of Tranmere Rovers FC

Tranmere Rovers
2024–25 season
- Owner: Mark Palios
- Chairman: Mark Palios
- Manager: Nigel Adkins (until 25 February); Andy Crosby (interim)
- Stadium: Prenton Park
- League Two: 20th
- FA Cup: First round
- EFL Cup: Second round
- EFL Trophy: Round of 32
- Highest home attendance: 9,486 (26 April 2025 vs. Crewe Alexandra)
- Lowest home attendance: 2,288 (13 August 2024 vs. Accrington Stanley)
- Biggest win: 4-0 (5 April 2025 vs. Chesterfield)
- Biggest defeat: 1-5 (11 January 2025 vs. Walsall)
| Home colours | Away colours | Third colours |

The 2024–25 season was the 141st season in the history of Tranmere Rovers Football Club and their fifth consecutive season in League Two. In addition to the domestic league, the club would also participate in the FA Cup, the EFL Cup, and the EFL Trophy.

== Transfers ==
=== In ===
| Date | Pos. | Player | From | Fee | Ref. |
|---|---|---|---|---|---|
| 20 June 2024 | CF | Josh Davison (ENG) | AFC Wimbledon (ENG) | Undisclosed | |
| 1 July 2024 (Note: The transfer was announced on 4 June, and would become official on July 1 once his Bristol Rovers contract expired) | CM | Sam Finley (ENG) | Bristol Rovers (ENG) | Free | |
| 1 July 2024 (Note: The transfer was announced on 26 June, and would become official on July 1 once his Milton Keynes Dons contract expired) | RB | Cameron Norman (ENG) | Milton Keynes Dons (ENG) | Free | |
| 1 July 2024 | CF | Sol Solomon (ENG) | Marine (ENG) | Free | |
| 1 July 2024 | CM | Josh Williams (WAL) | Connah's Quay Nomads (WAL) | Free | |
| 26 July 2024 | CB | Declan Drysdale (ENG) | Newport County (WAL) | Free | |
| 2 August 2024 | LW | Omari Patrick (ENG) | Sutton United (ENG) | Free | |
| 30 August 2024 | GK | Reuben Egan (IRL) | Athlone Town (IRL) | Free | |

=== Out ===
| Date | Position | Player | To | Fee | Ref |

=== Loaned in ===
| Date | Pos. | Player | From | Date until | Ref. |
|---|---|---|---|---|---|
| 1 August 2024 | CB | Zak Bradshaw (ENG) | Lincoln City (ENG) | End of Season | |
| 30 August 2024 | CM | Saidou Khan (GAM) | Swindon Town (ENG) | End of Season | |
| 31 January 2025 | DM | Jake Garrett (ENG) | Blackburn Rovers (ENG) | End of Season | |
| 4 February 2025 | CB | Louis Jackson (SCO) | Manchester United (ENG) | End of Season | |
| 4 February 2025 | LW | Sam Mather (ENG) | Manchester United (ENG) | End of Season | |

=== Loaned out ===
| Date | Pos. | Player | To | Date until | Ref. |
|---|---|---|---|---|---|
| 1 November 2024 | CM | Josh Williams (WAL) | Southport (ENG) | 30 November 2024 | |
| 26 December 2024 | CM | Josh Williams (WAL) | Southport (ENG) | End of Season (Note: On 28 January, Williams' loan at Southport was extended until the end of season, Three days later, he was recalled back) | |
| 30 December 2024 | CF | Samuel Taylor (ENG) | Oldham Athletic (ENG) | 27 January 2025 | |

=== Released / Out of Contract ===
| Date | Pos. | Player | Subsequent club | Joined date | Ref. |
|---|---|---|---|---|---|
| 30 June 2024 | CM | Reece McAlear (SCO) | Livingston (SCO) | 1 July 2024 | |
| 30 June 2024 | CF | Charlie Jolley (ENG) | AFC Fylde (ENG) | 5 July 2024 | |
| 30 June 2024 | RB | Dan Pike (ENG) | Dundalk (IRL) | 11 July 2024 | |
| 30 June 2024 | CM | Paul Lewis (ENG) | Morecambe (ENG) | 12 July 2024 | |
| 30 June 2024 | CM | Rhys Hughes (WAL) | Connah's Quay Nomads (WAL) | 1 August 2024 | |
| 30 June 2024 | GK | Conor Robson (ENG) | Leek Town (ENG) | 9 August 2024 | |
| 30 June 2024 | CB | Ben Hockenhull (ENG) | Stafford Rangers (ENG) | 10 August 2024 | |
| 30 June 2024 | LB | Mikey Davies (ENG) | Llandudno (WAL) | 15 August 2024 | |
| 30 June 2024 | CB | Jean Belehouan (FRA) | Gateshead (ENG) | 17 August 2024 | |
| 30 June 2024 | CB | Josef Yarney (ENG) | Hilal Al-Quds Club (PLE) | 13 October 2024 | |
| 30 June 2024 | DM | Ousmane Kane (SEN) | KF Bylis (ALB) | 31 January 2025 | |
| 30 June 2024 | RB | Luis Lacey (ENG) | | | |
| 30 June 2024 | RB | Joe Starbuck (ENG) | | | |

== Pre-season and friendlies ==
On 4 June, Rovers announced three pre-season friendlies, against AFC Fylde, Blackpool and Wigan Athletic. A behind closed doors meeting with Blackburn Rovers was also added.

Win Draw Loss Fixtures

| 13 July 2024 Friendly | Blackburn Rovers | 8–3 | Tranmere Rovers | Blackburn |
| TBC BST | Brittain 9'; Dolan 17'; Rankin-Costello 24'; Markanday 65', 82'; Gamble 70'; Vale 91'; Buckley 105' (pen.) | Report | Hawkes; Saunders 112', 120' | Stadium: Blackburn Rovers Senior Training Centre; Attendance: 0 (behind closed doors) |
Note: 2 x 60min matches

| 23 July 2024 Friendly | Preston North End | 0–2 | Tranmere Rovers | Euxton |
| 15:00 GMT | | Report | Davison 2', 15' | Stadium: Preston North End Training Ground; Attendance: 0 (Behind-closed-doors) |

| 27 July 2024 Friendly | AFC Fylde | 3–3 | Tranmere Rovers | Medlar-with-Wesham |
| 15:00 BST | Ustabasi 15'; Haughton 45+2'; Riley 47' | Report | Dennis 59', 76'; Norman 69' | Stadium: Mill Farm Sports Village |

| 30 July 2024 Friendly | Tranmere Rovers | 3–1 | Blackpool | Birkenhead |
| 19:45 BST | Norris 21'; Hendry 25'; Trialist A 89' | Report | Rhodes 85' (pen.) | Stadium: Prenton Park |

| 2 August 2024 Friendly | Tranmere Rovers | 2–1 | Wigan Athletic | Birkenhead |
| 19:45 BST | Norris 24' (pen.); Walker 69' | Report | Hugill 36' | Stadium: Prenton Park |

== Competitions ==
=== League Two ===
==== League table ====
| Pos | Team | Pld | W | D | L | GF | GA | GD | Pts |
|---|---|---|---|---|---|---|---|---|---|
| 18 | Harrogate Town | 46 | 14 | 11 | 21 | 43 | 61 | −18 | 53 |
| 19 | Milton Keynes Dons | 46 | 14 | 10 | 22 | 52 | 66 | −14 | 52 |
| 20 | Tranmere Rovers | 46 | 12 | 15 | 19 | 45 | 65 | −20 | 51 |
| 21 | Accrington Stanley | 46 | 12 | 14 | 20 | 53 | 69 | −16 | 50 |
| 22 | Newport County | 46 | 13 | 10 | 23 | 52 | 76 | −24 | 49 |

Source: EFL Official Website
Rules for classification: 1) Points; 2) Goal difference; 3) Number of goals scored; 4) Head-to-head results; 5) Wins; 6) Away goals; 7) Penalty points (sec 9.5); 8) 12-point sending off offences

==== Results summary ====
| Overall | | | | | | | | Home | | | | | | Away | | | | | |
| Pld | W | D | L | GF | GA | GD | Pts | W | D | L | GF | GA | GD | W | D | L | GF | GA | GD |
|---|---|---|---|---|---|---|---|---|---|---|---|---|---|---|---|---|---|---|---|
| 46 | 12 | 15 | 19 | 45 | 65 | −20 | 51 | 8 | 9 | 6 | 24 | 22 | +2 | 4 | 6 | 13 | 21 | 43 | −22 |

Last updated: 07 Nov 2025.
Source: Soccerway

==== Results by round ====
| Round | 1 | 2 | 3 | 4 | 6 | 7 | 8 | 9 | 10 | 11 | 12 | 13 | 14 | 15 | 17 | 5^{1} | 18 | 19 | 20 | 21 | 23 | 24 | 25 | 26 | 27 | 28 | 29 | 30 | 31 | 16^{2} | 32 | 33 | 22^{3} | 34 | 35 | 36 | 37 | 38 | 39 | 40 | 41 | 42 | 43 | 44 |
|---|---|---|---|---|---|---|---|---|---|---|---|---|---|---|---|---|---|---|---|---|---|---|---|---|---|---|---|---|---|---|---|---|---|---|---|---|---|---|---|---|---|---|---|---|
| Ground | H | A | H | A | A | A | H | H | A | H | A | H | A | H | A | H | H | A | H | A | H | A | H | A | A | H | A | H | A | H | H | A | H | H | A | H | A | A | H | A | H | A | H | A |
| Result | D | D | W | W | L | L | D | D | D | L | W | L | L | W | L | L | D | L | W | L | D | L | W | L | L | D | L | L | L | D | D | L | L | D | D | W | W | D | W | L | W | D | L | D |
| Position | 14 | 17 | 11 | 8 | 14 | 16 | 17 | 17 | 17 | 19 | 16 | 18 | 19 | 17 | 21 | 20 | 21 | 21 | 19 | 19 | 19 | 21 | 20 | 22 | 22 | 22 | 22 | 22 | 22 | 22 | 22 | 22 | 22 | 22 | 22 | 22 | 22 | 22 | 22 | 22 | 21 | 21 | 22 | 22 |
| Points | 1 | 2 | 5 | 8 | 8 | 8 | 9 | 10 | 11 | 11 | 14 | 14 | 14 | 17 | 17 | 17 | 18 | 18 | 21 | 21 | 22 | 22 | 25 | 25 | 25 | 26 | 26 | 26 | 26 | 27 | 28 | 28 | 28 | 29 | 30 | 33 | 36 | 37 | 40 | 40 | 43 | 44 | 44 | 45 |

Source: EFL
A = Away; H = Home; W = Win; D = Draw; L = Loss; P = Postponed
Notes:
- ^{1} Matchday 5 (vs. AFC Wimbledon) was postponed due to international call-ups.
- ^{2} Matchday 16 (vs. Fleetwood Town) was postponed due to international call-ups.
- ^{3} Matchday 22 (vs. Accrington Stanley) was postponed due to foggy conditions.

==== Matches ====
On 26 June, the League Two fixtures were announced.

Win Draw Loss Fixtures

| 10 August 2024 1 | Tranmere Rovers | 0–0 | Notts County | Birkenhead |
| 15:00 BST | Davies (yellow card) 37' | Report | Macari (yellow card) 60' | Stadium: Prenton Park; Attendance: 8,198; Referee: Michael Barlow |

| 17 August 2024 2 | Port Vale | 0–0 | Tranmere Rovers | Stoke-on-Trent |
| 15:00 BST | Heneghan (yellow card) 49'; Curtis (yellow card) 85' | Report | Wood (yellow card) 45+4'; Norman (yellow card) 78'; Walker (yellow card) 90+1'; O’Connor (yellow card) 90+2' | Stadium: Vale Park; Attendance: 8,102; Referee: James Oldham |

| 24 August 2024 3 | Tranmere Rovers | 1–0 | Walsall | Birkenhead |
| 12:30 BST | Patrick 13'; Davison (yellow card) 37'; Turnbull (yellow card) 78' | Report | Matt (penalty missed) 5', (yellow card) 82'; Farquharson (yellow card) 38'; Barrett (yellow card) 60'; McEntee (yellow card) 77' | Stadium: Prenton Park; Attendance: 6,145; Referee: Thomas Parsons |
Note: Fixture was initially scheduled for a 15:00 kick-off, but was moved for live Sky Sports broadcast.

| 31 August 2024 4 | Carlisle United | 1–2 | Tranmere Rovers | Carlisle |
| 15:00 BST | Davies 7'; Jones (yellow card) 45+1'; Ellis (yellow card) 85' | Report | Patrick 6', 37' | Stadium: Brunton Park; Attendance: 8,003; Referee: Simon Mather |

| 14 September 2024 6 | Gillingham | 3–0 | Tranmere Rovers | Gillingham |
| 15:00 GMT | Lapslie (yellow card) 35'; Coleman (yellow card) 37' (yellow-red card) 61'; Little 48'; Hutton (yellow card) 73'; Clarke 82', 89' | Report | | Stadium: Priestfield Stadium; Attendance: 6,660; Referee: Will Finnie |

| 21 September 2024 7 | Colchester United | 3–0 | Tranmere Rovers | Colchester |
| 15:00 GMT | Taylor 7', 38'; Woodyard (yellow card) 58'; Edwards (yellow card) 64'; Tovide 78' | Report | Jennings (yellow card) 14'; Bradshaw (yellow card) 21'; Khan (yellow card) 40'; O'Connor (yellow card) 81' | Stadium: Colchester Community Stadium; Attendance: 4,243; Referee: Matthew Corlett |

| 28 September 2024 8 | Tranmere Rovers | 0–0 | Salford City | Birkenhead |
| 19:45 GMT | Norris (yellow card) 30'; Turnbull (yellow card) 66'; Khan (yellow card) 89' | Report | N'Mai (yellow card) 19'; Tilt (yellow card) 30'; Mnoga (yellow card) 56'; Kouassi (yellow card) 66'; Fornah (yellow card) 67'; Ashley (yellow card) 90+6'; Okoronkwo (yellow card) 90+10' | Stadium: Prenton Park; Attendance: 7,281; Referee: Edward Duckworth |
Note: Fixture was initially scheduled for 29 September, but was brought forward a day.

| 1 October 2024 9 | Tranmere Rovers | 1–1 | Swindon Town | Birkenhead |
| 19:45 GMT | Dennis 17' | Report | King (yellow card) 24'; Merrie 54' (o.g.); Cain (yellow card) 90+2' | Stadium: Prenton Park; Attendance: 5,120; Referee: Seb Stockbridge |

| 5 October 2024 10 | Milton Keynes Dons | 1–1 | Tranmere Rovers | Denbigh |
| 15:00 BST | White 23'; Lemonheigh-Evans (yellow card) 33'; Nemane (yellow card) 59' | Report | Patrick (yellow card) 68'; Hendry 90+1' | Stadium: Stadium MK; Attendance: 6,047; Referee: Craig Hicks |

| 12 October 2024 11 | Tranmere Rovers | 0–2 | Bradford City | Birkenhead |
| 15:00 BST | Morris (yellow card) 62' | Report | Cook 23', 72'; Diabate (yellow card) 39'; Walker (yellow card) 45+1'; Benn (yellow card) 90+5' | Stadium: Prenton Park; Attendance: 8,366; Referee: Sunny Singh Gill |

| 19 October 2024 12 | Bromley | 1–2 | Tranmere Rovers | Bromley |
| 15:00 BST | Olomola (yellow card) 19'; Dennis 90+6' | Report | Finley (yellow card) 18'; McGee (yellow card) 24'; Jennings (yellow card) 28'; Norris (yellow card) 33'; Bradshaw (yellow card) 62'; Patrick 75'; Saunders 80' | Stadium: Hayes Lane; Attendance: 3,376; Referee: Scott Tallis |

| 22 October 2024 13 | Tranmere Rovers | 0–1 | Grimsby Town | Birkenhead |
| 19:45 BST | McGee (yellow card) 24'; O'Connor (yellow card) 73'; Turnbull (yellow card) 80'; Norris (yellow card) 82'; Davies (yellow card) 90+3'; Hendry (yellow card) 90+5' | Report | Rose (penalty missed) 54'; Obikwu 59'; Smith (yellow card) 69'; Warren (yellow card) 76' | Stadium: Prenton Park; Attendance: 5,428; Referee: Ben Toner |

| 26 October 2024 14 | Crewe Alexandra | 3–1 | Tranmere Rovers | Crewe |
| 15:00 BST | Tracey 39', 54'; Cooney (yellow card) 77'; Marschall (yellow card) 82'; Tabiner 84'; Demetriou (yellow card) 90+1' | Report | Jennings 8'; Norman (yellow card) 32'; Bradshaw (yellow card) 41'; Patrick (yellow card) 77' | Stadium: Gresty Road; Attendance: 5,957; Referee: James Durkin |

| 9 November 2024 15 | Tranmere Rovers | 2–1 | Newport County | Birkenhead |
| 15:00 GMT | Norman (yellow card) 11'; Jennings 41'; Morris 58'; Hendry (yellow card) 90+5' | Report | Jameson (yellow card) 27' (yellow-red card) 90+2'; Hudlin 84', (yellow card) 90+3'; Evans (yellow card) 88' | Stadium: Prenton Park; Attendance: 5,805; Referee: Martin Coy |

| 22 November 2024 17 | Cheltenham Town | 1–0 | Tranmere Rovers | Cheltenham |
| 19:45 GMT | Payne (yellow card) 55'; Colwill 89' | Report | O'Connor (yellow card) 48'; Norris (yellow card) 68'; Davies (yellow card) 69' | Stadium: Whaddon Road; Referee: Ruebyn Ricardo |
Note: Fixture was initially scheduled for 29 September, but was brought forward a day.

| 26 November 2024 5 | Tranmere Rovers | 0–2 | AFC Wimbledon | Birkenhead |
| 19:45 GMT | Hawkes (yellow card) 49'; Finley (yellow card) 55'; Davies (yellow card) 73' | Report | Stevens 37'; Bugiel (yellow card) 45+2', (goal) 53' | Stadium: Prenton Park; Attendance: 5,007; Referee: Ollie Yates |
Note: Fixture was originally scheduled for 7 September, but was postponed due to international call-ups in the Wimbledon squad.

| 3 December 2024 18 | Tranmere Rovers | 2–2 | Morecambe | Birkenhead |
| 19:45 GMT | Turnbull 48'; Jennings 75' | Report | Tollitt 12'; Burgoyne (yellow card) 45+1'; Lewis 50'; Tutonda (yellow card) 59'; Williams (yellow card) 76' | Stadium: Prenton Park; Attendance: 4,968; Referee: Oliver Mackey |

| 7 December 2024 19 | Chesterfield | 3–0 | Tranmere Rovers | Chesterfield |
| 15:00 GMT | Colclough 29'; Dobra 44'; Araujo (yellow card) 63'; Sheckleford (yellow card) 77'; Drummond 86' | Report | Drysdale (yellow card) 14'; Finley (yellow card) 88'; Saunders (yellow card) 90+3' | Stadium: SMH Group Stadium; Attendance: 7,923; Referee: Lee Swabey |

| 14 December 2024 20 | Tranmere Rovers | 2–1 | Harrogate Town | Birkenhead |
| 12:30 GMT | Dennis 25', (yellow card) 90+2'; Saunders (yellow card) 63'; Patrick 67' | Report | Daly 14'; Sims (yellow card) 35' | Stadium: Prenton Park; Attendance: 5,122; Referee: Tom Reeves |
Note: Fixture was initially scheduled for a 15:00 kick-off, but was moved for live Sky Sports broadcast.

| 21 December 2024 21 | Doncaster Rovers | 3–1 | Tranmere Rovers | Doncaster |
| 12:30 GMT | Olowu 38'; Bailey (yellow card) 46'; Kelly 66'; Hurst 77' | Report | Wood (yellow card) 17'; Davies (yellow card) 24' (yellow-red card) 54'; Finley (yellow card) 45+1'; Solomon 83' | Stadium: Eco-Power Stadium; Attendance: 7,201; Referee: Alex Chilowicz |
Note: Fixture was initially scheduled for a 15:00 kick-off, but was moved for live Sky Sports broadcast.

| 29 December 2024 23 | Tranmere Rovers | 1–1 | Barrow | Birkenhead |
| 15:00 GMT | Patrick 35' (pen.); Finley (yellow card) 43'; Turnbull (yellow card) 48'; Solomon (yellow card) 53' | Report | Turnbull 11' (o.g.); Vassell (yellow card) 60'; Acquah (yellow card) 75'; Dallas (yellow card) 87'; Gotts (yellow card) 90+1'; Newby (yellow card) 90+7' | Stadium: Prenton Park; Attendance: 6,109; Referee: Aaron Bannister |

| 1 January 2025 24 | Morecambe | 2–0 | Tranmere Rovers | Morecambe |
| 15:00 GMT | White (yellow card) 11'; Songo'o 72'; Stott 84' | Report | Finley (yellow card) 34'; O'Connor (yellow card) 39'; Saunders (yellow card) 69' | Stadium: Mazuma Mobile Stadium; Attendance: 3,577; Referee: John Mulligan |

| 4 January 2025 25 | Tranmere Rovers | 1–0 | Carlisle United | Birkenhead |
| 15:00 GMT | Norman 23'; Patrick (yellow card) 38'; Davies (yellow card) 58'; Jennings (yellow card) 90+3' | Report | Hayden (yellow card) 77' | Stadium: Prenton Park; Attendance: 6,886; Referee: Seb Stockbridge |

| 11 January 2025 26 | Walsall | 5–1 | Tranmere Rovers | Bescot |
| 12:30 GMT | Matt 15', 49'; Stirk 22'; McEntee (yellow card) 29'; Jellis (yellow card) 45+2', (goal) 72'; Lowe 80' | Report | Turnbull (yellow card) 22'; Davies (yellow card) 23'; Finley (yellow card) 29' (yellow-red card) 38'; Dennis (yellow card) 29'; Jennings 44' | Stadium: Bescot Stadium; Attendance: 5,164; Referee: Jeremy Simpson |
Note: Fixture was initially scheduled for a 15:00 kick-off, but was moved for live Sky Sports broadcasting.

| 18 January 2025 27 | AFC Wimbledon | 2–0 | Tranmere Rovers | Wimbledon |
| 15:00 GMT | Neufville 48'; Stevens 81' (pen.) | Report | Khan (yellow card) 35'; Drysdale (yellow card) 59' (yellow-red card) 87' | Stadium: Plough Lane; Attendance: 7,975; Referee: Scott Simpson |

| 25 January 2025 28 | Tranmere Rovers | 1–1 | Gillingham | Birkenhead |
| 15:00 GMT | | | | Stadium: Prenton Park; Attendance: 5,496 |

| 28 January 2025 29 | Swindon Town | 3–1 | Tranmere Rovers | Swindon |
| 19:45 GMT | Smith (yellow card) 22', (goal) 90'; Clarke (yellow card) 36'; Glatzel 87'; Tshimanga 90+5' (pen.) | Report | Davison 7', (yellow card) 53'; Norman (yellow card) 19' (yellow-red card) 62'; Drysdale (yellow card) 22' (yellow-red card) 90+4' | Stadium: County Ground; Attendance: 6,180; Referee: James Bell |

| 1 February 2025 30 | Tranmere Rovers | 1–3 | Colchester United | Birkenhead |
| 15:00 GMT | | | | Stadium: Prenton Park |

| 8 February 2025 31 | Salford City | 2–0 | Tranmere Rovers | Kersal |
| 15:00 GMT | Mnoga (yellow card) 19'; Warrington (yellow card) 27'; Adelakun 51', 61' | Report | Garrett (yellow card) 37'; Davies (yellow card) 45+1' | Stadium: Moor Lane; Attendance: 3,097; Referee: Matthew Corlett |

| 11 February 2025 16 | Tranmere Rovers | 0–0 | Fleetwood Town | Birkenhead |
| 19:45 GMT | Davison (yellow card) 75' | Report | Neal (yellow card) 29'; Sarpong-Wiredu (yellow card) 45'; Lynch (yellow card) 75' | Stadium: Prenton Park; Attendance: 4,621; Referee: Adam Herczeg |
Note: Fixture was originally scheduled for 16 November, but was postponed due to international call-ups.

| 15 February 2025 32 | Tranmere Rovers | 1–1 | Milton Keynes Dons | Birkenhead |
| 15:00 GMT | Norris 79' (pen.) | Report | Orsi 32', (yellow card) 64'; Williams (yellow card) 61'; Patterson (yellow card) 75' | Stadium: Prenton Park; Attendance: 5,699; Referee: Stephen Parkinson |

| 22 February 2025 33 | Notts County | 2-1 | Tranmere Rovers | Nottingham |
| 15:00 GMT | Whitaker 80'; Jatta 83' | Report | Dennis 88' | Stadium: Meadow Lane; Attendance: 9,476; Referee: Jacob Miles |

| 25 February 2025 22 | Tranmere Rovers | 0–1 | Accrington Stanley | Birkenhead |
| 19:45 GMT | | Report | Whalley 49' | Stadium: Prenton Park; Referee: Richard Eley |
Note: Fixture was originally scheduled for 26 December, but was postponed due to foggy conditions.

| 1 March 2025 34 | Tranmere Rovers | 1–1 | Port Vale | Birkenhead |
| 12:30 GMT | Dennis 18'; Wood (yellow card) 59' (yellow-red card) 88'; Patrick (yellow card) 90+2'; McGee (yellow card) 90+7' | Report | Curtis 29'; Hart (yellow card) 58'; Tolaj (yellow card) 89' | Stadium: Prenton Park; Attendance: 6,974; Referee: David Rock |
Note: Fixture was initially scheduled for a 15:00 kick-off, but was moved for live Sky Sports broadcasting.

| 4 March 2025 35 | Grimsby Town | 1–1 | Tranmere Rovers | Cleethorpes |
| 19:45 GMT | McEachran (yellow card) 27'; Rose 68' (pen.) | Report | Finley 10'; Norman (yellow card) 76' | Stadium: Blundell Park; Attendance: 4,854; Referee: Greg Rollason |

| 8 March 2025 36 | Tranmere Rovers | 2–1 | Bromley | Birkenhead |
| 15:00 GMT | Hawkes 32'; Patrick 70'; Saunders (yellow card) 90+2'; McGee (yellow card) 90+6' | Report | Cheek 27'; Webster (yellow card) 90+2'; Kabamba (yellow card) 90+4' | Stadium: Prenton Park; Attendance: 5,615; Referee: Sam Mulhall |

| 15 March 2025 37 | Bradford City | 0–1 | Tranmere Rovers | Bradford |
| 15:00 GMT | Lapslie (yellow card) 6'; Byrne (yellow card) 45+3'; Baldwin (yellow card) 58' | Report | O'Connor (yellow card) 50'; Hawkes 56' (pen.) | Stadium: Valley Parade; Attendance: 18,845; Referee: Thomas Parsons |

| 22 March 2025 38 | Fleetwood Town | 0–0 | Tranmere Rovers | Fleetwood |
| 15:00 GMT | Bolton (yellow card) 50' | Report | Bradshaw (yellow card) 90+2' | Stadium: Highbury Stadium; Attendance: 3,421; Referee: Alex Chilowicz |

| 28 March 2025 39 | Tranmere Rovers | 2–0 | Cheltenham Town | Birkenhead |
| 19:45 GMT | Dennis 25'; Turnbull (yellow card) 30'; Norman 90+3' | Report | Thomas (yellow card) 23'; Williams (yellow card) 36'; Dieng (yellow card) 67' | Stadium: Prenton Park; Attendance: 6,650; Referee: Ross Joyce |
Note: Fixture was initially scheduled for 29 March, but was brought forward a day.

| 1 April 2024 40 | Harrogate Town | 3−2 | Tranmere Rovers | Harrogate |
| 19:45 BST | Taylor 33'; Sims (yellow card) 55'; Cursons 58', (yellow card) 64'; Fox 75' | Report | Turnbull (yellow card) 50'; Hendry 61' (yellow card) 75'; Finley (yellow card) 74'; Patrick 78' | Stadium: Wetherby Road; Attendance: 3,325; Referee: Zac Kennard-Kettle |

| 5 April 2024 41 | Tranmere Rovers | 4–0 | Chesterfield | Birkenhead |
| 12:45 GMT | Norman 46'; Hendry 54'; Davison 85'; Finley 89' | Report | Gordon (yellow card) 20'; Dobra (yellow card) 60'; Fleck (yellow card) 90+2' | Stadium: Prenton Park; Attendance: 6,316; Referee: Tom Reeves |
Note: Fixture was initially scheduled for a 15:00 kick-off, but was brought forward a few hours.

| 12 April 2025 42 | Accrington Stanley | 3–3 | Tranmere Rovers | Accrington |
| 15:00 BST | B. Woods 1', (yellow card) 77'; Walton 24'; J. Woods 42'; Batty (yellow card) 90+5' | Report | Morris (yellow card) 61'; Hendry (yellow card) 77'; Patrick 78', 90+11'; Dennis 87'; Taylor (yellow card) 90+12' | Stadium: Crown Ground; Attendance: 3,197; Referee: Seb Stockbridge |

| 18 April 2025 43 | Tranmere Rovers | 0–3 | Doncaster Rovers | Birkenhead |
| 15:00 BST | Dennis (yellow card) 32' | Report | Molyneux 23', 51', 77'; Clifton (yellow card) 28'; Bailey (yellow card) 55'; Anderson (yellow card) 89' | Stadium: Prenton Park; Attendance: 8,814; Referee: Scott Tallis |

| 21 April 2025 44 | Barrow | 0–0 | Tranmere Rovers | Barrow-in-Furness |
| 15:00 BST | Fletcher (yellow card) 69' | Report | O'Connor (yellow card) 34'; Hendry (yellow card) 60'; Wood (yellow card) 62' | Stadium: Holker Street; Attendance: 3,304; Referee: Thomas Kirk |

| 26 April 2025 45 | Tranmere Rovers | 2–0 | Crewe Alexandra | Birkenhead |
| 15:00 BST | | | | Stadium: Prenton Park |

| 03 May 2025 46 | Newport County | 1-4 | Tranmere Rovers | Newport |
| 15:00 BST | | | | Stadium: Rodney Parade |

=== FA Cup ===
Tranmere Rovers were drawn at home to Oldham Athletic in the first round.

Win Draw Loss Fixtures

| 2 November 2024 First round | Tranmere Rovers | 1–2 | Oldham Athletic | Birkenhead |
| 15:00 GMT | Jennings 9'; Finley (yellow card) 31'; Turnbull (yellow card) 45+2'; Davies (yellow card) 83' | Report | Caprice (yellow card) 23'; Norwood 39'; Uchegbulam 61'; Kitching (yellow card) 81' | Stadium: Prenton Park; Referee: Ross Martin |

=== EFL Cup ===
On 27 June, the draw for the first round was made, with Tranmere being drawn at home against Accrington Stanley. In the second round, they were drawn away to Leicester City.

Win Draw Loss Fixtures

| 13 August 2024 First round | Tranmere Rovers | 3–0 | Accrington Stanley | Birkenhead |
| 19:45 BST | Saunders 3'; Williams 45'; Patrick 71'; Wood (yellow card) 90+1' | Report | Kelly (yellow card) 29'; Whalley (yellow card) 44'; O'Brien (yellow card) 69'; Quirk (yellow card) 72'; Woods (yellow card) 88' | Stadium: Prenton Park; Attendance: 2,288 (88 Away); Referee: Scott Simpson |

| 27 August 2024 Second round | Leicester City | 4–0 | Tranmere Rovers | Leicester |
| 19:45 BST | Ayew 38'; Mavididi 51' (pen.); Ndidi 71'; Winks 90' | Report | Davies (yellow card) 66' | Stadium: King Power Stadium; Attendance: 13,011; Referee: Lewis Smith |

=== EFL Trophy ===
In the group stage, Tranmere were drawn into Northern Group A alongside Accrington Stanley, Stockport County and Everton U21. In the round of 32, Tranmere were drawn away to Rotherham United.

==== Group stage ====
| Pos | Div | Team | Pld | W | PW | PL | L | GF | GA | GD | Pts | Qualification |
|---|---|---|---|---|---|---|---|---|---|---|---|---|
| 1 | L1 | Stockport County | 3 | 2 | 0 | 0 | 1 | 8 | 4 | +4 | 6 | Advance to Round 2 |
| 2 | L2 | Tranmere Rovers | 3 | 2 | 0 | 0 | 1 | 5 | 4 | +1 | 6 | Advance to Round 2 |
| 3 | ACA | Everton U21 | 3 | 1 | 0 | 0 | 2 | 5 | 7 | −2 | 3 | |
| 4 | L2 | Accrington Stanley | 3 | 1 | 0 | 0 | 2 | 4 | 7 | −3 | 3 | |

Source: EFL

Win Draw Loss Fixtures

| 20 August 2024 Group stage | Tranmere Rovers | 1–3 | Everton U21 | Birkenhead |
| 19:00 BST | Davison 11', (yellow card) 72'; Solomon (yellow card) 38' | Report | Whitaker (yellow card) 54'; Beto 86', 90+2'; Sherif 90+5' | Stadium: Prenton Park; Referee: Richie Watkins |

| 8 October 2024 Group stage | Tranmere Rovers | 2–1 | Accrington Stanley | Birkenhead |
| 19:00 BST | Hawkes 49'; Hendry (yellow card) 66'; Taylor 75' | Report | Knowles (penalty missed) 59'; Coyle (yellow card) 63'; Awe (yellow card) 88' (yellow-red card) 90+6'; Popoola 90' | Stadium: Prenton Park; Referee: Zac Kennard-Kettle |

| 12 November 2024 Group stage | Stockport County | 0–2 | Tranmere Rovers | Edgeley |
| 19:00 GMT | Fiorini (yellow card) 90+1' | Report | Dennis 21'; Hawkes 39'; Finley (yellow card) 43'; Bradshaw (yellow card) 50' | Stadium: Edgeley Park; Attendance: 1,236; Referee: Jamie O'Connor |

==== Knockout stages ====
| 10 December 2024 Round of 32 | Rotherham United | 3–2 | Tranmere Rovers | Rotherham |
| 19:00 GMT | Clarke-Harris 24' (pen.); Jules 48'; Nombe (yellow card) 82'; Odoffin 90' | Report | Jennings (yellow card) 47'; Bradshaw (red card) 54'; Dennis 85'; Patrick 90+8' | Stadium: New York Stadium; Attendance: 1,093; Referee: Scott Tallis |

== Statistics ==
=== Appearances and goals ===
As of match played 21 April 2025

Players with no appearances are not included on the list
Italics indicate a loaned in player

| No. | Pos | Nat | Player | Total | | League Two | | FA Cup | | EFL Cup | | EFL Trophy | |
| No. | Pos | Nat | Player | Apps | Goals | Apps | Goals | Apps | Goals | Apps | Goals | Apps | Goals |
|---|---|---|---|---|---|---|---|---|---|---|---|---|---|
| 1 | GK | (England) ENG | Luke McGee | 45 | 0 | 44+0 | 0 | 1+0 | 0 | 0+0 | 0 | 0+0 | 0 |
| 2 | DF | (England) ENG | Cameron Norman | 46 | 3 | 35+5 | 3 | 1+0 | 0 | 2+0 | 0 | 2+1 | 0 |
| 3 | DF | (England) ENG | Zak Bradshaw | 32 | 0 | 11+15 | 0 | 0+0 | 0 | 1+1 | 0 | 4+0 | 0 |
| 4 | MF | (England) ENG | Brad Walker | 12 | 0 | 6+2 | 0 | 0+0 | 0 | 2+0 | 0 | 1+1 | 0 |
| 5 | DF | (England) ENG | Tom Davies | 36 | 0 | 29+3 | 0 | 1+0 | 0 | 1+0 | 0 | 2+0 | 0 |
| 6 | DF | (England) ENG | Jordan Turnbull | 47 | 1 | 42+0 | 1 | 1+0 | 0 | 1+0 | 0 | 2+1 | 0 |
| 7 | MF | (England) ENG | Kieron Morris | 29 | 1 | 18+8 | 1 | 1+0 | 0 | 0+0 | 0 | 0+2 | 0 |
| 8 | MF | (Scotland) SCO | Regan Hendry | 27 | 3 | 18+6 | 3 | 1+0 | 0 | 1+0 | 0 | 0+1 | 0 |
| 9 | FW | (England) ENG | Luke Norris | 16 | 1 | 8+5 | 1 | 1+0 | 0 | 0+1 | 0 | 0+1 | 0 |
| 10 | FW | (England) ENG | Josh Davison | 36 | 3 | 13+17 | 2 | 0+0 | 0 | 1+1 | 0 | 3+1 | 1 |
| 11 | MF | (England) ENG | Josh Hawkes | 24 | 4 | 11+10 | 2 | 0+1 | 0 | 0+0 | 0 | 2+0 | 2 |
| 12 | FW | (England) ENG | Sam Mather | 2 | 0 | 0+2 | 0 | 0+0 | 0 | 0+0 | 0 | 0+0 | 0 |
| 13 | GK | (Republic of Ireland) IRL | Joe Murphy | 6 | 0 | 0+0 | 0 | 0+0 | 0 | 2+0 | 0 | 4+0 | 0 |
| 14 | FW | (England) ENG | Kristian Dennis | 42 | 9 | 20+15 | 7 | 0+1 | 0 | 1+1 | 0 | 2+2 | 2 |
| 15 | MF | (England) ENG | Jake Garrett | 10 | 0 | 5+5 | 0 | 0+0 | 0 | 0+0 | 0 | 0+0 | 0 |
| 16 | MF | (England) ENG | Chris Merrie | 35 | 0 | 23+7 | 0 | 0+0 | 0 | 1+1 | 0 | 3+0 | 0 |
| 17 | MF | (England) ENG | Sam Finley | 37 | 2 | 29+4 | 2 | 1+0 | 0 | 0+0 | 0 | 3+0 | 0 |
| 18 | FW | (England) ENG | Connor Jennings | 47 | 5 | 31+10 | 4 | 1+0 | 1 | 1+1 | 0 | 2+1 | 0 |
| 19 | FW | (England) ENG | Harvey Saunders | 42 | 2 | 15+20 | 1 | 0+1 | 0 | 2+0 | 1 | 2+2 | 0 |
| 20 | FW | (England) ENG | Samuel Taylor | 13 | 1 | 1+9 | 0 | 0+0 | 0 | 0+0 | 0 | 3+0 | 1 |
| 21 | FW | (England) ENG | Sol Solomon | 20 | 2 | 7+7 | 2 | 0+0 | 0 | 1+1 | 0 | 2+2 | 0 |
| 22 | DF | (Republic of Ireland) IRL | Lee O'Connor | 45 | 0 | 37+3 | 0 | 0+0 | 0 | 1+1 | 0 | 2+1 | 0 |
| 23 | DF | (England) ENG | Connor Wood | 38 | 0 | 28+4 | 0 | 1+0 | 0 | 1+1 | 0 | 1+2 | 0 |
| 24 | MF | (Wales) WAL | Josh Williams | 6 | 1 | 0+2 | 0 | 0+0 | 0 | 1+1 | 1 | 2+0 | 0 |
| 28 | MF | (The Gambia) GAM | Saidou Khan | 10 | 0 | 6+4 | 0 | 0+0 | 0 | 0+0 | 0 | 0+0 | 0 |
| 30 | FW | (England) ENG | Omari Patrick | 49 | 12 | 38+6 | 10 | 1+0 | 0 | 2+0 | 1 | 0+2 | 1 |
| 35 | DF | (England) ENG | Declan Drysdale | 10 | 0 | 7+1 | 0 | 0+0 | 0 | 0+0 | 0 | 2+0 | 0 |
