= 2024–25 Accrington Stanley F.C. season =

56th season in existence of Accrington Stanley FC

Accrington Stanley
2024–25 season
- Owner: Andy Holt
- Manager: John Doolan
- Stadium: Crown Ground
- League Two: 21st
- FA Cup: Third round
- EFL Cup: First round
- EFL Trophy: Group stage
- Top goalscorer: League: Shaun Whalley; Ben Woods (9 each); All: Shaun Whalley; Ben Woods; Tyler Walton (9 each)
- Biggest win: 5–0 v. Newport County (H), League Two, 11 March 2025
- Biggest defeat: 0–4 v. Liverpool (A), FA Cup, 11 January 2025; 0–4 v. Bromley, League Two, 6 April 2025

The 2024–25 season was the 56th season in the history of Accrington Stanley Football Club and their second consecutive season in League Two. In addition to the domestic league, the club also participated in the FA Cup, the EFL Cup, and the 2024–25 EFL Trophy.

Accrington secured their stay in League Two with a win at Walsall in the penultimate round of the season. This followed a fightback from being bottom of the league with no wins in the first eight games. The team also won more games on the road than at home, although more points were collected on home turf due to many drawn games. Notably, the season also featured Accrington playing Premier League leaders Liverpool at Anfield in front of 60,261 spectators in the FA Cup third round, with Liverpool winning 4–0.

== Transfers ==
=== In ===
| Date | Pos | Player | From | Fee | Ref |
|---|---|---|---|---|---|
| 1 July 2024 (Note: The transfer was announced on 23 May, and would become official on 1 July once his Milton Keynes Dons contract expired) | GK | Michael Kelly (IRL) | Milton Keynes Dons (ENG) | Free | |
| 1 July 2024 (Note: The transfer was announced on 12 June, and would become official on 1 July once his Boston United contract expired) | CF | Jimmy Knowles (ENG) | Boston United (ENG) | Free | |
| 1 July 2024 (Note: The transfer was announced on 17 May, and would become official on 1 July once his Boston United contract expired) | CF | Kelsey Mooney (ENG) | Boston United (ENG) | Free | |
| 1 July 2024 (Note: The transfer was announced on 23 May, and would become official on 1 July once his Southport contract expired) | RM | Tyler Walton (ENG) | Southport (ENG) | Free | |
| 2 July 2024 | CB | Farrend Rawson (ENG) | Morecambe (ENG) | Free | |
| 23 July 2024 | RB | Donald Love (SCO) | Morecambe (ENG) | Free | |
| 6 August 2024 | LW | Ashley Hunter (ENG) | AFC Fylde (ENG) | Free | |
| 3 January 2025 | CF | Charlie Brown (ENG) | Morecambe (ENG) | Undisclosed | |
| 16 January 2025 | CF | Charlie Caton (WAL) | Chester (ENG) | Undisclosed | |
| 20 January 2025 | CB | Benn Ward (ENG) | Burnley (ENG) | Undisclosed | |
| 31 January 2025 | CB | Devon Matthews (ENG) | Curzon Ashton (ENG) | Undisclosed | |
| 7 February 2025 | CM | Conor Grant (ENG) | Port Vale (ENG) | Free | |

=== Out ===
| Date | Pos. | Player | To | Fee | Ref. |
|---|---|---|---|---|---|
| 14 June 2024 (Note: The transfer was announced on 4 June, and would become official on 14 June once the transfer window re-opened) | LW | Jack Nolan (ENG) | Gillingham (ENG) | Undisclosed | |
| 18 June 2024 | CM | Tommy Leigh (ENG) | Milton Keynes Dons (ENG) | Undisclosed | |

=== Loaned in ===
| Date | Pos. | Player | From | Date until | Ref. |
|---|---|---|---|---|---|
| 4 July 2024 | CB | Zach Awe (ENG) | Southampton (ENG) | 3 February 2025 (Note: On 3 February, Awe was recalled to his parent club Southampton) | |
| 8 August 2024 | LW | Dara Costelloe (IRL) | Burnley (ENG) | 24 January 2025 (Note: On 24 January, Costelloe was recalled to his parent club Burnley) | |
| 16 August 2024 | CM | Nelson Khumbeni (MAW) | Bolton Wanderers (ENG) | 16 January 2025 | |
| 29 August 2024 | LB | Jake Batty (ENG) | Blackburn Rovers (ENG) | End of Season | |
| 30 August 2024 | CB | Sonny Aljofree (ENG) | Manchester United (ENG) | End of Season | |
| 30 August 2024 | GK | Billy Crellin (ENG) | Everton (ENG) | End of Season | |
| 3 February 2025 | CM | Joe O'Brien-Whitmarsh (IRL) | Southampton (ENG) | End of Season | |

=== Loaned out ===
| Date | Pos. | Player | To | Date until | Ref. |
|---|---|---|---|---|---|
| 23 August 2024 | CB | Aaron Pickles (ENG) | Warrington Rylands (ENG) | 21 September 2024 | |
| 30 August 2024 | CM | Charlie Hall (ENG) | Lancaster City (ENG) | 28 September 2024 | |
| 15 November 2024 | CB | Aaron Pickles (ENG) | Farsley Celtic (ENG) | 14 December 2024 | |
| 14 January 2025 | CF | Jimmy Knowles (ENG) | Boston United (ENG) | End of Season | |
| 24 January 2025 | CB | Aaron Pickles (ENG) | Southport (ENG) | 22 February 2025 | |

=== Released / Out of Contract ===
| Date | Pos. | Player | Subsequent club | Join date | Ref. |
|---|---|---|---|---|---|
| 30 June 2024 | LB | Rosaire Longelo (ENG) | Swindon Town (ENG) | 1 July 2024 | |
| 30 June 2024 | CF | Jack Massey (ENG) | Ashton United (ENG) | 1 July 2024 | |
| 30 June 2024 | LM | Sean McConville (ENG) | Clitheroe (ENG) | 1 July 2024 | |
| 30 June 2024 | CM | Joe Pritchard (ENG) | Milton Keynes Dons (ENG) | 1 July 2024 | |
| 30 June 2024 | GK | Toby Savin (ENG) | Shrewsbury Town (ENG) | 1 July 2024 | |
| 30 June 2024 | LB | Bailey Sloane (ENG) | Farsley Celtic (ENG) | 1 July 2024 | |
| 30 June 2024 | CF | Matt Lowe (ENG) | Brackley Town (ENG) | 9 July 2024 | |
| 30 June 2024 | RB | Kelvin Mellor (ENG) | Nantwich Town (ENG) | 2 August 2024 | |
| 30 June 2024 | GK | Jack McIntyre (ENG) | Ayr United (SCO) | 6 September 2024 | |
| 30 June 2024 | GK | Oliver Riva (ENG) | Huddersfield Town (ENG) | 18 September 2024 | |
| 30 June 2024 | CF | Leslie Adekoya (IRL) | Warrington Rylands (ENG) | 2 October 2024 | |
| 30 June 2024 | RW | Korede Adedoyin (NGA) | Raith Rovers (SCO) | 17 October 2024 | |
| 30 June 2024 | CB | Baba Fernandes (GNB) | | | |
| 1 October 2024 | CM | Oliver Patrick (ENG) | | | |

== Pre-season and friendlies ==
On 16 May, Accrington confirmed their first two pre-season friendlies, against Blackburn Rovers and Wigan Athletic. A week later, another two opposition were confirmed for the Reds' pre-season preparations, against Barnsley and Clitheroe. In June a fifth friendly was added, against Lancaster City.

Win Draw Loss Fixtures

| 6 July 2024 Friendly | Accrington Stanley | 1–2 | Blackburn Rovers | Accrington |
| 14:00 BST | Woods 74' | Report | Rankin-Costello 19'; Markanday 60' | Stadium: Crown Ground; Attendance: 3,278 |
Note: 2 x 60min minutes

| 13 July 2024 Friendly | Accrington Stanley | 1–4 | Wigan Athletic | Accrington |
| 14:00 BST | Knowles 60' | Report | Adams 17'; Aasgaard 70' (?); Rankine 73' | Stadium: Crown Ground; Attendance: 963 |
Note: 2 x 60min minutes

| 20 July 2024 Friendly | Accrington Stanley | 0–3 | Barnsley | Accrington |
| 15:00 BST | | Report | Phillips 42'; Marsh 70'; Earl 85' | Stadium: Crown Ground; Attendance: 1,286 |

| 27 July 2024 Friendly | Clitheroe | 3–1 | Accrington Stanley | Clitheroe |
| 15:00 BST | Storey 9'; Splatt 48'; Booth (?) | Report | Hall 28' | Stadium: Shawbridge; Attendance: 866 |

| 30 July 2024 Friendly | Blackpool | 1–3 | Accrington Stanley | Blackpool |
| 13:00 BST | Fletcher 74' | Report | Mooney 32'; Woods 41', 75' | Stadium: Bloomfield Road; Attendance: 0 (Behind-closed-doors) |

| 3 August 2024 Friendly | Lancaster City | 2–1 | Accrington Stanley | Lancaster |
| 15:00 BST | Trialist 19'; Lawson 60' | Report | Walton 12' | Stadium: Giant Axe; Attendance: 290 |

== Competitions ==
=== League Two ===
==== League table ====
| Pos | Team | Pld | W | D | L | GF | GA | GD | Pts | Promotion, qualification or relegation |
|---|---|---|---|---|---|---|---|---|---|---|
| 19 | Milton Keynes Dons | 46 | 14 | 10 | 22 | 52 | 66 | −14 | 52 | |
| 20 | Tranmere Rovers | 46 | 12 | 15 | 19 | 45 | 65 | −20 | 51 | |
| 21 | Accrington Stanley | 46 | 12 | 14 | 20 | 53 | 69 | −16 | 50 | |
| 22 | Newport County | 46 | 13 | 10 | 23 | 52 | 76 | −24 | 49 | |
| 23 | Carlisle United (R) | 46 | 10 | 12 | 24 | 44 | 71 | −27 | 42 | Relegation to National League |

Source: EFL Official Website
Rules for classification: 1) Points; 2) Goal difference; 3) Number of goals scored; 4) Head-to-head results; 5) Wins; 6) Away goals; 7) Penalty points (sec 9.5); 8) 12-point sending off offences
(R) Relegated

==== Results summary ====
| Overall | | | | | | | | Home | | | | | | Away | | | | | |
| Pld | W | D | L | GF | GA | GD | Pts | W | D | L | GF | GA | GD | W | D | L | GF | GA | GD |
|---|---|---|---|---|---|---|---|---|---|---|---|---|---|---|---|---|---|---|---|
| 46 | 12 | 14 | 20 | 53 | 69 | −16 | 50 | 5 | 11 | 7 | 29 | 31 | −2 | 7 | 3 | 13 | 24 | 38 | −14 |

Last updated: 3 May 2025.
Source: Soccerway

==== Results by round ====
| Round | 1 | 2 | 3 | 4 | 5 | 6 | 7 | 9 | 10 | 11 | 12 | 13 | 14 | 15 | 16 | 8^{1} | 18 | 19 | 20 | 21 | 23 | 24 | 25 | 27 | 28 | 29 | 30 | 31 | 17^{2} | 32 | 33 | 22^{3} | 34 | 35 | 36 | 26^{4} | 37 | 38 | 39 | 40 | 41 | 42 | 43 | 44 | 45 | 46 |
|---|---|---|---|---|---|---|---|---|---|---|---|---|---|---|---|---|---|---|---|---|---|---|---|---|---|---|---|---|---|---|---|---|---|---|---|---|---|---|---|---|---|---|---|---|---|---|
| Ground | A | H | A | H | A | H | H | A | H | A | H | A | H | A | H | A | A | H | A | H | A | H | A | H | A | H | A | H | A | A | H | A | A | H | A | H | H | A | H | H | A | H | A | H | A | H |
| Result | L | D | L | D | L | L | D | L | W | W | W | L | D | W | D | D | L | L | D | L | L | W | W | L | W | D | L | D | L | L | L | W | L | W | L | W | D | D | D | L | L | D | W | D | W | L |
| Position | 23 | 19 | 22 | 22 | 23 | 23 | 23 | 24 | 23 | 22 | 19 | 21 | 20 | 18 | 18 | 16 | 20 | 20 | 21 | 22 | 22 | 19 | 19 | 21 | 20 | 20 | 21 | 20 | 20 | 21 | 21 | 20 | 21 | 21 | 21 | 21 | 20 | 20 | 20 | 21 | 22 | 22 | 21 | 21 | 19 | 21 |
| Points | 0 | 1 | 1 | 2 | 2 | 2 | 3 | 3 | 6 | 9 | 12 | 12 | 13 | 16 | 17 | 18 | 18 | 18 | 19 | 19 | 19 | 22 | 25 | 25 | 28 | 29 | 29 | 30 | 30 | 30 | 30 | 33 | 33 | 36 | 36 | 39 | 40 | 41 | 42 | 42 | 42 | 43 | 46 | 47 | 50 | 50 |

Source: Soccerway
A = Away; H = Home; W = Win; D = Draw; L = Loss; P = Postponed
Notes:
- ^{1} Matchday 8 (vs. AFC Wimbledon) was postponed due to a damaged pitch at Plough Lane.
- ^{2} Matchday 17 (vs. Bradford City) was postponed due to a unplayable playing surface.
- ^{3} Matchday 22 (vs. Tranmere Rovers) was postponed due to foggy conditions.
- ^{4} Matchday 26 (vs. Newport County) was postponed due to Accrington's FA Cup involvements.

==== Matches ====
On 26 June, the League Two fixtures were announced.

Win Draw Loss Fixtures

| 10 August 2024 1 | Doncaster Rovers | 4–1 | Accrington Stanley | Doncaster |
| 15:00 BST | Molyneux 43', 62'; Gibson 68'; Sharp 87' | Report | Walton 47'; Knowles (yellow card) 70'; O’Brien (yellow card) 85' | Stadium: Eco-Power Stadium; Attendance: 6,423; Referee: Ross Joyce |

| 17 August 2024 2 | Accrington Stanley | 3–3 | Harrogate Town | Accrington |
| 15:00 BST | O'Brien (yellow card) 5'; Walton 29'; Knowles 60'; Mooney 62' | Report | Daly 16'; Taylor 33'; Folarin (yellow card) 57', (goal) 90+3' | Stadium: Crown Ground; Attendance: 1,905; Referee: Dale Baines |

| 24 August 2024 3 | Newport County | 3–1 | Accrington Stanley | Newport |
| 15:00 BST | Quirk 12' (o.g.); Clarke (yellow card) 29'; Baker-Richardson 52' (pen.); McLoughlin (yellow card) 54'; Wildig 63' | Report | Whalley 38' | Stadium: Rodney Parade; Attendance: 4,437; Referee: Aaron Bannister |

| 31 August 2024 4 | Accrington Stanley | 1–1 | Colchester United | Accrington |
| 15:00 BST | Awe (yellow card) 2'; Mooney 25'; Love (yellow card) 45+1'; Rawson (yellow card) 75'; Walton (yellow card) 84' | Report | Goodliffe 85' | Stadium: Crown Ground; Attendance: 1,956; Referee: Tom Reeves |

| 7 September 2024 5 | Notts County | 2–0 | Accrington Stanley | Nottingham |
| 15:00 BST | McGoldrick 18', 67' | Report | Walton (yellow card) 16'; Awe (yellow card) 19'; Love (yellow card) 45+1'; Batty (yellow card) 63'; Quirk (yellow card) 65'; Whalley (yellow card) 86' | Stadium: Meadow Lane; Attendance: 10,147; Referee: Martin Woods |

| 14 September 2024 6 | Accrington Stanley | 0–1 | Crewe Alexandra | Accrington |
| 15:00 BST | Kelly (yellow card) 90+7' | Report | Lankester (yellow card) 70'; Knight-Lebel (yellow card) 76'; Williams 85' | Stadium: Crown Ground; Attendance: 2,883; Referee: David Rock |

| 21 September 2024 7 | Accrington Stanley | 2–2 | Port Vale | Accrington |
| 12:30 BST | Whalley 29'; Love 43'; Costelloe (yellow card) 55'; Conneely (yellow card) 66'; O'Brien (yellow card) 90+2' | Report | Stockley 90'; Hackford 90+5' | Stadium: Crown Ground; Attendance: 2,628; Referee: Jacob Miles |
Note: Fixture was initially scheduled for a 15:00 kick-off, but was moved for live Sky Sports broadcast.

| 1 October 2024 9 | Cheltenham Town | 2–1 | Accrington Stanley | Cheltenham |
| 19:45 BST | Colwill (yellow card) 19'; Norkett 69'; Bowman 80'; Shipley (yellow card) 88'; Bradbury (yellow card) 90+2' | Report | Batty (yellow card) 30'; Costelloe 39'; Khumbeni (yellow card) 67' | Stadium: Whaddon Road; Attendance: 2,976; Referee: Oliver Mackey |

| 5 October 2024 10 | Accrington Stanley | 2–1 | Morecambe | Accrington |
| 15:00 BST | Costelloe 36' (pen.), 45+1', (yellow card) 74'; Rawson (yellow card) 55'; O'Brien (yellow card) 90+5' | Report | Tollitt 86' | Stadium: Crown Ground; Attendance: 2,462; Referee: Adam Herczeg |

| 12 October 2024 11 | Gillingham | 1–2 | Accrington Stanley | Gillingham |
| 15:00 BST | Little 49', (yellow card) 89' | Report | Woods 60'; Love (yellow card) 66'; Walton (yellow card) 85'; Awe (yellow card) 90'; Costelloe 90+4' | Stadium: Priestfield Stadium; Attendance: 6,622; Referee: Paul Howard |

| 19 October 2024 12 | Accrington Stanley | 1–0 | Barrow | Accrington |
| 12:30 GMT | Whalley 8'; Coyle (yellow card) 30'; Woods (yellow card) 69'; Awe (yellow card) 81'; Henderson (yellow card) 90+3' | Report | Newby (yellow card) 90+4' | Stadium: Crown Ground; Attendance: 2,354; Referee: Charles Breakspear |
Note: Fixture was initially scheduled for a 15:00 kick-off, but was moved for live Sky Sports broadcast.

| 22 October 2024 13 | Milton Keynes Dons | 2–1 | Accrington Stanley | Denbigh |
| 19:45 BST | Gilbey 1', (yellow card) 35'; Tomlinson 58', (yellow card) 72'; Offord (yellow card) 86' | Report | Whalley (yellow card) 43'; Coyle (yellow card) 52'; Woods 67'; Batty (yellow card) 72'; Love (yellow card) 81'; Rawson (yellow card) 82'; Hunter (yellow card) 90+3' | Stadium: Stadium MK; Attendance: 5,084; Referee: Ross Martin |

| 26 October 2024 14 | Accrington Stanley | 0–0 | Walsall | Accrington |
| 15:00 BST | Love (yellow card) 54' | Report | | Stadium: Crown Ground; Attendance: 2,595; Referee: Scott Tallis |

| 9 November 2024 15 | Chesterfield | 0–3 | Accrington Stanley | Chesterfield |
| 15:00 GMT | Oldaker (yellow card) 70'; Naylor (yellow card) 78' | Report | Woods 18'; Aljofree (yellow card) 34'; Coyle (yellow card) 51'; Awe 65'; Knowles 69'; Walton (yellow card) 72' | Stadium: SMH Group Stadium; Attendance: 8,285; Referee: Darren Drysdale |

| 16 November 2024 16 | Accrington Stanley | 2–2 | Swindon Town | Accrington |
| 15:00 GMT | Aljofree 16'; Rawson 30'; Woods (yellow card) 77'; Costelloe (yellow card) 90' | Report | Smith 11'; Butterworth (yellow card) 36', (goal) 69'; McGregor (yellow card) 53'; Glatzel (yellow card) 59'; Delaney (yellow card) 65' | Stadium: Crown Ground; Attendance: 2,755; Referee: Ollie Yates |

| 19 November 2024 8 | AFC Wimbledon | 2–2 | Accrington Stanley | Wimbledon |
| 19:45 BST | Stevens (yellow card) 37'; Tilley (yellow card) 60', (goal) 90+7'; Ball (yellow card) 70'; Smith 89'; Neufville (yellow card) 90+4' | Report | Woods (yellow card) 22'; Rawson (yellow card) 45+1', (red card) 90+9'; Khumbeni 58'; Costelloe 75'; Walton (yellow card) 88'; Hunter (yellow card) 90+9' | Stadium: Plough Lane; Attendance: 7,020; Referee: Ben Atkinson |
Note: Fixture was originally scheduled for 28 September, but was postponed due to a damaged pitch at Plough Lane and no suitable alternative venue being found.

| 3 December 2024 18 | Grimsby Town | 5–2 | Accrington Stanley | Cleethorpes |
| 19:45 GMT | Rodgers 2'; Luker 11'; Obikwu 19'; Davies 33' (pen.); Aljofree 68' (o.g.) | Report | Khumbeni (yellow card) 31'; Love (yellow card) 40'; Aljofree (yellow card) 41'; Henderson 63'; Woods 80'; Hunter (yellow card) 89'; O'Brien (yellow card) 90+4' | Stadium: Blundell Park; Attendance: 3,874; Referee: Scott Simpson |

| 7 December 2024 19 | Accrington Stanley | 1–2 | Bromley | Accrington |
| 15:00 GMT | Woods 9', (yellow card) 75'; Coyle (yellow card) 23' | Report | Cheek 7'; Whitely (yellow card) 51'; Odutayo 63'; Smith (yellow card) 85'; Imray (yellow card) 90+2' | Stadium: Crown Ground; Attendance: 1,816; Referee: Martin Coy |

| 16 December 2024 20 | Fleetwood Town | 1–1 | Accrington Stanley | Fleetwood |
| 20:00 GMT | Bolton (yellow card) 11'; Bennett (yellow card) 45+1'; Broom 52'; Patterson (yellow card) 70' | Report | Aljofree 32', (yellow card) 35'; Walton (yellow card) 87'; Awe (yellow card) 90+2' | Stadium: Highbury Stadium; Referee: Thomas Kirk |
Note: Fixture was initially scheduled for 14 December, but was moved for live Sky Sports broadcast.

| 21 December 2024 21 | Accrington Stanley | 0–2 | Salford City | Accrington |
| 15:00 GMT | Love (yellow card) 39'; Woods (yellow card) 72' | Report | N'Mai (yellow card) 45+1'; Mnoga 48'; Ashley (yellow card) 72'; Young (yellow card) 79'; Stockton 85'; Taylor (yellow card) 90+4' | Stadium: Crown Ground; Attendance: 2,350; Referee: Scott Jackson |

| 29 December 2024 23 | Carlisle United | 2–1 | Accrington Stanley | Carlisle |
| 12:30 GMT | Harris 11'; Sadi (yellow card) 41'; Adu-Adjei (yellow card) 49'; Harper (yellow card) 50'; Armstrong 54'; Breeze (yellow card) 81'; Jones (yellow card) 90+2' | Report | Rawson (yellow card) 29'; Khumbeni (yellow card) 58'; Whalley (yellow card) 66'; Walton (yellow card) 71', (goal) 73'; Hunter (yellow card) 74' | Stadium: Brunton Park; Attendance: 7,130; Referee: Thomas Parsons |
Note: Fixture was initially scheduled for a 15:00 kick-off, but was moved for live Sky Sports broadcast.

| 1 January 2025 24 | Accrington Stanley | 3–2 | Grimsby Town | Accrington |
| 15:00 GMT | Woods 9', 82'; Love (yellow card) 35'; Coyle (yellow card) 44'; Whalley 60' (pen.); Henderson (yellow card) 90' | Report | Green 5'; Khouri 39', (yellow card) 74' | Stadium: Crown Ground; Attendance: 2,675; Referee: Edward Duckworth |

| 4 January 2025 25 | Colchester United | 0–2 | Accrington Stanley | Colchester |
| 15:00 GMT | McDonnell (yellow card) 38'; Donnelly (yellow card) 62'; Read (yellow card) 78'; Bishop (yellow card) 90+1' | Report | Whalley 18' (pen.), 59'; Love (yellow card) 39'; Woods (yellow card) 55' | Stadium: Colchester Community Stadium; Attendance: 4,366; Referee: Jamie O'Connor |

| 18 January 2025 27 | Accrington Stanley | 0–3 | Notts County | Accrington |
| 15:00 GMT | Whalley (yellow card) 3'; Woods (yellow card) 9'; Coyle (yellow card) 35' | Report | Grant (yellow card) 6'; Abbott 16'; McGoldrick 27', 63'; Hinchy (yellow card) 90' | Stadium: Crown Ground; Attendance: 2,924; Referee: Simon Mather |

| 25 January 2025 28 | Crewe Alexandra | 0–1 | Accrington Stanley | Crewe |
| 15:00 GMT | Cooney (yellow card) 31'; Knight-Lebel (yellow card) 33'; Bogle (yellow card) 83' | Report | Whalley 16', (yellow card) 58'; Batty (yellow card) 48'; Hunter (yellow card) 77'; Woods (yellow card) 90+3' | Stadium: Gresty Road; Attendance: 4,965; Referee: Alex Chilowicz |

| 28 January 2024 29 | Accrington Stanley | 0–0 | Cheltenham Town | Accrington |
| 19:45 GMT | | Report | | Stadium: Crown Ground; Attendance: 1,605; Referee: Paul Marsden |

| 1 February 2025 30 | Port Vale | 2–1 | Accrington Stanley | Burslem |
| 15:00 GMT | Stockley 7', (yellow card) 69'; Sang (red card) 13'; Amos (yellow card) 27'; Harper (yellow card) 44'; Tolaj 56' | Report | Batty (yellow card) 22'; Walton 51'; Love (yellow card) 72' | Stadium: Vale Park; Attendance: 6,198; Referee: Adam Herczeg |

| 8 February 2025 31 | Accrington Stanley | 0–0 | AFC Wimbledon | Accrington |
| 15:00 GMT | Matthews (yellow card) 79' | Report | Lewis (yellow card) 17'; Kelly (yellow card) 19'; Bugiel (yellow card) 85' | Stadium: Crown Ground; Attendance: 2,170; Referee: Scott Oldham |

| 11 February 2025 17 | Bradford City | 1–0 | Accrington Stanley | Bradford |
| 19:45 GMT | Pattison 20', (yellow card) 45+6'; Baldwin (yellow card) 27'; Pointon (yellow card) 43'; Smallwood (yellow card) 45+5' | Report | Woods (yellow card) 36' | Stadium: Valley Parade; Attendance: 15,263; Referee: James Oldham |
Note: Fixture was originally scheduled for 23 November, but was postponed due to an unplayable playing surface.

| 15 February 2025 32 | Morecambe | 2–0 | Accrington Stanley | Morecambe |
| 15:00 GMT | Angol 54'; Garner 88' | Report | Walton (yellow card) 43'; Love (yellow card) 60'; Henderson (yellow card) 69' | Stadium: Mazuma Mobile Stadium; Attendance: 3,473; Referee: Andy Davies |

| 22 February 2025 33 | Accrington Stanley | 1–2 | Doncaster Rovers | Accrington |
| 15:00 GMT | Conneely 57' | Report | Clifton 2'; Ward 61' (o.g.) | Stadium: Crown Ground; Attendance: 2,258; Referee: Stuart Morland |

| 25 February 2025 22 | Tranmere Rovers | 0–1 | Accrington Stanley | Birkenhead |
| 19:45 GMT | | | Whalley 49' | Stadium: Prenton Park; Referee: Richard Eley |
Note: Fixture was originally scheduled for 26 December, but was postponed due to foggy conditions.

| 1 March 2025 34 | Harrogate Town | 2–1 | Accrington Stanley | Harrogate |
| 15:00 GMT | Moon 19'; Muldoon (yellow card) 33'; Sims (yellow card) 42'; March 58'; Gibson (yellow card) 88' | Report | Ward (yellow card) 38'; Love (yellow card) 45+4'; Woods 50'; Hunter (yellow card) 68'; Walton (yellow card) 90+2' | Stadium: Wetherby Road; Attendance: 3,015; Referee: Matt Corlett |

| 4 March 2025 35 | Accrington Stanley | 2–0 | Milton Keynes Dons | Accrington |
| 19:45 GMT | Walton 24'; O'Brien-Whitmarsh 39'; Quirk (yellow card) 89' | Report | Patterson (yellow card) 59'; Lawrence (yellow card) 62' | Stadium: Crown Ground; Attendance: 1,596; Referee: Garreth Rhodes |

| 8 March 2025 36 | Barrow | 2–0 | Accrington Stanley | Barrow-in-Furness |
| 15:00 GMT | Duru 14'; Gotts (yellow card) 34'; Pressley 78' | Report | Love (yellow card) 40' | Stadium: Holker Street; Attendance: 3,200; Referee: Declan Bourne |

| 11 March 2025 26 | Accrington Stanley | 5–0 | Newport County | Accrington |
| 19:45 GMT | O'Brien-Whitmarsh 4', 53'; Mooney 15', 75'; Rawson (yellow card) 23'; Walton 26'; Ward (yellow card) 89' | Report | Kamwa (yellow card) 37'; Spellman (yellow card) 46' | Stadium: Crown Ground; Attendance: 1,503; Referee: Ross Joyce |
Note: Fixture was initially scheduled for 11 January, but was rearranged due to involvements in the FA Cup.

| 15 March 2025 37 | Accrington Stanley | 1–1 | Gillingham | Accrington |
| 15:00 GMT | Ward (yellow card) 38', (goal) 45+3'; Matthews (yellow card) 56'; Whitmarsh (yellow card) 58'; Conneely (yellow card) 60'; Woods (yellow card) 77'; Walton (yellow card) 81'; Coyle (yellow card) 90+3' | Report | Gale (yellow card) 43'; Armani Little (yellow card) 77'; Clark 90+4' | Stadium: Crown Ground; Attendance: 2,449; Referee: Charles Breakspear |

| 22 March 2025 38 | Swindon Town | 0–0 | Accrington Stanley | Swindon |
| 15:00 GMT | Smith (yellow card) 21'; Sobowale (yellow card) 33'; Ripley (yellow card) 57' | Report | Batty (yellow card) 39'; Mooney (yellow card) 57' | Stadium: County Ground; Attendance: 7,168; Referee: Aaron Bannister |

| 29 March 2025 39 | Accrington Stanley | 0–0 | Bradford City | Accrington |
| 12:30 GMT | Woods (yellow card) 39'; Matthews (yellow card) 86' | Report | Baldwin (yellow card) 45'; Smallwood (yellow card) 61'; Pattison (yellow card) 86'; Byrne (yellow card) 90+4' | Stadium: Crown Ground; Attendance: 4,572; Referee: Neil Hair |
Note: Fixture was initially scheduled for a 15:00 kick-off, but was moved for live Sky Sports broadcasting.

| 1 April 2025 40 | Accrington Stanley | 1–4 | Fleetwood Town | Accrington |
| 19:45 BST | Grant (yellow card) 39'; Ward (yellow card) 45+3'; Woods 52'; Batty (yellow card) 90+2' | Report | Helm 9'; Wiredu (yellow card) 27'; Marsh (yellow card) 31'; Patterson 62'; Grant 85' (o.g.); Hunt 90' | Stadium: Crown Ground; Attendance: 1,987; Referee: Darren Drysdale |

| 6 April 2025 41 | Bromley | 4–0 | Accrington Stanley | Bromley |
| 15:00 BST | Congreve 29'; Cheek 56' (pen.), 76' (pen.); Arthurs (yellow card) 60'; Grant (yellow card) 64'; Thompson 69' | Report | Ward (yellow card) 28' | Stadium: Hayes Lane; Attendance: 2,410; Referee: Alan Young |

| 12 April 2025 42 | Accrington Stanley | 3–3 | Tranmere Rovers | Accrington |
| 15:00 BST | B. Woods 1', (yellow card) 77'; Walton 24'; J. Woods 42'; Batty (yellow card) 90+5' | Report | Morris (yellow card) 61'; Hendry (yellow card) 77'; Patrick 78', 90+11'; Dennis 87'; Taylor (yellow card) 90+12' | Stadium: Crown Ground; Attendance: 3,197; Referee: Seb Stockbridge |

| 18 April 2025 43 | Salford City | 1–2 | Accrington Stanley | Kersal |
| 15:00 BST | Mnoga (yellow card) 61'; Adelakun 70' (pen.); N'Mai (yellow card) 74'; Ashley (yellow card) 83' | Report | Walton (yellow card) 15'; Whalley 36', (yellow card) 87'; Woods 62'; Kelly (yellow card) 90+3' | Stadium: Moor Lane; Attendance: 2,945; Referee: Lee Swabey |

| 21 April 2025 44 | Accrington Stanley | 1–1 | Carlisle United | Accrington |
| 15:00 BST | Aljofree 69'; Love (yellow card) 90+3' | Report | Whelan 90+2'; Hayden (yellow card) 90+4' | Stadium: Crown Ground; Attendance: 3,380; Referee: Martin Coy |

| 26 April 2025 45 | Walsall | 0–1 | Accrington Stanley | Walsall |
| 15:00 BST | Adomah (yellow card) 59'; Barrett (red card) 78'; Jellis (yellow card) 90+5' | Report | B. Woods 33'; O'Brien-Whitmarsh (yellow card) 59'; Walton (yellow card) 76'; Coyle (yellow card) 82'; J. Woods (yellow card) 90+2' | Stadium: Bescot Stadium; Attendance: 8,131; Referee: Alex Chilowicz |

| 3 May 2025 46 | Accrington Stanley | 0–1 | Chesterfield | Accrington |
| 15:00 BST | | Report | Grigg 32'; McFadzean (yellow card) 78' | Stadium: Crown Ground; Attendance: 3,969; Referee: Thomas Parsons |

=== FA Cup ===
Accrington Stanley were drawn away to Rushall Olympic in the first round, at home to Swindon Town in the second round and away to Liverpool in the third round.

Win Draw Loss Fixtures

| 2 November 2024 First round | Rushall Olympic | 0–2 | Accrington Stanley | Rushall |
| 15:00 GMT | Heard (yellow card) 21'; Benbow (yellow card) 55' (yellow-red card) 60'; Charles (yellow card) 86' | Report | Woods 73'; Walton 82' | Stadium: Dales Lane; Referee: Steven Copeland |

| 30 November 2024 Second round | Accrington Stanley | 2–2 (a.e.t.) (4–1 p) | Swindon Town | Accrington |
| 15:00 GMT | Walton 17', 90+1'; Conneely (yellow card) 117' | Report | Kilkenny (yellow card) 25'; Butterworth (red card) 41'; Hall 45+2'; Smith (penalty missed) 63'; Cotterill 70' | Stadium: Crown Ground; Attendance: 1,534; Referee: Geoff Eltringham |
| | Penalties |
| | Popoola (penalty scored); Knowles (penalty scored); Woods (penalty scored); Khumbeni (penalty scored) | | (penalty missed) Drinan; (penalty missed) Cotterill; (penalty scored) Wright |

| 11 January 2025 Third round | Liverpool | 4–0 | Accrington Stanley | Liverpool |
| 12:15 GMT | Jota 29'; Alexander-Arnold 45'; Danns 76'; Chiesa 90' | Report | Henderson (yellow card) 58' | Stadium: Anfield; Attendance: 60,261; Referee: Lewis Smith |

=== EFL Cup ===
On 27 June, the draw for the first round was made, with Accrington being drawn away against Tranmere Rovers.

Win Draw Loss Fixtures

| 13 August 2024 First round | Tranmere Rovers | 3–0 | Accrington Stanley | Birkenhead |
| 19:45 BST | Saunders 3'; Williams 45'; Walker (penalty missed) 68'; Patrick 71'; Wood (yellow card) 90+1' | Report | Kelly (yellow card) 29'; Whalley (yellow card) 44'; O'Brien (yellow card) 69'; Quirk (yellow card) 72'; Woods (yellow card) 88' | Stadium: Prenton Park; Attendance: 2,288; Referee: Scott Simpson |

=== EFL Trophy ===
In the group stage, Accrington were drawn into Northern Group A alongside Stockport County, Tranmere Rovers and Everton U21.

| Pos | Div | Team | Pld | W | PW | PL | L | GF | GA | GD | Pts | Qualification |
|---|---|---|---|---|---|---|---|---|---|---|---|---|
| 1 | L1 | Stockport County | 3 | 2 | 0 | 0 | 1 | 8 | 4 | +4 | 6 | Advance to Round 2 |
| 2 | L2 | Tranmere Rovers | 3 | 2 | 0 | 0 | 1 | 5 | 4 | +1 | 6 | Advance to Round 2 |
| 3 | ACA | Everton U21 | 3 | 1 | 0 | 0 | 2 | 5 | 7 | −2 | 3 | |
| 4 | L2 | Accrington Stanley | 3 | 1 | 0 | 0 | 2 | 4 | 7 | −3 | 3 | |

Source: EFL

Win Draw Loss Fixtures

| 3 September 2024 Group stage | Accrington Stanley | 1–4 | Stockport County | Accrington |
| 19:45 BST | Hunter 7'; B. Woods (yellow card) 32'; J. Woods (yellow card) 53' | Report | Powell (yellow card) 23'; Stretton 33', 35'; Norwood (yellow card) 41'; Horsfall (yellow card) 47'; Camps 82'; Barry 90+1' | Stadium: Crown Ground; Attendance: 791; Referee: Scott Jackson |

| 8 October 2024 Group stage | Tranmere Rovers | 2–1 | Accrington Stanley | Birkenhead |
| 19:00 BST | Hawkes 49'; Hendry (yellow card) 66'; Taylor 75' | Report | Knowles (penalty missed) 59'; Coyle (yellow card) 63'; Awe (yellow card) 88' (yellow-red card) 90+6'; Popoola 90' | Stadium: Prenton Park; Referee: Zac Kennard-Kettle |

| 29 October 2024 Group stage | Accrington Stanley | 2–1 | Everton U21 | Accrington |
| 19:45 GMT | Whitaker 24' (o.g.); Conneely (yellow card) 31'; Hunter (yellow card) 41'; Woods 59'; Wilkinson (yellow card) 72' | Report | Armstrong 28'; Benjamin (yellow card) 30' | Stadium: Crown Ground; Attendance: 450; Referee: John Mulligan |

== Statistics ==
=== Appearances and goals ===
As of match played 26 April 2025

Players with no appearances are not included on the list
Italics indicate a loaned in player

| No. | Pos | Nat | Player | Total | | League Two | | FA Cup | | EFL Cup | | EFL Trophy | |
| No. | Pos | Nat | Player | Apps | Goals | Apps | Goals | Apps | Goals | Apps | Goals | Apps | Goals |
|---|---|---|---|---|---|---|---|---|---|---|---|---|---|
| 1 | GK | (Republic of Ireland) IRL | Michael Kelly | 14 | 0 | 11+0 | 0 | 0+0 | 0 | 1+0 | 0 | 2+0 | 0 |
| 2 | DF | (Scotland) SCO | Donald Love | 45 | 1 | 39+2 | 1 | 3+0 | 0 | 0+0 | 0 | 1+0 | 0 |
| 4 | MF | (England) ENG | Conor Grant | 15 | 0 | 5+10 | 0 | 0+0 | 0 | 0+0 | 0 | 0+0 | 0 |
| 5 | DF | (England) ENG | Farrend Rawson | 41 | 1 | 38+0 | 1 | 2+0 | 0 | 1+0 | 0 | 0+0 | 0 |
| 6 | MF | (Northern Ireland) NIR | Liam Coyle | 39 | 0 | 26+8 | 0 | 2+1 | 0 | 1+0 | 0 | 0+1 | 0 |
| 7 | FW | (England) ENG | Shaun Whalley | 36 | 9 | 32+1 | 9 | 2+0 | 0 | 1+0 | 0 | 0+0 | 0 |
| 8 | MF | (England) ENG | Ben Woods | 41 | 9 | 31+5 | 9 | 2+0 | 0 | 0+1 | 0 | 2+0 | 0 |
| 9 | FW | (England) ENG | Kelsey Mooney | 31 | 4 | 18+11 | 4 | 0+1 | 0 | 1+0 | 0 | 0+0 | 0 |
| 10 | MF | (England) ENG | Alex Henderson | 32 | 1 | 9+18 | 1 | 0+2 | 0 | 1+0 | 0 | 1+1 | 0 |
| 11 | FW | (England) ENG | Jimmy Knowles | 21 | 2 | 9+7 | 2 | 0+2 | 0 | 0+1 | 0 | 2+0 | 0 |
| 12 | MF | (England) ENG | Seb Quirk | 17 | 0 | 9+6 | 0 | 0+0 | 0 | 1+0 | 0 | 0+1 | 0 |
| 13 | GK | (England) ENG | Billy Crellin | 38 | 0 | 34+0 | 0 | 3+0 | 0 | 0+0 | 0 | 1+0 | 0 |
| 14 | DF | (England) ENG | Benn Ward | 21 | 1 | 21+0 | 1 | 0+0 | 0 | 0+0 | 0 | 0+0 | 0 |
| 15 | DF | (England) ENG | Aaron Pickles | 3 | 0 | 0+1 | 0 | 0+0 | 0 | 0+0 | 0 | 2+0 | 0 |
| 16 | MF | (England) ENG | Jake Batty | 28 | 0 | 20+4 | 0 | 1+0 | 0 | 0+0 | 0 | 3+0 | 0 |
| 17 | DF | (England) ENG | Devon Matthews | 19 | 0 | 18+1 | 0 | 0+0 | 0 | 0+0 | 0 | 0+0 | 0 |
| 18 | FW | (Wales) WAL | Charlie Caton | 11 | 0 | 3+8 | 0 | 0+0 | 0 | 0+0 | 0 | 0+0 | 0 |
| 19 | FW | (England) ENG | Anjola Popoola | 4 | 1 | 0+1 | 0 | 0+1 | 0 | 0+0 | 0 | 0+2 | 1 |
| 20 | FW | (England) ENG | Charlie Brown | 11 | 0 | 0+11 | 0 | 0+0 | 0 | 0+0 | 0 | 0+0 | 0 |
| 22 | MF | (England) ENG | Dan Martin | 7 | 0 | 3+2 | 0 | 1+0 | 0 | 1+0 | 0 | 0+0 | 0 |
| 23 | MF | (England) ENG | Tyler Walton | 45 | 9 | 30+10 | 6 | 3+0 | 3 | 0+1 | 0 | 1+0 | 0 |
| 24 | DF | (England) ENG | Sonny Aljofree | 26 | 3 | 23+1 | 3 | 2+0 | 0 | 0+0 | 0 | 0+0 | 0 |
| 25 | DF | (England) ENG | Josh Smith | 1 | 0 | 0+0 | 0 | 0+0 | 0 | 0+0 | 0 | 1+0 | 0 |
| 26 | MF | (England) ENG | Charlie Hall | 3 | 0 | 0+1 | 0 | 0+0 | 0 | 0+0 | 0 | 1+1 | 0 |
| 27 | FW | (Northern Ireland) NIR | Lewis Trickett | 4 | 0 | 0+1 | 0 | 0+0 | 0 | 0+0 | 0 | 1+2 | 0 |
| 28 | MF | (Republic of Ireland) IRL | Seamus Conneely | 30 | 1 | 20+6 | 1 | 0+3 | 0 | 0+0 | 0 | 1+0 | 0 |
| 31 | MF | (England) ENG | Finlay Tunstall | 1 | 0 | 0+0 | 0 | 0+0 | 0 | 0+0 | 0 | 0+1 | 0 |
| 32 | MF | (England) ENG | Lennox Williams | 1 | 0 | 0+0 | 0 | 0+0 | 0 | 0+0 | 0 | 0+1 | 0 |
| 33 | MF | (England) ENG | Finlay Wilkinson | 1 | 0 | 0+0 | 0 | 0+0 | 0 | 0+0 | 0 | 0+1 | 0 |
| 34 | MF | (England) ENG | Sheikh Sohna | 1 | 0 | 0+0 | 0 | 0+0 | 0 | 0+0 | 0 | 0+1 | 0 |
| 38 | DF | (England) ENG | Connor O'Brien | 30 | 0 | 18+7 | 0 | 1+1 | 0 | 1+0 | 0 | 1+1 | 0 |
| 39 | FW | (England) ENG | Josh Woods | 37 | 7 | 15+15 | 5 | 2+1 | 1 | 0+1 | 0 | 3+0 | 1 |
| 43 | MF | (Republic of Ireland) IRL | Joe O'Brien-Whitmarsh | 12 | 3 | 6+6 | 3 | 0+0 | 0 | 0+0 | 0 | 0+0 | 0 |
| 45 | FW | (England) ENG | Ashley Hunter | 27 | 1 | 9+11 | 0 | 1+2 | 0 | 0+1 | 0 | 3+0 | 1 |
Player(s) who featured whilst on loan but returned to parent club during the season:
| 4 | DF | (England) ENG | Zach Awe | 27 | 1 | 21+0 | 1 | 3+0 | 0 | 1+0 | 0 | 2+0 | 0 |
| 14 | MF | (Malawi) MAW | Nelson Khumbeni | 24 | 1 | 13+5 | 1 | 3+0 | 0 | 0+0 | 0 | 3+0 | 0 |
| 17 | FW | (Republic of Ireland) IRL | Dara Costelloe | 21 | 5 | 14+3 | 5 | 2+0 | 0 | 1+0 | 0 | 1+0 | 0 |
Player(s) who featured but departed the club permanently during the season:
| 20 | MF | (England) ENG | Oliver Patrick | 1 | 0 | 0+0 | 0 | 0+0 | 0 | 0+0 | 0 | 1+0 | 0 |
