= Donald Love =

Footballer (born 1994)

Personal information
- Full name: Donald Alistair Love
- Date of birth: 2 December 1994 (age 31)
- Place of birth: Rochdale, England
- Height: 5 ft 10 in (1.78 m)
- Position: Defender

Team information
- Current team: Accrington Stanley
- Number: 2

Youth career
- Northwich Town
- 2002–2013: Manchester United

Senior career*
Years	Team	Apps	(Gls)
2013–2016	Manchester United	1	(0)
2015	→ Wigan Athletic (loan)	7	(0)
2016–2019	Sunderland	27	(0)
2019–2021	Shrewsbury Town	42	(0)
2021–2022	Salford City	25	(0)
2022–2024	Morecambe	52	(2)
2024–	Accrington Stanley	76	(2)

International career
2010–2011	Scotland U17	3	(0)
2013	Scotland U19	1	(0)
2015–2016	Scotland U21	5	(0)
- * Club domestic league appearances and goals as of 16:39, 3 May 2026 (UTC)

Donald Alistair Love (born 2 December 1994) is a professional footballer who plays as a defender for EFL League Two club Accrington Stanley.

Love began his professional career with Manchester United, but made just two senior appearances, and after a loan spell with Wigan Athletic in 2015, he was sold to Sunderland at the end of the 2015–16 season. Three years into a four-year contract, he was released by the club and joined Shrewsbury Town.

Born in England, Love represents Scotland at international level, having played for the under-17, under-19 and under-21 national teams.

== Club career ==
=== Manchester United and Wigan Athletic (loan) ===
Love was born in Rochdale, Greater Manchester. He played junior football for Northwich Town and was personally scouted by Alex Ferguson. After rising through the ranks of the Manchester United academy, he first signed a professional contract with Manchester United in 2013.

On 2 October 2015, he was loaned to Wigan Athletic for two months. Love made his professional debut the following day, appearing as a 70th-minute substitute for Will Grigg in a goalless League One draw with Walsall at the DW Stadium. Love totalled eight appearances for the Latics.

After returning from his loan spell, Love made his Manchester United debut in a 2–1 defeat against Sunderland at the Stadium of Light on 13 February 2016, coming on as a first-half substitute for the injured Matteo Darmian. Five days later, he made his first start in an injury-stricken United team, a 2–1 loss away to Midtjylland in the first leg of the Europa League round of 32, and was booked for a challenge on Martin Pušić that caused the Austrian to be substituted.

=== Sunderland ===
On 11 August 2016, Love joined Premier League club Sunderland on a four-year deal. He joined with his Manchester United teammate Paddy McNair, for a combined fee of £5.5 million. He made his debut two days later, playing the full 90 minutes of a 2–1 loss at Manchester City, and scored his first goal for Sunderland in an EFL Cup tie against Carlisle United on 22 August 2017.

In August 2018, Love sustained an injury to his ankle which, after attempting to continue playing for another three matches, kept him out of first-team action for the remainder of the 2018–19 season. After three years, a year before the end of his contract, Love was released by Sunderland in July 2019.

=== Shrewsbury Town ===
Following his release from Sunderland, on 12 July 2019, Love signed for fellow League One side Shrewsbury Town on a two-year deal. He made his debut on 3 August, playing the full 90 minutes of a 1–0 home win over Portsmouth. On 13 November, after coming on in the 67th minute for Louis Thompson in a 3–1 win over Macclesfield Town in the EFL Trophy group stage, he was sent off.

On 26 January 2020, in the fourth round of the FA Cup at home to Liverpool, Love drove Neco Williams' cross into his own net in the first minute of the second half to give Liverpool a 2–0 lead, though Shrewsbury drew the match 2–2 to earn a replay. On 12 May 2021 it was announced that he would leave Shrewsbury at the end of the season, following the expiry of his contract.

=== Salford City ===
On 31 August 2021, he signed a one-year contract with League Two side Salford City, with manager Gary Bowyer signing him to provide competition in various positions.

=== Morecambe ===
On 17 June 2022, Love agreed to join League One club Morecambe on a two-year deal upon the expiration of his contract with Salford City.

=== Accrington Stanley ===
On 23 July 2024, Love agreed to join League Two club Accrington Stanley on a two-year deal.

== International career ==
Love was born in Rochdale, England but qualifies for the Scotland national team through his Stranraer-born grandmother. He has represented Scotland at under-17, under-19 and under-21 level.

== Career statistics ==
As of 21 September 2024

Appearances and goals by club, season and competition
Club!	Season	League			FA Cup		League Cup		Other		Total	
Club!	Season	Division	Apps	Goals	Apps	Goals	Apps	Goals	Apps	Goals	Apps	Goals
Manchester United	2015–16	Premier League	1	0	0	0	0	0	1 (Note: Appearance in Europa League)	0	2	0
Wigan Athletic (loan)	2015–16	League One	7	0	1	0	0	0	0	0	8	0
Sunderland	2016–17	Premier League	12	0	2	0	2	0	—		16	0
Sunderland	2017–18	Championship	11	0	1	0	2	1	—		14	1
Sunderland	2018–19	League One	4	0	0	0	0	0	0	0	4	0
Sunderland	Total		27	0	3	0	4	1	0	0	34	1
Sunderland U21s/U23s	2016–17 EFL Trophy		—		—		—		2 (Note: Appearances in the EFL Trophy)	1	2	1
Sunderland U21s/U23s	2017–18 EFL Trophy		—		—		—		3	1	3	1
Sunderland U21s/U23s	Total		—		—		—		5	2	5	2
Shrewsbury Town	2019–20	League One	28	0	7	0	0	0	3	0	38	0
Shrewsbury Town	2020–21	League One	14	0	0	0	1	0	3	0	18	0
Shrewsbury Town	Total		42	0	7	0	1	0	6	0	56	0
Salford City	2021–22	League Two	25	0	2	0	0	0	2	0	29	0
Salford City	Total		25	0	2	0	0	0	0	0	29	2
Morecambe	2022–23	League One	36	2	0	0	2	0	3	0	41	2
Morecambe	2023-24	League Two	16	0	1	0	1	0	1	0	19	0
Morecambe	Total		52	2	1	0	3	0	4	0	60	2
Accrington Stanley	2024-25	League Two	7	1	0	0	0	0	1	0	8	1
Career total			161	3	14	0	8	1	19	2	202	8
