= Aaron Pickles =

English footballer (born 2004)

Personal information
- Full name: Aaron Thomas Pickles
- Date of birth: 15 December 2004 (age 21)
- Position: Defender

Team information
- Current team: Silsden

Youth career
- Accrington Stanley

Senior career*
Years	Team	Apps	(Gls)
2022–2025	Accrington Stanley	18	(0)
2022	→ Glossop North End (loan)	1	(0)
2023	→ Warrington Rylands (loan)	5	(0)
2024	→ Farsley Celtic (loan)	4	(2)
2025	→ Southport (loan)	14	(0)
2025–2026	Southport	12	(0)
2025	→ Warrington Town (loan)		
2026–	Silsden	1	(0)
- * Club domestic league appearances and goals as of 17:37, 23 January 2026 (UTC)

Aaron Thomas Pickles (born 15 December 2004) is an English professional footballer who plays as a defender for Northern Premier League Division One East club Silsden.

== Career ==
=== Accrington Stanley ===
Pickles began his career at Accrington Stanley. On 14 October 2022, he joined Glossop North End on a work experience loan. He made his debut the following day, in a 2–1 home defeat to Macclesfield. He made his first-team debut for Accrington on 28 January 2023, after coming on as an 80th-minute substitute for Doug Tharme in a 3–1 defeat to Leeds United in an FA Cup fourth round match at the Crown Ground.

On 15 November 2024, Pickles joined National League North side Farsley Celtic on a one-month loan deal. On 24 January 2025, he joined Southport on a one-month loan.

On 9 May 2025, Accrington Stanley announced the player would be leaving when his contract expired in June.

=== Non-League ===
On 18 July 2025, Pickles returned to Southport for a third spell, signing a permanent one-year deal with an option for a further twelve months.

In September he joined Warrington Town on loan until January 2026 but was recalled in October.

In January 2026, he joined Silsden.

== Career statistics ==
As of end of 2024–25 season

Appearances and goals by club, season and competition
Club	Season	League			FA Cup		EFL Cup		Other		Total	
Club	Season	Division	Apps	Goals	Apps	Goals	Apps	Goals	Apps	Goals	Apps	Goals
Accrington Stanley	2022–23	League One	5	0	1	0	0	0	0	0	6	0
Accrington Stanley	2023–24	League Two	12	0	0	0	1	0	2 (Note: Appearance(s) in EFL Trophy)	0	15	0
Accrington Stanley	2024–25	League Two	1	0	0	0	0	0	2	0	3	0
Accrington Stanley	Total		18	0	1	0	1	0	4	0	24	0
Glossop North End (loan)	2022–23	Northern Premier League; Division One West	1	0	0	0	—		0	0	1	0
Warrington Rylands (loan)	2024–25	Northern Premier League Premier Division	5	0	0	0	—		0	0	5	0
Farsley Celtic (loan)	2024–25	National League North	4	2	0	0	—		1 (Note: Appearance(s) in FA Trophy)	0	5	2
Southport (loan)	2024–25	National League North	14	0	0	0	—		0	0	14	0
Career total			37	2	1	0	1	0	5	0	44	2
