= Oliver Patrick =

English footballer (born 2003)

Personal information
- Full name: Oliver Edward Patrick
- Date of birth: 2 February 2003 (age 23)
- Place of birth: Oldham, England
- Position: Midfielder

Youth career
- –2021: Bury
- 2021–2024: Accrington Stanley

Senior career*
Years	Team	Apps	(Gls)
2022–2024	Accrington Stanley	3	(0)
2022	→ Bamber Bridge (loan)	3	(0)
2022–2023	→ Nantwich Town (loan)	5	(0)
2023	→ Atherton Collieries (loan)	3	(0)
- * Club domestic league appearances and goals as of 15:04, 23 April 2024 (UTC)

Oliver Edward Patrick (born 2 February 2003) is an English footballer who plays as a midfielder.

== Career ==
Born in Oldham, Patrick joined Bury at the age of eleven, departing the club when they went into liquidation in July 2021, joining Accrington Stanley. He signed a new improved two-year deal in August 2022. During the 2022–23 season, he spent time on loan with Bamber Bridge and Nantwich Town.

On 8 August 2023, Patrick made his senior debut for Accrington Stanley, coming on as a late substitute in an EFL Cup First Round penalty defeat to Bradford City. From September to November of the same year, he made two EFL Trophy appearances, sandwiching a loan spell with Atherton Collieries. In February 2024, he made his league debut as a late substitute in a 2–1 defeat to Walsall. Following the conclusion of the 2023–24, Patrick had his contract extension clause triggered.

On 1 October 2024, Patrick's departure from Accrington Stanley was announced.

== Career statistics ==
As of 6 October 2024

Appearances and goals by club, season and competition
Club	Season	League			FA Cup		League Cup		Other		Total	
Club	Season	Division	Apps	Goals	Apps	Goals	Apps	Goals	Apps	Goals	Apps	Goals
Accrington Stanley	2022–23	League One	0	0	0	0	0	0	0	0	0	0
Accrington Stanley	2023–24	League Two	3	0	0	0	1	0	2 (Note: Appearance(s) in EFL Trophy)	0	6	0
Accrington Stanley	2024–25	League Two	0	0	0	0	0	0	1	0	1	0
Accrington Stanley	Total		3	0	0	0	1	0	3	0	7	0
Bamber Bridge (loan)	2022–23	NPL Premier Division	3	0	0	0	—		1 (Note: Appearance(s) in FA Trophy)	0	4	0
Nantwich Town	2022–23	NPL Premier Division	5	0	0	0	—		0	0	5	0
Atherton Collieries (loan)	2023–24	NPL Premier Division	3	0	0	0	—		1	0	4	0
Career total			14	0	0	0	1	0	5	0	20	0
