= Kelsey Mooney =

English footballer

Personal information
- Full name: Kelsey Thomas Mooney
- Date of birth: 5 February 1999 (age 27)
- Place of birth: Hemel Hempstead, England
- Height: 1.89 m (6 ft 2 in)
- Position: Striker

Team information
- Current team: Accrington Stanley
- Number: 9

Youth career
- –2018: Aston Villa

Senior career*
Years	Team	Apps	(Gls)
2018–2019	Aston Villa	0	(0)
2018–2019	→ Cheltenham Town (loan)	8	(1)
2019–2020	Hereford	20	(5)
2020–2021	Scunthorpe United	0	(0)
2020	→ Hereford (loan)	8	(1)
2021–2023	Leamington	47	(7)
2023–2024	Boston United	41	(16)
2024–	Accrington Stanley	35	(4)
- * Club domestic league appearances and goals as of 16:48, 3 May 2026 (UTC)

Kelsey Thomas Mooney (born 5 February 1999) is an English professional footballer who plays as a striker for EFL League Two club Accrington Stanley.

== Career ==
Mooney began his career with Aston Villa, turning professional in February 2017. He moved on loan to Cheltenham Town in August 2018. He made his debut on 1 September 2018, in the English Football League, scoring his first goal a week later.

He left Aston Villa at the end of the 2018–19 season, signing for Hereford in October 2019. In March 2020 he said that he hoped his partnership with new teammate Lenell John-Lewis would allow him to score more goals, and for the team to win more games. In July 2020 it was reported that Mooney had accepted an offer to return to a club in the Football League, although Hereford manager Josh Gowling wanted him to stay at the club. On 3 August 2020 he signed a one-year contract with Scunthorpe United. On 16 October 2020 he returned to Hereford on loan. He was one of 17 players released by Scunthorpe at the end of the 2020–21 season.

In August 2021 he joined Leamington.

In May 2023, he signed for Boston United.

On 17 May 2024, Mooney signed for Accrington Stanley on a two-year contract.

== Personal life ==
His father is former professional footballer Tommy Mooney.

== Career statistics ==
As of match played 2 May 2026

Appearances and goals by club, season and competition
Club	Season	League			FA Cup		EFL Cup		Other		Total	
Club	Season	Division	Apps	Goals	Apps	Goals	Apps	Goals	Apps	Goals	Apps	Goals
Aston Villa	2018–19	Championship	0	0	0	0	0	0	0	0	0	0
Cheltenham Town (loan)	2018–19	League Two	8	1	1	0	0	0	4 (Note: Appearance(s) in EFL Trophy)	1	13	2
Hereford	2019–20	National League North	20	5	0	0	—		2 (Note: Appearance(s) in FA Trophy)	0	22	5
Scunthorpe United	2020–21	League Two	0	0	0	0	0	0	1	0	1	0
Hereford (loan)	2020–21	National League North	8	1	0	0	—		1	0	9	1
Leamington	2021–22	National League North	30	6	0	0	—		1	0	31	6
Leamington	2022–23	National League North	17	1	0	0	—		0	0	17	1
Leamington	Total		47	7	0	0	0	0	1	0	48	7
Boston United	2023–24	National League North	41	16	3	1	—		3	0	47	17
Accrington Stanley	2024–25	League Two	30	4	1	0	1	0	0	0	32	4
Accrington Stanley	2025–26	League Two	5	0	0	0	3	2	1	0	9	2
Accrington Stanley	Total		35	4	1	0	4	2	1	0	41	6
Career total			159	34	5	1	4	2	13	1	181	38

== Honours ==
Aston Villa U23

- Premier League Cup: 2017–18

Boston United

- National League North play-offs: 2024
