= Charlie Hall (footballer) =

English association professional football player (born 2005)

Personal information
- Full name: Charlie David Hall
- Date of birth: 31 December 2005 (age 20)
- Place of birth: Manchester, England
- Height: 6 ft 0 in (1.84 m)
- Position: Midfielder

Youth career
- 2020–2024: Accrington Stanley

Senior career*
Years	Team	Apps	(Gls)
2024–2026	Accrington Stanley	3	(0)
2024	→ Lancaster City (loan)	8	(0)
- * Club domestic league appearances and goals as of 16:04, 25 May 2026 (UTC)

Charlie David Hall (born 31 December 2005) is an English professional footballer who plays as a midfielder. He is a free agent after leaving Accrington Stanley.

== Career ==
Hall who was born in Manchester joined the Accrington Stanley academy in January 2020 & signed his 1st professional contract with the club in June 2024.

On 30 August 2024, Hall joined Northern Premier League club Lancaster City initially on a months loan which was extended, he made 8 appearances for the club.

On 8 October 2024, he made his senior debut in a 2–1 EFL Trophy defeat to Tranmere Rovers. On 7 December 2024, Hall made his league debut in a 2–1 defeat to Bromley. On 9 May 2025, he had his contract extensions triggered. On 4 May 2026, it was announced he will leave the club this summer upon the expiry of his current contracts.

== Career statistics ==
As of match played 28 February 2026

Appearances and goals by club, season and competition
Club	Season	League			FA Cup		League Cup		Other		Total	
Club	Season	Division	Apps	Goals	Apps	Goals	Apps	Goals	Apps	Goals	Apps	Goals
Accrington Stanley	2023–24	League Two	0	0	0	0	0	0	0	0	0	0
Accrington Stanley	2024–25	League Two	1	0	0	0	0	0	2 (Note: Appearance(s) in EFL Trophy)	0	3	0
Accrington Stanley	2025–26	League Two	2	0	0	0	0	0	0	0	2	0
Accrington Stanley	Total		3	0	0	0	0	0	2	0	5	0
Career total			3	0	0	0	0	0	2	0	5	0
