= Zach Awe =

English association football player (born 2004)

Personal information
- Full name: Zachariah Olumide Ebunoluwa Awe
- Date of birth: 9 January 2004 (age 22)
- Place of birth: Greenwich, England
- Height: 6 ft 4 in (1.92 m)
- Position: Centre-back

Team information
- Current team: Salford City
- Number: 3

Youth career
- 2012–2023: Arsenal
- 2023–2024: Southampton

Senior career*
Years	Team	Apps	(Gls)
2024–2026	Southampton	0	(0)
2024–2025	→ Accrington Stanley (loan)	21	(1)
2026–	Salford City	11	(1)

International career
2019–2020	England U16	9	(0)
- * Club domestic league appearances and goals as of 05:40, 12 September 2026 (UTC)

Zachariah Olumide Ebunoluwa Awe (born 9 January 2004) is a professional footballer who plays as a centre-back for EFL League Two club Salford City. He has represented his country at youth level.

== Club career ==
Awe spent eleven years in the youth ranks at Arsenal. He made appearances in the EFL Trophy for Arsenal, and was included in match-day squads for the first team, and was an unused substitute in the Premier League without making a first team debut. He joined Southampton in August 2023, despite being offered new terms by his hometown club, signing a three-year contract, initially joining the Under-21's for the 2023–24 season.

On 4 July 2024, Awe joined League Two club Accrington Stanley on a season-long loan. He made his debut for the club on 10 August 2024 in a 4–1 defeat against Doncaster Rovers. On 8 October 2024, Awe received a red card during a 2–1 defeat against Tranmere Rovers in the EFL Trophy. He scored his first goal for the club on 9 November 2024 in a 3–0 away victory against Chesterfield. On 3 February 2025, Awe was recalled from loan and returned to Southampton after he suffered an injury in January.

On 7 January 2026, Awe joined Salford City on a 18-month contract. He made his debut for the club on 17 January in a 3–2 away victory against Swindon Town after he replaced Ollie Turton in the 83rd minute. On 21 February, Awe scored his first goal for the club in a 3–2 defeat against Cheltenham Town.

== International career ==
Awe made his debut playing for the England U-16 side in August 2019. In September 2023 he was called up to the England U-20 side.

== Style of play ==
He has been described as a ball-playing central defender, comfortable with the ball at his feet and capable of playing out from the back.

== Personal life ==
Born in Greenwich, London, he has Nigerian and St Lucian heritage.

== Career statistics ==
As of match played 6 October 2026

Appearances and goals by club, season and competition
Club	Season	League			National Cup		League Cup		Other		Total	
Club	Season	Division	Apps	Goals	Apps	Goals	Apps	Goals	Apps	Goals	Apps	Goals
Southampton	2024–25	Premier League	0	0	0	0	0	0	0	0	0	0
Accrington Stanley (loan)	2024–25	League Two	21	1	3	0	1	0	2 (Note: Appearance(s) in EFL Trophy)	0	27	1
Salford City	2025–26	League Two	10	1	1	0	0	0	0	0	11	1
Salford City	2026–27	League Two	1	0	0	0	0	0	2	0	3	0
Salford City	Total		11	1	1	0	0	0	2	0	14	0
Career total			32	2	4	0	1	0	4	0	41	2
