= Josh Williams (Welsh footballer) =

Welsh footballer (born 2004)

Personal information
- Full name: Joshua James Williams
- Date of birth: 13 July 2004 (age 22)
- Position: Midfielder

Team information
- Current team: Colwyn Bay (on loan from Tranmere Rovers)
- Number: 16

Youth career
- 2011–2021: Connah's Quay Nomads

Senior career*
Years	Team	Apps	(Gls)
2021–2024	Connah's Quay Nomads	51	(5)
2024–	Tranmere Rovers	1	(0)
2024–2025	→ Southport (loan)	9	(0)
2026–	→ Colwyn Bay (loan)	14	(1)

International career^{‡}
2023–2024	Wales C	3	(0)
- * Club domestic league appearances and goals as of 08:36, 8 November 2026 (UTC) ‡ National team caps and goals as of 13:24, 15 August 2024 (UTC)

Joshua James Williams (born 13 July 2004) is a Welsh professional footballer who plays as a midfielder for Cymru Premier club Colwyn Bay on loan from EFL League Two club Tranmere Rovers.

== Career ==
=== Connah's Quay Nomads ===
Williams joined Connah's Quay Nomads in the under-8 age group. He went on to help the academy win the Cymru Premier Development North in the 2022 season, losing the national title on penalties. He served Wales Schools as captain and scored a hat-trick as they won the Centenary Shield in 2022. He made his first-team debut in October 2021. He helped Connah's Quay Nomads to win the Welsh Cup in 2024, winning the Goal of the Month award in April for his winning goal in the competition. He was named as player of the match in the final as Nomads defeated The New Saints 2–1 at Rodney Parade.

=== Tranmere Rovers ===
On 1 July 2024, Williams joined League Two club Tranmere Rovers on a two-year contract. He made his debut for Tranmere Rovers on 13 August 2024, in the Carabao Cup, scoring Tranmere Rovers second goal just before half-time in a 3–0 win over Accrington Stanley at Prenton Park.

On 1 November 2024, Williams joined National League North side Southport on an initial one-month loan deal. His recall option was activated on 31 January 2025.

Despite suffering a serious ACL (Anterior Cruciate Ligament) injury in pre-season, Williams signed a contract extension with Tranmere Rovers until the end of the 2026–27 season. Manager Andy Crosby stated that he viewed the midfielder as a key part of his future plans.

In August 2026 he joined Colwyn Bay on loan.

== Career statistics ==
As of match played 28 January 2025

Appearances and goals by club, season and competition
Club	Season	League			National Cup		League Cup		Other		Total	
Club	Season	Division	Apps	Goals	Apps	Goals	Apps	Goals	Apps	Goals	Apps	Goals
Connah's Quay Nomads	2021–22	Cymru Premier	3	0	0	0	1	0	0	0	4	0
Connah's Quay Nomads	2022–23	Cymru Premier	20	1	3	0	2	0	0	0	25	1
Connah's Quay Nomads	2023–24	Cymru Premier	28	4	4	1	0	0	1 (Note: Appearances in the UEFA Champions League)	0	32	5
Connah's Quay Nomads	Total		51	5	7	1	3	0	1	0	62	6
Tranmere Rovers	2024–25	League Two	1	0	0	0	2	1	2 (Note: Appearance(s) in EFL Trophy)	0	5	1
Southport (loan)	2024–25	National League North	9	0	0	0	—		2 (Note: Appearance(s) in FA Trophy)	0	11	0
Career total			61	5	7	1	5	1	5	0	78	7

== Honours ==
Connah's Quay Nomads

- Welsh Cup: 2024
- Welsh League Cup: 2022; runner-up: 2023
