= Seb Quirk =

English footballer (born 2001)

Personal information
- Full name: Sebastian Anthony Quirk
- Date of birth: 5 December 2001 (age 24)
- Position: Midfielder

Team information
- Current team: Sligo Rovers
- Number: 4

Youth career
- 2013–2023: Everton

Senior career*
Years	Team	Apps	(Gls)
2023–2025	Accrington Stanley	41	(0)
2025–	Sligo Rovers	33	(0)
- * Club domestic league appearances and goals as of 11:16, 10 November 2026 (UTC)

Sebastian Anthony Quirk (born 5 December 2001) is an English professional footballer who plays as a midfielder for League of Ireland Premier Division club Sligo Rovers.

== Career ==
=== Early career ===
Quirk began his career with Everton at the age of 11, turning professional in July 2020.

=== Accrington Stanley ===
Quirk signed for Accrington Stanley in January 2023. He said he was "buzzing" to join the club. He made his debut on 21 January 2023. On 9 May 2025, the club announced the player would be leaving when his contract expired in June.

=== Sligo Rovers ===
On 18 June 2025, Quirk signed an 18 month contract with League of Ireland Premier Division club Sligo Rovers, set to commence from 1 July. He made 24 appearances for the club in 2026 as they finished bottom of the league and were relegated to play in the League of Ireland First Division for the first time since 2006.

== Style of play ==
He has been compared to Kalvin Phillips.

== Career statistics ==
As of match played 30 October 2026

Appearances and goals by club, season and competition
Club	Season	League			National Cup (Note: Includes FA Cup & FAI Cup)		League Cup		Other		Total	
Club	Season	Division	Apps	Goals	Apps	Goals	Apps	Goals	Apps	Goals	Apps	Goals
Accrington Stanley	2022–23	League One	13	0	1	0	0	0	0	0	14	0
Accrington Stanley	2023–24	League Two	12	0	0	0	1	0	1 (Note: Appearance(s) in the EFL Trophy.)	0	14	0
Accrington Stanley	2024–25	League Two	16	0	0	0	1	0	1	0	18	0
Accrington Stanley	Total		41	0	1	0	2	0	2	0	46	0
Sligo Rovers	2025	LOI Premier Division	12	0	3	0	–		–		15	0
Sligo Rovers	2026	LOI Premier Division	21	0	3	0	–		–		24	0
Sligo Rovers	Total		33	0	6	0	–		–		39	0
Career total			74	0	7	0	2	0	2	0	85	0
