= Ben Woods (footballer) =

English footballer (born 2002)

Personal information
- Full name: Benjamin Jack Woods
- Date of birth: 27 September 2002 (age 24)
- Place of birth: Wigan, England
- Height: 1.77 m (5 ft 10 in)
- Positions: Midfielder; left-back; left wing-back

Team information
- Current team: Peterborough United
- Number: 16

Youth career
- 2011–2018: Manchester United
- 2018–2022: Burnley

Senior career*
Years	Team	Apps	(Gls)
2023	Inverness Caledonian Thistle	7	(0)
2023–2025	Accrington Stanley	71	(11)
2025–	Peterborough United	28	(3)
- * Club domestic league appearances and goals as of 17:22, 10 October 2026 (UTC)

Benjamin Jack Woods (born 27 September 2002) is an English professional footballer who plays for EFL League One club Peterborough United. Primarily a central midfielder, he can be deployed as a defensive midfielder, left-back or left wing-back.

== Career ==
Born in Wigan, Woods started his career at the Manchester United Academy, where he received a received an England under-15's call up, before he signed for Burnley in 2018, signing his first professional contract the club. He stayed for four years before turning down a contract extension before the start of the 2022/23 season.

On 13 January 2023, Woods signed a short term deal with Scottish Championship side, Inverness Caledonian Thistle, making his professional debut, coming on in the 71st minute of a 0–0 home draw to Queen's Park. Woods made seven appearances for the club. He was on the bench in the Scottish Cup Final 3–1 defeat to Celtic at Hampden Park.

=== Accrington Stanley ===
On 1 September 2023, Woods signed for Accrington Stanley on a one-year contract.

On 29 December 2024, he made his 50th Accrington Stanley League appearance in a 2–1 away defeat to Carlisle United.

On 1 January 2025, Woods scored his first professional brace in a 3–2 victory over promotion-chasing Grimsby Town.

On 31 January 2025, Woods signed a 2 and a half year extension to his contract, keeping him at the club until the Summer of 2027

On 3 May 2025, Woods won numerous awards at the Accrington Stanley 2024–25 end of season awards, including Managers' Player of the Season, Supporters' Trust Player of the Season, Goal of the Season (.v. Walsall away) and shared the Dave 'Haggis' Hargreaves Top Goalscorer award with Shaun Whalley

=== Peterborough United ===
On 18 August 2025, Woods signed for Peterborough United on a four year deal.

On 4 October 2025, Woods made his full debut away to Bolton Wanderers in a 2–1 defeat

On 20 November 2025, Woods scored his first goal for Peterborough, also providing an assist, in a 3–0 victory over Stockport County

== Career statistics ==
As of 15 October 2026

Appearances and goals by club, season and competition
Club	Season	League			National Cup		League Cup		Other		Total	
Club	Season	Division	Apps	Goals	Apps	Goals	Apps	Goals	Apps	Goals	Apps	Goals
Inverness Caledonian Thistle	2022–23	Scottish Championship	7	0	0	0	0	0	0	0	7	0
Accrington Stanley	2023–24	EFL League Two	34	2	2	0	0	0	4	0	40	2
Accrington Stanley	2024–25	EFL League Two	36	9	2	0	1	0	2	0	41	9
Accrington Stanley	2025–26	EFL League Two	1	0	0	0	0	0	0	0	1	0
Accrington Stanley	Total		71	11	4	0	1	0	6	0	82	11
Peterborough United	2025–26	EFL League One	20	1	2	0	0	0	3	0	25	1
Peterborough United	2026–27	EFL League One	8	2	0	0	2	0	1	0	11	2
Peterborough United	Total		28	3	2	0	2	0	4	0	36	3
Career total			106	14	6	0	3	0	10	0	125	14

== Honours ==
Inverness CT

- Scottish Cup runner-up: 2022–23
