= Jimmy Knowles (footballer) =

English footballer

Personal information
- Full name: Jimmy Knowles
- Date of birth: 25 January 2002 (age 24)
- Place of birth: Sutton-in-Ashfield, England
- Height: 1.84 m (6 ft 0 in)
- Position: Forward

Team information
- Current team: Altrincham
- Number: 11

Youth career
- Nottingham Forest
- –2019: Mansfield Town

Senior career*
Years	Team	Apps	(Gls)
2019–2023	Mansfield Town	6	(1)
2020–2021	→ Notts County (loan)	29	(6)
2021–2022	→ Greenock Morton (loan)	10	(0)
2023	→ Kettering Town (loan)	11	(3)
2023–2024	Boston United	47	(18)
2024–2025	Accrington Stanley	16	(2)
2025	→ Boston United (loan)	18	(4)
2025–	Altrincham	45	(11)
- * Club domestic league appearances and goals as of 13:27, 17 June 2026 (UTC)

Jimmy Knowles (born 25 January 2002) is an English footballer who plays as a forward for National League club Altrincham.

== Career ==
Knowles was called up to the Mansfield Town senior team by manager David Flitcroft after he scored four goals in a reserve game against Port Vale in March 2019. He signed a two-year professional contract with the "Stags" three months later. Manager John Dempster gave Knowles his debut in the English Football League in a 0–0 draw with Stevenage at Field Mill on 24 August, putting him on as an 89th-minute substitute for Alex MacDonald. He scored his first goal for the club in an EFL Trophy tie against Crewe Alexandra on 8 October 2019.

He was loaned to Notts County in September 2020. On 5 April 2021 Knowles scored his first senior hat-trick during a 4–2 win in a National League fixture at Woking, scoring in the 60th, 66th & 79th minutes.

Knowles was loaned to Scottish Championship club Greenock Morton in August 2021. There he suffered a ruptured ACL and missed the remainder of the season.

In February 2023, Knowles joined National League North club Kettering Town on an initial one-month loan deal. This was later extended until the end of the season.

He was released by Mansfield at the end of the 2022–23 season and joined National League North side Boston United.

Knowles made an encouraging start to his career at Boston United by scoring a brace to claim the three points during his home debut against South Shields.

=== Accrington Stanley ===
On 12 June 2024, Knowles signed for Accrington Stanley on a two-year contract.

On 14 January 2025, he returned to Boston United on loan for the remainder of the season.

=== Altrincham ===
On 10 June 2025, Knowles joined National League side Altrincham for an undisclosed fee.

== Style of play ==
The Mansfield Town club website described Knowles as a forward with "great work ethic, possesses bags of pace and has an eye for goal".

== Career statistics ==
Appearances and goals by club, season and competition
Club	Season	League			FA Cup		EFL Cup		Other		Total	
Club	Season	Division	Apps	Goals	Apps	Goals	Apps	Goals	Apps	Goals	Apps	Goals
Mansfield Town	2019–20	League Two	5	1	0	0	0	0	3 (Note: Appearance(s) in the Football League Trophy)	1	8	2
Mansfield Town	2020–21	League Two	0	0	0	0	0	0	1	0	1	0
Mansfield Town	2021–22	League Two	0	0	0	0	0	0	0	0	0	0
Mansfield Town	2022–23	League Two	1	0	0	0	0	0	0	0	1	0
Mansfield Town	Total		6	1	0	0	0	0	4	1	10	2
Notts County (loan)	2020–21	National League	23	6	0	0	—		4 (Note: Appearance(s) in the FA Trophy)	4	27	10
Greenock Morton (loan)	2021–22	Scottish Championship	10	0	0	0	0	0	2 (Note: Appearance(s) in Scottish Challenge Cup)	0	12	0
Kettering Town (loan)	2022–23	National League North	11	3	0	0	—		1	0	12	3
Boston United	2023–24	National League North	38	18	3	1	—		1	0	42	19
Career total			88	28	3	1	0	0	12	5	103	34

== Honours ==
Boston United

- National League North play-offs: 2024
