= Tyler Walton =

English footballer (born 1998)

Personal information
- Full name: Tyler Walton
- Date of birth: 23 September 1998 (age 28)
- Position: Winger

Team information
- Current team: Accrington Stanley
- Number: 23

Youth career
- Manchester City
- Leeds United
- Barnsley

Senior career*
Years	Team	Apps	(Gls)
2016–2018	York City	1	(0)
2018–2019	Frickley Athletic		
2019–2022	Farsley Celtic	65	(3)
2022	→ Southport (loan)	4	(1)
2022–2024	Southport	82	(9)
2024–	Accrington Stanley	70	(15)
- * Club domestic league appearances and goals as of 21:44, 14 November 2026 (UTC)

Tyler Walton (born 23 September 1998) is an English footballer who plays as a winger for EFL League Two club Accrington Stanley.

== Career ==
Walton played youth football for Manchester City, Leeds United and Barnsley. Walton spent his early senior career in non-league with York City, where he turned professional in May 2016 aged 17. He made his senior debut in September 2016.

After initially leaving York, he was close to stopping football, but was persuaded to continue by his mother. He went on trial with Guiseley in November 2017, before re-signing for York.

He then signed for Frickley Athletic in February 2018. After playing for Farsley Celtic, he signed for Southport, initially on loan, in January 2022, before moving permanently in February 2022.

Walton signed for Accrington Stanley in May 2024.

== Personal life ==
Walton attended Leeds Sixth Form College.
