= Kayden Jackson =

English footballer (born 1994)

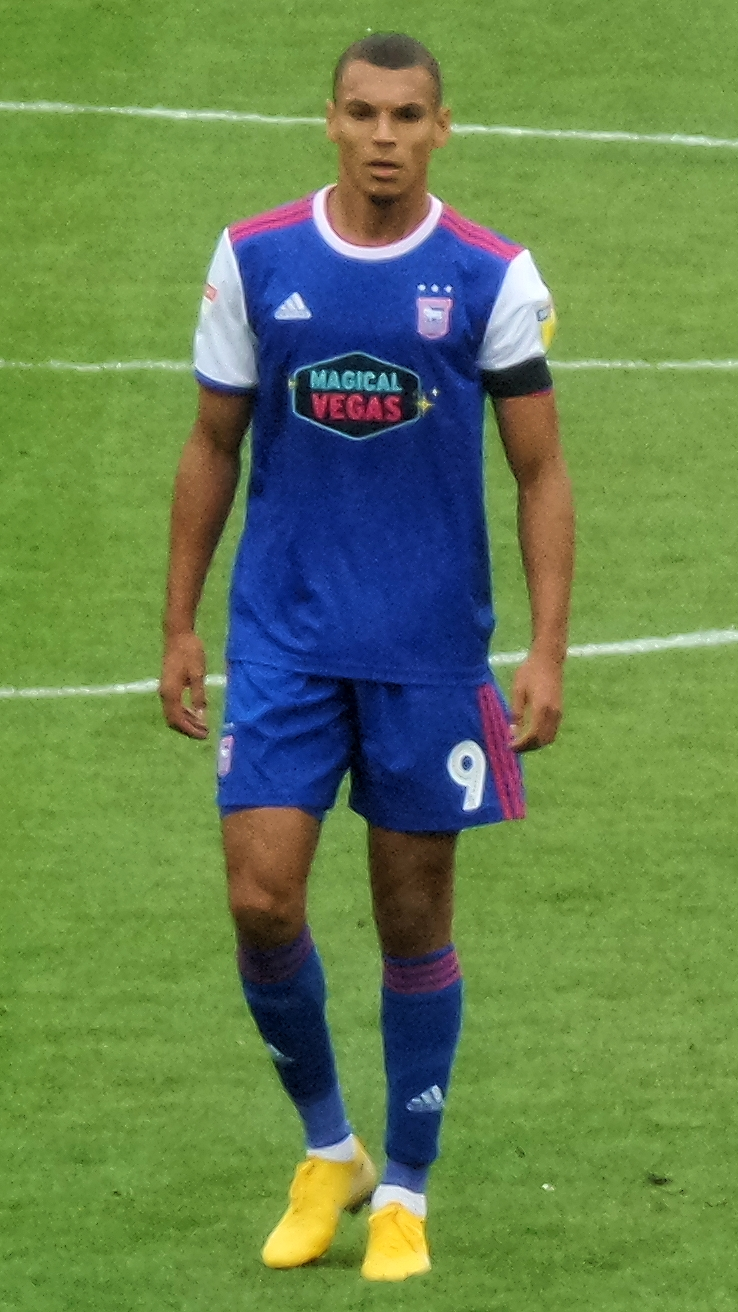
- Jackson playing for Ipswich Town in 2018

Personal information
- Full name: Kayden Pastel Dunn Jackson
- Date of birth: 22 February 1994 (age 32)
- Place of birth: Bradford, England
- Height: 1.81 m (5 ft 11 in)
- Positions: Striker; winger; wing back

Team information
- Current team: Bradford City
- Number: 19

Youth career
- Guiseley
- Bradford City

Senior career*
Years	Team	Apps	(Gls)
- Albion Sports
2013–2014	Swindon Town	0	(0)
2013	→ Swindon Supermarine (loan)	10	(6)
2013–2014	→ Oxford City (loan)	23	(8)
2014–2015	Tamworth	36	(8)
2015–2016	Wrexham	36	(4)
2016–2017	Barnsley	0	(0)
2016–2017	→ Grimsby Town (loan)	20	(1)
2017–2018	Accrington Stanley	45	(16)
2018–2024	Ipswich Town	172	(24)
2024–2026	Derby County	65	(3)
2026–	Bradford City	26	(3)

International career^{‡}
2016	England C	1	(1)
- * Club domestic league appearances and goals as of 13:13, 22 November 2026 (UTC) ‡ National team caps and goals as of 12:00, 16 March 2019 (UTC)

Kayden Pastel Dunn Jackson (born 22 February 1994) is an English professional footballer who plays as a striker, winger, and wing back for EFL League One club Bradford City.

Jackson began his professional career at Swindon Town, having previously played non-league football at Albion Sports. During his time with Swindon he had loan spells at Swindon Supermarine and Oxford City. He moved to Tamworth in 2014, where he spent one season before joining Wrexham in 2015. He moved back into league football in 2016 when he joined Barnsley. He spent one season at Barnsley, including a loan at Grimsby Town. Jackson signed for Accrington Stanley in 2017, helping the club to win the League Two title in his first season at the club. In August 2018, Jackson joined Ipswich Town, after helping the club gain back-to-back promotions to the Premier League. In July 2024, Jackson joined Derby County. In January 2026, Jackson joined hometown club Bradford City.

He has also represented England C at international level, making his debut in 2016.

== Club career ==
=== Early career ===
Born in Bradford, Jackson began his career playing youth football at Guiseley and hometown club Bradford City, before being released after suffering a back injury. Following spells on trial with Blackburn Rovers and Leeds United, he joined Northern Counties East League Division One side Albion Sports.

=== Swindon Town ===
In January 2013, Jackson was among eleven players taking part in the final of Samsung's Win A Pro Contract competition. He made it into the final cut, along with two other players. In March 2013, Jackson trained with the Swindon development team in a bid to win the 'Win a Pro Contract' competition and played a development team match. The following month, he signed for Swindon Town after winning the 'Win a Pro Contract' competition, signing a twelve-month contract on 1 July 2013.

During his loan spells away from Swindon Town, Jackson was monitored by his parent club in the hopes of making a breakthrough into the first team, with Manager Mark Cooper and local newspaper Swindon Advertiser spoke about. At the end of the 2013–14 season, however, the club released him, along with nine other players, after they decided against offering them a contract when it expired in the summer. Upon leaving the club, Jackson stated that he felt he had not been given a chance to establish himself at Swindon Town.

==== Swindon Supermarine (loan) ====
Jackson joined Swindon Supermarine on a month long loan in August 2013. The deal was extended for a further month in September 2013 after he had scored five goals in seven games for the club. In October 2013 his loan deal was again extended by a further month, although he was recalled from his loan spell by his parent club in late October.

==== Oxford City (loan) ====
After being recalled from his loan spell at Swindon Supermarine, he spent another loan spell at Oxford City, having joined them on 1 November 2013. The following day, Jackson scored on his Oxford City debut, coming on as a substitute, in a 3–2 win over Harrogate Town. On 20 December 2013, the loan was extended for the "next couple of months". On 31 January 2014, Jackson extended his loan spell until the end of the season. At the end of the 2013–14 season, Jackson had helped the side avoid relegation, as he made twenty–three appearances, scoring eight times.

=== Tamworth ===
After leaving Swindon Town at the end of the 2013–14 season, he joined Tamworth on 21 July 2014.

Jackson made his Tamworth debut on 9 August, starting in a 0–0 draw against Harrogate Town in the opening game of the season. He scored his first goal for the club, in a 2–1 victory over Gloucester City. Jackson finished the season as a joint–top scorer, along with three other players, scoring 8 goals in 36 appearances for Tamworth.

=== Wrexham ===
On 26 June 2015, Jackson left Tamworth in favour of joining Wrexham on a one–year contract.

Jackson made his Wrexham debut as a substitute, in a 3–1 loss against Bromley in the opening game of the 2015–16 season. He spent the early part of the season appearing as a substitute. As the season progressed, Jackson earned his place in the starting eleven. On 23 February 2016 he scored his first goals for the club, netting a brace in a 2–0 win over Kidderminster Harriers. He was later praised by manager Gary Mills. At the end of the 2015–16 season, Jackson had made thirty–six appearances in all competitions, scoring four goals. Following an impressing debut season at the Racecourse Ground, Jackson was offered a new contract by Wrexham, with Jackson, himself, stating that he was keen to stay at the club.

=== Barnsley ===
After rejecting a new contract at Wrexham, he signed for Barnsley on 23 May 2016, signing a two–year contract with the club for an undisclosed fee.

==== Grimsby Town (loan) ====
He signed on loan for Grimsby Town in July 2016. He scored on his debut for the club in a 2–0 win over Morecambe on 6 August 2016. It wasn't until on 9 November 2016 when Jackson scored again, in a 4–2 loss against Sheffield United in the EFL Trophy. Throughout his time at Grimsby Town, Jackson found himself competing for a place in the starting eleven.

Jackson returned to his parent club Barnsley in February 2017 after his season long loan was retracted. Despite suffering an injury and eventually his place in the team following the departure of Paul Hurst, he went on to make twenty–four appearances in all competitions, scoring twice.

=== Accrington Stanley ===
After impressing manager John Colemen while on trial, Jackson signed for Accrington Stanley for an undisclosed fee on a two-year contract on 21 July 2017.

Jackson scored on his debut for Accrington Stanley, on the opening game of the 2017–18 season, in a 3–1 win over Colchester United. For his performance throughout August, he was nominated for Sky Bet League Two's Player of the Month for August but lost out to Frank Nouble. Soon after joining the club, Jackson established himself in the starting eleven and formed an effective partnership with Billy Kee. Together, they helped contribute to the team's impressive form. In late September, he suffered a hip injury that saw him miss two matches. In a follow-up match, he provided a hat–trick for the side, in a 4–0 win over Chesterfield. At the end of the 2017–18 season, Jackson had scored 16 goals in 44 league appearances, to help Accrington claim the EFL League Two title and earn promotion to EFL League One.

Ahead of the 2018–19 season, Jackson was offered a new contract by the club, whilst attracting interest from other clubs following an impressive 2017–18 season. Jackson made one appearance in the 2018–19 season, in a 2–0 loss to Gillingham in the opening game of the season.

=== Ipswich Town ===
Jackson signed for Ipswich Town on 9 August 2018 on a three-year deal (with an option of a further 12 months) for an undisclosed fee. The move reported to cost £1 million, which was described by the Lancashire Telegraph as "Accrington Stanley's first million pound sale", and saw him reunited with manager Paul Hurst, having previously played under him at Grimsby Town. Ipswich Town managed to beat off competitions from "a number of Sky Bet Championship clubs" to sign him.

He made his Ipswich Town debut on 11 August, coming on as a substitute for Ellis Harrison, in a 1–0 loss against Rotherham United two days after signing for the club. Three days later, on 14 August 2018, Jackson scored his first goal for the club against Exeter City in the first round of the EFL Cup, with Ipswich eventually losing 4–2 in a penalty shootout after the game finished 1–1. He made 38 appearances in all competitions over the course of the 2018–19 season, scoring 4 goals.

He scored his first goal of the 2019–20 season on 20 August, netting a 94th-minute winner in a 2–1 win over AFC Wimbledon at Portman Road. He scored 4 goals during August, including a brace in a 0–5 away win over Bolton Wanderers at the University of Bolton Stadium. His form earned him a nomination for the League One Player of the Month award. Jackson finished the season as Ipswich's joint top goalscorer with 11 goals following the early curtailment of the season due to the Coronavirus outbreak.

Jackson suffered an injury hit start to the 2020–21 season, after suffering a groin injury in pre-season, he returned to the first-team as a second-half substitute in a 4–1 away win over Blackpool on 3 October. Later in the month he was forced to self isolate for 10 days after testing positive for COVID-19. He scored his first goal of the season on 5 December, netting the winner in a 2–1 away win over Plymouth Argyle. In February, Jackson was sent to train with Ipswich's under-23s side along with teammate Jon Nolan after falling out with manager Paul Lambert. On 10 May 2021, Ipswich announced that they had taken up the option to extend Jackson's contract by an additional year, keeping him under contract until 2022. Jackson signed a further two-year contract with the club in May 2022.

Jackson was released by Ipswich at the end of the 2023–24 season, after he helped the club gain back-to-back promotions from League One to the Premier League. Jackson played 199 times for Ipswich, scoring 28 goals.

=== Derby County ===
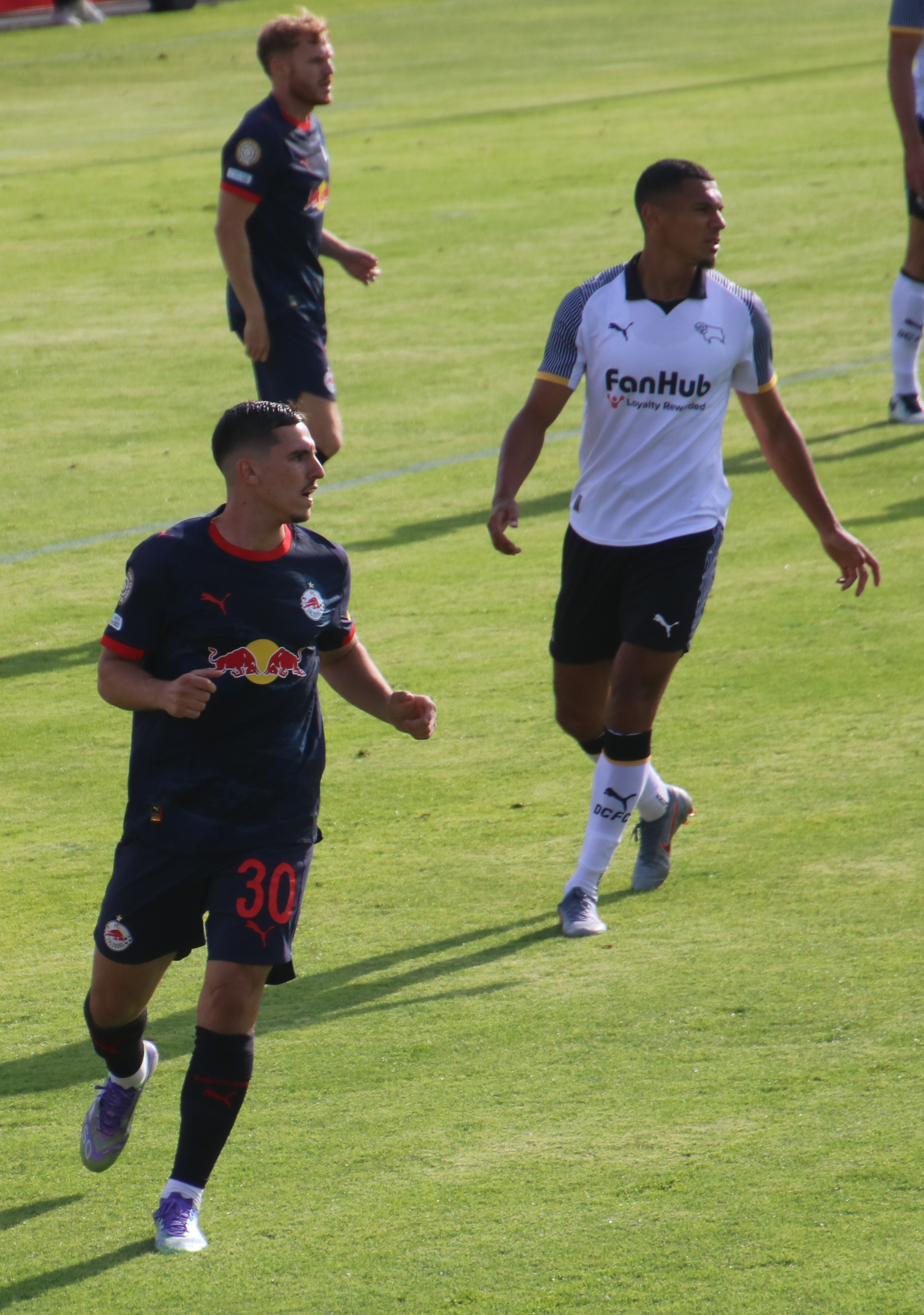
Jackson (right) with Derby County in 2025.

On 2 July 2024, Jackson signed with Championship club Derby County, on a two-year contract. On 9 August, he made his debut for the club in a 2–4 loss against Blackburn Rovers in the league. Four days later, Jackson scored his first goal for the club, netting the winner in a 2–1 EFL Cup win at home to Chesterfield. On 17 August 2024, Jackson scored his first league goal for Derby in a 1–0 victory over Middlesbrough. Jackson played in all 49 of Derby's fixtures during the 2024–25 season, scoring 4 goals as the club finished in 19th place in the Championship.

Jackson failed to score for Derby during the 2025–26 season after playing 21 times, with only three of these appearances being starts as he fell down the pecking order as the season progressed. During his time at Derby County, Jackson played 70 times, scoring four goals.

=== Bradford City ===
In January 2026, Jackson returned to his hometown club Bradford City, signing a two-and-a-half year contract. He made his debut on 31 January in a 1-0 win against Doncaster Rovers, having a goal disallowed for a handball. Jackson scored his first goal for the club two weeks later in a 2-0 victory against Peterborough United. He suffered a knee injury in his 6th game for the club, in February 2026, and was ruled out for a month. After returning to the first team he said he was keen to ensure the club reached the play-offs.

He spoke positively about the club's preparations ahead of the 2026–27 season, his first pre-season with the club. During the pre-season he was used occasionally at right wing back. He also played as a wing back during the season.

== International career ==
Jackson was selected and called up to the England C team in March 2016, to play against Ukraine U23s. Jackson scored the second goal on his international debut in Kyiv later that month, as England C ran out 2–0 winners.

== Playing style ==
Jackson played more as a winger in the 2022–23 season. At Bradford City he also played occasionally as a wing back.

== Career statistics ==
As of match played 21 November 2026

Appearances and goals by club, season and competition
Club	Season	League			FA Cup		League Cup		Other		Total	
Club	Season	Division	Apps	Goals	Apps	Goals	Apps	Goals	Apps	Goals	Apps	Goals
Swindon Town	2013–14	League One	0	0	0	0	0	0	0	0	0	0
Swindon Supermarine (loan)	2013–14	SFL Division One South	10	6	1	0	—		3 (Note: One appearance and three goals in Southern League Cup, two appearances and three goals in FA Trophy)	6	14	12
Oxford City (loan)	2013–14	Conference North	23	8	0	0	—		0	0	23	8
Tamworth	2014–15	Conference North	36	8	2	0	—		0	0	38	8
Wrexham	2015–16	National League	36	4	1	0	—		1 (Note: Appearance in FA Trophy)	0	38	4
Barnsley	2016–17	Championship	0	0	0	0	0	0	—		0	0
Grimsby Town (loan)	2016–17	League Two	20	1	1	0	1	0	2 (Note: Appearance(s) in EFL Trophy)	1	24	2
Accrington Stanley	2017–18	League Two	44	16	2	0	2	0	1	0	49	16
Accrington Stanley	2018–19	League One	1	0	0	0	0	0	0	0	1	0
Accrington Stanley	Total		45	16	2	0	2	0	1	0	50	16
Ipswich Town	2018–19	Championship	36	3	1	0	1	1	—		38	4
Ipswich Town	2019–20	League One	32	11	2	0	1	0	1	0	36	11
Ipswich Town	2020–21	League One	25	1	0	0	0	0	0	0	25	1
Ipswich Town	2021–22	League One	12	3	3	0	1	0	3	2	19	5
Ipswich Town	2022–23	League One	38	3	5	1	1	0	4	0	48	4
Ipswich Town	2023–24	Championship	29	3	0	0	4	0	—		33	3
Ipswich Town	Total		172	24	11	1	8	1	8	2	199	28
Derby County	2024–25	Championship	46	3	1	0	2	1	—		49	4
Derby County	2025–26	Championship	19	0	0	0	2	0	—		21	0
Derby County	Total		65	3	1	0	4	1	0	0	70	4
Bradford City	2025–26	League One	12	3	0	0	0	0	2 (Note: Appearances in the play-offs)	0	14	3
Bradford City	2026–27	League One	14	0	1	0	4	0	0	0	19	0
Bradford City	Total		26	3	1	0	4	0	2	0	33	3
Career total			433	73	20	1	19	2	17	9	489	85

== Honours ==
Accrington Stanley

- EFL League Two: 2017–18

Ipswich Town

- EFL League One runner-up: 2022–23
- EFL Championship runner-up: 2023–24
