= 2018–19 Accrington Stanley F.C. season =

Accrington Stanley F.C.
2018–19 season
- Chairman: Peter Marsden
- Manager: John Coleman
- Stadium: Crown Ground
- League One: 14th
- FA Cup: Fourth round (eliminated by Derby County)
- EFL Cup: First round (eliminated by Mansfield Town)
- EFL Trophy: Third round (eliminated by Bury)
- Top goalscorer: League: Sean McConville (16 Goals); All: Billy Kee (16 Goals), Sean McConville (16 Goals)
- Highest home attendance: 5,397 against Derby County in FA Cup fourth round
- Lowest home attendance: 746 against Lincoln City in EFL Trophy second round
- Average home league attendance: 2,764
- Biggest win: 5–1 vs. Plymouth Argyle (27 April 2019)
- Biggest defeat: 1–6 vs. Mansfield Town (14 August 2018, EFL Cup R1)
Home colours	Away colours

The 2018–19 season was Accrington Stanley's first-ever season in League One and their 50th year in existence. Along with competing in League One, the club also participated in the FA Cup, EFL Cup and EFL Trophy. The season ran from 1 July 2018 to 30 June 2019.

== Transfers ==
=== Transfers in ===
Date from	Position	Nationality	Name	From	Fee	Ref.
1 July 2018	CM	ENG	Sam Finley	AFC Fylde	Free transfer	
1 July 2018	RM	ENG	Piero Mingoia	Cambridge United	Free transfer	
1 July 2018	CB	ENG	Will Wood	Southampton	Free transfer	
2 August 2018	CF	CGO	Offrande Zanzala	Derby County	Undisclosed	
7 August 2018	MF	NIR	Andrew Scott	(Northern Ireland) Maiden City	Undisclosed	
9 August 2018	CF	ENG	Andy Mangan	(Wales) Bala Town	Free transfer	
19 January 2019	GK	BUL	Dimitar Evtimov	Burton Albion	Free transfer	
1 February 2019	RW	ENG	Okera Simmonds	Blackburn Rovers	Free transfer	

=== Transfers out ===
Date from	Position	Nationality	Name	To	Fee	Ref.
1 July 2018	MF	ENG	Josh Hmami	(Wales) The New Saints	Free transfer	
1 July 2018	GK	ENG	Aaron Chapman	Peterborough United	Free Transfer	
1 July 2018	CF	ENG	Akeel Francis	Guiseley	Released	
1 July 2018	RW	ENG	Mekhi Leacock-McLeod	FC Halifax Town	Released	
8 August 2018	MF	ENG	Tom Reilly	(Sweden) Eskilstuna City	Free transfer	
9 August 2018	CF	ENG	Kayden Jackson	Ipswich Town	Undisclosed	
3 January 2019	CB	LCA	Janoi Donacien	Ipswich Town	£750,000	

=== Loans in ===
Start date	Position	Nationality	Name	From	End date	Ref.
3 August 2018	CB	ENG	Matthew Platt	Blackburn Rovers	31 May 2019	
9 August 2018	GK	ENG	Connor Ripley	Middlesbrough	8 January 2019	
17 August 2018	LB	ENG	Nick Anderton	Blackpool	1 January 2019	
24 August 2018	CB	ENG	Michael Ihiekwe	Rotherham United	2 January 2019	
31 August 2018	CM	TUR	Daniel Barlaser	Newcastle United	31 May 2019	
31 August 2018	CF	ENG	Luke Charman	Newcastle United	1 January 2019	
31 August 2018	CF	ENG	Connor Hall	Bolton Wanderers	1 January 2019	
10 January 2019	LB	ENG	Liam Gibson	Newcastle United	31 May 2019	
11 January 2019	CF	ENG	Luke Armstrong	Middlesbrough	31 May 2019	
18 January 2019	CB	LCA	Janoi Donacien	Ipswich Town	31 May 2019	
25 January 2019	CF	NIR	Paul Smyth	Queens Park Rangers	31 May 2019	

=== Loans out ===
Start date	Position	Nationality	Name	To	End date	Ref.
31 July 2018	RB	LCA	Janoi Donacien	Ipswich Town	2 January 2019	
23 August 2018	RB	AUS	Reagan Ogle	Southport	31 May 2019	
31 August 2018	CB	ENG	Zehn Mohammed	Clitheroe	30 September 2018	
5 October 2018	LM	ENG	Danny Williams	AFC Fylde	2 January 2019	
8 October 2018	LW	POR	Érico Sousa	Barrow	10 November 2018	
13 October 2018	CB	ENG	Will Wood	Havant & Waterlooville	12 January 2019	
24 November 2018	DM	NIR	Liam Nolan	Salford City	23 January 2019	
13 December 2018	CB	ENG	Zehn Mohammed	Southport	1 January 2019	
14 December 2018	RB	ENG	Harvey Rodgers	Hartlepool United	14 January 2019	
11 January 2019	CM	ENG	Niall Watson	Widnes	10 February 2019	
15 January 2019	CB	ENG	Zehn Mohammed	FC United of Manchester	31 May 2019	
31 January 2019	RM	ENG	Piero Mingoia	Morecambe	31 May 2019	

== Competitions ==
=== Friendlies ===
Stanley announced pre-season fixtures against Huddersfield Town, Middlesbrough and Blackburn Rovers.

14 July 2018 Friendly	Accrington Stanley	3–0	Huddersfield Town	Accrington
15:00 BST	Jackson 19', 41'; McConville 83'	Report		Stadium: Crown Ground

21 July 2018 Friendly	Accrington Stanley	4–3	Middlesbrough	Accrington
15:00 BST	Hughes; Kee (pen.); Jackson; Sykes	Report	McNair; Howson; Traoré	Stadium: Wham Stadium; Referee: Richard Brooks

24 July 2018 Friendly	Southport	1–1	Accrington Stanley	Blowick
19:30 BST	Lowe 70'	Report	Mingoia 46'	Stadium: Merseyrail Community Stadium

28 July 2018 Friendly	Accrington Stanley	1–0	Blackburn Rovers	Accrington
15:00 BST	Kee 11'	Report		Stadium: Crown Ground

=== League One ===
==== League table ====
Pos	Team	Pld	W	D	L	GF	GA	GD	Pts
12	Oxford United	46	15	15	16	58	64	−6	60
13	Gillingham	46	15	10	21	61	72	−11	55
14	Accrington Stanley	46	14	13	19	51	67	−16	55
15	Bristol Rovers	46	13	15	18	47	50	−3	54
16	Rochdale	46	15	9	22	54	87	−33	54

Source: EFL Official Website
Rules for classification: 1) Points; 2) Goal difference; 3) Number of goals scored; 4) Head-to-head results

==== Result summary ====
Overall								Home						Away					
Pld	W	D	L	GF	GA	GD	Pts	W	D	L	GF	GA	GD	W	D	L	GF	GA	GD
46	14	13	19	51	67	−16	55	7	6	10	26	33	−7	7	7	9	25	34	−9

Last updated: 27 April 2019.
Source: Statto.com

==== Results by matchday ====
Matchday	1	2	3	4	5	6	7	8	9	10	11	12	13	14	15	16	17	18	19	20	21	22	23	24	25	26	27	28	29	30	31	32	33	34	35	36	37	38	39	40	41	42	43	44	45	46
Ground	H	A	H	A	A	H	H	A	H	A	H	A	H	A	A	H	A	H	A	H	A	A	H	H	A	H	A	A	A	A	H	H	H	H	A	A	A	H	H	A	H	H	H	A	H	A
Result	L	W	D	W	D	D	D	D	W	W	W	L	W	W	L	D	D	L	L	L	L	W	W	L	L	D	L	D	L	D	W	D	L	L	L	W	L	L	L	D	L	W	L	W	W	D
Position	23	12	14	7	8	8	10	10	9	8	5	7	6	4	4	6	6	10	10	11	14	10	9	10	12	14	14	15	16	15	14	15	14	15	17	14	17	18	18	17	17	16	16	14	13	14

Updated to match(es) played on 4 May 2019. Source: Statto.com
A = Away; H = Home; W = Win; D = Draw; L = Loss

==== Matches ====
Win Draw Loss

==== August ====
4 August 2018 1	Accrington Stanley	0–2	Gillingham	Accrington
15:00 BST	Clark (yellow card) 45+2'; Sykes (yellow card) 68'	Report	Hanlan 23'; Byrne (yellow card) 39'; Parker 43'	Stadium: Crown Ground; Attendance: 2,201; Referee: Anthony Backhouse

11 August 2018 2	Bristol Rovers	1–2	Accrington Stanley	Horfield
15:00 BST	Payne 83'	Report	McConville 6', 89'; Richards-Everton (yellow card) 86'	Stadium: Memorial Stadium; Attendance: 8,683; Referee: Nick Kinseley

18 August 2018 3	Accrington Stanley	1–1	Charlton Athletic	Accrington
15:00 BST	Richards-Everton (yellow card) 68'; Clark 78'; Sykes (yellow card) 90+6'	Report	Grant 15'; Taylor (yellow card) 29'; Sarr (yellow card) 37'; Bielik (yellow card) 80'	Stadium: Crown Ground; Attendance: 2,265; Referee: Ross Joyce

21 August 2018 4	Oxford United	2–3	Accrington Stanley	Oxford
19:45 BST	Whyte 27'; Browne 57' (yellow card) 65'; Brannagan (yellow card) 60'; Norman (yellow card) 84'	Report	Brown (yellow card) 19'; McConville (yellow card) 34'; Norman 43' (o.g.); Kee 62', 79' (pen.); Clark (yellow card) 80'; Sykes (yellow card) 90+2'; Ripley (yellow card) 90+4'	Stadium: Kassam Stadium; Attendance: 5,748; Referee: Geoff Eltringham

25 August 2018 5	Blackpool	1–1	Accrington Stanley	Blackpool
15:00 BST	Delfouneso 66'	Report	Kee (yellow card) 28'; Hughes 90+3'	Stadium: Bloomfield Road; Attendance: 3,354; Referee: Lee Mason

==== September ====
1 September 2018 6	Accrington Stanley	1–1	Scunthorpe United	Accrington
15:00 BST	Ihiekwe (yellow card) 42'; Conneely 82'; Brown (yellow card) 90+2'	Report	Lund 80'	Stadium: Crown Ground; Attendance: 2,059; Referee: Chris Sarginson

8 September 2018 7	Accrington Stanley	1–1	Burton Albion	Accrington
15:00 BST	Brown (yellow card) 1'; Sykes (yellow card) 43'; Kee 84' (pen.); Finley (yellow card) 89'; Hughes (yellow card) 90+4'	Report	Fraser 11' (yellow card) 78'; Quinn (yellow card) 45+1'	Stadium: Crown Ground; Attendance: 1,943; Referee: Carl Boyeson

15 September 2018 8	Fleetwood Town	1–1	Accrington Stanley	Fleetwood
15:00 BST	Bolger 37'; Coyle (yellow card) 69'	Report	Finley (yellow card) 67'; McConville 69'	Stadium: Highbury Stadium; Attendance: 3,355; Referee: Michael Salisbury

22 September 2018 9	Accrington Stanley	2–1	AFC Wimbledon	Accrington
15:00 BST	Kee 6'; McConville 60'	Report	Wagstaff 64'; Watson (yellow card) 69'; Soares (yellow card) 72'	Stadium: Crown Ground; Attendance: 1,732; Referee: Ross Joyce

29 September 2018 10	Walsall	0–1	Accrington Stanley	Walsall
15:00 BST	Fitzwater (yellow card) 85'	Report	Kee 7' (pen.); McConville (yellow card) 26'; Clark (yellow card) 31'	Stadium: Bescot Stadium; Attendance: 4,257; Referee: Charles Breakspear

==== October ====
2 October 2018 11	Accrington Stanley	1–0	Doncaster Rovers	Accrington
19:45 BST	Ihiekwe (yellow card) 71'; Zanzala 87' (yellow card) 88'	Report	Kane (yellow card) 45+3'; Andrew (yellow card) 65'	Stadium: Crown Ground; Attendance: 2,327; Referee: Peter Wright

6 October 2018 12	Shrewsbury Town	1–0	Accrington Stanley	Shrewsbury
15:00 BST	Grant (yellow card) 56'; Gilliead 62'; Whalley (yellow card) 79'	Report	Ripley (red card) 16'; Clark (yellow card) 53'; Ihiekwe (yellow card) 70'; McConville (yellow card) 88'	Stadium: New Meadow; Attendance: 4,353; Referee: Andy Woolmer

13 October 2018 13	Accrington Stanley	3-1	Bradford City	Accrington
15:00 BST	Kee 39' (pen.); Zanzala 54'; McConville 66'	Report	Nathaniel Knight-Percival (yellow card) 6'; Kai Brünker (yellow card) 56'; Doyle 62'; Ryan McGowan (yellow card) 75'	Stadium: Crown Ground; Attendance: 3,346; Referee: Kevin Johnson

20 October 2018 14	Peterborough United	0-1	Accrington Stanley	Peterborough
15:00 BST	Cummings (yellow card) 59'; O'Hara (yellow card) 77'; Woodyard (yellow card) 88'	Report	McConville 11' (yellow card) 68'; Barlaser (yellow card) 32'; Anderton (yellow card) 87'	Stadium: London Road Stadium; Attendance: 6,141; Referee: Scott Duncan

23 October 2018 15	Luton Town	4–1	Accrington Stanley	Luton
19:45 BST	Hylton 5', 54', 70'; Shinnie 53'; Grant (yellow card) 61'; Bradley (yellow card) 90+5'	Report	Zanzala 27'; Clark (yellow card) 47'; Brown (yellow card) 67'; Hughes (yellow card) 70'	Stadium: Kenilworth Road; Attendance: 8,454; Referee: Chris Sarginson

27 October 2018 16	Accrington Stanley	1–1	Portsmouth	Accrington
15:00 BST	McConville (yellow card) 50'; Ihiekwe 64'	Report	Thompson (yellow card) 47'; Hawkins 62'	Stadium: Crown Ground; Attendance: 3,558; Referee: Steve Martin

==== November ====
3 November 2018 17	Coventry City	1–1	Accrington Stanley	Coventry
15:00 GMT	Doyle 87'	Report	Zanzala 58'	Stadium: Ricoh Arena; Attendance: 10,653; Referee: Michael Salisbury

17 November 2018 18	Accrington Stanley	0–2	Barnsley	Accrington
15:00 GMT	Johnson (yellow card) 68'; Brown (yellow card) 84'	Report	Mowatt (yellow card) 25'; Woodrow 36'; Lindsay (yellow card) 28'; Fryers (yellow card) 34' (yellow-red card) 64'; Moore 90+4'	Stadium: Crown Ground; Attendance: 4,801; Referee: John Busby

24 November 2018 19	Rochdale	1–0	Accrington Stanley	Rochdale
15:00 GMT	Delaney (yellow card) 41'; Henderson 63'; McGahey (yellow card) 72'	Report	Finley (yellow card) 90'	Stadium: Spotland Stadium; Attendance: 3,497; Referee: Lee Probert

27 November 2018 20	Accrington Stanley	1–2	Wycombe Wanderers	Accrington
19:45 GMT	McConville 15'; Finley (yellow card) 41'; Hughes (yellow card) 71'	Report	Kashket 77'; Harriman (yellow card) 88'; Samuel 90+1'	Stadium: Crown Ground; Attendance: 1,740; Referee: Scott Oldham

==== December ====
8 December 2018 A	Accrington Stanley	A–A	Sunderland	Accrington
15:00 GMT	Hall 69'	Report	Maguire 63'	Stadium: Crown Ground; Attendance: 5,257; Referee: Oliver Langford
Note: Referee Oliver Langford abandoned the game on 73 minutes due to waterlogged pitch.

15 December 2018 21	Southend United	3–0	Accrington Stanley	Southend-on-Sea
15:00 GMT	Mantom 19'; Cox 23'; Robinson 72'	Report	Ihiekwe (yellow card) 51'; Finley (yellow card) 63'	Stadium: Roots Hall; Attendance: 6,286; Referee: Antony Coggins

22 December 2018 22	Plymouth Argyle	0–3	Accrington Stanley	Plymouth
15:00 GMT	Fox (yellow card) 8'	Report	Hughes (yellow card) 21'; Conneely (yellow card) 25'; Finley 61'; McConville 65'; Clark 77'; Barlaser (yellow card) 81'	Stadium: Home Park; Attendance: 10,193; Referee: Kevin Johnson

26 December 2018 23	Accrington Stanley	2–1	Shrewsbury Town	Accrington
15:00 GMT	Clark 1' (yellow card) 36'; Kee 21'	Report	Norburn 52' (pen.); Sadler (yellow card) 55'	Stadium: Crown Ground; Attendance: 3,061; Referee: Seb Stockbridge

29 December 2018 24	Accrington Stanley	0–4	Peterborough United	Accrington
15:00 GMT	Hughes (yellow card) 60'	Report	Toney 19', 41', 85'; Maddison (yellow card) 23'; Reed (yellow card) 45+1'; Bennett 67'	Stadium: Crown Ground; Attendance: 2,672; Referee: Thomas Bramall

==== January ====
1 January 2019 25	Bradford City	3–0	Accrington Stanley	Bradford
15:00 GMT	O'Brien 21'; Doyle 30' (yellow card) 78'; O'Connor (yellow card) 45+3'; Wood 49'; McGowan (yellow card) 84'	Report	Ripley (yellow card) 12'; Zanzala (red card) 26'; Clark (yellow card) 39'; Kee (yellow card) 45+4'; Ihiekwe (yellow card) 52'; Richards-Everton (yellow card) 64'; Hughes (yellow card) 90+1'	Stadium: Valley Parade; Attendance: 16,318; Referee: Paul Marsden

12 January 2019 26	Accrington Stanley	0–0	Bristol Rovers	Accrington
15:00 GMT	Sykes (yellow card) 90+2'	Report	Clarke (yellow card) 89'	Stadium: Crown Ground; Attendance: 2,246; Referee: Alan Young

19 January 2019 27	Charlton Athletic	1–0	Accrington Stanley	Charlton
15:00 GMT	Cullen (yellow card) 56'; Taylor (red card) 82'; Grant 90+3' (pen.), (yellow card) 90+4'	Report	Gibson (yellow card) 32'; Finley (yellow card) 39'; Johnson (yellow card) 59'; Maxted (red card) 82'; Hughes (yellow card) 90+5'	Stadium: The Valley; Attendance: 11,877; Referee: John Busby

29 January 2019 28	Gillingham	0–0	Accrington Stanley	Gillingham
19:45 GMT	Ehmer (yellow card) 56'	Report	Smyth (yellow card) 85'	Stadium: Priestfield Stadium; Attendance: 3,423; Referee: Craig Hicks

==== February ====
2 February 2019 P	Accrington Stanley	P–P	Blackpool	Accrington
15:00 GMT		Report		Stadium: Crown Ground
Note: Fixture was postponed due to freezing weather overnight.

9 February 2019 29	Scunthorpe United	2–0	Accrington Stanley	Scunthorpe
15:00 GMT	Wootton 13' (yellow card) 45+1' van Veen 42' (yellow card) 54'; Burgess (yellow card) 83'	Report	Donacien (yellow card) 51'; Barlaser (yellow card) 68'	Stadium: Glanford Park; Attendance: 4,824; Referee: Antony Coggins

15 February 2019 30	Sunderland	2–2	Accrington Stanley	Sunderland
19:45 GMT	Baldwin (yellow card) 35'; Honeyman 55'; McGeady 62'	Report	Kee 30' (pen.); Conneely (yellow card) 42'; Smyth 52'	Stadium: Stadium of Light; Attendance: 28,937; Referee: Darren Drysdale

19 February 2019 31	Accrington Stanley	4–2	Oxford United	Accrington
19:45 GMT	Kee 36'; Richards-Everton (yellow card) 39'; McConville 57' (yellow card) 70'; Clark 73'; Armstrong 90+4'	Report	Brannagan (yellow card) 44'; Garbutt 63'; Mousinho 89'	Stadium: Crown Ground; Attendance: 2,095; Referee: Christopher Sarginson

23 February 2019 32	Accrington Stanley	1–1	Southend United	Accrington
15:00 GMT	Kee (yellow card) 30'; Barlaser 60'; Clark (yellow card) 79'	Report	Humphrys 20'; Cox (yellow card) 36'; Klass (yellow card) 41'	Stadium: Crown Ground; Attendance: 2,472; Referee: Eddie Ilderton

==== March ====
2 March 2019 33	Accrington Stanley	0–1	Coventry City	Accrington
15:00 GMT	Gibson (yellow card) 73'; Johnson (yellow card) 81'	Report	Enobakhare 60'	Stadium: Crown Ground; Attendance: 3,083; Referee: Peter Wright

5 March 2019 34	Accrington Stanley	1–2	Blackpool	Accrington
19:45 GMT	McConville (yellow card) 12'; Armstrong 23'; Donacien (yellow card) 73'; Evtimov (red card) 83'; Wood (yellow card) 88'; Hughes (yellow card) 90'	Report	Virtue 5'; Dodoo (yellow card) 30'; Spearing 81' (pen.)	Stadium: Crown Ground; Attendance: 3,792; Referee: Ross Joyce

9 March 2019 35	Barnsley	2–0	Accrington Stanley	Barnsley
15:00 GMT	Cavaré 41'; Wood 45+1' (o.g.); Pinillos (yellow card) 62'	Report	McConville (yellow card) 26'	Stadium: Oakwell; Attendance: 11,533; Referee: Dean Whitestone

12 March 2019 36	Wycombe Wanderers	1–3	Accrington Stanley	High Wycombe
19:45 GMT	Cowan-Hall 23'; Allsop (yellow card) 45+10'	Report	Barlaser (yellow card) 45'; Kee 45+10' (pen.), 66' (pen.); Smyth 71'	Stadium: Adams Park; Attendance: 3,819; Referee: Kevin Johnson

16 March 2019 P	Accrington Stanley	P–P	Rochdale	Accrington
15:00 GMT		Report		Stadium: Crown Ground
Note: Fixture was postponed due to a waterlogged pitch.

23 March 2019 37	Burton Albion	5–2	Accrington Stanley	Burton upon Trent
15:00 GMT	Collins (yellow card) 39'; Fraser 44'; Templeton (yellow card) 65' (goal) 82'; McFadzean 68'; Akins 78' (pen.), 90' (pen.); Quinn (yellow card) 90+5'	Report	McConville 37'; Kee 40' (pen.); Clark (yellow card) 58'	Stadium: Pirelli Stadium; Attendance: 2,916; Referee: Lee Swabey

30 March 2019 38	Accrington Stanley	0–1	Fleetwood Town	Accrington
15:00 GMT	Donacien (yellow card) 28'; McConville (yellow card) 80'	Report	Rydel (yellow card) 30'; Sheron (yellow card) 45'; Souttar 50'; Evans (yellow card) 89'	Stadium: Crown Ground; Attendance: 2,485; Referee: Anthony Backhouse

==== April ====
3 April 2019 39	Accrington Stanley	0–3	Sunderland	Accrington
19:45 BST	Richards-Everton (yellow card) 15'; Finley (yellow card) 32'; Hughes (yellow card) 75'; Kee (yellow card) 86'	Report	McGeady 4'; O'Nien (yellow card) 30'; Grigg 45+3'; Wyke (yellow card) 63'; Sterling 79'	Stadium: Crown Ground; Attendance: 3,802; Referee: John Brooks

6 April 2019 40	AFC Wimbledon	1–1	Accrington Stanley	Kingston upon Thames
15:00 BST	Piggott 21'; Kalambayi (yellow card) 37'; Hanson (yellow card) 71'; Connolly (yellow card) 78'	Report	Smyth (yellow card) 4'; Brown (yellow card) 29'; Clark 34', (yellow card) 70'	Stadium: Kingsmeadow; Attendance: 4,565; Referee: Neil Hair

9 April 2019 41	Accrington Stanley	0–1	Rochdale	Accrington
19:45 BST		Report	McLaughlin (yellow card) 27'; Henderson (yellow card) 39'; Rathbone 71'; Hamilton (yellow card) 78'	Stadium: Crown Ground; Attendance: 2,824; Referee: Christopher Sarginson

13 April 2019 42	Accrington Stanley	2–1	Walsall	Accrington
15:00 BST	Sykes 11', 69'; Finley (yellow card) 37'	Report	Devlin 33'; Kinsella (yellow card) 45+1'; Scarr (yellow card) 80'; Gordon (yellow card) 81' (yellow-red card) 84'; Cook (yellow card) 84'; Leahy (yellow card) 88'	Stadium: Crown Ground; Attendance: 2,662; Referee: Eddie Ilderton

20 April 2019 43	Accrington Stanley	0–3	Luton Town	Accrington
17:30 BST	Evtimov (yellow card) 3' (yellow-red card) 22'; Conneely (yellow card) 32'; Armstrong (yellow card) 86'	Report	Berry (yellow card) 17'; Collins 24' (pen.); Ruddock-Mpanzu 68', 87'	Stadium: Crown Ground; Attendance: 3,271; Referee: Carl Boyeson

23 April 2019 44	Doncaster Rovers	1–2	Accrington Stanley	Doncaster
19:45 BST	Andrew 90'; Sadlier (yellow card) 90+2'	Report	McConville 17'; Smyth 44'	Stadium: Keepmoat Stadium; Attendance: 7,222; Referee: Sebastian Stockbridge

27 April 2019 45	Accrington Stanley	5–1	Plymouth Argyle	Accrington
15:00 BST	Kee 20' (pen.); McConville 36', 43', 51'; Armstrong 66'	Report	Rodgers 90+3' (o.g.)	Stadium: Crown Ground; Attendance: 3,134; Referee: Craig Hicks

==== May ====
4 May 2019 46	Portsmouth	1–1	Accrington Stanley	Portsmouth
17:30 BST	Close 59'	Report	McConville 46'	Stadium: Fratton Park; Attendance: 18,439; Referee: Scott Duncan

=== FA Cup ===
The first round draw was made live on BBC by Dennis Wise and Dion Dublin on 22 October. The draw for the second round was made live on BBC and BT by Mark Schwarzer and Glenn Murray on 12 November. The third round draw was made live on BBC by Ruud Gullit and Paul Ince from Stamford Bridge on 3 December 2018. The fourth round draw was made live on BBC by Robbie Keane and Carl Ikeme from Wolverhampton on 7 January 2019.

10 November 2018 First round	Accrington Stanley	1–0	Colchester United	Accrington
15:00 BST	Barlaser 34'	Report	Kent (yellow card) 47'; Nouble (yellow card) 76'	Stadium: Crown Ground; Attendance: 1,267; Referee: Martin Coy

1 December 2018 Second round	Accrington Stanley	3–1	Cheltenham Town	Accrington
15:00 GMT	Zanzala 49'; Kee 66' (pen.); Clark 78'	Report	Forster (yellow card) 47'; Addai 73'; Tozer (yellow card) 90+1'	Stadium: Crown Ground; Attendance: 1,066; Referee: Andy Haines

5 January 2019 Third round	Accrington Stanley	1–0	Ipswich Town	Accrington
15:00 GMT	Kee 76'	Report	Downes (yellow card) 25'	Stadium: Crown Ground; Attendance: 2,869; Referee: Dean Whitestone

26 January 2019 Fourth round	Accrington Stanley	0–1	Derby County	Accrington
12:30 GMT	Barlaser (yellow card) 3' (yellow-red card) 59'	Report	Waghorn 78'; Bogle (yellow card) 86' (red card) 90'; Jozefzoon (yellow card) 90+3'; Nugent (yellow card) 90+4'	Stadium: Crown Ground; Attendance: 5,397; Referee: Jonathan Moss

=== EFL Cup ===
On 15 June 2018, the draw for the first round was made in Vietnam.

14 August 2018 First round	Mansfield Town	6–1	Accrington Stanley	Mansfield
19:45 BST	Walker 9' (pen.), 13' (pen.), 45+2'; Khan 16'; Mellis (yellow card) 28'; Benning (yellow card) 41'; Rose 66'; Hamilton 90+4'	Report	Finley 6'; Conneely (yellow card) 26'; Mingoia (yellow card) 29'; Platt (yellow card) 45'	Stadium: Field Mill; Attendance: 1,565; Referee: Seb Stockbridge

=== EFL Trophy ===
On 13 July 2018, the initial group stage draw bar the U21 invited clubs was announced. The draw for the second round was made live on Talksport by Leon Britton and Steve Claridge on 16 November. On 8 December, the third round draw was drawn by Alan McInally and Matt Le Tissier on Soccer Saturday.

Pos	Lge	Team	Pld	W	PW	PL	L	GF	GA	GD	Pts	Qualification
1	L1	Accrington Stanley	3	2	0	0	1	8	5	+3	6	Round 2
2	L2	Macclesfield Town	3	1	1	0	1	6	8	−2	5	Round 2
3	L1	Blackpool	3	1	0	1	1	7	7	0	4	
4	ACA	West Bromwich Albion U21	3	1	0	0	2	4	5	−1	3	

Source: EFL.com

9 October 2018 Group stages	Accrington Stanley	4–1	Macclesfield Town	Accrington
19:45 BST	Finley 35'; Zanzala 63'; Fitzpatrick 80' (o.g.); Barlaser 90+5'	Report	Rose (yellow card) 45+1'; Vincenti 58'; Kelleher (yellow card) 63'	Stadium: Crown Ground; Attendance: 900; Referee: Thomas Bramall

6 November 2018 Group stages	Accrington Stanley	2–1	West Bromwich Albion U21	Accrington
19:45 GMT	Clark 49'; Sykes 90+2'	Report	Leko 62'	Stadium: Crown Ground; Attendance: 772; Referee: Peter Wright

13 November 2018 Group stages	Blackpool	3–2	Accrington Stanley	Blackpool
19:45 GMT	Dodoo 30', 41'; Gnanduillet 67'; O'Sullivan (yellow card) 72'; Pritchard (yellow card) 79'	Report	Hall 17', 90+1' (pen.); Sykes (yellow card) 54'	Stadium: Bloomfield Road; Attendance: 781; Referee: Oliver Yates

4 December 2018 Second round	Accrington Stanley	2–2 (4–2 p)	Lincoln City	Accrington
19:45 GMT	Brown 7' (yellow card) 60'; Sykes (yellow card) 11'; Richards-Everton (yellow card) 43'; Clark 70'; Barlaser (yellow card) 82'	Report	Green 7'; Eardley (yellow card) 24'; McCombe 61'; Chapman (yellow card) 71'; Rhead (penalty missed) 66' (yellow card) 78'	Stadium: Crown Ground; Attendance: 746; Referee: Anthony Backhouse
	Penalties
	Hall (penalty scored); Zanzala (penalty scored); McConville (penalty scored); Barlaser (penalty missed); Clark (penalty scored)		Gordon (penalty missed); Chapman (penalty scored); Green (penalty missed); Rhead (penalty scored)

8 January 2019 Third round	Accrington Stanley	2–4	Bury	Accrington
19:45 GMT	Clark 10'; Kee 38'; Zanzala (yellow card) 42'	Report	Telford 55', 74'; Maynard 57'; Thompson (yellow card) 76'; Mayor 84'	Stadium: Crown Ground; Attendance: 1,136; Referee: Matt Donohue

== Statistics ==
=== Appearances and goals ===
As of 4 May 2019

No.	Pos	Nat	Player	Total		League One		FA Cup		League Cup		EFL Trophy	
No.	Pos	Nat	Player	Apps	Goals	Apps	Goals	Apps	Goals	Apps	Goals	Apps	Goals
Goalkeepers
1	GK	(Republic of Ireland) IRL	Jonny Maxted	26	0	16+3	0	1	0	1	0	5	0
30	GK	(Bulgaria) BUL	Dimitar Evtimov	10	0	9+1	0	0	0	0	0	0	0
34	GK	(Trinidad and Tobago) TTO	Tony Warner	0	0	0	0	0	0	0	0	0	0
Defenders
2	DF	(England) ENG	Callum Johnson	44	0	40	0	4	0	0	0	0	0
3	DF	(England) ENG	Mark Hughes	52	1	46	1	4	0	1	0	1	0
4	DF	(Saint Lucia) LCA	Janoi Donacien	19	0	18	0	1	0	0	0	0	0
5	DF	(England) ENG	Ben Richards-Everton	20	4	13+2	4	0	0	0	0	5	0
15	DF	(England) ENG	Ross Sykes	20	4	13+1	3	2	0	0	0	4	1
16	DF	(England) ENG	Will Wood	6	0	1+3	0	0	0	1	0	1	0
18	DF	(England) ENG	Harvey Rodgers	7	0	5+1	0	0	0	1	0	0	0
20	DF	(Australia) AUS	Reagan Ogle	0	0	0	0	0	0	0	0	0	0
21	DF	(England) ENG	Zehn Mohammed	1	0	0	0	0	0	0	0	1	0
33	DF	(England) ENG	Liam Gibson	3	0	2+1	0	0	0	0	0	0	0
Midfielders
6	MF	(Northern Ireland) NIR	Liam Nolan	4	0	0+2	0	0	0	0+1	0	0+1	0
7	MF	(England) ENG	Jordan Clark	54	9	44	5	4	1	0+1	0	3+2	3
8	MF	(England) ENG	Scott Brown	37	1	18+11	0	0+3	0	1	0	4	1
11	MF	(England) ENG	Sean McConville	53	16	45	16	4	0	1	0	2+1	0
12	MF	(England) ENG	Danny Williams	1	0	0+1	0	0	0	0	0	0	0
14	MF	(England) ENG	Sam Finley	44	3	32+5	1	3	0	1	1	1+2	1
17	MF	(Portugal) POR	Érico Sousa	4	0	0+3	0	0	0	0	0	0+1	0
22	MF	(England) ENG	Piero Mingoia	11	0	2+1	0	0+2	0	1	0	3+2	0
26	MF	(England) ENG	Daniel Barlaser	46	4	33+7	2	4	1	0	0	1+1	1
28	MF	(Republic of Ireland) IRL	Seamus Conneely	33	2	25+2	2	2	0	0	0	4	0
Forwards
9	FW	(Republic of the Congo) CGO	Offrande Zanzala	32	6	12+15	4	0+1	1	1	0	3	1
10	FW	(England) ENG	Okera Simmonds	0	0	0	0	0	0	0	0	0	0
23	FW	(Northern Ireland) NIR	Andrew Scott	2	0	0	0	0	0	0	0	0+2	0
29	FW	(Northern Ireland) NIR	Billy Kee	49	16	42+2	13	4	2	0	0	1	1
38	FW	(Northern Ireland) NIR	Paul Smyth	15	1	11+3	1	0+1	0	0	0	0	0
39	FW	(England) ENG	Luke Armstrong	14	2	6+8	2	0	0	0	0	0	0
Players transferred out during the season
4	DF	(England) ENG	Michael Ihiekwe	23	1	20	1	2	0	0	0	1	0
10	FW	(England) ENG	Kayden Jackson	1	0	1	0	0	0	0	0	0	0
10	FW	(England) ENG	Connor Hall	19	2	1+15	0	0	0	0	0	3	2
19	FW	(England) ENG	Andy Mangan	5	0	0+2	0	1	0	0+1	0	1	0
24	DF	(England) ENG	Nick Wilmer-Anderton	25	0	20+2	0	0	0	0	0	3	0
25	DF	(England) ENG	Matthew Platt	5	0	0	0	0	0	1	0	4	0
27	FW	(England) ENG	Luke Charman	4	0	0	0	1	0	0	0	3	0
30	GK	(England) ENG	Connor Ripley	24	0	21	0	3	0	0	0	0	0

=== Disciplinary record ===
As of 4 May 2019

Rank	Position	Name	League One		FA Cup		EFL Cup		EFL Trophy		Total	
Rank	Position	Name	Yellow card	Red card	Yellow card	Red card	Yellow card	Red card	Yellow card	Red card	Yellow card	Red card
1	MF	(England) Jordan Clark	10	0	0	0	0	0	0	0	10	0
2	MF	(England) Sean McConville	9	0	0	0	0	0	0	0	9	0
2	DF	(England) Mark Hughes	9	0	0	0	0	0	0	0	9	0
4	MF	(England) Sam Finley	8	0	0	0	0	0	0	0	8	0
5	DF	(England) Scott Brown	6	0	0	0	0	0	1	0	7	0
5	DF	(England) Ross Sykes	5	0	0	0	0	0	2	0	7	0
7	MF	(England) Daniel Barlaser	4	0	1	1	0	0	1	0	6	1
7	DF	(England) Ben Richards-Everton	5	0	0	0	0	0	1	0	6	0
9	DF	(England) Michael Ihiekwe	5	0	0	0	0	0	0	0	5	0
10	FW	(Northern Ireland) Billy Kee	4	0	0	0	0	0	0	0	4	0
10	MF	(Republic of Ireland) Seamus Conneely	3	0	0	0	1	0	0	0	4	0
12	DF	(England) Callum Johnson	3	0	0	0	0	0	0	0	3	0
13	GK	(England) Connor Ripley	2	1	0	0	0	0	0	0	2	1
13	FW	(Republic of the Congo) Offrande Zanzala	1	1	0	0	0	0	1	0	2	1
13	DF	(Saint Lucia) Janoi Donacien	2	0	0	0	0	0	0	0	2	0
13	MF	(England) Liam Gibson	2	0	0	0	0	0	0	0	2	0
13	FW	(Northern Ireland) Paul Smyth	2	0	0	0	0	0	0	0	2	0
18	GK	(Republic of Ireland) Jonny Maxted	0	1	0	0	0	0	0	0	0	1
18	GK	(Bulgaria) Dimitar Evtimov	1	2	0	0	0	0	0	0	1	2
18	MF	(England) Piero Mingoia	0	0	0	0	1	0	0	0	1	0
18	DF	(England) Matthew Platt	0	0	0	0	1	0	0	0	1	0
18	MF	(England) Nick Wilmer-Anderton	1	0	0	0	0	0	0	0	1	0
18	DF	(England) Will Wood	1	0	0	0	0	0	0	0	1	0
18	FW	(England) Luke Armstrong	1	0	0	0	0	0	0	0	1	0
18	Total		84	5	1	1	3	0	6	0	94	6
