= 2017–18 Accrington Stanley F.C. season =

Accrington Stanley
2017–18 season
- Chairman: Peter Marsden
- Manager: John Coleman
- Stadium: Crown Ground
- League Two: 1st (promoted)
- FA Cup: First round (knocked out by Guiseley)
- EFL Cup: Second round (knocked out by West Bromwich Albion)
- EFL Trophy: Second round (knocked out by Lincoln City)
- Top goalscorer: League: Billy Kee (25 Goals); All: Billy Kee (26 Goals)
- Highest home attendance: 4,753 against Lincoln City (League 2)
- Lowest home attendance: 587 against Middlesbrough U21s (EFL Trophy Group Stage)
Home colours	Away colours	Third colours

The 2017–18 season was Accrington Stanley's twelfth consecutive season in League Two and their 49th year in existence. Along with competing in League Two, the club also participated in the FA Cup, EFL Cup and EFL Trophy. The season covers the period from 1 July 2017 to 30 June 2018.

== Transfers ==
=== Transfers in ===
Date from	Position	Nationality	Name	From	Fee	Ref.
1 July 2017	LW	ENG	Mekhi Leacock-McLeod	Billericay Town	Free	
1 July 2017	DM	NIR	Liam Nolan	Southport	Undisclosed	
1 July 2017	RW	POR	Érico Sousa	Tranmere Rovers	Free	
15 July 2017	CB	ENG	Ben Richards-Everton	Dunfermline Athletic	Free	
21 July 2017	CF	ENG	Kayden Jackson	Barnsley	Undisclosed	
4 August 2017	GK	DEN	Simon Bloch Jørgensen	Brønshøj	Free	
5 January 2018	RB	ENG	Callum Johnson	Middlesbrough	Undisclosed	
11 January 2018	CF	ENG	Akeel Francis	Rotherham United	Free	
12 January 2018	LW	ENG	Danny Williams	Dundee	Free	
19 January 2018	GK	ENG	Jonny Maxted	Guiseley	Undisclosed	
31 January 2018	DM	ENG	Harvey Rodgers	Fleetwood Town	Undisclosed	

=== Transfers out ===
Date from	Position	Nationality	Name	To	Fee	Ref.
1 July 2017	LM	WAL	Arron Davies	Free agent	Released	
1 July 2017	CF	ENG	Terry Gornell	Chorley	Mutual consent	(Note: Terry Gornell joined Chorley following his departure.)
1 July 2017	CM	ENG	Steven Hewitt	Bangor City	Released	(Note: Steven Hewitt joined Bangor City following release.)
1 July 2017	CM	ENG	Paddy Lacey	Free agent	Released	
1 July 2017	SS	NIR	Shay McCartan	Bradford City	Undisclosed	
1 July 2017	GK	ENG	Elliot Parish	Dundee	Released	(Note: Elliot Parish joined Dundee following his release.)
1 July 2017	CF	ENG	Brayden Shaw	Bangor City	Free Transfer	
1 July 2017	LW	ENG	Luke Wall	Bangor City	Released	(Note: Luke Wall joined Bangor City following his release.)
1 July 2017	CF	ENG	Nathan Webb	Free agent	Released	
4 August 2017	RB	ENG	Matty Pearson	Barnsley	Undisclosed	
22 August 2017	CB	ENG	Omar Beckles	Shrewsbury Town	Undisclosed	
15 September 2017	GK	DEN	Simon Bloch Jørgensen	Whitehawk	Free	

=== Loans in ===
Start date	Position	Nationality	Name	From	End date	Ref.
3 July 2017	CF	ENG	Jonathan Edwards	Hull City	3 January 2018	
4 August 2017	CB	ENG	Tom Dallison	Brighton & Hove Albion	18 October 2017	
4 August 2017	RB	ENG	Tyler Hornby-Forbes	Brighton & Hove Albion	15 November 2017	
24 August 2017	CF	ENG	Mallik Wilks	Leeds United	3 January 2018	
29 August 2017	CB	ENG	Jordan Thorniley	Sheffield Wednesday	3 January 2018	
31 August 2017	RB	ENG	Callum Johnson	Middlesbrough	4 January 2018	
31 August 2017	CB	ENG	Farrend Rawson	Derby County	3 January 2018	
31 August 2017	GK	POL	Max Stryjek	Sunderland	18 January 2018	
4 January 2018	CB	IRE	Jimmy Dunne	Burnley	30 May 2018	
11 January 2018	CF	CGO	Offrande Zanzala	Derby County	30 May 2018	
12 January 2018	CB	ENG	Charlie Rowan	Watford	30 May 2018	

=== Loans out ===
Start date	Position	Nationality	Name	To	End date	Ref.
5 October 2017	CB	ENG	Ross Sykes	Southport	24 November 2017	

== Competitions ==
=== Pre-season friendlies ===
As of 8 June 2017, Accrington Stanley have announced five pre-season friendlies against Southport, Preston North End, Oldham Athletic, Huddersfield Town and Everton XI.

Win Draw Loss

12 July 2017	Accrington Stanley	0–1	Huddersfield Town	Accrington
19:00 BST		Report	Ince 56'	Stadium: Crown Ground

15 July 2017	Accrington Stanley	3–3	Everton XI	Accrington
15:00 BST	Kee 3' (pen.); Edwards 64'; 70' (o.g.)	Report	Henen 44'; Bowler 45'; Bramall	Stadium: Crown Ground

19 July 2017	Accrington Stanley	2–3	Preston North End	Accrington
19:30 BST	Edwards 58'; Pearson 87'	Report	Browne 37'; Robinson 42'; Cunningham 75'	Stadium: Crown Ground; Attendance: 989

22 July 2017	Accrington Stanley	2–2	Oldham Athletic	Accrington
15:00 BST	Kee 17'; McLeod 72'	Report	Davies 55' (pen.); Duffus 86'	Stadium: Crown Ground; Attendance: 921

29 July 2017	Southport	0–5	Accrington Stanley	Blowick
15:00 BST		Report	Kee 12', 30' (pen.), 32'; Dugdale (o.g.); Conneely 15'	Stadium: Haig Avenue; Attendance: 474

=== League Two ===
==== League table ====
Pos	Team	Pld	W	D	L	GF	GA	GD	Pts	Promotion, qualification or relegation
1	Accrington Stanley (C, P)	46	29	6	11	76	46	+30	93	Promotion to EFL League One
2	Luton Town (P)	46	25	13	8	94	46	+48	88	Promotion to EFL League One
3	Wycombe Wanderers (P)	46	24	12	10	79	60	+19	84	Promotion to EFL League One
4	Exeter City	46	24	8	14	64	54	+10	80	Qualification for League Two play-offs (Note: Four teams play for one spot and promotion to EFL League One.)
5	Notts County	46	21	14	11	71	48	+23	77	Qualification for League Two play-offs

Source: BBC Sport
Rules for classification: 1) Points; 2) Goal difference; 3) Number of goals scored
(C) Champions; (P) Promoted

==== Result summary ====
Overall								Home						Away					
Pld	W	D	L	GF	GA	GD	Pts	W	D	L	GF	GA	GD	W	D	L	GF	GA	GD
46	29	6	11	76	46	+30	93	17	3	3	42	19	+23	12	3	8	34	27	+7

Last updated: 5 May 2018.
Source: Statto.com

==== Results by matchday ====
Matchday	1	2	3	4	5	6	7	8	9	10	11	12	13	14	15	16	17	18	19	20	21	22	23	24	25	26	27	28	29	30	31	32	33	34	35	36	37	38	39	40	41	42	43	44	45	46
Ground	H	A	H	A	A	H	H	A	H	A	A	H	H	A	A	H	A	H	H	A	A	H	A	H	H	A	H	A	H	H	A	H	A	H	H	A	H	A	H	A	H	H	A	A	H	A
Result	W	L	W	D	W	W	L	W	D	W	W	L	W	L	W	W	D	D	W	L	L	L	L	W	W	W	W	L	W	W	W	W	D	W	W	W	W	W	W	W	D	W	W	L	W	L
Position	3	9	6	1	3	2	3	3	4	3	3	6	4	5	3	2	2	3	3	3	5	7	9	7	4	3	3	5	5	3	2	2	3	2	2	1	1	1	1	1	1	1	1	1	1	1

Updated to match(es) played on 5 May 2018. Source: Statto.com
A = Away; H = Home; W = Win; D = Draw; L = Loss

==== Matches ====
Win Draw Loss

On 21 June 2017, the league fixtures were announced.

==== August ====
5 August 2017 1	Accrington Stanley	3–1	Colchester United	Accrington
15:00 BST	Jackson 9'; Kee 32'; Clark (yellow card) 42'; Beckles 64'	Report	Lapslie (yellow card) 45+1'; Jackson (yellow card) 67'; Szmodics 81'	Stadium: Crown Ground; Attendance: 1,625; Referee: Ross Joyce

12 August 2017 2	Yeovil Town	3–2	Accrington Stanley	Yeovil
15:00 BST	Zoko (yellow card) 25', (goal) 38'; Olomola 26', 39'	Report	Jackson 12', 53'; Dallison (yellow card) 68'; Donacien (yellow card) 83'	Stadium: Huish Park; Attendance: 2,464; Referee: Chris Sarginson

19 August 2017 3	Accrington Stanley	2–1	Mansfield Town	Accrington
15:00 BST	Jackson 10'; Hughes (yellow card) 30'; Kee 90+2'	Report	Angol 25'; Pearce (yellow card) 90'	Stadium: Crown Ground; Attendance: 1,645; Referee: Darren Bond

25 August 2017 4	Notts County	2–2	Accrington Stanley	Nottingham
19:45 BST	Stead 33' (pen.); Grant 54'; Duffy (yellow card) 58'; Hewitt (yellow card) 63'; Tootle (yellow card) 80' (yellow-red card) 90+1'	Report	Hughes 58'; Donacien (yellow card) 65'; Leacock-McLeod (red card) 66'; Wilks (yellow card) 90+1' (goal) 90+4'	Stadium: Meadow Lane; Attendance: 6,087; Referee: Carl Boyeson

==== September ====
2 September 2017 5	Morecambe	1–2	Accrington Stanley	Morecambe
15:00 BST	Oliver (red card) 57'; Brough (yellow card) 60'; Campbell (yellow card) 62'; Müller (yellow card) 76'; Ellison 90+5'	Report	Kee 31'; Jackson (yellow card) 63'; Clark 90'	Stadium: Globe Arena; Attendance: 2,059; Referee: Peter Bankes

9 September 2017 6	Accrington Stanley	3–0	Carlisle United	Accrington
15:00 BST	Kee 17'; McConville 43', 57'	Report	Miller (yellow card) 42'	Stadium: Crown Ground; Attendance: 2,120; Referee: David Webb

12 September 2017 7	Accrington Stanley	1–2	Grimsby Town	Accrington
19:45 BST	Jackson 45'; Hughes (yellow card) 65'; Wilks (yellow card) 90+2'	Report	Davies (yellow card) 12'; Jones 43'; Woolford 47'; Matt (yellow card) 57'; Dembélé (yellow card) 73'	Stadium: Crown Ground; Attendance: 1,288; Referee: Robert Jones

16 September 2017 8	Chesterfield	1–2	Accrington Stanley	Chesterfield
15:00 BST	Barry (yellow card) 35' (yellow-red card) 63'; Flores (yellow card) 44'; DeGirolamo (yellow card) 59'; Reed (yellow card) 72'; Dennis 77'	Report	Conneely (yellow card) 41'; Kee 68'; McConville (yellow card) 78'; Wilks 82'; Donacien (yellow card) 90+6'	Stadium: Proact Stadium; Attendance: 4,487; Referee: Craig Hicks

23 September 2017 9	Accrington Stanley	1–1	Cheltenham Town	Accrington
15:00 BST	Jackson 39'; Hornby-Forbes (yellow card) 82'	Report	Eisa 37'; Cranston (yellow card) 86'	Stadium: Crown Ground; Attendance: 1,321; Referee: Andy Haines

26 September 2017 10	Port Vale	1–2	Accrington Stanley	Burslem
19:45 BST	Worrall 22'; Kay (yellow card) 50'	Report	Kee 36', 62'; Rawson (yellow card) 86'	Stadium: Vale Park; Attendance: 3,360; Referee: Eddie Ilerton

30 September 2017 11	Forest Green Rovers	0–1	Accrington Stanley	Nailsworth
15:00 BST		Report	Conneely 56'; Thorniley (yellow card) 70'	Stadium: The New Lawn; Attendance: 2,594; Referee: John Busby

==== October ====
7 October 2017 12	Accrington Stanley	0–2	Luton Town	Accrington
15:00 BST	Donacien (yellow card) 44'; Conneely (yellow card) 45+1'	Report	Collins 22'; Potts (yellow card) 33'; Hylton 44'	Stadium: Crown Ground; Attendance: 2,193; Referee: Martin Coy

14 October 2017 13	Accrington Stanley	1–0	Coventry City	Accrington
15:00 BST	McConville 14'; Richards-Everton (yellow card) 64'; Thorniley (yellow card) 89'; Donacien (yellow card) 89'	Report	Stevenson (yellow card) 27'; Grimmer (yellow card) 90'	Stadium: Crown Ground; Attendance: 2,828; Referee: Seb Stockbridge

17 October 2017 14	Stevenage	3–2	Accrington Stanley	Stevenage
19:45 BST	Godden 61', 83'; Smith (yellow card) 71'; Kennedy 89'	Report	Clark 19'; Jackson (yellow card) 56'; Kee 64'	Stadium: Lamex Stadium; Attendance: 1,788; Referee: Gavin Ward

21 October 2017 15	Crewe Alexandra	0–2	Accrington Stanley	Crewe
15:00 BST	Raynes (yellow card) 2' (yellow-red card) 83'; Lowery (yellow card) 86'	Report	Kee 3'; Clark 11'; Conneely (yellow card) 77'	Stadium: Gresty Road; Attendance: 3,849; Referee: Anthony Backhouse

28 October 2017 16	Accrington Stanley	4–1	Barnet	Accrington
15:00 BST	McConville 35'; Clark 51'; Kee 59'; Jackson 65'	Report	Nelson (yellow card) 32'; Campbell-Ryce 54'	Stadium: Crown Ground; Attendance: 1,485; Referee: Mark Heywood

==== November ====
11 November 2017 17	Cambridge United	0–0	Accrington Stanley	Cambridge
15:00 GMT	Ikpeazu (yellow card) 90'; Halliday (yellow card) 90+4'	Report	Kee (yellow card) 24'; Johnson (yellow card) 61'; Thorniley (yellow card) 69'; Conneely (yellow card) 81'	Stadium: Abbey Stadium; Attendance: 4,402; Referee: Graham Horwood

18 November 2017 18	Accrington Stanley	1–1	Newport County	Accrington
15:00 GMT	Wilks 88'	Report	Nouble 48'; Tozer (yellow card) 90'	Stadium: Crown Ground; Attendance: 1,371; Referee: Darren Drysdale

21 November 2017 19	Accrington Stanley	1–0	Wycombe Wanderers	Accrington
19:45 GMT	Hughes 70'; Brown (yellow card) 86'	Report	El-Abd (yellow card) 33'; Bean (yellow card) 54'	Stadium: Crown Ground; Attendance: 1,119; Referee: Ross Joyce

25 November 2017 20	Exeter City	2–0	Accrington Stanley	Exeter
15:00 GMT	James (yellow card) 36'; Boateng 45+2'; Taylor (yellow card) 63'; Sweeney 86' (pen.)	Report		Stadium: St James Park; Attendance: 3,597; Referee: John Brooks

==== December ====
9 December 2017 P	Accrington Stanley	v	Swindon Town	Accrington
15:00 GMT				Stadium: Crown Ground
Note: On matchday, the decision was made to postpone the Swindon Town fixture due to player safety.

16 December 2017 21	Lincoln City	2–0	Accrington Stanley	Lincoln
15:00 GMT	Rhead (yellow card) 39' (goal) 56'; Green 45' (pen.)	Report	Rawson (red card) 45+1'; Brown (yellow card) 90+2'	Stadium: Sincil Bank; Attendance: 7,696; Referee: Seb Stockbridge

23 December 2017 22	Accrington Stanley	2–3	Crawley Town	Accrington
15:00 GMT	Kee 45+5' (pen.); Richards-Everton 53'	Report	Clark 9' (og.); Boldewijn 10', 41' (yellow card) 44'; Randall (yellow card) 27'; Yorwerth (yellow card) 39'; Meite (yellow card) 52'; Evina (yellow card) 89'; Clifford (yellow card) 89'	Stadium: Crown Ground; Attendance: 1,295; Referee: Scott Oldham

26 December 2017 23	Carlisle United	3–1	Accrington Stanley	Carlisle
15:00 GMT	Devitt 11'; S. Miller 78'; Grainger 83'	Report	Kee 47' (pen.) (yellow card) 65'	Stadium: Brunton Park; Attendance: 5,404; Referee: Steve Martin

30 December 2017 24	Grimsby Town	0–3	Accrington Stanley	Cleethorpes
15:00 GMT	Davies (yellow card) 22'; Matt (yellow card) 73'	Report	Jackson (yellow card) 31' (goal) 77'; Brown (yellow card) 37'; Kee 55' (pen.); McConville 61'	Stadium: Blundell Park; Attendance: 4,188; Referee: Darren Drysdale

==== January ====
1 January 2018 P	Accrington Stanley	v	Morecambe	Accrington
15:00 GMT		Report		Stadium: Crown Ground
Note: Due to heavy rains at halftime, with Stanley up 1–0, the game was abandoned by referee Graham Salisbury. See match report for further information.

6 January 2018 25	Accrington Stanley	4–0	Chesterfield	Accrington
15:00 GMT	Hughes 19'; McConville 32'; Ramsdale 49' (o.g.); Jackson (yellow card) 66'; Johnson (yellow card) 81'; Kee 89'; Richards-Everton (yellow card) 90+4'	Report	Maguire (yellow card) 9'; Hines (yellow card) 41'; German (yellow card) 90+4'	Stadium: Crown Ground; Attendance: 1,655; Referee: Chris Sarginson

13 January 2018 26	Cheltenham Town	0–2	Accrington Stanley	Cheltenham
15:00 GMT		Report	Kee 22'; Johnson (yellow card) 50'; McConville (yellow card) 61'; Jackson 62'; Brown (yellow card) 73'	Stadium: Whaddon Road; Attendance: 2,893; Referee: Kevin Johnson

20 January 2018 27	Accrington Stanley	3–2	Port Vale	Accrington
15:00 GMT	McConville 51', 72'; Kee 54'; Jackson (yellow card) 60'; Johnson (yellow card) 78'	Report	Pope 3'; Tonge 41'; Kay (yellow card) 66'; Worrall (yellow card) 77'	Stadium: Crown Ground; Attendance: 1,743; Referee: Ross Joyce

27 January 2018 28	Crawley Town	2–1	Accrington Stanley	Crawley
15:00 GMT	Boldewijn 15', 33' (yellow card) 90+5'; Young (yellow card) 73'	Report	Smith 57' (og.); Johnson (yellow card) 62'; Hughes (yellow card) 66'; McConville (yellow card) 85'	Stadium: Checkatrade.com Stadium; Attendance: 2,153; Referee: Gavin Ward

==== February ====
3 February 2018 29	Accrington Stanley	3–2	Stevenage	Accrington
15:00 GMT	McConville 45+3', 78' (yellow card) 61'; Kee 70'; Dunne (yellow card) 56'	Report	Godden 14'; Wilmot (yellow card) 18'; McKee 38'; King (yellow card) 45+2'; Vancooten (yellow card) 61'	Stadium: Crown Ground; Attendance: 1,324; Referee: John Brooks

6 February 2018 30	Accrington Stanley	2–1	Swindon Town	Accrington
19:45 GMT	Kee 25' (pen.) (yellow card) 90+4'; Clark (yellow card) 48'; Jackson 62'; McConville (yellow card) 75'	Report	Dunne (yellow card) 46'; Purkiss (yellow card) 49'; Lancashire (yellow card) 66'; Richards 71' (pen.); Gordon (red card) 75'; Banks (yellow card) 78'	Stadium: Crown Ground; Attendance: 1,243; Referee: Eddie Ilerton

10 February 2018 31	Coventry City	0–2	Accrington Stanley	Coventry
15:00 GMT	Devon Kelly-Evans (yellow card) 65'	Report	Clark 5', 60'; Kee (yellow card) 47'; Conneely (yellow card) 84'	Stadium: Ricoh Arena; Attendance: 28,343; Referee: Dean Whitestone

13 February 2018 32	Accrington Stanley	1–0	Crewe Alexandra	Accrington
19:45 GMT	Jackson 42'; Donacien (yellow card) 73'	Report		Stadium: Crown Ground; Attendance: 1,254; Referee: David Webb

17 February 2018 33	Barnet	1–1	Accrington Stanley	Canons Park
15:00 GMT	Nicholls 18'; Watson (yellow card) 53'; Sweeney (yellow card) 53'; Santos (yellow card) 68'; Akinola (yellow card) 85'	Report	Sousa (yellow card) 61'; Kee 68' (pen.)	Stadium: The Hive Stadium; Attendance: 1,501; Referee: Brett Huxtable

24 February 2018 34	Accrington Stanley	1–0	Cambridge United	Accrington
15:00 GMT	Hughes (yellow card) 39'; Jackson 57'; Johnson (yellow card) 90+3'	Report	Ikpeazu (yellow card) 38'; Deegan (yellow card) 38'; O'Neil (yellow card) 76'	Stadium: Crown Ground; Attendance: 1,819; Referee: Robert Lewis

==== March ====
3 March 2018 P	Newport County	v	Accrington Stanley	Newport
15:00 GMT		Report		Stadium: Rodney Parade
Note: The FA decided to cancel this match citing the reasons as: inclement weather across Great Britain, the safety of patrons at Rodney Parade and a frozen pitch.

6 March 2018 35	Accrington Stanley	1–0	Morecambe	Accrington
19:45 GMT	Kee 45+2' (pen.); Brown (yellow card) 63'; Jackson (yellow card) 67'	Report	Rose (yellow card) 73'; Old (yellow card) 85'	Stadium: Crown Ground; Attendance: 1,769; Referee: Eddie Ilderton

10 March 2018 36	Luton Town	1–2	Accrington Stanley	Luton
15:00 GMT	E. Lee 61' (yellow card) 76'; O.Lee (yellow card) 77'; Sheehan (yellow card) 83'; Gambin (yellow card) 90'	Report	McConville 44' (yellow card) 64'; Hughes (yellow card) 52'; Donacien (yellow card) 90+1'; Kee 90+3'; Jackson (yellow card) 90+5'	Stadium: Kenilworth Road; Attendance: 9,503; Referee: Darren Drysdale

17 March 2018 37	Accrington Stanley	3–1	Forest Green Rovers	Accrington
15:00 GMT	Johnson 3'; Clark 81'; Jackson 90+2'	Report	Reid 64'	Stadium: Crown Ground; Attendance: 2,313; Referee: David Webb

30 March 2018 38	Mansfield Town	0–1	Accrington Stanley	Mansfield
15:00 BST	Benning (red card) 13'; Mellis (yellow card) 58'; White (yellow card) 90+2'	Report	McConville (yellow card) 32'; Conneely 60'	Stadium: Field Mill; Attendance: 5.053; Referee: Andy Haines

==== April ====
2 April 2018 39	Accrington Stanley	1–0	Notts County	Accrington
15:00 BST	Hughes 9'	Report		Stadium: Crown Ground; Attendance: 3,039; Referee: John Busby

7 April 2018 40	Colchester United	0–1	Accrington Stanley	Colchester
15:00 BST	Eastman (yellow card) 65'	Report	Hughes (yellow card) 39'; Kee 63'; Dunne (yellow card) 66'; Clark (yellow card) 74'; Jackson (yellow card) 90+5'	Stadium: Weston Homes Community Stadium; Attendance: 3,174; Referee: Kevin Johnson

14 April 2018 41	Accrington Stanley	1–1	Exeter City	Accrington
15:00 BST	Jackson 38'; Conneely (yellow card) 80'	Report	Stockley 21'	Stadium: Crown Ground; Attendance: 3,135; Referee: Oliver Langford

17 April 2018 42	Accrington Stanley	2–0	Yeovil Town	Accrington
19:45 BST	Kee 26', 28'; McConville (yellow card) 33'	Report		Stadium: Crown Ground; Attendance: 3,176; Referee: Steve Martin

21 April 2018 43	Wycombe Wanderers	0–4	Accrington Stanley	High Wycombe
15:00 BST	Paris Cowan-Hall (yellow card) 62'	Report	Jackson 15'; Brown 33'; McConville 66'; Zanzala 95+5' (pen.)	Stadium: Adams Park; Referee: Darren Drysdale

24 April 2018 44	Newport County	2–1	Accrington Stanley	Newport
19:45 BST	Amond 30'; White (yellow card) 66'; Nouble 85'; Demetriou (yellow card) 88'	Report	Brown (yellow card) 61'; Kee 90'	Stadium: Rodney Parade; Attendance: 2,370; Referee: Lee Swabey

28 April 2018 45	Accrington Stanley	1–0	Lincoln City	Accrington
15:00 BST	Clark 35'; McConville (yellow card) 45+1'; Hughes (yellow card) 68'; Chapman (yellow card) 81'	Report	Green (yellow card) 20'; Wilson (yellow card) 33'	Stadium: Crown Ground; Attendance: 4,753 (Largest Crowd Ever at Wham Stadium); Referee: Michael Salisbury

==== May ====
5 May 2018 46	Swindon Town	3–0	Accrington Stanley	Swindon
15:00 BST	Richards 14'; Anderson 43'; Mullin 55'; Dunne (red card) 85'	Report	Dunne (yellow card) 76' (yellow-red card) 85'	Stadium: County Ground; Attendance: 6,116; Referee: Gavin Ward

=== FA Cup ===
Win Draw Loss

5 November 2017 First round	Guiseley	0–0	Accrington Stanley	Guiseley
14:00 GMT	Lenighan (yellow card) 19'; Brown (yellow card) 36'; M'Boungou (yellow card) 52'	Report	McConville (yellow card) 19'; Richards-Everton (yellow card) 58'	Stadium: Nethermoor Park; Attendance: 1,611; Referee: Antony Coggins

14 November 2017 First round replay	Accrington Stanley	1–1 (a.e.t.) (3–4 p)	Guiseley	Accrington
19:45 GMT	McConville 47'; Thorniley (yellow card) 79'	Report	Molyneux (yellow card) 18'; M'Boungou (yellow card) 40' (yellow-red card) 45+1'; Rooney (yellow card) 53' (goal) 79' (pen.); Brown (yellow card) 65'; Maxted (yellow card) 90+2'	Stadium: Crown Ground; Attendance: 1,166; Referee: Charles Breakspear
	Penalties
	Kee (penalty missed); Brown (penalty missed); McConville (penalty scored); Jackson (penalty scored); Wilks (penalty scored)		Rooney (penalty scored); McFadzean (penalty missed); Haworth (penalty scored); Brown (penalty scored); Fondop-Talom (penalty scored)

=== EFL Cup ===
Win Draw Loss

On 16 June 2017, Accrington Stanley were drawn at home to Preston North End in the first round. Stanley were home again for the second round, facing Premier League side West Bromwich Albion.

8 August 2017 First round	Accrington Stanley	3–2	Preston North End	Accrington
19:45 BST	Richards-Everton 20'; Clark 86'; Kee 90+3'	Report	Hugill 70', 90+1'	Stadium: Crown Ground; Attendance: 2,879; Referee: Eddie Ilderton

22 August 2017 Second round	Accrington Stanley	1–3	West Bromwich Albion	Accrington
19:45 BST	Dallison 88'	Report	Rondón 11'; McClean (yellow card) 30'; Phillips 31'; Rodriguez 64'	Stadium: Crown Ground; Attendance: 2,699; Referee: Jeremy Simpson

=== EFL Trophy ===
Win Draw Loss

On 28 July 2017, Stanley announced their group stage schedule.

Pos	Lge	Team	Pld	W	PW	PL	L	GF	GA	GD	Pts	Qualification
1	L1	Blackpool (Q)	3	2	0	1	0	7	3	+4	7	Round 2
2	L2	Accrington Stanley (Q)	3	2	0	0	1	8	4	+4	6	Round 2
3	L1	Wigan Athletic (E)	3	1	1	0	1	5	6	−1	5	
4	ACA	Middlesbrough U21 (E)	3	0	0	0	3	4	11	−7	0	

Updated to match(es) played on 7 November 2017. Source: EFL.com
(E) Eliminated; (Q) Qualified to the phase indicated

19 September 2017 Group Game 1	Accrington Stanley	3–2	Middlesbrough U21s	Accrington
19:30 BST	Brown 54'; Wilks 70'; Johnson (yellow card) 81'; Nolan 90+2'	Report	Armstrong (yellow card) 16' (goal) 65'; Reading (yellow card) 27' (goal) 32'	Stadium: Crown Ground; Attendance: 587; Referee: Graham Salisbury

3 October 2017 Group Game 2	Accrington Stanley	1–2	Blackpool	Accrington
19:30 BST	Sousa 38'	Report	Philliskirk 33'; Clayton 88'	Stadium: Crown Ground; Attendance: 975; Referee: Stuart Attwell

7 November 2017 Group Game 3	Wigan Athletic	0–4	Accrington Stanley	Wigan
19:45 GMT	Golden (yellow card) 24'; McGuffie (yellow card) 65'	Report	Edwards 12'; Sousa 30', 56'; Wilks (yellow card) 65'; Leacock-McLeod 89'	Stadium: DW Stadium; Attendance: 1,473; Referee: Peter Bankes

5 December 2017 Second round	Lincoln City	3–2	Accrington Stanley	Lincoln
19:45 GMT	Raggett (yellow card) 25' (goal) 61'; Palmer 37'; Green 45+1'; Woodyard (yellow card) 75'; Long (yellow card) 85'	Report	Wilks 7'; Thorniley (yellow card) 32'; Farman 42' (o.g.); McConville (yellow card) 54'; Hughes (yellow card) 62'	Stadium: Sincil Bank; Attendance: 3,026; Referee: Christopher Sarginson

== Player Stats ==
=== Appearances ===
Numbers in parentheses denote appearances as substitute.

As of match played 21:00, 5 May 2018 (UTC)

Sortable table
No.	Pos.	Nat.	Name	League 2	FA Cup	EFL Cup	EFL Trophy	Total
No.	Pos.	Nat.	Name	Apps	Apps	Apps	Apps	Apps
1	GK	(England)	Aaron Chapman	44 (1)	2	1	2	49 (1)
2	DF	(Republic of Ireland)	Jimmy Dunne	18 (2)	0	0	0	18 (2)
3	DF	(England)	Mark Hughes	46	2	2	1	51
4	DF	(Saint Lucia)	Janoi Donacien	45	2	1	1 (2)	49 (2)
5	DF	(England)	Ben Richards-Everton	19 (3)	2	2	3	26 (3)
6	MF	(Northern Ireland)	Liam Nolan	27 (2)	1	2	2 (1)	32 (3)
7	MF	(England)	Jordan Clark	43	1	2	1 (1)	47 (1)
8	MF	(England)	Scott Brown	28 (7)	1 (1)	2	4	35 (8)
9	FW	(Republic of the Congo)	Offrande Zanzala	0 (5)	0	0	0	0 (5)
10	FW	(England)	Kayden Jackson	44	2	2	0 (1)	48 (1)
11	MF	(England)	Sean McConville	43	2	2	1	48
12	MF	(England)	Danny Williams	0 (1)	0	0	0	0 (1)
13	GK	(England)	Nathan Wolland	0	0	0	0	0
14	MF	(England)	Mekhi Leacock-McLeod	0 (9)	0 (1)	0 (1)	3	3 (11)
15	DF	(England)	Ross Sykes	0 (2)	0	0	2 (1)	2 (3)
16	GK	(England)	Jonny Maxted	1	0	0	0	1
17	MF	(Portugal)	Érico Sousa	0 (6)	1	0	3	4 (6)
18	FW	(England)	Akeel Francis	0	0	0	0	0
19	DF	(England)	Charlie Rowan	0	0	0	0	0
20	DF	(Australia)	Reagan Ogle	0 (3)	0	0	2 (1)	2 (4)
21	DF	(England)	Zehn Mohammed	0	0	0	0	0
26	DF	(England)	Callum Johnson	29 (2)	1 (1)	0	2	32 (3)
28	MF	(Republic of Ireland)	Seamus Conneely	33	1	0 (2)	0	34 (2)
29	FW	(Northern Ireland)	Billy Kee	46	2	0 (2)	2	50 (2)
32	DF	(England)	Harvey Rodgers	4 (1)	0	0	0	4 (1)
33	GK	(England)	Toby Savin	0	0	0	0	0
41	MF	(England)	Josh Hmami	0 (1)	0	0	0	0 (1)
42	MF	(England)	Joel Mills	0	0	0	0	0
43	MF	(England)	Tom Reilly	0	0	0	0	0
44	MF	(England)	Niall Watson	0 (2)	0	0	0 (1)	0 (3)
Players who left the club in August/January transfer window or on loan
2	DF	(England)	Tyler Hornby-Forbes	2 (4)	0	1	3	6 (4)
9	FW	(England)	Jonathan Edwards	1 (1)	0	2	2 (1)	5 (2)
12	MF	(England)	Omar Beckles	2	0	0	0	2
12	DF	(England)	Jordan Thorniley	14	2	0	1	17
16	GK	(Denmark)	Simon Bloch Jørgensen	0	0	1	0	1
16	GK	(Poland)	Max Stryjek	1	0	0	2	3
18	DF	(England)	Tom Dallison	2	0	2	2	6
19	FW	(England)	Mallik Wilks	3 (15)	0 (1)	0	4	7 (16)
27	DF	(England)	Farrend Rawson	12	0	0	1 (1)	13 (1)

=== Goalscorers ===
Includes all competitive matches.

As of match played 21:00, 5 May 2018 (UTC)

Rank	Pos.	No.	Player	League 2	FA Cup	EFL Cup	EFL Trophy	Total
1	FW	29	(Northern Ireland) Billy Kee	25	0	1	0	26
2	FW	10	(England) Kayden Jackson	16	0	0	0	16
3	MF	11	(England) Sean McConville	12	1	0	0	13
4	MF	7	(England) Jordan Clark	8	0	1	0	9
5	FW	19	(England) Mallik Wilks	3	0	0	2	5
6	DF	3	(England) Mark Hughes	4	0	0	0	4
7	MF	17	(Portugal) Erico Sousa	0	0	0	3	3
8	DF	5	(England) Ben Richards-Everton	1	0	1	0	2
8	MF	8	(England) Scott Brown	1	0	0	1	2
8	DF	26	(England) Callum Johnson	2	0	0	0	2
8	MF	28	(Republic of Ireland) Seamus Conneely	2	0	0	0	2
12	MF	6	(Northern Ireland) Liam Nolan	0	0	0	1	1
12	MF	9	(Republic of the Congo) Offrande Zanzala	1	0	0	0	1
12	FW	9	(England) Jonathan Edwards	0	0	0	1	1
12	MF	14	(England) Mekhi Leacock-McLeod	0	0	0	1	1
12	DF	12	(England) Omar Beckles	1	0	0	0	1
12	DF	18	(England) Tom Dallison	0	0	1	0	1
#	Own Goals			2	0	0	1	3
Total				76	1	4	10	91

=== Disciplinary record ===
As of match played 21:00, 5 May 2018 (UTC)

No.	Pos.	Name	League Two		FA Cup		EFL Cup		EFL Trophy		Total	
No.	Pos.	Name	Booked	Sent off (straight red)	Booked	Sent off (straight red)	Booked	Sent off (straight red)	Booked	Sent off (straight red)	Booked	Sent off (straight red)
11	MF	Sean McConville	9	0	1	0	0	0	1	0	11	0
3	DF	Mark Hughes	7	0	0	0	0	0	1	0	8	0
10	FW	Kayden Jackson	8	0	0	0	0	0	0	0	8	0
4	DF	Janoi Donacien	7	0	0	0	0	0	0	0	7	0
26	DF	Callum Johnson	6	0	0	0	0	0	1	0	7	0
8	MF	Scott Brown	6	0	0	0	0	0	0	0	6	0
28	MF	Seamus Conneely	6	0	0	0	0	0	0	0	6	0
12	DF	Jordan Thorniley	3	0	1	0	0	0	1	0	5	0
29	FW	Billy Kee	4	0	0	0	0	0	0	0	4	0
2	DF	Jimmy Dunne	3	1	0	0	0	0	0	0	3	1
7	MF	Jordan Clark	3	0	0	0	0	0	0	0	3	0
19	FW	Mallik Wilks	2	0	0	0	0	0	1	0	3	0
5	DF	Ben Richards-Everton	1	0	1	0	0	0	0	0	2	0
27	DF	Farrend Rawson	1	1	0	0	0	0	0	0	1	1
1	GK	Aaron Chapman	1	0	0	0	0	0	0	0	1	0
2	DF	Tyler Hornby-Forbes	1	0	0	0	0	0	0	0	1	0
17	MF	Érico Sousa	1	0	0	0	0	0	0	0	1	0
18	DF	Tom Dallison	1	0	0	0	0	0	0	0	1	0
14	MF	Mekhi Leacock-McLeod	0	1	0	0	0	0	0	0	0	1
