= Liam Nolan (footballer) =

Northern Irish footballer (born 1994)

Personal information
- Full name: Liam Joseph Nolan
- Date of birth: 20 September 1994 (age 32)
- Place of birth: Liverpool, England
- Position: Midfielder

Team information
- Current team: Northcote City

Youth career
- –2011: Everton
- 2011–2013: Crewe Alexandra

Senior career*
Years	Team	Apps	(Gls)
2013–2015	Crewe Alexandra	26	(0)
2015–2017	Southport	81	(8)
2017–2019	Accrington Stanley	31	(0)
2018–2019	→ Salford City (loan)	7	(0)
2019–2020	FC Halifax Town	27	(2)
2020	Macclesfield Town	0	(0)
2020–2022	AFC Fylde	16	(1)
2022	→ AFC Telford United (loan)	14	(3)
2022–2023	AFC Telford United	37	(1)
2023–2024	Marine	23	(0)
2025–	Northcote City	53	(5)

International career
2014–2016	Northern Ireland U21	4	(0)
- * Club domestic league appearances and goals as of 12:43, 1 April 2025 (UTC)

Liam Joseph Nolan (born 20 September 1994) is a Northern Irish footballer who plays for Northcote City.

== Career ==
Nolan began his career with Crewe Alexandra having left Everton's Youth Academy at the age of 16. He made his professional debut on 21 September 2013 in a 1–1 draw against Oldham Athletic.

On 28 April 2014, Nolan signed a new two-year deal with the Railwaymen.

In May 2017 Nolan signed for Accrington Stanley. He scored his first goal for the club in an EFL Trophy tie against Middlesbrough Under-23s on 19 September 2017.

Having won the League Two Championship Accrington exercised a contractual option at the end of the 2017–18 season to retain him.

In November 2018 he joined Salford City on loan until January 2019. His club debut came a few days later in a match against Harrogate Town.

In July 2019 Nolan signed for National league side FC Halifax Town on a one-year deal.

In October 2020 he signed for National league north side AFC Fylde.

On 17 January 2022, after just 9 appearances in the 2021/22 season, Nolan joined National League North strugglers AFC Telford United on loan until the end of the season. This move was made permanent on 24 March 2022 after he had scored 3 goals in 14 appearances.

He signed for Marine in June 2023 after winning promotion to the National league north he left the club to move abroad in 2024.

In January 2025 he signed for Northcote City in Melbourne, Australia. He won promotion to the NPL with Northcote city in September 2026.

== Career statistics ==
As of match played 1 December 2018.

Club statistics
Club	Season	League			FA Cup		League Cup		Other		Total	
Club	Season	Division	Apps	Goals	Apps	Goals	Apps	Goals	Apps	Goals	Apps	Goals
Crewe Alexandra	2013–14	League One	13	0	0	0	0	0	0	0	13	0
Crewe Alexandra	2014–15	League One	13	0	0	0	2	0	1 (Note: Appearance in Football League Trophy)	0	16	0
Crewe Alexandra	Total		26	0	0	0	2	0	1	0	29	0
Southport	2015–16	National League	42	2	1	0	—		2 (Note: Appearance in FA Trophy)	0	45	2
Southport	2016–17	National League	39	6	3	0	—		2	0	44	6
Southport	Total		81	8	4	0	—		4	0	89	8
Accrington Stanley	2017–18	League Two	29	0	1	0	2	0	3	1	35	1
Accrington Stanley	2019–19	League One	1	0	0	0	1	0	1	0	3	0
Accrington Stanley	Total		30	0	1	0	3	0	4	1	38	1
Salford City (loan)	2018–19	National League	2	0	0	0	—		0	0	2	0
Salford City (loan)	Total		2	0	0	0	—		0	0	2	0
Career total			138	8	5	0	5	0	6	1	158	9

== Honours ==
Accrington Stanley

- EFL League Two: 2017–18
