= Callum Johnson (footballer) =

English footballer (born 1996)

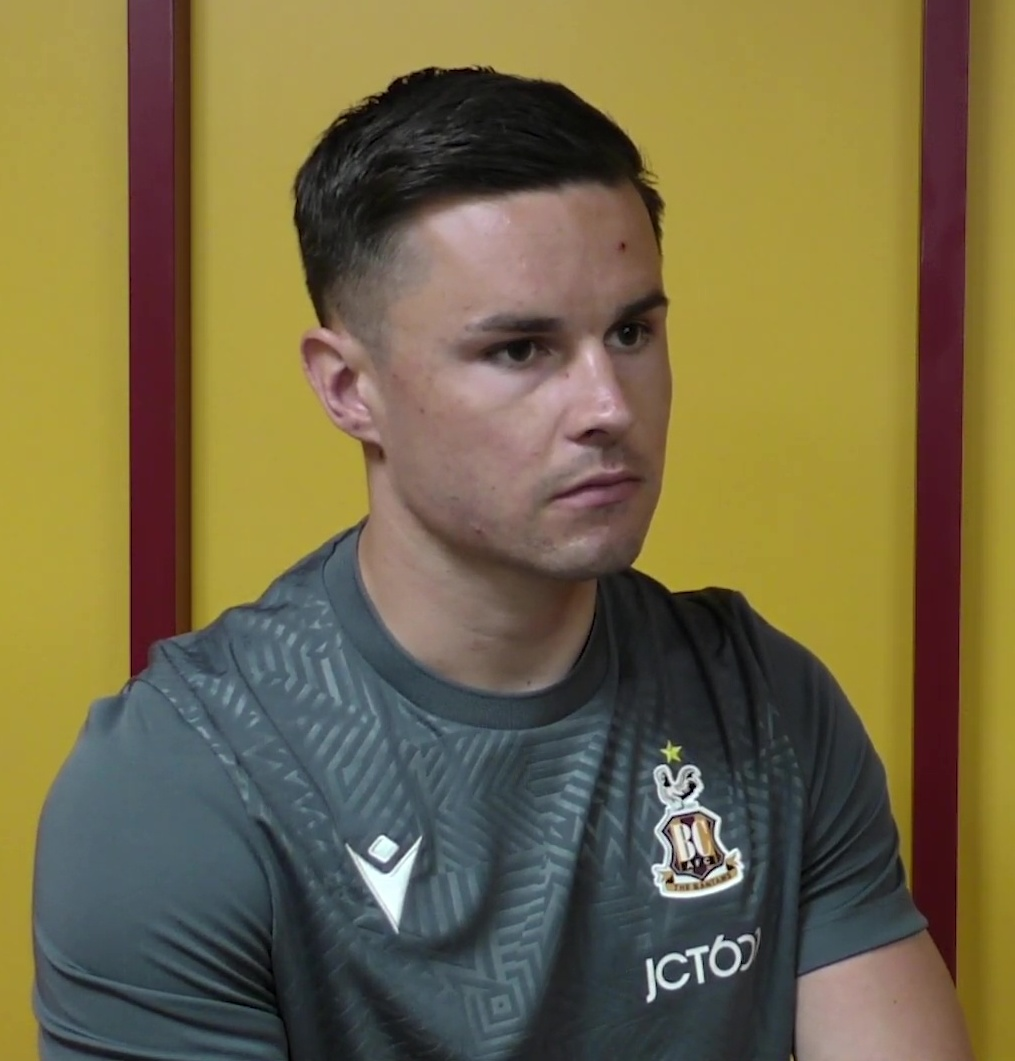
- Johnson with Bradford City in 2024

Personal information
- Full name: Callum Charles Johnson
- Date of birth: 23 October 1996 (age 30)
- Place of birth: Yarm, England
- Height: 1.88 m (6 ft 2 in)
- Position: Right-back

Youth career
- 2005–2015: Middlesbrough

Senior career*
Years	Team	Apps	(Gls)
2015–2018	Middlesbrough	0	(0)
2017–2018	→ Accrington Stanley (loan)	9	(0)
2018–2020	Accrington Stanley	96	(1)
2020–2022	Portsmouth	41	(0)
2021–2022	→ Fleetwood Town (loan)	35	(4)
2022–2023	Ross County	18	(0)
2023–2024	Mansfield Town	30	(1)
2024–2025	Bradford City	11	(0)
2025–2026	Gateshead	9	(0)
Total		249	(6)
- * Club domestic league appearances and goals

Callum Charles Johnson (born 23 October 1996) is an English former professional footballer who played as a right-back.

== Club career ==
=== Middlesbrough ===
Born in the Borough of Stockton-on-Tees, Johnson first represented Middlesbrough's Academy at the under-9 level. He originally played as a defensive-midfielder but soon converted to the role of right-back and by July 2017, was invited by first team manager Garry Monk to train with the senior side. He was also a part of the Middlesbrough squad which competed in the 2015–16 UEFA Youth League.

=== Accrington Stanley ===
On 31 August 2017, Johnson joined Accrington Stanley on a short-term loan, lasting until the end of January. He then made his debut for the club on 9 September 2017 in the EFL Trophy against Middlesbrough's U21 side, playing in a central-midfield role and receiving a yellow card in the 81st minute. He then went on the play the full 90 minutes in their next EFL Trophy tie, again playing in central-midfield, on 2 October 2017 against Blackpool at the Crown Ground.

On 5 January 2018, Johnson signed permanently with the club on a two-and-a-half-year contract for an undisclosed amount.

=== Portsmouth ===
In September 2020 Johnson signed for Portsmouth. He scored his first goal for the club in an FA Cup tie against Bristol City on 9 January 2021. Having spent the 2021–22 season on loan at Fleetwood Town, Johnson was released at the end of the season.

=== Ross County ===
Johnson signed a two-year contract with Ross County in July 2022.

=== Mansfield Town ===
On 13 January 2023, Johnson returned to English football, signing for EFL League Two club Mansfield Town for an undisclosed fee.

=== Bradford City ===
On 29 May 2024, Johnson signed a one-year contract with EFL League Two club Bradford City. He was released by Bradford City at the end of the 2024–25 season.

=== Gateshead ===
On 7 July 2025, Johnson joined National League side Gateshead on a one-year deal with an option to extend.

On 23 March 2026, Johnson retired following injuries.

== Style of play ==
Johnson is known to be a fairly versatile player, having played at right-back, centre-back, and defensive-midfield during his career.

== Career statistics ==
As of 23 March 2026

Appearances and goals by club, season and competition
Club	Season	League			FA Cup		League Cup		Other		Total	
Club	Season	Division	Apps	Goals	Apps	Goals	Apps	Goals	Apps	Goals	Apps	Goals
Middlesbrough	2017–18	Championship	0	0	0	0	0	0	—		0	0
Accrington Stanley (loan)	2017–18	League Two	9	0	2	0	0	0	2 (Note: Appearances in EFL Trophy)	0	13	0
Accrington Stanley	2017–18	League Two	22	1	0	0	0	0	—		22	1
Accrington Stanley	2018–19	League One	41	0	4	0	0	0	—		45	0
Accrington Stanley	2019–20	League One	33	0	1	0	1	0	3	0	38	0
Accrington Stanley	2020–21	League One	0	0	0	0	1	0	0	0	1	0
Accrington Stanley	Total		105	1	7	0	2	0	5	0	119	1
Portsmouth	2020–21	League One	40	0	3	1	0	0	3	0	46	1
Portsmouth	2021–22	League One	1	0	0	0	1	0	0	0	2	0
Portsmouth	Total		41	0	3	1	1	0	3	0	48	1
Fleetwood Town (loan)	2021–22	League One	35	4	1	0	0	0	3	0	39	4
Ross County	2022–23	Scottish Premiership	18	0	0	0	3	0	—		21	0
Mansfield Town	2022–23	League Two	13	0	0	0	0	0	0	0	13	0
Mansfield Town	2023–24	League Two	17	1	1	0	1	0	3	1	22	2
Mansfield Town	Total		30	1	1	0	1	0	3	1	35	2
Bradford City	2024–25	League Two	11	0	0	0	0	0	3	1	14	1
Gateshead	2025–26	National League	9	0	2	0	—		0	0	11	0
Career total			249	6	14	1	7	0	17	2	287	9

== Honours ==
Accrington Stanley

- EFL League Two: 2017–18

Mansfield Town

- EFL League Two third-place promotion: 2023–24
