= Seamus Conneely =

Irish association football player (born 1988)

Personal information
- Full name: Seamus Joseph Conneely
- Date of birth: 9 July 1988 (age 38)
- Place of birth: Lambeth, England
- Height: 1.85 m (6 ft 1 in)
- Position: Midfielder

Team information
- Current team: Accrington Stanley
- Number: 28

Youth career
- –2007: Mervue United
- 2007: Galway United

Senior career*
Years	Team	Apps	(Gls)
2008–2010	Galway United	85	(2)
2011–2012	Sheffield United	0	(0)
2012	→ Alfreton Town (loan)	9	(0)
2012–2014	Sligo Rovers	59	(3)
2015–	Accrington Stanley	345	(14)

International career^{‡}
2009–2010	Republic of Ireland U21	4	(0)
2010	Republic of Ireland U23	1	(0)
- * Club domestic league appearances and goals as of 16:58, 3 May 2026 (UTC) ‡ National team caps and goals as of 15:54, 1 January 2015 (UTC)

Seamus Joseph Conneely (born 9 July 1988) is an Irish professional footballer who plays as a central midfielder for EFL League Two club Accrington Stanley.

Born in London, Conneely moved with his parents to Connemara. He has previously played for Galway United, Sheffield United, Alfreton Town and Sligo Rovers.

== Playing career ==
=== Galway United ===
Conneely joined the club in 2007 from Mervue United. He completed a successful season in United's U21s before being given his senior competitive début against Shamrock Rovers at Terryland Park, replacing the injured Wesley Charles. This was Tony Cousins's last game in charge of Galway United.

=== Sheffield United ===
In January 2011 he signed an 18-month deal with English side Sheffield United. In over a year after signing for the Blades, Conneely did not make a first team appearance, but he was a regular for the reserve team where he was the team captain. On 9 March 2012 Conneely joined Alfreton Town on loan for a month. He made his Alfreton début the following day, coming on as a substitute after only 16 minutes away against Lincoln City at Sincil Bank in a 1–0 victory for Alfreton Town. After returning to Sheffield United, Conneely was released when his contract expired in May 2012.

=== Sligo Rovers ===
Conneely joined Sligo Rovers in July 2012, winning the League of Ireland Premier Division in his first season.

=== Accrington Stanley ===
In January 2015, Conneely signed for Accrington Stanley, reuniting with former Sligo Rovers manager John Coleman.

On 9 May 2025, the club announced the player would be leaving when his contract expired in June. Following a change of mind however, it was announced on 2 July 2025 that Conneely had signed a new one-year contract with the club.

On 29 June 2026, Conneely signed a new one-year contract.

== International career ==
Conneely was capped for Ireland at several youth levels from under-17s and made his under-21s début against Switzerland in October 2009. He also represented Ireland in an under-23 team as part of the 2009–11 International Challenge Trophy.

== Career statistics ==
As of match played on 2 September 2025

Club statistics
Club	Season	League			National Cup		League Cup		Europe		Other		Total	
Club	Season	Division	Apps	Goals	Apps	Goals	Apps	Goals	Apps	Goals	Apps	Goals	Apps	Goals
Galway United	2008	LOI Premier Division	20	0	5	0	1	0	—		—		26	0
Galway United	2009	LOI Premier Division	34	2	2	0	2	0	—		—		38	2
Galway United	2010	LOI Premier Division	31	0	3	1	1	0	—		1 (Note: Appearances in League of Ireland Premier Division Relegation Playoffs)	0	36	1
Galway United	Total		85	2	10	1	4	0	—		1	0	100	3
Sheffield United	2010–11	Championship	0	0	0	0	0	0	—		—		0	0
Sheffield United	2011–12	League One	0	0	0	0	0	0	—		0	0	0	0
Sheffield United	Total		0	0	0	0	0	0	—		0	0	0	0
Alfreton Town (loan)	2011–12	Conference Premier	9	0	0	0	—		—		0	0	9	0
Sligo Rovers	2012	LOI Premier Division	13	1	0	0	1	0	2 (Note: Appearances in UEFA Europa League)	0	0	0	16	1
Sligo Rovers	2013	LOI Premier Division	21	1	4	0	2	0	2 (Note: Appearances in UEFA Champions League)	0	1 (Note: Appearances in Setanta Sports Cup)	0	30	1
Sligo Rovers	2014	LOI Premier Division	25	1	0	0	1	0	4	0	5 (Note: Four appearances in Setanta Sports Cup, one appearance in President's Cup)	0	35	1
Sligo Rovers	Total		59	3	4	0	4	0	8	0	6	0	81	3
Accrington Stanley	2014–15	League Two	16	3	0	0	0	0	—		0	0	16	3
Accrington Stanley	2015–16	League Two	46	3	1	0	1	0	—		3 (Note: One appearance in Football League Trophy, two appearances in League Two play-offs)	0	51	3
Accrington Stanley	2016–17	League Two	38	1	4	0	3	0	—		1 (Note: Appearances in EFL Trophy)	0	46	1
Accrington Stanley	2017–18	League Two	33	2	1	0	2	0	—		0	0	36	2
Accrington Stanley	2018–19	League One	27	1	2	0	1	0	—		4	0	34	1
Accrington Stanley	2019–20	League One	31	1	1	0	0	0	—		4	0	36	1
Accrington Stanley	2020–21	League One	38	1	1	0	0	0	—		2	0	41	1
Accrington Stanley	2021–22	League One	22	0	1	0	0	0	—		1	0	24	0
Accrington Stanley	2022–23	League One	26	0	3	0	0	0	—		5	0	34	0
Accrington Stanley	2023–24	League Two	27	0	2	1	0	0	—		1	0	30	1
Accrington Stanley	2024–25	League Two	26	1	3	0	0	0	—		1	0	30	1
Accrington Stanley	2025–26	League Two	35	1	1	0	2	0	—		2	0	40	1
Accrington Stanley	Total		365	14	20	1	9	0	—		24	0	418	15
Career total			518	19	34	2	17	0	8	0	31	0	608	21

== Honours ==
Sligo Rovers

- League of Ireland Premier Division: 2012
- FAI Cup: 2013
- Setanta Sports Cup: 2014

Accrington Stanley

- EFL League Two: 2017–18

Individual

- Accrington Stanley Player of the Season: 2020–21
