= Niall Watson =

English footballer

Personal information
- Full name: Niall Robert Watson
- Date of birth: 6 April 2000 (age 26)
- Place of birth: Maghull, England
- Positions: Midfielder; winger; striker

Team information
- Current team: Hednesford Town

Youth career
- –2017: Accrington Stanley

Senior career*
Years	Team	Apps	(Gls)
2017–2020	Accrington Stanley	2	(0)
2018	→ Marine (loan)		
2018	→ Runcorn Linnets (loan)		
2019	→ Widnes (loan)		
2019	→ Sligo Rovers (loan)		
2020	→ Airbus UK (loan)		
2020–2024	Southport		
2024	South Georgia Tormenta		
2024–	Hednesford Town		
2025	→ Warrington Town (loan)		
- * Club domestic league appearances and goals as of 14:42, 10 October 2025 (UTC)

Niall Robert Watson (born 6 April 2000) is an English professional footballer who plays as a midfielder for National League North club Hednesford Town.

== Club career ==
=== Accrington Stanley and loan moves ===
On 19 September 2017, Watson made his professional debut for Accrington Stanley in their EFL Trophy tie against Middlesbrough U23s, replacing Mekhi Leacock-McLeod in the 3–2 victory.

On 22 January 2018, Watson joined Northern Premier League Premier Division side Marine on loan.

In August 2018 he joined Runcorn Linnets on loan.

On 11 January 2019, Watson joined Widnes on loan until the end of the season.

In July 2019 he joined Sligo Rovers on a season long loan.

In February 2020 he joined Airbus UK until the end of the season.

=== Southport ===
In October 2020 it was announced that Watson would link up with his father, Liam Watson, at National League North side Southport after a successful trial. He made his first league appearance for the club on 6 October, coming on as a late substitute in the 0–0 draw against Hereford.

=== South Georgia Tormenta ===
On 30 December 2023, it was announced that Watson would join third-tier American side South Georgia Tormenta for their 2024 season.

=== Hednesford Town ===
On 10 January 2025, Watson returned to England, joining Northern Premier League Division One West club Hednesford Town.

In October 2025, Watson joined fellow Northern Premier League Premier Division side Warrington Town on loan for the remainder of the season. He was recalled by his parent club in December.

== Career statistics ==
As of match played 6 October 2020.

Appearances and goals by club, season and competition
Club	Season	League			National Cup		League Cup		Other		Total	
Club	Season	Division	Apps	Goals	Apps	Goals	Apps	Goals	Apps	Goals	Apps	Goals
Accrington Stanley	2017–18	League Two	2	0	0	0	0	0	1 (Note: Appearance(s) in EFL Trophy)	0	3	0
Marine (loan)	2017–18	Northern Premier League Premier Division	7	0	0	0	—		1 (Note: Appearance(s) in Northern Premier League Challenge Cup)	0	8	0
Runcorn Linnets (loan)	2018–19	NWCFL Premier Division	?	?	?	?	—		?	?	?	?
Widnes (loan)	2018–19	NWCFL Premier Division	?	?	?	?	—		?	?	?	?
Sligo Rovers (loan)	2019	League of Ireland Premier Division	5	1	2	1	—		—		7	2
Airbus UK Broughton (loan)	2019-20	Cymru Premier	3	3	—		—		1	0	4	3
Southport	2020–21	National League North	1	0	1	1	0		0	0	2	1
Career total			18+	4+	3+	2+	0	0	6+	1+	24+	6+

== Personal life ==
Niall is the son of former footballer and manager Liam Watson.
