= Billy Kee =

Northern Irish footballer (born 1990)

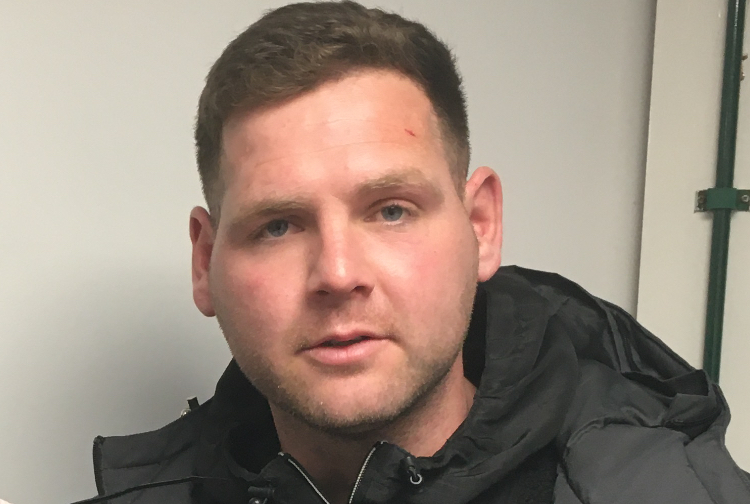
- Kee in 2020

Personal information
- Full name: Billy Rodney Kee
- Date of birth: 1 December 1990 (age 35)
- Place of birth: Loughborough, England
- Height: 5 ft 9 in (1.75 m)
- Position: Forward

Team information
- Current team: Quorn

Youth career
- Allexton & New Parks
- 2007–2009: Leicester City

Senior career*
Years	Team	Apps	(Gls)
2009–2010	Leicester City	0	(0)
2009–2010	→ Accrington Stanley (loan)	37	(9)
2010–2011	Torquay United	44	(9)
2011–2014	Burton Albion	99	(39)
2014–2015	Scunthorpe United	12	(0)
2014–2015	→ Mansfield Town (loan)	13	(2)
2015–2020	Accrington Stanley	174	(68)
2020–2023	Coalville Town	79	(27)
2023–	Quorn	45	(13)

International career
2008–2009	Northern Ireland U19	8	(4)
2009–2011	Northern Ireland U21	10	(3)
- * Club domestic league appearances and goals as of 11:52, 22 March 2026 (UTC)

Billy Rodney Kee (born 1 December 1990) is a footballer who plays as a forward for Northern Premier League Premier Division side Quorn. Born in England, he represented Northern Ireland at under-19 and under-21 youth levels.

== Early life ==
Kee was born in Loughborough, Leicestershire and was raised in Mountsorrel. He went to school in Quorn.

== Club career ==
=== Leicester City ===
Kee joined Leicester City in 2004 after the club spotted him, playing for Allexton & New Parks. He started the 2008 Academy League by scoring 14 goals in five games for the club. Kee's biggest game in a Leicester shirt was against Crystal Palace Under 19s in the FA Youth Cup where he was on the score sheet and was Man of the Match, beating Swedish Under-19s goalkeeper Robin Mattsson with a strike.

On 17 July 2009, it was announced that Kee had agreed his first professional contract at Leicester after considering leaving the club. On the same day, a six-month loan deal at Accrington Stanley was also announced. Kee made his League debut for Accrington, playing 84 minutes before being replaced by Michael Symes as Stanley lost 1–0 to Rotherham United. On 11 September 2010, Kee scored his first Accrington Stanley goal, scoring a winning goal in the 84th minute, a 2–1 win over Darlington. His three goals and nineteen appearances led Accrington Stanley extending Kee's loan spell with the club until the end of the season. Kee went on to make eighteen more appearances and scoring six more goals for the club, including a brace, in a 2–0 win over Chesterfield on 1 May 2010.

On 17 May 2010, Kee was released by Leicester along with Stephen Clemence, Levi Porter, Robbie Burns, Carl Pentney, Astrit Ajdarević and Alex Cisak. Following this, Kee expressed his disappointment to be released by the club.

=== Torquay United ===
On 3 June 2010, it was announced Kee had signed a two-year contract with League Two club Torquay United. Kee was linked with a move to Accrington Stanley and Exeter City.

Kee started the season by scoring eight goals in six pre-season fixtures including four against Tiverton Town in an 8–0 win and a hat-trick against Weymouth in a 5–1 win. At the start of the season Kee was given the no. 8 shirt formerly worn by the departing Tim Sills.

Kee made his debut in the first game of the 2010–11 season in a 3–0 win over Northampton, coming on as a 63rd-minute substitute replacing another new signing of that summer, Martin Gritton. Despite being in great goal-scoring form in pre-season, Kee did not get his first competitive Gulls' goal until 2 November 2010, scoring the second goal in a 2–0 victory against newly promoted Oxford United. He then scored his only goal outside the last twenty minutes of any game with a forty-first-minute goal from the penalty spot in the second round of the FA Cup against League One Walsall.

Kee had to wait another five weeks before his next goal. He scored against Oxford United for the second time in the season. He scored just 12 days later in 2–1 defeat to Morecambe. After this, the goals began to flow due to the departure of United's main Striker Elliot Benyon. His comments came after the club's manager Paul Buckle believed Kee could be a replacement for Benyon as a key player. Kee scored in a win over Stockport on 5 February 2011, followed up with another win against Barnet on 12 February 2011. Seven days later on 19 February 2011, Kee scored, in a 1–1 draw against Southend United. Kee then scored two more goals of the season against Northampton Town and Bradford City between 25 March and 9 April 2011. On 25 April 2011, Kee scored in a 3–3 draw with Burton Albion, side-footing the ball in from 20 yards out. Kee went on to make forty appearances and scoring nine goals, having missed six games due to ankle injury.

At the beginning of the 2011–12 season, Kee found himself out of favour at Torquay, new manager Martin Ling preferring to use new signings Taiwo Atieno and Rene Howe as his first-choice pairing, often leaving Kee on the bench. Kee expressed leaving the club was over closer to be his home at Leicester Ironically, Ling was impressed with Kee's display when he scored a hat-trick for Northern Ireland U21, in a 4–0 win over Faroe Islands U21.

=== Burton Albion ===
Kee joined Burton Albion on 26 August 2011, for a fee believed to be £20,000.

Throughout the first half of the season, Kee scored his first goal in a 2–0 victory over Swindon Town on 17 September 2011, which followed up by scoring the next two goals against Gillingham and Bradford City. On 29 October 2011, Kee scored his first hat-trick against Barnet in a 6–3 victory for Burton. Due to his goalscoring form for Burton Albion, Kee was named League Two Player of the Month for November. Despite rejecting a move to Crawley Town in the winter transfer window, Kee continued to score goals with twelve until he suffered a groin problems three times season, which the last one saw him miss out the entire season. Kee, nevertheless, became club's joint top-scorer in the league, before his record was broken by Lucas Akins in 2019.

After scoring once in the first third match to the start of the season, which saw him make a return, Kee signed a three-year contract with the club on 30 August 2012. Kee would later score two braces of the season against Rotherham United and another against Morecambe. Kee would score thirteen league goals in forty appearances, missing out six games due to ankle injury.

In the 2013–14 season, Kee made a good start to the season when he scored his first goal of the season, in a 2–2 draw against Cheltenham Town before suffering a thigh injury that kept him out for weeks. Kee made his return to training to maintain his fitness and then scored the first two games from his return against Scunthorpe United and a brace against Wycombe Wanderers. Kee would later add ten more goals to the season, including a brace against Accrington Stanley, in thirty-seven league appearances.

In the 2014–15 season, Kee played for the first two matches, including a brace, in a 2–1 win over Dagenham & Redbridge on 16 August 2014. Those brace came when he came on as a substitute during the match.

=== Scunthorpe United ===
After three years at Burton Albion, Kee joined Scunthorpe United on 18 August 2014. He joined his new side on a two-year contract for an undisclosed fee, having one-year left on his contract at The Brewers. Upon joining the club, Kee stated he was motivated for new challenges at the club. Kee made his Scunthorpe United debut on 19 August, coming on as a substitute for Paddy Madden in the 75th minute, in a 2–0 loss against Fleetwood Town.

On 5 January 2015, it announced that Kee had been loaned out to Mansfield Town on a three-month deal. Kee made his Mansfield Town debut against his former club, Burton Albion, in a 2–1 loss on 10 January 2015. Kee scored his first Mansfield Town goal in the next game, in a 3–2 loss against Exeter City. Kee's second goal for Mansfield Town soon came on 7 March 2015, in a 1–1 draw against Cheltenham Town. On 7 April 2015, Kee returned to the club after a three-month spell there.

On 1 May 2015, Scunthorpe announced the departure of Kee, having terminated his contract by mutual consent. He failed to score a single goal in his twelve competitive appearances for the Iron.

=== Accrington Stanley ===
After being released by Scunthorpe United, Kee re-joined Accrington Stanley on an initial one-year contract, having previously played on-loan at the club in the 2009–10 season.

In April 2018 he was named EFL League Two Player of the Season, finishing the 2017–18 campaign as the division's top goalscorer with 25 goals (plus eight assists).

In July 2019, he missed Accrington's pre-season for personal reasons. In September, it was revealed that Kee was seeking treatment for depression, anxiety, and bulimia. As a result of this, the club and Kee agreed to terminate his contract by mutual consent on 13 January 2020, with Kee subsequently announcing his retirement from professional football on 29 January for personal reasons. In honour of the forward, the club retired Kee's shirt number 29.

=== Coalville Town ===
After retiring from professional football Kee signed for Southern League Premier Division Central side Coalville Town on 9 February 2020. He made his league debut for Coalville Town in a 1–0 loss against Needham Market on 11 February 2020.

On 27 July 2022, Coalville Town announced in a statement that Kee would be taking a break from football at his own request in order to spend more time with his family.

=== Quorn ===
In October 2023, Kee joined Northern Premier League Division One Midlands club Quorn.

== International career ==
Kee was called up by Northern Ireland U19 in 2008 and scored three goals in three appearances in the final of Milk Cup, including a 2–0 win over against Denmark U19.

On 6 September 2009, Kee, whilst on loan to League Two side Accrington Stanley, was called up to the senior Northern Ireland squad for the first time, replacing the injured Kyle Lafferty.

Following this, Kee was called up by Northern Ireland U21 in November 2009.

== Personal life ==
In May 2014, Kee became a father when his wife gave birth to a baby boy. Kee has spoken publicly about his struggles with anxiety and depression, which led him to considering giving up football. In September 2019, it was revealed that Kee was seeking treatment for depression, anxiety and bulimia.

Kee combines his non-league football with work as a bricklayer.

== Career statistics ==
As of match played 21 March 2026

Appearances and goals by club, season and competition
Club	Season	League			FA Cup		League Cup		Other		Total	
Club	Season	Division	Apps	Goals	Apps	Goals	Apps	Goals	Apps	Goals	Apps	Goals
Leicester City	2009–10	Championship	—		—		—		0	0	0	0
Accrington Stanley (loan)	2009–10	League Two	37	9	3	0	2	0	2 (Note: Appearances in Football League Trophy)	0	44	9
Torquay United	2010–11	League Two	40	9	4	1	1	0	5 (Note: Two appearances in Football League Trophy, three in League Two play-offs)	0	50	10
Torquay United	2011–12	League Two	4	0	—		0	0	—		4	0
Torquay United	Total		44	9	4	1	1	0	5	0	54	10
Burton Albion	2011–12	League Two	20	12	0	0	—		0	0	20	12
Burton Albion	2012–13	League Two	40	13	3	0	3	1	3 (Note: One appearance in Football League Trophy, two in League Two play-offs)	0	49	14
Burton Albion	2013–14	League Two	37	12	4	2	1	0	3 (Note: Appearances in League Two play-offs)	0	45	14
Burton Albion	2014–15	League Two	2	2	—		1	0	—		3	2
Burton Albion	Total		99	39	7	2	5	1	6	0	117	42
Scunthorpe United	2014–15	League One	12	0	2	0	—		2	0	16	0
Mansfield Town (loan)	2014–15	League Two	13	2	—		—		—		13	2
Accrington Stanley	2015–16	League Two	45	17	2	0	1	0	3	0	51	17
Accrington Stanley	2016–17	League Two	39	13	3	2	2	0	2 (Note: Appearances in EFL Trophy)	0	46	15
Accrington Stanley	2017–18	League Two	46	25	2	0	2	1	2	0	52	26
Accrington Stanley	2018–19	League One	44	13	4	2	0	0	1	1	49	16
Accrington Stanley	2019–20	League One	0	0	0	0	0	0	0	0	0	0
Accrington Stanley	Total		174	68	11	4	5	1	8	1	198	74
Coalville Town	2019–20	Southern League Premier Division Central	3	1	0	0	—		0	0	3	1
Coalville Town	2020–21	Southern League Premier Division Central	7	4	3	1	—		1 (Note: Appearances in FA Trophy)	0	11	5
Coalville Town	2021–22	Southern League Premier Division Central	38	17	2	0	—		3 (Note: One appearance in FA Trophy, two appearances in Southern League Premier Division Central play-offs)	0	43	17
Coalville Town	2022–23	Southern League Premier Division Central	31	5	6	0	—		4	1	41	6
Coalville Town	Total		79	27	11	1	—		8	1	98	29
Quorn	2023–24	Northern Premier League Division One Midlands	10	0	0	0	—		2 (Note: One appearance in FA Trophy, one appearance in Northern Premier League Division One Midlands play-offs)	0	12	0
Quorn	2024–25	Northern Premier League Division One Midlands	14	6	0	0	—		1 (Note: One appearance in Leicestershire Challenge Cup semi-final)	0	15	6
Quorn	2025–26	Southern League Premier Division Central	21	3	2	0	—		1 (Note: One appearance and one goal in the FA Trophy)	1	24	4
Career total			503	163	40	8	13	2	35	3	591	176

== Honours ==
Accrington Stanley

- EFL League Two: 2017–18

Individual

- Football League Young Player of the Month: October 2011
- Accrington Stanley Player of the Season: 2015–16, 2017–18
- EFL League Two Player of the Season: 2017–18
- EFL League Two Golden Boot: 2017–18
- EFL Team of the Season: 2017–18
- PFA Team of the Year: 2017–18 League Two
