= Simon Bloch Jørgensen =

German-born Danish footballer (born 1992)

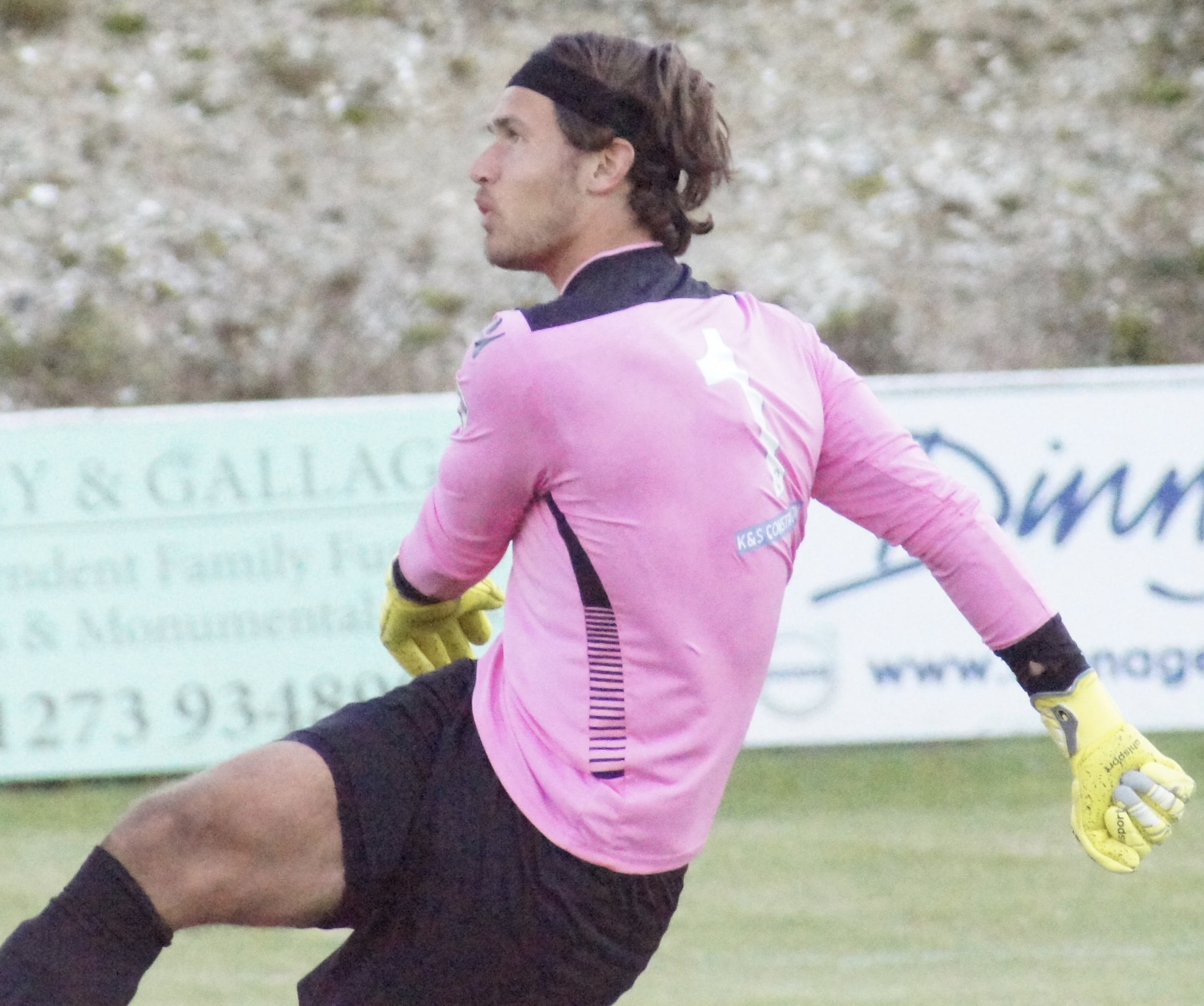
- Jørgensen in 2017

Personal information
- Full name: Simon Kristian Bloch Jørgensen
- Date of birth: 1 September 1992 (age 34)
- Place of birth: Flensburg, Germany
- Height: 2.10 m (6 ft 10 1/2 in)
- Position: Goalkeeper

Youth career
- 1999–2007: Frem
- 2008–2009: Copenhagen
- 2009: B.93

Senior career*
Years	Team	Apps	(Gls)
2010–2013	B.93	8	(0)
2013–2014	B.1908	15	(0)
2014–2016	Frem	53	(0)
2016–2017	Waltham Forest	1	(0)
2017	Brønshøj		
2017	Accrington Stanley	0	(0)
2017	Whitehawk	4	(0)
2018	Greve IF		
2019	Dulwich Hamlet	2	(0)
2020–2022	Waltham Abbey	21	(0)
- * Club domestic league appearances and goals as of 11:43, 7 August 2022 (UTC)

Simon Kristian Bloch Jørgensen (born 1 September 1992) is a Danish former professional footballer who played as a goalkeeper.

== Career ==
Born in Flensburg, Germany, Bloch spent his early career with Frem, Copenhagen, B.93 and B.1908. He left Frem in November 2016 by mutual consent, after making 53 appearances for them. He played one game Waltham Forest in the Essex Senior League during the 2016–17 season. He signed for Brønshøj in March 2017, before moving to English club Accrington Stanley in August 2017. He made one appearance for the club, in the EFL Cup on 8 August 2017 before joining National League South side Whitehawk, where he made four league appearances. After a year at Danish 2nd Division club Greve IF, on 7 February 2019, he signed for National League South side Dulwich Hamlet. In August 2020, he signed for Waltham Abbey.

== Personal life ==
His grandfather Bloch Kristian Petersen and his great-uncle Kaj Hansen were both footballers. With a height of 2.10 metres, he is considered one of the tallest professional footballers in history.
