= Mekhi Leacock-McLeod =

English footballer

Personal information
- Date of birth: 15 September 1996 (age 30)
- Place of birth: London, England
- Position: Midfielder

Team information
- Current team: Haringey Borough

Youth career
- 2004–2014: Fulham
- 2014–2016: Wolverhampton Wanderers
- 2016: Rangers

Senior career*
Years	Team	Apps	(Gls)
2016	Ware	3	(0)
2016–2017	VCD Athletic	9	(3)
2017	Eastleigh	5	(0)
2017	Billericay Town	9	(2)
2017–2018	Accrington Stanley	10	(0)
2018	→ Southport (loan)	2	(0)
2018	→ Warrington Town (loan)		
2018–2019	FC Halifax Town	4	(0)
2019	Welling United	2	(0)
2019	VCD Athletic	1	(0)
2019	Coggeshall Town	8	(2)
2019–2020	Romford	10	(2)
2020–2022	Haringey Borough	27	(2)
2022	Farnborough	1	(0)
2022–2025	Haringey Borough		
2025	May & Baker	3	(1)
2025	Kings Park Rangers	1	(0)
- * Club domestic league appearances and goals as of 20:16, 9 July 2026 (UTC)

Mekhi Leacock-McLeod (born 15 September 1996) is an English professional footballer. He played in the Football League for Accrington Stanley.

== Career ==
In June 2017, McLeod signed for Accrington Stanley on a one-year deal. Two months later he made his league debut for Accrington Stanley coming off the bench for Tom Dallison in a 3–2 loss against Yeovil Town. He was released by Accrington at the end of the 2017–18 season.

On 22 July 2018, he signed for National League club FC Halifax Town. After only eight appearances, he was released in January 2019, and later that season played for Welling United, VCD Athletic and Coggeshall Town. McLeod joined Romford in November 2019. He later joined Haringey Borough in December 2020.

During the 2025–26 season, McLeod played for both May & Baker and Kings Park Rangers.

== Career statistics ==
As of match played 28 March 2023

Appearances and goals by club, season and competition
Club	Season	League			FA Cup		EFL Cup		Other		Total	
Club	Season	Division	Apps	Goals	Apps	Goals	Apps	Goals	Apps	Goals	Apps	Goals
Ware	2016–17	Isthmian League Division One North	3	0	—		—		1 (Note: Appearance in the FA Trophy)	0	4	0
VCD Athletic	2016–17	Isthmian League Division One North	9	3	—		—		—		9	3
Eastleigh	2016–17	National League	5	0	—		—		—		5	0
Billericay Town	2016–17	Isthmian League Premier Division	9	2	—		—		—		9	2
Accrington Stanley	2017–18	League Two	10	0	1	0	1	0	3 (Note: Appearances in the EFL Trophy)	1	15	1
Southport (loan)	2017–18	National League North	2	0	—		—		—		2	0
Warrington Town (loan)	2017–18	Northern Premier League Premier Division	No data currently available									
FC Halifax Town	2018–19	National League	6	0	1	0	—		1	0	8	0
Welling United	2018–19	National League South	2	0	—		—		—		2	0
VCD Athletic	2018–19	Isthmian League South East Division	1	0	—		—		—		1	0
Coggeshall Town	2018–19	Isthmian League North Division	5	1	—		—		1 (Note: Appearance in the Isthmian League North Division play-offs)	0	6	1
Coggeshall Town	2019–20	Isthmian League North Division	3	1	2	0	—		1 (Note: Appearance in the Alan Turvey Trophy)	0	6	1
Coggeshall Town	Total		8	2	2	0	—		2	0	12	2
Romford	2019–20	Isthmian League North Division	10	2	—		—		—		10	2
Haringey Borough	2020–21	Isthmian League Premier Division	0	0	—		—		1	0	1	0
Haringey Borough	2021–22	Isthmian League Premier Division	27	2	1	0	—		1	0	29	2
Haringey Borough	Total		27	2	1	0	—		2	0	30	2
Farnborough	2022–23	National League South	1	0	2	0	—		0	0	3	0
Haringey Borough	2022–23	Isthmian League Premier Division	7	0	—		—		2	0	9	0
Career total			100	11	7	0	1	0	11	1	119	12
