= 2017–18 EFL League Two =

EFL League Two
- Season: 2017–18
- Champions: Accrington Stanley
- Promoted: Accrington Stanley; Luton Town; Wycombe Wanderers; Coventry City
- Relegated: Chesterfield; Barnet
- Matches: 552
- Goals: 1,458 (2.64 per match)
- Top goalscorer: Billy Kee (25 goals)
- Biggest home win: Luton 7–0 Cambridge
- Biggest away win: Cheltenham 1–6 Coventry; Crewe 0–5 Carlisle; Swindon 0–5 Luton
- Highest scoring: Luton 8–2 Yeovil
- Longest winning run: 7 matches (Accrington Stanley
- Longest unbeaten run: 15 matches (Accrington Stanley
- Longest winless run: 20 matches (Grimsby Town)
- Longest losing run: 6 matches (Chesterfield, Port Vale)
- All statistics correct as of 9 December 2017.

The 2017–18 EFL League Two (referred to as the Sky Bet League Two for sponsorship reasons) is the 14th season of the Football League Two under its current title and the 25th season under its current league division format.

== Team changes ==
The following teams changed division after the 2016–17 season.

=== To League Two ===
Promoted from National League

- Lincoln City
- Forest Green Rovers

Relegated from League One

- Port Vale
- Swindon Town
- Coventry City
- Chesterfield

=== From League Two ===
Promoted to League One

- Portsmouth
- Plymouth Argyle
- Doncaster Rovers
- Blackpool

Relegated to National League

- Hartlepool United
- Leyton Orient

== Teams ==
Locations of the 2017–18 Football League Two teams

Team	Location	Stadium	Capacity
Accrington Stanley	Accrington	Crown Ground	5,057
Barnet	London (Edgware)	The Hive Stadium	6,418
Cambridge United	Cambridge	Abbey Stadium	8,127
Carlisle United	Carlisle	Brunton Park	17,949
Cheltenham Town	Cheltenham	Whaddon Road	7,066
Chesterfield	Chesterfield	Proact Stadium	10,400
Colchester United	Colchester	Colchester Community Stadium	10,105
Coventry City	Coventry	Ricoh Arena	32,609
Crawley Town	Crawley	Broadfield Stadium	5,996
Crewe Alexandra	Crewe	Gresty Road	10,180
Exeter City	Exeter	St James Park	8,830
Forest Green Rovers	Nailsworth	The New Lawn	5,147
Grimsby Town	Cleethorpes	Blundell Park	9,052
Lincoln City	Lincoln	Sincil Bank	10,120
Luton Town	Luton	Kenilworth Road	10,356
Mansfield Town	Mansfield	Field Mill	10,000
Morecambe	Morecambe	Globe Arena	6,476
Newport County	Newport	Rodney Parade	7,850
Notts County	Nottingham	Meadow Lane	19,588
Port Vale	Burslem	Vale Park	19,052
Stevenage	Stevenage	Broadhall Way	6,722
Swindon Town	Swindon	County Ground	15,728
Wycombe Wanderers	High Wycombe	Adams Park	9,617
Yeovil Town	Yeovil	Huish Park	9,566

== Managerial changes ==
Team	Outgoing manager	Manner of departure	Date of vacancy	Position in table	Incoming manager	Date of appointment
Swindon Town	Luke Williams	Mutual consent	5 May 2017	Pre-season	David Flitcroft	5 June 2017
Port Vale	Michael Brown	Sacked	16 September 2017	24th	(England) Neil Aspin	4 October 2017
Chesterfield	(Scotland) Gary Caldwell	Sacked	16 September 2017	23rd	(England) Jack Lester	29 September 2017
Barnet	(England) Rossi Eames	Appointed as Head of Development	13 November 2017	23rd	(Scotland) Mark McGhee	14 November 2017
Barnet	(Scotland) Mark McGhee	Appointed as Head of Technical	15 January 2018	24th	(England) Graham Westley	15 January 2018
Cambridge United	(England) Shaun Derry	Mutual consent	9 February 2018	14th	(Republic of Ireland) Joe Dunne	2 May 2018
Grimsby Town	Russell Slade	Sacked	11 February 2018	17th	Michael Jolley	2 March 2018
Mansfield Town	(Scotland) Steve Evans	Signed by Peterborough United	27 February 2018	5th	David Flitcroft	1 March 2018
Swindon Town	David Flitcroft	Signed by Mansfield Town	1 March 2018	7th	Phil Brown	12 March 2018
Stevenage	(England) Darren Sarll	Sacked	18 March 2018	16th	(Tunisia) Dino Maamria	20 March 2018
Barnet	(England) Graham Westley	Sacked	19 March 2018	24th	(England) Martin Allen	19 March 2018
Chesterfield	(England) Jack Lester	Mutual consent	24 April 2018	24th	(England) Martin Allen	15 May 2018

== League table ==
Pos	Team	Pld	W	D	L	GF	GA	GD	Pts	Promotion, qualification or relegation
1	Accrington Stanley (C, P)	46	29	6	11	76	46	+30	93	Promotion to EFL League One
2	Luton Town (P)	46	25	13	8	94	46	+48	88	Promotion to EFL League One
3	Wycombe Wanderers (P)	46	24	12	10	79	60	+19	84	Promotion to EFL League One
4	Exeter City	46	24	8	14	64	54	+10	80	Qualification for League Two play-offs (Note: Four teams play for one spot and promotion to EFL League One.)
5	Notts County	46	21	14	11	71	48	+23	77	Qualification for League Two play-offs
6	Coventry City (O, P)	46	22	9	15	64	47	+17	75	Qualification for League Two play-offs
7	Lincoln City	46	20	15	11	64	48	+16	75	Qualification for League Two play-offs
8	Mansfield Town	46	18	18	10	67	52	+15	72	
9	Swindon Town	46	20	8	18	67	65	+2	68	
10	Carlisle United	46	17	16	13	62	54	+8	67	
11	Newport County	46	16	16	14	56	58	−2	64	
12	Cambridge United	46	17	13	16	56	60	−4	64	
13	Colchester United	46	16	14	16	53	52	+1	62	
14	Crawley Town	46	16	11	19	58	66	−8	59	
15	Crewe Alexandra	46	17	5	24	62	75	−13	56	
16	Stevenage	46	14	13	19	60	65	−5	55	
17	Cheltenham Town	46	13	12	21	67	73	−6	51	
18	Grimsby Town	46	13	12	21	42	66	−24	51	
19	Yeovil Town	46	12	12	22	59	75	−16	48	
20	Port Vale	46	11	14	21	49	67	−18	47	
21	Forest Green Rovers	46	13	8	25	54	77	−23	47	
22	Morecambe	46	9	19	18	41	56	−15	46	
23	Barnet (R)	46	12	10	24	46	65	−19	46	Relegation to the National League
24	Chesterfield (R)	46	10	8	28	47	83	−36	38	Relegation to the National League

Source: BBC Sport
Rules for classification: 1) Points; 2) Goal difference; 3) Number of goals scored
(C) Champions; (O) Play-off winners; (P) Promoted; (R) Relegated

== Play-offs ==
Semi-finals
4	Exeter City	0	3	3
7	Lincoln City	0	1	1
5	Notts County	1	1	2
6	Coventry City	1	4	5

Final
4	Exeter City	1
6	Coventry City	3

== Results ==
Home \ Away	ACC	BAR	CAM	CRL	CHL	CHF	COL	COV	CRA	CRE	EXE	FGR	GRI	LIN	LUT	MAN	MOR	NPC	NTC	PTV	STE	SWI	WYC	YEO
Accrington Stanley		4–1	1–0	3–0	1–1	4–0	3–1	1–0	2–3	1–0	1–1	3–1	1–2	1–0	0–2	2–1	1–0	1–1	1–0	3–2	3–2	2–1	1–0	2–0
Barnet	1–1		3–1	1–3	0–2	3–0	0–1	0–0	1–2	2–1	1–2	1–0	0–2	1–1	1–0	1–1	2–1	2–0	1–0	1–1	0–1	1–2	0–2	1–1
Cambridge United	0–0	1–0		1–2	4–3	2–1	1–0	2–1	3–1	3–1	2–3	3–0	3–1	0–0	1–1	0–0	0–0	1–2	1–0	5–0	1–0	1–3	1–3	2–1
Carlisle United	3–1	1–1	1–1		3–0	2–0	1–1	0–1	2–2	1–0	0–1	1–0	2–0	0–1	1–1	1–1	1–1	1–1	1–1	1–2	0–2	1–2	3–3	4–0
Cheltenham Town	0–2	1–1	0–0	0–1		1–1	3–1	1–6	1–0	1–0	3–4	0–1	2–3	1–0	2–2	3–0	3–0	1–1	1–1	5–1	0–1	2–1	0–2	0–2
Chesterfield	1–2	2–1	2–3	2–2	0–2		0–0	0–0	1–2	0–2	1–0	3–2	1–3	1–3	2–0	0–1	0–2	1–0	3–1	2–0	0–1	2–1	1–2	2–3
Colchester United	0–1	0–1	0–0	0–1	1–4	1–1		2–1	3–1	3–1	3–1	5–1	1–1	1–0	2–1	2–0	0–0	2–0	1–3	1–1	1–1	0–0	1–2	0–1
Coventry City	0–2	1–0	3–1	2–0	2–1	1–0	0–0		1–1	1–0	2–0	0–1	4–0	2–4	2–2	0–1	0–0	0–1	3–0	1–0	3–1	3–1	3–2	2–6
Crawley Town	2–1	2–0	0–1	0–1	3–5	0–2	0–2	1–2		1–2	3–1	1–1	3–0	3–1	0–0	2–0	1–1	1–2	0–1	1–3	1–0	1–1	2–3	2–0
Crewe Alexandra	0–2	1–0	0–1	0–5	2–1	5–1	1–0	1–2	3–0		1–2	3–1	2–0	1–4	1–2	2–2	1–0	1–1	2–0	2–2	1–0	0–3	2–3	0–0
Exeter City	2–0	2–1	1–0	1–1	2–1	2–1	1–0	1–0	2–2	3–0		2–0	2–0	1–0	1–4	0–1	4–1	1–0	0–3	0–1	2–1	3–1	1–1	0–0
Forest Green Rovers	0–1	2–2	5–2	0–1	1–1	4–1	1–2	2–1	2–0	3–2	1–3		0–3	0–1	0–2	2–0	2–0	0–4	1–2	1–0	3–1	0–2	1–2	4–3
Grimsby Town	0–3	2–2	0–0	0–1	1–1	1–0	2–2	0–2	0–0	1–0	0–1	1–0		0–0	0–1	1–1	0–2	1–2	2–1	1–1	0–0	3–2	2–3	2–1
Lincoln City	2–0	2–1	0–0	4–1	1–0	2–1	2–1	1–2	0–0	1–4	3–2	2–1	3–1		0–0	0–1	1–1	3–1	2–2	3–1	3–0	2–2	0–0	1–1
Luton Town	1–2	2–0	7–0	3–0	2–2	1–0	3–0	0–3	4–1	3–1	1–0	3–1	2–0	4–2		2–1	1–0	3–1	1–1	2–0	7–1	0–3	2–3	8–2
Mansfield Town	0–1	3–1	2–1	3–1	3–2	2–2	1–1	1–1	1–1	3–4	1–1	2–0	4–1	1–1	2–2		2–1	5–0	3–1	1–1	1–0	1–3	0–0	0–0
Morecambe	1–2	0–1	0–0	1–1	2–1	2–2	0–0	2–0	0–1	0–1	2–1	1–1	0–0	0–0	0–0	1–2		2–1	1–4	0–3	1–1	0–1	2–1	4–3
Newport County	2–1	1–2	2–1	3–3	1–0	4–1	1–2	1–1	2–1	1–2	2–1	3–3	1–0	0–0	1–1	1–1	1–1		0–0	1–1	0–1	2–1	0–0	2–0
Notts County	2–2	2–1	3–3	2–1	3–1	2–0	2–1	2–1	1–2	4–1	1–2	1–1	0–0	4–1	0–0	1–1	2–0	3–0		1–0	2–0	1–0	0–0	4–1
Port Vale	1–2	1–0	2–0	1–2	3–1	2–1	2–2	1–0	1–2	0–1	0–1	1–1	1–2	1–0	4–0	0–4	0–0	0–0	0–1		2–2	0–3	2–3	1–1
Stevenage	3–2	4–1	0–2	0–0	4–1	5–1	0–1	1–1	1–1	2–2	3–1	1–2	3–1	1–2	1–1	1–1	2–1	3–3	1–1	2–0		0–1	0–0	4–1
Swindon Town	3–0	1–4	2–0	0–0	0–3	2–2	2–3	1–2	0–3	4–3	1–1	1–0	0–1	0–1	0–5	1–0	1–1	0–1	1–0	3–2	3–2		1–0	2–2
Wycombe Wanderers	0–4	3–1	1–1	4–3	3–3	1–0	3–1	0–1	4–0	3–2	0–0	3–1	2–1	2–2	1–2	1–2	2–4	2–0	2–4	0–0	1–0	3–2		2–1
Yeovil Town	3–2	2–0	2–0	0–1	0–0	1–2	0–1	2–0	1–2	2–0	3–1	0–0	3–0	0–2	0–3	2–3	2–2	0–2	1–1	1–1	3–0	1–2	0–1	

Updated to match(es) played on 5 May 2018. Source: BBC Sport
Legend: Blue = home team win; Yellow = draw; Red = away team win.

== Top scorers ==
As of 5 May 2018

Rank	Player	Club	Goals
1	(Northern Ireland) Billy Kee	Accrington Stanley	25
2	(Sudan) Mohamed Eisa	Cheltenham Town	23
2	(Scotland) Marc McNulty	Coventry City	23
4	(England) Danny Hylton	Luton Town	21
5	(Wales) Christian Doidge	Forest Green Rovers	20
6	(Republic of Ireland) James Collins	Luton Town	19
6	(England) Jayden Stockley	Exeter City	19
6	(England) Kristian Dennis	Chesterfield	19
9	(England) Adebayo Akinfenwa	Wycombe Wanderers	17
9	(England) Tom Pope	Port Vale	17
