= 2016–17 Accrington Stanley F.C. season =

Accrington Stanley F.C.
2016–17 season
- Chairman: Peter Marsden
- Manager: John Coleman
- Stadium: Wham Stadium
- League Two: 13th place
- FA Cup: Fourth round (knocked out by Middlesbrough)
- EFL Cup: Third round (knocked out by West Ham United)
- EFL Trophy: Knocked out in the group stage
- Top goalscorer: League: 13 goals Billy Kee; All: 15 goals Billy Kee
- Highest home attendance: 3,170 against Burnley (2nd round of EFL Cup)
- Lowest home attendance: 547 against Wolverhampton Wanderers U23 (EFL Trophy group stage)
Home colours	Away colours

The 2016–17 season was Accrington Stanley's eleventh consecutive season in League Two and their 48th year in existence. Along with competing in League Two, the club also participated in the FA Cup, League Cup and League Trophy. The season covered the period from 1 July 2016 to 30 June 2017.

== Transfers ==
=== Transfers in ===
Date from	Position	Nationality	Name	From	Fee	Ref.
1 July 2016	CB	ENG	Omar Beckles	Aldershot Town	Free transfer	
1 July 2016	GK	ENG	Aaron Chapman	Chesterfield	Free transfer	
1 July 2016	CM	FRA	Bastien Héry	Carlisle United	Free transfer	
1 July 2016	GK	ENG	Elliot Parish	Colchester United	Free transfer	
1 July 2016	LB	ENG	Frazer Shaw	Leyton Orient	Free transfer	
11 July 2016	CM	ENG	Steven Hewitt	Southport	Free transfer	
21 July 2016	CM	ENG	Paddy Lacey	Barrow	Free transfer	
22 July 2016	LW	ENG	Luke Wall	Blackburn Rovers	Free transfer	
1 August 2016	LM	WAL	Arron Davies	Exeter City	Free transfer	
2 August 2016	AM	ENG	Jordan Clark	Shrewsbury Town	Free transfer	
5 August 2016	CB	LCA	Janoi Donacien	Aston Villa	Free transfer	
5 August 2016	RW	ENG	Chris Eagles	Bury	Free transfer	
13 August 2016	GK	IRL	Paul White	Boreham Wood	Free transfer	
30 August 2016	LB	NIR	Rory McKeown	Raith Rovers	Free transfer	
3 October 2016	RW	ENG	Gary Taylor-Fletcher	Tranmere Rovers	Free transfer	
13 February 2017	LW	POR	Érico Sousa	Tadcaster Albion	Free transfer	

=== Transfers out ===
Date from	Position	Nationality	Name	To	Fee	Ref.
1 July 2016	AM	ENG	Anthony Barry	Wrexham	Free transfer	
1 July 2016	CF	ENG	Marcus Carver	Chorley	Free transfer	
1 July 2016	DM	ENG	Matt Crooks	Rangers	Free transfer	
1 July 2016	CB	ENG	Tom Davies	Portsmouth	Free transfer	
1 July 2016	GK	ENG	Ross Etheridge	Doncaster Rovers	Free transfer	
1 July 2016	RM	ENG	Piero Mingoia	Cambridge United	Free transfer	
1 July 2016	GK	NIR	Jason Mooney	Cliftonville (Note: Following Mooney's release, he signed for Cliftonville.)	Released	
1 July 2016	CM	ENG	Andrew Procter	Retired	—N/a	
1 July 2016	CB	ENG	Keenan Quansah	Burscough (Note: Following Quansah's release, he signed for Burscough.)	Released	
1 July 2016	CM	ENG	Kealan Steenson	Ashton United	Released	
1 July 2016	CB	ENG	Liam Wakefield	Morecambe (Note: Following Wakefield's release, he signed for Morecambe.)	Released	
1 July 2016	AM	ENG	Josh Windass	Rangers	Free transfer	
1 July 2016	CB	ENG	Dean Winnard	Morecambe	Free transfer	
4 August 2016	LB	ENG	Adam Buxton	Portsmouth	Free transfer	
8 August 2016	MF	ENG	John Roberts	Macclesfield Town	Free transfer	
22 August 2016	LB	ENG	Frazer Shaw	East Thurrock United (Note: Following Shaw's departure, he signed for East Thurrock United.)	Mutual consent	
28 October 2016	CF	ENG	Max Hazeldine	Skelmersdale United	Free transfer	
9 January 2017	RW	ENG	Chris Eagles	Port Vale (Note: Following Eagles' release, he signed for Port Vale.)	Released	
17 January 2017	CM	FRA	Bastien Héry	Limerick	Mutual consent	
23 March 2017	LW	POR	Érico Sousa	Tranmere Rovers (Note: Registration issues have meant he has been unable to play for Accrington)	Mutual consent	

=== Loans in ===
Date from	Position	Nationality	Name	From	Date until	Ref.
1 July 2016	CB	ENG	Callam Jones	West Bromwich Albion	1 January 2017	
8 August 2016	RM	IRL	John O'Sullivan	Blackburn Rovers	7 January 2017	
31 August 2016	RB	ENG	Zak Vyner	Bristol City	3 January 2017	
1 January 2017	CF	ENG	Jonathan Edwards	Hull City	End of Season	
1 January 2017	CB	ENG	Harvey Rodgers	Hull City	End of Season	
13 January 2017	GK	SVK	Marek Rodák	Fulham	End of Season	
20 January 2017	CM	ENG	Sean Clare	Sheffield Wednesday	End of Season	
31 January 2017	AM	ENG	Noor Husin	Crystal Palace	End of Season	

=== Loans out ===
Date from	Position	Nationality	Name	To	Date until	Ref.
19 August 2016	CF	ENG	Brayden Shaw	(Wales) Bangor City	27 January 2017	

== Competitions ==
=== Pre-season friendlies ===
Win Draw Loss

19 July 2016 Friendly	Skelmersdale United	1–1	Accrington Stanley	Skelmersdale
19:45 BST	Brodie 90'	Report	Shaw 10'	Stadium: West Lancashire College Stadium

23 July 2016 Friendly	Stalybridge Celtic	4–1	Accrington Stanley	Stalybridge
15:00 BST	Farrell 6'; Osei 49'; Pilkington 84'; Chalmers 86' (pen.)	Report	Trialist 28'	Stadium: Bower Fold

30 July 2016 Friendly	FC Halifax Town	0–0	Accrington Stanley	Halifax
15:00 BST		Report		Stadium: The Shay

=== League Two ===
Matchday	1	2	3	4	5	6	7	8	9	10	11	12	13	14	15	16	17	18	19	20	21	22	23	24	25	26	27	28	29	30	31	32	33	34	35	36	37	38	39	40	41	42	43	44	45	46
Ground	H	A	A	H	H	A	A	H	A	H	A	H	H	A	H	A	H	A	H	A	H	A	A	H	A	H	H	A	A	H	A	H	H	A	H	A	A	H	H	A	H	A	H	A	H	A
Result	W	L	D	L	L	D	W	W	W	D	L	D	W	D	L	L	L	L	D	L	L	L	W	D	L	D	W	L	D	W	D	D	W	W	W	D	W	D	W	W	W	D	W	L	L	W
Position	5	14	15	18	20	21	16	11	10	11	12	11	7	7	9	11	15	18	19	21	21	22	20	20	21	20	19	21	20	19	20	21	20	18	16	16	14	15	13	13	12	12	11	13	13	13

Updated to match(es) played on 6 May 2017. Source: Statto.com
A = Away; H = Home; W = Win; D = Draw; L = Loss

==== League table ====
Pos	Team	Pld	W	D	L	GF	GA	GD	Pts
11	Cambridge United	46	19	9	18	58	50	+8	66
12	Mansfield Town	46	17	15	14	54	50	+4	66
13	Accrington Stanley	46	17	14	15	59	56	+3	65
14	Grimsby Town	46	17	11	18	59	63	−4	62
15	Barnet	46	14	15	17	57	64	−7	57

Updated to match(es) played on 6 May 2017. Source: BBC Sport
Rules for classification: 1) Points; 2) Goal difference; 3) Number of goals scored

==== Matches ====
Win Draw Loss

==== August ====
6 August 2016 1	Accrington Stanley	3–2	Doncaster Rovers	Accrington
15:00 BST	Boco 8'; Brown (yellow card) 24'; Pearson 29'; Donacien (yellow card) 51'; McCartan (yellow card) 89'; McConville 90+1'	Report	Rowe 12'; Calder (yellow card) 43'; Williams 82'; Mandeville (yellow card) 86'	Stadium: Wham Stadium; Attendance: 2,647; Referee: Seb Stockbridge

13 August 2016 2	Barnet	2–0	Accrington Stanley	Canons Park
15:00 BST	Akinde 33' (yellow card) 50'; Akpa Akpro 60'	Report		Stadium: The Hive Stadium; Attendance: 1,501; Referee: Scott Duncan

16 August 2016 3	Wycombe Wanderers	1–1	Accrington Stanley	High Wycombe
15:00 BST	Akinfenwa 5'; Jacobson (yellow card) 45+2'; Thompson (yellow card) 83'	Report	McConville (yellow card) 6' (goal) 48'; Eagles (yellow card) 26'; Pearson (yellow card) 44'	Stadium: Adams Park; Attendance: 2,747; Referee: Brendan Malone

20 August 2016 4	Accrington Stanley	1–2	Exeter City	Accrington
15:00 BST	Pearson (yellow card) 24'; Conneely (yellow card) 59'; Davies 70'; Beckles (yellow card) 85'; Hughes (yellow card) 90'		Simpson (yellow card) 23'; Brown (yellow card) 57'; Harley 66'; Taylor 72' (yellow card) 74'	Stadium: Wham Stadium; Attendance: 1,300; Referee: Ross Joyce

27 August 2016 5	Accrington Stanley	2–3	Morecambe	Accrington
15:00 BST	Kee 27', 34'; Hughes (red card) 36'; Conneely (yellow card) 37'; Parish (yellow card) 45+2'; O'Sullivan (yellow card) 49'	Report	Stockton 45+1', 57' (yellow card) 54'; Ellison 46' (yellow card) 76'; Rose (yellow card) 83'; Edwards (yellow card) 90+2'	Stadium: Wham Stadium; Attendance: 1,763; Referee: Mike Jones

==== September ====
3 September 2016 6	Carlisle United	1–1	Accrington Stanley	Carlisle
15:00 BST	Joyce (yellow card) 59'; Adams 65'; Miller (yellow card) 80'	Report	Kee 58'; Vyner (yellow card) 60'; McConville (yellow card) 72'	Stadium: Brunton Park; Attendance: 5,128; Referee: Carl Boyeson

10 September 2016 7	Notts County	0–2	Accrington Stanley	Nottingham
15:00 BST	Audel (yellow card) 21'; Duffy (yellow card) 28'	Report	O'Sullivan 17'; Donacien (yellow card) 31'; Conneely (yellow card) 54'; Boco 67'	Stadium: Meadow Lane Stadium; Attendance: 3,988; Referee: Brett Huxtable

17 September 2016 8	Accrington Stanley	1–0	Portsmouth	Accrington
15:00 BST	McConville (yellow card) 46'; Lacey 52'	Report	Davies (yellow card) 86'	Stadium: Wham Stadium; Attendance: 2,461; Referee: Mark Haywood

24 September 2016 9	Colchester United	1–2	Accrington Stanley	Colchester
15:00 BST	Wright 7'; Porter (yellow card) 23'; Slater (yellow card) 50'	Report	Lacey (yellow card) 24'; McConville (yellow card) 55'; Boco 59'; Kee 68'; Brown (yellow card) 75' (yellow-red card) 90+2'; Gornell (yellow card) 83'	Stadium: Weston Homes Community Stadium; Attendance: 3,109; Referee: Graham Horwood

27 September 2016 10	Accrington Stanley	1–1	Mansfield Town	Accrington
19:45 BST	Gornell 56'; Lacey (yellow card) 74'; Kee (yellow card) 90'	Report	Clements 31'; Hurst (yellow card) 56'	Stadium: Wham Stadium; Attendance: 1,134; Referee: Darren England

==== October ====
2 October 2016 11	Cambridge United	2–1	Accrington Stanley	Cambridge
15:00 BST	Legge 14' (yellow card) 23' (yellow-red card) 90'; Mingoia 81'; Halliday (red card) 90+2'	Report	Kee 51'; Donacien (yellow card) 53'; Clark (yellow card) 68'; McConville (yellow card) 70'; Eagles (penalty missed) 90+1; Gornell (penalty missed) 90+2	Stadium: The R Costings Abbey Stadium; Attendance: 3,765; Referee: Ollie Yates

8 October 2016 12	Accrington Stanley	1–1	Cheltenham Town	Accrington
15:00 BST	Gornell 74'	Report	Pell (yellow card) 16'; Dickie (yellow card) 16' (goal) 89'; O'Shaughnessy (yellow card) 23' (yellow-red card) 66'	Stadium: Wham Stadium; Attendance: 1,637; Referee: Nigel Miller

15 October 2016 13	Accrington Stanley	2–1	Blackpool	Accrington
15:00 BST	Brown (yellow card) 80'; Boco 89' (pen.), 90+4'; Conneely (yellow card) 90'	Report	Cain 81'	Stadium: Wham Stadium; Attendance: 2,754; Referee: Andy Haines

22 October 2016 14	Crawley Town	0–0	Accrington Stanley	Crawley
15:00 BST	Kaby Djaló (yellow card) 64'; Tajbakhsh (yellow card) 90'	Report	Pearson (yellow card) 45+2'	Stadium: Checkatrade.com Stadium; Attendance: 2,092; Referee: Brendan Malone

29 October 2016 15	Accrington Stanley	1–3	Newport County	Accrington
15:00 BST	Gornell (yellow card) 44'; Donacien 79'; McCartan (yellow card) 85'	Report	Healey 47'; Rigg (yellow card) 56'; Barnum-Bobb 62'; Myrie-Williams (yellow card) 65'; Sheehan (yellow card) 90+1' (goal) 90+4'	Stadium: Wham Stadium; Attendance: 1,251; Referee: Robert Jones

==== November ====
12 November 2016 16	Luton Town	1–0	Accrington Stanley	Luton
15:00 GMT	McGeehan 75' (yellow card) 90+5'; Cook (yellow card) 78' (yellow-red card) 83'	Report	Parish (yellow card) 77'; Clark (yellow card) 90+5'	Stadium: Kenilworth Road; Attendance: 8,008; Referee: Brett Huxtable

19 November 2016 17	Accrington Stanley	0–1	Stevenage	Accrington
15:00 GMT	Pearson (yellow card) 55'; McConville (yellow card) 72'; Vyner (yellow card) 81'	Report	Godden (yellow card) 55' (goal) 71'; Schumacher (yellow card) 61'; McAnuff (yellow card) 90+5'	Stadium: Wham Stadium; Attendance: 1,283; Referee: Michael Salisbury

22 November 2016 18	Hartlepool United	2–0	Accrington Stanley	Hartlepool
19:45 GMT	Nsiala (yellow card) 43'; Amond (penalty missed) 62'; Deverdics 62'; Alessandra 90+2'	Report	Brown (yellow card) 57'; Hughes (red card) 60'; McConville (yellow card) 62'; Kee (yellow card) 64'; McCartan (yellow card) 65'; Beckles (yellow card) 73'	Stadium: The Northern Gas and Power Stadium; Attendance: 2,514; Referee: Richard Clark

26 November 2016 19	Accrington Stanley	1–1	Yeovil Town	Accrington
15:00 GMT	Boco 90+1'	Report	Khan 51'	Stadium: Wham Stadium; Attendance: 1,263; Referee: Dean Whitestone

==== December ====
10 December 2016 20	Leyton Orient	1–0	Accrington Stanley	Leyton, London
15:00 GMT	Simpson 65'; McCallum (yellow card) 90+2'	Report	O'Sullivan (yellow card) 24'; McConville (red card) 24'	Stadium: Matchroom Stadium; Attendance: 3,964; Referee: Darren Drysdale

17 December 2016 21	Accrington Stanley	0–1	Plymouth Argyle	Accrington
15:00 GMT	Hughes (yellow card) 65'	Report	Tanner (yellow card) 64' (goal) 76'; Garita (yellow card) 82'	Stadium: Wham Stadium; Attendance: 1,573; Referee: Scott Duncan

26 December 2016 22	Grimsby Town	2–0	Accrington Stanley	Cleethorpes
15:00 GMT	Bolarinwa 32'; Bogle (yellow card) 50'; Andrew (yellow card) 68'; Chambers 88'	Report	O'Sullivan (yellow card) 62'; Pearson (yellow card) 81'	Stadium: Blundell Park; Attendance: 5,782; Referee: Ross Joyce

31 December 2016 23	Crewe Alexandra	0–1	Accrington Stanley	Crewe
15:00 GMT		Report	Donacien (yellow card) 28'; Kee 43'; Conneely (yellow card) 59'	Stadium: Alexandra Stadium; Attendance: 3,471; Referee: Eddie Ilderton

==== January ====
2 January 2017 24	Accrington Stanley	2–2	Hartlepool United	Accrington
15:00 GMT	McConville (yellow card) 14'; Kee 57' (pen.); Pearson 70'; Donacien (yellow card) 80'	Report	Amond 60'; Donnelly (yellow card) 81'; Harrison 86'	Stadium: Wham Stadium; Attendance: 1,590; Referee: Graham Salisbury

14 January 2017 25	Cheltenham Town	3–0	Accrington Stanley	Cheltenham
15:00 GMT	Winchester (yellow card) 52'; Wright 55'; De Girolamo 74'; Waters 78'	Report	Brown (red card) 62'; Donacien (yellow card) 90'; Gornell (yellow card) 90+3'	Stadium: LCI Rail Stadium; Attendance: 2,854; Referee: Lee Swabey

21 January 2017 26	Accrington Stanley	1–1	Carlisle United	Accrington
15:00 GMT	Pearson (red card) 62'; Beckles 20' (o.g.); McCartan 21'; Kee (yellow card) 56'; McConville (yellow card) 62'	Report	Liddle (yellow card) 18'; Raynes (yellow card) 30'	Stadium: Wham Stadium; Attendance: 2,634; Referee: Christopher Sarginson

==== February ====
4 February 2017 27	Accrington Stanley	2–0	Notts County	Accrington
15:00 GMT	Rodgers 45'; Husin 80'	Report	Ameobi (yellow card) 71'	Stadium: Wham Stadium; Attendance: 1,731; Referee: Darren Drysdale

11 February 2017 28	Portsmouth	2–0	Accrington Stanley	Portsmouth
15:00 GMT	Clarke 2'; Doyle (yellow card) 41'; Naismith 90+2'	Report	Conneely (yellow card) 56'; Donacien (yellow card) 79'	Stadium: Fratton Park; Attendance: 15,955; Referee: Gavin Ward

14 February 2017 29	Mansfield Town	4–4	Accrington Stanley	Mansfield
19:45 GMT	A. MacDonald (yellow card) 27'; Bennett 33' (yellow card) 51'; Byrom (yellow card) 42'; White 45+2'; Coulthirst 63' (pen.); Collins (yellow card) 85'; Arquin 89'	Report	Beckles 5' (yellow card) 61'; Donacien (yellow card) 22'; McCartan (yellow card) 18' (goal) 29'; Pearson (yellow card) 33'; Kee 43', 66' (pen.) (yellow card) 80'; Conneely (yellow card) 62'	Stadium: Field Mill; Attendance: 3,226; Referee: Mark Heywood

18 February 2017 30	Accrington Stanley	2–1	Colchester United	Accrington
15:00 GMT	Kee 18'; Pearson 32'; Beckles (red card) 45'; McConville (yellow card) 75'	Report	Guthrie (yellow card) 30'; Elokobi (yellow card) 46'; Wynter (yellow card) 61'; Porter 76' (pen.)	Stadium: Wham Stadium; Attendance: 1,310; Referee: Richard Clark

25 February 2017 31	Doncaster Rovers	2–2	Accrington Stanley	Doncaster
15:00 GMT	Rowe 20' (yellow card) 68'; Mason (yellow card) 42'; Marquis 58'	Report	McCartan 4' (yellow card) 42'; Hughes (yellow card) 67'; Edwards 81'; Pearson (yellow card) 86'	Stadium: Keepmoat Stadium; Attendance: 5,272; Referee: Robert Lewis

28 February 2017 32	Accrington Stanley	2–2	Wycombe Wanderers	Accrington
19:45 GMT	Clare 45+2'; Pearson 63'	Report	Akinfenwa 56', 58' de Havilland (yellow card) 73'	Stadium: Wham Stadium; Attendance: 1,045; Referee: Mark Brown

==== March ====
4 March 2017 33	Accrington Stanley	1–0	Barnet	Accrington
15:00 GMT	Clare (yellow card) 43'; McCartan 54'	Report	Bover (yellow card) 22'; Akinnde (yellow card) 33'; Dembele (yellow card) 67'	Stadium: Wham Stadium; Attendance: 1,236; Referee: Mark Haywood

11 March 2017 34	Exeter City	0–2	Accrington Stanley	Exeter
15:00 GMT	Sweeney (yellow card) 10'	Report	McCartan 11'; Pearson (yellow card) 28' (goal) 71'; Rodgers (yellow card) 69'	Stadium: St James Park; Attendance: 3,897; Referee: Charles Breakspear

14 March 2017 35	Accrington Stanley	5–0	Leyton Orient	Accrington
19:45 GMT	Kee 44'; Pearson 51', 90+1'; McConville 84', 85'	Report	Kennedy (yellow card) 11'; Collins (yellow card) 50'	Stadium: Wham Stadium; Attendance: 1,306; Referee: Graham Salisbury

18 March 2017 36	Yeovil Town	1–1	Accrington Stanley	Yeovil
15:00 GMT	François Zoko 74'	Report	McConville (yellow card) 21'; Brown (red card) 22'; Beckles 51'; Rodgers (yellow card) 65'	Stadium: Huish Park; Attendance: 2,991; Referee: Nigel Miller

21 March 2017 37	Morecambe	1–2	Accrington Stanley	Morecambe
19:45 GMT	Whitmore (yellow card) 8'; Ellison (yellow card) 45+1'; Conlan (yellow card) 81'; Wildig 82'; Ryan Edwards (yellow card) 86'	Report	McCartan 45+2', 66'; Rodgers (yellow card) 81'	Stadium: Globe Arena; Attendance: 1,506; Referee: Oliver Langford

25 March 2017 38	Accrington Stanley	1–1	Grimsby Town	Accrington
15:00 GMT	McConville 89'	Report	Asante 70'; Gunning (yellow card) 87'	Stadium: Wham Stadium; Attendance: 2,312; Referee: Mark Heywood

28 March 2017 39	Accrington Stanley	2–0	Cambridge United	Accrington
19:45 BST	McConville 19'; McCartan 54'	Report	Berry (yellow card) 33'	Stadium: Wham Stadium; Attendance: 1,333; Referee: John Busby

==== April ====
1 April 2017 40	Plymouth Argyle	0–1	Accrington Stanley	Plymouth
15:00 BST	Songo'o (yellow card) 81'	Report	Clark 8'; McCartan (yellow card) 16'; Husin (yellow card) 71'; Donacien (yellow card) 76'	Stadium: Home Park; Attendance: 9,708; Referee: Darren Deadman

8 April 2017 41	Accrington Stanley	3–2	Crewe Alexandra	Accrington
15:00 BST	Hughes 57', 79'; McCartan 61' (yellow card) 86'; Kee (yellow card) 75'	Report	Ray (yellow card) 12'; Cooke 15'; Dagnall 41' (yellow card) 61'	Stadium: Wham Stadium; Attendance: 1,720; Referee: Ross Joyce

14 April 2017 42	Blackpool	0–0	Accrington Stanley	Blackpool
15:00 BST	Robertson (yellow card) 57'; Odelusi (yellow card) 72'; Vassell (penalty missed) 76'	Report	Hughes (yellow card) 66'; Rodgers (yellow card) 86'; McCartan (yellow card) 89'	Stadium: Bloomfield Road; Attendance: 4,300; Referee: Mark Brown

17 April 2017 43	Accrington Stanley	1–0	Crawley Town	Accrington
15:00 BST	Hughes (yellow card) 40'; McCartan 48'	Report	McNerney (yellow card) 53'	Stadium: Wham Stadium; Attendance: 1,652; Referee: David Webb

22 April 2017 44	Newport County	1–0	Accrington Stanley	Newport
15:00 BST	Rigg (yellow card) 29'; O'Brien (yellow card) 38'; Randall 60'; Owen-Evans (yellow card) 90+6'	Report	Brown (yellow card) 83'; McCartan (yellow card) 90+1'	Stadium: Rodney Parade; Attendance: 3,719; Referee: Mark Heywood

29 April 2017 45	Accrington Stanley	1–4	Luton Town	Accrington
15:00 BST	Pearson 39'	Report	Justin 48'; Beckles 49' (o.g.); Vassell 54'; Marriott 90+2'	Stadium: Wham Stadium; Attendance: 2,150; Referee: Christopher Sarginson

==== May ====
6 May 2017 46	Stevenage	0–3	Accrington Stanley	Stevenage
17:30 BST	Wells (yellow card) 40'; McAnuff (yellow card) 65'	Report	Pearson (yellow card) 62'; Kee 72' (pen.), 79'; McConville (yellow card) 81'; Conneely 90+4' (pen.)	Stadium: Broadhall Way; Attendance: 3,517; Referee: Geoff Eltringham

=== FA Cup ===
Win Draw Loss

5 November 2016 First round	Bradford City	1–2	Accrington Stanley	Bradford
15:00 GMT	Kilgallon 72'	Report	Boco 30'; Clark 80'	Stadium: Valley Parade; Attendance: 4,985; Referee: Graham Salisbury

4 December 2016 Second round	Woking	0–3	Accrington Stanley	Woking
14:00 GMT	Yakubu (yellow card) 18'; Carter (red card) 36'	Report	Kee 34', 42'; Lacey (yellow card) 54'; O'Sullivan 61'	Stadium: Kingfield Stadium; Attendance: 3,718; Referee: Nick Kinseley

7 January 2017 Third round	Accrington Stanley	2–1	Luton Town	Accrington
15:00 GMT	McConville 45+2'; Beckles 57'	Report	Gray 54'; Rea (red card) 90+4'	Stadium: Crown Ground; Attendance: 1,717; Referee: Darren Deadman

28 January 2017 Fourth round	Middlesbrough	1–0	Accrington Stanley	Middlesbrough
15:00 GMT	Leadbitter (yellow card) 64'; Downing 69' (yellow card) 88'; Clayton (yellow card) 81'; Gibson (yellow card) 90+4'	Report	Conneely (yellow card) 14'; Clare (yellow card) 85'; Rodgers (yellow card) 90+5'	Stadium: Riverside Stadium; Attendance: 24,040; Referee: Anthony Taylor

=== EFL Cup ===
Win Draw Loss

9 August 2016 First round	Accrington Stanley	0–0 (a.e.t.) (11–10 p)	Bradford City	Accrington
19:45 BST	Parish (red card) 74'; Pearson (yellow card) 103'; Donacien (yellow card) 116'	Report	Knight-Percival (yellow card) 91'; Vincelot (yellow card) 93'	Stadium: Crown Ground; Attendance: 1,936; Referee: David Webb
	Penalties
	Hughes (penalty missed); Clark (penalty scored); Hewitt (penalty scored); McCartan (penalty scored); Pearson (penalty scored); Conneely (penalty scored); Beckles (penalty scored); Donacien (penalty scored); Chapman (penalty scored); Hughes (penalty scored); Clark (penalty scored)		McMahon (penalty scored); Webb-Foster (penalty scored); Hanson (penalty scored); Morais (penalty scored); Law (penalty missed); Marshall (penalty scored); Vincelot (penalty scored); Knight-Percival (penalty scored); Devine (penalty scored); Doyle (penalty scored); McMahon (penalty scored); Webb-Foster (penalty missed)

24 August 2016 Second round	Accrington Stanley	1–0 (a.e.t.)	Burnley	Accrington
19:45 BST	McCartan (yellow card) 16'; Conneely (yellow card) 38'; Pearson 120'; Donacien (yellow card) 120+2'		Vokes (yellow card) 31'; Ulvestad (yellow card) 79'	Stadium: Crown Ground; Attendance: 3,170; Referee: Tony Harrington

21 September 2016 Third round	West Ham United	1–0	Accrington Stanley	Stratford, London
19:45 BST	Payet 90+6'		Boco (yellow card) 90+5'	Stadium: London Stadium; Attendance: 39,877; Referee: Steve Martin

=== EFL Trophy ===
Pos	Div	Team	Pld	W	PW	PL	L	GF	GA	GD	Pts	Qualification
1	ACA	Wolverhampton Wanderers U21	3	2	0	0	1	8	4	+4	6	Advance to Round 2
2	L1	Chesterfield	3	2	0	0	1	5	5	0	6	Advance to Round 2
3	L2	Crewe Alexandra	3	1	0	0	2	5	5	0	3	
4	L2	Accrington Stanley	3	1	0	0	2	4	8	−4	3	

Source: Sky Sports

Win Draw Loss

30 August 2016 Group stage game 1	Accrington Stanley	0–3	Crewe Alexandra	Accrington
19:45 BST	Pearson (yellow card) 45'	Report	Kirk (yellow card) 45+1'; Ainley 47'; Jones (yellow card) 57'; Bakayogo (yellow card) 62'; Cooper 76'; Nugent (yellow card) 80'; Udoh 90+3'	Stadium: Crown Ground; Attendance: 585; Referee: Darren Handley

4 October 2016 Group stage game 2	Chesterfield	1–4	Accrington Stanley	Chesterfield
19:45 BST	Dennis 61'; Liddle (yellow card) 82'	Report	Taylor-Fletcher 14'; Gornell 21', 66'; Clark 42'; Hewitt (yellow card) 65'	Stadium: Proact Stadium; Attendance: 976; Referee: David Coote

8 November 2016 Group stage game 3	Wolverhampton Wanderers U23	4–0	Accrington Stanley	Wolverhampton
19:45 GMT	Herc 18'; Wilson 37'; Ronan 45+3' (pen.); Enobakhare 67'	Report	Hewitt (yellow card) 39'	Stadium: Molineux Stadium; Attendance: 547; Referee: David Webb

=== Appearances ===
Numbers in parentheses denote appearances as substitute.

As of match played 17:44, 6 May 2017 (UTC)

Sortable table
No.	Pos.	Nat.	Name	League 2	FA Cup	EFL Cup	EFL Trophy	Total
No.	Pos.	Nat.	Name	Apps	Apps	Apps	Apps	Apps
1	GK	(England)	Elliot Parish	11	1	3	1	16
2	DF	(England)	Matty Pearson	43	3	3	2	51
3	DF	(England)	Mark Hughes	36	4	2(1)	2	44 (1)
4	MF	(Wales)	Arron Davies	4	1 (1)	1 (1)	1 (1)	7 (3)
5	DF	(England)	Omar Beckles	40 (1)	4	3	0	47 (1)
7	MF	(England)	Jordan Clark	35 (6)	2 (2)	2	2	41 (8)
8	MF	(England)	Scott Brown	27 (1)	3	1	0	31 (1)
9	FW	(England)	Terry Gornell	11 (8)	1 (2)	1	1	14 (10)
10	FW	(Northern Ireland)	Shay McCartan	26 (8)	0 (2)	1 (1)	0 (1)	27 (12)
11	MF	(England)	Sean McConville	41	4	2	3	50
12	GK	(Slovakia)	Marek Rodák	20	1	0	0	21
13	GK	(England)	Jack Little	0	0	0	0	0
14	MF	(Benin)	Romuald Boco	12 (17)	2 (2)	0 (2)	0(2)	14 (23)
15	MF	(England)	Sean Clare	6 (2)	1	0	0	7 (2)
16	MF	(England)	Noor Husin	7 (4)	0	0	0	7 (4)
17	MF	(England)	Paddy Lacey	7 (4)	2	0 (1)	3	12 (5)
18	MF	(England)	Steven Hewitt	4 (5)	0 (1)	1 (1)	2	7 (7)
19	FW	(England)	Brayden Shaw	0 (2)	0	0	0	0 (2)
20	GK	(England)	Aaron Chapman	15	2	0 (1)	2	19 (1)
21	MF	(England)	Luke Wall	0	0	0	0 (1)	0 (1)
22	DF	(England)	Reagan Ogle	0 (1)	0	0	0 (1)	0 (2)
23	FW	(England)	Nathan Webb	0	0	0	0 (1)	0 (1)
24	FW	(England)	Jonathan Edwards	3 (6)	1	0	0	4 (6)
26	DF	(England)	Ross Sykes	0	0	0	3	3
28	MF	(Republic of Ireland)	Seamus Conneely	38	4	3	1	46
29	FW	(Northern Ireland)	Billy Kee	37 (2)	3	2	2	44 (2)
30	DF	(Saint Lucia)	Janoi Donacien	30 (5)	2	3	1	36 (5)
32	DF	(England)	Harvey Rodgers	19	1	0	0	20
Players who left the club in August/January transfer window or on loan
6	DF	(England)	Zak Vyner	16	0	1	0	17
12	DF	(England)	Callam Jones	0 (2)	0	0	2	2 (2)
15	DF	(Northern Ireland)	Rory McKeown	0	0	0	1	1
15	MF	(England)	Gary Taylor-Fletcher	0 (4)	0	0	2	2 (4)
16	MF	(France)	Bastien Héry	0 (1)	0	0	1	1 (1)
27	MF	(Republic of Ireland)	John O'Sullivan	18 (1)	2	3	1	24 (1)
33	MF	(England)	Chris Eagles	2 (4)	0	1 (1)	0(2)	3 (7)

=== Goalscorers ===
Includes all competitive matches.

As of match played 16:59, 6 May 2017 (UTC)

Rank	Pos.	No.	Player	League 2	FA Cup	EFL Cup	EFL Trophy	Total
1	FW	29	(Northern Ireland) Billy Kee	13	2	0	0	15
2	FW	10	(Northern Ireland) Shay McCartan	10	0	0	0	10
3	DF	2	(England) Matty Pearson	8	0	1	0	9
4	MF	14	(Benin) Romuald Boco	6	1	0	0	7
4	MF	11	(England) Sean McConville	6	1	0	0	7
6	FW	9	(England) Terry Gornell	2	0	0	2	4
7	DF	5	(England) Omar Beckles	2	1	0	0	3
7	MF	7	(England) Jordan Clark	1	1	0	1	3
9	MF	27	(Republic of Ireland) John O’Sullivan	1	1	0	0	2
9	DF	3	(England) Mark Hughes	2	0	0	0	2
11	MF	4	(Wales) Arron Davies	1	0	0	0	1
11	MF	15	(England) Sean Clare	1	0	0	0	1
11	FW	15	(England) Gary Taylor-Fletcher	0	0	0	1	1
11	MF	16	(England) Noor Husin	1	0	0	0	1
11	MF	17	(England) Paddy Lacey	1	0	0	0	1
11	FW	24	(England) Jonathan Edwards	1	0	0	0	1
11	DF	28	(Republic of Ireland) Seamus Conneely	1	0	0	0	1
11	DF	30	(Saint Lucia) Janoi Donacien	1	0	0	0	1
11	MF	32	(England) Harvey Rodgers	1	0	0	0	1
#	Own Goals			2	0	0	0	2
Total				61	7	1	4	73

=== Disciplinary record ===
As of matches played 17:58, 6 May 2017 (UTC)

No.	Pos.	Name	League Two		FA Cup		EFL Cup		EFL Trophy		Total	
No.	Pos.	Name	Yellow card	Red card	Yellow card	Red card	Yellow card	Red card	Yellow card	Red card	Yellow card	Red card
11	MF	Sean McConville	12	1	0	0	0	0	0	0	12	1
2	DF	Matty Pearson	9	1	0	0	1	0	1	0	11	1
30	DF	Janoi Donacien	9	0	0	0	2	0	0	0	11	0
10	FW	Shay McCartan	9	0	0	0	1	0	0	0	10	0
28	MF	Seamus Conneely	7	0	1	0	1	0	0	0	9	0
23	MF	Scott Brown	6	3	0	0	0	0	0	0	6	3
29	FW	Billy Kee	5	0	0	0	0	0	0	0	5	0
32	DF	Harvey Rodgers	4	0	1	0	0	0	0	0	5	0
3	DF	Mark Hughes	4	2	0	0	0	0	0	0	4	2
5	DF	Omar Beckles	3	1	0	0	0	0	0	0	3	1
9	FW	Terry Gornell	3	0	0	0	0	0	0	0	3	0
17	MF	Paddy Lacey	2	0	1	0	0	0	0	0	3	0
1	GK	Elliot Parish	2	0	0	0	0	1	0	0	2	1
6	DF	Zak Vyner	2	0	0	0	0	0	0	0	2	0
7	MF	Jordan Clark	2	0	0	0	0	0	0	0	2	0
15	MF	Sean Clare	1	0	1	0	0	0	0	0	2	0
18	MF	Steven Hewitt	0	0	0	0	0	0	2	0	2	0
27	MF	John O' Sullivan	2	0	0	0	0	0	0	0	2	0
14	MF	Romuald Boco	0	0	0	0	1	0	0	0	1	0
16	MF	Bastien Hery	1	0	0	0	0	0	0	0	1	0
16	MF	Noor Husin	1	0	0	0	0	0	0	0	1	0
33	MF	Chris Eagles	1	0	0	0	0	0	0	0	1	0
