= 2016–17 EFL Cup =

League Cup

Tournament details
- Country: England; Wales
- Dates: 9 August 2016 – 26 February 2017
- Teams: 92

Final positions
- Champions: Manchester United (5th title)
- Runners-up: Southampton

Tournament statistics
- Matches played: 93
- Goals scored: 287 (3.09 per match)
- Attendance: 1,461,722 (15,717 per match)
- Top goal scorer(s): Zlatan Ibrahimović; Daniel Sturridge (4 goals each)

The 2016–17 EFL Cup was the 57th season of the EFL Cup, formerly known as the Football League Cup, featuring all 92 clubs from the Premier League and the English Football League (EFL). The cup did not have a sponsor following the withdrawal of sponsorship from Capital One after four years as the Capital One Cup, but was renamed the EFL Cup after the Football League was rebranded as the English Football League.

The competition began on the week commencing 8 August 2016, and the final was played on 26 February 2017. Manchester United won their fifth title after a 3–2 victory over Southampton.

Manchester City were the defending champions, but were eliminated by local rivals and eventual winners Manchester United in the fourth round.

== Format ==
The League Cup is open to all 92 members of the Premier League and the English Football League and is divided into seven rounds, organised so that 32 clubs remain by the third round. Clubs involved in European competition during the season receive a bye to the third round, the remaining Premier League clubs enter at the second round, and the remaining Football League clubs enter at the first round.

The League Cup is played as a knockout cup competition with each tie, except semi-finals, being played as a single match with the winner advancing to the next round. The semi-finals are played over two legs, with each club playing one leg at home, and the club that scores more goals on aggregate over the two legs advances to the finals. If the score is level after 90 minutes, or if the aggregate score is level for semi-finals, then thirty minutes of extra time is played, divided into two fifteen-minute halves. If the aggregate scores in semi-finals are still level at the end of extra time the tie shall be decided by goals scored away from home counting twice, according to the away goals rule. If the tie is not decided during extra time, it is decided by a penalty shoot-out.

In the first five rounds, the club drawn first played at their home ground, and in the semi-finals the club drawn first played the first leg at home. The final was played at Wembley Stadium, a neutral ground.

== Club allocation ==
A total of 92 clubs from the top four English tiers (Premier League, EFL Championship, EFL League One and EFL League Two) participated in the 2016–17 EFL Cup.

=== Distribution ===
The tournament was organised so that 32 clubs remained by the third round. Seventy of the seventy-two clubs in the English Football League (tiers 2–4) entered in the first round. In the second round, the thirteen Premier League clubs not involved in European competition as well as the two highest-ranked Championship clubs relegated from 2015–16 Premier League (Newcastle United and Norwich City) entered the cup, with Arsenal, Leicester City, Manchester City, Manchester United, Southampton, Tottenham Hotspur and West Ham United all receiving a bye to the third round. In the third round the aforementioned clubs involved in European competition entered the competition.

- Clubs involved in European competition entered at the third round.
- The remaining Premier League clubs and two highest-ranked Championship clubs entered at the second round.
- The remaining English Football League clubs entered at the first round.

	Clubs entering in this round	Clubs advancing from previous round
First round (70 clubs)	24 clubs from EFL League Two; 24 clubs from EFL League One; 22 clubs from EFL Championship	N/A
Second round (50 clubs)	2 clubs from EFL Championship; 13 Premier League clubs (not involved in European competition)	35 winners from first round
Third round (32 clubs)	7 Premier League clubs (involved in European competition)	25 winners from second round
Fourth round (16 clubs)	No other entries	16 winners from third round
Quarter-finals (8 clubs)	No other entries	8 winners from fourth round
Semi-finals (4 clubs)	No other entries	4 winners from quarter-finals
Final (2 clubs)	No other entries	2 winners from semi-finals

== Round and draw dates ==
The schedule was as follows.

Round	Draw date	First leg	Second leg
First round	22 June 2016	9/10/11 August 2016	
Second round	10 August 2016	23/24 August 2016	
Third round	24 August 2016	20/21 September 2016	
Fourth round	21 September 2016	25/26 October 2016	
Quarter-finals	26 October 2016	29/30 November 2016	
Semi-finals	30 November 2016	10/11 January 2017	25/26 January 2017
Final	January 2017	26 February 2017	

== First round ==
=== Entry ===
A total of 70 clubs played in the first round: 24 from League Two (tier 4), 24 from League One (tier 3), and 22 from the Championship (tier 2). The draw for this round was split on a geographical basis into 'northern' and 'southern' sections. Teams were drawn against a team from the same section.

=== Matches ===
==== Northern section ====
9 August 2016	Accrington Stanley (4)	0–0 (a.e.t.) (11–10 p)	Bradford City (3)	Accrington
19:45		Report		Stadium: Crown Ground; Attendance: 1,936; Referee: David Webb
	Penalties
	Hughes (penalty missed); Clark (penalty scored); Hewitt (penalty scored); McCartan (penalty scored); Pearson (penalty scored); Conneely (penalty scored); Beckles (penalty scored); Donacien (penalty scored); O'Sullivan (penalty scored); Chapman (penalty scored); Hughes (penalty scored); Clark (penalty scored)		(penalty scored) McMahon; (penalty scored) Webb-Foster; (penalty scored) Hanson; (penalty scored) Morais; (penalty missed) Law; (penalty scored) Marshall; (penalty scored) Vincelot; (penalty scored) Knight-Percival; (penalty scored) Devine; (penalty scored) Doyle; (penalty scored) McMahon; (penalty missed) Webb-Foster

9 August 2016	Barnsley (2)	1–2 (a.e.t.)	Northampton Town (3)	Barnsley
19:45	Scowen 21'	Report	Davies 52' (o.g.); O'Toole 114'	Stadium: Oakwell; Attendance: 4,455; Referee: Carl Boyeson

9 August 2016	Blackpool (4)	4–2 (a.e.t.)	Bolton Wanderers (3)	Blackpool
19:45	Mellor 74'; Potts 78'; McAllister 109'; Herron 115'	Report	Proctor 45+2'; Woolery 90+5'	Stadium: Bloomfield Road; Attendance: 3,633; Referee: Darren Bond

9 August 2016	Cambridge United (4)	2–1 (a.e.t.)	Sheffield Wednesday (2)	Cambridge
19:45	Mingoia 90+1'; Berry 118'	Report	João 52'	Stadium: Abbey Stadium; Attendance: 4,170; Referee: Keith Stroud

9 August 2016	Carlisle United (4)	2–1	Port Vale (3)	Carlisle
19:45	Wyke 27'; S. Miller 41'	Report	Grant 51'	Stadium: Brunton Park; Attendance: 3,363; Referee: Mark Haywood

9 August 2016	Derby County (2)	1–0	Grimsby Town (4)	Derby
19:45	Keogh 60'	Report		Stadium: Pride Park Stadium; Attendance: 11,692; Referee: Ben Toner

9 August 2016	Doncaster Rovers (4)	1–2	Nottingham Forest (2)	Doncaster
19:45	Mandeville 69'	Report	Vaughan 11'; Ward 90+1'	Stadium: Keepmoat Stadium; Attendance: 5,160; Referee: Andy Haines

9 August 2016	Mansfield Town (4)	1–3	Blackburn Rovers (2)	Mansfield
19:45	M. Rose 48'	Report	Stokes 29', 55'; Duffy 54'	Stadium: Field Mill; Attendance: 2,885; Referee: Steve Martin

9 August 2016	Oldham Athletic (3)	2–1	Wigan Athletic (2)	Oldham
19:45	Flynn 18'; Law 83'	Report	Grigg 34'	Stadium: Boundary Park; Attendance: 2,554; Referee: Geoff Eltringham

9 August 2016	Preston North End (2)	1–0	Hartlepool United (4)	Preston
19:45	Doyle 90+4'	Report		Stadium: Deepdale; Attendance: 4,509; Referee: Andy Woolmer

9 August 2016	Rochdale (3)	3–1	Chesterfield (3)	Rochdale
19:45	Henderson 47'; Cannon 53'; Mendez-Laing 78'	Report	McGinn 30'	Stadium: Spotland Stadium; Attendance: 1,436; Referee: Nigel Miller

9 August 2016	Rotherham United (2)	4–5 (a.e.t.)	Morecambe (4)	Rotherham
19:45	Halford 59' (pen.); Yates 81', 120'; Forde 83'	Report	Stockton 6'; Dunn 68', 90+2' (pen.), 118'; Ellison 113'	Stadium: New York Stadium; Attendance: 3,793; Referee: Seb Stockbridge

9 August 2016	Scunthorpe United (3)	2–0 (a.e.t.)	Notts County (4)	Scunthorpe
19:45	Van Veen 100', 115'	Report		Stadium: Glanford Park; Attendance: 2,158; Referee: Scott Duncan

9 August 2016	Sheffield United (3)	1–2 (a.e.t.)	Crewe Alexandra (4)	Sheffield
19:45	Clarke 6'	Report	Lowe 89', 100'	Stadium: Bramall Lane; Attendance: 8,305; Referee: James Adcock

9 August 2016	Shrewsbury Town (3)	2–1	Huddersfield Town (2)	Shrewsbury
19:45	Leitch-Smith 1'; Dodds 77'	Report	Kachunga 39'	Stadium: New Meadow; Attendance: 2,862; Referee: Graham Salisbury

10 August 2016	Burton Albion (2)	3–2 (a.e.t.)	Bury (3)	Burton upon Trent
19:30	Reilly 36'; Beavon 105'; Butcher 113'	Report	Pope 48'; Maher 120'	Stadium: Pirelli Stadium; Attendance: 1,523; Referee: Mark Heywood

10 August 2016	Fleetwood Town (3)	2–2 (a.e.t.) (4–5 p)	Leeds United (2)	Fleetwood
19:45	Amadi-Holloway 13'; Hunter 111'	Report	Antonsson 89'; Wood 94' (pen.)	Stadium: Highbury Stadium; Attendance: 3,332; Referee: David Coote
	Penalties
	Grant (penalty scored); Ryan (penalty scored); McLaughlin (penalty scored); Hunter (penalty scored); Jónsson (penalty missed)		(penalty scored) Wood; (penalty scored) Antonsson; (penalty scored) Mowatt; (penalty scored) Phillips; (penalty scored) Hernández

==== Southern section ====
9 August 2016	Birmingham City (2)	0–1 (a.e.t.)	Oxford United (3)	Birmingham
19:45		Report	Sercombe 120'	Stadium: St Andrew's; Attendance: 7,202; Referee: Darren Handley

9 August 2016	Brighton & Hove Albion (2)	4–0	Colchester United (4)	Brighton
19:45	Baldock 64'; Murphy 70', 86'; Manu 74'	Report		Stadium: Falmer Stadium; Attendance: 6,895; Referee: James Linington

9 August 2016	Cheltenham Town (4)	1–0	Charlton Athletic (3)	Cheltenham
19:45	Pell 17'	Report		Stadium: Whaddon Road; Attendance: 2,106; Referee: Brendan Malone

9 August 2016	Coventry City (3)	3–2 (a.e.t.)	Portsmouth (4)	Coventry
19:45	Haynes 60'; Gadzhev 82'; Rose 106'	Report	Main 20' (pen.); Naismith 85'	Stadium: Ricoh Arena; Attendance: 4,976; Referee: Andrew Madley

9 August 2016	Exeter City (4)	1–0 (a.e.t.)	Brentford (2)	Exeter
19:45	Harley 100'	Report		Stadium: St James Park; Attendance: 2,633; Referee: Kevin Johnson

9 August 2016	Ipswich Town (2)	0–1	Stevenage (4)	Ipswich
19:45		Report	Kennedy 53'	Stadium: Portman Road; Attendance: 6,858; Referee: Charles Breakspear

9 August 2016	Leyton Orient (4)	2–3	Fulham (2)	Leyton, London
19:45	McCallum 73', 81'	Report	Adeniran 29'; Woodrow 51', 54'	Stadium: Brisbane Road; Attendance: 3,855; Referee: Andy Davies

9 August 2016	Newport County (4)	2–3	Milton Keynes Dons (3)	Newport
19:45	Jackson 31'; Randall 55' (pen.)	Report	Bowditch 63' (pen.), 90'; Tilney 70'	Stadium: Rodney Parade; Attendance: 1,402; Referee: Oliver Langford

9 August 2016	Peterborough United (3)	3–2	AFC Wimbledon (3)	Peterborough
19:45	Nichols 64', 90+3'; P. Taylor 68'	Report	Whelpdale 34'; Taylor 78'	Stadium: London Road Stadium; Attendance: 2,850; Referee: Ollie Yates

9 August 2016	Southend United (3)	1–3	Gillingham (3)	Southend-on-Sea
19:45	McLaughlin 34'	Report	McDonald 56'; Emmanuel-Thomas 74', 88'	Stadium: Roots Hall; Attendance: 2,816; Referee: Tim Robinson

9 August 2016	Walsall (3)	0–2 (a.e.t.)	Yeovil Town (4)	Walsall
19:45		Report	Campbell 103'; Dolan 111'	Stadium: Bescot Stadium; Attendance: 2,699; Referee: Robert Jones

9 August 2016	Wolverhampton Wanderers (2)	2–1	Crawley Town (4)	Wolverhampton
19:45	Mason 7'; Coady 76'	Report	Boldewijn 13'	Stadium: Molineux Stadium; Attendance: 8,252; Referee: Ross Joyce

9 August 2016	Wycombe Wanderers (4)	0–1	Bristol City (2)	High Wycombe
19:45		Report	Abraham 27'	Stadium: Adams Park; Attendance: 1,842; Referee: Lee Collins

9 August 2016	Barnet (4)	0–4	Millwall (3)	Edgware, London
20:00		Report	Akinde 23' (o.g.); O'Brien 35'; Morison 74'; Onyedinma 81' (pen.)	Stadium: The Hive Stadium; Attendance: 1,410; Referee: Dean Whitestone

9 August 2016	Reading (2)	2–0	Plymouth Argyle (4)	Reading
20:00	Van den Berg 16'; Beerens 28'	Report		Stadium: Madejski Stadium; Attendance: 6,979; Referee: Simon Hooper

10 August 2016	Luton Town (4)	3–1	Aston Villa (2)	Luton
19:45	Gray 35'; McGeehan 53'; Okore 66' (o.g.)	Report	Ayew 13'	Stadium: Kenilworth Road; Attendance: 7,412; Referee: Gavin Ward

10 August 2016	Queens Park Rangers (2)	2–2 (a.e.t.) (4–2 p)	Swindon Town (3)	White City, London
19:45	Ngbakoto 58'; Washington 93'	Report	Stewart 72'; Brophy 107'	Stadium: Loftus Road; Attendance: 5,440; Referee: Tony Harrington
	Penalties
	Chery (penalty scored); Polter (penalty scored); Washington (penalty scored); El Khayati (penalty scored)		(penalty missed) Rodgers; (penalty scored) Thomas; (penalty scored) Stewart; (penalty missed) Barry

11 August 2016	Bristol Rovers (3)	1–0 (a.e.t.)	Cardiff City (2)	Bristol
19:45	Lines 115'	Report		Stadium: Memorial Stadium; Attendance: 4,851; Referee: Chris Kavanagh

Note: The numbers in parentheses are the tier for the team during the 2016–17 season.

== Second round ==
=== Entry ===
A total of 50 clubs played in the second round: 15 that entered in this round and the 35 winners from the first round. The 15 clubs entering this round were the 13 clubs from the 2016–17 Premier League not involved in any European competition, plus the 18th and 19th placed teams from last season's Premier League. The draw for the second round was held on 10 August 2016

=== Matches ===
23 August 2016	Crystal Palace (1)	2–0	Blackpool (4)	Selhurst, London
19:30 BST	Dann 25'; Wickham 47'	Report		Stadium: Selhurst Park; Attendance: 7,533; Referee: Andrew Madley

23 August 2016	Blackburn Rovers (2)	4–3 (a.e.t.)	Crewe Alexandra (4)	Blackburn
19:45 BST	Akpan 42'; Wharton 69'; Conway 88'; Duffy 97'	Report	Bingham 8'; Dagnall 39', 90+3'	Stadium: Ewood Park; Attendance: 3,448; Referee: Geoff Eltringham

23 August 2016	Burton Albion (2)	0–5	Liverpool (1)	Burton upon Trent
19:45 BST		Report	Origi 15'; Firmino 22'; Naylor 61' (o.g.); Sturridge 78', 83'	Stadium: Pirelli Stadium; Attendance: 6,450; Referee: Simon Hooper

23 August 2016	Chelsea (1)	3–2	Bristol Rovers (3)	Fulham, London
19:45 BST	Batshuayi 29', 41'; Moses 31'	Report	Hartley 35'; Harrison 48' (pen.)	Stadium: Stamford Bridge; Attendance: 39,276; Referee: Keith Stroud

23 August 2016	Derby County (2)	1–1 (a.e.t.) (14–13 p)	Carlisle United (4)	Derby
19:45 BST	Bent 56'		Jones 90+5'	Stadium: Pride Park Stadium; Attendance: 9,860; Referee: Darren England
	Penalties
	Ince (penalty scored); Blackman (penalty scored); Butterfield (penalty scored); Hughes (penalty missed); Keogh (penalty scored); Elšnik (penalty scored); Baird (penalty scored); Pearce (penalty missed); Lowe (penalty scored); Carson (penalty scored); Ince (penalty scored); Blackman (penalty scored); Butterfield (penalty scored); Hughes (penalty scored); Keogh (penalty scored); Elšnik (penalty scored)		(penalty scored) Devitt; (penalty scored) Jones; (penalty scored) Joyce; (penalty missed) Wyke; (penalty scored) Grainger; (penalty scored) McKee; (penalty scored) Gillesphey; (penalty missed) Ibehre; (penalty scored) T. Miller; (penalty scored) Raynes; (penalty scored) Devitt; (penalty scored) Jones; (penalty scored) Joyce; (penalty scored) Wyke; (penalty scored) Grainger; (penalty missed) McKee

23 August 2016	Everton (1)	4–0	Yeovil Town (4)	Everton, Liverpool
19:45 BST	Lennon 28'; Barkley 69'; Koné 83', 90+1'	Report		Stadium: Goodison Park; Attendance: 24,617; Referee: Chris Kavanagh

23 August 2016	Exeter City (4)	1–3	Hull City (1)	Exeter
19:45 BST	Taylor 24'	Report	Diomande 26', 77'; Snodgrass 81'	Stadium: St James Park; Attendance: 4,037; Referee: Andy Woolmer

23 August 2016	Luton Town (4)	0–1	Leeds United (2)	Luton
19:45 BST		Report	Denton 23'	Stadium: Kenilworth Road; Attendance: 7,498; Referee: Kevin Johnson

23 August 2016	Millwall (3)	1–2	Nottingham Forest (2)	Bermondsey, London
19:45 BST	Williams 77'	Report	Paterson 35'; Veldwijk 87'	Stadium: The Den; Attendance: 4,009; Referee: Gavin Ward

23 August 2016	Newcastle United (2)	2–0	Cheltenham Town (4)	Newcastle upon Tyne
19:45 BST	Pérez 45+2', 47'	Report		Stadium: St. James' Park; Attendance: 21,972; Referee: Steve Martin

23 August 2016	Northampton Town (3)	2–2 (a.e.t.) (4–3 p)	West Bromwich Albion (1)	Northampton
19:45 BST	Diamond 36'; Revell 82'	Report	McClean 45'; McAuley 47'	Stadium: Sixfields Stadium; Attendance: 5,516; Referee: Darren Bond
	Penalties
	Hoskins (penalty scored); Taylor (penalty scored); O'Toole (penalty missed); Revell (penalty scored); Gorré (penalty scored)		(penalty scored) Rondón; (penalty missed) Berahino; (penalty scored) Fletcher; (penalty scored) Phillips; (penalty missed) Morrison

23 August 2016	Norwich City (2)	6–1	Coventry City (3)	Norwich
19:45 BST	Lafferty 25'; Canós 36', 80'; Martin 58'; Ja. Murphy 63'; Godfrey 86'	Report	Lameiras 56' (pen.)	Stadium: Carrow Road; Attendance: 10,510; Referee: David Webb

23 August 2016	Oxford United (3)	2–4	Brighton & Hove Albion (2)	Oxford
19:45 BST	Thomas 28'; Crowley 90+4'	Report	Adekugbe 2'; LuaLua 76'; Manu 81'; Hemed 85'	Stadium: Kassam Stadium; Attendance: 3,189; Referee: Andy Davies

23 August 2016	Peterborough United (3)	1–3	Swansea City (1)	Peterborough
19:45 BST	Da Silva Lopes 75'	Report	Fulton 15'; McBurnie 41', 44'	Stadium: London Road Stadium; Attendance: 4,727; Referee: James Adcock

23 August 2016	Preston North End (2)	2–0	Oldham Athletic (3)	Preston
19:45 BST	Doyle 66'; Hugill 81'	Report		Stadium: Deepdale; Attendance: 5,075; Referee: Scott Duncan

23 August 2016	Queens Park Rangers (2)	2–1	Rochdale (3)	London
19:45 BST	Sandro 41', 74'	Report	Lund 5'	Stadium: Loftus Road; Attendance: Dean Whitestone; Referee: 3,928

23 August 2016	Scunthorpe United (3)	1–2 (a.e.t.)	Bristol City (2)	Scunthorpe
19:45 BST	Morris 60' (pen.)	Report	Reid 35'; Abraham 97'	Stadium: Glanford Park; Attendance: 2,397; Referee: Ross Joyce

23 August 2016	Stevenage (4)	0–4	Stoke City (1)	Stevenage
19:45 BST		Report	Crouch 14', 48', 70'; Bardsley 32'	Stadium: Broadhall Way; Attendance: 3,363; Referee: Oliver Langford

23 August 2016	Watford (1)	1–2 (a.e.t.)	Gillingham (3)	Watford
19:45 BST	Ighalo 57'	Report	Byrne 82'; Dack 102'	Stadium: Vicarage Road; Attendance: 7,004; Referee: James Linington

23 August 2016	Wolverhampton Wanderers (2)	2–1	Cambridge United (4)	Wolverhampton
19:45 BST	Costa 6'; Wallace 13'	Report	Elito 14'	Stadium: Molineux; Attendance: 9,500; Referee: Brendan Malone

23 August 2016	Reading (2)	2–2 (a.e.t.) (4–2 p)	Milton Keynes Dons (3)	Reading
20:00 BST	Harriott 68', 114'	Report	Bowditch 34' (pen.); Tshimanga 118'	Stadium: Madejski Stadium; Attendance: 6,848; Referee: Charles Breakspear
	Penalties
	Williams (penalty scored); Evans (penalty scored); Quinn (penalty scored); Harriott (penalty missed); Obita (penalty scored)		(penalty scored) Upson; (penalty missed) Reeves; (penalty missed) Carruthers; (penalty scored) G. C. Williams

24 August 2016	Accrington Stanley (4)	1–0 (a.e.t.)	Burnley (1)	Accrington
19:45 BST	Pearson 120'	Report		Stadium: Wham Stadium; Attendance: 3,170; Referee: Tony Harrington

24 August 2016	Fulham (2)	2–1 (a.e.t.)	Middlesbrough (1)	Fulham, London
19:45 BST	De Sart 54' (o.g.); Christensen 113'	Report	Nugent 8'	Stadium: Craven Cottage; Attendance: 8,522; Referee: David Coote

24 August 2016	Morecambe (4)	1–2	Bournemouth (1)	Morecambe
19:45 BST	Stockton 14'	Report	Gradel 8'; M. Wilson 54'	Stadium: Globe Arena; Attendance: 2,542; Referee: Peter Bankes

24 August 2016	Sunderland (1)	1–0	Shrewsbury Town (3)	Sunderland
19:45 BST	Januzaj 83'	Report		Stadium: Stadium of Light; Attendance: 13,979; Referee: Jeremy Simpson

Note: The numbers in parentheses are the tier for the team during the 2016–17 season.

== Third round ==
=== Teams ===
A total of 32 teams played in the third round, seven that entered in this round and the 25 winners from the second round. The seven teams entering in this round were the clubs from the 2016–17 Premier League that are involved in European competition in the 2016–17 season. There was no seeding in this round.

=== Matches ===
20 September 2016	Bournemouth (1)	2–3 (a.e.t.)	Preston North End (2)	Bournemouth
19:45 BST	Grabban 53' (pen.); Gosling 76'	Report	Makienok 10', 85', 111'	Stadium: Dean Court; Attendance: 7,595; Referee: Simon Hooper

20 September 2016	Brighton & Hove Albion (2)	1–2	Reading (2)	Brighton
19:45 BST	Hemed 85'	Report	Quinn 32'; Swift 54'	Stadium: Falmer Stadium; Attendance: 6,235; Referee: Lee Probert

20 September 2016	Derby County (2)	0–3	Liverpool (1)	Derby
19:45 BST		Report	Klavan 24'; Coutinho 50'; Origi 54'	Stadium: Pride Park Stadium; Attendance: 26,245; Referee: Graham Scott

20 September 2016	Everton (1)	0–2	Norwich City (2)	Liverpool
19:45 BST		Report	Naismith 41'; Jo. Murphy 74'	Stadium: Goodison Park; Attendance: 29,550; Referee: Andrew Madley

20 September 2016	Leeds United (2)	1–0	Blackburn Rovers (2)	Leeds
19:45 BST	Wood 85'	Report		Stadium: Elland Road; Attendance: 8,488; Referee: Darren Deadman

20 September 2016	Leicester City (1)	2–4 (a.e.t.)	Chelsea (1)	Leicester
19:45 BST	Okazaki 17', 34'	Report	Cahill 45+2'; Azpilicueta 49'; Fàbregas 92', 94'	Stadium: King Power Stadium; Attendance: 29,899; Referee: Robert Madley

20 September 2016	Newcastle United (2)	2–0	Wolverhampton Wanderers (2)	Newcastle upon Tyne
19:45 BST	Ritchie 29'; Gouffran 31'	Report		Stadium: St James' Park; Attendance: 34,735; Referee: Andy Woolmer

20 September 2016	Nottingham Forest (2)	0–4	Arsenal (1)	Nottingham
19:45 BST		Report	Xhaka 23'; Pérez 60' (pen.), 71'; Oxlade-Chamberlain 90+4'	Stadium: City Ground; Attendance: 28,567; Referee: Paul Tierney

21 September 2016	Fulham (2)	1–2	Bristol City (2)	Fulham, London
19:45 BST	Piazon 14'	Report	Wilbraham 45'; Abraham 90'	Stadium: Craven Cottage; Attendance: 6,017; Referee: Andy Davies

21 September 2016	Northampton Town (3)	1–3	Manchester United (1)	Northampton
19:45 BST	Revell 42' (pen.)	Report	Carrick 17'; Herrera 68'; Rashford 75'	Stadium: Sixfields Stadium; Attendance: 7,798; Referee: Stuart Attwell

21 September 2016	Queens Park Rangers (2)	1–2	Sunderland (1)	White City, London
19:45 BST	Sandro 60'	Report	McNair 70', 80'	Stadium: Loftus Road; Attendance: 14,301; Referee: Peter Bankes

21 September 2016	Southampton (1)	2–0	Crystal Palace (1)	Southampton
19:45 BST	Austin 33' (pen.); Hesketh 63'	Report		Stadium: St Mary's Stadium; Attendance: 14,080; Referee: James Adcock

21 September 2016	Swansea City (1)	1–2	Manchester City (1)	Swansea
19:45 BST	Sigurðsson 90+3'	Report	Clichy 49'; García 67'	Stadium: Liberty Stadium; Attendance: 18,237; Referee: Keith Stroud

21 September 2016	West Ham United (1)	1–0	Accrington Stanley (4)	Stratford, London
19:45 BST	Payet 90+6'	Report		Stadium: Olympic Stadium; Attendance: 39,877; Referee: Steve Martin

21 September 2016	Stoke City (1)	1–2	Hull City (1)	Stoke-on-Trent
20:00 BST	Arnautović 24'	Report	Mason 45'; Henriksen 90+1'	Stadium: Bet365 Stadium; Attendance: 10,550; Referee: Chris Kavanagh

21 September 2016	Tottenham Hotspur (1)	5–0	Gillingham (3)	Tottenham, London
20:00 BST	Eriksen 31', 48'; Janssen 51' (pen.); Onomah 65'; Lamela 68'	Report		Stadium: White Hart Lane; Attendance: 26,244; Referee: David Coote

Note: The numbers in parentheses are the tier for the team during the 2016–17 season.

== Fourth round ==
=== Teams ===
A total of 16 clubs played in the fourth round, all winners of the third round. There was no seeding in this round. The draw was held on 21 September 2016.

=== Matches ===
25 October 2016	Arsenal (1)	2–0	Reading (2)	Holloway, London
19:45 BST	Oxlade-Chamberlain 33', 78'	Report		Stadium: Emirates Stadium; Attendance: 59,865; Referee: Graham Scott

25 October 2016	Bristol City (2)	1–2	Hull City (1)	Bristol
19:45 BST	Tomlin 90+3'	Report	Maguire 44'; Dawson 47'	Stadium: Ashton Gate; Attendance: 16,149; Referee: Keith Stroud

25 October 2016	Leeds United (2)	2–2 (a.e.t.) (3–2 p)	Norwich City (2)	Leeds
19:45 BST	Antonsson 43'; Wood 109'	Report	Pritchard 14'; Oliveira 99'	Stadium: Elland Road; Attendance: 22,222; Referee: Andy Woolmer
	Penalties
	Wood (penalty scored); Roofe (penalty scored); Phillips (penalty missed); Grimes (penalty missed); Vieira (penalty scored)		(penalty scored) Dorrans; (penalty missed) Pritchard; (penalty missed) Naismith; (penalty scored) Oliveira; (penalty missed) Brady

25 October 2016	Liverpool (1)	2–1	Tottenham Hotspur (1)	Liverpool
19:45 BST	Sturridge 9', 64'	Report	Janssen 76' (pen.)	Stadium: Anfield; Attendance: 53,051; Referee: Jon Moss

25 October 2016	Newcastle United (2)	6–0	Preston North End (2)	Newcastle upon Tyne
19:45 BST	Mitrović 19', 55'; Diamé 38', 87'; Ritchie 53' (pen.); Pérez 90+1'	Report		Stadium: St James' Park; Attendance: 49,042; Referee: Andrew Madley

26 October 2016	Southampton (1)	1–0	Sunderland (1)	Southampton
19:45 BST	Boufal 66'	Report		Stadium: St Mary's Stadium; Attendance: 21,460; Referee: Chris Kavanagh

26 October 2016	West Ham United (1)	2–1	Chelsea (1)	Stratford, London
19:45 BST	Kouyaté 11'; Fernandes 48'	Report	Cahill 90+4'	Stadium: Olympic Stadium; Attendance: 45,957; Referee: Craig Pawson

26 October 2016	Manchester United (1)	1–0	Manchester City (1)	Old Trafford, Manchester
20:00 BST	Mata 54'	Report		Stadium: Old Trafford; Attendance: 74,196; Referee: Mike Dean

Note: The numbers in parentheses are the tier for the team during the 2016–17 season.

== Quarter-finals ==
=== Teams ===
A total of eight clubs played in the quarter-finals, all winners of the fourth round. There was no seeding in this round and the draw was held on 26 October following the conclusion of the tie between Manchester United and Manchester City in the previous round.

=== Matches ===
29 November 2016	Hull City (1)	1–1 (a.e.t.) (3–1 p)	Newcastle United (2)	Kingston upon Hull
19:45 GMT	Snodgrass 99'	Report	Diamé 98'	Stadium: KCOM Stadium; Attendance: 16,243; Referee: Neil Swarbrick
	Penalties
	Snodgrass (penalty scored); Dawson (penalty scored); Huddlestone (penalty scored)		(penalty missed) Shelvey; (penalty missed) Gayle; (penalty scored) Atsu; (penalty missed) Gouffran

29 November 2016	Liverpool (1)	2–0	Leeds United (2)	Liverpool
19:45 GMT	Origi 76'; Woodburn 81'	Report		Stadium: Anfield; Attendance: 52,012; Referee: Andre Marriner

30 November 2016	Arsenal (1)	0–2	Southampton (1)	Holloway, London
19:45 GMT		Report	Clasie 13'; Bertrand 38'	Stadium: Emirates Stadium; Attendance: 59,013; Referee: Kevin Friend

30 November 2016	Manchester United (1)	4–1	West Ham United (1)	Old Trafford, Manchester
20:00 GMT	Ibrahimović 2', 90+3'; Martial 48', 62'	Report	Fletcher 35'	Stadium: Old Trafford; Attendance: 65,269; Referee: Mike Jones

Note: The numbers in parentheses are the tier for the team during the 2016–17 season.

== Semi-finals ==
=== Teams ===
A total of four clubs played in the semi-finals, all winners of the quarter-finals. There was no seeding in this round and the draw was held on 30 November.

=== Matches ===
The semi-finals were played over two legs, with each team playing one leg at home, and the team that scored more goals on aggregate over the two legs advancing to the final.

==== First leg ====
The first leg matches were played in the week commencing 9 January 2017.

10 January 2017	Manchester United (1)	2–0	Hull City (1)	Old Trafford, Manchester
20:00 GMT	Mata 56'; Fellaini 87'	Report		Stadium: Old Trafford; Attendance: 65,798; Referee: Kevin Friend

11 January 2017	Southampton (1)	1–0	Liverpool (1)	Southampton
19:45 GMT	Redmond 20'	Report		Stadium: St Mary's Stadium; Attendance: 31,480; Referee: Neil Swarbrick

==== Second leg ====
The second leg matches were played on 25 and 26 January 2017.

25 January 2017	Liverpool (1)	0–1 (0–2 agg.)	Southampton (1)	Liverpool
20:00 GMT		Report	Long 90+1'	Stadium: Anfield; Attendance: 52,238; Referee: Martin Atkinson

26 January 2017	Hull City (1)	2–1 (2–3 agg.)	Manchester United (1)	Kingston upon Hull
19:45 GMT	Huddlestone 35' (pen.); Niasse 85'	Report	Pogba 66'	Stadium: KCOM Stadium; Attendance: 16,831; Referee: Jon Moss

Note: The numbers in parentheses are the tier for the team during the 2016–17 season.

== Final ==
The final was held on 26 February 2017 at Wembley Stadium.

26 February 2017
16:30 GMT

Manchester United	3–2	Southampton
Ibrahimović 19', 87'; Lingard 38'	Report	Gabbiadini 45+1', 48'

Wembley Stadium, London
Attendance: 85,264
Referee: Andre Marriner (West Midlands)

== Top goalscorers ==
Rank	Player	Club	Goals
1	(Sweden) Zlatan Ibrahimović	Manchester United	4
1	(England) Daniel Sturridge	Liverpool	4
3	(England) Tammy Abraham	Bristol City	3
3	(England) Dean Bowditch	Milton Keynes Dons	3
3	(England) Peter Crouch	Stoke City	3
3	(Senegal) Mohamed Diamé	Newcastle United	3
3	(England) Jack Dunn	Morecambe	3
3	(Denmark) Simon Makienok	Preston North End	3
3	(Belgium) Divock Origi	Liverpool	3
3	(England) Alex Oxlade-Chamberlain	Arsenal	3
3	(Spain) Ayoze Pérez	Newcastle United	3
3	(Brazil) Sandro	Queens Park Rangers	3
3	(New Zealand) Chris Wood	Leeds United	3
