= Cullingford =

Cullingford is a surname. Notable people with the surname include:

- Elizabeth Cullingford (fl. 1981), American scholar of literature
- Bob Cullingford (born 1953), English footballer
