= Nathan Webb (footballer) =

English footballer (born 1998)

Personal information
- Full name: Nathan James Webb
- Date of birth: 9 July 1998 (age 28)
- Place of birth: Ashton-under-Lyne, England
- Position: Forward

Youth career
- –2012: Glossop North End
- 2012–2016: Accrington Stanley

Senior career*
Years	Team	Apps	(Gls)
2016–2017	Accrington Stanley	0	(0)
2016	→ Nelson (loan)	10	(2)
2017	→ Ramsbottom United (loan)	4	(1)
2017–	Ramsbottom United		
- * Club domestic league appearances and goals as of 23:40, 16 March 2017 (UTC)

Nathan James Webb (born 9 July 1998) is an English professional footballer who plays as a forward for League Two club Accrington Stanley.

== Career ==
Webb was born in Ashton-under-Lyne, Greater Manchester, and started his career playing youth football for his local side Glossop North End. He was spotted at under-15 level by scouts from League Two side Accrington Stanley and also by Sheffield Wednesday however joined Accrington Stanley in 2012 in their youth system. He was part of the squad for the two FA Youth Cup runs that saw Accrington reach the fifth round stage against Reading in 2014, and third-round stage against Crystal Palace in 2016. In March 2016, during the second year of his scholarship, he joined North West Counties Football League Premier Division side Nelson on loan until the end of the season having impressed for the under-18 side, scoring sixteen goals in the 2015–16 season. He made a total of ten appearances for the Admirals, scoring twice against local rivals Barnoldswick Town and Maine Road. In May 2016 upon his loan return, he signed his first professional contract with the Accrington on a one-year deal. In August 2016, he made his professional debut in an EFL Trophy group-stage match against Crewe Alexandra. He came on as a substitute for Sean McConville in the second half in a 3–0 defeat. In February 2017, he joined Northern Premier League Division One North side Ramsbottom United on loan. He scored on his debut for the club in a 4–0 win over Ossett Albion. In June 2017, following his release from Accrington, he re-joined Ramsbottom United on a permanent deal linking up again with manager Mark Fell, who had managed him during his loan spell at Nelson.

== Career statistics ==
As of match played on 30 August 2016

Appearances and goals by club, season and competition
Club	Season	League			FA Cup		League Cup		Other		Total	
Club	Season	Division	Apps	Goals	Apps	Goals	Apps	Goals	Apps	Goals	Apps	Goals
Accrington Stanley	2015–16	League Two	0	0	0	0	0	0	0	0	0	0
Accrington Stanley	2016–17	League Two	0	0	0	0	0	0	1 (Note: Appearance in EFL Trophy)	0	1	0
Accrington Stanley	Total		0	0	0	0	0	0	1	0	1	0
Nelson (loan)	2015–16	NWCFL Premier Division	10	2	—		—		—		10	2
Ramsbottom United (loan)	2016–17	NPL Division One North	4	1	—		—		—		4	1
Career total			14	3	0	0	0	0	1	0	15	3
