= 2015–16 Accrington Stanley F.C. season =

Accrington Stanley F.C.
2015–16 season
- Chairman: Peter Marsden
- Manager: John Coleman
- Stadium: Crown Ground
- League Two: 4th (qualification for League 2 Play-offs)
- FA Cup: Second round (eliminated by Portsmouth)
- League Cup: First round (eliminated by Hull City)
- League Trophy: First round (eliminated by Bury)
- Top goalscorer: League: Billy Kee (17); All: Billy Kee (17)
- Highest home attendance: 4,694 for 2nd leg of League 2 playoff semi-final against AFC Wimbledon
- Lowest home attendance: 1,073 on 18 August 2015 against Mansfield Town
Home colours	Away colours

The 2015–16 season was Accrington Stanley's tenth consecutive season in League Two and their 47th year in existence. Along with competing in League Two, the club also participated in the FA Cup, League Cup and League Trophy. The season covers the period from 1 July 2015 to 30 June 2016.

== Transfers ==
=== Transfers in ===
Date from	Position	Nationality	Name	From	Fee	Ref.
1 July 2015	DF	ENG	Tom Davies	Fleetwood Town	Free transfer	
1 July 2015	GK	ENG	Ross Etheridge	Derby County	Free transfer	
1 July 2015	FW	NIR	Billy Kee	Scunthorpe United	Free transfer	
1 July 2015	MF	ENG	Sean McConville	Chester	Undisclosed	
1 July 2015	GK	NIR	Jason Mooney	York City	Free transfer	
1 July 2015	FW	ENG	Adam Morgan	Yeovil Town	Free transfer	
1 July 2015	MF	ENG	Matty Pearson	FC Halifax Town	Free transfer	
3 July 2015	MF	ENG	Anthony Barry	Forest Green Rovers	Free transfer	
7 August 2015	DF	ENG	Liam Wakefield	Doncaster Rovers	Free transfer	
14 August 2015	MF	ENG	Jack Phillips	Prescot Cables	Free transfer	
8 October 2015	FW	WAL	Kaid Mohamed	unattached	Free transfer	
15 January 2016	MF	ENG	Brayden Shaw	Bury	Free transfer	
27 January 2016	MF	ENG	Scott Brown	Grimsby Town	Free transfer	
29 January 2016	DF	ENG	Mark Hughes	Stevenage	Free transfer	
30 January 2016	MF	BEN	Romuald Boco	Portsmouth	Free transfer	

=== Transfers out ===
Date from	Position	Nationality	Name	To	Fee	Ref.
1 July 2015	DF	ENG	Rob Atkinson	Guiseley (Note: Following Atkinson's release he joined Guiseley.)	Released	
1 July 2015	FW	ENG	George Bowerman	Altrincham (Note: Following Bowerman's release he joined Altrincham.)	Released	
1 July 2015	FW	NIR	James Gray	Wrexham (Note: Following Gray's release he joined Wrexham.)	Free transfer	
1 July 2015	DF	ENG	Nicky Hunt	Mansfield Town (Note: Following Hunt's release he joined Mansfield Town.)	Free transfer	
1 July 2015	FW	ENG	James Jenkins	Free agent	Released	
1 July 2015	MF	ENG	Luke Joyce	Carlisle United	Free transfer	
1 July 2015	DF	IRL	Michael Liddle	Free Agent	Released	
1 July 2015	FW	SCO	Kal Naismith	Portsmouth	Undisclosed	
1 July 2015	GK	TRI	Tony Warner	Retired	—N/a	
1 July 2015	MF	ENG	Danny Whitehead	Macclesfield Town (Note: Following Whitehead's release he joined Macclesfield Town.)	Free transfer	

=== Loans in ===
Date from	Position	Nationality	Name	From	Date until	Ref.
9 July 2015	DF	WAL	Joe Wright	Huddersfield Town	2 January 2016	
20 October 2015	DF	ENG	Brad Halliday	Middlesbrough	20 November 2015	
24 March 2016	FW	NIR	Andrew Little	Preston North End	End of season	
24 March 2016	MF	GHA	Tarique Fosu	Reading	End of season	

=== Loans out ===
Date from	Position	Nationality	Name	To	Date until	Ref.
11 September 2015	FW	ENG	Max Hazeldine	Stockport County	9 October 2015	
22 September 2015	MF	ENG	Kealan Steenson	Clitheroe	24 October 2015	

== Pre-season friendlies ==
On 15 May 2015, Accrington Stanley announced their first pre-season friendly against Blackburn Rovers. On 19 May 2015, Accrington Stanley announced they will visit Nelson as part of their pre-season schedule. On 24 May 2015, it was announced Accrington Stanley would visit Colne on 8 July 2015 as part of their pre-season preparations. On 28 May 2015, the club announced their fourth pre-season friendly against AFC Darwen. A day later the club announced Rochdale will visit on 28 July 2015. On 30 May 2015, Accrington Stanley announced they will face Marine on 25 July 2015. A friendly against Burnley was announced on 12 June 2015. On 25 June 2015, Accrington Stanley added a home friendly against Blackpool for pre-season. On 4 July 2015, Stanley announced a pre-season fixture against Scarborough Athletic.

== Match details ==
=== Football League Two ===
Football League Two match details
Date	League position	Opponents	Venue	Result	Score F–A	Scorers	Attendance	Ref
8 August 2015	10th	Luton Town	H	D	1–1	Windass 61' pen.	2,359	
15 August 2015	18th	Morecambe	A	L	0–1		1,865	
18 August 2015	12th	Mansfield Town	H	W	1–0	McConville 33'	1,073	
22 August 2015	13th	Notts County	A	D	1–1	Crooks 90'	3,825	
29 August 2015	15th	Northampton Town	H	D	1–1	Windass 55' pen.	1,526	
5 September 2015	15th	Portsmouth	A	D	0–0		15,745	
12 September 2015	10th	Bristol Rovers	A	W	1–0	Kee 68'	6,351	
19 September 2015	6th	Exeter City	H	W	4–2	Windass (2) 33', 34', Mingoia 61', Kee 63'	1,403	
26 September 2015	5th	Crawley Town	A	W	3–0	Windass 45' pen., Crooks 45+3', Kee 89'	1,659	
29 September 2015	4th	Yeovil Town	H	W	2–1	Windass 8', Crooks 54'	1,309	
3 October 2015	7th	Oxford United	H	L	1–3	Crooks 70'	1,755	
10 October 2015	5th	Barnet	A	W	2–1	Togwell 23' o.g., McConville 62'	2,229	
17 October 2015	6th	Plymouth Argyle	A	L	0–1		7,865	
20 October 2015	8th	AFC Wimbledon	H	L	3–4	Kee (2) 5', 10', McConville 36'	1,315	
24 October 2015	7th	Dagenham & Redbridge	H	W	3–1	Conneely 2', Pearson 45+3', Windass 49'	1,104	
31 October 2015	4th	Leyton Orient	A	W	1–0	Windass 25'	4,701	
14 November 2015	4th	Newport County	H	D	2–2	Kee 58', Crooks 77'	1,552	
21 November 2015	4th	Cambridge United	A	W	3–2	McConville 29', Davies 48', Windass 53' pen.	5,107	
28 November 2015	4th	York City	A	W	5–1	Pearson 15', Kee (2) 33', 72', Windass 61' pen., McCartan 88'	2,825	
19 December 2015	6th	Stevenage	A	D	1–1	Kee 85' pen.	2,818	
28 December 2015	8th	Northampton Town	A	L	0–1		5,269	
2 January 2016	7th	Mansfield Town	A	W	3–2	Mingoia 4', Kee 72', Gornell 85'	3,271	
19 January 2016	6th	Hartlepool United	H	W	3–1	Buxton 23', McCartan (2) 45+1', 58'	1,211	
23 January 2016	6th	Exeter City	A	L	1–2	McCartan 3'	3,669	
30 January 2016	5th	Bristol Rovers	H	W	1–0	McConville 69'	2,027	
6 February 2016	8th	Carlisle United	A	L	0–2		4,709	
13 February 2016	6th	Crawley Town	H	W	4–1	Kee 48', Pearson 73', Conneely 87', Mingoia 90+1'	1,374	
16 February 2016	4th	Carlisle United	H	D	1–1	Gornell 58'	2,080	
20 February 2016	4th	Oxford United	A	W	2–1	Kee 46', Brown 88'	6,792	
23 February 2016	4th	Notts County	H	W	3–2	Kee 14', Boco (2) 21', 51'	1,215	
27 February 2016	4th	Barnet	H	D	2–2	Kee 57', Crooks 74'	1,416	
1 March 2016	4th	Yeovil Town	A	L	0–1		3,207	
5 March 2016	4th	AFC Wimbledon	A	D	0–0		3,627	
8 March 2016	6th	Portsmouth	H	L	1–3	McCartan 83'	1,841	
12 March 2016	5th	Plymouth Argyle	H	W	2–1	Kee 85' pen., McCartan 90+3'	2,044	
16 March 2016	5th	Wycombe Wanderers	H	D	1–1	McCartan 45+2'	1,403	
19 March 2016	5th	Dagenham & Redbridge	A	W	1–0	Kee 83'	1,345	
25 March 2016	5th	Leyton Orient	H	W	1–0	Brown 51'	2,783	
28 March 2016	4th	Newport County	A	W	2–0	Kee 35', Windass 37'	2,218	
2 April 2016	4th	Cambridge United	H	D	1–1	Fosu 77'	2,185	
9 April 2016	3rd	Luton Town	A	W	2–0	Brown 47', Gornell 84'	7,467	
16 April 2016	4th	Morecambe	H	D	2–2	Windass (2) 21', 48' pen.	2,609	
19 April 2016	2nd	Hartlepool United	A	W	2–1	Conneelly 3', Fosu 45+1'	3,445	
23 April 2016	2nd	York City	H	W	3–0	Fosu 35', Windass (2) 69', 90+2'	2,222	
30 April 2016	2nd	Wycombe Wanderers	A	W	1–0	Hughes 78'	4,041	
7 May 2016	4th	Stevenage	H	D	0–0		4,386	

==== League table ====
Pos	Team	Pld	W	D	L	GF	GA	GD	Pts	Promotion, qualification or relegation
2	Oxford United (P)	46	24	14	8	84	41	+43	86	Promotion to EFL League One
3	Bristol Rovers (P)	46	26	7	13	77	46	+31	85	Promotion to EFL League One
4	Accrington Stanley	46	24	13	9	74	48	+26	85	Qualification for League Two play-offs (Note: Four teams play for one spot and promotion to Football League One.)
5	Plymouth Argyle	46	24	9	13	72	46	+26	81	Qualification for League Two play-offs
6	Portsmouth	46	21	15	10	75	44	+31	78	Qualification for League Two play-offs

Updated to match(es) played on 7 May 2016. Source: BBC Sport
Rules for classification: 1) Points; 2) Goal difference; 3) Number of goals scored
(P) Promoted

=== Football League Two play-offs ===
Play-off match details
Round	Date	Opponents	Venue	Result	Score F–A	Scorers	Attendance	Ref
Semi-final 1st leg	14 May 2016	AFC Wimbledon	A	L	0–1		4,870	
Semi-final 2nd leg	18 May 2016	AFC Wimbledon	H	D	2–2	Windass 39', Mingoia 59'	4,694	

=== FA Cup ===
FA Cup match details
Round	Date	Opponents	Venue	Result	Score F–A	Scorers	Attendance	Ref
First round	7 November 2015	York City	H	W	3–2	McConville 29', Crooks 36', Windass 48' pen.	1,475	
Second round	5 December 2015	Portsmouth	A	L	0–1		9,258	

=== League Cup ===
League Cup match details
Round	Date	Opponents	Venue	Result	Score F–A	Scorers	Attendance	Ref
First round	11 August 2015	Hull City	H	D	2–2 (a.e.t.); 3–4 pens.	Crooks 105', Gornell 115'	2,118	

=== Football League Trophy ===
Football League Trophy match details
Round	Date	Opponents	Venue	Result	Score F–A	Scorers	Attendance	Ref
First round	1 September 2015	Bury	H	L	1–2	Bruna 83'	1,344	

== Appearances and goals ==
Numbers in parentheses denote appearances as substitute.
Players with names struck through and marked † left the club during the playing season.
Players with names in italics and marked * were on loan from another club with Accrington Stanley.
Players listed with no appearances have been in the matchday squad but only as unused substitutes.
Key to positions: GK – Goalkeeper; DF – Defender; MF – Midfielder; FW – Forward

Players contracted for the 2015–16 season
No.	Pos.	Nat.	Name	League		FA Cup		League Cup		FL Trophy		Total		Discipline	
No.	Pos.	Nat.	Name	Apps	Goals	Apps	Goals	Apps	Goals	Apps	Goals	Apps	Goals	A yellow rectangle, denoting the yellow penalty card shown to a player being cautioned	A red rectangle, denoting the red penalty card shown to a player being sent off
1	GK	ENG	Ross Etheridge	19	0	0	0	0	0	1	0	20	0	0	1
2	DF	ENG	Matty Pearson	44	3	2	0	1	0	1	0	48	3	9	0
3	DF	ENG	Dean Winnard	14 (1)	0	0	0	1	0	1	0	16 (1)	0	5	0
4	MF	ENG	Anthony Barry	2 (6)	0	1	0	1	0	1	0	5 (6)	0	0	0
5	DF	ENG	Tom Davies	29 (1)	1	2	0	1	0	1	0	33 (1)	1	8	1
6	MF	ENG	Andrew Procter	1 (10)	0	0	0	0	0	0 (1)	0	1 (11)	0	1	0
7	MF	ENG ITA	Piero Mingoia	44	3	2	0	1	0	1	0	48	3	2	0
8	MF	ENG	Josh Windass	28	15	2	1	1	0	0	0	31	16	3	0
9	FW	ENG	~~Adam Morgan~~ †	0 (2)	0	0	0	0	0	1	0	1 (2)	0	0	0
9	FW	NIR	Andy Little *	0	0	0	0	0	0	0	0	0	0	0	0
10	FW	ENG	Terry Gornell	8 (11)	3	0 (2)	0	0 (1)	1	0	0	8 (14)	4	3	0
11	MF	ENG	Sean McConville	40 (2)	5	2	0	0 (1)	0	1	0	43 (3)	5	4	0
12	MF	ENG	Liam Wakefield	7 (5)	0	0	0	1	0	1	0	9 (5)	0	1	0
14	MF	ENG	Matt Crooks	32	6	2	1	1	1	0	0	35	8	12	0
15	DF	WAL	Joe Wright *	19 (1)	0	2	0	0	0	0	0	21 (1)	0	3	0
16	DF	ENG	Keenan Quansah	0	0	0	0	0	0	0	0	0	0	0	0
17	FW	NIR	Shay McCartan	10 (15)	7	0 (1)	0	0	0	0	0	10 (16)	7	2	1
18	MF	ENG	~~Jack Phillips~~ †	0	0	0	0	0	0	0 (1)	0	0 (1)	0	0	0
18	MF	ENG	Scott Brown	8 (4)	3	0	0	0	0	0	0	8 (4)	3	0	0
19	FW	ENG	Marcus Carver	0 (2)	0	0	0	0	0	0	0	0 (2)	0	0	0
20	MF	ENG	Max Hazeldine	0	0	0	0	0	0	0	0	0	0	0	0
21	MF	ARG	~~Gerardo Bruna~~ †	0 (3)	0	0	0	1	0	0 (1)	1	1 (4)	1	0	0
22	DF	ENG	Adam Buxton	23 (4)	1	0	0	0	0	0	0	23 (4)	1	5	1
23	MF	ENG	Kealan Steenson	0	0	0	0	0	0	0	0	0	0	0	0
24	DF	ENG	Mark Hughes	13	0	0	0	0	0	0	0	13	0	2	0
25	DF	ENG	Liam Goulding	0	0	0	0	0	0	0	0	0	0	0	0
26	MF	BEN	Romuald Boco	6 (5)	2	0	0	0	0	0	0	6 (5)	2	0	0
28	DF	IRL	Seamus Conneely	44	3	1	0	0 (1)	0	1	0	46 (1)	3	4	0
29	FW	ENG	Billy Kee	37 (6)	17	2	0	1	0	1	0	41 (6)	17	6	0
30	MF	ENG	Tarique Fosu *	2 (4)	3	0	0	0	0	0	0	2 (4)	3	1	0
33	GK	NIR	Jason Mooney	25 (1)	0	2	0	1	0	0	0	28 (1)	0	4	1
34	DF	ENG	Brad Halliday *	29 (1)	0	2	0	0	0	0	0	31 (1)	0	5	0
39	FW	WAL	~~Kaid Mohamed~~ †	0 (3)	0	0	0	0	0	0	0	0 (3)	0	0	0
39	FW	ENG	Brayden Shaw	0 (4)	0	0	0	0	0	0	0	0 (4)	0	1	0
