= Jack Phillips (footballer, born 1993) =

English footballer

Personal information
- Full name: Jack Phillips
- Date of birth: 15 October 1993 (age 33)
- Place of birth: Liverpool, England
- Position: Midfielder

Youth career
- –2010: Blackburn Rovers
- 2010–2012: Wigan Athletic

Senior career*
Years	Team	Apps	(Gls)
2012–2014	Wigan Athletic	0	(0)
2014–2015	Prescot Cables	37	(11)
2015–2016	Accrington Stanley	0	(0)
2015	→ Skelmersdale United (loan)	5	(0)
Total		42	(11)
- * Club domestic league appearances and goals

Jack Phillips (born 15 October 1993) is an English former professional footballer who played as a midfielder.

== Career ==
Born in Liverpool, Phillips attended the Cardinal Heenan Catholic High School in the city and started his career in the youth team at Blackburn Rovers, before joining Premier League side Wigan Athletic on a two-year scholarship in 2010. In the summer of 2012 after completing his scholarship, he signed a two-year professional contract with the club. He featured predominantly in the reserve side and was released in the summer of 2014, after spending four years at the club without making a first team appearance. Following his release from professional football, he started a Sports Science Degree at Liverpool John Moores University combining this with playing for non-league side Prescot Cables of the Northern Premier League Division One North. He impressed in his first year with Prescot, winning the Manager's and Supporters Player of the Year Awards, also finishing as top goalscorer with eleven goals as the side struggled towards the bottom of the table.

In August 2015, he signed for Football League Two side Accrington Stanley on a short-term contract after impressing on trial during pre-season. He linked up with manager John Coleman, who was his former Primary School teacher at St Aloysius in Liverpool. He made his professional debut in September 2015, featuring as a substitute for Adam Morgan in the 2–1 defeat to Bury in the Football League Trophy.

== Career statistics ==
As of match played 1 September 2015.

Appearances and goals by club, season and competition
Club	Season	League			FA Cup		League Cup		Other		Total	
Club	Season	Division	Apps	Goals	Apps	Goals	Apps	Goals	Apps	Goals	Apps	Goals
Accrington Stanley	2015–16	League Two	0	0	0	0	—		1 (Note: Appearances in Football League Trophy)	0	0	0
Career total			0	0	0	0	—		1	0	1	0
