= Steven Hewitt =

English footballer

Personal information
- Full name: Steven Daniel Hewitt
- Date of birth: 5 December 1993 (age 32)
- Place of birth: Manchester, England
- Height: 5 ft 7 in (1.70 m)
- Position: Attacking midfielder

Team information
- Current team: Nantwich Town

Youth career
- 2008–2012: Burnley

Senior career*
Years	Team	Apps	(Gls)
2011–2015	Burnley	2	(0)
2013	→ Alfreton Town (loan)	15	(1)
2015	→ Southport (loan)	7	(1)
2015–2016	Chester	2	(0)
2016	Southport	12	(0)
2016–2017	Accrington Stanley	9	(0)
2017–2018	Bangor City	29	(8)
2018–2020	Hume City		
2020–2021	Aberystwyth Town	19	(3)
2021–2023	Wythenshawe Town	57	(6)
2023–	Nantwich Town	29	(4)
- * Club domestic league appearances and goals as of 14:38, 13 December 2023 (UTC)

Steven Daniel Hewitt (born 5 December 1993) is an English footballer who plays as an attacking midfielder for Wythenshawe Town.

Hewitt started his career in the youth teams of Blackburn Rovers and Stockport County before signing two-year scholarship terms with Burnley in 2010. He signed his first professional contract in October 2011, on a two-and-a-half-year deal. He made his debut for the club in April 2012.

== Career ==
=== Youth ===
Born in Wythenshawe, Hewitt started his career with Blackburn Rovers as a 9-year-old but was released in 2003 due to his lack of height and speed. He then went on to play for Stockport County for three years, but left because he didn't enjoy the football and went back to playing for his local team. Aged fourteen he was sent on a six-week trial period to Burnley and was signed by the club. He went on to play for the club's youth team aged fifteen and also participated in the prestigious Milk Cup in the Republic of Ireland. In 2010, Hewitt signed a two-year scholarship with the Clarets. He was part of the squad that got to the FA Youth Cup semi-finals for the first time since 1978, scoring against Boston United, Ipswich Town and West Bromwich Albion in the process. He scored a penalty in the 3–1 aggregate defeat against Blackburn Rovers in the semi-final.

=== Professional ===
After impressing during his first year as an apprentice he was taken on the five-day first team pre-season tour to South West England in July 2011. He was an unused substitute for the 2–0 defeat to Bristol Rovers but featured as a substitute in a 3–1 win over Torquay United. In August 2011, Hewitt was given squad number 33, and appeared on the bench for the first time in a 3–2 League Cup win over Barnet. In October, he signed his first professional contract with the club, on a two-and-a-half-year deal. In March 2012, he was included in the first team squad for the Football League Championship match with West Ham United at Turf Moor, again remaining an unused substitute in a 2–2 draw. He made his professional debut on 6 March 2012, in a 1–0 win over Brighton & Hove Albion, coming on as a late substitute for Charlie Austin.

On 31 January 2013, he joined Football Conference side Alfreton Town on loan until 20 April.

In March 2015, he joined Conference Premier side Southport on loan until the end of the season.

On 31 December 2015 it was confirmed that Hewitt would join National League side Chester until the end of the season.

On 11 July 2016 it was confirmed that Hewitt would join League 2 side Accrington Stanley on a 1-year deal.

On 28 August 2020, Hewitt returned to Wales signing for Aberystwyth Town.

== Career statistics ==
As of match played 18 March 2024.

Appearances and goals by club, season and competition
Club	Season	League			National cup		League cup		Other		Total	
Club	Season	Division	Apps	Goals	Apps	Goals	Apps	Goals	Apps	Goals	Apps	Goals
Burnley	2011–12	Championship	1	0	0	0	0	0	—		1	0
Burnley	2012–13	Championship	0	0	0	0	1	0	—		1	0
Burnley	2013–14	Championship	1	0	0	0	0	0	—		1	0
Burnley	2014–15	Premier League	0	0	0	0	0	0	—		0	0
Burnley	Total		2	0	0	0	1	0	—		3	0
Alfreton Town (loan)	2012–13	Conference Premier	15	1	—		—		—		15	1
Southport (loan)	2014–15	Conference Premier	7	1	—		="2"|—		—		7	1
Chester	2015–16	National League	2	0	—		—		1 (Note: Appearances in FA Trophy)	1	3	1
Southport	2015–16	National League	12	0	—		—		—		12	0
Accrington Stanley	2016–17	League Two	9	0	1	0	2	0	2 (Note: Appearances in EFL Trophy)	0	14	0
Bangor City	2017–18	Welsh Premier League	29	8	2	1	1	0	0	0	32	9
Bangor City	2020–21	Cymru Premier	19	3	0	0	0	0	0	0	19	3
Bangor City	Total		48	11	2	1	1	0	0	0	51	12
Wythenshawe Town	2021–22	NWCFL Premier Division	40	5	1	0	1	0	9 (Note: Eight appearances and one goal in FA Vase, one appearance in Manchester Premier Cup)	1	51	6
Wythenshawe Town	2021–22	NWCFL Premier Division	17	1	1	0	2	1	3 (Note: One appearance and one goal in FA Vase, two appearances in Manchester Premier Cup)	1	23	3
Wythenshawe Town	Total		57	6	2	0	3	1	12	2	74	9
Nantwich Town	2022–23	NPL Premier Division	17	4	0	0	0	0	0	0	14	4
Nantwich Town	2023–24	NPL Division One West	15	0	3	1	0	0	8 (Note: Six appearances in FA Trophy, two appearances in Cheshire Senior Cup)	0	26	1
Nantwich Town	Total		29	4	3	1	0	0	8	0	40	5
Career total			181	23	8	2	7	1	23	3	219	29
