= Janoi Donacien =

Saint Lucian footballer (born 1993)

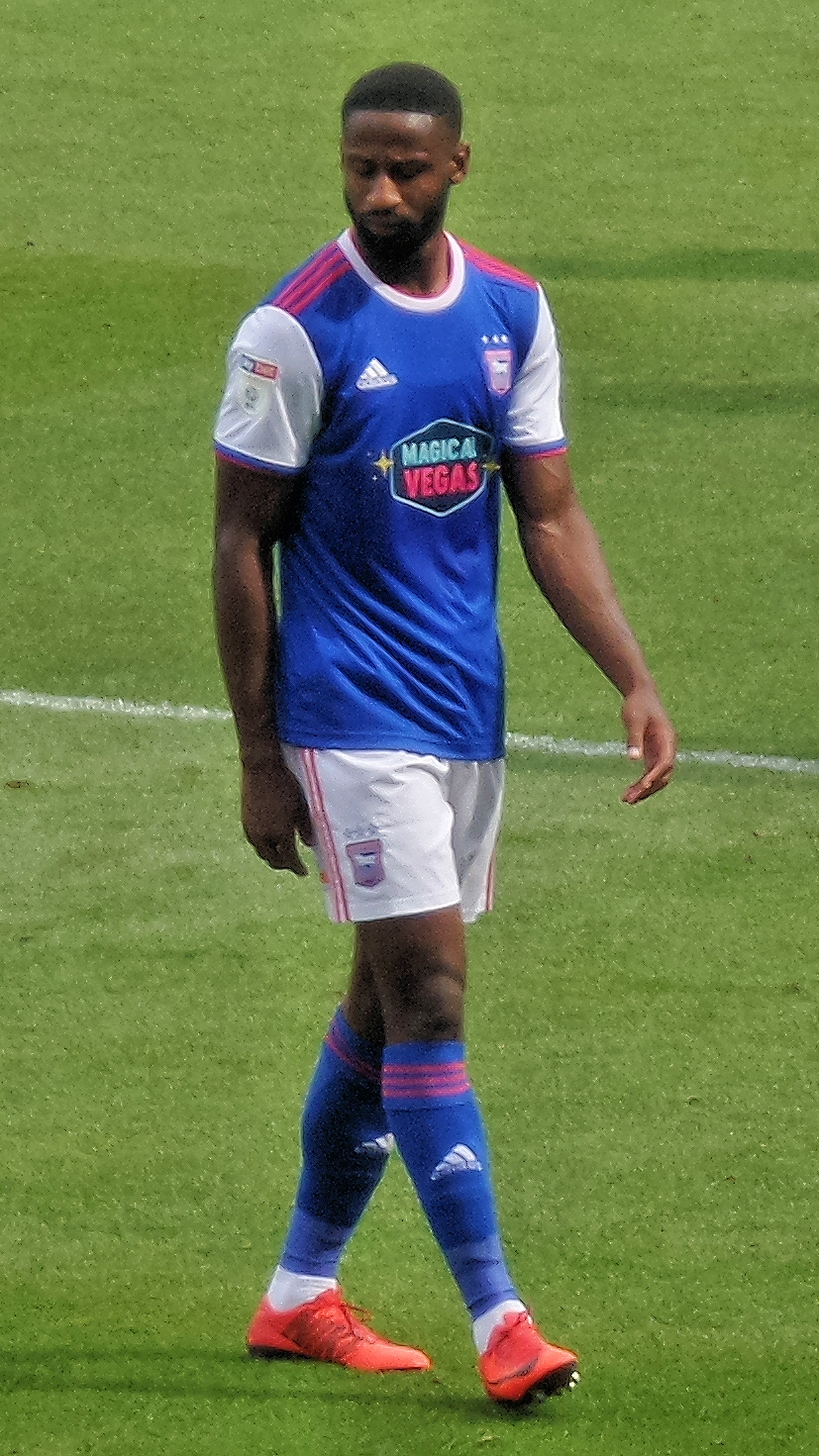
- Donacien on his Ipswich Town debut in 2018

Personal information
- Full name: Janoi Denzil Naieme Donacien
- Date of birth: 3 November 1993 (age 32)
- Place of birth: Castries, Saint Lucia
- Height: 1.83 m (6 ft 0 in)
- Position: Defender

Team information
- Current team: Northampton Town
- Number: 44

Youth career
- 2005–2010: Luton Town
- 2010: Tottenham Hotspur
- 2010–2013: Aston Villa

Senior career*
Years	Team	Apps	(Gls)
2013–2016	Aston Villa	0	(0)
2014–2015	→ Tranmere Rovers (loan)	31	(0)
2015	→ Wycombe Wanderers (loan)	2	(0)
2015–2016	→ Newport County (loan)	29	(0)
2016–2019	Accrington Stanley	80	(1)
2018–2019	→ Ipswich Town (loan)	10	(0)
2019–2024	Ipswich Town	97	(0)
2019	→ Accrington Stanley (loan)	19	(0)
2021	→ Fleetwood Town (loan)	19	(0)
2025–2026	Chesterfield	27	(0)
2026–	Northampton Town	0	(0)

International career^{‡}
2023–	Saint Lucia	4	(0)
- * Club domestic league appearances and goals as of 26 June 2026 ‡ National team caps and goals as of 19:54, 30 September 2024 (UTC)

Janoi Denzil Naieme Donacien (born 3 November 1993) is a Saint Lucian professional footballer who plays as a defender for EFL League Two club Northampton Town and the Saint Lucia national team. A versatile player, he is capable of playing at full-back and centre-back.

Born in Saint Lucia, Donacien moved to England at the age of eight. He began his football career in the academy at Luton Town in 2005. He spent five years in the academy at Luton, going on to spend a brief spell in the youth set up at Tottenham Hotspur in 2010 before joining the Aston Villa Academy later that year. He spent six years at Aston Villa, working his way through the club's academy whilst also spending time out on loan at Tranmere Rovers, Wycombe Wanderers and Newport County during his time at Villa Park. He moved on a permanent deal to Accrington Stanley in 2016, going onto win the EFL League Two title in 2018. He joined Ipswich Town in the summer of 2018, initially on loan before making the deal permanent in January 2019. He spent a spell on loan at former club Accrington Stanley in 2019, as well as a loan at Fleetwood Town in 2021. He helped Ipswich gain promotion from EFL League One during the 2022–23 season following a second-placed league finish.

He made his debut for the Saint Lucia national team in 2023.

== Club career ==
=== Early career ===
Born in Castries, Saint Lucia, Donacien moved to the United Kingdom with his family in 2001 at the age of eight. He began his footballing career in 2005, joining the academy at Luton Town. He spent 5 years at Luton before spending a brief spell in the youth set up at Tottenham Hotspur, representing the club in the 2010 Milk Cup, prior to joining the Aston Villa Academy in 2010.

=== Aston Villa ===
Donacien joined the academy at Aston Villa in 2010, working his way through the academy to represent Villa in youth, reserves and NextGen Series competitions. He was a member of Villa's NextGen Series-winning team during the 2012–13 season. Donacien played his first games for the senior team during the pre-season ahead of the 2013–14 Premier League season, making his non-competitive debut in a pre-season friendly match against Wycombe Wanderers on 22 July 2013. Donacien was awarded a place in the first-team squad and the squad number 32, he went on to be named on the first-team's bench twice during the 2013–14 season, once in the Premier League against Sunderland and once in the FA Cup against Sheffield United.

==== Tranmere Rovers (loan) ====
Donacien was loaned to Tranmere Rovers in August 2014 and made his professional debut in a 2–1 home win against Morecambe at Prenton Park on 30 August 2014. He turned out regularly at both centre-back and right wing-back for Tranmere over the season with a brief spell back at Villa Park after the January transfer window, the side finished bottom of League Two, being relegated to the National League. Donacien made a total of 37 appearances during his first season in professional football.

==== Wycombe Wanderers (loan) ====
On 21 August 2015 he signed a one-month loan deal with Wycombe Wanderers, He made his debut for Wycombe a day later in a 1–1 draw with Dagenham & Redbridge. He made 2 league appearances for Wycombe before returning to Villa Park on 19 September.

==== Newport County (loan) ====
On 24 September 2015 he joined Newport County on loan. He made his debut for Newport on 26 September in the starting line-up for the League Two match against Carlisle United. In January 2016 the loan was extended to the end of the 2015–16 season. Donacien made 31 appearances across all competitions during his loan spell at Newport.

=== Accrington Stanley ===
On 5 August 2016 Donacien signed for Accrington Stanley on a free transfer. He made his debut for Accrington on the opening day of the 2016–17 season in a 3–2 win against Doncaster Rovers. Donacien scored his first goal for Accrington, and first senior goal of his career, on 29 October 2016 in the 1–3 League Two defeat against Newport County. During his first season at Accrington, Donacien made a total of 41 appearances.

Donacien played a key role for Accrington as they won the EFL League Two title and promotion to EFL League One for the first time in the club's history in the 2017–18 season. He featured in 45 of Accrington's 46 league matches during the season and made 51 appearances in total across all competitions. Donacien made a total of 92 appearances in all competitions during two seasons at the Crown Ground, scoring one goal.

=== Ipswich Town ===
On 31 July 2018 Donacien signed for EFL Championship side Ipswich Town, initially on loan with a view to becoming a permanent deal once he received his new UK work permit. He made his debut for the club on the opening day of the 2018–19 season in a 2–2 draw with Blackburn Rovers. All of his appearances during the early stages of the season came under Paul Hurst, however after Hurst was sacked in October and replaced by Paul Lambert, who had previously been the manager at Aston Villa during Donacien’s time at the club, he did not make a single appearance for Ipswich for the remainder of the season. His transfer to Ipswich was made permanent in January 2019, signing a three-year contract for a reported fee of £750,000. He made 11 appearances during his first season at Portman Road, before returning to former club Accrington Stanley on loan in January, with Ipswich ultimately suffering relegation to EFL League One during the season.

==== Accrington Stanley (loan) ====
On 18 January 2019, Donacien returned to Accrington Stanley on loan until the end of the season. He made his return debut to Accrington in a 0–1 FA Cup defeat to Derby County on 26 January. He made 20 appearances for Accrington during the second half of the 2018–19 season, helping the Lancashire club secure League One safety.

==== Return to Ipswich ====
He started the 2019–20 season as the first choice right-back at Ipswich, starting in the 1–0 opening day win over Burton Albion. He started the following three league games of the season, however the signing of Kane Vincent-Young in August saw his game time reduced in the league. He featured regularly in the EFL Trophy, starting every group stage match as Ipswich finished second in the group, qualifying for the second round as a result. He also made regular appearances in the FA Cup. Following an injury to Vincent-Young in October, he competed for a starting place in the first-team with stand-in right-back Gwion Edwards. He made a total of 19 appearances across all competitions before the 2019–20 season was suspended due to the Coronavirus outbreak in March.

Donacien saw his game time limited to a handful of appearances in cup competitions during the first-half of the 2020–21 season, making only 3 appearances across the FA Cup, EFL Cup and EFL Trophy before being sent out on loan to Fleetwood Town in the January transfer window.

==== Fleetwood Town (loan) ====
On 22 January 2021, Donacien joined Fleetwood Town on loan for the remainder of the 2020–21 season. He made his Fleetwood Town debut the following day, starting the match in a 0–0 draw with Wigan Athletic. In total, Donacien made 19 appearances during his loan spell with Fleetwood.

==== Second return to Ipswich ====
On 10 May 2021, Ipswich announced that they had taken up the option to extend Donacien's contract by an additional year, keeping him under contract until 2022.

The 2021–22 season and the arrival of Paul Cook as Ipswich's new manager saw Donacien feature as a regular starter for the first time since joining Ipswich. He was a key part of the first-team during the season, featuring primarily as a right-back under Paul Cook during the first-half of the season. He quickly formed a strong partnership with new signing Wes Burns on the right-hand side of the team. In November 2021, Donacien signed a new contract with Ipswich until 2023, with the option of an additional one-year extension. He continued to feature regularly during the season after Cook was sacked in December and replaced by Kieran McKenna. He played primarily as a right sided centre-back under McKenna as Ipswich's defensive record improved considerably, playing as part of a defense which set a new club record for the length of time without the team conceding a goal, surpassing the previous record of 547 minutes. During the season he started 40 league matches and also came on as a substitute in a further 3 league matches. In total, Donacien made 48 appearances throughout the 2021–22 season, the most of any Ipswich player, whilst also making more league starts than any other player.

He continued to be a key part of Kieran McKenna's team during the 2022–23 season, featuring more at right-back as the season progressed and Ipswich changed system. In January, Ipswich signed Harry Clarke from Arsenal, reducing Donacien's game time as a regular starter, although he still served as an important part of the squad. He once again helped Ipswich set a new club record for consecutive time without conceding, setting a run of 9 consecutive clean sheets and 949 minutes without conceding a goal, surpassing the record set by the team the previous season. In April 2023, Ipswich exercised the option in Donacien's contract to extend his deal by an additional year, keeping him contracted to the club until summer 2024. He made a total of 42 appearances in all competitions during the season, 38 of which came in the league as he helped Ipswich win promotion back to the Championship following a second-placed league finish.

On 3 June 2024, Ipswich said that although the player's contract had expired, he would continue his rehabilitation throughout the off-season "and will return to pre-season training alongside the first-team squad as he builds towards a successful 2024/25 campaign".

=== Chesterfield ===
On 12 January 2025, Donacien joined League Two side Chesterfield on a short-term contract until the end of the season. On 25 September 2025, after spending the summer completing his injury rehabilitation at the club, he signed a new contract until the end of the season. On 22 May 2026, the club announced the player was being released.

=== Northampton Town ===
On 26 June 2026, Donacien agreed to join Northampton Town on a one-year deal following their relegation to League Two.

== International career ==
Donacien received his first call-up to the Saint Lucia national team in June 2023. He made his debut for Saint Lucia on 16 June 2023 in a 1–3 defeat against Martinique in a 2023 CONCACAF Gold Cup qualification first preliminary round match at the DRV PNK Stadium in Fort Lauderdale, Florida.

== Style of play ==
Donacien is a versatile defender, capable of playing anywhere in defense, primarily either at full-back or centre-back. He is known for his tackling ability, athleticism and one-v-one defending. In August 2022, Ipswich manager Kieran McKenna said of Donacien; "He certainly has the athleticism to get up and down the pitch and technically he’s growing and finding more belief in himself now."

== Personal life ==
Donacien's immigration status made national headlines in 2012 as he and his family were denied permanent residency by the United Kingdom Home Office. Donacien and his family were granted three years of discretionary leave to remain in the United Kingdom in 2012. In October 2018 it was revealed that Donacien was waiting to receive a biometric residence permit from the UK Home Office, which would grant him permanent residency to the United Kingdom, despite having lived in the UK since 2001. In January 2019 it was announced that his Leave to remain had been confirmed, granting him permanent residency in the UK.

== Career statistics ==
=== Club ===
As of match played 8 August 2026

Appearances and goals by club, season and competition
Club	Season	League			FA Cup		League Cup		Other		Total	
Club	Season	Division	Apps	Goals	Apps	Goals	Apps	Goals	Apps	Goals	Apps	Goals
Aston Villa	2013–14	Premier League	0	0	0	0	0	0	—		0	0
Aston Villa	2014–15	Premier League	0	0	0	0	0	0	—		0	0
Aston Villa	2015–16	Premier League	0	0	0	0	0	0	—		0	0
Aston Villa	Total		0	0	0	0	0	0	0	0	0	0
Tranmere Rovers (loan)	2014–15	League Two	31	0	4	0	0	0	2 (Note: Appearances in Football League Trophy)	0	37	0
Wycombe Wanderers (loan)	2015–16	League Two	2	0	0	0	0	0	0	0	2	0
Newport County (loan)	2015–16	League Two	29	0	2	0	0	0	0	0	31	0
Accrington Stanley	2016–17	League Two	35	1	2	0	3	0	1 (Note: Appearance(s) in EFL Trophy)	0	41	1
Accrington Stanley	2017–18	League Two	45	0	2	0	1	0	3	0	51	0
Accrington Stanley	Total		80	1	4	0	4	0	4	0	92	1
Ipswich Town	2018–19 (Note: Donacien initially joined Ipswich on loan in July 2018 before signing permanently in January 2019)	Championship	10	0	0	0	1	0	—		11	0
Ipswich Town	2019–20	League One	13	0	3	0	0	0	3	0	19	0
Ipswich Town	2020–21	League One	0	0	1	0	1	0	1	0	3	0
Ipswich Town	2021–22	League One	43	0	3	0	1	0	1	0	48	0
Ipswich Town	2022–23	League One	38	0	3	0	0	0	1	0	42	0
Ipswich Town	2023–24	Championship	3	0	0	0	1	0	—		4	0
Ipswich Town	Total		107	0	10	0	4	0	6	0	127	0
Accrington Stanley (loan)	2018–19	League One	19	0	1	0	0	0	0	0	20	0
Fleetwood Town (loan)	2020–21	League One	19	0	0	0	0	0	0	0	19	0
Chesterfield	2024–25	League Two	7	0	0	0	0	0	1	0	8	0
Chesterfield	2025–26	League Two	20	0	1	0	0	0	4 (Note: Two appearances in EFL Trophy, two appearances in EFL League Two play-offs)	0	25	0
Chesterfield	Total		27	0	1	0	0	0	5	0	33	0
Northampton Town	2026–27	League Two	0	0	0	0	1	0	0	0	1	0
Career total			314	1	22	0	9	0	17	0	362	1

=== International ===
As of match played 6 September 2024

Appearances and goals by national team and year
National team	Year	Apps	Goals
Saint Lucia	2023	3	0
Saint Lucia	2024	1	0
Total		4	0

== Honours ==
Aston Villa U19

- NextGen Series: 2012–13

Accrington Stanley

- EFL League Two: 2017–18

Ipswich Town

- EFL League One runner-up: 2022–23
- EFL Championship runner-up: 2023–24
