= Brayden Shaw =

English footballer

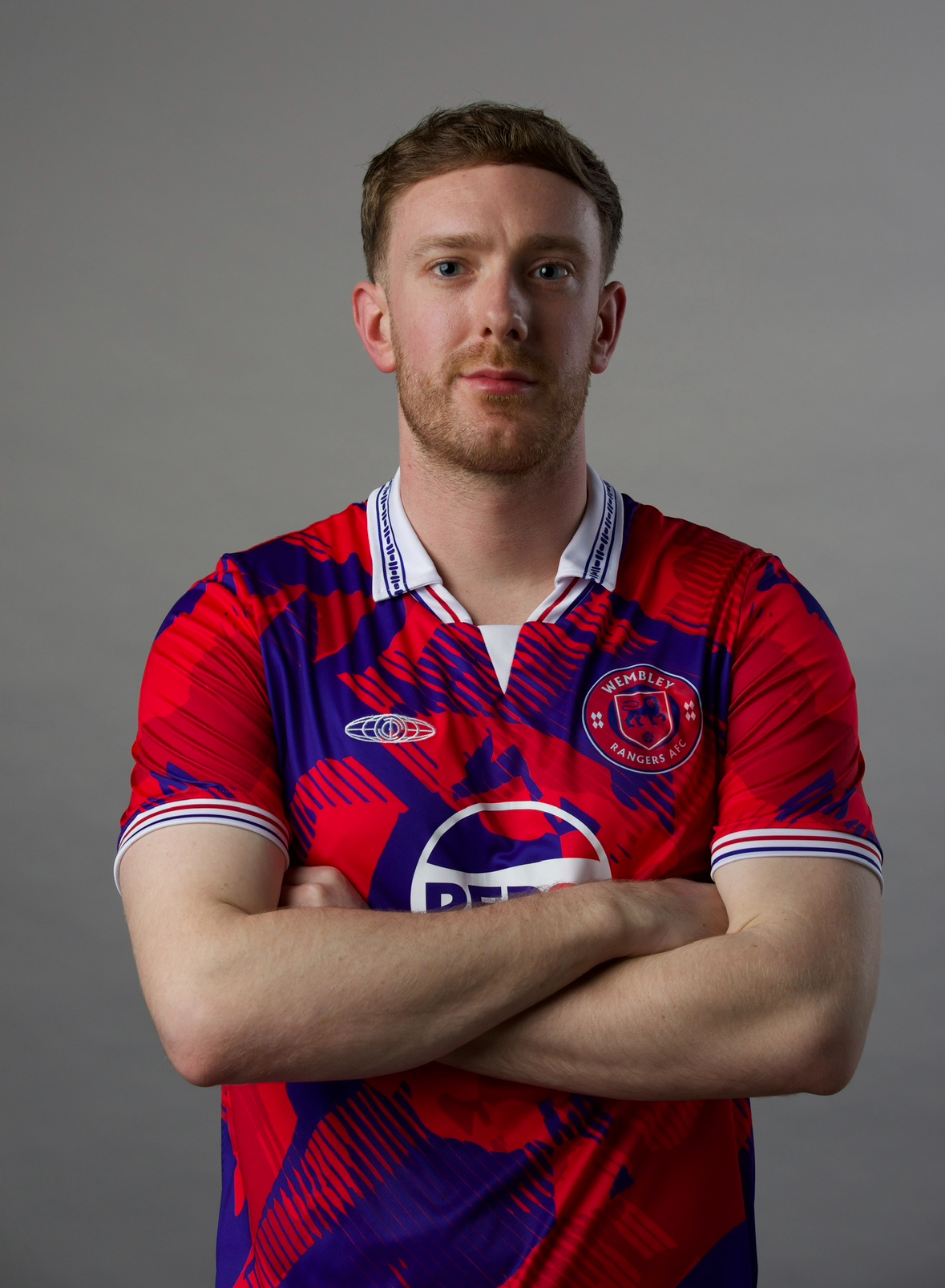

Personal information
- Full name: Brayden Lewis Shaw
- Date of birth: 25 February 1997 (age 29)
- Place of birth: Blackburn, England
- Position: Midfielder

Youth career
- –2015: Bury

Senior career*
Years	Team	Apps	(Gls)
2015–2016	Bury	0	(0)
2016–2017	Accrington Stanley	6	(0)
2016–2017	→ Bangor City (loan)	18	(4)
2017–2018	Bangor City	22	(6)
2018–2020	Cardiff City	0	(0)
2020–2021	Connah's Quay Nomads	5	(2)
2022	AFC Telford United	8	(5)
2024-2025	Lancaster City	26	(5)
- * Club domestic league appearances and goals as of 05:33, 30 July 2023 (UTC)

Brayden Lewis Shaw (born 25 February 1997) is an English footballer who plays as a midfielder.

== Career ==
Shaw graduated through the Bury youth system, signing a professional contract with the club in June 2015.

In January 2016, Shaw signed a short-term deal with League Two side Accrington Stanley following a successful trial spell. He made his debut in the Football League on 20 February, coming on as an 80th-minute substitute for Romuald Boco in a 2–1 victory over Oxford United at the Manor Ground. During his time with Stanley after a long-term injury, Shaw was loaned to Welsh Premier League side Bangor City, where he was named Welsh Premier League Player of the Month for December 2016. Shaw was offered a new contract at the end of the season but signed for Welsh Premier League side Bangor City for an undisclosed league record fee.

He signed for National League North strugglers AFC Telford United on non-contract terms after impressing on trial.

In July 2025 on leaving Lancaster City, he announced he was taking a break from the sport, following the death of his sister from blood cancer.

== Career statistics ==
As of 22 January 2017.

Season	Club	League			National Cup		League Cup		Other		Total	
Season	Club	Division	Apps	Goals	Apps	Goals	Apps	Goals	Apps	Goals	Apps	Goals
2015–16	Bury	League One	0	0	0	0	0	0	0	0	0	0
Total			0	0	0	0	0	0	0	0	0	0
2015–16	Accrington Stanley	League Two	4	0	0	0	0	0	0	0	4	0
Total			4	0	0	0	0	0	0	0	4	0
2016-17	Bangor City (loan)	WPL	18	3	1	1	2	0	-	-	20	4
Career total			21	2	0	0	2	0	0	0	23	2
