= Paddy Lacey =

English footballer

Patrick Lacey
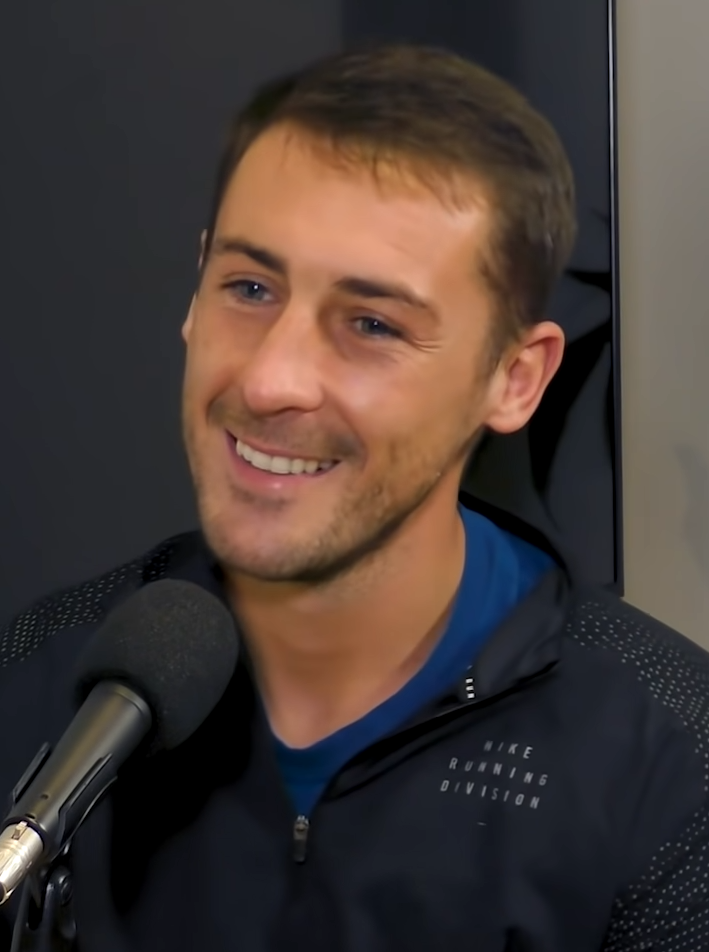
- Lacey in 2022

Personal information
- Full name: Patrick Sean Lacey
- Date of birth: 16 March 1993 (age 33)
- Place of birth: Liverpool, England
- Position: Midfielder

Team information
- Current team: Flint Town United

Youth career
- Tranmere Rovers
- Manchester United
- Liverpool
- Sheffield Wednesday

Senior career*
Years	Team	Apps	(Gls)
2011–2012	Bradford City	0	(0)
2011	→ Southport (loan)	0	(0)
2011–2012	→ Vauxhall Motors (loan)	6	(1)
2012	Droylsden	12	(1)
2012–2013	Altrincham	26	(0)
2013–2016	Barrow	89	(4)
2016–2017	Accrington Stanley	11	(1)
2019–2020	Southport	14	(0)
2020	Stalybridge Celtic	7	(1)
2020–2022	Chester	22	(3)
2022–2023	Warrington Rylands 1906	10	(0)
2023–2024	Flint Town United	16	(0)
- * Club domestic league appearances and goals as of 11 February 2024

Paddy Lacey
Personal information
- Weight: Middleweight

Boxing career
- Stance: Orthodox

Boxing record
- Total fights: 10
- Wins: 10
- Win by KO: 2
- Losses: 0
- Draws: 0
- No contests: 0

Patrick Sean Lacey (born 16 March 1993) is an English footballer who plays as a midfielder. He made eleven appearances in the Football League for Accrington Stanley. Lacey has since also competed in boxing, with his debut fight occurring in October 2021.

== Football career ==
=== Early career ===
Lacey started his career in the academy of Tranmere Rovers, before joining Manchester United, where he played alongside players such as Ravel Morrison and Jesse Lingard. After a month with Manchester United, he was given the chance to join Liverpool, the club he had supported as a child, and took up this offer.

=== Bradford City ===
On 8 July 2011, Lacey signed for EFL League Two club Bradford City on a one-year deal following his release from Sheffield Wednesday. During his time at Bradford he had loan spells at Southport and Vauxhall Motors, before agreeing to depart the club by mutual consent on 31 January 2012.

=== Accrington Stanley ===
On 21 July 2016, he joined Accrington Stanley on a one-year deal. He made his debut for Stanley in the club's 1–0 EFL Cup victory against Burnley on 24 August, coming off the bench in the 83rd minute for Billy Kee. He made his Football League debut, and first league appearance for Accrington, against Morecambe on 27 August, coming off the bench in the 82nd minute for Shay McCartan. He scored his first goal for the club in a 1–0 win over Portsmouth on 17 September.

On 5 May 2017, Accrington announced they had terminated Lacey's contract after he admitted to a breach of anti-doping regulations. He had been given a 14-month ban by the Football Association having tested positive for benzoylecgonine, a metabolite of cocaine, following a game against Hartlepool United the previous November.

One month after his contract was terminated, Lacey was arrested at Glastonbury Festival in possession of 20.3 grams of cocaine, 16.8 grams of MDMA, and £520 in counterfeit £20 notes. He pleaded guilty to two counts of possessing a controlled substance, and passing an item as genuine which he knew to be a counterfeit. He was sentenced to 16 months in prison in July 2017.

=== Return to non-league football ===
Following his release from prison, on 14 January 2019 it was confirmed that Lacey had joined Southport on an 18-month contract.

In January 2020, he joined Northern Premier League Premier Division club Stalybridge Celtic before later joining Chester in September 2020. After suffering a knee injury in February 2021, Lacey raised funds to pay for the surgery he needed.

On 15 February 2022, it was announced that Lacey had decided to leave Chester in order to take up an offer with an unnamed Northern Premier League club.

On 16 February 2022, Lacey signed for Northern Premier League Division One West side Warrington Rylands 1906 on a short-term deal until the end of the 2021–22 season.

On 29 July 2023, Cymru North side Flint Town United announced the signing of Lacey from Warrington Rylands. Just days later, on 1 August, Lacey's younger brother Luis joined him at Flint Town on loan from Tranmere Rovers. He made his league debut for the Silksmen on 18 August against Ruthin Town, receiving a red card in the 53rd minute of the 1–1 draw.

== Attempted murder charge ==
On 20 February 2026, Lacey was charged with attempted murder.

Paddy Lacey was found not guilty of all charges on 25 September 2026.

== Boxing career ==
Lacey has also fought as a professional boxer, alongside his semi-professional football career and his day job as a carpet fitter.

=== Professional boxing record ===
10 wins (2 knockouts, 8 decisions), 0 losses
Res.	Record	Opponent	Type	Round, time	Date	Location	Notes
Win	1–0	(Croatia) Stanko Jermelic	PTS	4	15 October 2021	(United Kingdom) Olympia, Liverpool, Merseyside	Professional boxing debut.
Win	2–0	(Czech Republic) Pavel Albrecht	PTS	4	26 November 2021	(United Kingdom) Olympia, Liverpool, Merseyside	
Win	3–0	(Russia) Vasif Mamedov	PTS	4	11 December 2021	(United Kingdom) Liverpool Arena, Liverpool, Merseyside	
Win	4–0	(United Kingdom) Josh Crook	PTS	4	5 March 2022	(United Kingdom) Olympia, Liverpool, Merseyside	
Win	5–0	(United Kingdom) Jake Bray	PTS	4	14 May 2022	(United Kingdom) Winter Gardens, Blackpool, Lancashire	
Win	6–0	(United Kingdom) Ryan Broten	TKO	1 (4), 0:43	17 June 2022	(United Kingdom) Liverpool Arena, Liverpool, Merseyside	
Win	7–0	(United Kingdom) Seamus Devlin	PTS	6	3 September 2022	(United Kingdom) Liverpool Arena, Liverpool, Merseyside	
Win	8–0	(United Kingdom) James McCarthy	PTS	6	11 March 2023	(United Kingdom) Liverpool Arena, Liverpool, Merseyside	
Win	9–0	(Mexico) Fernando Valencia	PTS	4	23 September 2023	(United Kingdom) Grand Central Hall, Liverpool, Merseyside	
Win	10–0	(United Kingdom) Owen Kirk	KO	1 (8), 1:40	21 October 2023	(United Kingdom) Liverpool Arena, Liverpool, Merseyside	

== Personal life ==
Paddy Lacey grew up in Crosby, Liverpool and attended St Edmund's and St Thomas's Primary School, Waterloo and Sacred Heart Catholic College, Crosby. Lacey's brothers, Luis and Shea, are also footballers, playing for Macclesfield and Manchester United, respectively. He also has an older sister, Lauren, who has a son named Zack and was expecting another child at the time. Paddy has a son called Patrick to his girlfriend Sarah Woods. Born in England, Lacey is of Irish descent.
