= Elizabeth Cullingford =

American scholar

Elizabeth Cullingford is an American scholar of literature and Irish literature and the Jane Weinert Blumberg Chair and University Distinguished Teaching Professor at the University of Texas at Austin. After earning her doctorate at Oxford, Cullingford decided to become a professor at the University of Texas at Austin in 1980. Throughout her time teaching, from 2006 to 2019, Cullingford served as the Chair of the English Department and received the Pro Bene Meritis Award from the College of Liberal Arts at the University of Texas at Austin in 2016.

== Publications ==
- Ireland’s Others: Ethnicity and Gender in Irish Literature and Popular Culture, 2001
- Gender and History in Yeats's Love Poetry, 1993; and Yeats, Ireland and Fascism, 1981.
