= Matty Pearson =

English footballer (born 1993)

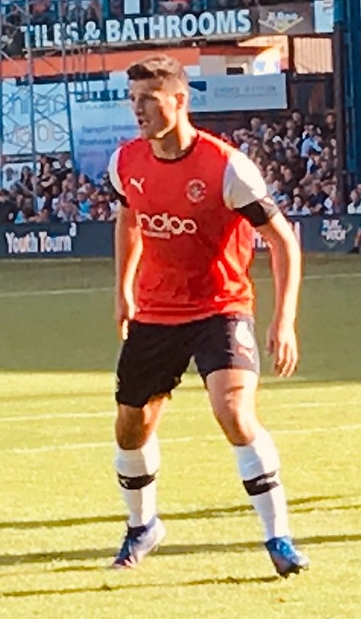
- Pearson playing for Luton Town in 2019

Personal information
- Full name: Matthew Joe Pearson
- Date of birth: 3 August 1993 (age 33)
- Place of birth: Keighley, England
- Height: 6 ft 3 in (1.90 m)
- Position: Defender

Team information
- Current team: Doncaster Rovers
- Number: 5

Youth career
- 2003–2011: Blackburn Rovers

Senior career*
Years	Team	Apps	(Gls)
2011–2012	Blackburn Rovers	0	(0)
2012	→ Lincoln City (loan)	0	(0)
2012–2013	Rochdale	9	(0)
2013	→ FC Halifax Town (loan)	17	(0)
2013–2015	FC Halifax Town	84	(5)
2015–2017	Accrington Stanley	89	(11)
2017–2018	Barnsley	17	(0)
2018–2021	Luton Town	128	(10)
2021–2025	Huddersfield Town	123	(16)
2025–	Doncaster Rovers	31	(1)

International career
2010	England U18	1	(0)
2013–2015	England C	9	(2)
- * Club domestic league appearances and goals as of 14 December 2025 (UTC)

Matthew Joe Pearson (born 3 August 1993) is an English professional footballer who plays as a defender for EFL League One club Doncaster Rovers.

== Career ==
=== Blackburn Rovers ===
Born and raised in Keighley, Pearson joined Blackburn Rovers at the age of 10, progressing through the academy to sign his first professional contract in the summer of 2011.

On 5 January 2012, he joined Conference Premier club Lincoln City on a youth loan. Pearson made his debut for Lincoln on 18 January, in a 3–1 defeat at Carshalton Athletic in the FA Trophy. However, his loan was cut short two months early as he was recalled by his parent club.

=== Rochdale ===
On 31 July 2012, Pearson joined League Two club Rochdale on a one-year contract after his release by Blackburn.

Pearson made his professional debut on 11 August 2012, in a 4–3 defeat to Barnsley in the League Cup and made his league debut for the club, making a start and played the whole game, in a 0–0 draw against Northampton Town in the opening game of the season. Pearson then set up one of the goals, in a 2–0 win over Barnet on 1 September 2012. However, Pearson soon lost his first team place, as the season progressed and made nine appearances for the club.

Pearson was released by Rochdale at the end of his contract.

=== FC Halifax Town ===
On 1 March 2013, Pearson joined FC Halifax Town on loan, making his debut for the club in the following day's 5–0 Conference North home victory over Worcester City. Pearson became a first team regular at the club, having made 17 appearances for the club.

Pearson signed for Halifax permanently on a two-year contract on 30 June 2013. His first appearance after signing permanently came in the opening match of the season, a 5–1 defeat away to Cambridge United, before scoring his first goal in a 1–1 away draw with Gateshead on 26 December. After serving a two-match suspension, Pearson scored on his return on 1 March 2014, in a 2–0 win over Tamworth. Despite being suspended twice in the season, Pearson finished the 2013–14 season, making 46 appearances and scoring two times in all competitions. For his performance, Pearson had his contract with the club extended.

In the 2014–15 season, Pearson started the season well when he scored his first goal of the season, in a 3–0 win over Chester on 23 August 2014. However, Pearson was sent off in the 52nd minute, in a 2–1 loss against Welling United on 22 November 2014. After serving a three-match suspension, he made his first team return, coming on as a substitute in the second half, in a 2–0 win over Nuneaton Town on 20 December 2014. Pearson then scored two goals in two matches against Dartford and Telford United. Pearson went on to finish the 2014–15 season, making 42 appearances and scoring three times in all competitions.

=== Accrington Stanley ===
Due to his good performance at Halifax, Pearson joined League Two club Accrington Stanley, signing a one-year contract. Upon joining the club, Pearson said joining a club based on playing in the Football League was "too good to miss", stating he would regret if he reject the opportunity.

Pearson made his Accrington Stanley debut, making his first start and played the whole game, in the opening game of the season, in a 1–1 draw against Luton Town. Since making his debut, Pearson become an immediate first team regular at the club and earned himself a nickname as "Mr Angry" whenever he's on the pitch, though Pearson, himself, stated he's a serious player, rather than angry. He scored his first goal for the club on 24 October 2015, in a 3–1 win over Dagenham & Redbridge. Pearson's second goal for the club came on 28 November 2015, in a 5–1 win over York City. As a result, he was awarded with a new contract in January. His second goal later came on 13 February 2016, in a 4–1 win over Crawley Town. In the 2015–16 season, Pearson played all 46 league matches and scoring three times in his first season, as well as, playing 52 matches in all competitions.

In the 2016–17 season, Pearson scored his first goal of the season, in the opening game of the season, in a 3–2 win over Doncaster Rovers. Two weeks later on 24 August 2016, he scored again in the last minute of extra time, in a 1–0 win over Burnley in the second round of the League Cup. Six days later, on 30 August 2016, he was given the captaincy for the first time for the whole game, in a 3–0 loss against Crewe Alexandra. He started every match since the start of the season until he was suspended in late-November. After returning to the first team from suspension, Pearson scored again on 2 January 2017, as well as, setting up one of the goals, in a 2–2 draw against Hartlepool United. Several weeks later, however, he was sent-off in "the 12th minute when defender Matty Pearson's challenge on Macaulay Gillesphey was judged high and dangerous by referee Chris Sarginson", in a 1–1 draw against Carlisle United on 21 January 2017. After serving two match ban, Pearson then went on to score five goals between 18 February 2017 and 14 March 2017, including a brace against Leyton Orient. He also scored again towards the end of the season on 29 April 2017, in a 4–1 loss against Luton Town. At the end of the 2016–17 season, Pearson went on to make a total of 51 appearances and scoring 9 times in all competitions.

=== Barnsley ===
Despite saying he would stay at Accrington Stanley for the 2017–18 season, Pearson signed for Barnsley, signing a three-year contract on 4 August 2017. Although the move was an undisclosed fee, it was reported the transfer fee was in the region of £500,000.

Pearson made his Barnsley debut, where he started the whole game, in a 4–3 win over Morecambe on 8 August 2017. Seven days later on 15 August 2017, he scored his first goal for Barnsley in a 2–1 win against Nottingham Forest. Since then, Pearson found himself in and out of the first team, due to strong competitions and played in the left-back position as a result. This also combined with his own injury concern.

=== Luton Town ===
Pearson signed for newly promoted League One club Luton Town on 26 June 2018 on a three-year contract for an undisclosed fee.

=== Huddersfield Town ===
Pearson agreed to sign for fellow Championship club Huddersfield Town on 20 May 2021 on a three-year contract, with the option of a further year, effective from 1 July. He scored his first goal for Huddersfield in a 5–1 defeat to Fulham on 14 August 2021.

Pearson was released by the club upon the expiration of his contract at the end of the 2024–25 season.

=== Doncaster Rovers ===
On 12 June 2025, Pearson agreed to join newly promoted League One side Doncaster Rovers on a two-year deal.

== International career ==
After appearing once in the England U18, Pearson was called up by England C in September 2013. Pearson made his England C debut against Latvia U23 and played the whole game and almost scored, in a 1–0 defeat. After the match, Pearson reflected on his England C debut, stating it was a great experience and hope he can have that chance again.

== Career statistics ==
As of end of 2024–25 season

Appearances and goals by club, season and competition
Club	Season	League			FA Cup		League Cup		Other		Total	
Club	Season	Division	Apps	Goals	Apps	Goals	Apps	Goals	Apps	Goals	Apps	Goals
Blackburn Rovers	2011–12	Premier League	0	0	0	0	0	0	—		0	0
Lincoln City (loan)	2011–12	Conference Premier	0	0	—		—		2 (Note: Appearances in FA Trophy)	0	2	0
Rochdale	2012–13	League Two	9	0	1	0	1	0	2 (Note: Appearances in Football League Trophy)	0	13	0
FC Halifax Town (loan)	2012–13	Conference North	17	0	—		—		3 (Note: Appearances in Conference North play-offs)	0	20	0
FC Halifax Town	2013–14	Conference Premier	43	2	2	0	—		3 (Note: One appearance in FA Trophy, two in Conference Premier play-offs)	0	48	2
FC Halifax Town	2014–15	Conference Premier	41	3	3	0	—		5	1	49	4
FC Halifax Town	Total		101	5	5	0	—		11	1	117	6
Accrington Stanley	2015–16	League Two	46	3	2	0	1	0	3 (Note: One appearance in Football League Trophy, two in League Two play-offs)	0	52	3
Accrington Stanley	2016–17	League Two	43	8	3	0	3	1	2 (Note: Appearance(s) in EFL Trophy)	0	51	9
Accrington Stanley	Total		89	11	5	0	4	1	5	0	103	12
Barnsley	2017–18	Championship	17	0	0	0	2	0	—		19	0
Luton Town	2018–19	League One	46	6	4	0	1	0	1	0	52	6
Luton Town	2019–20	Championship	42	2	1	0	0	0	—		43	2
Luton Town	2020–21	Championship	40	2	0	0	1	0	—		41	2
Luton Town	Total		128	10	5	0	2	0	1	0	136	10
Huddersfield Town	2021–22	Championship	37	3	3	1	2	0	—		42	4
Huddersfield Town	2022–23	Championship	18	5	0	0	0	0	—		18	5
Huddersfield Town	2023–24	Championship	39	3	0	0	0	0	—		39	3
Huddersfield Town	2024–25	League One	29	5	1	0	2	0	4	0	36	5
Huddersfield Town	Total		123	16	4	1	4	0	4	0	135	17
Career total			467	42	20	1	13	1	25	1	525	45

== Honours ==
FC Halifax Town

- Conference North play-offs: 2013

Luton Town

- EFL League One: 2018–19

Individual

- Accrington Stanley Player of the Year: 2016–17
- Huddersfield Town Player of the Year: 2022–23
