= Reece Webb-Foster =

English footballer

Personal information
- Full name: Reece Patrick Webb-Foster
- Date of birth: 7 March 1998 (age 28)
- Place of birth: Haworth, England
- Position: Striker

Team information
- Current team: Mossley

Youth career
- Bradford City

Senior career*
Years	Team	Apps	(Gls)
2014–2018	Bradford City	2	(0)
2016	→ Bradford Park Avenue (loan)	7	(3)
2016	→ Guiseley (loan)	5	(1)
2016	→ Harrogate Town (loan)	2	(1)
2017	→ Bradford Park Avenue (loan)	2	(0)
2018	Colne	6	(5)
2018–2019	Lancaster City		
2019	Colne		
2019	Ossett United	2	(0)
2019	Droylsden		
2019–2020	Buxton	0	(0)
2020	Droylsden		
2020–2022	Colne	34	(19)
2022	Matlock Town	7	(0)
2022–2023	Clitheroe		
2023–	Mossley		
- * Club domestic league appearances and goals as of 10:04, 1 August 2022 (UTC)

Reece Patrick Webb-Foster (born 7 March 1998) is an English professional footballer who plays for Mossley as a striker.

== Career ==
Born in Haworth, Webb-Foster played youth football for Bradford City, where he was described as "prolific" and a "natural finisher" by the club's head of academy coaching Steve Thornber.

He made his senior debut for the club on 23 September 2014, appearing as a substitute in a League Cup match. He is one of the club's youngest ever players – his made his debut at the age of 16 years 200 days, which is 59 days older than the club's youngest ever player Robert Cullingford. He made his league debut on 11 April 2015, again appearing as a substitute.

He turned professional in November 2015, signing a contract until 2018.

He joined Bradford Park Avenue on loan in February 2016, alongside Dylan Mottley-Henry. He was recalled by Bradford City in April 2016, to rejoin their first-team squad.

Ahead of the 2016–17 season, he joined the first team pre-season training for the first time.

In September 2016, he moved on loan to Guiseley for one month, after Bradford City manager Stuart McCall stated that he felt a loan move would "benefit his development".

In October 2016, he signed a one-month loan deal with Harrogate Town.

He re-joined Bradford Park Avenue on loan in January 2017. In February 2017, he suffered a serious knee injury. He returned to action, for the reserve team, in January 2018.

He was released by Bradford City at the end of the 2017–18 season. He signed for Colne in August 2018, scoring 5 goals in 6 league games before moving to Lancaster City in October 2018. He re-joined Colne in March 2019.

After leaving Colne he signed for Ossett United, making his debut on 1 October 2019 in the FA Trophy. He made a further 2 league appearances for the club.

He later played for Droylsden and Buxton, leaving the latter club in January 2020 to re-join Droylsden for a third spell. His second spell at Droylsden had been in November 2019.

He returned to Colne in June 2020.

In February 2022 he joined Matlock Town in a swap-deal with Jesurun Uchegbulan going the other way. Webb-Foster joined Clitheroe in July 2022 for an undisclosed fee.

He joined Mossley On 16 December 2023.

== Career statistics ==
As of end of 2021–22 season

Appearances and goals by club, season and competition
Club	Season	League			FA Cup		League Cup		Other		Total	
Club	Season	Division	Apps	Goals	Apps	Goals	Apps	Goals	Apps	Goals	Apps	Goals
Bradford City	2014–15	League One	1	0	0	0	1	0	0	0	2	0
Bradford City	2015–16	League One	0	0	0	0	0	0	0	0	0	0
Bradford City	2016–17	League One	1	0	0	0	1	0	1	0	3	0
Bradford City	2017–18	League One	0	0	0	0	0	0	0	0	0	0
Bradford City	Total		2	0	0	0	2	0	1	0	5	0
Bradford Park Avenue (loan)	2015–16	National League North	7	3	0	0	0	0	1	1	8	4
Guiseley (loan)	2016–17	National League	5	1	0	0	0	0	0	0	5	1
Harrogate Town (loan)	2016–17	National League North	2	1	1	0	0	0	0	0	3	1
Bradford Park Avenue (loan)	2016–17	National League North	2	0	0	0	0	0	0	0	2	0
Colne	2019–20	NPL Division One North West	2	0	2	0	—		—		4	0
Colne	2020–21	NPL Division One North West	8	7	2	0	—		2 (Note: Appearances in the FA Trophy)	0	12	7
Colne	2021–22	NPL Division One West	24	12	4	4	—		3	0	31	16
Colne	Total		34	19	8	4	0	0	5	0	47	23
Matlock Town	2021–22	NPL Premier Division	7	0	—		—		—		7	0
Career total			59	24	9	4	2	0	7	1	77	29
