= Max Hazeldine =

English footballer

Personal information
- Full name: Max Cameron Hazeldine
- Date of birth: 13 February 1997 (age 29)
- Place of birth: Stockport, England
- Position: Striker

Team information
- Current team: Trafford
- Number: 10

Youth career
- –2014: Accrington Stanley

Senior career*
Years	Team	Apps	(Gls)
2014–2016	Accrington Stanley	1	(0)
2015	→ Stockport County (loan)	3	(0)
2015–2016	→ Skelmersdale United (loan)	6	(0)
2016	→ Curzon Ashton (loan)	4	(0)
2016	Skelmersdale United		
2016–2017	Ramsbottom United		
2017–2018	Marine		
2018	Glossop North End		
2018–2019	Clitheroe	16	(11)
2019	Colne	8	(1)
2019–	Trafford	38	(16)
- * Club domestic league appearances and goals as of 22:12, 22 February 2023 (UTC)

Max Cameron Hazeldine (born 13 February 1997) is an English footballer who plays as a striker for Trafford.

== Career ==
In April 2015 Hazeldine was offered his first professional contract at Accrington Stanley having come through their youth system. He made his debut coming off the bench for Shay McCartan against Dagenham & Redbridge.

In January 2016, he joined Northern Premier League Premier Division side Skelmersdale United on an initial two-month loan deal. He signed for Marine on 23 November 2017.

Hazeldine signed for Marine on 25 November 2017. He then joined Northern Premier League Division One West side Clitheroe in July 2018 and made his debut against Accrington Stanley XI. He signed his contract on 17 November 2018. He joined Northern Premier League Division One North-West side Colne in the summer of 2019, being one of the clubs first signings. On 17 December 2019, he left the club by mutual consent. He then joined divisional rivals Trafford later in the month.

== Career statistics ==
As of match played 3 October 2015.

Club statistics
Club	Season	League			FA Cup		League Cup		Other		Total	
Club	Season	Division	Apps	Goals	Apps	Goals	Apps	Goals	Apps	Goals	Apps	Goals
Accrington Stanley	2013–14	League Two	0	0	0	0	0	0	0	0	0	0
Accrington Stanley	2014–15	League Two	1	0	0	0	0	0	0	0	1	0
Stockport County (loan)	2015–16	National League North	3	0	1	0	—		0	0	4	0
Skelmersdale United (loan)	2015–16	NPL Premier Division	6	0	—		—		—		6	0
Clitheroe	2018–19	NPL Division One West	16	11	0	0	—		0	0	16	11
Colne	2019–20	NPL Division One North-West	8	1	4	1	—		6 (Note: 4 appearances in the FA Trophy, 1 appearance in Northern Premier League Challenge Cup, 1 appearance and 2 goals in Lancashire FA Challenge Trophy)	2	18	4
Trafford	2019–20	NPL Division One North-West	11	4	—		—		3 (Note: 2 appearances and 1 goal in Northern Premier League Challenge Cup, 1 appearance and 3 goals in Manchester Premier Cup)	4	14	8
Trafford	2020–21	NPL Division One North-West	6	3	1	0	—		1 (Note: Appearance in FA Trophy)	0	8	3
Trafford	2021–22	NPL Division One West	13	8	0	0	—		0	0	13	8
Trafford	Total		30	15	1	0	—		4	4	35	19
Career total			64	27	6	1	0	0	10	6	80	34
