= Bob Cullingford =

English footballer

Personal information
- Full name: Robert Cullingford
- Date of birth: 3 December 1953 (age 72)
- Place of birth: Bradford, England
- Position: Defender

Youth career
- 1969–1972: Bradford City

Senior career*
Years	Team	Apps	(Gls)
1970–1972	Bradford City	2	(0)
- Morecambe
- * Club domestic league appearances and goals

Robert Cullingford (born 3 December 1953) is an English former professional footballer who played in defence.

He was born in Bradford and joined Bradford City's youth set up after being picked up from local leagues. He became the club's youngest player aged 16 years 141 days on 22 April 1970 in a Division Three game against Mansfield Town in a 1–0 defeat. He played just one more game two seasons later before he joined Morecambe.
