= 2024–25 Newport County A.F.C. season =

Welsh association football club season

Newport County
2024–25 season
- Owner: Huw Jenkins 52%, Newport County AFC Supporters Trust 27%, Other investors 21%
- Head Coach: Nelson Jardim (until 24 April 2025); Dafydd Williams (from 25 April 2025); David Hughes (from 23 May 2025)
- Stadium: Rodney Parade
- League Two: 22nd
- FA Cup: First round
- EFL Cup: First round
- EFL Trophy: Group stage
- Welsh League Cup: Group stage
- Top goalscorer: League: Bobby Kamwa (9); All: Bobby Kamwa (9)
- Highest home attendance: 5,465 v Tranmere Rovers (3 May 2025), EFL League 2
- Lowest home attendance: 697 v West Ham United Under-21s (17 September 2024), EFL Trophy Southern Group H
- Average home league attendance: 4,203
Home colours	Away colours	Third colours

The 2024–25 Newport County A.F.C. season was the club's 12th consecutive season in EFL League Two. Newport's 72nd season in the English Football League and 104th season of league football overall. They would also compete in the FA Cup, EFL Cup, EFL Trophy and Welsh League Cup.

On 16 July 2024 Nelson Jardim was appointed as Newport County Head Coach. Jardim left Newport County by mutual consent on 24 April 2025 with the club in 20th position in League Two and safe from relegation with two games to play of the 2024–25 season. Assistant head coach Dafydd Williams stepped up as head coach for those two matches. Newport finished the 2024–25 season in 22nd place in League Two. Williams left the club by mutual consent on 9 May 2025. On 23 May 2025 David Hughes was appointed Team Manager with Wayne Hatswell returning to the club as Assistant Manager.

== Transfers ==
=== In ===
Date	Pos.	Player	From	Fee	Ref.
28 June 2024	ST	Oliver Greaves (ENG)	Mickleover (ENG)	Undisclosed	
1 July 2024	CB	Matt Baker (WAL)	Stoke City (ENG)	Compensation	
1 July 2024 (Note: Transfer was announced on 25 June, and would become official on July 1 once his Sheffield Wednesday contract expired)	CB	Ciaran Brennan (IRL)	Sheffield Wednesday (ENG)	Free	
1 July 2024 (Note: Transfer was announced on 28 June, and would become official on July 1 once his Sunderland contract expired)	GK	Jacob Carney (ENG)	Sunderland (ENG)	Free	
1 July 2024 (Note: Transfer was announced on 24 June, and would become official on July 1 once his Grimsby Town contract expired)	LB	Anthony Glennon (ENG)	Grimsby Town (ENG)	Free	
1 July 2024 (Note: Transfer was announced on 26 June, and would become official on July 1 once his Swansea City contract expired)	RB	Joe Thomas (WAL)	Swansea City (WAL)	Free	
1 July 2024 (Note: Transfer was announced on 27 June, and would become official on July 1 once his Haverfordwest County contract expired)	CM	Kai Whitmore (WAL)	Haverfordwest County (WAL)	Free	
2 July 2024	LW	Michael Spellman (ENG)	Sunderland (ENG)	Free	
10 July 2024	CM	Cameron Antwi (ENG)	Cardiff City (WAL)	Undisclosed	
10 July 2024	CF	Courtney Baker-Richardson (ENG)	Crewe Alexandra (ENG)	Free	
26 July 2024	FB	Cameron Evans (WAL)	Taunton Town (ENG)	Free	
2 August 2024	LW	Bobby Kamwa (CMR)	Burton Albion (ENG)	Free	
8 August 2024	CF	Hamzad Kargbo (ENG)	Queens Park Rangers (ENG)	Free	
9 August 2024	CM	Dan Barton (WAL)	Cardiff City (WAL)	Undisclosed	
9 August 2024	CM	Amani Babah (ENG)	Cardiff City (WAL)	Undisclosed	
22 November 2024	FW	Geoffroy Bony (WAL)	Nice (FRA)	Free	
2 January 2025	GK	Lewis Webb (WAL)	Swansea City (WAL)	Free	
17 January 2025	LB	Thomas Davies (WAL)	Cardiff City (WAL)	Undisclosed	
22 January 2025	LW	Josh Martin (ENG)	Notts County (ENG)	Free	
31 January 2025	CB	Jaden Warner (ENG)	Norwich City (ENG)	Free	
4 February 2025	CM	Keenan Patten (WAL)	Barry Town United (WAL)	Undisclosed	

=== Out ===
Date	Pos.	Player	To	Fee	Ref.
6 August 2024	CF	Will Evans (WAL)	Mansfield Town (ENG)	Undisclosed	
1 January 2025 (Note: The transfer was announced on 31 December, and would become official on 1 January once the transfer window re-opened.)	DM	Bryn Morris (ENG)	Harrogate Town (ENG)	Undisclosed	
30 June 2025	GK	(Wales) Lewis Webb (WAL)	Released	Free	
30 June 2025	DF	Kyle Jameson (ENG)	Released	Free	
30 June 2025	DF	Josh Seberry (IRL)	Released	Free	
30 June 2025	MF	Josh Martin (ENG)	Released	Free	
30 June 2025	MF	Nathan Wood (WAL)	Penybont (WAL)	Free	
30 June 2025	MF	(Wales) Dan Barton (WAL)	Released	Free	
30 June 2025	CF	Hamzad Kargbo (ENG)	Released	Free	
30 June 2025	CF	Luke Jephcott (WAL)	Truro City (ENG)	Free	
30 June 2025	FW	Geoffroy Bony (WAL)	Released	Free	
30 June 2025	FW	Kiban Rai (WAL)	Aldershot Town (ENG)	Free	
30 June 2025	GK	Nick Townsend (ATG)	Eastleigh (ENG)	Free	
30 June 2025	MF	Aaron Wildig (ENG)	Gloucester City (ENG)	Free	
30 June 2025	DF	Shane McLoughlin (IRL)	Cambridge United (ENG)	Free	

=== Loaned in ===
Date	Pos.	Player	From	Date until	Ref.
23 August 2024	AM	Kieron Evans (WAL)	Cardiff City (WAL)	End of Season	
29 August 2024	DM	Noah Mawene (ENG)	Preston North End (ENG)	End of Season	
29 August 2024	CM	Jamie Miley (ENG)	Newcastle United (ENG)	13 January 2025 (Note: On 13 January, Miley was recalled back to his parent club Newcastle)	
30 August 2024	CF	Kyle Hudlin (ENG)	Huddersfield Town (ENG)	End of Season	
16 January 2025	RW	David Ajiboye (ENG)	Peterborough United (ENG)	End of Season	

=== Loaned out ===
Date	Pos.	Player	To	Date until	Ref.
31 August 2024	AM	Nathan Wood (WAL)	Penybont (WAL)	End of Season	
3 January 2025	AM	Jac Norris (WAL)	Briton Ferry Llansawel (WAL)	End of Season	
3 January 2025	CB	Nelson Sanca (POR)	Briton Ferry Llansawel (WAL)	End of Season	
9 January 2025	CB	Josh Seberry (IRL)	Weston-super-Mare (ENG)	End of Season	
20 January 2025	CF	Hamzad Kargbo (ENG)	Chippenham Town (ENG)	End of Season	
30 January 2025	LW	Kiban Rai (WAL)	Merthyr Town (WAL)	End of Season	
1 February 2025	MF	(Wales) Dan Barton (WAL)	Cardiff Metropolitan University (WAL)	End of Season	
4 February 2025	CF	Luke Jephcott (WAL)	Truro City (ENG)	End of Season	

== Pre-season and friendlies ==
On 30 May, County announced their first pre-season friendly, against Kidderminster Harriers. Five days later, a second friendly fixture was confirmed, against Bristol City. A third was added a further day later, versus Barry Town United. A fourth was added against Undy. On 28 June, an additional two pre-season friendlies were added to finalise the plans, against Pontypridd United and Hereford.

Win Draw Loss Fixtures

13 July 2024 Friendly	Undy	1–4	Newport County	Undy
13:00 BST (UTC+1)	Thomas 74' (pen.)	Report	Spellman 21'; Baker-Richardson 61'; Rai 70'; Jephcott 72'	Stadium: The Causeway

16 July 2024 Friendly	Pontypridd United	0–2	Newport County	Pontypridd
19:30 BST (UTC+1)		Report	Morris 21'; Antwi 61'	Stadium: USW Sports Park

20 July 2024 Friendly	Barry Town United	2–1	Newport County	Barry
14:30 BST (UTC+1)	McLaggon 23'; Lewis 58'	Report	Wildig 15'	Stadium: Jenner Park Stadium

23 July 2024 Friendly	Bristol City	2–0	Newport County	Failand
12:00 BST (UTC+1)	Wells 69'; Armstrong 90'	Report		Stadium: Robins High Performance Centre; Attendance: 0 (behind closed doors)

27 July 2024 Friendly	Kidderminster Harriers	2–0	Newport County	Kidderminster
14:00 BST (UTC+1)	Hemmings 22' (pen.); Trialist 63'	Report		Stadium: Aggborough Stadium

30 July 2024 Friendly	Bristol Rovers XI	0–2	Newport County	Almondsbury
13:00 BST (UTC+1)		Report	Own goal Baker-Richardson 10'	Stadium: Quarters Training Centre; Attendance: 0 (behind closed doors)

3 August 2024 Friendly	Hereford	0–0	Newport County	Hereford
15:00 BST (UTC+1)		Report		Stadium: Edgar Street

== Competitions ==
=== League Two ===
==== League table ====
Pos	Team	Pld	W	D	L	GF	GA	GD	Pts	Promotion, qualification or relegation
20	Tranmere Rovers	46	12	15	19	45	65	−20	51	
21	Accrington Stanley	46	12	14	20	53	69	−16	50	
22	Newport County	46	13	10	23	52	76	−24	49	
23	Carlisle United (R)	46	10	12	24	44	71	−27	42	Relegation to National League
24	Morecambe (R)	46	10	6	30	40	72	−32	36	Relegation to National League

Source: EFL Official Website
Rules for classification: 1) Points; 2) Goal difference; 3) Number of goals scored; 4) Head-to-head results; 5) Wins; 6) Away goals; 7) Penalty points (sec 9.5); 8) 12-point sending off offences
(R) Relegated

==== Results summary ====
Overall								Home						Away					
Pld	W	D	L	GF	GA	GD	Pts	W	D	L	GF	GA	GD	W	D	L	GF	GA	GD
46	13	10	23	52	76	−24	49	10	5	8	32	32	0	3	5	15	20	44	−24

Last updated: 3 May 2025.
Source: Soccerway

==== Results by round ====
Round	1	2	3	4	5	6	7	8	9	10	11	12	13	14	15	16	17	18	20	21	22	23	24	27	28	29	30	25^{2}	31	19^{1}	32	33	34	35	36	26^{3}	37	38	39	40	41	42	43	44	45	46
Ground	A	H	H	A	H	A	A	H	H	A	A	H	A	H	A	H	A	A	A	H	A	A	H	A	H	A	H	H	A	H	H	H	A	H	A	A	H	A	H	H	A	H	A	H	A	H
Result	L	W	W	W	L	L	L	W	W	L	L	L	W	D	L	D	D	D	D	W	L	L	L	L	L	D	W	W	W	W	D	L	L	W	L	L	W	L	L	D	L	L	D	D	L	L
Position	15	8	5	4	8	10	13	12	9	10	13	15	13	14	15	15	16	16	16	16	18	18	18	20	20	21	19	17	17	14	15	16	16	15	17	17	16	16	18	17	17	18	18	20	21	22

Source: EFL
A = Away; H = Home; W = Win; D = Draw; L = Loss; P = Postponed
Notes:
- ^{1} Matchday 19 (vs. Carlisle United) was postponed due to spectator and player safety concerns from Storm Darragh.
- ^{2} Matchday 25 (vs. Morecambe) was postponed due to frozen pitch.
- ^{3} Matchday 26 (vs. Accrington Stanley) was postponed due to FA Cup involvements.

==== Matches ====
On 26 June, the League Two fixtures were announced.

Win Draw Loss Fixtures

10 August 2024 1	Cheltenham Town	3–2	Newport County	Cheltenham
15:00 BST (UTC+1)	Colwill 22', 90+6'; Dulson 27'	Report	Baker-Richardson 31' (pen.); Greaves 43'	Stadium: Whaddon Road; Attendance: 4,613; Referee: Ruebyn Ricardo

17 August 2024 2	Newport County	3–1	Doncaster Rovers	Newport
15:00 BST (UTC+1)	Kamwa 47'; Whitmore 66'; Baker 69'	Report	Bailey 30'	Stadium: Rodney Parade; Attendance: 4,755; Referee: Scott Simpson

24 August 2024 3	Newport County	3–1	Accrington Stanley	Newport
15:00 BST (UTC+1)	Quirk 12' (o.g.); Baker-Richardson 53' (pen.); Wildig 62'	Report	Whalley 38'	Stadium: Rodney Parade; Attendance: 4,437; Referee: Aaron Bannister

31 August 2024 4	Morecambe	0–1	Newport County	Morecambe
15:00 BST (UTC+1)		Report	Wildig 9'	Stadium: Mazuma Mobile Stadium; Attendance: 2,724; Referee: Declan Bourne

7 September 2024 5	Newport County	1–4	Port Vale	Newport
15:00 BST (UTC+1)	Wildig 24'	Report	Stockley 6', 36'; Chislett 48'; Tolaj 54'	Stadium: Rodney Parade; Attendance: 4,851; Referee: Stephen Parkinson

14 September 2024 6	Swindon Town	4–0	Newport County	Swindon
12:30 BST (UTC+1)	Tshimanga 4'; Glatzel 18'; Baker 21' (o.g.); Cotterill 45'	Report		Stadium: County Ground; Attendance: 6,857; Referee: Nigel Eady
Note: Fixture was initially scheduled for a 15:00 kick-off, but was moved for live Sky Sports broadcast.

21 September 2024 7	Barrow	2–0	Newport County	Barrow-in-Furness
15:00 BST (UTC+1)	Newby 27'; Jackson 82'	Report		Stadium: Holker Street; Attendance: 3,434; Referee: Elliot Bell

28 September 2024 8	Newport County	2–1	Crewe Alexandra	Newport
15:00 BST (UTC+1)	C.Evans 33'; Baker 74'	Report	Thibaut 71'	Stadium: Rodney Parade; Attendance: 4,273; Referee: Alan Young

1 October 2024 9	Newport County	3–1	Salford City	Newport
19:45 BST (UTC+1)	Hudlin 10'; Wildig 26'; Spellman 67'	Report	Stockton 81'	Stadium: Rodney Parade; Attendance: 3,552; Referee: Scott Jackson

7 October 2024 10	Bradford City	3–1	Newport County	Bradford
20:00 BST (UTC+1)	Cook 39'; Walker 75'; Pointon 85'	Report	Hudlin 65'	Stadium: Valley Parade; Attendance: 15,542; Referee: Ben Toner
Note: Fixture was initially scheduled for 5 October, but was moved for live Sky Sports broadcast.

14 October 2024 11	Harrogate Town	1–0	Newport County	Harrogate
15:00 BST (UTC+1)	Sims 40'	Report		Stadium: Wetherby Road; Attendance: 2,564; Referee: Declan Bourne

18 October 2024 12	Newport County	0–3	Chesterfield	Newport
20:00 BST (UTC+1)		Report	Markanday 1'; Grigg 84', 87'	Stadium: Rodney Parade; Attendance: 4,570; Referee: Thomas Parsons
Note: Fixture was initially scheduled for 19 October, but was moved for live Sky Sports broadcast.

22 October 2024 13	Gillingham	0–2	Newport County	Gillingham
19:45 BST (UTC+1)		Report	Baker 16'; Hudlin 33'	Stadium: Priestfield Stadium; Attendance: 5,262; Referee: Farai Hallam

26 October 2024 14	Newport County	0–0	Fleetwood Town	Newport
15:00 BST (UTC+1)		Report		Stadium: Rodney Parade; Attendance: 4,244; Referee: David Rock

9 November 2024 15	Tranmere Rovers	2–1	Newport County	Birkenhead
15:00 UTC	Jennings 41'; Morris 58'	Report	Hudlin 84'	Stadium: Prenton Park; Attendance: 5,805; Referee: Martin Coy

16 November 2024 16	Newport County	0–0	Grimsby Town	Newport
15:00 UTC		Report		Stadium: Rodney Parade; Attendance: 4,298; Referee: James Oldham

23 November 2024 17	Notts County	0–0	Newport County	Nottingham
12:30 UTC		Report		Stadium: Meadow Lane; Attendance: 9,408; Referee: Adam Herczeg
Note: Fixture was initially scheduled for a 15:00 kick-off, but was moved for live Sky Sports broadcast.

3 December 2024 18	Wimbledon	2–2	Newport County	Wimbledon, London
19:45 UTC	Smith 12'; Stevens 20'	Report	Spellman 26'; McLoughlin 90+7' (pen.)	Stadium: Plough Lane; Attendance: 6,519; Referee: Lee Swabey

14 December 2024 20	Colchester United	0–0	Newport County	Colchester
15:00 UTC		Report		Stadium: Colchester Community Stadium; Attendance: 4,046; Referee: Scott Jackson

21 December 2024 21	Newport County	6–3	Milton Keynes Dons	Newport
15:00 UTC	Morris 12', 16', 36' (pen.); Kamwa 23', 47', 81'	Report	Offord 45+4', 75'; White 71'	Stadium: Rodney Parade; Attendance: 4,382; Referee: Simon Mather

26 December 2024 22	Bromley	5–2	Newport County	Bromley
15:00 UTC	Sowunmi 27'; Reynolds 35'; Cheek 53'; Arthurs 70'; Thompson 90+3'	Report	K.Evans 72'; Whitmore 79'	Stadium: Hayes Lane; Attendance: 3,320; Referee: Sunny Sukhvir Gill

29 December 2024 23	Walsall	2–0	Newport County	Walsall
15:00 UTC	Lowe 73', 90+5'	Report		Stadium: Bescot Stadium; Attendance: 6,707; Referee: Carl Brook

2 January 2025 24	Newport County	1–2	Wimbledon	Newport
19:45 UTC	Greaves 90+2'	Report	Kelly 49'; Sawyers 77'	Stadium: Rodney Parade; Attendance: 4,405; Referee: Will Finnie
Note: Fixture was initially scheduled for 1 January, but was moved following agreement from both teams.

18 January 2025 27	Port Vale	3–2	Newport County	Stoke-on-Trent
15:00 UTC	Garrity 29'; Stockley 62'; Headley 77'	Report	Kamwa 12'; C.Evans 33'	Stadium: Vale Park; Attendance: 6,354; Referee: Stephen Parkinson

24 January 2025 28	Newport County	1–2	Swindon Town	Newport
19:45 UTC	Hudlin 12'	Report	Smith 15'; Westley 75'	Stadium: Rodney Parade; Attendance: 5,244; Referee: Ben Speedie
Note: Fixture was initially scheduled for 25 January, but was moved following agreement from both teams.

28 January 2025 29	Salford City	1–1	Newport County	Salford
19:45 UTC	Adelakun 31' (pen.)	Report	McLoughlin 11' (pen.)	Stadium: Moor Lane; Attendance: 1,952; Referee: Scott Simpson

1 February 2025 30	Newport County	1–0	Barrow	Newport
15:00 UTC	Cameron 70' (o.g.)	Report		Stadium: Rodney Parade; Attendance: 3,989; Referee: Scott Tallis

4 February 2025 25	Newport County	2–1	Morecambe	Newport
19:45 UTC	Thomas 8'; Ajiboye 82'	Report	Edwards 79'	Stadium: Rodney Parade; Attendance: 3,766; Referee: Carl Brook
Note: Fixture was initially scheduled for 4 January, but was moved due to Newport playing the Thursday prior. The match was then postponed on that date due to a frozen pitch.

8 February 2025 31	Crewe Alexandra	0–3	Newport County	Crewe
15:00 UTC		Report	Antwi 33'; Ajiboye 45+2'; Baker-Richardson 82'	Stadium: Gresty Road; Attendance: 4,472; Referee: James Oldham

11 February 2025 19	Newport County	1–0	Carlisle United	Newport
19:45 UTC	Hudlin 76'	Report		Stadium: Rodney Parade; Attendance: 3,721; Referee: Paul Howard
Note: Fixture was originally scheduled for 7 December, but was postponed due to safety concerns from Storm Darragh.

15 February 2025 32	Newport County	0–0	Bradford City	Newport
15:00 UTC		Report		Stadium: Rodney Parade; Attendance: 4,031; Referee: Andrew Humphries

22 February 2025 33	Newport County	0–3	Cheltenham Town	Newport
15:00 UTC		Report	Taylor 30'; Williams 53'; Archer 82'	Stadium: Rodney Parade; Attendance: 4,257; Referee: Jeremy Simpson

1 March 2025 34	Doncaster Rovers	3–0	Newport County	Doncaster
15:00 UTC	Street 34', 46'; Molyneux 78'	Report		Stadium: Eco-Power Stadium; Attendance: 8,007; Referee: Darren Drysdale

4 March 2025 35	Newport County	3–1	Gillingham	Newport
19:45 UTC	Kamwa 9', 27', 30'	Report	Morgan 69'	Stadium: Rodney Parade; Attendance: 3,396; Referee: Aaron Bannister

8 March 2025 36	Chesterfield	2–1	Newport County	Chesterfield
15:00 UTC	Banks 42'; Pepple 44'	Report	Baker 40'	Stadium: SMH Group Stadium; Attendance: 7,692; Referee: Michael Barlow

11 March 2025 26	Accrington Stanley	5–0	Newport County	Accrington
19:45 UTC	O'Brien-Whitmarsh 4', 53'; Mooney 15', 75'; Walton 26'	Report		Stadium: Crown Ground; Attendance: 1,503; Referee: Ross Joyce
Note: Fixture was initially scheduled for 11 January, but was rearranged due to Accrington's FA Cup involvements.

15 March 2025 37	Newport County	3–0	Harrogate Town	Newport
15:00 UTC	C.Evans 2'; Baker-Richardson 15'; Clarke 61'	Report		Stadium: Rodney Parade; Attendance: 3,756; Referee: Jamie O'Connor

22 March 2025 38	Grimsby Town	1–0	Newport County	Cleethorpes
15:00 UTC	McEachran 64'	Report		Stadium: Blundell Park; Attendance: 5,339; Referee: Alan Young

29 March 2025 39	Newport County	0–2	Notts County	Newport
15:00 UTC		Report	Whitaker 6'; McGoldrick 63'	Stadium: Rodney Parade; Attendance: 3,962; Referee: Stuart Morland

1 April 2025 40	Newport County	1–1	Bromley	Newport
19:45 BST (UTC+1)	C.Evans 32'	Report	Cheek 72'	Stadium: Rodney Parade; Attendance: 3,326; Referee: Robert Massey-Ellis

5 April 2025 41	Carlisle United	3–2	Newport County	Carlisle
15:00 BST (UTC+1)	Kelly 33', 59'; Hayden 84'	Report	K.Evans 26'; Kamwa 28'	Stadium: Brunton Park; Attendance: 5,889; Referee: Ruebyn Ricardo

12 April 2025 42	Newport County	0–2	Colchester United	Newport
15:00 BST (UTC+1)		Report	Kelleher 88'; Scully 90+4'	Stadium: Rodney Parade; Attendance: 3,899; Referee: Richard Eley

18 April 2025 43	Milton Keynes Dons	0–0	Newport County	Milton Keynes
15:00 BST (UTC+1)		Report		Stadium: Stadium MK; Attendance: 8,135; Referee: Abigail Byrne

21 April 2025 44	Newport County	0–0	Walsall	Newport
12:30 BST (UTC+1)		Report		Stadium: Rodney Parade; Attendance: 4,578; Referee: Sam Purkiss
Note: Fixture was initially scheduled for a 15:00 kick-off, but was moved for live Sky Sports broadcasting.

26 April 2025 45	Fleetwood Town	2–0	Newport County	Fleetwood
15:00 BST (UTC+1)	Patterson 52'; Medley 74'	Report		Stadium: Highbury Stadium; Attendance: 2,469; Referee: Peter Wright

3 May 2025 46	Newport County	1–4	Tranmere Rovers	Newport
15:00 BST (UTC+1)	McLoughlin 23'	Report	Garrett 41'; Dennis 48'; Patrick 70'; Davison 78'	Stadium: Rodney Parade; Attendance: Andrew Humphries; Referee: 5,465

=== FA Cup ===
Newport County were drawn at home to Peterborough United in the first round.

Win Draw Loss Fixtures

2 November 2024 First round	Newport County	2–4	Peterborough United	Newport
15:00 UTC	Glennon 5'; Whitmore 7'	Report	Odoh 27'; Randall 71'; Jones 89', 90+3'	Stadium: Rodney Parade; Attendance: 2,941; Referee: Stephen Martin

=== EFL Cup ===
On 27 June, the draw for the first round was made, with Newport being drawn away against Leyton Orient.

Win Draw Loss Fixtures

13 August 2024 First round	Leyton Orient	4–1	Newport County	Leyton, London
19:30 BST (UTC+1)	Agyei 1'; Jaiyesimi 45+7'; Cooper 51'; Kelman 74'	Report	Clarke 61'	Stadium: Brisbane Road; Attendance: 2,141; Referee: Craig Hicks
Note: Live on Sky Sports

=== EFL Trophy ===
In the group stage, Newport were drawn into Southern Group H alongside Cheltenham Town, Reading and West Ham United.

Pos	Div	Team	Pld	W	PW	PL	L	GF	GA	GD	Pts	Qualification
1	L2	Cheltenham Town	3	3	0	0	0	6	2	+4	9	Advance to Round 2
2	L1	Reading	3	2	0	0	1	6	2	+4	6	Advance to Round 2
3	L2	Newport County	3	1	0	0	2	2	5	−3	3	
4	ACA	West Ham United U21	3	0	0	0	3	2	7	−5	0	

Source: EFL

Win Draw Loss Fixtures

3 September 2024 Group stage	Newport County	1–2	Cheltenham Town	Newport
19:00 BST (UTC+1)	K.Evans 33'	Report	Sohna 67'; Colwill 75'	Stadium: Rodney Parade; Attendance: 1,051; Referee: Matthew Russell

17 September 2024 Group stage	Newport County	1–0	West Ham United U21	Newport
19:00 BST (UTC+1)	Greaves 83'	Report		Stadium: Rodney Parade; Attendance: 697; Referee: Oliver Mackey

12 November 2024 Group stage	Reading	3–0	Newport County	Reading
19:00 UTC	Knibbs 73', 87'; Wareham 75'	Report		Stadium: Madejski Stadium; Attendance: 1,870; Referee: Sam Mulhall

=== Welsh League Cup ===
The Welsh League Cup sponsored by Nathaniel MG includes 44 Cymru Premier, Cymru North and Cymru South clubs plus Newport County, Cardiff City and Swansea City as wildcard entries for the 2024–25 season.

Win Draw Loss Fixtures

20 July 2024 Northern Section first round	Llandudno	3–0	Newport County	Llandudno
15:00 BST (UTC+1)		Report		Stadium: Maesdu Park

== Statistics ==
=== Appearances and goals ===
As of match played 21 April 2025

Players with no appearances are not included on the list
Italics indicate a loaned in player

No.	Pos	Nat	Player	Total		League Two		FA Cup		EFL Cup		EFL Trophy	
No.	Pos	Nat	Player	Apps	Goals	Apps	Goals	Apps	Goals	Apps	Goals	Apps	Goals
1	GK	(Antigua and Barbuda) ANT	Nick Townsend	44	0	41+0	0	1+0	0	0+0	0	1+1	0
3	DF	(England) ENG	Anthony Glennon	41	1	32+5	0	1+0	1	1+0	0	2+0	0
4	DF	(Wales) WAL	Matt Baker	44	4	39+0	4	1+0	0	1+0	0	3+0	0
5	DF	(England) ENG	James Clarke	26	2	24+0	1	0+0	0	0+1	1	0+1	0
6	DF	(Republic of Ireland) IRL	Ciarán Brennan	31	0	26+1	0	1+0	0	1+0	0	1+1	0
7	FW	(Cameroon) CMR	Bobby Kamwa	47	9	40+2	9	0+1	0	0+1	0	2+1	0
8	FW	(England) ENG	Josh Martin	15	0	6+9	0	0+0	0	0+0	0	0+0	0
9	FW	(England) ENG	Courtney Baker-Richardson	39	4	23+12	4	1+0	0	0+1	0	1+1	0
10	FW	(England) ENG	Oliver Greaves	17	3	4+10	2	0+0	0	0+0	0	2+1	1
11	MF	(England) ENG	Cameron Antwi	40	1	28+9	1	0+0	0	0+1	0	0+2	0
12	DF	(Wales) WAL	Joe Thomas	22	1	19+2	1	0+0	0	0+0	0	1+0	0
13	GK	(England) ENG	Jacob Carney	6	0	3+0	0	0+0	0	1+0	0	2+0	0
14	MF	(Wales) WAL	Kai Whitmore	29	3	13+13	2	1+0	1	1+0	0	1+0	0
17	MF	(Wales) WAL	Kieron Evans	37	3	20+13	2	1+0	0	0+0	0	3+0	1
18	FW	(Wales) WAL	Kiban Rai	6	0	1+3	0	0+0	0	1+0	0	1+0	0
19	DF	(Republic of Ireland) IRL	Shane McLoughlin	37	2	32+2	2	0+0	0	1+0	0	2+0	0
21	FW	(England) ENG	Michael Spellman	31	2	12+18	2	0+0	0	0+0	0	0+1	0
22	MF	(Wales) WAL	Nathan Wood	2	0	0+1	0	0+0	0	1+0	0	0+0	0
23	DF	(England) ENG	Kyle Jameson	27	0	13+9	0	1+0	0	1+0	0	3+0	0
24	MF	(England) ENG	Aaron Wildig	17	4	15+0	4	0+0	0	1+0	0	1+0	0
25	FW	(England) ENG	Kyle Hudlin	28	6	15+10	6	1+0	0	0+0	0	1+1	0
26	DF	(Wales) WAL	Cameron Evans	34	4	26+4	4	1+0	0	0+1	0	1+1	0
27	FW	(England) ENG	Hamzad Kargbo	2	0	0+2	0	0+0	0	0+0	0	0+0	0
28	DF	(Wales) WAL	Tom Davies	3	0	2+1	0	0+0	0	0+0	0	0+0	0
29	DF	(Portugal) POR	Nelson Sanca	2	0	0+1	0	0+0	0	0+0	0	0+1	0
30	MF	(England) ENG	Noah Mawene	16	0	4+10	0	0+0	0	0+0	0	1+1	0
31	FW	(Wales) WAL	Luke Jephcott	16	0	2+10	0	0+1	0	1+0	0	2+0	0
32	DF	(England) ENG	Jaden Warner	5	0	3+2	0	0+0	0	0+0	0	0+0	0
37	FW	(Wales) WAL	Geoffroy Bony	6	0	2+4	0	0+0	0	0+0	0	0+0	0
38	MF	(Wales) WAL	Keenan Patten	4	0	1+3	0	0+0	0	0+0	0	0+0	0
44	FW	(England) ENG	David Ajiboye	20	2	16+4	2	0+0	0	0+0	0	0+0	0
Player(s) who featured whilst on loan but returned to parent club during the season:
16	MF	(England) ENG	Jamie Miley	8	0	3+3	0	1+0	0	0+0	0	1+0	0
Player(s) who featured but departed the club permanently during the season:
8	MF	(England) ENG	Bryn Morris	20	3	18+0	3	0+0	0	0+0	0	1+1	0
