= 2023–24 Newport County A.F.C. season =

Welsh association football club season

Newport County
2023–24 season
- Owner: Newport County AFC Supporters' Trust (until 23 January 2024). Huw Jenkins (52% from 24 January 2024)
- Chairman: Vacant until 23 January 2024. Huw Jenkins from 24 January 2024
- Manager: Graham Coughlan until 20 June 2024
- Stadium: Rodney Parade
- League Two: 18th
- FA Cup: Fourth round
- EFL Cup: Second round
- EFL Trophy: Group stage
- Top goalscorer: League: Will Evans (21); All: Will Evans (25)
- Highest home attendance: 9,537 v Wrexham (20 January 2024), EFL League Two
- Lowest home attendance: 800 v West Ham United U21s (31 October 2023), EFL Trophy Southern Group H
- Average home league attendance: 4,336
Home colours	Away colours	Third colours

The 2023–24 Newport County A.F.C. season is the club's 11th consecutive season in EFL League Two. Newport's 71st season in the English Football League and 103rd season of league football overall. They also competed in the FA Cup, EFL Cup and EFL Trophy.

Newport County reached the second round of the 2023–24 EFL Cup, losing on penalties to Brentford of the Premier League after drawing 1–1 in normal time.

In October 2023 Newport County Supporters Trust members voted by a 98% majority in favour of selling a controlling interest 52% of shares in the club to former Swansea City chairman Huw Jenkins, subject to EFL approval. The Supporters Trust retained 27% of shares and other previous investors retained 21%. The takeover was confirmed as completed by EFL and the supporters trust on 24 January 2024 with Newport in 14th place in League Two.

Newport County reached the fourth round of the 2023–24 FA Cup, losing 4–2 to Manchester United of the Premier League.

Newport finished the season in 18th place in League Two. On 20 June 2024, team manager Graham Coughlan departed the club by mutual consent.

== Current squad ==
As of 9 April 2024

No.	Name	Position	Nationality	Place of birth	Date of birth (age)	Previous club	Date signed	Fee	Contract end
Goalkeepers
1	Nick Townsend	GK	(Antigua and Barbuda)	(England) Solihull	1 November 1994 (age 32)	Barnsley	4 August 2018	Free	30 June 2025
26	Jonny Maxted	GK	(England)	Tadcaster	26 October 1993 (age 33)	Northampton Town	28 July 2023	Free	30 June 2025
Defenders
2	Lewis Payne	RB	(England)		30 May 2004 (age 22)	Southampton	11 August 2023	Loan	31 May 2024
3	Adam Lewis	LB	(England)	Liverpool	8 November 1999 (age 27)	Liverpool	28 July 2023	Loan	31 May 2024
4	Ryan Delaney	CB	(Republic of Ireland)	Wexford	6 September 1996 (age 30)	Morecambe	21 July 2023	Free	30 June 2024
5	James Clarke	CB	(England)	Aylesbury	17 November 1989 (age 36)	Walsall	1 July 2021	Free	30 June 2025
6	Declan Drysdale	CB	(England)	Birkenhead	14 November 1999 (age 26)	Coventry City	1 July 2022	Undisclosed	30 June 2024
14	Harrison Bright	RB	(Wales)	Blaenavon	23 February 2004 (age 22)	Academy	10 August 2020	Trainee	30 June 2024
15	Josh Seberry	CB	(Republic of Ireland)	(England) London	9 January 2005 (age 21)	Shelbourne	24 July 2023	Undisclosed	30 June 2025
19	Shane McLoughlin	RB	(Republic of Ireland)	(United States) The Bronx	1 March 1997 (age 29)	Salford City	10 July 2023	Free	30 June 2025
23	Kyle Jameson	CB	(England)	Urmston	11 September 1998 (age 28)	Tranmere Rovers	1 July 2023	Free	30 June 2025
28	Matt Baker	CB	(Wales)	(England) Kent	6 February 2003 (age 23)	Stoke City	1 September 2023	Loan	31 May 2024
33	Matty Bondswell	LB	(England)	Nottingham	18 April 2002 (age 24)	Newcastle United	1 July 2023	Loan	31 May 2024
41	Nelson Sanca	CB	(Portugal)	Lisbon	10 October 2006 (age 20)	Academy	16 January 2024	Trainee	30 June 2024
Midfielders
8	Bryn Morris	DM	(England)	Hartlepool	25 April 1996 (age 30)	Grimsby Town	1 July 2023	Free	30 June 2025
11	James Waite	AM	(Wales)	Sebastopol	11 May 1999 (age 27)	Penybont	12 January 2022	Free	30 June 2024
17	Scot Bennett	DM	(England)	Newquay	30 November 1990 (age 35)	Notts County	1 July 2016	Free	30 June 2024
20	Harry Charsley	CM	(Republic of Ireland)	(England) Wirral	1 November 1996 (age 30)	Port Vale	17 January 2023	Free	30 June 2024
24	Aaron Wildig	CM	(England)	Hereford	15 April 1992 (age 34)	Morecambe	1 July 2022	Free	30 June 2024
34	Jac Norris	CM	(Wales)		9 November 2006 (age 20)	Academy	1 July 2023	Trainee	30 June 2024
Forwards
7	Will Evans	CF	(Wales)	Llangedwyn	1 July 1997 (age 29)	Bala Town	1 July 2022	Undisclosed	30 June 2024
9	Omar Bogle	CF	(England)	Sandwell	26 July 1993 (age 33)	Hartlepool United	1 July 2022	Undisclosed	30 June 2024
10	Offrande Zanzala	CF	(Republic of the Congo)	Brazzaville	8 November 1996 (age 30)	Barrow	1 July 2022	Free	30 June 2024
18	Kiban Rai	CF	(Wales)	Brecon	28 May 2005 (age 21)	Academy	1 July 2023	Trainee	30 June 2024
30	Seb Palmer-Houlden	CF	(England)	Bristol	12 May 2004 (age 22)	Bristol City	20 July 2023	Loan	31 May 2024
31	Luke Jephcott	CF	(Wales)	Aberystwyth	26 January 2000 (age 26)	St Johnstone	25 January 2024	Free	30 June 2025
Out on Loan
13	Joe Day	GK	(England)	Brighton	13 August 1990 (age 36)	Cardiff City	1 July 2021	Free	30 June 2024
16	Sam Bowen	CM	(Wales)		14 January 2001 (age 25)	Cardiff City	1 July 2022	Undisclosed	30 June 2024
22	Nathan Wood	LW	(Wales)	Newport	23 April 1997 (age 29)	Penybont	1 July 2023	Free	30 June 2025

== Statistics ==
As of 27 April 2024
Players with names in italics and marked * were on loan from another club.

No.	Pos	Nat	Player	Total		League Two		FA Cup		EFL Cup		EFL Trophy	
No.	Pos	Nat	Player	Apps	Goals	Apps	Goals	Apps	Goals	Apps	Goals	Apps	Goals
1	GK	(Antigua and Barbuda) ANT	Nick Townsend	52	0	43+0	0	6+0	0	1+0	0	2+0	0
2	DF	(England) ENG	Lewis Payne*	42	2	20+12	1	3+3	1	0+1	0	3+0	0
3	DF	(England) ENG	Adam Lewis*	30	2	25+1	2	2+0	0	1+1	0	0+0	0
4	DF	(Republic of Ireland) IRL	Ryan Delaney	41	1	30+0	1	6+0	0	2+0	0	3+0	0
5	DF	(England) ENG	James Clarke	32	2	24+1	0	5+0	2	1+0	0	0+1	0
6	DF	(England) ENG	Declan Drysdale	14	0	5+7	0	1+0	0	0+0	0	0+1	0
7	FW	(Wales) WAL	Will Evans	55	24	44+2	21	5+0	1	1+0	1	2+1	1
8	MF	(England) ENG	Bryn Morris	58	7	46+0	7	6+0	0	2+0	0	3+1	0
9	FW	(England) ENG	Omar Bogle	31	8	22+3	7	3+0	1	1+0	0	1+1	0
10	FW	(Republic of the Congo) CGO	Offrande Zanzala	17	3	6+11	3	0+0	0	0+0	0	0+0	0
11	MF	(Wales) WAL	James Waite	35	0	9+18	0	0+3	0	2+0	0	2+1	0
14	DF	(Wales) WAL	Harrison Bright	11	0	6+4	0	0+0	0	0+1	0	0+0	0
15	DF	(Republic of Ireland) IRL	Josh Seberry	12	0	4+5	0	0+0	0	2+0	0	1+0	0
17	MF	(England) ENG	Scot Bennett	56	0	44+1	0	6+0	0	1+1	0	3+0	0
18	FW	(Wales) WAL	Kiban Rai	19	1	1+12	0	0+2	0	0+2	1	2+0	0
19	DF	(Republic of Ireland) IRL	Shane McLoughlin	43	6	32+2	3	6+0	3	0+1	0	2+0	0
20	MF	(Republic of Ireland) IRL	Harry Charsley	39	5	22+10	5	3+2	0	2+0	0	0+0	0
21	FW	(England) ENG	Olly Thomas*	9	0	0+8	0	0+0	0	0+0	0	1+0	0
22	MF	(Wales) WAL	Nathan Wood	18	1	3+9	0	0+2	0	0+1	0	3+0	1
23	DF	(England) ENG	Kyle Jameson	19	1	16+2	1	0+0	0	1+0	0	0+0	0
24	MF	(England) ENG	Aaron Wildig	41	4	29+2	2	4+2	1	2+0	1	1+1	0
26	GK	(England) ENG	Jonny Maxted	6	0	3+1	0	0+0	0	1+0	0	1+0	0
28	DF	(Wales) WAL	Matt Baker*	38	0	29+2	0	4+1	0	0+0	0	1+1	0
30	FW	(England) ENG	Seb Palmer-Houlden*	42	9	25+9	7	5+0	1	1+1	1	0+1	0
31	FW	(Wales) WAL	Luke Jephcott*	16	0	5+11	0	0+0	0	0+0	0	0+0	0
33	DF	(England) ENG	Matty Bondswell*	39	0	9+22	0	1+2	0	1+1	0	2+1	0
34	MF	(Wales) WAL	Jac Norris	3	0	0+3	0	0+0	0	0+0	0	0+0	0
41	DF	(Portugal) POR	Nelson Sanca	3	0	3+0	0	0+0	0	0+0	0	0+0	0

=== Goals record ===
As of 27 April 2024

Rank	No.	Nat.	Po.	Name	Championship	FA Cup	EFL Cup	EFL Trophy	Total
1	7	(Wales)	FW	Will Evans	21	2	1	1	25
2	30	(England)	FW	Seb Palmer-Houlden	7	1	1	0	9
3	8	(England)	MF	Bryn Morris	7	1	0	0	8
3	9	(England)	FW	Omar Bogle	7	1	0	0	8
5	19	(Republic of Ireland)	DF	Shane McLoughlin	3	3	0	0	6
6	20	(Republic of Ireland)	MF	Harry Charsley	5	0	0	0	5
7	24	(England)	MF	Aaron Wildig	2	1	1	0	4
8	10	(Republic of the Congo)	FW	Offrande Zanzala	3	0	0	0	3
8	Own Goals				2	1	0	0	3
10	2	(England)	DF	Lewis Payne	1	1	0	0	2
10	3	(England)	DF	Adam Lewis	2	0	0	0	2
10	5	(England)	DF	James Clarke	0	2	0	0	2
13	4	(Republic of Ireland)	DF	Ryan Delaney	1	0	0	0	1
13	18	(Wales)	MF	Kiban Rai	0	0	1	0	1
13	22	(Wales)	MF	Nathan Wood	0	0	0	1	1
13	23	(England)	DF	Kyle Jameson	1	0	0	0	1
Total					60	13	4	2	79

=== Disciplinary record ===
As of 16 January 2024

Rank	No.	Nat.	Po.	Name	Championship			FA Cup			EFL Cup			EFL Trophy			Total		
Rank	No.	Nat.	Po.	Name	Yellow card	(yellow card) (yellow-red card)	Red card	Yellow card	(yellow card) (yellow-red card)	Red card	Yellow card	(yellow card) (yellow-red card)	Red card	Yellow card	(yellow card) (yellow-red card)	Red card	Yellow card	(yellow card) (yellow-red card)	Red card
1	2	(England)	DF	Lewis Payne	6	0	0	3	0	0	1	0	0	1	0	0	11	0	0
1	7	(Wales)	FW	Will Evans	10	0	0	0	0	0	0	0	0	1	0	0	11	0	0
3	24	(England)	MF	Aaron Wildig	9	0	0	0	0	0	1	0	0	0	0	0	10	0	0
4	8	(England)	MF	Bryn Morris	8	0	0	1	0	0	0	0	0	0	0	0	9	0	0
5	9	(England)	FW	Omar Bogle	5	0	0	1	0	0	0	0	0	1	0	0	7	0	0
5	17	(England)	MF	Scot Bennett	7	0	0	0	0	0	0	0	0	0	0	0	7	0	0
5	20	(Republic of Ireland)	MF	Harry Charsley	5	0	0	0	0	0	2	0	0	0	0	0	7	0	0
8	3	(England)	DF	Adam Lewis	3	0	1	0	0	0	1	0	0	0	0	0	4	0	1
8	4	(Republic of Ireland)	DF	Ryan Delaney	3	1	0	0	0	0	0	0	0	0	0	0	3	1	0
8	23	(England)	DF	Kyle Jameson	5	0	0	0	0	0	0	0	0	0	0	0	5	0	0
11	19	(Republic of Ireland)	DF	Shane McLoughlin	2	0	0	1	0	0	0	0	0	1	0	0	4	0	0
11	33	(England)	DF	Matty Bondswell	3	0	0	0	0	0	0	0	0	1	0	0	4	0	0
13	5	(England)	DF	James Clarke	3	0	0	0	0	0	0	0	0	0	0	0	3	0	0
13	11	(Wales)	MF	James Waite	1	0	0	1	0	0	1	0	0	0	0	0	3	0	0
15	1	(Antigua and Barbuda)	GK	Nick Townsend	2	0	0	0	0	0	0	0	0	0	0	0	2	0	0
15	6	(England)	DF	Declan Drysdale	2	0	0	0	0	0	0	0	0	0	0	0	2	0	0
15	28	(Wales)	DF	Matt Baker	1	0	0	1	0	0	0	0	0	0	0	0	2	0	0
18	10	(Republic of the Congo)	FW	Offrande Zanzala	1	0	0	0	0	0	0	0	0	0	0	0	1	0	0
18	14	(Wales)	DF	Harrison Bright	1	0	0	0	0	0	0	0	0	0	0	0	1	0	0
18	22	(Wales)	MF	Nathan Wood	0	0	0	1	0	0	0	0	0	0	0	0	1	0	0
18	30	(England)	FW	Seb Palmer-Houlden	1	0	0	0	0	0	0	0	0	0	0	0	1	0	0
18	31	(Wales)	FW	Luke Jephcott	1	0	0	0	0	0	0	0	0	0	0	0	1	0	0
18	41	(Portugal)	DF	Nelson Sanca	1	0	0	0	0	0	0	0	0	0	0	0	1	0	0
Total					75	1	1	10	0	0	6	0	0	6	0	0	97	1	1

== Transfers ==
=== In ===
Date	Pos	Player	Transferred from	Fee	Ref
1 July 2023	CB	(England) Kyle Jameson	(England) Tranmere Rovers	Free Transfer	
1 July 2023	DM	(England) Bryn Morris	(England) Grimsby Town	Free Transfer	
1 July 2023	AM	(Wales) Nathan Wood	(Wales) Penybont	Free Transfer	
10 July 2023	RB	(Republic of Ireland) Shane McLoughlin	(England) Salford City	Free Transfer	
21 July 2023	CB	(Republic of Ireland) Ryan Delaney	(England) Morecambe	Free Transfer	
24 July 2023	CB	(Republic of Ireland) Josh Seberry	(Republic of Ireland) Shelbourne	Free Transfer	
28 July 2023	GK	(England) Jonny Maxted	(England) Northampton Town	Free Transfer	
25 January 2024	ST	(Wales) Luke Jephcott	(Scotland) St Johnstone	Free Transfer	

=== Out ===
Date	Pos	Player	Transferred to	Fee	Ref
30 June 2024	CF	(England) Omar Bogle	(England) Crewe Alexandra	Free transfer	
30 June 2024	CM	(Wales) Sam Bowen	(England) Solihull Moors	Free transfer	
30 June 2024	RB	(Wales) Harrison Bright	(England) Salisbury	Free transfer	
30 June 2024	GK	(England) Joe Day	(England) Cheltenham Town	Free transfer	
30 June 2024	CB	(England) Declan Drysdale	(England) Tranmere Rovers	Free transfer	
30 June 2024	GK	(England) Jonny Maxted	(England) Brackley Town	Free transfer	
30 June 2024	AM	(Wales) James Waite	(England) Weston-super-Mare	Free transfer	
30 June 2024	CF	(Republic of the Congo) Offrande Zanzala	(England) Fylde	Free transfer	
30 June 2024	CM	(England) Scot Bennett	(England) Cheltenham Town	Free transfer	
30 June 2024	DF	(Republic of Ireland) Ryan Delaney	(England) Swindon Town	Free transfer	
30 June 2024	MF	(England) Harry Charsley	(England) Oldham Athletic	Free transfer	

=== Loaned in ===
Date	Pos	Player	Loaned from	Fee	Ref
1 July 2023	LB	(England) Matty Bondswell	(England) Newcastle United	End of Season	
20 July 2023	CF	(England) Seb Palmer-Houlden	(England) Bristol City	End of Season	
28 July 2023	LB	(England) Adam Lewis	(England) Liverpool	End of Season	
11 August 2023	RB	(England) Lewis Payne	(England) Southampton	End of Season	
1 September 2023	CB	(Wales) Matt Baker	(England) Stoke City	End of Season	
1 September 2023	CF	(England) Olly Thomas	(England) Bristol City	24 November 2023 (Note: On 24 November, Olly Thomas returned to parent club Bristol City.)	

=== Loaned out ===
Date	Pos	Player	Loaned to	Until	Ref
28 July 2023	GK	(England) Joe Day	(England) Woking	1 September 2023 (Note: Day was recalled back early from his season-long at Woking to join Yeovil.)	
10 August 2023	CM	(Wales) Sam Bowen	(England) Wealdstone	End of Season	
31 August 2023	DF	(Wales) Harrison Bright	(England) Barry Town United	31 December 2023 (Note: On 31 December, Bright was recalled back early from his loan at Barry Town.)	
1 September 2023	GK	(England) Joe Day	(England) Yeovil Town	End of Season	
1 February 2024	LW	(Wales) Nathan Wood	(Republic of Ireland) Cork City	End of Season	

== Pre-season and friendlies ==
On 18 May, Newport County announced their first pre-season fixture, against Undy. A day later, a trip to face Bristol City was confirmed. On June 5, a third pre-season opposition was added, against Yeovil Town. The club later announced a fourth friendly, against Pontypridd United. On 20 June, County added a trip to face Sheffield.

Win Draw Loss Fixtures

8 July 2023 Friendly	Undy	0–4	Newport County	Undy
15:00 BST (UTC+1)		Report	Morris 1' (pen.); Waite 34'; Rai 76', 90'	Stadium: The Causeway; Attendance: 665

11 July 2023 Friendly	Pontypridd United	1–2	Newport County	Pontypridd
19:30 BST (UTC+1)	Ahmun 78'	Report	McLoughlin 34'; Bowen 80'	Stadium: USW Sports Park

14 July 2023 Friendly	Sheffield	1–0	Newport County	Dronfield
19:45 BST (UTC+1)	Mangham 12'	Report		Stadium: Home of Football Ground

18 July 2023 Friendly	Swansea City	5–0	Newport County	Upper Killay
15:00 BST (UTC+1)	Cabango 51'; Key 54'; Piroe 79' (pen.); Thomas 83', 87'	Report		Stadium: Fairwood Training Ground; Attendance: 0 (behind closed doors)

22 July 2023 Friendly	Bristol City	8–0	Newport County	Bristol
12:30 BST (UTC+1)	Bell 8'; Wells 14', 38', 51' (pen.); Vyner 43'; Scott 49', 62', 90'	Report		Stadium: Robins High Performance Centre

25 July 2023 Friendly	Yeovil Town	2–0	Newport County	Yeovil
19:45 BST (UTC+1)	Williams 21'; Hyde 73'	Report		Stadium: Huish Park; Attendance: 2,177 (153 Newport fans)

== Competitions ==
=== Overall record ===
Competition	Starting round	Record							
Competition	Starting round	Pld	W	D	L	GF	GA	GD	Win %
League Two	Matchday 1	5	3	0	2	12	8	+4	60.00
FA Cup	First round	0	0	0	0	0	0	+0	—
EFL Cup	First round	2	1	1	0	4	2	+2	50.00
EFL Trophy	Group stage	0	0	0	0	0	0	+0	—
Total		7	4	1	2	16	10	+6	57.14

Last updated: 29 August 2023
Source: Soccerway

=== League Two ===
==== League table ====
Pos	Team	Pld	W	D	L	GF	GA	GD	Pts
15	Morecambe	46	17	10	19	67	81	−14	58 (Note: On 11 April 2024, Morecambe were deducted three points for failing to pay players and staff on time following previous EFL rules breaches in the 2023–24 season.)
16	Tranmere Rovers	46	17	6	23	67	70	−3	57
17	Accrington Stanley	46	16	9	21	63	71	−8	57
18	Newport County	46	16	7	23	62	76	−14	55
19	Swindon Town	46	14	12	20	77	83	−6	54
20	Salford City	46	13	12	21	66	82	−16	51
21	Grimsby Town	46	11	16	19	57	74	−17	49

Source: EFL Official Website
Rules for classification: 1) Points; 2) Goal difference; 3) Number of goals scored; 4) Head-to-head results; 5) Wins; 6) Away goals; 7) Penalty points (sec 9.5); 8) 12-point sending off offences

==== Results summary ====
Overall								Home						Away					
Pld	W	D	L	GF	GA	GD	Pts	W	D	L	GF	GA	GD	W	D	L	GF	GA	GD
46	16	7	23	62	76	−14	55	9	6	8	37	37	0	7	1	15	25	39	−14

Last updated: 27 April 2024.
Source: Soccerway

==== Results by round ====
Round	1	2	3	4	5	6	7	8	9	10	11	12	13	14	15	16	17	18	19	20	21	22	23	24	25	26	28	29	31	32	33	34	35	30^{2}	36	37	38	39	40	41	42	43	27^{1}	44	45	46
Ground	A	H	A	A	H	H	A	H	H	A	H	H	A	H	A	A	H	A	H	A	A	H	A	H	H	A	A	H	H	A	H	H	A	A	H	A	H	A	A	A	H	A	H	H	H	A
Result	L	W	L	W	W	D	L	D	L	L	W	L	L	D	L	W	D	L	W	W	L	D	L	W	D	D	W	W	W	W	L	W	L	W	L	L	W	W	L	L	L	L	L	L	L	L
Position	23	9	18	12	6	6	13	12	15	17	14	19	20	19	19	19	20	20	16	15	15	17	17	17	18	18	17	14	13	11	14	14	16	10	12	13	12	11	11	12	13	16	16	16	17	18

Updated to match(es) played on 27 April 2024. Source: Soccerway
A = Away; H = Home; W = Win; D = Draw; L = Loss; P = Postponed
Notes:
- ^{1} Matchday 27 (vs Accrington Stanley) was postponed due FA Cup involvement.
- ^{2} Matchday 30 (vs Harrogate Town) was postponed due to FA Cup involvement.

==== Matches ====
On 22 June, the EFL League Two fixtures were released.

Win Draw Loss Fixtures

5 August 2023 1	Accrington Stanley	3–0	Newport County	Accrington
15:00 BST (UTC+1)	Nolan 24'; Whalley 80'; Adedoyin 90+4'	Report		Stadium: Crown Ground; Attendance: 2,416; Referee: Martin Woods

12 August 2023 2	Newport County	4–0	Doncaster Rovers	Newport
15:00 BST (UTC+1)	Palmer-Houlden 24'; Evans 14', 49'; Wood 21' (o.g.)	Report		Stadium: Rodney Parade; Attendance: 3,989; Referee: Thomas Kirk

15 August 2023 3	Crewe Alexandra	4–2	Newport County	Crewe
19:45 BST (UTC+1)	Demetriou 8', 57'; Long 66' (pen.); Nevitt 71'	Report	Evans 21'; Charsley 75'	Stadium: Gresty Road; Attendance: 3,619; Referee: Adam Herczeg

19 August 2023 4	Forest Green Rovers	0–3	Newport County	Nailsworth
15:00 BST (UTC+1)		Report	Evans 1', 25'; Lewis 88' (pen.)	Stadium: The New Lawn; Attendance: 2,292; Referee: Scott Jackson

26 August 2023 5	Newport County	3–1	Sutton United	Newport
15:00 BST (UTC+1)	Kizzi 70' (o.g.); Charsley 77'; Evans 87'	Report	Patrick 53'	Stadium: Rodney Parade; Attendance: 3,730; Referee: Matthew Corlett

2 September 2023 6	Newport County	2–2	Wimbledon	Newport
15:00 BST (UTC+1)	Evans 45+2'; Bogle 55'	Report	Tilley 9', 30'	Stadium: Rodney Parade; Attendance: 4,008; Referee: Jacob Miles

9 September 2023 7	Crawley Town	4–1	Newport County	Crawley
15:00 BST (UTC+1)	Tsaroulla 5'; Campbell 54', 67'; Gladwin 79'	Report	Bogle 10'	Stadium: Broadfield Stadium; Attendance: 2,663; Referee: Scott Tallis

16 September 2023 8	Newport County	1–1	Barrow	Newport
15:00 BST (UTC+1)	McLoughlin 43'	Report	Campbell 69' (pen.)	Stadium: Rodney Parade; Attendance: 3,539; Referee: Martin Coy

23 September 2023 9	Newport County	1–4	Bradford City	Newport
15:00 BST (UTC+1)	Bogle 35'	Report	Cook 14', 29', 90+2'; Tulloch 26'	Stadium: Rodney Parade; Attendance: 4,087; Referee: Andy Davies

30 September 2023 10	Salford City	2–1	Newport County	Salford
15:00 BST (UTC+1)	Lund 25'; Drysdale 45+6' (o.g.)	Report	Morris 31'	Stadium: Moor Lane; Attendance: 2,006; Referee: Seb Stockbridge

3 October 2023 11	Newport County	2–1	Colchester United	Newport
19:45 BST (UTC+1)	Evans 43'; Bogle 63'	Report	Tovide 34'	Stadium: Rodney Parade; Attendance: 3,220; Referee: Lewis Smith

7 October 2023 12	Newport County	1–2	Harrogate Town	Newport
15:00 BST (UTC+1)	Evans 58'	Report	Thomson 42'; O'Connor 52'	Stadium: Rodney Parade; Attendance: 3,357; Referee: Rebecca Welch

14 October 2023 13	Swindon Town	2–0	Newport County	Swindon
15:00 BST (UTC+1)	Kemp 8'; Hepburn-Murphy 82'	Report		Stadium: County Ground; Attendance: 9,628; Referee: David Rock

20 October 2023 14	Newport County	3–3	Walsall	Newport
19:45 BST (UTC+1)	Morris 4', 67'; Evans 45+4'	Report	Draper 16', 53', 90+6'	Stadium: Rodney Parade; Attendance: 3,896; Referee: Sunny Sukhvir Gill

24 October 2023 15	Notts County	3–0	Newport County	Nottingham
19:45 BST (UTC+1)	Crowley 24'; Langstaff 34', 54'	Report		Stadium: Meadow Lane; Attendance: 8,095; Referee: Charles Breakspear

28 October 2023 16	Gillingham	0–2	Newport County	Gillingham
15:00 BST (UTC+1)		Report	Bogle 20' (pen.), 27' (pen.)	Stadium: Priestfield Stadium; Attendance: 5,869; Referee: Tom Reeves

11 November 2023 17	Newport County	0–0	Milton Keynes Dons	Newport
15:00 UTC		Report		Stadium: Rodney Parade; Attendance: 3,777; Referee: Ben Atkinson

18 November 2023 18	Mansfield Town	2–0	Newport County	Mansfield
15:00 UTC	Keillor-Dunn 4', 52'	Report		Stadium: Field Mill; Attendance: 6,877; Referee: Thomas Kirk

25 November 2023 19	Newport County	2–1	Stockport County	Newport
15:00 UTC	Morris 45+5'; McLoughlin 68'	Report	Olaofe 90+6'	Stadium: Rodney Parade; Attendance: 4,053; Referee: Darren Drysdale

28 November 2023 20	Morecambe	1–2	Newport County	Morecambe
19:45 UTC	Mellon 12'	Report	Evans 28'; Palmer-Houlden 57'	Stadium: Mazuma Stadium; Attendance: 2,982; Referee: Ross Joyce

9 December 2023 21	Tranmere Rovers	2–1	Newport County	Birkenhead
15:00 UTC	Morris 57'; Jennings 88'	Report	Evans 22'	Stadium: Prenton Park; Attendance: 5,681; Referee: Seb Stockbridge

16 December 2023 22	Newport County	1–1	Grimsby Town	Newport
15:00 UTC	Bogle 72'	Report	Rose 78'	Stadium: Rodney Parade; Attendance: 3,809; Referee: Tom Nield

23 December 2023 23	Wrexham	2–0	Newport County	Wrexham
15:00 UTC	Jones 64'; Lee 87'	Report		Stadium: Racecourse Ground; Attendance: 12,095; Referee: John Busby

26 December 2023 24	Newport County	4–2	Forest Green Rovers	Newport
15:00 UTC	Evans 60', 63'; Payne 69'; Delaney 84'	Report	Delaney 2' (o.g.); Stevens 33'	Stadium: Rodney Parade; Attendance: 4,576; Referee: Stephen Martin

29 December 2023 25	Newport County	1–1	Crewe Alexandra	Newport
19:45 UTC	Evans 64'	Report	Long 48'	Stadium: Rodney Parade; Attendance: 3,926; Referee: Ben Speedie

1 January 2024 26	Sutton United	1–1	Newport County	Sutton, London
15:00 UTC	Fadahunsi 90'	Report	McLoughlin 79'	Stadium: Gander Green Lane; Attendance: 2,737; Referee: Alan Young

13 January 2024 28	Doncaster Rovers	0–1	Newport County	Doncaster
15:00 UTC		Report	Palmer-Houlden 90+3'	Stadium: Eco-Power Stadium; Attendance: 5,889; Referee: Alex Chilowicz

20 January 2024 29	Newport County	1–0	Wrexham	Newport
15:00 UTC	Palmer-Houlden 34'	Report		Stadium: Rodney Parade; Attendance: 9,537; Referee: Simon Mather

3 February 2024 31	Newport County	2–1	Swindon Town	Newport
12:45 UTC	Evans 53'; Palmer-Houlden 74'	Report	Glatzel 46'	Stadium: Rodney Parade; Attendance: 5,912; Referee: Matthew Corlett
Note: Fixture was originally set for a 15:00 kick-off, but was pushed forward following a safety assessment.

10 February 2024 32	Walsall	0–3	Newport County	Walsall
15:00 UTC		Report	Morris 4'; Evans 15'; Charsley 38'	Stadium: Bescot Stadium; Attendance: 5,454; Referee: Lee Swabey

13 February 2024 33	Newport County	1–3	Notts County	Newport
19:45 UTC	Evans 90' (pen.)	Report	Langstaff 22', 59'; McGoldrick 35'	Stadium: Rodney Parade; Attendance: Charles Breakspear; Referee: 4,426

17 February 2024 34	Newport County	1–0	Gillingham	Newport
15:00 UTC	Evans 61'	Report		Stadium: Rodney Parade; Attendance: 4,724; Referee: Ollie Yates

24 February 2024 35	Milton Keynes Dons	3–0	Newport County	Milton Keynes
15:00 UTC	Kemp 12'; Payne 23'; Gilbey 29'	Report		Stadium: Stadium MK; Attendance: 6,354; Referee: Ben Atkinson

27 February 2024 30	Harrogate Town	1–4	Newport County	Harrogate
19:45 UTC	Thomson 78'	Report	Evans 31' (pen.); Zanzala 33', 52'; Palmer-Houlden 70'	Stadium: Wetherby Road; Attendance: 2,006; Referee: Ruebyn Ricardo
Note: Fixture was originally scheduled for 26 January 2024, but was postponed due to Newport's FA Cup fixture clash.

2 March 2024 36	Newport County	0–1	Mansfield Town	Newport
15:00 UTC		Report	Maris 50'	Stadium: Rodney Parade; Attendance: 4,833; Referee: Adam Herczeg

9 March 2024 37	Stockport County	1–0	Newport County	Stockport
15:00 UTC	Madden 90+3'	Report		Stadium: Edgeley Park; Attendance: 8,865; Referee: Tom Reeves

12 March 2024 38	Newport County	5–3	Morecambe	Newport
19:45 UTC	Wildig 12', 54'; Lewis 18'; Charsley 78'; Palmer-Houlden 90+7'	Report	Edwards 31', 74'; Stokes 70'	Stadium: Rodney Parade; Attendance: 3,508; Referee: Scott Simpson

16 March 2024 39	Wimbledon	0–2	Newport County	Wimbledon, London
15:00 UTC		Report	Morris 10'; Jameson 55'	Stadium: Plough Lane; Attendance: 8,703; Referee: Thomas Parsons

23 March 2024 40	Barrow	1–0	Newport County	Barrow-in-Furness
15:00 UTC	Stockton 20'	Report		Stadium: Holker Street; Attendance: 3,379; Referee: Ben Speedie

29 March 2024 41	Colchester United	2–1	Newport County	Colchester
15:00 UTC	Iandolo 75'; Mingi 90+2'	Report	Zanzala 42'	Stadium: Colchester Community Stadium; Attendance: 4,308; Referee: Sunny Sukhvir Gill

1 April 2024 42	Newport County	0–4	Crawley Town	Newport
15:00 BST (UTC+1)		Report	Conroy 1'; Darcy 26'; Maguire 69'; Campbell 90+1'	Stadium: Rodney Parade; Attendance: 4,643; Referee: Martin Woods

6 April 2024 43	Grimsby Town	1–0	Newport County	Cleethorpes
15:00 BST (UTC+1)	Rose 33'	Report		Stadium: Blundell Park; Attendance: 5,951; Referee: Bobby Madley

9 April 2024 27	Newport County	1–3	Accrington Stanley	Newport
19:45 BST (UTC+1)	Morris 31'	Report	Henderson 22'; Leigh 46'; Pritchard 67'	Stadium: Rodney Parade; Attendance: 3,201; Referee: Darren Drysdale
Note: Fixture was originally scheduled for 6 January 2024, but was postponed due to Newport's FA Cup fixture clash.

13 April 2024 44	Newport County	1–2	Tranmere Rovers	Newport
15:00 BST (UTC+1)	Evans 20'	Report	Apter 25', 36'	Stadium: Rodney Parade; Attendance: Craig Hicks; Referee: 4,549

20 April 2024 45	Newport County	0–1	Salford City	Newport
15:00 BST (UTC+1)		Report	Smith 90+2'	Stadium: Rodney Parade; Attendance: 4,423; Referee: Edward Duckworth

27 April 2024 46	Bradford City	4–1	Newport County	Bradford
15:00 BST (UTC+1)	Kavanagh 44'; Cook 45+1'; Pointon 57'; Walker 90+3'	Report	Charsley 65'	Stadium: Valley Parade; Attendance: 18,842; Referee: Thomas Kirk

=== FA Cup ===
Newport were drawn at home to National League club Oldham Athletic in the first round, home to National League club Barnet in the second round, home to National League Eastleigh in the third round and home to Premier League Manchester United in the fourth round.

Win Draw Loss Fixtures

4 November 2023 First round	Newport County	2–0	Oldham Athletic	Newport
15:00 UTC	McLoughlin 20', 80'	Report		Stadium: Rodney Parade; Attendance: 2,541; Referee: David Middleton

2 December 2023 Second round	Newport County	1–1	Barnet	Newport
15:00 UTC	McLoughlin 44'	Report	Collinge 89'	Stadium: Rodney Parade; Attendance: 2,707; Referee: Jacob Miles

12 December 2023 Second round replay	Barnet	1–4	Newport County	Barnet, London
19:45 UTC	Pritchard 37'	Report	Payne 6'; Bogle 13'; Collinge 25' (o.g.); Palmer-Houlden 76'	Stadium: The Hive Stadium; Attendance: 1,451; Referee: Craig Hicks

6 January 2024 Third round	Newport County	1–1	Eastleigh	Newport
15:00 UTC	Clarke 56'	Report	Maguire 82' (pen.)	Stadium: Rodney Parade; Attendance: 4,966; Referee: Edward Duckworth

16 January 2024 Third round replay	Eastleigh	1–3	Newport County	Eastleigh
19:45 UTC	McCallum 48'	Report	Wildig 3'; Clarke 60'; Evans 79'	Stadium: Ten Acres; Attendance: 5,075; Referee: Sam Allison

28 January 2024 Fourth round	Newport County	2–4	Manchester United	Newport
16:30 UTC	Morris 36'; Evans 47'	Report	Fernandes 7'; Mainoo 13'; Antony 68'; Højlund 90+4'	Stadium: Rodney Parade; Attendance: 9,086; Referee: David Coote

=== EFL Cup ===
Newport were drawn at home to EFL League One club Charlton Athletic in the first round and at home to Premier League club Brentford in the second round.

Win Draw Loss Fixtures

8 August 2023 First round	Newport County	3–1	Charlton Athletic	Newport
19:00 BST (UTC+1)	Wildig 63'; Evans 76'; Palmer-Houlden 80'	Report	Kanu 43'	Stadium: Rodney Parade; Attendance: 2,600; Referee: Scott Simpson

29 August 2023 Second round	Newport County	1–1 (0–3 p)	Brentford	Newport
19:45 BST (UTC+1)	Rai 90+6'	Report	Jensen 87'	Stadium: Rodney Parade; Attendance: 5,916; Referee: Scott Oldham
	Penalties
	Lewis (penalty missed); Wood (penalty missed); Morris (penalty missed)		(penalty scored) Mbeumo; (penalty scored) Wissa; (penalty scored) Lewis-Potter

=== EFL Trophy ===
On 22 June 2023, the initial Group stage draw was made, grouping Newport County with Bristol Rovers, Cheltenham Town and West Ham United Under 21's.

Pos	Div	Team	Pld	W	PW	PL	L	GF	GA	GD	Pts	Qualification
1	ACA	West Ham United U21	3	3	0	0	0	8	1	+7	9	Advance to Round 2
2	L1	Bristol Rovers	3	2	0	0	1	6	4	+2	6	Advance to Round 2
3	L2	Newport County	3	1	0	0	2	2	2	0	3	
4	L1	Cheltenham Town	3	0	0	0	3	1	10	−9	0	

Updated to match(es) played on 14 November 2023. Source: EFL.com

Win Draw Loss Fixtures

10 October 2023 Group stage	Cheltenham Town	0–2	Newport County	Cheltenham
19:30 BST (UTC+1)		Report	Wood 26'; Evans 53'	Stadium: Whaddon Road; Attendance: 1,175; Referee: Matthew Russell

31 October 2023 Group stage	Newport County	0–1	West Ham United U21s	Newport
19:30 UTC		Report	Kodua 62'	Stadium: Rodney Parade; Attendance: 800; Referee: Craig Hicks

14 November 2023 Group stage	Newport County	0–1	Bristol Rovers	Newport
19:45 UTC		Report	Evans 37'	Stadium: Rodney Parade; Attendance: 1,346; Referee: Farai Hallam
