= Sanca =

Sanca is a surname. Notable people with the surname include:

- Leandro Sanca (born 2000), Portuguese footballer
- Marciano Sanca Tchami (born 2004), Bissau-Guinean footballer
- Nelson Sanca (born 2006), Portuguese footballer

== See also ==
- Ruben Sança (born 1986), Cape Verdean runner
- Sancá language
