= Oliver Greaves =

English footballer (born 1999)

Personal information
- Full name: Oliver James Greaves
- Date of birth: 2 November 1999 (age 27)
- Place of birth: Sheffield, England
- Height: 1.75 m (5 ft 9 in)
- Position: Forward

Team information
- Current team: Worksop Town
- Number: 10

Youth career
- –2019: Sheffield United

Senior career*
Years	Team	Apps	(Gls)
2019–2020	Sheffield United	0	(0)
2019	→ Barrow (loan)	9	(0)
2021	Dover Athletic	0	(0)
2021	Matlock Town	2	(0)
2021	Gainsborough Trinity	3	(0)
2022	CD Almuñécar City	14	(5)
2022	Buxton	2	(0)
2022	Liversedge	1	(0)
2022–2024	Mickleover	65	(26)
2024–2025	Newport County	16	(2)
2025-2026	Buxton	17	(3)
2026–	Worksop Town	16	(7)
- * Club domestic league appearances and goals as of 13:44, 30 April 2026 (UTC)

Oliver James Greaves (born 2 November 1999) is an English footballer who plays as a forward for National League North club Worksop Town.

== Career ==
=== Sheffield United ===
Greaves was born in Sheffield and joined the Academy of Sheffield United, progressing through the ranks to earn a scholarship deal in July 2016. Following the completion of his two-year scholarship, he signed a professional deal in 2018.

In July 2019, he joined National League side Barrow on a season-long loan deal. Having found it difficult to fully adapt to men's football, he returned to his parent club in January 2020.

He was released by Sheffield United at the end of the 2019–20 season.

=== Non-League and Spain ===
Following his release from Sheffield United, Greaves joined Dover Athletic, failing to make a first-team appearance. In August 2021, he joined Northern Premier League Premier Division side Matlock Town. Just one month later however, he departed to join Gainsborough Trinity.

In January 2022, Greaves joined Spanish club CD Almuñécar City, part of the Málaga City academy system. While in Spain, he scored five goals in 14 league appearances in the Primera Andaluza Granada.

In August 2022, he returned to England with Buxton, departing for Liveresedge in October of the same year.

On 14 October 2022, Greaves joined Southern Football League Premier Division Central club Mickleover. The 2023–24 season saw Greaves have his best individual season, scoring twenty-four goals in all competitions as Mickleover reached the play-offs.

=== Newport County ===
In June 2024, Greaves joined League Two club Newport County on a two-year deal. On 10 August 2024, Greaves made his debut for the club, scoring his side's second goal in a 3–2 opening day defeat to Cheltenham Town. Greaves left Newport by mutual consent on 28 August 2025.

=== Return to Non-League ===
Following his release from Newport, Greaves returned to the National League North with Buxton, with whom he had previously played for in 2022. This time around he had more of an impact, playing 23 times and scoring on 3 occasions, before departing in January 2026.

On 2 February 2026 it was announced that Greaves had signed for fellow National League North club Worksop Town. Five days later Greaves scored 2 goals on his debut against Telford United. He finished the season with Worksop having played 18 times and scoring 8 goals in all competitions.

== Career statistics ==
As of match played 16 April 2026

Appearances and goals by club, season and competition
Club	Season	League			FA Cup		League Cup		Other		Total	
Club	Season	Division	Apps	Goals	Apps	Goals	Apps	Goals	Apps	Goals	Apps	Goals
Sheffield United	2019–20	Premier League	0	0	0	0	0	0	—		0	0
Barrow (loan)	2019–20	National League	9	0	0	0	—		1 (Note: Appearance(s) in FA Trophy)	0	10	0
Matlock Town	2021–22	NPL Premier Division	2	0	0	0	—		0	0	2	0
Gainsborough Trinity	2021–22	NPL Premier Division	3	0	0	0	—		0	0	3	0
Buxton	2022–23	National League North	2	0	0	0	—		0	0	2	0
Liversedge	2022–23	NPL Premier Division	1	0	0	0	—		1	0	2	0
Mickleover	2022–23	Southern Premier Division Central	26	8	0	0	—		1 (Note: Appearance(s) in Derbyshire Senior Cup)	0	27	8
Mickleover	2023–24	Southern Premier Division Central	39	18	3	1	—		6 (Note: Four appearances and five goals in FA Trophy, one appearance in Derbyshire Senior Cup, one appearance in Southern Premier Division Central play-offs)	5	48	24
Newport County	2024–25	League Two	16	2	0	0	0	0	3 (Note: Appearances in the EFL Trophy)	1	19	3
Buxton	2025–26	National League North	17	3	5	0	—		1	0	23	3
Worksop Town	2025–26	National League North	16	7	0	0	—		2 (Note: Two appearances and one goal in the Sheffield Senior Cup)	1	18	8
Career total			129	35	8	1	0	0	14	6	143	41
