= Nathan Wood (footballer, born 1997) =

Welsh footballer (born 1997)

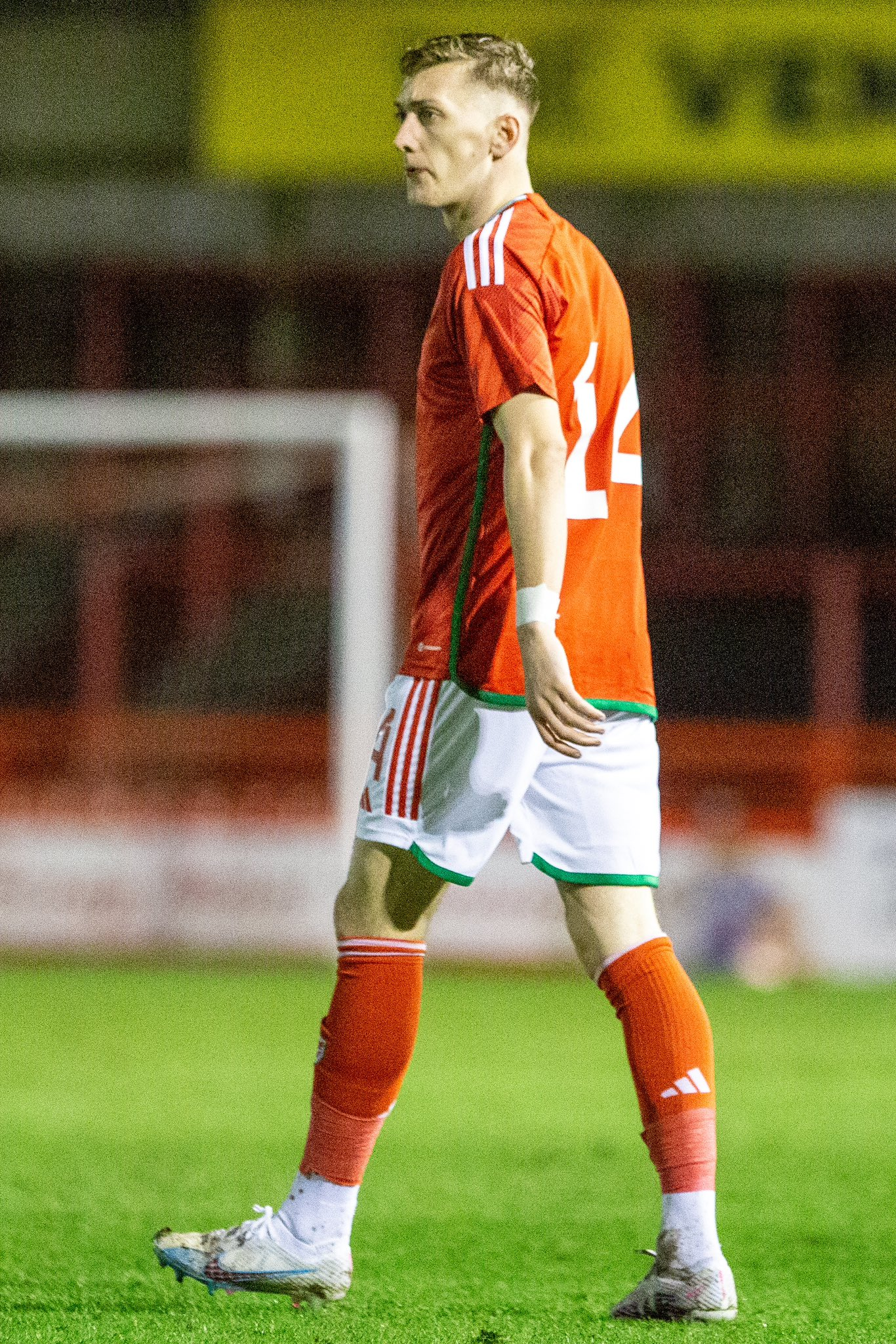
- Wood playing for Wales C

Personal information
- Full name: Nathan Daniel Wood
- Date of birth: 23 April 1997 (age 29)
- Height: 1.80 m (5 ft 11 in)
- Position: Attacking midfielder

Team information
- Current team: Penybont
- Number: 7

Youth career
- Newport County

Senior career*
Years	Team	Apps	(Gls)
2015–2019	Undy Athletic		
2019–2023	Penybont	114	(25)
2023–2025	Newport County	13	(0)
2024	→ Cork City (loan)	13	(0)
2024–2025	→ Penybont (loan)	17	(4)
2025–	Penybont	46	(4)
- * Club domestic league appearances and goals as of 08:15, 8 November 2026 (UTC)

Nathan Daniel Wood (born 23 April 1997) is a Welsh professional footballer who plays as an attacking midfielder for Penybont.

== Club career ==
Wood was part of the Newport County academy system until 2015. He then played for Undy Athletic and Penybont.

In June 2023 Wood signed a professional contract with Newport County. He made his debut for Newport on 12 August 2023 as a second-half substitute in the 4–0 League Two win against Doncaster Rovers. Wood scored his first goal for Newport on 10 October 2023 in the 2-0 EFL Trophy win against Cheltenham Town.

In February 2024 Wood joined League of Ireland First Division club Cork City on loan until summer 2024. He returned to former club Penybont on loan in August 2024. He was released by Newport County at the end of the 2024-25 season. He then re-signed for Penybont.

== International career ==
Wood was involved with the Wales under-18 team.

== Career statistics ==
As of 19 July 2025

Appearances and goals by club, season and competition
Club	Season	League			National cup (Note: Includes Welsh Cup, FA Cup, FAI Cup)		League cup (Note: Includes Welsh League Cup, EFL Cup)		Other		Total	
Club	Season	Division	Apps	Goals	Apps	Goals	Apps	Goals	Apps	Goals	Apps	Goals
Penybont	2019–20	Cymru Premier	23	1	1	1	0	0	0	0	24	2
Penybont	2020–21	Cymru Premier	31	4	0	0	0	0	0	0	31	4
Penybont	2021–22	Cymru Premier	28	9	4	2	0	0	0	0	32	11
Penybont	2022–23	Cymru Premier	32	11	3	3	0	0	0	0	35	14
Penybont	Total		114	25	8	6	0	0	0	0	122	31
Newport County	2023–24	EFL League Two	12	0	2	0	1	0	3 (Note: Appearances in EFL Trophy)	1	18	1
Newport County	2024–25	EFL League Two	1	0	0	0	1	0	0	0	2	0
Newport County	Total		13	0	2	0	2	0	3	0	20	1
Cork City (loan)	2024	League of Ireland First Division	13	0	0	0	0	0	0	0	13	0
Penybont (loan)	2024–25	Cymru Premier	15	4	0	0	1	0	0	0	16	4
Penybont	2025–26	Cymru Premier	0	0	0	0	0	0	2 (Note: Appearances in the UEFA Conference League)	1	2	1
Career total			155	29	10	6	3	0	5	2	173	37
