= Shane McLoughlin =

Irish footballer (born 1997)

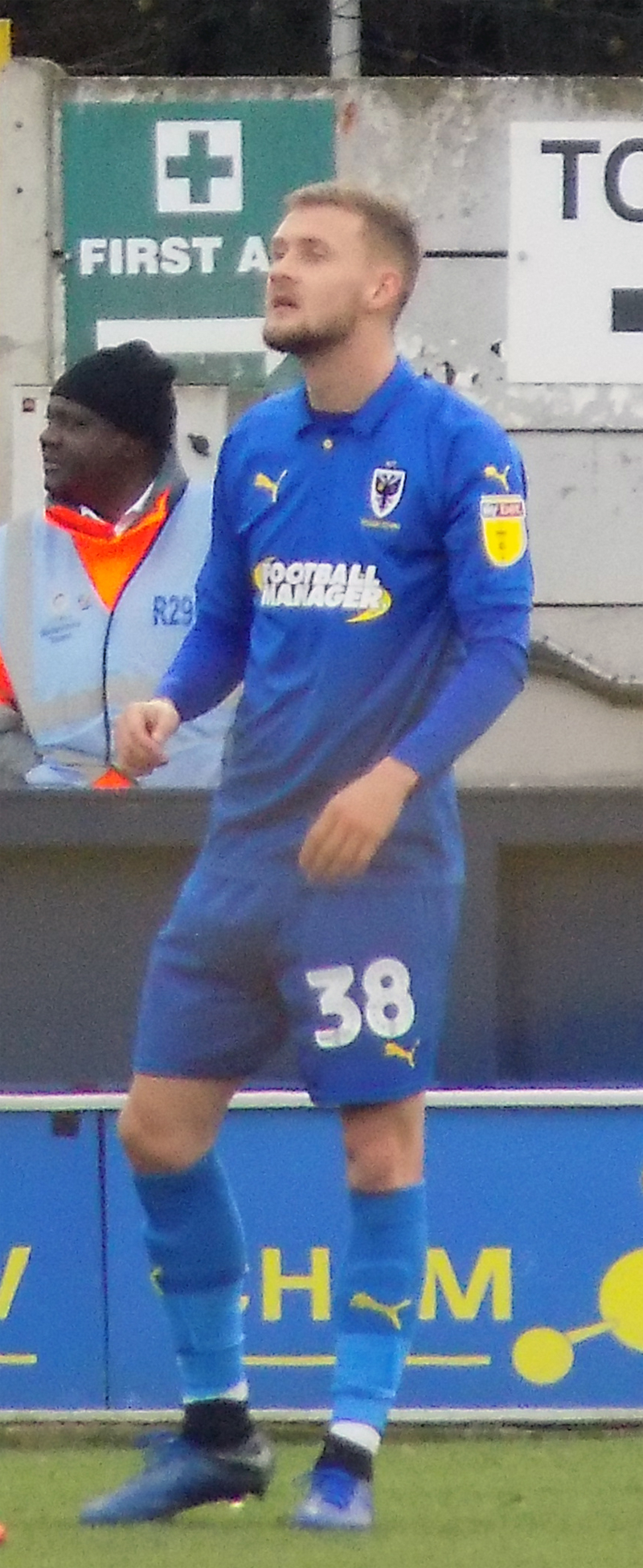
- McLoughlin playing for AFC Wimbledon in 2019

Personal information
- Full name: Shane Daniel McLoughlin
- Date of birth: 1 March 1997 (age 29)
- Place of birth: The Bronx, New York, U.S.
- Height: 1.75 m (5 ft 9 in)
- Positions: Defender; midfielder

Team information
- Current team: Cambridge United
- Number: 21

Youth career
- Castleisland
- Killorglin
- St. Brendan's Park
- 2013–2016: Ipswich Town

Senior career*
| Years | Team | Apps | (Gls) |
| 2016–2019 | Ipswich Town | 1 | (0) |
| 2016–2017 | → Bromley (loan) | 7 | (0) |
| 2018 | → Bromley (loan) | 2 | (0) |
| 2019–2021 | AFC Wimbledon | 71 | (3) |
| 2021–2023 | Morecambe | 43 | (1) |
| 2023 | Salford City | 10 | (0) |
| 2023–2025 | Newport County | 70 | (6) |
| 2025– | Cambridge United | 25 | (2) |

International career^{‡}
| 2012–2013 | Republic of Ireland U16 | 3 | (0) |
| 2014–2015 | Republic of Ireland U18 | 3 | (0) |
- * Club domestic league appearances and goals as of 08:23, 4 November 2026 (UTC) ‡ National team caps and goals as of 13:11, 27 April 2019 (UTC)

Shane Daniel McLoughlin (born 1 March 1997) is an Irish professional footballer who plays as a defender or midfielder for EFL League One club Cambridge United. Born in the United States, he represents the Republic of Ireland at youth level.

== Early life ==
McLoughlin was born in New York City, where his family lived in the Bronx. He moved to County Kerry, Ireland, when he was five years old.

== Club career ==
=== Ipswich Town ===
McLoughlin joined Ipswich Town from Kerry-based club St. Brendan's Park in July 2013, signing a two-year scholarship with the side. In April 2015, the scholarship was extended for the 2015–16 season.

McLoughlin signed a one-year professional contract in July 2016 with the option of a further 12-month stay at Portman Road.

He made his Ipswich Town debut in a 2–1 EFL Cup Second Round defeat away at Crystal Palace on 22 August 2017. He started the match and was substituted for Monty Patterson in the 81st minute.

==== Loans to Bromley ====
In March 2017, McLoughlin joined National League club Bromley on loan for the rest of the season. He made seven league appearances for Bromley during this spell. McLoughlin had another brief spell on loan with Bromley the following season as he made two league appearances.

=== AFC Wimbledon ===
On 31 January 2019, McLoughlin joined AFC Wimbledon in a free transfer on an 18-month deal. He made his debut for the club 12 days later in a 1–0 win away at Walsall. He scored his first senior career goal on 9 March 2019 in a 2–0 home victory over Doncaster Rovers.

In June 2020, Wimbledon exercised the option on the midfielder's contract to keep him at the club for at least a further year. Manager Glyn Hodges praised McLoughlin upon his signing: "Shane can play in a number of positions, and he's getting better and better. He's still young and hungry to keep on improving, so we are delighted we've got him."

McLoughlin departed the club in May 2021.

=== Morecambe ===
On 13 July 2021 Morecambe confirmed that McLoughlin had joined for the 2021–22 season on a one-year contract.

=== Salford City ===
In January 2023, McLoughlin signed for EFL League Two team Salford City on a reported 18-month contract. However, in May 2023 Salford confirmed that McLoughlin would be released at the end of the 2022–23 season.

=== Newport County ===
On 10 July 2023 McLoughlin joined Newport County on a two-year contract. He made his debut for Newport on 5 August 2023 in the starting line-up against Accrington Stanley. McLoughlin scored his first goal for Newport on 16 September 2023 in the 1–1 EFL League Two draw against Barrow. He was offered a contract extension by Newport at the end of the 2024–25 season but he chose to move on.

=== Cambridge United ===
On 29 July 2025, McLoughlin joined League Two side Cambridge United on a one-year deal.On 6 May 2026 the club announced he was being released.

== International career ==
McLoughlin has won caps for the Republic of Ireland at under-16 and under-18 levels. He remains eligible for Ireland and the United States

== Career statistics ==
As of match played 3 November 2026

Appearances and goals by club, season and competition
| Club | Season | League | | | FA Cup | | League Cup | | Other | | Total | |
| Club | Season | Division | Apps | Goals | Apps | Goals | Apps | Goals | Apps | Goals | Apps | Goals |
|---|---|---|---|---|---|---|---|---|---|---|---|---|
| Ipswich Town | 2016–17 | Championship | 0 | 0 | 0 | 0 | 0 | 0 | — | | 0 | 0 |
| Ipswich Town | 2017–18 | Championship | 1 | 0 | 0 | 0 | 1 | 0 | — | | 2 | 0 |
| Ipswich Town | 2018–19 | Championship | 0 | 0 | 0 | 0 | 0 | 0 | — | | 0 | 0 |
| Ipswich Town | Total | | 1 | 0 | 0 | 0 | 1 | 0 | 0 | 0 | 2 | 0 |
| Bromley (loan) | 2016–17 | National League | 7 | 0 | — | | — | | — | | 7 | 0 |
| Bromley (loan) | 2017–18 | National League | 2 | 0 | — | | — | | 0 | 0 | 2 | 0 |
| Bromley (loan) | Total | | 9 | 0 | 0 | 0 | 0 | 0 | 0 | 0 | 9 | 0 |
| AFC Wimbledon | 2018–19 | League One | 10 | 1 | 1 | 0 | 0 | 0 | 0 | 0 | 11 | 1 |
| AFC Wimbledon | 2019–20 | League One | 23 | 1 | 2 | 0 | 0 | 0 | 1 (Note: Appearance in EFL Trophy) | 0 | 26 | 1 |
| AFC Wimbledon | 2020–21 | League One | 38 | 1 | 2 | 0 | 0 | 0 | 4 | 0 | 44 | 1 |
| AFC Wimbledon | Total | | 71 | 3 | 5 | 0 | 0 | 0 | 5 | 0 | 81 | 3 |
| Morecambe | 2021–22 | League One | 36 | 1 | 2 | 0 | 2 | 0 | 2 | 1 | 42 | 2 |
| Morecambe | 2022–23 | League One | 7 | 0 | 0 | 0 | 2 | 0 | 3 | 0 | 12 | 0 |
| Morecambe | Total | | 43 | 1 | 2 | 0 | 4 | 0 | 5 | 1 | 54 | 2 |
| Salford City | 2022–23 | League Two | 10 | 0 | 0 | 0 | 0 | 0 | 0 | 0 | 10 | 0 |
| Newport County | 2023–24 | League Two | 34 | 3 | 6 | 3 | 1 | 0 | 2 | 0 | 43 | 6 |
| Newport County | 2024–25 | League Two | 36 | 3 | 0 | 0 | 1 | 0 | 2 | 0 | 39 | 3 |
| Newport County | Total | | 70 | 6 | 6 | 3 | 2 | 0 | 4 | 0 | 82 | 9 |
| Cambridge United | 2025–26 | League Two | 22 | 2 | 1 | 0 | 3 | 0 | 0 | 0 | 26 | 2 |
| Cambridge United | 2026–27 | League One | 3 | 0 | 0 | 0 | 1 | 0 | 1 | 0 | 5 | 0 |
| Cambridge United | Total | | 25 | 2 | 1 | 0 | 4 | 0 | 1 | 0 | 31 | 2 |
| Career total | | | 229 | 12 | 14 | 3 | 11 | 0 | 15 | 1 | 269 | 16 |
