= Bryn Morris =

English footballer (born 1996)

Personal information
- Full name: Bryn Andrew Morris
- Date of birth: 25 April 1996 (age 30)
- Place of birth: Hartlepool, England
- Height: 6 ft 0 in (1.82 m)
- Position: Midfielder

Team information
- Current team: Harrogate Town
- Number: 8

Youth career
- –2013: Middlesbrough

Senior career*
Years	Team	Apps	(Gls)
2013–2017	Middlesbrough	2	(0)
2014	→ Burton Albion (loan)	5	(0)
2015	→ Coventry City (loan)	6	(0)
2015	→ York City (loan)	3	(0)
2016	→ Walsall (loan)	1	(0)
2017–2019	Shrewsbury Town	31	(0)
2018–2019	→ Wycombe Wanderers (loan)	19	(3)
2019–2021	Portsmouth	16	(1)
2021	→ Northampton Town (loan)	22	(0)
2021–2022	Burton Albion	7	(0)
2022	→ Hartlepool United (loan)	10	(1)
2022–2023	Grimsby Town	31	(2)
2023–2025	Newport County	65	(10)
2025–	Harrogate Town	64	(3)

International career
2011–2012	England U16	7	(0)
2012–2013	England U17	12	(3)
2013–2014	England U18	5	(0)
2014	England U19	5	(0)
2015–2016	England U20	8	(0)
- * Club domestic league appearances and goals as of 00:53, 3 May 2026 (UTC)

Bryn Andrew Morris (born 25 April 1996) is an English footballer who plays as a midfielder for National League club Harrogate Town.

== Early and personal life ==
Born on 25 April 1996, in Hartlepool, Morris attended the High Tunstall College of Science. In April 2014, he was awarded the sporting achievement award at the Hartlepool Mail's Pride of Hartlepool ceremony.

== Club career ==
=== Middlesbrough ===
Morris began his career at Middlesbrough, having joined the club when he was eleven and made progress through the academy. He made his first-team debut on 5 January 2013 in an FA Cup tie at home to Hastings United, a match that Middlesbrough won 4–1. He made his league debut on 4 May in a 2–0 defeat away to Sheffield Wednesday. Two months after making his debut, Morris signed his first professional contract with the club, which would keep him until 2016.

On 21 November 2014, Morris signed for League Two club Burton Albion on a one-month loan. One day later, Morris made his debut, where he came on as a substitute for Adam McGurk, in a 1–0 victory over Luton Town. His impressive displays at Burton Albion prompted manager Jimmy Floyd Hasselbaink to tip him for greatness. On 13 December 2014, Morris provided an assist for Shane Cansdell-Sherriff to score the third goal in a 4–0 win over Hartlepool United. Despite Burton being keen to extend the loan it never materialised, and Morris returned to Middlesbrough, having made five appearances for Burton Albion.

On 6 August 2015, Morris signed for Coventry City on a season-long loan, linking up again with Tony Mowbray, the manager under whom he had made his professional debut. He made six appearances, the last coming against Rochdale, for Coventry before being recalled by Middlesbrough on 26 October 2015.

On 27 October 2015, Morris signed for League Two club York City on a one-month loan. On 28 January 2016, Morris signed for League One club Walsall on a two-month loan.

=== Shrewsbury Town ===
Morris was released from his Middlesbrough contract in order to join League One club Shrewsbury Town on 20 January 2017 on a contract until the end of 2016–17. He made his debut for the club the following day, as an 88th-minute substitute in a 1–0 home victory over Oldham Athletic. After featuring regularly to help the club escape relegation, he signed a two-year contract extension in June 2017.

Morris joined Shrewsbury's League One rivals Wycombe Wanderers on 7 August 2018 on loan until 3 January 2019.

=== Portsmouth ===
Morris signed for League One club Portsmouth on 14 January 2019 on a two-and-a-half-year contract for an undisclosed fee. He scored his first goal for Portsmouth in a 3–3 draw against Southend United on 16 February 2019. Morris was cup-tied for Portsmouth's win in the 2019 EFL Trophy final.

On 18 January 2021, Morris signed for Northampton Town on a loan deal until the end of the season.

=== Burton Albion ===
Following his release from Portsmouth, Morris signed for League One side Burton Albion in June 2021. With his game time at Burton limited, Morris joined his hometown club Hartlepool United on loan on 31 January 2022. He made his debut for Pools in an FA Cup fourth round defeat away to Crystal Palace.

=== Grimsby Town ===
On 15 July 2022, Morris signed for Grimsby Town on a one-year deal.

Morris was part of the Grimsby team that reached the FA Cup quarter-finals for the first time since 1939, he came on as a substitute in the 2–1 win away at Premier League side Southampton that secured that achievement.

On 9 May 2023, it was announced that Morris would not be retained for the 2023–24 season and would be leaving the club when his contract expired on 30 June.

=== Newport County ===
On 23 June 2023, it was announced that Morris would join Newport County on a two-year contract when his contract with Grimsby Town expired. He made his debut for Newport on 5 August 2023 in the starting line-up against Accrington Stanley. Morris scored his first goal for Newport on 30 September 2023 in the 2–1 League Two defeat against Salford City. In January 2024 Morris scored Newport's first goal with a long range shot in their 4–2 FA Cup fourth round defeat to Manchester United of the Premier League. On 21 December 2024, he scored his first career hat-trick in the 6-3 League Two win against Milton Keynes Dons.

=== Harrogate Town ===
On 1 January 2025, Morris joined EFL League Two club Harrogate Town for an undisclosed fee.

== International career ==
Morris has represented England at under-16, under-17, under-18, and under-19 levels, captaining the team at each level.

== Career statistics ==
As of match played 2 May 2026

Appearances and goals by club, season and competition
Club	Season	League			FA Cup		League Cup		Other		Total	
Club	Season	Division	Apps	Goals	Apps	Goals	Apps	Goals	Apps	Goals	Apps	Goals
Middlesbrough	2012–13	Championship	1	0	1	0	0	0	—		2	0
Middlesbrough	2013–14	Championship	1	0	0	0	0	0	—		1	0
Middlesbrough	2014–15	Championship	0	0	0	0	0	0	—		0	0
Middlesbrough	2015–16	Championship	0	0	0	0	0	0	—		0	0
Middlesbrough	2016–17	Premier League	0	0	0	0	0	0	—		0	0
Middlesbrough	Total		2	0	1	0	0	0	—		3	0
Burton Albion (loan)	2014–15	League Two	5	0	0	0	0	0	0	0	5	0
Coventry City (loan)	2015–16	League One	6	0	0	0	1	0	0	0	7	0
York City (loan)	2015–16	League Two	3	0	1	0	0	0	0	0	4	0
Walsall (loan)	2015–16	League One	1	0	0	0	0	0	0	0	1	0
Middlesbrough U23	2016–17	—			—		—		3 (Note: Appearance(s) in EFL Trophy)	0	3	0
Shrewsbury Town	2016–17	League One	13	0	0	0	0	0	0	0	13	0
Shrewsbury Town	2017–18	League One	18	0	2	0	0	0	10 (Note: Seven appearances in EFL Trophy, three in League One play-offs)	0	30	0
Shrewsbury Town	2018–19	League One	0	0	0	0	0	0	0	0	0	0
Shrewsbury Town	Total		31	0	2	0	0	0	10	0	43	0
Wycombe Wanderers (loan)	2018–19	League One	19	3	0	0	1	0	1	0	21	3
Portsmouth	2018–19	League One	7	1	1	0	0	0	0	0	8	1
Portsmouth	2019–20	League One	0	0	0	0	0	0	2	0	2	0
Portsmouth	2020–21	League One	9	0	2	0	2	0	5	0	18	0
Portsmouth	Total		16	1	3	0	2	0	7	0	28	1
Northampton Town (loan)	2020–21	League One	22	0	0	0	0	0	0	0	22	0
Burton Albion	2021–22	League One	7	0	0	0	0	0	3	0	10	0
Hartlepool United (loan)	2021–22	League Two	10	1	1	0	0	0	0	0	11	1
Grimsby Town	2022–23	League Two	31	2	7	0	2	0	2	0	42	2
Newport County	2023–24	League Two	46	7	6	1	2	0	3	0	57	8
Newport County	2024–25	League Two	19	3	0	0	0	0	2	0	21	3
Newport County	Total		65	10	6	1	2	0	5	0	78	11
Harrogate Town	2024–25	League Two	22	0	1	0	0	0	0	0	23	0
Harrogate Town	2025–26	League Two	42	3	1	0	1	0	4	0	48	3
Harrogate Town	Total		64	3	2	0	1	0	4	0	71	3
Career total			282	20	23	1	9	0	35	0	349	21

== Honours ==
Shrewsbury Town

- EFL Trophy runner-up: 2017–18
