= Harry Charsley =

Professional footballer

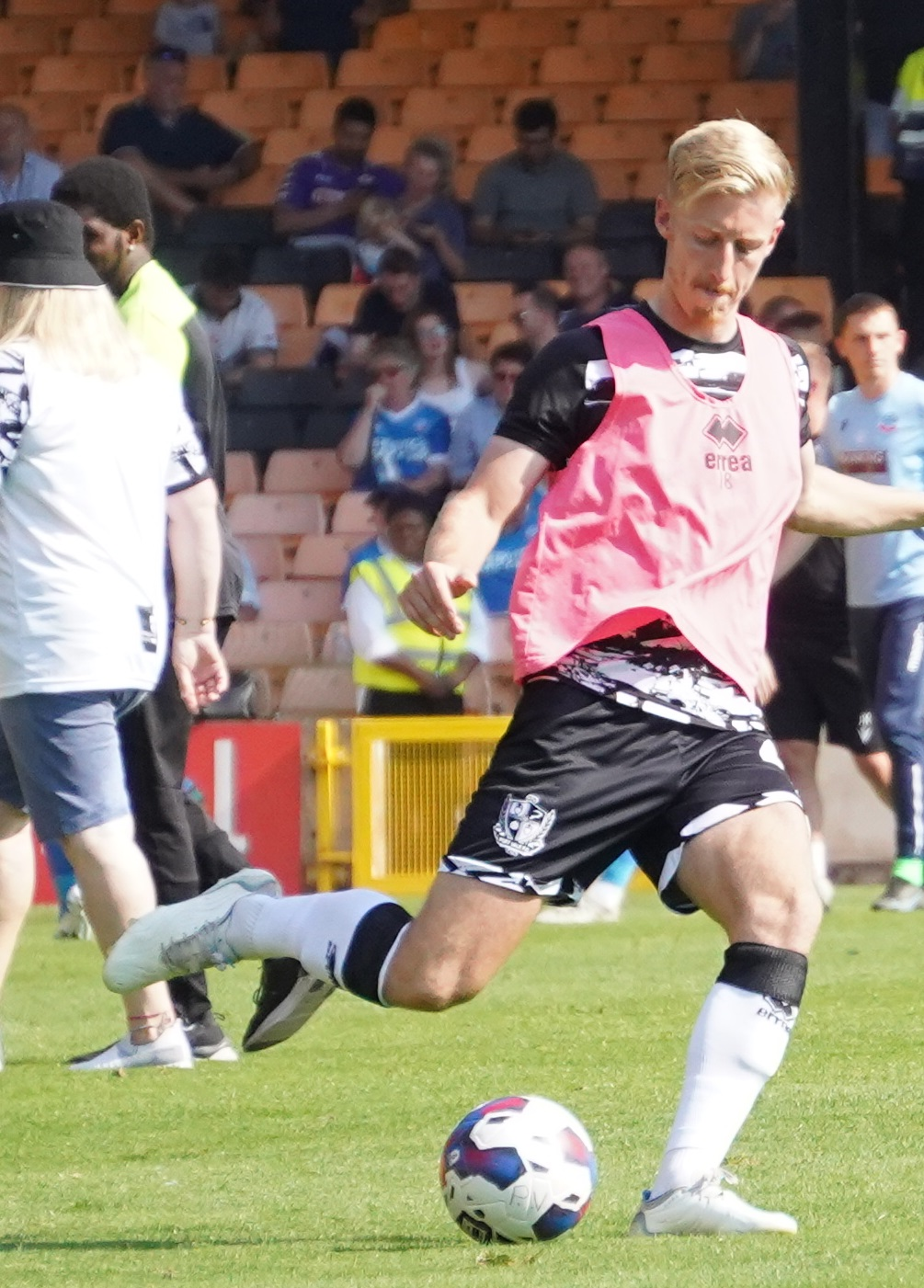
- Charsley playing for Port Vale in 2022

Personal information
- Full name: Henry William James Charsley
- Date of birth: 1 November 1996 (age 30)
- Place of birth: Wirral, England
- Height: 1.78 m (5 ft 10 in)
- Position: Midfielder

Team information
- Current team: Caernarfon Town
- Number: 18

Youth career
- 2005–2014: Everton

Senior career*
Years	Team	Apps	(Gls)
2014–2020	Everton	0	(0)
2018	→ Bolton Wanderers (loan)	1	(0)
2020–2022	Mansfield Town	68	(6)
2022–2023	Port Vale	26	(1)
2023–2024	Newport County	48	(7)
2024–2026	Oldham Athletic	11	(1)
2026	Truro City	21	(0)
2026–	Caernarfon Town	5	(2)

International career
2013	Republic of Ireland U17	2	(0)
2014–2015	Republic of Ireland U19	5	(0)
2016–2018	Republic of Ireland U21	10	(2)
- * Club domestic league appearances and goals as of 08:27, 8 November 2026 (UTC)

Henry William James Charsley (born 1 November 1996) is a professional footballer who plays as a midfielder for Cymru Premier club Caernarfon Town. Born in Wirral, England, Charsley represented the Republic of Ireland up to under-21 level.

Charsley came through the Academy at Everton and turned professional at the club in July 2014. He helped the youth team to win two Premier League 2 titles. He appeared in one first-team game in the Europa League in December 2017. He also featured in one game on loan at Championship club Bolton Wanderers the following month. He signed with Mansfield Town in January 2020 and made 77 appearances during a two-year stay before moving to Port Vale for an undisclosed fee. He helped the club to win promotion out of League Two via the play-offs in 2022, though struggled for game time in League One and moved on to Newport County in January 2023. He dropped into non-League football with Oldham Athletic in July 2024. He joined Truro City for a brief spell in January 2026. He entered the Welsh leagues with Caernarfon Town in October 2026.

== Club career ==
=== Everton ===
Charsley joined the Academy at Everton at the age of nine. He was part of the squad that won the Under-18 Premier League title in the 2013–14 season and scored the only goal of the game against Manchester City in the knockout final at Goodison Park. After progressing through the ranks of the academy, he signed his first professional two-year contract with the club in July 2014. Charsley was named as Everton Under-18s Player of the Season and won the team's Goal of the Season award. In July 2016, he signed a one-year contract extension with the club. He scored three goals in his first five matches for the under-23 side in the 2016–17 season. He scored on his debut against a senior team in a competitive game on 8 November 2016, in 1–1 draw with Blackpool in the EFL Trophy, which ended in a 5–4 defeat in the penalty shoot-out. He top-scored with 12 goals in 23 games to help David Unsworth's under-23 team to win the 2016–17 Premier League 2 title. In April 2017, Charsley signed a two-year contract extension.

On 7 December 2017, Charsley made his first-team debut under Sam Allardyce, starting in a 3–0 win at Apollon Limassol in the Europa League. Local newspaper, the Daily Post, said that he "grew in confidence at left-back." He played nine further games for the under-23s in the EFL Trophy, but would never make another first-team appearance. On 12 January 2018, Charsley moved to Championship side Bolton Wanderers on loan until the end of the 2017–18 season, joining Everton compatriot Antonee Robinson at the Macron Stadium. Charsley made his Bolton Wanderers debut the following day in a 2–0 loss against Brentford, where he started the match before coming off as a substitute in the second-half after playing 55 minutes. Manager Phil Parkinson said: "It didn't quite drop for him but there were a lot of good things." This was the only game Charsley played before returning to Everton. He played every game of the under-23s' 2018–19 Premier League 2 title win. In June 2019, it was announced that Charsley would be released by Everton when his contract expired at the end of the month. Despite this, Charsley was given a new short-term contract until January 2020 a gesture of goodwill after he was sidelined with a spinal injury. Having returned to fitness, he played a further 14 times for the youth team before his short-term contract expired and he left the "Toffees" for good after 15 years.

=== Mansfield Town ===
On 17 January 2020, Charsley joined League Two club Mansfield Town on a deal until the end of the season. He featured nine times in the second half of the 2019–20 season, which was ended early due to the COVID-19 pandemic in England with Graham Coughlan's side finishing in 21st-place on points per game. On 5 February 2021, Charsley signed a new 18-month contract with the club. He made 48 appearances in the 2020–21 campaign, scoring five goals, as Mansfield posted a 16th-place finish. On 15 January 2022, he scored both goals in a 2–0 victory over Walsall.

In total, he scored seven goals and provided eight assists in 77 appearances for the "Stags". Reflecting on the decision to let him leave the club, manager Nigel Clough said that "it would have been very, very selfish" to insist that he stay at Field Mill when he could not guarantee him much playing time.

=== Port Vale ===
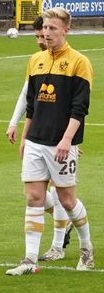
Charsley with Port Vale in 2022

On 28 January 2022, Charsley joined League Two side Port Vale for an undisclosed fee. Manager Darrell Clarke had looked to strengthen the midfield department after injuries to Tom Conlon and Jake Taylor. Charlsey was part of a midfield three of Tom Pett and Ben Garrity that helped the "Valiants" to put together a winning run in March. He scored his first goal for the "Valiants" on 5 April, to secure a 1–0 victory at Salford City. He played as a substitute in the play-off final at Wembley Stadium as Vale secured promotion with a 3–0 victory over Mansfield Town; Michael Baggaley of The Sentinel wrote that "[Charsley put in] a typically dynamic performance against his old club". He made ten appearances in the first half of the 2022–23 season, but left the club by mutual consent in January 2023 after securing a deal elsewhere;director of football David Flitcroft said that "Harry's ability in training has been high, but due to the competition in front of him the minutes on the pitch haven't been available".

=== Newport County ===
On 17 January 2023, Charsley joined League Two club Newport County on an 18-month contract; the move reunited him with Graham Coughlan, his former manager at Mansfield. He made his debut at Rodney Parade in a 2–1 win over Swindon Town on 4 February. He scored his first goal for Newport in a 2–1 defeat at Salford City on 4 March. He scored two goals in 16 games in the second half of the 2022–23 season.

In September 2023 he injured his ankle in training and was ruled out of action for up to ten weeks. He recovered and went on play 39 games in the 2023–24 season, scoring five goals and featuring in the FA Cup third round defeat to Manchester United.

=== Oldham Athletic ===
On 2 July 2024, Charsley joined National League club Oldham Athletic on a two-year deal after manager Micky Mellon worked hard to tempt him to drop into non-League football. He scored on his debut for Oldham on 10 August, in a 3–0 win over Braintree Town at Boundary Park. He endured a stop-start 2024–25 season due to injury and missed the second half of the campaign after undergoing hip surgery. The injury caused him to miss the club's promotion through the play-offs, as well as pre-season in the summer of 2025. He played one EFL Trophy game in the first half of the 2025–26 season as he returned to fitness.

=== Truro City ===
On 2 January 2026, Charsley returned to the National League, joining Truro City on a free transfer, signing what was reported to be an eighteen-month contract for a club second from bottom in the table. He played 22 games in the second half of the 2025–26 campaign, which ended in relegation. He was released upon the expiry of his contract. He was part of the 39-man Professional Footballers' Association (PFA) free agent squad in July 2026.

=== Caernarfon Town ===
On 3 October 2026, Charlsey joined Cymru Premier club Caernarfon Town.

== International career ==
Charsley was born on the Wirral in England, but is eligible to represent the Republic of Ireland as his mother is from County Offaly. He played for the Republic of Ireland at various age levels, from under-17 level to under-21 level. After representing the under-17s in 2013, Charsley was called up to the under-19s to make his debut on 9 September 2014, in a 1–0 win over Netherlands U19. After previously being called up by under-21s in June 2015, Charsley was called up for a second time in late-August. He scored his first goal for the under-21s in a 2–1 win over Slovenia U21 on 2 September. A year later, on 9 October 2017, he scored his second goal for the under-21s in a 4–0 win over Israel U21.

== Style of play ==
Charsley is considered a versatile player who is best utilised in any attacking midfield position. He has been noted for his energy and technical abilities in midfield.

== Career statistics ==
As of end of the 2025–26 season

Appearances and goals by club, season and competition
Club	Season	League			National cup (Note: Includes FA Cup, Welsh Cup)		League cup (Note: Includes EFL Cup, Welsh League Cup)		Other		Total	
Club	Season	Division	Apps	Goals	Apps	Goals	Apps	Goals	Apps	Goals	Apps	Goals
Everton	2017–18	Premier League	0	0	0	0	0	0	1 (Note: Appearance in the Europa League)	0	1	0
Everton U23	2016–17	—	—		—		—		1 (Note: Appearances in the EFL Trophy)	1	1	1
Everton U23	2017–18	—	—		—		—		3	0	3	0
Everton U23	2018–19	—	—		—		—		2	0	2	0
Everton U23	2019–20	—	—		—		—		4	0	4	0
Everton U23	Total		0	0	0	0	0	0	10	1	10	1
Bolton Wanderers (loan)	2017–18	Championship	1	0	—		—		—		1	0
Mansfield Town	2019–20	League Two	9	0	0	0	0	0	0	0	9	0
Mansfield Town	2020–21	League Two	43	4	3	1	1	0	1	0	48	5
Mansfield Town	2021–22	League Two	16	2	2	0	0	0	2	0	20	2
Mansfield Town	Total		68	6	5	1	1	0	3	0	77	7
Port Vale	2021–22	League Two	20	1	—		—		3 (Note: Appearances in the play-offs)	0	23	1
Port Vale	2022–23	League One	6	0	1	0	0	0	3	0	10	0
Port Vale	Total		26	1	1	0	0	0	6	0	33	1
Newport County	2022–23	League Two	16	2	0	0	0	0	0	0	16	2
Newport County	2023–24	League Two	32	5	5	0	2	0	0	0	39	5
Newport County	Total		48	7	5	0	2	0	0	0	55	7
Oldham Athletic	2024–25	National League	11	1	0	0	—		3 (Note: 2 appearances and 1 goal in the National League Cup, 1 appearance in the FA Trophy)	1	14	2
Oldham Athletic	2025–26	League Two	0	0	0	0	0	0	1	0	1	0
Oldham Athletic	Total		11	1	0	0	0	0	4	1	15	2
Truro City	2025–26	National League	21	0	—		—		1 (Note: Appearance in the National League Cup)	0	22	0
Caernarfon Town	2026–27	Cymru Premier	0	0	0	0	0	0	0	0	0	0
Career total			175	15	11	1	3	0	25	2	212	18

== Honours ==
Everton U23

- Premier League 2: 2016–17, 2018–19

Port Vale

- EFL League Two play-offs: 2022
