= Matt Baker (footballer, born 2003) =

Welsh footballer (born 2003)

Personal information
- Full name: Matthew Baker
- Date of birth: 6 February 2003 (age 23)
- Place of birth: Kent, England
- Height: 1.86 m (6 ft 1 in)
- Position: Defender

Team information
- Current team: Notts County
- Number: 44

Youth career
- 2011–2021: Gillingham
- 2021–2022: Stoke City

Senior career*
| Years | Team | Apps | (Gls) |
| 2022–2024 | Stoke City | 0 | (0) |
| 2023 | → Newport County (loan) | 18 | (0) |
| 2023–2024 | → Newport County (loan) | 32 | (0) |
| 2024–2026 | Newport County | 79 | (5) |
| 2026– | Notts County | 2 | (0) |

International career^{‡}
- Wales U17
- Wales U19
| 2023–2024 | Wales U21 | 8 | (0) |
- * Club domestic league appearances and goals as of 20:18, 22 September 2026 (UTC) ‡ National team caps and goals as of 18:10, 15 October 2024 (UTC)

Matthew Baker (born 6 February 2003) is a professional footballer who plays as a defender for EFL League One club Notts County. He is a former Wales under-21 international.

== Club career ==
=== Stoke City ===
Baker progressed through the Gillingham youth system and signed for Stoke City in June 2021. He moved on loan to Newport County in January 2023 for the remainder of the 2022–23 season. He made his Football League debut for Newport on 14 February 2023 in the League Two 2–2 draw against Stevenage. Baker made 18 appearances for Newport helping them finish in 15th position. In September 2023 Baker re-joined Newport County on loan for the 2023–24 season. Baker made 39 appearances for the Exiles as they finished in 18th position. In May 2024, Stoke City offered Baker a contract extension.

=== Newport County ===
On 1 July 2024, Baker returned to Newport County on a permanent two-year deal after both clubs had reached a compensation agreement. Baker scored his first goal for Newport on 17 August 2024 in the 3–1 EFL League Two win against Doncaster Rovers. He was selected as Newport County Young Player of the Year for the 2024–25 season Baker was offered a new contract by Newport at the end of the 2025-26 season but he chose to move on.

=== Notts County ===
On 17 July 2026, Baker joined newly promoted League One club Notts County on an initial two-year deal, a compensation package having been agreed with Newport County.

== International career ==
Baker is from Kent and qualifies for Wales through his mother who was born in Narberth, Pembrokeshire. He is a Wales youth international and captained them at under-19 level. On 26 March 2023 Baker made his Wales under-21 debut in the starting line-up for the 3–0 friendly match win against Scotland under-21 in Spain. He later became under-21 captain.

In June 2024 Baker was called up to the Wales senior squad for the first time.

== Career statistics ==
As of match played 22 September 2026

Appearances and goals by club, season and competition
| Club | Season | League | | | FA Cup | | League Cup | | Other | | Total | |
| Club | Season | Division | Apps | Goals | Apps | Goals | Apps | Goals | Apps | Goals | Apps | Goals |
|---|---|---|---|---|---|---|---|---|---|---|---|---|
| Stoke City | 2022–23 | Championship | 0 | 0 | 0 | 0 | 0 | 0 | — | | 0 | 0 |
| Stoke City | 2023–24 | Championship | 0 | 0 | 0 | 0 | 0 | 0 | — | | 0 | 0 |
| Stoke City | Total | | 0 | 0 | 0 | 0 | 0 | 0 | 0 | 0 | 0 | 0 |
| Newport County (loan) | 2022–23 | League Two | 18 | 0 | 0 | 0 | 0 | 0 | 0 | 0 | 18 | 0 |
| Newport County (loan) | 2023–24 | League Two | 32 | 0 | 5 | 0 | 0 | 0 | 2 (Note: Appearance(s) in the EFL Trophy.) | 0 | 39 | 0 |
| Newport County | 2024–25 | League Two | 41 | 4 | 1 | 0 | 1 | 0 | 3 | 0 | 46 | 4 |
| Newport County | 2025–26 | League Two | 38 | 1 | 0 | 0 | 2 | 0 | 1 | 0 | 41 | 1 |
| Newport County | Total | | 79 | 5 | 1 | 0 | 3 | 0 | 4 | 0 | 87 | 5 |
| Notts County | 2026–27 | League One | 2 | 0 | 0 | 0 | 0 | 0 | 1 | 0 | 3 | 0 |
| Career total | | | 131 | 5 | 6 | 0 | 3 | 0 | 7 | 0 | 147 | 5 |
