= Kiban Rai =

Welsh footballer

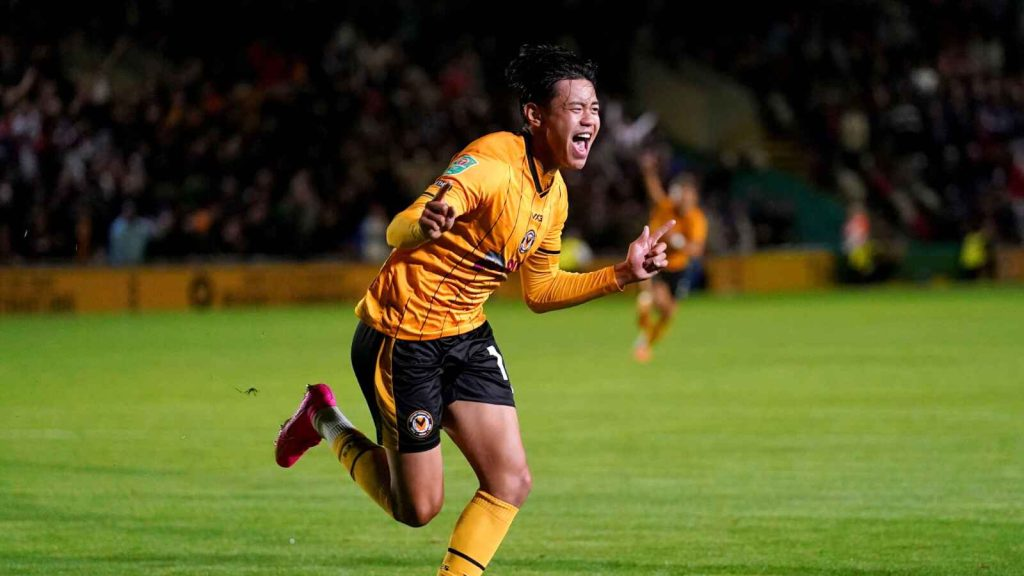
- Rai after scoring against Brentford in the EFL Cup in 2023

Personal information
- Full name: Kiban Hang Rai
- Date of birth: 24 October 2004 (age 22)
- Place of birth: Brecon, Wales
- Height: 5 ft 11 in (1.80 m)
- Position: Midfielder

Team information
- Current team: Hampton & Richmond Borough
- Number: 17

Youth career
- –2021: Brecon Corinthians
- 2021–2023: Newport County

Senior career*
| Years | Team | Apps | (Gls) |
| 2023–2025 | Newport County | 21 | (0) |
| 2025 | → Merthyr Town (loan) | 4 | (1) |
| 2025–2026 | Aldershot Town | 18 | (0) |
| 2026 | → Merthyr Town (loan) | 13 | (3) |
| 2026– | Hampton & Richmond Borough | 0 | (0) |
- * Club domestic league appearances and goals as of 21:05, 29 June 2026 (UTC)

Kiban Hang Rai (born 24 October 2004) is a Welsh professional footballer who plays as a midfielder for National League South club Hampton & Richmond Borough.

== Career ==
Rai joined the youth academy of Newport County at under-15 level from Brecon Corinthians. He made his senior debut for Newport in the 3–1 EFL League Two away defeat to Salford City at Moor Lane on 5 March 2023 as a second-half substitute for Nathan Moriah-Welsh. In June 2023 Rai signed his first professional contract with Newport County On 29 August 2023 Rai scored his first goal for Newport, the 96th minute equaliser in the EFL Cup 1–1 draw against Brentford of the Premier League, which Brentford won on penalties. On 30 January 2025 Rai joined Southern League club Merthyr Town on loan for the remainder of the 2024-25 season. He was released by Newport County at the end of the 2024-25 season.

On 25 June 2025, Rai agreed to join National League side Aldershot Town. On 3 February 2026, Rai agreed to return to Merthyr Town on loan for the remainder of the 2025–26 season. On 17 July 2026, it was confirmed that Rai would leave the club at the end of his contract despite featuring in their pre-season fixtures.

On 31 July 2026, Rai agreed to join National League South side, Hampton & Richmond Borough following a successful trial period.

== Career statistics ==
As of 14 March 2026

Appearances and goals by club, season and competition
| Club | Season | League | | | FA Cup | | League Cup | | Other | | Total | |
| Club | Season | Division | Apps | Goals | Apps | Goals | Apps | Goals | Apps | Goals | Apps | Goals |
|---|---|---|---|---|---|---|---|---|---|---|---|---|
| Newport County | 2022–23 | League Two | 4 | 0 | 0 | 0 | 0 | 0 | 0 | 0 | 4 | 0 |
| Newport County | 2023–24 | League Two | 14 | 0 | 3 | 0 | 1 | 1 | 2 (Note: Appearance(s) in EFL Trophy) | 0 | 20 | 1 |
| Newport County | 2024–25 | League Two | 4 | 0 | 0 | 0 | 1 | 0 | 1 | 0 | 6 | 0 |
| Newport County | Total | | 22 | 0 | 3 | 0 | 2 | 1 | 3 | 0 | 30 | 1 |
| Merthyr Town (loan) | 2024–25 | Southern League Premier Division South | 4 | 1 | — | | — | | — | | 4 | 1 |
| Aldershot Town | 2025–26 | National League | 18 | 0 | 1 | 1 | — | | 4 (Note: Appearance(s) in National League Cup) | 1 | 23 | 2 |
| Merthyr Town (loan) | 2025–26 | National League North | 13 | 3 | — | | — | | — | | 13 | 3 |
| Hampton & Richmond Borough | 2026–27 | National League South | 0 | 0 | 0 | 0 | — | | 0 | 0 | 0 | 0 |
| Career total | | | 57 | 4 | 4 | 1 | 2 | 1 | 7 | 1 | 70 | 7 |

== Personal life ==
Rai was born in Brecon, Wales, and he also qualifies to represent Nepal through his parents. His father was a British Army Gurkha and in 2023 Kiban Rai became the first player of Nepalese descent to sign a professional contract in the Premier League or EFL when he joined Newport County.

== Style of play ==
Rai operates as a striker or attacking midfielder. He is known for his creativity and technical ability.

== Honours ==
Merthyr Town

- Southern League Premier Division South Champion: 2024-2025
