= Luke Jephcott =

Welsh footballer (born 2000)

Personal information
- Full name: Luke Owen Jephcott
- Date of birth: 26 January 2000 (age 26)
- Place of birth: Aberystwyth, Wales
- Height: 5 ft 10 in (1.77 m)
- Position: Striker

Team information
- Current team: Truro City

Youth career
- 2007–2013: Wendron United
- 2013–2014: Helston Athletic
- 2014–2019: Plymouth Argyle

Senior career*
Years	Team	Apps	(Gls)
2018–2023	Plymouth Argyle	106	(33)
2019–2020	→ Truro City (loan)	18	(8)
2022–2023	→ Swindon Town (loan)	32	(7)
2023–2024	St Johnstone	8	(0)
2024–2025	Newport County	28	(0)
2025	→ Truro City (loan)	17	(6)
2025–	Truro City	0	(0)

International career^{‡}
2018–2019	Wales U19	7	(4)
2020–2022	Wales U21	12	(4)
- * Club domestic league appearances and goals as of 08:07, 19 May 2025 (UTC) ‡ National team caps and goals as of 21:13, 22 October 2022 (UTC)

Luke Owen Jephcott (born 26 January 2000) is a Welsh professional footballer who plays as a striker for Truro City. He is a former Wales under-21 international.

== Club career ==
=== Plymouth Argyle ===
Whilst still an apprentice, Jephcott made his professional debut in the EFL League One on 20 October 2018. He featured against Burton Albion in a 3–2 defeat, replacing Stuart O'Keefe in the 86th minute. Jephcott's full debut came ten days later, when he started in a 5-0 EFL Trophy defeat to Chelsea U21s.

In August 2019, Jephcott joined Truro City on loan. He was recalled by his parent club, Plymouth Argyle, in January 2020.

Jephcott won both the EFL League Two Player of the Month and EFL Young Player of the Month awards for January 2020, after scoring 5 goals in 4 starts in January 2020. Jephcott finished the season with 7 goals in 14 games as Plymouth won promotion to League One.

Jepchott started the 2020-21 League One season strongly by scoring the winner for Plymouth on the opening day against Blackpool. He scored 1 in the next 7 games before starting a sensational run of form, scoring 14 goals in the next 18 league games, which attracted interest from a clutch of Championship clubs including Stoke City and Cardiff City.

On 1 September 2022, Jephcott signed for EFL League Two club Swindon Town on an initial loan deal with the option to join the club permanently.

He was released by Plymouth following their promotion to the EFL Championship at the end of the 2022–23 season.

=== St Johnstone ===
On 21 July 2023, Jephcott signed a two-year deal with Scottish Premiership club St Johnstone.

=== Newport County ===
On 25 January 2024 Jephcott joined EFL League Two club Newport County on a free transfer He made his debut for Newport County in the 2-1 League Two win against Swindon Town on 3 February 2024 as a second half substitute. He was released by Newport County at the end of the 2024-25 season.

==== Truro City (loan) ====
On 4 February 2025 Jephcott rejoined Truro City on loan for the remainder of the 2024-25 season. He scored his first goal on his return to the club on his debut in the 1-3 win over Hampton & Richmond Borough.

=== Truro City ===
Following Truro’s promotion to the National League for the 2025-2026 season, Jephcott then signed a two year contract with Truro City.

== International career ==
On 9 September 2018 Jephcott made his Wales U19 debut in a friendly against Ireland U19s at the City Calling Stadium. Wales won the game 1–0.

Jephcott was first called up to the Wales U19 team in 2018. He made his debut for Wales Under 21s in a 3–0 win against Moldova.

== Career statistics ==
As of match played 26 April 2025

Appearances and goals by club, season and competition
Club	Season	League			FA Cup		League Cup		Other		Total	
Club	Season	Division	Apps	Goals	Apps	Goals	Apps	Goals	Apps	Goals	Apps	Goals
Plymouth Argyle	2018–19	League One	9	0	0	0	0	0	1 (Note: Appearance(s) in EFL Trophy)	0	10	0
Plymouth Argyle	2019–20	League Two	14	7	0	0	0	0	0	0	14	7
Plymouth Argyle	2020–21	League One	41	16	4	2	0	0	1	0	46	18
Plymouth Argyle	2021–22	League One	40	10	1	0	2	1	0	0	43	11
Plymouth Argyle	2022–23	League One	2	0	0	0	1	0	0	0	3	0
Total			106	33	5	2	3	1	2	0	118	37
Truro City (loan)	2019–20	Southern Football League Premier South	18	5	2	0	—		1 (Note: Appearance(s) in FA Trophy)	0	21	5
Swindon Town (loan)	2022–23	League Two	32	7	1	0	0	0	0	0	33	7
St Johnstone	2023–24	Scottish Premiership	7	0	0	0	3	0	0	0	10	0
Newport County	2023–24	League Two	16	0	0	0	0	0	0	0	16	0
Newport County	2024–25	League Two	12	0	0	0	1	0	2	0	15	0
Total			28	0	0	0	1	0	2	0	31	0
Truro City (loan)	2024–25	National League South	17	6	0	0	—		0	0	17	6
Career total			208	51	8	2	7	1	5	0	230	55

== Honours ==
Individual

- EFL League Two Player of the Month: January 2020
