= Matthew Bondswell =

English footballer (born 2002)

Personal information
- Full name: Matthew Joshua Bondswell
- Date of birth: 18 April 2002 (age 24)
- Place of birth: Nottingham, England
- Position: Left-back

Team information
- Current team: Spalding United

Youth career
- 2010–2018: Nottingham Forest
- 2018–2020: RB Leipzig

Senior career*
| Years | Team | Apps | (Gls) |
| 2020–2021 | RB Leipzig | 0 | (0) |
| 2020–2021 | → FC Dordrecht (loan) | 6 | (0) |
| 2021–2024 | Newcastle United | 0 | (0) |
| 2022 | → Shrewsbury Town (loan) | 0 | (0) |
| 2023–2024 | → Newport County (loan) | 32 | (0) |
| 2024–2025 | Hartlepool United | 1 | (0) |
| 2025 | Peterborough Sports | 11 | (0) |
| 2025– | Spalding United | 12 | (0) |

International career^{‡}
| 2016 | England U15 | 2 | (0) |
| 2017–2018 | England U16 | 6 | (0) |
| 2018–2019 | England U17 | 6 | (0) |
| 2019 | England U18 | 5 | (0) |
- * Club domestic league appearances and goals as of 22:10, 22 May 2026 (UTC) ‡ National team caps and goals as of 11:44, 30 August 2020 (UTC)

Matthew Bondswell (born 18 April 2002) is an English footballer who plays as a left-back for Spalding United.

== Club career ==
After spending time in the academy of Nottingham Forest, Bondswell joined the academy of Bundesliga side Leipzig in the summer of 2018.

On 21 August 2020, Bondswell joined Eerste Divisie side Dordrecht on a season-long loan deal. On 30 August 2020, he made his professional debut, playing the full match in a 0–0 draw with Go Ahead Eagles. On 15 January 2021, it was announced that his loan at Dordrecht had been terminated.

On 19 March 2021, a month after leaving Leipzig, Bondswell signed with Newcastle United, initially joining the club's under-23 squad.

On 31 January 2022, Bondswell joined League One club Shrewsbury Town on loan until the end of the season. On 28 March 2022, Bondswell was recalled by Newcastle United as he was unable to make his EFL debut for Shrewsbury Town, featuring as an unused substitute in 11 consecutive league matches.

On 28 June 2023, Bondswell joined League Two club Newport County on loan for the 2023–24 season. He made his debut for Newport on 5 August 2023 as a second-half substitute against Accrington Stanley. He made 40 appearances for Newport in total with 27 of those coming as a substitute.

On 29 May 2024, Newcastle announced he would be released in the summer when his contract expired.

On 15 November 2024, Bondswell joined National League side Hartlepool United. He departed the club in January 2025 upon the expiration of his short-term contract.

In March 2025, Bondswell joined National League North side Peterborough Sports on a non-contract basis.

== International career ==
Bondswell has so far represented England up to under-18 level and also competed with the under-17 side the 2019 UEFA European Under-17 Championship in the Republic of Ireland.

== Career statistics ==
As of match played 15 November 2025

Appearances and goals by club, season and competition
| Club | Season | League | | | Cup | | Continental | | Other | | Total | |
| Club | Season | Division | Apps | Goals | Apps | Goals | Apps | Goals | Apps | Goals | Apps | Goals |
|---|---|---|---|---|---|---|---|---|---|---|---|---|
| RB Leipzig | 2020–21 | Bundesliga | 0 | 0 | 0 | 0 | 0 | 0 | 0 | 0 | 0 | 0 |
| FC Dordrecht (loan) | 2020–21 | Eerste Divisie | 6 | 0 | 1 | 0 | – | | 0 | 0 | 7 | 0 |
| Newcastle United U23 | 2021–22 | — | | | — | | — | | 2 (Note: Appearances in EFL Trophy) | 0 | 2 | 0 |
| Newcastle United U23 | 2022–23 | — | | | — | | — | | 2 | 0 | 2 | 0 |
| Newcastle United U23 | 2023–24 | — | | | — | | — | | 0 | 0 | 0 | 0 |
| Newcastle United U23 | Total | | | | — | | — | | 4 | 0 | 4 | 0 |
| Newport County (loan) | 2023–24 | League Two | 32 | 0 | 3 | 0 | 2 | 0 | 3 | 0 | 40 | 0 |
| Hartlepool United | 2024–25 | National League | 1 | 0 | 0 | 0 | 0 | 0 | 1 | 0 | 2 | 0 |
| Peterborough Sports | 2024–25 | National League North | 11 | 0 | 0 | 0 | – | | 0 | 0 | 11 | 0 |
| Spalding United | 2025–26 | Southern League Premier Central | 12 | 0 | 0 | 0 | – | | 0 | 0 | 12 | 0 |
| Career total | | | 62 | 0 | 4 | 0 | 2 | 0 | 8 | 0 | 76 | 0 |
