= Harrison Bright =

Welsh footballer (born 2004)

Personal information
- Full name: Harrison William Bright
- Date of birth: 23 February 2004 (age 22)
- Place of birth: Blaenavon, Wales
- Position: Defender

Team information
- Current team: Cambrian United
- Number: 40

Youth career
- Newport County

Senior career*
Years	Team	Apps	(Gls)
2020–2024	Newport County	10	(0)
2023	→ Pontypridd United	7	(0)
2023	→ Barry Town United	15	(2)
2024–2025	Barry Town United	13	(2)
2025–2026	Llanelli Town	26	(0)
2026–	Cambrian United	13	(1)
- * Club domestic league appearances and goals as of 07:45, 8 November 2026 (UTC)

Harrison Bright is a Welsh footballer who plays as a defender for Cymru Premier club Cambrian United.

== Career ==
Bright made his senior debut for Newport on 6 October 2020 in the 5-0 EFL Trophy defeat to Norwich City Under 21's as a second-half replacement for Robbie Willmott. He made his second appearance for Newport on 10 November 2020 in the 3–1 EFL Trophy defeat to Plymouth Argyle as a half time substitute for Scot Bennett. Bright made his football league debut for Newport on 7 May 2022 in the EFL League Two 2–0 defeat to Rochdale as a second-half substitute. In May 2022 he signed his first professional contract with Newport County

On 31 January 2023 Bright joined Pontypridd United on loan for the remainder of the 2022–23 season. In June 2023 his Newport contract was extended to the end of the 2023–24 season. On 31 August 2023 Bright joined Barry Town United on loan for the remainder of the 2023–24 season. On 1 January 2024 Bright was recalled from his loan by Newport.

Bright was released by Newport County at the end of the 2023-34 season.

In August 2024, Bright joined Barry Town United in a permanent move.

After time with Llanelli in summer 2026 he joined Cambrian United.

== International ==
Bright was called up to the Wales Under-18 squad for the Croatia tournament in June 2022.

== Career statistics ==
As of match played 16 January 2024

Appearances and goals by club, season and competition
Club	Season	League			Domestic Cup (Note: Includes Welsh Cup)		League Cup (Note: Includes EFL Cup)		Europe		Other		Total	
Club	Season	Division	Apps	Goals	Apps	Goals	Apps	Goals	Apps	Goals	Apps	Goals	Apps	Goals
Newport County	2020–21	League Two	0	0	0	0	0	0	—		2 (Note: Appearance(s) in EFL Trophy)	0	2	0
Newport County	2021–22	League Two	1	0	0	0	0	0	—		2	0	3	0
Newport County	2022–23	League Two	0	0	0	0	1	0	—		1	0	2	0
Newport County	2023–24	League Two	0	0	0	0	1	0	—		0	0	1	0
Newport County	Total		1	0	0	0	2	0	0	0	5	0	8	0
Pontypridd United (loan)	2023–24	Cymru Premier	7	0	0	0	0	0	—		0	0	7	0
Barry Town (loan)	2023–24	Cymru Premier	15	2	1	0	0	0	—		—		16	2
Career Total			23	2	1	0	2	0	0	0	5	0	31	2
