= Geoffroy Bony =

Welsh footballer

Personal information
- Date of birth: 24 December 2004 (age 21)
- Position: Forward

Youth career
- 2019–2023: Swansea City
- 2023–2024: Nice

Senior career*
Years	Team	Apps	(Gls)
2024–2025	Newport County	6	(0)
- * Club domestic league appearances and goals as of 08:00, 19 May 2025 (UTC)

Geoffroy Bony (born 24 December 2004) is a Welsh footballer who plays as a forward.

== Career ==
Bony spent his early career with the youth teams of Swansea City and Nice. On 22 November 2024 he joined EFL League Two club Newport County on a contract until the end of the 2024-25 season. Bony made his English Football League debut for Newport the following day on 23 November 2024 in the 0–0 draw against Notts County. He was released by Newport County at the end of the 2024-25 season.

== Personal life ==
Bony is the son of former Ivory Coast international Wilfried Bony. His younger brother Orphee Bony is a development squad player with Newport County.
