= Hamzad Kargbo =

English footballer

Personal information
- Full name: Hamzad Sayeed Kargbo
- Date of birth: 20 January 2002 (age 24)
- Place of birth: England
- Height: 1.93 m (6 ft 4 in)
- Position: Forward

Team information
- Current team: Stenhousemuir

Youth career
- –2014: Mass Elite Academy
- 2014–2021: Queens Park Rangers

Senior career*
Years	Team	Apps	(Gls)
2021–2024	Queens Park Rangers	0	(0)
2021–2022	→ Southend United (loan)	5	(0)
2021–2022	→ Oxford City (loan)	3	(0)
2024–2025	Newport County	2	(0)
2025	→ Chippenham Town (loan)	8	(2)
2025–2026	Maidstone United	33	(7)
2026	Inverness Caledonian Thistle	0	(0)
2026–	Stenhousemuir	1	(0)
- * Club domestic league appearances and goals as of 10:45, 5 September 2026 (UTC)

Hamzad Sayeed Kargbo (born 20 January 2002) is an English footballer who plays as a striker for club Stenhousemuir.

== Career ==
=== Queens Park Rangers ===
Kargbo joined the Queens Park Rangers academy aged twelve from Elite Mass Academy, progressing through the ranks to sign a scholarship in 2018.

In August 2021, Kargbo joined National League side Southend United on loan until the end of September 2021, later extended for a further month.

In March 2022, Kargbo joined National League South club Oxford City on loan for the remainder of the season.

Following the conclusion of the 2023–24 season, Kargbo was confirmed to be among those leaving the club.

=== Newport County ===
In June 2024, Kargbo joined League Two club Newport County following a successful trial period. On 10 August 2024, he made his debut in the 2024–25 season opening day 3–2 defeat to Cheltenham Town as an 85th minute substitute, suffering a dislocated shoulder that would require surgery and rule him out for an estimated period of three months.

On 20 January 2025, Kargbo joined National League South club Chippenham Town for the remainder of the 2024–25 season. On 18 March, he returned to his parent club after suffering an injury. He was released by Newport County at the end of the 2024-25 season.

=== Maidstone United ===
In September 2025, Kargbo joined National League South club Maidstone United.

=== Inverness Caledonian Thistle ===
After a successful trial period, where he scored on his first outing in a friendly vs Nairn County, Kargbo signed a one year deal with Scottish Championship side, Inverness Caledonian Thistle on 4 July 2026. However, on 4 September 2026, Kargbo terminated his contract by mutual consent.

=== Stenhousemuir ===
On 5 September 2026, having signed for the club the previous day and appeared as a substitute that evening in a 1–0 victory over Livingston, Scottish Championship club Stenhousemuir officially announced the signing of Kargbo.
