= Joe Thomas (footballer, born 2002) =

Welsh footballer

Personal information
- Full name: Joe Ethan Thomas
- Date of birth: 12 March 2002 (age 24)
- Place of birth: Treorchy, Wales
- Height: 1.95 m (6 ft 5 in)
- Position: Full back

Team information
- Current team: Newport County
- Number: 12

Youth career
- 2015–2020: Cambrian & Clydach

Senior career*
Years	Team	Apps	(Gls)
2020–2022	Cambrian & Clydach	12	(3)
2022–2024	Swansea City	0	(0)
2024–	Newport County	62	(2)
- * Club domestic league appearances and goals as of 09:03, 3 November 2026 (UTC)

Joe Thomas is a Welsh footballer who plays as a full-back or wing-back for EFL League Two club Newport County.

== Career ==
Thomas joined Swansea City's under-21 squad in January 2022 from Cambrian & Clydach and in July 2024 he joined EFL League Two club Newport County on a two-year contract. Thomas made his debut for Newport on 12 November 2024 in the starting line-up for the 3-0 EFL Trophy defeat to Reading. He made his English Football League debut for Newport on 23 November 2024 in the 0–0 draw against Notts County. Thomas scored his first goal for Newport on 4 February 2025 in the EFL League Two 2-1 win against Morecambe.
