= Jac Norris =

Welsh footballer (born 2006)

Personal information
- Full name: Jac Norris
- Date of birth: 9 November 2006 (age 20)
- Position: Midfielder

Team information
- Current team: Bristol Manor Farm

Youth career
- Cwmbran Celtic
- –2023: Newport County

Senior career*
Years	Team	Apps	(Gls)
2023–2026	Newport County	3	(0)
2025	→ Briton Ferry Llansawel (loan)	1	(0)
2025–2026	→ Llanelli Town (loan)	17	(2)
2026	→ Barry Town United (loan)	4	(0)
2026–	Bristol Manor Farm	0	(0)
- * Club domestic league appearances and goals as of 11:05, 16 August 2026 (UTC)

Jac Norris (born 9 November 2006) is a Welsh footballer who plays as a central midfielder for Southern Football League club Bristol Manor Farm.

== Career ==
Norris came through the youth set-up at Cwmbran Celtic before joining the academy at Newport County. During the 2022-23 season he played for the club's under 18 side as an under 16 player. He made his first team debut for Newport in EFL League Two against Grimsby Town on 6 April 2024. On 14 June 2024 Norris signed his first professional contract with Newport County.

On 3 January 2025, Norris joined Cymru Premier side Briton Ferry Llansawel on loan for the remainder of the 2024-25 season. In September 2025 Norris joined Cymru Premier side Llanelli Town on loan for the 2025-26 season. He was recalled by Newport in January 2026. On 2 February 2026 he joined Cymru Premier side Barry Town United for the remainder of the 2025-26 season

He was released by the club at the end of the 2025–26 season. In July 2026 Norris joined Bristol Manor Farm.

== Style of play ==
A midfield player, he was described as "brave on the ball" by the Newport manager Graham Coughlan in April 2024.
