= Josh Seberry =

Irish association football player

Personal information
- Full name: Joshua Seberry
- Date of birth: 9 January 2005 (age 21)
- Place of birth: London, England
- Height: 1.90 m (6 ft 3 in)
- Position: Defender

Youth career
- 2016–: Drogheda Boys
- –2022: Drogheda United
- 2022–2023: Shelbourne

Senior career*
Years	Team	Apps	(Gls)
2023–2025	Newport County	9	(0)
2025	→ Weston-super-Mare (loan)	11	(0)
- * Club domestic league appearances and goals as of 08:02, 19 May 2025 (UTC)

Joshua Seberry (born 9 January 2005) is an Irish professional footballer who plays as a defender.

== Early life ==
Born in London, England, Seberry was raised in Monasterboice, County Louth and was a National Champion swimmer and track and field athlete in his youth. As well as GAA football, swimming and athletics, he also holds a national fighting title and Black Belt in Taekwondo. Seberry started playing football aged 12 at Drogheda Boys at under-13 level.

== Career ==
Seberry played for Drogheda Boys academy and St Kevins Boys academy before moving to the LOI where he joined Drogheda United u15 before moving to Shelbourne's academy aged 18 in 2022 where after 5 months featured in 4 of the club's 2023 First Team pre-season friendlies under manager Damien Duff before his transfer to Newport County in Wales.

In July 2023, following a brief trial, Seberry signed a two-year contract with Newport County.

He made his first league match-day squad for Newport on the 5 August 2023, being named amongst the substitutes against Accrington Stanley. He made his Carabao Cup starting debut for Newport on 8 August 2023, in the 3–1 EFL Cup first round win against Charlton Athletic and as a right back holding premiership team Brentford to a 1–1 draw He made his Football League debut for Newport on 15 August 2023 as a second-half substitute in the 4–2 EFL League Two against Crewe Alexandra. and his first League start against Colchester. Seberry suffered a broken leg on 24 October 2023 while playing Notts County that would rule him out of action for four-to-five months with him requiring surgery.

In January 2025 Seberry joined Weston-super-Mare for the remainder of the 2024–25 season. He was released by Newport County at the end of the 2024–25 season.

== Style of play ==
Seberry is described as a "natural athlete" gifted with pace and is experienced playing at right back and as an attacking right sided centre back.

== Personal life ==
Seberry qualifies to play for the Republic of Ireland, England or South Africa.

== Career statistics ==
As of match played 1 March 2025

Appearances and goals by club, season and competition
Club	Season	League			FA Cup		EFL Cup		Other		Total	
Club	Season	Division	Apps	Goals	Apps	Goals	Apps	Goals	Apps	Goals	Apps	Goals
Newport County	2023-24	League Two	9	0	0	0	2	0	1 (Note: Appearance(s) in EFL Trophy)	0	12	0
Newport County	2024-25	League Two	0	0	0	0	0	0	0	0	0	0
Newport County	Total		9	0	0	0	2	0	1	0	12	0
Weston-super-Mare (loan)	2024-25	National League South	7	0	0	0	—		0	0	7	0
Career total			16	0	0	0	2	0	1	0	19	0
