= Nelson Sanca =

Portuguese footballer (born 2006)

Personal information
- Full name: Nelson Diogo Balde Sanca
- Date of birth: 10 October 2006 (age 20)
- Place of birth: Lisbon, Portugal
- Height: 1.85 m (6 ft 1 in)
- Position: Defender

Youth career
- –2023: Canton

Senior career*
Years	Team	Apps	(Gls)
2023–2026	Newport County	4	(0)
2025	→ Briton Ferry Llansawel (loan)	12	(0)
2025–2026	→ Llanelli Town (loan)	15	(0)
2026–	Chippenham Town	6	(0)
- * Club domestic league appearances and goals as of 11:49, 4 September 2026 (UTC)

Nelson Diogo Balde Sanca (born 10 October 2006) is a Portuguese footballer who last played as a central defender for Southern League Premier Division South club Chippenham Town.

== Career ==
A central defender, Sanca came through at Canton F.C. in Cardiff. He joined the academy at Newport County for the 2023-24 season.

He began to be included in first-team match day squads for the club in November 2023. After 16 unused substitute appearances, he made his club debut in a 2–1 defeat to Tranmere Rovers in EFL League Two on 13 April 2024. In April 2024 Sanca was selected as the Newport County Academy Player of the Year. In July 2024 Sanca signed his first professional contract with Newport County.

On 3 January 2025, Sanca joined Cymru Premier club Briton Ferry Llansawel on loan for the remainder of the 2024–25 season. On 29 August 2025 Sanca joined Cymru Premier club Llanelli Town on loan for the remainder of the 2025–26 season. He was recalled by Newport in January 2026. He was released by the club at the end of the 2025–26 season.

On 7 August 2026, Sanca joined Southern League Premier Division South club Chippenham Town, making his debut in a 2–0 away defeat to Uxbridge.
