= 2026–27 Bristol Rovers F.C. season =

144th season in existence of Bristol Rovers FC

Bristol Rovers
2026–27 season
- Owner: Hussain Al-Saeed
- Head Coach: Steve Evans
- Stadium: Memorial Stadium
- League Two: 17th
- FA Cup: Second round
- EFL Cup: First round
- EFL Trophy: Group stage
- Top goalscorer: League: Fabrizio Cavegn; Bobby Kamwa (both 3); All: Fabrizio Cavegn (4)
- Highest home attendance: 11,106 vs. Exeter City (26 September 2026)
- Lowest home attendance: 1,215 vs. Reading (10 November 2026, EFL Trophy group stage)
- Average home league attendance: 9,162

The 2026–27 season is the 144th season in the history of Bristol Rovers Football Club and their second consecutive season in League Two. In addition to the domestic league, the club would also participate in the FA Cup, the EFL Cup, and the EFL Trophy.

== Current squad ==
As of 4 September 2026

No.	Name	Position	Nationality	Date of birth (age)	Previous club	Date signed	Fee	Contract end
Goalkeepers
1	Brad Young	GK	(England)	5 May 2002 (age 24)	Leicester City	1 July 2025	Free	30 June 2030
32	Charlie Binns	GK	(England)	28 April 2005 (age 21)	Bath City	5 August 2026	Free	30 June 2027
Defenders
2	Tom James	RB	(Wales)	15 April 1996 (age 30)	Leyton Orient	1 July 2026	Free	30 June 2028
3	Jack Sparkes	LB	(England)	29 September 2000 (age 26)	Peterborough United	23 June 2025	Free	30 June 2027
4	Kofi Balmer	CB	(Northern Ireland)	19 September 2000 (age 26)	Motherwell	1 July 2026	Free	30 June 2028
5	Alfie Kilgour	CB	(England)	18 May 1998 (age 28)	Mansfield Town	1 July 2025	Free	30 June 2027
14	Ben Purrington	LB	(England)	20 May 1996 (age 30)	Cambridge United	1 July 2026	Free	30 June 2027
17	Ciarán Kelly	CB	(Republic of Ireland)	4 July 1998 (age 28)	Bradford City	1 July 2026	Free	30 July 2028
23	Macauley Southam-Hales	RB	(Wales)	2 February 1996 (age 30)	Stockport County	1 July 2025	Free	30 June 2027
26	Riley Harbottle	CB	(England)	26 September 2000 (age 26)	AFC Wimbledon	16 January 2026	Free	30 June 2028
Midfielders
6	Clinton Mola	LB	(England)	15 March 2001 (age 25)	Reading	1 July 2024	Free	30 June 2027
8	Reiss-Alexander Russell-Denny	CM	(England)	11 May 2006 (age 20)	Tottenham Hotspur	7 August 2026	Loan	31 May 2027
11	Jack Aitchison	AM	(Scotland)	5 March 2000 (age 26)	Exeter City	1 July 2026	Free	30 June 2028
21	Richard Smallwood	CM	(England)	29 December 1990 (age 35)	Tranmere Rovers	1 July 2026	Free	30 June 2027
22	Keenan Gough	DM	(England)	28 February 2006 (age 20)	Charlton Athletic	7 August 2026	Loan	31 May 2027
24	Tommy Leigh	CM	(England)	13 April 2000 (age 26)	Bradford City	17 June 2026	Loan	31 May 2027
33	Ryan de Havilland	CM	(England)	15 June 2001 (age 25)	Peterborough United	3 January 2026	Undisclosed	30 June 2028
Forwards
7	Shaq Forde	RW	(England)	5 May 2004 (age 22)	Watford	30 August 2024	Undisclosed	30 June 2027
9	Joe Quigley	CF	(Republic of Ireland)	10 December 1996 (age 29)	Oldham Athletic	2 February 2026	Undisclosed	30 June 2028
10	Bobby Kamwa	LW	(Cameroon)	18 March 2000 (age 26)	Newport County	1 July 2026	Free	30 June 2028
19	Ellis Harrison	CF	(Wales)	29 January 1994 (age 32)	Milton Keynes Dons	29 July 2025	Free	30 June 2027
27	Philip Sanyaolu	RW	(England)	3 November 2007 (age 19)	Queens Park Rangers	24 August 2026	Loan	31 May 2027
29	Fabrizio Cavegn	CF	(Switzerland)	28 August 2002 (age 24)	Vaduz	1 August 2025	Undisclosed	30 June 2028
Out on loan
18	Mees Rijks	CF	(Netherlands)	8 March 2003 (age 23)	Vålerenga	27 January 2026	Undisclosed	30 June 2028
20	Promise Omochere	RW	(Republic of Ireland)	18 October 2000 (age 26)	Fleetwood Town	19 July 2024	£500,000	30 June 2027
25	Ryan Howley	CM	(Wales)	23 November 2003 (age 22)	Coventry City	8 July 2025	Free	30 June 2027
30	Ollie Dewsbury	CF	(Wales)	22 February 2008 (age 18)	Academy	1 July 2023	Trainee	30 June 2027

== Transfers and contracts ==
=== In ===
Date	Pos.	Player	From	Fee	Ref.
1 July 2026 (Note: The transfer was announced on 29 June, and would become official on July 1 once Aitchison's contract at Exeter City expired.)	CAM	(Scotland) Jack Aitchison	(England) Exeter City	Free	
1 July 2026 (Note: The transfer was announced on 8 June, and would become official on July 1 once Balmer's contract at Motherwell expired.)	CB	(Northern Ireland) Kofi Balmer	(Scotland) Motherwell	Free	
1 July 2026 (Note: The transfer was announced on 19 June, and would become official on July 1 once James' contract at Leyton Orient expired.)	RB	(Wales) Tom James	(England) Leyton Orient	Free	
1 July 2026 (Note: The transfer was announced on 26 June, and would become official on July 1 once Kamwa's contract at Newport County expired.)	LW	(Cameroon) Bobby Kamwa	(Wales) Newport County	Free	
1 July 2026 (Note: The transfer was announced on 22 June, and would become official on July 1 once Kelly's contract at Bradford City expired.)	CB	(Republic of Ireland) Ciarán Kelly	(England) Bradford City	Free	
1 July 2026 (Note: The transfer was announced on 11 June, and would become official on July 1 once Purrington's contract at Cambridge United expired.)	LB	(England) Ben Purrington	(England) Cambridge United	Free	
1 July 2026 (Note: The transfer was announced on 5 June, and would become official on July 1 once Smallwood's contract at Tranmere Rovers expired.)	CDM	(England) Richard Smallwood	(England) Tranmere Rovers	Free	
5 August 2026	GK	(England) Charlie Binns	(England) Bath City	Free	
6 October 2026	LW	(England) Arvin Appiah	(Spain) Almería	Free	

=== Loaned in ===
Date	Pos.	Player	From	Loaned until	Ref.
17 June 2026	CAM	(England) Tommy Leigh	(England) Bradford City	End of Season	
7 August 2026	CDM	(England) Keenan Gough	(England) Charlton Athletic	End of Season	
7 August 2026	CM	(England) Reiss-Alexander Russell-Denny	(England) Tottenham Hotspur	End of Season	
24 August 2026	RW	(England) Philip Sanyaolu	(England) Queens Park Rangers	End of Season	

=== Loaned out ===
Date	Pos.	Player	To	Loaned until	Ref.
5 August 2026	GK	(England) Charlie Binns	(England) Malvern Town	13 August 2026 (Note: On 13 August, Binns was recalled from his season-long loan.)	
15 August 2026	CB	(England) Henry De-Long	(England) Bristol Manor Farm	12 September 2026	
18 August 2026	CAM	(England) Jay Horgan	(England) Didcot Town	15 September 2026	
2 September 2026	CF	(Republic of Ireland) Promise Omochere	(England) Southend United	End of Season	
4 September 2026	CM	(England) Ryan Howley	(England) Tamworth	4 December 2026	
18 September 2026	CDM	(England) Kian Hill	(England) Gloucester City	17 October 2026	
18 September 2026	CF	(Netherlands) Mees Rijks	(England) Forest Green Rovers	12 December 2026	
9 October 2026	CF	(Wales) Ollie Dewsbury	(England) Farnborough	9 November 2026	

=== Out ===
Date	Pos.	Player	To	Fee	Ref.
9 July 2026	CM	(Sierra Leone) Kamil Conteh	(England) Bromley	Undisclosed	
10 July 2026	GK	(England) Jed Ward	(England) Walsall	Undisclosed	
20 July 2026	CAM	(England) Isaac Hutchinson	(England) Doncaster Rovers	Undisclosed	
11 August 2026	GK	(Northern Ireland) Luke Southwood	(England) Blackpool	Undisclosed	

=== Released / out of contract ===
Date	Pos.	Player	Subsequent club	Joined date	Ref.
19 June 2026	RB	(England) Joel Senior	(England) Tranmere Rovers	1 July 2026	
30 June 2026	CB	(Wales) Tom Lockyer	(Australia) Melbourne Victory	11 July 2026	
30 June 2026	RW	(England) Luke Thomas	(Scotland) St Mirren	1 August 2026	
5 August 2026	CM	(England) Josh McEachran			
21 August 2026	CB	(England) Taylor Moore	(Slovakia) FC Košice	5 September 2026	

=== New contract ===
Date	Pos.	Player	Contract until	Ref.
29 May 2026	CF	(Wales) Ellis Harrison	30 June 2027	
1 June 2026	GK	(England) Brad Young	30 June 2030	
22 July 2026	CDM	(England) Kian Hill	Undisclosed (Note: First professional contract)	

== Pre-season and friendlies ==
On 20 May, Rovers announced four pre-season friendlies, against Salisbury, Yeovil Town, Forest Green Rovers and Yate Town. On 3 June, the club confirmed a training camp at St Andrews between 29 July – 3 August. A home friendly against Leicester City was added. On 22 June, a further two friendlies were added against Weston-super-Mare and Portsmouth. On 27 July, two behind-closed-doors matches against Dundee and Burnley U21.

Win Draw Loss Fixtures

7 July 2026 Friendly	Weston-super-Mare	0–3	Bristol Rovers	Weston-super-Mare
19:15 BST		Report	Kamwa 19'; Rijks 45+2'; Omochere 73'	Stadium: The Optima Stadium; Attendance: 1,189; Referee: Ross Martin

11 July 2026 Friendly	Salisbury	2–3	Bristol Rovers	Old Sarum
14:00 BST	Odokonyero 23', 45'	Report	Cavegn 16'; Purrington 34'; Rijks 50'	Stadium: Raymond McEnhill Stadium

14 July 2026 Friendly	Bristol Rovers	1–2	Leicester City	Bristol
19:00 BST	Harrison 40'	Report	Otchere 4'; Opoku 64'	Stadium: Memorial Stadium; Attendance: 2,004 (480 away); Referee: Sam Allison

18 July 2026 Friendly	Yeovil Town	Cancelled	Bristol Rovers	Yeovil
14:00 BST				Stadium: Huish Park
Note: On 18 June, the club announced the fixture at Yeovil Town would no longer go ahead.

18 July 2026 Friendly	Bristol Rovers	1–1	Portsmouth	Bristol
15:00 BST	Cavegn 57'	Report	Downey 77'	Stadium: Memorial Stadium; Attendance: 2,064 (574 away); Referee: Sunny Singh Gill

21 July 2026 Friendly	Forest Green Rovers	2–2	Bristol Rovers	Nailsworth
19:00 BST	Mellor 10'; Berry 16'	Report	Leigh 74', 90+1'	Stadium: The Bolt New Lawn; Attendance: 1,144 (382 away)

24 July 2026 Friendly	Yate Town	Cancelled	Bristol Rovers	Yate
19:00 BST				Stadium: Lodge Road
Note: Fixture was cancelled by mutual agreement.

29 July 2026 Friendly	Dundee	0–3	Bristol Rovers	St Andrews, Scotland
19:00 BST		Report	Aitchison; Forde; Harbottle	Stadium: University of St Andrews; Attendance: 0 (BCD); Referee: Nathan Crawford

31 July 2026 Friendly	Burnley U21	1–1	Bristol Rovers	St Andrews, Scotland
13:00 BST		Report	Harbottle	Stadium: University of St Andrews; Attendance: 0 (BCD)

== Competitions ==
=== League Two ===
==== League table ====
Pos	Team	Pld	W	D	L	GF	GA	GD	Pts
14	Accrington Stanley	16	4	8	4	26	22	+4	20
15	Fleetwood Town	16	5	5	6	20	20	0	20
16	Bristol Rovers	16	6	1	9	20	25	−5	19
17	Swindon Town	16	5	4	7	16	23	−7	19
18	Northampton Town	15	4	6	5	13	13	0	18

Updated to match(es) played on 21 November 2026. Source: EFL Official Website
Rules for classification: 1) Points; 2) Goal difference; 3) Number of goals scored; 4) Head-to-head results; 5) Wins; 6) Away goals; 7) Penalty points (sec 9.5); 8) 12-point sending off offences

==== Results summary ====
Overall								Home						Away					
Pld	W	D	L	GF	GA	GD	Pts	W	D	L	GF	GA	GD	W	D	L	GF	GA	GD
16	6	1	9	20	25	−5	19	4	1	3	11	10	+1	2	0	6	9	15	−6

Last updated: 21 November 2026.
Source: Soccerway

==== Results by round ====
Round	1	2	3	4	5	6	7	8	9	10	11	12	13	14	15	16	17	18	19	20	21	22	23	24	25
Ground	A	H	A	H	H	A	A	H	A	H	A	H	H	A	H	A	H	A	H	A	H	A	A	H	H
Result	L	W	W	W	W	L	L	W	L	L	L	L	D	L	L	W									
Position	16	6	7	1	1	2	6	3	5	9	9	16	15	17	18	16									
Points	0	3	6	9	12	12	12	15	15	15	15	15	16	16	16	19									

Source: Soccerway
A = Away; H = Home; W = Win; D = Draw; L = Loss; P = Postponed

==== Matches ====
On 25 June, the League Two fixtures were revealed.

Win Draw Loss Fixtures

15 August 2026 1	York City	3–2	Bristol Rovers	Huntington
15:00 BST	Newby 60'; Boyes 63', 80'; Banks (yellow card) 70'; Williams (yellow card) 78'	Report	Mola 30'; Leigh 78' (pen.)	Stadium: LNER Community Stadium; Attendance: 8,156; Referee: Tom Nield

22 August 2026 2	Bristol Rovers	5–3	Newport County	Bristol
12:30 BST	Mola (yellow card) 8'; Purrington 45+1'; Cavegn 53', 90+9'; Jenkins 57' (o.g.); Kamwa 74' (yellow card) 75'	Report	Biggins 1'; Gwengwe 61'; Brennan (yellow card) 76'; Jarvis 90+1'	Stadium: Memorial Stadium; Attendance: 10,349; Referee: Simon Mather
Note: Fixture was initially scheduled for a 15:00 kick-off, but was brought forward.

29 August 2026 3	Crawley Town	0–2	Bristol Rovers	Crawley
15:00 BST	Watson (yellow card) 31'; Krasniqi (yellow card) 48'; Morgan (yellow card) 89'	Report	James 23', (yellow card) 68'; Leigh (yellow card) 29'; Kamwa 41'; Balmer (yellow card) 43'; Harbottle (yellow card) 81'	Stadium: Broadfield Stadium; Attendance: 4,120 (851 away); Referee: Leigh Doughty

1 September 2026 4	Bristol Rovers	2–0	Colchester United	Bristol
19:45 BST	James (yellow card) 22', (goal) 27'; Leigh (yellow card) 45+1'; Smallwood (yellow card) 79'; Harrison 90+3'	Report	Tucker (yellow card) 35'	Stadium: Memorial Stadium; Attendance: 7,663; Referee: Alex Chilowicz

5 September 2026 5	Bristol Rovers	1–0	Rotherham United	Bristol
15:00 BST	Leigh 32'; Mola (yellow card) 73'	Report	Fitzgerald (yellow card) 57'; Austerfield (yellow card) 74'; Ngwenya (yellow card) 90+5'	Stadium: Memorial Stadium; Attendance: 9,226; Referee: Darren Drysdale

12 September 2026 6	Grimsby Town	2–0	Bristol Rovers	Cleethorpes
12:30 BST	Green 22', (yellow card) 64'; Turi 40'; Vernam (yellow card) 71'	Report	Purrington (yellow card) 10'; Forde (yellow card) 38'; Balmer (yellow card) 64'; Leigh (red card) 75'	Stadium: Blundell Park; Attendance: 6,945 (376 away); Referee: Edward Duckworth
Note: Fixture was initially scheduled for a 15:00 kick-off, but was brought forward for live Sky Sports.

19 September 2026 7	Gillingham	3–0	Bristol Rovers	Gillingham
15:00 BST	Brophy 55'; Kendall 85', 89'	Report	Harrison (yellow card) 65'; Balmer (yellow card) 68'	Stadium: Priestfield Stadium; Attendance: 5,947 (634 away); Referee: Sunny Singh Gill

26 September 2026 8	Bristol Rovers	1–0	Exeter City	Bristol
15:00 BST	Harrison (yellow card) 60'; Cavegn 66'	Report	Edwards (yellow card) 39'	Stadium: Memorial Stadium; Attendance: 11,106 (1,336 away); Referee: Martin Coy

3 October 2026 9	Crewe Alexandra	3–1	Bristol Rovers	Crewe
15:00 BST	Lankester 1', 21'; March (yellow card) 8'; Stephenson (yellow card) 10'; Lunt (yellow card) 38'; Gibson 66'; Thomas (yellow card) 79'	Report	James (yellow card) 8'; Kelly (yellow card) 30'; Gough (yellow card) 77'; Mola (yellow card) 89'; Kamwa 90+2'	Stadium: Mornflake Stadium; Attendance: 5,964 (995 away); Referee: Matthew Russell

10 October 2026 10	Bristol Rovers	1–3	Barnet	Bristol
15:00 BST	Harrison 4'; Forde (yellow card) 29'; Purrington (yellow card) 65'; Leigh (red card) 85'		Kanu (yellow card) 31'; Senior 79'; Williams 86'; Collinge (yellow card) 90+5'; Tshimanga 90+5'	Stadium: Memorial Stadium; Attendance: 8,996; Referee: Tim Robinson

17 October 2026 11	Shrewsbury Town	1–0	Bristol Rovers	Shrewsbury
12:30 BST	Ruffels (yellow card) 16'; Lloyd (yellow card) 43', (goal) 77' (pen.); Turner-Cooke (red card) 80'; Fletcher (red card) 90+4'	Report	Forde (yellow card) 10'; Gough (yellow card) 64'; Purrington (yellow card) 88'	Stadium: Croud Meadow; Attendance: 5,329 (891 away); Referee: Ben Toner
Note: Fixture was initially scheduled for a 15:00 kick-off, but was brought forward for live Sky Sports broadcasting.

20 October 2026 12	Bristol Rovers	1–2	Salford City	Bristol
19:45 BST	Balmer (yellow card) 37'; Kelly (yellow card) 38'; Forde (yellow card) 41'; Harrison (penalty missed) 54'; Sparkes 57'; Gough (yellow card) 90+3'	Report	Wiredu 6'; Udoh 20'; Bonds (yellow card) 29'; Graydon (yellow card) 45+1'; Garbutt (yellow card) 48'	Stadium: Memorial Stadium; Attendance: 6,895; Referee: Dean Whitestone

24 October 2026 13	Bristol Rovers	0–0	Swindon Town	Bristol
15:00 BST	Balmer (yellow card) 37'	Report	Majekodunmi (yellow card) 76'; Butler (yellow card) 90+3'	Stadium: Memorial Stadium; Attendance: 9,897; Referee: Seb Stockbridge

31 October 2026 14	Fleetwood Town	3–1	Bristol Rovers	Fleetwood
15:00 GMT	Bennett (yellow card) 10', (goal) 59'; Loupalo-Bi 37'; McCann (yellow card) 82'; Robertson 90'	Report	Russell-Denny 84'	Stadium: Highbury Stadium; Attendance: 2,822 (399 away); Referee: Richard Eley

14 November 2026 15	Bristol Rovers	0–2	Chesterfield	Bristol
15:00 GMT		Report	McFadzean (yellow card) 6'; Marsh 24'; Bonis (yellow card) 42', (goal) 77'	Stadium: Memorial Stadium; Attendance: 8,661 (673 away); Referee: Neil Hair

21 November 2026 16	Cheltenham Town	3–0	Bristol Rovers	Cheltenham
15:00 GMT	Shipley (yellow card) 12'; McCann (penalty missed) 51'; Cundy (yellow card) 55'; McWilliams (red card) 64'	Report	Forde 3'; Kilgour (yellow card) 14'; Leigh (yellow card) 35'; Harrison 43'; James 47'; Balmer (yellow card) 81'	Stadium: EV Charger Points Stadium; Attendance: 5,235 (1,054 away); Referee: Gavin Ward

28 November 2026 17	Bristol Rovers	v	Tranmere Rovers	Bristol
12:30 GMT				Stadium: Memorial Stadium
Note: Fixture was initially scheduled for a 15:00 kick-off, but was brought forward for live Sky Sports broadcasting.

1 December 2026 18	Oldham Athletic	v	Bristol Rovers	Oldham
19:45 GMT				Stadium: Boundary Park

12 December 2026 19	Bristol Rovers	v	Accrington Stanley	Bristol
15:00 GMT				Stadium: Memorial Stadium

19 December 2026 20	Rochdale	v	Bristol Rovers	Spotland
15:00 GMT				Stadium: Crown Oil Arena

26 December 2026 21	Bristol Rovers	v	Walsall	Bristol
15:00 GMT				Stadium: Memorial Stadium

29 December 2026 22	Port Vale	v	Bristol Rovers	Burslem
19:45 GMT				Stadium: Vale Park

2 January 2027 23	Northampton Town	v	Bristol Rovers	Sixfields
15:00 GMT				Stadium: Sixfields Stadium
Note: Fixture was initially scheduled for 1 January, but was pushed back by 24 hours after both teams agreed to reschedule to allow extra player recovery time over the festive period.

9 January 2027 24	Bristol Rovers	v	Rochdale	Bristol
15:00 GMT				Stadium: Memorial Stadium

16 January 2027 25	Bristol Rovers	v	Shrewsbury Town	Bristol
12:30 GMT				Stadium: Memorial Stadium
Note: Fixture was initially scheduled for a 15:00 kick-off, but was brought forward for live Sky Sports broadcasting.

=== FA Cup ===
Bristol Rovers were drawn at home to Cambridge United in the first round and away to Rotherham United in the second round.

Win Draw Loss Fixtures

6 November 2026 First round	Bristol Rovers	2–0	Cambridge United	Horfield
19:30 GMT	Kilgour (yellow card) 39'; Russell-Denny 57'; Leigh (yellow card) 71'; Cavegn 72'; Purrington (yellow card) 74'; Mola (yellow card) 79'	Report	Bennett (yellow card) 51'; Kaikai (penalty missed) 82'	Stadium: Memorial Stadium; Attendance: 3,657 (260 away); Referee: Jamie O'Connor

5 December 2026 Second round	Rotherham United	v	Bristol Rovers	Rotherham
15:00 GMT				Stadium: AESSEAL New York Stadium

=== EFL Cup ===
The draw for the first round was conducted on 25 June.

Win Draw Loss Fixtures

8 August 2026 First round	Bristol Rovers	0–1	Peterborough United	Bristol
15:00 BST	Forde (yellow card) 22'	Report	Dornelly (yellow card) 13'; Leonard 19' (pen.) (yellow card) 31'; Jones (yellow card) 29'	Stadium: Memorial Stadium; Attendance: 4,810; Referee: David Rock

=== EFL Trophy ===
==== Group stage ====
Rovers were drawn against Reading, Wycombe Wanderers and a Chelsea U21 into Southern Group C.

Pos	Div	Team	Pld	W	PW	PL	L	GF	GA	GD	Pts	Qualification
1	L1	Wycombe Wanderers	3	2	0	1	0	7	3	+4	7	Advance to Round 2
2	ACA	Chelsea U21	3	1	1	0	1	5	4	+1	5	Advance to Round 2
3	L1	Reading	3	0	1	1	1	3	5	−2	3	
4	L2	Bristol Rovers	3	0	1	1	1	5	8	−3	3	

Source: EFL

Win Draw Loss Fixtures

25 August 2026 Group stage	Bristol Rovers	2–2 (2–4 p)	Chelsea U21	Bristol
19:00 BST	Rijks 22'; Quigley 58', (yellow card) 63'		Ezenwata (yellow card) 35', (goal) 82'; Bettoni 71'; Osagie (yellow card) 89'	Stadium: Memorial Stadium; Attendance: 2,405; Referee: Ross Martin
	Penalties
	Harrison (penalty scored); Sparkes (penalty missed); Russell-Denny (penalty scored); Smallwood (penalty missed)		(penalty scored) Ezenwata; (penalty missed) Waite; (penalty scored) Bettoni; (penalty scored) Richards; (penalty scored) Osagie

6 October 2026 Group stage	Wycombe Wanderers	4–1	Bristol Rovers	High Wycombe
19:00 BST	Mothersille 4'; Tezgel 22', 87'; Woodrow 33'; Leahy (yellow card) 68'	Report	Leigh (yellow card) 45+3'; Harrison 73'; Sparkes (yellow card) 79'	Stadium: Adams Park; Referee: Harrison Blair

10 November 2026 Group stage	Bristol Rovers	2–2 (5–3 p)	Reading	Bristol
19:00 GMT	Appiah 58'; Sanyaolu 65'; Southam-Hales (yellow card) 75'; Leigh (yellow card) 90+5'	Report	Patton 3'; Beacroft (yellow card) 40'; Jones 55'	Stadium: Memorial Stadium; Attendance: 1,215 (inc. 352 away); Referee: Oliver Mackey
	Penalties
	Leigh (penalty scored); Sparkes (penalty scored); De Havilland (penalty scored); Russell-Denny (penalty scored); Salahi-Ali (penalty scored)		Patton (penalty scored); Beacroft (penalty scored); Sackey (penalty scored); Dashi (penalty missed)

== Statistics ==
=== Appearances and goals ===
As of match played 21 November 2026

Players with no appearances are not included on the list; italics indicate loaned in player

No.	Pos	Nat	Player	Total		League Two		FA Cup		EFL Cup		EFL Trophy	
No.	Pos	Nat	Player	Apps	Goals	Apps	Goals	Apps	Goals	Apps	Goals	Apps	Goals
1	GK	(England) ENG	Brad Young	18	0	16+0	0	1+0	0	1+0	0	0+0	0
2	DF	(Wales) WAL	Tom James	16	3	15+0	3	1+0	0	0+0	0	0+0	0
3	DF	(England) ENG	Jack Sparkes	11	1	6+2	1	0+0	0	0+0	0	3+0	0
4	DF	(Northern Ireland) NIR	Kofi Balmer	17	0	15+0	0	1+0	0	1+0	0	0+0	0
5	DF	(England) ENG	Alfie Kilgour	9	0	7+0	0	1+0	0	0+0	0	1+0	0
6	MF	(England) ENG	Clinton Mola	18	1	16+0	1	1+0	0	1+0	0	0+0	0
7	FW	(England) ENG	Shaq Forde	20	1	14+2	1	0+1	0	1+0	0	0+2	0
8	MF	(England) ENG	Reiss-Alexander Russell-Denny	18	2	2+11	1	1+0	1	0+1	0	1+2	0
9	FW	(Republic of Ireland) IRL	Joe Quigley	16	1	3+9	0	1+0	0	1+0	0	2+0	1
10	MF	(Cameroon) CMR	Bobby Kamwa	17	3	9+5	3	0+1	0	0+1	0	1+0	0
11	FW	(Scotland) SCO	Jack Aitchison	8	0	1+5	0	0+0	0	1+0	0	1+0	0
14	DF	(England) ENG	Ben Purrington	14	1	9+2	1	1+0	0	1+0	0	1+0	0
17	DF	(Republic of Ireland) IRL	Ciarán Kelly	12	0	8+2	0	0+0	0	0+0	0	2+0	0
18	FW	(Netherlands) NED	Mees Rijks	2	1	0+0	0	0+0	0	0+1	0	1+0	1
19	FW	(Wales) WAL	Ellis Harrison	14	4	6+6	3	0+0	0	0+0	0	0+2	1
21	MF	(England) ENG	Richard Smallwood	17	0	12+1	0	0+0	0	1+0	0	2+1	0
22	MF	(England) ENG	Keenan Gough	12	0	7+2	0	1+0	0	0+1	0	1+0	0
23	DF	(Wales) WAL	Macauley Southam-Hales	5	0	1+0	0	0+0	0	1+0	0	3+0	0
24	MF	(England) ENG	Tommy Leigh	13	2	8+1	2	1+0	0	1+0	0	1+1	0
25	MF	(Wales) WAL	Ryan Howley	1	0	0+0	0	0+0	0	0+0	0	1+0	0
26	DF	(England) ENG	Riley Harbottle	7	0	6+0	0	0+0	0	1+0	0	0+0	0
27	FW	(England) ENG	Philip Sanyaolu	9	1	0+5	0	0+1	0	0+0	0	2+1	1
28	DF	(England) ENG	Arvin Appiah	7	1	2+3	0	0+0	0	0+0	0	2+0	1
29	FW	(Switzerland) SUI	Fabrizio Cavegn	16	4	13+1	3	1+0	1	0+1	0	0+0	0
30	FW	(Wales) WAL	Ollie Dewsbury	1	0	0+0	0	0+0	0	0+0	0	0+1	0
32	GK	(England) ENG	Charlie Binns	3	0	0+0	0	0+0	0	0+0	0	3+0	0
33	MF	(England) ENG	Ryan De Havilland	3	0	0+0	0	0+0	0	0+0	0	3+0	0
34	MF	(England) ENG	Stan Dunne	2	0	0+0	0	0+0	0	0+0	0	1+1	0
42	MF	(England) ENG	Jack Toogood	1	0	0+0	0	0+0	0	0+0	0	0+1	0
43	MF	(England) ENG	Kazim Salahi-Ali	1	0	0+0	0	0+0	0	0+0	0	0+1	0
49	DF	(England) ENG	Excel Iwhiwhu	1	0	0+0	0	0+0	0	0+0	0	1+0	0

=== Disciplinary record ===
As of match played 21 November 2026

Rank	No.	Nat.	Po.	Name	League Two			FA Cup			EFL Cup			EFL Trophy			Total		
Rank	No.	Nat.	Po.	Name	Yellow card	(yellow card) (yellow-red card)	Red card	Yellow card	(yellow card) (yellow-red card)	Red card	Yellow card	(yellow card) (yellow-red card)	Red card	Yellow card	(yellow card) (yellow-red card)	Red card	Yellow card	(yellow card) (yellow-red card)	Red card
1	24	(England)	CAM	Tommy Leigh	3	0	2	1	0	0	0	0	0	2	0	0	6	0	2
2	4	(Northern Ireland)	CB	Kofi Balmer	6	0	0	0	0	0	0	0	0	0	0	0	6	0	0
3	7	(England)	RW	Shaq Forde	4	0	0	0	0	0	1	0	0	0	0	0	5	0	0
4	6	(England)	CDM	Clinton Mola	3	0	0	1	0	0	0	0	0	0	0	0	4	0	0
4	14	(England)	LB	Ben Purrington	3	0	0	1	0	0	0	0	0	0	0	0	4	0	0
6	2	(Wales)	RB	Tom James	3	0	0	0	0	0	0	0	0	0	0	0	3	0	0
6	22	(England)	CB	Keenan Gough	3	0	0	0	0	0	0	0	0	0	0	0	3	0	0
8	5	(England)	CB	Alfie Kilgour	1	0	0	1	0	0	0	0	0	0	0	0	2	0	0
8	17	(Republic of Ireland)	CB	Ciarán Kelly	2	0	0	0	0	0	0	0	0	0	0	0	2	0	0
8	19	(Wales)	CF	Ellis Harrison	2	0	0	0	0	0	0	0	0	0	0	0	2	0	0
11	3	(England)	LB	Jack Sparkes	0	0	0	0	0	0	0	0	0	1	0	0	1	0	0
11	9	(Republic of Ireland)	CF	Joe Quigley	0	0	0	0	0	0	0	0	0	1	0	0	1	0	0
11	10	(Cameroon)	LW	Bobby Kamwa	1	0	0	0	0	0	0	0	0	0	0	0	1	0	0
11	21	(England)	CDM	Richard Smallwood	1	0	0	0	0	0	0	0	0	0	0	0	1	0	0
11	23	(Wales)	RB	Macauley Southam-Hales	0	0	0	0	0	0	0	0	0	1	0	0	1	0	0
11	26	(England)	CB	Riley Harbottle	1	0	0	0	0	0	0	0	0	0	0	0	1	0	0
Total					33	0	2	4	0	0	1	0	0	5	0	0	43	0	2

== Awards ==
=== Player Awards ===
==== EFL League Two Goal of the Month ====
Month	Player	Opposition	Result	Ref.
August	(Wales) Tom James	v. Crawley Town	Nominated	
October	(Cameroon) Bobby Kamwa	v. Crewe Alexandra	Won	
