= 2026–27 Newport County A.F.C. season =

Welsh association football club season

Newport County
2026–27 season
- Owner: Huw Jenkins (52%), Newport County AFC Supporters Trust 27%, Other investors 21%
- Manager: Hayden Mullins (from 31 July 2026)
- Stadium: Rodney Parade
- League Two: 9th
- FA Cup: 2nd Round
- EFL Cup: First Round
- EFL Trophy: Group Stage
- Top goalscorer: League: Shaquille Gwengwe (5); All: Shaquille Gwengwe (5)
- Highest home attendance: 5,330 v Swindon Town (21 November 2026), EFL League 2
- Lowest home attendance: 975 v Crystal Palace U21 (3 November 2026), EFL Trophy Southern Group E
- Average home league attendance: 4,767
Home colours	Away colours	Third colours

The 2026–27 season is the 115th season in the history of Newport County Association Football Club and their fourteenth consecutive season in EFL League Two. In addition to the league, the club is participating in the FA Cup, the EFL Cup, and the EFL Trophy.

== Managerial changes ==
Prior to the season starting, Christian Fuchs resigned as manager on 27 June 2026. Assistant coach Chris Todd was appointed interim Manager of Newport County. On 31 July 2026 Hayden Mullins was appointed Newport County manager.

== Transfers and contracts ==
=== In ===
Date	Position	Player	From	Fee	Ref
23 June 2026	CF	(France) Yahya Bamba	(England) Forest Green Rovers	Undisclosed	
1 July 2026 (Note: The transfer was announced on 15 June, and would become official on July 1 once Biggins' contract at Shrewsbury Town expired.)	CM	(England) Harrison Biggins	(England) Shrewsbury Town	Free	
1 July 2026 (Note: The transfer was announced on 29 June, and would become official on July 1 once Cameron's contract at Bromley expired.)	CB	(Scotland) Kyle Cameron	(England) Bromley	Free	
1 July 2026 (Note: The transfer was announced on 24 June, and would become official on July 1 once Doidge's contract at Forest Green Rovers expired.)	CF	(Wales) Christian Doidge	(England) Forest Green Rovers	Free	
1 July 2026	CAM	(Wales) Kieron Evans	(England) Eastleigh	Undisclosed	
1 July 2026 (Note: The transfer was announced on 18 June, and would become official on July 1 once Gwengwe's contract at Poole Town expired.)	CF	(Malawi) Shaquille Gwengwe	(England) Poole Town	Free	
1 July 2026 (Note: The transfer was announced on 24 June, and would become official on July 1 once Norman's contract at Tranmere Rovers expired.)	RB	(England) Cameron Norman	(England) Tranmere Rovers	Free	
1 July 2026 (Note: The transfer was announced on 26 June, and would become official on July 1 once Sassi's contract at Blackpool expired.)	CB	(England) Dan Sassi	(England) Blackpool	Free	
21 August 2026	GK	(England) Jake Turner	(England) Gillingham	Free	
25 September 2026	CM	(Wales) Aaron Lewis	(England) Mansfield Town	Free	

=== Loaned in ===
Date	Position	Player	From	Loaned until	Ref
7 August 2026	LB	(England) Alfie Merritt	(England) Bournemouth	End of Season	
26 August 2026	CM	(New Zealand) Matt Dibley-Dias	(England) Fulham	2 January 2027	
1 September 2026	RW	(England) Michael Adu-Poku	(England) Watford	End of Season	
1 September 2026	LW	(Wales) Tanatswa Nyakuhwa	(Wales) Cardiff City	End of Season	
2 September 2026	CF	(England) Kion Etete	(Wales) Cardiff City	End of Season	
2 September 2026	LB	(England) Matty Jacob	(England) Hull City	2 January 2027	

=== Loaned out ===
Date	Position	Player	To	Date until	Ref
9 October 2026	CM	(England) Cole Jarvis	(Wales) Merthyr Town	1 January 2027	

=== Out ===
Date	Position	Player	To	Fee	Ref
23 July 2026	FW	(Scotland) Lewis Jamieson	(Scotland) Ross County	Undisclosed	

=== New contract ===
Date	Position	Player	Contract expiry	Ref
11 May 2026	RW	(England) Moses Alexander-Walker	30 June 2027	
11 May 2026	LB	(Wales) Tom Davies	30 June 2027	
11 May 2026	RB	(Wales) Joe Thomas	30 June 2027	
16 June 2026	CB	(Republic of Ireland) Ciaran Brennan	Undisclosed	
16 June 2026	RB	(Wales) Cameron Evans	Undisclosed	
30 June 2026	CM	(Wales) Keenan Patten	31 December 2026	
30 June 2026	CM	(Wales) Harri Pugh	Undisclosed	

== Pre-season and friendlies ==
On 12 June, County announced four pre-season friendlies against Bristol Manor Farm, Newport City, Gloucester City and Reading. On 5 July, a prestigious pre-season friendly against Roma was confirmed. Four days later, a visit to Yeovil Town was added to the schedule. On 15 July, a trip to visit Bath City was confirmed. A day later, a behind-closed-doors meeting with Bristol City was announced.

Win Draw Loss Fixtures

4 July 2026 Friendly	Bristol Manor Farm	0–3	Newport County	Bristol
13:00 BST (UTC+1)		Report	Jamieson 56', 60'; Smith 74'	Stadium: The Creek

8 July 2026 Friendly	Newport City	0–5	Newport County	Newport
19:30 BST (UTC+1)		Report	Bamba 4'; Jarvis 45+2'; Gwengwe 68', 75', 80'	Stadium: Newport Stadium; Attendance: 1,100

11 July 2026 Friendly	Gloucester City	2–1	Newport County	Gloucester
15:00 BST (UTC+1)	Hemmings 55'; Cross 63'	Report	Jenkins 23'	Stadium: Meadow Park; Attendance: 833

21 July 2026 Friendly	Bristol City	0–0	Newport County	Failand
12:00 BST (UTC+1)		Report		Stadium: Robins High Performance Centre; Attendance: 0 (BCD)

25 July 2026 Friendly	Bath City	2–2	Newport County	Bath
15:00 BST (UTC+1)	Greenslade; Fisher	Report	Garner; Halpin	Stadium: Twerton Park; Attendance: 618; Referee: Said Ouchene

28 July 2026 Friendly	Newport County	0–4	Reading	Newport
19:30 BST (UTC+1)		Report	Brown 11'; Stokes 50'; Jones 68', 89'	Stadium: Rodney Parade; Referee: Ross Martin

1 August 2026 Friendly	Yeovil Town	1–2	Newport County	Yeovil
15:00 BST (UTC+1)	McCormick 4'	Report	Gwengwe 31'; Smith 50'	Stadium: Huish Park; Attendance: 918

4 August 2026 Friendly	Newport County	1–4	Roma	Newport
19:00 BST (UTC+1)	Cameron 85'	Report	Hermoso 37'; Castro 54' (pen.); Koulierakis 59'; Soulé 81'	Stadium: Rodney Parade; Attendance: 7,500

== Competitions ==
=== League Two ===
==== League table ====
Pos	Team	Pld	W	D	L	GF	GA	GD	Pts	Promotion, qualification or relegation
7	Walsall	14	5	8	1	21	12	+9	23	Qualification for League Two play-offs
8	Exeter City	16	6	5	5	13	10	+3	23	
9	Newport County	16	5	7	4	24	19	+5	22	
10	Tranmere Rovers	16	5	7	4	21	19	+2	22	
11	Gillingham	16	5	6	5	23	24	−1	21	

Updated to match(es) played on 21 November 2026. Source: EFL Official Website
Rules for classification: 1) Points; 2) Goal difference; 3) Number of goals scored; 4) Head-to-head results; 5) Wins; 6) Away goals; 7) Penalty points (sec 9.5); 8) 12-point sending off offences

==== Results summary ====
Overall								Home						Away					
Pld	W	D	L	GF	GA	GD	Pts	W	D	L	GF	GA	GD	W	D	L	GF	GA	GD
16	5	7	4	24	19	+5	22	5	3	0	16	6	+10	0	4	4	8	13	−5

Last updated: 21 November 2026.
Source: Soccerway

==== Results by round ====
Round	1	2	3	4	5	6	7	8	9	10	11	12	13	14	15	16	17	18	19	20	21	22	23	24	25	26	27	28	29
Ground	H	A	H	A	A	H	A	H	A	H	H	A	A	H	A	H	A	H	A	H	A	H	H	A	A	H	H	A	H
Result	W	L	D	L	L	D	D	W	D	W	D	D	L	W	D	W													
Position	2	11	11	14	20	19	19	17	15	12	11	12	16	14	14	9													

Updated to match(es) played on pre-season. Source: Soccerway
A = Away; H = Home; W = Win; D = Draw; L = Loss; P = Postponed

==== Matches ====
On 25 June, the League Two fixtures were revealed.

Win Draw Loss Fixtures

15 August 2026 1	Newport County	3–0	Rochdale	Newport
12:30 BST (UTC+1)	Cameron 18'; Gwengwe 38'; Bamba 90+1'	Report		Stadium: Rodney Parade; Attendance: 4,872; Referee: Harrison Blair

22 August 2026 2	Bristol Rovers	5–3	Newport County	Bristol
12:30 BST (UTC+1)	Purrington 45+1'; Cavegn 53', 90+9'; Jenkins 57' (o.g.); Kamwa 74'	Report	Biggins 1'; Gwengwe 61'; Jarvis 90+1'	Stadium: Memorial Stadium; Attendance: 7,349; Referee: Simon Mather
Note: Fixture was initially schedued for a 15:00 kick-off, but was brought forward.

29 August 2026 3	Newport County	2–2	Tranmere Rovers	Newport
15:00 BST (UTC+1)	Gwengwe 11', 90'	Report	Okoro 71'; Jones 75'	Stadium: Rodney Parade; Attendance: 4,606; Referee: Emily Heaslip

1 September 2026 4	Salford City	2–1	Newport County	Salford
19:45 BST (UTC+1)	Allen 83'; N'Mai 90'	Report	Biggins 71'	Stadium: Moor Lane; Attendance: 2,151; Referee: Matthew Russell

5 September 2026 5	Northampton Town	1–0	Newport County	Northampton
15:00 BST (UTC+1)	O'Brien-Whitmarsh 87'	Report		Stadium: Sixfields Stadium; Attendance: 5,546; Referee: Alan Young

12 September 2026 6	Newport County	1–1	Fleetwood Town	Newport
15:00 BST (UTC+1)	Doidge 38'	Report	Loupalo-Bi 68'	Stadium: Rodney Parade; Attendance: 4,178; Referee: Sunny Singh Gill

19 September 2026 7	Accrington Stanley	0–0	Newport County	Accrington
15:00 BST (UTC+1)		Report		Stadium: Crown Ground; Attendance: 1,743; Referee: Jamie Robinson

26 September 2026 8	Newport County	2–1	Grimsby Town	Newport
15:00 BST (UTC+1)	Doidge 57'; Gwengwe 69'	Report	Wright 83' (o.g.)	Stadium: Rodney Parade; Attendance: 4,973; Referee: Darren Drysdale

3 October 2026 9	Gillingham	0–0	Newport County	Gillingham
15:00 BST (UTC+1)		Report		Stadium: Priestfield Stadium; Attendance: 5,872; Referee: Carl Brook

10 October 2026 10	Newport County	1–0	Colchester United	Newport
15:00 BST (UTC+1)	Nyakuhwa 79'	Report		Stadium: Rodney Parade; Attendance: 4,658; Referee: Oliver Mackey

17 October 2026 11	Newport County	1–1	York City	Newport
15:00 BST (UTC+1)	Etete 54'	Report	Pearce 4'	Stadium: Rodney Parade; Attendance: 5,281; Referee: Neil Hair

20 October 2026 12	Rotherham United	2–2	Newport County	Rotherham
19:45 BST (UTC+1)	Mullin 4' (pen.); Nemane 12'	Report	Biggins 28' (pen.); Garner 54'	Stadium: New York Stadium; Attendance: 6,254; Referee: Callum Jones

24 October 2026 13	Cheltenham Town	1–0	Newport County	Cheltenham
12:30 BST (UTC+1)	McCann 5'	Report		Stadium: Whaddon Road; Attendance: 4,471; Referee: Ben Speedie
Note: Fixture was initially scheduled for a 15:00 kick-off, but was brought forward for live Sky Sports broadcasting.

30 October 2026 14	Newport County	4–1	Chesterfield	Newport
19:45 UTC	Norman 14'; Davies 18'; Biggins 29'; Bamba 45+2'	Report	Mandeville 58'	Stadium: Rodney Parade; Attendance: 4,799; Referee: Zac Kennard-Kettle
Note: Fixture was initially scheduled for 31 October, but was brought forward to the prior evening for live Sky Sports broadcasting.

14 November 2026 15	Crewe Alexandra	2–2	Newport County	Crewe
15:00 UTC	McNeill 77'; Stephenson 90'	Report	Offord 3' (o.g.); Sassi 34'	Stadium: Gresty Road; Attendance: 5,198; Referee: Thomas Parsons

21 November 2026 16	Newport County	2–0	Swindon Town	Newport
12:30 UTC	Lewis 6', 18'	Report		Stadium: Rodney Parade; Attendance: 5,330; Referee: Leigh Doughty
Note: Fixture was initially scheduled for a 15:00 kick-off, but was brought forward for live Sky Sports broadcasting.

28 November 2026 17	Port Vale	v	Newport County	Stoke-on-Trent
15:00 UTC				Stadium: Vale Park

1 December 2026 18	Newport County	v	Walsall	Newport
19:45 UTC				Stadium: Rodney Parade

12 December 2026 19	Crawley Town	v	Newport County	Crawley
15:00 UTC				Stadium: Broadfield Stadium

19 December 2026 20	Newport County	v	Oldham Athletic	Newport
15:00 UTC				Stadium: Rodney Parade

26 December 2026 21	Exeter City	v	Newport County	Exeter
15:00 UTC				Stadium: St James Park

29 December 2026 22	Newport County	v	Shrewsbury Town	Newport
19:45 UTC				Stadium: Rodney Parade

1 January 2027 23	Newport County	v	Barnet	Newport
15:00 UTC				Stadium: Rodney Parade

9 January 2027 24	Oldham Athletic	v	Newport County	Oldham
15:00 UTC				Stadium: Boundary Park

16 January 2027 25	York City	v	Newport County	York
15:00 UTC				Stadium: York Community Stadium

19 January 2027 26	Newport County	v	Rotherham United	Newport
20:00 UTC				Stadium: Rodney Parade
Note: Fixture was initially scheduled for a 19:45 kick-off, but was pushed back for live Sky Sports broadcasting.

23 January 2027 27	Newport County	v	Cheltenham Town	Newport
15:00 UTC				Stadium: Rodney Parade

30 January 2027 28	Chesterfield	v	Newport County	Chesterfield
15:00 UTC				Stadium: SMH Group Stadium

6 February 2027 29	Newport County	v	Tranmere Rovers	Newport
12:30 UTC				Stadium: Rodney Parade
Note: Fixture was initially scheduled for a 15:00 kick-off, but was brought forward for live Sky Sports broadcasting.

=== FA Cup ===
Newport were drawn at home to Walsall in the first round and away to Rochdale in the second round.

Win Draw Loss Fixtures

7 November 2026 First round	Newport County	3–1	Walsall	Newport
15:00 UTC	Etete 19', 60'; Adu-Poku 23'	Report	Dallas 7'	Stadium: Rodney Parade; Attendance: 3,205; Referee: Robert Massey-Ellis

5 December 2026 Second round	Rochdale	v	Newport County	Spotland
15:00 UTC				Stadium: Crown Oil Arena

=== EFL Cup ===
Newport were drawn away to AFC Wimbledon in the first round.

Win Draw Loss Fixtures

8 August 2026 First round	Wimbledon	1–1 (5–4 p)	Newport County	Wimbledon
15:00 BST (UTC+1)	Maycock 90+7'	Report	Bamba 71'	Stadium: Plough Lane; Attendance: 3,393; Referee: Paul Howard
	Penalties
	Browne (penalty scored); Stockley (penalty scored); Tilley (penalty scored); Hippolyte (penalty scored); Seddon (penalty scored)		(penalty scored) Garner; (penalty scored) Norman; (penalty scored) Brennan; (penalty scored) Biggins; * (penalty missed) Smith

=== EFL Trophy ===
==== Group stage ====
Newport were drawn against Plymouth Argyle, Swindon Town and Crystal Palace U21 into Southern Group E.

Pos	Div	Team	Pld	W	PW	PL	L	GF	GA	GD	Pts	Qualification
1	L1	Plymouth Argyle	3	2	1	0	0	9	4	+5	8	Advance to Round 2
2	ACA	Crystal Palace U21	3	2	0	0	1	5	7	−2	6	Advance to Round 2
3	L2	Newport County	3	1	0	1	1	5	4	+1	4	
4	L2	Swindon Town	3	0	0	0	3	2	6	−4	0	

Source: EFL

Win Draw Loss Fixtures

22 September 2026 Group stage	Swindon Town	0–2	Newport County	Swindon
19:00 BST (UTC+1)			Garner 4'; Nyakuhwa 80'	Stadium: County Ground; Attendance: 1,368; Referee: Declan Bourne

6 October 2026 Group stage	Newport County	2–2 (4–5 p)	Plymouth Argyle	Newport
19:00 BST (UTC+1)	K.Evans 3'; Bamba 59' (pen.)	Report	Pepple 75'; Bakinson 90'	Stadium: Rodney Parade; Attendance: 1,697; Referee: Niall Smith
	Penalties
	Adu-Poku (penalty missed); Biggins (penalty scored); Jacob (penalty scored); Doidge (penalty scored); Lewis (penalty scored)		(penalty scored) White; (penalty scored) Irow; (penalty scored) Amaechi; (penalty scored) Pepple; (penalty scored) Ibrahim

3 November 2026 Group stage	Newport County	1–2	Crystal Palace U21	Newport
19:00 UTC	Crole 51'	Report	Judd 10'; Angibeaud 79'	Stadium: Rodney Parade; Attendance: 975; Referee: Scott Jackson

== Statistics ==
=== Appearances and goals ===
As of match played 14 November 2026

Players with no appearances are not included on the list; italics indicated loaned in player

No.	Pos	Nat	Player	Total		League Two		FA Cup		EFL Cup		EFL Trophy	
No.	Pos	Nat	Player	Apps	Goals	Apps	Goals	Apps	Goals	Apps	Goals	Apps	Goals
1	GK	(England) ENG	Jordan Wright	17	0	15+0	0	1+0	0	1+0	0	0+0	0
2	DF	(Wales) WAL	Cameron Evans	11	0	4+2	0	0+1	0	1+0	0	3+0	0
3	DF	(Wales) WAL	Thomas Davies	8	1	3+2	1	1+0	0	1+0	0	0+1	0
4	DF	(Scotland) SCO	Kyle Cameron	16	1	15+0	1	0+0	0	1+0	0	0+0	0
5	DF	(Wales) WAL	Lee Jenkins	18	0	15+0	0	1+0	0	1+0	0	0+1	0
6	DF	(Republic of Ireland) IRL	Ciaran Brennan	18	0	15+0	0	1+0	0	1+0	0	0+1	0
7	MF	(Wales) WAL	Kieron Evans	11	1	2+6	0	0+0	0	0+0	0	2+1	1
8	MF	(Wales) WAL	Matthew Smith	14	0	2+7	0	1+0	0	0+1	0	2+1	0
9	FW	(Malawi) MAW	Shaquille Gwengwe	15	5	9+2	5	0+1	0	1+0	0	1+1	0
10	MF	(England) ENG	Harrison Biggins	19	4	15+0	4	1+0	0	1+0	0	0+2	0
11	FW	(Wales) WAL	James Crole	3	1	0+1	0	0+1	0	0+0	0	1+0	1
12	DF	(Wales) WAL	Joe Thomas	14	0	5+5	0	0+1	0	0+0	0	3+0	0
14	FW	(England) ENG	Moses Alexander-Walker	1	0	0+0	0	0+0	0	0+1	0	0+0	0
16	DF	(England) ENG	Matty Jacob	9	0	8+0	0	0+0	0	0+0	0	0+1	0
17	DF	(England) ENG	Alfie Merritt	9	0	3+2	0	0+0	0	0+1	0	3+0	0
18	MF	(Wales) WAL	Aaron Lewis	6	0	1+2	0	0+1	0	0+0	0	2+0	0
19	FW	(England) ENG	Gerard Garner	13	2	2+7	1	0+0	0	0+1	0	3+0	1
20	FW	(France) FRA	Yahya Bamba	19	4	9+5	2	1+0	0	1+0	1	2+1	1
21	FW	(Wales) WAL	Tanatswa Nyakuhwa	6	2	1+4	1	0+0	0	0+0	0	1+0	1
22	DF	(England) ENG	Cameron Norman	16	1	14+0	1	1+0	0	1+0	0	0+0	0
23	FW	(England) ENG	Michael Adu-Poku	14	1	7+4	0	1+0	1	0+0	0	0+2	0
24	MF	(New Zealand) NZL	Matt Dibley-Dias	12	0	9+2	0	0+0	0	0+0	0	0+1	0
25	GK	(England) ENG	Jake Turner	2	0	0+0	0	0+0	0	0+0	0	2+0	0
27	FW	(Wales) WAL	Christian Doidge	10	2	8+0	2	0+0	0	1+0	0	0+1	0
28	FW	(England) ENG	Kion Etete	6	3	2+3	1	1+0	2	0+0	0	0+0	0
29	MF	(Wales) WAL	Keenan Patten	1	0	0+1	0	0+0	0	0+0	0	0+0	0
33	GK	(England) ENG	Shaun MacDonald	1	0	0+0	0	0+0	0	0+0	0	1+0	0
34	DF	(England) ENG	Dan Sassi	9	1	1+3	1	1+0	0	0+1	0	3+0	0
36	MF	(Wales) WAL	Harri Pugh	1	0	0+0	0	0+0	0	0+0	0	1+0	0
38	DF	(England) ENG	Harrison Halpin	1	0	0+0	0	0+0	0	0+0	0	0+1	0
40	FW	(Wales) WAL	Cole Jarvis	4	1	0+2	1	0+0	0	0+0	0	2+0	0
41	DF	(Wales) WAL	Rocco Lenney	1	0	0+0	0	0+0	0	0+0	0	1+0	0

== Awards ==
=== Player awards ===
==== EFL League Two Player of the Month ====
Month	Player	Result	Ref.
August	(Malawi) Shaquille Gwengwe	Nominated	

==== EFL League Two Goal of the Month ====
Month	Player	Result	Ref.
September	(England) Harrison Biggins	Nominated	
