= 2025–26 Newport County A.F.C. season =

Welsh association football club season

Newport County
2025–26 season
- Owner: Huw Jenkins 52%, Newport County AFC Supporters Trust 27%, Other investors 21%
- Manager: David Hughes (until 15 November 2025); Christian Fuchs (from 20 November 2025 to 27 June 2026)
- Stadium: Rodney Parade
- League Two: 20th
- FA Cup: Second Round
- EFL Cup: Second Round
- EFL Trophy: Group Stage
- Top goalscorer: League: Nathan Opoku (6); All: Nathan Opoku (6)
- Highest home attendance: 6,146 v Crawley Town (3 April 2026), EFL League 2
- Lowest home attendance: 838 v Exeter City (11 November 2025), EFL Trophy Southern Group A
- Average home league attendance: 4,317
Home colours	Away colours	Third colours

The 2025–26 season was the 114th season in the history of Newport County Association Football Club and their thirteenth consecutive season in EFL League Two. In addition to the league, the club participated in the FA Cup, the EFL Cup, and the EFL Trophy. A 2–1 win at Barrow on the final day of the season ensured that Newport finished 20th in League Two and avoided relegation.

== Managerial changes ==
Prior to the season starting, David Hughes was appointed as the club's new manager on a two-year contract with Wayne Hatswell returning to the club as Assistant Manager. On 15 November 2025, Hughes and Hatswell were sacked by Newport with the club bottom of League Two on 11 points after 16 league games of the 2025–26 season and a win ratio of 18.18% from 22 games in all competitions. Christian Fuchs was appointed Newport County manager on 20 November 2025, his first managerial appointment. On 27 June 2026 Fuchs resigned as Newport County manager.

== Transfers and contracts ==
=== In ===
Date	Pos	Player	From	Fee	Ref
16 June 2025 (Note: The transfer would become official on 1 July once his contract at St Johnstone had expired)	DM	(Wales) Matthew Smith	(Scotland) St Johnstone	Free	
17 June 2025 (Note: The transfer would become official on 1 July once his contract at Northampton had expired)	GK	(New Zealand) Nik Tzanev	(England) Northampton Town	Free	
19 June 2025 (Note: The transfer would become official on 1 July once his contract at Barrow had expired)	CF	(England) Ged Garner	(England) Barrow	Free	
23 June 2025 (Note: The transfer would become official on 1 July once his contract at Haverfordwest had expired)	CB	(Wales) Lee Jenkins	(Wales) Haverfordwest County	Free	
30 June 2025 (Note: The transfer would become official on 1 July once his contract at Grimsby had expired)	GK	(England) Jordan Wright	(England) Grimsby Town	Free	
6 August 2025	RB	(Wales) Liam Shephard	(England) Salford City	Free	
7 October 2025	GK	(England) Shaun MacDonald	(England) Exeter City	Free	
24 October 2025	CB	(England) Akin Odimayo	(England) Northampton Town	Free	
14 January 2026	CF	(Wales) James Crole	(Wales) Penybont	Undisclosed	
16 January 2026	FW	(Scotland) Lewis Jamieson	(United States) Sacramento Republic	Free	
3 February 2026	CM	(Wales) Cole Jarvis	(Wales) Merthyr Town	Undisclosed	

=== Out ===
Date	Pos.	Player	To	Fee	Ref.
6 August 2025	GK	(England) Jacob Carney	(Northern Ireland) Glenavon	Free	
28 August 2025	FW	(England) Oliver Greaves	(England) Buxton	Free	
1 January 2026	MF	(Wales) Morgan Evans	(Wales) Llanelli Town	Free	
1 January 2026	DF	(Wales) Sam Watkins	(England) Bristol Manor Farm	Free	
2 January 2026	DF	(England) Akin Odimayo	(England) Crawley Town	Free	
22 January 2026	DF	(England) James Clarke	Retired		
23 January 2026	MF	(England) Cameron Antwi	(England) Gillingham	Undisclosed	
2 February 2026	GK	(New Zealand) Nik Tzanev	(England) Huddersfield Town	Free	
2 February 2026	MF	(Wales) Kai Whitmore	(Singapore) Young Lions	Free	
3 February 2026	MF	(England) Corey Evans	Released	Free	
30 June 2026	DF	(England) Anthony Glennon	Released	Free	
30 June 2026	DF	(Portugal) Nelson Sanca	(England) Chippenham Town	Free	
30 June 2026	MF	(Wales) Riley Lonergan	(Wales) Newport City	Free	
30 June 2026	DF	(England) Jaden Warner	(England) Farnborough	Free	
30 June 2026	FW	(England) Courtney Baker-Richardson	(England) Tranmere Rovers	Free	
30 June 2026	MF	(Wales) Jac Norris	(England) Bristol Manor Farm	Free	
30 June 2026	FW	(England) Michael Spellman	(England) Gateshead	Free	
30 June 2026	DF	(Wales) Liam Shephard	(Wales) Penybont	Free	
30 June 2026	FW	(Cameroon) Bobby Kamwa	(England) Bristol Rovers	Free	
30 June 2026	DF	(Wales) Matt Baker	(England) Notts County	Compensation	

=== Loaned out ===
Date	Pos.	Player	To	Date until	Ref.
6 August 2025	CM	(Wales) Riley Lonergan	(Wales) Cardiff Metropolitan University	12 January 2026	
8 August 2025	RW	(Wales) Morgan Evans	(Wales) Llanelli Town	31 December 2025	
29 August 2025	CAM	(England) Corey Evans	(England) Yate Town	12 January 2026	
29 August 2025	CB	(Portugal) Nelson Sanca	(Wales) Llanelli Town	12 January 2026	
29 August 2025	MF	(Wales) Jac Norris	(Wales) Llanelli Town	12 January 2026	
30 January 2026	SS	(England) Moses Alexander-Walker	(England) Bath City	31 May 2026	
2 February 2026	MF	(Wales) Jac Norris	(Wales) Barry Town United	31 May 2026	
2 February 2026	MF	(Wales) Keenan Patten	(Wales) Barry Town United	31 May 2026	
6 February 2026	CM	(Wales) Riley Lonergan	(Wales) Newport City	31 May 2026	

=== New contracts ===
Date	Pos	Player	Contract until	Ref
17 June 2025	CB	(England) James Clarke	30 June 2026	
2 July 2025	SS	(England) Moses Alexander-Walker	Undisclosed (Note: First professional contract)	
2 July 2025	AM	(England) Corey Evans	Undisclosed	
2 July 2025	RW	(Wales) Morgan Evans	Undisclosed	
2 July 2025	CM	(Wales) Riley Lonergan	Undisclosed	
2 July 2025	RB	(Wales) Sam Watkins	Undisclosed	

== Pre-season and friendlies ==
On 28 May, Newport County announced their first pre-season friendly, against Weston-super-Mare. Five days later a second fixture was confirmed against Worcester City. A third was shortly added after, against Torquay United. A fortnight later, a further two friendlies were added against Pontypridd United and Bristol City.

An XI side would also travel to Barry Town United.

Win Draw Loss Fixtures

1 July 2025 Friendly	Pontypridd United	1–1	Newport County	Pontypridd
19:30 BST (UTC+1)	60'	Report	Davies 50'	Stadium: USW Sports Park

5 July 2025 Friendly	Undy	0–1	Newport County	Undy
13:00 BST (UTC+1)		Report	Glennon	Stadium: The Causeway

12 July 2025 Friendly	Worcester City	0–1	Newport County	Worcester
15:00 BST (UTC+1)		Report	Greaves 34'	Stadium: Sixways Stadium

15 July 2025 Friendly	Weston-super-Mare	0–1	Newport County	Weston-super-Mare
19:15 BST (UTC+1)		Report	Alexander-Walker 88'	Stadium: The Optima Stadium

19 July 2025 Friendly	Torquay United	3–1	Newport County	Torquay
15:00 BST (UTC+1)	Morgan 23'; Dyer 28'; Dennis 39'	Report	Kamwa 90+2'	Stadium: Plainmoor

22 July 2025 Friendly	Bristol City	1–0	Newport County	Failand
12:00 BST (UTC+1)	Morrison 89'	Report		Stadium: Robins High Performance Centre; Attendance: 0 (Behind-closed-doors)

25 July 2025 Friendly	Barry Town United	2–0	Newport County XI	Barry
19:30 BST (UTC+1)	Owen 8'; Hulbert 40'	Report		Stadium: Jenner Park Stadium

== Competitions ==
=== League Two ===
==== League table ====
Pos	Team	Pld	W	D	L	GF	GA	GD	Pts
18	Cheltenham Town	46	14	10	22	53	79	−26	52
19	Shrewsbury Town	46	13	10	23	42	69	−27	49
20	Newport County	46	12	7	27	48	77	−29	43
21	Tranmere Rovers	46	10	11	25	54	79	−25	41
22	Crawley Town	46	8	16	22	44	68	−24	40

Source: EFL Official Website
Rules for classification: 1) Points; 2) Goal difference; 3) Number of goals scored; 4) Head-to-head results; 5) Wins; 6) Away goals; 7) Penalty points (sec 9.5); 8) 12-point sending off offences

==== Results summary ====
Overall								Home						Away					
Pld	W	D	L	GF	GA	GD	Pts	W	D	L	GF	GA	GD	W	D	L	GF	GA	GD
46	12	7	27	48	77	−29	43	6	4	13	24	37	−13	6	3	14	24	40	−16

Last updated: 2 May 2026.
Source: Soccerway

==== Results by round ====
Round	1	2	3	4	5	6	7	8	9	10	11	12	13	14	15	16	17	18	19	20	21	22	23	24	27	28	29	30	31	26^{2}	32	33	34	35	25^{1}	36	37	38	39	40	41	42	43	44	45	46
Ground	H	A	A	A	H	A	H	A	H	A	H	A	H	A	H	A	A	H	A	H	A	H	H	A	A	H	H	A	H	A	A	A	H	A	H	H	A	H	A	H	H	A	H	A	H	A
Result	D	W	L	L	L	L	L	D	L	L	L	W	L	W	L	L	L	D	D	L	L	D	W	L	L	W	L	L	D	L	L	W	L	D	W	L	W	L	L	W	L	L	W	L	W	W
Position	13	9	14	16	19	20	22	22	22	22	24	23	24	24	24	24	24	24	24	24	24	23	23	23	24	23	23	23	23	23	24	24	24	24	22	23	21	22	22	22	22	22	22	22	21	20

Source: Soccerway
A = Away; H = Home; W = Win; D = Draw; L = Loss; P = Postponed
Notes:
- ^{1} Matchday 25 (vs Tranmere Rovers) was postponed due to a frozen pitch.
- ^{2} Matchday 26 (vs Swindon Town) was postponed due to their FA Cup progression.

==== Matches ====
Win Draw Loss Fixtures

2 August 2025 1	Newport County	1–1	Notts County	Newport
15:00 BST (UTC+1)	Garner 49'	Report	Jones 65' (pen.)	Stadium: Rodney Parade; Attendance: 5,238; Referee: Jamie O'Connor

9 August 2025 2	Crawley Town	1–2	Newport County	Crawley
15:00 BST (UTC+1)	Anderson 90+6'	Report	Whitmore 68'; Shephard 70'	Stadium: Broadfield Stadium; Attendance: 3,198; Referee: James Oldham

16 August 2025 3	Grimsby Town	2–1	Newport County	Cleethorpes
15:00 BST (UTC+1)	Baker-Richardson 1' (o.g.); Green 90+4'	Report	Baker 55'	Stadium: Blundell Park; Attendance: 6,402; Referee: Zac Kennard-Kettle

19 August 2025 4	Newport County	0–1	Salford City	Newport
19:30 BST (UTC+1)		Report	Oluwo 51'	Stadium: Rodney Parade; Attendance: 3,525; Referee: James Durkin

23 August 2025 5	Newport County	1–2	Milton Keynes Dons	Newport
12:30 BST (UTC+1)	Ogunneye 6'	Report	Méndez-Laing 45+1' (.pen); Paterson 51'	Stadium: Rodney Parade; Attendance: 3,821; Referee: Stuart Morland
Note: Fixture was originally scheduled for a 15:00 kick-off, but was moved live Sky Sports broadcasting.

30 August 2025 6	Cambridge United	2–0	Newport County	Cambridge
15:00 BST (UTC+1)	Watts 38'; Brophy 75'	Report		Stadium: Abbey Stadium; Attendance: 5,887; Referee: Gareth Rhodes

6 September 2025 7	Newport County	2–3	Bristol Rovers	Newport
12:30 BST (UTC+1)	Whitmore 78'; Opoku 89'	Report	Thomas 52', 59'; Harrison 72'	Stadium: Rodney Parade; Attendance: 5,305; Referee: Oliver Mackey
Note: Fixture was originally scheduled for a 15:00 kick-off, but was moved live Sky Sports broadcasting.

13 September 2025 8	Tranmere Rovers	1–1	Newport County	Birkenhead
15:00 BST (UTC+1)	Joseph 33'	Report	Baker-Richardson 87'	Stadium: Prenton Park; Attendance: 6,345; Referee: Alan Young

20 September 2025 9	Newport County	1–3	Gillingham	Newport
15:00 BST (UTC+1)	Opoku 1'	Report	Dack 23', 45' (pen.); Smith 36'	Stadium: Rodney Parade; Attendance: 4,022; Referee: Leigh Doughty

27 September 2025 10	Chesterfield	4–1	Newport County	Chesterfield
15:00 BST (UTC+1)	Grigg 34'; Dickson 43'; Darcy 84'; Markanday 88'	Report	Spellman 80'	Stadium: SMH Group Stadium; Attendance: 7,726; Referee: Stephen Parkinson

4 October 2025 11	Newport County	0–1	Swindon Town	Newport
12:30 BST (UTC+1)		Report	Palmer 10'	Stadium: Rodney Parade; Attendance: 4,565; Referee: Declan Bourne
Note: Fixture was originally scheduled for a 15:00 kick-off, but was moved on police advice.

11 October 2025 12	Accrington Stanley	0–1	Newport County	Accrington
15:00 BST (UTC+1)		Report	Sinclair 43' (o.g.)	Stadium: Crown Ground; Attendance: 2,074; Referee: David Rock

18 October 2025 13	Newport County	0–2	Cheltenham Town	Newport
15:00 BST (UTC+1)		Report	Young 20', 61'	Stadium: Rodney Parade; Attendance: 4,910; Referee: Peter Wright

25 October 2025 14	Harrogate Town	0–3	Newport County	Harrogate
15:00 BST (UTC+1)		Report	Baker-Richardson 12'; Faulkner 49' (o.g.); Antwi 51'	Stadium: Wetherby Road; Attendance: 2,822; Referee: Simon Mather

8 November 2025 15	Newport County	2–4	Walsall	Newport
15:00 UTC	Whitmore 16'; Garner 44'	Report	Kanu 17'; Finnigan 19', 37'; Browne 52'	Stadium: Rodney Parade; Attendance: 4,300; Referee: Ben Atkinson

15 November 2025 16	Shrewsbury Town	1–0	Newport County	Shrewsbury
15:00 UTC	Scully 51'	Report		Stadium: New Meadow; Attendance: 6,120; Referee: Elliott Swallow

22 November 2025 17	Oldham Athletic	3–0	Newport County	Oldham
15:00 UTC	Hawkes 53', 89'; Quigley 75'	Report		Stadium: Boundary Park; Attendance: 7,056; Referee: Andrew Miller

29 November 2025 18	Newport County	2–2	Barrow	Newport
15:00 UTC	Glennon 39'; Baker-Richardson 63'	Report	Whitfield 45'; Smith 84'	Stadium: Rodney Parade; Attendance: 3,624; Referee: Carl Brook

10 December 2025 19	Crewe Alexandra	2–2	Newport County	Crewe
19:45 UTC	Tezgel 11'; March 78'	Report	Connolly 48' (o.g.); Antwi 90+3'	Stadium: Gresty Road; Attendance: 3,895; Referee: Edward Duckworth
Note: Fixture was initially scheduled for 9 December, but was rescheduled due to also being in FA Cup involvements on the preceding Sunday.

13 December 2025 20	Newport County	0–2	Fleetwood Town	Newport
15:00 UTC		Report	Potter 44'; Graydon 45+4'	Stadium: Rodney Parade; Attendance: 3,358; Referee: Matthew Corlett

20 December 2025 21	Colchester United	4–1	Newport County	Colchester
15:00 UTC	Lisbie 22'; Tovide 43'; Mbick 64'; Payne 90+6'	Report	Braybrooke 66'	Stadium: Colchester Community Stadium; Attendance: 4,717; Referee: Harry Wager

26 December 2025 22	Newport County	0–0	Barnet	Newport
15:00 UTC		Report		Stadium: Rodney Parade; Attendance: 4,219; Referee: Stephen Parkinson

29 December 2025 23	Newport County	2–0	Crewe Alexandra	Newport
19:45 UTC	Baker-Richardson 28'; Braybrooke 76'	Report		Stadium: Rodney Parade; Attendance: 3,925; Referee: Abigail Byrne

1 January 2026 24	Bromley	2–1	Newport County	Bromley
15:00 UTC	Baker-Richardson 45+3' (o.g.); Kabamba 74'	Report	Opoku 87'	Stadium: Hayes Lane; Attendance: 4,946; Referee: Kirsty Dowle

17 January 2026 27	Gillingham	3–2	Newport County	Gillingham
15:00 UTC	Masterson 30'; Little 90+1'; McCleary 90+9'	Report	Spellman 4'; Antwi 84'	Stadium: Priestfield Stadium; Attendance: 5,548; Referee: Carl Brook

24 January 2026 28	Newport County	2–1	Chesterfield	Newport
15:00 UTC	Biggins 50'; Spellman 63'	Report	Markanday 85'	Stadium: Rodney Parade; Attendance: 4,355; Referee: Declan Brown

27 January 2026 29	Newport County	1–4	Accrington Stanley	Newport
19:30 UTC	Opoku 35'	Report	Henderson 2'; Sinclair 51'; Madden 82'; Heath 90+2'	Stadium: Rodney Parade; Attendance: 3,563; Referee: James Durkin

31 January 2026 30	Bristol Rovers	3–0	Newport County	Bristol
12:30 UTC	Akhamrich 11', 29'; Cavegn 88'	Report		Stadium: Memorial Stadium; Attendance: 8,591; Referee: Will Finnie

7 February 2026 31	Newport County	0–0	Grimsby Town	Newport
15:00 UTC		Report		Stadium: Rodney Parade; Attendance: 3,898; Referee: Declan Bourne

11 February 2026 26	Swindon Town	2–0	Newport County	Swindon
20:00 UTC	Holman 63'; Thomas 66' (o.g.)	Report		Stadium: County Ground; Attendance: 6,810; Referee: Darren Drysdale
Note: Fixture was originally scheduled for 10 January 2026 but was rearranged due to Swindon's FA Cup progression.

14 February 2026 32	Milton Keynes Dons	1–0	Newport County	Milton Keynes
15:00 UTC	Collins 1'	Report		Stadium: Stadium MK; Attendance: 7,444; Referee: Harrison Blair

17 February 2026 33	Salford City	1–3	Newport County	Salford
19:45 UTC	Woodburn 90+4'	Report	Delaney 13'; Lloyd 56'; Opoku 59'	Stadium: Moor Lane; Attendance: 2,236; Referee: David Rock

21 February 2026 34	Newport County	0–2	Cambridge United	Newport
15:00 UTC		Report	Bennett 73'; Kaikai 76'	Stadium: Rodney Parade; Attendance: 4,155; Referee: Lewis Sandoe

28 February 2026 35	Fleetwood Town	0–0	Newport County	Fleetwood
15:00 UTC		Report		Stadium: Highbury Stadium; Attendance: 2,506; Referee: Scott Jackson

3 March 2026 25	Newport County	3–1	Tranmere Rovers	Newport
19:45 UTC	Spellman 36', 90+6'; Evans 88'	Report	Finley 2'	Stadium: Rodney Parade; Attendance: 3,656; Referee: Isaac Searle
Note: Fixture was originally scheduled for 4 January 2026 but was postponed due to a frozen pitch.

7 March 2026 36	Newport County	1–2	Colchester United	Newport
15:00 UTC	Jenkins 90+7'	Report	Anderson 58'; Payne 64'	Stadium: Rodney Parade; Attendance: 4,328; Referee: Steven Copeland

14 March 2026 37	Barnet	1–2	Newport County	Edgware, London
15:00 UTC	Stead 32'	Report	Kamwa 65'; Crole 83'	Stadium: The Hive Stadium; Attendance: 2,256; Referee: Oliver Mackey

17 March 2026 38	Newport County	0–1	Bromley	Newport
19:30 UTC		Report	Whitely 88'	Stadium: Rodney Parade; Attendance: 3,530; Referee: Paul Howard

21 March 2026 39	Walsall	2–1	Newport County	Walsall
15:00 UTC	Kanu 62'; Pattison 90+7'	Report	Biggins 38'	Stadium: Bescot Stadium; Attendance: 6,652; Referee: Ross Joyce

28 March 2026 40	Newport County	1–0	Shrewsbury Town	Newport
15:00 UTC	Kamwa 68'	Report		Stadium: Rodney Parade; Attendance: 4,806; Referee: Elliot Bell

3 April 2026 41	Newport County	0–2	Crawley Town	Newport
15:00 BST (UTC+1)			McKirdy 57', 59'	Stadium: Rodney Parade; Attendance: 6,146; Referee: Lewis Smith

6 April 2026 42	Notts County	3–1	Newport County	Nottingham
15:00 BST (UTC+1)	Ness 19', 23'; Luker 86'	Report	Biggins 65'	Stadium: Meadow Lane; Attendance: 11,431; Referee: Edward Duckworth

11 April 2026 43	Newport County	2–1	Harrogate Town	Newport
15:00 BST (UTC+1)	Opoku 8'; Thomas 57'	Report	Evans 39'	Stadium: Rodney Parade; Attendance: 4,337; Referee: Neil Hair

18 April 2026 44	Cheltenham Town	1–0	Newport County	Cheltenham
15:00 BST (UTC+1)	Miller 82'	Report		Stadium: Whaddon Road; Attendance: 4,658; Referee: Simon Mather

25 April 2026 45	Newport County	3–2	Oldham Athletic	Newport
15:00 BST (UTC+1)	Kamwa 9', 90+18'; Lloyd 46'	Report	Sutton 29'; Simeu 35'	Stadium: Rodney Parade; Attendance: 5,706; Referee: David Rock

2 May 2026 46	Barrow	1–2	Newport County	Barrow-in-Furness
15:00 BST (UTC+1)	McCann 9'	Report	Davies 76'; Kamwa 83'	Stadium: Holker Street; Attendance: 3,588; Referee: Jacob Miles

=== FA Cup ===
Win Draw Loss Fixtures

1 November 2025 First round	Newport County	2–2 (4–3 p)	Gillingham	Newport
15:00 UTC	Cameron Evans 32'; Antwi 109'	Report	Nevitt 14'; Palmer-Houlden 118'	Stadium: Rodney Parade; Attendance: 2,596; Referee: Ross Martin
	Penalties
	Baker-Richardson (penalty scored); Braybrooke (penalty missed); Antwi (penalty scored); Kamwa (penalty scored); Lloyd (penalty scored)		(penalty scored) Clark; (penalty missed) Hutton; (penalty missed) Vokes; (penalty scored) Khumbeni; (penalty scored) Palmer-Houlden

7 December 2025 Second round	Boreham Wood	3–0	Newport County	Borehamwood
14:30 UTC	King 32'; Booty 32'; Rush 32'	Report		Stadium: Meadow Park; Attendance: 1,825; Referee: Paul Howard

=== EFL Cup ===
Newport County took part in a Preliminary Round of the EFL Cup due to the number of Premier League teams being involved in European competitions. They faced Barnet with the home team and fixture date confirmed on 26 June 2025.

Win Draw Loss Fixtures

29 July 2025 Preliminary round	Barnet	2–2 (2–4 p)	Newport County	Edgware, London
19:30 BST (UTC+1)	Galvin 90+7'; Browne 90+9'	Report	Antwi 31'; Reindorf 42'	Stadium: The Hive Stadium; Attendance: 1,789; Referee: Darren Drysdale
	Penalties
	Adeniran (penalty scored); Browne (penalty scored); Hugill (penalty missed); Smith (penalty missed)		(penalty missed) Garner; (penalty scored) Lloyd; (penalty scored) Antwi; (penalty scored) Kamwa; (penalty scored) Cameron Evans

12 August 2025 First round	Newport County	0–1	Millwall	Newport
19:30 BST (UTC+1)		Report	Leonard 60'	Stadium: Rodney Parade; Attendance: 2,617; Referee: Scott Oldham

=== EFL Trophy ===
In the group stage, Newport were drawn into Southern Group A alongside Cardiff City, Exeter City and Arsenal Under 21's.

Pos	Div	Team	Pld	W	PW	PL	L	GF	GA	GD	Pts	Qualification
1	L1	Cardiff City	3	2	0	0	1	4	2	+2	6	Advance to Round 2
2	L1	Exeter City	3	2	0	0	1	5	4	+1	6	Advance to Round 2
3	L2	Newport County	3	1	0	0	2	2	3	−1	3	
4	ACA	Arsenal U21	3	1	0	0	2	6	8	−2	3	

Source: EFL

Win Draw Loss Fixtures

23 September 2025 Group stage	Newport County	1–2	Arsenal Under-21	Newport
19:30 BST (UTC+1)	Lloyd 2'	Report	Harriman-Annous 58' (pen.); Sagoe 89'	Stadium: Rodney Parade; Attendance: 1,218; Referee: Aaron Farmer

7 October 2025 Group stage	Cardiff City	0–1	Newport County	Cardiff
19:45 BST (UTC+1)		Report	Davies 43'	Stadium: Cardiff City Stadium; Attendance: 8,505; Referee: Ollie Yates

11 November 2025 Group stage	Newport County	0–1	Exeter City	Newport
19:00 UTC		Report	Turns 50'	Stadium: Rodney Parade; Attendance: 838; Referee: Scott Jackson

== Statistics ==
=== Appearances and goals ===
Players with no appearances are not included on the list; italics indicate a loaned in player

No.	Pos	Nat	Player	Total		League Two		FA Cup		EFL Cup		EFL Trophy	
No.	Pos	Nat	Player	Apps	Goals	Apps	Goals	Apps	Goals	Apps	Goals	Apps	Goals
2	DF	(Wales) WAL	Cameron Evans	41	2	27+8	1	1+0	1	1+1	0	1+2	0
3	DF	(England) ENG	Anthony Glennon	25	1	16+5	1	0+0	0	1+1	0	2+0	0
4	DF	(Wales) WAL	Matt Baker	41	1	37+1	1	0+0	0	2+0	0	1+0	0
5	MF	(Austria) AUT	Sven Sprangler	18	0	18+0	0	0+0	0	0+0	0	0+0	0
6	DF	(Republic of Ireland) IRL	Ciaran Brennan	28	0	10+13	0	0+1	0	0+1	0	2+1	0
7	FW	(Cameroon) CMR	Bobby Kamwa	46	5	29+11	5	0+1	0	1+1	0	3+0	0
8	MF	(Wales) WAL	Matthew Smith	22	0	13+8	0	0+0	0	1+0	0	0+0	0
9	FW	(England) ENG	Courtney Baker-Richardson	35	4	18+12	4	1+0	0	2+0	0	1+1	0
10	MF	(England) ENG	Harrison Biggins	20	2	18+2	2	0+0	0	0+0	0	0+0	0
12	DF	(Wales) WAL	Joe Thomas	33	1	16+13	1	1+0	0	1+0	0	0+2	0
15	DF	(Wales) WAL	Lee Jenkins	39	1	31+3	1	1+0	0	1+1	0	2+0	0
16	FW	(Wales) WAL	James Crole	20	1	11+9	1	0+0	0	0+0	0	0+0	0
17	DF	(Wales) WAL	Thomas Davies	35	2	25+8	1	0+0	0	1+0	0	1+0	1
18	DF	(Wales) WAL	Liam Shephard	14	1	12+2	1	0+0	0	0+0	0	0+0	0
19	FW	(England) ENG	Gerard Garner	28	2	15+10	2	1+0	0	0+1	0	1+0	0
20	MF	(Wales) WAL	Ben Lloyd	41	4	21+15	3	1+0	0	2+0	0	2+0	1
21	FW	(England) ENG	Michael Spellman	39	5	21+14	5	0+0	0	0+1	0	1+2	0
22	FW	(Scotland) SCO	Lewis Jamieson	3	0	1+2	0	0+0	0	0+0	0	0+0	0
23	DF	(Republic of Ireland) IRL	Ryan Delaney	17	1	16+1	1	0+0	0	0+0	0	0+0	0
24	FW	(Ghana) GHA	Nathan Opoku	32	6	16+14	6	0+0	0	0+0	0	1+1	0
27	FW	(England) ENG	Moses Alexander-Walker	4	0	0+3	0	0+0	0	0+0	0	0+1	0
28	GK	(England) ENG	Jordan Wright	39	0	35+0	0	1+0	0	1+0	0	2+0	0
32	DF	(England) ENG	Jaden Warner	3	0	1+0	0	0+0	0	0+0	0	1+1	0
33	FW	(Wales) WAL	Tanatswa Nyakuhwa	7	0	0+7	0	0+0	0	0+0	0	0+0	0
36	MF	(Wales) WAL	Harri Pugh	1	0	0+0	0	0+0	0	0+0	0	0+1	0
39	MF	(Wales) WAL	Myles McKenzie	1	0	0+0	0	0+0	0	0+0	0	0+1	0
40	FW	(Wales) WAL	Cole Jarvis	11	0	2+9	0	0+0	0	0+0	0	0+0	0
Players who featured but departed the club during the season:
1	GK	(New Zealand) NZL	Nik Tzanev	13	0	11+0	0	0+0	0	1+0	0	1+0	0
5	DF	(England) ENG	James Clarke	15	0	10+2	0	0+0	0	2+0	0	1+0	0
11	MF	(England) ENG	Cameron Antwi	28	5	18+6	3	1+0	1	2+0	1	1+0	0
14	MF	(Wales) WAL	Kai Whitmore	21	3	13+4	3	1+0	0	1+0	0	2+0	0
22	DF	(England) ENG	Habeeb Ogunneye	20	1	14+1	1	1+0	0	1+0	0	3+0	0
23	FW	(England) ENG	Michael Reindorf	21	1	10+6	0	0+1	0	1+1	1	1+1	0
25	DF	(England) ENG	Akin Odimayo	6	0	3+2	0	0+1	0	0+0	0	0+0	0
44	MF	(England) ENG	Sammy Braybrooke	21	2	17+0	2	1+0	0	0+0	0	3+0	0
