= Habeeb Ogunneye =

English footballer (born 2005)

Personal information
- Full name: Habeeb Omotolani Oluwatoyin Ogunneye
- Date of birth: 12 November 2005 (age 20)
- Place of birth: Hackney, England
- Height: 5 ft 10 in (1.79 m)
- Position: Right-back

Team information
- Current team: Arsenal
- Number: 62

Youth career
- 2022–2025: Manchester United
- 2026–: Arsenal

Senior career*
Years	Team	Apps	(Gls)
2025–2026	Manchester United	0	(0)
2025–2026	→ Newport County (loan)	15	(1)
2026–	Arsenal	0	(0)

International career
2021–2022	England U17	3	(0)
- * Club domestic league appearances and goals as of 16:54, 14 January 2026 (UTC)

Habeeb Omotolani Oluwatoyin Ogunneye (born 12 November 2005) is an English professional footballer who plays as a right-back for Premier League club Arsenal.

== Career ==
At age 15, Ogunneye debuted for the under-18 team of English Premier League side Manchester United. He has played in the UEFA Youth League for the club's youth academy.

Ogunneye mainly operates as a defender. He has been described as "likes to join the attack and help his team on the offensive".

On 15 July 2025 Ogunneye joined EFL League Two club Newport County on loan for the 2025–26 season. He made his debut for Newport on 9 August 2025 in the 2–1 league win against Crawley Town. Ogunneye scored his first Newport goal on 23 August 2025 in the 2–1 league defeat to Milton Keynes Dons.

== International career ==
Ogunneye is eligible to represent both England (through birth) and Nigeria (through heritage). He has featured for the England U17 team, making three appearances between 2021 and 2022. As of 2024, Ogunneye faced a decision regarding his senior international allegiance, with both nations actively monitoring his progress. England U21 manager Lee Carsley has publicly identified him as a "possible future star," indicating The Football Association's desire to secure his commitment.

== Career statistics ==
=== Club ===
As of 14 January 2026

Appearances and goals by club, season and competition
Club	Season	League			FA Cup		EFL Cup		Other		Total	
Club	Season	Division	Apps	Goals	Apps	Goals	Apps	Goals	Apps	Goals	Apps	Goals
Manchester United U21	2023–24	—			—		—		1 (Note: Appearance(s) in EFL Trophy)	0	1	0
Manchester United U21	2024–25	—			—		—		3	0	3	0
Manchester United U21	2025–26	—			—		—		0	0	0	0
Manchester United U21	Total				—		—		4	0	4	0
Newport County (loan)	2025–26	League Two	15	1	2	0	1	0	3	0	21	1
Career Total			15	1	2	0	1	0	7	0	25	1
