= Moses Alexander-Walker =

Association football player

Personal information
- Full name: Moses Harrison Alexander-Walker
- Date of birth: 27 July 2007 (age 19)
- Place of birth: Bristol, England
- Position: Winger

Team information
- Current team: Newport County
- Number: 14

Youth career
- 2016–2021: Bristol City
- 2021–2025: Newport County

Senior career*
Years	Team	Apps	(Gls)
2025–	Newport County	4	(0)
2025	→ Bath City (loan)	12	(0)
- * Club domestic league appearances and goals as of 11:51, 30 April 2026 (UTC)

Moses Harrison Alexander-Walker (born 27 July 2007) is an English footballer who plays as a winger for EFL League Two club Newport County.

== Club career ==
=== Bristol City ===
Alexander-Walker started his career in the Bristol City academy in 2016, and was with the club until 2021 when he was turned down for a scholarship.

=== Newport County ===
Alexander-Walker signed for EFL League Two club Newport County's academy aged 16 in July 2023. He was identified by Newport's academy manager Luke Hussey who had worked with Alexander-Walker since he was nine years old.

He made his senior debut for Newport County on 3 May 2025 as a 55th-minute substitute in the final League Two fixture of the season against Tranmere Rovers. On 5 May 2025 he was selected as Newport County's Academy Scholar of the Season. Alexander-Walker signed his first professional contract with Newport County on 16 May 2025. On 16 July 2025 he scored for Newport in the pre-season 1–0 win against Weston-super-Mare.

On 30 January 2026 Alexander-Walker joined National League South club Bath City on loan for the remainder of the 2025–26 season.

== Career statistics ==
=== Club ===
Appearances and goals by club, season and competition
Club	Season	League			National cup		League cup		Other		Total	
Club	Season	Division	Apps	Goals	Apps	Goals	Apps	Goals	Apps	Goals	Apps	Goals
Newport County	2024-25	League Two	1	0	0	0	0	0	0	0	1	0
Newport County	2025-26	League Two	3	0	1	0	0	0	1	0	5	0
Newport County	2026-27	League Two	0	0	0	0	1	0	0	0	1	0
Newport County	Total		4	0	1	0	1	0	1	0	7	0
Career total			4	0	1	0	1	0	1	0	7	0
