= Cameron Antwi =

English footballer

Personal information
- Full name: Cameron Akwasi Antwi
- Date of birth: 7 October 2001 (age 25)
- Place of birth: London, England
- Height: 1.77 m (5 ft 10 in)
- Position: Midfielder

Team information
- Current team: Gillingham
- Number: 17

Youth career
- Fulham
- 2019–2020: Blackpool

Senior career*
| Years | Team | Apps | (Gls) |
| 2020–2022 | Blackpool | 0 | (0) |
| 2020–2021 | → Southport (loan) | 2 | (0) |
| 2021 | → AFC Telford United (loan) | 8 | (0) |
| 2022–2024 | Cardiff City | 0 | (0) |
| 2024–2026 | Newport County | 64 | (4) |
| 2026– | Gillingham | 9 | (0) |
- * Club domestic league appearances and goals as of 21:21, 14 November 2026 (UTC)

Cameron Akwasi Antwi (born 7 October 2001) is an English professional footballer who plays as a midfielder for EFL League Two club Gillingham.

== Early life ==
Antwi was born in London, England, to Ghanaian parents.

== Career ==
=== Blackpool ===
After playing youth football with Fulham, Antwi moved to Blackpool in 2019, turning professional and joining the first-team in July 2020. He made his debut for Blackpool on 11 November 2020, in a 3–0 win against Leeds United in the EFL Trophy.

On 30 November 2020, he moved on loan to Southport until mid-January.

Antwi joined AFC Telford on a month's loan on 8 October 2021. The loan was extended until January 2022, although Antwi was re-called by Blackpool on 29 December 2021. He was released by the club at the end of the 2021–22 season.

=== Cardiff City ===
Antwi signed for Cardiff City in August 2022. He was offered a new contract at the end of the 2023–24 season.

=== Newport County ===
In July 2024 Antwi signed for Newport County. He made his debut for Newport on 10 August 2024 in the 3–2 EFL League Two defeat to Cheltenham Town. Antwi scored his first Newport goal on 8 February 2025 in the 3–0 League Two win against Crewe Alexandra.

=== Gillingham ===
On 23 January 2026, Antwi signed for Gillingham on a two-and-a-half year contract for an undisclosed fee, having scored against the team days earlier for Newport.

== Career statistics ==
As of match played 14 November 2026

Appearances and goals by club, season and competition
| Club | Season | League | | | FA Cup | | EFL Cup | | Other | | Total | |
| Club | Season | Division | Apps | Goals | Apps | Goals | Apps | Goals | Apps | Goals | Apps | Goals |
|---|---|---|---|---|---|---|---|---|---|---|---|---|
| Blackpool | 2020–21 | League One | 0 | 0 | 0 | 0 | 0 | 0 | 1 (Note: Appearance(s) in the EFL Trophy) | 0 | 1 | 0 |
| Blackpool | 2021–22 | Championship | 0 | 0 | 0 | 0 | 1 | 0 | 0 | 0 | 1 | 0 |
| Blackpool | Total | | 0 | 0 | 0 | 0 | 1 | 0 | 1 | 0 | 2 | 0 |
| Southport (loan) | 2020–21 | National League North | 2 | 0 | 0 | 0 | 0 | 0 | 2 (Note: Appearance(s) in the FA Trophy) | 0 | 4 | 0 |
| AFC Telford United (loan) | 2021–22 | National League North | 8 | 0 | 0 | 0 | 0 | 0 | 2 | 0 | 10 | 0 |
| Cardiff City | 2022–23 | Championship | 0 | 0 | 0 | 0 | 0 | 0 | 0 | 0 | 0 | 0 |
| Cardiff City | 2023–24 | Championship | 0 | 0 | 1 | 0 | 0 | 0 | 0 | 0 | 1 | 0 |
| Cardiff City | Total | | 0 | 0 | 1 | 0 | 0 | 0 | 0 | 0 | 1 | 0 |
| Newport County | 2024–25 | League Two | 40 | 1 | 0 | 0 | 1 | 0 | 2 | 0 | 43 | 1 |
| Newport County | 2025–26 | League Two | 24 | 3 | 1 | 1 | 2 | 1 | 1 | 0 | 28 | 5 |
| Newport County | Total | | 64 | 4 | 1 | 1 | 3 | 1 | 3 | 0 | 71 | 6 |
| Gillingham | 2025–26 | League Two | 5 | 0 | 0 | 0 | 0 | 0 | 0 | 0 | 5 | 0 |
| Gillingham | 2026–27 | League Two | 4 | 0 | 0 | 0 | 0 | 0 | 2 | 1 | 6 | 1 |
| Gillingham | Total | | 9 | 0 | 0 | 0 | 0 | 0 | 2 | 1 | 11 | 1 |
| Career total | | | 83 | 4 | 2 | 1 | 4 | 1 | 10 | 1 | 99 | 7 |
