= Ryan de Havilland =

English footballer (born 2001)

Personal information
- Full name: Ryan James de Havilland
- Date of birth: 15 June 2001 (age 25)
- Place of birth: Wimbledon, England
- Height: 1.77 m (5 ft 10 in)
- Position: Midfielder

Team information
- Current team: Bristol Rovers
- Number: 33

Youth career
- Reading
- 2010–2019: Fulham

Senior career*
Years	Team	Apps	(Gls)
2019–2021	Fulham	0	(0)
2019	→ Metropolitan Police (loan)	4	(0)
2021–2023	Barnet	60	(8)
2021	→ Hayes & Yeading United (loan)	4	(0)
2022	→ Beaconsfield Town (loan)	5	(1)
2023–2026	Peterborough United	50	(3)
2026–	Bristol Rovers	19	(0)

International career^{‡}
2023	England C	1	(1)
- * Club domestic league appearances and goals as of 21:19, 10 November 2026 (UTC) ‡ National team caps and goals as of 15:46, 14 August 2023 (UTC)

Ryan James de Havilland (born 15 June 2001) is an English professional footballer who plays as a midfielder for Bristol Rovers.

== Club career ==
Born in London, de Havilland played youth football for Reading and Fulham. He spent 11 years with Fulham's Academy. He played senior football for the first time when he was loaned out to Metropolitan Police in December 2019. He was released by the Whites at the end of the 2020–21 season.

=== Barnet ===
In October 2021, following a trial period training with Portsmouth, De Havilland joined National League club Barnet.

In November 2021, de Havilland joined Hayes & Yeading United on a one-month loan deal. He made five appearances in his short spell.

In January 2022, de Havilland signed another one-month loan deal, this time with Beaconsfield Town. He made his debut on 15 January, scoring in a 2–0 win over Dorchester Town, as well as making appearances against Taunton Town and Harrow Borough. Following his return from the loan, he made his league debut for Barnet.

=== Peterborough United ===
On 26 June 2023, de Havilland signed for League One club Peterborough United on a four-year deal for an undisclosed fee.

In August 2025, de Havilland's future at the Posh was thrown into doubt after being selected for an under-21 game instead of travelling with the first-team, manager Darren Ferguson naming him as one of five players told to find a new club. Following the closing of the transfer window, chairman Darragh MacAnthony announced he was playing "hardball" with De Havilland after he had turned down a "good move to a good place" for geographical reasons, calling for the midfielder to "come to his senses".

=== Bristol Rovers ===
On 3 January 2026, de Havilland signed for League Two club Bristol Rovers on a two-and-a-half year deal for an undisclosed fee.

Having not been included in the matchday squad of the opening match of the 2026–27 season, manager Steve Evans revealed that de Havilland had been given the opportunity to go out on loan in the midweek leading up to the match, but had chosen not to pursue this move.

== International career ==
De Havilland scored on his debut for England C against Wales C in March 2023.

== Playing style ==
Upon signing for Peterborough, de Havilland was described as a "box to box midfielder" who was "also accomplished with both feet".

== Career statistics ==
As of match played 10 November 2026

Appearances and goals by club, season and competition
Club	Season	League			FA Cup		League Cup		Other		Total	
Club	Season	Division	Apps	Goals	Apps	Goals	Apps	Goals	Apps	Goals	Apps	Goals
Fulham	2019–20	Championship	0	0	0	0	0	0	0	0	0	0
Fulham	2020–21	Premier League	0	0	0	0	0	0	0	0	0	0
Fulham	Total		0	0	0	0	0	0	0	0	0	0
Metropolitan Police (loan)	2019–20	SFL Premier Division South	4	0	0	0	—		1 (Note: Appearance in FA Trophy)	0	5	0
Fulham U21	2020–21	–							3 (Note: Appearance(s) in EFL Trophy)	0	3	0
Barnet	2021–22	National League	18	1	0	0	—		3 (Note: Appearances in Middlesex Senior Cup)	1	21	2
Barnet	2022–23	National League	42	7	4	0	—		6 (Note: Five appearances and one goal in FA Trophy, one appearance in National League play-offs)	1	52	8
Barnet	Total		60	8	4	0	0	0	9	2	73	10
Hayes & Yeading United (loan)	2021–22	SFL Premier Division South	4	0	0	0	—		1 (Note: Appearances in Southern Football League Cup)	0	5	0
Beaconsfield Town (loan)	2021–22	SFL Premier Division South	5	1	0	0	—		1 (Note: Appearances in Berks & Bucks Senior Cup)	0	6	1
Peterborough United	2023–24	League One	22	1	4	0	1	0	6	1	33	2
Peterborough United	2024–25	League One	27	2	3	0	0	0	5	1	35	3
Peterborough United	2025–26	League One	1	0	0	0	0	0	1	0	2	0
Peterborough United	Total		50	3	7	0	1	0	12	1	70	5
Bristol Rovers	2025–26	League Two	19	0	0	0	0	0	1	0	20	0
Bristol Rovers	2026–27	League Two	0	0	0	0	0	0	3	0	3	0
Bristol Rovers	Total		19	0	0	0	0	0	4	0	23	0
Career total			142	12	11	0	1	0	31	4	185	16

== Honours ==
Peterborough United

- EFL Trophy: 2023–24, 2024–25
