= Yahya Bamba =

French footballer (born 1999)

Personal information
- Date of birth: 27 April 1999 (age 27)
- Positions: Winger; forward

Team information
- Current team: Newport County
- Number: 20

Senior career*
Years	Team	Apps	(Gls)
- Phoenix Sports
2021–2024	Sevenoaks Town		
2022–2024	Cray Wanderers		
2024–2025	Eastbourne Borough	49	(12)
2025–2026	Forest Green Rovers	14	(1)
2026	→ Brackley Town (loan)	2	(0)
2026–	Newport County	15	(2)
- * Club domestic league appearances and goals as of 13:30, 22 November 2026 (UTC)

Yahya Bamba (born 27 April 1999) is a French professional footballer who plays as a winger and forward for EFL League Two club Newport County.

== Career ==
Bamba spent his early career with Phoenix Sports, Sevenoaks Town and Cray Wanderers. He was injured whilst playing for Cray Wanderers, resulting in the match being abandoned.

After joining Eastbourne Borough in March 2024, for whom he scored on his debut, Bamba signed for Forest Green Rovers in June 2025. He moved on loan to Brackley Town in January 2026 for the remainder of the 2025–26 season.

Bamba signed for EFL League Two club Newport County in June 2026. On 8 August 2026 he scored on his Newport debut in the EFL Cup 1–1 draw against AFC Wimbledon in normal time, which Newport lost 5–4 on penalties. He was praised by manager Hayden Mullins. Bamba later said that he was enjoying playing under Mullins. Bamba made his Football League debut on 15 August 2026, scoring the third goal in Newport's 3–0 League Two win against Rochdale on the opening day of the 2026–27 season.

== Career statistics ==
As of match played 21 November 2026

Appearances and goals by club, season and competition
Club	Season	League			FA Cup		League Cup		Other		Total	
Club	Season	Division	Apps	Goals	Apps	Goals	Apps	Goals	Apps	Goals	Apps	Goals
Newport County	2026–27	League Two	15	2	1	0	1	1	3 (Note: Appearances in EFL Trophy)	1	20	4
Career total			15	2	1	0	1	1	3	1	20	4
