= Keenan Gough =

English footballer (born 2006)

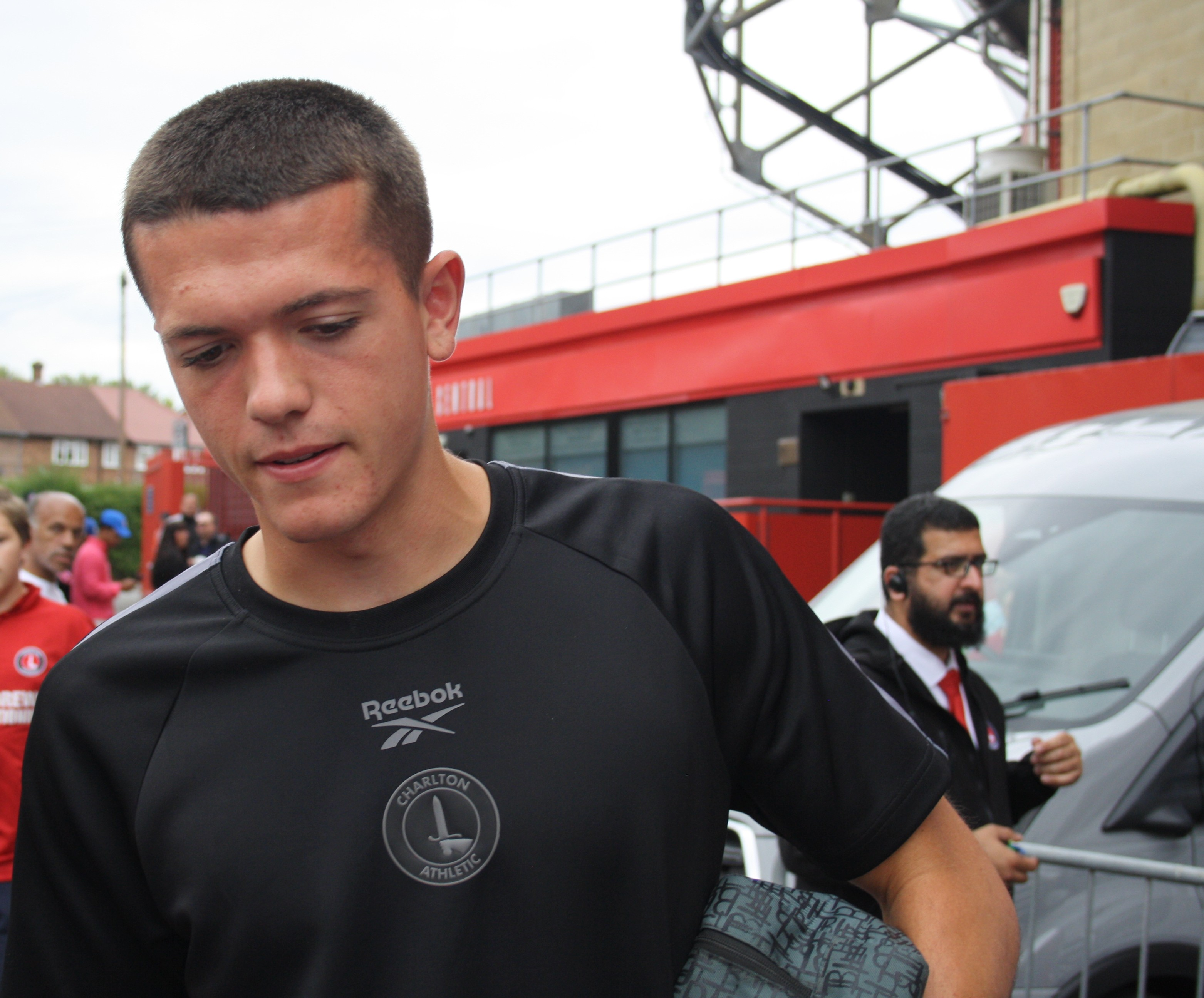
- Gough with Charlton Athletic in 2025.

Personal information
- Full name: Keenan Blue Gough
- Date of birth: 28 February 2006 (age 20)
- Place of birth: Kent, England
- Position: Centre-back

Team information
- Current team: Bristol Rovers (on loan from Charlton Athletic)
- Number: 22

Youth career
- 2014–: Charlton Athletic

Senior career*
Years	Team	Apps	(Gls)
2025–	Charlton Athletic	3	(0)
2026–	→ Bristol Rovers (loan)	9	(0)
- * Club domestic league appearances and goals as of 17:10, 14 November 2026 (UTC)

Keenan Blue Gough (born 28 February 2006) is an English professional footballer who plays as a centre-back for EFL League Two club Bristol Rovers, on loan from EFL Championship club Charlton Athletic.

== Career ==
=== Charlton Athletic ===
Coming through the youth system of Charlton Athletic, having joined the club at U9 level, Gough signed his first professional deal with the club on 2 June 2023.

Gough made his professional debut for the club as a 19–year–old, coming on for the final 15 minutes of a 3–1 EFL Cup defeat away at Cambridge United on 26 August 2025.

On 12 November 2025, Gough signed a new long-term contract with Charlton Athletic.

On 20 December 2025, Gough made his first Championship appearance for the club, coming on in 89th minute of a 1–0 home victory over Oxford United on 26 August 2025.

==== Bristol Rovers (loan) ====
On 7 August 2026, Gough joined League Two club Bristol Rovers on a season-long loan deal. Having started and impressed in the club's opening two league fixtures, his performances drew praise from manager Steve Evans who described Gough as a "young man who will play a lot of Championship football going forward".

== Career statistics ==
As of match played 14 November 2026

Appearances and goals by club, season and competition
Club	Season	League			FA Cup		EFL Cup		Other		Total	
Club	Season	Division	Apps	Goals	Apps	Goals	Apps	Goals	Apps	Goals	Apps	Goals
Charlton Athletic	2025–26	Championship	3	0	1	0	1	0	—		5	0
Charlton Athletic	2026–27	Championship	0	0	0	0	0	0	—		0	0
Charlton Athletic	Charlton Athletic total		3	0	1	0	1	0	0	0	5	0
Bristol Rovers (loan)	2026–27	League Two	9	0	1	0	1	0	1 (Note: Appearance(s) in EFL Trophy)	0	12	0
Career total			12	0	2	0	2	0	1	0	17	0
