= Tommy Leigh (footballer, born 2000) =

English footballer

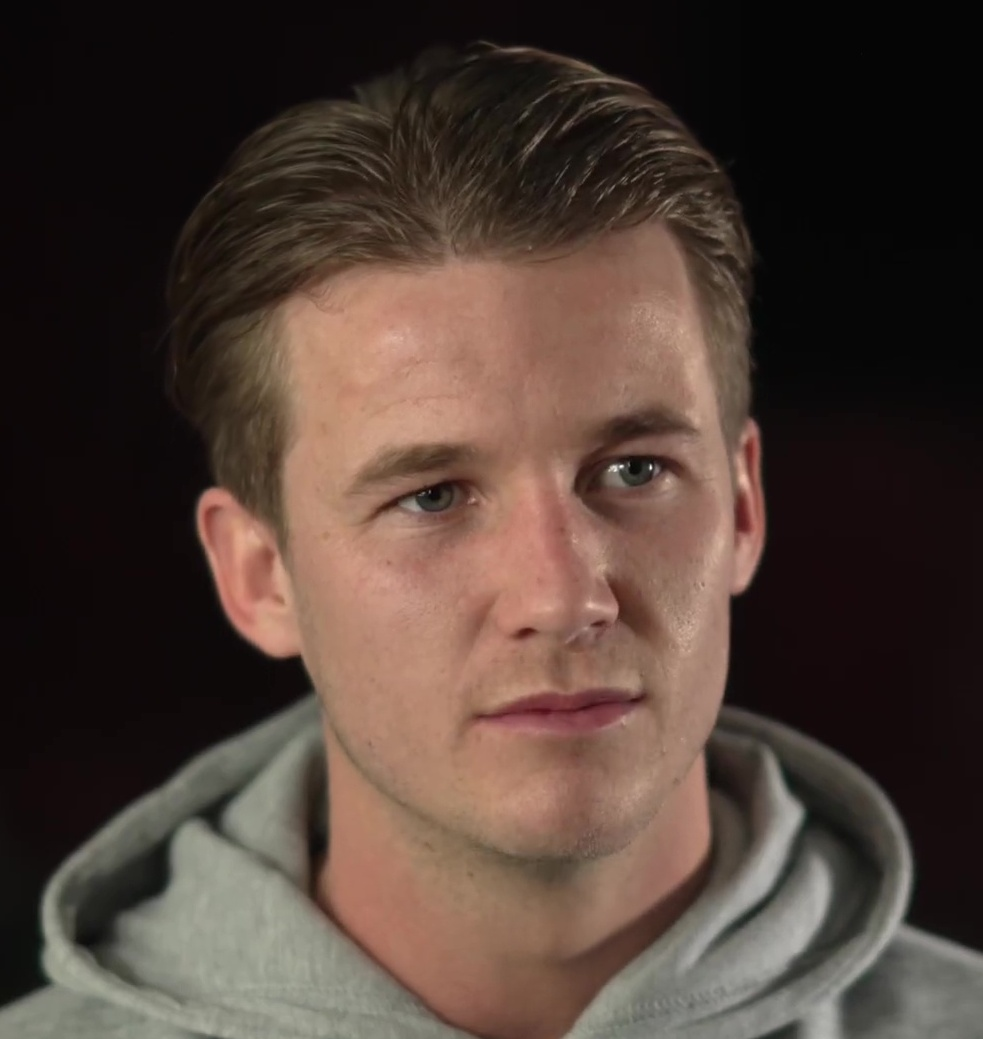
- Leigh in 2025

Personal information
- Full name: Tommy Leigh
- Date of birth: 13 April 2000 (age 26)
- Place of birth: Portsmouth, England
- Height: 1.85 m (6 ft 1 in)
- Position: Midfielder

Team information
- Current team: Bristol Rovers (on loan from Bradford City)
- Number: 24

Youth career
- Portsmouth

Senior career*
| Years | Team | Apps | (Gls) |
| 2017 | Horndean | 2 | (0) |
| 2017–2019 | Baffins Milton Rovers | 43 | (4) |
| 2019–2021 | Bognor Regis Town | 39 | (10) |
| 2021–2024 | Accrington Stanley | 121 | (28) |
| 2024–2025 | Milton Keynes Dons | 17 | (1) |
| 2025– | Bradford City | 32 | (1) |
| 2026 | → Bristol Rovers (loan) | 14 | (4) |
| 2026– | → Bristol Rovers (loan) | 5 | (2) |
- * Club domestic league appearances and goals as of 17:12, 5 September 2026 (UTC)

Tommy Leigh (born 13 April 2000) is an English professional footballer who plays for EFL League Two club Bristol Rovers on loan from EFL League One club Bradford City.

== Career ==
Leigh came through the youth ranks at Portsmouth before being released at the age of 16.

After a brief spell at Horndean, Leigh joined Baffins Milton Rovers, where his father (Steve) was manager and his brother (Ashton) also played. In his first season with the side, Leigh made 14 appearances, scoring on one occasion. The following season, Leigh was one of a trio of players who scored a hat-trick in a 14–1 FA Vase victory over New College Swindon.

In 2019, Leigh joined Bognor Regis Town, where his brother Ashton had moved to the previous year.

In July 2021, Leigh joined League One side Accrington Stanley for an undisclosed fee. Leigh made his Football League debut on 14 August 2021, coming off the bench against Cambridge United.

On 18 June 2024, Leigh joined Milton Keynes Dons for an undisclosed fee. He made his debut for the club on 10 August 2024 as a 70th-minute substitute in a 2–1 home defeat to Bradford City. On 1 October 2024, Leigh scored his first goal for the club in a 5–1 away win over Harrogate Town.

=== Bradford City ===
On 10 January 2025, Leigh signed for League Two club Bradford City on a two-and-a-half year deal for an undisclosed fee. On 3 May 2025, he was brought on as a substitute at half-time as the Bantams defeated Fleetwood Town 1–0 with an Antoni Sarcevic goal in the 96th minute to win promotion to League One.

==== Bristol Rovers (loan) ====
On 2 February 2026, Leigh returned to League Two, joining Bristol Rovers on loan for the remainder of the 2025–26 season. On 7 March, he scored his first goals for the club, scoring in the 87th and 92nd minute as the Gas came from behind to beat Crewe Alexandra. Having scored a total of four goals across the month, he was voted the club's Player of the Month for March.

On 17 June 2026, Leigh returned to Bristol Rovers on loan for the 2026–27 season.

== Career statistics ==
As of match played 5 September 2026

Appearances and goals by club, season and competition
| Club | Season | League | | | FA Cup | | League Cup | | Other | | Total | |
| Club | Season | Division | Apps | Goals | Apps | Goals | Apps | Goals | Apps | Goals | Apps | Goals |
|---|---|---|---|---|---|---|---|---|---|---|---|---|
| Horndean | 2017–18 | Wessex League Premier Division | 2 | 0 | 0 | 0 | — | | 5 (Note: One appearance in FA Vase, two appearances two goals in Wessex League Cup, two appearances one goal in Hampshire Senior Cup) | 3 | 7 | 3 |
| Baffins Milton Rovers | 2017–18 | Wessex League Premier Division | 14 | 1 | — | | — | | 0 | 0 | 14 | 1 |
| Baffins Milton Rovers | 2018–19 | Wessex League Premier Division | 29 | 3 | 2 | 1 | — | | 13 (Note: Four appearances four goals in FA Vase, five appearances one goal in Wessex League Cup, one appearance in Hampshire Senior Cup, three appearances one goal in Portsmouth Senior Cup) | 6 | 44 | 10 |
| Baffins Milton Rovers | Total | | 43 | 4 | 2 | 1 | — | | 13 | 6 | 58 | 11 |
| Bognor Regis Town | 2019–20 | Isthmian League Premier Division | 32 | 8 | 2 | 0 | — | | 6 (Note: Two appearances in FA Trophy, one appearance in Isthmian League Cup, three appearances in Sussex Senior Cup) | 0 | 40 | 8 |
| Bognor Regis Town | 2020–21 | Isthmian League Premier Division | 7 | 2 | 2 | 0 | — | | 4 (Note: Three appearances in FA Trophy, one appearance in Sussex Senior Cup) | 0 | 13 | 2 |
| Bognor Regis Town | Total | | 39 | 10 | 4 | 0 | — | | 10 | 0 | 53 | 10 |
| Accrington Stanley | 2021–22 | League One | 24 | 6 | 0 | 0 | 1 | 0 | 3 (Note: Appearances in the EFL Trophy) | 2 | 28 | 8 |
| Accrington Stanley | 2022–23 | League One | 39 | 7 | 5 | 1 | 1 | 0 | 5 | 4 | 50 | 12 |
| Accrington Stanley | 2023–24 | League Two | 39 | 8 | 2 | 0 | 1 | 0 | 0 | 0 | 42 | 8 |
| Accrington Stanley | Total | | 102 | 21 | 7 | 1 | 3 | 0 | 8 | 6 | 120 | 28 |
| Milton Keynes Dons | 2024–25 | League Two | 12 | 1 | 1 | 0 | 1 | 0 | 3 | 0 | 17 | 1 |
| Bradford City | 2024–25 | League Two | 16 | 0 | 0 | 0 | 0 | 0 | 0 | 0 | 16 | 0 |
| Bradford City | 2025–26 | League One | 16 | 1 | 1 | 0 | 3 | 0 | 3 | 0 | 23 | 1 |
| Bradford City | Total | | 32 | 1 | 1 | 0 | 3 | 0 | 3 | 0 | 39 | 1 |
| Bristol Rovers (loan) | 2025–26 | League Two | 14 | 4 | 0 | 0 | 0 | 0 | 0 | 0 | 14 | 4 |
| Bristol Rovers (loan) | 2026–27 | League Two | 5 | 2 | 0 | 0 | 1 | 0 | 0 | 0 | 6 | 2 |
| Bristol Rovers (loan) | Total | | 19 | 6 | 0 | 0 | 1 | 0 | 0 | 0 | 20 | 6 |
| Career total | | | 249 | 43 | 15 | 2 | 8 | 0 | 42 | 15 | 314 | 60 |

== Honours ==
Baffins Milton Rovers

- Wessex League Cup: 2018–19

Bradford City

- League Two third-place promotion: 2024–25

Individual

- Accrington Stanley Player of the Season: 2022–23
