= Michael Spellman (footballer) =

English footballer (born 2002)

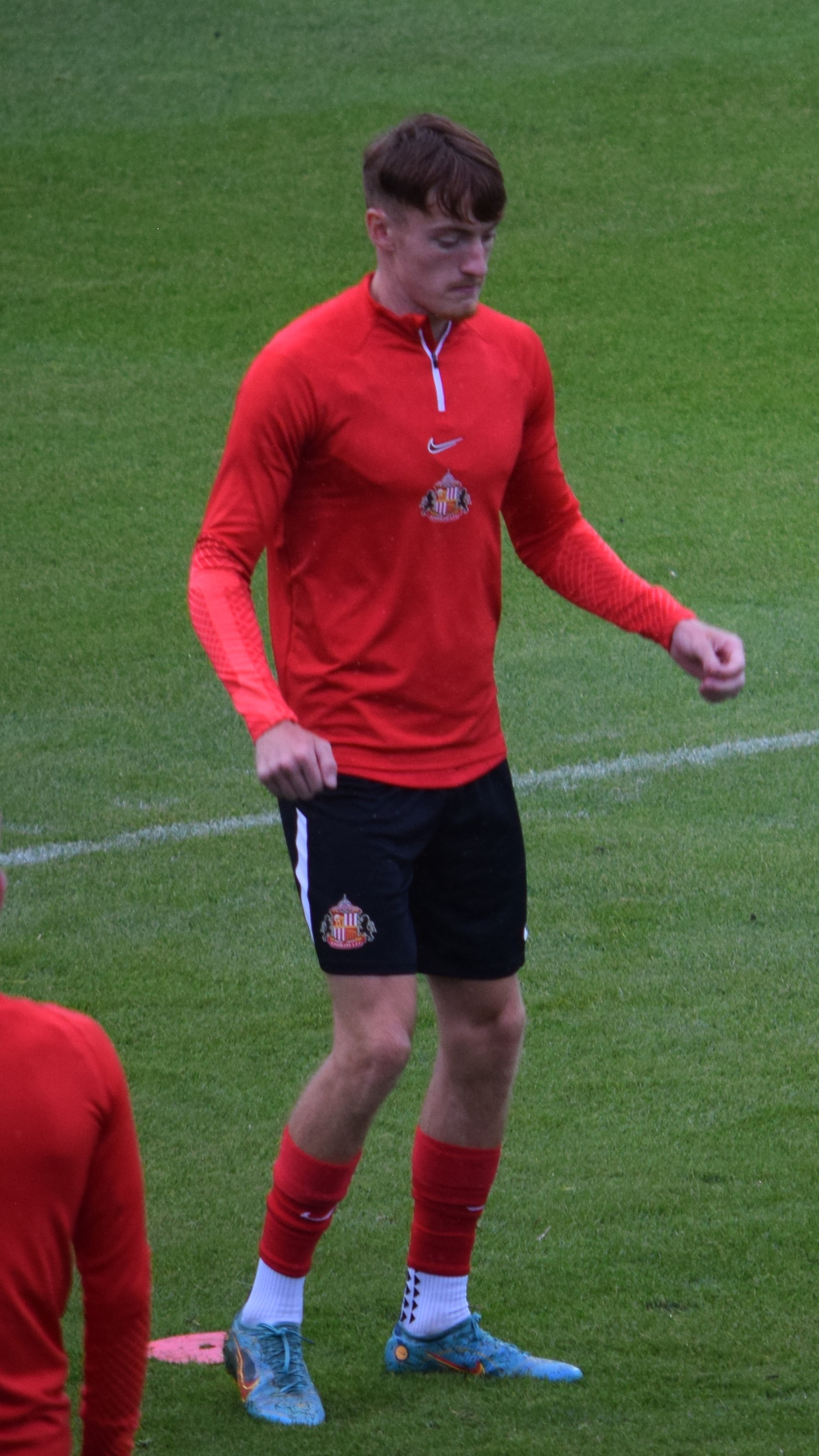
- Spellman warming up for Sunderland in 2022

Personal information
- Full name: Michael Dean Emery Spellman
- Date of birth: 21 September 2002 (age 24)
- Height: 1.85 m (6 ft 1 in)
- Position: Winger

Team information
- Current team: Gateshead

Youth career
- Park View Academy

Senior career*
Years	Team	Apps	(Gls)
2021–2022	Chester-le-Street United	16	(14)
2022–2024	Sunderland	0	(0)
2022	→ Whitby Town (loan)	3	(1)
2023	→ Blyth Spartans (loan)	16	(1)
2024–2026	Newport County	66	(7)
2026–	Gateshead	0	(0)
- * Club domestic league appearances and goals as of 11:50, 14 August 2026 (UTC)

Michael Spellman (born 21 September 2002) is an English professional footballer who plays as a winger for National League club Gateshead.

== Club career ==
Spellman started his career with the Park View Academy. Having scored 19 goals in 23 appearances in all competitions, including 14 in 16 in the Wearside League for Chester-le-Street United, he went on trial with Scottish side Livingston in July 2021. However nothing materialised from the trial.

=== Sunderland ===
He went on trial with EFL Championship side Sunderland in March 2022. He spent the second half of the 2021–22 season on a non-contract agreement with Sunderland, signing permanently in June 2022.

In September 2022, he joined Northern Premier League side Whitby Town on a one-month loan deal. After four games in all competitions, in which he scored once, he returned to Sunderland at the end of the loan spell.

In February 2023, he joined National League North club Blyth Spartans on loan for the remainder of the season.

Following the conclusion of the 2023–24 season, Spellman was announced to be leaving Sunderland upon the expiration of his contract.

=== Newport County ===
On 2 July 2024, Spellman joined League Two side Newport County on a two-year contract. He made his Newport debut on 28 September 2024 as a second-half substitute in the 2-1 League Two win against Crewe Alexandra. Spellman scored his first goal for Newport on 2 October 2024 in the 3-1 League Two win against Salford City. Spellman was offered a new contract by Newport at the end of the 2025–26 season but he chose to move on.

=== Gateshead ===
On 13 August 2026, Spellman joined National League club Gateshead on an initial one-year deal, with the option for a further year.

== Career statistics ==
As of end of 2025–26 season

Appearances and goals by club, season and competition
Club	Season	League			FA Cup		EFL Cup		Other		Total	
Club	Season	Division	Apps	Goals	Apps	Goals	Apps	Goals	Apps	Goals	Apps	Goals
Chester-le-Street United	2021–22	Wearside League	16	14	0	0	–		7	5	23	19
Sunderland	2022–23	Championship	0	0	0	0	1	0	0	0	1	0
Sunderland	2023–24	Championship	0	0	0	0	0	0	0	0	0	0
Sunderland	Total		0	0	0	0	1	0	0	0	1	0
Whitby Town (loan)	2022–23	NPL Premier Division	3	1	0	0	–		1 (Note: Appearance(s) in FA Trophy)	0	4	1
Blyth Spartans (loan)	2022–23	National League North	16	1	—		—		0	0	16	1
Newport County	2024–25	League Two	31	2	0	0	0	0	1 (Note: Appearance(s) in EFL Trophy)	0	32	2
Newport County	2025–26	League Two	35	5	1	0	1	0	3	0	40	5
Newport County	Total		66	7	1	0	1	0	4	0	72	7
Career total			101	23	1	0	2	0	12	5	116	28
