= Ben Lloyd (footballer) =

Welsh footballer (born 2005)

Personal information
- Full name: Ben Nicholas Lloyd
- Date of birth: 14 March 2005 (age 21)
- Place of birth: Swansea, Wales
- Height: 1.75 m (5 ft 9 in)
- Position: Attacking midfielder

Team information
- Current team: Swansea City
- Number: 36

Youth career
- –2022: Swansea City

Senior career*
Years	Team	Apps	(Gls)
2022–	Swansea City	2	(0)
2025–2026	→ Newport County (loan)	36	(3)

International career^{‡}
2021	Wales U16	1	(0)
2021–2022	Wales U17	6	(0)
2021–2022	Wales U18	2	(0)
2022–2023	Wales U19	9	(2)
2024–	Wales U21	4	(0)
- * Club domestic league appearances and goals as of 16:47, 2 May 2026 (UTC) ‡ National team caps and goals as of 21:26, 15 November 2025 (UTC)

Ben Nicholas Lloyd (born 14 March 2005) is a Welsh professional footballer who plays as an attacking midfielder for EFL Championship club Swansea City. He is a Wales under-21 international.

== Career ==
Lloyd is a product of the Swansea City academy, having joined at the age of 12. Having featured at the under-18, under-21 and under-23 levels regularly and notably scored 20 seconds after having come off the bench against Forest Green Rovers in a 2021 friendly, he was included in a first-team matchday squad for the first time in a 3-0 win over Reading in the first round of the EFL Cup in August 2021. He remained an unused substitute. He signed his first professional contract in June 2022. Lloyd would sign an extension on 20 April 2023, which is due to last until June 2026.

Lloyd made his professional debut on Boxing Day 2024, coming on as a late substitute in a 3-0 win over Queens Park Rangers. He would make a second appearance in the 2024-25 season, coming on as a late substitute in a 3-3 draw against Oxford United on the final matchday of the EFL Championship season.

On 28 July 2025, Lloyd joined League Two side Newport County on loan until January 2026. He made his debut for Newport in the EFL Cup preliminary round win against Barnet on 29 July 2025. Lloyd scored his first Newport goal on 23 September 2025 in the 2-1 EFL Trophy defeat to Arsenal under-21's. His loan was extended by Newport to the end of the 2025-26 season. Lloyd was selected as Newport County Young Player of the Year for the 2025-26 season.

== International career ==
Lloyd has represented Wales at an under-16, under-17, under-18, under-19, and under-21 international level.

== Career statistics ==
As of match played 2 May 2026

Appearances and goals by club, season and competition
Club	Season	League			FA Cup		League Cup		Other		Total	
Club	Season	Division	Apps	Goals	Apps	Goals	Apps	Goals	Apps	Goals	Apps	Goals
Swansea City	2024–25	Championship	2	0	0	0	0	0	0	0	2	0
Swansea City	2025–26	Championship	0	0	0	0	0	0	0	0	0	0
Swansea City	Total		2	0	0	0	0	0	0	0	2	0
Newport County (loan)	2025–26	League Two	36	2	0	0	2	0	1 (Note: Appearance(s) in EFL Trophy)	1	39	3
Career total			38	2	0	0	2	0	1	1	41	3
