= Cole Jarvis =

Welsh footballer (born 2001)

Personal information
- Full name: Cole Lewis Jarvis
- Date of birth: 15 July 2001 (age 25)
- Place of birth: Cardiff, Wales
- Position: Midfielder

Team information
- Current team: Merthyr Town (on loan from Newport County)

Youth career
- Merthyr Town

Senior career*
Years	Team	Apps	(Gls)
2017–2018	Merthyr Town		
20??–2021	Risca United		
2021–2022	Llanrumney United		
2022–2023	Cardiff Corinthians		
2023–2024	Newport City		
2024–2026	Merthyr Town	72	(16)
2026–	Newport County	13	(1)
2026-	→ Merthyr Town (loan)	0	(0)
- * Club domestic league appearances and goals as of 11:15, 10 October 2026 (UTC)

Cole Lewis Jarvis (born 15 July 2001) is a Welsh professional footballer who plays as a midfielder for National League North club Merthyr Town on loan from EFL League Two club Newport County.

== Career ==
Jarvis began his career at Merthyr Town, coming through their academy and making first-team appearances in the 2017–18 season, before leaving and playing for Welsh league system clubs Risca United, Cardiff Corinthians, Llanrumney United and Newport City, before returning to Merthyr in June 2024.

On 3 February 2026, Jarvis signed for EFL League Two club Newport County. He made his Newport debut on 7 February 2026 in the EFL League Two 0–0 draw against Grimsby Town. Jarvis scored his first Newport goal on 22 August 2026 in the 5-3 League Two defeat to Bristol Rovers.

On 9 October 2026 Jarvis re-joined Merthyr Town on loan until January 2026.

== Career statistics ==
As of 6 October 2026

Appearances and goals by club, season and competition
Club	Season	League			FA Cup		League cup (Note: Includes Welsh League Cup, EFL Cup)		Other		Total	
Club	Season	Division	Apps	Goals	Apps	Goals	Apps	Goals	Apps	Goals	Apps	Goals
Merthyr Town	2024–25	SL Premier Division South	42	9	2	1	2	0	1 (Note: Appearance in FA Trophy)	0	47	10
Merthyr Town	2025–26	National League North	30	7	2	0	—		1	0	33	7
Merthyr Town	Total		72	16	4	1	2	0	2	0	80	17
Newport County	2025–26	League Two	11	0	—		—		0	0	11	0
Newport County	2026–27	League Two	2	1	0	0	0	0	2	0	4	1
Newport County	Total		13	1	0	0	0	0	2	0	15	1
Career total			85	17	4		2	0	4	0	95	18
