= Shaquille Gwengwe =

Malawian footballer

- Gwengwe playing for Newport County in 2026

Personal information
- Full name: Shaquille Nixon Gwengwe
- Date of birth: 29 March 2001 (age 25)
- Place of birth: Lilongwe, Malawi
- Position: Striker

Team information
- Current team: Newport County
- Number: 9

Senior career*
Years	Team	Apps	(Gls)
2018–2019	Andover Town	29	(22)
2019–2020	Blackfield & Langley	22	(0)
2020–2021	Worthing	8	(0)
2021–2022	Totton	20	(7)
2022–2025	Dorchester Town	106	(39)
2025–2026	Poole Town	41	(42)
2026–	Newport County	11	(5)

International career^{‡}
2026	Malawi	0	(0)
- * Club domestic league appearances and goals as of 20:26, 14 November 2026 (UTC) ‡ National team caps and goals as of 16:45, 16 September 2026 (UTC)

Shaquille Nixon Gwengwe (born 29 March 2001) is a Malawian professional footballer who plays as a striker for EFL League Two club Newport County and the Malawi national team.

== Early and personal life ==
Gwengwe was born in Lilongwe. After moving to England, he attended Portsmouth College.

== Career ==
Having started his career with Wessex League club Andover Town, he joined Southern League Premier Division South club Blackfield & Langley for the 2019–20 season. Following the club's decision to resign to the Wessex League, he remained at step 3, joining Isthmian League Premier Division club Worthing in September 2020. He joined AFC Totton in September 2021.

In June 2022, following a strong season with AFC Totton, Gwengwe returned to the Southern League Premier Division South, joining Dorchester Town.

In June 2025, Gwengwe joined Southern League Premier Division South club and Dorchester Town rival Poole Town. During his first season with the club, he scored a total of 46 goals in 46 matches, winning The Non-League Paper's National Game Awards Golden Boot. He left the Dolphins on a free after his contract expired, leaving as a legend of the club.

=== Newport County ===
On 18 June 2026, Gwengwe signed for League Two club Newport County. Having made his competitive debut in an EFL Trophy penalty-shootout defeat to AFC Wimbledon, he made his English Football League debut on the opening day of the 2026–27 league season, scoring his side's second goal in a 3–0 victory over newly promoted Rochdale. Having started the season playing as a left-winger as opposed to in his more natural centre-forward position, his fast start to his professional career continued with a total of four goals in his first four league appearances. He earned his first Malawi call-up while playing for Newport County. However he was forced to pull out and not join up with The Flames at the last minute. He requested consideration for the next squad.

== International career ==
In February 2023 Gwengwe expessed interest in representing the Malawi national football team. He stated, "It would be a pleasure to represent my mother's country and make her proud. To the football authorities in Malawi, I am ready, come and get me". While playing for Newport County, Gwengwe was called up to the Malawi national team squad for the first time.

He received his first call-up to the Malawi national team on September 16th 2026. However, withdrew from the Malawi squad and requested consideration for the next squad.

== Career statistics ==
As of match played 14 November 2026

Appearances and goals by club, season and competition
Club	Season	League			FA Cup		League Cup		Other		Total	
Club	Season	Division	Apps	Goals	Apps	Goals	Apps	Goals	Apps	Goals	Apps	Goals
Andover Town	2018–19	Wessex League Division One	29	22	0	0	—		6 (Note: One appearance in Wessex League Cup, one appearance and one goal in FA Vase, one appearance in Russell Cotes Benevolent Cup, one appearance in North Hants Senior Cup, two appearances and one goal in Andover Open Cup)	2	35	24
Blackfield & Langley	2019–20	Southern League Premier Division South	22	0	3	2	—		9 (Note: One appearance in Hampshire Senior Cup, two appearances in Southern Football League Cup, two appearances and one goal in FA Trophy, four appearances and two goals in Southampton Senior Cup)	3	34	5
Worthing	2020–21	Isthmian League Premier Division	4	0	1	0	—		1 (Note: Appearance(s) in FA Trophy)	0	6	0
Worthing	2021–22	Isthmian League Premier Division	4	0	1	0	—		0	0	5	0
Worthing	Total		8	0	2	0	0	0	1	0	11	0
AFC Totton	2021–22	Southern League Division One South	20	7	0	0	—		9 (Note: Two appearances in FA Trophy, one appearance in Southern Football League Cup, two appearance in Hampshire Senior Cup, four appearances and eight goals in Southampton Senior Cup)	8	29	15
Dorchester Town	2022–23	Southern League Premier Division South	31	13	3	0	—		2 (Note: Appearance(s) in Dorset Senior Cup)	0	36	13
Dorchester Town	2023–24	Southern League Premier Division South	40	17	1	0	—		2 (Note: One appearance in FA Trophy, one appearance in Dorset Senior Cup)	0	43	17
Dorchester Town	2024–25	Southern League Premier Division South	35	9	1	0	—		4 (Note: Two appearances in FA Trophy, one appearance and one goal in Dorset Senior Cup, one appearance in Southern League Premier Division South play-offs)	1	40	10
Dorchester Town	Total		106	39	5	0	0	0	8	1	119	40
Poole Town	2025–26	Southern League Premier Division South	41	42	4	3	—		1 (Note: Appearance(s) in Southern League Premier Division South play-offs)	1	46	46
Newport County	2026–27	League Two	11	5	1	0	1	0	2	0	15	5
Career total			237	115	15	5	1	0	36	15	289	135
