= Bobby Kamwa =

Cameroonian footballer

Personal information
- Full name: Bobby-Emmanuel Kamwa
- Date of birth: 18 March 2000 (age 26)
- Place of birth: Douala, Cameroon
- Height: 1.83 m (6 ft 0 in)
- Position: Winger

Team information
- Current team: Bristol Rovers
- Number: 10

Youth career
- 2014–2021: Leeds United

Senior career*
Years	Team	Apps	(Gls)
2021–2022	Leeds United	0	(0)
2022	→ Dunfermline Athletic (loan)	7	(0)
2022–2024	Burton Albion	42	(4)
2024–2026	Newport County	83	(14)
2026–	Bristol Rovers	12	(3)
- * Club domestic league appearances and goals as of 19:24, 7 November 2026 (UTC)

Bobby-Emmanuel Kamwa (born 18 March 2000) is a Cameroonian professional footballer who plays as a winger for EFL League Two club Bristol Rovers.

== Club career ==
=== Leeds United ===
Kamwa was born in Douala, Cameroon, but moved with his family to Leeds, England, at the age of nine. Kamwa joined the Leeds United academy aged 13 and in July 2020, he signed a two-year contract with the club. Kamwa was released by Leeds at the end of the 2021–22 season.

==== Dunfermline Athletic (loan) ====
In January 2022 Kamwa joined Scottish Championship club Dunfermline Athletic on loan for the remainder of the 2021–22 season.

=== Burton Albion ===
He signed for League One club Burton Albion in October 2022, before signing a new contract in February 2023 to keep him at the club until June 2024.

Following the conclusion of the 2023–24 season, it was confirmed Kamwa was to leave the club upon the expiration of his contract.

=== Newport County ===
On 2 August 2024, Kamwa joined EFL League Two club Newport County. He made his debut for Newport on 10 August 2024 in the 3-2 EFL League Two defeat to Cheltenham Town. Kamwa scored his first goal for Newport on 17 August 2024 in the 3-1 League Two win against Doncaster Rovers. On 21 December 2024, he scored a first career hat-trick in the 6–3 League Two win against Milton Keynes Dons.

On the final day of the 2025–26 season, Kamwa scored an 83rd minute winner to help Newport defeat Barrow 2–1, securing the club's survival at the expense of their opponents. Following the conclusion of the season, he rejected the offer of an improved contract, instead choosing to depart the club.

=== Bristol Rovers ===
On 26 June 2026, Kamwa agreed to join League Two club Bristol Rovers on a two-year deal, effective from 1 July. Having agreed to join the Gas following a four-hour meeting with new manager Steve Evans, he had reportedly met with a total of six EFL clubs prior to making his final decision, which he described as a 'no-brainer'.

On 22 August 2026, he scored his first goal for the club, on his first start, with his side's fourth in a 5–3 victory over Kamwa's former club Newport County. Having been subject to abuse and boos from his former club's fans, he celebrated his goal by running the length of the pitch to celebrate in front of them.

== Career statistics ==
As of match played 29 August 2026

Appearances and goals by club, season and competition
Club	Season	League			National cup		League cup		Other		Total	
Club	Season	Division	Apps	Goals	Apps	Goals	Apps	Goals	Apps	Goals	Apps	Goals
Leeds United	2021–22	Premier League	0	0	0	0	0	0	—		0	0
Dunfermline Athletic (loan)	2021–22	Scottish Championship	7	0	—		—		1 (Note: Appearance(s) in Scottish Championship play-offs)	0	8	0
Burton Albion	2022–23	League One	17	2	2	1	0	0	2 (Note: Appearance(s) in EFL Trophy)	0	21	3
Burton Albion	2023–24	League One`	25	2	0	0	1	0	0	0	26	2
Burton Albion	Total		42	4	2	1	1	0	2	0	47	5
Newport County	2024–25	League Two	43	9	1	0	1	0	3	0	48	9
Newport County	2025–26	League Two	40	5	2	0	2	0	3	0	47	5
Newport County	Total		83	14	3	0	3	0	6	0	95	14
Bristol Rovers	2026–27	League Two	3	2	0	0	1	0	0	0	4	2
Career total			135	20	5	1	5	0	9	0	154	21
