= Lee Jenkins (footballer, born 2001) =

Welsh footballer

- Jenkins playing for Newport County in September 2026

Personal information
- Full name: Lee Thomas Jenkins
- Date of birth: 30 August 2001 (age 25)
- Place of birth: Aberaeron, Wales
- Height: 1.76 m (5 ft 9 in)
- Position: Defender

Team information
- Current team: Newport County
- Number: 5

Senior career*
Years	Team	Apps	(Gls)
2017–2022	Aberystwyth Town	93	(6)
2022–2025	Haverfordwest County	94	(5)
2025–	Newport County	51	(1)

International career
2023–2024	Wales C	2	(0)
- * Club domestic league appearances and goals as of 14:48, 21 November 2026 (UTC)

Lee Thomas Jenkins (born 30 August 2001) is a Welsh footballer who plays as a defender for EFL League Two club Newport County.

== Career ==
Jenkins began his career with Aberystwyth Town in the Cymru Premier League before joining Haverfordwest County. On 23 June 2025 Jenkins joined EFL League Two Newport County. He made his debut for Newport in the EFL Cup preliminary round win against Barnet on 29 July 2025. Jenkins scored his first Newport goal in the EFL League Two 2-1 defeat to Colchester United on 7 March 2026. Jenkins was selected as Newport County Player of the Year for the 2025-26 season.
