= 2023–24 Gillingham F.C. season =

English football club season

Gillingham
2023–24 season
- Owner: Brad Galinson
- Chairman: Brad Galinson
- Head Coach: Neil Harris (until 5 October); Keith Millen (interim); Stephen Clemence (from 1 November)
- Stadium: Priestfield Stadium
- League Two: 12th
- FA Cup: Third round
- EFL Cup: Second round
- EFL Trophy: Group stage
- Top goalscorer: League: Connor Mahoney (7); All: Connor Mahoney (7)
Home colours

The 2023–24 season was the 131st season in the history of Gillingham and their second consecutive season in League Two. The club participated in League Two, the FA Cup, the EFL Cup, and the 2023–24 EFL Trophy.

== Current squad ==
As of 23 March 2024

No.	Name	Position	Nationality	Place of birth	Date of birth (age)	Signed from	Date signed	Fee	Contract end
Goalkeepers
1	Glenn Morris	GK	(England)	Woolwich	20 December 1983 (age 42)	Crawley Town	12 January 2023	Free Transfer	30 June 2024
25	Jake Turner	GK	(England)	Wilmslow	25 February 1999 (age 27)	Newcastle United	1 July 2022	Free Transfer	30 June 2025
33	Taite Holtam	GK	(England)			Academy	1 July 2023	Trainee	30 June 2024
Defenders
3	Max Clark	LB	(England)	Kingston upon Hull	19 January 1996 (age 30)	Stevenage	1 July 2023	Free Transfer	30 June 2025
4	Conor Masterson	CB	(Republic of Ireland)	Celbridge	8 September 1998 (age 28)	Queens Park Rangers	1 July 2023	Free Transfer	30 June 2024
5	Max Ehmer	CB	(Germany)	Frankfurt	3 February 1992 (age 34)	Bristol Rovers	1 July 2021	Free Transfer	30 June 2024
13	Scott Malone	LB	(England)	Rowley Regis	25 March 1991 (age 35)	Millwall	24 July 2023	Free Transfer	30 June 2024
14	Robbie McKenzie	RB	(England)	Kingston upon Hull	25 September 1998 (age 28)	Hull City	21 August 2020	Free Transfer	30 June 2024
22	Shadrach Ogie	CB	(Republic of Ireland)	Limerick	25 August 2001 (age 25)	Leyton Orient	18 July 2023	Undisclosed	30 June 2025
24	Remeao Hutton	RB	(Burundi)	(England) Walsall	28 September 1998 (age 28)	Swindon Town	17 January 2024	Undisclosed	30 June 2025
35	Alex Giles	CB	(England)		29 January 2005 (age 21)	Academy	1 July 2023	Trainee	30 June 2024
Midfielders
6	Shaun Williams	DM	(Republic of Ireland)	Portmarnock	19 October 1986 (age 40)	Portsmouth	1 July 2022	Free Transfer	30 June 2024
7	George Lapslie	CM	(England)	Waltham Forest	5 September 1997 (age 29)	Mansfield Town	14 January 2023	Undisclosed	30 June 2024
8	Jonny Williams	AM	(Wales)	Pembury	9 October 1993 (age 33)	Swindon Town	1 July 2023	Free Transfer	30 June 2024
11	Dom Jefferies	CM	(Wales)		22 May 2002 (age 24)	Brentford	1 July 2022	Free Transfer	30 June 2024
17	Jayden Clarke	CM	(England)	London	8 May 2001 (age 25)	Dulwich Hamlet	19 January 2023	Undisclosed	30 June 2024
18	Ethan Coleman	DM	(England)	Reading	28 January 2000 (age 26)	Leyton Orient	19 January 2023	Undisclosed	30 June 2024
38	Timothée Dieng	DM	(France)	Grenoble	9 April 1992 (age 34)	Exeter City	11 January 2023	Undisclosed	30 June 2024
41	Stanley Skipper	MF	(England)		29 September 2005 (age 21)	Arsenal	1 July 2022	Trainee	30 June 2024
Forwards
9	Josh Andrews	CF	(England)	Solihull	16 October 2001 (age 25)	Birmingham City	1 February 2024	Undisclosed	30 June 2025
10	Ashley Nadesan	CF	(England)	Redhill	9 September 1994 (age 32)	Crawley Town	27 July 2023	Undisclosed	30 June 2025
12	Oliver Hawkins	CF	(England)	Ealing	8 April 1992 (age 34)	Mansfield Town	12 January 2023	Undisclosed	30 June 2024
19	Jorge Cabezas Hurtado	CF	(Colombia)	Tumaco	6 September 2003 (age 23)	Watford	1 February 2024	Loan	31 May 2024
23	Connor Mahoney	RW	(England)	Blackburn	12 February 1997 (age 29)	Huddersfield Town	25 August 2023	Loan	31 May 2024
29	Joseph Gbode	CF	(England)	Southwark	8 April 2005 (age 21)	Academy	1 July 2022	Trainee	30 June 2024
31	Ronald Sithole	CF	(England)			Academy	1 July 2023	Trainee	30 June 2024
36	Kieron Agbedi	CF	(England)			Dover Athletic	11 August 2023	Free Transfer	30 June 2024
47	Josh Walker	CF	(England)	London	28 December 1997 (age 28)	Burton Albion	25 January 2024	Loan	31 May 2024
Out on Loan
	Nathan Harvey	GK	(England)		8 June 2002 (age 24)	Charlton Athletic	3 September 2023	Free Transfer	
26	Ike Orji	RB	(England)		4 January 2003 (age 23)	Chatham Town	9 February 2023	Free Transfer	30 June 2024
30	Matthew MacArthur	LW	(Australia)	Sydney	24 September 2004 (age 22)	Southampton	1 July 2021	Free Transfer	30 June 2024
32	Josh Chambers	CM	(England)	London	13 November 2003 (age 22)	Academy	1 July 2022	Trainee	30 June 2024
34	Sam Gale	CM	(England)		1 October 2004 (age 22)	Academy	1 July 2021	Trainee	30 June 2024
45	Macauley Bonne	CF	(Zimbabwe)	(England) Ipswich	26 October 1995 (age 31)	Charlton Athletic	11 August 2023	Free Transfer	30 June 2025

== Transfers ==
=== In ===
Date	Pos	Player	Transferred from	Fee	Ref
1 July 2023	LB	(England) Max Clark	(England) Stevenage	Free Transfer	
1 July 2023	CB	(Republic of Ireland) Conor Masterson	(England) Queens Park Rangers	Free Transfer	
1 July 2023	AM	(Wales) Jonny Williams	(England) Swindon Town	Free Transfer	
18 July 2023	CB	(Republic of Ireland) Shadrach Ogie	(England) Leyton Orient	Undisclosed	
24 July 2023	LB	(England) Scott Malone	(England) Millwall	Free Transfer	
27 July 2023	CF	(England) Ashley Nadesan	(England) Crawley Town	Undisclosed	
11 August 2023	CF	(England) Kieron Agbedi	(England) Dover Athletic	Free Transfer	
11 August 2023	CF	(Zimbabwe) Macauley Bonne	(England) Charlton Athletic	Free Transfer	
3 September 2023	GK	(England) Nathan Harvey	(England) Charlton Athletic	Free Transfer	
17 January 2024	RB	(Burundi) Remeao Hutton	(England) Swindon Town	Undisclosed	
1 February 2024	CF	(England) Josh Andrews	(England) Birmingham City	Undisclosed	

=== Out ===
Date	Pos	Player	Transferred to	Fee	Ref
30 June 2023	LB	(England) Bailey Akehurst	(England) Hastings United	Released	
30 June 2023	CB	(England) Freddie Carter	(England) Eastbourne Borough	Released	
30 June 2023	LB	(England) Will Dempsey	(England) Folkestone Invicta	Released	
30 June 2023	RW	(England) Jordan Green	(England) Ramsgate	Released	
30 June 2023	RW	(England) Scott Kashket	(England) Sutton United	Released	
30 June 2023	CM	(United States) Julian Kuhr	Free agent	Released	
30 June 2023	RM	(Scotland) Alex MacDonald	(England) Stevenage	Free Transfer	
30 June 2023	CM	(England) Elliott Moore	(England) Folkestone Invicta	Released	
30 June 2023	CM	(England) Stuart O'Keefe	(England) Aldershot Town	Released	
30 June 2023	LB	(England) Lewis Page	(England) Dagenham & Redbridge	Released	
30 June 2023	AM	(Northern Ireland) Ben Reeves	Free agent	Released	
30 June 2023	LB	(Democratic Republic of the Congo) David Tutonda	(England) Morecambe	Free Transfer	
1 August 2023	RB	(England) Will Wright	(England) Crawley Town	Undisclosed	
17 January 2024	CF	(England) Lewis Walker	(England) Woking	Free Transfer	
29 January 2024	RB	(Saint Lucia) Cheye Alexander	Free agent	Mutual Consent	
1 February 2024	CF	(England) Tom Nichols	(England) Mansfield Town	Undisclosed	

=== Loaned in ===
Date	Pos	Player	Loaned from	Until	Ref
25 August 2023	RW	(England) Connor Mahoney	(England) Huddersfield Town	End of Season	
25 January 2024	CF	(England) Josh Walker	(England) Burton Albion	End of Season	
1 February 2024	CF	(Colombia) Jorge Cabezas Hurtado	(England) Watford	End of Season	

=== Loaned out ===
Date	Pos	Player	Loaned to	Until	Ref
3 September 2023	GK	(England) Nathan Harvey	(England) Lewes	End of Season	
29 September 2023	CF	(England) Lewis Walker	(England) Woking	1 January 2024	
4 October 2023	CF	(England) Joseph Gbode	(England) Maidstone United	1 November 2023	
11 November 2023	CM	(England) Josh Chambers	(England) Welling United	9 December 2023	
21 November 2023	DM	(England) Sam Gale	(England) Hastings United	19 December 2023	
2 December 2023	CF	(England) Joseph Gbode	(England) Aveley	22 February 2024	
5 December 2023	RB	(England) Ike Orji	(England) Welling United	2 January 2024	
9 December 2023	CB	(England) Alex Giles	(England) Chatham Town	6 January 2024	
5 January 2024	LW	(Australia) Matthew Macarthur	(England) Dartford	3 February 2024	
1 February 2024	CF	(Zimbabwe) Macauley Bonne	(England) Cambridge United	End of Season	
15 March 2024	LW	(Australia) Matthew Macarthur	(England) Tonbridge Angels	End of Season	
16 March 2024	RB	(England) Ike Orji	(England) Hemel Hempstead Town	End of Season	
22 March 2024	CM	(England) Josh Chambers	(England) Worthing	End of Season	

== Pre-season and friendlies ==
On 16 May, The Gills announced their first pre-season friendly, where an XI would travel to Tonbridge Angels. A day later, a second fixture was confirmed, against Dover Athletic. A third fixture was added in June, against Dartford. On June 5, a further fixture was announced, against Dagenham & Redbridge. A day later, a visit from Charlton Athletic was also added to the schedule. A seventh friendly, against Millwall was later announced. On 30 June, the club announced their full schedule, which included one final friendly which was a behind closed doors game against Cambridge United on 25 July.

Also confirmed by the club was a pre-season tour to Como in Italy for a five-day warm weather training camp.

Win Draw Loss Fixtures

8 July 2023 Friendly	Dover Athletic	0–4	Gillingham	River
13:00 BST		Report	Nichols 8'; Hawkins 38'; Masterson 58'; Walker 64'	Stadium: Crabble

12 July 2023 Friendly	Como	0–1	Gillingham	Como
13:00 CEST; 12:00 BST		Report	Jefferies 88'	Stadium: Stadio Giuseppe Sinigaglia

15 July 2023 Friendly	Gillingham	0–2	Millwall	Gillingham
13:00 BST		Report	Nisbet 25' (pen.); Emakhu 87'	Stadium: Priestfield; Attendance: 5,012; Referee: John Busby

18 July 2023 Friendly	Gillingham	1–3	Charlton Athletic	Gillingham
19:30 BST	Wright 32'	Report	Campbell 1'; Blackett-Taylor 53'; Payne 55'	Stadium: Priestfield Stadium; Attendance: 2,932; Referee: Gavin Ward

22 July 2023 Friendly	Dartford	0–5	Gillingham	Dartford
13:00 BST		Report	Williams 9', 35'; Dieng 19'; Jefferies 48'; Clarke 84'	Stadium: Princes Park; Attendance: 884; Referee: Isaac Searle

25 July 2023 Friendly	Cambridge United	4-0	Gillingham	Cambridge
13:00 BST	Brophy 2'; Okenabirhie 28', 59' (pen.); Cousins 35'	Report		Stadium: Abbey Stadium; Attendance: 0 (behind closed doors)

29 July 2023 Friendly	Dagenham & Redbridge	0–1	Gillingham	Dagenham
15:00 BST		Report	Ogie 52'	Stadium: Chigwell Construction Stadium; Attendance: 579

== Competitions ==
=== Overall record ===
Competition	Starting round	Final position	Record							
Competition	Starting round	Final position	Pld	W	D	L	GF	GA	GD	Win %
League Two	Matchday 1	12th	46	18	10	18	46	57	−11	39.13
FA Cup	First round	Third round	3	2	0	1	4	4	+0	66.67
EFL Cup	First round	Second round	2	1	0	1	5	4	+1	50.00
EFL Trophy	Group stage	Group Stage	3	1	0	2	3	7	−4	33.33
Total			54	22	10	22	58	72	−14	40.74

Last updated: 27 April 2024
Source: Soccerway

=== League Two ===
==== League table ====
Pos	Team	Pld	W	D	L	GF	GA	GD	Pts
9	Bradford City	46	19	12	15	61	59	+2	69
10	AFC Wimbledon	46	17	14	15	64	51	+13	65
11	Walsall	46	18	11	17	69	73	−4	65
12	Gillingham	46	18	10	18	46	57	−11	64
13	Harrogate Town	46	17	12	17	60	69	−9	63
14	Notts County	46	18	7	21	89	86	+3	61
15	Morecambe	46	17	10	19	67	81	−14	58 (Note: On 11 April 2024, Morecambe were deducted three points for failing to pay players and staff on time following previous EFL rules breaches in the 2023–24 season.)

Source: EFL Official Website
Rules for classification: 1) Points; 2) Goal difference; 3) Number of goals scored; 4) Head-to-head results; 5) Wins; 6) Away goals; 7) Penalty points (sec 9.5); 8) 12-point sending off offences

==== Results summary ====
Overall								Home						Away					
Pld	W	D	L	GF	GA	GD	Pts	W	D	L	GF	GA	GD	W	D	L	GF	GA	GD
46	18	10	18	46	57	−11	64	9	9	5	25	23	+2	9	1	13	21	34	−13

Last updated: 27 April 2024.
Source: Soccerway

==== Matches ====
On 22 June, the EFL League Two fixtures were released.

Win Draw Loss Fixtures

5 August 2023 1	Stockport County	0–1	Gillingham	Edgeley
15:00 BST		Report	Williams (yellow card) 3'; Coleman (yellow card) 45'; Ogie (yellow card) 58'; Nichols (yellow card) 76'; McKenzie 86'; Clarke (yellow card) 90+4'	Stadium: Edgeley Park; Attendance: 9,116; Referee: Ben Speedie

12 August 2023 2	Gillingham	1–0	Accrington Stanley	Gillingham
15:00 BST	Jefferies (yellow card) 5'; Nadesan 29'; Ogie (yellow card) 58'; Ehmer (yellow card) 90'	Report	Andrews (yellow card) 26'; Rich-Baghuelou (yellow card) 62'	Stadium: Priestfield Stadium; Attendance: 6,489; Referee: Will Finnie

15 August 2023 3	Sutton United	0–1	Gillingham	Sutton
19:45 BST	Angol (yellow card) 5'; Milsom (yellow card) 25'	Report	Nadesan 10'; Coleman (yellow card) 76'	Stadium: Gander Green Lane; Attendance: 3,714; Referee: Scott Tallis

19 August 2023 4	Crawley Town	0–1	Gillingham	Crawley
15:00 BST	Telford (penalty missed) 15'; Kelly (yellow card) 53'; Addai (yellow card) 90+6'; Darcy (yellow card) 90+6'	Report	Ogie (yellow card) 3'; Ransom 40' (o.g.); Alexander (yellow card) 90+3'; Malone (yellow card) 90+4'	Stadium: Broadfield Stadium; Attendance: 4,310; Referee: Edward Duckworth

26 August 2023 5	Gillingham	0–3	Colchester United	Gillingham
15:00 BST	Malone (yellow card) 35'; Williams (yellow card) 41'; Coleman (red card) 87'	Report	Taylor (yellow card) 18'; Egbo (yellow card) 33'; Tchamadeu (yellow card) 40'; Kelleher 64'; Tovide 77'; Ihionvien 82' (yellow card) 83'	Stadium: MEMS Priestfield Stadium; Attendance: 6,991; Referee: Thomas Kirk

2 September 2023 6	Grimsby Town	2–0	Gillingham	Cleethorpes
15:00 BST	Maher 12'; Holohan 27'; Amos (yellow card) 90+3'	Report		Stadium: Blundell Park; Attendance: 6,479; Referee: Adam Herczeg

9 September 2023 7	Gillingham	1–0	Harrogate Town	Gillingham
15:00 BST	J. Williams (yellow card) 35'; S. Williams (yellow card) 59' (goal) 90+5'; Masterson (yellow card) 64'	Report	Ramsay (yellow card) 61'	Stadium: MEMS Priestfield Stadium; Attendance: 5,778; Referee: Neil Hair

16 September 2023 8	Gillingham	2–1	Morecambe	Gillingham
15:00 BST	Lapslie 9'; Mahoney 23'; J. Williams (yellow card) 36'; S. Williams (yellow card) 58'	Report	Mellin 11' (yellow card) 39' (yellow-red card) 76'; Connolly (yellow card) 52'; Love (yellow card) 76'; Tutonda (yellow card) 90+3'	Stadium: MEMS Priestfield Stadium; Attendance: 5,915; Referee: Declan Bourne

23 September 2023 9	Doncaster Rovers	2–1	Gillingham	Doncaster
15:00 BST	Close 12', 87'; Biggins (yellow card) 34'; Ironside (yellow card) 90'	Report	Masterson 45+2'; Coleman (yellow card) 53'; Malone (yellow card) 90+5'	Stadium: The Eco-Power Stadium; Attendance: 6,371; Referee: Thomas Parsons

30 September 2023 10	Gillingham	1–1	Mansfield Town	Gillingham
15:00 BST	Bonne 2'; Coleman (yellow card) 37'; Malone (yellow card) 40'; Williams (yellow card) 59'; Ogie (yellow card) 90+5'	Report	Macdonald (yellow card) 6'; Keillor-Dunn 36' (yellow card) 83'	Stadium: MEMS Priestfield Stadium; Attendance: 6,488; Referee: Jacob Miles

3 October 2023 11	Crewe Alexandra	2–0	Gillingham	Crewe
19:45 BST	O'Riordan 30'; Powell (yellow card) 35'; White 85'	Report		Stadium: Mornflake Stadium; Attendance: 3,427; Referee: Daniel Middleton

7 October 2023 12	Gillingham	2–1	Milton Keynes Dons	Gillingham
15:00 BST	Bonne 26'; Malone (yellow card) 35', (goal) 55'; Turner (yellow card) 73'	Report	Williams (yellow card) 58'; Harvie (yellow card) 62' (yellow-red card) 90+2'; Dean (yellow card) 81'; Harrison 82'; Stewart (yellow card) 90'	Stadium: MEMS Priestfield Stadium; Attendance: 6,119; Referee: Darren Drysdale

14 October 2023 13	Walsall	4–1	Gillingham	Walsall
15:00 BST	Hutchinson 34', 59', 85'; Draper 39'; Tierney (yellow card) 70'; Knowles (yellow card) 72'; McEntee (yellow card) 77'	Report	Clark (yellow card) 49'; Bonne 60', (yellow card) 74'; Ogie (yellow card) 90+5'	Stadium: Poundland Bescot Stadium; Attendance: 5,632; Referee: Charles Breakspear

14 October 2023 14	Gillingham	1–2	Notts County	Gillingham
15:00 BST	Malone 52', (yellow card) 52'; Lapslie (yellow card) 77'	Report	Langstaff 38'; Macari 78'; O'Brien (yellow card) 84'; Cameron (yellow card) 90+6'; McGoldrick (yellow card) 90+6'	Stadium: MEMS Priestfield Stadium; Attendance: 6,983; Referee: Alan Young

24 October 2023 15	Swindon Town	0–1	Gillingham	Swindon
19:45 BST		Report	Mahoney 22'; Clarke (yellow card) 68'; Alexander (penalty missed) 74', (yellow card) 79'	Stadium: The County Ground; Attendance: 8,853; Referee: Peter Wright

28 October 2023 16	Gillingham	0–2	Newport County	Gillingham
15:00 BST	Ogie (yellow card) 81'	Report	Drysdale (yellow card) 3'; Bogle 20' (pen.), 27' (pen.); Baker (yellow card) 29'; Evans (yellow card) 45+5'	Stadium: MEMS Priestfield Stadium; Attendance: 5,869; Referee: Tom Reeves

11 November 2023 17	Wrexham	2–0	Gillingham	Wrexham
15:00 GMT	Palmer 1'; Tozer 71'	Report		Stadium: STōK Racecourse; Attendance: 10,268; Referee: Will Finnie

18 November 2023 18	Gillingham	3–1	Salford City	Gillingham
15:00 GMT	Mahoney 22'; Clark (yellow card) 26'; Nichols 54' (yellow card) 76'; Jefferies 62'	Report	Smith 37'; Mallan (yellow card) 44'	Stadium: Priestfield Stadium; Attendance: 6,431; Referee: Paul Howard

25 November 2023 19	Tranmere Rovers	3–1	Gillingham	Birkenhead
15:00 GMT	Jennings (yellow card) 36' (goal) 53'; Dennis (yellow card) 39'; Apter 43', 60'; McAlear (yellow card) 90+6'	Report	Masterson (yellow card) 45'; Lapslie (yellow card) 54'; Mahoney 90+1'	Stadium: Prenton Park; Attendance: 5,283; Referee: Marc Edwards

28 November 2023 20	Gillingham	1–0	AFC Wimbledon	Gillingham
19:45 GMT	Masterson 85'	Report	Tilley (yellow card) 43'	Stadium: Priestfield Stadium; Attendance: 5,747; Referee: Lee Swabey

16 December 2023 22	Gillingham	0–2	Bradford City	Gillingham
15:00 GMT	Bonne (yellow card) 55'; Ehmer (yellow card) 57'; Masterson (yellow card) 59'	Report	Walker 31'; Platt (yellow card) 50'; Gilliead (yellow card) 51'; Kelly (yellow card) 55'; Halliday (yellow card) 60'; Cook 75'; Richards (yellow card) 86'	Stadium: Priestfield Stadium; Attendance: 4,874; Referee: Scott Jackson

22 December 2023 23	Forest Green Rovers	0–0	Gillingham	Nailsworth
19:00 GMT	Daniels (yellow card) 25'; Bendle (yellow card) 90+5'	Report	Nadesan (yellow card) 86'	Stadium: The Bolt New Lawn; Referee: Sam Allison

26 December 2023 24	Gillingham	0–2	Crawley Town	Gillingham
13:00 GMT	Ehmer (yellow card) 12'; Malone (yellow card) 22'	Report	Wright 24', (yellow card) 24'; Darcy (yellow card) 45+3'; Maguire (yellow card) 63'; Roles 71'; Campbell (yellow card) 73'; Adeyemo (yellow card) 81'	Stadium: Priestfield Stadium; Attendance: 7,150; Referee: Ben Atkinson

29 December 2023 25	Gillingham	1–0	Sutton United	Gillingham
19:45 GMT	Coleman (yellow card) 36'; Malone 72'	Report	Goodliffe (yellow card) 9'; Smith (red card) 26'; Hart (yellow card) 83'; Clay (yellow card) 84'	Stadium: Priestfield Stadium; Attendance: 6,334; Referee: David Rock

1 January 2024 26	Colchester United	0–1	Gillingham	Colchester
15:00 GMT	Iandolo (yellow card) 32'	Report	Malone 54', (yellow card) 90+4'; Bonne (yellow card) 80'; Lapslie (yellow card) 90'	Stadium: JobServe Community Stadium; Attendance: 4,923; Referee: Sam Purkiss

13 January 2024 28	Accrington Stanley	1–2	Gillingham	Accrington
15:00 GMT	Gubbins (yellow card) 44'; Shipley (yellow card) 45+1'; Henderson 50'	Report	Masterson 62'; Bonne 75'; Malone (yellow card) 82'	Stadium: Wham Stadium; Attendance: 2,383; Referee: Daniel Middleton

20 January 2024 29	Gillingham	1–1	Forest Green Rovers	Gillingham
15:00 GMT	Ogie (yellow card) 43'; Hutton (yellow card) 55'; Coleman (yellow card) 61'; Hawkins 67'; Ehmer (yellow card) 86'	Report	Thompson (yellow card) 55'; Jones 75'; Dabo (yellow card) 90+4'	Stadium: Priestfield Stadium; Referee: Craig Hicks

27 January 2024 30	Milton Keynes Dons	2–1	Gillingham	Denbigh
15:00 GMT	Payne (yellow card) 69'; Williams 79'; Gilbey 88'	Report	Walker 90'	Stadium: Stadium MK; Attendance: 6,723; Referee: Carl Brook

3 February 2024 31	Gillingham	1–1	Walsall	Gillingham
15:00 GMT	Lapslie (yellow card) 40'; Ogie (yellow card) 61'; Masterson 77'; Dieng (yellow card) 89'	Report	Gordon (yellow card) 33'; Okagbue (yellow card) 58'; Hutchinson 62' (pen.)	Stadium: Priestfield Stadium; Attendance: 5,710; Referee: Charles Breakspear

9 February 2024 32	Notts County	1–3	Gillingham	Nottingham
19:45 GMT	Crowley 13'; Bostock (yellow card) 45+3'; McGoldrick (yellow card) 88'	Report	Hawkins 19'; Clark 35'; Masterson 53'; Dieng (yellow card) 67'	Stadium: Meadow Lane; Referee: Scott Oldham

13 February 2024 33	Gillingham	2–2	Swindon Town	Gillingham
19:45 GMT	Dieng (yellow card) 52'; Hawkins 68'; Mahoney 79' (pen.)	Report	McGurk 24'; Blake-Tracy (yellow card) 78'; McEachran (yellow card) 83'; McKirdy 90+4'	Stadium: Priestfield Stadium; Attendance: 2,260; Referee: Declan Bourne

17 February 2024 34	Newport County	1–0	Gillingham	Newport
15:00 GMT	Evans 61'; Charsley (yellow card) 89'; Townsend (yellow card) 90+6'	Report	Hutton (yellow card) 26'; Masterson (yellow card) 90+4'	Stadium: Rodney Parade; Attendance: 4,724; Referee: Ollie Yates

20 February 2024 27	Gillingham	0–0	Stockport County	Gillingham
19:45 GMT	Ehmer (yellow card) 21'	Report	Collar (yellow card) 27'; Croasdale (yellow card) 40'	Stadium: Priestfield Stadium; Attendance: 5,321; Referee: Lee Swabey
Note: Fixture was initially scheduled for 6 January, but was postponed due to FA Cup commitments.

24 February 2024 35	Gillingham	1–0	Wrexham	Gillingham
15:00 GMT	Dieng 54'	Report	Lee (yellow card) 69'; Bolton (yellow card) 81'	Stadium: Priestfield Stadium; Attendance: 8,693; Referee: Scott Simpson

2 March 2024 36	Salford City	0–2	Gillingham	Kersal
15:00 GMT	Ingram (yellow card) 17'; Tilt (yellow card) 35'; Cairns (yellow card) 52'	Report	Masterson (yellow card) 36'; Ogie 43'; Dieng 51'	Stadium: Peninsula Stadium; Attendance: 2,995; Referee: Ross Joyce

5 March 2024 21	Barrow	2–0	Gillingham	Barrow-in-Furness
19:45 GMT	Stockton (yellow card) 4'; Spence (yellow card) 9'; Chester 40'; Acquah 55'; Campbell (yellow card) 66'	Report	Coleman (yellow card) 39'; Williams (yellow card) 66'; Masterson (yellow card) 90+6'; Hutton (yellow card) 90+6'	Stadium: Holker Street; Attendance: 3,044; Referee: Scott Tallis
Note: Fixture was originally scheduled for 9 December, but was postponed due to an unplayable playing surface.

9 March 2024 37	Gillingham	1–1	Tranmere Rovers	Gillingham
15:00 GMT	Dieng (yellow card) 29'; Masterson 84'	Report	Hendry 4' (yellow card) 90'; Merrie (yellow card) 10'; McGee (yellow card) 90'	Stadium: Priestfield Stadium; Attendance: 6,077; Referee: James Linngton

12 March 2024 38	AFC Wimbledon	2–0	Gillingham	Wimbledon
19:45 GMT	Bugiel 33' 65'; Neufville (yellow card) 87'	Report	Ehmer (yellow card) 11'; Masterson (yellow card) 36' 38; Clark (yellow card) 58'	Stadium: The Cherry Red Records Stadium; Attendance: 7,527; Referee: Thomas Kirk

16 March 2024 39	Gillingham	1–1	Grimsby Town	Gillingham
15:00 GMT	Lapslie 15', (yellow card) 84'; McKenzie (yellow card) 83'	Report	Wilson 13'; Clifton (yellow card) 18'; Tharme (yellow card) 22'; Hume (yellow card) 66'	Stadium: Priestfield Stadium; Attendance: 6,065; Referee: James Bell

23 March 2024 40	Morecambe	2–3	Gillingham	Morecambe
15:00 BST	Slew 11', (yellow card) 74'; Brown (yellow card) 23', (goal) 64'; Adams (yellow card) 61'; Khumbeni (yellow card) 90+2'	Report	Hawkins 18'; Dieng 73', (yellow card) 90+5'; Malone (yellow card) 83'; Mahoney 86'	Stadium: Mazuma Stadium; Attendance: 3,408; Referee: Paul Howard

29 March 2024 41	Gillingham	0–0	Crewe Alexandra	Gillingham
15:00 GMT	Morris (yellow card) 46'; Ehmer (yellow card) 82'	Report	Cooney (yellow card) 70'; Austerfield (yellow card) 74'; Turns (yellow card) 84'	Stadium: Priestfield Stadium; Attendance: 7,112; Referee: Tom Reeves

1 April 2024 42	Harrogate Town	5–1	Gillingham	Harrogate
15:00 BST	Dooley (yellow card) 15'; March (yellow card) 55'; O'Connor 60'; Daly 68', 70'; Sutton (yellow card) 72'; Muldoon 90+3'; Odoh 90+5'	Report	Lapslie 41'; Hutton (yellow card) 59'; Andrews (yellow card) 90+6'	Stadium: Wetherby Road; Attendance: 3,133; Referee: Simon Mather

6 April 2024 43	Bradford City	1–0	Gillingham	Bradford
15:00 BST	Halliday 43'; Oyegoke (yellow card) 67'	Report	Lapslie (yellow card) 66'; Ehmer (yellow card) 68'	Stadium: Valley Parade; Referee: Edward Duckworth

13 April 2024 44	Gillingham	3–0	Barrow	Gillingham
15:00 BST	Andrews 45+3'; Feely 55' (o.g.); Mahoney 64'	Report	Ray (red card) 22'	Stadium: Priestfield Stadium; Attendance: 5,796; Referee: Dean Whitestone

20 April 2024 45	Mansfield Town	2–1	Gillingham	Mansfield
15:00 BST	Boateng (yellow card) 30'; Keillor-Dunn 77'; McLaughlin 80'	Report	Dieng 19'; Jefferies (yellow card) 64'; Ehmer (yellow card) 86'	Stadium: Field Mill; Attendance: 8,150; Referee: Sam Purkiss

27 April 2024 46	Gillingham	2–2	Doncaster Rovers	Gillingham
15:00 BST	Andrews (yellow card) 13'; Dieng 57'; Anderson 62' (o.g.); Ehmer (yellow card) 71'	Report	Ironside 30'; Molyneux 37'; Lo-Tutala (red card) 55'; Craig (yellow card) 77'	Stadium: Priestfield Stadium; Attendance: 8,723; Referee: Alex Chilowicz

=== FA Cup ===
The Gills were drawn away to Hereford in the first round, at home to either Charlton Athletic or Cray Valley Paper Mills in the second round, and at home to Sheffield United in the third round.

Win Draw Loss Fixtures

4 November 2023 First round	Hereford	0–2	Gillingham	Hereford
15:00 GMT	Livingstone (yellow card) 39'; Ceesay (yellow card) 45+2'; Babos (yellow card) 51'; Cameron (yellow card) 51'; Southern (yellow card) 86'; Teixeira (yellow card) 88'	Report	Clarke 23'; Nichols 88' (pen.)	Stadium: Edgar Street; Attendance: 4,376; Referee: Ollie Yates

2 December 2023 Second round	Gillingham	2–0	Charlton Athletic	Gillingham
15:00 GMT	Bonne 26'; Dieng 30'; Malone (yellow card) 90+4'	Report	May (yellow card) 44'; Ness (yellow card) 56'; Dobson (yellow card) 71'	Stadium: Priestfield Stadium; Attendance: 7,717; Referee: Sunny Gill

6 January 2024 Third round	Gillingham	0–4	Sheffield United	Gillingham
15:00 GMT	Coleman (yellow card) 82'	Report	Osula 14', 39'; Thomas (yellow card) 41'; McAtee 83', 87'	Stadium: Priestfield Stadium; Attendance: 8,809; Referee: Darren Bond

=== EFL Cup ===
Gillingham were drawn at home to Southampton in the first round, and away to Luton Town in the second round.

Win Draw Loss Fixtures

8 August 2023 First round	Gillingham	3–1	Southampton	Gillingham
19:45 BST	Nadesan 12'; Lapslie (yellow card) 27'; McKenzie 51', 67' (yellow card) 65'; Jefferies (yellow card) 58'; Ehmer (yellow card) 88'; Gbode (yellow card) 90+2'	Report	Perraud (yellow card) 44'; Charles (yellow card) 64'; Lyanco (yellow card) 78'; Alcaraz 89'	Stadium: Priestfield; Attendance: 7,775; Referee: Carl Brook

29 August 2023 Second round	Luton Town	3–2	Gillingham	Luton
19:45 BST	Brown 2'; Doughty 28'; Berry (yellow card) 34'; Woodrow 66'	Report	Dieng (yellow card) 43'; Clarke 55'; Nichols 88'	Stadium: Kenilworth Road; Attendance: 9,468; Referee: Jeremy Simpson

=== EFL Trophy ===
In the group stage, Gillingham were drawn into Southern Group E along with Leyton Orient, Portsmouth and Fulham U21.

Pos	Div	Team	Pld	W	PW	PL	L	GF	GA	GD	Pts	Qualification
1	L1	Portsmouth	3	2	1	0	0	10	5	+5	8	Advance to Round 2
2	ACA	Fulham U21	3	1	0	2	0	6	5	+1	5	Advance to Round 2
3	L2	Gillingham	3	1	0	0	2	3	7	−4	3	
4	L1	Leyton Orient	3	0	1	0	2	4	6	−2	2	

Updated to match(es) played on 7 November 2023. Source: EFL.com

Win Draw Loss Fixtures

5 September 2023 Group stage	Gillingham	2–1	Leyton Orient	Gillingham
19:00 BST	Coleman (yellow card) 67'; Alexander 80' (pen.); Beckles 83' (o.g.)	Report	Morris 43' (o.g.); Cooper (yellow card) 45+1' (red card) 65'; Galbraith (yellow card) 61'; Forde (red card) 62'; Sanders (yellow card) 65'; Archibald (yellow card) 81'	Stadium: Priestfield; Attendance: 1,388; Referee: Ben Atkinson

10 October 2023 Group stage	Portsmouth	5–1	Gillingham	Portsmouth
19:45 BST	Anjorin 11'; Towler (yellow card) 47' (goal) 80'; Stevenson 50'; Yengi 54'; Kamara 72'		Jefferies (yellow card) 25'; Ogie (yellow card) 37'; Williams J. 45'; Orji (yellow card) 53'	Stadium: Fratton Park; Attendance: 5,066; Referee: Farai Hallam

7 November 2023 Group stage	Gillingham	0–1	Fulham U21	Gillingham
19:00 GMT		Report	Loupalo-Bi 43': O'Neill (yellow card) 87'	Stadium: Priestfield; Attendance: 1,226; Referee: Craig Hicks
