= 2022–23 Gillingham F.C. season =

English football club season

Gillingham
2022–23 season
- Chairman: Paul Scally
- Manager: Neil Harris
- Stadium: Priestfield Stadium
- League Two: 17th
- FA Cup: Third round
- EFL Cup: Fourth round
- EFL Trophy: Group stage
- Top goalscorer: League: Tom Nichols (6); All: Tom Nichols (6)
- Highest home attendance: 8,567 vs Leicester City (7 January 2023); FA Cup
- Lowest home attendance: 826 vs Colchester United (11 October 2022); EFL Trophy
- Average home league attendance: 5,375
Home colours	Away colours	Third colours

The 2022–23 season was the 130th season in the existence of Gillingham Football Club and the club's first season back in League Two since the 2012–13 season following their relegation from League One the season before. In addition to the league, they also competed in the 2022–23 FA Cup, the 2022–23 EFL Cup and the 2022–23 EFL Trophy.

== Transfers ==
=== In ===
Date	Pos	Player	Transferred from	Fee	Ref
22 June 2022 (Note: The transfer was announced on 16 June, and would become official on 22 June once the players returned.)	CM	(Wales) Dom Jefferies	(England) Brentford	Free Transfer	
1 July 2022 (Note: The transfer was announced on 28 June, and would become official on 1 July, once his Crewe Alexandra contract expired)	RW	(England) Scott Kashket	(England) Crewe Alexandra	Free Transfer	
1 July 2022 (Note: The transfer was announced on 30 June, and would become official on 1 July, once his Newcastle United contract expired)	GK	(England) Jake Turner	(England) Newcastle United	Free Transfer	
1 July 2022 (Note: The transfer was announced on 10 June, and would become official on 1 July, once his Portsmouth contract expired)	DM	(Republic of Ireland) Shaun Williams	(England) Portsmouth	Free Transfer	
1 July 2022 (Note: The transfer was announced on 1 June, and would become official on 1 July, once his Dagenham & Redbridge contract expired)	RB	(England) Will Wright	(England) Dagenham & Redbridge	Free Transfer	
11 July 2022	CF	(France) Mikael Mandron	(England) Crewe Alexandra	Free Transfer	
15 July 2022	RB	(England) Cheye Alexander	(England) AFC Wimbledon	Free Transfer	
15 July 2022	RW	(England) Jordan Green	(England) Dulwich Hamlet	Free Transfer	
29 July 2022	CF	(England) Lewis Walker	(Italy) Athletic Carpi	Free Transfer	
1 September 2022	RB	(England) Robbie McKenzie	(England) Hull City	Undisclosed	
23 November 2022	LW	(Guyana) Callum Harriott	Free Agent	—N/a	
1 January 2023 (Note: The transfer was announced on 28 December, and would become official on 1 January, once the transfer window re-opens)	CF	(England) Tom Nichols	(England) Crawley Town	Undisclosed	
11 January 2023	DM	(France) Timothée Dieng	(England) Exeter City	Undisclosed	
12 January 2023	CF	(England) Oliver Hawkins	(England) Mansfield Town	Undisclosed	
12 January 2023	GK	(England) Glenn Morris	(England) Crawley Town	Free Transfer	
14 January 2023	CM	(England) George Lapslie	(England) Mansfield Town	Undisclosed	
19 January 2023	MF	(England) Jayden Clarke	(England) Dulwich Hamlet	Undisclosed	
19 January 2023	DM	(England) Ethan Coleman	(England) Leyton Orient	Undisclosed	
9 February 2023	DF	(England) Ike Orji	(England) Chatham Town	Undisclosed	
2 March 2023	LB	(England) Lewis Page	(England) Mansfield Town	Free Transfer	

=== Out ===
Date	Pos	Player	Transferred to	Fee	Ref
27 June 2022	CM	(England) Henry Woods	(England) Maidstone United	Free transfer	
30 June 2022	LW	(The Gambia) Mustapha Carayol	(England) Burton Albion	Released	
30 June 2022	GK	(England) Aaron Chapman	(England) Stevenage	Released	
30 June 2022	GK	(England) Tommy Crump	(England) Harlow Town	Released	
30 June 2022	RB	(England) Ryan Jackson	(England) Cheltenham Town	Released	
30 June 2022	RB	(England) Harvey Lintott	(England) Northampton Town	Released	
30 June 2022	RW	(England) Danny Lloyd	(England) Rochdale	Released	
30 June 2022	CB	(Democratic Republic of the Congo) Christian Maghoma	(England) Eastleigh	Released	
30 June 2022	CF	(England) Vadaine Oliver	(England) Bradford City	Released	
30 June 2022	CF	(England) Gerald Sithole	(England) Bolton Wanderers	Released	
30 June 2022	CM	(England) Ben Thompson	(England) Peterborough United	Released	
30 June 2022 (Note: The transfer was announced on 17 June, and would become official on 1 July, once his contract at the club expired)	CB	(England) Jack Tucker	(England) Milton Keynes Dons	Compensation	
13 January 2023	CF	(France) Mikael Mandron	(Scotland) Motherwell	Mutual Consent	
22 February 2023	CM	(England) Olly Lee	Retired		
28 February 2023	LW	(Guyana) Callum Harriott	(England) Yeovil Town	Free Transfer	

=== Loans in ===
Date	Pos	Player	Loaned from	On loan until	Ref
28 June 2022	GK	(Australia) Ashley Maynard-Brewer	(England) Charlton Athletic	17 November 2022 (Note: On 17 November, Maynard-Brewer was recalled back from his parent club, Charlton.)	
8 July 2022	CB	(Indonesia) Elkan Baggott	(England) Ipswich Town	19 January 2023 (Note: On 19 January, Baggott was recalled back to Ipswich)	
18 July 2022	LB	(England) Ryan Law	(England) Plymouth Argyle	9 January 2023 (Note: On 9 January, Law was recalled back to Plymouth)	
29 July 2022	GK	(England) Glenn Morris	(England) Crawley Town	31 December 2022	
15 August 2022	RW	(England) Hakeeb Adelakun	(England) Lincoln City	End of Season	
1 September 2022	CB	(Tanzania) Haji Mnoga	(England) Portsmouth	17 January 2023 (Note: On 17 January, Mnoga returned to Portsmouth to move elsewhere)	
26 January 2023	CB	(Republic of Ireland) Conor Masterson	(England) Queens Park Rangers	End of Season	
31 January 2023	CF	(England) Tristan Abrahams	(England) Eastleigh	End of Season	
31 January 2023	LW	(Republic of Ireland) Aiden O'Brien	(England) Shrewsbury Town	End of Season	

=== Loans out ===
Date	Pos	Player	Loaned to	On loan until	Ref
26 August 2022	MF	(England) Joseph Gbode	(England) Hastings United	Short-term	
7 September 2022	MF	(England) Sam Gale	(England) Sheppey United	Short-term	
25 September 2022	CB	(England) Freddie Carter	(England) Cray Wanderers	End of Season	
6 November 2022	CM	(England) Josh Chambers	(England) Worthing	20 April 2023	
15 November 2022	CB	(England) Alex Giles	(England) Sheppey United	Short-term	
24 December 2022	MF	(Australia) Matty Macarthur	(England) Margate	21 March 2023	
19 January 2023	MF	(United States) Julian Kuhr	(England) Lordswood	End of Season	
9 February 2023	DF	(England) Ike Orji	(England) Chatham Town	End of Season	
3 March 2023	DF	(England) Will Dempsey	(England) Lordswood	End of Season	
23 March 2023	MF	(Australia) Matty Macarthur	(England) Sheppey United	Short-term	

== Pre-season and friendlies ==
The Gills announced their first pre-season friendly with a trip to Folkestone Invicta on 2 July. A week later, the club announced two further fixtures to their schedule with a trip to Dover Athletic and a visit from Portsmouth to Priestfield Stadium. A trip to Deal Town was confirmed shortly afterwards. A Gills XI was soon announced to have a trip to Chatham Town and a trip to Ramsgate, the latter on the same date as the Portsmouth friendly. A seventh friendly, against Southend United was confirmed on 1 June. On 13 July the Gills added to the schedule, with Crystal Palace visiting the Priestfield Stadium.

Win Draw Loss Fixtures

2 July 2022 Friendly	Folkestone Invicta	0–2	Gillingham	Folkestone
15:00 BST		Report	Green 55'; Lee 76' (pen.)	Stadium: The BuildKent Stadium; Attendance: 949; Referee: Kirsty Dowle

5 July 2022 Friendly	Deal Town	3–0	Gillingham XI	Deal
19:45 BST	Alford; Chapman; Walsh	Report		Stadium: Charles Sports Ground; Attendance: 422

9 July 2022 Friendly	Dover Athletic	2–0	Gillingham	River
13:00 BST	Higgs 44'; Krasniqi 51'	Report		Stadium: Crabble; Attendance: 917; Referee: Nick Dunn

13 July 2022 Friendly	Luton Town	2–1	Gillingham	Luton
15:00 BST	Jerome 21' (pen.) 29'	Report	Williams 50'	Stadium: The Brache; Attendance: 0 (behind closed doors)

16 July 2022 Friendly	Gillingham	1–2	Portsmouth	Gillingham
15:00 BST	Lee 70'	Report	Hackett-Fairchild 27'; Ogilvie 89'	Stadium: MEMS Priestfield Stadium; Attendance: 1,356; Referee: Tim Robinson

16 July 2022 Friendly	Ramsgate	4–0	Gillingham XI	Ramsgate
15:00 BST		Report		Stadium: Southwood Stadium

19 July 2022 Friendly	Gillingham	2–3	Crystal Palace	Gillingham
19:00 BST	Lee 50', 67' (pen.)	Report	Zaha 13', 72' (pen.); Benteke 23'	Stadium: MEMS Priestfield Stadium; Attendance: 3,033; Referee: Chris Pollard

22 July 2022 Friendly	Chatham Town	0–3	Gillingham XI	Chatham
20:00 BST		Report	Macarthur 3' 20'; Sithole 50'	Stadium: Bauvill Stadium; Attendance: 805

23 July 2022 Friendly	Southend United	0–1	Gillingham	Southend-on-Sea
15:00 BST		Report	Mandron 56'	Stadium: Roots Hall; Attendance: 1,374; Referee: Callum Walchester

26 July 2022 Friendly	Bearsted	1–1	Gillingham XI	Otham
19:00 BST	8'	Report	Sithole (?)	Stadium: Honey Lane

== Competitions ==
=== Overall record ===
Competition	First match	Last match	Starting round	Record							
Competition	First match	Last match	Starting round	Pld	W	D	L	GF	GA	GD	Win %
League Two	30 July 2022	6 May 2023	Matchday 1	46	14	13	19	36	49	−13	30.43
FA Cup	5 November 2022	7 January 2023	First round	5	2	2	1	6	5	+1	40.00
EFL Cup	9 August 2022	20 December 2022	First round	4	1	2	1	3	3	+0	25.00
EFL Trophy	31 August 2022	11 October 2022	Group stage	3	1	1	1	4	6	−2	33.33
Total				58	18	18	22	49	63	−14	31.03

Last updated: 8 May 2023
Source: [ Soccerway]

=== League Two ===
==== League table ====
Pos	Team	Pld	W	D	L	GF	GA	GD	Pts
14	Sutton United	46	15	13	18	46	58	−12	58
15	Newport County	46	14	15	17	53	56	−3	57
16	Walsall	46	12	19	15	46	49	−3	55
17	Gillingham	46	14	13	19	36	49	−13	55
18	Doncaster Rovers	46	16	7	23	46	65	−19	55
19	Harrogate Town	46	12	16	18	59	68	−9	52
20	Colchester United	46	12	13	21	44	51	−7	49

Source: EFL Official Website
Rules for classification: 1) Points; 2) Goal difference; 3) Number of goals scored; 4) Head-to-head results; 5) Wins; 6) Away goals; 7) Penalty points (sec 9.5); 8) 12-point sending off offences

==== Results summary ====
Overall								Home						Away					
Pld	W	D	L	GF	GA	GD	Pts	W	D	L	GF	GA	GD	W	D	L	GF	GA	GD
46	14	13	19	36	49	−13	55	11	5	7	21	20	+1	3	8	12	15	29	−14

Last updated: 8 May 2023.
Source: [ Soccerway]

==== Results by round ====
Round	1	2	3	4	5	6	7	8	9	10	11	12	13	14	15	16	17	18	19	20	21	22	23	24	25	26	27	28	29	30	31	32	33	34	35	36	37	38	39	40	41	42	43	44	45	46
Ground	A	H	A	H	H	A	H	A	H	A	H	A	H	H	A	A	H	A	A	H	H	A	A	H	A	A	H	A	H	A	H	H	A	A	H	A	H	H	A	H	A	H	H	A	H	A
Result	L	W	L	L	D	L	D	D	L	D	W	D	D	D	L	L	L	L	D	L	L	L	L	W	W	D	W	L	W	W	W	L	D	D	W	L	W	W	L	W	L	D	W	D	L	W
Position	20	12	18	20	20	21	21	22	22	20	18	19	18	19	20	20	22	23	23	23	24	24	24	24	23	23	23	23	21	20	20	20	20	21	19	20	19	16	19	19	19	18	17	15	18	17

Updated to match(es) played on 8 May 2023. Source: [ Soccerway]
A = Away; H = Home; W = Win; D = Draw; L = Loss; P = Postponed

==== Matches ====
Win Draw Loss Fixtures

On 23 June, the league fixtures were announced.

30 July 2022 1	AFC Wimbledon	2–0	Gillingham	Wimbledon
15:00 BST	Nightingale (yellow card) 9'; Chislett 15'; Marsh (yellow card) 47'; Maghoma (yellow card) 63'; Currie 71'	Report	Ehmer (yellow card) 35'; Lee (yellow card) 47'; Reeves (yellow card) 57'; Wright (yellow card) 67'; Kashket (yellow card) 81'	Stadium: Cherry Red Records Stadium; Attendance: 7,752; Referee: Simon Mather

6 August 2022 2	Gillingham	1–0	Rochdale	Gillingham
15:00 BST	Kashket 9'; Ehmer (yellow card) 21'; Wright (yellow card) 39'; Law (yellow card) 88'	Report	Odoh (yellow card) 88'	Stadium: Priestfield Stadium; Attendance: 4,233; Referee: Will Finnie

13 August 2022 3	Tranmere Rovers	3–0	Gillingham	Birkenhead
15:00 BST	Nevitt 18'; Bristow 67'; Dacres-Cogley 75'	Report	Baggott (yellow card) 54'; MacDonald (yellow card) 81'	Stadium: Prenton Park; Referee: Scott Oldham

16 August 2022 4	Gillingham	0–2	Harrogate Town	Gillingham
19:45 BST	Adelakun (yellow card) 45'; Wright (yellow card) 52'; Baggott (yellow card) 69'; Reeves (yellow card) 71'; Lee (yellow card) 87'	Report	Mattock (yellow card) 5'; Daly 26'; Pattison (yellow card) 34', (goal) 86'; Ramsay (yellow card) 85'	Stadium: Priestfield Stadium; Attendance: 3,931; Referee: Lee Swabey

20 August 2022 5	Gillingham	0–0	Walsall	Gillingham
15:00 BST		Report	Maher (yellow card) 46'; Johnson (yellow card) 80'; Daniels (yellow card) 90+1'; White (yellow card) 90+4'	Stadium: MEMS Priestfield Stadium; Referee: Bobby Madley

27 August 2022 6	Carlisle United	1–0	Gillingham	Carlisle
15:00 BST	Mellish 55'; Gibson (yellow card) 70'	Report	Tutonda (yellow card) 29'; O'Keefe (yellow card) 70'	Stadium: Brunton Park; Attendance: 5,261; Referee: Marc Edwards

3 September 2022 7	Gillingham	0–0	Swindon Town	Gillingham
15:00 BST	Mnoga (yellow card) 6' (yellow-red card) 10'	Report	Williams (yellow card) 55'	Stadium: MEMS Priestfield Stadium; Attendance: 4,927; Referee: Martin Woods

10 September 2022	Crawley Town	Postponed	Gillingham	Crawley
15:00 BST				Stadium: The People's Pension Stadium
Note: Fixture was postponed as a mark of respect following the passing of Queen Elizabeth II.

13 September 2022 8	Grimsby Town	1–1	Gillingham	Cleethorpes
19:45 BST	Taylor 7'; Holohan (yellow card) 90'	Report	Mandron 14', (yellow card) 86'; Adelakun (yellow card) 78'	Stadium: Blundell Park; Attendance: 5,960; Referee: Andy Haines

17 September 2022 9	Gillingham	0–2	Mansfield Town	Gillingham
15:00 BST	Gbode (yellow card) 78'	Report	Akins 17', (penalty missed) 29'; Lapslie 33'; Harbottle (yellow card) 66'	Stadium: MEMS Priestfield Stadium; Attendance: 4,195; Referee: Tom Reeves

24 September 2022 10	Hartlepool United	0–0	Gillingham	Hartlepool
15:00 BST	Umerah (yellow card) 45'	Report	Wright (yellow card) 19'; O'Keefe (yellow card) 36'; Ehmer (yellow card) 89'	Stadium: Suit Direct Stadium; Attendance: 4,298; Referee: Neil Hair

1 October 2022 11	Gillingham	1–0	Sutton United	Gillingham
15:00 BST	MacDonald 90+1'	Report	John (yellow card) 58'; Eastmond (yellow card) 74'	Stadium: MEMS Priestfield Stadium; Attendance: 4,153; Referee: David Rock

8 October 2022 12	Crewe Alexandra	1–1	Gillingham	Crewe
15:00 BST	Agyei 19'; Adebisi (yellow card) 21'; Tabiner (yellow card) 90+2'	Report	Kashket 12'	Stadium: Mornflake Stadium; Attendance: 3,809; Referee: Bobby Madden

15 October 2022 13	Gillingham	1–1	Stevenage	Gillingham
15:00 BST	Baggott 40'; Adelakun (yellow card) 59'	Report	Rose 28' (yellow card) 39'; Roberts (yellow card) 55'; Earley (yellow card) 68'	Stadium: MEMS Priestfield Stadium; Attendance: 5,031; Referee: Ross Joyce

22 October 2022 14	Gillingham	1–1	Barrow	Gillingham
15:00 BST	Baggott 74'	Report	Kay 35'	Stadium: MEMS Priestfield Stadium; Attendance: 5,034

25 October 2022 15	Leyton Orient	2–0	Gillingham	Leyton
19:45 BST	Smyth 52'; Brown (yellow card) 55'; Happe (yellow card) 72'; Sotiriou 73'	Report	Jefferies (yellow card) 81'	Stadium: Breyer Group Stadium; Attendance: 7,099; Referee: Charles Breakspear

29 October 2022 16	Doncaster Rovers	1–0	Gillingham	Doncaster
15:00 BST	Maxwell (yellow card) 9'; Biggins 60'	Report	Law (yellow card) 62'; O'Keefe (yellow card) 84'	Stadium: Eco-Power Stadium; Attendance: 5,800; Referee: Christopher Pollard

12 November 2022 17	Gillingham	0–2	Northampton Town	Gillingham
15:00 GMT		Report	Hoskins 27' (yellow card) 90+2'; McGowan (yellow card) 58'; Bowie 72'	Stadium: MEMS Priestfield Stadium; Attendance: 4,509; Referee: Declan Bourne

19 November 2022 18	Newport County	2–0	Gillingham	Newport
15:00 GMT	Farquharson 43', 56'; Waite (yellow card) 72'; Moriah-Welsh (yellow card) 90+5'	Report	Mandron (yellow card) 15'; Alexander (yellow card) 22'; Walker (yellow card) 66'	Stadium: Rodney Parade; Attendance: 4,300; Referee: Ollie Yates

22 November 2022 19	Crawley Town	0–0	Gillingham	Crawley
19:45 GMT		Report	Ehmer (yellow card) 18'; Gbode (yellow card) 20'	Stadium: Broadfield Stadium; Attendance: 3,284; Referee: James Oldham

3 December 2022 20	Gillingham	0–3	Salford City	Gillingham
15:00 GMT	Reeves (yellow card) 53'	Report	Vassell 54'; Watson 61'; Hendry 75'	Stadium: MEMS Priestfield Stadium; Attendance: 3,854; Referee: Paul Howard

11 December 2022	Gillingham	Postponed	Bradford City	Gillingham
14:00 GMT				Stadium: MEMS Priestfield Stadium
Note: Fixture was postponed due to a frozen pitch.

17 December 2022	Stockport County	Postponed	Gillingham	Edgeley
15:00 GMT				Stadium: Edgeley Park
Note: Fixture was postponed due to a frozen pitch.

26 December 2022 21	Gillingham	0–1	Colchester United	Gillingham
15:00 GMT	Ehmer (yellow card) 45+2'; Tutonda (yellow card) 68'; Kashket (yellow card) 90+10'	Report	Tchamadeu 26'; Tovide (yellow card) 45+2'	Stadium: Priestfield; Attendance: 4,962; Referee: Sam Purkiss

29 December 2022 22	Sutton United	2–1	Gillingham	Sutton
19:45 GMT	Baggott 43' (o.g.); Eastmond (yellow card) 54', (goal) 90+3'; Bugiel (yellow card) 71'	Report	Jefferies (yellow card) 14'; McKenzie 78'	Stadium: VBS Community Stadium; Attendance: 3,316; Referee: Thomas Parsons

2 January 2023 23	Stevenage	1–0	Gillingham	Stevenage
15:00 GMT	Piergianni 23'; Sweeney (yellow card) 34'; Gilbey (yellow card) 64'; Rose (yellow card) 88'	Report	Wright (yellow card) 37'	Stadium: The Lamex Stadium; Attendance: 3,703; Referee: Sunny Gill

14 January 2023 24	Gillingham	2–0	Hartlepool United	Gillingham
15:00 GMT	Nichols 40'; Jefferies 59'; Dieng (yellow card) 72'	Report	Dolan (yellow card) 19'; Tumilty (yellow card) 38'	Stadium: Priestfield; Attendance: 6,003; Referee: Robert Lewis

21 January 2023 25	Colchester United	0–2	Gillingham	Colchester
15:00 GMT	Akinde (yellow card) 61'	Report	Williams (yellow card) 27'; Tutonda 36', (yellow card) 68'; Nichols 45+3'	Stadium: JobServe Community Stadium; Attendance: 5,435; Referee: Alan Young

28 January 2023 26	Swindon Town	3–3	Gillingham	Swindon
15:00 GMT	Williams 1'; Khan (yellow card) 41' (yellow-red card) 81'; Austin 57' (pen.), 78'; Brennan (yellow card) 69'	Report	Dieng 3', (yellow card) 24'; Wright 9' (pen.); Nichols 13', (yellow card) 44'	Stadium: The County Ground; Attendance: 10,259; Referee: Paul Howard

4 February 2023 27	Gillingham	1–0	Crawley Town	Gillingham
15:00 GMT	Williams 48'	Report		Stadium: MEMS Priestfield Stadium; Attendance: 9,317; Referee: Lewis Smith

11 February 2023 28	Mansfield Town	2–0	Gillingham	Mansfield
15:00 GMT	Clarke 21'; Akins 35' (pen.); Keillor-Dunn (yellow card) 62'; Maris (yellow card) 80'	Report	Tutonda (yellow card) 19'; Ehmer (yellow card) 34'; Lapslie (yellow card) 68'	Stadium: One Call Stadium; Attendance: 6,937; Referee: Thomas Kirk

14 February 2023 29	Gillingham	2–1	Grimsby Town	Gillingham
19:45 GMT	Lapslie 56'; MacDonald (yellow card) 70'; Hawkins 87'	Report	Glennon (yellow card) 19'; Holohan 75', (yellow card) 90+1'; Waterfall (yellow card) 90+4'	Stadium: MEMS Priestfield Stadium; Attendance: 5,097; Referee: Craig Hicks

18 February 2023 30	Rochdale	0–2	Gillingham	Rochdale
15:00 GMT	Keohane (yellow card) 47'; Ebanks-Landell (yellow card) 50'	Report	Hawkins 23'; Lapslie 75'	Stadium: Crown Oil Arena; Attendance: 2,742; Referee: Marc Edwards

25 February 2023 31	Gillingham	2–1	AFC Wimbledon	Gillingham
15:00 GMT	Masterson (yellow card) 6'; Ehmer 58'; Alexander 66'	Report	Woodyard (yellow card) 45+5'; Al-Hamadi 52'; Pell (yellow card) 62'; Gunter (yellow card) 65'; McAteer (yellow card) 75'; Marsh (yellow card) 90+4'	Stadium: MEMS Priestfield Stadium; Attendance: 7,453 (913 away supporters); Referee: Neil Hair

28 February 2023 32	Gillingham	0–2	Bradford City	Gillingham
19:45 GMT	Tutonda (yellow card) 66'; Lapslie (yellow card) 90+4'	Report	Smallwood 27'; Cook 49'; Platt (yellow card) 52'	Stadium: MEMS Priestfield Stadium; Attendance: 6,276 (363 away supporters); Referee: Alan Young

5 March 2023 33	Harrogate Town	0–0	Gillingham	Harrogate
15:00 GMT		Report	Hawkins (yellow card) 67'; Dieng (yellow card) 89'	Stadium: The EnviroVent Stadium; Attendance: 2,610; Referee: Andy Haines

7 March 2023 34	Stockport County	0–0	Gillingham	Edgeley
19:45 GMT		Report	Tutonda (yellow card) 77'	Stadium: Edgeley Park; Attendance: 8,168; Referee: Ben Toner

11 March 2023 35	Gillingham	2–0	Tranmere Rovers	Gillingham
15:00 GMT	Williams 32'; Masterson 83'	Report	Hendry (yellow card) 90+1'	Stadium: MEMS Priestfield Stadium; Attendance: 5,674 (267 away); Referee: Andy Woolmer

18 March 2023 36	Walsall	2–0	Gillingham	Bescot
15:00 GMT	Hutchinson 50', (yellow card) 90+2'; Comley (yellow card) 90+5'; Wilkinson 90+5'	Report	O'Brien (yellow card) 30'	Stadium: Poundland Bescot Stadium; Attendance: 6,709; Referee: Sunny Singh Gill

21 March 2023 37	Gillingham	2–1	Crewe Alexandra	Gillingham
19:45 GMT	MacDonald (yellow card) 11'; Nichols 57'; O'Brien 70'; Ehmer (yellow card) 90+5'	Report	Griffiths (yellow card) 42'; Ainley 62'	Stadium: MEMS Priestfield Stadium; Attendance: 5,796; Referee: James Oldham

25 March 2023 38	Gillingham	1–0	Carlisle United	Gillingham
15:00 GMT	MacDonald (yellow card) 45+3'; Hawkins (yellow card) 75'; Williams 90+4'	Report	Garner (yellow card) 45+3'; Moxon (yellow card) 58'; Barclay (yellow card) 87'; Feeney (yellow card) 90+1'; Dennis (yellow card) 90+2'	Stadium: MEMS Priestfield Stadium; Attendance: 6,110 (475 away supporters); Referee: Charles Breakspear

1 April 2023 39	Barrow	2–1	Gillingham	Barrow-in-Furness
15:00 BST	Morris 9' (o.g.); Neal (yellow card) 15'; Kay (yellow card) 66'; Gotts 90+4'}	Report	O'Brien (yellow card) 45+2'; Masterson 82'; Nichols (yellow card) 87'	Stadium: So Legal Stadium; Attendance: 3,703 (320 Gillingham supporters); Referee: Darren Handley

7 April 2023 40	Gillingham	1–0	Doncaster Rovers	Gillingham
15:00 BST	Nichols 44'	Report	Barlow (yellow card) 88'	Stadium: MEMS Priestfield Stadium; Attendance: 6,842 (192 away supporters); Referee: Dean Whitestone

10 April 2023 41	Northampton Town	2–1	Gillingham	Northampton
15:00 BST	Appéré 32'; Norman Jr. (yellow card) 71'; Hondermarck 82'	Report	O'Brien 63'; Coleman (yellow card) 90+1'	Stadium: Sixfields Stadium; Attendance: 6,904 (847 Gillingham supporters); Referee: Darren Drysdale

15 April 2023 42	Gillingham	1–1	Stockport County	Gillingham
15:00 BST	Masterson (yellow card) 16'; Ehmer (yellow card) 23'; Lapslie 54'; Alexander (yellow card) 84'; Dieng (yellow card) 87'	Report	Collar 89'; Knoyle (yellow card) 90'	Stadium: MEMS Priestfield Stadium; Attendance: 5,810 (519 visiting supporters); Referee: Martin Woods

18 April 2023 43	Gillingham	2–0	Leyton Orient	Gillingham
19:45 BST	MacDonald 16'; Ehmer (yellow card) 32'; Alexander 76' (pen.)	Report	Beckles (red card) 14'; Pratley (yellow card) 21'; Smyth (yellow card) 26'; Hunt (yellow card) 45+3'; Turns (yellow card) 73'; Richie Wellens (yellow card) off the pitch'	Stadium: MEMS Priestfield Stadium; Attendance: 6,629 (1,651 away supporters); Referee: Carl Brook

22 April 2023 44	Bradford City	2–2	Gillingham	Bradford
15:00 BST	Cook 48', 84' (pen.); Stubbs (yellow card) 90+9'	Report	Dieng 12'; Lapslie (yellow card) 45+1'; Coleman (yellow card) 53'; Nichols (yellow card) 83'; Hawkins 90+7'	Stadium: University of Bradford Stadium; Attendance: 18,501 (353 Gillingham supporters); Referee: Benjamin Speedie

29 April 2023 45	Gillingham	1–2	Newport County	Gillingham
15:00 BST	Nichols 17' (pen.)	Report	Norman 9'; Bogle 78'	Stadium: MEMS Priestfield Stadium; Attendance: 7,872 (419 away supporters); Referee: Craig Hicks

8 May 2023 46	Salford City	0–1	Gillingham	Salford
15:00 BST	Mallan (yellow card) 86'; Watt (yellow card) 87'	Report	Ehmer (yellow card) 11'; Tutonda (yellow card) 61'; Alexander 84' (pen.)	Stadium: Moor Lane; Attendance: 3,519; Referee: Rebecca Welch

=== FA Cup ===
Gillingham were drawn away to AFC Fylde in the first round, to Dagenham & Redbridge in the second round and at home to Leicester City in the third round.

Win Draw Loss Fixtures

5 November 2022 First round	AFC Fylde	1–1	Gillingham	Medlar-with-Wesham
15:00 BST	Bird (yellow card) 45+2'; Walker 83'	Report	O'Keefe (yellow card) 5'; Mandron 45+3'	Stadium: Mill Farm; Attendance: 996; Referee: Tom Reeves

15 November 2022 First round replay	Gillingham	1–0	AFC Fylde	Gillingham
19:45 GMT	Williams (yellow card) 2'; Kashket (penalty missed) 10'; Walker 43'; Baggott (yellow card) 48'	Report	Whitmore (yellow card) 10'	Stadium: MEMS Priestfield Stadium; Attendance: 1,932; Referee: Will Finnie

26 November 2022 Second round	Dagenham & Redbridge	1–1	Gillingham	Dagenham
17:00 GMT	Walker 80'	Report	Wright (yellow card) 61'; Kashket 90+2'	Stadium: Victoria Road; Attendance: 1,702; Referee: Darren Drysdale

8 December 2022 Second round replay	Gillingham	3–2	Dagenham & Redbridge	Gillingham
19:15 GMT	Tutonda (yellow card) 21'; Baggott 26'; Ehmer 77'; Jefferies (yellow card) 89'; Adelakun 90+5'	Report	Robinson 15'; Phipps (red card) 79'; Saunders 84'	Stadium: MEMS Priestfield Stadium; Attendance: 1,533; Referee: Thomas Kirk

7 January 2023 Third round	Gillingham	0–1	Leicester City	Gillingham
12:30 GMT		Report	Iheanacho 56'	Stadium: Priestfield; Attendance: 8,567; Referee: Sam Barrott

=== EFL Cup ===
Win Draw Loss Fixtures

Gills were drawn away to AFC Wimbledon in the first round and at home to Exeter City in the second round. An away tie against Wolverhampton Wanderers was drawn for the fourth round.

9 August 2022 First round	AFC Wimbledon	0–2	Gillingham	Wimbledon
19:45 BST	Assal (yellow card) 62'	Report	Ehmer (yellow card) 43'; Reeves (yellow card) 69'; Green (yellow card) 81', (goal) 90+2'; Mandron 90'	Stadium: The Cherry Red Records Stadium; Attendance: 3,008; Referee: Craig Hicks

23 August 2022 Second round	Gillingham	0–0 (6–5 p)	Exeter City	Gillingham
19:45 BST	Ehmer (yellow card) 13'	Report	Sweeney (yellow card) 20'; Stubbs (yellow card) 81'	Stadium: MEMS Priestfield Stadium; Attendance: 2,127; Referee: Carl Brook
	Penalties
	Lee (penalty scored); Mandron (penalty scored); Wright (penalty scored); Reeves (penalty scored); Adelakun (penalty scored); Tutonda (penalty scored)		Brown (penalty scored); Cox (penalty scored); Caprice (penalty scored); Collins (penalty scored); Coley (penalty scored); Key (penalty missed)

8 November 2022 Third round	Brentford	1–1 (5–6 p)	Gillingham	Brentford
19:45 GMT	Toney 3'	Report	Jefferies (yellow card) 5'; Mandron 75'	Stadium: Gtech Community Stadium; Attendance: 16,278; Referee: Tim Robinson
	Penalties
	Toney (penalty scored); Ghoddos (penalty scored); Dasilva (penalty scored); Mbeumo (penalty scored); Jensen (penalty scored); Damsgaard (penalty missed)		Mandron (penalty scored); Adelakun (penalty scored); Wright (penalty scored); Alexander (penalty scored); Kashket (penalty scored); MacDonald (penalty scored)

20 December 2022 Fourth round	Wolverhampton Wanderers	2–0	Gillingham	Wolverhampton
19:45 GMT	Jiménez 77' (pen.); Aït-Nouri 90+1'	Report		Stadium: Molineux; Attendance: 26,943; Referee: Michael Salisbury

=== EFL Trophy ===
On 21 June, the initial group stage draw was made, grouping Gillingham with Charlton Athletic and Colchester United. Three days later, Brighton & Hove Albion U21s joined Southern Group A.

Pos	Div	Team	Pld	W	PW	PL	L	GF	GA	GD	Pts	Qualification
1	L2	Colchester United	3	2	0	1	0	5	3	+2	7	Advance to Round 2
2	L1	Charlton Athletic	3	2	0	0	1	6	3	+3	6	Advance to Round 2
3	L2	Gillingham	3	1	1	0	1	4	6	−2	5	
4	ACA	Brighton & Hove Albion U21	3	0	0	0	3	4	7	−3	0	

Source: EFL.com

Win Draw Loss Fixtures

31 August 2022 Group stage	Charlton Athletic	3–0	Gillingham	Charlton
19:00 BST	Walker 15' (o.g.); Henry 52', (yellow card) 54'; Leaburn 59'; Dench (yellow card) 75'	Report		Stadium: The Valley; Attendance: 1,888; Referee: Sunny Gill

4 October 2022 Group stage	Gillingham	3–2	Brighton & Hove Albion U21	Gillingham
19:00 BST	Walker 19' 71'; Wright 76'	Report	Ferguson 31'; Miller 63'; Tsoungui (yellow card) 81'	Stadium: MEMS Priestfield Stadium; Attendance: 838; Referee: Sam Purkiss

11 October 2022 Group stage	Gillingham	1–1 (5–4 p)	Colchester United	Gillingham
19:45 BST	Baggott (yellow card) 16'; Walker 43' (yellow card) 65'; Kashket (yellow card) 60'; Jefferies (yellow card) 77'	Report	Lubala (yellow card) 23'; Akinde 45'	Stadium: MEMS Priestfield Stadium; Attendance: 828; Referee: Sam Allison
	Penalties
	Walker (penalty scored); Adelakun (penalty scored); Wright (penalty scored); Kashket (penalty scored); Chambers (penalty missed); Green (penalty scored)		Longstaff (penalty scored); Nouble (penalty missed); Newby (penalty scored); Tchamadeu (penalty scored); Chilvers (penalty scored); Marshall-Miranda (penalty missed)
