= Josh Chambers =

English footballer (born 2003)

Personal information
- Date of birth: 13 November 2003 (age 23)
- Place of birth: London, England
- Position: Midfielder

Team information
- Current team: Sheppey United

Youth career
- Gillingham

Senior career*
Years	Team	Apps	(Gls)
2022–2024	Gillingham	3	(0)
2022–2023	→ Worthing (loan)	26	(3)
2023–2024	→ Welling United (loan)	9	(1)
2024	→ Worthing (loan)	3	(0)
2024	Folkestone Invicta	4	(0)
2025	Chatham Town	2	(0)
2025	Sheppey United	3	(0)
2026	Ashford United	5	(0)
2026–	Sheppey United	0	(0)
- * Club domestic league appearances and goals as of 10:00, 27 May 2026 (UTC)

Josh Chambers (born 13 November 2003) is an English professional footballer who plays as a midfielder for Isthmian League South East Division club Sheppey United.

== Career ==
Chambers was a second-year scholar when he was involved with the Gillingham first-team in February 2022, becoming the fifth youngest player in the club's history to be named in a first-team squad. He made his EFL League One debut on 12 March, after coming on as a 75th-minute substitute for Charlie Kelman in a 1–0 win at Doncaster Rovers. He won his first start on 2 April, in a 1–0 defeat at Sunderland; manager Neil Harris said that "he's got real personality and character. That's why I played him".

He appeared to have left the club after rejecting a new contract offer and trialling with Tottenham Hotspur at the end of the 2021–22 season. However, he eventually signed a new contract in September 2022.

On 6 November 2022, he joined Worthing of the National League South on a short-term loan deal. He impressed manager Adam Hinshelwood, who said he would and try to extend the teenager's loan deal. In January 2023, it was confirmed that Gillingham had agreed to extend his loan until the conclusion of the 2022–23 season. After 26 appearances and three goals for Worthing, Gillingham recalled Chambers from his loan on 20 April 2023.

On 11 November 2023 Chambers joined National League South side Welling United on loan for an initial period of one month, making his league debut for the side in a 4–3 win over Slough Town the same day.

On 22 March 2024 Chambers re-joined Worthing on loan until the end of the 2023–24 season.

On 6 August 2024, Chambers signed for Isthmian League Premier Division side Folkestone Invicta following his departure from Gillingham. He was released by the club on 18 September 2024 after just five appearances. On 10 January 2025, Isthmian League Premier Division side Chatham Town announced that Chambers had signed for them, before he joined Sheppey United the following month.

After being ruled out due to injury for over a year due to a double hernia injury, he joined Ashford United in January 2026, before returning to Sheppey United in May 2026.

== Career statistics ==
As of end of 2025–26 season

Appearances and goals by club, season and competition
Club	Season	League			FA Cup		EFL Cup		Other		Total	
Club	Season	Division	Apps	Goals	Apps	Goals	Apps	Goals	Apps	Goals	Apps	Goals
Gillingham	2021–22	League One	2	0	0	0	0	0	0	0	2	0
Gillingham	2022–23	League Two	1	0	0	0	0	0	2 (Note: Appearances in EFL Trophy)	0	3	0
Gillingham	2023–24	League Two	0	0	0	0	0	0	3	0	3	0
Gillingham	Total		3	0	0	0	0	0	5	0	8	0
Worthing (loan)	2022–23	National League South	26	3	0	0	—		2 (Note: Appearances in FA Trophy)	0	28	3
Welling United (loan)	2023–24	National League South	9	1	0	0	—		2	0	11	1
Worthing (loan)	2023–24	National League South	3	0	—		—		0	0	3	0
Folkestone Invicta	2024–25	Isthmian League Premier Division	4	0	1	0	—		0	0	5	0
Chatham Town	2024–25	Isthmian League Premier Division	2	0	—		—		0	0	2	0
Sheppey United	2024–25	Isthmian League South East Division	3	0	—		—		0	0	3	0
Ashford United	2025–26	Isthmian League South East Division	5	0	0	0	—		0	0	5	0
Career total			55	4	1	0	0	0	9	0	65	4
