= Bailey Akehurst =

English footballer (born 2003)

Personal information
- Full name: Bailey Roy Akehurst
- Date of birth: 8 September 2003 (age 23)
- Place of birth: Kent
- Height: 5 ft 10 in (1.78 m)
- Position: Defender

Team information
- Current team: Tonbridge Angels

Youth career
- –2021: Gillingham

Senior career*
Years	Team	Apps	(Gls)
2021–2023	Gillingham	5	(0)
2021	→ Cray Wanderers (loan)	2	(0)
2022	→ Hastings United (loan)	1	(0)
2022	→ Cheshunt (loan)	0	(0)
2022	→ Cray Wanderers (loan)	5	(0)
2023	→ Tonbridge Angels (loan)	3	(0)
2023	Hastings United	10	(0)
2023	Erith & Belvedere	3	(0)
2023–2024	Dover Athletic	16	(0)
2024	Chatham Town	12	(0)
2024	Herne Bay	3	(0)
2025–	Tonbridge Angels	2	(0)
- * Club domestic league appearances and goals as of 19:19, 15 January 2025 (UTC)

Bailey Roy Akehurst (born 9 October 2003) is an English professional footballer who plays as a left back for National League South club Tonbridge Angels.

== Career ==
Despite being a second-year scholar, Akehurst made his league debut for Gillingham in a 1–1 draw with Sheffield Wednesday on 13 September 2021, having made his first senior appearance in an EFL Trophy match against Crawley Town earlier in the season.

On 7 June 2022 he signed his first professional contract with the Kent side. Shortly into the 2022–23 season, he signed for Hastings United on loan. He was released at the end of the 2022–23 season.

Following his release from Gillingham, Akehurst returned to Hastings United on a permanent basis. In November 2023, he joined National League South club Dover Athletic following a short spell with Erith & Belvedere. He was offered a new contract by Dover following relegation at the end of the 2023–24 season.

In June 2024, Akehurst joined Isthmian League Premier Division club Chatham Town. In January 2025, following a short spell with Herne Bay, he returned to Tonbridge Angels on a permanent basis.

== Career statistics ==
As of match played 17 December 2024

Appearances and goals by club, season and competition
Club	Season	League			FA Cup		EFL Cup		Other		Total	
Club	Season	Division	Apps	Goals	Apps	Goals	Apps	Goals	Apps	Goals	Apps	Goals
Gillingham	2021–22	League One	5	0	2	0	2	0	2 (Note: Appearance(s) in EFL Trophy)	0	11	0
Cheshunt	2022-23	National League South	0	0	0	0	0	0	1 (Note: Appearance(s) in FA Trophy)	0	1	0
Cray Wanderers (loan)	2022–23	Isthmian League Premier Division	5	0	—		—		0	0	5	0
Hastings United	2023–24	Isthmian League Premier Division	10	0	3	1	—		1	0	14	1
Erith & Belvedere	2023–24	Isthmian League South East Division	3	0	0	0	—		0	0	3	0
Dover Athletic	2023–24	National League South	16	0	0	0	—		0	0	16	0
Chatham Town	2024–25	Isthmian League Premier Division	12	0	3	1	—		4 (Note: One appearance in Kent Senior Cup, two appearances in FA Trophy, one appearance in Alan Turvey Trophy)	0	19	1
Herne Bay	2024–25	Isthmian League South East Division	3	0	0	0	—		0	0	3	0
Career total			54	0	8	2	2	0	8	0	72	2
