= Joe Gbodé =

English footballer (born 2005)

Personal information
- Full name: Joseph Paul Caleb Gbodé
- Date of birth: 8 April 2005 (age 21)
- Place of birth: Southwark, England
- Height: 1.80 m (5 ft 11 in)
- Position: Forward

Team information
- Current team: Shrewsbury Town (on loan from Luton Town)
- Number: 27

Youth career
- –2021: Gillingham

Senior career*
Years	Team	Apps	(Gls)
2021–2025	Gillingham	47	(4)
2022	→ Margate (loan)	4	(0)
2022	→ Folkestone Invicta (loan)	1	(0)
2022	→ Hastings United (loan)	9	(7)
2023	→ Maidstone United (loan)	3	(0)
2023	→ Aveley (loan)	9	(0)
2025–	Luton Town	5	(0)
2026	→ Woking (loan)	15	(3)
2026–	→ Shrewsbury Town (loan)	7	(0)
- * Club domestic league appearances and goals as of 20:37, 25 October 2026 (UTC)

Joseph Paul Caleb Gbodé (born 8 April 2005) is an English professional footballer who plays as a forward for EFL League Two club Shrewsbury Town, on loan from EFL League One club Luton Town.

== Career ==
=== Gillingham ===
Gbodé first joined Gillingham's academy in the under 15 age group.

He made his first-team debut for Gillingham on 16 November 2021, coming on as a 62nd-minute substitute for Ben Reeves in a 1–0 defeat at Cheltenham Town in the FA Cup. He made his league debut four days later, appearing as an 83rd-minute substitute in a 2–0 away defeat to Crewe Alexandra.

On 4 February 2022, he joined Margate on a one-month loan deal. On 24 March 2022, he joined Folkestone Invicta on loan, alongside Gillingham teammates Sam Gale and Alex Giles. He joined Hastings United on dual-registration terms at the start of the 2022–23 season.

On 4 October 2023, he joined Maidstone United on a one month loan.

Having been recalled from Maidstone following the appointment of Stephen Clemence as Gillingham manager, on 2 December 2023 he went on an initial one-month loan to Aveley of the National League South. Gbode's loan with the Essex side was cut short by Gillingham on 22 February 2024 after the club was hit by a number of injuries in forward positions. In September of the same year, Gillingham announced that Gbodé had signed a new contract running until the end of the 2026–27 season, with the option of a further year.

=== Luton Town ===
Gbodé signed for League One club Luton Town for an undisclosed fee on 1 September 2025. Gbodé made his debut for the team on 13 September, coming on as a substitute for Zack Nelson in a 3–2 home defeat against Plymouth Argyle. On 21 January 2026, he joined National League side Woking on loan until the end of the season. Ahead of the 2026–27 season, he joined League Two side Shrewsbury Town on a season-long loan.

== Career statistics ==
As of match played 10 October 2026

Appearances and goals by club, season and competition
Club	Season	League			FA Cup		EFL Cup		Other		Total	
Club	Season	Division	Apps	Goals	Apps	Goals	Apps	Goals	Apps	Goals	Apps	Goals
Gillingham	2021–22	League One	2	0	1	0	0	0	0	0	3	0
Gillingham	2022–23	League Two	4	0	1	0	0	0	1 (Note: Appearance(s) in the EFL Trophy)	0	6	0
Gillingham	2023–24	League Two	3	0	0	0	1	0	1	0	5	0
Gillingham	2024–25	League Two	34	3	1	0	1	0	3	0	39	3
Gillingham	2025–26	League Two	4	1	0	0	1	0	0	0	5	1
Gillingham	Total		47	4	3	0	3	0	5	0	58	4
Margate (loan)	2021–22	Isthmian League; Premier Division	4	0	0	0	–		1 (Note: Appearance(s) in the Alan Turvey Trophy)	0	5	0
Folkestone Invicta (loan)	2021–22	Isthmian League; Premier Division	1	0	0	0	–		2 (Note: Appearance(s) in the Kent Senior Cup)	0	3	0
Hastings United (loan)	2022–23	Isthmian League; Premier Division	9	7	0	0	–		3 (Note: 2 appearances in the Sussex Senior Challenge Cup and 1 appearance in the FA Trophy)	3	12	10
Aveley (loan)	2023–24	National League South	9	0	0	0	–		4 (Note: 3 appearances in the FA Trophy and 1 in the Essex Senior Cup)	1	13	1
Luton Town	2025–26	League One	5	0	0	0	–		3	0	8	0
Luton Town	2026–27	League One	0	0	0	0	0	0	0	0	0	0
Luton Town	Total		5	0	0	0	0	0	3	0	8	0
Woking (loan)	2025–26	National League	15	3	0	0	–		1 (Note: Appearance(s) in the FA Trophy)	1	16	4
Shrewsbury Town (loan)	2026–27	League Two	7	0	0	0	2	0	2	0	11	0
Career total			97	14	3	0	5	0	21	5	126	19
