= Jake Turner (footballer) =

English footballer (born 1999)

Personal information
- Full name: Jake Edward Turner
- Date of birth: 25 February 1999 (age 27)
- Place of birth: Wilmslow, England
- Position: Goalkeeper

Team information
- Current team: Newport County
- Number: 25

Youth career
- Bolton Wanderers

Senior career*
Years	Team	Apps	(Gls)
2017–2019	Bolton Wanderers	0	(0)
2017	→ Stalybridge Celtic (loan)	0	(0)
2018	→ Frickley Athletic (loan)		
2018–2019	→ Stalybridge Celtic (loan)	11	(0)
2019	→ Darlington (loan)	11	(0)
2019–2022	Newcastle United	0	(0)
2020–2021	→ Morecambe (loan)	14	(0)
2021–2022	→ Colchester United (loan)	9	(0)
2022–2026	Gillingham	69	(0)
2025	→ Dagenham & Redbridge (loan)	7	(0)
2026–	Newport County	0	(0)

International career
2016–2017	England U18	2	(0)
2017	England U19	1	(0)
- * Club domestic league appearances and goals as of 20:42, 22 September 2026 (UTC)

Jake Edward Turner (born 25 February 1999) is an English professional footballer who plays as a goalkeeper for EFL League Two club Newport County.

== Early life ==
Turner was born in Wilmslow, and grew up with older sister Millie, who is also a footballer.

== Club career ==
Turner began his career as an outfield player, and was suggested by Rene Meulensteen — who was a personal friend with the Turner family — to try being a goalkeeper due to his size. He spent the next few weeks training as a goalkeeper with Meulensteen and when first playing the position in a Sunday league football match he was spotted by Bolton Wanderers scouts who were impressed with what they saw which lead to Bolton signing him for their academy.

He moved on loan to Stalybridge Celtic in December 2017, but was recalled without making a first-team appearance. He then moved on loan to Frickley Athletic in March 2018. He returned on loan to Stalybridge in August 2018, making 11 league and 1 cup appearances. He moved on loan to Darlington in March 2019.

He signed for Newcastle United in July 2019, saying he was persuaded to do so by former Bolton teammate Sammy Ameobi, who had begun his career at Newcastle. In August 2020 he moved on a season-long loan to Morecambe. He was recalled by Newcastle in January 2021.

On 7 August 2021, he joined League Two club Colchester United on loan until January 2022. He made his club debut on 7 September in Colchester's 1–0 EFL Trophy defeat to Gillingham. He became first-choice goalkeeper after an injury to Shamal George, and was praised by local media for his performances. The loan ended in January 2022.

On 30 June 2022, Turner signed for League Two side Gillingham. Initially a back up to first choice goalkeeper Glenn Morris, Turner made his league debut as a 41st minute substitute in a 0–2 home loss to Northampton Town. Turner was limited to 7 league appearances in his first season with the club, but started the 2023–24 season as Neil Harris' first choice goalkeeper. On 25 March 2025, Turner joined National League side Dagenham & Redbridge on loan for the remainder of the season.

He was released by Gillingham at the end of the 2025–26 season.

On 21 August 2026, Turner joined League Two club Newport County. He made his Newport debut on 22 September 2026 in the EFL Trophy 2–0 win against Swindon Town.

== International career ==
Turner was first called up to the England under-18 team in September 2016 ahead of two fixtures against Sweden. He made his debut in November 2016, keeping a clean sheet in a 0–0 draw with France, a win which helped the Three Lions secure the International Trophy. He made his second and final appearance at this level in a 2–1 friendly win over Qatar under-19s in Doha.

Turner graduated to the England under-19 squad in August 2017, making his only appearance as a 46th minute substitute in a 7–1 win over Poland in September 2017.

== Career statistics ==
As of match played 3 November 2026

Appearances and goals by club, season and competition
Club	Season	League			National cup		League cup		Other		Total	
Club	Season	Division	Apps	Goals	Apps	Goals	Apps	Goals	Apps	Goals	Apps	Goals
Newcastle United U21	2019–20	—	—		—		—		2 (Note: Appearance(s) in the EFL Trophy)	0	2	0
Morecambe (loan)	2020–21	League Two	14	0	2	0	1	0	0	0	17	0
Colchester United (loan)	2021–22	League Two	9	0	1	0	0	0	4	0	14	0
Gillingham	2022–23	League Two	7	0	4	0	4	0	3	0	18	0
Gillingham	2023–24	League Two	37	0	3	0	0	0	0	0	40	0
Gillingham	2024–25	League Two	9	0	0	0	0	0	0	0	9	0
Gillingham	2025–26	League Two	16	0	1	0	1	0	2	0	20	0
Gillingham	Total		69	0	8	0	5	0	5	0	87	0
Dagenham & Redbridge (loan)	2024–25	National League	7	0	0	0	0	0	0	0	7	0
Newport County	2026–27	League Two	0	0	0	0	0	0	2	0	2	0
Career total			99	0	11	0	6	0	13	0	129	0
