= Ike Orji =

English footballer (born 2003)

Personal information
- Full name: Ikechukwu Sunny Smart Orji
- Date of birth: 30 April 2003 (age 23)
- Place of birth: England
- Position: Defender

Team information
- Current team: Dartford

Youth career
- Maidstone United
- Chatham Town

Senior career*
Years	Team	Apps	(Gls)
2019–2023	Chatham Town	71	(2)
2023–2024	Gillingham	1	(0)
2023	→ Chatham Town (loan)	13	(0)
2023	→ Welling United (loan)	4	(0)
2024	→ Hemel Hempstead Town (loan)	6	(0)
2024	Chelmsford City	3	(0)
2024–2025	Cray Wanderers	35	(1)
2025	Billericay Town	7	(0)
2025–2026	Folkestone Invicta	18	(0)
2026–	Dartford	1	(0)
- * Club domestic league appearances and goals as of 17:49, 26 August 2026 (UTC)

Ikechukwu Sunny Smart Orji is an English professional footballer who plays as a defender for Isthmian League Premier Division club Dartford.

== Career ==
Orji began his senior career with Southern Counties East Football League Premier Division club Chatham Town in 2019, following time in the academies at both Maidstone United and Chatham Town. In March 2021, Orji went on trial with League One club Gillingham. He was a part of the Chatham squad that were promoted as runners-up from the 2021–22 SCEFL Premier Division.

In January 2023, Orji attracted interest from League Two clubs Crawley Town and Gillingham, joining the latter on 9 February, returning to Chatham Town on loan until the end of the season. Following his return to the club, he played a key role as the club achieved back-to-back promotions as Isthmian League South East Division Champions.

In October 2023, he made his first-team professional debut for Gillingham, featuring in a 5–1 EFL Trophy defeat to Portsmouth, making his first league appearance eleven days later as a 79th minute substitute in a 1–2 loss to Notts County. On 4 December 2023, he joined National League South club Welling United on an initial one-month loan deal. On 16 March 2024 he joined Hemel Hempstead Town, also of the National League South, on loan.

On 15 May 2024, Gillingham announced he would be released in the summer when his contract expired.

On 7 August 2024, following a successful trial, Orji signed for National League South side Chelmsford City. In September 2024, he joined Cray Wanderers.

On 6 August 2025, Orji joined Isthmian League Premier Division club Billericay Town. In October 2025, he joined divisional rivals Folkestone Invicta. He made eighteen appearances for the club as Folkestone were crowned Isthmian Premier Division champions for the 2025–26 season.

On 21 August 2026, he returned to the Isthmian League Premier Division, joining Dartford.

== Style of play ==
Upon signing for Gillingham, manager Neil Harris described Orji as an "attack-minded wing-back" with "great end product, huge pace and energy", with the Kent Messenger likening Orji's playing style to West Ham United right back Aaron Wan-Bissaka.

== Career statistics ==
As of end of 2025–26 season

Appearances and goals by club, season and competition
Club	Season	League			FA Cup		League Cup		Other		Total	
Club	Season	Division	Apps	Goals	Apps	Goals	Apps	Goals	Apps	Goals	Apps	Goals
Chatham Town	2022–23	Isthmian League South East Division	18	1	3	0	—		1 (Note: Appearance(s) in FA Trophy)	0	22	1
Gillingham	2022–23	League Two	0	0	0	0	0	0	0	0	0	0
Gillingham	2023–24	League Two	1	0	0	0	0	0	1 (Note: Appearance(s) in EFL Trophy)	0	2	0
Gillingham	Total		1	0	0	0	0	0	1	0	2	0
Chatham Town (loan)	2022–23	Isthmian League South East Division	13	0	0	0	—		0	0	13	0
Welling United (loan)	2023–24	National League South	4	0	0	0	—		2	0	6	0
Hemel Hempstead Town (loan)	2023–24	National League South	6	0	—		—		0	0	6	0
Chelmsford City	2024–25	National League South	3	0	0	0	—		0	0	3	0
Cray Wanderers	2024–25	Isthmian League Premier Division	35	1	2	0	—		2 (Note: One appearance in Kent Senior Cup, one appearance in FA Trophy)	0	39	1
Billericay Town	2025–26	Isthmian League Premier Division	7	0	5	0	—		0	0	12	0
Folkestone Invicta	2025–26	Isthmian League Premier Division	18	0	—		—		0	0	18	0
Career total			105	2	10	0	0	0	6	0	121	2

== Honours ==
Folkestone Invicta

- Isthmian League Premier League: 2025–26
