= Lewis Walker (footballer) =

English footballer (born 1999)

Personal information
- Full name: Lewis Jon Walker
- Date of birth: 14 April 1999 (age 27)
- Height: 6 ft 0 in (1.83 m)
- Position: Forward

Team information
- Current team: Kidderminster Harriers
- Number: 9

Youth career
- –2016: Ilkeston

Senior career*
Years	Team	Apps	(Gls)
2015–2016	Ilkeston		
2016–2018	Derby County	0	(0)
2017	→ Darlington (loan)	1	(0)
2018–2020	Queens Park Rangers	4	(0)
2019–2020	→ Aldershot Town (loan)	13	(0)
2020–2021	Como	17	(2)
2021–2022	Athletic Carpi	26	(4)
2022–2024	Gillingham	17	(0)
2023	→ Woking (loan)	4	(1)
2024–2025	Woking	50	(8)
2025–2026	Braintree Town	35	(10)
2026–	Kidderminster Harriers	11	(6)
- * Club domestic league appearances and goals as of 09:36, 12 October 2026 (UTC)

Lewis Jon Walker (born 14 April 1999) is an English professional footballer who plays as a forward for National League club Kidderminster Harriers.

== Club career ==
Walker started his senior career with Ilkeston before signing for Derby County in January 2016. In January 2017, he went on loan to National League North side Darlington.

On 6 November 2018 Walker signed for the Queens Park Rangers Under 23 team after being released by Derby County earlier in the year. On 13 April 2019 Walker was named as a substitute in the 2018–19 EFL Championship game against Swansea City, he replaced Tomer Hemed in the 83rd minute to make his first team and professional debut. QPR went on to win the game 4–0. On 28 November 2019 Walker signed a short-term loan deal with National League side Aldershot Town. In June 2020, he was released at the end of his contract with QPR.

In September 2020, he went on trial with Italian Serie C club Como. Later in the month, he signed a two-year deal with the Italian club.

On 30 September 2021, he joined newly-formed Athletic Carpi in Serie D.

Walker then returned to England, signing for League Two side Gillingham on 29 July 2022. Walker scored his first goals for the Gills when he scored twice in an EFL Trophy win over Brighton & Hove Albion Under-21s on 5 October 2022. On 29 September 2023, Walker agreed to join National League side, Woking on loan until January 2024. On 3 November 2023, prior to Gillingham's FA Cup tie against Hereford, Walker was recalled from his loan at Woking.

On 17 January 2024, Walker returned to Woking on a permanent deal, signing an eighteen-month contract. On 6 May 2025, it was announced that Walker would leave the club upon the expiry of his contract in June. He departed having scored 14 goals in 59 appearances.

In June 2025, Walker joined fellow National League side Braintree Town.

On 17 June 2026, Walker agreed to join newly promoted National League side Kidderminster Harriers, returning to the division following Braintree's relegation the previous season.

== Personal life ==
Walker is the son of former England defender Des Walker and younger brother of former Lincoln City striker Tyler Walker. He is of Jamaican descent through his father.

== Career statistics ==
As of 28 February 2026

Appearances and goals by club, season and competition
Club	Season	League			FA Cup		League Cup		Other		Total	
Club	Season	Division	Apps	Goals	Apps	Goals	Apps	Goals	Apps	Goals	Apps	Goals
Derby County U21	2016–17	—			—		—		2 (Note: Appearances in the EFL Trophy)	0	2	0
Derby County	2016–17	Championship	0	0	0	0	0	0	—		0	0
Derby County	2017–18	Championship	0	0	0	0	0	0	—		0	0
Derby County	Total		0	0	0	0	0	0	—		0	0
Darlington (loan)	2016–17	National League North	1	0	0	0	—		0	0	1	0
Queens Park Rangers	2018–19	Championship	4	0	0	0	0	0	—		4	0
Queens Park Rangers	2019–20	Championship	0	0	0	0	0	0	—		0	0
Queens Park Rangers	Total		4	0	0	0	0	0	—		4	0
Aldershot Town (loan)	2019–20	National League	13	0	0	0	—		1 (Note: Appearance in the FA Trophy)	0	14	0
Como	2020–21	Serie C	19	2	1	0	—		—		20	2
Athletic Carpi	2021–22	Serie D	26	4	0	0	—		—		26	4
Gillingham	2022–23	League Two	17	0	4	1	3	0	3	3	27	4
Gillingham	2023–24	League Two	0	0	1	0	0	0	1	0	2	0
Gillingham	Total		17	0	5	1	3	0	4	3	29	4
Woking (loan)	2023–24	National League	4	1	0	0	—		0	0	4	1
Woking	2023–24	National League	11	3	—		—		—		11	3
Woking	2024–25	National League	39	5	1	0	—		8 (Note: Four appearances and two goals in the National League Cup, four appearances and four goals in the FA Trophy)	6	48	11
Woking	Total		50	8	1	0	—		8	6	59	14
Braintree Town	2025–26	National League	24	5	2	0	—		4 (Note: Three appearances and two goals in the National League Cup, one in the FA Trophy)	0	30	5
Career total			157	19	9	1	3	0	19	9	178	29

== Honours ==
Como

- Serie C winner: 2020–21
