= Shadrach Ogie =

Irish footballer

Personal information
- Full name: Shadrach Nosa Ogie
- Date of birth: 25 August 2001 (age 25)
- Place of birth: Limerick, Ireland
- Position: Defender

Team information
- Current team: Woking
- Number: 6

Youth career
- Pike Rovers
- Hornchurch
- 2018–2019: Leyton Orient

Senior career*
Years	Team	Apps	(Gls)
2019–2023	Leyton Orient	44	(0)
2019	→ Bishop's Stortford (loan)	7	(1)
2020	→ Dover Athletic (loan)	8	(1)
2020–2021	→ Aldershot Town (loan)	29	(1)
2023–2026	Gillingham	84	(1)
2026–	Woking	16	(1)

International career
2019	Republic of Ireland U18	2	(0)
2019	Republic of Ireland U19	1	(0)
- * Club domestic league appearances and goals as of 20:03 22 November 2026 (UTC)

Shadrach Nosa Ogie (born 25 August 2001) is an Irish professional footballer who currently plays as a defender for National League club Woking.

== Club career ==
=== Leyton Orient ===
Born in Limerick, Ireland, Ogie played youth football for local club Pike Rovers. Upon moving to England, Ogie played football in Hornchurch's youth academy, before joining Leyton Orient in 2018.

On 1 February 2019, after receiving international clearance from FIFA allowing him to play competitive football, Ogie signed a professional contract with Leyton Orient. The following day, Ogie made his debut for the club, playing 39 minutes in a 1–0 FA Trophy win against Blyth Spartans. In March 2019, Ogie was loaned out to Isthmian League club Bishop's Stortford, making seven appearances and scoring once.

Following Leyton Orient's promotion back into the English Football League, Ogie's first appearance of the 2019–20 season came in a 2–0 EFL Trophy win against Southend United.

==== Dover Athletic (loan) ====
On 17 January 2020, Ogie joined Dover Athletic on loan. He made his debut for the club in a 0–0 away draw at Notts County and scored his first goal for the club the following week with a superb solo effort in a 2–0 victory over Aldershot Town.

==== Aldershot Town (loan) ====
Ogie joined Aldershot Town on an initial one-month loan deal on 3 October 2020. He made his debut that day as Aldershot lost 2–1 to Hartlepool United. On 4 November 2020, Ogie's loan was extended until the end of the 2020–21 season. He scored his first goal for the Shots on 12 December 2020 in a 3–2 league defeat to Boreham Wood and made it two in two matches the following week with a goal in a 5–1 FA Trophy victory over Welwyn Garden City.

==== Contract extension ====
On 27 January 2022, Ogie signed a contract extension with Leyton Orient, which would have kept him at the club until the end of the 2023–24 season.

=== Gillingham ===
On 18 July 2023, Ogie signed for Gillingham for an undisclosed fee. He made his league debut for the Gills on 5 August 2023 in a 1–0 away win against Stockport County.

He was released by Gillingham at the end of the 2025–26 season.

=== Woking ===
On 25 July 2026, Ogie signed for Woking on a two-year contract as a free agent.

== International career ==
On 21 March 2019, Ogie made his debut for Republic of Ireland under-18's in a 4–0 loss against Turkey U18, a month after making his under-19 debut for Ireland on 5 February 2019.

== Style of play ==
Neil Harris, his former manager at Gillingham, has said of Ogie: "He's competitive, he's quick, aggressive, left footed" and possessing "a good passing range".

== Career statistics ==
As of match played 21 November 2026

Appearances and goals by club, season and competition
Club	Season	League			FA Cup		League Cup		Other		Total	
Club	Season	Division	Apps	Goals	Apps	Goals	Apps	Goals	Apps	Goals	Apps	Goals
Leyton Orient	2018–19	National League	0	0	0	0	—		1 (Note: Appearance(s) in FA Trophy.)	0	1	0
Leyton Orient	2019–20	League Two	0	0	0	0	0	0	3 (Note: Appearance(s) in EFL Trophy.)	0	3	0
Leyton Orient	2020–21	League Two	0	0	0	0	0	0	1	0	1	0
Leyton Orient	2021–22	League Two	34	0	3	0	0	0	2	0	39	0
Leyton Orient	2022–23	League Two	10	0	1	0	1	0	3	0	15	0
Total			44	0	4	0	1	0	10	0	59	0
Bishop's Stortford (loan)	2018–19	Isthmian Premier Division	7	1	—		—		—		7	1
Dover Athletic (loan)	2019–20	National League	8	1	—		—		—		8	1
Aldershot Town (loan)	2020–21	National League	29	1	1	0	—		3	1	33	2
Gillingham
Gillingham	2024–24	League Two	39	1	2	0	2	0	3	0	47	1
Gillingham	2024–25	League Two	34	0	1	0	1	0	3	0	39	0
Gillingham	2025–26	League Two	11	0	0	0	1	0	2	0	14	0
Total			84	1	3	0	4	0	8	0	100	1
Woking	2026–27	National League	16	1	1	0	—		4 (Note: Four appearance(s) in National League Cup)	0	21	1
Career Total			188	5	9	0	5	0	22	1	228	6

== Honours ==
Leyton Orient

- EFL League Two: 2022–23
