= Cheye Alexander =

Saint Lucian footballer

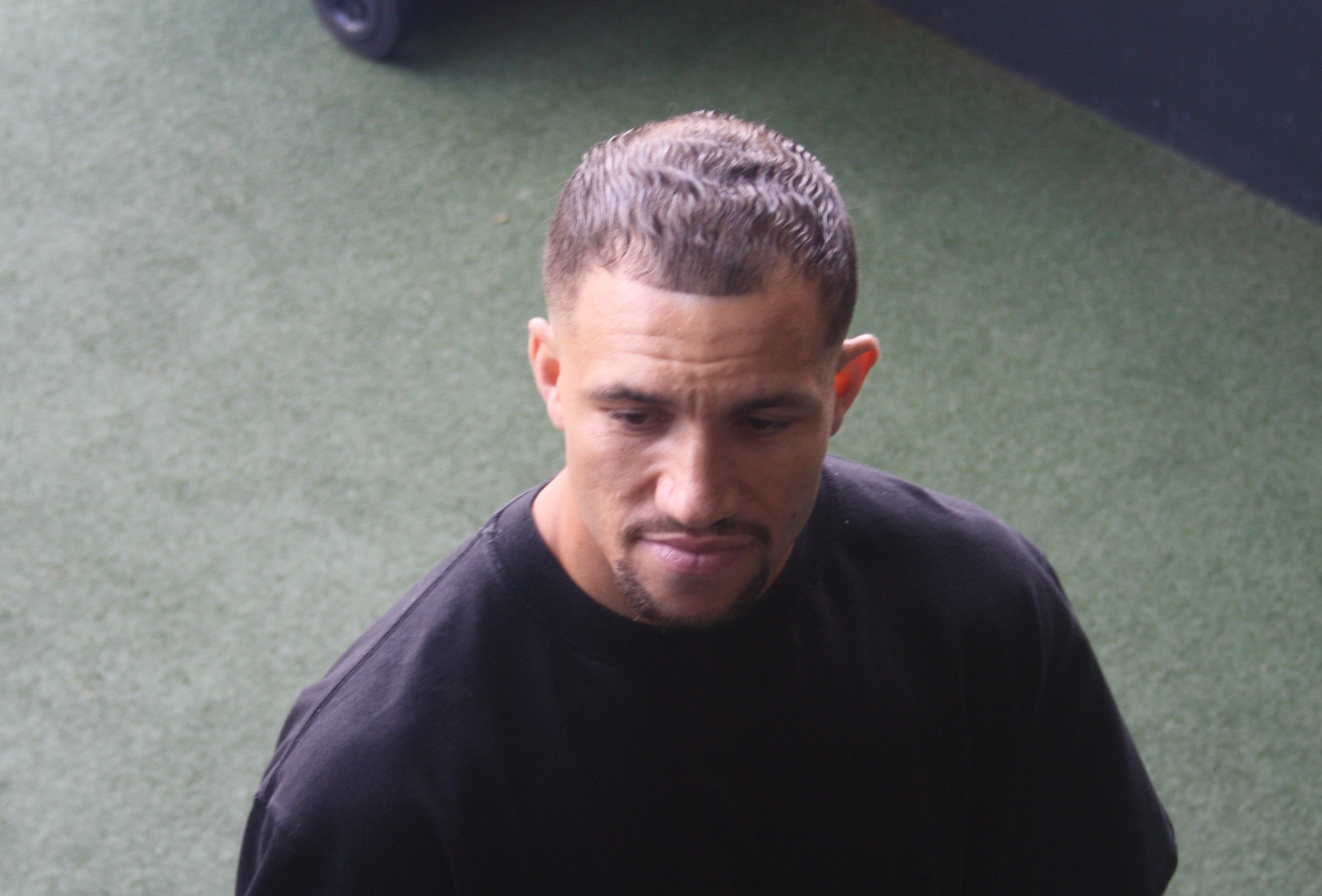
- Alexander in 2025

Personal information
- Full name: Cheye Christian Alexander
- Date of birth: 6 January 1995 (age 31)
- Place of birth: Newham, England
- Height: 5 ft 8 in (1.73 m)
- Position: Right-back

Youth career
- 2003–2013: West Ham United

Senior career*
Years	Team	Apps	(Gls)
2013–2014	Port Vale	0	(0)
2013–2014	→ Ilkeston (loan)	9	(0)
2014	Concord Rangers	2	(0)
2014–2015	Bishop's Stortford	1	(0)
2015–2018	Aldershot Town	135	(5)
2018–2020	Barnet	77	(2)
2020–2022	AFC Wimbledon	50	(0)
2022–2024	Gillingham	59	(3)
Total		333	(10)

International career
2016	England C	1	(0)
2023–2024	Saint Lucia	8	(0)
- * Club domestic league appearances and goals

Cheye Christian Alexander (born 6 January 1995) is a former professional footballer who played as a right-back. Born in England, he played for the Saint Lucia national team.

A former West Ham United Academy graduate, he spent the 2013–14 season with Port Vale, though he only played first-team games during a loan spell at Ilkeston. He had brief spells with Concord Rangers and Bishop's Stortford before joining Aldershot Town, initially on a non-contract basis, in March 2015. He remained with the club for over three seasons, playing 146 games in league and cup competitions. He was signed by Barnet in June 2018 and spent two seasons with the club before he returned to the English Football League following a six-year absence after signing with AFC Wimbledon. He spent two seasons with Wimbledon and signed with Gillingham in July 2022.

== Club career ==
=== Early career ===
Alexander was born in Newham and supported his local team West Ham United as a child. He joined their academy in 2003, remaining there for ten years before being released as an 18-year-old in summer 2013. He was diagnosed with Osgood–Schlatter disease, which causes knee pain but gave him a growth spurt during his last year as a schoolboy. This meant that he had to play through the pain during the 2011–12 season, and though he managed to join the under-18 team during the 2012–13 season, he was not given a professional contract by the club. He instead signed a one-year deal with Port Vale but did not make any first-team appearances for the "Valiants". On 13 December 2013, he joined Northern Premier League Premier Division side Ilkeston on a one-month loan deal. Vale manager Micky Adams confirmed that Alexander would not be offered a new contract in April 2014.

On 5 September 2014, he signed with Conference South side Concord Rangers. He made his debut for the club in a 2–0 win over Weston-super-Mare on 1 November and played a total of three games for the "Beach Boys". On 28 November 2014, he joined fellow Conference South club Bishop's Stortford. He played two games for the "Blues", one each in the league and FA Trophy.

=== Aldershot Town ===
Alexander joined Aldershot Town on a non-contract basis on 3 March 2015. He made his club debut in a 1–1 draw with Braintree Town on 11 April and played three further Conference Premier games by the end of the 2014–15 season. He signed a one-year contract with the "Shots" in June 2015. Manager Barry Smith said that "he's got all of the attributes of a full-back and he'll play in the style that I want to play".

He scored his first career goal on 22 August 2015, in a 4–0 win at Guiseley. He scored two goals in 50 appearances across the 2015–16 campaign. He signed a new one-year contract in June 2016, with manager Gary Waddock commenting that he felt he could improve the player further. He made 45 appearances during the 2016–17 season, scoring one goal, as Aldershot qualified for the play-offs with a fifth-place finish. However, they were beaten 5–2 on aggregate by Tranmere Rovers in the play-off semi-finals.

On 19 August 2017, he scored from 25 yards (23 m) out at Boreham Wood but claimed it meant nothing to him as the team lost the game 2–1. He ended the 2017–18 season with two goals in 45 games, with Aldershot again claiming a play-off spot with a fifth-place finish. However, this time, they lost a penalty shoot-out to Ebbsfleet United after their play-off quarter-final game ended in a 1–1 draw at the Recreation Ground. He was released by his own request in May 2018. Upon his departure from the club he said that "I feel I have improved as a player and I've learned so much at Aldershot.... it's an amazing club that's become a big part of my life".

=== Barnet ===
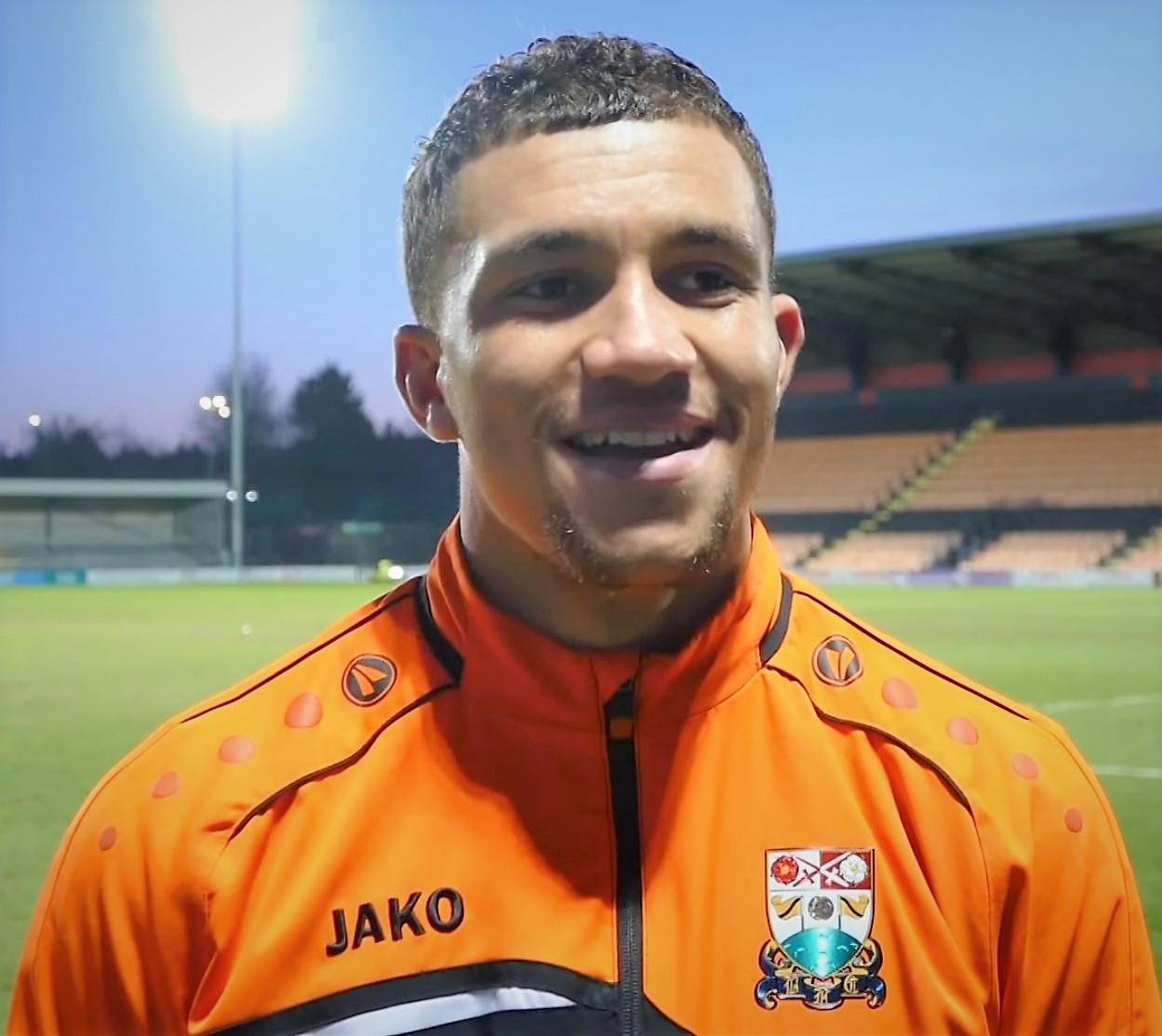
Alexander with Barnet in 2020

On 26 June 2018, Alexander joined Barnet on a two-year contract for an undisclosed fee, with "Bees" manager John Still admitting that he had tried to sign the player on previous occasions. He scored two goals from 53 appearances during the 2018–19 campaign as Barnet posted a 12th-place finish in the National League. He scored two goals in 42 games during the 2019–20 season, which ended early due to the COVID-19 pandemic in England, with Barnet in the play-offs with a seventh-place finish. He turned down a short-term contract extension in June 2020 that would have kept him at The Hive Stadium for the delayed play-off campaign after informing manager Darren Currie that he had found a move to a club in the English Football League.

=== AFC Wimbledon ===
On 23 July 2020, he returned to the Football League by signing for League One club AFC Wimbledon. Manager Glyn Hodges said that he had impressed the club's scouts and that he hoped to have found a "hidden gem in non league" as they found with left-back Nesta Guinness-Walker the previous year. He made his debut on 5 September, when he started an EFL Cup tie away at Oxford United. However, it was only when Mark Robinson succeeded Hodges as manager the following January that Alexander enjoyed a sustained run in the first-team. He made a total of 36 appearances in the 2020–21 season, helping the "Dons" to post a 19th-place finish in League One. He featured 25 times in the 2021–22 relegation campaign, but was unable to play for incoming manager Mark Bowen after missing the end of the season with a groin injury. He was released in June 2022.

=== Gillingham ===
Alexander signed for League Two side Gillingham on 15 July 2022 on a one-year deal after impressing manager Neil Harris whilst on trial. He made his debut for the Kent side as a 67th-minute substitute on the opening day of the 2022–23 season, in a 2–0 away loss to the team who had just released him, AFC Wimbledon. His first Gillingham goal came in the return fixture at Priestfield in February 2023, with his volley sealing a 2–1 victory over his former employers. He scored three goals in 48 games, making a sufficient number of appearances during the season to trigger an extension clause in his contract. His volleyed goal against AFC Wimbledon on 25 February won him the club's Goal of the Season award.

On 29 January 2024, he departed the club, having had his contract terminated by mutual consent; this followed the signing of wing-back Remeao Hutton and the admission from head coach Stephen Clemence that he was struggling to keep his squad happy with the amount of game time he was able to offer them.

== International career ==
Alexander played one game for the England C team, coming on as a substitute in an away win against Estonia U23 on 15 November 2016. In October 2023, he was called up to the Saint Lucia national team for a set of 2023–24 CONCACAF Nations League matches. On 13 October 2023, Alexander made his debut and played the full 90 minutes for Saint Lucia in a 2–1 win over Guadeloupe.

== Personal life ==
In 2016, Alexander set up his own brand, Christian Rose, combining his name with that of his younger sister Rose.

== Career statistics ==
Appearances and goals by club, season and competition
Club	Season	League			FA Cup		League Cup		Other		Total	
Club	Season	Division	Apps	Goals	Apps	Goals	Apps	Goals	Apps	Goals	Apps	Goals
Port Vale	2013–14	League One	0	0	0	0	0	0	0	0	0	0
Ilkeston (loan)	2013–14	NPL Premier Division	9	0	—		—		0	0	9	0
Concord Rangers	2014–15	Conference South	2	0	1	0	—		0	0	3	0
Bishop's Stortford	2014–15	Conference South	1	0	—		—		1 (Note: Appearances in FA Trophy)	0	2	0
Aldershot Town	2014–15	Conference Premier	4	0	—		—		—		4	0
Aldershot Town	2015–16	National League	46	2	3	0	—		1	0	50	2
Aldershot Town	2016–17	National League	42	1	0	0	—		3 (Note: Two appearances in FA Trophy, one appearance in National League play-offs)	0	45	1
Aldershot Town	2017–18	National League	43	2	2	0	—		2 (Note: One appearance in FA Trophy, one appearance in National League play-offs)	0	47	2
Aldershot Town	Total		135	5	5	0	—		6	0	146	5
Barnet	2018–19	National League	43	1	7	1	—		3	0	53	2
Barnet	2019–20	National League	34	1	3	0	—		5	1	42	2
Barnet	Total		77	2	10	1	—		8	1	95	4
AFC Wimbledon	2020–21	League One	29	0	2	0	1	0	4 (Note: Appearances in EFL Trophy)	0	36	0
AFC Wimbledon	2021–22	League One	21	0	1	0	1	0	2	0	25	0
AFC Wimbledon	Total		50	0	3	0	2	0	6	0	61	0
Gillingham	2022–23	League Two	37	3	4	0	4	0	3	0	48	3
Gillingham	2023–24	League Two	22	0	3	0	2	0	1	1	28	1
Gillingham	Total		59	3	7	0	6	0	4	1	76	4
Career total			333	10	26	1	8	0	25	2	392	13
