= Conor Masterson =

Irish footballer

- Masterson in 2023

Personal information
- Full name: Conor Ciaran Masterson
- Date of birth: 8 September 1998 (age 28)
- Place of birth: Celbridge, Ireland
- Height: 1.85 m (6 ft 1 in)
- Position: Centre-back

Team information
- Current team: Reading
- Number: 23

Youth career
- –2014: Lucan United
- 2014–2018: Liverpool

Senior career*
Years	Team	Apps	(Gls)
2018–2019	Liverpool	0	(0)
2019–2023	Queens Park Rangers	17	(1)
2021	→ Swindon Town (loan)	5	(0)
2021–2022	→ Cambridge United (loan)	16	(0)
2022	→ Gillingham (loan)	18	(0)
2023	→ Gillingham (loan)	20	(2)
2023–2026	Gillingham	77	(9)
2026–	Reading	1	(0)

International career
2014–2015	Republic of Ireland U17	11	(0)
2015–2017	Republic of Ireland U19	6	(0)
2019–2020	Republic of Ireland U21	13	(1)
- * Club domestic league appearances and goals as of 1 November 2026 (UTC)

Conor Ciaran Masterson (born 8 September 1998) is an Irish professional footballer who plays as a centre-back for EFL League One club Reading.

== Club career ==
=== Early career ===
Originally from Celbridge, County Kildare, in Ireland, Masterson played for Lucan United before joining Liverpool on his 16th birthday for a reported fee of €1m after being spotted playing for a Dublin & District Schoolboys League select team in 2012.

He made his U18s debut in 2014–15. Masterson went on to captain the under-18s and was an unused sub for Liverpool in their FA Cup tie at Exeter City in January 2016. He moved to the U23s squad ahead of the 2017–18 season.

He was named on the bench for Liverpool's UEFA Champions League 3–0 quarter final victory against Manchester City on 4 April 2018. He was named in Liverpool's Premier League squad for the match against Everton on 7 April 2018 and was included on the substitutes' bench.

Masterson was released by Liverpool at the end of the 2018–19 season.

=== Queens Park Rangers ===
On 3 July 2019, Masterson signed a two-year deal with Queens Park Rangers. On 5 January 2020, he made his debut for the club in an FA Cup third round 5–1 defeat of Swansea City. On 18 July 2020, Masterson scored his first senior goal when he opened the scoring in an eventual 4–3 victory over Millwall.

On 19 January 2021, Masterson joined League One side Swindon Town on loan until the end of the 2020-21 season On 21 August 2021, Masterson joined another League One side, Cambridge United, on loan until January 2022. Masterson was named in the starting line-up on the same day as the U's faced Burton Albion. On 4 January 2022, Masterson returned to QPR. On 28 January 2022, Masterson joined a third League One club, Gillingham, on loan until 30 April 2022. He again joined Gillingham on loan in January 2023.

=== Gillingham ===
After Queens Park Rangers opted not to renew his contract at the end of the 2022–23 season, Masterson signed a permanent contract with Gillingham to take effect on 1 July. He was named as the Kent side's Player of the Year for the 2023–24 season. On 24 June 2025, the club announced he had signed a new one-year deal.

He was released by Gillingham at the end of the 2025–26 season.

=== Reading ===
On 25 August 2026, Masterson joined League One side Reading until January 2027.

== International career ==
On 6 March 2014, Masterson made his debut for Republic of Ireland Under-17s in a 2–1 friendly win over Austria at Dalymount Park. At the 25th Annual FAI International Football Awards Masterson was named as the Under-16 International Player of the Year for 2014.

Masterson graduated to the Under-19 side on 10 October 2015 as an unused substitute in a 1–1 friendly draw against Ukraine, before making his debut in a 1–2 loss against the same side two days later.

He was first called up to the Under-21 side in March 2019 ahead of a European Championships qualifier against Luxembourg, going on to play the full 90 minutes in a 3–0 victory.

== Career statistics ==
As of match played 9 February 2024

Appearances and goals by club, season and competition
Club	Season	League			National Cup		League Cup		Other		Total	
Club	Season	Division	Apps	Goals	Apps	Goals	Apps	Goals	Apps	Goals	Apps	Goals
Liverpool	2017–18	Premier League	0	0	0	0	0	0	0	0	0	0
Liverpool	2018–19	Premier League	0	0	0	0	0	0	0	0	0	0
Queens Park Rangers	2019–20	Championship	12	1	2	0	0	0	—		14	1
Queens Park Rangers	2020–21	Championship	4	0	1	0	1	0	—		6	0
Queens Park Rangers	2022–23	Championship	1	0	0	0	0	0	—		1	0
Queens Park Rangers	Total		17	1	3	0	1	0	—		21	1
Swindon Town (loan)	2020–21	League One	5	0	—		—		—		5	0
Cambridge United (loan)	2021–22	League One	16	0	2	1	1	0	2	0	21	1
Gillingham (loan)	2021–22	League One	18	0	0	0	0	0	0	0	18	0
Gillingham (loan)	2022–23	League Two	20	2	0	0	0	0	0	0	20	2
Gillingham	2023–24	League Two	27	5	3	0	1	0	3	0	34	5
Career total			103	8	8	1	3	0	5	0	119	9

== Honours ==
Individual

- FAI Under-16 International Player of the Year: 2014
- Gillingham Player of the Season: 2023–24
