= Dom Jefferies =

Welsh association football player

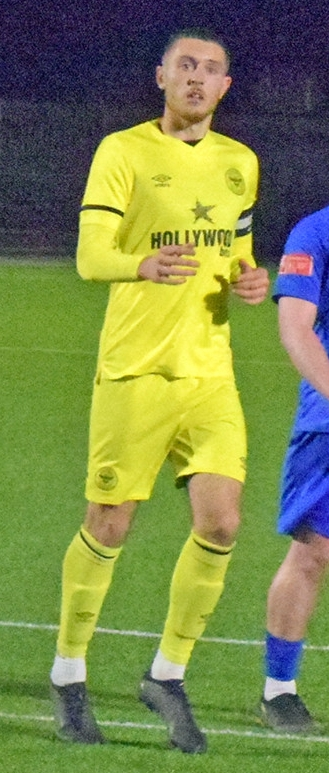
- Jefferies captaining Brentford B in April 2022.

Personal information
- Full name: Dominic William Jefferies
- Date of birth: 22 May 2002 (age 24)
- Place of birth: Newport, Wales
- Height: 1.79 m (5 ft 10 in)
- Position: Midfielder

Team information
- Current team: Lincoln City
- Number: 16

Youth career
- Caerleon
- Cardiff City
- –2019: Newport County

Senior career*
Years	Team	Apps	(Gls)
2019–2020	Newport County	0	(0)
2020	→ Salisbury (loan)	3	(1)
2020–2021	Salisbury	7	(0)
2021–2022	Brentford	0	(0)
2022–2024	Gillingham	56	(2)
2024–	Lincoln City	74	(7)
- * Club domestic league appearances and goals as of 17:01, 21 November 2026 (UTC)

Dominic William Jefferies (born 22 May 2002) is a Welsh professional footballer who plays as a midfielder for EFL Championship club Lincoln City.

Jefferies is a product of the Cardiff City and Newport County academies and began his professional career with Brentford B. Jefferies' senior career began in earnest with Gillingham in 2022, for whom he made over 70 appearances before transferring to Lincoln City in 2024.

== Career ==
=== Newport County ===
A midfielder, Jefferies came through the youth systems at Caerleon and Cardiff City, before joining the Newport County academy at the age of 14. He signed a scholarship at the age of 16 and made six first team appearances during the first half of the 2019–20 season, all in cup matches. On 21 January 2020, Jefferies joined Southern League Premier Division South club Salisbury on an initial one-month work experience loan. He made four appearances and scored one goal before being recalled to Rodney Parade after the initial one-month period, due to an injury crisis. Jefferies was an unused substitute during two further first team matches prior to the curtailment of the 2019–20 season in March 2020. He was not offered a professional contract and was released in June 2020.

=== Return to Salisbury ===
On 31 July 2020, Jefferies signed a permanent contract with Southern League Premier Division South club Salisbury. Prior to the 2020–21 season being declared null and void in February 2021, he had made nine appearances and scored one goal. Jefferies turned down a new contract and departed Salisbury in June 2021. He made 13 appearances and scored two goals during his two spells at the Raymond McEnhill Stadium.

=== Brentford ===
After spending much of the second half of the 2020–21 season on trial with the B team at Championship club Brentford, Jefferies transferred to the newly-promoted Premier League club on 24 June 2021. He signed a one-year contract, with the option of a further year, for a training compensation fee. Following the departure of B team captain Nathan Shepperd in January 2022, Jefferies took over the role and captained the team to victory in the 2022 London Senior Cup Final. Jefferies scored eight goals in 42 appearances during the 2021–22 season and his performances were recognised with the Brentford B Players' Player of the Year award. He transferred out of the club in June 2022.

=== Gillingham ===
On 16 June 2022, Jefferies signed an undisclosed-length contract with League Two club Gillingham, effective 22 June 2022. He made 44 appearances and scored one goal during a mid-table 2022–23 season and was recognised with the club's Young Player of the Year award. Jefferies remained under contract for the 2023–24 season and made 27 appearances (scoring one goal) during another mid-table campaign, in which he missed nearly three months with a thigh injury. Jefferies was offered a new contract at the end of the season, but he elected to transfer out from the club in July 2024. During his two seasons at Priestfield, Jefferies made 71 appearances and scored two goals.

=== Lincoln City ===
On 18 July 2024, Jefferies transferred to League One club Lincoln City and signed a two-year contract, with a two-year option, for an undisclosed fee. While playing through a hip issue, he made 43 appearances and scored three goals during the 2024–25 season, prior to undergoing surgery on the hip in April 2025. Jefferies missed the 2025–26 pre-season and returned to competitive match play in mid-November 2025. He made 29 appearances and scored two goals during the remainder of the 2025–26 League One championship-winning season. In mid-season, the club activated its two-year option on Jefferies' contract, which extended it until the end of the 2027–28 season. In August 2026, Jefferies signed a new two-year contract, with a one-year club option.

== Personal life ==
Jefferies' younger brother Isaac is also a footballer and as of October 2026, was a member of the Cardiff City Academy. Jefferies attended Caerleon Comprehensive School.

== Career statistics ==
As of 21 November 2026

Appearances and goals by club, season and competition
Club	Season	League			FA Cup		EFL Cup		Other		Total	
Club	Season	Division	Apps	Goals	Apps	Goals	Apps	Goals	Apps	Goals	Apps	Goals
Newport County	2019–20	League Two	0	0	1	0	0	0	5 (Note: Appearance(s) in EFL Trophy)	0	6	0
Salisbury (loan)	2019–20	SL Premier Division South	3	1	―		―		1 (Note: Appearance in Wiltshire Premier Shield)	0	4	1
Salisbury	2020–21	SL Premier Division South	7	0	0	0	―		2 (Note: Appearances in FA Trophy)	1	9	1
Brentford	2021–22	Premier League	0	0	0	0	0	0	0	0	0	0
Gillingham	2022–23	League Two	34	1	5	0	2	0	3	0	44	1
Gillingham	2023–24	League Two	22	1	3	0	1	0	1	0	27	1
Gillingham	Total		56	2	8	0	3	0	4	0	71	2
Lincoln City	2024–25	League One	34	3	3	0	1	0	5	0	43	3
Lincoln City	2025–26	League One	27	2	0	0	0	0	2	0	29	2
Lincoln City	2026–27	Championship	13	2	0	0	3	1	―		16	3
Lincoln City	Total		74	7	3	0	4	1	7	0	88	8
Career total			140	10	12	0	7	1	19	1	178	12

== Honours ==
Brentford B

- London Senior Cup: 2021–22

Lincoln City

- EFL League One: 2025–26

Individual

- Brentford B Mary Halder Award: 2021–22
- Gillingham Young Player of the Year: 2022–23
