= Tonbridge Angels F.C. =

Association football club in Tonbridge, England

Tonbridge Angels
- Full name: Tonbridge Angels Football Club
- Nickname: The Angels
- Founded: 31 October 1947 (as Tonbridge)
- Ground: Longmead Stadium, Tonbridge
- Capacity: 3,200 (760 seats)
- Chairman: Sophie Purves
- Manager: Alan Dunne
- League: National League South
- 2025–26: National League South, 14th of 24
Home colours	Away colours

Tonbridge Angels Football Club is a professional association football club based in Tonbridge, Kent, England. The team competes in the National League South, at the sixth tier of the English football league system.

The club was founded as Tonbridge Football Club in 1947 and became known as "The Angels" in 1949 when they started playing at the Angel Ground. Since 1980, they have played home matches at Longmead. The club reached what was then the Conference South in 2011 after winning the play-off final of the 2010–11 Isthmian League Premier Division. They were relegated back to the Isthmian League in 2014 but were promoted back to the National League South in 2019 after winning one of the "Step 3 Super Playoffs" at the end of the 2018–19 season.

Notable ex-players include England international Malcolm Macdonald, Aston Villa's league championship winning manager Ron Saunders, and former England manager Roy Hodgson.

== History ==
=== Formation and early history ===
Tonbridge Football Club was formed in October 1947 following the suggestion of local businessman and founder chairman Herbert Portch and was one of four clubs to be elected to the Southern Football League for the 1948–49 season. The club took out a lease on the Angel Ground, formerly the home of Kent County Cricket Club and named after the nearby hotel, 'The Angel'. Hence Tonbridge FC became known as 'The Angels'. A crowd of around 5,000 turned up for the club's opening league fixture against fellow newcomers Hastings United but the match was lost 2–1, with Albert Robson scoring the club's first ever goal. Progress was slow in the early days, with the club rock bottom at Christmas and with Harold Hobbis taking over as manager from Dunoon and Marshall Raybould, but the club would improve their form in the second half of the season to finish third from last.

Throughout the 1950s, the Angels (as they were nicknamed at the time, although it was not yet formally part of the club's name) would struggle to make any progress in the Southern League and a peak of 11th place was reached in 1949–50, the club's second season. However, Tonbridge would prove to be a strong side in cup competitions. In 1949–50, the club reached the semi-finals of the Southern League Cup, losing 3–2 to Colchester United. In three successive seasons, 1950–51, 1951–52 and 1952–53, Tonbridge reached the First Round Proper of the FA Cup, only to lose each of the three after a replay. Angels' opponents were Chelmsford City, Aldershot and Norwich City respectively. The Aldershot tie at the Angel Ground saw a record attendance of 8,236, while the Norwich City game was shrouded in controversy, with a late goal at Carrow Road settling the tie. The first trophy to be lifted came in 1951–52 with the Angels winning the Kent Senior Shield. Tonbridge would go on to win this trophy a further four times, in 1956, 1958, 1959 and 1964. Two Southern League Cup finals were reached and lost, beaten in 1954–55 by Yeovil Town and two seasons later by Hereford United, and two Kent Senior Cup finals were also lost in 1956–57 and 1958–59. The club were relegated from the Premier Division in 1961–62 but were promoted two seasons later finishing in 4th place after narrowly missing out the year before. However, the club were then relegated back to Division One in 1965–66. The notable success of the 1960s was the achievement of reaching the First Round Proper for a fourth time, this time being knocked out 1–0 by Dagenham. The club also won the Kent Senior Cup for the first time in 1964–65.

In 1972–73 Angels won promotion to the Premier Division by finishing as runners-up to Maidstone United. In the same season the First Round Proper of the FA Cup was reached once again as Charlton Athletic were the visitors to the Angel Ground. A crowd of 7,770 saw Charlton win 5–0. Tonbridge won the Kent Senior Cup in 1974–75 while managed by former World Cup winner George Cohen. After struggling to stay in the Premier Division, the club suffered financial troubles and went into voluntary liquidation in 1976. Tonbridge Angels FC was then formed and allowed to complete the fixture list on the understanding that relegation would result at the end of the 1975–76 season, wherever the club finished. Another major problem loomed soon after. The club's landlords, the local council, wanted the Angel Ground for development. A battle lasting up to three years that went as far as the High Courts ensued before the club was eventually offered a new ground at Longmead, its present home. The appropriately named Micky Angel scored the last goal at the old Angel Ground in 1980.

=== Move to Longmead Stadium: 1980–2004 ===
Former Tonbridge and Arsenal goalkeeper Tony Burns took over as manager for the 1980–81 season and the club's new Longmead Stadium hosted its first game on 18 August 1980, a crowd of 701 watching a Southern League Cup game against Crawley Town. Despite having a new home, finances proved to be a problem for the club. Burns departed for Gravesend & Northfleet in December 1982 to be replaced by John Keirs, who took the club to fourth place in the 1983–84 season, promotion only denied to the Angels on the final day of the season. Phil Emblen took over the reins in July 1985 and led the club to another Southern League Semi Final appearance in 1987, but his departure along with several key players at the end of the 1987–88 season led to a slump in the 40th anniversary season.

1988–89 proved to be a disaster for the club. Former Tottenham Hotspur man Terry Naylor took charge and lasted for just seven games, in that time only managing to earn a single drawn match. With the Angels at the bottom of the league Tommy Sampson came in to try to steady the ship but the damage was already done. The Angels bade farewell to the Southern League after 40 years, relegation to the Kent League being the club's "reward" after ending the season in next to bottom spot.

Angels regrouped for the 1989–90 season with former player and manager Tony Burns returning to manage the club for a second time. Tonbridge finished in a worthy third place, not enough for a quick return to Southern League football, but silverware was forthcoming in the form of the Kent League Cup. Another former manager returned for the 1990–91 season, Phil Emblen, and he sparked a revival in the club's fortunes. Emblen patiently built a winning team and after two fourth-placed finishes, money-spinning Cup runs and another Kent League Cup win, the title finally arrived at Longmead in the 1992–93 season. And so, after a few seasons away, Tonbridge returned to the league which they had graced for so many years.

The Angels briefly topped the Southern Division on their return to Southern League football in the 1993–94 season but settled for a mid-table finish, which was to be repeated the following season. The club struggled in the 1995–96 season with Phil Emblen resigning as Manager in February 1996 to be replaced by Bill Roffey and the club finished in 18th position. In 1996–97 Tonbridge had an improved season finishing in 8th place and in the summer of 1997 Paul Emblen broke the club's record transfer fee, moving to Charlton Athletic for £7,000. He was later transferred to Wycombe Wanderers for £60,000. His brother, ex-Angel Neil, has appeared for Millwall, Wolverhampton Wanderers, Crystal Palace and Norwich City.

After a disappointing start to the 1997–98 season Colin Blewden took over as Player-Manager in October and hauled the club away from the relegation zone to finish in 14th place and led the Angels to a 16th-place finish in 1998–99. The 1999–2000 season was the club's most successful since re-joining the Southern League. A run of fourteen games at the end of the season, in which just one defeat was suffered, secured a final league placing of seventh. The following season, it appeared that the Angels might better that seventh-place finish. A storming start to the season saw just two of their first nineteen league matches lost. However, a run of five defeats in six matches late on left the Angels in eighth spot come the end of the season.

The 2001–02 season was not a successful one for the club. Blewden resigned in October and Tonbridge were one of several clubs involved in a relegation dogfight. They escaped the drop by winning two and drawing one of their last four matches, leaving them four points ahead of relegated Wisbech Town at the end.

Alan Walker was appointed manager at the start of season 2002–03 and that season was arguably the most successful since joining the Southern League, the club eventually finishing ninth after a fine end of season run. That run continued into the 2003–04 season with a club record of 26 league matches unbeaten being ended in December 2003, at which point the Angels were comfortable leaders of the Eastern Division. Walker left the club shortly after due to a loss of sponsorship and the Angels replaced him with player-manager Tony Dolby. After an initial period of mixed results, Dolby steadied the ship and brought in Mike Rutherford as assistant coach before keeping the Angels in the title battle until the penultimate game of the season. The Angels finally finished in third, the club's highest position in the Southern League for more than 25 years.

=== Isthmian League and Conference South: 2004–present ===
The 2004 reorganisation of the English football league system saw the Angels placed in the Isthmian League Premier Division. They were relegated in their first season but bounced back at the first attempt, in the most dramatic of fashions, after a rollercoaster 2005–06 season. Tonbridge were undefeated until October but a bad run of results threatened to undermine the promotion bid, but the Angels always did enough to stay in the play-off places and a late surge secured third place and with it home advantage in the play-offs. Tooting & Mitcham were defeated in the Semi-Final match before a dream Final pitted the Angels at home to old Kent rivals Dover Athletic. The Lilywhites were beaten 3–2 in front of a new record Longmead Stadium attendance of 1,863.

The Angels finished the 2006–07 season in 11th place with striker Jon Main scoring 44 goals in all competitions. They then went on to better that by finishing 8th in 2007–08, missing out on the playoffs by a matter of points, despite having been languishing second from bottom when new manager Tommy Warrilow took over. Season 2008–09 saw the Angels finish in third place, reaching the play-off semi-final where they lost to Carshalton Athletic.

In the 2010–11 season the team confirmed a play-off place with the final league game. They beat Harrow Borough 3–2 in the play-off semi-final to set up a meeting with Lowestoft Town in the final. Tonbridge won the game 4–3 with Lewis Taylor scoring the winner just 10 minutes from the end to confirm the Angels' promotion into the Conference South for the 2011–12 season, the highest achievement ever by the club.

The club's inaugural campaign in the Conference South saw them finish in 9th place after enjoying a moderately successful season.

The following season, the club narrowly escaped relegation and reached the Kent Senior Cup finals where they lost 7–1 at home to a Charlton XI.

The Angels were relegated from the Conference South to the Isthmian League Premier for the start of the 2014/15 season. Manager Tommy Warrilow left the club after 7 years to be replaced by long-term Sutton United coach Steve McKimm.

The Angels remained in the Isthmian League Premier division until the 2018–19 season. During the 2018/19 season they finished 4th place and gained a spot in the play-offs. Tonbridge played 3rd place Haringey Borough away in the semi-final and beat them 2–1. The final of the play-offs would be played against 5th placed Merstham in a game that the Angels won 2–0 at home in front of a crowd of 2,268. Owing to a change in the National League structure for the 2018–19 season, this meant that Tonbridge would have to play a further 'Step 3 Super Play-off' final against the winners of the Southern Football League Premier Division South play-offs, Metropolitan Police. This took place on 11 May 2019 and Tonbridge ended up the victors after a 3–2 win after extra time away at Met's ground. This victory gained Tonbridge promotion to the National League South for the 2019–20 season.

== Players ==
=== Current squad ===
As of 5 October 2026.

Note: Flags indicate national team as defined under FIFA eligibility rules; some limited exceptions apply. Players may hold more than one non-FIFA nationality.

No.	Pos.	Nation	Player
1	GK	ENG	Nathan Harness
2	DF	ENG	Harvey Lintott
5	DF	ENG	Ethan Sutcliffe
6	DF	ENG	Lexus Beeden
7	FW	ENG	Ricky Korboa
8	MF	ENG	Sam Corne (captain)
9	FW	ENG	Frankie Baker
10	FW	ENG	Lamar Reynolds
11	FW	ENG	Bunmi Babajide
13	GK	ENG	Archie Burford
14	MF	ENG	Jaden Brown
15	MF	ENG	Hayden Bullas (on loan from Bromley)

No.	Pos.	Nation	Player
16	FW	ENG	Alfie Pavey
17	MF	ENG	Jephte Tanga
19	MF	ENG	Kai Martin-O'Flynn
20	DF	ENG	Jordon Thompson (vice-captain)
21	FW	ENG	Miller McDonald
22	DF	ENG	Brad Williams
25	MF	ENG	Harry Gardner
26	DF	ENG	Dani Sulovari
27	DF	ENG	Bailey Akehurst
28	MF	ENG	Brody Cockerill
30	GK	ENG	Rocco Yiasemides
—	GK	ENG	Alfie McGuire

=== Out on loan ===
Note: Flags indicate national team as defined under FIFA eligibility rules; some limited exceptions apply. Players may hold more than one non-FIFA nationality.

No.	Pos.	Nation	Player

== Community ownership ==
During the 2014–15 season, steps were taken by supporters to purchase shares in the club to make it majority owned by supporters. They contested the 2015–16 pre-season Supporters Direct shield, with their first match against Fisher on 25 July.

== Stadium ==
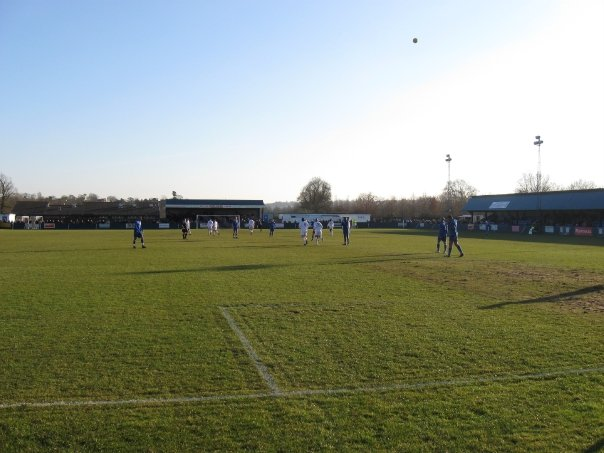
The Longmead Stadium from the Jack Maddams Stand. The West Stand is on the right.

The club plays their home games at Longmead Stadium, Darenth Avenue, Tonbridge TN10 3JF. The stadium has a capacity of 3,200 people. Covered terraces are in place behind each goal, which were named after the Mezzanine Floor Company who helped build them.

In 2008 the North Stand was renamed The Jack Maddams Stand in memory of the young player who died that year. In the same year, the club installed over 760 seats in the West Stand which was brought over from the old Angel Ground when the club first moved to the Longmead.

On 2 May 2022 the Angels played their last game on grass at Longmead. For the start of the 2022–23 season a new professional 3G pitch was laid, together with other ground works and new floodlights.

The new FIFA standard 3G pitch was formally opened before the Angels' first league game at Longmead Stadium on 20 August 2022.

== Records ==
=== Attendance ===
During the club's Kent League days, Longmead Stadium's record attendance for a competitive match was beaten three times in ten days during a memorable FA Cup run. After an abandoned 3rd Qualifying Round replay with Hampton in front of over 800 fans, the game was rearranged and drew an impressive attendance of 1,274. Just five days later the 4th Qualifying Round tie against Yeovil drew a crowd of 1,483. Season 1997–98 saw an attendance of 2,412 when the full Crystal Palace first team squad appeared for a charity match in aid of two local hospices, making 30 March 1998 a memorable evening in the club's history. The current record attendance for a competitive match at Longmead is 2,806, which was set on 26 December 2023 in the National League South fixture against Maidstone United. The largest attendance for any game by the club was witnessed at the Angel Ground where an FA Cup tie in 1951–52 against Aldershot was attended by 8,236 spectators.

On 2 November 2024, an attendance of 3,132 witnessed the FA Cup 1st round match against Harborough Town.

=== Biggest win/defeat ===
The Angels' biggest win came about in the FA Cup in 1951 (Angel Ground) when Worthing were beaten 11–1. Two seasons before that a 2–11 loss at Folkestone in the Kent Senior Cup had given the club its record defeat. The biggest win at Longmead Stadium was on 5 September 2017 when the Angels defeated Herne Bay 10–1 in the Isthmian League Cup.

=== Goalscoring ===
Kevin McCurley had held the record for goals in a season for 45 years, having amassed 40 goals in 1961–62. His record was finally beaten by prolific striker Jon Main who scored 44 goals. This tally included seven hat-tricks which was a record for trebles in a season, and also equalled the record for career hat-tricks set by Jimmy Constantine in the 1950s. Main claimed this record in October 2007 by scoring an eighth treble against Stotfold in the FA Cup.

=== Cup runs ===
- Best FA Cup performance: First round, 1972–73, 2020–21, 2024–25
- Best FA Trophy performance: Fifth round, 2021–22

== Honours ==
League

- Isthmian League (level 7)
  - Play-off winners: 2011, 2019
- National League Step 3 Super play-offs
  - Play-off winners: 2019
- Isthmian League Division One (level 8)
  - Play-off winners: 2006
- Kent Football League
  - Champions: 1992–93
- Metropolitan League
  - Champions: 1952–53

Cup

- Kent League Cup
  - Winners: 1989–90, 1991–92
- Kent League Charity Shield
  - Winners: 1993–94
- Kent Senior Cup
  - Winners: 1964–65, 1974–75
- Kent Senior Shield
  - Winners: 1951–52, 1955–56, 1957–58, 1958–59, 1963–64
- Kent Floodlit Cup
  - Winners: 1963–64, 1966–67
- Isthmian League Cup
  - Runners-up: 2016–17
- Courier Cup
  - Winners: 2001 (shared), 2002, 2003, 2004, 2005, 2007, 2008 (won by reserves), 2009, 2013
- Metropolitan League Cup
  - Winners: 1951–52, 1952–53 & 1956–57
- Supporters Shield
  - Winners: 2015
