= Josh Walker (footballer, born 1997) =

English footballer (born 1997)

Personal information
- Full name: Joshua James Walker
- Date of birth: 28 December 1997 (age 28)
- Place of birth: Tower Hamlets, England
- Height: 1.76 m (5 ft 9 in)
- Position: Striker

Team information
- Current team: Hornchurch
- Number: 7

Youth career
- Tottenham Hotspur
- –2016: Fulham

Senior career*
Years	Team	Apps	(Gls)
2016–2017	Fulham	0	(0)
2017	→ Wealdstone (loan)	4	(1)
2017–2018	Hendon	32	(16)
2018–2021	Barnet	50	(11)
2021–2023	Dagenham & Redbridge	56	(20)
2023–2024	Burton Albion	29	(3)
2024	→ Gillingham (loan)	16	(1)
2024–2026	Southend United	63	(10)
2026–	Hornchurch	16	(0)
- * Club domestic league appearances and goals as of 21:27, 8 November 2026 (UTC)

Joshua James Walker (born 28 December 1997) is an English professional footballer who plays as a striker for Hornchurch.

== Career ==
Born in Tower Hamlets, Walker spent his youth career with Tottenham Hotspur and Fulham. He then spent time in non-league with Wealdstone, Hendon, Barnet, and Dagenham & Redbridge, before signing for Burton Albion in January 2023.

In January 2024, he joined League Two side Gillingham on loan until the end of the season. He scored on his debut for the club, in a 2–1 away defeat.

On 8 July 2024, Walker joined National League side Southend United on a two-year deal for an undisclosed fee.

== Career statistics ==
As of match played 27 January 2026

Appearances and goals by club, season and competition
Club	Season	League			FA Cup		League Cup		Other		Total	
Club	Season	Division	Apps	Goals	Apps	Goals	Apps	Goals	Apps	Goals	Apps	Goals
Wealdstone (loan)	2016–17	National League South	4	1	—		—		—		4	1
Hendon	2017–18	Isthmian League Premier Division	32	16	0	0	—		10 (Note: Two appearances and one goal in Isthmian League Premier Division play-offs, two in FA Trophy, two in Isthmian League Cup, two in Middlesex Senior Cup, two in London Senior Cup)	1	42	17
Barnet	2018–19	National League	18	2	4	0	—		0	0	22	2
Barnet	2019–20	National League	26	8	3	2	—		6 (Note: Four appearances and five goals in FA Trophy, two in National League play-offs)	5	35	15
Barnet	2020–21	National League	6	1	1	0	—		1 (Note: Appearance(s) in FA Trophy)	0	8	1
Barnet	Total		50	11	8	2	—		7	5	65	18
Dagenham & Redbridge	2021–22	National League	32	10	1	0	—		4	1	37	11
Dagenham & Redbridge	2022–23	National League	24	10	4	3	—		1	0	29	13
Dagenham & Redbridge	Total		56	20	5	3	—		5	1	66	24
Burton Albion	2022–23	League One	16	2	—		—		—		16	2
Burton Albion	2023–24	League One	13	1	2	0	0	0	4 (Note: Appearance(s) in EFL Trophy)	0	19	1
Burton Albion	Total		29	3	2	0	0	0	4	0	35	3
Gillingham (loan)	2023–24	League Two	16	1	0	0	0	0	0	0	16	1
Southend United	2024–25	National League	35	4	1	0	–		3 (Note: 2 appearances in National League play-offs, 1 appearance and 1 goal in FA Trophy)	1	39	5
Southend United	2025–26	National League	20	5	1	0	–		1	1	22	6
Southend United	Total		55	9	2	0	0	0	4	2	61	11
Career total			242	61	17	5	0	0	30	9	289	75
