= Jayden Clarke =

English footballer (born 2001)

Personal information
- Full name: Jayden Richard Clarke
- Date of birth: 8 May 2001 (age 25)
- Place of birth: Islington, England
- Height: 1.75 m (5 ft 9 in)
- Position: Midfielder

Team information
- Current team: Forest Green Rovers
- Number: 4

Youth career
- Tottenham Hotspur

Senior career*
Years	Team	Apps	(Gls)
- Bedfont Sports
2020–2022	Hendon	49	(5)
2022–2023	Dulwich Hamlet	22	(4)
2023–2025	Gillingham	68	(7)
2025–	Forest Green Rovers	32	(5)
- * Club domestic league appearances and goals as of 18:02, 22 March 2026 (UTC)

Jayden Richard Clarke (born 8 May 2001) is an English professional footballer who plays as a midfielder for Forest Green Rovers.

== Career ==
=== Early career ===
Clarke played for Tottenham Hotspur's academy. After playing for Bedfont Sports, he joined Hendon in August 2020. He made his debut on 25 August, in a London Senior Cup match against Wingate & Finchley, which finished 3–1 to Hendon. In his first season with Hendon, he made 14 appearances and scored 3 times, and signed a contract extension the following season. He won the Hendon Young Player of the Year award in the 2021–22 season. Across his 2 seasons with the club, he made 63 appearances and scored 11 goals.

The following summer, he went on trial with National League South side Dulwich Hamlet, playing in 7 pre-season friendlies before securing a move to the club in August 2022. He made his National League South debut on 7 August, the first game of the season; he came on for Kreshnic Krasniqi in the 64th minute, and scored the winner to win the match 2–1. He won the August and December Dulwich Hamlet Player of the Month awards, and also the National League South Player of the Month in December.

=== Gillingham ===
Clarke signed for Gillingham in January 2023. By March he had played one game for the club in the Kent Senior Cup, and was linked with a loan move away, but the club decided to retain him. He made his Football League debut on 22 April 2023, in a 2–2 draw against Bradford. On 8 May 2023, he made his first start in a 2–0 victory against Salford. His first goals for the club came on 14 September 2024, where he got a brace in a 3–0 win against Tranmere Rovers. He was released from his contract at Gillingham at the end of the 2024–25 season.

=== Forest Green Rovers ===
On 10 July 2025, Clarke signed for Forest Green Rovers of the National League.
