= 2026–27 Gillingham F.C. season =

English football club season

Gillingham
2026–27 season
- Owner: Brad Galinson
- Chairman: Brad Galinson
- Manager: Gareth Ainsworth
- Stadium: Priestfield Stadium

The 2026–27 season is the 134th season in the history of Gillingham Football Club and their fifth consecutive season in League Two. In addition to the domestic league, the club will also participate in the FA Cup, the EFL Cup, and the EFL Trophy.

== Transfers and contracts ==
=== In ===
Date	Pos.	Player	Transferred From	Fee	Source
1 July 2026 (Note: The transfer was announced on 2 June, and would become official on July 1 once Albarus' contract at Brighton & Hove Albion had expired.)	CM	(England) Zane Albarus	(England) Brighton & Hove Albion	Free	
1 July 2026 (Note: The transfer was announced on 28 May, and would become official on July 1 once Brophy's contract at Cambridge United had expired.)	LWB	(England) James Brophy	(England) Cambridge United	Free	
1 July 2026 (Note: The transfer was announced on 10 June, and would become official on July 1 once Goodwin's contract at Oxford United had expired.)	CF	(England) Will Goodwin	(England) Oxford United	Free	
1 July 2026 (Note: The transfer was announced on 19 June, and would become official on July 1 once Gordon's contract at Motherwell had expired.)	CB	(Scotland) Liam Gordon	(Scotland) Motherwell	Free	
1 July 2026 (Note: The transfer was announced on 25 June, and would become official on July 1 once Harris' contract at Salford City had expired.)	LW	(England) Kadeem Harris	(England) Salford City	Free	
3 July 2026	GK	(England) Lennon MacLorg	(England) Charlton Athletic	Free	
28 July 2026	CM	(England) Nick Freeman	(England) Shrewsbury Town	Free	
29 July 2026	CB	(England) Samuel Tabares	(England) Southampton	Free	
3 August 2026	LB	(Republic of Ireland) Conor McManus	(England) Brentford	Undisclosed	
1 September 2026	CDM	(Wales) Eli King	(Wales) Cardiff City	Undisclosed	
26 September 2026	GK	(England) Rohan Luthra	(England) Eastbourne Borough	Free	
29 September 2026	CF	(England) Tom Eaves	(England) Northampton Town	Free	

=== Out ===
Date	Pos.	Player	Transferred to	Fee	Source
31 July 2026	CB	(England) Sam Gale	(England) Barnsley	Undisclosed	
19 August 2026	CF	(England) Seb Palmer-Houlden	(Scotland) Motherwell	Undisclosed	

=== Loaned in ===
Date	Pos.	Player	Loaned From	Until	Source
3 July 2026	GK	(England) Ollie Wright	(England) Southampton	End of Season	
4 August 2026	RW	(Guyana) Sheldon Kendall	(England) Millwall	End of Season	
8 August 2026	GK	(Republic of Ireland) Owen Mason	(England) Mansfield Town	15 August 2026	
15 August 2026	GK	(Australia) Ashley Maynard-Brewer	(England) Sheffield Wednesday	26 August 2026 (Note: On 20 August, Maynard-Brewer's emergency loan from Sheffield Wednesday was extended for another week)	
27 August 2026	CF	(The Gambia) Lamin Sillah	(England) Nottingham Forest	End of Season	
30 August 2026	CB	(England) Jack Daley	(England) Middlesbrough	End of Season	
1 September 2026	CM	(Kenya) Zech Obiero	(England) Leyton Orient	End of Season	

=== Loaned out ===
Date	Pos.	Player	Loaned to	Until	Source
6 August 2026	CDM	(England) Nelson Khumbeni	(England) Eastleigh	End of Season	
9 October 2026	CF	(England) Zac Whitelock	(England) Farnborough	30 October 2026	
17 October 2026	RB	(England) Harry Webster	(England) Hemel Hempstead Town	17 November 2026	
30 October 2026	CF	(England) Zac Whitelock	(England) Ashford United	30 November 2026	

=== Released / out of contract ===
Date	Pos.	Player	Subsequent club	Joined date	Source
30 June 2026	CF	(England) Josh Andrews	(England) Grimsby Town	1 July 2026	
30 June 2026	GK	(England) Glenn Morris	(England) Dorking Wanderers	1 July 2026	
30 June 2026	CF	(England) Elliott Nevitt	(England) Oldham Athletic	1 July 2026	
30 June 2026	CM	(Northern Ireland) Euan Williams	(England) Dover Athletic	1 July 2026	
30 June 2026	CF	(Cyprus) Marcus Wyllie	(England) Aldershot Town	1 July 2026	
30 June 2026	LB	(Montserrat) Lenni Cirino	(England) Hednesford Town	2 July 2026	
30 June 2026	CB	(Republic of Ireland) Shadrach Ogie	(England) Woking	25 July 2026	
30 June 2026	GK	(England) Jake Turner	(Wales) Newport County	21 August 2026	
30 June 2026	CB	(Republic of Ireland) Conor Masterson	(England) Reading	25 August 2026	
30 June 2026	CF	(Wales) Sam Vokes	Retired		
30 June 2026	CF	(England) Harry Bridle			
30 June 2026	LB	(England) Max Clark			
30 June 2026	RM	(England) Aaron Rowe			
30 June 2026	CM	(England) Stanley Skipper			
30 June 2026	CAM	(Wales) Jonny Williams	(England) Eastleigh	24 September 2026	
17 July 2026	RB	(England) Remeao Hutton	(England) Chesterfield	17 July 2026	

=== New contract ===
Date	Pos.	Player	Contract expiry	Source
3 August 2026	CM	(England) Cruz Beszant	Undisclosed (Note: First professional contract)	
3 August 2026	CM	(England) Louie Dayal	Undisclosed	
3 August 2026	CM	(England) Michael Luxton	Undisclosed	
12 September 2026	LW	(England) Sullivan Booth	30 June 2029	

== Pre-season and friendlies ==
On 15 May, The Gills announced their first season friendly, against Ebbsfleet United. Eleven days later, a second and third fixture was confirmed against Dover Athletic and Chatham Town. On 29 May, a fourth fixture was added against Charlton Athletic. Six days later, a friendly against Millwall was confirmed.

Win Draw Loss Fixtures

14 July 2026 Friendly	Dover Athletic	0–3	Gillingham	River
19:30 BST		Report	Harris 13'; Dayal 51'; Gale 78'	Stadium: Crabble

18 July 2026 Friendly	Gillingham	0–1	Charlton Athletic	Gillingham
15:00 BST		Report	Burke 65'	Stadium: MEMS Priestfield Stadium; Attendance: 2,747 (935 away); Referee: Harry Wager

21 July 2026 Friendly	Gillingham	1–0	Millwall	Gillingham
19:00 BST	Goodwin 17'; Gordon (yellow card) 57'	Report		Stadium: MEMS Priestfield Stadium; Attendance: 3,650 (1,800 away); Referee: Isaac Searle

24 July 2026 Friendly	Chatham Town	1–0	Gillingham XI	Chatham
19:45 BST	Giles 30'	Report		Stadium: Bauvill Stadium

25 July 2026 Friendly	Brentford B	2–1	Gillingham	Osterley
15:00 BST		Report	Beckles	Stadium: Brentford FC Training Ground; Attendance: 0 (BCD)

31 July 2026 Friendly	Ebbsfleet United	1–2	Gillingham	Northfleet
19:00 BST	Box 15'	Report	Theodore 29'; Khumbeni 70'	Stadium: Morrow Stadium; Attendance: 1,102

== Competitions ==
=== Overall record ===
Competition	First match	Last match	Starting round	Final position	Record							
Competition	First match	Last match	Starting round	Final position	Pld	W	D	L	GF	GA	GD	Win %
League Two	August 2026	May 2027	Matchday 1	TBD	0	0	0	0	0	0	+0	—
FA Cup	November 2026	TBD	First round	TBD	0	0	0	0	0	0	+0	—
EFL Cup	August 2026	TBD	First round	TBD	0	0	0	0	0	0	+0	—
EFL Trophy	August 2026	TBD	Group Stage	TBD	0	0	0	0	0	0	+0	—
Total					0	0	0	0	0	0	+0	—

Last updated: pre-season
Source: Soccerway

=== League Two ===
==== League table ====
Pos	Team	Pld	W	D	L	GF	GA	GD	Pts
9	Newport County	16	5	7	4	24	19	+5	22
10	Tranmere Rovers	16	5	7	4	21	19	+2	22
11	Gillingham	16	5	6	5	23	24	−1	21
12	Cheltenham Town	16	6	3	7	23	29	−6	21
13	Shrewsbury Town	16	6	3	7	20	27	−7	21

Updated to match(es) played on 21 November 2026. Source: EFL Official Website
Rules for classification: 1) Points; 2) Goal difference; 3) Number of goals scored; 4) Head-to-head results; 5) Wins; 6) Away goals; 7) Penalty points (sec 9.5); 8) 12-point sending off offences

==== League results summary ====
Overall								Home						Away					
Pld	W	D	L	GF	GA	GD	Pts	W	D	L	GF	GA	GD	W	D	L	GF	GA	GD
16	5	6	5	23	24	−1	21	2	4	2	11	12	−1	3	2	3	12	12	0

Last updated: 21 November 2026.
Source: Soccerway

==== League results by round ====
Round	1	2	3	4	5	6	7	8	9	10	11	12	13	14	15	16	17	18	19	20	21	22	23	24	25	26	27	28	29	30	31	32	33
Ground	H	A	H	A	A	H	H	A	H	A	A	H	H	A	A	H	A	H	A	H	A	H	H	A	H	A	A	H	A	H	H	A	H
Result	L	D	D	D	W	W	W	L	D	W	L	D	L	W	L	D																	
Position	23	21	21	21	13	11	4	8	10	4	6	7	12	8	12	11																	
Points	0	1	2	3	6	9	12	12	13	16	16	17	17	20	20	21																	

Source: EFL
A = Away; H = Home; W = Win; D = Draw; L = Loss; P = Postponed

==== Matches ====
On 25 June, the League Two fixtures were revealed.

Win Draw Loss Fixtures

15 August 2026 1	Gillingham	0–3	Walsall	Gillingham
15:00 BST	Smith (yellow card) 43'; Harris (yellow card) 47'; McKenzie (yellow card) 58'; Hale (yellow card) 90+3'	Report	Ahui (yellow card) 12'; Crew (yellow card) 55'; Moore 81'; Connolly 89'; Pressley 90+6'	Stadium: MEMS Priestfield Stadium; Attendance: 6,125 (511 away); Referee: Emily Heaslip

22 August 2026 2	Fleetwood Town	0–0	Gillingham	Fleetwood
15:00 BST	Bennett (yellow card) 30'	Report	Harris (yellow card) 41'; Brophy (yellow card) 58'	Stadium: Highbury Stadium; Attendance: 2,675 (336 Gills fans); Referee: Dale Baines

29 August 2026 3	Gillingham	1–1	Northampton Town	Gillingham
15:00 BST	McKenzie (yellow card) 4'; McManus 7'; Beckles (yellow card) 14'	Report	Fornah (yellow card) 26'; Briggs 36', (yellow card) 72'; Maxwell (yellow card) 54'; Dyche (yellow card) 79'	Stadium: MEMS Priestfield Stadium; Attendance: 5,701 (537 away); Referee: Elliott Swallow

1 September 2026 4	Chesterfield	1–1	Gillingham	Whittington Moor
19:45 BST	Koroma 22'; McFadzean (yellow card) 31'	Report	Dobbs (yellow card) 29'; Hale 58'; Goodwin (yellow card) 90+5'	Stadium: SMH Group Stadium; Attendance: 6,103; Referee: Ross Martin

5 September 2026 5	Rochdale	1–4	Gillingham	Spotland
15:00 BST	Francis (yellow card) 51' (yellow-red card) 60'; Tasker 87'	Report	McManus (yellow card) 9'; Brophy 33', 68'; Beckles 53'; Sillah 56'	Stadium: Crown Oil Arena; Attendance: 4,003 (388 away); Referee: Jamie Robinson

12 September 2026 6	Gillingham	2–0	Tranmere Rovers	Gillingham
15:00 BST	McKenzie (yellow card) 26'; King (yellow card) 35'; Dobbs 68'; Hale 80'; McManus (yellow card) 86'	Report	Smith (yellow card) 31'; Vaulks (yellow card) 89'	Stadium: MEMS Priestfield Stadium; Attendance: 5,611 (349 away); Referee: Alan Young

19 September 2026 7	Gillingham	3–0	Bristol Rovers	Gillingham
15:00 BST	Brophy 55'; Kendall 85', 89'; McCleary (yellow card) 90+5'		Harrison (yellow card) 65'; Balmer (yellow card) 68'	Stadium: MEMS Priestfield Stadium; Referee: Sunny Gill

26 September 2026 8	York City	3–0	Gillingham	Huntington
15:00 BST	Grey 2', (yellow card) 45+3'; Malcolm 75'; Pearce 79'	Report	Beckles (yellow card) 37'; McKenzie (yellow card) 45+1'; McCleary (yellow card) 50'; Albarus (yellow card) 60' (yellow-red card) 70'	Stadium: LNER Community Stadium; Attendance: 8,268 (886 Gills supporters); Referee: Scott Oldham

3 October 2026 9	Gillingham	0–0	Newport County	Gillingham
15:00 BST	Hale (yellow card) 14'; Sillah (yellow card) 15'; Dobbs (yellow card) 74'; Daley (yellow card) 79'		Biggins (yellow card) 45+1'; Norman (yellow card) 70'	Stadium: MEMS Priestfield Stadium; Referee: Carl Brook

10 October 2026 10	Rotherham United	1–4	Gillingham	Rotherham
15:00 BST	Mullin 17'; Eyestone (yellow card) 66'; Iorfa (yellow card) 75'; Aljofree (yellow card) 88'	Report	Hale 34', 67' (pen.); Brophy (yellow card) 47'; Dobbs (yellow card) 51'; Sillah 60'; Eaves 89' (pen.)	Stadium: AESSEAL New York Stadium; Attendance: 7,492 (565 Gills supporters); Referee: William Davis

17 October 2026 11	Accrington Stanley	3–1	Gillingham	Accrington
15:00 BST	Matthews (yellow card) 6'; Mols 11'; Love (yellow card) 19'; Woods 28', 66'	Report	Waldock (yellow card) 21'; Matthews 31' (o.g.); Little (yellow card) 33'; Hale (yellow card) 79'	Stadium: Wham Stadium; Attendance: 1,874; Referee: Will Finnie

20 October 2026 12	Gillingham	1–1	Port Vale	Gillingham
20:00 BST	Hale 42' (pen.); McManus (yellow card) 79'; Daley (yellow card) 85'	Report	Moon (yellow card) 56'; Figueroa 66'	Stadium: MEMS Priestfield Stadium; Attendance: 4,866; Referee: Jamie O'Connor
Note: Fixture was initially scheduled for a 19:45 kick-off, but was pushed back for live Sky Sports broadcasting.

24 October 2026 13	Gillingham	1–4	Grimsby Town	Gillingham
15:00 BST	McCleary (yellow card) 24'; Hale 37'; Little (yellow card) 53'; Coleman (yellow card) 90'	Report	Rodgers 7'; Turi (yellow card) 43', (goal) 64'; Amaluzor (yellow card) 51'; Morgan 54' (pen.); Kacurri (yellow card) 62'; Finch 70', (yellow card) 89'	Stadium: MEMS Priestfield Stadium; Referee: Sam Mulhall

31 October 2026 14	Shrewsbury Town	1–2	Gillingham	Shrewsbury
15:00 GMT	Boyle (yellow card) 52'; Lloyd 59' (pen.); Hoole (yellow card) 82'	Report	Waldock 3'; Coleman (yellow card) 22'; Coleman (yellow card) 57'; Smith 80'; Little (yellow card) 87'	Stadium: The Croud Meadow; Attendance: 5,255; Referee: Neil Hair

14 November 2026 15	Colchester United	2–0	Gillingham	Colchester
15:00 GMT	Williams (yellow card) 26'; Payne 61' (pen.); Anderson 72'	Report	Dobbs (yellow card) 64'	Stadium: JobServe Community Stadium; Attendance: 5,548 (1,255 Gillingham fans); Referee: Lewis Sandoe

21 November 2026 16	Gillingham	3–3	Crewe Alexandra	Gillingham
12:30 GMT	Hale 22' (pen.), 40' (pen.), (yellow card) 54'; Little (yellow card) 90+2'; McCleary 90+6'	Report	McManus 4' (o.g.); Thomas (yellow card) 21'; McNeill 61' (pen.); Agius 74'; March (yellow card) 90+2'	Stadium: MEMS Priestfield Stadium; Attendance: 5,043 (171 away); Referee: Declan Bourne
Note: Fixture was initially scheduled for a 15:00 kick-off, but was brought forward for live Sky Sports broadcasting.

28 November 2026 17	Salford City	v	Gillingham	Kersal
15:00 GMT				Stadium: The Peninsula Stadium

1 December 2026 18	Gillingham	v	Swindon Town	Gillingham
19:45 GMT				Stadium: MEMS Priestfield Stadium

12 December 2026 19	Oldham Athletic	v	Gillingham	Oldham
15:00 GMT				Stadium: Boundary Park

19 December 2026 20	Gillingham	v	Cheltenham Town	Gillingham
15:00 GMT				Stadium: MEMS Priestfield Stadium

26 December 2026 21	Crawley Town	v	Gillingham	Crawley
15:00 GMT				Stadium: Broadfield Stadium

29 December 2026 22	Gillingham	v	Barnet	Gillingham
19:45 GMT				Stadium: MEMS Priestfield Stadium

2 January 2027 23	Gillingham	v	Exeter City	Gillingham
15:00 GMT				Stadium: MEMS Priestfield Stadium
Note: Fixture was initially scheduled for 1 January, but was pushed back 24 hours following an agreement with both sides and the English Football League.

9 January 2027 24	Cheltenham Town	v	Gillingham	Cheltenham
15:00 GMT				Stadium: EV Charger Points Stadium

16 January 2027 25	Gillingham	v	Accrington Stanley	Gillingham
15:00 GMT				Stadium: MEMS Priestfield Stadium

19 January 2027 26	Port Vale	v	Gillingham	Burslem
19:45 GMT				Stadium: Vale Park

23 January 2027 27	Grimsby Town	v	Gillingham	Cleethorpes
15:00 GMT				Stadium: Blundell Park

30 January 2027 28	Gillingham	v	Shrewsbury Town	Gillingham
15:00 GMT				Stadium: MEMS Priestfield Stadium

6 February 2027 29	Northampton Town	v	Gillingham	Sixfields
15:00 GMT				Stadium: Sixfields Stadium

9 February 2027 30	Gillingham	v	Chesterfield	Gillingham
19:45 GMT				Stadium: MEMS Priestfield Stadium

13 February 2027 31	Gillingham	v	Rochdale	Gillingham
15:00 GMT				Stadium: MEMS Priestfield Stadium

20 February 2027 32	Tranmere Rovers	v	Gillingham	Birkenhead
15:00 GMT				Stadium: Prenton Park

27 February 2027 33	Gillingham	v	Colchester United	Gillingham
12:30 GMT				Stadium: MEMS Priestfield Stadium
Note: Fixture was initially scheduled for a 15:00 kick-off, but was brought forward for live Sky Sports broadcasting.

=== FA Cup ===
Gillingham were drawn at home to Barrow in the first round.

Win Draw Loss Fixtures

7 November 2026 First round	Gillingham	0–1	Barrow	Gillingham
15:00 GMT	Hale (yellow card) 90+6'	Report	Cameron (yellow card) 80', (goal) 90+2'	Stadium: MEMS Priestfield Stadium; Attendance: 4,125 (187 away); Referee: Harry Wager

=== EFL Cup ===
Gillingham were drawn at home to Luton Town in the first round.

Win Draw Loss Fixtures

8 August 2026 First round	Gillingham	0–3	Luton Town	Gillingham
15:00 BST	Albarus (yellow card) 49'	Report	Wells 43'; Benagr 59'; Kodua 78'; Morris (yellow card) 88'	Stadium: Priestfield Stadium; Attendance: 4,015 (842 away); Referee: Stephen Parkinson

=== EFL Trophy ===
==== Group stage ====
Gillingham were drawn against Cambridge United, Northampton Town and Brighton & Hove Albion U21 into Southern Group G.

Pos	Div	Team	Pld	W	PW	PL	L	GF	GA	GD	Pts	Qualification
1	L1	Cambridge United	3	3	0	0	0	12	2	+10	9	Advance to Round 2
2	L2	Gillingham	3	2	0	0	1	7	8	−1	6	Advance to Round 2
3	ACA	Brighton & Hove Albion U21	3	1	0	0	2	6	10	−4	3	
4	L2	Northampton Town	3	0	0	0	3	2	7	−5	0	

Source: EFL

Win Draw Loss Fixtures

22 September 2026 Group stage	Gillingham	1–4	Cambridge United	Gillingham
19:00 BST	Dayal 31'; Daley (yellow card) 64'	Report	Bradshaw 24'; Mpanzu 34', (yellow card) 59'; Appéré 57'; Herd (yellow card) 78'; Heath 87' (pen.)	Stadium: MEMS Priestfield Stadium; Attendance: 911 (109 away); Referee: George Laflin

13 October 2026 Group stage	Gillingham	4–3	Brighton & Hove Albion U21	Gillingham
19:00 BST	Eaves 32' (pen.); Dack 39'; Coleman (yellow card) 30', (goal) 45+1'; Dayal 49'; Dobbs (yellow card) 79'		Oriola (yellow card) 25'; Nti 51', 70'; Silsby 90+4'	Stadium: MEMS Priestfield Stadium; Referee: Richard Eley

10 November 2026 Group stage	Northampton Town	1–2	Gillingham	Sixfields
19:00 GMT	List 47'	Report	Sillah 12'; Antwi 54'	Stadium: Sixfields Stadium; Attendance: 667 (70 Gillingham supporters); Referee: Alex Chilowicz

== Statistics ==
=== Appearances and goals ===
As of match played 21 November 2026

Players with no appearances are not included on the list; italics indicate a loaned in player

No.	Pos	Nat	Player	Total		League Two		FA Cup		EFL Cup		EFL Trophy	
No.	Pos	Nat	Player	Apps	Goals	Apps	Goals	Apps	Goals	Apps	Goals	Apps	Goals
1	GK	(England) ENG	Ollie Wright	16	0	14+0	0	1+0	0	0+0	0	1+0	0
3	DF	(Republic of Ireland) IRL	Conor McManus	11	1	8+1	1	0+0	0	0+1	0	0+1	0
4	DF	(Scotland) SCO	Liam Gordon	1	0	1+0	0	0+0	0	0+0	0	0+0	0
5	DF	(England) ENG	Andy Smith	20	1	15+1	1	0+0	0	1+0	0	3+0	0
6	MF	(England) ENG	Ethan Coleman	10	1	3+3	0	1+0	0	0+0	0	2+1	1
7	FW	(England) ENG	Kadeem Harris	3	0	2+0	0	0+0	0	1+0	0	0+0	0
8	MF	(England) ENG	Armani Little	11	0	6+3	0	0+1	0	0+0	0	0+1	0
9	FW	(England) ENG	Will Goodwin	9	0	5+2	0	0+0	0	0+1	0	0+1	0
10	FW	(Northern Ireland) NIR	Ronan Hale	20	8	15+1	8	1+0	0	1+0	0	1+1	0
11	FW	(The Gambia) GAM	Lamin Sillah	13	2	7+4	1	1+0	0	0+0	0	1+0	1
12	FW	(Jamaica) JAM	Garath McCleary	17	1	3+10	1	0+1	0	0+0	0	2+1	0
13	GK	(England) ENG	Taite Holtam	1	0	0+0	0	0+0	0	0+0	0	1+0	0
14	MF	(England) ENG	Robbie McKenzie	15	0	10+2	0	1+0	0	1+0	0	1+0	0
15	MF	(England) ENG	Zane Albarus	7	0	4+1	0	0+0	0	1+0	0	1+0	0
16	MF	(England) ENG	James Brophy	20	3	16+0	3	1+0	0	1+0	0	2+0	0
17	MF	(England) ENG	Cameron Antwi	6	1	0+4	0	0+0	0	0+0	0	1+1	1
18	FW	(Guyana) GUY	Sheldon Kendall	16	2	1+10	2	0+1	0	0+1	0	2+1	0
19	DF	(Grenada) GRN	Omar Beckles	19	1	16+0	1	1+0	0	1+0	0	1+0	0
20	DF	(England) ENG	Jack Daley	13	0	2+7	0	1+0	0	0+0	0	3+0	0
22	MF	(England) ENG	Nick Freeman	19	0	16+0	0	1+0	0	1+0	0	1+0	0
23	MF	(England) ENG	Bradley Dack	7	1	0+5	0	0+0	0	0+0	0	1+1	1
24	MF	(England) ENG	Harry Waldock	16	1	12+2	1	1+0	0	0+1	0	0+0	0
26	DF	(England) ENG	Logan Dobbs	17	1	12+1	1	1+0	0	1+0	0	1+1	0
27	MF	(England) ENG	Michael Luxton	5	0	0+3	0	0+0	0	0+0	0	2+0	0
28	FW	(England) ENG	Damien Theodore	1	0	0+0	0	0+0	0	0+0	0	0+1	0
29	DF	(England) ENG	Harry Webster	3	0	0+1	0	0+0	0	0+0	0	2+0	0
30	FW	(England) ENG	Sullivan Booth	3	0	0+0	0	0+0	0	0+1	0	0+2	0
31	MF	(England) ENG	Cruz Beszant	1	0	0+0	0	0+0	0	0+0	0	0+1	0
32	MF	(England) ENG	Louie Dayal	4	2	0+1	0	0+0	0	0+0	0	2+1	2
34	MF	(Wales) WAL	Eli King	4	0	3+1	0	0+0	0	0+0	0	0+0	0
35	MF	(Kenya) KEN	Zech Obiero	1	0	1+0	0	0+0	0	0+0	0	0+0	0
39	FW	(England) ENG	Tom Eaves	8	2	1+6	1	0+0	0	0+0	0	1+0	1
40	GK	(England) ENG	Rohan Luthra	1	0	0+0	0	0+0	0	0+0	0	1+0	0
Player(s) who featured but departed the club permanently during the season:
11	FW	(England) ENG	Seb Palmer-Houlden	2	0	0+1	0	0+0	0	1+0	0	0+0	0
40	GK	(Republic of Ireland) IRL	Owen Mason	1	0	0+0	0	0+0	0	1+0	0	0+0	0
40	GK	(Australia) AUS	Ashley Maynard-Brewer	2	0	2+0	0	0+0	0	0+0	0	0+0	0

== Awards ==
=== Player awards ===
==== EFL League Two Player of the Month ====
Month	Player	Result	Ref.
September	(England) James Brophy	Nominated	

==== EFL League Two Goal of the Month ====
Month	Player	Opposition	Result	Ref.
September	(England) James Brophy	v. Rochdale	Won	

=== Manager awards ===
==== EFL League Two Manager of the Month ====
Month	Manager	Result	Ref.
September	(England) Gareth Ainsworth	Nominated	
