= 2025–26 Gillingham F.C. season =

English football club season

Gillingham
2025–26 season
- Owner: Brad Galinson
- Chairman: Brad Galinson
- Manager: Gareth Ainsworth
- Stadium: MEMS Priestfield Stadium
- League Two: 17th
- FA Cup: First Round
- EFL Cup: First Round
- EFL Trophy: Group Stage
- Top goalscorer: League: Bradley Dack (7); All: Bradley Dack (7)
- Highest home attendance: 7,406 vs Harrogate Town Harrogate Town (27 September 2025)
- Lowest home attendance: 962 vs Fulham U21s (2 September 2025)
- Average home league attendance: 6,353
- Biggest win: 4–1 vs Chesterfield (H) (19 August 2025)
- Biggest defeat: 6-2 vs Barnet (A) (25 April 2026)

The 2025–26 season was the 133rd season in the history of Gillingham Football Club and their fourth consecutive season in League Two. In addition to the domestic league, the club also participated in the FA Cup, the EFL Cup, and the EFL Trophy.

== Players ==
=== Squad ===
As of 23 March 2026

Note: Flags indicate national team as defined under FIFA eligibility rules; some limited exceptions apply. Players may hold more than one non-FIFA nationality.

No.	Pos.	Nation	Player
1	GK	ENG	Glenn Morris
2	DF	ENG	Remeao Hutton
3	DF	ENG	Max Clark
4	DF	IRL	Conor Masterson
5	DF	ENG	Andy Smith
6	MF	ENG	Ethan Coleman
7	MF	JAM	Garath McCleary
8	MF	ENG	Armani Little (captain)
9	FW	ENG	Josh Andrews
10	MF	WAL	Jonny Williams
11	MF	ENG	Aaron Rowe
12	FW	ENG	Seb Palmer-Houlden
14	MF	ENG	Robbie McKenzie
15	DF	ENG	Travis Akomeah
16	DF	ENG	Harry Webster
17	MF	ENG	Jonny Smith
18	FW	CYP	Marcus Wyllie
19	FW	WAL	Sam Vokes

No.	Pos.	Nation	Player
20	FW	ENG	Elliott Nevitt
21	MF	NIR	Euan Williams
22	DF	IRL	Shadrach Ogie
23	MF	ENG	Bradley Dack
24	MF	ENG	Harry Waldock
25	GK	ENG	Jake Turner
26	MF	ENG	Stanley Skipper
27	MF	MAW	Nelson Khumbeni
29	FW	ENG	Harry Bridle
30	DF	ENG	Sam Gale
31	DF	ENG	Logan Dobbs
32	DF	MSR	Lenni Cirino
33	FW	ENG	Cruz Beszant
34	FW	ENG	Stan Sargent
35	MF	ENG	Louie Dayal
36	MF	ENG	Cameron Antwi
38	FW	NIR	Ronan Hale
39	DF	ENG	Omar Beckles

== Transfers ==
=== In ===
No.	Pos.	Player	Transferred From	Fee	Date	Source
12	FW	(England) Seb Palmer-Houlden	(England) Bristol City	Undisclosed	1 June 2025	
5	DF	(England) Andy Smith	(England) Hull City	Undisclosed	25 June 2025	
19	FW	(Wales) Sam Vokes	(England) Wycombe Wanderers	Free Transfer	1 July 2025	
32	DF	(Montserrat) Lenni Cirino	(England) Clitheroe	Free Transfer	28 July 2025	
7	FW	(Jamaica) Garath McCleary	(England) Wycombe Wanderers	Free Transfer	1 September 2025	
36	MF	(England) Cameron Antwi	(Wales) Newport County	Undisclosed	23 January 2026	
38	FW	(Northern Ireland) Ronan Hale	(Scotland) Ross County	£250,000	29 January 2026	
39	DF	(Grenada) Omar Beckles	(England) Leyton Orient	Free	2 February 2026	

=== Out ===
No.	Pos.	Player	Transferred to	Fee	Date	Source
31	DF	(England) Alex Giles	(England) Chatham Town	End of Contract	30 June 2025	
12	FW	(England) Oliver Hawkins	(England) Barnet	End of Contract	30 June 2025	
-	FW	(England) Ashley Nadesan	(England) Sutton United	End of Contract	30 June 2025	
35	FW	(Scotland) Joshua Bayliss	Unattached	End of Contract	30 June 2025	
17	MF	(England) Jayden Clarke	(England) Forest Green Rovers	End of Contract	30 June 2025	
38	MF	(France) Timothée Dieng	(England) Dagenham & Redbridge	End of Contract	30 June 2025	
5	DF	(Germany) Max Ehmer	(England) Ebbsfleet United	End of Contract	30 June 2025	
7	FW	(England) Jack Nolan	Unattached	Mutual Consent	1 September 2025	
17	FW	(England) Joe Gbodé	(England) Luton Town	£300,000	1 September 2025	

=== Loaned in ===
No.	Pos.	Player	Loaned From	Until	Date	Source
15	CB	(England) Travis Akomeah	(England) Watford	31 May 2026 (Note: On 21 January, Akomeah's loan was extended until the end of the season)	1 September 2025	
17	MF	(England) Jonny Smith	(England) Wigan Athletic	31 May 2026	1 September 2025	

=== Loaned out ===
No.	Pos.	Player	Loaned to	Until	Date	Source
13	GK	(England) Taite Holtam	(England) Ashford United	1 November 2025 (Note: On 1 November, Holtam was recalled from his season-long loan at Ashford)	31 July 2025	
31	DF	(England) Logan Dobbs	(England) Welling United	29 October 2025 (Note: On 29 October, Dobbs was recalled from his loan at Welling)	1 August 2025	
16	DF	(England) Harry Webster	(England) Ramsgate		1 August 2025	
28	FW	(England) Damien Theodore	(England) Burgess Hill Town	3 September 2025	6 August 2025	
24	FW	(England) Harry Waldock	(England) Whitehawk	19 September 2025 (Note: On 19 September, Waldock was recalled from his loan at Whitehawk and subsequently joined Cray on loan.)	9 August 2025	
29	FW	(England) Harry Bridle	(England) Whitehawk	1 January 2026	9 August 2025	
24	MF	(England) Harry Waldock	(England) Cray Wanderers	13 December 2025	20 September 2025	
	MF	(England) Ben Clark	(England) Sheppey United	4 October 2025	1 November 2025	
28	FW	(England) Damien Theodore	(England) Hassocks	4 October 2025	1 November 2025	
31	DF	(England) Logan Dobbs	(England) Tonbridge Angels	27 November 2025 (Note: On 27 November, Dobbs was recalled from his loan at Tonbridge)	31 October 2025	
	DF	(England) Jonah Walker	(England) Welling United	29 November 2025	1 November 2025	
31	DF	(England) Logan Dobbs	(England) Ramsgate	31 May 2026	6 January 2026	
28	FW	(England) Damien Theodore	(England) Hastings United	31 May 2026	8 January 2026	
	FW	(England) Harry Bridle	(England) Cray Wanderers	26 February 2026 (Note: On 26 February, Bridle was recalled from his loan at Cray Wanderers)	9 January 2026	
13	GK	(England) Taite Holtam	(England) Cray Valley Paper Mills	31 May 2026	21 January 2026	
20	FW	(England) Elliott Nevitt	(England) Cambridge United	31 May 2026	23 January 2026	
—	MF	(England) Louie Dayal	(England) Sheppey United		13 February 2026	
—	MF	(England) Michael Luxton	(England) Sheppey United		13 February 2026	
33	MF	(England) Cruz Beszant	(England) Ashford United		14 February 2026	
18	FW	(Cyprus) Marcus Wyllie	(England) Ebbsfleet United	31 May 2026	23 February 2026	
33	MF	(England) Cruz Beszant	(England) Sheppey United	31 May 2026	26 March 2026	
—	MF	(England) Louie Dayal	(England) Sheppey United	31 May 2026	26 March 2026	

== Pre-season and friendlies ==
On 12 May, Gillingham announced their first two pre-season friendlies, against Ebbsfleet United and Chatham Town. A Gills XI would also take on Sheppey United. A fourth match was later confirmed, away to Dover Athletic. On 29 May, a further two friendlies was confirmed, against Dartford and Reading. A further fixture against Luton Town was later announced.

Win Draw Loss Fixtures

8 July 2025 Friendly	Dover Athletic	0–1	Gillingham	River
19:30 BST		Report	McKenzie 45+2'	Stadium: Crabble Athletic Ground; Attendance: 1,225; Referee: Isaac Searle

12 July 2025 Friendly	Gillingham	0–0	Reading	Gillingham
15:00 BST		Report		Stadium: Priestfield Stadium; Attendance: 1,930 (384 away fans); Referee: Harry Wager

16 July 2025 Friendly	Southampton	4–1	Gillingham	Marchwood
12:00 BST		Report		Stadium: Staplewood Campus; Attendance: 0 (behind-closed-doors)

18 July 2025 Friendly	Sheppey United	2–2	Gillingham XI	Isle of Sheppey
19:30 BST	Lambert 45'; Hatton 54'		Beszant 5'; Mhlanga 20'	Stadium: Holm Park

19 July 2025 Friendly	Gillingham	0–2	Luton Town	Gillingham
15:00 BST		Report	Clark 29', 38'	Stadium: Priestfield Stadium; Attendance: 1,967 (333 away fans); Referee: Isaac Searle

22 July 2025 Friendly	Ebbsfleet United	2–1	Gillingham	Northfleet
19:00 BST	Peake 23'; Samuel 74' (pen.)	Report	Gbode 79'	Stadium: Stonebridge Road; Attendance: 916

25 July 2025 Friendly	Chatham Town	1–0	Gillingham	Chatham
19:45 BST	Folarin 40'	Report		Stadium: The Bauvill Stadium

26 July 2025 Friendly	Dartford	0–2	Gillingham	Dartford
15:00 BST		Report	Gbode 4', 35'	Stadium: Princes Park; Attendance: 1,037; Referee: Joe Dann-Pye

== Competitions ==
=== Overall record ===
Competition	Starting round	Final position	Record							
Competition	Starting round	Final position	Pld	W	D	L	GF	GA	GD	Win %
EFL League Two	Matchday 1	17th	46	13	14	19	53	72	−19	28.26
FA Cup	First round	First round	1	0	1	0	2	2	+0	0.00
EFL Cup	First round	First round	1	0	1	0	1	1	+0	0.00
EFL Trophy	Group Stage	Group Stage	3	1	0	2	5	6	−1	33.33
Total			51	14	16	21	61	81	−20	27.45

Last updated: 2 May 2026
Source: Soccerway

=== League Two ===
==== League table ====
Pos	Team	Pld	W	D	L	GF	GA	GD	Pts
15	Fleetwood Town	46	15	16	15	57	58	−1	61
16	Accrington Stanley	46	14	11	21	47	58	−11	53
17	Gillingham	46	13	14	19	53	72	−19	53
18	Cheltenham Town	46	14	10	22	53	79	−26	52
19	Shrewsbury Town	46	13	10	23	42	69	−27	49

Source: EFL Official Website
Rules for classification: 1) Points; 2) Goal difference; 3) Number of goals scored; 4) Head-to-head results; 5) Wins; 6) Away goals; 7) Penalty points (sec 9.5); 8) 12-point sending off offences

==== League results summary ====
Overall								Home						Away					
Pld	W	D	L	GF	GA	GD	Pts	W	D	L	GF	GA	GD	W	D	L	GF	GA	GD
46	13	14	19	53	72	−19	53	8	7	8	29	36	−7	5	7	11	24	36	−12

Last updated: complete.
Source: Soccerway

==== League results by round ====
Round	1	2	3	4	5	6	7	8	9	10	11	12	13	14	15	16	17	18	19	20	21	22	23	24	27	28	30	25^{1}	31	32	33	34	35	36	26^{2}	37	38	39	40	41	42	43	29^{3}	44	45	46
Ground	A	H	A	H	H	A	A	H	A	H	A	H	A	H	A	H	H	A	A	H	A	H	H	A	H	A	H	A	H	A	A	H	A	H	H	A	H	H	A	A	H	A	A	H	A	H
Result	D	W	D	W	W	W	D	W	W	L	L	D	L	L	W	D	D	D	D	D	L	D	D	L	W	W	L	L	W	L	L	L	W	D	L	L	L	L	L	D	W	D	L	L	L	W
Position	11	10	13	6	5	1	1	2	1	3	4	3	5	8	7	7	7	8	6	10	12	12	11	16	14	12	14	14	14	14	14	16	16	16	16	16	16	16	17	17	17	17	17	18	18	17
Points	1	4	5	8	11	14	15	18	21	21	21	22	22	22	25	26	27	28	29	30	30	31	32	32	35	38	38	38	41	41	41	41	44	45	45	45	45	45	45	46	49	50	50	50	50	53

Source: EFL
A = Away; H = Home; W = Win; D = Draw; L = Loss; P = Postponed
Notes:
- ^{1} Matchday 25 (vs. Notts County) was postponed due to a frozen pitch.
- ^{2} Matchday 26 (vs. Milton Keynes Dons) was postponed due to opposition in FA Cup involvements.
- ^{3} Matchday 29 (vs. Cheltenham Town) was postponed due to a waterlogged pitch.

==== Matches ====
On 26 June, the League Two fixtures were released.

Win Draw Loss Fixtures

2 August 2025 1	Accrington Stanley	1–1	Gillingham	Accrington
15:00 BST	Matthews (yellow card) 49'; Grant (yellow card) 66'; Walton 66'	Report	Gbode (yellow card) 14'; Ogie (yellow card) 61'; Little 79'	Stadium: Crown Ground; Attendance: 2,302 (610 Gillingham fans); Referee: Ollie Yates

9 August 2025 2	Gillingham	1–0	Walsall	Gillingham
15:00 BST	Morris (yellow card) 34'; Dack 58'; Andrews (yellow card) 75'; Coleman (yellow card) 90+6'	Report	Jellis (yellow card) 55'; Stuttle (yellow card) 56'; Clarke (yellow card) 90+1'	Stadium: MEMS Priestfield Stadium; Attendance: 6,498 (372 away fans); Referee: Ross Martin

16 August 2025 3	Tranmere Rovers	1–1	Gillingham	Birkenhead
15:00 BST	Patrick 63'; Smallwood (yellow card) 77'; Norman (yellow card) 90+4'	Report	Dack (yellow card) 21'; Nevitt (yellow card) 39'; Clark (yellow card) 86' (yellow-red card) 90+4'; Gbodé 90+2'	Stadium: Prenton Park; Attendance: 6,981 (426 Gillingham fans); Referee: Declan Bourne

19 August 2025 4	Gillingham	4–1	Chesterfield	Gillingham
19:45 BST	Little 28' (pen.), 50' (pen.); Andrews (yellow card) 37'; Cirino (yellow card) 45+1', (goal) 56'; Coleman (yellow card) 71'; Nevitt (yellow card) 73'; Wyllie 90+1'	Report	Dobra 53'; Daley-Campbell (yellow card) 62'	Stadium: MEMS Priestfield Stadium; Attendance: 5,518 (281 away fans); Referee: Craig Hicks

23 August 2025 5	Gillingham	1–0	Crewe Alexandra	Gillingham
15:00 BST	Gale (yellow card) 4', (goal) 89'; Cirino (yellow card) 66'	Report	Hutchinson (yellow card) 23'; Demetriou (yellow card) 50'	Stadium: MEMS Priestfield Stadium; Attendance: 6,089 (234 away fans); Referee: Abigail Byrne

30 August 2025 6	Oldham Athletic	0–1	Gillingham	Oldham
15:00 BST	Quigley (yellow card) 1'; Hannant (yellow card) 20'; Woods (yellow card) 28'; Robson (yellow card) 89'; Monthé (yellow card) 90+1'	Report	Dack (yellow card) 24'; Gale (yellow card) 55'; Vokes 71'; Gbodé (yellow card) 79'	Stadium: Boundary Park; Attendance: 6,233 (549 Gillingham fans); Referee: Scott Jackson

6 September 2025 7	Bromley	2–2	Gillingham	Bromley
17:30 BST	Kabamba 7', (yellow card) 67'; Cheek 12'; Charles (yellow card) 90+12'	Report	Nevitt (yellow card) 45'; Andrews 56'; Gale (yellow card) 84'; Clark 90+8' (pen.)	Stadium: Hayes Lane; Attendance: 3,005 (481 Gillingham fans); Referee: James Durkin
Note: Fixture was originally scheduled for a 15:00 kick-off, but was moved live Sky Sports broadcasting.

13 September 2025 8	Gillingham	1–0	Notts County	Gillingham
15:00 BST	Andrews (yellow card) 36', (goal) 46'; Smith (yellow card) 65'; Nevitt (yellow card) 75'; Dack (yellow card) 90+3'	Report	Dennis (yellow card) 15'	Stadium: Priestfield Stadium; Attendance: 6,743; Referee: Sam Mulhall

20 September 2025 9	Newport County	1–3	Gillingham	Newport
15:00 BST	Opoku 1'; Antwi (penalty missed) 9'; Reindorf (yellow card) 15'; Baker (yellow card) 44'		Smith (yellow card) 5'; Dack 23', 45' (pen.); Andrews (yellow card) 30'; Smith 36'; Rowe (yellow card) 85'; Gale (yellow card) 90+4'	Stadium: Rodney Parade; Attendance: 4,022 (601 Gillingham fans); Referee: Leigh Doughty

27 September 2025 10	Gillingham	0–1	Harrogate Town	Gillingham
15:00 BST	Clark (yellow card) 84'	Report	Duke-McKenna 16'; Taylor (yellow card) 50'	Stadium: Priestfield Stadium; Attendance: 7,406 (85 away fans); Referee: James Bell

4 October 2025 11	Milton Keynes Dons	3–2	Gillingham	Denbigh
12:30 BST	Gale 6' (o.g.); Mendez-Laing 57'; Maguire (yellow card) 63'; Paterson 69'; Leko (yellow card) 90+3'	Report	Smith (yellow card) 34'; Hutton (yellow card) 60'; Andrews (yellow card) 63'; Palmer-Houlden 76'; Williams 90+4'	Stadium: Stadium MK; Attendance: 7,646 (1,375 Gillingham fans); Referee: Darren Drysdale
Note: Fixture was originally scheduled for a 15:00 kick-off, but was rescheduled for live Sky Sports broadcasting.

11 October 2025 12	Gillingham	1–1	Cheltenham Town	Gillingham
15:00 BST	Nevitt 90+5'	Report	Martin (yellow card) 57'; Young (yellow card) 60'; Sherring 87'	Stadium: Priestfield Stadium; Attendance: 6,038 (143 away fans); Referee: Alex Chilowicz

18 October 2025 13	Grimsby Town	1–0	Gillingham	Cleethorpes
15:00 BST	Kabia (yellow card) 27'; Green (yellow card) 50'; Rodgers (yellow card) 55'; Vernam 58' (pen.)	Report	Hutton (red card) 33'; Williams (yellow card) 60' (yellow-red card) 63'; Little (yellow card) 66'; Coleman (yellow card) 66'; Gale (yellow card) 83'; Clark (yellow card) 84'	Stadium: Blundell Park; Attendance: 6,659 (489 Gillingham fans); Referee: Zac Kennard-Kettle

25 October 2025 14	Gillingham	1–2	Salford City	Gillingham
15:00 BST	Dack (penalty missed) 23', (yellow card) 57'; Andrews 36'; Coleman (yellow card) 66'	Report	Udoh 7', (yellow card) 56'; Cesay 27'; Woodburn (yellow card) 58'; Garbutt (yellow card) 72'; N'Mai (yellow card) 73'; Oluwo (yellow card) 85'	Stadium: Priestfield Stadium; Attendance: 6,174 (89 away fans); Referee: David Rock

8 November 2025 15	Bristol Rovers	0–1	Gillingham	Horfield
15:00 GMT	Sotiriou (yellow card) 32'	Report	Clark (penalty missed) 30', 54'; Andrews (yellow card) 31'; Nevitt (yellow card) 62'; McKenzie (yellow card) 90+1'; McCleary (yellow card) 90+1'	Stadium: Memorial Stadium; Attendance: 8,056 (1,053 Gillingham fans); Referee: Alan Young

15 November 2025 16	Gillingham	2–2	Crawley Town	Gillingham
17:30 GMT	Smith (yellow card) 27'; Dack 45+3'; McKenzie 55' (pen.)	Report	Brown (yellow card) 30'; Bajrami 52'; Tshimanga 82'; Flower (yellow card) 83'	Stadium: Priestfield Stadium; Attendance: 6,252 (395 away fans); Referee: Paul Howard
Note: Fixture was originally scheduled for a 15:00 kick-off, but was rescheduled for live Sky Sports broadcasting.

22 November 2025 17	Gillingham	1–1	Barnet	Gillingham
12:30 GMT	Dack 45+2'; Vokes (yellow card) 64'; Hutton (yellow card) 72'; Williams (yellow card) 74'; Khumbeni (yellow card) 90+4'	Report	Stead 17', (yellow card) 63'; Ofoborh (yellow card) 51'; Kanu (yellow card) 80'	Stadium: Priestfield Stadium; Attendance: 5,778 (406 away); Referee: Ben Atkinson
Note: Fixture was originally scheduled for a 15:00 kick-off, but was rescheduled for live Sky Sports broadcasting.

29 November 2025 18	Shrewsbury Town	3–3	Gillingham	Shrewsbury
15:00 GMT	Lloyd 10', 45+4'; Hoole 22'; Boyle (yellow card) 34'; Kabia (yellow card) 61'	Report	Stubbs 37' (o.g.); Andrews (yellow card) 57'; McKenzie 66' (pen.); Cirino (yellow card) 81'; Nevitt 86'	Stadium: New Meadow; Attendance: 5,217 (484 away); Referee: Aaron Farmer

6 December 2025 19	Colchester United	0–0	Gillingham	Colchester
12:30 GMT	Gape (yellow card) 90+4'	Report	Rowe (yellow card) 9'; Hutton (yellow card) 24'; Gale (yellow card) 77'; Ogie (yellow card) 90+3'	Stadium: Colchester Community Stadium; Attendance: 4,832 (839 Gillingham supporters); Referee: Oliver Mackey
Note: Fixture was initially scheduled for 9 December, but both clubs agreed to bring it forward as both clubs were knocked out of the FA Cup.

13 December 2025 20	Gillingham	2–2	Barrow	Gillingham
15:00 GMT	Earing 25' (o.g.); Rowe 28'	Report	Gordon 57', 83'; Hemmings (yellow card) 86'	Stadium: Priestfield Stadium; Attendance: 5,500 (76 away fans); Referee: Farai Hallam

20 December 2025 21	Fleetwood Town	2–1	Gillingham	Fleetwood
15:00 GMT	McCann (yellow card) 28'; Graydon (yellow card) 45+1', (goal) 53'; Potter (yellow card) 48'; Evans (penalty missed) 82'; Medley 85'	Report	Dack 14'; Little (yellow card) 52'; Nevitt (yellow card) 58'	Stadium: Highbury Stadium; Attendance: 3,001 (261 Gillingham fans); Referee: Stephen Parkinson

26 December 2025 22	Gillingham	1–1	Cambridge United	Gillingham
15:00 GMT	McKenzie (penalty missed) 72'; Clark 72'; Rowe (yellow card) 85'	Report	Appéré 10'	Stadium: Priestfield Stadium; Attendance: 7,344 (636 away); Referee: Neil Hair

29 December 2025 23	Gillingham	1–1	Colchester United	Gillingham
15:00 GMT	McKenzie 74'; Little (yellow card) 86'	Report	Lisbie (yellow card) 77'; Read 87' (pen.)	Stadium: Priestfield Stadium; Attendance: 7,284 (930 away); Referee: Matthew Russell

1 January 2026 24	Swindon Town	2–0	Gillingham	Swindon
15:00 GMT	Mabete (yellow card) 25'; Tafazolli 59'; Nichols (yellow card) 83'; Tabor (yellow card) 86'; Ripley (yellow card) 89'; Drinan 90+1'	Report	Andrews (yellow card) 60'; Clark (yellow card) 83'; Little (yellow card) 87'	Stadium: County Ground; Attendance: 9,986 (896 Gillingham supporters); Referee: James Durkin

17 January 2026 27	Gillingham	3–2	Newport County	Gillingham
15:00 GMT				Stadium: Priestfield Stadium

24 January 2026 28	Harrogate Town	0–3	Gillingham	Harrogate
15:00 GMT	Falkingham (yellow card) 6'	Report	Masterson 51'; Little 55' (pen.); Vokes 84'; Gale (yellow card) 90+1'	Stadium: Wetherby Road; Attendance: 2,747 (472 Gillingham supporters); Referee: Zac Kennard-Kettle

31 January 2026 30	Gillingham	1–4	Bromley	Gillingham
15:00 GMT	Little (yellow card) 6'; Dack 44'	Report	Thompson 10', 19', 48'; Whitely 27', (yellow card) 45+2'; Pinnock (yellow card) 27'; Medley (yellow card) 89'	Stadium: Priestfield Stadium; Attendance: 8,164 (1,313); Referee: Alan Young

3 February 2026 25	Notts County	1–0	Gillingham	Nottingham
19:45 GMT	Robertson 27'; Ness (yellow card) 76'	Report	Andrews (yellow card) 56'; Dack (yellow card) 81'; Beckles (yellow card) 86'	Stadium: Meadow Lane; Attendance: 8,731 (404 Gillingham supporters); Referee: Abigail Byrne
Note: Fixture was originally scheduled for 4 January, but it was postponed due to a frozen pitch.

7 February 2026 31	Gillingham	2–1	Tranmere Rovers	Gillingham
15:00 GMT	Hale 25', 65'	Report	Whitaker 78'	Stadium: Priestfield Stadium; Attendance: 5,564 (244 away); Referee: Craig Hicks

14 February 2026 32	Crewe Alexandra	1–0	Gillingham	Crewe
15:00 GMT	Thibaut 64'	Report	McKenzie (yellow card) 90+5'	Stadium: Gresty Road; Attendance: 4,972 (399 Gillingham supporters); Referee: Martin Coy

17 February 2026 33	Chesterfield	1–0	Gillingham	Chesterfield
19:45 GMT	Curtis 16'	Report	Beckles (yellow card) 23'; Hutton (yellow card) 31'; Coleman (yellow card) 88'	Stadium: SMH Group Stadium; Attendance: 7,520 (282 Gillingham supporters); Referee: Will Finnie

21 February 2026 34	Gillingham	0–3	Oldham Athletic	Gillingham
15:00 GMT	Akomeah (yellow card) 48'; Dack (yellow card) 68'	Report	Kavanagh 11'; Monthé 17'; Robson (yellow card) 36'; Kavanagh (yellow card) 45'; Fondop 78'	Stadium: Priestfield Stadium; Attendance: 5,868 (285 away); Referee: James Oldham

28 February 2026 35	Barrow	0–1	Gillingham	Barrow-in-Furness
15:00 GMT		Report	McKenzie 90+13'	Stadium: Holker Street; Attendance: 2,331 (237 Gillingham supporters); Referee: Ross Joyce

7 March 2026 36	Gillingham	1–1	Fleetwood Town	Gillingham
15:00 GMT	Ogie (yellow card) 40'; Palmer-Houlden 61'; Andrews (yellow card) 85'	Report	Helm (yellow card) 12'; Rooney 90+1'	Stadium: Priestfield Stadium; Attendance: 5,297 (69 away); Referee: Lewis Sandoe

10 March 2026 26	Gillingham	1–5	Milton Keynes Dons	Gillingham
19:45 GMT	Hale (yellow card) 44'; Rowe (yellow card) 60'; Palmer-Houlden 77'; Cirino (yellow card) 90+5'	Report	Gilbey 15'; Crowley (yellow card) 23'; Jones 26'; Ekpiteta 33'; Wiles 51'; Kelly 87'	Stadium: Priestfield Stadium; Attendance: 4,786 (186 away); Referee: Harry Wager
Note: Fixture was originally scheduled for 10 January, but it was postponed due to MK Dons in FA Cup involvements.

14 March 2026 37	Cambridge United	5–0	Gillingham	Cambridge
15:00 GMT	Ball 2'; Appéré 36'; Cirino 50' (o.g.); Kaikai 54'; Lavery 90+1'		Cirino (yellow card) 28'; Smith (yellow card) 42'; Dack (yellow card) 84'	Stadium: Abbey Stadium; Attendance: 7,490; Referee: Michael Barlow

17 March 2026 38	Gillingham	0–2	Swindon Town	Gillingham
19:45 GMT	Beckles (yellow card) 27'	Report	Wright (yellow card) 43'; Tafazolli (yellow card) 45'; Drinan 68', (yellow card) 77'; Holman 86'	Stadium: Priestfield Stadium; Attendance: 4,991; Referee: Emily Heaslip

21 March 2026 39	Gillingham F.C.	1–2	Bristol Rovers	Gillingham
15:00 GMT	Hale 16' (pen.); Waldock (yellow card) 35'; Hutton (yellow card) 71'; Little (yellow card) 89' (yellow-red card) 90+13'	Report	Leigh (yellow card) 34'; Kilgour (yellow card) 45' (goal) 46'; Harrison 72'; Young (yellow card) 90+10'	Stadium: Priestfield Stadium; Attendance: 5,764; Referee: Charles Breakspear

28 March 2026 40	Crawley Town	2–0	Gillingham	Crawley
15:00 GMT	Williams (yellow card) 79'; Richards 90+1'; Adeyemo 90+3'	Report	Dack (yellow card) 34'; Andrews (yellow card) 64'; Rowe (yellow card) 73'	Stadium: Broadfield Stadium; Attendance: 4,338 (909 Gillingham supporters); Referee: Edward Duckworth

3 April 2026 41	Walsall	2–2	Gillingham	Walsall
15:00 BST	Loupalo-Bi 21'; Kanu 66'	Report	Hale 50'; Dack (yellow card) 52'; Palmer-Houlden 63'; Gale (yellow card) 90+4'	Stadium: Bescot Stadium; Attendance: 5,994; Referee: William Davis

6 April 2026 42	Gillingham	2–0	Accrington Stanley	Gillingham
15:00 BST	Hale (yellow card) 11'; Khumbeni (yellow card) 24'; Smith 36'; McCleary (yellow card) 42', (goal) 56'	Report	Wright (yellow card) 11'; Woods (yellow card) 33'; Walton (yellow card) 75', (red card) 81'; Madden (yellow card) 80'; Abimbola (red card) 90+5'	Stadium: Priestfield Stadium; Attendance: 5,383 (59 away); Referee: George Laflin

11 April 2026 43	Salford City	0–0	Gillingham	Kersal
15:00 BST	Oluwo (yellow card) 75'	Report	Khumbeni (yellow card) 59'; Hale (yellow card) 75'	Stadium: Moor Lane; Attendance: 4,303 (522 Gills fans); Referee: Stephen Parkinson

14 April 2026 29	Cheltenham Town	2–1	Gillingham	Cheltenham
19:45 BST	Hutchinson 63'; Faal (yellow card) 74', (goal) 90+5'	Report	Hale 18'	Stadium: Whaddon Road; Attendance: 3,161 (235 Gills supporters); Referee: Harrison Blair
Note: Fixture was postponed due to a waterlogged pitch.

18 April 2026 44	Gillingham	1–4	Grimsby Town	Gillingham
15:00 BST	Little (yellow card) 45+3'; McCleary 55'; Hale (yellow card) 90+3'	Report	Cook 41'; Amaluzor (yellow card) 45'; Kabia 74'; Green 80'; Vernam 85'	Stadium: Priestfield Stadium; Attendance: 5,863 (646 away); Referee: Oliver Mackey

25 April 2026 45	Barnet	6–2	Gillingham	Edgware
15:00 BST	Stead 6', 15', 16', 30', 70'; Tshimanga (yellow card) 43'; Crichlow 45+4'; Shelton (yellow card) 74'	Report	Booth 13'; Masterson (yellow card) 37'; Andrews (yellow card) 83', (goal) 90+4'	Stadium: The Hive Stadium; Attendance: 3,704 (1,078 Gills supporters); Referee: Ollie Yates

2 May 2026 46	Gillingham	1–0	Shrewsbury Town	Gillingham
15:00 BST	Hale (yellow card) 37'; McCleary 90+2'	Report	Perry (yellow card) 31'; Gray (yellow card) 57'	Stadium: Priestfield Stadium; Attendance: 6,415 (541 away); Referee: David Rock

=== FA Cup ===
Gillingham were drawn away to Newport County in the first round.

Win Draw Loss Fixtures

1 November 2025 First round	Newport County	2–2 (4–3 p)	Gillingham	Newport
15:00 GMT	Evans 32'; Antwi 109'	Report	Nevitt 14'; Gale (yellow card) 25'; Palmer-Houlden 118'	Stadium: Rodney Parade; Attendance: 2,596 (243 Gillingham supporters); Referee: Ross Martin
	Penalties
	Baker-Richardson (penalty scored); Braybrooke (penalty missed); Antwi (penalty scored); Kamwa (penalty scored); Lloyd (penalty scored)		(penalty scored) Clark; (penalty missed) Hutton; (penalty missed) Vokes; (penalty scored) Khumbeni; (penalty scored) Palmer-Houlden

=== EFL Cup ===
Gillingham were drawn at home to AFC Wimbledon in the first round.

Win Draw Loss Fixtures

12 August 2025 First round	Gillingham	1–1 (2–4 p)	AFC Wimbledon	Gillingham
19:45 BST	Coleman 83'	Report	Hackford 32'; Sasu (yellow card) 42'; Johnson (yellow card) 80'	Stadium: Priestfield Stadium; Attendance: 2,205 (339 away fans); Referee: Neil Hair
	Penalties
	Clark (penalty scored); Williams (penalty missed); McKenzie (penalty scored); Andrews (penalty missed)		(penalty scored) Stevens; (penalty scored) Kelly; (penalty scored) Hippolyte; (penalty scored) Smith

=== EFL Trophy ===
Gillingham were drawn against Colchester United, Wycombe Wanderers and Fulham U21 in the group stage.

Pos	Div	Team	Pld	W	PW	PL	L	GF	GA	GD	Pts	Qualification
1	L2	Colchester United	3	3	0	0	0	6	2	+4	9	Advance to Round 2
2	L1	Wycombe Wanderers	3	2	0	0	1	7	3	+4	6	Advance to Round 2
3	L2	Gillingham	3	1	0	0	2	5	6	−1	3	
4	ACA	Fulham U21	3	0	0	0	3	2	9	−7	0	

Source: EFL

Win Draw Loss Fixtures

2 September 2025 Group G	Gillingham	4–1	Fulham U21	Gillingham
19:00 BST	Dobbs 3'; Rowe (yellow card) 34'; Beszant 48'; Wyllie 61'; Sargent 71'	Report	Loupalo-Bi (penalty missed) 53', 90+8'	Stadium: Priestfield Stadium; Attendance: 962 (48 away); Referee: Carl Brook

7 October 2025 Group G	Colchester United	2–1	Gillingham	Colchester
19:45 BST	Mbick 85'; Read 90+2'; Harvey (yellow card) 90+7'	Report	Vokes 15'; Clark (yellow card) 49'; Cirino (yellow card) 71' (yellow-red card) 87'; Waldock (yellow card) 80'	Stadium: Colchester Community Stadium; Attendance: 1,467 (132 Gillingham supporters); Referee: Matthew Russell

11 November 2025 Group G	Gillingham	0–3	Wycombe Wanderers	Gillingham
19:00 GMT	Akomeah (yellow card) 18'	Report	Lowry 9'; Matton 61'; Fink 84'	Stadium: Priestfield Stadium; Attendance: 906 (66 away); Referee: Abigail Byrne

== Statistics ==
=== Appearances and goals ===
Players with no appearances are not included on the list; italics indicate a loaned in player

No.	Pos	Nat	Player	Total		League Two		FA Cup		EFL Cup		EFL Trophy	
No.	Pos	Nat	Player	Apps	Goals	Apps	Goals	Apps	Goals	Apps	Goals	Apps	Goals
1	GK	(England) ENG	Glenn Morris	31	0	31+0	0	0+0	0	0+0	0	0+0	0
2	DF	(England) ENG	Remeao Hutton	48	0	40+3	0	1+0	0	1+0	0	3+0	0
3	DF	(England) ENG	Max Clark	46	3	39+2	3	1+0	0	1+0	0	2+1	0
4	DF	(Republic of Ireland) IRL	Conor Masterson	12	2	10+2	2	0+0	0	0+0	0	0+0	0
5	DF	(England) ENG	Andy Smith	38	1	35+1	1	1+0	0	1+0	0	0+0	0
6	MF	(England) ENG	Ethan Coleman	36	1	25+9	0	1+0	0	1+0	1	0+0	0
7	FW	(Jamaica) JAM	Garath McCleary	27	4	15+12	4	0+0	0	0+0	0	0+0	0
8	MF	(England) ENG	Armani Little	35	5	30+3	5	1+0	0	0+0	0	1+0	0
9	FW	(England) ENG	Josh Andrews	40	4	23+13	4	1+0	0	0+1	0	0+2	0
10	MF	(Wales) WAL	Jonny Williams	27	1	14+12	1	0+0	0	1+0	0	0+0	0
11	MF	(England) ENG	Aaron Rowe	30	1	13+13	1	0+1	0	0+0	0	2+1	0
12	FW	(England) ENG	Seb Palmer-Houlden	35	5	19+15	4	0+1	1	0+0	0	0+0	0
13	GK	(England) ENG	Taite Holtam	1	0	0+0	0	0+0	0	0+0	0	1+0	0
14	MF	(England) ENG	Robbie McKenzie	39	4	34+3	4	1+0	0	0+1	0	0+0	0
15	DF	(England) ENG	Travis Akomeah	17	0	8+5	0	0+1	0	0+0	0	3+0	0
16	DF	(England) ENG	Harry Webster	1	0	0+0	0	0+0	0	0+0	0	0+1	0
17	FW	(England) ENG	Jonny Smith	10	1	5+4	1	0+0	0	0+0	0	1+0	0
18	FW	(Cyprus) CYP	Marcus Wyllie	10	2	0+6	1	0+0	0	1+0	0	3+0	1
19	FW	(Wales) WAL	Sam Vokes	35	3	9+24	2	0+1	0	0+0	0	1+0	1
20	FW	(England) ENG	Elliott Nevitt	24	3	16+6	2	1+0	1	0+1	0	0+0	0
21	MF	(Northern Ireland) NIR	Euan Williams	4	0	2+2	0	0+0	0	0+0	0	0+0	0
22	DF	(Republic of Ireland) IRL	Shadrach Ogie	14	0	8+3	0	0+0	0	1+0	0	2+0	0
23	MF	(England) ENG	Bradley Dack	42	7	30+11	7	1+0	0	0+0	0	0+0	0
24	MF	(England) ENG	Harry Waldock	10	0	6+1	0	0+0	0	0+0	0	2+1	0
25	GK	(England) ENG	Jake Turner	20	0	15+1	0	1+0	0	1+0	0	2+0	0
27	MF	(Malawi) MAW	Nelson Khumbeni	22	0	7+10	0	0+1	0	1+0	0	2+1	0
29	FW	(England) ENG	Harry Bridle	1	0	0+0	0	0+0	0	0+0	0	0+1	0
30	DF	(England) ENG	Sam Gale	44	1	37+4	1	1+0	0	1+0	0	0+1	0
31	DF	(England) ENG	Logan Dobbs	3	1	0+0	0	0+0	0	0+0	0	3+0	1
32	DF	(Montserrat) MSR	Lenni Cirino	16	1	6+7	1	0+1	0	0+0	0	2+0	0
33	MF	(England) ENG	Cruz Beszant	4	1	0+1	0	0+0	0	0+0	0	3+0	1
34	FW	(England) ENG	Stan Sargent	3	1	0+0	0	0+0	0	0+1	0	0+2	1
35	MF	(England) ENG	Louie Dayal	4	0	0+1	0	0+0	0	0+0	0	0+3	0
36	MF	(England) ENG	Cameron Antwi	5	0	1+4	0	0+0	0	0+0	0	0+0	0
37	FW	(England) ENG	Sullivan Booth	1	1	1+0	1	0+0	0	0+0	0	0+0	0
38	FW	(Northern Ireland) NIR	Ronan Hale	20	5	19+1	5	0+0	0	0+0	0	0+0	0
39	DF	(Grenada) GRN	Omar Beckles	9	0	8+1	0	0+0	0	0+0	0	0+0	0
40	MF	(England) ENG	Michael Luxton	1	0	0+1	0	0+0	0	0+0	0	0+0	0
Player(s) who featured but departed the club during the season:
17	FW	(England) ENG	Joe Gbodé	5	1	2+2	1	0+0	0	1+0	0	0+0	0
