= Andy Smith (footballer, born 2001) =

English footballer (born 2001)

Personal information
- Full name: Andrew John Smith
- Date of birth: 11 September 2001 (age 25)
- Place of birth: Banbury, England
- Height: 1.92 m (6 ft 4 in)
- Position: Defender

Team information
- Current team: Gillingham
- Number: 5

Youth career
- 2011–2021: Hull City

Senior career*
Years	Team	Apps	(Gls)
2021–2025	Hull City	1	(0)
2021–2022	→ Salford City (loan)	0	(0)
2022	→ Grimsby Town (loan)	17	(1)
2022–2023	→ Grimsby Town (loan)	37	(1)
2024	→ Cheltenham Town (loan)	12	(0)
2025	→ Gillingham (loan)	12	(0)
2025–	Gillingham	52	(2)
- * Club domestic league appearances and goals as of 13:28, 22 November 2026 (UTC)

Andrew John Smith (born 11 September 2001) is an English professional footballer who plays as a defender for EFL League Two club Gillingham.

== Career ==
Smith was born in Banbury and grew up in the East Riding of Yorkshire. He began his career at Hull City in 2011, and made his first-team debut on 10 August 2021 in the EFL Cup. He moved on loan to Salford City later that month.

On 14 January 2022, Smith was recalled from his loan at Salford City by parent club Hull City and immediately loaned to Grimsby Town for the remainder of the season. Smith played the full 90 minutes of the 2022 National League play-off final as Grimsby beat Solihull Moors 2–1 at the London Stadium to return to the Football League.

On 28 July 2022, Smith signed a new two-year contract with Hull City, That same day Smith returned to Grimsby Town on a season-long loan deal.

Smith was part of the Grimsby team that reached the FA Cup quarter final for the first time since 1939, an unused substitute in the victory over Premier League side Southampton that secured that achievement, he did play the full 90 minutes of the quarter final defeat against Brighton & Hove Albion.

On 24 January 2024, Smith joined League One club Cheltenham Town on loan until the end of the season.

In February 2025 he moved on loan to Gillingham. In June of the same year, he rejoined Gillingham on a permanent contract.

== Career statistics ==
As of match played 21 November 2026.

Club	Season	League			FA Cup		EFL Cup		Other		Total	
Club	Season	Division	Apps	Goals	Apps	Goals	Apps	Goals	Apps	Goals	Apps	Goals
Hull City	2020–21	League One	0	0	0	0	0	0	1 (Note: Appearance(s) in EFL Trophy)	0	1	0
Hull City	2021–22	Championship	0	0	0	0	1	0	—		1	0
Hull City	2022–23	Championship	0	0	0	0	0	0	—		0	0
Hull City	2023–24	Championship	1	0	2	0	1	0	—		4	0
Hull City	2024–25	Championship	0	0	0	0	1	0	—		1	0
Hull City	Total		1	0	2	0	3	0	1	0	7	0
Salford City (loan)	2021–22	League Two	0	0	1	0	0	0	3	0	4	0
Grimsby Town (loan)	2021–22	National League	17	1	—		—		3 (Note: Appearance(s) in National League Play-offs)	0	20	1
Grimsby Town (loan)	2022–23	League Two	37	1	6	1	1	1	3	0	47	3
Cheltenham Town (loan)	2023–24	League One	12	0	—		—		—		12	0
Gillingham (loan)	2024–25	League Two	12	0	—		—		—		12	0
Gillingham	2025–26	League Two	36	1	1	0	1	0	0	0	38	1
Gillingham	2026–27	League Two	16	1	0	0	1	0	3	0	20	1
Gillingham	Total		52	2	1	0	2	0	3	0	58	2
Career total			131	4	10	1	6	1	13	0	160	6

== Honours ==
Grimsby Town

- National League play-offs: 2022
