= Conor McManus (footballer) =

English footballer

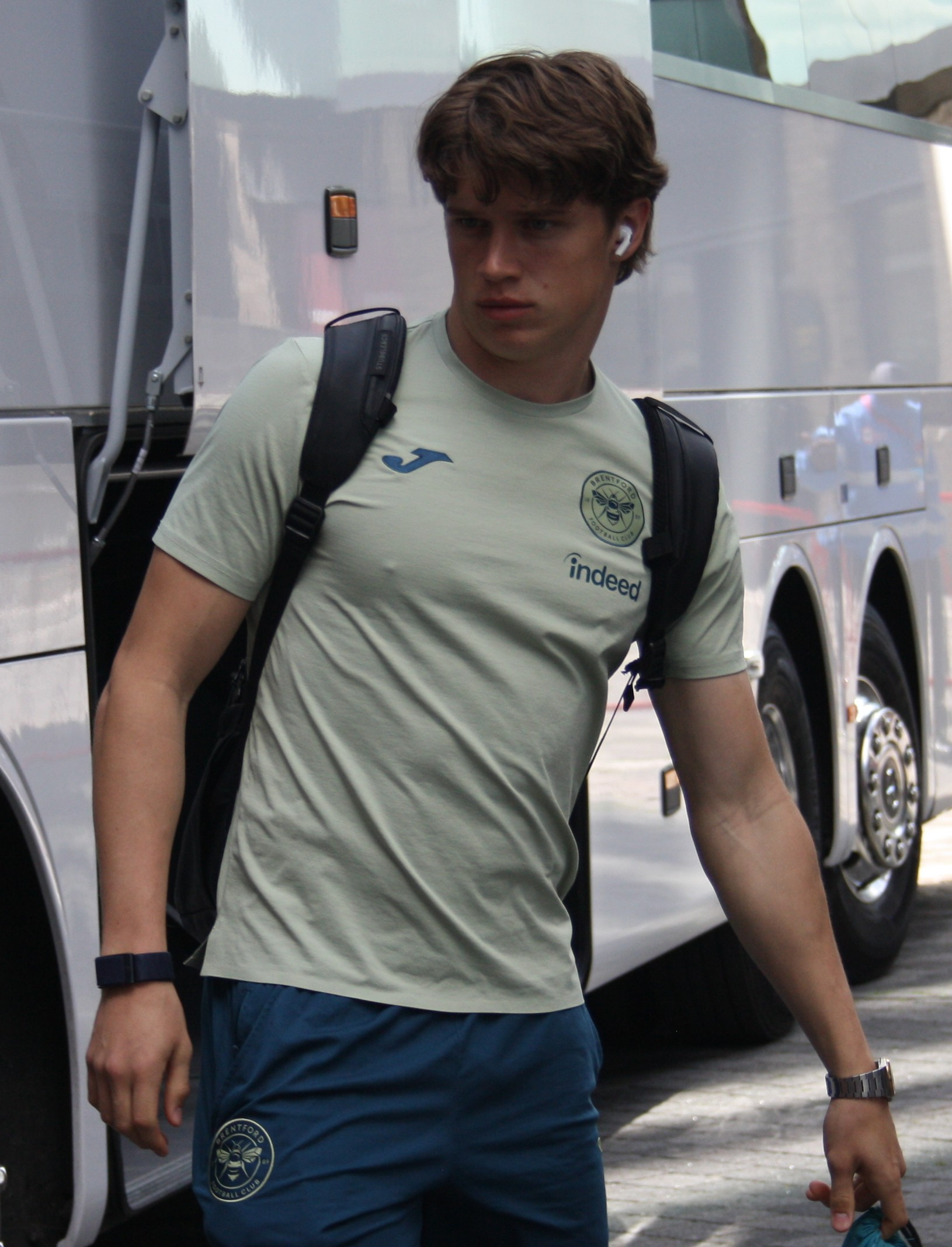
- McManus prior to a Brentford B match in April 2026

Personal information
- Full name: Conor James McManus
- Date of birth: 16 June 2004 (age 22)
- Place of birth: Ireland
- Height: 1.82 m (6 ft 0 in)
- Positions: Left back; central defender

Team information
- Current team: Gillingham
- Number: 3

Youth career
- –2021: Cabinteely
- 2021–2022: Bray Wanderers
- 2023–2026: Brentford

Senior career*
Years	Team	Apps	(Gls)
2022	Bray Wanderers	16	(0)
2026	Brentford	0	(0)
2026–	Gillingham	5	(1)

International career^{‡}
2025–2026	Republic of Ireland U21	8	(3)
- * Club domestic league appearances and goals as of 15:49, 26 September 2026 (UTC) ‡ National team caps and goals as of 00:09, 18 November 2026 (UTC)

Conor James McManus (born 16 June 2004) is an Irish professional footballer who plays as a left back for EFL League Two club Gillingham.

McManus is a product of the Cabinteely and Bray Wanderers youth systems and began his senior career at the latter club, before transferring to Brentford in 2023. After 3 1/2 years of B team football, McManus began his senior career with Gillingham in 2026. He has been capped by the Republic of Ireland at U21 level.

== Club career ==
=== Bray Wanderers ===
A left-sided full back or central defender, McManus began his career in the Cabinteely youth system at the age of four. He moved over to the Bray Wanderers U19 team when the two clubs merged in 2021. McManus progressed into the Bray Wanderers senior team and made 16 League of Ireland First Division appearances during the 2022 season. He departed the club in January 2023.

=== Brentford ===
In August 2022, McManus joined the B team at Premier League club Brentford on trial. He was successful and signed a pre-contract with the club on 15 December 2022, which triggered a 2 1/2 year contract, with the option of a further year, on 1 January 2023. On 1 January 2023, McManus transferred to Brentford for an undisclosed fee. He was mentored by fellow Irish defender Nathan Collins.

McManus was included in the first team squad for its 2024–25 pre-season training camp in Portugal and he made four friendly appearances during the period. Two quad injuries restricted McManus to 30 B team appearances during the 2024–25 season. Though he was not part of the 2024–25 Professional U21 Development League Final-winning matchday squad, McManus was awarded a medal for his contribution earlier in the tournament. He gained experience as midfielder during the season and was retained for 2025–26.

After recovering from a long-term injury, McManus resumed match play for the B team in October 2025. Mounting defensive injuries saw McManus win his maiden call into a competitive first team matchday squad for a Premier League match versus Leeds United on 21 March 2026. He remained an unused substitute during the 0–0 draw. During the B team season, McManus made 25 appearances and was part of the squad which finished as league phase champions of the 2025–26 Professional U21 Development League. He signed a new contract at the end of the season, but elected to transfer out of the club in August 2026.

=== Gillingham ===
On 3 August 2026, McManus transferred to League Two club Gillingham and signed an undisclosed-length contract for an undisclosed fee.

== International career ==
McManus won his maiden call into the Republic of Ireland U21 squad for a pair of friendlies in March 2025. He made his debut with a start in the second match versus Hungary and scored two goals in the 3–1 victory. McManus captained the team for the first time on his fourth cap in March 2026. On 6 October 2026, he scored his side's second goal in 3–1 victory over England U21 at Turners Cross in a must-win game that secured a Playoff spot for his side.

== Personal life ==
McManus grew up in Cabinteely. He completed his Leaving Cert remotely in 2023.

== Career statistics ==
As of match played 12 September 2026

Appearances and goals by club, season and competition
Club	Season	League			National cup (Note: Includes FAI Cup, FA Cup)		League cup (Note: Includes EFL Cup)		Other		Total	
Club	Season	Division	Apps	Goals	Apps	Goals	Apps	Goals	Apps	Goals	Apps	Goals
Bray Wanderers	2022	League of Ireland First Division	16	0	0	0	―		―		16	0
Brentford	2025–26	Premier League	0	0	0	0	0	0	―		0	0
Gillingham	2026–27	League Two	5	1	0	0	1	0	0	0	6	1
Career total			21	1	0	0	1	0	0	0	22	1
