= Bradley Dack =

English footballer (born 1993)

Personal information
- Full name: Bradley Paul Dack
- Date of birth: 31 December 1993 (age 32)
- Place of birth: Greenwich, England
- Height: 5 ft 9 in (1.75 m)
- Position: Attacking midfielder

Team information
- Current team: Gillingham
- Number: 23

Youth career
- Teviot Rangers
- Thamesmead Town
- Wimbledon
- 2005–2007: Charlton Athletic
- 2007: Corinthian
- 2007–2012: Gillingham

Senior career*
Years	Team	Apps	(Gls)
2012–2017	Gillingham	160	(31)
2012	→ Ramsgate (loan)	5	(2)
2013	→ Braintree Town (loan)	4	(1)
2017–2023	Blackburn Rovers	158	(50)
2023–2024	Sunderland	16	(1)
2024–	Gillingham	62	(8)
- * Club domestic league appearances and goals as of 09:06 9 October 2026 (UTC)

Bradley Paul Dack (born 31 December 1993) is an English professional footballer who plays as an attacking midfielder for Gillingham.

== Early life ==
Dack was born in the London Borough of Greenwich, and attended Beths Grammar School in Bexley.

== Career ==
=== Early career ===
Dack played youth football for Teviot Rangers and Thamesmead Town. At the age of seven, he was scouted by Wimbledon, where he trained for a year before joining their academy. After the relocation of the club to Milton Keynes, Dack chose to leave to join the academy of Charlton Athletic, where he spent three years before being released at the age of 14. Following his release, he returned to play youth football with Corinthian in the Kent Youth League.

=== Gillingham ===
Dack then joined Gillingham in 2008, beginning a three-year scholarship in 2010 before signing his first professional contract in May 2012. He had previously had a loan spell at Isthmian League Division One South side Ramsgate, who he had joined on loan in February 2012. He enjoyed a prolific pre-season in 2012 including a four-goal haul against Royal Engineers, which attracted attention from Gillingham manager Martin Allen, leading to his professional debut on 14 August 2012, in a 2–1 victory over Bristol City in the Football League Cup.

He made his league debut against Bradford City on 18 August 2012, being narrowly denied a late goal by the upright. He scored his first senior goal on 4 September 2012 in the Football League Trophy away to Crawley Town and signed a new three-year contract the following day.

Dack received his first red card as a professional for violent conduct against Southend United on 18 September 2012, having come on as substitute, after first winning a penalty.

On 3 January 2013, Dack moved on a one-month loan to Football Conference side Braintree Town. He was named as Gillingham's Young Player of the Season at the end of the 2012–13 season, having made 20 appearances for the club in all competitions, scoring 2 goals.

On 16 April 2014, Dack signed a new four-year deal keeping him contracted at Gillingham until June 2018.

He was named Gillingham's Young Player of the Year, Sponsor's Player of the Year and Players' Player of the Year at the conclusion of the 2014–15 season, having scored 10 goals in 50 appearances in all competitions.

In the 2015–16 season, Dack was Gillingham's top goalscorer, with 15 goals in 44 appearances in all competitions and 11 assists in the league. In the January 2016 transfer window, he was reportedly the subject of three bids, including one of £2 million, from Championship side Bristol City, but all three were rejected by the club.

At the 2015–16 Football League Awards, Dack won the League One Player of the Season award and was named in the Football League Team of the Season. The same season he was also named as Gillingham's Player of the Year, Young Player of the Year, Players' Player of the Year and Sponsor's Player of the Year.

In the 2016–17 season, he was named as Gillingham's Young Player of the Season for the third year running. He finished the season with 6 goals in 39 appearances.

=== Blackburn Rovers ===
On 27 June 2017, Dack joined Blackburn Rovers on a three-year deal for a fee of £750,000 plus add-ons. He played his first competitive game for the club in their 2–1 defeat by Southend United at Roots Hall on 5 August. Dack scored his first goal for Blackburn on 23 September, scoring an 85th-minute equaliser against Shrewsbury Town to secure a 1–1 draw away from home. Achieving promotion to the Championship in his first season with Blackburn, Dack finished as the club's top scorer, finding the back of the net on 18 occasions in 42 league appearances. His performances saw him win the club's Goal of the Season and Player of the Year award, whilst he was also named as the EFL League One Player of the Season.

With Blackburn achieving promotion back to the Championship, Dack found himself playing football in the second tier of English football for the first time in his career. Despite the step up in level, Dack continued to display his talent, finishing as the club's top scorer for the second season in a row, with 18 goals in all competitions, 15 of which came in the Championship.

On 23 December 2019, Dack, in Blackburn's Championship fixture at home against Wigan Athletic, was substituted off in the 68th after an innocuous challenge from Sam Morsy led to Dack going down clutching his right knee. Days later, the club confirmed that, following a scan, Dack had suffered an anterior cruciate ligament injury. Following the news, manager Tony Mowbray commented, "[he] will miss the rest of the season as well as maybe a month or two of next season."

On 3 November 2020, Dack returned to training for the first time in nearly a year, linking up with Billy Barr and his Blackburn Rovers U23s squad. Three weeks later, on 17 November, Dack returned to the pitch for the first time, playing 45-minutes in Blackburn's 2–2 friendly draw with Sheffield United. On 23 December, Blackburn announced that Dack had signed a new two-and-a-half-year deal that would run until the summer of 2023, with the club having the option to take up an additional year. Following the news, Dack made his official return for Blackburn days later on 26 December, coming on as a substitute for Lewis Holtby in the 62nd minute of the 1–1 draw with Sheffield Wednesday.

On 12 March 2021, in Blackburn's Championship game against promotion-chasing Brentford, Dack went down injured in stoppage time after a clash with Brentford goalkeeper David Raya, with the club suspecting a further cruciate knee ligament injury - this time being occurring in Dack's left knee. Days later, Blackburn confirmed that Dack had suffered the same fate of his previous injury, with Dack undergoing surgery on his left knee to repair the damage. He returned to training five months later on 27 August, with Dack returning to action for Blackburn's U23s side in January 2022, playing 45 minutes of a 4–0 win over Leeds United.

Dack made his return to competitive football on 12 March 2022, a year to the day since his last game for Blackburn. Coming on as a 70th-minute substitute against fellow Championship side Bristol City, Dack was called upon to take the penalty awarded to Rovers after Jan Paul van Hecke was brought down by City's youngster Han-Noah Massengo. The penalty was saved, however, by Dan Bentley. Days later, on 15 March, Dack played a full 45 minutes for Blackburn after coming on as a half-time substitute in replacement of Bradley Johnson. Rovers were down 1–0 to 23rd placed Derby County at the half-time whistle, forcing changes to be made in an attempt to rescue much needed points. Dack helped turn the fortunes of his side around, being involved in the build-up of all three of the club's goals, whilst directly assisting Tyrhys Dolan's 59th-minute header. Dack managed seven further appearances for Blackburn in the remainder of the 2021–22 season.

The 2022–23 season saw Dack make 33 appearances and score 7 goals. However, this included just 12 league starts.

On 17 May 2023, Blackburn confirmed that Dack would be leaving the club after six years. The following day, Dack posted a farewell message to supporters on Instagram, revealing that he would have liked to have remained at the club. In an interview with LancsLive reporter Elliott Jackson, Blackburn's director of football Gregg Broughton stated that a combination of finances and inability to assure greater playing time resulted in the club's decision to let Dack depart.

=== Sunderland ===
On 27 July 2023, following his release from Blackburn Rovers, Dack reunited with former manager Mowbray and joined Sunderland on an initial one-year contract, with the club having the option of a one-year extension. He was released at the end of the 2023–24 season.

=== Return to Gillingham ===
On 15 August 2024, Dack returned to League Two club Gillingham.

On 30 May 2025, the club announced he had signed a new one-year contract. On 9 April 2026, he signed another one-year extension. Dack won Gillingham's Player of the Year award for a second time for the 2025–26 season after finishing the season as the team's top scorer. On 3 October 2026, Dack made his 250th appearance for The Gills in a league match against Newport County.

== Style of play ==
An attacking midfielder, Dack has described himself as adopting a "free role behind the two strikers in the final third to go and pick up the ball, get into good positions and create and score goals".

Dack's manager at Gillingham between 2015 and 2017, Justin Edinburgh, described him as "the catalyst of [our] team...full of energy, he is tenacious, he has quality and he is a top player – definitely Championship quality", adding that he "probably covers more ground than any other player".

Interviewed by Sky Sports in February 2016, Dack suggested that the model for his own style of play was former Chelsea and England international Frank Lampard. He also revealed that before committing to football he had undertaken trials to play cricket for Kent.

== Personal life ==
In 2019, Dack became engaged to former Love Island contestant Olivia Attwood. The couple had to delay their wedding for a second time in 2022 following Dack's second cruciate knee ligament injury. They were reported to have married on 3 June 2023. The couple separated in January 2026, revealing that they were never legally married, as the hotel where the ceremony took place did not have a license to carry out weddings and an appointment to complete the required paperwork at a registry office was cancelled.

Dack was a childhood Manchester United fan.

== Career statistics ==
As of match played 14 October 2026

Appearances and goals by club, season and competition
Club	Season	League			FA Cup		League Cup		Other		Total	
Club	Season	Division	Apps	Goals	Apps	Goals	Apps	Goals	Apps	Goals	Apps	Goals
Gillingham	2012–13	League Two	16	1	1	0	2	0	1 (Note: Appearances in Football league Trophy)	1	20	2
Gillingham	2013–14	League One	28	3	2	1	1	0	1	1	32	5
Gillingham	2014–15	League One	42	9	0	0	2	0	6	1	50	10
Gillingham	2015–16	League One	40	13	0	0	2	1	2	1	44	15
Gillingham	2016–17	League One	34	5	1	0	3	1	1 (Note: Appearance in the EFL Trophy)	0	39	6
Gillingham	Total		160	31	4	1	10	2	11	4	185	38
Ramsgate (loan)	2011–12	Isthmian League	5	2	—						5	2
Braintree Town (loan)	2012–13	Conference Premier	4	1	—						4	1
Blackburn Rovers	2017–18	League One	42	18	3	0	0	0	0	0	45	18
Blackburn Rovers	2018–19	Championship	42	15	2	1	1	2	0	0	45	18
Blackburn Rovers	2019–20	Championship	22	9	0	0	2	1	0	0	24	10
Blackburn Rovers	2020–21	Championship	16	3	1	0	0	0	0	0	17	3
Blackburn Rovers	2021–22	Championship	9	1	0	0	0	0	0	0	9	1
Blackburn Rovers	2022–23	Championship	27	4	3	1	3	2	0	0	33	7
Blackburn Rovers	Total		158	50	9	2	6	5	0	0	173	57
Sunderland	2023–24	Championship	16	1	0	0	1	0	0	0	17	1
Gillingham	2024–25	League Two	19	1	0	0	0	0	1	0	20	1
Gillingham	2025-26	League Two	41	7	1	0	0	0	0	0	42	7
Gillingham	2026–27	League Two	3	0	0	0	0	0	2	1	5	1
Career total			401	91	14	3	17	7	14	5	446	106

== Honours ==
Gillingham

- Football League Two: 2012–13

Blackburn Rovers

- EFL League One runner-up: 2017–18

Individual

- The Football League/EFL Team of the Season: 2015–16, 2017–18
- EFL League One Player of the Year: 2015–16, 2017–18
- PFA Fans' Player of the Year: 2017–18 League One
- PFA Team of the Year: 2015–16 League One, 2017–18 League One
- Gillingham Player of the Season: 2015–16, 2025–26
- Gillingham Young Player of the Season: 2012–13, 2014–15, 2015–16, 2016–17
- Blackburn Rovers Player of the Season: 2017–18
