= Robbie McKenzie =

English footballer

- McKenzie warming up in 2023 for Gillingham

Personal information
- Full name: Robbie McKenzie
- Date of birth: 25 September 1998 (age 28)
- Place of birth: Kingston upon Hull, England
- Height: 1.81 m (5 ft 11 in)
- Positions: Defender; midfielder

Team information
- Current team: Gillingham

Youth career
- 2007–2017: Hull City

Senior career*
Years	Team	Apps	(Gls)
2017–2020	Hull City	26	(0)
2020–2022	Gillingham	71	(4)
2022–	Gillingham	145	(12)
- * Club domestic league appearances and goals as of 11:00 14 October 2026 (UTC)

Robbie McKenzie (born 25 September 1998) is an English professional footballer who plays as a defender and midfielder for EFL League Two club Gillingham.

== Club career ==
=== Hull City ===
McKenzie joined Hull City at the age of nine and signed a scholarship in July 2016. On 22 August 2017, he made his debut in a 2–0 EFL Cup defeat to Doncaster Rovers. On 28 February 2018, McKenzie signed a two-year contract with the club.

Following the relegation of the club at the end of the 2019–20 season to League One, McKenzie was released by the club.

=== Gillingham ===
On 21 August 2020, McKenzie joined Gillingham on a free transfer following his release from Hull City. Following the Gills' relegation to League Two, McKenzie was offered a new contract at the end of the 2021–22 season which was initially rejected. However, having failed to find a new club, he re-signed for Gillingham on transfer deadline day. In May 2025, he signed a new two-year contract extension.

== Career statistics ==
As of 14 October 2026

Appearances and goals by club, season and competition
Club	Season	League			FA Cup		League Cup		Other		Total	
Club	Season	Division	Apps	Goals	Apps	Goals	Apps	Goals	Apps	Goals	Apps	Goals
Hull City	2017–18	Championship	0	0	0	0	1	0	—		1	0
Hull City	2018–19	Championship	18	0	1	0	2	0	—		21	0
Hull City	2019–20	Championship	8	0	2	0	2	0	—		12	0
Hull City	Total		26	0	3	0	5	0	—		34	0
Gillingham	2020–21	League One	33	1	2	0	3	0	3 (Note: Appearances in EFL Trophy)	0	41	1
Gillingham	2021–22	League One	38	3	1	0	1	0	3	1	43	4
Gillingham	2022–23	League Two	34	1	4	0	1	0	2	0	39	1
Gillingham	2023–24	League Two	21	1	1	0	2	2	1	0	25	3
Gillingham	2024–25	League Two	39	6	0	0	1	0	0	0	40	6
Gillingham	2025–26	League Two	37	4	1	0	1	0	0	0	39	4
Gillingham	2026–27	League Two	10	0	0	0	1	0	0	0	11	0
Total			212	16	9	0	10	2	9	1	240	19
Career total			238	16	12	0	15	2	9	1	274	19
