= Ethan Coleman =

English footballer

- Coleman in 2023

Personal information
- Full name: Ethan Jay Coleman
- Date of birth: 28 January 2000 (age 26)
- Place of birth: Reading, England
- Height: 1.88 m (6 ft 2 in)
- Position: Midfielder

Team information
- Current team: Gillingham
- Number: 6

Youth career
- –2020: Reading

Senior career*
| Years | Team | Apps | (Gls) |
| 2020–2021 | Brackley Town | 16 | (1) |
| 2021 | → King's Lynn Town (loan) | 9 | (0) |
| 2021–2022 | King's Lynn Town | 20 | (2) |
| 2022–2023 | Leyton Orient | 15 | (1) |
| 2022–2023 | → Bromley (loan) | 23 | (0) |
| 2023– | Gillingham | 113 | (0) |
- * Club domestic league appearances and goals as of 21:22, 14 November 2026 (UTC)

Ethan Jay Coleman (born 28 January 2000) is an English professional footballer who plays as a midfielder for EFL League Two club Gillingham.

== Career ==
Coleman began his career with the academy of Reading, before joining Brackley Town in 2020. He moved on loan to King's Lynn Town in March 2021, before the move was made permanent in May 2021. At King's Lynn he was a "mainstay" of the squad.

He moved to Leyton Orient in January 2022 for an undisclosed fee, signing a two-and-a-half-year contract.

On 4 August 2022, Coleman signed for National League club Bromley on a season-long loan deal.

On 19 January 2023, Coleman was recalled from his loan at Bromley and signed permanently for Gillingham for an undisclosed fee.

== Career statistics ==
As of match played 14 November 2026

Appearances and goals by club, season and competition
| Club | Season | League | | | FA Cup | | EFL Cup | | Other | | Total | |
| Club | Season | Division | Apps | Goals | Apps | Goals | Apps | Goals | Apps | Goals | Apps | Goals |
|---|---|---|---|---|---|---|---|---|---|---|---|---|
| Brackley Town | 2020–21 | National League North | 16 | 1 | 2 | 0 | 0 | 0 | 0 | 0 | 18 | 1 |
| King's Lynn Town (loan) | 2020–21 | National League | 9 | 0 | 0 | 0 | 0 | 0 | 0 | 0 | 9 | 0 |
| King's Lynn Town | 2021–22 | National League | 20 | 2 | 1 | 0 | 0 | 0 | 1 | 0 | 22 | 2 |
| Leyton Orient | 2021–22 | League Two | 15 | 1 | 0 | 0 | 0 | 0 | 0 | 0 | 15 | 1 |
| Leyton Orient | 2022–23 | League Two | 0 | 0 | 0 | 0 | 0 | 0 | 0 | 0 | 0 | 0 |
| Leyton Orient | Total | | 15 | 1 | 0 | 0 | 0 | 0 | 0 | 0 | 15 | 1 |
| Bromley (loan) | 2022–23 | National League | 23 | 0 | 1 | 0 | — | | 1 (Note: Appearance(s) in FA Trophy) | 0 | 25 | 0 |
| Gillingham | 2022–23 | League Two | 11 | 0 | 0 | 0 | 0 | 0 | 0 | 0 | 11 | 0 |
| Gillingham | 2024–24 | League Two | 43 | 0 | 3 | 0 | 1 | 0 | 2 (Note: Appearance(s) in the EFL Trophy.) | 0 | 49 | 0 |
| Gillingham | 2024–25 | League Two | 21 | 0 | 0 | 0 | 0 | 0 | 2 | 0 | 23 | 0 |
| Gillingham | 2025–26 | League Two | 32 | 0 | 1 | 0 | 1 | 1 | 0 | 0 | 34 | 1 |
| Gillingham | 2026–27 | League Two | 6 | 0 | 1 | 0 | 0 | 0 | 3 | 1 | 10 | 1 |
| Gillingham | Total | | 113 | 0 | 5 | 0 | 2 | 1 | 7 | 1 | 127 | 2 |
| Career total | | | 196 | 4 | 9 | 0 | 2 | 1 | 9 | 1 | 216 | 6 |
