= Omar Beckles =

Grenadian footballer

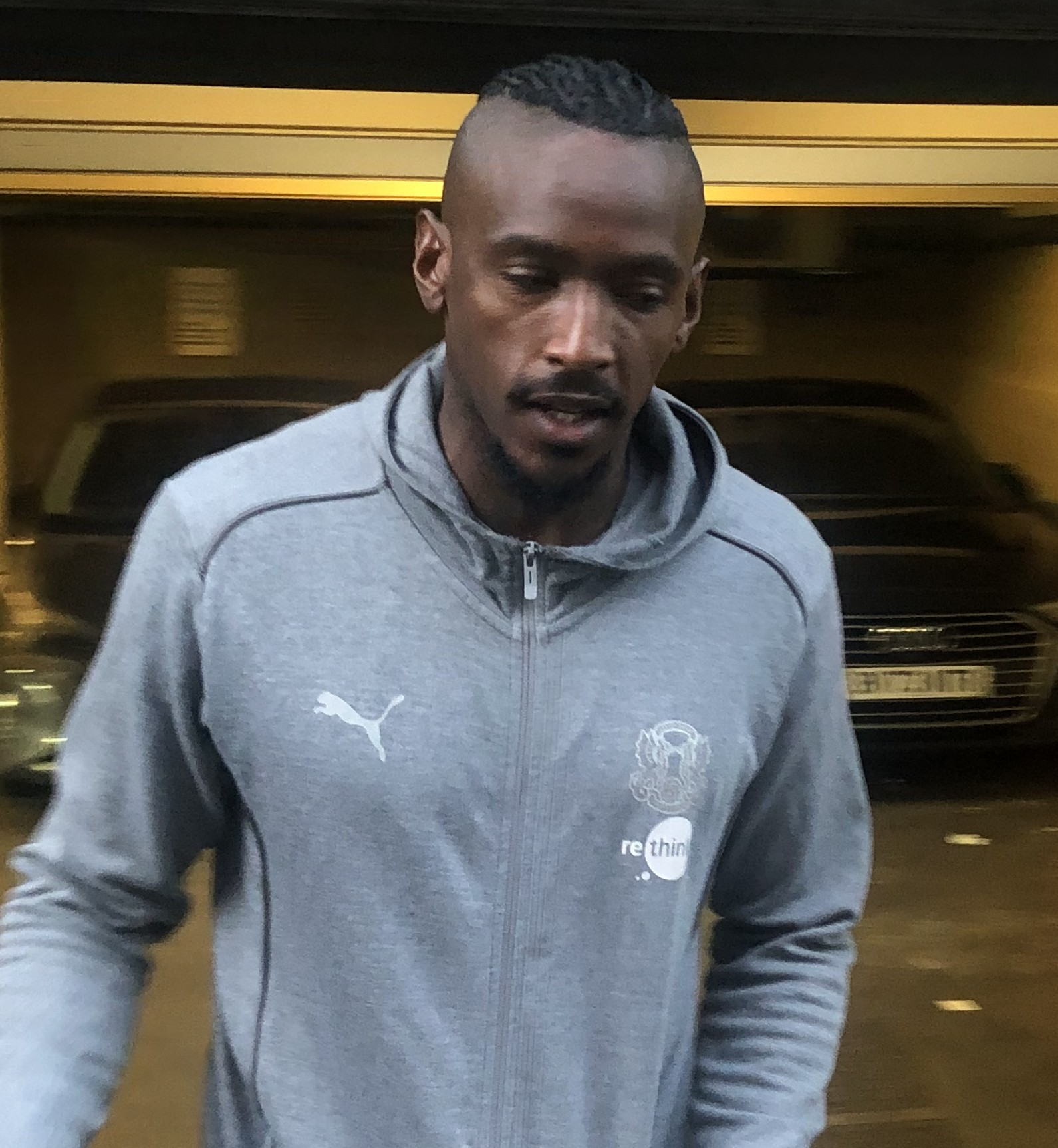
- Beckles in 2025

Personal information
- Full name: Omar Jerome Beckles
- Date of birth: 25 October 1991 (age 35)
- Place of birth: Leytonstone, England
- Height: 1.91 m (6 ft 3 in)
- Position: Defender

Team information
- Current team: Gillingham
- Number: 19

Youth career
- 2008–2010: Millwall

Senior career*
Years	Team	Apps	(Gls)
2010–2011	Jerez Industrial	13	(0)
2011–2012	Boreham Wood	19	(0)
2012	Kettering Town	6	(1)
2012–2013	Boreham Wood	6	(0)
2013	Billericay Town	13	(0)
2013–2014	Histon	30	(1)
2014	→ Margate (loan)	10	(0)
2014	AFC Hornchurch	7	(0)
2014–2015	St Albans City	21	(2)
2015–2016	Aldershot Town	45	(1)
2016–2017	Accrington Stanley	43	(3)
2017–2020	Shrewsbury Town	80	(6)
2020–2021	Crewe Alexandra	41	(1)
2021–2026	Leyton Orient	174	(13)
2026–	Gillingham	14	(1)

International career^{‡}
2019–2024	Grenada	8	(0)
- * Club domestic league appearances and goals as of 08:06, 7 September 2026 (UTC) ‡ National team caps and goals as of 16 February 2025 (UTC)

Omar Jerome Beckles (born 25 October 1991) is a professional footballer who plays as a defender for EFL League Two club Gillingham. Born in England, he represents the Grenada national team. He is the chair of the Professional Footballers' Association.

== Club career ==
=== Spain ===
Born in Leytonstone, England, Beckles began his career at Millwall before joining Jerez Industrial in 2010. Beckles made his Jerez Industrial debut on 6 February 2011 against Córdoba CF B, which saw Jerez Industrial lose 3–1. He went on to make thirteen appearances for Jerez Industrial. However, Glenn Hoddle Academy terminated its agreement with Jerez Industrial in March 2011, leading Beckles to leave the club, although he continued to play for the side for the remainder of the season.

=== Non-League football ===
After returning to his homeland, Beckles joined Boreham Wood in November 2011, where he first appeared as unused substitute, in a 1–1 draw against Basingstoke Town on 24 November 2011. It was not until on 17 December 2011 when he made his debut, coming on as a second-half substitute for Charlie O'Loughlin, in a 2–1 win over Eastleigh. Beckles soon became a first team regular at Boreham Wood and went on to make nineteen appearances for the side.

In the summer transfer window of 2012, Beckles joined Kettering Town after leaving Boreham Wood. However, after making just six appearances for The Poppies, Beckles was forced to find a new club, citing the club's financial problems as the reason for his departure.

After leaving Kettering Town, Beckles re–joined Boreham Wood on 16 November 2012 and re–debuted for the club the next day, in a 1–1 draw against Dover Athletic. However, Beckles went on to make six appearances before leaving for Billericay Town in February 2013. He made his Billericay Town debut on 23 February 2013, in a 3–2 loss against Bromley. He went on to make thirteen appearances for the club.

On 5 July 2013, Beckles joined Histon. Beckles made a good start to his Histon debut when he scored on 17 August 2013, in a 3–1 win over Colwyn Bay. Beckles soon became a first team regular at Histon, making thirty-two appearances and scoring once in all competitions, but joined Margate and AFC Hornchurch.

In November 2014, Beckles was on the move again when he joined St Albans City and made his St Albans City debut on 15 November 2014, making his first start and playing the whole game, in a 1–0 win over Basingstoke Town. Playing in a central defensive midfielder role, it wasn't until on 4 January 2015 when he scored his first goal for the club, in a 2–1 win over Gosport Borough. Beckles scored his second goal for the side on 21 February 2015, in a 2–1 loss against Whitehawk. At the end of the 2014–15 season, he went on to make twenty-one appearances and scoring once. For his performance, Beckles agreed a new contract with the club to play for them next season.

=== Aldershot Town ===
In July 2015, Beckles signed for Aldershot Town, signing a one-year contract. Upon joining the club, he was given a number fourteen shirt.

Beckles made his Aldershot Town debut, in the opening game of the season, where he played the whole game, in a 2–1 loss against Gateshead. From that moment on, Beckles became a first team regular at the club, forming a centre-back partnership with Jack Saville for most of the season. After making his debut, Beckles cemented his place in the side, which resulted in him making the Team of the Week. after a great performance against Kidderminster Harriers on 30 January 2016. It wasn't until on 28 March 2016, though, when Beckles scored his first goal of the club in a 2–1 win over Braintree Town. At the end of the 2015–16 season, Beckles made 48 appearances (45 of which were in the league) and scored once in all competitions.

Beckles was awarded the Supporters Player of the Year. In addition, Beckles was also offered a new contract by the club. However, on 9 June 2016, Beckles left the club after not responding to a new contract by Aldershot Town.

=== Accrington Stanley ===
In June 2016, he signed for League Two side Accrington Stanley, signing a one-year contract. Upon joining the club, Beckles was given a number five shirt.

Beckles made his debut against Doncaster Rovers on the opening day of the season, which saw Accrington Stanley win 3–2. He then made provided two assists in two matches on 24 September 2016 and 27 September 2016 against Colchester United and Mansfield Town. In the club's second meeting against Mansfield Town of the season on 14 February 2017, he scored his first goal for the club, in a 4–4 draw. However, in the next match against Colchester United on 18 February 2017, Beckles received a straight red card in a 2–1 win. Following the match, Beckles served a three match suspension, after manager John Coleman decided against appealing, citing "a waste of time". After returning from suspension, Beckles scored again on 18 March 2017, in a 1–1 draw against Yeovil Town. However, in a 4–1 loss against Luton Town on 29 April 2017, Beckles scored an own goal following "a comedy of errors to give Luton a second when Beckles headed back to Rodak and it looped over the keeper and into the net four minutes into the second half." In total, Beckles made 50 appearances in all competitions, and scored three times - all in his first season at Accrington.

=== Shrewsbury Town ===
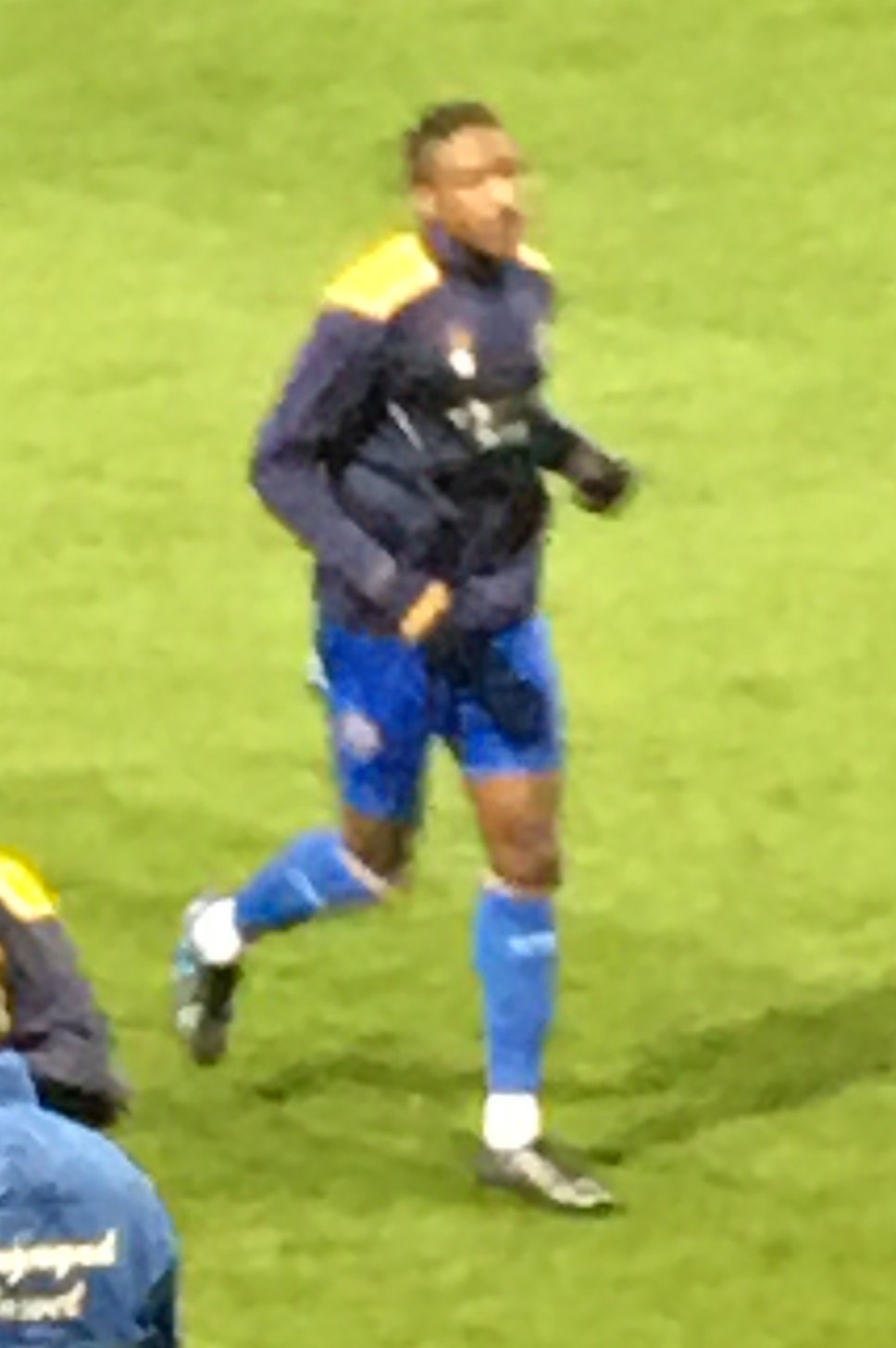
Beckles with Shrewsbury Town in 2019.

Beckles joined League One side Shrewsbury Town for an undisclosed fee in August 2017, signing a three-year deal. Initially used mostly as a substitute or rotation player, he broke into the first-team on a regular basis playing as a left-back following a long-term injury to Junior Brown, and scored his first goal for the club in a 2−1 away victory at Bristol Rovers on 3 February 2018.

He finished the season in the League One team of the year.

After making 80 league appearances and scoring six league goals, Beckles left the club on 13 August 2020 after deciding to not renew his contract.

=== Crewe Alexandra ===
On 4 September 2020, Crewe Alexandra announced Beckles had agreed a one-year deal with a 12-month option. He made his Crewe debut in a 3–2 victory at Bolton Wanderers in an EFL Trophy group game on 8 September 2020. On 3 October 2020, Beckles caused Crewe's League One game at Oxford United to be postponed after he reported a positive diagnosis of COVID-19 disease on the morning of the match. He scored his first goal for Crewe, opening the scoring in a 2–0 win over former club Accrington Stanley, at Gresty Road on 23 February 2021. On 13 May 2021, Crewe announced that it had offered Beckles a new contract.

=== Leyton Orient ===
On 15 June 2021, Beckles was announced to have agreed to join hometown club Leyton Orient, agreeing to sign a two-year deal.

On 2 February 2026, having made 200 appearances for the O's, Beckles departed the club.

=== Gillingham ===
On 2 February 2026, he joined League Two club Gillingham.

== International career ==
In August 2019, Beckles was called up for the first time to play for Grenada, alongside his Shrewsbury teammate Aaron Pierre. He made his debut for The Spice Boys on 5 September, a 2–1 win over Saint Kitts and Nevis.

== Personal life ==
Beckles was born in Leytonstone, London. He is of Grenadian descent.

He is a devout Christian.

His father, Linton, was in a R&B and soul band named Central Line. Linton died from complications of pneumonia at age 59. Beckles stated his father's death had a huge effect on him and his family and was a huge influence on his life.

Growing up in Walthamstow, Beckles grew up supporting Arsenal.

== Career statistics ==
As of 8 September 2026

Appearances and goals by club, season and competition
Club	Season	League			FA Cup		League Cup		Other		Total	
Club	Season	Division	Apps	Goals	Apps	Goals	Apps	Goals	Apps	Goals	Apps	Goals
Jerez Industrial	2010–11	Tercera División	13	0	—		—		—		13	0
Boreham Wood	2011–12	Conference South	19	0	—		—		0	0	19	0
Kettering Town	2012–13	SL Premier Division	6	1	—		—		—		6	1
Boreham Wood	2012–13	Conference South	6	0	—		—		—		6	0
Billericay Town	2012–13	Conference South	13	0	—		—		—		13	0
Histon	2013–14	Conference North	30	1	2	0	—		1 (Note: Appearances in FA Trophy)	0	33	1
St Albans City	2014–15	Conference South	21	2	—		—		0	0	21	2
Aldershot Town	2015–16	National League	45	1	3	0	—		1	0	49	1
Accrington Stanley	2016–17	League Two	41	2	4	1	3	0	0	0	48	3
Accrington Stanley	2017–18	League Two	2	1	–		0	0	–		2	1
Accrington Stanley	Total		43	3	4	1	3	0	0	0	50	4
Shrewsbury Town	2017–18	League One	33	3	4	0	–		10 (Note: Seven appearances in EFL Trophy, three appearances in EFL League One play-offs)	0	47	3
Shrewsbury Town	2018–19	League One	36	1	7	0	1	0	3 (Note: Appearances in EFL Trophy)	1	47	2
Shrewsbury Town	2019–20	League One	11	2	0	0	1	0	0	0	12	2
Shrewsbury Town	Total		80	6	11	0	2	0	13	1	106	7
Crewe Alexandra	2020–21	League One	41	1	1	0	–		1	0	43	1
Leyton Orient	2021–22	League Two	44	5	3	1	1	0	1	0	49	6
Leyton Orient	2022–23	League Two	41	3	1	0	1	0	1	0	44	3
Leyton Orient	2023–24	League One	35	2	0	0	1	0	2	0	38	2
Leyton Orient	2024–25	League One	32	3	3	0	3	0	5 (Note: Two appearances in EFL Trophy, three appearances in EFL League One play-offs)	0	43	3
Leyton Orient	2025–26	League One	22	0	2	0	0	0	2	0	26	0
Leyton Orient	Total		174	13	9	1	6	0	11	0	200	14
Gillingham	2025–26	League Two	9	0	—		—		—		9	0
Gillingham	2026–27	League Two	5	1	0	0	1	0	0	0	6	1
Gillingham	Total		14	1	0	0	1	0	0	0	15	1
Career total			505	29	30	2	12	0	27	1	563	32

== Honours ==
Shrewsbury Town

- EFL Trophy runner-up: 2017–18

Leyton Orient

- EFL League Two: 2022–23

Individual

- EFL League One Team of the Season: 2017–18
- EFL League Two Team of the Season: 2022–23
- PFA Team of the Year: 2022–23 League Two
