= Max Clark (footballer) =

English footballer (born 1996)

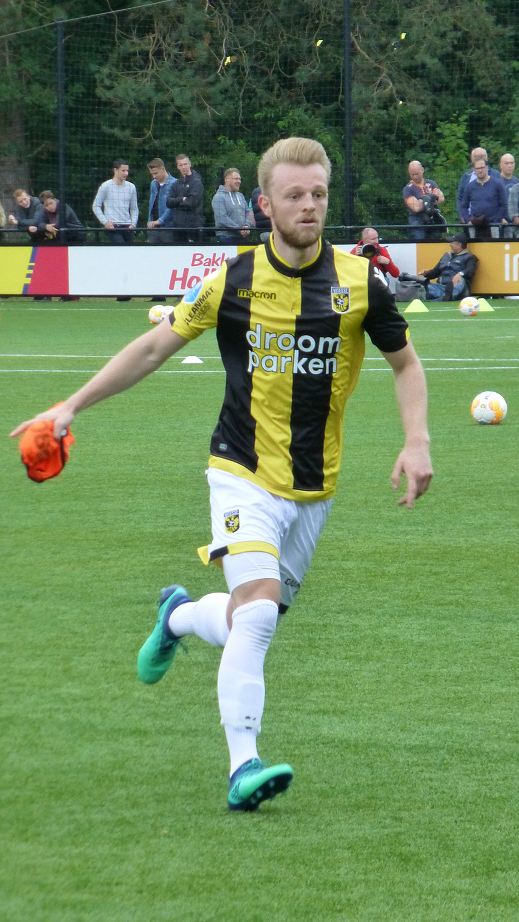
- Clark training with Vitesse in 2018

Personal information
- Full name: Max Oliver Clark
- Date of birth: 19 January 1996 (age 30)
- Place of birth: Kingston upon Hull, England
- Height: 5 ft 11 in (1.80 m)
- Positions: Defender; midfielder

Team information
- Current team: Hartlepool United

Youth career
- –2006: Barham Boys Club
- 2006–2014: Hull City

Senior career*
Years	Team	Apps	(Gls)
2014–2018	Hull City	27	(0)
2016	→ Cambridge United (loan)	9	(0)
2016–2017	→ Cambridge United (loan)	27	(1)
2018–2021	Vitesse	46	(2)
2021	Hull City	0	(0)
2021–2022	Fleetwood Town	10	(0)
2022	Rochdale	23	(1)
2022–2023	Stevenage	38	(1)
2023–2026	Gillingham	103	(7)
2026–	Hartlepool United	6	(0)

International career
2010–2012	England U16	12	(0)
2012	England U17	3	(0)
- * Club domestic league appearances and goals as of 23:20, 21 November 2026 (UTC)

Max Oliver Clark (born 19 January 1996) is an English professional footballer who plays as a defender or a midfielder for National League club Hartlepool United. He has represented England at under-16 and under-17 levels.

== Club career ==
=== Hull City ===
Born in Kingston upon Hull, East Riding of Yorkshire, Clark started out at Barham Boys Club before joining the youth system of Hull City in 2006, where he began his youth career. After progressing through the academy, Clark signed his first professional contract with the club and was promoted to the development squad. After a season with the development squad, Clark signed a one-year contract extension with the club, which was later extended once more.

Ahead of the 2017–18 season, Clark was featured in the first team's pre-season after being called up by new manager Leonid Slutsky. He made his league debut for Hull City on the opening day of the 2017–18 season, 5 August 2017, away at Aston Villa, in a 1–1 draw. After making his debut, Clark found himself competing with new signing Stephen Kingsley for the left-back position over the following months. As a result of his performance, the club began a negotiation deal over a new contract for Clark. After being a substitute at the beginning of 2018, he regained his first-team place by February. Over the next two months Clark continued to feature, before losing his place to Kingsley for the remainder of the season. The 2017–18 season proved to be Clark's breakthrough season as he made 30 appearances in all competitions.

However, his future at Hull City remained in doubt as contract talks continued for eight months with Clark reportedly turning down a contract. On 18 May 2018, Clark was among four players to be offered a new contract by the club.

==== Loan spell at Cambridge United ====
On 25 March 2016, Clark signed for League Two club Cambridge United on loan until the end of the 2015–16 season. He made his debut later that day as a 55th-minute substitute for Luke Berry in a 3–0 away defeat to Bristol Rovers. In a follow-up match against Oxford United on 28 March 2016, he started and played 75 minutes before coming off as a substitute in a 0–0 draw. Clark finished his loan spell with nine appearances before returning to his parent club at the end of the season.

On 30 June 2016, Clark re-signed for Cambridge United on a six-month loan. His first appearance after rejoining the club came on the opening day of 2016–17 season in a 1–1 draw at home to Barnet. Since joining the club for the second time, he continued to regain his first team place throughout the season. Clark then set up two goals during a match against Cheltenham Town on 26 November 2016 in a 3–1 win. On 10 December 2016, he scored his first goal for the club, in a 5–0 win over Hartlepool United. On 1 January 2017, Clark's loan at Cambridge was extended until the end of the season. After being featured in the first team for the next two months, he was sent off for a straight red card for a late tackle on Nicky Deverdics in a 1–0 loss against Hartlepool United on 14 March 2017. Although he was suspended, Clark never played for the side for the rest of the season. He completed the loan spell with 35 appearances and one goal in all competitions before returning to his parent club.

=== Vitesse ===
Clark signed for Eredivisie club Vitesse on 22 June 2018 on a three-year contract after rejecting a new contract with Hull. Hull received compensation from Vitesse, reported by the Hull Daily Mail as "in the region of £400,000". On 9 August 2018, Clark made his Vitesse debut as well as his European debut during their 1–0 defeat to Basel in the UEFA Europa League third qualifying round, replacing Alexander Büttner with three minutes remaining.

=== Hull City ===
Clark returned to Hull City on 1 February 2021 on a short four month deal. On 18 May 2021, the club announced that Clark would leave the club at the end of the 2020–21 season.

=== Fleetwood Town ===
On 17 June 2021, Clark agreed a one-year deal to join Fleetwood Town with the club holding the option for a second year.

On 20 January 2022, Clark left Fleetwood Town by mutual consent.

=== Rochdale ===
On 21 January 2022, Clark signed for Rochdale on a deal until the end of the season.

=== Stevenage ===
On 16 June 2022, Clark agreed a deal to join Stevenage upon the expiration of his contract with Rochdale, having opted against extending his short-term contract.

=== Gillingham ===
In July 2023, Clark joined Gillingham. On 5 June 2025, the club announced the player had signed a new one-year contract.

He was released by Gillingham at the end of the 2025–26 season.

=== Hartlepool United ===
On 9 October 2026, Clark signed for National League club Hartlepool United on a deal until January 2027.

== International career ==
While at the academy, Clark was first called up to the England under-16 team on 15 October 2010 against Wales. He made 12 appearances for England U16s.

In August 2012, Clark was called up by the England under-17 team for the first time. He played in three matches for England U17s against Italy, Turkey and Portugal.

Clark was also called up by the England under-18 team for the first time in November 2013.

== Personal life ==
Growing up, Clark attended Ings Road Primary School and Malet Lambert High School.

== Career statistics ==
As of 21 November 2026

Appearances and goals by club, season and competition
Club	Season	League			National Cup		League Cup		Other		Total	
Club	Season	Division	Apps	Goals	Apps	Goals	Apps	Goals	Apps	Goals	Apps	Goals
Hull City	2014–15	Premier League	0	0	0	0	0	0	0	0	0	0
Hull City	2015–16	Championship	0	0	0	0	0	0	0	0	0	0
Hull City	2016–17	Premier League	0	0	—		—		—		0	0
Hull City	2017–18	Championship	27	0	3	0	0	0	—		30	0
Hull City	Total		27	0	3	0	0	0	0	0	30	0
Cambridge United (loan)	2015–16	League Two	9	0	—		—		—		9	0
Cambridge United (loan)	2016–17	League Two	27	1	3	0	1	0	4 (Note: Appearance(s) in EFL Trophy)	0	35	1
Cambridge United (loan)	Total		36	1	3	0	1	0	4	0	44	1
Vitesse	2018–19	Eredivisie	23	1	3	0	—		4 (Note: One appearance in UEFA Europa League, three appearances and one goal in Eredivisie European play-offs)	1	30	2
Vitesse	2019–20	Eredivisie	23	1	4	0	—		—		27	1
Vitesse	2020–21	Eredivisie	0	0	0	0	—		—		0	0
Vitesse	Total		46	2	7	0	—		4	1	57	3
Hull City	2020–21	League One	0	0	—		—		0	0	0	0
Fleetwood Town	2021–22	League One	10	0	0	0	1	0	4	0	15	0
Rochdale	2021–22	League Two	23	1	0	0	0	0	0	0	23	1
Stevenage	2022–23	League Two	38	1	3	0	2	0	4	0	47	1
Gillingham	2023–24	League Two	22	1	1	0	2	0	3	0	28	1
Gillingham	2024–25	League Two	40	3	0	0	1	0	2	0	43	3
Gillingham	2025–26	League Two	41	3	1	0	1	0	3	0	46	3
Gillingham	Total		103	7	2	0	4	0	8	0	117	7
Hartlepool United	2026–27	National League	6	0	1	0	–		1	0	8	0
Career total			289	12	19	0	8	0	25	1	341	13
