= Travis Akomeah =

English footballer

Personal information
- Date of birth: 6 January 2006 (age 20)
- Position: Defender

Team information
- Current team: Watford

Youth career
- Watford
- 2022–2025: Chelsea
- 2025: Watford

Senior career*
Years	Team	Apps	(Gls)
2025–	Watford	0	(0)
2025–2026	→ Gillingham (loan)	4	(0)
2026	→ Gillingham (loan)	9	(0)
- * Club domestic league appearances and goals as of 16:35, 25 April 2026 (UTC)

Travis Akomeah (born 6 January 2006) is an English professional footballer who plays as a defender for Watford.

== Career ==
Akomeah spent his early career with Watford and Chelsea, returning to Watford in February 2025. He signed on loan for Gillingham in September 2025. Upon signing he was praised by Gillingham manager Gareth Ainsworth, and made his Football League debut on 22 November, appearing as a late substitute, in his fifth game for the club. His loan ended in January 2026 but later that month he returned on loan to Gillingham.
