= Ollie Wright (footballer, born 2002) =

English footballer (born 2002)

Personal information
- Full name: Oliver Lennon George Wright
- Date of birth: 25 October 2002 (age 24)
- Place of birth: Bath, England
- Height: 1.94 m (6 ft 4 in)
- Position: Goalkeeper

Team information
- Current team: Gillingham (on loan from Southampton)
- Number: 1

Youth career
- 2012–2023: Southampton

Senior career*
Years	Team	Apps	(Gls)
2023–	Southampton	0	(0)
2023	→ Bath City (loan)	12	(0)
2024	→ Worthing (loan)	10	(0)
2024–2025	→ Yeovil Town (loan)	29	(0)
2025	→ Solihull Moors (loan)	10	(0)
2025–2026	→ Accrington Stanley (loan)	43	(0)
2026–	→ Gillingham (loan)	14	(0)
- * Club domestic league appearances and goals as of 06:23, 22 November 2026 (UTC)

Oliver Lennon George Wright (born 25 October 2002) is an English professional footballer who plays as a goalkeeper for EFL League Two club Gillingham, on loan from EFL Championship club Southampton.

== Career ==
Born in Bath, Wright began his career at Southampton in May 2012, and signed a new contract in June 2023, joining Bath City on loan later that month. He then spent time on loan at Worthing, joining them in February 2024, with whom he lost the National League South play-off final.

In April 2024 he signed a new two-year contract with Southampton, before moving on loan to Yeovil Town in June 2024, saying he was looking forward to the step-up to the National League.

He was recalled by Southampton in February 2025, and later that month he moved on loan to Solihull Moors.

In July 2025 he signed on loan for Accrington Stanley. Following the conclusion of the 2025–26 season, Southampton activated a one-year contract extension.

On 3 July 2026, Wright signed a three-year contract extension with Southampton and joined Gillingham on a season-long loan.

== Career statistics ==
As of match played 21 November 2026

Appearances and goals by club, season and competition
Club	Season	League			FA Cup		EFL Cup		Other		Total	
Club	Season	Division	Apps	Goals	Apps	Goals	Apps	Goals	Apps	Goals	Apps	Goals
Southampton U21	2022–23	—			—		—		2 (Note: Appearance(s) in EFL Trophy)	0	2	0
Southampton	2023–24	Championship	0	0	0	0	0	0	0	0	0	0
Southampton	2024–25	Premier League	0	0	0	0	0	0	—		0	0
Southampton	2025–26	Championship	0	0	0	0	0	0	—		0	0
Southampton	2026–27	Championship	0	0	0	0	0	0	—		0	0
Southampton	Total		0	0	0	0	0	0	0	0	0	0
Bath City (loan)	2023–24	National League South	12	0	3	0	—		0	0	15	0
Worthing (loan)	2023–24	National League South	10	0	—		—		2 (Note: Appearances in National League South play-offs)	0	12	0
Yeovil Town (loan)	2024–25	National League	29	0	1	0	—		1 (Note: Appearance in FA Trophy)	0	31	0
Solihull Moors (loan)	2024–25	National League	10	0	—		—		0	0	10	0
Accrington Stanley (loan)	2025–26	League Two	43	0	2	0	2	0	0	0	47	0
Gillingham (loan)	2026–27	League Two	14	0	1	0	0	0	1	0	16	0
Career total			118	0	7	0	2	0	6	0	133	0
