= Marcus Wyllie =

English footballer (born 1999)

Personal information
- Full name: Marcus Antony Wyllie
- Date of birth: 16 July 1999 (age 27)
- Place of birth: Cyprus
- Position: Forward

Team information
- Current team: Bedford Town (on loan from Aldershot Town)

Youth career
- 2011–2016: APOEL

Senior career*
Years	Team	Apps	(Gls)
2016–2017	Chesham United Reserves	13	(5)
2017–2018	Risborough Rangers	57	(25)
2018–2019	Berkhamsted	2	(0)
2019–2022	Risborough Rangers	54	(40)
2022–2024	Enfield Town	73	(32)
2024–2026	Gillingham	19	(1)
2025	→ Dagenham & Redbridge (loan)	10	(0)
2026	→ Ebbsfleet United (loan)	7	(1)
2026–	Aldershot Town	13	(1)
2026–	→ Bedford Town (loan)	0	(0)
- * Club domestic league appearances and goals as of 14:34, 13 November 2026 (UTC)

Marcus Antony Wyllie (born 16 July 1999) is an English professional footballer who plays as a forward for Bedford Town, on loan from National League club Aldershot Town.

== Career ==
=== Early career ===
Born in Cyprus, Wyllie began his career in Cyprus with APOEL, moving to England at the age of 17.

Upon returning to England, Wyllie played non-league football with Chesham United Reserves, Risborough Rangers, Berkhamsted and Enfield Town.

=== Gillingham ===
Wyllie signed for Gillingham for an undisclosed fee in July 2024, his first full-time professional contract. Prior to turning professional with Gillingham, he worked in a Special Education school. Gillingham manager Mark Bonner said he was looking forward to working with Wyllie.

Wyllie made his professional debut on 13 August 2024 as a 66th minute substitute in a 3–1 away defeat to Swansea City in the first round of the EFL Cup. He scored his first goal for the team in a 3–1 defeat to Crystal Palace under-21s in the EFL Trophy.

On 14 March 2025, Wyllie joined National League side Dagenham & Redbridge on loan for the remainder of the season. He made his debut for the side as a 69th minute substitute in a 1–3 league loss to Tamworth the following day. On 23 February 2026, Wyllie joined National League South side Ebbsfleet United on loan until the end of the season.

He was released by Gillingham at the end of the 2025–26 season.

=== Aldershot Town ===
On 19 May 2026, Wyllie agreed to join National League club Aldershot Town.

On 12 November 2026, Wyllie joined National League North club Bedford Town on loan until 2 January 2027.

== Career statistics ==
As of end of 2025–26 season

Appearances and goals by club, season and competition
Club	Season	League			FA Cup		EFL Cup		Other		Total	
Club	Season	Division	Apps	Goals	Apps	Goals	Apps	Goals	Apps	Goals	Apps	Goals
Enfield Town	2022–23	Isthmian League Premier Division	32	2	1	0	—		3 (Note: Two appearances and two goals in Alan Turvey Trophy, one appearance in Middlesex Senior Cup)	2	36	4
Enfield Town	2023–24	Isthmian League Premier Division	41	30	4	3	—		4 (Note: One appearance in FA Trophy, one in Alan Turvey Trophy, two appearances and one goal in Isthmian League Premier Division play-offs)	1	49	34
Enfield Town	Total		73	32	5	3	0	0	7	3	85	38
Gillingham	2024–25	League Two	12	0	1	0	1	0	2 (Note: Appearance(s) in EFL Trophy)	1	16	1
Gillingham	2025–26	League Two	7	1	0	0	1	0	3	1	11	2
Gillingham	Total		19	1	1	0	2	0	5	2	27	3
Dagenham & Redbridge (loan)	2024–25	National League	10	0	—		—		—		10	0
Ebbsfleet United (loan)	2025–26	National League South	7	1	—		—		0	0	7	1
Career total			109	34	6	3	2	0	12	5	129	42
