= Nelson Khumbeni =

Malawian footballer

Personal information
- Full name: Nelson Wilfred Khumbeni
- Date of birth: 14 October 2002 (age 24)
- Place of birth: Lilongwe, Malawi
- Position: Midfielder

Team information
- Current team: Eastleigh (on loan from Gillingham)

Youth career
- 2011–2021: Norwich City

Senior career*
Years	Team	Apps	(Gls)
2021–2022	Norwich City	0	(0)
2022–2025	Bolton Wanderers	0	(0)
2023	→ AFC Fylde (loan)	8	(0)
2024	→ Morecambe (loan)	18	(1)
2024–2025	→ Accrington Stanley (loan)	18	(1)
2025–	Gillingham	27	(0)
2026–	→ Eastleigh (loan)	0	(0)
- * Club domestic league appearances and goals as of 17:46, 7 August 2026 (UTC)

Nelson Wilfred Khumbeni (born 14 October 2002) is a Malawian footballer who plays as a midfielder for Eastleigh, on loan from EFL League Two club Gillingham.

== Career ==
Khumbeni came through the Norwich City Academy, joining at U9 level. He signed his first professional contract with Norwich City on 7 July 2021, penning a one-year deal. Upon the expiration of his deal, he joined Bolton Wanderers on 16 June 2022, linking up with the newly formed 'B' team.

Khumbeni made his Bolton debut on 9 August 2022 in a 5–1 victory against Salford City in the EFL Cup, coming on in the 83rd minute as a substitute for MJ Williams. On 25 May 2023, he signed a new two-year deal with the option of a further year after captaining the B Team for the season.

In October 2023, Khumbeni joined National League club AFC Fylde on a 28-day loan deal.

On 31 January 2024, Khumbeni joined EFL League Two club Morecambe on loan until the end of the season. On 22 May, Bolton confirmed that they had activated an option to extend his contract with the club. On 16 August 2024, Khumbemi joined another League Two club, Accrington Stanley, on loan.

=== Gillingham ===
In January 2025, Khumbeni joined Gillingham of League Two on a permanent contract for an undisclosed fee.

On 6 August 2026, Khumbeni joined National League club Eastleigh on a season-long loan.

== Personal life ==
Born in Malawi, Khumbeni moved to England at a young age.

== Career statistics ==
As of end of 2025–26 season

Appearances and goals by club, season and competition
Club	Season	League			FA Cup		League Cup		Other		Total	
Club	Season	Division	Apps	Goals	Apps	Goals	Apps	Goals	Apps	Goals	Apps	Goals
Norwich City U-23s	2019–20	—	—		—		—		1 (Note: Appearance(s) in EFL Trophy)	0	1	0
Norwich City U-23s	2020–21	—	—		—		—		2	0	2	0
Norwich City U-23s	Total		—		—		—		3	0	3	0
Bolton Wanderers	2022–23	League One	0	0	0	0	1	0	0	0	1	0
Bolton Wanderers	2023–24	League One	0	0	0	0	0	0	1	1	1	1
Bolton Wanderers	2024–25	League One	0	0	0	0	0	0	0	0	0	0
Bolton Wanderers	Total		0	0	0	0	1	0	1	1	2	1
AFC Fylde (loan)	2023–24	National League	8	0	1	0	—		—		9	0
Morecambe (loan)	2023–24	League Two	18	1	—		—		—		18	1
Accrington Stanley (loan)	2024–25	League Two	18	1	3	0	0	0	3	0	24	1
Gillingham	2024–25	League Two	10	0	—		—		0	0	10	0
Gillingham	2025–26	League Two	16	0	1	0	1	0	3	0	21	0
Gillingham	Total		26	0	1	0	1	0	3	0	31	0
Career total			70	2	5	0	2	0	10	1	87	3
