= Sam Gale =

English footballer (born 2004)

Personal information
- Full name: Sam Rodin Gale
- Date of birth: 1 October 2004 (age 22)
- Place of birth: Bromley, England
- Height: 1.89 m (6 ft 2 in)
- Position: Centre back

Team information
- Current team: Barnsley
- Number: 4

Youth career
- 2012–2016: Arsenal
- 2016–2023: Gillingham

Senior career*
Years	Team	Apps	(Gls)
2021–2026	Gillingham	64	(1)
2022	→ Sheppey United (loan)	24	(0)
2023–2024	→ Hastings United (loan)		
2024	→ Chelmsford City (loan)	14	(0)
2026–	Barnsley	9	(0)
- * Club domestic league appearances and goals as of 16:21, 24 October 2026 (UTC)

Sam Rodin Gale (born 1 October 2004) is an English professional footballer who plays as a centre back or defensive midfielder for EFL League One club Barnsley.

== Career ==
=== Gillingham ===
Gale started out at Arsenal as a junior, playing with the London side in their under-9s to under-12s, before being released and shortly afterwards joining Gillingham, where he progressed through the academy.

Gale made his first-team league debut for Gillingham on 23 November 2021, coming on as an 86th-minute substitute for Daniel Phillips in a 2–0 defeat to Cheltenham Town at Priestfield Stadium. On 16 September 2022, he joined Isthmian League South East Division club Sheppey United on loan; player-manager Jack Midson said that "he will come in and do a good job for us at holding midfielder and centre-back cover."

Gale signed his first professional contract with Gillingham in June 2023.

On 21 November 2023, Gale joined Hastings United on an initial one-month loan deal.

On 16 August 2024, Gale was once again loaned out, this time to National League South side Chelmsford City on an initial one-month loan. In December 2024, Gale was recalled from his loan at Chelmsford, going on to make his league debut for Gillingham, starting in a 1–0 loss away to AFC Wimbledon on 30 December 2024.

On 4 February 2025, Gillingham confirmed that Gale had signed a new contract until the summer of 2027, with a club option of a further year. Having established himself in the starting XI following his return from Chelmsford City, Gale was named as Gillingham's Young Player of the Year at the conclusion of the 2024–25 season.

On 14 November 2025, Gillingham announced that Gale had signed a new contract until the summer of 2028, with a club option of an additional year.

On 8 April 2026 it was announced that Gale had been nominated as EFL League Two Young Player of the Season for 2025–26, with the award ultimately going to Daniel Kanu of Walsall. At the conclusion of the 2025–26 season Gale was again named as Gillingham's Young Player of the Year.

=== Barnsley ===
On 31 July 2026, Gale signed for EFL League One side Barnsley for an undisclosed fee.

== Career statistics ==
As of match played 24 October 2026

Appearances and goals by club, season and competition
Club	Season	League			FA Cup		EFL Cup		Other		Total	
Club	Season	Division	Apps	Goals	Apps	Goals	Apps	Goals	Apps	Goals	Apps	Goals
Gillingham	2021–22	League One	1	0	0	0	0	0	0	0	1	0
Gillingham	2022–23	League Two	0	0	0	0	0	0	0	0	0	0
Gillingham	2023–24	League Two	0	0	0	0	0	0	0	0	0	0
Gillingham	2024–25	League Two	22	0	0	0	0	0	0	0	22	0
Gillingham	2025–26	League Two	41	1	1	0	1	0	1	0	44	1
Total			64	1	1	0	1	0	1	0	67	1
Sheppey United (loan)	2022–23	Isthmian League; South East Division	24	0	0	0	0	0	2 (Note: One appearance in the FA Trophy; one appearance in the Alan Turvey Trophy)	0	26	0
Chelmsford City (loan)	2024–25	National League South	14	0	0	0	0	0	0	0	14	0
Barnsley	2026–27	League One	9	0	0	0	3	0	1	0	13	0
Career total			111	1	1	0	4	0	4	0	120	1

== Honours ==
- Gillingham Young Player of the Year: 2024–25, 2025–26
