= Taite Holtam =

English footballer (born 2005)

Personal information
- Full name: Taite Sean Holtam
- Date of birth: 14 February 2005 (age 21)
- Place of birth: England
- Position: Goalkeeper

Team information
- Current team: Gillingham
- Number: 33

Senior career*
Years	Team	Apps	(Gls)
2024–	Gillingham	2	(0)
2024	→ Herne Bay (loan)	3	(0)
2024	→ Phoenix Sports (loan)	10	(0)
2025	→ Ashford United (loan)	10	(0)
2025	→ Ashford United (loan)	11	(0)
2026	→ Cray Valley PM (loan)	3	(0)
- * Club domestic league appearances and goals as of 12:01, 3 July 2026 (UTC)

Taite Sean Holtam (born 14 February 2005) is an English footballer who plays as a goalkeeper for EFL League Two club Gillingham.

== Career ==
In May 2024, Holtam signed a first professional contract with Gillingham. During the 2024–25 season, he spent time in the Isthmian League South East Division on loan with Herne Bay, Phoenix Sports and Ashford United.

On 12 April 2025, with both of Gillingham's senior goalkeepers unavailable, Holtam made his senior debut for Gillingham, keeping a clean sheet in a 1–0 victory over Milton Keynes Dons. Having impressed on his debut, manager Gareth Ainsworth retained the faith in the young goalkeeper, as opposed to recalling Jake Turner with Holtam featuring against Cheltenham Town.

On 31 July 2025, Holtam signed on a season-long loan for Ashford United. He was recalled in November 2025, later signing a new two-year contract.

On 21 January 2026, Holtam signed on loan for Cray Valley PM until the end of the 2025–26 season.

== Career statistics ==
As of match played 11 November 2025

Appearances and goals by club, season and competition
Club	Season	League			FA Cup		League Cup		Other		Total	
Club	Season	Division	Apps	Goals	Apps	Goals	Apps	Goals	Apps	Goals	Apps	Goals
Gillingham	2024–25	League Two	2	0	0	0	0	0	0	0	2	0
Gillingham	2025–26	League Two	0	0	0	0	0	0	1 (Note: Appearance(s) in EFL Trophy)	0	1	0
Gillingham	Total		2	0	0	0	0	0	1	0	3	0
Herne Bay (loan)	2024–25	Isthmian League South East Division	3	0	0	0	—		0	0	3	0
Phoenix Sports (loan)	2024–25	Isthmian League South East Division	10	0	0	0	—		0	0	10	0
Ashford United (loan)	2024–25	Isthmian League South East Division	10	0	0	0	—		0	0	10	0
Ashford United (loan)	2025–26	Isthmian League South East Division	11	0	2	0	—		3 (Note: Two appearances in FA Trophy, one appearance in Alan Turvey Trophy)	0	16	0
Career total			36	0	2	0	0	0	4	0	42	0
