= Armani Little =

English footballer (born 1997)

Personal information
- Full name: Armani George Little
- Date of birth: 5 April 1997 (age 29)
- Place of birth: Portsmouth, England
- Height: 5 ft 9 in (1.75 m)
- Position: Midfielder

Team information
- Current team: Gillingham
- Number: 8

Youth career
- –2018: Southampton

Senior career*
Years	Team	Apps	(Gls)
2018–2019	Oxford United	1	(0)
2019	→ Woking (loan)	25	(4)
2019–2022	Torquay United	79	(19)
2022–2023	Forest Green Rovers	21	(0)
2023	→ AFC Wimbledon (loan)	18	(0)
2023–2024	AFC Wimbledon	38	(4)
2024–	Gillingham	33	(2)

International career
2022–	England C	1	(0)
- * Club domestic league appearances and goals as of 05:05, 18 June 2025 (UTC)

Armani George Little (born 5 April 1997) is an English footballer who plays as a midfielder for EFL League Two club Gillingham.

== Early life ==
Little was born in Portsmouth.

== Career ==
=== Southampton ===
Having been with Southampton since the age of 12, Little signed his first professional contract with Southampton on 21 April 2015. He was released by Southampton in the summer of 2018.

=== Oxford United ===
On 20 June 2018, Little joined Oxford United on a one-year contract. On 17 August 2018, he joined Woking on a one-month loan. He made his debut for Oxford on 18 December 2018 in a 3–0 EFL Trophy victory at home to Tottenham Hotspur Under-23s. He made his league debut for Oxford on 26 December 2018, coming on as a 71st minute substitute in a 1–0 defeat at home to Southend United, before joining Woking on loan until the end of the season on 4 January 2019. Before his contract expired at Oxford, Little signed a pre-contract agreement with National League club Torquay United.

=== Torquay United ===
Little made his debut for Torquay on 3 August 2019, playing the full 90 minutes in a 2–1 home victory against Boreham Wood.

=== Forest Green Rovers ===
On 8 June 2022, Little agreed a two-year deal to join newly promoted League One club Forest Green Rovers.

On 12 January 2023, Little joined League Two club AFC Wimbledon on loan until the end of the season.

=== AFC Wimbledon ===
On 6 July 2023, Little signed permanently for AFC Wimbledon following a successful loan spell. He scored his first goal for Wimbledon against Tranmere Rovers on 30 September 2023.

=== Gillingham ===
Little joined Gillingham ahead of the 2024–25 season.

== Career statistics ==
As of match played 12 April 2025

Appearances and goals by club, season and competition
Club	Season	League			FA Cup		League Cup		Other		Total	
Club	Season	Division	Apps	Goals	Apps	Goals	Apps	Goals	Apps	Goals	Apps	Goals
Southampton U23	2016–17	—			—		—		1 (Note: Appearance(s) in EFL Trophy)	0	1	0
Southampton U23	2017–18	—			—		—		2	0	2	0
Southampton U23	Total		—		—		—		3	0	3	0
Oxford United	2018–19	League One	1	0	—		0	0	1	0	2	0
Woking (loan)	2018–19	National League South	25	4	4	1	—		3 (Note: Two appearances and one goal in National League South play-offs, one in FA Trophy)	1	32	6
Torquay United	2019–20	National League	17	3	1	0	—		0	0	18	3
Torquay United	2020–21	National League	24	1	2	0	—		5 (Note: Two appearances in National League play-offs, three in the FA Trophy)	0	31	1
Torquay United	2021–22	National League	38	15	2	0	—		1 (Note: Appearance(s) in FA Trophy)	0	41	15
Torquay United	Total		79	19	5	0	—		6	0	90	19
Forest Green Rovers	2022–23	League One	21	0	1	0	2	2	1	0	25	2
AFC Wimbledon (loan)	2022–23	League Two	18	0	0	0	0	0	0	0	18	0
AFC Wimbledon	2023–24	League Two	38	4	3	0	1	0	2	0	44	4
Gillingham	2024–25	League Two	33	2	1	0	0	0	2	0	36	2
Career total			215	29	14	1	2	2	18	1	250	33
