= Lenni Cirino =

Montserratian footballer (born 2003)

Personal information
- Full name: Lenni Rae Rowan Cirino
- Date of birth: 25 January 2003 (age 23)
- Place of birth: England
- Height: 1.79 m (5 ft 10 in)
- Position: Left-back

Team information
- Current team: Hednesford Town

Youth career
- Blackburn Rovers U21

Senior career*
Years	Team	Apps	(Gls)
2021–2024	Blackburn Rovers	0	(0)
2024–2025	Clitheroe	17	(3)
2025–2026	Gillingham	13	(1)
2026-	Hednesford Town	0	(0)

International career^{‡}
2024–	Montserrat	9	(0)
- * Club domestic league appearances and goals as of 02:38, 4 July 2026 (UTC) ‡ National team caps and goals as of 15:49, 13 November 2026 (UTC)

Lenni Rae Rowan Cirino (born 25 January 2003) is a Montserratian football player who plays as a left-back for National League North side Hednesford Town.

== Club career ==
Cirino trained in the academy of Blackburn Rovers, but never made an appearance for the senior club, despite receiving call-ups to it in 2021. On 18 May 2024, the club announced his release as his contract expired.

On 20 September 2024, Cirino joined Northern Premier League West Division club Clitheroe.

In July 2025, Cirino joined League Two club Gillingham on a short-term contract following a successful trial period. Cirino scored his first, and only, goal for the team in a 4–1 home victory over Chesterfield, scoring the hosts' third goal of the game. The goal was eventually shortlisted for Gillingham's Goal of the Season award.

He was released by Gillingham at the end of the 2025–26 season. Following his departure from the Kent side, on 2 July he signed for National League North newcomers Hednesford Town.

== International career ==
Cirino made his debut for the Montserrat national team on 5 June 2024 in a World Cup qualifier against Nicaragua at the Nicaragua National Football Stadium. He started the game and played 70 minutes as Nicaragua won 4–1.

== Personal life ==
Cirino is the older brother of Fleetwood Town defender Raff Cirino.
