= Alex Giles =

English footballer (born 2005)

Personal information
- Date of birth: 29 January 2005 (age 21)
- Height: 1.84 m (6 ft 0 in)
- Position: Defender

Team information
- Current team: Chatham Town

Youth career
- 2014–2022: Gillingham

Senior career*
Years	Team	Apps	(Gls)
2022–2025	Gillingham	0	(0)
2022	→ Sheppey United (loan)	4	(0)
2023	→ Corinthian (loan)	10	(1)
2023–2024	→ Chatham Town (loan)	4	(0)
2024–2025	→ Aveley (loan)	10	(0)
2025–	Chatham Town	39	(0)
- * Club domestic league appearances and goals as of 09:56, 30 April 2026 (UTC)

Alex Giles (born 29 January 2005) is an English professional footballer who plays as a defender for Isthmian Premier Division side Chatham Town.

== Career ==
Giles joined Sheppey United on loan in November 2022, though he was initially sidelined after picking up a nasty cut in his first training session. He signed his first professional contract with Gillingham in the summer of 2023. He made his first-team debut for Gillingham against Portsmouth in an EFL Trophy group stage fixture at Fratton Park in October 2023. On 9 December 2023, he joined Isthmian League Premier Division club Chatham Town on a 28-day loan deal.

In November 2024, Giles joined National League South side Aveley on loan. His parent club recalled him from the loan in January 2025 after 13 appearances in all competitions.

On 14 May 2025, it was announced that Giles had been released by Gillingham upon the expiry of his contract.

On 6 June 2025, Giles signed for Isthmian Premier Division side Chatham Town.

== Style of play ==
Giles operates as a central defender, though he can also provide cover at full-back.

== Career statistics ==
As of match played 29 April 2026

Appearances and goals by club, season and competition
Club	Season	League			FA Cup		EFL Cup		Other		Total	
Club	Season	Division	Apps	Goals	Apps	Goals	Apps	Goals	Apps	Goals	Apps	Goals
Gillingham	2023–24	EFL League Two	0	0	0	0	0	0	1 (Note: Appearance(s) in EFL Trophy)	0	1	0
Gillingham	2024–25	EFL League Two	0	0	0	0	1	0	2	0	3	0
Gillingham	Total		0	0	0	0	1	0	3	0	4	0
Sheppey United (loan)	2022–23	Isthmian League; South East Division	4	0	0	0	—		0	0	4	0
Corinthian (loan)	2022–23	Southern Counties East League; Premier Division	10	1	0	0	—		0	0	10	1
Chatham Town (loan)	2023–24	Isthmian League; Premier Division	4	0	0	0	—		1 (Note: Appearance(s) in Velocity Cup)	0	5	0
Aveley (loan)	2024–25	National League South	10	0	0	0	—		3 (Note: Two appearances in FA Trophy, one appearance in Essex Senior Cup)	0	13	0
Chatham Town	2025–26	Isthmian League Premier Division	39	0	5	1	—		10 (Note: Five appearances in FA Trophy, three appearances in Kent Senior Cup, one appearance in Alan Turvey Trophy, one appearance in the Isthmian League Premier Division play-offs)	0	54	1
Career total			67	1	5	1	1	0	17	0	90	2
