= Stanley Skipper =

English footballer (born 2005)

Personal information
- Date of birth: 29 September 2005 (age 21)
- Height: 1.81 m (5 ft 11 in)
- Position: Midfielder

Team information
- Current team: Gillingham
- Number: 26

Youth career
- Arsenal
- 2022–2024: Gillingham

Senior career*
Years	Team	Apps	(Gls)
2023–2026	Gillingham	0	(0)
2024	→ Ashford United (loan)	7	(0)
2024	→ Bowers & Pitsea (loan)	0	(0)
- * Club domestic league appearances and goals as of 00:48, 3 November 2024 (UTC)

Stanley Skipper (born 29 September 2005) is a professional footballer who plays as a midfielder for EFL League Two club Gillingham.

== Early life ==
Stanley Skipper was born on 29 September 2005. He is the nephew of former Chelsea player Frank Lampard.

== Career ==
Skipped ended the 2023–24 season on loan at Isthmian League South East Division club Ashford United, playing a total of seven games. He turned professional at Gillingham in May 2024 after being named the club's academy player of the year. On 25 October 2024, he joined Isthmian League Premier Division club Bowers & Pitsea on a 28-day loan agreement.

He was released by Gillingham at the end of the 2025–26 season.

== Career statistics ==
As of match played 27 April 2024

Appearances and goals by club, season and competition
Club	Season	League			FA Cup		EFL Cup		Other		Total	
Club	Season	Division	Apps	Goals	Apps	Goals	Apps	Goals	Apps	Goals	Apps	Goals
Gillingham	2023–24	EFL League Two	0	0	0	0	0	0	1 (Note: Appearance(s) in EFL Trophy)	0	1	0
Gillingham	2024–25	EFL League Two	0	0	0	0	0	0	1	0	1	0
Gillingham	Total		0	0	0	0	0	0	2	0	2	0
Ashford United (loan)	2023–24	Isthmian League; South East Division	7	0	0	0	0	0	0	0	7	0
Bowers & Pitsea (loan)	2024–25	Isthmian League; Premier Division	0	0	0	0	0	0	0	0	0	0
Career total			7	0	0	0	0	0	2	0	9	0
