= 2024–25 Gillingham F.C. season =

English football club season

Gillingham
2024–25 season
- Owner: Brad Galinson
- Chairman: Brad Galinson
- Manager: Mark Bonner (until 5 January); John Coleman (between 5 Jan–25 Mar); Gareth Ainsworth (from 25 March)
- Stadium: Priestfield Stadium
- League Two: 17th
- FA Cup: First round
- EFL Cup: First round
- EFL Trophy: Group stage
- Top goalscorer: League: Jayden Clarke (7); All: Jayden Clarke (7)
| Home colours | Away colours |

The 2024–25 season was the 132nd season in the history of Gillingham Football Club and their third consecutive season in League Two. In addition to the domestic league, the club would also participate in the FA Cup, the EFL Cup, and the EFL Trophy.

== Transfers ==
=== In ===
| Date | Pos. | Player | From | Fee | Ref. |
|---|---|---|---|---|---|
| 14 June 2024 (Note: The transfer was announced on 4 June, and would become official on June 14 once the transfer window re-opened) | LW | Jack Nolan (ENG) | Accrington Stanley (ENG) | Undisclosed | |
| 1 July 2024 (Note: The transfer was announced on 31 May, and would become official on July 1 once his AFC Wimbledon contract expired) | CM | Armani Little (ENG) | AFC Wimbledon (ENG) | Free | |
| 1 July 2024 (Note: The transfer was announced on 24 May, and would become official on July 1 once his Crewe Alexandra contract expired) | CF | Elliott Nevitt (ENG) | Crewe Alexandra (ENG) | Free | |
| 1 July 2024 (Note: The transfer was announced on 7 June, and would become official on July 1 once his Huddersfield Town contract expired) | RM | Aaron Rowe (ENG) | Huddersfield Town (ENG) | Free | |
| 22 July 2024 | CF | Marcus Wyllie (ENG) | Enfield Town (ENG) | Undisclosed | |
| 6 August 2024 | CM | Euan Williams (ENG) | Charlton Athletic (ENG) | Free | |
| 15 August 2024 | AM | Bradley Dack (ENG) | Sunderland (ENG) | Free | |
| 17 January 2025 | DM | Nelson Khumbeni (MWI) | Bolton Wanderers (ENG) | Undisclosed | |

=== Out ===
| Date | Pos. | Player | To | Fee | Ref. |
|---|---|---|---|---|---|
| 28 June 2024 | LB | Scott Malone (ENG) | Crawley Town (ENG) | Undisclosed | |
| 18 July 2024 | RM | Dom Jefferies (WAL) | Lincoln City (ENG) | Undisclosed | |
| 1 January 2025 (Note: The transfer was announced on December 30, and would become official on January 1 once the transfer window re-opened) | CM | George Lapslie (ENG) | Bradford City (ENG) | Undisclosed | |

=== Loaned in ===
| Date | Pos. | Player | From | Date until | Ref. |
|---|---|---|---|---|---|
| 2 August 2024 | CF | Jacob Wakeling (ENG) | Peterborough United (ENG) | End of season | |
| 30 August 2024 | GK | Luca Ashby-Hammond (ENG) | Fulham (ENG) | 17 January 2025 (Note: On 17 January, Ashby-Hammond was recalled back to his parent club Fulham) | |
| 10 January 2025 | LW | Asher Agbinone (ENG) | Crystal Palace (ENG) | End of season | |
| 24 January 2025 | CF | Jimmy-Jay Morgan (ENG) | Chelsea (ENG) | End of season | |
| 3 February 2025 | DM | Dominic Corness (ENG) | Liverpool (ENG) | End of season | |
| 3 February 2025 | CB | Andy Smith (ENG) | Hull City (ENG) | End of season | |

=== Loaned out ===
| Date | Pos. | Player | To | Date until | Ref. |
|---|---|---|---|---|---|
| 2 August 2024 | CF | Ashley Nadesan (ENG) | Sutton United (ENG) | End of season | |
| 8 August 2024 | GK | Taite Holtam (ENG) | Herne Bay (ENG) | 5 September 2024 | |
| 16 August 2024 | DM | Sam Gale (ENG) | Chelmsford City (ENG) | 14 September 2024 | |
| 17 September 2024 | CF | Harry Bridle (ENG) | Sheppey United (ENG) | 15 October 2024 | |
| 16 October 2024 | GK | Taite Holtam (ENG) | Phoenix Sports (ENG) | 12 December 2024 (Note: On 14 November, Holtam's loan at Phoenix Sports was extended by a further 28-days) | |
| 25 October 2024 | CM | Stanley Skipper (ENG) | Bowers & Pitsea (ENG) | 22 November 2024 | |
| 5 November 2024 | CB | Alex Giles (ENG) | Aveley (ENG) | 13 January 2025 (Note: On 13 January, Giles was recalled back from his loan at Aveley) | |
| 12 November 2024 | CF | Harry Bridle (ENG) | Herne Bay (ENG) | 10 December 2024 | |
| 12 December 2024 | CF | Harry Bridle (ENG) | Whitehawk (ENG) | End of Season | |
| 11 January 2025 | CF | Joshua Bayliss (SCO) | Margate (ENG) | 8 February 2025 | |
| 17 January 2025 | GK | Taite Holtam (ENG) | Ashford United (ENG) | 15 February 2025 | |
| 3 February 2025 | DM | Timothée Dieng (FRA) | Cheltenham Town (ENG) | End of season | |
| 7 February 2025 | CF | Jimmy Heasman (ENG) | Sheppey United (ENG) | 7 March 2025 | |
| 8 February 2025 | RB | Harry Webster (ENG) | Chatham Town (ENG) | 7 March 2025 | |
| 13 February 2025 | CM | Harry Waldock (ENG) | Ashford United (ENG) | 13 March 2025 | |
| 14 February 2025 | CM | Stanley Skipper (ENG) | Ashford United (ENG) | 14 March 2025 | |
| 14 March 2025 | CF | Marcus Wyllie (CYP) | Dagenham & Redridge (ENG) | End of season | |
| 25 March 2025 | GK | Jake Turner (ENG) | Dagenham & Redbridge (ENG) | End of season | |

=== Released / Out of Contract ===
| Date | Pos | Player | Subsequent club | Joined date | Ref |
|---|---|---|---|---|---|
| 30 June 2024 | CM | Kieron Agbebi (ENG) | Dover Athletic (ENG) | 6 July 2024 | |
| 30 June 2024 | CM | Leighton Murray (ENG) | Canterbury City (ENG) | 27 July 2024 | |
| 30 June 2024 | CM | Josh Chambers (ENG) | Folkestone Invicta (ENG) | 6 August 2024 | |
| 30 June 2024 | RB | Ike Orji (ENG) | Chelmsford City (ENG) | 7 August 2024 | |
| 30 June 2024 | CB | Dami Taiwo-Pratt (ENG) | Dulwich Hamlet (ENG) | 9 August 2024 | |
| 30 June 2024 | CF | Ronald Sithole (ENG) | Whitehawk (ENG) | 24 August 2024 | |
| 30 June 2024 | GK | Nathan Harvey (ENG) | Dagenham & Redbridge (ENG) | 29 August 2024 | |
| 30 June 2024 | CF | Macauley Bonne (ZIM) | Southend United (ENG) | 9 September 2024 | |
| 30 June 2024 | DM | Shaun Williams (IRL) | Eastbourne Borough (ENG) | 14 September 2024 | |
| 30 June 2024 | LW | Matthew Macarthur (AUS) | Farnborough (ENG) | 6 November 2024 | |
| 30 June 2024 | GK | Tobey Smith (ENG) | | | |
| 30 June 2024 | CB | Josh Woodliffe (ENG) | | | |

== Pre-season and friendlies ==
On 17 May, Gillingham announced their first pre-season friendly, against Dartford. Five days later, a second fixture was confirmed against Watford. A third and fourth was then shortly added to the schedule, against Southend United and Woking. In June, a fifth friendly was added to the clubs schedule, versus Millwall.

Win Draw Loss Fixtures

| 13 July 2024 Friendly | Gillingham | 0–0 | Millwall | Gillingham |
| 13:00 BST | | Report | | Stadium: Priestfield Stadium; Attendance: 4,442; Referee: Carl Brook |

| 20 July 2024 Friendly | Gillingham | 2–0 | Watford | Gillingham |
| 15:00 BST | Trialist 27'; Nolan 69' | Report | | Stadium: Priestfield Stadium; Attendance: 2,922; Referee: Sebastian Stockbridge |

| 23 July 2024 Friendly | Dartford | 0–4 | Gillingham | Dartford |
| 19:45 BST | | Report | Clarke 54', 57'; Bridle 70', 90' | Stadium: Princes Park; Attendance: 1,008; Referee: Ben Atkinson |

| 27 July 2024 Friendly | Southend United | 1–3 | Gillingham | Southend-on-Sea |
| 13:00 BST | Walker 46' | Report | Nolan 42'; Clarke 44'; Ndi 58' (o.g.) | Stadium: Roots Hall; Attendance: 2,225; Referee: Danial Baines |

| 3 August 2024 Friendly | Woking | 1–1 | Gillingham | Woking |
| 15:00 BST | Kendall 50' | Report | Wakeling 45' | Stadium: Kingfield Stadium; Attendance: 765 |

== Competitions ==
=== League Two ===
==== League table ====
| Pos | Team | Pld | W | D | L | GF | GA | GD | Pts |
|---|---|---|---|---|---|---|---|---|---|
| 15 | Cheltenham Town | 46 | 16 | 12 | 18 | 60 | 70 | −10 | 60 |
| 16 | Barrow | 46 | 15 | 14 | 17 | 52 | 50 | +2 | 59 |
| 17 | Gillingham | 46 | 14 | 16 | 16 | 41 | 46 | −5 | 58 |
| 18 | Harrogate Town | 46 | 14 | 11 | 21 | 43 | 61 | −18 | 53 |
| 19 | Milton Keynes Dons | 46 | 14 | 10 | 22 | 52 | 66 | −14 | 52 |

Source: EFL Official Website
Rules for classification: 1) Points; 2) Goal difference; 3) Number of goals scored; 4) Head-to-head results; 5) Wins; 6) Away goals; 7) Penalty points (sec 9.5); 8) 12-point sending off offences

==== Results summary ====
| Overall | | | | | | | | Home | | | | | | Away | | | | | |
| Pld | W | D | L | GF | GA | GD | Pts | W | D | L | GF | GA | GD | W | D | L | GF | GA | GD |
|---|---|---|---|---|---|---|---|---|---|---|---|---|---|---|---|---|---|---|---|
| 44 | 13 | 15 | 16 | 39 | 45 | −6 | 54 | 10 | 4 | 8 | 23 | 19 | +4 | 3 | 11 | 8 | 16 | 26 | −10 |

Last updated: 21 April 2025.
Source: Soccerway

==== Results by round ====
| Round | 1 | 2 | 3 | 4 | 5 | 6 | 7 | 8 | 9 | 10 | 11 | 12 | 13 | 14 | 15 | 17 | 18 | 19 | 20 | 21 | 22 | 23 | 24 | 27 | 28 | 29 | 30 | 31 | 16^{1} | 32 | 33 | 26^{3} | 34 | 35 | 36 | 37 | 38 | 39 | 40 | 41 | 25^{2} | 42 | 43 | 44 |
|---|---|---|---|---|---|---|---|---|---|---|---|---|---|---|---|---|---|---|---|---|---|---|---|---|---|---|---|---|---|---|---|---|---|---|---|---|---|---|---|---|---|---|---|---|
| Ground | H | A | A | H | A | H | A | H | H | A | H | A | H | A | H | H | A | H | A | H | A | A | H | H | A | A | H | A | A | H | A | H | H | A | H | A | H | A | H | A | A | H | A | H |
| Result | W | W | D | W | L | W | W | W | L | L | L | L | L | D | W | L | L | W | W | D | L | L | L | L | D | D | L | L | D | D | D | L | W | L | W | D | D | D | D | D | D | W | D | W |
| Position | 2 | 2 | 1 | 1 | 4 | 2 | 2 | 1 | 1 | 2 | 5 | 6 | 11 | 11 | 8 | 11 | 12 | 10 | 9 | 10 | 13 | 13 | 14 | 16 | 17 | 17 | 17 | 19 | 19 | 20 | 19 | 19 | 18 | 19 | 19 | 19 | 19 | 19 | 19 | 18 | 17 | 17 | 17 | 17 |
| Points | 3 | 6 | 7 | 10 | 10 | 13 | 16 | 19 | 19 | 19 | 19 | 19 | 19 | 20 | 23 | 23 | 23 | 26 | 29 | 30 | 30 | 30 | 30 | 30 | 31 | 32 | 32 | 32 | 33 | 34 | 35 | 35 | 38 | 38 | 41 | 42 | 43 | 44 | 45 | 46 | 47 | 50 | 51 | 54 |

Source: EFL
A = Away; H = Home; W = Win; D = Draw; L = Loss; P = Postponed
Notes:
- ^{1} Matchday 16 (vs. Walsall) was postponed due to international call-ups.
- ^{2} Matchday 25 (vs. Chesterfield) was postponed due to adverse weather conditions.
- ^{3} Matchday 26 (vs. Fleetwood Town) was postponed due to a frozen pitch.

==== Matches ====
On 26 June, the League Two fixtures were announced.

Win Draw Loss Fixtures

| 10 August 2024 1 | Gillingham | 4–1 | Carlisle United | Gillingham |
| 15:00 BST | Dieng 2'; Rowe (yellow card) 26'; Wakeling 48', (yellow card) 54'; Turner (yellow card) 71'; Nolan 77'; Williams 87' | Report | Mellish 65' | Stadium: Priestfield Stadium; Attendance: 7,037; Referee: Ben Atkinson |

| 17 August 2024 2 | Morecambe | 0–1 | Gillingham | Morecambe |
| 15:00 BST | | Report | Hutton (yellow card) 65'; Lapslie 76' | Stadium: Mazuma Mobile Stadium; Attendance: 3,611; Referee: Daniel Middleton |

| 24 August 2024 3 | Fleetwood Town | 0–0 | Gillingham | Fleetwood |
| 15:00 BST | Helm (yellow card) 11'; Wiredu (yellow card) 27'; Holgate (yellow card) 80' | Report | Dieng (yellow card) 11'; Little (yellow card) 29'; Ehmer (yellow card) 38'; Rowe (yellow card) 90+1' | Stadium: Highbury Stadium; Referee: Scott Jackson |

| 31 August 2024 4 | Gillingham | 1–0 | Chesterfield | Gillingham |
| 12:30 BST | Robbie Mackenzie | Report | | Stadium: Priestfield Stadium; Attendance: 6954; Referee: Charles Breakspear |
Note: Fixture was initially scheduled for a 15:00 kick-off, but was moved for live Sky Sports broadcast.

| 7 September 2024 5 | Doncaster Rovers | 1–0 | Gillingham | Doncaster |
| 15:00 BST | Sharp 30'; Sterry (yellow card) 39' | Report | Nevitt (yellow card) 50' | Stadium: Eco-Power Stadium; Attendance: 7,546; Referee: Thomas Parsons |

| 14 September 2024 6 | Gillingham | 3–0 | Tranmere Rovers | Gillingham |
| 15:00 GMT | Lapslie (yellow card) 35'; Coleman (yellow card) 37' (yellow-red card) 61'; Little 48'; Hutton (yellow card) 73'; Clarke 82', 89' | Report | | Stadium: Priestfield Stadium; Attendance: 6,660; Referee: Will Finnie |

| 21 September 2024 7 | Notts County | 0–1 | Gillingham | Nottingham |
| 15:00 BST | Abbott (yellow card) 3'; McGoldrick (yellow card) 83'; Bedeau (yellow card) 90+3' | Report | Clark (yellow card) 8'; Nevitt 38'; Clarke (yellow card) 44'; Ogie (yellow card) 62'; Ehmer (yellow card) 83' | Stadium: Meadow Lane; Attendance: 14,747; Referee: Lee Swabey |

| 28 September 2024 8 | Gillingham | 2–0 | Barrow | Gillingham |
| 15:00 GMT | Clarke 17', (yellow card) 71'; Clark (yellow card) 19'; Hutton (yellow card) 55'; McKenzie 62'; Nevitt (yellow card) 69'; Williams (yellow card) 90+3' | Report | Jackson (yellow card) 61'; Popov (yellow card) 90+3' | Stadium: Priestfield Stadium; Attendance: 7,166; Referee: Neil Hair |

| 1 October 2024 9 | Gillingham | 0–1 | Grimsby Town | Gillingham |
| 19:45 GMT | Morris (yellow card) 50' | Report | Green 21', (yellow card) 81'; McJannet (yellow card) 25'; Hume (yellow card) 51'; Pyke (yellow card) 66'; Khouri (yellow card) 88'; Rodgers (yellow card) 90+6' | Stadium: Priestfield Stadium; Attendance: 5,652; Referee: Carl Brook |

| 5 October 2024 10 | Crewe Alexandra | 2–0 | Gillingham | Crewe |
| 15:00 BST | Lankester (yellow card) 16'; Tracey 17', 60'; Breckin (yellow card) 33'; Holíček (yellow card) 81' | Report | | Stadium: Gresty Road; Attendance: 5,000; Referee: Anthony Backhouse |

| 12 October 2024 11 | Gillingham | 1–2 | Accrington Stanley | Gillingham |
| 15:00 BST | Little 49', (yellow card) 89' | Report | Woods 60'; Love (yellow card) 66'; Walton (yellow card) 85'; Awe (yellow card) 90'; Costelloe 90+4' | Stadium: Priestfield Stadium; Attendance: 6,622; Referee: Paul Howard |

| 19 October 2024 12 | Bradford City | 2–1 | Gillingham | Bradford |
| 15:00 BST | Wright (yellow card) 24'; Byrne 38', (yellow card) 70'; Shepherd 45+3', (yellow card) 61'; Halliday (yellow card) 82'; Pointon (yellow card) 83' | Report | Clarke 11', (yellow card) 24'; Dieng (yellow card) 22'; Clark (yellow card) 42'; Coleman (yellow card) 45+4' | Stadium: Valley Parade; Attendance: 16,471; Referee: Ross Joyce |

| 22 October 2024 13 | Gillingham | 0–2 | Newport County | Gillingham |
| 19:45 GMT | Clark (yellow card) 16'; Coleman (yellow card) 36' | Report | Baker 16'; Brennan (yellow card) 24'; Hudlin 33'; Jameson (yellow card) 49' | Stadium: Priestfield Stadium; Attendance: 5,262; Referee: Farai Hallam |

| 26 October 2024 14 | Swindon Town | 1–1 | Gillingham | Swindon |
| 15:00 BST | Hall (red card) 9'; Clarke (yellow card) 45+6'; Smith 90+3' | Report | Dieng 16'; Williams (yellow card) 61'; Hawkins (yellow card) 81' | Stadium: County Ground; Attendance: 7,325; Referee: Anthony Backhouse |

| 9 November 2024 15 | Gillingham | 1–0 | Port Vale | Gillingham |
| 15:00 GMT | Coleman (yellow card) 72'; Clarke 79'; Nolan (yellow card) 86' | Report | Stockley (yellow card) 40' | Stadium: Priestfield Stadium; Attendance: 6,267; Referee: Alan Young |

| 23 November 2024 17 | Gillingham | 1–2 | Harrogate Town | Gillingham |
| 15:00 GMT | Dieng 51'; Ogie (yellow card) 55'; Lapslie (yellow card) 78' | Report | O'Connor 59'; March 71'; Asare (yellow card) 90+6' | Stadium: Priestfield Stadium; Attendance: 5,611; Referee: Matthew Russell |

| 4 December 2024 18 | Bromley | 2–1 | Gillingham | Bromley |
| 19:45 GMT | Congreve 54'; Thompson (yellow card) 65'; Arthurs 71' | Report | McKenzie 56'; Andrews (yellow card) 90+1' | Stadium: Hayes Lane; Attendance: 3,438; Referee: Alex Chilowicz |
Note: Fixture was initially scheduled for 3 December, but was moved due to Bromley being in FA Cup action on the preceding Sunday.

| 7 December 2024 19 | Gillingham | 1–0 | Salford City | Gillingham |
| 15:00 GMT | Clarke 48', (yellow card) 73'; McKenzie (yellow card) 90+1' | Report | Lund (yellow card) 25'; Tilt (yellow card) 73' | Stadium: Priestfield Stadium; Attendance: 5,296; Referee: Tom Nield |

| 14 December 2024 20 | Milton Keynes Dons | 0–1 | Gillingham | Denbigh |
| 15:00 GMT | | Report | Rowe (yellow card) 27'; Ehmer (yellow card) 37'; McKenzie 59', (yellow card) 90' | Stadium: Stadium MK; Attendance: 7,191; Referee: Dale Baines |

| 20 December 2024 21 | Gillingham | 2–2 | Cheltenham Town | Gillingham |
| 19:45 GMT | Clarke 24'; Lapslie 68' | Report | Jude-Boyd (yellow card) 32'; Young 36'; Miller 60'; Bakare (yellow card) 90+1' | Stadium: Priestfield Stadium; Attendance: 5,938; Referee: Carl Brook |

| 26 December 2024 22 | Colchester United | 2–0 | Gillingham | Colchester |
| 15:00 GMT | Taylor 6'; Egbo (yellow card) 75'; McDonnell (yellow card) 77'; Gordon 85' | Report | Ogie (yellow card) 86'; Clarke (yellow card) 90' | Stadium: Colchester Community Stadium; Attendance: 5,934; Referee: Farai Hallam |

| 30 December 2024 23 | AFC Wimbledon | 1–0 | Gillingham | Wimbledon |
| 20:00 GMT | Stevens 50', (yellow card) 56'; Ogundere (yellow card) 83' | Report | Gale (yellow card) 56'; Little (yellow card) 74'; Dack (yellow card) 77'; Ehmer (yellow card) 90+5' | Stadium: Plough Lane; Attendance: 8,281; Referee: Sam Purkiss |
Note: Fixture was initially scheduled for 29 December, but was moved for live Sky Sports broadcast.

| 2 January 2025 24 | Gillingham | 0–3 | Bromley | Gillingham |
| 19:45 GMT | Little (yellow card) 53' | Report | Dennis 7'; Arthurs 26'; Grant 76' | Stadium: Priestfield Stadium; Attendance: 7,454; Referee: Ben Atkinson |
Note: Fixture was initially scheduled for 1 January, but was moved back a day.

| 18 January 2025 27 | Gillingham | 0–1 | Doncaster Rovers | Gillingham |
| 12:30 GMT | Little (yellow card) 6' | Report | Olowu (yellow card) 17'; Molyneux 33', (yellow card) 90+1'; Street (yellow card) 70'; Broadbent (yellow card) 90' | Stadium: Priestfield Stadium; Attendance: 5,814; Referee: Lee Swabey |
Note: Fixture was initially scheduled for a 15:00 kick-off, but was moved for live Sky Sports broadcasting.

| 25 January 2025 28 | Tranmere Rovers | 1–1 | Gillingham | Birkenhead |
| 15:00 GMT | Solomon 17' | Report | Dack (yellow card) 10'; Turnbull 44' (o.g.) | Stadium: Prenton Park; Attendance: 7,325; Referee: Michael Barlow |

| 28 January 2025 29 | Grimsby Town | 1–1 | Gillingham | Cleethorpes |
| 19:45 GMT | Rose 90+7' | Report | Tharme 35' (o.g.); Khumbeni (yellow card) 56'; Little (yellow card) 69' | Stadium: Blundell Park; Attendance: 4,239; Referee: Simon Mather |

| 1 February 2025 30 | Gillingham | 1–2 | Notts County | Gillingham |
| 12:30 GMT | Ogie (yellow card) 25'; Ehmer (yellow card) 45+1'; McKenzie (yellow card) 52'; Nevitt (yellow card) 59'; Gbode (yellow card) 60', (goal) 80' | Report | Tsaroulla 17'; McGoldrick 20'; Jones (yellow card) 44'; McDonald (yellow card) 60'; Jarvis (yellow card) 90+1'; Abbott (yellow card) 90+2' | Stadium: Priestfield Stadium; Attendance: 6,031; Referee: Tom Reeves |
Note: Fixture was initially scheduled for a 15:00 kick-off, but was moved for live Sky Sports broadcasting.

| 8 February 2025 31 | Barrow | 3–0 | Gillingham | Barrow-in-Furness |
| 15:00 GMT | Campbell (yellow card) 17'; Spence 60', 84'; Smith 90+5' | Report | Dack (yellow card) 28' | Stadium: Holker Street; Attendance: 3,130; Referee: Ross Joyce |

| 11 February 2025 16 | Walsall | 1–1 | Gillingham | Bescot |
| 19:45 GMT | Okagbue (yellow card) 6'; Williams (yellow card) 43'; Matt 49'; Jellis (yellow card) 58'; Barrett (yellow card) 59' | Report | Hutton (yellow card) 59'; Corness (yellow card) 62'; McKenzie 68' | Stadium: Bescot Stadium; Attendance: 6,229; Referee: Thomas Parsons |
Note: Fixture was originally scheduled for 16 November, but was postponed due to international call-ups within the Walsall squad.

| 15 February 2025 32 | Gillingham | 0–0 | Crewe Alexandra | Gillingham |
| 15:00 GMT | Ehmer (yellow card) 70' | Report | Tracey (yellow card) 45+1'; Cooney (yellow card) 58' (yellow-red card) 75'; O'Riordan (yellow card) 90' | Stadium: Priestfield Stadium; Attendance: 5,663; Referee: Jamie O'Connor |

| 22 February 2025 33 | Carlisle United | 0–0 | Gillingham | Carlisle |
| 15:00 GMT | Ellis (yellow card) 80'; Harris (yellow card) 90+1' | Report | Hutton (yellow card) 6'; Ehmer (yellow card) 77' | Stadium: Brunton Park; Attendance: 6,976; Referee: Scott Jackson |

| 25 February 2025 26 | Gillingham | 1–2 | Fleetwood Town | Gillingham |
| 19:45 GMT | | | | Stadium: Priestfield Stadium |
Note: Fixture was originally scheduled for 11 January, but was postponed due to a frozen pitch.

| 1 March 2025 34 | Gillingham | 1–0 | Morecambe | Gillingham |
| 15:00 GMT | Gbode (yellow card) 69'; McKenzie 79'; Nevitt (yellow card) 86'; Morgan (yellow card) 90+2' | Report | Tutonda (yellow card) 70'; Hendrie (yellow card) 72' | Stadium: Priestfield Stadium; Attendance: 5,612; Referee: Ruebyn Ricardo |

| 4 March 2025 35 | Newport County | 3–1 | Gillingham | Newport |
| 19:45 GMT | Kamwa 9', 27', 30'; Warner (yellow card) 15'; Baker-Richardson (yellow card) 89'; Antwi (yellow card) 89'; Clarke (yellow card) 90+1' | Report | Smith (yellow card) 62'; Morgan 69'; Ehmer (yellow card) 71'; Gale (yellow card) 79'; Gbode (yellow card) 79'; Nevitt (yellow card) 90+1'; Little (yellow card) 90+3' | Stadium: Rodney Parade; Attendance: 3,396; Referee: Aaron Bannister |

| 8 March 2025 36 | Gillingham | 1–0 | Bradford City | Gillingham |
| 15:00 GMT | Masterson (yellow card) 3', (goal) 56'; Little (yellow card) 12'; Morgan (yellow card) 19'; Hutton (yellow card) 88'; Nevitt (yellow card) 90+3' | Report | Huntington (yellow card) 45+1'; Shepherd (yellow card) 83' | Stadium: Priestfield Stadium; Attendance: 6,297; Referee: James Durkin |

| 15 March 2025 37 | Accrington Stanley | 1–1 | Gillingham | Accrington |
| 15:00 GMT | Ward (yellow card) 38', (goal) 45+3'; Matthews (yellow card) 56'; Whitmarsh (yellow card) 58'; Conneely (yellow card) 60'; Woods (yellow card) 77'; Walton (yellow card) 81'; Coyle (yellow card) 90+3' | Report | Gale (yellow card) 43'; Armani Little (yellow card) 77'; Clark 90+4' | Stadium: Crown Ground; Attendance: 2,449; Referee: Charles Breakspear |

| 22 March 2025 38 | Gillingham | 0–0 | Walsall | Gillingham |
| 15:00 GMT | Little (yellow card) 90+5' | Report | McEntee (yellow card) 36'; Asiimwe (yellow card) 61' | Stadium: Priestfield Stadium; Attendance: 6,153; Referee: Andrew Humphries |

| 29 March 2025 39 | Harrogate Town | 1–1 | Gillingham | Harrogate |
| 15:00 GMT | March (yellow card) 11', (goal) 40' (pen.); O'Connor (yellow card) 81' | Report | Morris (yellow card) 39'; Clark (yellow card) 43', (goal) 68' (pen.); Smith (yellow card) 60'; Williams (yellow card) 81'; Masterson (yellow card) 85' | Stadium: Wetherby Road; Attendance: 3,253; Referee: David Rock |

| 1 April 2025 40 | Gillingham | 1–1 | Colchester United | Gillingham |
| 19:45 BST | Clark 77' (pen.) | Report | Payne 20'; Hunt (yellow card) 45+8'; Iandolo (yellow card) 48'; Simpson (yellow card) 51'; Thorn (yellow card) 75'; Egbo (yellow card) 77' | Stadium: Priestfield Stadium; Attendance: 5,924; Referee: James Linington |

| 5 April 2025 41 | Salford City | 2–2 | Gillingham | Kersal |
| 15:00 BST | Stockton 8', (yellow card) 90+3'; N'Mai 15', (yellow card) 45+3'; Garbutt (yellow card) 73' | Report | Nevitt 2', (yellow card) 90'; McKenzie (yellow card) 10'; Hutton 24', (yellow card) 55'; Little (yellow card) 65' | Stadium: Moor Lane; Attendance: 2,914; Referee: Will Finnie |

| 8 April 2025 25 | Chesterfield | 1–1 | Gillingham | Chesterfield |
| 19:45 BST | Grigg 77' | Report | Nevitt (yellow card) 14'; Gale (yellow card) 48'; Rowe (yellow card) 65' | Stadium: SMH Group Stadium; Attendance: 7,810; Referee: Martin Woods |
Note: Fixture was initially scheduled for 4 January, but was moved due to playing the Thursday prior. The match was then postponed on that date due to adverse weather conditions.

| 12 April 2025 42 | Gillingham | 1–0 | Milton Keynes Dons | Gillingham |
| 15:00 BST | Gbode (yellow card) 65'; Dack 90+5' | Report | Offord (yellow card) 34'; Sanders (yellow card) 64'; Gilbey (yellow card) 81'; Thompson-Sommers (yellow card) 84' | Stadium: Priestfield Stadium; Attendance: 6,080; Referee: Rob Massey-Ellis |

| 18 April 2025 43 | Cheltenham Town | 1–1 | Gillingham | Cheltenham |
| 15:00 BST | Stubbs 22'; Taylor (yellow card) 66' | Report | Morgan 2'; Hutton (yellow card) 57'; Nevitt (yellow card) 76' | Stadium: Whaddon Road; Attendance: 4,702; Referee: Graham Scott |

| 21 April 2025 44 | Gillingham | 1–0 | AFC Wimbledon | Gillingham |
| 15:00 BST | Gbode 64'; Rowe (yellow card) 81'; Clarke (yellow card) 86'; Hutton (yellow card) 90+2' | Report | Foyo (yellow card) 44'; Hutchinson (yellow card) 83' | Stadium: Priestfield Stadium; Attendance: 7,641; Referee: Gavin Ward |

| 26 April 2025 45 | Gillingham | 1–1 | Swindon Town | Gillingham |
| 15:00 BST | Gale (yellow card) 13'; Gbode 61' (yellow card) 69' (yellow-red card) 90+4'; Williams (yellow card) 67' (yellow-red card) 90+3' | Report | Tshimanga (yellow card) 45'; Wright 67'; Glatzel (yellow card) 78'; Freckleton (yellow card) 90+4' | Stadium: Priestfield Stadium; Attendance: 7,669; Referee: Neil Hair |

| 3 May 2025 46 | Port Vale | 0–1 | Gillingham | Burslem |
| 15:00 BST | Clark (yellow card) 81' | Report | Rowe 56'; Hutton (yellow card) 67'; McKenzie (yellow card) 86' | Stadium: Vale Park; Attendance: 13,661; Referee: Jacob Miles |

=== FA Cup ===
Gillingham were drawn at home to Blackpool in the first round.

Win Draw Loss Fixtures

| 2 November 2024 First round | Gillingham | 0–2 | Blackpool | Gillingham |
| 15:00 GMT | | Report | Lawrence-Gabriel (yellow card) 34'; Carey 38', 90+4', (yellow card) 78'; Finnigan (yellow card) 44' | Stadium: Priestfield Stadium; Attendance: 4,403; Referee: Carl Brook |

=== EFL Cup ===
On 27 June, the draw for the first round was made, with Gillingham being drawn away against Swansea City.

Win Draw Loss Fixtures

| 13 August 2024 First round | Swansea City | 3–1 | Gillingham | Swansea |
| 19:45 BST | Pedersen (yellow card) 19'; Ronald 24'; Abdulai (yellow card) 50', (goal) 90+6'; Cullen 70' | Report | Williams (red card) 51'; Hawkins 87' | Stadium: Swansea.com Stadium; Attendance: 6,019; Referee: David Rock |

=== EFL Trophy ===
In the group stage, Gillingham were drawn into Southern Group D alongside Peterborough United, Stevenage and Crystal Palace U21.

| Pos | Div | Team | Pld | W | PW | PL | L | GF | GA | GD | Pts | Qualification |
|---|---|---|---|---|---|---|---|---|---|---|---|---|
| 1 | L1 | Peterborough United | 3 | 3 | 0 | 0 | 0 | 8 | 2 | +6 | 9 | Advance to Round 2 |
| 2 | L1 | Stevenage | 3 | 1 | 0 | 1 | 1 | 2 | 3 | −1 | 4 | Advance to Round 2 |
| 3 | ACA | Crystal Palace U21 | 3 | 1 | 0 | 0 | 2 | 4 | 6 | −2 | 3 | |
| 4 | L2 | Gillingham | 3 | 0 | 1 | 0 | 2 | 3 | 6 | −3 | 2 | |

Source: EFL

Win Draw Loss Fixtures

| 3 September 2024 Group stage | Gillingham | 1–2 | Peterborough United | Gillingham |
| 19:00 BST | Dack (yellow card) 44'; Ehmer (yellow card) 73'; Nevitt 90+3' | Report | Jones 12'; Dornelly (yellow card) 44'; Ihionvien 75' | Stadium: Priestfield Stadium; Attendance: 1,657; Referee: Craig Hicks |

| 24 September 2024 Group stage | Gillingham | 1–3 | Crystal Palace U21 | Gillingham |
| 15:00 BST | Little (yellow card) 24'; Ogie (yellow card) 55'; Waldock (yellow card) 59'; Wyllie 80'; Clarke (yellow card) 87' | Report | Umolu 25'; Umeh 39'; Mustapha 52', (yellow card) 60'; Grehan (yellow card) 61'; Agbinone (penalty missed) 83', (yellow card) 87' | Stadium: Priestfield Stadium; Attendance: 1,223; Referee: Ruebyn Ricardo |

| 12 November 2024 Group stage | Stevenage | 1–1 | Gillingham | Stevenage |
| 19:00 GMT | White (yellow card) 60'; Kemp 68'; King (yellow card) 86' | Report | Andrews 26'; Gbode (yellow card) 48' | Stadium: Broadhall Way; Attendance: 832; Referee: Scott Simpson |
| | Penalties |
| | Simpson (penalty missed); Aboh (penalty scored); Kemp (penalty scored); White (penalty scored); King (penalty scored) | | (penalty scored) Clark; (penalty scored) Williams; (penalty scored) Nolan; (penalty scored) Sargent; (penalty scored) Wyllie |

== Statistics ==
=== Appearances and goals ===
As of match played 3 May 2025

Players with no appearances are not included on the list
Italics indicate a loaned in player

| No. | Pos | Nat | Player | Total | | League Two | | FA Cup | | EFL Cup | | EFL Trophy | |
| No. | Pos | Nat | Player | Apps | Goals | Apps | Goals | Apps | Goals | Apps | Goals | Apps | Goals |
|---|---|---|---|---|---|---|---|---|---|---|---|---|---|
| 1 | GK | (England) ENG | Glenn Morris | 38 | 0 | 35+1 | 0 | 1+0 | 0 | 1+0 | 0 | 0+0 | 0 |
| 2 | MF | (England) ENG | Remeao Hutton | 47 | 1 | 40+4 | 1 | 1+0 | 0 | 0+0 | 0 | 2+0 | 0 |
| 3 | DF | (England) ENG | Max Clark | 43 | 3 | 39+1 | 3 | 0+0 | 0 | 1+0 | 0 | 2+0 | 0 |
| 4 | DF | (Republic of Ireland) IRL | Conor Masterson | 26 | 1 | 24+0 | 1 | 1+0 | 0 | 0+0 | 0 | 1+0 | 0 |
| 5 | DF | (Germany) GER | Max Ehmer | 39 | 0 | 33+2 | 0 | 1+0 | 0 | 1+0 | 0 | 1+1 | 0 |
| 6 | MF | (England) ENG | Ethan Coleman | 23 | 0 | 16+5 | 0 | 0+0 | 0 | 0+0 | 0 | 2+0 | 0 |
| 7 | FW | (England) ENG | Jack Nolan | 36 | 1 | 20+11 | 1 | 1+0 | 0 | 1+0 | 0 | 2+1 | 0 |
| 8 | MF | (England) ENG | Armani Little | 36 | 2 | 30+3 | 2 | 1+0 | 0 | 0+0 | 0 | 1+1 | 0 |
| 9 | FW | (England) ENG | Josh Andrews | 15 | 1 | 2+10 | 0 | 0+1 | 0 | 0+0 | 0 | 2+0 | 1 |
| 10 | MF | (Wales) WAL | Jonny Williams | 30 | 1 | 8+18 | 1 | 0+0 | 0 | 1+0 | 0 | 3+0 | 0 |
| 11 | MF | (England) ENG | Aaron Rowe | 17 | 1 | 10+6 | 1 | 0+0 | 0 | 0+1 | 0 | 0+0 | 0 |
| 12 | FW | (England) ENG | Oliver Hawkins | 27 | 1 | 10+15 | 0 | 0+0 | 0 | 0+1 | 1 | 1+0 | 0 |
| 14 | DF | (England) ENG | Robbie McKenzie | 40 | 6 | 37+2 | 6 | 0+0 | 0 | 1+0 | 0 | 0+0 | 0 |
| 15 | DF | (England) ENG | Andy Smith | 12 | 0 | 12+0 | 0 | 0+0 | 0 | 0+0 | 0 | 0+0 | 0 |
| 16 | MF | (Malawi) MAW | Nelson Khumbeni | 10 | 0 | 4+6 | 0 | 0+0 | 0 | 0+0 | 0 | 0+0 | 0 |
| 17 | MF | (England) ENG | Jayden Clarke | 38 | 7 | 21+12 | 7 | 1+0 | 0 | 1+0 | 0 | 2+1 | 0 |
| 18 | FW | (England) ENG | Marcus Wyllie | 16 | 1 | 8+4 | 0 | 0+1 | 0 | 0+1 | 0 | 1+1 | 1 |
| 19 | FW | (England) ENG | Jimmy-Jay Morgan | 16 | 2 | 10+6 | 2 | 0+0 | 0 | 0+0 | 0 | 0+0 | 0 |
| 20 | FW | (England) ENG | Elliott Nevitt | 37 | 5 | 31+5 | 4 | 0+0 | 0 | 0+0 | 0 | 0+1 | 1 |
| 21 | MF | (England) ENG | Euan Williams | 13 | 0 | 5+5 | 0 | 1+0 | 0 | 1+0 | 0 | 1+0 | 0 |
| 22 | DF | (Republic of Ireland) IRL | Shadrach Ogie | 39 | 0 | 26+8 | 0 | 1+0 | 0 | 1+0 | 0 | 1+2 | 0 |
| 23 | MF | (England) ENG | Bradley Dack | 20 | 1 | 5+14 | 1 | 0+0 | 0 | 0+0 | 0 | 1+0 | 0 |
| 24 | FW | (England) ENG | Jacob Wakeling | 19 | 1 | 6+10 | 1 | 1+0 | 0 | 0+1 | 0 | 1+0 | 0 |
| 25 | GK | (England) ENG | Jake Turner | 9 | 0 | 9+0 | 0 | 0+0 | 0 | 0+0 | 0 | 0+0 | 0 |
| 28 | FW | (England) ENG | Asher Agbinone | 6 | 0 | 5+1 | 0 | 0+0 | 0 | 0+0 | 0 | 0+0 | 0 |
| 29 | FW | (England) ENG | Joseph Gbode | 39 | 3 | 19+15 | 3 | 0+1 | 0 | 1+0 | 0 | 2+1 | 0 |
| 30 | DF | (England) ENG | Sam Gale | 22 | 0 | 22+0 | 0 | 0+0 | 0 | 0+0 | 0 | 0+0 | 0 |
| 31 | DF | (England) ENG | Alex Giles | 3 | 0 | 0+0 | 0 | 0+0 | 0 | 1+0 | 0 | 2+0 | 0 |
| 33 | GK | (England) ENG | Taite Holtam | 2 | 0 | 2+0 | 0 | 0+0 | 0 | 0+0 | 0 | 0+0 | 0 |
| 34 | MF | (England) ENG | Stanley Skipper | 1 | 0 | 0+0 | 0 | 0+0 | 0 | 0+0 | 0 | 0+1 | 0 |
| 36 | MF | (England) ENG | Dominic Corness | 6 | 0 | 4+2 | 0 | 0+0 | 0 | 0+0 | 0 | 0+0 | 0 |
| 38 | MF | (France) FRA | Timothée Dieng | 14 | 3 | 8+5 | 3 | 1+0 | 0 | 0+0 | 0 | 0+0 | 0 |
| 40 | DF | (England) ENG | Harry Webster | 4 | 0 | 2+0 | 0 | 0+0 | 0 | 0+0 | 0 | 2+0 | 0 |
| 42 | MF | (England) ENG | Harry Waldock | 1 | 0 | 0+0 | 0 | 0+0 | 0 | 0+0 | 0 | 0+1 | 0 |
| 43 | FW | (England) ENG | Stan Sargent | 1 | 0 | 0+0 | 0 | 0+0 | 0 | 0+0 | 0 | 0+1 | 0 |
Player(s) who featured whilst on loan but returned to parent club during the season:
| 13 | GK | (England) ENG | Luca Ashby-Hammond | 4 | 0 | 0+1 | 0 | 0+0 | 0 | 0+0 | 0 | 3+0 | 0 |
Player(s) who featured but departed the club permanently during the season:
| 32 | MF | (England) ENG | George Lapslie | 17 | 2 | 8+7 | 2 | 0+0 | 0 | 0+1 | 0 | 0+1 | 0 |
