= 2024–25 Crystal Palace F.C. season =

English football club season

Crystal Palace
2024–25 season
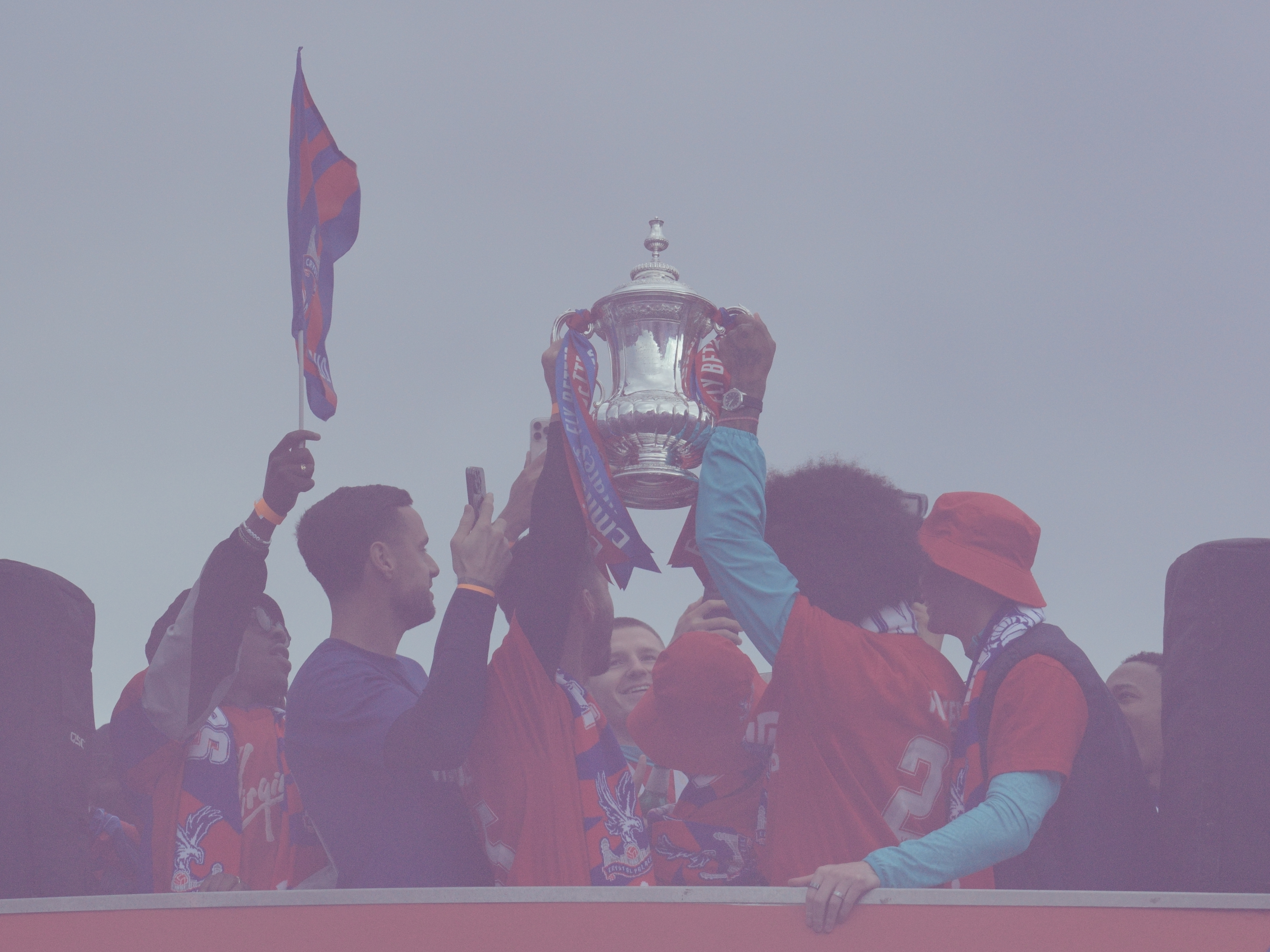
- Crystal Palace players during the FA Cup victory parade
- Owners: John Textor (45%); Josh Harris (18%); David Blitzer (18%); Steve Parish (10%)
- Chairman: Steve Parish
- Manager: Oliver Glasner
- Stadium: Selhurst Park
- Premier League: 12th
- FA Cup: Winners
- EFL Cup: Quarter-finals
- Top goalscorer: League: Jean-Philippe Mateta (14); All: Jean-Philippe Mateta (17)
- Average home league attendance: 25,064
- Biggest win: 4–0 v Norwich City (H) (27 August 2024, EFL Cup)
- Biggest defeat: 0–5 v Newcastle United (A) (16 April 2025, Premier League)
Home colours	Away colours	Third colours

The 2024–25 season was the 119th season in the history of Crystal Palace Football Club, and their twelfth consecutive season in the Premier League. In addition to the domestic league, the club also participated in the FA Cup and the EFL Cup.

Marc Guéhi was appointed club captain ahead of the season, replacing Joel Ward. This was the first season since 2015–16 not to feature James Tomkins, who departed the club in the summer of 2024 before retiring. Michael Olise also departed for Bayern Munich after three years for a club record sale of £50.8 million.

On 26 April 2025, Crystal Palace beat Aston Villa 3–0 in the FA Cup semi-finals to make the final for the third time in their history. They would go on to beat Manchester City 1–0 in the final on 17 May to win the FA Cup for the first time, which marked the Eagles' first ever major trophy and qualified them for the 2025 FA Community Shield as well as the play-off round of the 2025–26 UEFA Conference League, after they were demoted from 2025–26 UEFA Europa League league phase due to multi-club ownership with fellow participant Olympique Lyonnais. They also finished the season on 53 points, their highest ever in the Premier League.

== Squad ==
As of 4 February 2025

Note: Flags indicate national team as defined under FIFA eligibility rules; some limited exceptions apply. Players may hold more than one non-FIFA nationality.

No.	Pos.	Nation	Player
1	GK	ENG	Dean Henderson
2	DF	ENG	Joel Ward
3	DF	ENG	Tyrick Mitchell
5	DF	FRA	Maxence Lacroix
6	DF	ENG	Marc Guéhi (captain)
7	FW	SEN	Ismaïla Sarr
8	MF	COL	Jefferson Lerma
9	FW	ENG	Eddie Nketiah
10	MF	ENG	Eberechi Eze
11	MF	BRA	Matheus França
12	DF	COL	Daniel Muñoz
14	FW	FRA	Jean-Philippe Mateta
17	DF	ENG	Nathaniel Clyne

No.	Pos.	Nation	Player
18	MF	JPN	Daichi Kamada
19	MF	ENG	Will Hughes
20	MF	ENG	Adam Wharton
21	FW	ENG	Romain Esse
25	DF	ENG	Ben Chilwell (on loan from Chelsea)
26	DF	USA	Chris Richards
28	MF	MLI	Cheick Doucouré
30	GK	USA	Matt Turner (on loan from Nottingham Forest)
31	GK	ENG	Remi Matthews
34	DF	MAR	Chadi Riad
55	MF	NIR	Justin Devenny
58	DF	ENG	Caleb Kporha

== Transfers ==
=== In ===
Date	Pos.	Player	From	Fee	Ref.
14 June 2024	CB	(Morocco) Chadi Riad	(Spain) Real Betis	£14,000,000	
1 July 2024	AM	(Japan) Daichi Kamada	(Italy) Lazio	Free	
2 July 2024	CF	(England) Jemiah Umolu (Note: Signed initially for the Under-21s)	(England) West Ham United	Free	
1 August 2024	RW	(Senegal) Ismaïla Sarr	(France) Marseille	£12,500,000	
22 August 2024	GK	(England) Louie Moulden	(England) Wolverhampton Wanderers	Free	
23 August 2024	LB	(England) Kurai Musanhi	(England) Hertford Town	Free	
30 August 2024	CB	(France) Maxence Lacroix	(Germany) VfL Wolfsburg	£18,000,000	
30 August 2024	CF	(England) Eddie Nketiah	(England) Arsenal	£25,000,000	
18 January 2025	RW	(England) Romain Esse	(England) Millwall	£12,000,000	
7 March 2025	CF	(Australia) Rylan Brownlie	(Australia) Brisbane Roar	Free	

Total expenditure: ▼£81,500,000 (excluding add-ons, bonuses and undisclosed figures)

=== Out ===
Date	Pos.	Player	To	Fee	Ref.
7 July 2024	RW	(France) Michael Olise	(Germany) Bayern Munich	£50,800,000	
3 August 2024	CM	(England) Malachi Boateng	(Scotland) Heart of Midlothian	Undisclosed	
23 August 2024	CB	(Denmark) Joachim Andersen	(England) Fulham	£30,000,000	
23 August 2024	CF	(Ghana) Jordan Ayew	(England) Leicester City	£5,000,000	
30 August 2024	GK	(England) Sam Johnstone	(England) Wolverhampton Wanderers	£10,000,000	

Total income: ▲£95,800,000 (excluding add-ons, bonuses and undisclosed figures)

=== Loaned in ===
Date	Pos.	Player	From	Date until	Ref.
30 August 2024	CB	(England) Trevoh Chalobah	(England) Chelsea	15 January 2025 (Note: Despite the agreement having been until the end of the season, it was announced on 15 January that Chalobah had been recalled by Chelsea)	
30 August 2024	GK	(United States) Matt Turner	(England) Nottingham Forest	End of season	
3 February 2025	LB	(England) Ben Chilwell	(England) Chelsea	End of season	

=== Loaned out ===
Date	Pos.	Player	To	Date until	Ref.
16 July 2024	GK	(England) Owen Goodman	(England) AFC Wimbledon	End of season	
16 July 2024	GK	(England) Joe Whitworth	(England) Exeter City	End of season	
24 July 2024	DM	(England) David Ozoh	(England) Derby County	End of season	
26 July 2024	LB	(Republic of Ireland) Tayo Adaramola	(England) Stockport County	20 January 2025 (Note: On 20 January, Adaramola was recalled from his loan at Stockport)	
26 July 2024	RB	(England) Danny Imray	(England) Bromley	End of season	
2 August 2024	RW	(England) Malcolm Ebiowei	(England) Oxford United	3 January 2025 (Note: On 3 January, Ebiowei was recalled from his loan at Oxford)	
6 August 2024	CF	(England) Ademola Ola-Adebomi	(Belgium) Beveren	End of season	
16 August 2024	RW	(England) Jesurun Rak-Sakyi	(England) Sheffield United	End of season	
21 August 2024	CM	(Republic of Ireland) Killian Phillips	(Scotland) St Mirren	End of season	
30 August 2024	CM	(France) Naouirou Ahamada	(France) Rennes	End of season	
30 August 2024	CF	(France) Odsonne Édouard	(England) Leicester City	End of season	
30 August 2024	CM	(England) Jack Wells-Morrison	(England) Wealdstone	1 January 2025	
4 September 2024	RW	(England) Roshaun Mathurin	(England) Hartlepool United	1 January 2025	
7 January 2025	CB	(England) Chris Francis	(England) Dagenham & Redbridge	End of season	
10 January 2025	LW	(England) Asher Agbinone	(England) Gillingham	End of season	
10 January 2025	CF	(England) Jemiah Umolu	(England) Port Vale	End of season	
1 February 2025	CF	(England) Luke Plange	(Scotland) Motherwell	End of season	
3 February 2025	LB	(Republic of Ireland) Tayo Adaramola	(England) Bradford City	End of season	
3 February 2025	CB	(England) Rob Holding	(England) Sheffield United	End of season	
3 February 2025	AM	(Wales) Jadan Raymond	(Scotland) Queen's Park	End of season	
3 February 2025	LM	(Ghana) Jeffrey Schlupp	(Scotland) Celtic	End of season	
4 February 2025	CM	(England) Jack Wells-Morrison	(England) Solihull Moors	End of season	
21 February 2025	CB	(Republic of Ireland) Seán Grehan	(Republic of Ireland) Bohemian	End of season	

=== Released ===
Date	Pos.	Player	Subsequent club	Join date	Ref.
30 June 2024	CB	(Northern Ireland) Kofi Balmer	(Scotland) Motherwell	1 July 2024	
30 June 2024	RW	(Scotland) Scott Banks	(Germany) FC St. Pauli	1 July 2024	
30 June 2024	CF	(England) John-Kymani Gordon	(England) Colchester United	1 July 2024	
30 June 2024	DM	(Netherlands) Jaïro Riedewald	(Belgium) Antwerp	13 August 2024	
30 June 2024	LB	(England) Vonnte Williams	(England) Brentford	26 August 2024	
30 June 2024	LB	(Nigeria) Kelvin Agho			
30 June 2024	CB	(England) Nathan Ferguson			
30 June 2024	DM	(England) Giulio Marroni			
30 June 2024	CB	(England) James Tomkins	Retired		
30 June 2024	CB	(England) Noah Watson			

== Pre-season and friendlies ==
On 9 May, Palace announced they would return to the United States, as part of the inaugural Stateside Cup pre-season tournament, against Wolverhampton Wanderers and West Ham United. A third friendly was later confirmed, away to Crawley Town. On 28 June, a home friendly against Nantes was announced. A behind closed doors friendly against Charlton Athletic was also later added.

Win Draw Loss Fixtures

19 July 2024 Friendly	Crystal Palace	1–1	Charlton Athletic	Beckenham
12:00 BST	Rak-Sakyi 90'	Report	Aneke 38'	Stadium: Crystal Palace Training Ground; Attendance: 0 (behind-closed-doors)

27 July 2024 Friendly	Crawley Town	3–6	Crystal Palace	Crawley
12:30 BST	Hepburn-Murphy 50', 60'; Roles 72'	Report	Édouard 2'; Rak-Sakyi 3', 27'; Kamada 11'; Ayew 65'; Schlupp 87'	Stadium: Broadfield Stadium

31 July 2024 Stateside Cup	Crystal Palace	3–1	Wolverhampton Wanderers	Annapolis, United States
20:00 EDT (01:00 BST)	Schlupp 35'; Ayew 50'; Agbinone 90+4'	Report	S. Bueno 90'	Stadium: Navy–Marine Corps Memorial Stadium

3 August 2024 Stateside Cup	Crystal Palace	3–1	West Ham United	Tampa, United States
19:00 EDT (00:00 BST)	Mitchell 1'; Schlupp 66'; Édouard 69'	Report	Antonio 21'	Stadium: Raymond James Stadium; Referee: Rosendo Mendoza

11 August 2024 Friendly	Crystal Palace	1–1	Nantes	Selhurst
15:00 BST	Kamada 60'	Report	Castelletto 18'	Stadium: Selhurst Park

13 March 2025 Friendly	HamKam	0–1	Crystal Palace	Marbella, Spain
16:00 CET (15:00 GMT)		Report	França 59'	Stadium: Marbella Football Center; Attendance: 0 (behind-closed-doors)

== Competitions ==
=== Overall record ===
Competition	First match	Last match	Starting round	Final position	Record							
Competition	First match	Last match	Starting round	Final position	Pld	W	D	L	GF	GA	GD	Win %
Premier League	18 August 2024	25 May 2025	Matchday 1	12th	38	13	14	11	51	51	+0	34.21
FA Cup	12 January 2025	17 May 2025	Third round	Winners	6	6	0	0	13	1	+12	100.00
EFL Cup	27 August 2024	18 December 2024	Second round	Quarter-finals	4	3	0	1	10	5	+5	75.00
Total					48	22	14	12	74	57	+17	45.83

Source: Soccerway

=== Premier League ===
==== League table ====
Pos	Team	Pld	W	D	L	GF	GA	GD	Pts	Qualification or relegation
10	Brentford	38	16	8	14	66	57	+9	56	
11	Fulham	38	15	9	14	54	54	0	54	
12	Crystal Palace	38	13	14	11	51	51	0	53	Qualification for the Conference League play-off round (Note: Since the winners of the 2024–25 EFL Cup, Newcastle United, qualified for the Champions League via league position, the spot reserved for the EFL Cup winners (Conference League play-off round) was initially passed to the 7th-placed team (Nottingham Forest). However due to multi-club ownership rules, the winners of the FA Cup, Crystal Palace, were not permitted to enter the Europa League and entered the Conference League play-off round instead, with Nottingham Forest taking their place in the Europa League. Crystal Palace appealed the decision but this was ultimately rejected.)
13	Everton	38	11	15	12	42	44	−2	48	
14	West Ham United	38	11	10	17	46	62	−16	43	

Source: Premier League
Rules for classification: 1) Points; 2) Goal difference; 3) Goals scored; 4) If the champions, relegated teams or qualified teams for UEFA competitions cannot be determined by rules 1 to 3, rules 4.1 to 4.3 are applied – 4.1) Points gained in head-to-head record between such teams; 4.2) Away goals scored in head-to-head record between such teams; 4.3) Play-offs

==== Results summary ====
Overall								Home						Away					
Pld	W	D	L	GF	GA	GD	Pts	W	D	L	GF	GA	GD	W	D	L	GF	GA	GD
38	13	14	11	51	51	0	53	6	7	6	24	26	−2	7	7	5	27	25	+2

Source: Soccerway

==== Results by round ====
Round	1	2	3	4	5	6	7	8	9	10	11	12	13	14	15	16	17	18	19	20	21	22	23	24	25	26	27	28	30	31	32	29^{1}	33	34	35	36	37	38
Ground	A	H	A	H	H	A	H	A	H	A	H	A	H	A	H	A	H	A	H	H	A	A	H	A	H	A	H	H	A	H	A	A	H	A	H	A	H	A
Result	L	L	D	D	D	L	L	L	W	D	L	D	D	W	D	W	L	D	W	D	W	W	L	W	L	W	W	W	D	W	L	L	D	D	D	W	W	D
Position	13	17	16	16	16	18	18	18	17	17	18	19	17	17	17	15	16	16	15	15	15	12	13	12	13	13	12	11	12	11	12	12	12	12	12	12	12	12
Points	0	0	1	2	3	3	3	3	6	7	7	8	9	12	13	16	16	17	20	21	24	27	27	30	30	33	36	39	40	43	43	43	44	45	46	49	52	53

Source: Premier League
A = Away; H = Home; W = Win; D = Draw; L = Loss; P = Postponed
Notes:
- ^{1} Matchday 29 (v Newcastle United) was postponed due to Newcastle's EFL Cup final involvement.

==== Matches ====
The Premier League fixtures were released on 18 June 2024.

Win Draw Loss Fixtures

18 August 2024 1	Brentford	2–1	Crystal Palace	Brentford
14:00 BST	Wissa 76'; Mbeumo 29'	Report	Pinnock 56' (o.g.)	Stadium: Brentford Community Stadium; Attendance: 16,988; Referee: Sam Barrott

24 August 2024 2	Crystal Palace	0–2	West Ham United	Selhurst
15:00 BST		Report	Souček 67'; Bowen 72'	Stadium: Selhurst Park; Attendance: 25,099; Referee: Robert Jones

1 September 2024 3	Chelsea	1–1	Crystal Palace	Fulham
13:30 BST	Jackson 25'	Report	Eze 53'	Stadium: Stamford Bridge; Attendance: 39,298; Referee: Jarred Gillett
Note: Fixture was initially scheduled for 31 August, but was moved due to Chelsea's UEFA Conference League involvement.

14 September 2024 4	Crystal Palace	2–2	Leicester City	Selhurst
15:00 BST	Mateta 47', 90+2' (pen.)	Report	Vardy 21'; Mavididi 46'	Stadium: Selhurst Park; Attendance: 25,124; Referee: Tony Harrington

21 September 2024 5	Crystal Palace	0–0	Manchester United	Selhurst
17:30 BST		Report		Stadium: Selhurst Park; Attendance: 25,172; Referee: David Coote
Note: Fixture was initially scheduled for a 15:00 kick-off, but was moved for live Sky Sports broadcast.

28 September 2024 6	Everton	2–1	Crystal Palace	Liverpool
15:00 BST	McNeil 47', 54'	Report	Guéhi 10'	Stadium: Goodison Park; Attendance: 38,954; Referee: Andrew Madley

5 October 2024 7	Crystal Palace	0–1	Liverpool	Selhurst
12:30 BST		Report	Jota 9'	Stadium: Selhurst Park; Attendance: 25,185; Referee: Simon Hooper
Note: Fixture was initially scheduled for a 15:00 kick-off, but was moved for live TNT Sports broadcast.

21 October 2024 8	Nottingham Forest	1–0	Crystal Palace	West Bridgford
20:00 BST	Wood 65'	Report		Stadium: City Ground; Attendance: 29,443; Referee: Tim Robinson
Note: Fixture was initially scheduled for 19 October, but was moved for live Sky Sports broadcast.

27 October 2024 9	Crystal Palace	1–0	Tottenham Hotspur	Selhurst
14:00 BST	Mateta 31'	Report		Stadium: Selhurst Park; Attendance: 25,108; Referee: Darren Bond
Note: Fixture was initially scheduled for 26 October, but was moved due to Tottenham's UEFA Europa League involvement on the Thursday prior.

2 November 2024 10	Wolverhampton Wanderers	2–2	Crystal Palace	Wolverhampton
17:30 BST	Larsen 67'; João Gomes 72'	Report	Chalobah 60'; Guéhi 77'	Stadium: Molineux Stadium; Attendance: 29,505; Referee: Anthony Taylor
Note: Fixture was initially scheduled for a 15:00 kick-off, but was moved for live Sky Sports broadcast.

9 November 2024 11	Crystal Palace	0–2	Fulham	Selhurst
15:00 GMT	Kamada (red card) 76'	Report	Smith Rowe 45+2'; Wilson 83'	Stadium: Selhurst Park; Attendance: 25,142; Referee: Michael Salisbury

23 November 2024 12	Aston Villa	2–2	Crystal Palace	Birmingham
15:00 GMT	Watkins 36'; Tielemans (penalty missed) 45'; Barkley 77'	Report	Sarr 4'; Devenny 45+1'	Stadium: Villa Park; Attendance: 42,175; Referee: Tim Robinson

30 November 2024 13	Crystal Palace	1–1	Newcastle United	Selhurst
15:00 GMT	Muñoz 90+4'	Report	Guéhi 53' (o.g.)	Stadium: Selhurst Park; Attendance: 25,101; Referee: Darren England

3 December 2024 14	Ipswich Town	0–1	Crystal Palace	Ipswich
19:30 GMT		Report	Mateta 59'	Stadium: Portman Road; Attendance: 29,533; Referee: Craig Pawson

7 December 2024 15	Crystal Palace	2–2	Manchester City	Selhurst
15:00 GMT	Muñoz 4'; Lacroix 56'	Report	Haaland 30'; Lewis 68', (yellow card) 70' (yellow-red card) 84'	Stadium: Selhurst Park; Attendance: 25,142; Referee: Robert Jones

15 December 2024 16	Brighton & Hove Albion	1–3	Crystal Palace	Brighton and Hove
14:00 GMT	Guéhi 87' (o.g.)	Report	Chalobah 27'; Sarr 33', 82'	Stadium: Falmer Stadium; Attendance: 30,893; Referee: Michael Oliver
Note: Fixture was initially scheduled for 14 December, but was moved for live Sky Sports broadcast. On 31 October, the fixture date was moved again due to EFL Cup involvements.

21 December 2024 17	Crystal Palace	1–5	Arsenal	Selhurst
17:30 GMT	Sarr 11'	Report	Gabriel Jesus 6', 14'; Havertz 38'; Martinelli 60'; Rice 84'	Stadium: Selhurst Park; Attendance: 25,167; Referee: Simon Hooper
Note: Fixture was initially scheduled for a 15:00 kick-off, but was moved for live Sky Sports broadcast.

26 December 2024 18	Bournemouth	0–0	Crystal Palace	Bournemouth
15:00 GMT		Report		Stadium: Vitality Stadium; Attendance: 11,129; Referee: Thomas Bramall

29 December 2024 19	Crystal Palace	2–1	Southampton	Selhurst
15:00 GMT	Chalobah 31'; Eze 52'	Report	Dibling 14'	Stadium: Selhurst Park; Attendance: 25,130; Referee: Michael Salisbury

4 January 2025 20	Crystal Palace	1–1	Chelsea	Selhurst
15:00 GMT	Mateta 82'	Report	Palmer 14'	Stadium: Selhurst Park; Attendance: 25,179; Referee: Tim Robinson

15 January 2025 21	Leicester City	0–2	Crystal Palace	Leicester
19:30 GMT		Report	Mateta 52'; Guéhi 78'	Stadium: King Power Stadium; Attendance: 29,766; Referee: Andrew Madley
Note: Fixture was initially scheduled for 14 January, but was moved for live TNT Sports broadcast.

18 January 2025 22	West Ham United	0–2	Crystal Palace	Stratford
15:00 BST	Mavropanos (yellow card) 46' (yellow-red card) 80'	Report	Mateta 48', 89' (pen.)	Stadium: London Stadium; Attendance: 62,469; Referee: Thomas Bramall

26 January 2025 23	Crystal Palace	1–2	Brentford	Selhurst
14:00 GMT	Esse 85'	Report	Mbeumo 66' (pen.); Schade 80'	Stadium: Selhurst Park; Attendance: 25,066; Referee: Tony Harrington
Note: Fixture was initially scheduled for 25 January, but was moved for live Sky Sports broadcast.

2 February 2025 24	Manchester United	0–2	Crystal Palace	Trafford
14:00 GMT		Report	Mateta 64', 89'	Stadium: Old Trafford; Attendance: 73,751; Referee: John Brooks
Note: Fixture was initially scheduled for 1 February, but was moved due to Manchester United's UEFA Europa League involvement on the preceding Thursday.

15 February 2025 25	Crystal Palace	1–2	Everton	Selhurst
17:30 GMT	Mateta 47'	Report	Beto 42'; Alcaraz 80'	Stadium: Selhurst Park; Attendance: 25,108; Referee: Anthony Taylor
Note: Fixture was initially scheduled for a 15:00 kick-off, but was moved for live Sky Sports broadcast.

22 February 2025 26	Fulham	0–2	Crystal Palace	Fulham
15:00 GMT		Report	Andersen 37' (o.g.); Muñoz 66'	Stadium: Craven Cottage; Attendance: 26,777; Referee: Robert Jones

25 February 2025 27	Crystal Palace	4–1	Aston Villa	Selhurst
19:30 GMT	Sarr 29', 71'; Mateta 59'; Nketiah 90+1'	Report	Rogers 52'	Stadium: Selhurst Park; Attendance: 24,712; Referee: Sam Barrott
Note: Fixture was initially scheduled for a 20:00 kick-off, but was moved for live TNT Sports broadcast.

8 March 2025 28	Crystal Palace	1–0	Ipswich Town	Selhurst
15:00 GMT	Sarr 82'	Report		Stadium: Selhurst Park; Attendance: 25,155; Referee: Simon Hooper

2 April 2025 30	Southampton	1–1	Crystal Palace	Southampton
19:45 BST	Onuachu 20'	Report	França 90+2'	Stadium: St Mary's Stadium; Attendance: 29,366; Referee: Andrew Madley

5 April 2025 31	Crystal Palace	2–1	Brighton & Hove Albion	Selhurst
15:00 BST	Mateta 3'; Muñoz 55'; Guéhi (yellow card) 57' (yellow-red card) 90'; Nketiah (yellow card) 69' (yellow-red card) 78'	Report	Van Hecke (yellow card) 25' (yellow-red card) 90+6'; Welbeck 31'	Stadium: Selhurst Park; Attendance: 24,564; Referee: Anthony Taylor

12 April 2025 32	Manchester City	5–2	Crystal Palace	Manchester
12:30 BST	De Bruyne 33'; Marmoush 36'; Kovačić 47'; McAtee 56'; O'Reilly 79'	Report	Eze 8'; Richards 21'	Stadium: City of Manchester Stadium; Attendance: 52,489; Referee: Jarred Gillett
Note: Fixture was initially scheduled for a 15:00 kick-off, but was moved for live TNT Sports broadcast.

16 April 2025 29	Newcastle United	5–0	Crystal Palace	Newcastle upon Tyne
19:30 BST	Murphy 14'; Guéhi 38' (o.g.); Barnes 45+2'; Schär 45+8'; Isak 58'	Report	Eze (penalty missed) 36'	Stadium: St James' Park; Attendance: 52,197; Referee: Darren England
Note: Fixture was initially scheduled for 15 March, but was postponed due to Newcastle's involvement in the EFL Cup final.

19 April 2025 33	Crystal Palace	0–0	Bournemouth	Selhurst
15:00 BST	Richards (yellow card) 29' (yellow-red card) 45+1'	Report		Stadium: Selhurst Park; Attendance: 25,185; Referee: Sam Barrott

23 April 2025 34	Arsenal	2–2	Crystal Palace	Holloway
20:00 BST	Kiwior 3'; Trossard 42'	Report	Eze 27'; Mateta 83'	Stadium: Emirates Stadium; Attendance: 60,167; Referee: Michael Salisbury
Note: Fixture was initially scheduled for a 15:00 kick-off on 26 April, but was moved for live Sky Sports broadcast, and later moved forward due to Crystal Palace's involvement in the FA Cup semi-finals.

5 May 2025 35	Crystal Palace	1–1	Nottingham Forest	Selhurst
20:00 BST	Eze 60' (pen.)	Report	Murillo 64'	Stadium: Selhurst Park; Attendance: 25,096; Referee: Andrew Madley
Note: Fixture was initially scheduled for 3 May, but was moved for live Sky Sports broadcast.

11 May 2025 36	Tottenham Hotspur	0–2	Crystal Palace	Tottenham
14:15 BST		Report	Eze 45', 48'	Stadium: Tottenham Hotspur Stadium; Attendance: 60,254; Referee: Chris Kavanagh
Note: Fixture was initially scheduled for 10 May, but was moved due to Tottenham's UEFA Europa League involvement on the preceding Thursday.

20 May 2025 37	Crystal Palace	4–2	Wolverhampton Wanderers	Selhurst
20:00 BST	Nketiah 27', 32'; Chilwell 50'; Eze 86'	Report	Agbadou 24'; Larsen 62'	Stadium: Selhurst Park; Attendance: 24,766; Referee: David Webb
Note: Fixture was initially scheduled for 18 May, but was postponed due to Crystal Palace's involvement in the FA Cup final.

25 May 2025 38	Liverpool	1–1	Crystal Palace	Liverpool
16:00 BST	Gravenberch (yellow card) 61' (red card) 68'; Salah 84'	Report	Sarr 9'	Stadium: Anfield; Attendance: 60,382; Referee: Darren England

=== FA Cup ===
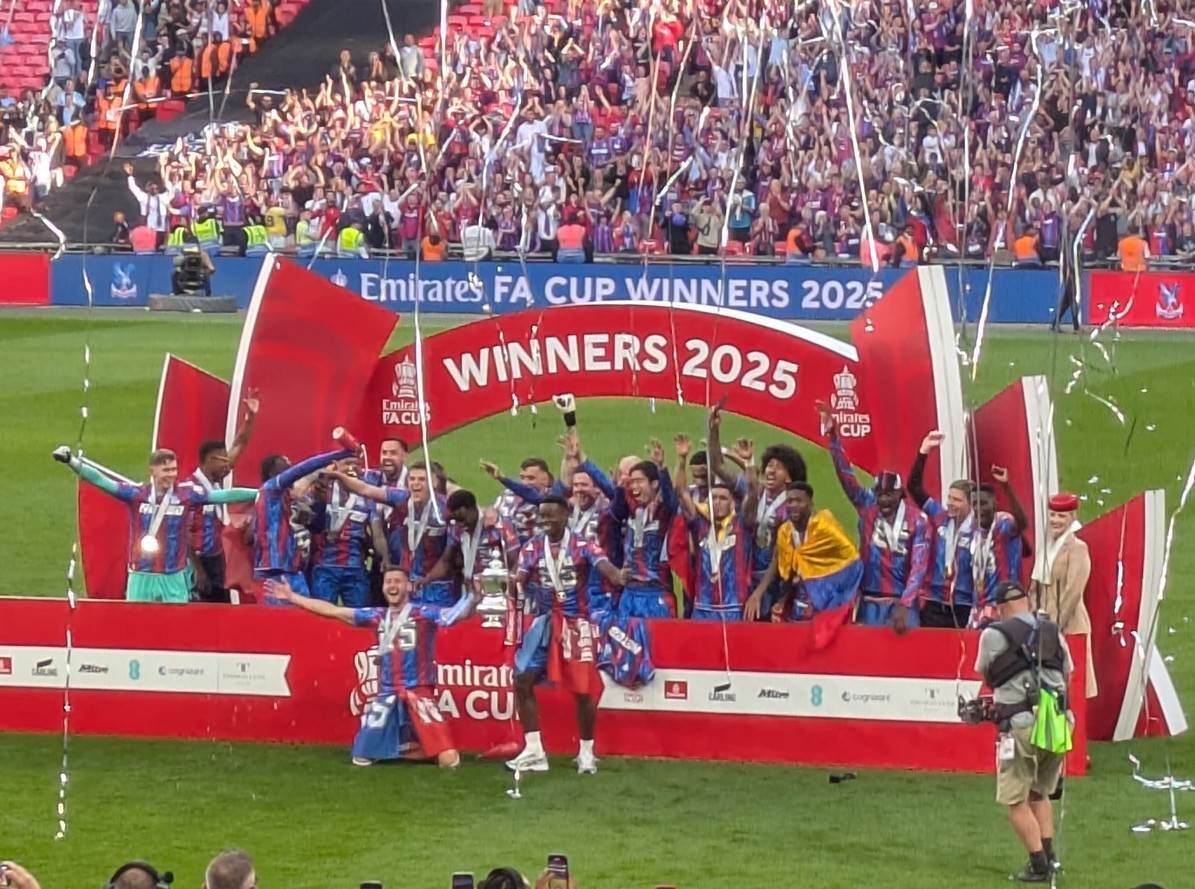
Palace celebrate after being presented with the FA Cup

Crystal Palace won the FA Cup, defeating fellow Premier League team Manchester City in the final, 1–0, with a goal from Eberechi Eze.

As a Premier League club, Palace entered the FA Cup in the third round, and were drawn at home to League One side Stockport County. They were then drawn away against League Two club Doncaster Rovers in the fourth round, at home to Championship side Millwall in the fifth round and away to Premier League side Fulham in the quarter-finals. In the semi-finals, they were drawn against Premier League club Aston Villa.

Win Draw Loss Fixtures

12 January 2025 Third round	Crystal Palace	1–0	Stockport County	Selhurst
15:00 GMT	Eze 4'	Report		Stadium: Selhurst Park; Attendance: 21,104; Referee: Stuart Attwell

10 February 2025 Fourth round	Doncaster Rovers	0–2	Crystal Palace	Doncaster
19:45 GMT		Report	Muñoz 31'; Devenny 55'	Stadium: Eco-Power Stadium; Attendance: 12,739; Referee: Farai Hallam

1 March 2025 Fifth round	Crystal Palace	3–1	Millwall	Selhurst
12:15 GMT	Tanganga 33' (o.g.); Muñoz 40'; Nketiah 81'	Report	Roberts (red card) 8'; Harding 45+13'	Stadium: Selhurst Park; Attendance: 21,263; Referee: Michael Oliver

29 March 2025 Quarter-finals	Fulham	0–3	Crystal Palace	Fulham
12:15 GMT		Report	Eze 34'; Sarr 38'; Nketiah 75'	Stadium: Craven Cottage; Attendance: 26,222; Referee: Darren England

26 April 2025 Semi-finals	Crystal Palace	3–0	Aston Villa	Wembley
17:15 BST	Eze 31'; Mateta (penalty missed) 53'; Sarr 58', 90+4'	Report		Stadium: Wembley Stadium; Attendance: 82,301; Referee: Anthony Taylor

17 May 2025 Final	Crystal Palace	1–0	Manchester City	Wembley
16:30 BST	Eze 16'	Report	Marmoush (penalty missed) 36'	Stadium: Wembley Stadium; Attendance: 84,163; Referee: Stuart Attwell

=== EFL Cup ===
As a Premier League club not competing in European competitions, Palace entered the EFL Cup in the second round, and were drawn at home to EFL Championship side Norwich City. They were then drawn away to Queens Park Rangers in the third round, away to Aston Villa in the fourth round, and away to Arsenal in the quarter-finals.

Win Draw Loss Fixtures

27 August 2024 Second round	Crystal Palace	4–0	Norwich City	Selhurst
20:00 BST	Kamada 2'; Mateta 57', 68'; Sarr 84'	Report		Stadium: Selhurst Park; Attendance: 12,503; Referee: Matt Donohue

17 September 2024 Third round	Queens Park Rangers	1–2	Crystal Palace	Shepherd's Bush
19:45 BST	Field 53'	Report	Nketiah 16'; Eze 64'	Stadium: Loftus Road; Attendance: 13,945; Referee: Sunny Singh Gill

30 October 2024 Fourth round	Aston Villa	1–2	Crystal Palace	Birmingham
19:45 BST	Durán 23'	Report	Eze 8'; Kamada 64'	Stadium: Villa Park; Attendance: 34,851; Referee: Sam Barrott

18 December 2024 Quarter-finals	Arsenal	3–2	Crystal Palace	Holloway
19:30 GMT	Gabriel Jesus 54', 73', 81'	Report	Mateta 4'; Nketiah 85'	Stadium: Emirates Stadium; Attendance: 59,298; Referee: Andrew Madley

== Statistics ==
=== Appearances and goals ===
Players with no appearances are not included on the list, Italics indicate a loaned in player

No.	Pos	Nat	Player	Total		Premier League		FA Cup		EFL Cup	
No.	Pos	Nat	Player	Apps	Goals	Apps	Goals	Apps	Goals	Apps	Goals
1	GK	(England) ENG	Dean Henderson	44	0	38	0	3	0	3	0
2	DF	(England) ENG	Joel Ward	3	0	1+1	0	0	0	0+1	0
3	DF	(England) ENG	Tyrick Mitchell	45	0	37	0	4	0	4	0
5	DF	(France) FRA	Maxence Lacroix	43	1	35	1	5	0	3	0
6	DF	(England) ENG	Marc Guéhi	44	3	34	3	6	0	4	0
7	FW	(Senegal) SEN	Ismaïla Sarr	47	12	30+8	8	5	3	1+3	1
8	MF	(Colombia) COL	Jefferson Lerma	42	0	26+7	0	3+3	0	2+1	0
9	FW	(England) ENG	Eddie Nketiah	37	7	9+20	3	1+4	2	2+1	2
10	MF	(England) ENG	Eberechi Eze	43	14	31+3	8	5	4	4	2
11	MF	(Brazil) BRA	Matheus França	7	1	0+4	1	0+3	0	0	0
12	DF	(Colombia) COL	Daniel Muñoz	46	6	37	4	6	2	3	0
14	FW	(France) FRA	Jean-Philippe Mateta	46	17	32+5	14	5	0	4	3
17	DF	(England) ENG	Nathaniel Clyne	19	0	5+8	0	1+2	0	1+2	0
18	MF	(Japan) JPN	Daichi Kamada	43	2	15+19	0	4+1	0	2+2	2
19	MF	(England) ENG	Will Hughes	41	0	24+9	0	2+2	0	3+1	0
20	MF	(England) ENG	Adam Wharton	27	0	16+4	0	4+1	0	1+1	0
21	MF	(England) ENG	Romain Esse	9	1	1+6	1	0+2	0	0	0
25	DF	(England) ENG	Ben Chilwell	11	1	1+7	1	1+2	0	0	0
26	DF	(United States) USA	Chris Richards	32	1	22+2	1	6	0	1+1	0
28	MF	(Mali) MLI	Cheick Doucouré	14	0	4+9	0	0	0	1	0
30	GK	(United States) USA	Matt Turner	4	0	0	0	3	0	1	0
34	DF	(Morocco) MAR	Chadi Riad	3	0	1	0	1	0	1	0
55	MF	(Northern Ireland) NIR	Justin Devenny	28	2	4+19	1	1+3	1	0+1	0
58	DF	(England) ENG	Caleb Kporha	4	0	0+2	0	0+1	0	1	0
64	FW	(England) ENG	Asher Agbinone	2	0	0+2	0	0	0	0	0
Player(s) who featured whilst on loan but returned to parent club during the season:
27	DF	(England) ENG	Trevoh Chalobah	14	3	12	3	0	0	2	0
Player(s) who featured but departed the club during the season:
5	DF	(Denmark) DEN	Joachim Andersen	1	0	1	0	0	0	0	0
9	FW	(Ghana) GHA	Jordan Ayew	1	0	0+1	0	0	0	0	0
15	MF	(Ghana) GHA	Jeffrey Schlupp	16	0	0+12	0	0+1	0	0+3	0
22	FW	(France) FRA	Odsonne Édouard	3	0	1+1	0	0	0	0+1	0
