= Asher Agbinone =

English footballer (born 2005)

Personal information
- Full name: Asher Chris Ofega Agbinone
- Date of birth: 28 September 2005 (age 21)
- Place of birth: Croydon, England
- Positions: Winger; forward

Youth career
- 2014–2024: Crystal Palace

Senior career*
Years	Team	Apps	(Gls)
2024–2026	Crystal Palace	2	(0)
2025	→ Gillingham (loan)	6	(0)
- * Club domestic league appearances and goals as of 3 May 2025 (UTC)

Asher Chris Ofega Agbinone (born 28 September 2005) is an English footballer who plays as a winger or forward. He most recently played for Premier League club Crystal Palace.

== Early life ==
Agbinone was born in Croydon on 28 September 2005. He is of Nigerian and Congolese ancestry. Agbinone joined the Crystal Palace Academy at the age of nine, going on to play for the Eagles at various age levels.

== Club career ==
Agbinone signed his first professional contract with Crystal Palace in 2022 while playing for the under-18 team. Shortly thereafter in March 2023, Agbinone was awarded with Crystal Palace's club goal of the month award for a long-distance effort he scored against the Tottenham Hotspur under-18s team. In the following season, Agbinone would go on to appear for Palace's under-18 and under-21 teams, including an appearance in the FA Youth Cup. Agbinone went on to score 9 goals in 20 youth team appearances in the 2023–24 season.

Agbinone earned a place in the Crystal Palace first team in the summer of 2024, as he was called up to join the senior squad for pre-season matches in the United States. During this tour, Agbinone scored his first senior pre-season goal in a 3–1 win over Wolverhampton Wanderers at Navy–Marine Corps Memorial Stadium in Annapolis, Maryland.

On 21 October 2024, Agbinone made his Premier League debut for the Eagles, coming on as a substitute in the second half of a 1–0 away loss against Nottingham Forest.

=== Gillingham (loan) ===
On 10 January 2025, Agbinone was loaned to EFL League Two team Gillingham for the remainder of the 2024–25 season.

== Career statistics ==
As of match played 3 May 2025

Appearances and goals by club, season and competition
Club	Season	League			FA Cup		EFL Cup		Other		Total	
Club	Season	Division	Apps	Goals	Apps	Goals	Apps	Goals	Apps	Goals	Apps	Goals
Crystal Palace	2024–25	Premier League	2	0	0	0	0	0	—		2	0
Gillingham (loan)	2024–25	EFL League Two	6	0	—		—		—		6	0
Career total			8	0	0	0	0	0	0	0	8	0
