= Dominic Corness =

English footballer (born 2003)

Personal information
- Full name: Dominic Corness
- Date of birth: 22 May 2003 (age 23)
- Place of birth: Liverpool, England
- Height: 5 ft 9 in (1.74 m)
- Position: Midfielder

Team information
- Current team: The New Saints
- Number: 4

Youth career
- –2023: Liverpool

Senior career*
Years	Team	Apps	(Gls)
2023–2025	Liverpool	0	(0)
2023–2024	→ Yverdon Sport (loan)	20	(0)
2025	→ Gillingham (loan)	4	(0)
2025–	The New Saints	45	(1)

International career
2023–	England U20	2	(0)
- * Club domestic league appearances and goals as of 05:50, 10 October 2026 (UTC)

Dominic Corness (born 5 May 2003) is an English professional footballer who plays as a midfielder for Cymru Premier club The New Saints. He is an England youth international.

== Club career ==
From Liverpool, Corness began playing for Liverpool age-group teams from five years-old. After working through the academy programme he signed his first professional contract in 2021. 18 months later in November 2022 he signed an updated deal with the club. He made his unofficial first team debut in a mid-season friendly against Olympique Lyonnais as part of the Dubai Super Cup, in December 2022.

Corness signed for Yverdon Sport of the Swiss Super League in July 2023 on a season-long loan. He made his league debut on 23 July 2023 away at FC Zürich.

Corness signed for Gillingham in EFL League Two in February 2025 for the remainder of the season. He left Liverpool at the end of the 2024-25 season.

After exiting Liverpool he joined agreed to join The New Saints from 1 July 2025. He made his competitive debut for the club the following week in the preliminary round of the UEFA Champions League in a 0-0 draw against Macedonian club KF Shkëndija. In his first season with the club, he played in each league match.

== International career ==
Corness made his debut for the England national under-20 football team in March 2023.

== Style of play ==
Corness has been nicknamed "the wand" due to his passing ability.

== Career statistics ==
=== Club ===
As of 25 August 2025

Appearances and goals by club, season and competition
Club	Season	League			National cup		League cup		Europe		Other		Total	
Club	Season	Division	Apps	Goals	Apps	Goals	Apps	Goals	Apps	Goals	Apps	Goals	Apps	Goals
Liverpool U23	2021–22	—			—		—		—		2 (Note: Appearance(s) in EFL Trophy)	0	2	0
Liverpool U23	2022–23	—			—		—		—		3	0	3	0
Liverpool U23	2024–25	—			—		—		—		3	1	3	1
Total					—		—		—		8	1	8	1
Yverdon-Sport	2023–24	Swiss Super League	20	0	0	0	0	0	0	0	0	0	20	0
Gillingham	2024–25	EFL League Two	4	0	0	0	0	0	—		0	0	4	0
The New Saints	2025–26	Cymru Premier	4	0	0	0	0	0	4 (Note: 2 appearance(s) in 2025–26 UEFA Champions League and 2 appearances in 2025–26 UEFA Europa Conference League)	0	0	0	8	0
Total			28	0	0	0	0	0	4	0	8	1	40	1
