= 2024–25 FA Cup =

English football tournament season

Football Association Challenge Cup
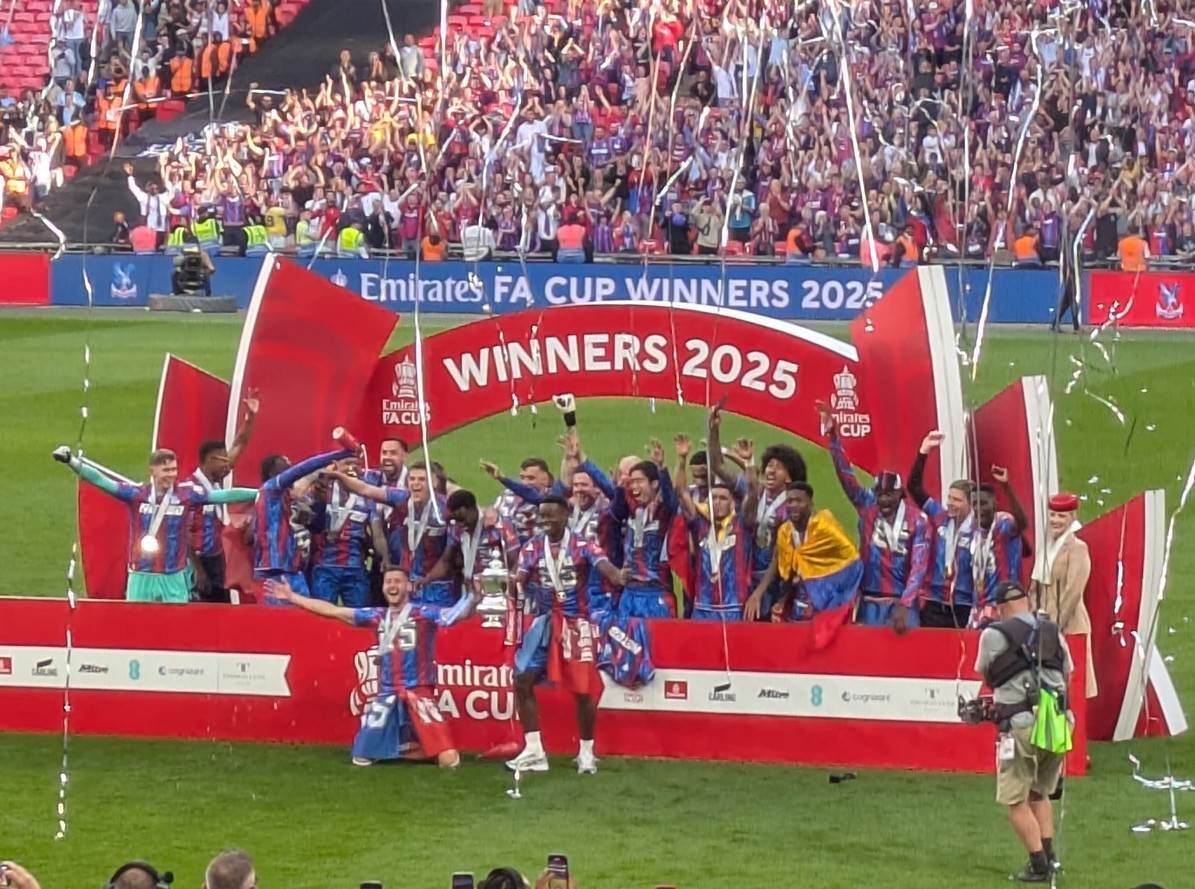
- Crystal Palace players celebrate their win, 17 May 2025

Tournament details
- Country: England; Wales
- Dates: 1 November 2024 – 17 May 2025
- Teams: 745; 653 (qualifying competition); 124 (main competition incl. 32 qualifiers)

Final positions
- Champions: Crystal Palace (1st title)
- Runners-up: Manchester City

Tournament statistics
- Matches played: 123
- Goals scored: 375 (3.05 per match)
- Attendance: 1,814,693 (14,754 per match)
- Top goal scorer(s): Josh Magennis (6 goals)
- (Note: All statistics do not include qualifying competition)

The 2024–25 FA Cup was the 144th season of the Football Association Challenge Cup, the oldest football tournament in the world. It was sponsored by Emirates and known as the Emirates FA Cup for sponsorship reasons. The FA Cup is the main domestic cup competition for men's football teams in England. The qualifying competition began on 3 August 2024, with the tournament proper starting on 2 November 2024.

The final was played at Wembley Stadium, London, on 17 May 2025. Crystal Palace won the tournament for the first time, defeating Manchester City in the final and winning their first ever major trophy. As the winners, Crystal Palace earned the right to play against the 2024–25 Premier League champions, Liverpool, in the 2025 FA Community Shield, as well as qualifying for the 2025–26 UEFA Conference League play-off round. For City, this was their third consecutive FA Cup final appearance, and second consecutive defeat.

Defending champions Manchester United, having beaten rivals Manchester City in the 2024 final to win their 13th title, were eliminated by Fulham in the fifth round.

== Teams ==
The FA Cup is a knockout competition with 124 teams taking part from the first round proper, and all trying to reach the final at Wembley Stadium on 17 May 2025. The competition consists of the 92 teams from the Football League system (20 teams from the Premier League and the 72 in total from the EFL Championship, EFL League One and EFL League Two) plus the 32 surviving teams out of 653 teams from the National League System that started the competition in the qualifying rounds. The total 745 entrants was an increase of 13 from the previous season, and the most since 758 entrants were accepted in 2012–13.

All rounds were drawn randomly, usually at the completion of the previous round (discounting any last games of a round being played), depending on television broadcasting rights.

Round	Main date (Saturdays)	Number of fixtures	Clubs remaining	New entries this round	Winner prize money	Loser prize money	Divisions entering this round
First round	2 November 2024	40	80 → 40	48	£45,000	£15,000	24 EFL League One teams 24 EFL League Two teams
Second round	30 November 2024	20	40 → 20	None	£75,000	£20,000	None
Third round	11 January 2025	32	64 → 32	44	£115,000	£25,000	20 Premier League teams 24 EFL Championship teams
Fourth round	8 February 2025	16	32 → 16	None	£120,000	None	None
Fifth round	1 March 2025	8	16 → 8	None	£225,000	None	None
Quarter-finals	29 March 2025	4	8 → 4	None	£450,000	None	None
Semi-finals	26 April 2025	2	4 → 2	None	£1,000,000	£500,000	None
Final	17 May 2025	1	2 → 1	None	£2,000,000	£1,000,000	None

== Rule changes ==
This is the first edition of the tournament to be played without replays in the proper rounds since the 2020–21 FA Cup and the first edition of the tournament since the 2021-22 FA Cup to have the final played one week before the end of the Premier League season. The changes were made as part of a six-year agreement between The Football Association and the Premier League due to pressure on the domestic calendar from expanded UEFA competitions, but were criticised since replays were cited as an important source of revenue for lower league clubs. The agreement saw all round dates return to weekends, with previous editions having had some dates in midweek.

VAR will be used in all matches from the fifth round onwards (and none prior), whereas in previous seasons it was used for all matches held in Premier League grounds and at Wembley Stadium.

== Qualifying ==
Teams that are not members of either the Premier League or English Football League competed in the qualifying rounds to secure one of 32 available places in the first round. The six-round qualifying competition began with the extra preliminary round on 3 August 2024, with the fourth and final qualifying round kicking off on 12 October.

The winners from the fourth qualifying round were Rushall Olympic, Tamworth, Oldham Athletic, Brackley Town, Kettering Town, Solihull Moors, Rochdale, Scarborough Athletic, York City, Harborough Town, Curzon Ashton, Gainsborough Trinity, Hednesford Town, Alfreton Town, Guiseley, Maidenhead United, Horsham, Aldershot Town, Southend United, Boreham Wood, Weston-super-Mare, Sutton United, Dagenham & Redbridge, Wealdstone, Barnet, Chesham United, Tonbridge Angels, Woking, Forest Green Rovers, Maidstone United, Worthing and Braintree Town.

Rushall Olympic and Harborough Town were appearing in the competition proper for the first time. Of the others, Braintree Town had last featured at this stage in 2016–17, Wealdstone had last done so in 2015–16, Tamworth and Hednesford Town had last done so in 2013–14 and Kettering Town had last done so in 2011–12.

== First round ==
A total of 80 teams played in the first round: 32 winners from the fourth qualifying round, 24 from League Two (tier 4), and 24 from League One (tier 3). Eighth tier side Hednesford Town (Northern Premier League Division One West) were the lowest-ranked team in the draw, which was made on 14 October 2024 by Stuart McCall and Danny Webber at Valley Parade.

Number of teams per tier still in competition
Premier League (Note: Premier League and Championship teams joined the competition in the third round.)	Championship	League One	League Two	Non-League	Total
20 / 20	24 / 24	24 / 24	24 / 24	32 / 32	124 / 124

1 November 2024	Notts County (4)	5–1	Alfreton Town (6)	Nottingham
19:45 GMT	Platt 16'; Jatta 48', 62'; Brown 85' (pen.), 90'	Report	Waldock 14'	Stadium: Meadow Lane; Attendance: 6,658; Referee: Scott Simpson

1 November 2024	Tamworth (5)	1–0	Huddersfield Town (3)	Tamworth
19:45 GMT	Maxwell 44' (o.g.)	Report		Stadium: The Lamb Ground; Attendance: 3,533; Referee: Benjamin Speedie

2 November 2024	Barrow (4)	0–1	Doncaster Rovers (4)	Barrow-in-Furness
15:00 GMT		Report	Kelly 83'	Stadium: Holker Street; Attendance: 2,605; Referee: Dale Baines

2 November 2024	Brackley Town (6)	0–0 (a.e.t.) (5–4 p)	Braintree Town (5)	Brackley
15:00 GMT		Report		Stadium: St James Park; Attendance: 1,121; Referee: Stuart Morland
	Penalties
	Byrne (penalty scored); Newton (penalty scored); Lyttle (penalty scored); O'Sullivan (penalty scored); Lilley (penalty missed); Bates (penalty missed); Lowe (penalty scored)		(penalty scored) Akinde; (penalty scored) Langston; (penalty scored) Francis; (penalty missed) Powell; (penalty scored) Vennings; (penalty missed) Robinson; (penalty missed) Lisbie

2 November 2024	Bradford City (4)	3–1	Aldershot Town (5)	Bradford
15:00 GMT	Oliver 50'; Maghoma 65' (o.g.); Kavanagh 68'	Report	Barham 32'	Stadium: Valley Parade; Attendance: 4,737; Referee: Craig Hicks

2 November 2024	Bristol Rovers (3)	3–1 (a.e.t.)	Weston-super-Mare (6)	Bristol
15:00 GMT	Lindsay 42'; Taylor 95'; Ward 120+2'	Report	Bastin 64'	Stadium: Memorial Stadium; Attendance: 6,898; Referee: Ollie Yates

2 November 2024	Burton Albion (3)	1–0	Scarborough Athletic (6)	Burton upon Trent
15:00 GMT	Kalinauskas 69'	Report		Stadium: Pirelli Stadium; Attendance: 3,066; Referee: Simon Mather

2 November 2024	Carlisle United (4)	0–2 (a.e.t.)	Wigan Athletic (3)	Carlisle
15:00 GMT		Report	S. Smith 105'; J. Smith 120+1'	Stadium: Brunton Park; Attendance: 4,532; Referee: Martin Woods

2 November 2024	Chesterfield (4)	3–1	Horsham (7)	Chesterfield
15:00 GMT	Grigg 6', 49'; Dobra 65'	Report	Dickson 85'	Stadium: SMH Group Stadium; Attendance: 4,887; Referee: Martin Coy

2 November 2024	Crewe Alexandra (4)	0–1	Dagenham & Redbridge (5)	Crewe
15:00 GMT		Report	Pereira 73' (pen.)	Stadium: Gresty Road; Attendance: 3,133; Referee: John Mulligan

2 November 2024	Exeter City (3)	5–3	Barnet (5)	Exeter
15:00 GMT	Magennis 13', 76' (pen.), 85' (pen.); Bird 90+6'; Doyle 90+11'	Report	Glover 39'; Brunt 59'; Kabamba 78'	Stadium: St James Park; Attendance: 4,244; Referee: Lee Swabey

2 November 2024	Gillingham (4)	0–2	Blackpool (3)	Gillingham
15:00 GMT		Report	Carey 38', 90+4'	Stadium: Priestfield Stadium; Attendance: 4,403; Referee: Carl Brook

2 November 2024	Grimsby Town (4)	0–1	Wealdstone (5)	Cleethorpes
15:00 GMT		Report	Reid 90'	Stadium: Blundell Park; Attendance: 3,174; Referee: James Westgate

2 November 2024	Hednesford Town (8)	4–4 (a.e.t.) (4–5 p)	Gainsborough Trinity (7)	Hednesford
15:00 GMT	Duku 4'; Holness 21'; McHale 49', 95'	Report	Howe 65', 77'; Lancaster 90+4'; Clarke 109'	Stadium: Keys Park; Attendance: 3,866; Referee: Jason Richardson
	Penalties
	Stevenson (penalty scored); Sparkes (penalty scored); Bearne (penalty missed); Holness (penalty scored); Taylor (penalty missed); Gwilt (penalty scored); Spence (penalty missed); Johnson (penalty missed); Rowe (penalty missed)		(penalty missed) Cogill; (penalty scored) Tuntulwana; (penalty missed) B. Johnson; (penalty scored) Stacey; (penalty scored) Lancaster; (penalty scored) Hornshaw; (penalty missed) Preston; (penalty missed) Clarke; (penalty scored) Helliwell

2 November 2024	Maidenhead United (5)	1–2 (a.e.t.)	Crawley Town (3)	Maidenhead
15:00 GMT	McCoulsky 64'	Report	Mullarkey 90+5'; Showunmi 116'	Stadium: York Road; Attendance: 1,814; Referee: Stephen Parkinson

2 November 2024	Newport County (4)	2–4	Peterborough United (3)	Newport
15:00 GMT	Glennon 5'; Whitmore 7'	Report	Odoh 27'; Randall 71'; Jones 89', 90+3'	Stadium: Rodney Parade; Attendance: 2,941; Referee: Stephen Martin

2 November 2024	Port Vale (4)	1–3	Barnsley (3)	Stoke-on-Trent
15:00 GMT	Curtis 31'	Report	Roberts 17'; Keillor-Dunn 64'; Phillips 82' (pen.)	Stadium: Vale Park; Attendance: 5,128; Referee: Charles Breakspear

2 November 2024	Reading (3)	2–0	Fleetwood Town (4)	Reading
15:00 GMT	Bindon 48'; Odubeko 86' (o.g.)	Report		Stadium: Madejski Stadium; Attendance: 3,685; Referee: Paul Howard

2 November 2024	Rochdale (5)	3–4	Bromley (4)	Rochdale
15:00 GMT	Beckwith 24'; Webster 52' (o.g.); Henderson 80'	Report	Whitely 1', 90+2'; Cheek 3'; Amantchi 90+1'	Stadium: Spotland Stadium; Attendance: 2,329; Referee: Aaron Bannister

2 November 2024	Rotherham United (3)	1–3	Cheltenham Town (4)	Rotherham
15:00 GMT	Wilks 37'	Report	Colwill 36', 45'; Archer 58'	Stadium: New York Stadium; Attendance: 2,770; Referee: Adam Herczeg

2 November 2024	Rushall Olympic (6)	0–2	Accrington Stanley (4)	Walsall
15:00 GMT		Report	J. Woods 73'; Walton 82'	Stadium: Dales Lane; Attendance: 1,311; Referee: Steven Copeland

2 November 2024	Salford City (4)	2–1	Shrewsbury Town (3)	Salford
15:00 GMT	Lund 5', 42'	Report	Marquis 15'	Stadium: Moor Lane; Attendance: 2,374; Referee: Leigh Doughty

2 November 2024	Solihull Moors (5)	3–0	Maidstone United (6)	Solihull
15:00 GMT	Clarke 49'; Stevens 88' (pen.); Wilkinson 90+7'	Report		Stadium: Damson Park; Attendance: 1,682; Referee: Richie Watkins

2 November 2024	Southend United (5)	3–4 (a.e.t.)	Charlton Athletic (3)	Southend-on-Sea
15:00 GMT	Bridge 45+1' (pen.); Coker 52'; Gillesphey 90+3' (o.g.)	Report	Leaburn 9'; Z. Mitchell 40'; Godden 66'; Ahadme 120+1'	Stadium: Roots Hall; Attendance: 8,875; Referee: Darren Drysdale

2 November 2024	Stevenage (3)	1–1 (a.e.t.) (5–4 p)	Guiseley (7)	Stevenage
15:00 GMT	Reid 53'	Report	Longbottom 83'	Stadium: Broadhall Way; Attendance: 2,224; Referee: Oliver Mackey
	Penalties
	Reid (penalty scored); Roberts (penalty missed); White (penalty missed); Young (penalty scored); List (penalty scored); Smith (penalty scored); Kemp (penalty scored)		(penalty scored) Longbottom; (penalty missed) Brown; (penalty scored) Ackroyd; (penalty scored) Ridehalgh; (penalty missed) Mbeka; (penalty scored) Bentley; (penalty missed) Ible

2 November 2024	Stockport County (3)	2–1 (a.e.t.)	Forest Green Rovers (5)	Stockport
15:00 GMT	Horsfall 64'; Wootton 97'	Report	Doidge 82'	Stadium: Edgeley Park; Attendance: 4,624; Referee: Scott Tallis

2 November 2024	Swindon Town (4)	2–1 (a.e.t.)	Colchester United (4)	Swindon
15:00 GMT	McGregor 83'; Tshimanga 106'	Report	Anderson 64'	Stadium: County Ground; Attendance: 4,855; Referee: Scott Jackson

2 November 2024	Tonbridge Angels (6)	1–4	Harborough Town (7)	Tonbridge
15:00 GMT	Shields 90+5'	Report	Malone 41'; Stephens 60', 72'; Forbes 87'	Stadium: Longmead Stadium; Attendance: 3,132; Referee: Ross Martin

2 November 2024	Tranmere Rovers (4)	1–2	Oldham Athletic (5)	Birkenhead
15:00 GMT	Jennings 9'	Report	Norwood 39'; Uchegbulam 61'	Stadium: Prenton Park; Attendance: 6,464; Referee: Declan Bourne

2 November 2024	Walsall (4)	2–1	Bolton Wanderers (3)	Walsall
15:00 GMT	L. Gordon 59'; Jellis 90+1'	Report	Sheehan 55'	Stadium: Bescot Stadium; Attendance: 6,684; Referee: Ruebyn Ricardo

2 November 2024	Woking (5)	0–1	Cambridge United (3)	Woking
15:00 GMT		Report	Brophy 73'	Stadium: Kingfield Stadium; Attendance: 3,105; Referee: Jamie O'Connor

2 November 2024	Worthing (6)	0–2	Morecambe (4)	Worthing
15:00 GMT		Report	Slew 7'; Williams 88'	Stadium: Woodside Road; Attendance: 3,110; Referee: Sam Mulhall

2 November 2024	Wycombe Wanderers (3)	3–2	York City (5)	High Wycombe
15:00 GMT	Leahy 14' (pen.), 57'; Kodua 21'	Report	Sinclair 31'; Felix 90+4'	Stadium: Adams Park; Attendance: 2,765; Referee: Tom Reeves

2 November 2024	Northampton Town (3)	1–2 (a.e.t.)	Kettering Town (7)	Northampton
17:30 GMT	Johnson 28' (o.g.)	Report	Miller 66'; Ranger 92'	Stadium: Sixfields Stadium; Attendance: 7,104; Referee: Elliot Bell

3 November 2024	Milton Keynes Dons (4)	0–2	AFC Wimbledon (4)	Milton Keynes
12:30 GMT		Report	Stevens 44'; Bugiel 51'	Stadium: Stadium MK; Attendance: 10,419; Referee: Matt Corlett

3 November 2024	Sutton United (5)	0–1	Birmingham City (3)	Sutton
12:30 GMT		Report	Willumsson 34'	Stadium: Gander Green Lane; Attendance: 4,804; Referee: Ben Atkinson

3 November 2024	Boreham Wood (6)	2–2 (a.e.t.) (1–3 p)	Leyton Orient (3)	Borehamwood
14:00 GMT	Marsh 69'; O'Connell 85'	Report	Perkins 12'; Agyei 49'	Stadium: Meadow Park; Attendance: 2,101; Referee: James Durkin
	Penalties
	Whelan (penalty missed); Bush (penalty missed); Hare (penalty scored); Dixon (penalty missed)		(penalty scored) Jaiyesimi; (penalty missed) O'Neill; (penalty scored) Pratley; (penalty scored) Galbraith

3 November 2024	Curzon Ashton (6)	0–4	Mansfield Town (3)	Ashton-under-Lyne
14:00 GMT		Report	Akins 16' (pen.); S. Quinn 30'; Waine 73'; B. Quinn 86'	Stadium: Tameside Stadium; Attendance: 2,553; Referee: Thomas Parsons

3 November 2024	Harrogate Town (4)	1–0	Wrexham (3)	Harrogate
15:30 GMT	Muldoon 24'	Report		Stadium: Wetherby Road; Attendance: 3,893; Referee: Edward Duckworth

4 November 2024	Chesham United (6)	0–4	Lincoln City (3)	Chesham
19:15 GMT		Report	Moylan 44'; Makama 49'; McGrandles 65'; Adebiyi 87' (o.g.)	Stadium: The Meadow; Attendance: 3,963; Referee: Alex Chilowicz

== Second round ==
The 40 winners from the first round played in the second round. Seventh tier sides Gainsborough Trinity (Northern Premier League Premier Division), Harborough Town (Southern League Premier Division Central) and Kettering Town (Southern League Premier Division Central) were the lowest-ranked teams in the draw, which was made on 3 November 2024 by Emile Heskey and Leon Osman.

Number of teams per tier still in competition
Premier League (Note: Premier League and Championship teams joined the competition in the third round.)	Championship	League One	League Two	Non-League	Total
20 / 20	24 / 24	18 / 24	13 / 24	9 / 32	84 / 124

29 November 2024	Harrogate Town (4)	1–0	Gainsborough Trinity (7)	Harrogate
19:45 GMT	Cornelius 57'	Report		Stadium: Wetherby Road; Attendance: 4,010; Referee: Farai Hallam

30 November 2024	Wealdstone (5)	0–2	Wycombe Wanderers (3)	Ruislip
11:30 GMT		Report	Lubala 29'; Kone 84'	Stadium: Grosvenor Vale; Attendance: 3,534; Referee: Alex Chilowicz

30 November 2024	Accrington Stanley (4)	2–2 (a.e.t.) (4–1 p)	Swindon Town (4)	Accrington
15:00 GMT	Walton 17', 90+1'	Report	Hall 45+2'; Cotterill 70'	Stadium: Crown Ground; Attendance: 1,534; Referee: Geoff Eltringham
	Penalties
	Popoola (penalty scored); Knowles (penalty scored); B. Woods (penalty scored); Khumbeni (penalty scored)		(penalty missed) Drinan; (penalty missed) Cotterill; (penalty scored) Wright

30 November 2024	Barnsley (3)	0–0 (a.e.t.) (3–4 p)	Bristol Rovers (3)	Barnsley
15:00 GMT		Report		Stadium: Oakwell; Attendance: 4,801; Referee: Scott Oldham
	Penalties
	Phillips (penalty missed); Cosgrove (penalty scored); Russell (penalty scored); Jaló (penalty scored); Earl (penalty missed)		(penalty scored) Martin; (penalty scored) Sotiriou; (penalty scored) Sinclair; (penalty scored) Forde

30 November 2024	Cambridge United (3)	1–2 (a.e.t.)	Wigan Athletic (3)	Cambridge
15:00 GMT	Njoku 77'	Report	Aasgaard 85'; J. Smith 119'	Stadium: Abbey Stadium; Attendance: 3,830; Referee: Zac Kennard-Kettle

30 November 2024	Crawley Town (3)	3–4	Lincoln City (3)	Crawley
15:00 GMT	Roles 10'; Showunmi 13'; Kelly 82'	Report	O'Connor 19'; Makama 39'; Ring 47'; Moylan 48'	Stadium: Broadfield Stadium; Attendance: 2,831; Referee: Sunny Singh Gill

30 November 2024	Exeter City (3)	2–0	Chesterfield (4)	Exeter
15:00 GMT	Crama 45+2'; Magennis 69'	Report		Stadium: St James Park; Attendance: 4,782; Referee: Jacob Miles

30 November 2024	Leyton Orient (3)	2–1 (a.e.t.)	Oldham Athletic (5)	Leyton
15:00 GMT	Keeley 90+9'; Agyei 120+1'	Report	Monthé 47'	Stadium: Brisbane Road; Attendance: 6,078; Referee: Alan Young

30 November 2024	Morecambe (4)	1–0	Bradford City (4)	Morecambe
15:00 GMT	Slew 81'	Report		Stadium: Mazuma Mobile Stadium; Attendance: 3,101; Referee: Sebastian Stockbridge

30 November 2024	Peterborough United (3)	4–3	Notts County (4)	Peterborough
15:00 GMT	Jones 10', 73'; Randall 77'; Odoh 87'	Report	Scott 13'; Platt 16'; Abbott 90+6'	Stadium: London Road Stadium; Attendance: 6,310; Referee: Ruebyn Ricardo

30 November 2024	Salford City (4)	2–0	Cheltenham Town (4)	Salford
15:00 GMT	Okoronkwo 20'; Stockton 22' (pen.)	Report		Stadium: Moor Lane; Attendance: 1,968; Referee: Martin Coy

30 November 2024	Stevenage (3)	0–1	Mansfield Town (3)	Stevenage
15:00 GMT		Report	McLaughlin 48'	Stadium: Broadhall Way; Attendance: 2,464; Referee: Tom Reeves

30 November 2024	Stockport County (3)	3–1	Brackley Town (6)	Stockport
15:00 GMT	Collar 15'; Wootton 18'; Olaofe 86'	Report	Connolly 55' (o.g.)	Stadium: Edgeley Park; Attendance: 5,637; Referee: Simon Mather

30 November 2024	Walsall (4)	0–4	Charlton Athletic (3)	Walsall
15:00 GMT		Report	Ahadme 16', 85'; Godden 28'; T. Campbell 90+2'	Stadium: Bescot Stadium; Attendance: 6,161; Referee: Ollie Yates

30 November 2024	AFC Wimbledon (4)	1–2	Dagenham & Redbridge (5)	Wimbledon
19:15 GMT	Stevens 45+8'	Report	Morias 35'; Rees 79'	Stadium: Plough Lane; Attendance: 5,907; Referee: Craig Hicks

1 December 2024	Kettering Town (7)	1–2 (a.e.t.)	Doncaster Rovers (4)	Burton Latimer
12:00 GMT	Noel-Williams 30'	Report	Sharp 75', 105'	Stadium: Latimer Park; Attendance: 2,803; Referee: Benjamin Speedie

1 December 2024	Blackpool (3)	1–2	Birmingham City (3)	Blackpool
13:00 GMT	Rhodes 55'	Report	Dykes 6'; Jutkiewicz 24'	Stadium: Bloomfield Road; Attendance: 4,835; Referee: Tom Nield

1 December 2024	Burton Albion (3)	1–1 (a.e.t.) (3–4 p)	Tamworth (5)	Burton upon Trent
14:00 GMT	Bennett 92'	Report	Maher 94'	Stadium: Pirelli Stadium; Attendance: 4,393; Referee: Thomas Kirk
	Penalties
	Orsi (penalty missed); Bennett (penalty scored); Whitfield (penalty missed); Watt (penalty scored); Sweeney (penalty scored)		(penalty scored) Milnes; (penalty scored) Fletcher; (penalty missed) Crompton; (penalty scored) Morrison; (penalty scored) Hollis

1 December 2024	Reading (3)	5–3 (a.e.t.)	Harborough Town (7)	Reading
14:00 GMT	Camará 20'; Savage 59'; Akande 65'; Campbell 93', 96'	Report	Robinson 18'; O'Sullivan 21'; Tonge 86'	Stadium: Madejski Stadium; Attendance: 7,916; Referee: Declan Bourne

1 December 2024	Solihull Moors (5)	1–2	Bromley (4)	Solihull
15:15 GMT	Wilkinson 12'	Report	Sowunmi 15'; Imray 61'	Stadium: Damson Park; Attendance: 1,770; Referee: Matthew Russell

== Third round ==
A total of 64 clubs played in the third round: 20 winners from the second round, 20 from Premier League (tier 1), and 24 from Championship (tier 2). National League (tier 5) sides Dagenham & Redbridge and Tamworth were the lowest-ranked teams in the draw, which was made on 2 December 2024 by Mark Hughes and Dion Dublin at Old Trafford.

Number of teams per tier still in competition
Premier League	Championship	League One	League Two	Non-League	Total
20 / 20	24 / 24	12 / 24	6 / 24	2 / 32	64 / 124

9 January 2025	Sheffield United (2)	0–1	Cardiff City (2)	Sheffield
19:00 GMT		Report	Ashford 19'	Stadium: Bramall Lane; Attendance: 6,126; Referee: Adam Herczeg

9 January 2025	Everton (1)	2–0	Peterborough United (3)	Liverpool
19:45 GMT	Beto 42'; Ndiaye 90+8' (pen.)	Report		Stadium: Goodison Park; Attendance: 38,895; Referee: Thomas Bramall

9 January 2025	Fulham (1)	4–1	Watford (2)	Fulham
19:45 GMT	Muniz 26'; Jiménez 49' (pen.); Andersen 65'; Castagne 85'	Report	Vata 33'	Stadium: Craven Cottage; Attendance: 15,981; Referee: Matt Donohue

10 January 2025	Wycombe Wanderers (3)	2–0	Portsmouth (2)	High Wycombe
19:45 GMT	Hanlan 17'; Bradley 27'	Report		Stadium: Adams Park; Attendance: 5,240; Referee: Tom Reeves

10 January 2025	Aston Villa (1)	2–1	West Ham United (1)	Birmingham
20:00 GMT	Onana 71'; Rogers 76'	Report	Lucas Paquetá 9'	Stadium: Villa Park; Attendance: 40,989; Referee: Tim Robinson

11 January 2025	Birmingham City (3)	2–1	Lincoln City (3)	Birmingham
12:00 GMT	Yokoyama 1'; Dykes 77'	Report	Makama 90' (pen.)	Stadium: St Andrew's; Attendance: 17,032; Referee: Martin Coy

11 January 2025	Bristol City (2)	1–2	Wolverhampton Wanderers (1)	Bristol
12:00 GMT	Twine 45+1'	Report	Aït-Nouri 10'; R. Gomes 21'	Stadium: Ashton Gate; Attendance: 23,485; Referee: Robert Jones

11 January 2025	Middlesbrough (2)	0–1	Blackburn Rovers (2)	Middlesbrough
12:00 GMT		Report	Weimann 70'	Stadium: Riverside Stadium; Attendance: 16,794; Referee: Dean Whitestone

11 January 2025	Liverpool (1)	4–0	Accrington Stanley (4)	Liverpool
12:15 GMT	Jota 29'; Alexander-Arnold 45'; Danns 76'; Chiesa 90'	Report		Stadium: Anfield; Attendance: 60,261; Referee: Lewis Smith

11 January 2025	Leicester City (1)	6–2	Queens Park Rangers (2)	Leicester
14:00 GMT	Justin 8', 63'; Mavididi 35'; Buonanotte 38'; Vardy 51' (pen.); Faes 90+3'	Report	Varane 18'; Kolli 45+2'	Stadium: King Power Stadium; Attendance: 28,242; Referee: David Webb

11 January 2025	Bournemouth (1)	5–1	West Bromwich Albion (2)	Bournemouth
15:00 GMT	Kluivert 27'; Ouattara 34', 44'; Semenyo 47'; Jebbison 90+2'	Report	Taylor 14'	Stadium: Dean Court; Attendance: 10,916; Referee: John Busby

11 January 2025	Brentford (1)	0–1	Plymouth Argyle (2)	Brentford
15:00 GMT		Report	Whittaker 82'	Stadium: Brentford Community Stadium; Attendance: 16,790; Referee: Ben Toner

11 January 2025	Chelsea (1)	5–0	Morecambe (4)	Fulham
15:00 GMT	Adarabioyo 39', 70'; Nkunku 50'; Félix 75', 77'	Report		Stadium: Stamford Bridge; Attendance: 38,998; Referee: Andrew Kitchen

11 January 2025	Exeter City (3)	3–1	Oxford United (2)	Exeter
15:00 GMT	Mitchell 22', 40'; Harper 64'	Report	Phillips 14'	Stadium: St James Park; Attendance: 6,149; Referee: Scott Oldham

11 January 2025	Norwich City (2)	0–4	Brighton & Hove Albion (1)	Norwich
15:00 GMT		Report	Rutter 37', 45+2'; Enciso 59'; March 74'	Stadium: Carrow Road; Attendance: 24,738; Referee: Simon Hooper

11 January 2025	Nottingham Forest (1)	2–0	Luton Town (2)	West Bridgford
15:00 GMT	Yates 40'; Sosa 68'	Report		Stadium: City Ground; Attendance: 29,445; Referee: Darren England

11 January 2025	Reading (3)	1–3 (a.e.t.)	Burnley (2)	Reading
15:00 GMT	Wing 77'	Report	Foster 71'; Flemming 100', 109'	Stadium: Madejski Stadium; Attendance: 7,039; Referee: Andy Davies

11 January 2025	Sunderland (2)	1–2 (a.e.t.)	Stoke City (2)	Sunderland
15:00 GMT	Aleksić 64'	Report	Cannon 4' (pen.); Ennis 112'	Stadium: Stadium of Light; Attendance: 15,774; Referee: Elliot Bell

11 January 2025	Leeds United (2)	1–0	Harrogate Town (4)	Leeds
17:45 GMT	Ramazani 59'	Report		Stadium: Elland Road; Attendance: 35,584; Referee: James Bell

11 January 2025	Manchester City (1)	8–0	Salford City (4)	Manchester
17:45 GMT	Doku 8', 69' (pen.); Mubama 20'; O'Reilly 43'; Grealish 49' (pen.); McAtee 62', 72', 81'	Report		Stadium: City of Manchester Stadium; Attendance: 52,056; Referee: Josh Smith

11 January 2025	Coventry City (2)	1–1 (a.e.t.) (4–3 p)	Sheffield Wednesday (2)	Coventry
18:00 GMT	Kitching 26'	Report	Musaba 90+3'	Stadium: Coventry Building Society Arena; Attendance: 20,906; Referee: Thomas Kirk
	Penalties
	Torp (penalty scored); Bidwell (penalty missed); Eccles (penalty scored); Rudoni (penalty scored); Bassette (penalty scored)		(penalty scored) Windass; (penalty scored) Bannan; (penalty missed) J. Lowe; (penalty scored) S. Charles; (penalty missed) Kobacki

12 January 2025	Hull City (2)	1–1 (a.e.t.) (4–5 p)	Doncaster Rovers (4)	Kingston upon Hull
12:00 GMT	Puerta 80'	Report	Molyneux 51'	Stadium: MKM Stadium; Attendance: 10,032; Referee: Sunny Singh Gill
	Penalties
	João Pedro (penalty scored); McLoughlin (penalty scored); L. Coyle (penalty scored); Slater (penalty scored); Burstow (penalty missed); A. Jones (penalty missed)		(penalty missed) Ironside; (penalty scored) Sterry; (penalty scored) Gibson; (penalty scored) Close; (penalty scored) Molyneux; (penalty scored) Clifton

12 January 2025	Tamworth (5)	0–3 (a.e.t.)	Tottenham Hotspur (1)	Tamworth
12:30 GMT		Report	Tshikuna 101' (o.g.); Kulusevski 107'; Johnson 118'	Stadium: The Lamb Ground; Attendance: 3,720; Referee: Peter Bankes

12 January 2025	Arsenal (1)	1–1 (a.e.t.) (3–5 p)	Manchester United (1)	Holloway
15:00 GMT	Gabriel 63'	Report	Fernandes 52'	Stadium: Emirates Stadium; Attendance: 60,109; Referee: Andrew Madley
	Penalties
	Ødegaard (penalty scored); Havertz (penalty missed); Rice (penalty scored); Partey (penalty scored)		(penalty scored) Fernandes; (penalty scored) Amad; (penalty scored) Yoro; (penalty scored) Martínez; (penalty scored) Zirkzee

12 January 2025	Crystal Palace (1)	1–0	Stockport County (3)	Selhurst
15:00 GMT	Eze 4'	Report		Stadium: Selhurst Park; Attendance: 21,104; Referee: Stuart Attwell

12 January 2025	Ipswich Town (1)	3–0	Bristol Rovers (3)	Ipswich
15:00 GMT	Phillips 18'; J. Clarke 24'; Taylor 37'	Report		Stadium: Portman Road; Attendance: 27,678; Referee: Oliver Langford

12 January 2025	Newcastle United (1)	3–1	Bromley (4)	Newcastle upon Tyne
15:00 GMT	Miley 16'; Gordon 49' (pen.); Osula 61'	Report	Congreve 8'	Stadium: St James' Park; Attendance: 52,088; Referee: Will Finnie

12 January 2025	Southampton (1)	3–0	Swansea City (2)	Southampton
16:30 GMT	Kamaldeen 20'; Dibling 35', 65'	Report		Stadium: St Mary's Stadium; Attendance: 12,120; Referee: Tony Harrington

13 January 2025	Millwall (2)	3–0	Dagenham & Redbridge (5)	Bermondsey
19:30 GMT	Ivanović 30'; De Norre 70'; Bangura-Williams 85'	Report		Stadium: The Den; Attendance: 5,625; Referee: Bobby Madley

14 January 2025	Leyton Orient (3)	1–1 (a.e.t.) (6–5 p)	Derby County (2)	Leyton
19:45 GMT	Kelman 20'	Report	Brown 24'	Stadium: Brisbane Road; Attendance: 8,279; Referee: Benjamin Speedie
	Penalties
	Donley (penalty scored); James (penalty scored); Brown (penalty scored); Cooper (penalty scored); Kelman (penalty scored); Obiero (penalty scored)		(penalty scored) Collins; (penalty scored) Goudmijn; (penalty scored) Harness; (penalty scored) Jackson; (penalty scored) Barkhuizen; (penalty missed) Elder
Note: Fixture was initially scheduled for 11 January, but was postponed due to a frozen pitch.

14 January 2025	Mansfield Town (3)	0–2	Wigan Athletic (3)	Mansfield
19:45 GMT		Report	Aasgaard 48', 54'	Stadium: Field Mill; Attendance: 4,523; Referee: Alex Chilowicz
Note: Fixture was initially scheduled for 11 January, but was postponed due to a frozen pitch.

14 January 2025	Preston North End (2)	2–1	Charlton Athletic (3)	Preston
19:45 GMT	Osmajić 32', 47'	Report	Berry 40'	Stadium: Deepdale; Attendance: 7,734; Referee: Ruebyn Ricardo
Note: Fixture was initially scheduled for 11 January, but was postponed due to a frozen pitch.

== Fourth round ==
The 32 winners from the third round played in the fourth round. League Two side Doncaster Rovers were the lowest-ranked team in the draw, which was made on 12 January 2025 by Martin Keown and Mark Schwarzer at Emirates Stadium.

Number of teams per tier still in competition
Premier League	Championship	League One	League Two	Non-League	Total
17 / 20	9 / 24	5 / 24	1 / 24	0 / 32	32 / 124

7 February 2025	Manchester United (1)	2–1	Leicester City (1)	Trafford
20:00 GMT	Zirkzee 68'; Maguire 90+3'	Report	De Cordova-Reid 42'	Stadium: Old Trafford; Attendance: 73,693; Referee: Michael Salisbury

8 February 2025	Leeds United (2)	0–2	Millwall (2)	Leeds
12:15 GMT		Report	Azeez 30', 55'	Stadium: Elland Road; Attendance: 34,923; Referee: Gavin Ward

8 February 2025	Leyton Orient (3)	1–2	Manchester City (1)	Leyton
12:15 GMT	Ortega 16' (o.g.)	Report	Khusanov 56'; De Bruyne 79'	Stadium: Brisbane Road; Attendance: 8,749; Referee: Darren Bond

8 February 2025	Coventry City (2)	1–4	Ipswich Town (1)	Coventry
15:00 GMT	Latibeaudiere 8'	Report	Hirst 2' (pen.); J. Clarke 28', 37'; Philogene 63'	Stadium: Coventry Building Society Arena; Attendance: 30,055; Referee: Ben Toner

8 February 2025	Everton (1)	0–2	Bournemouth (1)	Liverpool
15:00 GMT		Report	Semenyo 23' (pen.); Jebbison 43'	Stadium: Goodison Park; Attendance: 38,909; Referee: John Brooks

8 February 2025	Preston North End (2)	0–0 (a.e.t.) (4–2 p)	Wycombe Wanderers (3)	Preston
15:00 GMT		Report		Stadium: Deepdale; Attendance: 10,444; Referee: Benjamin Speedie
	Penalties
	Greenwood (penalty scored); Osmajić (penalty scored); Frøkjær-Jensen (penalty scored); McCann (penalty missed); Evans (penalty scored)		(penalty scored) Lubala; (penalty missed) Udoh; (penalty missed) Reach; (penalty scored) Scowen

8 February 2025	Southampton (1)	0–1	Burnley (2)	Southampton
15:00 GMT		Report	Edwards 77'	Stadium: St Mary's Stadium; Attendance: 15,253; Referee: Will Finnie

8 February 2025	Stoke City (2)	3–3 (a.e.t.) (2–4 p)	Cardiff City (2)	Stoke-on-Trent
15:00 GMT	Koumas 42', 46'; Baker 57' (pen.)	Report	R. Colwill 8', 68'; Salech 19'	Stadium: Bet365 Stadium; Attendance: 12,641; Referee: Thomas Kirk
	Penalties
	Tezgel (penalty scored); Seko (penalty missed); Rose (penalty missed); Burger (penalty scored)		(penalty scored) Ralls; (penalty missed) Salech; (penalty scored) Chambers; (penalty scored) Willock; (penalty scored) R. Colwill

8 February 2025	Wigan Athletic (3)	1–2	Fulham (1)	Wigan
15:00 GMT	J. Smith 50'	Report	Muniz 23', 55'	Stadium: Brick Community Stadium; Attendance: 12,281; Referee: David Webb

8 February 2025	Birmingham City (3)	2–3	Newcastle United (1)	Birmingham
17:45 GMT	Laird 1'; Iwata 40'	Report	Willock 21', 82'; Wilson 26'	Stadium: St Andrew's; Attendance: 27,994; Referee: Matt Donohue

8 February 2025	Brighton & Hove Albion (1)	2–1	Chelsea (1)	Brighton and Hove
20:00 GMT	Rutter 12'; Mitoma 57'	Report	Verbruggen 5' (o.g.)	Stadium: Falmer Stadium; Attendance: 23,279; Referee: Jarred Gillett

9 February 2025	Blackburn Rovers (2)	0–2	Wolverhampton Wanderers (1)	Blackburn
12:30 GMT		Report	João Gomes 33'; Cunha 34'	Stadium: Ewood Park; Attendance: 15,141; Referee: Lewis Smith

9 February 2025	Plymouth Argyle (2)	1–0	Liverpool (1)	Plymouth
15:00 GMT	Hardie 53' (pen.)	Report		Stadium: Home Park; Attendance: 16,724; Referee: Sam Barrott

9 February 2025	Aston Villa (1)	2–1	Tottenham Hotspur (1)	Birmingham
17:35 GMT	Ramsey 1'; Rogers 64'	Report	Tel 90+1'	Stadium: Villa Park; Attendance: 40,773; Referee: Anthony Taylor

10 February 2025	Doncaster Rovers (4)	0–2	Crystal Palace (1)	Doncaster
19:45 GMT		Report	Muñoz 31'; Devenny 55'	Stadium: Eco-Power Stadium; Attendance: 12,739; Referee: Farai Hallam

11 February 2025	Exeter City (3)	2–2 (a.e.t.) (2–4 p)	Nottingham Forest (1)	Exeter
20:00 GMT	Magennis 5', 50'	Report	Sosa 15'; Awoniyi 37'	Stadium: St James Park; Attendance: 8,330; Referee: Andrew Kitchen
	Penalties
	Magennis (penalty scored); Cole (penalty missed); A. MacDonald (penalty missed); Yogane (penalty scored)		(penalty scored) Wood; (penalty scored) Gibbs-White; (penalty scored) Anderson; (penalty scored) Williams

== Fifth round ==
The 16 winners from the fourth round played in the fifth round. Championship sides Burnley, Cardiff City, Millwall, Plymouth Argyle and Preston North End were the lowest-ranked teams in the draw, which was made on 10 February 2025 by Theo Walcott and Alex Scott.

Number of teams per tier still in competition
Premier League	Championship	League One	League Two	Non-League	Total
11 / 20	5 / 24	0 / 24	0 / 24	0 / 32	16 / 124

28 February 2025	Aston Villa (1)	2–0	Cardiff City (2)	Birmingham
20:00 GMT	Asensio 68', 80'	Report		Stadium: Villa Park; Attendance: 40,175; Referee: Peter Bankes

1 March 2025	Crystal Palace (1)	3–1	Millwall (2)	Selhurst
12:15 GMT	Tanganga 33' (o.g.); Muñoz 40'; Nketiah 81'	Report	Harding 45+13'	Stadium: Selhurst Park; Attendance: 21,263; Referee: Michael Oliver

1 March 2025	Preston North End (2)	3–0	Burnley (2)	Preston
12:15 GMT	Brady 31'; Osmajić 44'; Keane 73'	Report		Stadium: Deepdale; Attendance: 17,761; Referee: John Brooks

1 March 2025	Bournemouth (1)	1–1 (a.e.t.) (5–4 p)	Wolverhampton Wanderers (1)	Bournemouth
15:00 GMT	Evanilson 30'	Report	Cunha 60'	Stadium: Dean Court; Attendance: 11,021; Referee: Sam Barrott
	Penalties
	Kluivert (penalty scored); Ouattara (penalty scored); Tavernier (penalty scored); Huijsen (penalty missed); Cook (penalty scored); Sinisterra (penalty scored)		(penalty scored) Larsen; (penalty scored) André; (penalty scored) Aït-Nouri; (penalty scored) T. Gomes; (penalty missed) Doherty; (penalty missed) Traoré

1 March 2025	Manchester City (1)	3–1	Plymouth Argyle (2)	Manchester
17:45 GMT	O'Reilly 45+1', 76'; De Bruyne 90'	Report	Talovierov 38'	Stadium: City of Manchester Stadium; Attendance: 50,044; Referee: Craig Pawson

2 March 2025	Newcastle United (1)	1–2 (a.e.t.)	Brighton & Hove Albion (1)	Newcastle upon Tyne
13:45 GMT	Isak 22' (pen.)	Report	Minteh 44'; Welbeck 114'	Stadium: St James' Park; Attendance: 51,566; Referee: Anthony Taylor

2 March 2025	Manchester United (1)	1–1 (a.e.t.) (3–4 p)	Fulham (1)	Trafford
16:30 GMT	Fernandes 71'	Report	Bassey 45+1'	Stadium: Old Trafford; Attendance: 67,614; Referee: Stuart Attwell
	Penalties
	Fernandes (penalty scored); Dalot (penalty scored); Casemiro (penalty scored); Lindelöf (penalty missed); Zirkzee (penalty missed)		(penalty scored) Jiménez; (penalty scored) Berge; (penalty scored) Willian; (penalty scored) Robinson

3 March 2025	Nottingham Forest (1)	1–1 (a.e.t.) (5–4 p)	Ipswich Town (1)	West Bridgford
19:30 GMT	Yates 68'	Report	Hirst 53'	Stadium: City Ground; Attendance: 29,171; Referee: Tony Harrington
	Penalties
	Wood (penalty scored); Gibbs-White (penalty scored); Anderson (penalty scored); Williams (penalty scored); Hudson-Odoi (penalty scored)		(penalty scored) Morsy; (penalty scored) Delap; (penalty scored) Cajuste; (penalty scored) Johnson; (penalty missed) Taylor

== Quarter-finals ==
The eight winners from the fifth round played in the quarter-finals. Championship side Preston North End were the lowest-ranked team in the draw, which was made on 2 March 2025 by Denis Irwin and Danny Murphy at Old Trafford.

Number of teams per tier still in competition
Premier League	Championship	League One	League Two	Non-League	Total
7 / 20	1 / 24	0 / 24	0 / 24	0 / 32	8 / 124

29 March 2025	Fulham (1)	0–3	Crystal Palace (1)	Fulham
12:15 GMT		Report	Eze 34'; Sarr 38'; Nketiah 75'	Stadium: Craven Cottage; Attendance: 26,222; Referee: Darren England

29 March 2025	Brighton & Hove Albion (1)	0–0 (a.e.t.) (3–4 p)	Nottingham Forest (1)	Brighton and Hove
17:15 GMT		Report		Stadium: Falmer Stadium; Attendance: 29,930; Referee: Peter Bankes
	Penalties
	João Pedro (penalty scored); Gruda (penalty scored); Hinshelwood (penalty missed); Gómez (penalty missed); Dunk (penalty scored)		(penalty scored) Anderson; (penalty scored) Hudson-Odoi; (penalty missed) Williams; (penalty scored) Milenković; (penalty scored) Yates

30 March 2025	Preston North End (2)	0–3	Aston Villa (1)	Preston
13:30 BST		Report	Rashford 58', 63' (pen.); Ramsey 71'	Stadium: Deepdale; Attendance: 22,198; Referee: Chris Kavanagh

30 March 2025	Bournemouth (1)	1–2	Manchester City (1)	Bournemouth
16:30 BST	Evanilson 21'	Report	Haaland 49'; Marmoush 63'	Stadium: Dean Court; Attendance: 10,954; Referee: Stuart Attwell

== Semi-finals ==
The four winners from the quarter-finals played in the semi-finals. All four teams remaining were Premier League sides. The draw was made on 30 March 2025 by Joe Hart at Deepdale.

Number of teams per tier still in competition
Premier League	Championship	League One	League Two	Non-League	Total
4 / 20	0 / 24	0 / 24	0 / 24	0 / 32	4 / 124

26 April 2025	Crystal Palace (1)	3–0	Aston Villa (1)	Wembley
17:15 BST	Eze 31'; Sarr 58', 90+4'	Report		Stadium: Wembley Stadium; Attendance: 82,301; Referee: Anthony Taylor

27 April 2025	Nottingham Forest (1)	0–2	Manchester City (1)	Wembley
16:30 BST		Report	Lewis 2'; Gvardiol 51'	Stadium: Wembley Stadium; Attendance: 72,976; Referee: Michael Oliver

== Final ==
Number of teams per tier still in competition
Premier League	Championship	League One	League Two	Non-League	Total
2 / 20	0 / 24	0 / 24	0 / 24	0 / 32	2 / 124

17 May 2025
16:30 BST

Crystal Palace	1–0	Manchester City
Eze 16'	Report

Wembley Stadium, London
Attendance: 84,163
Referee: Stuart Attwell (Birmingham)

== Top goalscorers ==
Following the conclusion of the competition, Ashford United player Gary Lockyer was awarded the FA Cup Golden Ball Award, commemorating him as the top scorer of the season from the extra preliminary round through to the final with 10 goals.

Rank	Player	Club	Goals
1	(Northern Ireland) Josh Magennis	Exeter City	6
2	(England) Eberechi Eze	Crystal Palace	4
2	(England) Ricky-Jade Jones	Peterborough United	4
4	(Norway) Thelo Aasgaard	Wigan Athletic	3
4	(Morocco) Gassan Ahadme	Charlton Athletic	3
4	(England) Jack Clarke	Ipswich Town	3
4	(England) Jovon Makama	Lincoln City	3
4	(England) James McAtee	Manchester City	3
4	(Brazil) Rodrigo Muniz	Fulham	3
4	(England) Nico O'Reilly	Manchester City	3
4	(Montenegro) Milutin Osmajić	Preston North End	3
4	(France) Georginio Rutter	Brighton & Hove Albion	3
4	(Senegal) Ismaïla Sarr	Crystal Palace	3
4	(England) Jonny Smith	Wigan Athletic	3
4	(England) Tyler Walton	Accrington Stanley	3

== Television rights ==
Both BBC Sport and ITV Sport air FA Cup matches until the end of this season.

Broadcaster	Summary
BBC Sport	18 live matches per season, with highlights of the FA Community Shield. BBC Sport has second and third picks of matches in the second round, fourth round and the quarter-finals, as well as first and fourth pick of matches in the first, third and fifth rounds, and first pick of the semi-finals.
ITV Sport	At least 20 live matches per season, plus live coverage of the FA Community Shield. ITV has first pick and fourth pick of matches in the second round, fourth round and the quarter-finals, as well as second and third picks for the first, third and fifth rounds and second pick of the semi-finals.

Round	Date	Fixture	Kick-off	Channels	
Round	Date	Fixture	Kick-off	Digital	TV
First round	1 November 2024	Tamworth v Huddersfield Town	19:45	BBC iPlayer	BBC Two
First round	2 November 2024	Northampton Town v Kettering Town	17:30	BBC iPlayer	BBC Two
First round	3 November 2024	Sutton United v Birmingham City	12:30	ITVX	ITV1
First round	3 November 2024	Sutton United v Birmingham City	12:30	STV Player	STV
First round	3 November 2024	Harrogate Town v Wrexham	15:30	ITVX	—N/a
First round	4 November 2024	Chesham United v Lincoln City	19:15	ITVX	ITV4
Second round	29 November 2024	Harrogate Town v Gainsborough Trinity	19:45	BBC iPlayer	BBC Two
Second round	30 November 2024	Wealdstone v Wycombe Wanderers	11:30	ITVX	ITV1
Second round	30 November 2024	Wealdstone v Wycombe Wanderers	11:30	STV Player	STV
Second round	30 November 2024	AFC Wimbledon v Dagenham & Redbridge	19:15	ITVX	—N/a
Second round	1 December 2024	Kettering Town v Doncaster Rovers	12:00	BBC iPlayer	BBC Two
Second round	1 December 2024	Solihull Moors v Bromley	15:15	ITVX	ITV1
Second round	1 December 2024	Solihull Moors v Bromley	15:15	STV Player	STV
Third round	9 January 2025	Sheffield United v Cardiff City	19:00	BBC iPlayer	BBC One Wales
Third round	9 January 2025	Everton v Peterborough United	19:45	BBC iPlayer	—N/a
Third round	10 January 2025	Aston Villa v West Ham United	20:00	ITVX	ITV1
Third round	10 January 2025	Aston Villa v West Ham United	20:00	STV Player	STV
Third round	11 January 2025	Liverpool v Accrington Stanley	12:15	ITVX	ITV1
Third round	11 January 2025	Liverpool v Accrington Stanley	12:15	STV Player	STV
Third round	11 January 2025	Manchester City v Salford City	17:45	BBC iPlayer	BBC One
Third round	11 January 2025	Leeds United v Harrogate Town	17:45	BBC iPlayer	—N/a
Third round	12 January 2025	Tamworth v Tottenham Hotspur	12:30	ITVX	ITV1
Third round	12 January 2025	Tamworth v Tottenham Hotspur	12:30	STV Player	STV
Third round	12 January 2025	Arsenal v Manchester United	15:00	BBC iPlayer	BBC One
Third round	12 January 2025	Newcastle United v Bromley	15:00	BBC iPlayer	—N/a
Third round	12 January 2025	Southampton v Swansea City	16:30	BBC iPlayer	BBC Two Wales
Third round	13 January 2025	Millwall v Dagenham & Redbridge	19:30	ITVX	ITV4
Fourth round	7 February 2025	Manchester United v Leicester City	20:00	ITVX	ITV1; UTV
Fourth round	7 February 2025	Manchester United v Leicester City	20:00	STV Player	STV
Fourth round	8 February 2025	Leyton Orient v Manchester City	12:15	BBC iPlayer	BBC One
Fourth round	8 February 2025	Birmingham City v Newcastle United	17:45	BBC iPlayer	BBC One
Fourth round	8 February 2025	Brighton & Hove Albion v Chelsea	20:00	ITVX	ITV4
Fourth round	9 February 2025	Blackburn Rovers v Wolverhampton Wanderers	12:30	BBC iPlayer	—N/a
Fourth round	9 February 2025	Plymouth Argyle v Liverpool	15:00	ITVX	ITV1; UTV
Fourth round	9 February 2025	Plymouth Argyle v Liverpool	15:00	STV Player	STV
Fourth round	9 February 2025	Aston Villa v Tottenham Hotspur	17:35	BBC iPlayer	BBC One
Fourth round	10 February 2025	Doncaster Rovers v Crystal Palace	19:45	BBC iPlayer	—N/a
Fourth round	11 February 2025	Exeter City v Nottingham Forest	20:00	ITVX	ITV1
Fifth round	28 February 2025	Aston Villa v Cardiff City	20:00	ITVX	ITV1
Fifth round	28 February 2025	Aston Villa v Cardiff City	20:00	STV Player	STV
Fifth round	1 March 2025	Crystal Palace v Millwall	12:15	BBC iPlayer	BBC One
Fifth round	1 March 2025	Preston North End v Burnley	12:15	BBC iPlayer	—N/a
Fifth round	1 March 2025	Manchester City v Plymouth Argyle	17:45	ITVX	ITV4
Fifth round	2 March 2025	Newcastle United v Brighton & Hove Albion	13:45	ITVX	ITV1
Fifth round	2 March 2025	Newcastle United v Brighton & Hove Albion	13:45	STV Player	STV
Fifth round	2 March 2025	Manchester United v Fulham	16:30	BBC iPlayer	BBC One
Fifth round	3 March 2025	Nottingham Forest v Ipswich Town	19:30	ITVX	ITV4
Quarter-finals	29 March 2025	Fulham v Crystal Palace	12:15	ITVX	ITV1
Quarter-finals	29 March 2025	Fulham v Crystal Palace	12:15	STV Player	STV
Quarter-finals	29 March 2025	Brighton & Hove Albion v Nottingham Forest	17:15	BBC iPlayer	BBC One
Quarter-finals	30 March 2025	Preston North End v Aston Villa	13:30	BBC iPlayer	BBC One
Quarter-finals	30 March 2025	Bournemouth v Manchester City	16:30	ITVX	ITV1
Quarter-finals	30 March 2025	Bournemouth v Manchester City	16:30	STV Player	STV
Semi-finals	26 April 2025	Crystal Palace v Aston Villa	17:15	BBC iPlayer	BBC One
Semi-finals	27 April 2025	Nottingham Forest v Manchester City	16:30	ITVX	ITV1; UTV
Semi-finals	27 April 2025	Nottingham Forest v Manchester City	16:30	STV Player	STV
Final	17 May 2025	Crystal Palace v Manchester City	16:30	BBC iPlayer	BBC One
Final	17 May 2025	Crystal Palace v Manchester City	16:30	ITVX	ITV1; UTV
Final	17 May 2025	Crystal Palace v Manchester City	16:30	STV Player	STV
