= Will Lancaster =

English footballer (born 2002)

Personal information
- Full name: William Jack Lancaster
- Date of birth: 3 August 2002 (age 24)
- Place of birth: Barnsley, England
- Height: 1.87 m (6 ft 2 in)
- Position: Center back

Team information
- Current team: AFC Fylde

Youth career
- 2012–2021: Barnsley

Senior career*
Years	Team	Apps	(Gls)
2022–	Barnsley	0	(0)
2022	→ Whitby Town (loan)	4	(1)
2022–	→ Bradford Park Avenue (loan)	26	(1)
- * Club domestic league appearances and goals as of 00:00, 12 November 2022 (UTC)

William Jack Lancaster (born 3 August 2002) is an English professional footballer who plays as a Defender for National League club AFC Fylde,

Career

Lancaster entered the academy at Barnsley in June 2010, having been affiliated with the club since the age of seven. He signed as a first-year scholar in July 2018 and made his debut for the under-23 team in August 2019. He turned professional at the club in June 2020. On 5 March 2022, he joined Northern Premier League Premier Division club Whitby Town on loan, having impressed Barnsley youth-team coach Martin Devaney. He played three games as a substitute. He signed an extended contract at Barnsley in July 2022.

He made his first-team debut on 20 September 2022, coming on for Nicky Cadden as a half-time substitute in a 2–0 win over Newcastle United U21 in an EFL Trophy group stage game at Oakwell. On 4 November 2022, he joined National League North club Bradford Park Avenue a loan deal.

== Style of play ==
Lancaster is a Center Back described by Barnsley as "renowned for his tireless and industrial approach to the game... often deployed at the base of the diamond, his combative style of play is complimented [sic] by an ability to seamlessly transition defence to attack with a fine range of passing skills".

== Career statistics ==
As of match played 12 November 2022

Appearances and goals by club, season and competition
Club	Season	League			FA Cup		EFL Cup		Other		Total	
Club	Season	Division	Apps	Goals	Apps	Goals	Apps	Goals	Apps	Goals	Apps	Goals
Barnsley	2022–23	EFL League One	0	0	0	0	0	0	2 (Note: Appearance(s) in the EFL Trophy)	0	2	0
Whitby Town (loan)	2022–23	Northern Premier League; Premier Division	4	0	0	0	0	0	0	0	4	0
Bradford Park Avenue (loan)	2022–23	National League North	24	0	0	0	0	0	0	0	24	1
Career total			28	0	0	0	0	0	2	0	30	1
