= Evandro (footballer, born 1986) =

Brazilian footballer

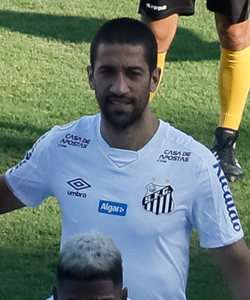
- Evandro with Santos in 2019

Personal information
- Full name: Evandro Goebel
- Date of birth: 23 August 1986 (age 40)
- Place of birth: Blumenau, Brazil
- Height: 1.79 m (5 ft 10 in)
- Position: Attacking midfielder

Youth career
- 2000–2004: Atlético Paranaense

Senior career*
Years	Team	Apps	(Gls)
2005–2010	Atlético Paranaense	92	(13)
2008	→ Goiás (loan)	18	(7)
2008–2009	→ Palmeiras (loan)	38	(2)
2009–2010	→ Atlético Mineiro (loan)	37	(3)
2010	→ Vitória (loan)	7	(1)
2011–2012	Red Star	35	(13)
2012–2014	Estoril	53	(14)
2014–2017	Porto	34	(2)
2017–2019	Hull City	42	(4)
2019–2020	Santos	21	(1)
2020–2021	Chapecoense	7	(0)
Total		382	(60)

International career
2005	Brazil U20	14	(4)
- * Club domestic league appearances and goals

Evandro Goebel (born 23 August 1986), known as Evandro, is a Brazilian former professional footballer who played as an attacking midfielder. He also held Serbian citizenship.

Over seven seasons, he amassed Série A totals of 144 matches and 12 goals, representing six clubs. He also competed professionally in Serbia, Portugal and England.

== Club career ==
=== Atlético Paranaense ===
Born in Blumenau, Santa Catarina, Evandro made his professional debut for Atlético Paranaense against Malutrom, in a 3–1 win for the Campeonato Paranaense on 10 February 2005. He scored his first goal on 1 June, helping to a 3–2 victory over Santos in the Copa Libertadores.

During his five-year tenure at the Arena da Baixada, Evandro was also loaned to Goiás, Palmeiras and Atlético Mineiro. On 25 May 2010, still owned by Atlético, he signed alongside teammate Renan Oliveira with Vitória, in exchange for Neto Berola.

=== Red Star ===
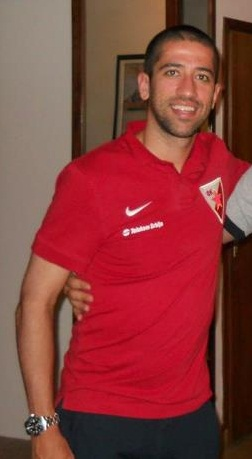
Evandro with Red Star in 2011

Evandro joined Serbian club Red Star Belgrade on 1 December 2010, on a three-and-a-half-year contract. In order to reduce the number of foreigners in the squad, a Serbian passport was requested for him, and the following July the Serbian government approved the move and he officially became a national of the country.

On 16 May 2012, Evandro scored the opening goal in the final of the Serbian Cup, a 2–0 defeat of FK Borac Čačak. On 22 August, however, he terminated his contract immediately prior to the second leg of the UEFA Europa League's play-off round against FC Girondins de Bordeaux, saying to a journalist at Belgrade's airport: "I can't play for Red Star any more. I train, I play games, and there is no money. I can't do it any longer, I have to think about my family. I am not mad at anyone. I loved Belgrade and Serbia. I played the best I could, I don't think Red Star was a mistake."

=== Estoril ===
Evandro moved to Portugal with G.D. Estoril Praia in the summer of 2012. He made his Primeira Liga debut on 29 September, coming on as a late substitute in a 2–2 draw at Sporting CP.

On 27 January 2013, Evandro's successful strike during a 3–3 home draw to S.C. Olhanense received widespread media coverage. He finished his second season with a career-best 11 goals, as his team finished fourth and qualified to the Europa League.

=== Porto ===
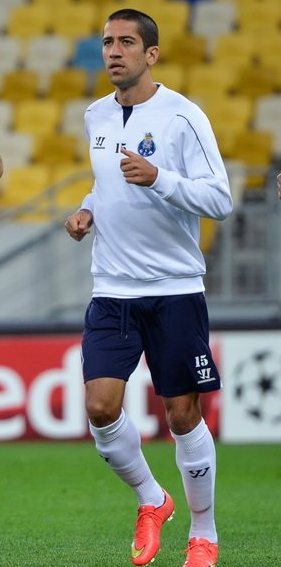
Evandro training with Porto in 2014

Evandro signed with FC Porto for the 2014–15 campaign. He appeared in 33 competitive matches in his first year, but only four in the first half of 2016–17 after the arrival of new manager Nuno Espírito Santo.

=== Hull City ===
On 13 January 2017, Evandro signed a 2 1/2-year deal with Hull City. He made his Premier League debut the following day, replacing Robert Snodgrass for the last 14 minutes of a 3–1 home win against AFC Bournemouth. He scored his first goal for his new team on 29 January, but in a 1–4 away loss to Fulham in the fourth round of the FA Cup.

Evandro left the KCOM Stadium at the end of the 2018–19 season.

=== Santos ===
On 1 July 2019, Evandro returned to Brazil after nearly nine years, and agreed to a one-year contract at Santos. He made his debut for the club on 4 August, replacing Felipe Jonatan in a 6–1 home rout of former side Goiás.

Evandro scored his first goal for Peixe on 1 December 2019, the second of a 2–0 home defeat of Chapecoensel. The following 9 June, after falling down the pecking order under new manager Jesualdo Ferreira, it was announced that his contract would not be renewed.

=== Chapecoense ===
On 11 September 2020, Evandro was announced at Campeonato Brasileiro Série B's Chapecoense. On 26 February 2021, shortly after winning the league (a first-ever national honour for the club), he announced his retirement.

== International career ==
Evandro was part of the Brazil under-20 team at the 2005 FIFA World Youth Championship held in the Netherlands, contributing six scoreless appearances for the eventual third-placed nation.

== Personal life ==
Evandro's father, Osmair, was also a footballer.

== Career statistics ==
Appearances and goals by club, season and competition
Club	Season	League			State League		Cup		Continental		Other		Total	
Club	Season	Division	Apps	Goals	Apps	Goals	Apps	Goals	Apps	Goals	Apps	Goals	Apps	Goals
Atlético Paranaense	2005	Série A	28	4	7	0	—		7 (Note: Appearance(s) in Copa Libertadores)	1	—		42	5
Atlético Paranaense	2006	Série A	16	2	6	0	1	0	0	0	—		23	2
Atlético Paranaense	2007	Série A	15	1	20	6	7	1	1 (Note: Appearance(s) in Copa Sudamericana)	0	—		42	8
Atlético Paranaense	Total		59	7	33	6	8	1	8	1	—		107	15
Goiás (loan)	2008	Série A	3	0	15	7	4	1	—		—		22	8
Palmeiras (loan)	2008	Série A	27	0	—		—		4	0	—		31	0
Palmeiras (loan)	2009	Série A	0	0	11	2	—		4	0	—		15	2
Palmeiras (loan)	Total		27	0	11	2	—		8	0	—		46	2
Atlético Mineiro (loan)	2009	Série A	28	3	—		—		—		—		28	3
Atlético Mineiro (loan)	2010	Série A	2	0	7	0	3	0	—		—		12	0
Atlético Mineiro (loan)	Total		30	3	7	0	3	0	—		—		40	3
Vitória (loan)	2010	Série A	7	1	—		—		0	0	—		7	1
Red Star Belgrade	2010–11	Serbian SuperLiga	9	5	—		2	0	—		—		11	5
Red Star Belgrade	2011–12	Serbian SuperLiga	25	8	—		6	3	2 (Note: Appearance(s) in UEFA Europa League)	0	—		33	11
Red Star Belgrade	2012–13	Serbian SuperLiga	1	0	—		0	0	4	0	—		5	0
Red Star Belgrade	Total		35	13	—		8	3	6	0	—		49	16
Estoril	2012–13	Primeira Liga	25	3	—		0	0	—		4 (Note: Appearance(s) in Taça da Liga)	0	29	3
Estoril	2013–14	Primeira Liga	28	11	—		2	0	10	2	2	0	42	13
Estoril	Total		53	14	—		2	0	10	2	6	0	71	16
Porto	2014–15	Primeira Liga	21	1	—		0	0	7 (Note: Appearance(s) in UEFA Champions League)	0	5	4	33	5
Porto	2015–16	Primeira Liga	11	1	—		4	0	4 (Note: Two appearances in UEFA Champions League, two appearances in UEFA Europa League)	0	1	0	20	1
Porto	2016–17	Primeira Liga	0	0	—		1	0	2	0	1	0	4	0
Porto	Total		32	2	—		5	0	13	0	7	4	57	6
Hull City	2016–17	Premier League	11	0	—		1	1	—		1 (Note: Appearance(s) in EFL Cup)	0	13	1
Hull City	2017–18	Championship	8	1	—		2	0	—		0	0	10	1
Hull City	2018–19	Championship	23	3	—		0	0	—		0	0	23	3
Hull City	Total		42	4	—		3	1	—		1	0	46	5
Santos	2019	Série A	18	1	—		—		—		—		18	1
Santos	2020	Série A	0	0	3	0	0	0	2	0	—		5	0
Santos	Total		18	1	3	0	0	0	2	0	—		23	1
Chapecoense	2020	Série B	7	0	—		—		0	0	—		7	0
Career total			313	45	69	15	33	6	47	3	14	4	475	73

== Honours ==
Atlético Paranaense

- Campeonato Paranaense: 2005

Red Star Belgrade

- Serbian Cup: 2011–12

Chapecoense

- Campeonato Brasileiro Série B: 2020

Brazil U20

- FIFA World Youth Championship third place: 2005

Individual

- Serbian SuperLiga Team of the Year: 2010–11
