= Keane Lewis-Potter =

English footballer (born 2001)

- Lewis-Potter with Brentford in 2025

Personal information
- Full name: Keane William Lewis-Potter
- Date of birth: 22 February 2001 (age 25)
- Place of birth: Kingston upon Hull, England
- Height: 5 ft 7 in (1.70 m)
- Positions: Winger; left-back; left wing-back

Team information
- Current team: Brentford
- Number: 23

Youth career
- 2015–2019: Hull City

Senior career*
Years	Team	Apps	(Gls)
2019–2022	Hull City	110	(27)
2019	→ Bradford (Park Avenue) (loan)	5	(0)
2022–	Brentford	121	(9)

International career
2022	England U21	4	(1)
- * Club domestic league appearances and goals as of 23:58, 17 October 2026 (UTC)

Keane William Lewis-Potter (born 22 February 2001) is an English professional footballer who plays primarily as a winger, left-back or left wing-back for Premier League club Brentford.

== Club career ==
=== Hull City ===
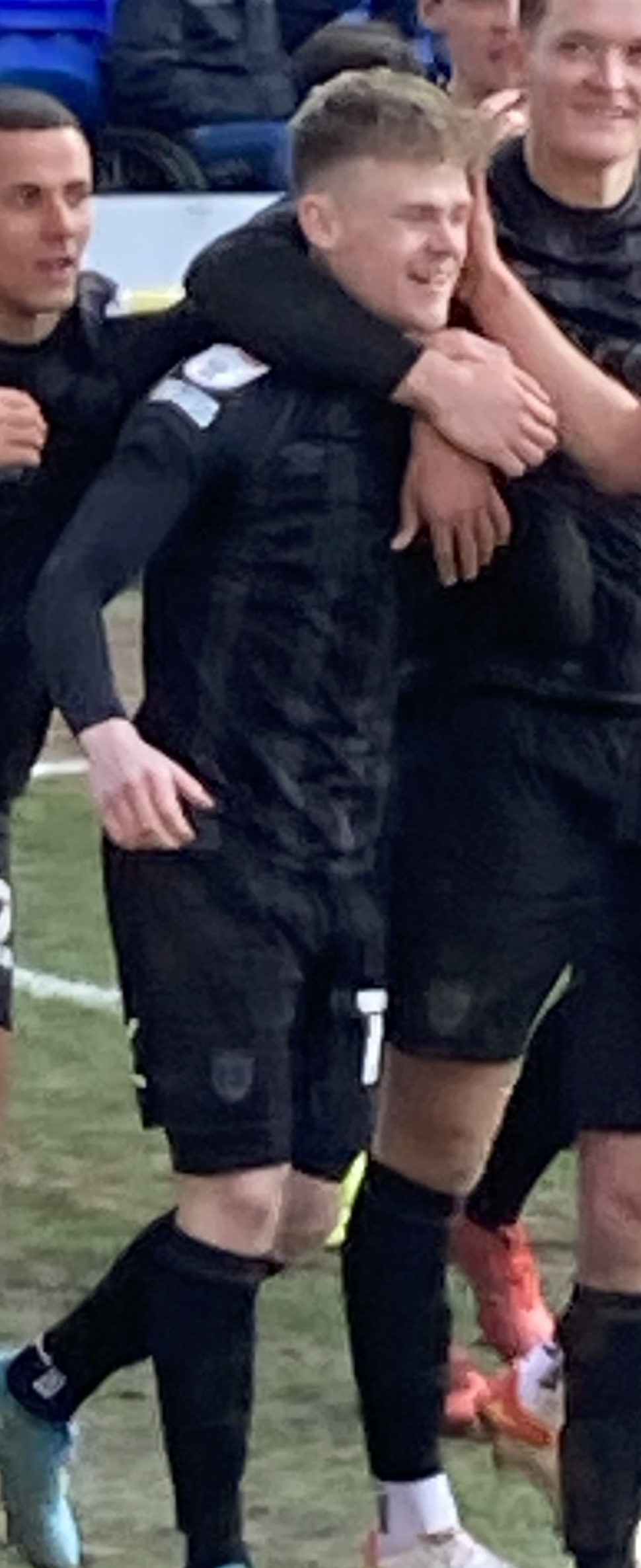
Lewis-Potter playing for Hull City in 2022

Lewis-Potter made his senior debut for Hull City in January 2019 when he came on as a substitute in an FA Cup match against Millwall. In March 2019, Lewis-Potter went on loan to Bradford (Park Avenue) for the remainder of the 2018–19 season.

On 9 November 2019, Lewis-Potter made his league debut for Hull City when he came on as an 89th-minute substitute for Leonardo Lopes in the 1–0 home loss to West Bromwich Albion. On 30 November 2019, he came on as a substitute for Callum Elder and scored the only Hull goal and his first professional goal in a 3–1 defeat to Barnsley.

On 18 January 2021, Lewis-Potter signed a new contract with Hull City until summer 2023.

On 3 May 2022, Lewis-Potter was awarded three player of the season awards for Hull City; the players player of the season, fans player of the season and the player of the season chosen by Hull City manager Shota Arveladze.

=== Brentford ===
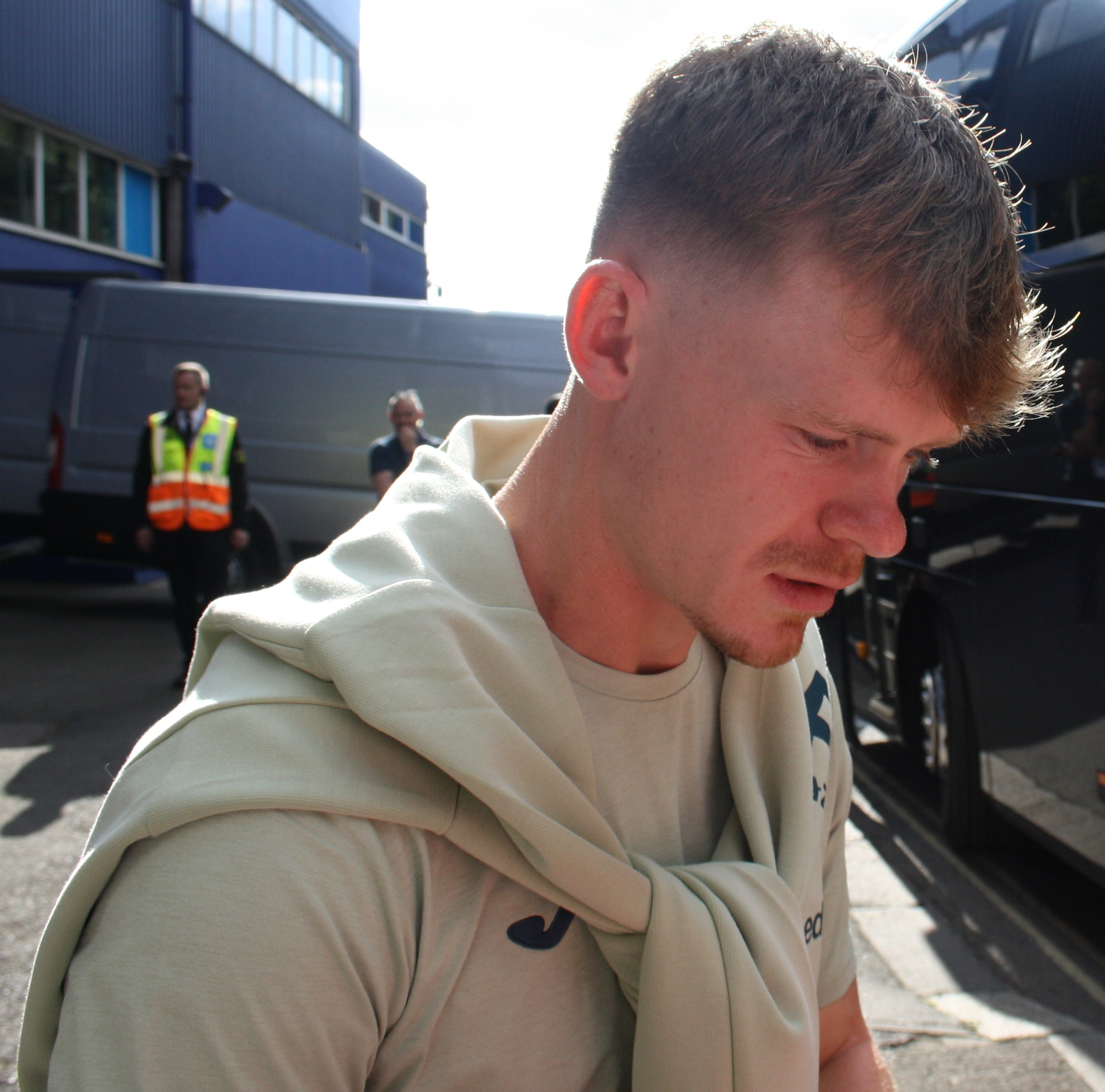
Lewis-Potter signing autographs after a match in August 2025

On 12 July 2022, Premier League club Brentford announced the signing of Lewis-Potter on a six-year contract, for an undisclosed fee. He scored his first top-flight goal at home to Aston Villa on 17 December 2023. Due to injuries to most of Brentford's full-backs, Lewis-Potter played as a left back for the majority of the 2024–25 season.

== International career ==
In March 2022, Lewis-Potter received a first international call-up to the England under-21 squad for the upcoming 2023 UEFA European Under-21 Championship qualification fixtures. He made his debut when coming on as an 82nd-minute substitute for Noni Madueke against Albania.

== Personal life ==
Lewis-Potter attended St Mary's College, Hull.

== Career statistics ==
As of match played 17 October 2026

Appearances and goals by club, season and competition
Club	Season	League			FA Cup		EFL Cup		Other		Total	
Club	Season	Division	Apps	Goals	Apps	Goals	Apps	Goals	Apps	Goals	Apps	Goals
Hull City	2018–19	Championship	0	0	1	0	0	0	—		1	0
Hull City	2019–20	Championship	21	2	1	0	0	0	—		22	2
Hull City	2020–21	League One	43	13	2	0	3	0	3 (Note: Appearances in EFL Trophy)	2	51	15
Hull City	2021–22	Championship	46	12	1	0	1	1	—		48	13
Hull City	Total		110	27	5	0	4	1	3	2	122	30
Bradford (Park Avenue) (loan)	2018–19	National League North	5	0	—		—		—		5	0
Brentford	2022–23	Premier League	10	0	1	0	2	1	—		13	1
Brentford	2023–24	Premier League	30	3	2	0	2	0	—		34	3
Brentford	2024–25	Premier League	38	1	1	0	4	1	—		43	2
Brentford	2025–26	Premier League	36	3	3	1	2	1	—		41	5
Brentford	2026–27	Premier League	7	2	0	0	2	0	—		9	2
Brentford	Total		121	9	7	1	12	3	—		140	13
Career total			236	36	12	1	16	4	3	2	267	43

== Honours ==
Hull City

- EFL League One: 2020–21

Individual

- EFL Young Player of the Month: September 2020
- Hull City Player of the Year: 2021–22
- Hull City Players' Player of the Year: 2021–22
- Hull City Supporters' Player of the Year: 2021–22
