= 2021–22 Hull City A.F.C. season =

English football club season

Hull City
2021–22 season
- Owner: Assem Allam (until 19 January 2022); Acun Medya (from 19 January 2022)
- Chairman: Assem Allam (until 19 January 2022); Acun Ilıcalı (from 19 January 2022)
- Manager: Grant McCann (until 25 January 2022); Shota Arveladze (from 27 January 2022)
- Stadium: MKM Stadium
- Championship: 19th
- FA Cup: Third round
- EFL Cup: First round
- Top goalscorer: League: Keane Lewis-Potter (12); All: Keane Lewis-Potter (13)
- Highest home attendance: 18,399 (v Nottingham Forest, 7 May)
- Lowest home attendance: 10,189 (v Blackpool, 28 September)
- Average home league attendance: 12,888
Home colours	Away colours	Third colours
- All statistics correct as of 7 May 2022.

The 2021–22 season is Hull City Association Football Club's 118th year in their history and first season back in the Championship since 2019–20 following promotion last season. Along with the league, the club will also compete in the FA Cup and the EFL Cup. The season covers the period from 1 July 2021 to 30 June 2022.

== Events ==
- On 25 June 2021, the club announced that local based building supplies firm MKM Building Supplies Ltd. had agreed a 5-year sponsorship deal for the stadium and it was being renamed the MKM Stadium.
- On 1 July 2021, Martin Samuelsen signed a permanent deal with Norwegian side FK Haugesund for an undisclosed fee.
- On 7 July 2021, Ryan Longman of Brighton & Hove Albion joined the club on a season-long loan.
- On 8 July 2021, the EFL announced that the club were under a transfer embargo for "conditions under monitored loan agreement" which was arranged because of the COVID-19 pandemic. The club later issued a statement to clarify the position.
- On 9 July 2021, Billy Chadwick moved to Linfield on loan until January 2022, while Ahmed Salam also went on a season-long loan to Linfield.
- On 13 July 2021, Tom Nixon joined the Academy from Stoke City on a one-year deal.
- On 30 July 2021, Di'Shon Bernard of Manchester United signed a season-long loan deal with the club.
- On 5 August 2021, James Berry signed for Altrincham on a free transfer.
- On 6 August 2021, the club released Jordan Flores from his contract, so he could join Northampton Town permanently, rather than play there on a season-long loan deal.
- On 6 August 2021, Festus Arthur joined Barrow on a season-long loan deal.
- On 6 August 2021, Matt Smith joined the club on a season-long loan spell from Manchester City.
- On 16 August 2021, Thomas Mayer was released from his contract and moved to SKU Amstetten.
- On 17 August 2021, Tom Huddlestone returned to Hull City on a year-long contract.
- On 20 August 2021, Matty Jacob moved to Gateshead on loan until January 2022, but was switched to a season-long loan in January 2022.
- On 20 August 2021, James Scott went to Hibernian on a season-long loan.
- On 27 August 2021, Tyler Smith, of Sheffield United, signed a two-year deal with the club for an undisclosed fee.
- On 28 August 2021, Jake Leake joined Boston United on a month-long loan spell, this was later extended for a further month.
- On 30 August 2021, Andy Smith moved to Salford City on a season-long loan.
- On 31 August 2021, Harry Wood moved to Scunthorpe United on a season-long loan.
- On 18 September 2021, Harvey Cartwright joined Gainsborough Trinity on a month-long loan spell.
- On 20 September 2021, Billy Clarke joined the club as under-18's assistant manager.
- On 7 October 2021, Jevon Mills signed a two-year deal with the club.
- On 13 October 2021, the club announced that they had agreed a year extension to their deal with kit suppliers, Umbro.
- On 19 November 2021, Harry Fisk and Josh Hinds moved to Spalding United on a month-long loan.
- On 24 November 2021, Billy Chadwick returned from his loan spell at Linfield because of an anterior cruciate ligament knee injury.
- On 14 December 2021, Harry Lovick joined Pickering Town on a month-long loan spell.
- On 17 December 2021, Louis Beckett joined Ossett United on a month-long loan spell.
- On 17 December 2021, McCauley Snelgrove joined Cleethorpes Town on a month-long loan spell, this was later extended for a further month.
- On 23 December 2021, Jake Leake rejoined Boston United on a month-long loan spell.
- On 30 December 2021, Josh Hinds was recalled from his loan at Spalding United because of a number of Hull City players affected by COVID-19.
- On 13 January 2022, Josh Magennis joined Wigan Athletic on a two-and-a-half-year deal, for an undisclosed fee.
- On 14 January 2022, Andy Smith was recalled from Salford City and immediately loaned to Grimsby Town for the remainder of the season.
- On 18 January 2022, Callum Jones and Festus Arthur were recalled from their loan spells at Morecambe and Barrow respectively.
- On 19 January 2022, ahead of the match against Blackburn Rovers, the club announced that Acun Medya, backed by Acun Ilıcalı, had purchased the club from Assem Allam.
- On 25 January 2022, it was announced that Grant McCann and Cliff Byrne would be leaving the club.
- On 26 January 2022, it was announced that the club had repaid the EFL loan taken out because of the COVID-19 pandemic and thus the transfer embargo has been lifted.
- On 27 January 2022, Regan Slater of Sheffield United returned to the club after signing a two-and-a-half-year deal for an undisclosed fee.
- On 27 January 2022, Jevon Mills joined Falkirk on loan until the end of the season.
- On 27 January 2022, Will Jarvis joined York City on a month-long loan.
- On 27 January 2022, Shota Arveladze was announced as the new head coach of the club, on a two-and-a-half-year deal. The vice-chairman of the club was Tan Kesler.
- On 31 January 2022, Matt Smith was recalled by Manchester City.
- On 31 January 2022, Harry Wood was recalled from his loan at Scunthorpe United.
- On 31 January 2022, Allahyar Sayyadmanesh joined from Fenerbahçe on loan until the end of the season.
- On 31 January 2022, Ryan Longman signed a three-and-a-half-year deal for an undisclosed fee, converting his loan from Brighton & Hove Albion into a permanent deal.
- On 31 January 2022, Marcus Forss joined the club on loan from Brentford until the end of the season.
- On 31 January 2022, Liam Walsh joined the club on loan from Swansea City until the end of the season.
- On 11 February 2022, Peter van der Veen joined as assistant head coach.
- On 15 February 2022, James Rodwell was appointed as CEO of the club.
- On 5 March 2022, the East Stand of the MKM Stadium was renamed the Chris Chilton Stand, in honour of Hull City's all-time record goalscorer, Chris Chilton, ahead of the home fixture against West Bromwich Albion.
- On 5 March 2022, Callum Jones moved to Grimsby Town on a month-long loan spell, but on 20 March 2022, he returned to Hull following a groin injury that ruled him out for the rest of the season.
- On 11 March 2022, Louis Beckett joined Bridlington Town on a month-long loan spell.
- On 16 March 2022, Oliver Green joined Bridlington Town on a month-long loan spell.
- On 18 March 2022, Will Jarvis joined Scarborough Athletic on loan until the end of the season.
- On 18 March 2022, Josh Hinds joined Gainsborough Trinity on a month-long loan spell.
- On 22 March 2022, McCauley Snelgrove rejoined Cleethorpes Town on loan until the end of the season.
- On 22 March 2022, Rio Dyer joined Cinderford Town on work experience until the end of the season.
- On 24 March 2022, Tom Nixon joined Pickering Town on loan until the end of the season.
- On 24 March 2022, Andy Cannon joined Stockport County on loan until the end of the season.
- On 25 March 2022, David Robson joined Farsley Celtic on loan until the end of the season.
- On 26 March 2022, Sam Deacon joined Hall Road Rangers on loan until the end of the season.
- On 29 March 2022, Henry Curtis joined Hall Road Rangers on work experience until the end of the season.
- On 1 May 2022, Matt Ingram joined Luton Town on an emergency seven-day loan to cover for James Shea who suffered a knee injury in the game against Cardiff City, with Luton reaching the play-offs the loan was extended to 18 May.
- On 7 May 2022, Tony Pennock stepped down from the coaching staff after 8-years with the club.
- On 13 May 2022, Andy Dawson was promoted from the Academy Coaching Staff to first team coach following the departure of Tony Pennock.

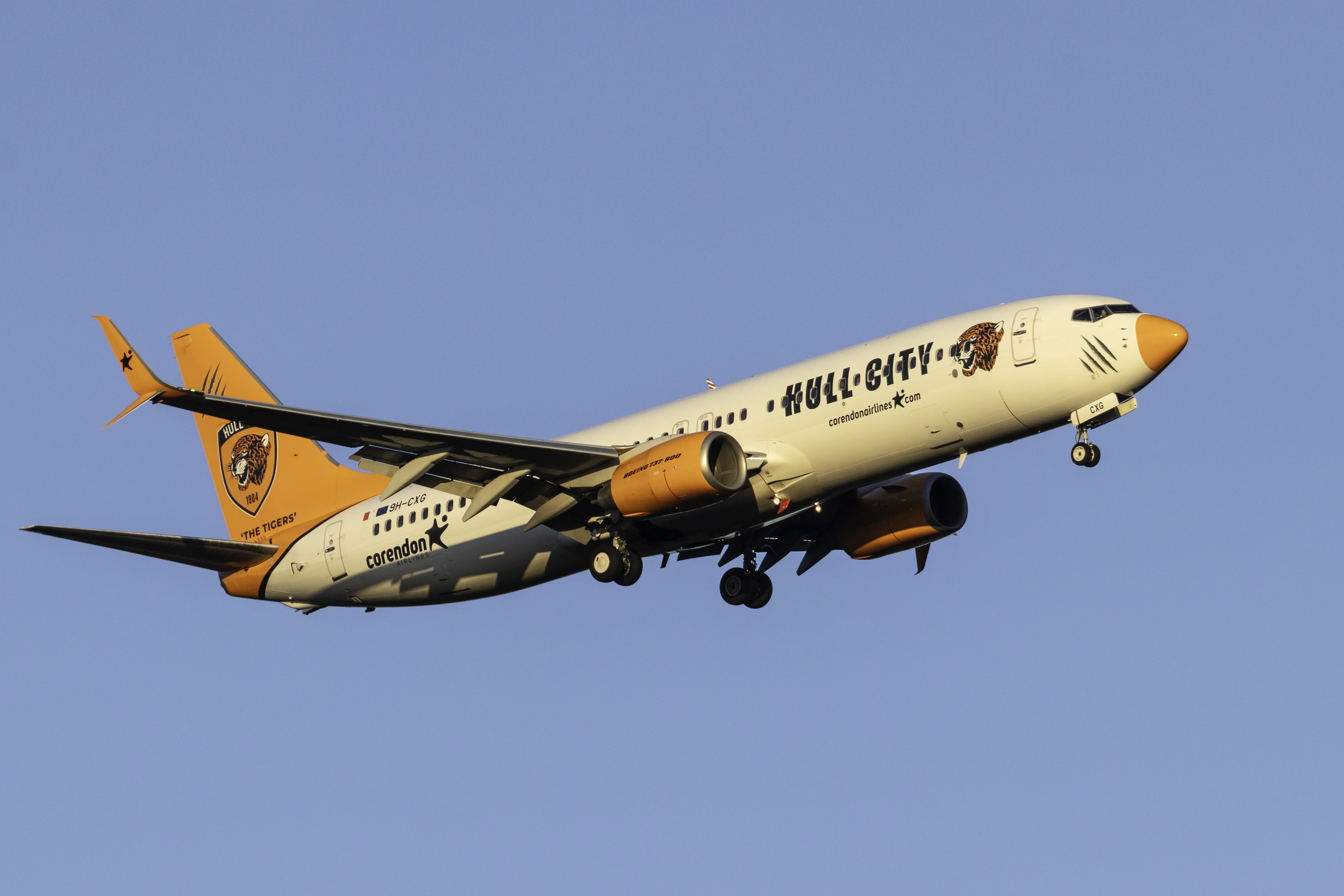
Corendon Airlines plane in Hull City strip

- On 13 May 2022, the club announced Corendon Airlines as the club's first-ever official travel partner.
- On 18 May 2022, the club indicated they would not take-up the options of a further year on contracts of Tom Eaves, Tom Huddlestone and Richard Smallwood. Options for an additional year have been exercised on the contracts of Matt Ingram, Callum Elder, Josh Emmanuel, George Honeyman and Mallik Wilks.
- On 25 May 2022, Harvey Cartwright signed a four-year deal with the club.
- On 16 June 2022, Matt Ingram signed a new three-year contract, with the club holding an option for a further year.

== Squad ==
#	Name	Position	Nationality	Place of birth	Date of birth (age) (Note: Players' ages listed as they were on 1 July 2021, the official start date of the 2021–22 season)	Previous club	Date signed	Fee (Note: All fees converted into GBP)
Goalkeepers
1	Matt Ingram	GK	(England)	High Wycombe	18 December 1993 (age 27)	Queens Park Rangers	1 July 2019	Free
13	Nathan Baxter	GK	(England)	Westminster	8 November 1998 (age 22)	Chelsea	25 June 2021	Loan
32	Harvey Cartwright	GK	(England)	Grimsby	9 May 2002 (age 19)	Academy	23 December 2019	—
Defenders
2	Lewie Coyle	RB	(England)	Hull	15 October 1995 (age 25)	Fleetwood Town	7 August 2020	£350,000
3	Callum Elder	LB	(Australia)	Sydney	27 January 1995 (age 26)	Leicester City	8 August 2019	£225,000
4	Jacob Greaves	CB	(England)	Cottingham	12 September 2000 (age 20)	Academy	1 July 2020	—
5	Alfie Jones	CB	(England)	Bristol	7 October 1997 (age 23)	Southampton	4 September 2020	Undisclosed
12	Josh Emmanuel	RB	(England)	London	18 August 1997 (age 23)	Bolton Wanderers	7 August 2020	Free
17	Sean McLoughlin	CB	(Republic of Ireland)	Cork	13 September 1996 (age 24)	(Republic of Ireland) Cork City	26 July 2019	£225,000
21	Brandon Fleming	LB	(England)	Hull	3 December 1999 (age 21)	Academy	1 July 2019	—
24	Di'Shon Bernard	CB	(England)	Wandsworth	14 October 2000 (age 20)	Manchester United	30 July 2021	Loan
25	Festus Arthur	CB	(Ghana)	(Germany) Hamburg	27 February 2000 (age 21)	Stockport County	2 July 2020	£50,000
Midfielders
6	Richie Smallwood (c)	DM	(England)	Redcar	29 December 1990 (age 30)	Blackburn Rovers	11 August 2020	Free
8	Greg Docherty	CM	(Scotland)	Milngavie	10 September 1996 (age 24)	(Scotland) Rangers	20 August 2020	£400,000
10	George Honeyman	AM	(England)	Prudhoe	8 September 1994 (age 26)	Sunderland	2 August 2019	£400,000
18	George Moncur	CM	(England)	Swindon	18 August 1993 (age 27)	Luton Town	7 June 2021	Free
23	Tom Huddlestone	CM	(England)	Nottingham	28 December 1986 (age 34)	Derby County	17 August 2021	Free
27	Regan Slater	CM	(England)	Gleadless	11 September 1999 (age 21)	Sheffield United	27 January 2022	£50,000
28	Callum Jones	CM	(Wales)	(England) Birkenhead	5 April 2001 (age 20)	Bury	20 August 2019	Youth Fee
45	Liam Walsh	CM	(England)	Huyton	15 September 1997 (age 23)	Swansea City	31 January 2022	Loan
Forwards
7	Mallik Wilks	RW	(England)	Leeds	15 December 1998 (age 22)	Barnsley	2 July 2020	Undisclosed
9	Tom Eaves	CF	(England)	Liverpool	14 January 1992 (age 29)	Gillingham	10 July 2019	Free
11	Keane Lewis-Potter	LW	(England)	Hull	22 February 2001 (age 20)	Academy	25 February 2018	—
16	Ryan Longman	RW	(England)	Redhill	6 November 2000 (age 20)	Brighton & Hove Albion	31 January 2022	£800,000
19	Randell Williams	RW	(England)	Lambeth	30 December 1996 (age 24)	Exeter City	17 June 2021	Free
20	Allahyar Sayyadmanesh	CF	(Iran)	Amol	29 June 2001 (age 20)	(Turkey) Fenerbahçe	31 January 2022	Loan
22	Tyler Smith	CF	(England)	Sheffield	4 December 1998 (age 22)	Sheffield United	27 August 2021	Free
44	Marcus Forss	CF	(Finland)	Turku	18 June 1999 (age 22)	Brentford	31 January 2022	Loan

=== Out on loan ===
#	Name	Position	Nationality	Place of birth	Date of birth (age)	Previous club	Date signed	Fee
14	Andy Cannon	CM	(England)	Ashton-under-Lyne	14 March 1996 (age 25)	Portsmouth	16 June 2021	Free
15	James Scott	CF	(Scotland)	Glasgow	30 August 2000 (age 20)	(Scotland) Motherwell	31 January 2020	£1,500,000
26	Andy Smith	CB	(England)	Banbury	11 September 2001 (age 19)	Academy	1 July 2021	—
29	Matty Jacob	LB	(England)	Barnsley	3 June 2001 (age 20)	Academy	1 July 2019	—
36	Will Jarvis	RW	(England)	York	17 December 2002 (age 18)	Academy	1 July 2021	—
37	David Robson	GK	(Wales)	(England) Northallerton	22 January 2002 (age 19)	Academy	23 December 2019	—

== Transfers ==
=== Transfers in ===
Date	Position	Nationality	Name	From	Fee	Ref.
1 July 2021	CM	(England)	Andy Cannon	(England) Portsmouth	Free transfer	
1 July 2021	CM	(England)	George Moncur	(England) Luton Town	Free transfer	
1 July 2021	RM	(England)	Randell Williams	(England) Exeter City	Free transfer	
13 July 2021	RB	(England)	Tom Nixon	(England) Stoke City	Free transfer	
17 August 2021	DM	(England)	Tom Huddlestone	Free agent	—N/a	
27 August 2021	CF	(England)	Tyler Smith	(England) Sheffield United	Undisclosed	
27 January 2022	DM	(England)	Regan Slater	(England) Sheffield United	Undisclosed	
31 January 2022	RW	(England)	Ryan Longman	(England) Brighton & Hove Albion	Undisclosed	

=== Loans in ===
Date from	Position	Nationality	Name	From	Date until	Ref.
1 July 2021	GK	(England)	Nathan Baxter	(England) Chelsea	End of season	
7 July 2021	RW	(England)	Ryan Longman	(England) Brighton & Hove Albion	31 January 2022 (Note: On 31 January 2022, Ryan Longman signed a permanent deal with Hull City.)	
30 July 2021	CB	(England)	Di'Shon Bernard	(England) Manchester United	End of season	
6 August 2021	DM	(Wales)	Matt Smith	(England) Manchester City	31 January 2022 (Note: On 31 January 2022, Matt Smith was recalled by Manchester City.)	
31 January 2022	CF	(Iran)	Allahyar Sayyadmanesh	(Turkey) Fenerbahçe	End of season	
31 January 2022	FW	(Finland)	Marcus Forss	(England) Brentford	End of season	
31 January 2022	MF	(England)	Liam Walsh	(Wales) Swansea City	End of season	

=== Transfers out ===
Date	Position	Nationality	Name	To	Fee	Ref.
13 May 2021	CB	(Netherlands)	Jordy de Wijs	(England) Queens Park Rangers	Undisclosed	
30 June 2021	CM	(Guyana)	Elliot Bonds	(England) Cheltenham Town	Free transfer	
30 June 2021	CB	(England)	Reece Burke	(England) Luton Town	Free transfer	
30 June 2021	MF	(England)	Harvey Carew	Unattached	Released	
30 June 2021	LB	(England)	Max Clark	(England) Fleetwood Town	Released	
30 June 2021	GK	(England)	Harrison Foulkes	(England) Derby County	Released	
30 June 2021	MF	(England)	Ryan Hanson	(England) Dover Athletic	Released	
30 June 2021	GK	(England)	George Long	(England) Millwall	Free transfer	
30 June 2021	CB	(Belgium)	Danny Lupano	Unattached	Released	
30 June 2021	MF	(Wales)	McCauley Power	Unattached	Released	
30 June 2021	FW	(England)	Luke Rees	Unattached	Released	
30 June 2021	AM	(England)	Max Sheaf	Unattached	Released	
30 June 2021	DF	(England)	Josh Ward	Unattached	Released	
1 July 2021	MF	(Norway)	Martin Samuelsen	(Norway) FK Haugesund	Undisclosed	
5 August 2021	MF	(England)	James Berry-McNally	(England) Altrincham	Free transfer	
6 August 2021	CM	(England)	Jordan Flores	(England) Northampton Town	Free transfer	
16 August 2021	RW	(Austria)	Thomas Mayer	(Austria) SKU Amstetten	Released	
13 January 2022	CF	(Northern Ireland)	Josh Magennis	(England) Wigan Athletic	Undisclosed	

=== Loans out ===
Date from	Position	Nationality	Name	To	Date until	Ref.
1 July 2021	CM	(England)	Jordan Flores	(England) Northampton Town	6 August 2021	(Note: Jordan Flores was later released from his contract and joined Northampton Town permanently.)
1 July 2021	AM	(Wales)	Callum Jones	(England) Morecambe	18 January 2022 (Note: On 18 January 2022, Jones was recalled back from his loan spell at Morecambe.)	
9 July 2021	FW	(England)	Billy Chadwick	(Northern Ireland) Linfield	24 November 2021	
9 July 2021	MF	(England)	Ahmed Salam	(Northern Ireland) Linfield	End of season	
6 August 2021	CB	(Germany)	Festus Arthur	(England) Barrow	18 January 2022 (Note: On 18 January 2022, Arthur was recalled back from his loan spell at Barrow.)	
20 August 2021	LB	(England)	Matty Jacob	(England) Gateshead	End of season	
20 August 2021	CF	(Scotland)	James Scott	(Scotland) Hibernian	End of season	
28 August 2021	DF	(England)	Jake Leake	(England) Boston United	October 2021	
30 August 2021	CB	(England)	Andy Smith	(England) Salford City	14 January 2022 (Note: On 14 January 2022, Andy Smith was recalled back from his loan at Salford City.)	
31 August 2021	MF	(England)	Harry Wood	(England) Scunthorpe United	31 January 2022 (Note: On 31 January 2022, Harry Wood was recalled back from his loan at Scunthorpe United.)	
18 September 2021	GK	(England)	Harvey Cartwright	(England) Gainsborough Trinity	18 October 2021	
2 October 2021	GK	(England)	Tom Macauley	(England) Hall Road Rangers	Work experience	
19 November 2021	GK	(England)	Harry Fisk	(England) Spalding United	December 2021	
19 November 2021	FW	(England)	Josh Hinds	(England) Spalding United	30 December 2021	(Note: On 30 December 2021, Hinds was recalled from his loan at Spalding United.)
14 December 2021	MF	(England)	Harry Lovick	(England) Pickering Town	January 2022	
17 December 2021	MF	(England)	Louis Beckett	(England) Ossett United	January 2022	
17 December 2021	FW	(England)	McCauley Snelgrove	(England) Cleethorpes Town	February 2022	
23 December 2021	LB	(England)	Jake Leake	(England) Boston United	January 2022	
14 January 2022	CB	(England)	Andy Smith	(England) Grimsby Town	End of season	
27 January 2022	CB	(Republic of Ireland)	Jevon Mills	(Scotland) Falkirk	End of season	
27 January 2022	FW	(England)	Will Jarvis	(England) York City	27 February 2022	
5 March 2022	AM	(Wales)	Callum Jones	(England) Grimsby Town	20 March 2022 (Note: On 20 March 2022, Jones returned to Hull following a groin injury that ruled him out for the rest of the season.)	
11 March 2022	MF	(England)	Louis Beckett	(England) Bridlington Town	April 2022	
16 March 2022	MF	(England)	Oliver Green	(England) Bridlington Town	April 2022	
18 March 2022	FW	(England)	Will Jarvis	(England) Scarborough Athletic	End of season	
18 March 2022	FW	(England)	Josh Hinds	(England) Gainsborough Trinity	April 2022	
22 March 2022	FW	(England)	McCauley Snelgrove	(England) Cleethorpes Town	End of season	
22 March 2022	FW	(England)	Rio Dyer	(England) Cinderford Town	End of season	
24 March 2022	FB	(England)	Tom Nixon	(England) Pickering Town	End of season	
24 March 2022	CM	(England)	Andy Cannon	(England) Stockport County	End of season	
25 March 2022	GK	(England)	David Robson	(England) Farsley Celtic	End of season	
26 March 2022	MF	(England)	Sam Deacon	(England) Hall Road Rangers	End of season	
29 March 2022	DF	(England)	Henry Curtis	(England) Hall Road Rangers	End of season	
1 May 2022	GK	(England)	Matt Ingram	(England) Luton Town	18 May 2022	

== Pre-season ==
Pre-season training started on 28 June 2021 at the club's Cottingham training ground. A week-long training camp follows in Scotland.

The first friendly matches announced take place on 24 July, with a 12 o'clock home match against Mansfield Town, and a 3 o'clock away match at Glanford Park against Scunthorpe United. A further friendly match was announced for 7 o'clock 30 July 2021 away to Sunderland. On 27 July, a practice match against Manchester United U23s was also added to the schedule, to be held on 31 July 2021, behind closed doors.

Win Draw Loss Postponed

24 July 2021 Friendly	Hull City	1–2	Mansfield Town	Kingston upon Hull
12:00 BST	Magennis 67'	Report	Johnson 31' (pen.), 47'	Stadium: MKM Stadium; Attendance: 1,862

24 July 2021 Friendly	Scunthorpe United	0–1	Hull City	Scunthorpe
15:00 BST		Report	Cannon 85'	Stadium: Glanford Park

30 July 2021 Friendly	Sunderland	2–1	Hull City	Sunderland
19:00 BST	Stewart 25'; Grigg 90'	Report	Magennis 68'	Stadium: Stadium of Light

31 July 2021 Friendly	Hull City	2–0	Manchester United U23s	Kingston upon Hull
12:00 BST	Huddlestone 58'; Eaves 60'	Report	Mee (red card) 81'	Stadium: MKM Stadium; Attendance: 0
Note: Held behind-closed-doors

== Competitions ==
=== Overall ===
Competition	Started round	Current position / round	Final position / round	First match	Last match
Championship	—	—	19th	7 August 2021	7 May 2022
EFL Cup	First round	—	First round	10 August 2021	10 August 2021
FA Cup	Third round	—	Third round	8 January 2022	8 January 2022

Updated to match played 7 May 2022.
Source: Competitions

=== Championship ===
The first matches of the 2021–22 season are scheduled to take place on 7 August 2021 with the season concluding on the weekend of 7 to 8 May 2022. Hull City's fixtures were revealed on 24 June 2021 and the season starts with an away match against Preston North End. The season ends with a home match against Nottingham Forest.

==== League table ====
Pos	Team	Pld	W	D	L	GF	GA	GD	Pts	Promotion, qualification or relegation
16	Blackpool	46	16	12	18	54	58	−4	60	
17	Bristol City	46	15	10	21	62	77	−15	55	
18	Cardiff City	46	15	8	23	50	68	−18	53	
19	Hull City	46	14	9	23	41	54	−13	51	
20	Birmingham City	46	11	14	21	50	75	−25	47	
21	Reading	46	13	8	25	54	87	−33	41 (Note: Reading were deducted 6 points for breach of profit and sustainability regulations.)	
22	Peterborough United (R)	46	9	10	27	43	87	−44	37	Relegation to EFL League One

Source: EFL Official Website
Rules for classification: 1) Points; 2) Goal difference; 3) Number of goals scored; 4) Head-to-head results; 5) Wins; 6) Away goals; 7) Penalty points (sec 9.5); 8) 12-point sending off offences
(R) Relegated

==== Results summary ====
Overall								Home						Away					
Pld	W	D	L	GF	GA	GD	Pts	W	D	L	GF	GA	GD	W	D	L	GF	GA	GD
46	14	9	23	41	54	−13	51	7	4	12	22	28	−6	7	5	11	19	26	−7

Last updated: 7 May 2022.

==== Results by matchday ====
Matchday	1	2	3	4	5	6	7	8	9	10	11	12	13	14	15	16	17	18	19	20	21	22	23	24	25	26	27	28	29	30	31	32	33	34	35	36	37	38	39	40	41	42	43	44	45	46
Ground	A	H	H	A	H	A	A	H	A	H	H	A	H	A	H	A	A	H	A	H	A	H	A	A	H	H	A	H	H	A	H	A	A	H	A	H	A	A	H	H	A	H	A	H	A	H
Result	W	L	L	L	D	D	L	L	L	D	W	L	L	L	L	L	W	W	W	W	D	D	L	L	L	W	W	W	L	L	L	D	D	L	W	L	D	W	L	L	W	W	L	W	L	D
Position	1	12	18	19	18	20	21	23	23	23	21	21	22	22	22	23	22	21	19	19	19	19	19	19	19	19	19	18	19	19	19	20	20	20	18	20	20	19	20	20	20	19	19	18	18	19

Updated to match(es) played on 7 May 2022. Source: Statto.com
A = Away; H = Home; W = Win; D = Draw; L = Loss

==== Matches ====
Win Draw Loss Postponed

7 August 2021 1	Preston North End	1–4	Hull City	Preston
15:00 BST	Riis Jakobsen 8'; Barkhuizen (yellow card) 45+5'; Ledson (yellow card) 65'	Report	Lewis-Potter 35', (yellow card) 75'; Smallwood 62'; Magennis 85'; Eaves (yellow card) 90+1'; Cannon 90+2'	Stadium: Deepdale; Attendance: 12,452; Referee: Gavin Ward

14 August 2021 2	Hull City	0–3	Queens Park Rangers	Kingston upon Hull
15:00 BST	Moncur (red card) 71'	Report	Willock 16'; Dykes 68'; Dickie 74'	Stadium: MKM Stadium; Attendance: 10,728; Referee: Matt Donohue

18 August 2021 3	Hull City	0–1	Derby County	Kingston upon Hull
19:45 BST	Jones (yellow card) 71'	Report	Baldock 57'; Morrison (yellow card) 79'; Roos (yellow card) 90+2'; Stretton (yellow card) 90+3'	Stadium: MKM Stadium; Attendance: 10,451; Referee: Dean Whitestone

21 August 2021 4	Fulham	2–0	Hull City	Fulham
15:00 BST	Mitrović 22'; Carvalho 34'; Robinson (yellow card) 61'; Cavaleiro (yellow card) 78'; Adarabioyo (yellow card) 81'	Report	Smallwood (yellow card) 45+3'; Bernard (yellow card) 82'	Stadium: Craven Cottage; Referee: Tim Robinson

28 August 2021 5	Hull City	0–0	AFC Bournemouth	Kingston upon Hull
15:00 BST		Report	Stacey (yellow card) 45+2'; Pearson (yellow card) 90+3'	Stadium: MKM Stadium; Attendance: 10,199; Referee: Geoff Eltringham

11 September 2021 6	Swansea City	0–0	Hull City	Landore
15:00 BST	Paterson (yellow card) 60'	Report	Bernard (yellow card) 61'; Lewis-Potter (yellow card) 90+6'	Stadium: Swansea.com Stadium; Attendance: 16,317; Referee: Keith Stroud

14 September 2021 7	Blackburn Rovers	2–0	Hull City	Blackburn
19:45 BST	Ayala 61'; Brereton 65'; Pickering (yellow card) 74'	Report	Elder (yellow card) 59'; Bernard (yellow card) 79'	Stadium: Ewood Park; Attendance: 9,140; Referee: John Brooks

18 September 2021 8	Hull City	1–3	Sheffield United	Kingston upon Hull
12:30 BST	Greaves (yellow card) 43'; Honeyman (yellow card) 48'; Smallwood (yellow card) 57'; Lewis-Potter 74'	Report	Sharp 17'; Egan 50', 61'; Norrington-Davies (yellow card) 53'; Guedioura (yellow card) 66'	Stadium: MKM Stadium; Attendance: 14,451; Referee: Dean Whitestone

25 September 2021 9	Stoke City	2–0	Hull City	Stoke-on-Trent
15:00 BST	Vrančić 35'; Powell 58'; Clucas (yellow card) 87'; Surridge (yellow card) 90'	Report		Stadium: Bet365 Stadium; Attendance: 20,124; Referee: Thomas Bramall

28 September 2021 10	Hull City	1–1	Blackpool	Kingston upon Hull
19:45 BST	Wilks (yellow card) 38'; Coyle (yellow card) 45+2' (yellow-red card) 80'; Eaves 84'	Report	Lavery 42', (yellow card) 82'; Garbutt (yellow card) 68'	Stadium: MKM Stadium; Attendance: 10,189; Referee: Matt Donohue

2 October 2021 11	Hull City	2–0	Middlesbrough	Kingston upon Hull
15:00 BST	Lumley 81' (o.g.); Wilks (yellow card) 90+2', (goal) 90+3'	Report	Tavernier (yellow card) 7'; Peltier (yellow card) 58'; McNair (yellow card) 78'	Stadium: MKM Stadium; Attendance: 13,696; Referee: Andy Davies

16 October 2021 12	Huddersfield Town	2–0	Hull City	Huddersfield
15:00 BST	Colwill (yellow card) 1'; Lees 9'; Holmes 73'	Report	Smallwood (yellow card) 28'; Honeyman (yellow card) 43'	Stadium: Kirklees Stadium; Attendance: 17,510; Referee: Robert Jones

20 October 2021 13	Hull City	1–2	Peterborough United	Kingston upon Hull
19:45 BST	Huddlestone (yellow card) 15'; Magennis 45+2'	Report	Edwards (yellow card) 16'; Taylor 43'; Thompson (yellow card) 47'; Dembélé 72'	Stadium: MKM Stadium; Attendance: 10,245; Referee: Leigh Doughty

23 October 2021 14	Luton Town	1–0	Hull City	Luton
15:00 BST	Adebayo 17'	Report	Bernard (yellow card) 27'	Stadium: Kenilworth Road; Attendance: 9,999; Referee: John Busby

30 October 2021 15	Hull City	0–1	Coventry City	Kingston upon Hull
15:00 BST	Eaves (yellow card) 53'; Cannon (yellow card) 65'	Report	Godden 9'	Stadium: MKM Stadium; Attendance: 11,901; Referee: David Webb

2 November 2021 16	West Bromwich Albion	1–0	Hull City	West Bromwich
20:00 GMT	Grant 69'; Snodgrass (yellow card) 90+1'; Reach (yellow card) 90+5'	Report	Honeyman (yellow card) 37'; Docherty (yellow card) 61'	Stadium: The Hawthorns; Attendance: 19,659; Referee: Dean Whitestone

6 November 2021 17	Barnsley	0–2	Hull City	Barnsley
15:00 GMT	Benson (yellow card) 66'; Brittain (yellow card) 88'	Report	Honeyman (yellow card) 26', (goal) 33'; Greaves (yellow card) 50'; Lewis-Potter 75'	Stadium: Oakwell; Attendance: 13,003; Referee: Steve Martin

20 November 2021 18	Hull City	2–0	Birmingham City	Kingston upon Hull
15:00 GMT	Honeyman 17'; Magennis (yellow card) 43'; Bernard (yellow card) 45+3'; Wilks 57'; Greaves (yellow card) 65'; Docherty (yellow card) 83'	Report	Hogan (yellow card) 34'; Gardner (red card) 43'	Stadium: MKM Stadium; Attendance: 12,409; Referee: Tony Harrington

24 November 2021 19	Cardiff City	0–1	Hull City	Cardiff
19:45 GMT	McGuinness (yellow card) 57'; Giles (yellow card) 90+4'	Report	Lewis-Potter 15', (yellow card) 55'; Greaves (yellow card) 90+4'	Stadium: Cardiff City Stadium; Attendance: 17,180; Referee: Thomas Bramall

27 November 2021 20	Hull City	2–1	Millwall	Kingston upon Hull
15:00 GMT	Honeyman 29'; Smallwood (yellow card) 40'; Longman 53'; Eaves (yellow card) 89'	Report	Bradshaw 45+1'; McNamara (yellow card) 63'; Afobe (yellow card) 89'	Stadium: MKM Stadium; Attendance: 10,613; Referee: Josh Smith

4 December 2021 21	Reading	1–1	Hull City	Reading
15:00 GMT	Halilović (yellow card) 40'; Holmes 45+2'; Rahman (yellow card) 74'	Report	Wilks 55'; Elder (yellow card) 90+3'	Stadium: Madejski Stadium; Attendance: 11,827; Referee: Steve Martin

11 December 2021 22	Hull City	2–2	Bristol City	Kingston upon Hull
15:00 GMT	Longman 3'; Honeyman 79'; Smallwood (yellow card) 84'	Report	Semenyo 54'; Kalas (yellow card) 59'; Massengo (yellow card) 65'; James 90+1'	Stadium: MKM Stadium; Attendance: 10,446; Referee: Gavin Ward

18 December 2021 23	Nottingham Forest	2–1	Hull City	West Bridgford, Nottingham
15:00 GMT	Colback (yellow card) 29'; Grabban 55' (pen.); Worrall (yellow card) 72'; Johnson 72'	Report	McLoughlin (yellow card) 17'; Longman (yellow card) 36'; Lewis-Potter 43'; Smallwood (yellow card) 52'; Baxter (yellow card) 54'; Bernard (yellow card) 83'	Stadium: City Ground; Attendance: 26,513; Referee: John Busby

1 January 2022 24	Blackpool	1–0	Hull City	Blackpool
15:00 GMT	Madine 31' (pen.)	Report	Bernard (yellow card) 67'; Honeyman (yellow card) 76'	Stadium: Bloomfield Road; Attendance: 11,300; Referee: Dean Whitestone

16 January 2022 25	Hull City	0–2	Stoke City	Kingston upon Hull
12:00 GMT	Docherty (yellow card) 17'; Bernard (yellow card) 64'; Smallwood (yellow card) 71'	Report	Brown 22'; Ince 50'; Doughty (yellow card) 81'	Stadium: MKM Stadium; Attendance: 11,067; Referee: Josh Smith

19 January 2022 26	Hull City	2–0	Blackburn Rovers	Kingston upon Hull
19:45 GMT	Honeyman 8'; Eaves 67'	Report	Rothwell (yellow card) 81'; Lenihan (yellow card) 88'; Brereton (yellow card) 90+5'	Stadium: MKM Stadium; Attendance: 13,950; Referee: Thomas Bramall

22 January 2022 27	AFC Bournemouth	0–1	Hull City	Bournemouth
15:00 GMT	Stacey (yellow card) 21'; Lerma (yellow card) 58'	Report	Smallwood (yellow card) 58'; Longman 77'; Smith (yellow card) 90+9'	Stadium: Dean Court; Attendance: 8,823; Referee: Matt Donohue

29 January 2022 28	Hull City	2–0	Swansea City	Kingston upon Hull
15:00 GMT	Eaves 5'; Lewis-Potter 17'	Report	Manning (yellow card) 80'; Walsh (yellow card) 85'	Stadium: MKM Stadium; Attendance: 13,101; Referee: Leigh Doughty

5 February 2022 29	Hull City	0–1	Preston North End	Kingston upon Hull
15:00 GMT		Report	Archer 51', (yellow card) 85'; Johnson (yellow card) 79'	Stadium: MKM Stadium; Attendance: 14,273; Referee: Darren Bond

8 February 2022 30	Derby County	3–1	Hull City	Derby
19:45 GMT	Forsyth 19'; Lawrence 38'; Ebosele 47'; Bielik (yellow card) 53'; Bird (yellow card) 90+4'	Report	Docherty (yellow card) 17'; Greaves (yellow card) 21'; Honeyman (yellow card) 89'	Stadium: Pride Park Stadium; Attendance: 22,595; Referee: Geoff Eltringham

12 February 2022 31	Hull City	0–1	Fulham	Kingston upon Hull
15:00 GMT	Slater (yellow card) 19'; Fleming (yellow card) 65'	Report	Mitrović 57'; Decordova-Reid (yellow card) 89'	Stadium: MKM Stadium; Attendance: 13,022; Referee: Andy Woolmer

15 February 2022 32	Sheffield United	0–0	Hull City	Sheffield
19:45 GMT	Ndiaye (yellow card) 67'; Baldock (yellow card) 83'	Report	Honeyman (yellow card) 45+3'; McLoughlin (yellow card) 75'	Stadium: Bramall Lane; Attendance: 27,601; Referee: Oliver Langford

19 February 2022 33	Queens Park Rangers	1–1	Hull City	White City, London
15:00 GMT	Chair (yellow card) 34', (goal) 75'; Austin (yellow card) 90'	Report	Forss 26', (yellow card) 45+3'	Stadium: Loftus Road; Attendance: 14,945; Referee: Tim Robinson

22 February 2022 34	Hull City	0–2	Barnsley	Kingston upon Hull
19:45 GMT	Fleming (yellow card) 45+1'	Repo.rt	Styles 27'; Morris 45+2'	Stadium: MKM Stadium; Attendance: 16,421; Referee: Steve Martin

26 February 2022 35	Peterborough United	0–3	Hull City	Peterborough
15:00 GMT	Szmodics (yellow card) 15'; Brown (yellow card) 54'; Knight (yellow card) 66'	Report	Smith 25'; Lewis-Potter 51', 70'	Stadium: London Road Stadium; Attendance: 9,463; Referee: Tony Harrington

5 March 2022 36	Hull City	0–2	West Bromwich Albion	Kingston upon Hull
15:00 GMT	Greaves (yellow card) 47'; McLoughlin (yellow card) 73'	Report	Grant 17', 48' (pen.); Clarke (yellow card) 27'; Robinson (yellow card) 82'	Stadium: MKM Stadium; Attendance: 13,643; Referee: James Linington

12 March 2022 37	Birmingham City	0–0	Hull City	Bordesley
15:00 GMT		Report	Jones (yellow card) 46'	Stadium: St Andrew's; Attendance: 17,231; Referee: Michael Salisbury

16 March 2022 38	Coventry City	0–2	Hull City	Coventry
19:45 GMT	Hamer (yellow card) 73'; Maatsen (yellow card) 90+4'	Report	Smallwood 4'; Longman 28'	Stadium: CBS Arena; Attendance: 15,587; Referee: John Busby

19 March 2022 39	Hull City	1–3	Luton Town	Kingston upon Hull
15:00 GMT	Huddlestone (yellow card) 71'; Honeyman (yellow card) 86'; Eaves 90+2'	Report	Adebayo 9'; Clark (yellow card) 11'; Kioso (yellow card) 25'; Cornick 56'; Bree 72'	Stadium: MKM Stadium; Attendance: 16,555; Referee: Tony Harrington

1 April 2022 40	Hull City	0–1	Huddersfield Town	Kingston upon Hull
19:45 BST	Eaves (yellow card) 11' (yellow-red card) 45+2'; Fleming (yellow card) 41'; Docherty (yellow card) 78'	Report	Thomas (yellow card) 41'; Toffolo 79'	Stadium: MKM Stadium; Attendance: 12,764; Referee: Jeremy Simpson

9 April 2022 41	Middlesbrough	0–1	Hull City	Middlesbrough
15:00 BST	Crooks (yellow card) 16'; Tavernier (yellow card) 70'; Connolly (yellow card) 81'	Report	McLoughlin (yellow card) 26'; Slater (yellow card) 42'; Lewis-Potter 74'; Smallwood (yellow card) 80'; Honeyman (yellow card) 85'; Docherty (yellow card) 89'	Stadium: Riverside Stadium; Attendance: 24,603; Referee: Andy Woolmer

15 April 2022 42	Hull City	2–1	Cardiff City	Kingston upon Hull
15:00 BST	Sayyadmanesh 8'; Coyle 11'	Report	Ikpeazu (yellow card) 36'; Denham (yellow card) 45+1'; Flint (yellow card) 69', (goal) 81'	Stadium: MKM Stadium; Attendance: 15,685; Referee: Steve Martin

18 April 2022 43	Millwall	2–1	Hull City	Bermondsey
15:00 BST	Ballard (yellow card) 16'; Malone 51'; Bradshaw 55'; Białkowski (yellow card) 87'	Report	Eaves 87'	Stadium: The Den; Attendance: 12,776; Referee: Dean Whitestone

23 April 2022 44	Hull City	3–0	Reading	Kingston upon Hull
15:00 BST	Lewis-Potter 40', 90+4'; Jones 53'; Greaves (yellow card) 59'; Baxter (yellow card) 86'	Report	Morrison (yellow card) 73'	Stadium: MKM Stadium; Attendance: 12,211; Referee: Tim Robinson

30 April 2022 45	Bristol City	5–0	Hull City	Ashton Gate, Bristol
15:00 BST	Weimann 5', 82'; Scott (yellow card) 23'; Semenyo 33'; Martin 35', 54'	Report	Smallwood (yellow card) 88'; Alfie Jones (yellow card) 90'	Stadium: Ashton Gate Stadium; Attendance: 21,799; Referee: Ben Toner

7 May 2022 46	Hull City	1–1	Nottingham Forest	Kingston upon Hull
12:30 BST	Lewis-Potter 90+4'	Report	Figueiredo (yellow card) 63'; Johnson 90+2' (pen.), (yellow card) 90+3'	Stadium: MKM Stadium; Attendance: 18,399; Referee: Simon Hooper

=== FA Cup ===
Hull City entered the competition in the third-round, the draw for which took place on 6 December 2021. Hull were drawn at home to Everton with the match taking place between 7 and 10 January 2022. The match was selected for live broadcast on BBC One.

Win Draw Loss Postponed

8 January 2022 3rd round	Hull City	2–3 (a.e.t.)	Everton	Kingston upon Hull
17:30 GMT	Smith 1'; Longman 71'; Huddlestone (yellow card) 90+5'	BBC Report; Sky Report	Gray 21'; Gomes 31'; Mykolenko (yellow card) 45+1'; Townsend 99'; Godfrey (yellow card) 114'	Stadium: MKM Stadium; Attendance: 16,282; Referee: Andrew Madley

=== EFL Cup ===
Hull City were in the northern section of the draw and were drawn at home to Wigan Athletic in the first round. The match took place on 10 August 2021, and with few real chances in the first half. The second half saw an early attempt by Stephen Humphrys saved by Nathan Baxter. On 50-minutes a header by Humphrys was spilled by Baxter, but he was on hand to convert the rebound. Minutes later Keane Lewis-Potter brought Hull level with a shot from the edge of the area. With no more goals the match finished 1–1 and sent the game to a penalty shoot out. Fifteen penalties were converted, before Di'Shon Bernard sent his effort over the crossbar, leaving Jordan Cousins to put Wigan through to the second round.

Win Draw Loss Postponed

10 August 2021 First round	Hull City	1–1 (7–8 p)	Wigan Athletic	Kingston upon Hull
19:45 BST	Lewis-Potter 54'	Report	Humphrys 50'	Stadium: MKM Stadium; Attendance: 4,139; Referee: Martin Coy
	Penalties
	Eaves (penalty scored); Scott (penalty scored); Wood (penalty scored); Emmanuel (penalty scored); M. Smith (penalty scored); Jarvis (penalty scored); Fleming (penalty scored); Bernard (penalty missed)		Keane (penalty scored); Aasgaard (penalty scored); Jordan Jones (penalty scored); Massey (penalty scored); Naylor (penalty scored); Jamie Jones (penalty scored); Robinson (penalty scored); Cousins (penalty scored)

== Statistics ==
=== Appearances ===
As of 7 May 2022.

No.	Pos	Nat	Player	Total		Championship		FA Cup		League Cup	
No.	Pos	Nat	Player	Apps	Goals	Apps	Goals	Apps	Goals	Apps	Goals
1	GK	(England) ENG	Matt Ingram	29	0	29	0	0	0	0	0
2	DF	(England) ENG	Lewie Coyle	23	1	21+2	1	0	0	0	0
3	DF	(Australia) AUS	Callum Elder	28	0	21+7	0	0	0	0	0
4	DF	(England) ENG	Jacob Greaves	48	0	46	0	1	0	1	0
5	DF	(England) ENG	Alfie Jones	23	1	21+2	1	0	0	0	0
6	MF	(England) ENG	Richie Smallwood	43	2	40+2	2	1	0	0	0
7	FW	(England) ENG	Mallik Wilks	20	3	17+3	3	0	0	0	0
8	MF	(Scotland) SCO	Greg Docherty	41	0	31+9	0	1	0	0	0
9	FW	(England) ENG	Tom Eaves	33	5	12+19	5	1	0	1	0
10	MF	(England) ENG	George Honeyman	36	5	34+1	5	1	0	0	0
11	FW	(England) ENG	Keane Lewis-Potter	48	13	46	12	1	0	1	1
12	DF	(England) ENG	Josh Emmanuel	7	0	3+3	0	0	0	1	0
13	GK	(England) ENG	Nathan Baxter	18	0	16	0	1	0	1	0
14	MF	(England) ENG	Andy Cannon	11	1	4+6	1	0	0	1	0
15	FW	(Scotland) SCO	James Scott	2	0	0+1	0	0	0	1	0
16	MF	(England) ENG	Ryan Longman	36	5	26+9	4	0+1	1	0	0
17	DF	(Republic of Ireland) IRL	Sean McLoughlin	33	0	29+3	0	1	0	0	0
18	MF	(England) ENG	George Moncur	16	0	7+7	0	0+1	0	1	0
19	MF	(England) ENG	Randell Williams	14	0	4+9	0	1	0	0	0
20	MF	(Wales) WAL	Matt Smith	10	0	6+3	0	0	0	1	0
20	FW	(Iran) IRI	Allahyar Sayyadmanesh	12	1	6+6	1	0	0	0	0
21	DF	(England) ENG	Brandon Fleming	17	0	15+1	0	0	0	1	0
22	FW	(England) ENG	Tyler Smith	25	2	7+16	1	1	1	1	0
23	MF	(England) ENG	Tom Huddlestone	11	0	4+6	0	0+1	0	0	0
24	DF	(England) ENG	Di'Shon Bernard	28	0	25+1	0	1	0	1	0
26	DF	(England) ENG	Andy Smith	1	0	0	0	0	0	0+1	0
27	FW	(Northern Ireland) NIR	Josh Magennis	19	2	18+1	2	0	0	0	0
27	MF	(England) ENG	Regan Slater	16	0	12+4	0	0	0	0	0
28	MF	(Wales) WAL	Callum Jones	2	0	0+2	0	0	0	0	0
32	GK	(England) ENG	Harvey Cartwright	2	0	1+1	0	0	0	0	0
33	MF	(England) ENG	Harry Wood	1	0	0	0	0	0	0+1	0
36	FW	(England) ENG	Will Jarvis	2	0	0+1	0	0	0	0+1	0
39	FW	(England) ENG	Josh Hinds	3	0	0+1	0	0+1	0	0+1	0
41	DF	(Republic of Ireland) IRL	Jevon Mills	1	0	0+1	0	0	0	0	0
44	FW	(Finland) FIN	Marcus Forss	11	1	5+6	1	0	0	0	0
45	MF	(England) ENG	Liam Walsh	3	0	1+2	0	0	0	0	0

- Source: Compiled from competitive match reports

Note: Appearances shown after a "+" indicate player came on during course of match.

=== Top goalscorers ===
Player	Number	Position	Championship	FA Cup	League Cup	Total
(England) Keane Lewis-Potter	11	FW	12	0	1	13
(England) Tom Eaves	9	FW	5	0	0	5
(England) George Honeyman	10	MF	5	0	0	5
(England) Ryan Longman	15	MF	4	1	0	5
(England) Mallik Wilks	7	FW	3	0	0	3
(Northern Ireland) Josh Magennis	27	FW	2	0	0	2
(England) Richie Smallwood	6	MF	2	0	0	2
(England) Tyler Smith	22	FW	1	1	0	2
(England) Andy Cannon	14	MF	1	0	0	1
(England) Lewie Coyle	2	DF	1	0	0	1
(Finland) Marcus Forss	44	FW	1	0	0	1
(England) Alfie Jones	5	DF	1	0	0	1
(Iran) Allahyar Sayyadmanesh	20	FW	1	0	0	1
Total			39	2	1	42

=== Disciplinary record ===
Player	Number	Position	Championship		FA Cup		League Cup		Total	
Player	Number	Position	Yellow card	Red card	Yellow card	Red card	Yellow card	Red card	Yellow card	Red card
(England) Tom Eaves	9	FW	4	1	0	0	0	0	4	1
(England) Lewie Coyle	2	DF	2	1	0	0	0	0	2	1
(England) George Moncur	18	MF	0	1	0	0	0	0	0	1
(England) Richie Smallwood	6	MF	10	0	0	0	0	0	10	0
(England) George Honeyman	10	MF	9	0	0	0	0	0	9	0
(England) Di'Shon Bernard	24	DF	8	0	0	0	0	0	8	0
(England) Jacob Greaves	4	DF	7	0	0	0	0	0	7	0
(Scotland) Greg Docherty	8	MF	6	0	0	0	0	0	6	0
(Republic of Ireland) Sean McLoughlin	17	DF	4	0	0	0	0	0	4	0
(England) Brandon Fleming	21	DF	3	0	0	0	0	0	3	0
(England) Tom Huddlestone	23	MF	2	0	1	0	0	0	3	0
(England) Alfie Jones	5	DF	3	0	0	0	0	0	3	0
(England) Keane Lewis-Potter	11	FW	3	0	0	0	0	0	3	0
(England) Nathan Baxter	13	GK	2	0	0	0	0	0	2	0
(Australia) Callum Elder	3	DF	2	0	0	0	0	0	2	0
(England) Regan Slater	27	MF	2	0	0	0	0	0	2	0
(England) Mallik Wilks	7	FW	2	0	0	0	0	0	2	0
(England) Andy Cannon	14	MF	1	0	0	0	0	0	1	0
(Finland) Marcus Forss	44	FW	1	0	0	0	0	0	1	0
(England) Ryan Longman	15	MF	1	0	0	0	0	0	1	0
(Northern Ireland) Josh Magennis	27	FW	1	0	0	0	0	0	1	0
(England) Tyler Smith	22	FW	1	0	0	0	0	0	1	0
Total			74	3	1	0	0	0	75	3

== Kits ==
On 18 June 2021, the club unveiled the new home kit for the season, the shirts described as amber and "features a diagonal pattern with a striking black sash and stylised crew neckline, with 'Tigers' lettering on the back". The shorts are to be black with amber side panels while the socks are amber with black detail. Local company Giacom would continue as main shirt sponsors, with On Line Group continuing as back-of-shirt sponsors. The away kit was revealed on 9 July 2021, a blackout kit with a "tone-on-tone front stripe". The shorts would be black with a tonal side panel and black socks with tonal cuff detail. The third kit for the season was unveiled on 10 September 2021, as a claret shirt with black shoulders and an amber trim. The shorts would be amber with a black side panel and the socks claret, with black top and amber hoop.

== Awards ==
The annual awards for the club saw Keane Lewis-Potter pick-up the Player of the Year, Players' Player of the Year and Supporters' Player of the Year awards. Ryan Longman was presented with the Goal of the Season award for his goal against Everton on 8 January 2021 in the FA Cup which sent the match in to extra time. Jacob Greaves took the award for Young Player of the Year for a consecutive season. The Academy Player of the Year award went to Jevon Mills.
