= Josh Hinds =

English association footballer

Personal information
- Full name: Anthony Omarian Joshua Hinds
- Date of birth: 29 March 2003 (age 23)
- Place of birth: Essex, England
- Position: Forward

Youth career
- West Ham United
- 2019–2021: Hull City

Senior career*
Years	Team	Apps	(Gls)
2021–2023	Hull City	1	(0)
2021	→ Spalding United (loan)	5	(1)
2022	→ Gainsborough Trinity (loan)	2	(0)
2022	→ Boston United (loan)	1	(0)
2023	→ Bradford (Park Avenue) (loan)	6	(0)
2024	Queen's Park	0	(0)
2024	Truro City	12	(1)
2024–2025	Queen's Park	14	(1)
- * Club domestic league appearances and goals as of 09:22, 12 March 2025 (UTC)

Anthony Omarian Joshua Hinds (born 29 March 2003) is an English professional footballer who plays as a forward.

== Career ==
A youth product of West Ham United, Hinds moved to the Hull City youth academy in 2019 at the U18 level. He made his professional debut with Hull City in a 0–0 EFL Championship tie with Bournemouth on 28 August 2021. On 19 November 2021, Hinds moved on a month-long loan to Spalding United. The loan was expected to be extended but on 30 December 2021 he was recalled by Hull City. Shortly after his return to Hull City, Hinds made an appearance as a substitute in the televised F.A. Cup third round defeat against Everton.

On 18 March 2022, Hinds moved on a month-long loan spell to Gainsborough Trinity.

On 4 November 2022, Hinds joined National League North side Boston United on a one-month loan deal.

On 17 February 2023, Hinds joined National League North side Bradford (Park Avenue) on a month-long loan spell. At the end of the season Hinds was released by Hull City.

In February 2024, Hinds joined Scottish Championship club Queen's Park on a short-term contract until the end of the season. After being unable to obtain international clearance in Scotland, Hinds instead joined National League South side Truro City the following month. On 16 March 2024, he made his debut for Truro as a substitute in a 2–1 win over St Albans City.

On 3 July 2024, Hinds once again joined Queen's Park, this time successfully obtaining international clearance, on a one-year deal with an option to extend for a further year.

== Career statistics ==
As of 8 January 2022.

Appearances and goals by club, season and competition
Club	Season	League			FA Cup		EFL Cup		Europe		Other		Total	
Club	Season	Division	Apps	Goals	Apps	Goals	Apps	Goals	Apps	Goals	Apps	Goals	Apps	Goals
Hull City	2021–22	Championship	1	0	1	0	0	0	—		—		2	0
Career total			1	0	1	0	0	0	0	0	0	0	2	0
