= 2018–19 Hull City A.F.C. season =

English football club season

Hull City A.F.C.
2018–19 season
- Owner: Assem Allam
- Manager: Nigel Adkins
- Stadium: KCOM Stadium
- Championship: 13th
- FA Cup: Third round (v Millwall)
- EFL Cup: Second round (v Derby County)
- Top goalscorer: League: Jarrod Bowen (22); All: Jarrod Bowen (22)
- Highest home attendance: 14,116 (22 April v Sheffield United)
- Lowest home attendance: 10,191 (26 February v Millwall)
- Average home league attendance: 12,165
- Biggest win: 6–0 v Bolton Wanderers (1 January 2019)
- Biggest defeat: 0–4 v Derby County (28 August 2018, EFL Cup, R2)
Home colours	Away colours	Third colours

The 2018–19 season is Hull City's second consecutive season in the Championship and their 115th year in existence. Along with the Championship, the club competed in the FA Cup and EFL Cup.

The season covers the period from 1 July 2018 to 30 June 2019.

== Events ==
- On 18 May 2018, Josh Clackstone, Greg Luer, David Meyler and Greg Olley were released by the club, while Max Clark, Abel Hernández, Sebastian Larsson and Moses Odubajo were offered new deals.
- On 18 May 2018, Adam Curry signed a new one-year deal with the club.
- On 4 June 2018, Abel Hernández left the club by mutual consent after failing to agree a new contract with the club.
- On 11 June 2018 Sebastian Larsson rejected a new contract offer deciding to return to Sweden to play for AIK.
- On 14 June 2018, Moses Odubajo rejected a contract extension with the club and will leave on 1 July 2018.
- On 22 June 2018, defender Eric Lichaj signed a two-year deal with Hull City for an undisclosed fee.
- On 22 June 2018, Max Clark was reported as joining Vitesse Arnhem at the end of his contract.
- On 1 July 2018, Callum Smith joined in a free transfer from Newcastle United.
- On 5 July 2018, Craig Fagan and Luke Templeman were appointed to the coaching staff of the academy.
- On 9 July 2018, David Milinković of Genoa signed a three-year deal with the club for an undisclosed fee.
- On 10 July 2018, Reece Burke of West Ham United signed a three-year deal with the club for an undisclosed fee.
- On 11 July 2018, Jordy de Wijs of PSV Eindhoven signed a three-year deal with the club for an undisclosed fee.
- On 17 July 2018, Todd Kane signed on a season-long loan from Chelsea.
- On 18 July 2018, goalkeeper George Long of Sheffield United signed a three-year deal with the club for an undisclosed fee.
- On 27 July 2018, Charlie Andrew returned on a season-long loan to Pickering Town.
- On 1 August 2018, Markus Henriksen was named captain for the season.
- On 3 August 2018, Jonathan Edwards moved on a free transfer to FC Halifax Town.
- On 9 August 2018, goalkeeper Will Mannion went on loan at Aldershot Town until 20 January 2019, but this was later extended until the end of the season.
- On 24 August 2018, goalkeeper Callum Burton went on loan at Chesterfield until 16 January 2019.
- On 31 August 2018, Tommy Elphick joined on a season-long loan from Aston Villa and Chris Martin joined on a season-long loan from Derby County.
- On 30 November 2018, Adam Curry moved on loan to Alfreton Town until 1 January 2019.
- On 5 December 2018, Max Sheaf signed a new two-and-a-half-year deal with the club.
- On 29 December 2018, Aston Villa recalled Tommy Elphick from his loan spell.
- On 4 January 2019, Will Keane moved to Ipswich Town on loan until the end of the season.
- In January 2019, Jarrod Bowen won the EFL Championship Player of the Month award for December 2018 and manager Nigel Adkins won the EFL Championship Manager of the Month award for December 2018.
- On 22 January 2019, Marc Pugh joined on loan from Bournemouth for the rest of the season.
- On 30 January 2019, Charlie Andrew's season-long loan to Pickering Town was cut short when he moved on loan to Bradford Park Avenue for the remainder of the season.
- On 31 January 2019, Liam Ridgewell signed a deal for the remainder of the season on a free transfer from Portland Timbers.
- On 2 February 2019, goalkeeper Harrison Foulkes joined Pickering Town on loan until the end of the season.
- On 5 February 2019, the new club crest was revealed that would be used from the start of the 2019–20 season.
- On 20 February 2019, Matty Jacob joined Pickering Town on loan until the end of the season.
- On 28 February 2019, former City goalkeeper, Johnny Saltmer signed for Barrow until the end off the season.
- On 1 March 2019, Markus Henriksen and Will Mannion had their contracts with the club extended by 1 year.
- On 8 March 2019, goalkeeper David Robson moved to Stocksbridge Park Steels until 30 April 2019 to gain some work experience.
- On 28 March 2019, Adam Curry moved on loan to Alfreton Town for the remainder of the season.
- On 29 March 2019, Keane Lewis-Potter went out on loan to Bradford Park Avenue for the remainder of the season.
- On 25 April 2019, Marc Pugh's loan spell ended as he returned to Bournemouth with a broken toe sustained in the match against Sheffield United on 22 April.
- On 17 May 2019, the club announced that Callum Burton, Adam Curry, Evandro, Will Keane, Ondřej Mazuch, Liam Ridgewell and James Weir were released at the end of the season. At the same time they indicated that new contracts would be offered to Fraizer Campbell and David Marshall.
- On 8 June 2019, manager Nigel Atkins indicated that he would not take-up the offer of a new contract with the club and would leave the club at the end of the season. Assistant manager Andy Crosby would also leave the club at the same time.

== First team squad ==
As of 25 April 2019

Note: Flags indicate national team as defined under FIFA eligibility rules; some limited exceptions apply. Players may hold more than one non-FIFA nationality.

No.	Pos.	Nation	Player
1	GK	SCO	David Marshall
2	DF	USA	Eric Lichaj
3	DF	CZE	Ondřej Mazuch
4	DF	NED	Jordy de Wijs
5	DF	ENG	Reece Burke
6	MF	ENG	Kevin Stewart
7	MF	BRA	Evandro
9	FW	MLI	Nouha Dicko
10	MF	ESP	Jon Toral
11	MF	SRB	David Milinković
12	GK	ENG	George Long
13	GK	ENG	Callum Burton
14	MF	POL	Kamil Grosicki
15	DF	ENG	Angus MacDonald
16	MF	AUS	Jackson Irvine
17	DF	ENG	Todd Kane (on loan from Chelsea)

No.	Pos.	Nation	Player
18	MF	ENG	Daniel Batty
20	FW	ENG	Jarrod Bowen
21	DF	ENG	Brandon Fleming
22	MF	NOR	Markus Henriksen (captain)
23	DF	SCO	Stephen Kingsley
24	MF	ENG	James Weir
25	FW	ENG	Fraizer Campbell
26	DF	ENG	Adam Curry
27	DF	ENG	Robbie McKenzie
28	MF	ENG	Max Sheaf
29	FW	SCO	Chris Martin (on loan from Derby County)
33	DF	ENG	Lewis Ritson
34	FW	ENG	Keane Lewis-Potter
36	DF	ENG	Liam Ridgewell

=== Out on loan ===
Note: Flags indicate national team as defined under FIFA eligibility rules; some limited exceptions apply. Players may hold more than one non-FIFA nationality.

No.	Pos.	Nation	Player
19	FW	ENG	Will Keane (On loan to Ipswich Town)
–	GK	ENG	Charlie Andrew (On loan to Bradford Park Avenue)
–	GK	ENG	Will Mannion (On loan to Aldershot Town)

== Transfers ==
=== Transfers in ===
Date from	Position	Nationality	Name	From	Fee	Ref.
1 July 2018	RB	(United States)	Eric Lichaj	Nottingham Forest	Undisclosed	
1 July 2018	LW	(England)	Callum Smith	Newcastle United	Free transfer	
9 July 2018	LM	(France)	David Milinković	(Italy) Genoa	Undisclosed	
10 July 2018	CB	(England)	Reece Burke	West Ham United	£1,500,000	
11 July 2018	CB	(Netherlands)	Jordy de Wijs	(Netherlands) PSV Eindhoven	Undisclosed	
18 July 2018	GK	(England)	George Long	Sheffield United	Undisclosed	
31 January 2019	CB	(England)	Liam Ridgewell	(United States) Portland Timbers	Free transfer	

=== Transfers out ===
Date from	Position	Nationality	Name	To	Fee	Ref.
1 July 2018	LB	(England)	Max Clark	(Netherlands) Vitesse Arnhem	Compensation	
1 July 2018	RB	(England)	Josh Clackstone	Alfreton Town	Released	
1 July 2018	CB	(England)	Michael Dawson	Nottingham Forest	Free transfer	
1 July 2018	CF	(Uruguay)	Abel Hernández	(Russia) CSKA Moscow	Mutual consent	
1 July 2018	MF	(Sweden)	Sebastian Larsson	(Sweden) AIK	Free transfer	
1 July 2018	CF	(England)	Greg Luer	Woking	Released	
1 July 2018	GK	(Scotland)	Allan McGregor	(Scotland) Rangers	Free transfer	
1 July 2018	CM	(Republic of Ireland)	David Meyler	Reading	Released	
1 July 2018	RB	(England)	Moses Odubajo	Brentford	Rejected contract	
1 July 2018	RM	(England)	Greg Olley	Gateshead	Released	
3 August 2018	CF	(England)	Jonathan Edwards	FC Halifax Town	Free transfer	
28 February 2019	GK	(England)	Johnny Saltmer	Barrow	Free transfer	

=== Loans in ===
Start date	Position	Nationality	Name	From	End date	Ref.
17 July 2018	RB	(England)	Todd Kane	Chelsea	31 May 2019	
31 August 2018	CB	(England)	Tommy Elphick	Aston Villa	29 December 2018	
31 August 2018	CF	(Scotland)	Chris Martin	Derby County	31 May 2019	
22 January 2019	LW	(England)	Marc Pugh	Bournemouth	25 April 2019	

=== Loans out ===
Start date	Position	Nationality	Name	To	End date	Ref.
27 July 2018	GK	(England)	Charlie Andrew	Pickering Town	30 January 2019	
9 August 2018	GK	(England)	Will Mannion	Aldershot Town	31 May 2019	
24 August 2018	GK	(England)	Callum Burton	Chesterfield	16 January 2019	
30 November 2018	CB	(England)	Adam Curry	Alfreton Town	1 January 2019	
4 January 2019	CF	(England)	Will Keane	Ipswich Town	31 May 2019	
30 January 2019	GK	(England)	Charlie Andrew	Bradford Park Avenue	31 May 2019	
2 February 2019	GK	(England)	Harrison Foulkes	Pickering Town	31 May 2019	
20 February 2019	LM	(England)	Matty Jacob	Pickering Town	31 May 2019	
8 March 2019	GK	(Wales)	David Robson	Stocksbridge Park Steels	30 April 2019	
28 March 2019	CB	(England)	Adam Curry	Alfreton Town	31 May 2019	
29 March 2019	CF	(England)	Keane Lewis-Potter	Bradford Park Avenue	31 May 2019	

== Pre-season ==
The players returned to pre-season training on 25 June 2018. On 8 July 2018 the team travelled to Portugal for a 12-day training camp. On 25 May 2018 two fixtures were confirmed as part of the Portugal trip, Maritimo on 10 July 2018 and Braga on 13 July 2018. On 31 May 2018 an away fixture against Rochdale on 21 July 2018 was announced and a home fixture against Newcastle United was announced to take place on 24 July 2018. A further away fixture against Barnsley was scheduled for 28 July 2018. The final work-out for the team was the Billy Bly Memorial Trophy against North Ferriby United that was contested at the Chadwick Stadium, North Ferriby on 30 July 2018.

Win Draw Loss

10 July 2018 Friendly	Maritimo	1–2	Hull City	Albufeira, Portugal
19:00 BST	Ibson 76'	Report	Campbell 84'; Toral 90' (pen.)	Stadium: Estadio da Nora

13 July 2018 Friendly	Braga	4–1	Hull City	Albufeira, Portugal
19:00 BST	Wilson Eduardo 24'; Raul Silva 58'; Murilo 61'; Horta 81'	Report	Ritson 67'	Stadium: Estadio da Nora

21 July 2018 Friendly	Rochdale	1–0	Hull City	Rochdale
15:00 BST	Rafferty 90'	Report		Stadium: Spotland Stadium; Attendance: 1,098

24 July 2018 Friendly	Hull City	2–2	Newcastle United	Kingston upon Hull
19:45 BST	Kane; Evandro	Report	Joselu; Pérez	Stadium: KCOM Stadium

28 July 2018 Friendly	Barnsley	1–1	Hull City	Barnsley
15:00 BST	Dougall 3'	Report	Bowen 33'	Stadium: Oakwell

30 July 2018 Friendly	North Ferriby United	0–2	Hull City	North Ferriby
19:30 BST			Campbell 74'; Holmes 81'	Stadium: Chadwick Stadium

== Competitions ==
=== Overall ===
Competition	Started round	Current position / round	Final position / round	First match	Last match
Championship	—	—	13th	21 August 2018	5 May 2019
League Cup	First round	—	Second round	14 August 2018	28 August 2018
FA Cup	Third round	—	Third round	6 January 2019	6 January 2019

Updated to match played 12 May 2019.
Source: Competitions

=== Championship ===
==== League table ====
Pos	Team	Pld	W	D	L	GF	GA	GD	Pts
10	Swansea City	46	18	11	17	65	62	+3	65
11	Brentford	46	17	13	16	73	59	+14	64 (Note: Brentford were awarded a 1–0 win over Bolton due to Bolton's inability to hold the fixture.)
12	Sheffield Wednesday	46	16	16	14	60	62	−2	64
13	Hull City	46	17	11	18	66	68	−2	62
14	Preston North End	46	16	13	17	67	67	0	61
15	Blackburn Rovers	46	16	12	18	64	69	−5	60
16	Stoke City	46	11	22	13	45	52	−7	55

Source: Sky Sports Archived 25 September 2019 at the Wayback Machine
Rules for classification: 1) Points; 2) Goal difference; 3) Number of goals scored; 4) Head-to-head results

==== Results by matchday ====
Matchday	1	2	3	4	5	6	7	8	9	10	11	12	13	14	15	16	17	18	19	20	21	22	23	24	25	26	27	28	29	30	31	32	33	34	35	36	37	38	39	40	41	42	43	44	45	46
Ground	H	A	H	A	A	H	H	A	A	H	H	A	H	A	A	H	A	H	H	A	A	H	H	A	A	H	H	A	A	H	A	H	A	H	H	A	A	H	A	H	H	A	A	H	A	H
Result	L	D	L	W	L	L	W	L	L	D	L	L	D	L	W	W	D	L	D	W	D	W	W	W	W	W	W	D	L	W	L	D	L	W	W	L	L	D	W	W	W	L	L	L	D	D
Position	22	21	22	16	19	21	17	18	21	21	21	24	23	23	23	23	22	23	22	19	19	17	16	15	14	13	10	8	12	10	12	12	13	11	10	11	13	12	12	11	9	11	10	13	13	13

Updated to match(es) played on 4 May 2019. Source: BBC Sport
A = Away; H = Home; W = Win; D = Draw; L = Loss

==== Result summary ====
Overall								Home						Away					
Pld	W	D	L	GF	GA	GD	Pts	W	D	L	GF	GA	GD	W	D	L	GF	GA	GD
46	17	11	18	66	68	−2	62	11	6	5	37	23	+14	6	5	13	29	45	−16

Last updated: 12 May 2019.
Source: BBC Sport

==== Matches ====
The fixtures for the season were announced on 21 June 2018. Hull start the season with a home match against Aston Villa, run by former manager Steve Bruce, on 6 August 2018. This being the reverse of the opening match of the previous season. The season will close on 5 May 2019 with a home match against Bristol City.

Win Draw Loss Postponed

6 August 2018 1	Hull City	1–3	Aston Villa	Kingston upon Hull
19:45 BST	Evandro 7'	Report	Elphick 14'; Elmohamady 70'; Hutton 75', (yellow card) 76'; Bjarnason (yellow card) 90'	Stadium: KCOM Stadium; Attendance: 14,071; Referee: Andrew Madley

11 August 2018 2	Sheffield Wednesday	1–1	Hull City	Owlerton, Sheffield
15:00 BST	Fox (yellow card) 44'; Forestieri 51' (pen.); Baker (yellow card) 58'; Bannan (yellow card) 74'	Report	de Wijs (yellow card) 21'; Campbell 36'	Stadium: Hillsborough Stadium; Attendance: 23,416; Referee: Stuart Attwell

18 August 2018 3	Hull City	0–1	Blackburn Rovers	Kingston upon Hull
15:00 BST	Evandro (yellow card) 68'	Report	Dack 43'; Evans (yellow card) 47'; Lenihan (yellow card) 52'; Nyambe (yellow card) 60'	Stadium: KCOM Stadium; Attendance: 12,233; Referee: David Coote

21 August 2018 4	Rotherham United	2-3	Hull City	Rotherham
19:45 BST	Wood 16'; Proctor 75'; Wood (yellow card) 86'	Report	Irvine 28', 47'; Campbell 45+1'; Henriksen (yellow card) 46'	Stadium: New York Stadium; Attendance: 8,962; Referee: Jeremy Simpson

25 August 2018 5	Stoke City	2–0	Hull City	Stoke-on-Trent
15:00 BST	McClean 9', (yellow card) 45+1' de Wijs 59' (o.g.)	Report	Evandro (yellow card) 43', (yellow card) 60' (yellow-red card)	Stadium: Bet365 Stadium; Attendance: 23,311; Referee: Darren Bond

1 September 2018 6	Hull City	1–2	Derby County	Kingston upon Hull
15:00 BST	de Wijs (yellow card) 14'; Kane 53'; Burke (yellow card) 67'	Report	Waghorn 23' (pen.); Tomori (yellow card) 78'; Jozefzoon 88'	Stadium: KCOM Stadium; Attendance: 12,285; Referee: John Brooks

15 September 2018 7	Hull City	2–0	Ipswich Town	Kingston upon Hull
15:00 BST	Bowen 3'; Campbell (yellow card) 65'; Stewart (yellow card) 74'; Irvine 89'	Report		Stadium: KCOM Stadium; Attendance: 11,650; Referee: Tony Harrington

18 September 2018 8	Wigan Athletic	2–1	Hull City	Wigan
19:45 BST	Morsy 21'; Windass (yellow card) 35', (goal) 38'	Report	Lichaj (yellow card) 30'; Bowen 43' de Wijs (yellow card) 45+2'; Campbell (yellow card) 72'	Stadium: DW Stadium; Attendance: 8,848; Referee: David Webb

22 September 2018 9	Reading	3–0	Hull City	Reading, Berkshire
15:00 BST	Baldock 4'; O'Shea (yellow card) 58', (red card) 83'; Böðvarsson 70'; Yiadom 81'	Report	Campbell (yellow card) 33'; Elphick (yellow card) 90'	Stadium: Madejski Stadium; Attendance: 12,409; Referee: Jeremy Simpson

29 September 2018 10	Hull City	1–1	Middlesbrough	Kingston upon Hull
15:00 BST	Irvine (yellow card) 37'; Henriksen (yellow card) 41'; Martin (yellow card) 64'; Bowen 69' (pen.)	Report	Assombalonga 51'; Clayton (yellow card) 63'; Flint (yellow card) 81'	Stadium: KCOM Stadium; Attendance: 13,185; Referee: Darren England

2 October 2018 11	Hull City	0–1	Leeds United	Kingston upon Hull
19:45 BST	Henriksen (yellow card) 79'	Report	Roberts 51'; Sáiz (yellow card) 57'; Douglas (yellow card) 70'; Jansson (yellow card) 80'	Stadium: KCOM Stadium; Attendance: 13,798; Referee: Darren Bond

6 October 2018 12	Sheffield United	1–0	Hull City	Sheffield
15:00 BST	Egan (yellow card) 39'; McGoldrick 70' (pen.), (yellow card) 78'	Report	Elphick (yellow card) 65'	Stadium: Bramall Lane; Attendance: 25,360; Referee: Peter Bankes

20 October 2018 13	Hull City	1–1	Preston North End	Kingston upon Hull
15:00 BST	Irvine (yellow card) 13'; Bowen 85' (pen.)	Report	Fisher (yellow card) 66'; Hughes (yellow card) 68'; Davies (yellow card) 81'; Storey (yellow card) 84'; Moult 90+3'	Stadium: KCOM Stadium; Attendance: 12,066; Referee: Gavin Ward

24 October 2018 14	Bristol City	1–0	Hull City	Bristol
19:45 BST	Webster (yellow card) 49'; Diédhiou 90+3'	Report	Lichaj (yellow card) 58'	Stadium: Ashton Gate Stadium; Attendance: 19,149; Referee: Peter Bankes

27 October 2018 15	Bolton Wanderers	0–1	Hull City	Bolton
15:00 BST	Vela (yellow card) 57'	Report	Campbell 7', (yellow card) 71'; Henriksen (yellow card) 73'	Stadium: University of Bolton Stadium; Attendance: 13,108; Referee: David Webb

3 November 2018 16	Hull City	1–0	West Bromwich Albion	Kingston upon Hull
15:00 GMT	Campbell 38' de Wijs (yellow card) 60'	Report		Stadium: KCOM Stadium; Attendance: 11,916; Referee: Keith Stroud

10 November 2018 17	Birmingham City	3–3	Hull City	Birmingham
15:00 GMT	Adams 21', 45+4', 84'; Morrison (yellow card) 90+2'	Report	Elphick (yellow card) 12'; Irvine (yellow card) 36'; Campbell 50', 61'; Grosicki 73'; Lichaj (yellow card) 82'	Stadium: St Andrew's; Attendance: 21,468; Referee: Gavin Ward

24 November 2018 18	Hull City	0–2	Nottingham Forest	Kingston upon Hull
15:00 GMT	Irvine (yellow card) 37'; Campbell (yellow card) 90+2'	Report	Grabban 61'; Lolley 64'	Stadium: KCOM Stadium; Attendance: 13,364; Referee: Graham Scott

27 November 2018 19	Hull City	0–0	Norwich City	Kingston upon Hull
19:45 GMT		Report		Stadium: KCOM Stadium; Attendance: 11,420; Referee: Geoff Eltringham

1 December 2018 20	Queens Park Rangers	2–3	Hull City	Shepherd's Bush, London
15:00 GMT	Wszołek 24'; Bidwell (yellow card) 78'; Lynch (yellow card) 87'; Freeman 90+2'	Report	Bowen 6', 69'; Henriksen 22'; Batty (yellow card) 63'	Stadium: Loftus Road Stadium; Attendance: 13,824; Referee: Jeremy Simpson

8 December 2018 21	Millwall	2–2	Hull City	Bermondsey, London
15:00 GMT	Gregory 22'; O'Brien 54'	Report	Grosicki 6'; Batty (yellow card) 68'; Henriksen 73'; Martin (yellow card) 76'	Stadium: The Den; Attendance: 12,004; Referee: Keith Stroud

15 December 2018 22	Hull City	2–0	Brentford	Kingston upon Hull
15:00 GMT	Campbell 12', 21'	Report	Jeanvier (yellow card) 56'	Stadium: KCOM Stadium; Attendance: 10,530; Referee: Andy Davies

22 December 2018 23	Hull City	3–2	Swansea City	Kingston upon Hull
17:45 GMT	Bowen (penalty missed) 39' 70', 80'; Campbell (yellow card) 59'; Elphick 76'	Report	Bony 3'; Fer (yellow card) 6' van der Hoorn (yellow card) 59'; Celina 88'	Stadium: KCOM Stadium; Attendance: 10,848; Referee: Oliver Langford

26 December 2018 24	Preston North End	1–2	Hull City	Preston
15:00 GMT	Browne 47'	Report	Irvine 28', 80'; Henriksen (yellow card) 67'	Stadium: Deepdale; Attendance: 14,026; Referee: Scott Duncan

29 December 2018 25	Leeds United	0–2	Hull City	Leeds
15:00 GMT	Forshaw (yellow card) 48'; Phillips (yellow card) 61'; Jansson (yellow card) 74'	Report	Bowen 25', 58'; Kane (yellow card) 47'; Grosicki (yellow card) 74'	Stadium: Elland Road; Attendance: 35,754; Referee: John Brooks

1 January 2019 26	Hull City	6–0	Bolton Wanderers	Kingston upon Hull
15:00 GMT	Grosicki 29', 63'; Kingsley (yellow card) 39'; Evandro 62'; Martin 67'; Bowen 76'; Dicko 83'; Henriksen (yellow card) 88'	Report	Beevers (yellow card) 82'; Grounds (yellow card) 90'	Stadium: KCOM Stadium; Attendance: 12,418; Referee: Tony Harrington

12 January 2019 27	Hull City	3–0	Sheffield Wednesday	Kingston upon Hull
15:00 GMT	Bowen 45+1', 52' (pen.); Campbell 76'	Report	Westwood (yellow card) 52'; Hutchinson (yellow card) 75'	Stadium: KCOM Stadium; Attendance: 14,102; Referee: Geoff Eltringham

19 January 2019 28	Aston Villa	2–2	Hull City	Aston, Birmingham
15:00 GMT	Chester 45'; Hourihane (yellow card) 45+4'; Bjarnason (yellow card) 58'; Abraham 64'	Report	Bowen 27', (yellow card) 84'; Evandro 37'; Stewart (yellow card) 40'; Henriksen (yellow card) 45+4'	Stadium: Villa Park; Attendance: 33,619; Referee: Darren Bond

26 January 2019 29	Blackburn Rovers	3–0	Hull City	Blackburn
15:00 GMT	Armstrong 10'; Rodwell 17'; Reed 74'; Rodwell (yellow card) 87'	Report	Grosicki (yellow card) 64'	Stadium: Ewood Park; Attendance: 13,589; Referee: Jeremy Simpson

2 February 2019 30	Hull City	2–0	Stoke City	Kingston upon Hull
15:00 GMT	Bowen 44'; Grosicki 64'; Irvine (yellow card) 82'; Kane (yellow card) 90'	Report	Vokes (penalty missed) 45+1'; Etebo (yellow card) 79'; Williams (yellow card) 85'	Stadium: KCOM Stadium; Attendance: 12,776; Referee: Peter Bankes

9 February 2019 31	Derby County	2–0	Hull City	Derby
15:00 GMT	Waghorn 41', 71'; Wilson (yellow card) 90+3'	Report	Ridgewell (yellow card) 90'	Stadium: Pride Park Stadium; Attendance: 28,211; Referee: Gavin Ward

12 February 2019 32	Hull City	2–2	Rotherham United	Kingston upon Hull
19:45 GMT	Bowen 2'; Campbell 23'	Report	Forde 48'; McKenzie 55' (o.g.); Vyner (yellow card) 90+1'	Stadium: KCOM Stadium; Attendance: 10,785; Referee: Scott Duncan

23 February 2019 33	Brentford	5–1	Hull City	Brentford
15:00 GMT	Maupay (yellow card) 22', (goal) 52'; Mokotjo 28'; Benrahma 33', 43', 81'	Report	Campbell 24'; Kane (yellow card) 58'; Henriksen (yellow card) 78'; Evandro (yellow card) 90+2'	Stadium: Griffin Park; Attendance: 9,675; Referee: Tim Robinson

26 February 2019 34	Hull City	2–1	Millwall	Kingston upon Hull
19:45 GMT	Bowen 8' (Note: Though allocated to Bowen on the day the Dubious Goals Committee indicated this should be credited to Markus Henriksen. Following an appeal by the club the committee have credited Bowen with the goal.); Pugh 42'; Lichaj (yellow card) 90+2'	Report	Marshall (yellow card) 30'; Hutchinson 34'; Cooper (yellow card) 66'	Stadium: KCOM Stadium; Attendance: 10,191; Referee: Darren Bond

2 March 2019 35	Hull City	2–0	Birmingham City	Kingston upon Hull
15:00 GMT	de Wijs (yellow card) 12'; Bowen 23', 60' (pen.); Henriksen (yellow card) 59'	Report	Gardner (yellow card) 60'	Stadium: KCOM Stadium; Attendance: 12,551; Referee: Tony Harrington

9 March 2019 36	Nottingham Forest	3–0	Hull City	West Bridgford
15:00 GMT	Yates (yellow card) 45'; Ansarifard (yellow card) 67', (goal) 76'; Carvalho 72'; Lolley 82' (pen.)	Report	Irvine (yellow card) 58'	Stadium: City Ground; Attendance: 29,397; Referee: James Linington

13 March 2019 37	Norwich City	3–2	Hull City	Norwich
19:45 GMT	Stiepermann 11'; Buendía 14', 60'; Lewis (yellow card) 49'	Report	Kane (yellow card) 35'; Pugh 45'; Burke (yellow card) 59'; Henriksen (yellow card) 65'; Martin 87'	Stadium: Carrow Road; Attendance: 25,879; Referee: Andrew Madley

16 March 2019 38	Hull City	2–2	Queens Park Rangers	Kingston upon Hull
15:00 GMT	Bowen 7', 44'; Ridgewell (yellow card) 28'; Stewart (yellow card) 90'	Report	Lynch (yellow card) 26'; Cameron (yellow card) 52'; Scowen 62'; Wszołek (yellow card) 72'; Hemed 84'	Stadium: KCOM Stadium; Attendance: 11,227; Referee: Steve Martin

30 March 2019 39	Ipswich Town	0–2	Hull City	Ipswich
15:00 GMT	Edwards (yellow card) 29'	Report	Grosicki 14', 49'; Marshall (yellow card) 64' de Wijs (yellow card) 79'	Stadium: Portman Road; Attendance: 15,720; Referee: John Brooks

6 April 2019 40	Hull City	3–1	Reading	Kingston upon Hull
15:00 BST	de Wijs (yellow card) 15'; Grosicki 53', 77'; Pugh 65'; Irvine (yellow card) 73'; Martin (yellow card) 90+2'	Report	Baker 16'; Martínez (yellow card) 45'; Blackett (yellow card) 90+4'	Stadium: KCOM Stadium; Attendance: 11,268; Referee: Tim Robinson

10 April 2019 41	Hull City	2–1	Wigan Athletic	Kingston upon Hull
19:45 BST	Kane (yellow card) 16'; Campbell 51' (yellow card) 90+4' de Wijs 89'	Report	Powell 41'; Walton (yellow card) 68'	Stadium: KCOM Stadium; Attendance: 10,827; Referee: David Webb

13 April 2019 42	Middlesbrough	1–0	Hull City	Middlesbrough
15:00 BST	Assombalonga 25'; Clayton (yellow card) 90+4'	Report	Henriksen (yellow card) 36'	Stadium: Riverside Stadium; Attendance: 22,427; Referee: Robert Jones

19 April 2019 43	West Bromwich Albion	3–2	Hull City	West Bromwich
15:00 BST	Gibbs 42'; Gayle 62', 85'	Report	Kane 48', 59'	Stadium: The Hawthorns; Attendance: 23,501; Referee: Peter Bankes

22 April 2019 44	Hull City	0–3	Sheffield United	Kingston upon Hull
15:00 BST		Report	McGoldrick 10', 22'; Stevens 42'	Stadium: KCOM Stadium; Attendance: 14,116; Referee: Graham Scott

27 April 2019 45	Swansea City	2–2	Hull City	Swansea
15:00 BST	McBurnie 37', 66'; Carter-Vickers (yellow card) 87'	Report	Henriksen (yellow card) 55'; Stewart (yellow card) 61'; Fleming (yellow card) 71'; Bowen 77'; Dicko 84'; Lichaj (yellow card) 90+2'	Stadium: Liberty Stadium; Attendance: 18,192; Referee: Geoff Eltringham

5 May 2019 46	Hull City	1–1	Bristol City	Kingston upon Hull
12:30 BST	Irvine 55'; Stewart (yellow card) 78'; Henriksen (yellow card) 90+1'	Report	Kalas (yellow card) 17'; Pack (yellow card) 29'; Henriksen 90' (o.g.)	Stadium: KCOM Stadium; Attendance: 12,165; Referee: John Brooks

=== EFL Cup ===
The draw for the first-round of the cup took place on 15 June 2018 in Ho Chi Minh City, Vietnam with the ties taking place in the week commencing 13 August 2018. Hull were in the Northern Section of the draw and were drawn away to Sheffield United. The match was played on 14 August 2018. Hull got off to a good start with Jon Toral opening the scoring on the 18-minute mark, both teams had chances to score but it was not until the 75th minute that Billy Sharp brought Sheffield level. The match finished 1–1 and a penalty shootout was required to find a winner. Sheffield got off to a bad start with Oliver Norwood missing his kick but all the other kicks were converted so Hull won 5–4 on penalties, to put them in to the second-round. The draw for the second-round took place the following day and Hull was drawn at home to Derby County, matches to take place week beginning 27 August 2018. The match took place on 28 August 2018, and Derby County got off the ground after 24-minutes when Martyn Waghorn lobbed the ball over George Long on his debut for Hull. Florian Jozefzoon scored his first goal for Derby after 38-minutes and after 73-minutes he again shot at goal which was deflected in by Brandon Fleming. Mason Mount added a fourth just before full-time, leaving Hull to exit the competition 0–4 on the night.

Win Draw Loss Postponed

14 August 2018 First round	Sheffield United	1–1 (4–5 p)	Hull City	Sheffield
19:45 BST	Sharp 75'; Freeman (yellow card) 87'	Report	Toral 18'	Stadium: Bramall Lane; Attendance: 6,327; Referee: Martin Coy
	Penalties
	Norwood (penalty missed); Sharp (penalty scored); Woodburn (penalty scored); O'Connell (penalty scored); Basham (penalty scored)		Toral (penalty scored); Keane (penalty scored); Grosicki (penalty scored); Fleming (penalty scored); Stewart (penalty scored)

28 August 2018 Second round	Hull City	0–4	Derby County	Kingston upon Hull
19:45 BST	MacDonald (yellow card) 22'; Toral (yellow card) 55'; Stewart (yellow card) 76'	Report	Wisdom (yellow card) 7'; Waghorn 24'; Jozefzoon 39'; Fleming 73' (o.g.); Mount 89'	Stadium: KCOM Stadium; Attendance: 4,666; Referee: Oliver Langford

=== FA Cup ===
The draw for the third round of the FA Cup took place at Stamford Bridge on 3 December 2018. Hull were drawn away to their next league opponents Millwall with the match taking place over the week-end of 4–7 January 2019. The match was chosen for live broadcast and scheduled for 14:00 on 6 January 2019. The first-half saw Millwall have the better of the chances but failed to capitalise. Early in the second-half Jon Toral broke the deadlock for Hull. Following a triple substitution by Millwall after 64-minutes things turned Millwall's way with substitute Shane Ferguson opening their account in the 82nd minute. Three minutes later he scored a second to give Millwall a 2–1 victory.

6 January 2019 3rd	Millwall	2–1	Hull City	Bermondsey, London
14:00 GMT	Ferguson 82', 85'	Report	Toral 52'; Mazuch (yellow card) 84'; Batty (yellow card) 90+2'	Stadium: The Den; Attendance: 5,307; Referee: Andy Woolmer

== Statistics ==
=== Appearances ===
As of 13 May 2019.

No.	Pos	Nat	Player	Total		Championship		FA Cup		League Cup	
No.	Pos	Nat	Player	Apps	Goals	Apps	Goals	Apps	Goals	Apps	Goals
1	GK	(Scotland) SCO	David Marshall	44	0	43	0	0	0	1	0
2	DF	(United States) USA	Eric Lichaj	40	0	35+4	0	1	0	0	0
3	DF	(Czech Republic) CZE	Ondřej Mazuch	7	0	3+3	0	1	0	0	0
4	DF	(Netherlands) NED	Jordy de Wijs	32	1	30+2	1	0	0	0	0
5	DF	(England) ENG	Reece Burke	35	0	32+2	0	0	0	1	0
6	MF	(England) ENG	Kevin Stewart	30	0	16+11	0	1	0	2	0
7	MF	(Brazil) BRA	Evandro	23	3	14+9	3	0	0	0	0
8	MF	(England) ENG	Marc Pugh	14	3	10+4	3	0	0	0	0
9	FW	(Mali) MLI	Nouha Dicko	19	2	1+15	2	1	0	2	0
10	MF	(Spain) ESP	Jon Toral	11	2	0+8	0	1	1	2	1
11	MF	(Serbia) SRB	David Milinković	11	0	0+8	0	1	0	0+2	0
12	GK	(England) ENG	George Long	6	0	3+1	0	1	0	1	0
13	GK	(England) ENG	Callum Burton	0	0	0	0	0	0	0	0
14	MF	(Poland) POL	Kamil Grosicki	40	9	35+4	9	0	0	0+1	0
15	DF	(England) ENG	Angus MacDonald	4	0	1+1	0	0	0	2	0
16	MF	(Australia) AUS	Jackson Irvine	39	6	36+2	6	0	0	1	0
17	DF	(England) ENG	Todd Kane	41	3	36+3	3	1	0	1	0
18	MF	(England) ENG	Daniel Batty	29	0	22+5	0	1	0	1	0
19	FW	(England) ENG	Will Keane	10	0	1+7	0	0	0	2	0
20	FW	(England) ENG	Jarrod Bowen	46	22	45+1	22	0	0	0	0
21	DF	(England) ENG	Brandon Fleming	6	0	2+2	0	0	0	2	0
22	MF	(Norway) NOR	Markus Henriksen	39	2	39	2	0	0	0	0
23	DF	(Scotland) SCO	Stephen Kingsley	27	0	25+1	0	0	0	0+1	0
24	MF	(England) ENG	James Weir	0	0	0	0	0	0	0	0
25	FW	(England) ENG	Fraizer Campbell	39	12	31+8	12	0	0	0	0
26	DF	(England) ENG	Adam Curry	2	0	0	0	0	0	2	0
27	DF	(England) ENG	Robbie McKenzie	21	0	10+8	0	1	0	2	0
28	MF	(England) ENG	Max Sheaf	3	0	0+1	0	0+1	0	0+1	0
29	FW	(Scotland) SCO	Chris Martin	31	2	15+15	2	1	0	0	0
34	FW	(England) ENG	Keane Lewis-Potter	1	0	0	0	0+1	0	0	0
35	DF	(England) ENG	Tommy Elphick	18	1	18	1	0	0	0	0
36	DF	(England) ENG	Liam Ridgewell	7	0	4+3	0	0	0	0	0
–	GK	(England) ENG	Will Mannion	0	0	0	0	0	0	0	0

- Source: Compiled from competitive match reports

Note: Appearances shown after a "+" indicate player came on during course of match.

=== Top scorers ===
Player	Number	Position	Championship	FA Cup	League Cup	Total
(England) Jarrod Bowen	20	MF	22	0	0	22
(England) Fraizer Campbell	25	FW	12	0	0	12
(Poland) Kamil Grosicki	14	MF	9	0	0	9
(Australia) Jackson Irvine	16	MF	6	0	0	6
(Brazil) Evandro	7	MF	3	0	0	3
(England) Todd Kane	17	DF	3	0	0	3
(England) Marc Pugh	8	MF	3	0	0	3
(Mali) Nouha Dicko	9	FW	2	0	0	2
(Norway) Markus Henriksen	22	MF	2	0	0	2
(Scotland) Chris Martin	29	FW	2	0	0	2
(Spain) Jon Toral	10	MF	0	1	1	2
(England) Tommy Elphick	35	DF	1	0	0	1
(Netherlands) Jordy de Wijs	4	DF	1	0	0	1
Total			66	1	1	68

=== Disciplinary record ===
Player	Number	Position	Championship		FA Cup		League Cup		Total	
Player	Number	Position	Yellow card	Red card	Yellow card	Red card	Yellow card	Red card	Yellow card	Red card
(Brazil) Evandro	7	MF	3	1	0	0	0	0	3	1
(Norway) Markus Henriksen	22	MF	13	0	0	0	0	0	13	0
(England) Fraizer Campbell	25	FW	7	0	0	0	0	0	7	0
(Australia) Jackson Irvine	16	MF	7	0	0	0	0	0	7	0
(Netherlands) Jordy de Wijs	4	DF	7	0	0	0	0	0	7	0
(England) Todd Kane	17	DF	5	0	0	0	0	0	5	0
(United States) Eric Lichaj	2	DF	5	0	0	0	0	0	5	0
(England) Kevin Stewart	6	MF	5	0	0	0	1	0	6	0
(England) Daniel Batty	18	MF	2	0	1	0	0	0	3	0
(England) Tommy Elphick	35	MF	3	0	0	0	0	0	3	0
(Scotland) Chris Martin	29	FW	3	0	0	0	0	0	3	0
(England) Reece Burke	5	DF	2	0	0	0	0	0	2	0
(Poland) Kamil Grosicki	14	MF	2	0	0	0	0	0	2	0
(England) Liam Ridgewell	36	DF	2	0	0	0	0	0	2	0
(England) Jarrod Bowen	20	MF	1	0	0	0	0	0	1	0
(England) Brandon Fleming	21	MF	1	0	0	0	0	0	1	0
(Scotland) Stephen Kingsley	23	DF	1	0	0	0	0	0	1	0
(England) Angus MacDonald	15	DF	0	0	0	0	1	0	1	0
(Scotland) David Marshall	1	GK	1	0	0	0	0	0	1	0
(Czech Republic) Ondřej Mazuch	3	DF	0	0	1	0		0	1	0
(Spain) Jon Toral	10	MF	0	0	0	0	1	0	1	0
Total			70	1	2	0	3	0	75	1

== Kits ==
The home kit for the 2018–19 season was unveiled on 8 June 2018, manufactured by Umbro, the shirt is a traditional black and amber vertical striped design, complemented by black with amber trim shorts and amber socks with black bands. The away kit was unveiled on 20 July 2018 as all black with amber trim. The third kit was revealed on 13 August 2018, as all white shirts and socks with Sulphur Spring detailing. With the shorts being Sulphur Spring. SportPesa is the shirt sponsor and in March 2019 it was announced that this sponsorship would be extended to the 2019–20 season.

== Awards ==
The annual awards for the club took place on 7 May 2019 and saw Jarrod Bowen pick-up the Player of the Year, Players' Player of the Year and Supporters' Player of the Year awards. Evandro Goebel was presented with the Goal of the Season award for his goal against Aston Villa on 19 January 2019. Keane Lewis-Potter took the award for Academy Player of the Year.
