= 2020–21 Barrow A.F.C. season =

Barrow
2020–21 season
- Chairman: Paul Hornby
- Manager: David Dunn (until 13 December); Michael Jolley (23 December to 21 February)
- Stadium: Holker Street
- League Two: 21st
- FA Cup: First round
- EFL Cup: First round
- EFL Trophy: Group stage
- Top goalscorer: League: Scott Quigley (14); All: Scott Quigley (14)
Home colours	Away colours

The 2020–21 season was Barrow's 119th year in existence and their first season in League Two having gained promotion from the National League in 2020 ending a 48 year exile from the Football League. Along with League Two, the club also participated in the FA Cup, EFL Cup and EFL Trophy.

The season covers the period from 1 July 2020 to 30 June 2021.

== Transfers ==
=== Transfers in ===
Date	Position	Nationality	Name	From	Fee	Ref.
20 July 2020	CB	(Australia)	Tom Beadling	(Scotland) Dunfermline Athletic	Free transfer	
20 July 2020	CF	(England)	Luke James	(England) Hartlepool United	Free transfer	
20 July 2020	CM	(England)	Mike Jones	(England) Carlisle United	Free transfer	
29 July 2020	CB	(England)	Matthew Platt	(England) Blackburn Rovers	Undisclosed	
31 July 2020	CB	(Wales)	James Jones	(England) Altrincham	Undisclosed	
2 August 2020	AM	(England)	Callum Gribbin	(England) Sheffield United	Free transfer	
4 August 2020	LB	(Northern Ireland)	Bobby Burns	(Scotland) Heart of Midlothian	Free transfer	
3 September 2020	LB	(South Africa)	Kgosi Ntlhe	(England) Scunthorpe United	Free transfer	
4 September 2020	CB	(England)	Scott Wilson	(England) Burnley	Free transfer	
12 September 2020	GK	(England)	Josh Lillis	(England) Rochdale	Free transfer	
17 September 2020	GK	(England)	Scott Moloney	(England) Huddersfield Town	Free transfer	
1 October 2020	CB	(France)	Yoan Zouma	(England) Bolton Wanderers	Free transfer	
5 October 2020	LM	(England)	Chris Taylor	(England) Bradford City	Free transfer	
8 October 2020	CF	(England)	Courtney Baker-Richardson	(Wales) Swansea City	Free transfer	
28 October 2020	CF	(France)	Dimitri Sea	(England) Aston Villa	Free transfer	
18 January 2021	CM	(England)	Ollie Banks	(England) Tranmere Rovers	Undisclosed	
19 January 2021	AM	(Republic of Ireland)	Jamie Devitt	(England) Blackpool	Free transfer	
28 January 2021	LB	(Wales)	Dion Donohue	(England) Swindon Town	Free transfer	
2 February 2021	CF	(England)	Mikael Ndjoli	(England) Bournemouth	Undisclosed	
23 March 2021	CF	(England)	Calvin Andrew	Unattached	Free transfer	

=== Loans in ===
Date from	Position	Nationality	Name	From	Date until	Ref.
28 August 2020	CM	(England)	Harrison Biggins	(England) Fleetwood Town	1 February 2021	
16 October 2020	FW	(England)	Jayden Reid	(England) Birmingham City	5 January 2021	
14 January 2021	RB	(Wales)	Neal Eardley	(England) Burton Albion	End of season	
18 January 2021	RM	(Scotland)	Daniel Bramall	(England) Barnsley	End of season	
18 January 2021	CB	(England)	Tom Davies	(England) Bristol Rovers	End of season	
22 January 2021	CB	(England)	Bobby Thomas	(England) Burnley	End of season	
2 February 2021	CM	(England)	Mace Goodridge	(England) Burnley	End of season	

=== Loans out ===
Date from	Position	Nationality	Name	From	Date until	Ref.
2 October 2020	CF	(England)	Morgan Penfold	(England) FC United of Manchester	3 January 2021	
3 October 2020	LB	(Northern Ireland)	Bobby Burns	(Northern Ireland) Glentoran	End of season	
24 October 2020	CF	(England)	Jack Hindle	(England) South Shields	1 January 2021	
28 January 2021	CF	(England)	Courtney Baker-Richardson	(England) Barnet	End of season	
1 March 2021	CB	(France)	Yoan Zouma	(England) Altrincham	End of season	

=== Transfers out ===
Date	Position	Nationality	Name	To	Fee	Ref.
1 July 2020	CB	(England)	Matthew Elsdon	(England) Blyth Spartans	Released	
1 July 2020	CB	(England)	Josh Granite	(England) Buxton	Released	
1 July 2020	CF	(England)	Byron Harrison	(England) Altrincham	Released	
1 July 2020	GK	(England)	Jonathan Saltmer	(England) Darlington	Released	
1 July 2020	GK	(England)	Luke Simpson	(England) Kidderminster Harriers	Released	
1 July 2020	CM	(England)	Mark Waddington	Unattached	Released	
20 July 2020	AM	(England)	John Rooney	(England) Stockport County	Undisclosed	
3 January 2021	FW	(England)	Jack Hindle	Unattached	Released	
1 February 2021	FW	(England)	Dior Angus	(Wales) Wrexham	Released	
24 March 2021	CM	(England)	Lewis Hardcastle	Retired	—N/a	

== Pre-season ==
15 August 2020 Friendly	Holker Old Boys	0–4	Barrow	Barrow-in-Furness
15:00 BST		Report	Hardcastle 37'; Hindle 38', 40'; James 80'	Stadium: Rakesmoor; Attendance: 0

18 August 2020 Friendly	Blackpool	2–1	Barrow	Blackpool
13:00 BST	Thorniley 38'; Virtue 83'	Report	Angus 72'	Stadium: Bloomfield Road; Attendance: 0

22 August 2020 Friendly	FC United of Manchester	2–2	Barrow	Moston
12:45 BST	Morris 20' van Wyk 72'	Report	Hindle 64'; Quigley 65'	Stadium: Broadhurst Park; Attendance: 150

29 August 2020 Friendly	Southport	0–2	Barrow	Blowick
15:00 BST			Platt 51'; Quigley 90'	Stadium: Haig Avenue

== Competitions ==
=== League Two ===
==== League table ====
Pos	Team	Pld	W	D	L	GF	GA	GD	Pts	Promotion, qualification or relegation
17	Harrogate Town	46	16	9	21	52	61	−9	57	
18	Oldham Athletic	46	15	9	22	72	81	−9	54	
19	Walsall	46	11	20	15	45	53	−8	53	
20	Colchester United	46	11	18	17	44	61	−17	51	
21	Barrow	46	13	11	22	53	59	−6	50	
22	Scunthorpe United	46	13	9	24	41	64	−23	48	
23	Southend United (R)	46	10	15	21	29	58	−29	45	Relegation to National League
24	Grimsby Town (R)	46	10	13	23	37	69	−32	43	Relegation to National League

Updated to match(es) played on 31 May 2021. Source: EFL Official Website
Rules for classification: 1) Points; 2) Goal difference; 3) Number of goals scored; 4) Head-to-head results; 5) Wins; 6) Away goals; 7) Penalty points (sec 9.5); 8) 12-point sending off offences
(R) Relegated

==== Results summary ====
Overall								Home						Away					
Pld	W	D	L	GF	GA	GD	Pts	W	D	L	GF	GA	GD	W	D	L	GF	GA	GD
46	13	11	22	53	59	−6	50	7	8	8	32	32	0	6	3	14	21	27	−6

Last updated: 8 May 2021.
Source: BBC

==== Results by matchday ====
Matchday	1	2	3	4	5	6	7	8	9	10	11	12	13	14	15	16	17	18	19	20	21	22	23	24	25	26	27	28	29	30	31	32	33	34	35	36	37	38	39	40	41	42	43	44	45	46
Ground	H	A	H	A	H	A	H	H	A	H	A	A	H	H	A	H	A	A	H	A	H	A	H	A	H	A	H	A	A	H	H	A	A	H	H	A	H	A	H	H	A	H	A	A	H	A
Result	D	L	D	L	D	L	D	D	W	W	L	D	D	L	L	L	L	L	W	W	D	L	W	L	L	L	L	W	L	L	W	W	W	W	L	L	W	D	D	W	L	L	L	W	L	D
Position	12	17	19	21	21	22	21	19	18	15	15	18	18	19	21	21	21	22	22	21	20	21	20	22	22	23	23	23	23	23	22	22	22	21	22	22	21	21	21	20	21	22	22	20	21	21

Updated to match(es) played on 8 May 2021. Source: 11v11 for league tables and fixtures
A = Away; H = Home; W = Win; D = Draw; L = Loss

==== Matches ====
Win Draw Loss Postponed

The 2020–21 season fixtures were released on 21 August.

12 September 2020 1	Barrow	1–1	Stevenage	Barrow-in-Furness
15:00 BST	Angus 12' (pen.); Beadling (yellow card) 44'	Report	Newton (yellow card) 11'; Effiong 85' (pen.)	Stadium: Holker Street; Attendance: 0 Referee: Scott Oldham

19 September 2020 2	Newport County	2–1	Barrow	Newport
15:00 BST	Howkins (yellow card) 12'; Shepherd 19'; Taylor 48'; Abrahams (yellow card) 90+8'	Report	Hardcastle 28'; Jones (yellow card) 57'; Brown (yellow card) 71'; Jones (yellow card) 90+5'	Stadium: Rodney Parade; Attendance: 0 Referee: Robert Lewis

26 September 2020 3	Barrow	1–1	Colchester United	Barrow-in-Furness
15:00 BST	Jones 54'; Beadling (yellow card) 57'	Report	Chilvers 34'; Welch-Hayes (yellow card) 54'; Smith (yellow card) 90'; Cowan-Hall (yellow card) 90+2'	Stadium: Holker Street; Attendance: 0 Referee: Sam Barrott

3 October 2020 4	Carlisle United	1–0	Barrow	Carlisle
15:00 BST	Mellish (yellow card) 10' (goal) 24'; Hayden (red card) 51'; Anderton (yellow card) 70'; Guy (yellow card) 90+1'	Report	Quigley (yellow card) 75'; Brough (yellow card) 80'; Hardcastle (yellow card) 90+4'; Kay (yellow card) 90+7'	Stadium: Brunton Park; Attendance: 0 Referee: Ben Toner

10 October 2020 5	Barrow	1–1	Leyton Orient	Barrow-in-Furness
15:00 BST	Kay 16' (yellow card) 68'; Hardcastle (yellow card) 61'; Beadling (yellow card) 82'; Angus (yellow card) 83'	Report	Ling (yellow card) 7'; Happe (red card) 9'; Johnson 50' (yellow card) 61'; Cissé (yellow card) 61'; Dennis (yellow card) 63'; McAnuff (yellow card) 76'; Wilkinson (yellow card) 87'	Stadium: Holker Street; Attendance: 0 Referee: Andy Haines

17 October 2020 6	Harrogate Town	1–0	Barrow	Harrogate
15:00 BST	Muldoon 22'	Report	Zouma (yellow card) 51'; Barry (yellow card) 74'	Stadium: Wetherby Road; Attendance: 0 Referee: Declan Bourne

20 October 2020 7	Barrow	3–3	Bolton Wanderers	Barrow-in-Furness
19:00 BST	Taylor 1'; Jones 4' (yellow card) 45+4'; Angus 20'; Zouma (yellow card) 57'; Barry (yellow card) 66'; Brown (yellow card) 90+3'	Report	Kioso 16'; Brockbank (yellow card) 28'; Doyle 41'; Comley (yellow card) 56'; Sarcevic 90+5'	Stadium: Holker Street; Attendance: 0 Referee: Peter Wright

24 October 2020 8	Barrow	2–2	Walsall	Barrow-in-Furness
15:00 BST	Jones (yellow card) 20'; Angus 25' (pen.) (yellow card) 26'; James 50'; Kay (yellow card) 57'	Report	Lavery 45+1', 58' (pen.) (yellow card) 63'; Jules (yellow card) 84'	Stadium: Holker Street; Attendance: 0 Referee: Bobby Madley

27 October 2020 9	Mansfield Town	2–4	Barrow	Mansfield
19:00 GMT	O'Driscoll (yellow card) 21' (yellow-red card) 51'; Perch 35'; Charsley 89'	Report	Barry 10' (yellow card) 90+2'; Platt (yellow card) 15'; Brough 23'; Kay (yellow card) 43' (goal) 61', 79'	Stadium: Field Mill; Attendance: 0 Referee: Keith Stroud

31 October 2020 10	Barrow	1–0	Bradford City	Barrow-in-Furness
18:46 GMT	Connor Brown 18' Chris Taylor (yellow card) 85'	Report	Levi Sutton (red card) 37' Finn Cousin-Dawson (yellow card) 70' Reece Staunton (yellow card) 90+4'	Stadium: Holker Street; Attendance: 0 Referee: Ben Speedie

3 November 2020 11	Grimsby Town	1–0	Barrow	Grimsby
19:00 GMT	Gibson 60'; Waterfall (yellow card) 77'; McKeown (yellow card) 89'	Report	Hird (yellow card) 41'; Platt (yellow card) 71'	Stadium: Blundell Park; Attendance: 0 Referee: Alan Young

14 November 2020 12	Cambridge United	1–1	Barrow	Cambridge
15:00 GMT	Boateng (yellow card) 13'; Taylor (yellow card) 15'; Ironside 56'; Hannant (yellow card) 66'	Report	Kay (yellow card) 7'; Platt 90+6'	Stadium: Abbey Stadium; Attendance: 0 Referee: Josh Smith

21 November 2020 13	Barrow	2–2	Forest Green Rovers	Barrow-in-Furness
15:00 GMT	Taylor (yellow card) 71'; James 73'; Angus 83' (pen.)	Report	Whitehouse 52'; Moore-Taylor (yellow card) 62'; Kitching (yellow card) 86'; Cadden 90+6'	Stadium: Holker Street; Attendance: 0 Referee: Christopher Sarginson

24 November 2020 14	Barrow	3–4	Oldham Athletic	Barrow-in-Furness
19:00 GMT	Quigley 16'; Biggins (yellow card) 54'; Barry (yellow card) 57'; Platt 79'; Kay (yellow card) 87'; Piergianni 90+9' (o.g.)	Report	Garrity 39'; Rowe 45+2', 82' (pen.); Diarra (yellow card) 58'; Borthwick-Jackson (yellow card) 72'; McAleny 90+5'	Stadium: Holker Street; Attendance: 0 Referee: Declan Bourne

1 December 2020 15	Morecambe	1–0	Barrow	Morecambe
18:30 GMT	Mendes Gomes 12'; Davis (yellow card) 25'; Songo'o (yellow card) 70'	Report	Hird (red card) 15'	Stadium: Globe Arena; Attendance: 0 Referee: Thomas Bramall

5 December 2020 16	Barrow	0–1	Salford City	Barrow-in-Furness
15:00 GMT	Quigley (yellow card) 21'	Report	Clarke (yellow card) 7'; Hunter 49'; Towell (yellow card) 80'; Smith (yellow card) 90+3'; Lowe (yellow card) 90+4'	Stadium: Holker Street; Attendance: 819; Referee: Tom Nield

12 December 2020 17	Crawley Town	4–2	Barrow	Crawley
15:00 GMT	Watters 23', 58', 90+3'; Craig (yellow card) 33'; Frost (yellow card) 38'; Hessenthaler (yellow card) 47'; Nichols 81' (pen.)	Report	Brown (yellow card) 33' (yellow-red card) 68'; Kay (penalty missed) 33' 33'; Hird 50'; Platt (yellow card) 90+2'	Stadium: Broadfield Stadium; Attendance: 650; Referee: Neil Hair

15 December 2020 18	Scunthorpe United	2–1	Barrow	Scunthorpe
19:00 GMT	Eisa 13'; Clarke (yellow card) 31' (goal) 90+1'; Bedeau (yellow card) 81'	Report	Quigley 16'; Wilson (yellow card) 33'; Beadling (yellow card) 90+1'	Stadium: Glanford Park; Attendance: 0 Referee: Will Finnie

19 December 2020 19	Barrow	3–0	Cheltenham Town	Barrow-in-Furness
15:00 GMT	Quigley 43' (pen.); James 52'; Brown (yellow card) 73'; Biggins 74'	Report	Clements (yellow card) 19'; Boyle (yellow card) 41'; Hussey (yellow card) 76'	Stadium: Holker Street; Attendance: 1,363; Referee: Marc Edwards

26 December 2020 20	Port Vale	0–2	Barrow	Burslem
15:00 GMT	Amoo (yellow card) 89'	Report	James (yellow card) 15'; Beadling (yellow card) 19'; Quigley 23'; Brough 50'	Stadium: Vale Park; Attendance: 0 Referee: Sam Barrott

29 December 2020 21	Barrow	1–1	Tranmere Rovers	Barrow-in-Furness
19:45 GMT	Brough (yellow card) 45+1'; Biggins (yellow card) 53' (yellow-red card) 68'; Quigley 65' (pen.)	Report	Vaughan 23' (yellow card) 68'; Feeney (yellow card) 60'	Stadium: Holker Street; Attendance: 1,131; Referee: James Bell

9 January 2021 22	Southend United	1–0	Barrow	Southend-on-Sea
15:00 GMT	Hackett-Fairchild 3'; Halford (yellow card) 17' (yellow-red card) 52'; Oxley (yellow card) 79'	Report	Hird (yellow card) 54'; Kay (yellow card) 83'	Stadium: Roots Hall; Attendance: 0 Referee: Christopher Pollard

16 January 2021 23	Barrow	1–0	Scunthorpe United	Barrow-in-Furness
15:00 GMT	Platt (yellow card) 36'; Kay 58', (yellow card) 90+17'; Quigley (yellow card) 90+10'	Report	Brown (yellow card) 28' (yellow-red card) 86'; Clarke (yellow card) 77'	Stadium: Holker Street; Attendance: 0 Referee: Chris Sarginson

30 January 2021 24	Bradford City	2–1	Barrow	Bradford
15:00 GMT	Rowe 5'; O'Connor (yellow card) 36'; Cooke 49'	Report	Quigley 37' (pen.); Kay (yellow card) 90'	Stadium: Valley Parade; Attendance: 0 Referee: Antony Coggins

6 February 2021 25	Barrow	0–2	Cambridge United	Barrow-in-Furness
15:00 GMT	Davies (yellow card) 73'; Donohue (yellow card) 90+1'	Report	Mullin 43'; Ironside 84'; O'Neil (yellow card) 90+3'	Stadium: Holker Street; Attendance: 0 Referee: Graham Salisbury

16 February 2021 26	Salford City	1–0	Barrow	Salford
19:00 GMT	Henderson 29'; Hunter (yellow card) 70'; Coutts (yellow card) 90+6'	Report	Thomas (yellow card) 74'; Banks (yellow card) 81'	Stadium: Moor Lane; Attendance: 0 Referee: Trevor Kettle

20 February 2021 27	Barrow	1–2	Morecambe	Barrow-in-Furness
15:00 GMT	Banks (yellow card) 21'; Jones (yellow card) 26'; Quigley 65'	Report	Wildig 24'; Lavelle (yellow card) 52'; Songo'o (yellow card) 63'; Mellor 66'	Stadium: Holker Street; Attendance: 0 Referee: Thomas Bramall

23 February 2021 28	Oldham Athletic	0–1	Barrow	Oldham
19:00 GMT	Vaughan (yellow card) 90+4'	Report	Dixon (yellow card) 84'; Quigley 89'	Stadium: Boundary Park; Attendance: 0 Referee: Michael Salisbury

27 February 2021 29	Bolton Wanderers	1–0	Barrow	Horwich
15:00 GMT	Miller 90+3'	Report	Brough (yellow card) 43'; Dixon (yellow card) 65'	Stadium: University of Bolton Stadium; Attendance: 0 Referee: Bobby Madley

2 March 2021 30	Barrow	0–1	Harrogate Town	Barrow-in-Furness
19:00 GMT	Brough (yellow card) 86'	Report	Kerry (yellow card) 28'; Smith (yellow card) 45'; Muldoon 84'	Stadium: Holker Street; Attendance: 0 Referee: Robert Lewis

6 March 2021 31	Barrow	2–0	Mansfield Town	Barrow-in-Furness
15:00 GMT	Brough 74', 77'	Report	Gordon (yellow card) 73'; Sweeney (yellow card) 46' (yellow-red card) 63'; Clarke (yellow card) 26'; Reid (yellow card) 81'	Stadium: Holker Street; Attendance: 0 Referee: Carl Boyeson

12 March 2021 32	Walsall	0–1	Barrow	Bescot
19:00 GMT	Scarr (yellow card) 29'; Osadebe (yellow card) 45'; Sadler (yellow card) 80'	Report	Kay 87'; Quigley (yellow card) 90+4'	Stadium: Bescot Stadium; Attendance: 0 Referee: Carl Brook

16 March 2021 33	Cheltenham Town	0–2	Barrow	Cheltenham
19:00 GMT		Report	Jones 2'; Kay (yellow card) 28'; Davies (yellow card) 61'; Long 66' (o.g.)	Stadium: Whaddon Road; Attendance: 0 Referee: James Bell

20 March 2021 34	Barrow	3–2	Crawley Town	Barrow-in-Furness
15:00 GMT	Davies 10'; Quigley 36' (pen.); Beadling (yellow card) 90+2'; Taylor 90+5'	Report	Francomb 31'; Powell 84'	Stadium: Holker Street; Attendance: 0 Referee: Scott Oldham

23 March 2021 35	Barrow	0–1	Grimsby Town	Barrow-in-Furness
19:00 GMT		Report	John-Lewis (yellow card) 62'; Spokes 71'	Stadium: Holker Street; Attendance: 0 Referee: Ben Speedie

27 March 2021 36	Stevenage	2–1	Barrow	Stevenage
15:00 GMT	List 53'; Norris 87' (pen.)	Report	Banks (yellow card) 68'; Andrew 78'; Kay (yellow card) 87'; Barry (yellow card) 87'	Stadium: Broadhall Way; Attendance: 0 Referee: James Adcock

2 April 2021 37	Barrow	2–1	Newport County	Barrow-in-Furness
15:00 BST	Quigley 56'; Devitt 84'	Report	Bennett 24'; Labadie (yellow card) 43'; Demetriou (yellow card) 78' (yellow-red card) 89'	Stadium: Holker Street; Attendance: 0 Referee: Lee Mason

5 April 2021 38	Colchester United	1–1	Barrow	Colchester
15:00 BST	Harriott 33'	Report	Taylor (yellow card) 82'; Beadling 88'	Stadium: Colchester Community Stadium; Attendance: 0 Referee: John Busby

10 April 2021 39	Barrow	2–2	Carlisle United	Barrow-in-Furness
15:00 BST	Quigley 19', (yellow card) 73'; Brough 24'; Eardley (yellow card) 25'	Report	Armer 3', (yellow card) 30'; Tanner (yellow card) 52'; Mellish (yellow card) 66'; Zanzala 79' (pen.)	Stadium: Holker Street; Attendance: 0 Referee: Seb Stockbridge

13 April 2021 40	Barrow	2–1	Exeter City	Barrow-in-Furness
19:00 BST	Brough 45+2', (yellow card) 69'; Ntlhe (yellow card) 62'; Quigley (yellow card) 89', (goal) 90+1'	Report	Atangana (yellow card) 10'; Sweeney 90+4'	Stadium: Holker Street; Attendance: 0 Referee: Ross Joyce

17 April 2021 41	Leyton Orient	2–0	Barrow	Leyton
12:30 BST	Happe 52'; Kemp 63'	Report	Brough (yellow card) 34'	Stadium: Brisbane Road; Attendance: 0 Referee: Chris Sarginson

20 April 2021 42	Barrow	0–2	Port Vale	Barrow-in-Furness
19:00 BST	Barry (yellow card) 7'; Beadling (yellow card) 59'; Ntlhe (yellow card) 88'	Report	Brisley (yellow card) 7'; Montaño (yellow card) 8'; Conlon 30', 76'; Guthrie (yellow card) 51' Darrell Clarke (yellow card)	Stadium: Holker Street; Attendance: 0 Referee: Andy Haines

24 April 2021 43	Tranmere Rovers	1–0	Barrow	Birkenhead
15:00 BST	Nugent 67'; Clarke (yellow card) 82'	Report	Banks (yellow card) 82'; Ntlhe (yellow card) 82'; Thomas (yellow card) 90+3'	Stadium: Prenton Park; Attendance: 0 Referee: Marc Edwards

27 April 2021 44	Forest Green Rovers	0–2	Barrow	Nailsworth
19:00 BST	Cargill (yellow card) 45+1'; Adams (yellow card) 48'; Stokes (yellow card) 51'; Bernard (yellow card) 76'	Report	Quigley 18' (pen.); Thomas 25'; Beadling (yellow card) 72'	Stadium: The New Lawn; Attendance: 0 Referee: Paul Howard

1 May 2021 45	Barrow	1–2	Southend United	Barrow-in-Furness
15:00 BST	Quigley 19'; Kay (yellow card) 29'; Thomas (yellow card) 61'; Ntlhe (yellow card) 65'; Andrew (yellow card) 79'; Brown (yellow card) 90+5'	Report	White 30'; Cordner (yellow card) 40'; Hart (yellow card) 45'; Egbri 52'	Stadium: Furness Building Society Stadium; Attendance: 0 Referee: Martin Coy

8 May 2021 46	Exeter City	1–1	Barrow	Exeter
15:00 BST	Jay 25'; Collins (yellow card) 67'	Report	Beadling 56'; Taylor (yellow card) 67'; Brough (yellow card) 77'	Stadium: St James Park; Attendance: 0 Referee: Ben Toner

=== FA Cup ===
The draw for the first round was made on Monday 26, October.

Win Draw Loss

26 November 2020 First round	Barrow	0–0 (a.e.t.) (2–4 p)	AFC Wimbledon	Barrow-in-Furness
19:45 GMT	Gribbin (yellow card) 40'; Hird (yellow card) 58'; Kay (yellow card) 90+5'	Report	Nightingale (yellow card) 35'; Palmer (yellow card) 57'; Guinness-Walker (yellow card) 83'	Stadium: Holker Street; Attendance: 0 Referee: Seb Stockbridge
	Penalties
	Angus (penalty missed); Quigley (penalty missed); Kay (penalty scored); Brough (penalty scored)		Longman (penalty scored); McLoughlin (penalty scored); Seddon (penalty scored); Rudoni (penalty scored)

=== EFL Cup ===
Win Draw Loss

The first round draw was made on 18 August, live on Sky Sports, by Paul Merson.

5 September 2020 First round	Derby County	0–0 (3–2 p)	Barrow	Derby
12:00 BST		Report	Brown (yellow card) 44'; Jones (yellow card) 72'	Stadium: Pride Park Stadium; Attendance: 0 Referee: Ollie Yates
	Penalties
	Evans (penalty scored); Marriott (penalty missed); Bird (penalty missed); Shinnie (penalty missed); Whittaker (penalty scored)		Angus (penalty scored); Beadling (penalty missed); Hardcastle (penalty missed); Biggins (penalty scored); Hindle (penalty missed)

=== EFL Trophy ===
Win Draw Loss

The regional group stage draw was confirmed on 18 August.

Pos	Div	Team	Pld	W	PW	PL	L	GF	GA	GD	Pts	Qualification
1	L1	Accrington Stanley	3	2	1	0	0	9	1	+8	8	Advance to Round 2
2	L1	Blackpool	3	1	1	1	0	4	1	+3	6	Advance to Round 2
3	L2	Barrow	3	0	1	1	1	2	3	−1	3	
4	ACA	Leeds United U21	3	0	0	1	2	2	12	−10	1	

Source: EFL.com

8 September 2020 Group stage	Blackpool	0–0 (5–3 p)	Barrow	Blackpool
19:00 BST	Robson (yellow card) 48'	Report		Stadium: Bloomfield Road; Attendance: 0 Referee: Martin Coy
	Penalties
	Yates (penalty scored); Lubala (penalty scored); Anderson (penalty scored); Ward (penalty scored); Kemp (penalty scored)		Quigley (penalty scored); Brown (penalty missed); Gribbin (penalty scored); Taylor (penalty scored)

5 October 2020 Group stage	Barrow	2–2 (4–3 p)	Leeds United U21	Barrow-in-Furness
19:45 BST	Gribbin (yellow card) 27'; Brown (yellow card) 45'; Angus 62'; J. Taylor 80'	Report	Dean 11', 38'; Drameh (yellow card) 32'; Casey (yellow card) 51'; Summerville (yellow card) 72'; Davis (yellow card) 82'	Stadium: Holker Street; Attendance: 0 Referee: Marc Edwards
	Penalties
	Angus (penalty scored); James (penalty scored); J. Taylor (penalty missed); Hird (penalty missed); Kay (penalty scored); C. Taylor (penalty scored)		Summerville (penalty scored); Shackleton (penalty missed); Galloway (penalty scored); Gibbon (penalty missed); Dean (penalty scored); Jenkins (penalty missed)

10 November 2020 Group stage	Barrow	0–1	Accrington Stanley	Barrow-in-Furness
19:00 GMT	Quigley (penalty missed) 11'; Taylor (yellow card) 60'; Ntlhe (yellow card) 62'	Report	Mansell 4'; Barclay (yellow card) 7'; Burgess (yellow card) 79'; Scully (yellow card) 88'	Stadium: Holker Street; Attendance: 0 Referee: James Bell

== Statistics ==
=== Appearances and goals ===
Last updated 10 May 2021.

No.	Pos	Nat	Player	Total		EFL League Two		EFL Cup		EFL Trophy		FA Cup	
No.	Pos	Nat	Player	Apps	Goals	Apps	Goals	Apps	Goals	Apps	Goals	Apps	Goals
Goalkeepers
1	GK	(England) ENG	Joel Dixon	48	0	46	0	1	0	1	0	0	0
12	GK	(England) ENG	Josh Lillis	3	0	0	0	0	0	2	0	1	0
21	GK	(England) ENG	Scott Moloney	0	0	0	0	0	0	0	0	0	0
Defenders
2	DF	(England) ENG	Connor Brown	24	1	19	1	1	0	3	0	1	0
3	DF	(England) ENG	Patrick Brough	45	6	43	6	0	0	1	0	1	0
5	DF	(England) ENG	Matthew Platt	25	2	24	2	1	0	0	0	0	0
6	DF	(England) ENG	Sam Hird	19	1	15	1	1	0	2	0	1	0
14	DF	(Wales) WAL	James Jones	23	1	21	1	1	0	1	0	0	0
15	DF	(Northern Ireland) NIR	Bobby Burns (out on loan)	3	0	3	0	0	0	0	0	0	0
18	DF	(France) FRA	Yoan Zouma (out on loan)	7	0	4	0	0	0	2	0	1	0
19	DF	(England) ENG	Scott Wilson	14	0	9	0	1	0	3	0	1	0
22	DF	(England) ENG	Tom Davies	12	1	12	1	0	0	0	0	0	0
24	DF	(South Africa) RSA	Kgosi Nthle	26	0	22	0	1	0	2	0	1	0
27	DF	(England) ENG	Bradley Barry	33	1	33	1	0	0	0	0	0	0
29	DF	(Wales) WAL	Neal Eardley	19	0	19	0	0	0	0	0	0	0
31	DF	(England) ENG	Bobby Thomas	21	1	21	1	0	0	0	0	0	0
32	DF	(England) ENG	Dion Donohue	4	0	4	0	0	0	0	0	0	0
Midfielders
4	MF	(England) ENG	Jason Taylor	37	1	34	0	0	0	3	1	0	0
7	MF	(England) ENG	Callum Gribbin	5	0	1	0	0	0	3	0	1	0
8	MF	(England) ENG	Mike Jones	14	2	13	2	0	0	1	0	0	0
10	MF	(England) ENG	Lewis Hardcastle	13	1	12	1	0	0	1	0	0	0
11	MF	(England) ENG	Josh Kay	33	6	29	6	1	0	2	0	1	0
16	MF	(Australia) AUS	Tom Beadling	31	2	29	2	1	0	1	0	0	0
25	MF	(England) ENG	Harrison Biggins (loan expired)	26	2	22	2	1	0	3	0	0	0
25	MF	(England) ENG	Mace Goodridge	2	0	2	0	0	0	0	0	0	0
28	MF	(England) ENG	Chris Taylor	34	1	31	1	0	0	2	0	1	0
30	MF	(Scotland) SCO	Daniel Bramall	3	0	3	0	0	0	0	0	0	0
36	MF	(Republic of Ireland) IRL	Jamie Devitt	17	1	17	1	0	0	0	0	0	0
42	MF	(England) ENG	Ollie Banks	20	0	20	0	0	0	0	0	0	0
Forwards
9	FW	(England) ENG	Scott Quigley	41	15	38	15	0	0	2	0	1	0
17	FW	(England) ENG	Morgan Penfold	1	0	0	0	0	0	1	0	0	0
20	FW	(England) ENG	Dior Angus (released)	25	5	22	4	1	0	1	1	1	0
20	FW	(England) ENG	Mikael Ndjoli	2	0	2	0	0	0	0	0	0	0
22	FW	(England) ENG	Jack Hindle (released)	4	0	2	0	1	0	1	0	0	0
23	FW	(England) ENG	Courtney Baker-Richardson (out on loan)	0	0	0	0	0	0	0	0	0	0
26	FW	(France) FRA	Dimitri Sea	10	0	8	0	0	0	1	0	1	0
29	FW	(England) ENG	Jayden Reid (loan expired)	12	0	10	0	0	0	1	0	1	0
33	FW	(England) ENG	Luke James	47	3	44	3	0	0	2	0	1	0
39	FW	(England) ENG	Calvin Andrew	11	1	11	1	0	0	0	0	0	0

=== Top scorers ===
Includes all competitive matches. The list is sorted by squad number when total goals are equal.

Last updated 10 May 2021.

Rank	Position	Nationality	No.	Player	EFL League Two	EFL Cup	EFL Trophy	FA Cup	Total
1	FW	(England)	9	Scott Quigley	15	0	0	0	15
2	DF	(England)	3	Patrick Brough	6	0	0	0	6
2	MF	(England)	11	Josh Kay	6	0	0	0	6
3	FW	(England)	20	Dior Angus	4	0	1	0	5
4	FW	(England)	33	Luke James	3	0	0	0	3
5	DF	(England)	5	Matthew Platt	2	0	0	0	2
5	MF	(England)	8	Mike Jones	2	0	0	0	2
5	MF	(Australia)	16	Tom Beadling	2	0	0	0	2
5	MF	(England)	25	Harrison Biggins	2	0	0	0	2
6	DF	(England)	2	Connor Brown	1	0	0	0	1
6	MF	(England)	4	Jason Taylor	0	0	1	0	1
6	DF	(England)	6	Sam Hird	1	0	0	0	1
6	MF	(England)	10	Lewis Hardcastle	1	0	0	0	1
6	DF	(Wales)	14	James Jones	1	0	0	0	1
6	DF	(England)	22	Tom Davies	1	0	0	0	1
6	DF	(England)	27	Bradley Barry	1	0	0	0	1
6	MF	(England)	28	Chris Taylor	1	0	0	0	1
6	DF	(England)	31	Bobby Thomas	1	0	0	0	1
6	MF	(Republic of Ireland)	36	Jamie Devitt	1	0	0	0	1
6	FW	(England)	39	Calvin Andrew	1	0	0	0	1
Own goals					1	0	0	0	0
	TOTALS				53	0	2	0	55

=== Cleansheets ===
Includes all competitive matches. The list is sorted by squad number when total cleansheets are equal.

Last updated 10 May 2021.

Rank	Position	Nationality	No.	Player	EFL League Two	EFL Cup	EFL Trophy	FA Cup	Total
1
1	GK	(England)	1	Joel Dixon	9	1	1	0	11
2
2	GK	(England)	12	Josh Lillis	0	0	0	1	1
TOTALS					9	1	1	1	12

=== Disciplinary record ===
Includes all competitive matches.

Last updated 10 May 2021.

Position	Nationality	Number	Name	League Two		EFL Cup		EFL Trophy		FA Cup		Total	
Position	Nationality	Number	Name	Booked	Sent off (straight red)	Booked	Sent off (straight red)	Booked	Sent off (straight red)	Booked	Sent off (straight red)	Booked	Sent off (straight red)
DF	(England)	2	Connor Brown	5	1	1	0	1	0	0	0	7	1
MF	(England)	25	Harrison Biggins	3	1	0	0	0	0	0	0	3	1
DF	(England)	6	Sam Hird	2	1	0	0	0	0	1	0	3	1
MF	(England)	11	Josh Kay	12	0	0	0	0	0	1	0	13	0
MF	(Australia)	16	Tom Beadling	8	0	0	0	0	0	0	0	8	0
DF	(England)	3	Patrick Brough	7	0	0	0	0	0	0	0	7	0
FW	(England)	9	Scott Quigley	6	0	0	0	0	0	0	0	6	0
DF	(England)	27	Bradley Barry	6	0	0	0	0	0	0	0	6	0
DF	(England)	5	Matthew Platt	5	0	0	0	0	0	0	0	5	0
DF	(South Africa)	24	Kgosi Nthle	4	0	0	0	1	0	0	0	5	0
MF	(England)	8	Mike Jones	3	0	1	0	0	0	0	0	4	0
MF	(England)	28	Chris taylor	3	0	0	0	1	0	0	0	4	0
DF	(England)	31	Bobby Thomas	3	0	0	0	0	0	0	0	3	0
MF	(England)	42	Ollie Banks	3	0	0	0	0	0	0	0	3	0
GK	(England)	1	Joel Dixon	2	0	0	0	0	0	0	0	2	0
MF	(England)	7	Callum Gribbin	0	0	0	0	1	0	1	0	2	0
MF	(England)	10	Lewis Hardcastle	2	0	0	0	0	0	0	0	2	0
DF	(Wales)	14	James Jones	2	0	0	0	0	0	0	0	2	0
DF	(France)	18	Yoan Zouma	2	0	0	0	0	0	0	0	2	0
FW	(England)	20	Dior Angus	2	0	0	0	0	0	0	0	2	0
MF	(England)	4	Jason Taylor	1	0	0	0	0	0	0	0	1	0
DF	(England)	19	Scott Wilson	1	0	0	0	0	0	0	0	1	0
DF	(England)	22	Tom Davies	1	0	0	0	0	0	0	0	1	0
DF	(Wales)	29	Neal Eardley	1	0	0	0	0	0	0	0	1	0
DF	(England)	32	Dion Donohue	1	0	0	0	0	0	0	0	1	0
FW	(England)	33	Luke James	1	0	0	0	0	0	0	0	1	0
FW	(England)	39	Calvin Andrew	1	0	0	0	0	0	0	0	1	0
			TOTALS	87	3	2	0	4	0	3	0	96	3
