= Scott Wilson (footballer, born 2000) =

English footballer

Personal information
- Full name: Scott John Wilson
- Date of birth: 10 January 2000 (age 26)
- Position: Central defender

Team information
- Current team: Chorley
- Number: 4

Youth career
- –2018: Burnley

Senior career*
Years	Team	Apps	(Gls)
2018–2020	Burnley	0	(0)
2018	→ Stalybridge Celtic (loan)	16	(1)
2020	→ Blyth Spartans (loan)	6	(0)
2020–2021	Barrow	9	(0)
2021–2022	Curzon Ashton	31	(0)
2022–	Chorley	134	(6)
- * Club domestic league appearances and goals as of 23:22, 4 May 2026 (UTC)

Scott John Wilson (born 10 January 2000) is an English professional footballer who plays as a central defender for National League North side Chorley.

== Career ==
Wilson began his career at Burnley, making 21 appearances in all competitions on loan for Stalybridge Celtic during the first half of the 2018–19 season. He moved on loan to Blyth Spartans in January 2020.

He signed for Barrow in September 2020.

After being released by Barrow at the end of the 2020–21 season, he signed for Curzon Ashton in the National League North in August 2021. He moved to Chorley in July 2022.

== Career statistics ==
As of 4 May 2025

Appearances and goals by club, season and competition
Club	Season	League			FA Cup		League Cup		Other		Total	
Club	Season	Division	Apps	Goals	Apps	Goals	Apps	Goals	Apps	Goals	Apps	Goals
Burnley	2018–19	Premier League	0	0	0	0	0	0	0	0	0	0
Burnley	2019–20	Premier League	0	0	0	0	0	0	0	0	0	0
Burnley	Total		0	0	0	0	0	0	0	0	0	0
Stalybridge Celtic (loan)	2018–19	Northern Premier League	16	1	1	0	—	—	4 (Note: 3 appearances in the FA Trophy and 1 appearance in the Northern Premier League Challenge Cup.)	0	21	1
Blyth Spartans (loan)	2019–20	National League North	6	0	0	0	—	—	0	0	6	0
Barrow	2020–21	League Two	9	0	1	0	1	0	3 (Note: Appearance(s) in the EFL Trophy.)	0	14	0
Curzon Ashton	2021–22	National League North	31	0	2	0	—	—	1 (Note: Appearances in the FA Trophy.)	0	34	0
Chorley	2022–23	National League North	41	2	3	0	—	—	1	0	45	2
Chorley	2023–24	National League North	32	1	3	1	—	—	4	0	39	2
Chorley	2024–25	National League North	37	2	1	0	—	—	2	0	40	2
Career total			172	6	11	1	1	0	15	0	199	7
