= 2019–20 Burnley F.C. season =

English football club season

Burnley
2019–20 season
- Chairman: Mike Garlick
- Manager: Sean Dyche
- Stadium: Turf Moor
- Premier League: 10th
- FA Cup: Fourth round
- EFL Cup: Second round
- Top goalscorer: League: Chris Wood (14); All: Chris Wood (14)
- Highest home attendance: League/All: 21,924 (28 December 2019 v Manchester United, Premier League)
- Lowest home attendance: League: 18,227 (22 February 2020 v Bournemouth); All: 7,445 (28 August 2019 v Sunderland, EFL Cup)
- Average home league attendance: 20,260
Home colours	Away colours	Third colours

The 2019–20 season was Burnley's 138th competitive season, their fourth consecutive in the Premier League and their 57th in top flight English football. Along with the Premier League, the club also competed in the FA Cup and the EFL Cup.

The season covered the period from 1 July 2019 to 26 July 2020.

== Pre-season ==
Pre-season match details
Date	Opponents	Venue	Result	Score F–A	Scorers	Attendance	Ref
12 July 2019	Fulham	N (Note: Match played at Quinta do Lago, Algarve, Portugal)	W	1–0	Wood 70' pen.		
16 July 2019	Accrington Stanley	H (Note: Match played at Barnfield Training Centre, Padiham)	W	8–0	Rodriguez (2), Wood (3), McNeil, Dunne, Pieters		
16 July 2019	Tranmere Rovers	H	L	2–3	Vydra (2)		
20 July 2019	Crewe Alexandra	A	L	0–1			
20 July 2019	Port Vale	A	W	3–1	Brady 53', 84', Vydra 81'	1,272	
23 July 2019	Fleetwood Town	A	W	2–0	Koiki 44', Wood 58'		
27 July 2019	Wigan Athletic	A	D	2–2	Rodriguez 5', McNeil 11'		
30 July 2019	Nice	H	W	6–1	Wood 3', 8', 63', Hendrick 18', Guðmundsson 34', Rodriguez 81'	4,247	
3 August 2019	Parma	H	W	2–0	Rodriguez 52', 56'	4,846	

== Competitions ==
=== Premier League ===
One-off fourth kit was used vs West Ham (8 July).

==== League table ====
Pos	Team	Pld	W	D	L	GF	GA	GD	Pts	Qualification or relegation
8	Arsenal	38	14	14	10	56	48	+8	56	Qualification for the Europa League group stage (Note: Arsenal qualified for the Europa League group stage as the 2019–20 FA Cup winners.)
9	Sheffield United	38	14	12	12	39	39	0	54	
10	Burnley	38	15	9	14	43	50	−7	54	
11	Southampton	38	15	7	16	51	60	−9	52	
12	Everton	38	13	10	15	44	56	−12	49	

Source: Premier League
Rules for classification: 1) Points; 2) Goal difference; 3) Goals scored; 4) If the champions, relegated teams or qualified teams for UEFA competitions cannot be determined by rules 1 to 3, rules 4.1 to 4.3 are applied – 4.1) Points gained in head to head record between such teams; 4.2) Away goals scored in head to head record between such teams; 4.3) Play-offs

==== Results summary ====
Overall								Home						Away					
Pld	W	D	L	GF	GA	GD	Pts	W	D	L	GF	GA	GD	W	D	L	GF	GA	GD
38	15	9	14	43	50	−7	54	8	4	7	24	23	+1	7	5	7	19	27	−8

Last updated: 26 July 2020.
Source: Premier League

==== Results by matchday ====
Matchday	1	2	3	4	5	6	7	8	9	10	11	12	13	14	15	16	17	18	19	20	21	22	23	24	25	26	27	28	29	30	31	32	33	34	35	36	37	38
Ground	H	A	A	H	A	H	A	H	A	H	A	H	A	H	H	A	H	A	A	H	H	A	H	A	H	A	H	A	H	A	H	A	H	A	A	H	A	H
Result	W	L	D	L	D	W	D	W	L	L	L	W	W	L	L	L	W	W	L	L	L	L	W	W	D	W	W	D	D	L	W	W	D	W	D	D	W	L
Position	5	10	6	12	13	7	10	5	8	11	14	9	6	8	11	13	12	10	12	13	15	15	14	13	11	11	10	9	10	11	11	10	10	10	10	10	9	10

Updated to match(es) played on 26 July 2020. Source: Worldfootball
A = Away; H = Home; W = Win; D = Draw; L = Loss

==== Matches ====
Premier League match details
Date	League position	Opponents	Venue	Result	Score F–A	Scorers	Attendance	Ref
10 August 2019	4th	Southampton	H	W	3–0	Barnes 63', 70', Guðmundsson 75'	19,784	
17 August 2019	10th	Arsenal	A	L	1–2	Barnes 43'	60,214	
25 August 2019	6th	Wolverhampton Wanderers	A	D	1–1	Barnes 13'	30,522	
31 August 2019	12th	Liverpool	H	L	0–3		21,762	
14 September 2019	14th	Brighton & Hove Albion	A	D	1–1	Hendrick 90+1'	29,398	
21 September 2019	12th	Norwich City	H	W	2–0	Wood 10', 14'	19,712	
28 September 2019	11th	Aston Villa	A	D	2–2	Rodriguez 68', Wood 81'	41,546	
5 October 2019	7th	Everton	H	W	1–0	Hendrick 72'	20,650	
19 October 2019	8th	Leicester City	A	L	1–2	Wood 26'	32,105	
26 October 2019	13th	Chelsea	H	L	2–4	Rodriguez 86', McNeil 89'	20,975	
2 November 2019	14th	Sheffield United	A	L	0–3		31,131	
9 November 2019	9th	West Ham United	H	W	3–0	Barnes 11', Wood 44', Roberto 54' (o.g.)	20,255	
23 November 2019	6th	Watford	A	W	3–0	Wood 53', Barnes 82' (pen.), Tarkowski 88'	19,711	
30 November 2019	8th	Crystal Palace	H	L	0–2		19,818	
3 December 2019	8th	Manchester City	H	L	1–4	Brady 89'	20,101	
7 December 2019	13th	Tottenham Hotspur	A	L	0–5		58,401	
14 December 2019	12th	Newcastle United	H	W	1–0	Wood 58'	19,798	
21 December 2019	10th	Bournemouth	A	W	1–0	Rodriguez 89'	10,020	
26 December 2019	12th	Everton	A	L	0–1		39,177	
28 December 2019	13th	Manchester United	H	L	0–2		21,924	
1 January 2020	15th	Aston Villa	H	L	1–2	Wood 80'	19,561	
11 January 2020	15th	Chelsea	A	L	0–3		40,396	
19 January 2020	14th	Leicester City	H	W	2–1	Wood 56', Westwood 79'	19,788	
22 January 2020	13th	Manchester United	A	W	2–0	Wood 39', Rodriguez 56'	73,198	
2 February 2020	11th	Arsenal	H	D	0–0		21,048	
15 February 2020	10th	Southampton	A	W	2–1	Westwood 2', Vydra 60'	26,302	
22 February 2020	8th	Bournemouth	H	W	3–0	Vydra 53', Rodriguez 61' pen., McNeil 87'	18,227	
29 February 2020	9th	Newcastle United	A	D	0–0		52,219	
7 March 2020	10th	Tottenham Hotspur	H	D	1–1	Wood 13'	20,496	
22 June 2020 (Note: The match was postponed on 13 March due to concerns over the coronavirus pandemic, It was rescheduled to 22 June.)	11th	Manchester City	A	L	0–5		0	
25 June 2020 (Note: The match was postponed on 13 March due to concerns over the coronavirus pandemic, and rescheduled to 25 June.)	11th	Watford	H	W	1–0	Rodriguez 73'	0	
29 June 2020 (Note: The match was postponed on 19 March due to concerns over the coronavirus pandemic, and rescheduled to 29 June.)	8th	Crystal Palace	A	W	1–0	Mee 62'	0	
5 July 2020 (Note: The match was postponed on 19 March due to concerns over the coronavirus pandemic, and rescheduled to 5 July.)	9th	Sheffield United	H	D	1–1	Tarkowski 43'	0	
8 July 2020 (Note: The match was postponed on 3 April due to concerns over the coronavirus pandemic, and rescheduled to 8 July.)	9th	West Ham United	A	W	1–0	Rodriguez 38'	0	
11 July 2020 (Note: The match was postponed on 3 April due to concerns over the coronavirus pandemic, and rescheduled to 11 July.)	9th	Liverpool	A	D	1–1	Rodriguez 69'	0	
15 July 2020 (Note: The match was postponed on 3 April due to concerns over the coronavirus pandemic, and rescheduled to 15 July.)	10th	Wolverhampton Wanderers	H	D	1–1	Wood 90+6' pen.	0	
18 July 2020 (Note: The match was postponed on 3 April due to concerns over the coronavirus pandemic, and rescheduled to 18 July.)	9th	Norwich City	A	W	2–0	Wood 45+5', Godfrey 80' o.g.	0	
26 July 2020 (Note: The match was postponed on 3 April due to concerns over the coronavirus pandemic, and rescheduled to 26 July.)	10th	Brighton & Hove Albion	H	L	1–2	Wood 44'	0	

=== FA Cup ===
FA Cup match details
Round	Date	Opponents	Venue	Result	Score F–A	Scorers	Attendance	Ref
Third round	4 January 2020	Peterborough United	H	W	4–2	Rodriguez 8', 52', Pieters 15', Hendrick 23'	8,043	
Fourth round	25 January 2020	Norwich City	H	L	1–2	Pieters 72'	8,071	

=== EFL Cup ===
The second round draw was made on 13 August 2019 following the conclusion of all but one first round matches.

EFL Cup match details
Round	Date	Opponents	Venue	Result	Score F–A	Scorers	Attendance	Ref
Second round	28 August 2019	Sunderland	H	L	1–3	Rodriguez 11'	7,445	

== Transfers ==
=== Transfers in ===
Date	Position	Nationality	Name	From	Fee	Team	Ref.
1 July 2019	RB	(England)	Joel Senior	(England) Curzon Ashton	Undisclosed	Under-23s	
8 July 2019	LB	(Netherlands)	Erik Pieters	(England) Stoke City	Undisclosed	First team	
9 July 2019	ST	(England)	Jay Rodriguez	(England) West Bromwich Albion	Undisclosed	First team	
15 July 2019	RB	(England)	Ryan Cooney	(England) Bury	Free transfer	Under-23s	
2 August 2019	GK	(Northern Ireland)	Bailey Peacock-Farrell	(England) Leeds United	Undisclosed	First team	
2 August 2019	DM	(England)	Adam Phillips	Free agent	Free transfer	Under-23s	
16 September 2019	GK	(Denmark)	Lukas Jensen	(Denmark) Hellerup	Undisclosed	Under-23s	
8 October 2019	CF	(Sweden)	Joel Mumbongo	(Italy) Hellas Verona	Undisclosed	Under-23s	
28 January 2020	CF	(England)	Henri Ogunby	(England) Manchester City	Undisclosed	Under-23s	
30 January 2020	CM	(England)	Josh Brownhill	(England) Bristol City	Undisclosed	First team	

=== Loans in ===
Date from	Position	Nationality	Name	From	Date until	Team	Ref.
8 August 2019	CM	(England)	Danny Drinkwater	(England) Chelsea	6 January 2020	First team	

=== Loans out ===
Date from	Position	Nationality	Name	To	Date until	Team	Ref.
1 July 2019	CM	(Australia)	Aiden O'Neill	(Australia) Brisbane Roar	30 June 2020	First team	
8 August 2019	CF	(Bermuda)	Nahki Wells	(England) Queens Park Rangers	30 June 2020	First team	
23 August 2019	CB	(England)	Teddy Perkins	(England) Ramsbottom United	1 January 2020	Under-23s	
2 September 2019	CB	(Republic of Ireland)	Jimmy Dunne	(England) Fleetwood Town	1 January 2020	Under-23s	
11 October 2019	GK	(England)	Harry Allen	(England) Curzon Ashton	November 2019	Under-23s	
30 November 2019	LB	(England)	Finlay Armstrong	(England) Clitheroe	January 2020	Academy	
1 January 2020	MF	(England)	Olatunde Bayode	(England) Curzon Ashton	30 June 2020	Under-23s	
1 January 2020	ST	(England)	Will Harris	(England) Warrington Town	30 June 2020	Under-23s	
2 January 2020	RB	(England)	Ryan Cooney	(England) Morecambe	30 June 2020	Under-23s	
2 January 2020	MF	(England)	Christian N'Guessan	(England) Oldham Athletic	30 June 2020	Under-23s	
2 January 2020	DM	(England)	Adam Phillips	(England) Morecambe	30 June 2020	Under-23s	
3 January 2020	DF	(England)	Scott Wilson	(England) Blyth Spartans	30 June 2020	Academy	
7 January 2020	LB	(England)	Anthony Glennon	(England) Grimsby Town	30 June 2020	Academy	
10 January 2020	RB	(England)	Jordan Cropper	(England) Chesterfield	30 June 2020	Academy	
16 January 2020	CM	(England)	Josh Benson	(England) Grimsby Town	30 June 2020	Under-23s	
30 January 2020	CF	(England)	Robert Harker	(England) Hartlepool United	30 June 2020	Under-23s	
13 February 2020	CB	(England)	Ollie Younger	(Republic of Ireland) St Patrick's Athletic	31 July 2020	Under-23s	

=== Transfers out ===
Date	Position	Nationality	Name	To	Fee	Team	Ref.
1 July 2019	CM	(England)	Marley Blair	Free agent	Released	Under-23s	
1 July 2019	GK	(England)	Adam Bruce	Free agent	Released	Academy	
1 July 2019	RW	(England)	Tinashe Chakwana	Free agent	Released	Under-23s	
1 July 2019	CB	(Republic of Ireland)	James Clarke	(England) Mansfield Town	Released	Under-23s	
1 July 2019	CF	(England)	Peter Crouch	Retired		First team	
1 July 2019	CB	(England)	Ed Cook	(England) Hampton & Richmond Borough	Released	Under-23s	
1 July 2019	CM	(England)	Mark Howarth	Free agent	Released	Under-23s	
1 July 2019	GK	(Denmark)	Anders Lindegaard	(Sweden) Helsingborg	Released	First team	
1 July 2019	CF	(England)	Ntumba Massanka	(England) Chorley	Released	Under-23s	
1 July 2019	GK	(Northern Ireland)	Conor Mitchell	(Northern Ireland) Larne	Released	Under-23s	
1 July 2019	GK	(England)	Aidan Stone	(England) Mansfield Town	Released	Under-23s	
1 July 2019	CB	(England)	Richard Taylor	(England) Southend United	Free transfer	Academy	
1 July 2019	RW	(Republic of Ireland)	Jonathan Walters	Retired		First team	
1 July 2019	LB	(Republic of Ireland)	Stephen Ward	(England) Stoke City	Released	First team	
1 August 2019	GK	(England)	Tom Heaton	(England) Aston Villa	Undisclosed	First team	
10 August 2019	CF	(England)	Dan Agyei	(England) Oxford United	Compensation	Under-23s	
3 September 2019	CM	(Belgium)	Steven Defour	(Belgium) Royal Antwerp	Contract cancelled	First team	
30 January 2020	CF	(Bermuda)	Nahki Wells	(England) Bristol City	Undisclosed	First team	

== Appearances and goals ==
Numbers in parentheses denote appearances as substitute.
Players with names struck through and marked † left the club during the playing season.
Players with names in italics and marked * were on loan from another club for the whole of their season with Burnley.
Players listed with no appearances have been in the matchday squad but only as unused substitutes.
Key to positions: GK – Goalkeeper; DF – Defender; MF – Midfielder; FW – Forward

Players contracted for the 2019–20 season
No.	Pos.	Nat.	Name	League		FA Cup		EFL Cup		Total		Discipline	
No.	Pos.	Nat.	Name	Apps	Goals	Apps	Goals	Apps	Goals	Apps	Goals	A yellow rectangle, denoting the yellow penalty card shown to a player being cautioned	A red rectangle, denoting the red penalty card shown to a player being sent off
1	GK	ENG	Nick Pope	38	0	0	0	0	0	38	0	1	0
2	DF	ENG	Matthew Lowton	17	0	2	0	0 (1)	0	19 (1)	0	2	0
3	DF	ENG	Charlie Taylor	22 (2)	0	0 (1)	0	1	0	23 (3)	0	3	0
4	MF	ENG	Jack Cork	30	0	2	0	0	0	32	0	1	0
5	DF	ENG	James Tarkowski	38	2	2	0	0	0	40	2	10	0
6	DF	ENG	Ben Mee	32	1	0	0	0	0	32	0	7	0
7	MF	ISL	Jóhann Berg Guðmundsson	6 (6)	1	1	0	0	0	7 (6)	1	0	0
8	MF	ENG	~~Danny Drinkwater *~~ †	1	0	0	0	1	0	2	0	0	0
8	MF	ENG	Josh Brownhill	9 (1)	0	0	0	0	0	9 (1)	0	2	0
9	FW	NZL	Chris Wood	29 (3)	14	2	0	0 (1)	0	31 (4)	14	1	0
10	FW	ENG	Ashley Barnes	17 (2)	6	0	0	0	0	17 (2)	6	4	0
11	MF	ENG	Dwight McNeil	38	2	0 (1)	0	1	0	39 (1)	2	5	0
12	MF	IRL	Robbie Brady	5 (12)	1	1	0	0	0	6 (12)	1	1	0
13	MF	IRL	~~Jeff Hendrick~~ †	22 (2)	2	1 (1)	1	1	0	24 (3)	3	8	0
14	DF	ENG	Ben Gibson	0	0	0	0	1	0	1	0	0	0
15	GK	NIR	Bailey Peacock-Farrell	0	0	0	0	0	0	0	0	0	0
16	MF	BEL	~~Steven Defour~~ †	0	0	0	0	0	0	0	0	0	0
18	MF	ENG	Ashley Westwood	35	2	1 (1)	0	0	0	36 (1)	2	9	0
19	FW	ENG	Jay Rodriguez	20 (16)	8	2	2	1	1	23 (16)	11	1	0
20	GK	ENG	~~Joe Hart~~ †	0	0	2	0	1	0	3	0	0	0
23	DF	NED	Erik Pieters	21 (3)	0	2	2	0	0	23 (3)	2	2	0
25	MF	ENG	~~Aaron Lennon~~ †	4 (12)	0	2	0	1	0	7 (12)	0	4	0
26	DF	SCO	Phil Bardsley	21	0	0	0	1	0	22	0	6	0
27	FW	CZE	Matěj Vydra	7 (12)	2	0 (2)	0	1	0	8 (14)	2	0	0
28	DF	IRL	Kevin Long	6 (2)	0	2	0	1	0	9 (2)	0	1	0
30	GK	ENG	~~Adam Legzdins~~ †	0	0	0	0	0	0	0	0	0	0
33	FW	ENG	Max Thompson	0 (1)	0	0	0	0	0	0 (1)	0	0	0
34	DF	IRL	Jimmy Dunne	0	0	0	0	0	0	0	0	0	0
37	DF	ENG	Bobby Thomas	0	0	0	0	0	0	0	0	0	0
38	FW	ENG	Lewis Richardson	0	0	0	0	0	0	0	0	0	0
40	GK	DEN	Lukas Jensen	0	0	0	0	0	0	0	0	0	0
41	MF	ENG	Josh Benson	0	0	0	0	0	0	0	0	0	0
42	DF	ENG	Ali Koiki	0	0	0	0	0	0	0	0	0	0
44	MF	ENG	Mace Goodridge	0	0	0	0	0	0	0	0	0	0
45	DF	ENG	Anthony Glennon	0	0	0	0	0	0	0	0	0	0
47	FW	SWE	Joel Mumbongo	0	0	0	0	0	0	0	0	0	0
