= 2018–19 Burnley F.C. season =

English football club season

Burnley
2018–19 season
- Chairman: Mike Garlick
- Manager: Sean Dyche
- Stadium: Turf Moor
- Premier League: 15th
- FA Cup: Fourth round
- EFL Cup: Third round
- UEFA Europa League: Play-off round
- Top goalscorer: League: Ashley Barnes (12); All: Ashley Barnes; Chris Wood (13 each)
- Highest home attendance: 21,741 (v Liverpool, Premier League, 5 December 2018)
- Lowest home attendance: 11,053 (v Barnsley, FA Cup, 5 January 2019)
- Average home league attendance: 20,534
Home colours	Away colours	Third colours

The 2018–19 season was Burnley's 137th competitive season, their third consecutive in the Premier League and their 56th in top flight English football. Along with the Premier League, the club competed in the FA Cup, EFL Cup and UEFA Europa League. This was the club's first qualification to a European competition in 51 years.

The season covered the period from 1 July 2018 to 30 June 2019.

== Match details ==
=== Premier League ===
==== League table ====
Pos	Team	Pld	W	D	L	GF	GA	GD	Pts
13	Newcastle United	38	12	9	17	42	48	−6	45
14	Bournemouth	38	13	6	19	56	70	−14	45
15	Burnley	38	11	7	20	45	68	−23	40
16	Southampton	38	9	12	17	45	65	−20	39
17	Brighton & Hove Albion	38	9	9	20	35	60	−25	36

Source: Premier League
Rules for classification: 1) Points; 2) Goal difference; 3) Goals scored; 4) Play-offs (only if needed to decide champion, teams for relegation or teams for UEFA competitions).

==== Results summary ====
Overall								Home						Away					
Pld	W	D	L	GF	GA	GD	Pts	W	D	L	GF	GA	GD	W	D	L	GF	GA	GD
38	11	7	20	45	68	−23	40	7	2	10	24	32	−8	4	5	10	21	36	−15

Last updated: 12 May 2019.
Source: Premier League

==== Matches ====
Premier League match details
Date	League position	Opponents	Venue	Result	Score F–A	Scorers	Attendance	Ref
12 August 2018	11th	Southampton	A	D	0–0		30,784	
19 August 2018	15th	Watford	H	L	1–3	Tarkowski 6'	18,822	
26 August 2018	18th	Fulham	A	L	2–4	Hendrick 10', Tarkowski 41'	23,438	
2 September 2018	19th	Manchester United	H	L	0–2		21,525	
16 September 2018	20th	Wolverhampton Wanderers	A	L	0–1		30,406	
22 September 2018	16th	AFC Bournemouth	H	W	4–0	Vydra 39', Lennon 41', Barnes 83', 88'	18,636	
30 September 2018	12th	Cardiff City	A	W	2–1	Guðmundsson 51', Vokes 70'	30,411	
6 October 2018	12th	Huddersfield Town	H	D	1–1	Vokes 20'	20,533	
20 October 2018	13th	Manchester City	A	L	0–5		54,094	
28 October 2018	15th	Chelsea	H	L	0–4		21,430	
3 November 2018	15th	West Ham United	A	L	2–4	Guðmundsson 45', Wood 77'	56,862	
10 November 2018	15th	Leicester City	A	D	0–0		32,184	
26 November 2018	17th	Newcastle United	H	L	1–2	Vokes 40'	20,628	
1 December 2018	19th	Crystal Palace	A	L	0–2		25,098	
5 December 2018	19th	Liverpool	H	L	1–3	Cork 54'	21,741	
8 December 2018	17th	Brighton & Hove Albion	H	W	1–0	Tarkowski 40'	18,497	
15 December 2018	17th	Tottenham Hotspur	A	L	0–1		41,645	
22 December 2018	18th	Arsenal	A	L	1–3	Barnes 63'	59,493	
26 December 2018	18th	Everton	H	L	1–5	Gibson 36'	21,484	
30 December 2018	18th	West Ham United	H	W	2–0	Wood 15', McNeil 34'	20,933	
2 January 2019	16th	Huddersfield Town	A	W	2–1	Wood 40', Barnes 74'	23,715	
12 January 2019	15th	Fulham	H	W	2–1	Hendrick 20', Odoi 23' (o.g.)	19,316	
19 January 2019	16th	Watford	A	D	0–0		19,510	
29 January 2019	15th	Manchester United	A	D	2–2	Barnes 51', Wood 81'	74,529	
2 February 2019	17th	Southampton	H	D	1–1	Barnes 90+4' (pen.)	19,787	
9 February 2019	15th	Brighton & Hove Albion	A	W	3–1	Wood (2) 26', 61', Barnes 74' (pen.)	29,323	
23 February 2019	13th	Tottenham Hotspur	H	W	2–1	Wood 57', Barnes 83'	21,338	
26 February 2019	15th	Newcastle United	A	L	0–2		48,323	
2 March 2019	16th	Crystal Palace	H	L	1–3	Barnes 90'	19,223	
10 March 2019	17th	Liverpool	A	L	2–4	Westwood 6', Guðmundsson 90+1'	53,310	
16 March 2019	17th	Leicester City	H	L	1–2	McNeil 38'	20,719	
30 March 2019	17th	Wolverhampton Wanderers	H	W	2–0	Coady 2' (o.g.), McNeil 77'	20,990	
6 April 2019	14th	AFC Bournemouth	A	W	3–1	Wood 18', Westwood 30', Barnes 56'	10,446	
13 April 2019	14th	Cardiff City	H	W	2–0	Wood (2) 31', 90+2'	21,480	
22 April 2019	15th	Chelsea	A	D	2–2	Hendrick 8', Barnes 24'	40,642	
28 April 2019	15th	Manchester City	H	L	0–1		21,605	
3 May 2019	15th	Everton	A	L	0–2		39,303	
12 May 2019	15th	Arsenal	H	L	1–3	Barnes 65'	21,461	

=== FA Cup ===
The third round draw was made live on BBC by Ruud Gullit and Paul Ince from Stamford Bridge on 3 December 2018. The fourth round draw was made live on BBC by Robbie Keane and Carl Ikeme from Wolverhampton on 7 January 2019.

FA Cup match details
Round	Date	Opponents	Venue	Result	Score F–A	Scorers	Attendance	Ref
Third round	5 January 2019	Barnsley	H	W	1–0	Wood 90+2' (pen.)	11,053	
Fourth round	26 January 2019	Manchester City	A	L	0–5		50,121	

=== EFL Cup ===
EFL Cup match details
Round	Date	Opponents	Venue	Result	Score F–A	Scorers	Attendance	Ref
Third round	25 September 2018	Burton Albion	A	L	1–2	Long 40'	2,449	

=== UEFA Europa League ===
==== Qualifying stage ====
UEFA Europa League qualifying phase and play-off round match details
Round	Date	Opponents	Venue	Result	Score F–A	Scorers	Attendance	Ref
Second qualifying round first leg	26 July 2018	Aberdeen	A	D	1–1	Vokes 80'	20,313	
Second qualifying round second leg	2 August 2018	Aberdeen	H	W	3–1 (a.e.t.), 4–2 agg.	Wood 6', Cork 101', Barnes 114' (pen.)	17,404	
Third qualifying round first leg	9 August 2018	İstanbul Başakşehir	A	D	0–0		4,503	
Third qualifying round second leg	16 August 2018	İstanbul Başakşehir	H	W	1–0 (a.e.t.), 1–0 agg.	Cork 98'	16,583	
Play-off round first leg	23 August 2018	Olympiacos	A	L	1–3	Wood 33' (pen.)	25,010	
Play-off round second leg	30 August 2018	Olympiacos	H	D	1–1, 2–4 agg.	Vydra 86'	15,234	

== Transfers ==
=== In ===
Date	Player	Club†	Fee	Ref
3 July 2018	Josh Benson	Arsenal	Free	
3 July 2018	Ed Cook		Free	
3 July 2018	Anthony Glennon	Liverpool	Free	
3 July 2018	Robert Harker	Bury	Free	
3 July 2018	Teddy Perkins	Leyton Orient	Free	
4 July 2018	Mace Goodridge	Newcastle United	Free	
31 July 2018	Vinnie Steels	York City	Free	
5 August 2018	Ben Gibson	Middlesbrough	Undisclosed	
7 August 2018	Joe Hart	Manchester City	Undisclosed	
8 August 2018	Matěj Vydra	Derby County	Undisclosed	
15 August 2018	George McMahon	Rotherham United	Free	
31 January 2019	Peter Crouch	Stoke City	Part exchange	

† Brackets around club names denote the player's contract with that club had expired before he joined Burnley.

=== Out ===
Date	Player	Club†	Fee	Ref
1 July 2018	Tom Anderson	Doncaster Rovers	Free	
1 July 2018	Scott Arfield	Rangers	Free	
1 July 2018	Arlen Birch	Free agent	Released	
1 July 2018	Josh Ginnelly	Walsall	Free	
1 July 2018	Bradley Jackson	Free agent	Released	
1 July 2018	Harry Limb	King's Lynn Town	Released	
1 July 2018	Chris Long	Fleetwood Town	Released	
1 July 2018	Dean Marney	Fleetwood Town	Released	
1 July 2018	Khius Metz	Free agent	Released	
1 July 2018	Rahis Nabi	Alvechurch	Released	
1 July 2018	Jamie Thomas	Free agent	Released	
5 July 2018	Jordan Barnett	Barnsley	Free	
31 August 2018	Connor King	Chester	Free	
31 January 2019	Sam Vokes	Stoke City	Undisclosed	
20 March 2019	Michael Fowler	Fleetwood Town	Undisclosed	

=== Loans out ===
Date	Player	Club	Return	Ref
26 July 2018	Conor Mitchell	St Johnstone	30 January 2019	
27 July 2018	Aidan Stone	Lancaster City	January 2018	
15 August 2018	Aiden O'Neill	Central Coast Mariners	End of season	
21 August 2018	Jimmy Dunne	Hearts	7 January 2019	
23 August 2018	Nahki Wells	Queens Park Rangers	End of season	
30 August 2018	Ntumba Massanka	Dover Athletic	January 2019	
30 August 2018	Jonathan Walters	Ipswich Town	January 2019	
6 September 2018	Michael Fowler	Padiham	Work experience	
19 November 2018	Bobby Thomas	Kendal Town	22 December 2018	
19 November 2018	Kian Yari	Kendal Town	22 December 2018	
9 January 2019	Jimmy Dunne	Sunderland	End of season	
9 January 2019	Ntumba Massanka	R.W.D. Molenbeek	End of season	
10 January 2019	Ali Koiki	Swindon Town	End of season	
18 January 2019	George McMahon	Ashton United	End of season	
30 January 2019	Conor Mitchell	Linfield	End of season	

== Appearances and goals ==
Numbers in parentheses denote appearances as substitute.
Players with names struck through and marked † left the club during the playing season.
Players with names in italics and marked * were on loan from another club for the whole of their season with Burnley.
Players listed with no appearances have been in the matchday squad but only as unused substitutes.
Key to positions: GK – Goalkeeper; DF – Defender; MF – Midfielder; FW – Forward

Players contracted for the 2018–19 season
No.	Pos.	Nat.	Name	League		FA Cup		EFL Cup		UEL		Total		Discipline	
No.	Pos.	Nat.	Name	Apps	Goals	Apps	Goals	Apps	Goals	Apps	Goals	Apps	Goals	A yellow rectangle, denoting the yellow penalty card shown to a player being cautioned	A red rectangle, denoting the red penalty card shown to a player being sent off
1	GK	ENG	Tom Heaton	19	0	0	0	1	0	2	0	22	0	3	0
2	DF	ENG	Matthew Lowton	19 (2)	0	0	0	1	0	2	0	22 (2)	0	9	0
3	DF	ENG	Charlie Taylor	35 (3)	0	2	0	0	0	4 (1)	0	41 (4)	0	3	0
4	MF	ENG	Jack Cork	37	1	0 (2)	0	0	0	4 (2)	2	41 (4)	3	6	0
5	DF	ENG	James Tarkowski	35	3	2	0	0	0	3 (2)	0	40 (2)	3	9	0
6	DF	ENG	Ben Mee	38	0	0	0	1	0	4	0	43	0	10	0
7	MF	ISL	Jóhann Berg Guðmundsson	19 (10)	3	0 (1)	0	1	0	4 (1)	0	24 (12)	3	4	0
9	FW	WAL	~~Sam Vokes~~ †	10 (10)	3	1	0	0 (1)	0	3 (3)	1	14 (14)	4	0	0
10	FW	ENG	Ashley Barnes	26 (11)	12	0	0	0 (1)	0	4 (1)	1	30 (13)	13	10	0
11	FW	NZL	Chris Wood	29 (9)	10	0 (2)	1	1	0	3 (2)	2	33 (13)	13	2	0
12	MF	IRL	Robbie Brady	6 (10)	0	1	0	0	0	0	0	7 (10)	0	3	1
13	MF	IRL	Jeff Hendrick	25 (7)	3	2	0	0 (1)	0	5 (1)	0	32 (9)	3	4	0
14	DF	ENG	Ben Gibson	1	1	2	0	0	0	2	0	5	1	3	1
15	FW	ENG	Peter Crouch	0 (6)	0	0	0	0	0	0	0	0 (6)	0	1	0
16	MF	BEL	Steven Defour	6	0	2	0	1	0	0	0	9	0	1	0
18	MF	ENG	Ashley Westwood	31 (3)	2	0 (1)	0	1	0	5	0	37 (4)	2	6	0
19	FW	IRL	Jonathan Walters	0	0	0	0	0	0	1	0	1	0	0	0
20	GK	ENG	Joe Hart	19	0	0	0	0	0	2	0	21	0	1	0
21	FW	BER	Nahki Wells	0	0	0	0	0	0	0	0	0	0	0	0
22	GK	DEN	Anders Lindegaard	0	0	0	0	0	0	1 (1)	0	1 (1)	0	0	0
23	DF	IRL	Stephen Ward	3	0	2	0	1	0	4	0	10	0	2	0
25	MF	ENG	Aaron Lennon	14 (2)	1	0	0	0	0	4 (2)	0	18 (4)	1	2	0
26	DF	SCO	Phil Bardsley	19	0	0	0	0	0	4	0	23	0	10	0
27	FW	CZE	Matěj Vydra	3 (10)	1	2	0	1	0	0 (1)	1	6 (11)	2	1	0
28	DF	IRL	Kevin Long	5 (1)	0	2	0	1	1	3	0	11 (1)	1	4	0
29	GK	ENG	Nick Pope	0	0	2	0	0	0	1	0	3	0	0	0
30	GK	ENG	Adam Legzdins	0	0	0	0	0	0	0	0	0	0	0	0
31	MF	ENG	Dwight McNeil	19 (2)	3	2	0	1	0	1 (1)	0	23 (3)	3	2	0
32	FW	ENG	Dan Agyei	0	0	0	0	0	0	0	0	0	0	0	0
36	GK	NIR	Conor Mitchell	0	0	0	0	0	0	0	0	0	0	0	0
42	DF	ENG	Ali Koiki	0	0	0	0	0	0	0	0	0	0	0	0
45	DF	ENG	Anthony Glennon	0	0	0	0	0	0	0	0	0	0	0	0
46	MF	ENG	Josh Benson	0	0	0	0	0	0	0	0	0	0	0	0
