= Dan Bramall =

Dan Bramall is the name of:

- Dan Bramall (athlete) (born 1985), British T33 athlete
- Dan Bramall (footballer) (born 1998), English footballer
