= Robert Harker =

English footballer

Personal information
- Full name: Robert William Harker
- Date of birth: 6 March 2000 (age 26)
- Place of birth: Gargrave, England
- Height: 1.88 m (6 ft 2 in)
- Position: Forward

Team information
- Current team: Hume City FC
- Number: 17

Youth career
- 2015–2016: Bury

Senior career*
Years	Team	Apps	(Gls)
2016–2018	Bury	0	(0)
2018–2022	Burnley	0	(0)
2020	→ Hartlepool United (loan)	7	(0)
2022–2024	FC Halifax Town	64	(17)
- * Club domestic league appearances and goals as of 22:00, 29 April 2022 Years3 2022-2024 (UTC) Clubs5 = Hume City FC Caps5=0 Goals5=0 Club-update = 16:30, 14 June 2025

Robert William Harker (born 6 March 2000) is an English professional footballer who plays as a forward.

== Early life ==
Robert William Harker was born 6 March 2000 in the village of Gargrave, North Yorkshire. He attended Aireville School in Skipton until the age of 16. Beginning his footballing career with local side Grassington Juniors, Harker was offered a scholarship with Bury in 2015.

== Club career ==
On 4 October 2016, Harker made his Bury debut in an EFL Trophy tie against Bradford City, replacing Hallam Hope with one minute remaining. The fixture resulted in a 2–1 defeat. He signed on loan for Hartlepool United on 30 January 2020.

In July 2022, he signed for National League side FC Halifax Town on a free transfer.

== Career statistics ==
As of match played 24 April 2024

Appearances and goals by club, season and competition
Club	Season	League			FA Cup		League Cup		Other		Total	
Club	Season	Division	Apps	Goals	Apps	Goals	Apps	Goals	Apps	Goals	Apps	Goals
Bury	2015–16	League One	0	0	0	0	0	0	0	0	0	0
Bury	2016–17	League One	0	0	0	0	0	0	1 (Note: Appearance(s) in EFL Trophy)	0	1	0
Bury	2017–18	League One	0	0	0	0	0	0	1	0	1	0
Bury	Total		0	0	0	0	0	0	2	0	2	0
Burnley	2018–19	Premier League	0	0	0	0	0	0	0	0	0	0
Burnley	2019–20	Premier League	0	0	0	0	0	0	—		0	0
Burnley	2021–22	Premier League	0	0	0	0	0	0	—		0	0
Burnley	Total		0	0	0	0	0	0	—		0	0
Hartlepool United (loan)	2019–20	National League	7	0	—		—		—		7	0
FC Halifax Town	2022–23	National League	35	8	2	0	0	0	6	2	43	10
FC Halifax Town	2023–24	National League	29	9	0	0	0	0	2	0	31	9
FC Halifax Town	Total		64	17	2	0	0	0	!8	2	74	19
Career total			71	17	2	0	0	0	10	2	83	19

== Honours ==
FC Halifax Town

- FA Trophy: 2022–23
