= Tom Beadling =

Australian professional footballer

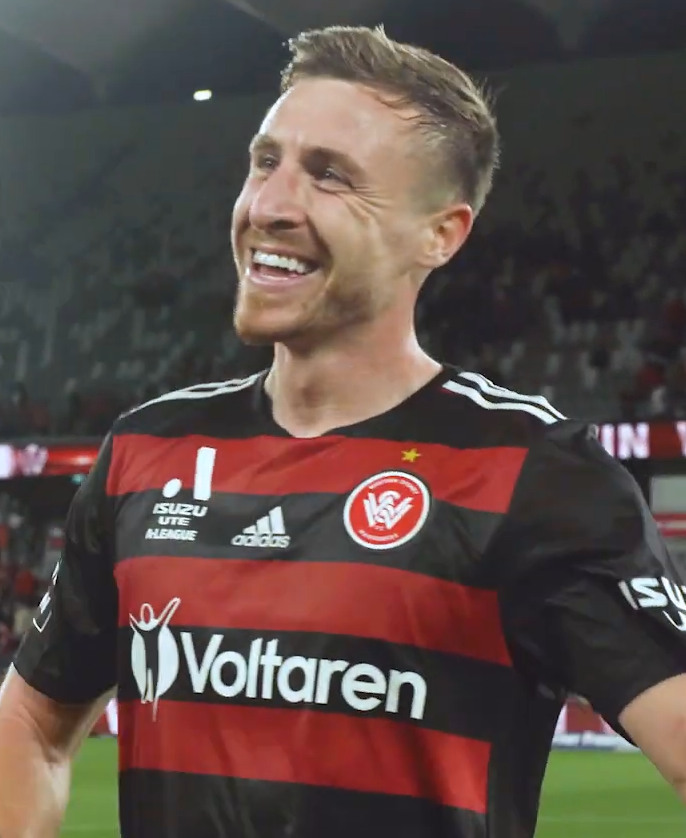
- Beadling with Western Sydney Wanderers in 2023

Personal information
- Full name: Thomas Christopher Beadling
- Date of birth: 16 January 1996 (age 30)
- Place of birth: Barrow-in-Furness, England
- Height: 6 ft 1 in (1.85 m)
- Positions: Defender; midfielder

Team information
- Current team: Arbroath
- Number: 26

Youth career
- 2004–2015: Sunderland

Senior career*
Years	Team	Apps	(Gls)
2015–2018	Sunderland	0	(0)
2017	→ Bury (loan)	2	(0)
2018	→ Dunfermline Athletic (loan)	11	(1)
2018–2020	Dunfermline Athletic	40	(3)
2020–2022	Barrow	41	(2)
2022–2024	Western Sydney Wanderers	27	(0)
2025–	Arbroath	11	(0)
- * Club domestic league appearances and goals as of 4 May 2026

Thomas Christopher Beadling (born 16 January 1996) is a professional footballer who plays as a midfielder for Arbroath. Beadling can also play as a defender.

Born in Barrow, England, Beadling spent several years in Australia before joining Sunderland's Academy. In 2017, he was loaned to Bury, where he made his professional debut, and the following year he spent half a season on loan with Dunfermline Athletic. After a successful spell in Scotland, Beadling joined Dunfermline on a permanent deal.

Beadling has been involved with Australia's youth teams in the past.

== Early life ==
Born in Barrow, England, Beadling was raised in Ashbrooke and attended St Aidan's Catholic Academy. Beadling joined Sunderland as an eight-year old and remained linked with the club throughout his youth. In 2008, he moved to Australia when his father was offered a job in the Royal Australian Navy.

As a teenager Beadling spent time in Western Australia where he played with the National Training Centre. In mid-2009 he represented Australia at the Under-13 Festival of Football tournament in Malaysia. A family move back to England the following year saw Beadling re-enter the Sunderland academy.

== Club career ==
=== Sunderland ===
On 26 April 2013, Beadling made his Sunderland U21 debut, starting the whole game, against Fulham U21, which he scored an own goal, in a 2–2 draw. On 14 November 2014, Beadling signed his first professional contract on a three-year contract. He was called up to the first team and appeared as an unused substitute bench, in a 1–0 win against Leeds United in the third round of the FA Cup on 4 January 2015. Beadling then scored three consecutive goals for club's Under-23s between 9 March 2015 and 6 April 2015.

He captained the club's Under-23s and featured in the first team for their tour of North America in 2015. However, his progressed with ankle injury that saw him sidelined for four months. Beadling scored on his return from injury, in a 2–0 win against Norwich City U21. Weeks after returning from injury, he was called up to the first team once again and appeared as an unused substitute bench twice in the 2015–16 season.

In the 2016–17 season, Beadling appeared two times in the EFL Trophy, including scoring against Wolverhampton Wanderers. In the 2017–18 season, he appeared three times in the EFL Trophy. At the end of the 2017–18 season, Beadling's contract with Sunderland ended.

==== Loan spells from Sunderland ====
On 31 January 2017, Beadling moved to League One side Bury on loan until the end of the 2016–17 season. He appeared two times for the Shakers and returned to his parent club. Sunderland's U23 coach Elliott Dickman felt that Beadling and Andrew Nelson being loaned out would have "thrive under the pressure of playing in the Football League."

A year later, Beadling was again sent out on loan, this time to Scottish Championship club Dunfermline Athletic. He scored on his debut, in a 2–1 lost against Greenock Morton on 3 February 2018. Beadling became a first team regular, playing in the defensive midfield position. However, he suffered a thigh injury that saw him out for the rest of the 2017–18 season.

=== Dunfermline Athletic ===
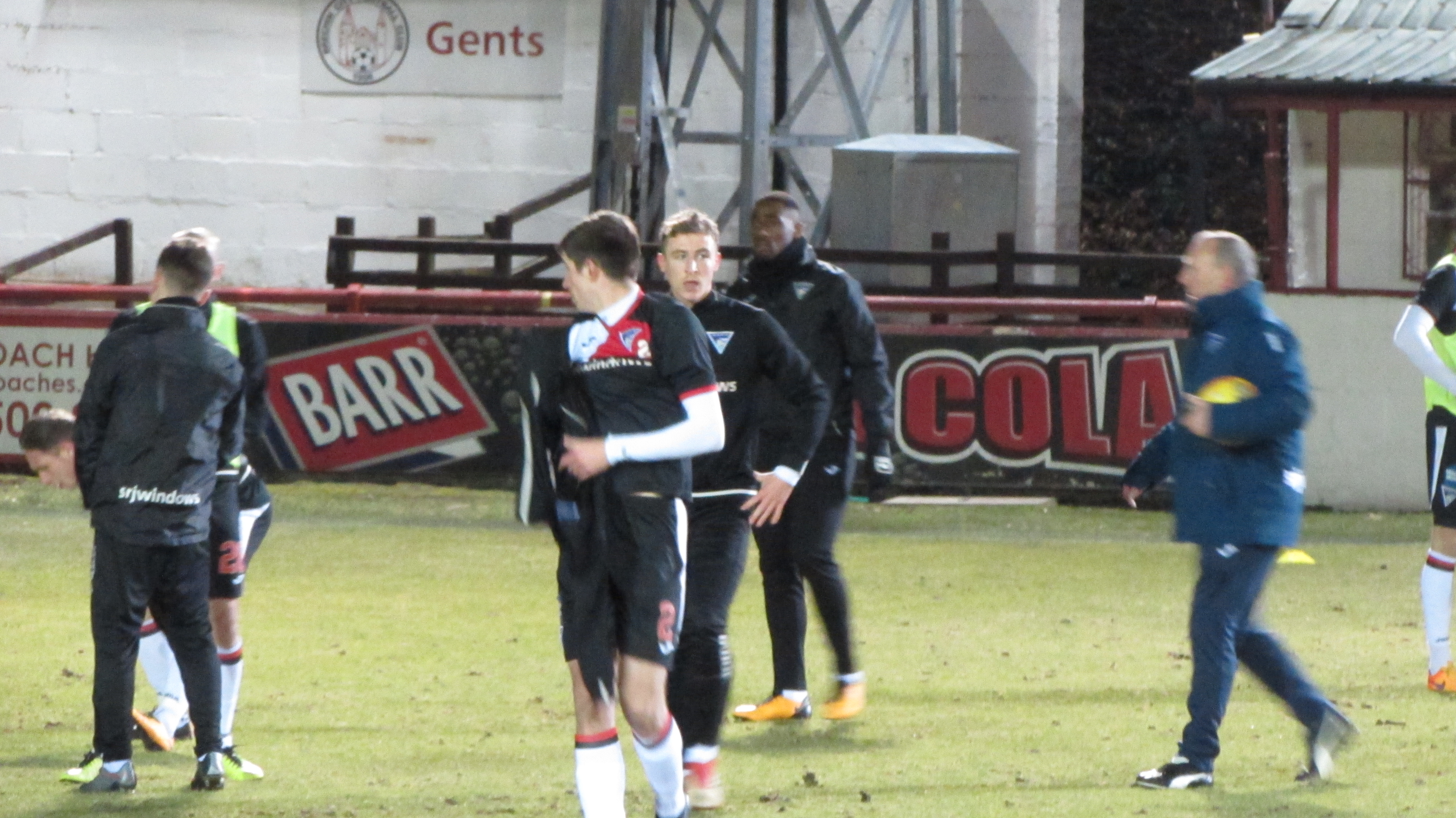
Beadling (third middle) training with his then Dunfermline Athletic teammates in 2018.

After a successful spell with the Pars, during which the club finished in the final Scottish Premiership play-off spot, Beadling signed a two-year pre-contract deal with Dunfermline Athletic, following the end of his contract with Sunderland. On the same day, he was announced to have officially signed with the Pars, Sunderland's new ownership expressed their dismay at the player leaving.

The start of the 2018–19 season continued to see Beadling out with an injury. His first game after signing for the club on a permanent basis came on 14 August 2018, starting the whole game, in a 2–1 win against Inverness CT in the Scottish Challenge Cup. However, his return was short–lived when he was out for two months with an injury. On 13 October 2018, Beadling made his return from injury, coming on as a 66th-minute substitute, against Alloa Athletic in the Scottish Challenge Cup, and he scored in the shootout, as Dunfermline Athletic lose 5–4 on penalties following a 2–2 draw. However, he, once again, suffered an injury that saw him out for a month On 1 December 2018, Beadling made his return from injury, coming on as a 84th-minute substitute, in a 3–0 win against Greenock Morton. On 29 December 2018, he scored his first goals for the Pars, in a 4–2 win against Falkirk. Beadling then scored his third goal for Dunfermline Athletic, in a 2–2 draw against Partick Thistle on 6 April 2019. In a follow–up match against Falkirk, he suffered an injury and was substituted in the 38th minute, as the Pars loss 1–0. As a result, Beadling was out for the rest of the 2018–19 season. At the end of the 2018–19 season, he went on to make twenty–two appearances and scoring three times in all competitions.

The start of the 2019–20 season saw Beadling score three goals in the Scottish League Cup, including one against Celtic, which saw Dunfermline Athletic eliminated in the last sixteen. He became a first team regular, playing in the defensive midfield position. However, the season was curtailed because of the COVID-19 pandemic. By the time the season curtailed ended, Beadling made twenty–eight appearances and scoring three times in all competitions. Shortly after, he was released by the club in May 2020 following the end of his contract.

=== Barrow ===
On 20 July 2020, Beadling signed for his hometown club, Barrow, who were newly promoted to League Two.

He made his debut for the club, starting the whole game, against Derby County, as Barrow loss 5–3 on penalties. Beadling played three times in the centre–back position between 26 September 2020 and 10 October 2020. However, he suffered a groin injury that saw him out for a month. But on 5 December 2020, Beadling made his return from injury, starting a match and playing 71 minutes before being substituted, in a 1–0 loss against Salford City. However, between January 2021 and March 2021, he was out on three occasions, due to injuries. Beadling then scored his first goal for the club, in a 1–1 draw against Colchester United on 5 April 2021. On the last game of the season, he scored second goal for Barrow, in a 1–1 draw against Exeter City. At the end of the 2020–21 season, Beadling went on to make thirty–one appearances and scoring two times in all competitions.

Ahead of the 2021–22 season, however, Beadling suffered a knee injury that kept him out for five months. On 29 December 2021, he made his first appearance of the season, coming on as a 72nd-minute substitute, in a 0–0 draw against Oldham Athletic. However, Beadling's return was short–lived when he received a straight red card in the 38th minute, in a 5–4 loss against Barnsley in the third round of the FA Cup. After serving a three match suspension, he returned to the starting line–up, in a 2–1 loss against Newport County on 29 January 2022. However, Beadling's return was short–lived once again when he suffered an injury that saw him out for five matches. On 12 March 2022, he made his return from injury, coming on as a 73rd-minute substitute, in a 0–0 draw against Rochdale. However, Beadling received a red card for a second bookable offence, in a 1–0 win against Scunthorpe United on 15 March 2022. Once again, he was out on two separate occasions, due to injuries and suspension. At the end of the 2021–22 season, Beadling made twelve appearances in all competitions. Shortly after, he was released following the end of his contract in May 2022.

=== Western Sydney Wanderers ===
On 1 July 2022, Beadling returned to Australia to sign for A-League Men side Western Sydney Wanderers.

However, in the pre–season, he suffered an injury that kept him out until January. Beadling made his debut for the club on 11 February 2023, in a 0–1 defeat to Sydney FC. Following this, he was featured mostly in the centre–back position. On 15 April 2023, Beadling helped Western Sydney Wanderers beat Melbourne Victory 2–1 to earn the Finals Series for the first time in six years. However, the club were eliminated in the elimination finals after losing 2–1 against Sydney FC. At the end of the 2022–23 season, he went on to make ten appearances in all competitions. Following this, Beadling signed a two–year contract extension with Western Sydney Wanderers.

At the start of the 2023–24 season, Beadling continued to feature in the centre–back position for Western Sydney Wanderers. He set up one of the goals to help the club beat Adelaide United 5–1 in the last 16 of the Australian Cup. However, in a match against Adelaide United on 15 December 2023, Beadling suffered a groin injury and was substituted in the 18th minute, as Western Sydney Wanderers won 1–0. On 12 January 2024, he made his return from injury, coming on as a 69th-minute substitute, in a 1–0 win against Melbourne City. However, Beadling's return was short–lived when he was sent–off in the 52nd minute for a foul on Ulises Dávila, as the club loss 4–3 against Macarthur FC on 4 February 2024. After serving a three match suspension, Beadling made his return to the first team, coming on as a 56th-minute substitute, in a 4–1 loss against Sydney FC on 2 March 2024. However, in a match against Sydney FC on 13 April 2024, he scored an own goal and then suffered an injury that saw him substituted in the 58th minute, as Western Sydney Wanderers lost 2–1. Following this, Beadling was out for the rest of the 2023–24 season and finished the season, making twenty appearances in all competitions.

Beadling made his only appearance of the 2024–25 season, coming on as a 74th-minute substitute, against Adelaide United in the Australian Cup, as Western Sydney Wanderers lost 2–1 after playing extra time and the club was eliminated from the tournament. After two and a half years at Western Sydney Wanderers, Beadling and the club mutually terminated his contract on 5 December 2024.

== International career ==
In 2009, Beadling was selected as part of an Australian under-13 national representative side. In 2013, he was selected for an Australia under-20 camp in London.

== Career statistics ==
As of 7 May 2023

Club	Season	League			National Cup		League Cup		Other		Total	
Club	Season	Division	Apps	Goals	Apps	Goals	Apps	Goals	Apps	Goals	Apps	Goals
Sunderland	2014–15	Premier League	0	0	0	0	0	0	—		0	0
Sunderland	2015–16	Premier League	0	0	0	0	0	0	—		0	0
Sunderland	2016–17	Premier League	0	0	0	0	0	0	—		0	0
Sunderland	2017–18	EFL Championship	0	0	0	0	0	0	—		0	0
Sunderland	Total		0	0	0	0	0	0	0	0	0	0
Sunderland U23s	2016–17	Premier League 2, Div. 1	—						2 (Note: Appearances in the EFL Trophy)	1	2	1
Sunderland U23s	2017–18	Premier League 2, Div. 1	—						2	0	2	0
Sunderland U23s	Total		—						4	1	4	1
Bury (loan)	2016–17	EFL League One	2	0	0	0	0	0	0	0	2	0
Dunfermline Athletic (loan)	2017–18	Scottish Championship	11	1	0	0	0	0	0	0	11	1
Dunfermline Athletic	2018–19	Scottish Championship	19	3	1	0	0	0	2 (Note: Appearances in the Scottish Challenge Cup)	0	22	3
Dunfermline Athletic	2019–20	Scottish Championship	21	0	1	0	5	3	1	0	28	3
Dunfermline Athletic	Total		40	3	2	0	5	3	3	0	50	6
Barrow	2020–21	EFL League Two	29	2	0	0	1	0	1	0	31	2
Barrow	2021–22	EFL League Two	12	0	1	0	0	0	0	0	13	0
Barrow	Total		41	2	1	0	1	0	1	0	44	2
Western Sydney Wanderers	2022–23	A-League Men	10	0	0	0	—		—		10	0
Western Sydney Wanderers	2023–24	A-League Men	17	0	3	0	—		—		20	0
Western Sydney Wanderers	2024–25	A-League Men	0	0	1	0	—		—		1	0
Western Sydney Wanderers	Total		27	0	4	0	0	0	0	0	31	0
Arbroath	2025–26	Scottish Championship	0	0	0	0	0	0	0	0	0	0
Career total			121	6	7	0	6	3	8	1	142	10
