= Lionel Zouma =

Footballer (born 1993)

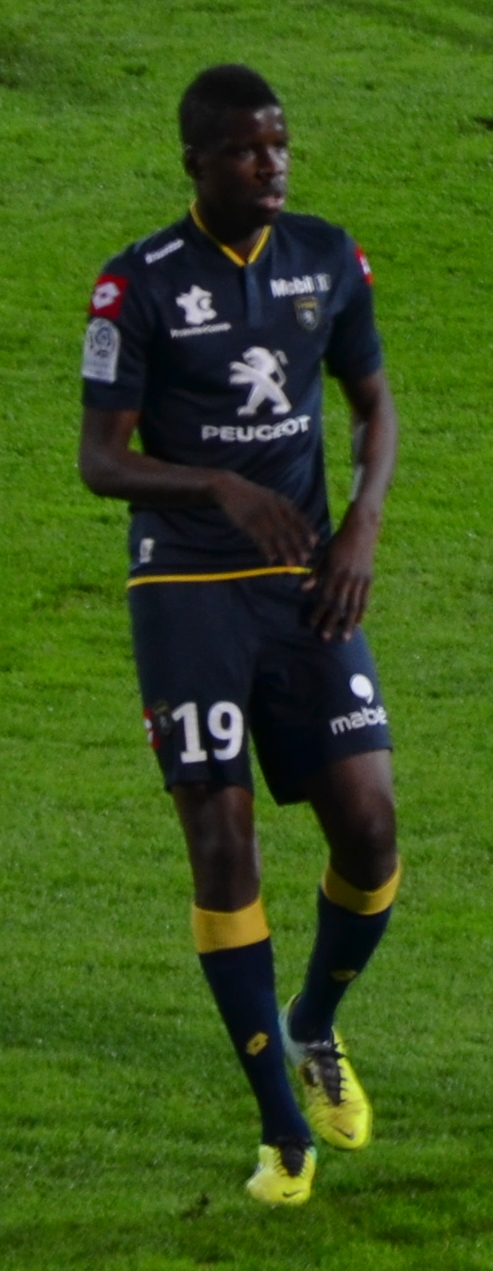
- Zouma with Sochaux in 2013

Personal information
- Full name: Lionel Christopher Zouma
- Date of birth: 10 September 1993 (age 33)
- Place of birth: Lyon, France
- Height: 1.90 m (6 ft 3 in)
- Position: Centre-back

Team information
- Current team: Bourgoin-Jallieu
- Number: 14

Youth career
- 2003–2007: FC Vaulx-en-Velin
- 2007–2010: Sochaux

Senior career*
Years	Team	Apps	(Gls)
2010–2013	Sochaux B	65	(4)
2011–2016	Sochaux	32	(0)
2016–2018	Asteras Tripolis	1	(0)
2018–2019	Bourg-en-Bresse	18	(0)
2019–2020	Dhofar	21	(0)
2021–2023	Vevey-Sports	48	(5)
2024–	Bourgoin-Jallieu	5	(0)

International career
2012	France U19	1	(0)
- * Club domestic league appearances and goals as of 15:24, 31 August 2024 (UTC)

Lionel Christopher Zouma (born 10 September 1993) is a professional footballer who plays as a centre-back for Championnat National 3 club Bourgoin-Jallieu. Born in France, he elected to represent the Central African Republic at international level.

== Club career ==
Born in Lyon, Zouma began his development at Vaulx-en-Velin before moving to Sochaux, where he made his senior debut for their reserve team in CFA (fourth tier) in the second half of the 2010–11 season.

Zouma made his professional debut on 16 October 2011 in a league match against Valenciennes.

On 12 July 2016, Zouma signed a three-year contract with Greek club Asteras Tripolis of Super League Greece. On 25 January 2018, he was released.

Following his release, Zouma trained from March 2018 with Bourg-en-Bresse. On 21 June, following their relegation to the Championnat National, he signed a two-year deal.

In 2019, he moved to Dhofar Club in Oman.

== International career ==
In October 2017, Zouma accepted and was called up for the Central African Republic for the friendly match against Equatorial Guinea in Malabo.

== Personal life ==
Zouma's younger brother, Kurt, plays in the same position for English club West Ham and has represented France at senior level. Another younger brother, Yoan, made his professional debut for Bolton Wanderers in 2019. Their parents emigrated from the Central African Republic.
