= Joel Dixon =

English footballer

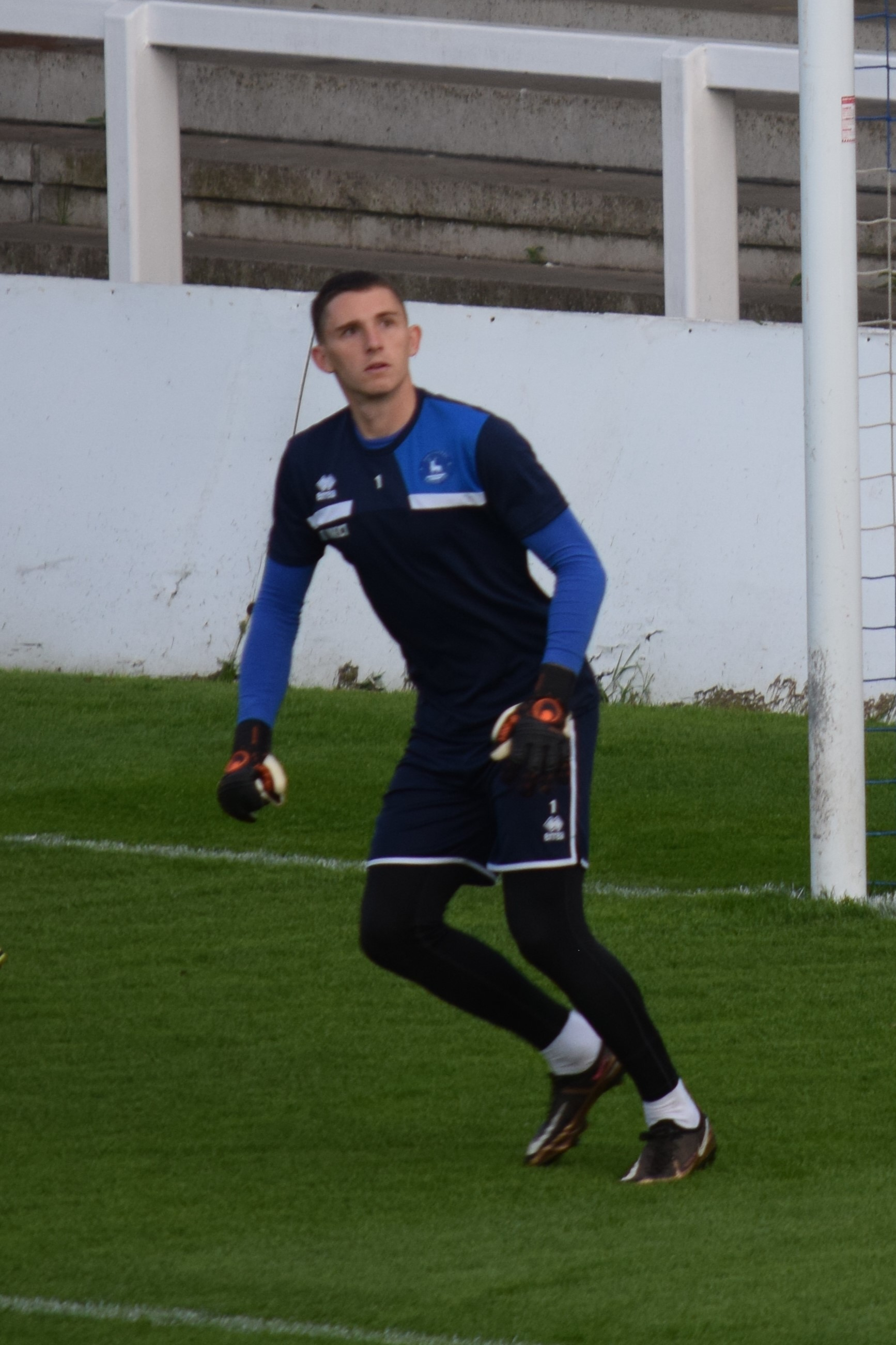
- Dixon warming up for Hartlepool United in 2023

Personal information
- Full name: Joel Stephen Dixon
- Date of birth: 9 December 1993 (age 32)
- Place of birth: Middlesbrough, England
- Height: 6 ft 4 in (1.93 m)
- Position: Goalkeeper

Youth career
- –2012: Sunderland

Senior career*
Years	Team	Apps	(Gls)
2012–2015	Sunderland	0	(0)
2013	→ Workington (loan)	6	(0)
2013	→ Workington (loan)	6	(0)
2014	→ Boston United (loan)	16	(0)
2014	→ Hartlepool United (loan)	0	(0)
2015	→ Gateshead (loan)	6	(0)
2015–2021	Barrow	189	(0)
2021–2023	Bolton Wanderers	24	(0)
2023–2025	Hartlepool United	32	(0)
- * Club domestic league appearances and goals as of 10:44, 1 September 2024 (UTC)

Joel Stephen Dixon (born 9 December 1993) is an English professional footballer who plays as a goalkeeper. He last played for National League side Hartlepool United.

Born in Middlesbrough, Dixon came through the ranks at Sunderland. After loan spells with Workington, Boston United, Hartlepool United and Gateshead, he departed Sunderland in 2015. He joined non-League Barrow and was a member of the team that won promotion to the Football League as champions in 2020. After six seasons with Barrow, he moved to League One club Bolton Wanderers. He won the EFL Trophy in his second season before re-joining Hartlepool United in 2023. After two seasons with Hartlepool he was released.

== Career ==
Born in Middlesbrough, Dixon began his career at Sunderland, spending two loan spells at Workington. He moved on loan to Boston United in November 2014. After a loan spell with Hartlepool United he moved on loan to Gateshead in March 2015.

=== Barrow ===
He moved to Barrow in 2015. Dixon was a part of the Barrow side that won the National League in the 2019–20 season, featuring in all 37 matches, before the early curtailment of the season due to the COVID-19 pandemic with Barrow being awarded the title after the standings were determined on a points-per-game basis. Dixon then appeared in all 46 matches the following season as Barrow avoided relegation. At the end of the 2020–21 season, Dixon was offered a new contract with the club.

=== Bolton Wanderers ===
On 25 June 2021, Bolton Wanderers announced that Dixon would join them on 1 July on a two-year deal after he rejected the contract offer from Barrow. His debut came on 10 August against EFL Championship side Barnsley in the EFL Cup where he kept a clean sheet in a 0–0 draw and then saved Devante Cole's penalty in the resultant penalty shoot-out, helping Bolton win the game. His league debut came the following Saturday away at AFC Wimbledon. He was an unused substitute in the 2023 EFL Trophy final. Bolton went on to win 4–0 against Plymouth Argyle to win the trophy. On 23 May the club confirmed that Dixon would be leaving at the end of his contract in June.

=== Hartlepool United ===
In June 2023 it was announced that Dixon would sign for National League side Hartlepool United on 1 July. He made his Hartlepool debut on the opening match of the season in a 3–2 defeat to Barnet. However, he lost his position as first choice goalkeeper to Peter Jameson after six games. He later returned to the starting eleven at the end of October. At the end of the 2023–24 season, Dixon was made available for transfer having made 28 appearances throughout the campaign. He started the first six matches of the 2024–25 season and kept three consecutive clean sheets. However, in September 2024 it was announced he would be out for a minimum of three months following an ACL injury. He returned to the bench following injury in February 2025 but would suffer a further injury setback. At the end of the 2024–25 season, it was announced that he would be released by Hartlepool at the end of his contract.

== Career statistics ==
As of 31 August 2024

Appearances and goals by club, season and competition
Club	Season	League			FA Cup		League Cup		Other		Total	
Club	Season	Division	Apps	Goals	Apps	Goals	Apps	Goals	Apps	Goals	Apps	Goals
Sunderland	2014–15	Premier League	0	0	0	0	0	0	0	0	0	0
Boston United (loan)	2014–15	Conference North	16	0	0	0	—		3 (Note: Appearance(s) in FA Trophy)	0	19	0
Gateshead (loan)	2014–15	Conference Premier	6	0	0	0	—		0	0	6	0
Barrow	2015–16	National League	46	0	1	0	—		2	0	49	0
Barrow	2016–17	National League	21	0	3	0	—		0	0	24	0
Barrow	2017–18	National League	11	0	1	0	—		3	0	15	0
Barrow	2018–19	National League	28	0	0	0	—		0	0	28	0
Barrow	2019–20	National League	37	0	1	0	—		1	0	39	0
Barrow	2020–21	League Two	46	0	0	0	1	0	1 (Note: Appearance(s) in EFL Trophy)	0	48	0
Barrow	Total		189	0	6	0	1	0	7	0	203	0
Bolton Wanderers	2021–22	League One	23	0	2	0	1	0	3	0	29	0
Bolton Wanderers	2022–23	League One	1	0	0	0	2	0	4	0	7	0
Bolton Wanderers	Total		24	0	2	0	3	0	7	0	36	0
Hartlepool United	2023–24	National League	26	0	0	0	—		2	0	28	0
Hartlepool United	2024–25	National League	6	0	0	0	—		0	0	6	0
Hartlepool United	Total		32	0	0	0	0	0	2	0	34	0
Career Total			267	0	8	0	4	0	19	0	298	0

== Honours ==
Barrow

- National League: 2019–20

Bolton Wanderers

- EFL Trophy: 2022–23
