= Dwight McNeil =

English footballer (born 1999)

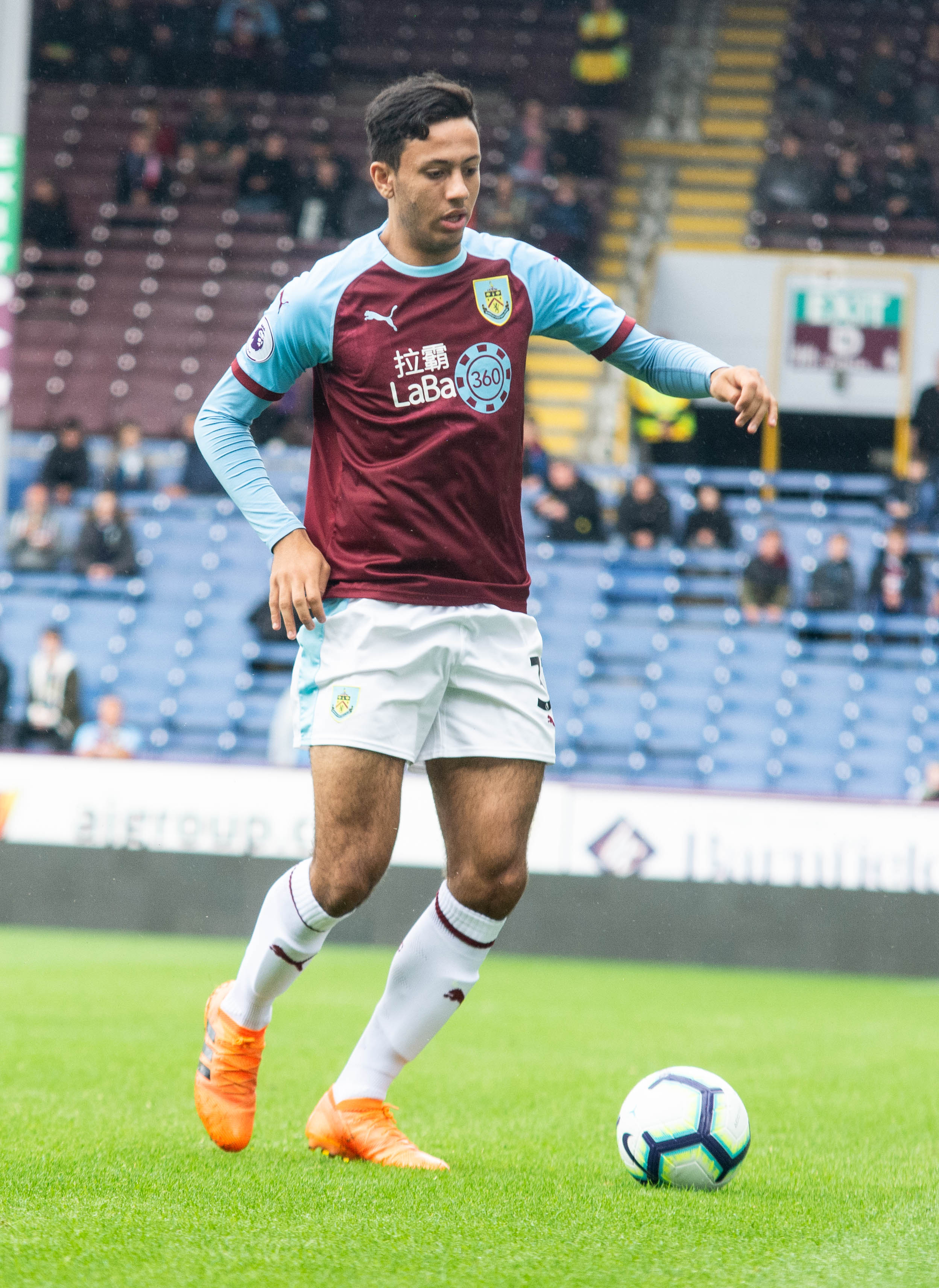
- McNeil playing for Burnley in 2018

Personal information
- Full name: Dwight James Matthew McNeil
- Date of birth: 22 November 1999 (age 26)
- Place of birth: Rochdale, England
- Height: 6 ft 0 in (1.83 m)
- Positions: Winger; attacking midfielder

Team information
- Current team: Crystal Palace
- Number: 11

Youth career
- –2014: Manchester United
- 2014–2018: Burnley

Senior career*
Years	Team	Apps	(Gls)
2018–2022	Burnley	134	(7)
2022–2026	Everton	114	(14)
2026–	Crystal Palace	6	(0)

International career
2019	England U20	6	(1)
2019–2021	England U21	10	(0)
- * Club domestic league appearances and goals as of 19:30, 31 October 2026 (UTC)

Dwight James Matthew McNeil (born 22 November 1999) is an English professional footballer who plays as a winger or attacking midfielder for Premier League club Crystal Palace.

== Early life ==
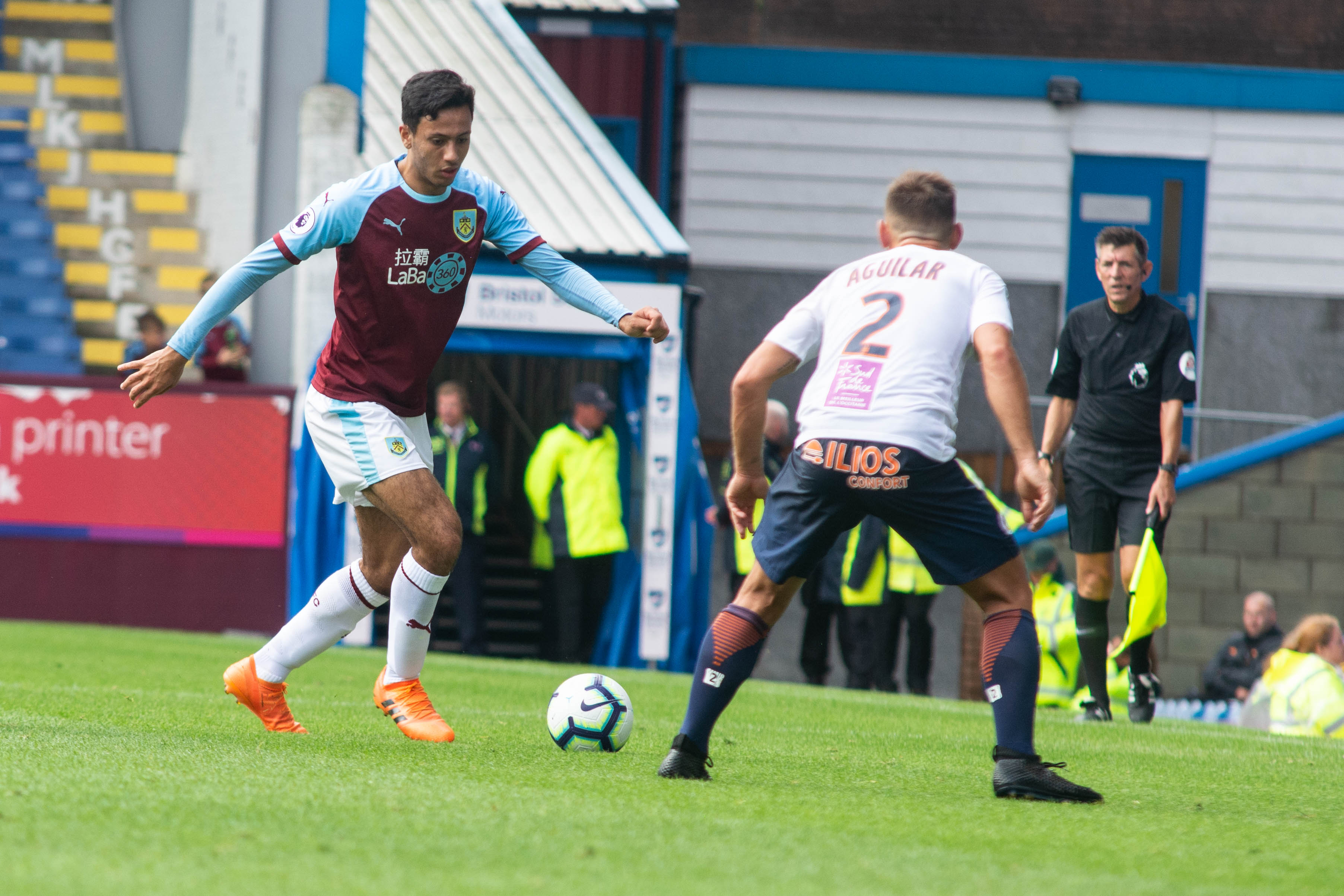
McNeil (left) playing for Burnley in 2018

Dwight James Matthew McNeil was born on 22 November 1999 in Rochdale, Greater Manchester, to parents Tracy and Matty McNeil, who is a former professional footballer. McNeil has two younger siblings, Baillie and Chiara, and he attended the Oasis Academy in Oldham. He regularly watched his father play in non-League football for Hyde United and first started playing football at the JJB Sports centre in Trafford. It was there that scouts from Bolton Wanderers pursued him for a trial, but after initial rejections from his parents, Bolton eventually got their way and he started training with them.

== Club career ==
=== Early career ===
At age five, he was offered the chance to join the academy at Manchester United, the club he supported as a child. He stayed in the United academy until the age of 14 when he started struggling for game time and was subsequently released.

=== Burnley ===
Within a week of his release, McNeil went on trial at Burnley's Academy. In July 2016, he was rewarded with a two-year scholarship and was a regular member of the under-18 squad and occasionally played for the Development Squad. In February 2018, he travelled with the first-team squad for the Premier League match against Swansea City but failed to make the match-day squad. On 10 April 2018, following the end of his scholarship, he signed a professional two-year contract with Burnley with the option of a third year in the club's favour. On 13 May 2018, he made his first-team debut in the final match of the 2017–18 season when he replaced Aaron Lennon as a late substitute in the 2–1 home defeat to AFC Bournemouth. McNeil scored his first goal for the club in a 2–0 home win against West Ham United on 30 December 2018. On 16 October 2020, McNeil signed a new long-term contract, keeping him at the club until 2024.

=== Everton ===
On 28 July 2022, McNeil signed for Premier League club Everton on a five-year contract. Burnley and Everton came to an agreement for a transfer fee reportedly in the region of £20 million, including potential add-ons. On 6 August, McNeil made his debut for the club in a 1–0 loss against Chelsea in the Premier League. On 1 October 2022, McNeil scored his first goal for Everton in a 2–1 away win over Southampton. On 28 September 2024, McNeil scored a brace against Crystal Palace, helping Everton defeat Crystal Palace 2–1 to get the club's first win of the season. McNeil was set to make a loan move to Crystal Palace with an agreed £20 million transfer obligation on 1 February 2026; however, the deal collapsed as paperwork was not finalised before the transfer deadline. McNeil's partner later took to social media to criticise Crystal Palace and the effect that the failed transfer had on McNeil's mental health.

=== Crystal Palace ===
On 11 August 2026, McNeil joined Crystal Palace on a four-year contract. The deal included Brennan Johnson joining Everton as part of a swap deal. On 22 August, McNeil made his debut for the club, starting in a 2–0 defeat against his former club Everton.

== International career ==
In March 2019, McNeil received his first call-up for the England national under-20 team ahead of 2018–19 Under 20 Elite League fixtures against Poland and Portugal. McNeil made his debut as a starter in a 3–1 defeat to Poland at St George's Park. In May 2019, he was included in the U20 squad for the 2019 Toulon Tournament and scored his first international goal during the 4–0 victory over Guatemala on 11 June 2019.

On 30 August 2019, McNeil was included in the England under-21 team for the first time. He eventually made his debut in a 2–2 draw against Slovenia in Maribor on 11 October.

On 15 March 2021, McNeil was called up for the 2021 UEFA European Under-21 Championship in Slovenia and Hungary.

== Personal life ==
He is of Jamaican descent.

== Career statistics ==
As of match played 31 October 2026

Appearances and goals by club, season and competition
Club	Season	League			FA Cup		EFL Cup		Europe		Total	
Club	Season	Division	Apps	Goals	Apps	Goals	Apps	Goals	Apps	Goals	Apps	Goals
Burnley	2017–18	Premier League	1	0	0	0	0	0	—		1	0
Burnley	2018–19	Premier League	21	3	2	0	1	0	2 (Note: Appearances in UEFA Europa League)	0	26	3
Burnley	2019–20	Premier League	38	2	1	0	1	0	—		40	2
Burnley	2020–21	Premier League	36	2	2	0	2	0	—		40	2
Burnley	2021–22	Premier League	38	0	0	0	2	0	—		40	0
Burnley	Total		134	7	5	0	6	0	2	0	147	7
Everton	2022–23	Premier League	36	7	1	0	2	0	—		39	7
Everton	2023–24	Premier League	35	3	3	0	3	0	—		41	3
Everton	2024–25	Premier League	21	4	0	0	2	1	—		23	5
Everton	2025–26	Premier League	22	0	1	0	2	0	—		25	0
Everton	Total		114	14	5	0	9	1	—		128	15
Crystal Palace	2026–27	Premier League	6	0	0	0	1	0	3	0	10	0
Career total			254	21	10	0	16	1	5	0	285	22

== Honours ==
Individual

- Burnley Youth Team Player of the Year: 2017–18
- Everton Young Player of the Season: 2022–23
