= Callum Gribbin =

English footballer

Personal information
- Full name: Callum Anthony Gribbin
- Date of birth: 18 December 1998 (age 27)
- Place of birth: Salford, England
- Height: 1.78 m (5 ft 10 in)
- Position: Attacking midfielder

Team information
- Current team: FC United of Manchester

Youth career
- 2008–2019: Manchester United
- 2019–2020: Sheffield United

Senior career*
Years	Team	Apps	(Gls)
2020–2021	Barrow	1	(0)
2021–2022	Radcliffe	19	(5)
2022–2025	FC United of Manchester	21	(3)

International career^{‡}
2013-2014	England U16	7	(0)
2015	England U17	3	(0)
- * Club domestic league appearances and goals as of 17:10, 22 February 2023 (UTC) ‡ National team caps and goals as of 11:51, 25 January 2016 (UTC)

Callum Anthony Gribbin (born 18 December 1998) is an English professional footballer who most recently played for F.C. United of Manchester.

Gribbin began his career in the academy of Manchester United, joining in 2008 and spending 11 years with the club before being released. He signed for Sheffield United, and spent a year at the club without making any appearances. He joined Barrow in 2020 for their first campaign in the English Football League in 50 years, where he made his professional debut. After one season, he left Barrow and eventually signed for non-league Radcliffe.

Internationally, he has represented England's U16 and U17 teams, earning 10 caps between 2013 and 2015.

== Club career ==
Having joined Manchester United's academy from a young age, Gribbin received praise from various newspapers while playing for the Under 18 squad. In the 2014/15 season, Gribbin scored a free kick, which led to him being compared to Ryan Giggs. In the final game of that season Gribbin made his under 21's debut against Manchester City when he was 16 years old. During that season Gribbin was scouted by Liverpool and Manchester City. Gribbin signed a new four-year deal with the club in the summer of 2015, a one year scholarship with a three year professional contract. In the 2015–16 season Gribbin made his Under 19 debut in the UEFA Youth League and was praised for his performance against VfL Wolfsburg with Nicky Butt describing him as having a "light bulb moment".

At the end of his Manchester United contract Gribbin signed for Sheffield United in 2019 and featured for their Under 23 team. Gribbin left the club the following summer.

He moved to Barrow in August 2020. Gribbin made only one league appearance in an injury plagued season before departing in June 2021.

In November 2021, Gribbin signed for Northern Premier League Premier Division team Radcliffe.

In August 2022, he transferred to divisional rivals FC United of Manchester.

== International career ==
Gribbin has represented England at under-16 and under-17 levels.

== Career statistics ==
As of match played 28 January 2023

Appearances and goals by club, season and competition
Club	Season	League			FA Cup		League Cup		Other		Total	
Club	Season	Division	Apps	Goals	Apps	Goals	Apps	Goals	Apps	Goals	Apps	Goals
Barrow	2020–21	League Two	1	0	1	0	0	0	3 (Note: Appearances in EFL Trophy)	0	5	0
Radcliffe	2021–22	NPL Premier Division	19	5	—		—		2 (Note: Appearances in FA Trophy)	0	21	5
FC United of Manchester	2022–23	NPL Premier Division	21	3	2	0	—		1	0	24	3
Career total			41	8	3	0	0	0	6	0	50	8
