= Yoan Zouma =

Central African Republic footballer (born 1998)

Personal information
- Full name: Lindsay Yoan Zouma
- Date of birth: 6 May 1998 (age 28)
- Place of birth: Lyon, France
- Height: 1.93 m (6 ft 4 in)
- Position: Defender

Team information
- Current team: Lyon-La Duchère
- Number: 23

Youth career
- FC Vaulx-en-Velin
- Olympique Lyonnais
- –2018: Angers

Senior career*
Years	Team	Apps	(Gls)
2017–2018	Angers II	11	(0)
2018–2020	Bolton Wanderers	17	(0)
2020–2021	Barrow	4	(0)
2021	→ Altrincham (loan)	5	(0)
2021–2023	Dagenham and Redbridge	9	(0)
2023	→ Maidstone United (loan)	6	(0)
2023–2024	Havant & Waterlooville	12	(0)
2024	→ Poole Town (loan)	5	(0)
2025–	Lyon-La Duchère	13	(0)

International career^{‡}
2026–	Central African Republic	1	(0)
- * Club domestic league appearances and goals as of 7 February 2026 ‡ National team caps and goals as of 9 June 2026

Lindsay Yoan Zouma (born 6 May 1998) is a professional footballer who plays as a centre-back for Championnat National 3 club Lyon-La Duchère. Born in France, he represents the Central African Republic national team.

== Career ==
He joined Bolton Wanderers on a two-year contract from Angers SCO on 13 August 2018 and joined Bolton's U23 team. He made his professional debut on 3 August 2019 as Bolton began their EFL League One season with a 2–0 loss at Wycombe Wanderers, with his club playing an unfamiliar line-up due to their financial crisis. On 26 June it was announced Zouma would be one of 14 senior players released at the end of his contract on 30 June.

On 1 October 2020, Zouma joined League Two side Barrow. On 1 March 2021, Zouma joined National League side Altrincham on a one-month loan deal. The loan was then extended for the remainder of the 2020–21 season. On 18 May 2021, Barrow announced he would be released at the end of his contract.

On 18 December 2021, he signed for National League side Dagenham & Redbridge. On 10 February 2022, he was suspended by Dagenham & Redbridge for his role in filming his brother, Kurt, kicking and slapping his pet cat. Zouma made his return to Dagenham's team on 8 March 2022, being named in the 16-man squad to play Yeovil Town. On 6 January 2023, he signed for Maidstone United for the remainder of the 2022–23 season, but scored an own goal on his debut and barely featured thereafter. He was released by parent club Dagenham & Redbridge in the summer of 2023.

In September 2023, Zouma signed for National League South club Havant & Waterlooville. In March 2024, he joined Southern League Premier Division South club Poole Town on loan until the end of the season.

== International career ==
Born in France, Zouma is of Cenral African descent. He was called up to the Central African Republic national team for a set of friendlies in June 2026.

== Personal life ==
His older brothers are West Ham United and France defender Kurt Zouma, and Lionel Zouma.

=== Animal abuse ===
On 7 February 2022, footage emerged of Kurt Zouma kicking and slapping his cat, filmed at his home by Yoan. On 16 March 2022, the RSPCA announced that after a full investigation they had started the process of bringing a prosecution against both Kurt and Yoan Zouma under the Animal Welfare Act.

On 24 May 2022, Yoan Zouma pleaded guilty to one count of aiding, abetting, counselling or procuring his brother to commit an offence, after Kurt Zouma pleaded guilty to two counts of causing unnecessary suffering to a protected animal.

== Career statistics ==
As of match played 29 April 2023

Appearances and goals by club, season and competition
Club	Season	League			FA Cup		EFL Cup		Other		Total	
Club	Season	Division	Apps	Goals	Apps	Goals	Apps	Goals	Apps	Goals	Apps	Goals
Bolton Wanderers	2019–20	League One	17	0	1	0	1	0	4 (Note: Appearance(s) in the EFL Trophy.)	0	23	0
Barrow	2020–21	League Two	4	0	1	0	0	0	2	0	7	0
Altrincham (loan)	2020–21	National League	5	0	—		—		—		5	0
Dagenham & Redbridge	2021–22	National League	6	0	—		—		2 (Note: Appearance(s) in the FA Trophy.)	0	8	0
Dagenham & Redbridge	2022–23	National League	3	0	0	0	—		0	0	3	0
Dagenham & Redbridge	Total		9	0	0	0	—		2	0	11	0
Maidstone United (loan)	2022–23	National League	6	0	—		—		0	0	6	0
Career total			41	0	2	0	1	0	8	0	52	0
