= Lewis Hardcastle =

Association football player

Personal information
- Full name: Lewis James Hardcastle
- Date of birth: 4 July 1998 (age 28)
- Place of birth: Bolton, England
- Height: 5 ft 9 in (1.75 m)
- Position: Midfielder

Youth career
- 2004–2015: Blackburn Rovers

Senior career*
Years	Team	Apps	(Gls)
2015–2019	Blackburn Rovers	0	(0)
2015	→ Salford City (loan)	10	(0)
2018–2019	→ Port Vale (loan)	6	(0)
2019	→ Barrow (loan)	9	(2)
2019–2021	Barrow	54	(4)
Total		79	(6)

Managerial career
- 2022: Daisy Hill
- * Club domestic league appearances and goals

Lewis James Hardcastle (born 4 July 1998) is an English football manager and former footballer who played as a midfielder.

Having been with Blackburn Rovers since the age of six, he turned professional at the club in December 2015 after impressing on loan at Salford City. He captained the Blackburn Rovers U23 team to the Premier League 2 Division 2 title during the 2017–18 season. He joined Port Vale on loan for the first half of the 2018–19 season and signed permanently with Barrow in February 2019 following a loan spell. He helped Barrow to win promotion into the Football League as champions of the National League in the 2019–20 season.

Hardcastle retired from football in March 2021, aged 22, after being diagnosed with a heart condition. He was appointed manager of Daisy Hill in February 2022.

== Club career ==
=== Blackburn Rovers ===
Hardcastle joined the Academy at Blackburn Rovers at the age of six. He played 12 games for the under-18 team during the 2013–14 season. He appeared for the under-21 team in the second leg of the Under-21 Premier League Cup final defeat to Southampton at St Mary's Stadium on 20 April 2015, coming on as a 57th-minute substitute for David Carson in what ended as a 2–1 defeat after extra time. He scored two goals in 22 appearances for the under-18's during the 2014–15 season.

On 24 September 2015, Hardcastle joined Northern Premier League Premier Division side Salford City on a one-month loan deal. The 17-year-old's loan deal was later extended to three months, after which time co-manager Anthony Johnson said that "we're devastated to be losing him because he's been an integral part of what we've done". He helped the "Ammies" to reach the second round of the FA Cup, eliminating Notts County in the first round with a 2–0 win at Moor Lane. He signed his first professional contract with Rovers whilst at Salford, after manager Paul Lambert gave him a 2 1/2-year contract. He returned to playing for the "Riversiders" youth team and scored the only goal of the game against Luton Town in the quarter-finals of the FA Youth Cup. He scored three goals in 26 youth team appearances during the 2015–16 season and scored two goals in 33 youth-team appearances during the 2016–17 season, including three appearances in the EFL Trophy. In November 2017 he signed a new contract to keep him at Ewood Park until the summer of 2019. He went on to captain the under-23 team to the Premier League 2 Division 2 title at the end of the 2017–18 season.

On 30 August 2018, Hardcastle joined EFL League Two side Port Vale on loan for the rest of the 2018–19 season. He said that "the gaffer (Tony Mowbray) said to me I needed to go out and play games in men's football, come back strong and fit and you never know" and that he was "excited about the challenge" in playing in the English Football League. He made his first-team debut two days later after starting in a 2–1 defeat to Newport County at Vale Park. However, he made only five starts and four substitute appearances for Neil Aspin's "Valiants" before he was recalled to Blackburn on 7 January.

=== Barrow ===
On 8 February 2019, he joined National League side Barrow on an initial one-month youth loan. The deal was made into a permanent move on 28 March after he impressed "Bluebirds" boss Ian Evatt with his dynamism and bravery in midfield; he signed a contract to run until summer 2020. He scored three goals in 41 appearances in the 2019–20 season, which was permanently suspended on 26 March due to the COVID-19 pandemic in England, with Barrow top of the table. Though the season was not resumed, Barrow went on to be promoted to the Football League as National League champions.

On 24 March 2021, Hardcastle announced his retirement from football at the age of 22 after being diagnosed with a heart problem (arrhythmogenic right ventricular cardiomyopathy). An Implantable cardioverter-defibrillator was fitted to his heart to keep him alive.

== International career ==
Hardcastle was called up to England C team for their friendly fixture against Wales C on 24 March 2020. The match was cancelled due to the COVID-19 pandemic in England.

== Style of play ==
Hardcastle played as a box-to-box midfielder.

== Coaching career ==
In February 2022, Hardcastle was announced to be the new head coach of NWCFL Division One North club Daisy Hill.

== Career statistics ==
Appearances and goals by club, season and competition
Club	Season	League			FA Cup		EFL Cup		Other		Total	
Club	Season	Division	Apps	Goals	Apps	Goals	Apps	Goals	Apps	Goals	Apps	Goals
Blackburn Rovers	2015–16	Championship	0	0	0	0	0	0	—		0	0
Blackburn Rovers	2016–17	EFL Championship	0	0	0	0	0	0	—		0	0
Blackburn Rovers	2017–18	EFL League One	0	0	0	0	0	0	—		0	0
Blackburn Rovers	2018–19	EFL Championship	0	0	0	0	0	0	—		0	0
Blackburn Rovers	Total		0	0	0	0	0	0	0	0	0	0
Salford City (loan)	2015–16	Northern Premier	10	0	7	0	—		2 (Note: 1 appearance in the FA Trophy and 1 appearance in the Northern Premier League Challenge Cup)	0	19	0
Blackburn Rovers U23	2016–17	—			—		—		3 (Note: Appearance(s) in the EFL Trophy)	0	3	0
Port Vale (loan)	2018–19	League Two	6	0	0	0	—		3	0	9	0
Barrow	2018–19	National League	15	3	0	0	—		0	0	15	3
Barrow	2019–20	National League	36	2	1	0	—		4 (Note: Appearances in the FA Trophy)	1	41	3
Barrow	2020–21	League Two	12	1	0	0	1	0	0	0	13	1
Barrow	Total		63	6	1	0	1	0	4	1	69	7
Career total			79	6	8	0	1	0	12	1	100	7

== Honours ==
Blackburn Rovers U23

- Premier League Cup runner-up: 2015
- Premier League 2 Division 2: 2017–18

Barrow

- National League: 2019–20
