= Jack Hindle (footballer, born 1993) =

English footballer

Personal information
- Full name: Jack Raymond Hindle
- Date of birth: 29 October 1993 (age 33)
- Place of birth: Warrington, England
- Height: 1.78 m (5 ft 10 in)
- Position: Striker

Team information
- Current team: Werribee City

Senior career*
Years	Team	Apps	(Gls)
- Radcliffe Borough
- 1874 Northwich
- Colwyn Bay
2018–2021	Barrow	70	(13)
2020	→ Gateshead (loan)	1	(0)
2020	→ South Shields (loan)	2	(0)
2021	Kelantan	10	(3)
2022	Matlock Town	1	(0)
2022	Radcliffe	6	(0)
2022–2023	Flint Town United	10	(0)
2023	Warrington Rylands	6	(1)
2023	Peninsula Power	7	(3)
2023	Gioiese 1918		
2024–	Werribee City	2	(0)
- * Club domestic league appearances and goals as of 10:39, 28 February 2024 (UTC)

Jack Raymond Hindle (born 29 October 1993) is an English professional footballer who plays as a striker for Werribee City.

== Career ==
Born in Warrington, Hindle signed for Barrow in 2018, having previously played for Radcliffe Borough, 1874 Northwich and Colwyn Bay. He was Barrow's top scorer in the 2018–19 season, but struggled for form at the start of the 2019–20 season due to personal issues. He moved on loan to Gateshead in February 2020, and to Northern Premier League side South Shields on loan until the end of the year, for whom he made 6 appearances in all competitions. He was released by Barrow on 3 January 2021 after his contract expired. On 14 February 2021 he signed for Malaysian club Kelantan, scoring 3 goals in 10 league games for the club. On 28 January 2022, Hindle signed for Northern Premier League Premier Division side Matlock Town. On 3 March 2022, Hindle signed for former side Radcliffe. In August 2022, Hindle signed for Flint Town United in the Cymru Premier. He returned to England to join Warrington Rylands in March 2023. After six appearances for Rylands, Hindle joined NPL Queensland side Peninsula Power in June 2023. In August 2023, he joined Serie D side Gioiese 1918. In February 2024, Hindle returned to Australia to sign for Victoria Premier League 1 side Werribee City.
