= Dan Bramall (footballer) =

English footballer

Personal information
- Date of birth: 3 September 1998 (age 28)
- Place of birth: Chesterfield, England
- Position: Winger

Team information
- Current team: Worksop Town

Youth career
- Chesterfield
- 2014–2019: Everton

Senior career*
Years	Team	Apps	(Gls)
2019–2020	Matlock Town	17	(4)
2020	Buxton	1	(0)
2020–2021	Barnsley	0	(0)
2021	→ Barrow (loan)	3	(0)
2021–2022	Ballymena United	15	(0)
2022	Scarborough Athletic	17	(0)
2023	Caroline Springs George Cross		
2024–	Worksop Town	17	(6)
- * Club domestic league appearances and goals as of 17:41, 25 November 2024 (UTC)

Dan Bramall (born 3 September 1998) is an English professional footballer who plays for Worksop Town, as a winger.

== Career ==
Born in Chesterfield, Bramall played youth football for Chesterfield and Everton, and non-league football for Matlock Town and Buxton. He signed for Barnsley in September 2020, moving on loan to Barrow in January 2021. He was released by Barnsley at the end of the season.

He signed for Ballymena United in August 2021. In August 2022 he moved to Scarborough Athletic.

In December 2022, Scarborough Athletic announced that Bramall had departed the club in order to take up an opportunity in Australia.

In May 2024, he returned to England to join Worksop Town.

== Career statistics ==
As of 20 February 2021

Appearances and goals by club, season and competition
Club	Season	League			FA Cup		League Cup		Other		Total	
Club	Season	Division	Apps	Goals	Apps	Goals	Apps	Goals	Apps	Goals	Apps	Goals
Matlock Town	2019–20	NPL Premier Division	17	4	2	0	2	0	5 (Note: Appearances in the FA Trophy.)	0	26	4
Buxton	2019–20	NPL Premier Division	1	0	0	0	0	0	0	0	1	0
Barnsley	2020–21	Championship	0	0	0	0	0	0	0	0	0	0
Barrow (loan)	2020–21	League Two	3	0	0	0	0	0	0	0	3	0
Career total			21	4	2	0	2	0	5	0	30	4
