= Bobby Thomas (footballer) =

English footballer (born 2001)

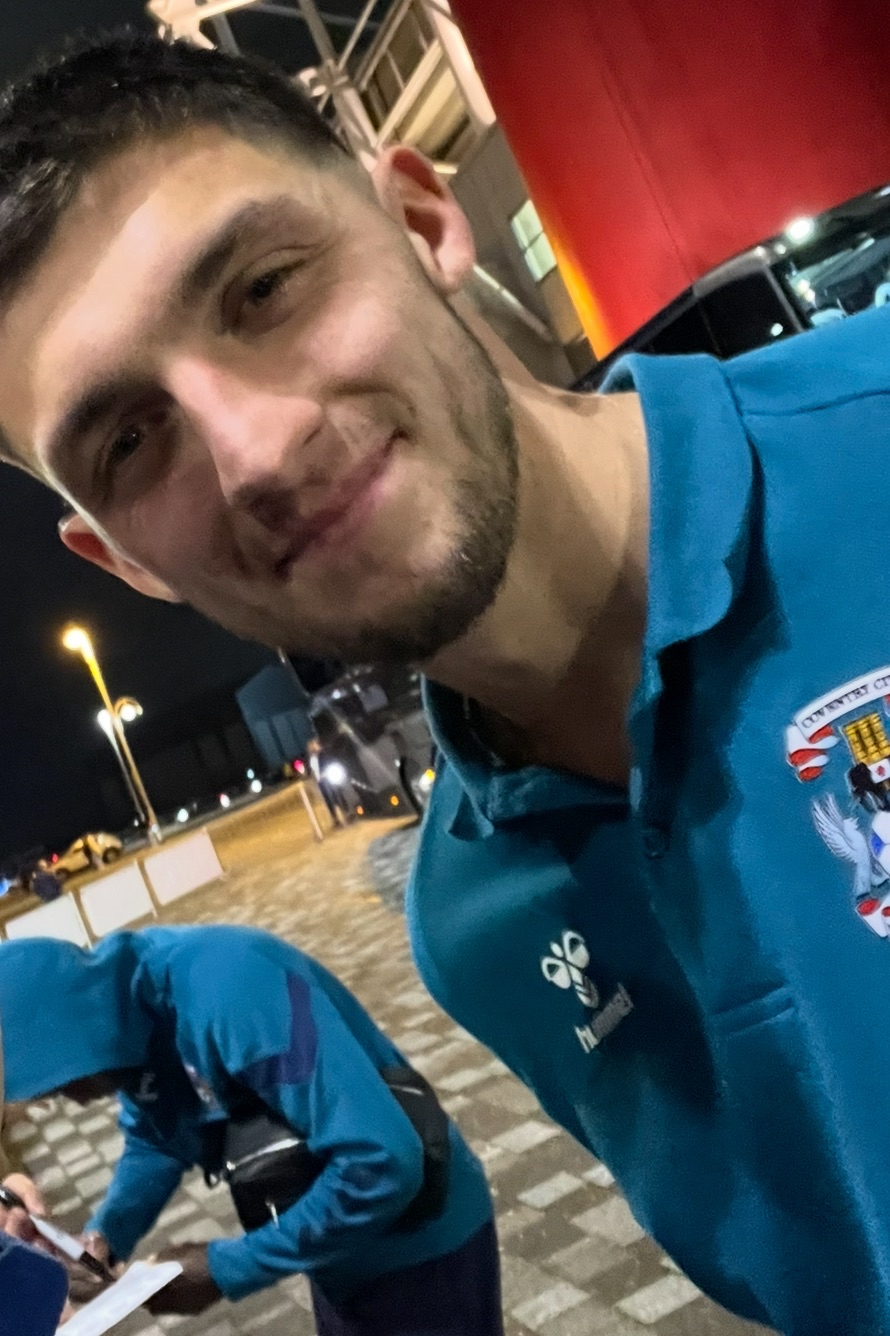
- Thomas with Coventry City in 2024

Personal information
- Full name: Bobby Craig Thomas
- Date of birth: 30 January 2001 (age 25)
- Place of birth: Chester, England
- Height: 6 ft 4 in (1.93 m)
- Position: Defender

Team information
- Current team: Coventry City
- Number: 4

Youth career
- Everton
- –2017: Crewe Alexandra
- 2017–2020: Burnley

Senior career*
Years	Team	Apps	(Gls)
2018–2023	Burnley	0	(0)
2018	→ Kendal Town (loan)		
2021	→ Barrow (loan)	21	(1)
2022–2023	→ Bristol Rovers (loan)	19	(3)
2023	→ Barnsley (loan)	22	(3)
2023–	Coventry City	115	(9)
- * Club domestic league appearances and goals as of 20:54, 18 August 2025 (UTC)

Bobby Craig Thomas (born 30 January 2001) is an English professional footballer who plays as a defender for Premier League club Coventry City.

== Career ==
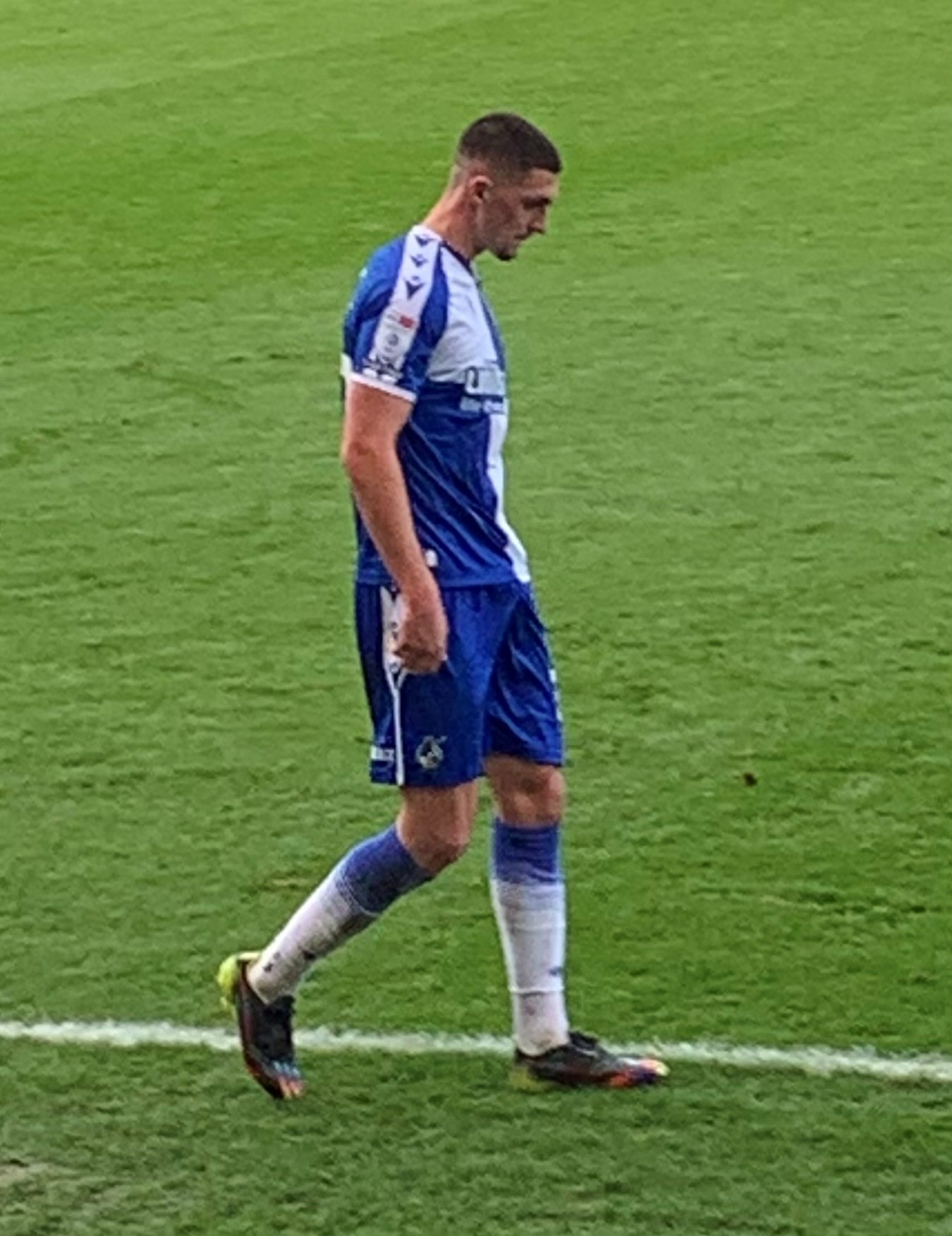
Thomas at Bristol Rovers in 2022

=== Burnley ===
In March 2018, Thomas signed his first professional deal with Burnley, signing a two-year contract. In November 2018, he went out on a months youth loan to Northern Premier League side Kendal Town. He was named as the club's young player of the year at the end of the 2018–19 season. On 23 September 2020, Thomas made his senior debut for Burnley, playing the full match in a 2–0 win over Millwall in the EFL Cup. On 22 January 2021, Thomas joined League Two side Barrow on loan for the remainder of the 2020–21 season.

On 1 September 2022, Thomas signed for EFL League One club Bristol Rovers on a season-long loan deal. Thomas made his debut a couple of days later, playing the duration of a 2–2 home draw with Morecambe, scoring Rovers' second equaliser ten minutes from time.

On 14 January 2023, Thomas joined EFL League One side Barnsley on loan for the remainder of the 2022–23 season.

=== Coventry City ===
On 22 July 2023, Thomas joined EFL Championship side Coventry City on a four-year contract. On 17 April 2026, Thomas scored an equaliser in a 1–1 draw with Blackburn Rovers at Ewood Park to secure Coventry's promotion back to the Premier League.

On 29 May 2026, Thomas signed a new contract following the club's promotion.

== Career statistics ==
As of match played on 26 April 2026

Appearances and goals by club, season and competition
Club	Season	League			FA Cup		League Cup		Other		Total	
Club	Season	Division	Apps	Goals	Apps	Goals	Apps	Goals	Apps	Goals	Apps	Goals
Burnley	2020–21	Premier League	0	0	0	0	1	0	—		1	0
Burnley	2021–22	Premier League	0	0	0	0	0	0	—		0	0
Burnley	2022–23	Championship	0	0	—		0	0	—		0	0
Burnley	Total		0	0	0	0	1	0	—		1	0
Barrow (loan)	2020–21	League Two	21	1	—		—		—		21	1
Bristol Rovers (loan)	2022–23	League One	19	3	2	0	—		5 (Note: Appearances in EFL Trophy)	0	26	3
Barnsley (loan)	2022–23	League One	22	3	—		—		3 (Note: Appearances in EFL League One play-offs)	0	25	3
Coventry City	2023–24	Championship	44	2	4	0	0	0	—		48	2
Coventry City	2024–25	Championship	38	5	2	0	3	0	2 (Note: Appearances in EFL Championship play-offs)	0	45	5
Coventry City	2025–26	Championship	33	2	0	0	2	0	—		35	2
Coventry City	Total		115	9	6	0	6	0	2	0	128	9
Career total			177	16	8	0	6	0	10	0	201	16

== Honours ==
Coventry City

- EFL Championship: 2025–26

Individual

- PFA Team of the Year: 2025–26 Championship
