= Mace Goodridge =

English footballer

Personal information
- Full name: Mace Lewin Goodridge
- Date of birth: 13 September 1999 (age 27)
- Place of birth: Oldham, England
- Height: 1.80 m (5 ft 11 in)
- Position: Midfielder

Youth career
- –2016: Manchester City
- 2016–2018: Newcastle United
- 2018–2020: Burnley

Senior career*
Years	Team	Apps	(Gls)
2020–2021	Burnley	0	(0)
2021	→ Barrow (loan)	2	(0)
2021	Chorley	7	(0)
2021–2022	AFC Telford United	24	(4)
2022	Buxton	4	(1)
Total		37	(5)
- * Club domestic league appearances and goals as of 09:27, 3 December 2023 (UTC)

Mace Lewin Goodridge (born 13 September 1999) is an English former professional footballer who played as a midfielder.

== Career ==
Goodridge played youth football for Manchester City, Newcastle United and Burnley. Goodridge arrived at Burnley from Newcastle United in 2018. He signed a new contract with Burnley in February 2020, which was a reward for the difficult first season he had at the club after initially impressing Academy manager Jon Pepper. He had picked up a cruciate ligament injury from an innocuous challenge in training that had kept him out of action for almost a year. He also spent some time with the first-team, featuring on the bench twice in the 2019–20 season before football was suspended for COVID-19. He moved on loan to Barrow in February 2021. In May 2021 it was announced that Goodridge would be leaving the club after three years, following the expiration of his contract.

In October 2021 he signed for Chorley.

In December 2021 he signed for AFC Telford United.

In July 2022 he signed for Buxton.

He stopped playing football and moved into the management side of the game, where he became the Academy's Head of Performance Analysis at EFL League One side Fleetwood Town.
