= 2021–22 Burnley F.C. season =

English football club season

Burnley
2021–22 season
- Chairman: Alan Pace
- Manager: Sean Dyche (until 15 April); Mike Jackson (caretaker manager, from 15 April)
- Stadium: Turf Moor
- Premier League: 18th (relegated)
- FA Cup: Third round
- EFL Cup: Fourth round
- Top goalscorer: League: Maxwel Cornet (9); All: Maxwel Cornet (9)
- Highest home attendance: League/All: 21,361 (22 May 2022 v Newcastle United, Premier League)
- Lowest home attendance: League: 16,910 (14 August 2021 v Brighton); All: 7,654 (8 January 2022 v Huddersfield Town, FA Cup)
| Home colours | Away colours | Third colours |

The 2021–22 season was Burnley's sixth consecutive season in the Premier League and the 140th year in their history. This season, the club participated in the Premier League, FA Cup and EFL Cup. The season covered the period from 1 July 2021 to 30 June 2022.

Burnley suffered poor form throughout their season and in mid-April, with the club in the relegation zone, manager Sean Dyche was sacked after nearly 10 years in charge. Under-23 manager Mike Jackson was appointed as caretaker, and results did initially pick up - however, a run of one point from the team's last four games, including a last-day 2–1 home defeat to Newcastle United, saw Burnley end the season in 18th position and condemn them to relegation to the EFL Championship for the 2022–23 season.

After the match against Liverpool on 21 August 2021 (2–0 loss), Burnley broke the Premier League record for the most consecutive games without a red card, after having no player sent off in 95 matches. This run ended at 119 games when Nathan Collins received a red card during a match against Brentford on 12 March 2022.

== Transfers ==
=== Transfers in ===
| Date | Position | Nationality | Name | From | Fee | Ref. |
|---|---|---|---|---|---|---|
| 24 June 2021 | CB | (Republic of Ireland) | Nathan Collins | (England) Stoke City | £12,000,000 | |
| 1 July 2021 | CB | (England) | Jacob Bedeau | (England) Scunthorpe United | Free transfer | |
| 1 July 2021 | CM | (England) | Mark Helm | (England) Manchester United | Free transfer | |
| 12 July 2021 | CB | (England) | Harry Williams | (England) West Bromwich Albion | Free transfer | |
| 20 July 2021 | GK | (Wales) | Wayne Hennessey | (England) Crystal Palace | Free transfer | |
| 4 August 2021 | RB | (Wales) | Ethen Vaughan | (England) Norwich City | Free transfer | |
| 25 August 2021 | RW | (England) | Aaron Lennon | (Turkey) Kayserispor | Free transfer | |
| 29 August 2021 | LW | (Ivory Coast) | Maxwel Cornet | (France) Olympique Lyonnais | £12,850,000 | |
| 31 August 2021 | RB | (Wales) | Connor Roberts | (Wales) Swansea City | Undisclosed | |
| 31 January 2022 | CF | (Netherlands) | Wout Weghorst | (Germany) VfL Wolfsburg | £12,000,000 | |

=== Transfers out ===
| Date | Position | Nationality | Name | To | Fee | Ref. |
|---|---|---|---|---|---|---|
| 26 June 2021 | GK | (Germany) | Marc Richter | (Germany) Würzburger Kickers | Undisclosed | |
| 30 June 2021 | RB | (England) | Connor Barrett | (England) Kettering Town | Released | |
| 30 June 2021 | LM | (Republic of Ireland) | Robbie Brady | (England) Bournemouth | Contract Expired | |
| 30 June 2021 | RB | (England) | Jordan Cropper | Free agent | Released | |
| 30 June 2021 | RB | (England) | Marcel Elva-Fountaine | (England) Hayes & Yeading United | Released | |
| 30 June 2021 | CM | (England) | Mace Goodridge | (England) Chorley | Released | |
| 30 June 2021 | CF | (Denmark) | Arman Taranis | (England) Kettering Town | Released | |
| 1 July 2021 | RB | (England) | Ryan Cooney | (England) Morecambe | Free transfer | |
| 1 July 2021 | CB | (England) | Ben Gibson | (England) Norwich City | Undisclosed | |
| 13 July 2021 | CB | (Republic of Ireland) | Jimmy Dunne | (England) Queens Park Rangers | Undisclosed | |
| 29 July 2021 | CM | (England) | Josh Benson | (England) Barnsley | Undisclosed | |
| 13 January 2022 | CF | (New Zealand) | Chris Wood | (England) Newcastle United | £25,000,000 | |

=== Loans out ===
| Date from | Position | Nationality | Name | To | Date until | Ref. |
|---|---|---|---|---|---|---|
| 1 July 2021 | CF | (Sweden) | Joel Mumbongo | (England) Accrington Stanley | End of season | |
| 20 July 2021 | GK | (Denmark) | Lukas Jensen | (England) Carlisle United | End of season | |
| 27 July 2021 | GK | (Northern Ireland) | Bailey Peacock-Farrell | (England) Sheffield Wednesday | End of season | |
| 27 July 2021 | CM | (England) | Adam Phillips | (England) Morecambe | End of season | |
| 31 August 2021 | CB | (England) | Richard Nartey | (England) Mansfield Town | End of season | |
| 4 January 2022 | CB | (England) | Jacob Bedeau | (England) Morecambe | End of season | |
| 7 January 2022 | LB | (England) | Anthony Glennon | (England) Barrow | End of season | |

== Pre-season friendlies ==
| 20 July 2021 Friendly | Burnley | 4–0 | Salford City | Burnley |
| BST | Rodriguez; Brownhill | Report | | Stadium: Barnfield Training Centre; Attendance: 0 (Behind-closed-doors) |

| 20 July 2021 Friendly | Burnley | 2–1 | Morecambe | Burnley |
| BST | Barnes; Guðmundsson | Report | McPake | Stadium: Barnfield Training Centre; Attendance: 0 (Behind-closed-doors) |

| 24 July 2021 Friendly | Oldham Athletic | 0–2 | Burnley | Oldham |
| 13:00 BST | | Report | Rodriguez 55'; Richardson 58' | Stadium: Boundary Park; Attendance: 2,071 |

| 27 July 2021 Friendly | Blackpool | 0–1 | Burnley | Blackpool |
| 19:45 BST | | Report | Thomas 76' | Stadium: Bloomfield Road; Referee: Michael Salisbury |

| 31 July 2021 Friendly | Tranmere Rovers | 1–2 | Burnley | Birkenhead |
| 13:00 BST | Knight-Percival 57' | Report | Barnes 70'; McNeil 87' | Stadium: Prenton Park; Attendance: 0 (Behind-closed-doors); Referee: Rob Jones |

| 31 July 2021 Friendly | Nottingham Forest | Cancelled | Burnley | West Bridgford |
| 15:00 BST | | | | Stadium: City Ground |
Note: Match was cancelled due to a small number of positive COVID-19 test in the Nottingham Forest squad.

| 3 August 2021 Friendly | Burnley | 1–0 | Newcastle United | Burnley |
| BST | Rodriguez | Report | | Stadium: Turf Moor; Attendance: 0 (Behind-closed-doors) |

| 7 August 2021 Friendly | Burnley | 0–2 | Cádiz | Burnley |
| 14:00 BST | | Report | Calderón 45'; Fernández 48' | Stadium: Turf Moor; Referee: Ollie Yates |

| 17 August 2021 Friendly | Manchester United | 3–1 | Burnley | Manchester |
| 14:00 BST | Martial 14'; Lingard 20'; Norris 55' (o.g.) | Report | Lennon 10' | Stadium: Old Trafford |

== Competitions ==
=== Premier League ===
==== League table ====
| Pos | Team | Pld | W | D | L | GF | GA | GD | Pts | Qualification or relegation |
|---|---|---|---|---|---|---|---|---|---|---|
| 16 | Everton | 38 | 11 | 6 | 21 | 43 | 66 | −23 | 39 | |
| 17 | Leeds United | 38 | 9 | 11 | 18 | 42 | 79 | −37 | 38 | |
| 18 | Burnley (R) | 38 | 7 | 14 | 17 | 34 | 53 | −19 | 35 | Relegation to EFL Championship |
| 19 | Watford (R) | 38 | 6 | 5 | 27 | 34 | 77 | −43 | 23 | Relegation to EFL Championship |
| 20 | Norwich City (R) | 38 | 5 | 7 | 26 | 23 | 84 | −61 | 22 | Relegation to EFL Championship |

Source: Premier League
Rules for classification: 1) Points; 2) Goal difference; 3) Goals scored; 4) If the champions, relegated teams or qualified teams for UEFA competitions cannot be determined by rules 1 to 3, rules 4.1 to 4.3 are applied – 4.1) Points gained in head-to-head record between such teams; 4.2) Away goals scored in head-to-head record between such teams; 4.3) Play-offs
(R) Relegated

==== Results summary ====
| Overall | | | | | | | | Home | | | | | | Away | | | | | |
| Pld | W | D | L | GF | GA | GD | Pts | W | D | L | GF | GA | GD | W | D | L | GF | GA | GD |
|---|---|---|---|---|---|---|---|---|---|---|---|---|---|---|---|---|---|---|---|
| 38 | 7 | 14 | 17 | 34 | 53 | −19 | 35 | 5 | 6 | 8 | 18 | 25 | −7 | 2 | 8 | 9 | 16 | 28 | −12 |

==== Results by matchday ====
| Matchday | 1 | 2 | 3 | 4 | 5 | 6 | 7 | 8 | 9 | 10 | 11 | 12 | 13 | 14 | 15 | 16 | 17 | 18 | 20 | 21 | 22 | 23 | 24 | 25 | 26 | 19 | 28 | 29 | 27 | 31 | 32 | 30 | 34 | 35 | 36 | 33 | 37 | 38 |
|---|---|---|---|---|---|---|---|---|---|---|---|---|---|---|---|---|---|---|---|---|---|---|---|---|---|---|---|---|---|---|---|---|---|---|---|---|---|---|
| Ground | A | H | H | A | H | A | H | A | A | H | A | H | H | A | A | H | H | A | A | A | H | A | H | A | H | H | H | A | A | H | A | H | H | A | H | A | A | H |
| Result | L | L | D | L | L | D | D | L | D | W | D | D | D | L | D | L | L | D | D | D | L | W | W | D | L | L | L | L | W | L | D | W | W | W | L | L | D | L |
| Position | 12 | 17 | 16 | 18 | 19 | 19 | 18 | 18 | 18 | 18 | 18 | 18 | 17 | 17 | 17 | 17 | 17 | 16 | 16 | 16 | 16 | 17 | 17 | 17 | 18 | 16 | 16 | 17 | 18 | 18 | 18 | 18 | 17 | 16 | 17 | 17 | 17 | 18 |

Source: Premier League
W = Win; D = Draw; L = Loss

==== Matches ====
| 14 August 2021 1 | Burnley | 1–2 | Brighton & Hove Albion | Burnley |
| 15:00 BST | Tarkowski 2', (yellow card) 13'; Guðmundsson (yellow card) 9' | Report | Maupay (yellow card) 26', (goal) 73'; Mac Allister 78' | Stadium: Turf Moor; Attendance: 16,910; Referee: David Coote |

| 21 August 2021 2 | Liverpool | 2–0 | Burnley | Liverpool |
| 12:30 BST | Jota 18'; Mané 69' | Report | | Stadium: Anfield; Attendance: 52,591; Referee: Mike Dean |
Note: Live on BT Sport

| 29 August 2021 3 | Burnley | 1–1 | Leeds United | Burnley |
| 14:00 BST | Brownhill (yellow card) 20'; Barnes (yellow card) 28'; Mee (yellow card) 45+1'; Wood 61'; Lennon (yellow card) 90' | Report | Phillips (yellow card) 38'; Rodrigo (yellow card) 53'; Struijk (yellow card) 81'; Bamford 86' | Stadium: Turf Moor; Attendance: 18,655; Referee: Michael Oliver |
Note: Live on Sky Sports

| 13 September 2021 4 | Everton | 3–1 | Burnley | Liverpool |
| 20:00 BST | Townsend (yellow card) 53', (goal) 65'; Keane 60'; Gray 66' | Report | Brownhill (yellow card) 47'; Mee 53' | Stadium: Goodison Park; Attendance: 38,354; Referee: Martin Atkinson |

| 18 September 2021 5 | Burnley | 0–1 | Arsenal | Burnley |
| 15:00 BST | Barnes (yellow card) 19'; Westwood (yellow card) 29' | Report | Ødegaard 30'; Tavares (yellow card) 90+2' | Stadium: Turf Moor; Attendance: 18,821; Referee: Anthony Taylor |

| 25 September 2021 6 | Leicester City | 2–2 | Burnley | Leicester |
| 15:00 BST | Vestergaard (yellow card) 5'; Vardy 37', 85'; Barnes (yellow card) 77' | Report | Vardy 12' (o.g.); Cornet 40', (yellow card) 45+1'; Westwood (yellow card) 60'; Guðmundsson (yellow card) 69'; Tarkowski (yellow card) 90' | Stadium: King Power Stadium; Attendance: 31,650; Referee: Chris Kavanagh |

| 2 October 2021 7 | Burnley | 0–0 | Norwich City | Burnley |
| 15:00 BST | Tarkowski (yellow card) 11'; Wood (yellow card) 24'; Lowton (yellow card) 25'; Brownhill (yellow card) 33'; Rodriguez (yellow card) 49' | Report | Normann (yellow card) 27'; Aarons (yellow card) 74' | Stadium: Turf Moor; Attendance: 17,427; Referee: Kevin Friend |

| 16 October 2021 8 | Manchester City | 2–0 | Burnley | Manchester |
| 15:00 BST | Silva 12'; Laporte (yellow card) 45+3'; De Bruyne 70' | Report | | Stadium: Etihad Stadium; Attendance: 52,711; Referee: Martin Atkinson |

| 23 October 2021 9 | Southampton | 2–2 | Burnley | Southampton |
| 15:00 BST | Livramento 41'; Broja 50'; Elyounoussi (yellow card) 81' | Report | Cornet 13', 57'; Cork (yellow card) 42'; Rodriguez (yellow card) 70'; Westwood (yellow card) 72' | Stadium: St Mary's Stadium; Attendance: 29,145; Referee: Chris Kavanagh |

| 30 October 2021 10 | Burnley | 3–1 | Brentford | Burnley |
| 15:00 BST | Wood 4'; Lowton 32'; Cornet 36'; McNeil (yellow card) 83' | Report | Ghoddos (yellow card) 72', (goal) 79' | Stadium: Turf Moor; Attendance: 18,181; Referee: Jonathan Moss |

| 6 November 2021 11 | Chelsea | 1–1 | Burnley | Fulham |
| 15:00 GMT | Havertz 33'; James (yellow card) 76' | Report | Westwood (yellow card) 68'; Cornet (yellow card) 76'; Vydra 80'; Tarkowski (yellow card) 84'; Brownhill (yellow card) 90' | Stadium: Stamford Bridge; Attendance: 39,798; Referee: Andre Marriner |

| 20 November 2021 12 | Burnley | 3–3 | Crystal Palace | Burnley |
| 15:00 GMT | Mee 19'; Tarkowski (yellow card) 22'; Wood 27'; Cornet 49'; Westwood (yellow card) 70' | Report | Benteke 8', 36', (yellow card) 59'; Zaha (yellow card) 22'; Guéhi 42'; Olise (yellow card) 90+1' | Stadium: Turf Moor; Attendance: 18,028; Referee: Simon Hooper |

| 1 December 2021 14 | Wolverhampton Wanderers | 0–0 | Burnley | Wolverhampton |
| 19:30 GMT | Hwang Hee-chan (yellow card) 18'; Kilman (yellow card) 86' | Report | Mee (yellow card) 7'; Lowton (yellow card) 18'; Rodriguez (yellow card) 64' | Stadium: Molineux; Attendance: 30,328; Referee: John Brooks |

| 4 December 2021 15 | Newcastle United | 1–0 | Burnley | Newcastle upon Tyne |
| 15:00 GMT | Wilson 40'; Manquillo (yellow card) 87' | Report | Collins (yellow card) 75' | Stadium: St James' Park; Attendance: 51,948; Referee: Paul Tierney |

| 12 December 2021 16 | Burnley | 0–0 | West Ham United | Burnley |
| 14:00 GMT | Taylor (yellow card) 33'; Mee (yellow card) 45+3' | Report | Dawson (yellow card) 90+3' | Stadium: Turf Moor; Attendance: 18,065; Referee: Graham Scott |

| 30 December 2021 20 | Manchester United | 3–1 | Burnley | Manchester |
| 20:15 GMT | McTominay 8'; Mee 27' (o.g.); Ronaldo 35' | Report | Lennon 38' | Stadium: Old Trafford; Attendance: 73,121; Referee: Jonathan Moss |

| 2 January 2022 21 | Leeds United | 3–1 | Burnley | Leeds |
| 14:00 GMT | Roberts (yellow card) 10'; Harrison 39'; Llorente (yellow card) 53'; Dallas 77'; James 90+2' | Report | Tarkowski (yellow card) 28'; Cornet 54' | Stadium: Elland Road; Attendance: 36,083; Referee: Paul Tierney |

| 23 January 2022 23 | Arsenal | 0–0 | Burnley | Holloway |
| 14:00 GMT | | Report | Westwood (yellow card) 25'; Brownhill (yellow card) 30' | Stadium: Emirates Stadium; Attendance: 59,255; Referee: David Coote |

| 5 February 2022 17 | Burnley | 0–0 | Watford | Burnley |
| 18:00 GMT | Stephens (yellow card) 45' | Report | King (yellow card) 20'; Cleverley (yellow card) 90+1' | Stadium: Turf Moor; Attendance: 19,527; Referee: Craig Pawson |
Note: The match was postponed due to a COVID-19 outbreak on Watford's squad. It was rescheduled to 5 February 2022.

| 8 February 2022 24 | Burnley | 1–1 | Manchester United | Burnley |
| 20:00 GMT | Rodriguez 48'; Pieters (yellow card) 74'; Brownhill (yellow card) 77' | Report | Pogba 18'; Maguire (yellow card) 63' | Stadium: Turf Moor; Attendance: 21,233; Referee: Mike Dean |

| 13 February 2022 25 | Burnley | 0–1 | Liverpool | Burnley |
| 14:00 GMT | | Report | Henderson (yellow card) 26'; Fabinho 40' | Stadium: Turf Moor; Attendance: 21,239; Referee: Martin Atkinson |

| 19 February 2022 26 | Brighton & Hove Albion | 0–3 | Burnley | Falmer |
| 15:00 GMT | Duffy (yellow card) 84' | Report | Weghorst 21'; Cork (yellow card) 25'; Brownhill 40', (yellow card) 87'; Roberts (yellow card) 59'; Lennon (yellow card) 61', (goal) 69' | Stadium: Falmer Stadium; Attendance: 30,781; Referee: Kevin Friend |

| 23 February 2022 13 | Burnley | 1–0 | Tottenham Hotspur | Burnley |
| 19:30 GMT | Mee 71' | Report | | Stadium: Turf Moor; Attendance: 19,488; Referee: Peter Bankes |
Note: The match, originally scheduled for 28 November 2021, was postponed due to snow.

| 26 February 2022 27 | Crystal Palace | 1–1 | Burnley | Selhurst |
| 15:00 GMT | Schlupp 9' | Report | Brownhill (yellow card) 30'; Milivojević 46' (o.g.); Tarkowski (yellow card) 72' | Stadium: Selhurst Park; Attendance: 24,203; Referee: Jonathan Moss |

| 1 March 2022 22 | Burnley | 0–2 | Leicester City | Burnley |
| 19:45 GMT | Weghorst (yellow card) 57' | Report | Maddison 82'; Vardy 90'; Dewsbury-Hall (yellow card) 90+1' | Stadium: Turf Moor; Attendance: 17,825; Referee: Chris Kavanagh |
Note: The match, originally scheduled for 15 January 2022, was postponed due to a COVID-19 outbreak in Burnley's squad.

| 5 March 2022 28 | Burnley | 0–4 | Chelsea | Burnley |
| 15:00 GMT | Barnes (yellow card) 84'; Westwood (yellow card) 89' | Report | James 47'; Havertz 52', 55'; Pulisic 69' | Stadium: Turf Moor; Attendance: 19,439; Referee: Andre Marriner |

| 12 March 2022 29 | Brentford | 2–0 | Burnley | Brentford |
| 15:00 GMT | Toney 85', 90+4' (pen.), (yellow card) 86' | Report | Tarkowski (yellow card) 89'; Collins (red card) 90+2' | Stadium: Brentford Community Stadium; Attendance: 16,984; Referee: Paul Tierney |

| 2 April 2022 31 | Burnley | 0–2 | Manchester City | Burnley |
| 15:00 BST | Weghorst (yellow card) 13' | Report | De Bruyne 5'; Gündoğan 25' | Stadium: Turf Moor; Attendance: 20,388; Referee: Craig Pawson |

| 6 April 2022 19 | Burnley | 3–2 | Everton | Burnley |
| 19:30 BST | Brownhill (yellow card) 10'; Collins 12'; Rodriguez 57'; Lowton (yellow card) 76'; Cornet 85' | Report | Holgate (yellow card) 3'; Richarlison 18' (pen.), 41' (pen.); Godfrey (yellow card) 54' | Stadium: Turf Moor; Attendance: 19,830; Referee: Mike Dean |
Note: The match was postponed due to a COVID-19 outbreak in Everton's squad and rescheduled to 6 April 2022.

| 10 April 2022 32 | Norwich City | 2–0 | Burnley | Norwich |
| 14:00 BST | Lees-Melou 9', (yellow card) 25'; Pukki 86' | Report | Taylor (yellow card) 78' | Stadium: Carrow Road; Attendance: 26,361; Referee: Michael Oliver |

| 17 April 2022 33 | West Ham United | 1–1 | Burnley | Stratford |
| 14:15 BST | Fabiański (yellow card) 45'; Rice (yellow card) 67'; Souček 74' | Report | Cork (yellow card) 11'; Weghorst 33', (yellow card) 67'; Cornet (penalty missed) 45+1 | Stadium: London Stadium; Attendance: 59,958; Referee: Paul Tierney |

| 21 April 2022 30 | Burnley | 2–0 | Southampton | Burnley |
| 19:45 BST | Roberts 12'; Cork (yellow card) 38'; Collins 44'; Tarkowski (yellow card) 73' | Report | Bednarek (yellow card) 73'; Perraud (yellow card) 79' | Stadium: Turf Moor; Attendance: 17,384; Referee: Stuart Attwell |

| 24 April 2022 34 | Burnley | 1–0 | Wolverhampton Wanderers | Burnley |
| 14:00 BST | Vydra (yellow card) 33', (goal) 62'; Taylor (yellow card) 77'; Barnes (yellow card) 90+4' | Report | Neto (yellow card) 90+4' | Stadium: Turf Moor; Attendance: 19,246; Referee: Anthony Taylor |

| 30 April 2022 35 | Watford | 1–2 | Burnley | Watford |
| 15:00 BST | Tarkowski 8' (o.g.); Kucka (yellow card) 87' | Report | Tarkowski (yellow card) 48'; Cork 83'; Brownhill 86'; Collins (yellow card) 90+1' | Stadium: Vicarage Road; Attendance: 20,738; Referee: Craig Pawson |

| 7 May 2022 36 | Burnley | 1–3 | Aston Villa | Burnley |
| 15:00 BST | Brownhill (yellow card) 69'; Cornet 90+1' | Report | Ings 7'; Digne (yellow card) 21'; Buendía 31'; Watkins (yellow card) 45+1', (goal) 52' | Stadium: Turf Moor; Attendance: 20,891; Referee: David Coote |

| 15 May 2022 37 | Tottenham Hotspur | 1–0 | Burnley | Tottenham |
| 12:00 BST | Kane 45+8' (pen.); Moura (yellow card) 49'; Lloris (yellow card) 86'; Kulusevski (yellow card) 90+4' | Report | Roberts (yellow card) 27'; Pope (yellow card) 45+8' | Stadium: Tottenham Hotspur Stadium; Attendance: 61,729; Referee: Kevin Friend |

| 19 May 2022 18 | Aston Villa | 1–1 | Burnley | Aston |
| 20:00 BST | Buendía 48' | Report | Barnes 45' (pen.); Long (yellow card) 55'; Lowton (red card) 90+1' | Stadium: Villa Park; Attendance: 40,468; Referee: Paul Tierney |
Note: The match was originally scheduled to 18 December 2021 but was postponed due to a COVID-19 outbreak in Aston Villa's squad and was rescheduled to 19 May 2022.

| 22 May 2022 38 | Burnley | 1–2 | Newcastle United | Burnley |
| 16:00 BST | Tarkowski (yellow card) 65'; Cornet 69' | Report | Wilson 20' (pen.), 60' | Stadium: Turf Moor; Attendance: 21,361; Referee: Craig Pawson |

=== FA Cup ===
| 8 January 2022 Third round | Burnley | 1–2 | Huddersfield Town | Burnley |
| 12:30 GMT | Rodriguez 28' | Report | Koroma 74'; Pearson 87' | Stadium: Turf Moor; Attendance: 7,654; Referee: Andre Marriner |

=== EFL Cup ===
| 25 August 2021 Second round | Newcastle United | 0–0 (3–4 p) | Burnley | Newcastle upon Tyne |
| 19:45 BST | | Report | Collins (yellow card) 79'; McNeil (yellow card) 80' | Stadium: St James' Park; Attendance: 30,082; Referee: Oliver Langford |
| | Penalties |
| | Saint-Maximin (penalty missed); Willock (penalty scored); Joelinton (penalty scored); S. Longstaff (penalty scored); Almirón (penalty missed) | | (penalty scored) Wood; (penalty scored) Barnes; (penalty scored) McNeil; (penalty missed) Brownhill; (penalty scored) Taylor |

| 21 September 2021 Third round | Burnley | 4–1 | Rochdale | Burnley |
| 19:45 BST | Rodriguez 50', 60', 62', 76'; Tarkowski (yellow card) 63' | Report | Beesley 47'; O'Keeffe (yellow card) 63'; O'Connell (yellow card) 64' | Stadium: Turf Moor; Attendance: 9,125; Referee: Geoff Eltringham |

| 27 October 2021 Fourth round | Burnley | 0–1 | Tottenham Hotspur | Burnley |
| 19:45 BST | Roberts (yellow card) 70' | Report | Lucas 68'; Son (yellow card) 90+4' | Stadium: Turf Moor; Attendance: 14,637; Referee: Peter Bankes |

== Appearances and goals ==
Numbers in parentheses denote appearances as substitute.
Players with names struck through and marked † left the club during the playing season.
Players with names in italics and marked * were on loan from another club for the whole of their season with Burnley.
Players listed with no appearances have been in the matchday squad but only as unused substitutes.
Key to positions: GK – Goalkeeper; DF – Defender; MF – Midfielder; FW – Forward

Players contracted for the 2021–22 season
| No. | Pos. | Nat. | Name | League | | FA Cup | | EFL Cup | | Total | | Discipline | |
| No. | Pos. | Nat. | Name | Apps | Goals | Apps | Goals | Apps | Goals | Apps | Goals | A yellow rectangle, denoting the yellow penalty card shown to a player being cautioned | A red rectangle, denoting the red penalty card shown to a player being sent off |
|---|---|---|---|---|---|---|---|---|---|---|---|---|---|
| 1 | GK | ENG | Nick Pope | 36 | 0 | 1 | 0 | 2 | 0 | 39 | 0 | 1 | 0 |
| 2 | DF | ENG | Matthew Lowton | 20 (5) | 1 | 1 | 0 | 0 (1) | 0 | 21 (6) | 1 | 3 | 1 |
| 3 | DF | ENG | Charlie Taylor | 30 (1) | 0 | 0 | 0 | 0 (1) | 0 | 30 (2) | 0 | 3 | 0 |
| 4 | MF | ENG | Jack Cork | 20 | 1 | 0 (1) | 0 | 3 | 0 | 23 (1) | 1 | 4 | 0 |
| 5 | DF | ENG | James Tarkowski | 35 | 1 | 1 | 0 | 1 | 0 | 37 | 1 | 12 | 0 |
| 6 | DF | ENG | Ben Mee | 21 | 3 | 1 | 0 | 2 | 0 | 24 | 3 | 3 | 0 |
| 7 | MF | ISL | Jóhann Berg Guðmundsson | 13 (5) | 0 | 0 | 0 | 1 | 0 | 14 (5) | 0 | 2 | 0 |
| 8 | MF | ENG | Josh Brownhill | 32 (3) | 2 | 1 | 0 | 2 | 0 | 35 (3) | 2 | 10 | 0 |
| 9 | FW | NZL | ~~Chris Wood~~ † | 17 | 3 | 1 | 0 | 1 (2) | 0 | 19 (2) | 3 | 1 | 0 |
| 9 | FW | NED | Wout Weghorst | 17 (3) | 2 | 0 | 0 | 0 | 0 | 17 (3) | 2 | 3 | 0 |
| 10 | FW | ENG | Ashley Barnes | 8 (15) | 1 | 0 | 0 | 0 (2) | 0 | 8 (17) | 1 | 4 | 0 |
| 11 | MF | ENG | Dwight McNeil | 35 (3) | 0 | 0 | 0 | 2 | 0 | 37 (3) | 0 | 2 | 0 |
| 13 | GK | WAL | Wayne Hennessey | 2 | 0 | 0 | 0 | 1 | 0 | 3 | 0 | 0 | 0 |
| 14 | DF | WAL | Connor Roberts | 19 (2) | 1 | 0 | 0 | 1 | 0 | 20 (2) | 1 | 3 | 0 |
| 16 | MF | ENG | Dale Stephens | 1 (2) | 0 | 1 | 0 | 0 | 0 | 2 (2) | 0 | 1 | 0 |
| 17 | MF | ENG | Aaron Lennon | 17 (11) | 2 | 1 | 0 | 2 (1) | 0 | 20 (12) | 2 | 2 | 0 |
| 18 | MF | ENG | Ashley Westwood | 26 (1) | 0 | 1 | 0 | 1 | 0 | 28 (1) | 0 | 7 | 0 |
| 19 | FW | ENG | Jay Rodriguez | 13 (16) | 2 | 1 | 1 | 3 | 4 | 17 (16) | 7 | 3 | 0 |
| 20 | FW | CIV | Maxwel Cornet | 21 (5) | 9 | 0 | 0 | 1 (1) | 0 | 22 (6) | 9 | 2 | 0 |
| 22 | DF | IRL | Nathan Collins | 18 (1) | 2 | 0 | 0 | 3 | 0 | 21 (1) | 2 | 3 | 1 |
| 23 | DF | NED | Erik Pieters | 8 (4) | 0 | 0 | 0 | 3 | 0 | 11 (4) | 0 | 1 | 0 |
| 25 | GK | ENG | Will Norris | 0 | 0 | 0 | 0 | 0 | 0 | 0 | 0 | 0 | 0 |
| 26 | DF | SCO | Phil Bardsley | 0 | 0 | 1 | 0 | 2 | 0 | 3 | 0 | 0 | 0 |
| 27 | FW | CZE | Matěj Vydra | 5 (17) | 2 | 0 | 0 | 2 | 0 | 7 (17) | 2 | 1 | 0 |
| 28 | DF | IRL | Kevin Long | 4 (2) | 0 | 0 | 0 | 0 | 0 | 4 (2) | 0 | 1 | 0 |
| 35 | MF | FRA | Anthony Gomez Mancini | 0 | 0 | 0 | 0 | 0 | 0 | 0 | 0 | 0 | 0 |
| 37 | DF | ENG | Bobby Thomas | 0 | 0 | 0 | 0 | 0 | 0 | 0 | 0 | 0 | 0 |
| 38 | FW | ENG | Lewis Richardson | 0 | 0 | 0 | 0 | 0 | 0 | 0 | 0 | 0 | 0 |
| 39 | DF | ENG | Owen Dodgson | 0 | 0 | 0 (1) | 0 | 0 | 0 | 0 (1) | 0 | 0 | 0 |
| 44 | FW | IRL | Dara Costelloe | 0 | 0 | 0 | 0 | 0 | 0 | 0 | 0 | 0 | 0 |
| 49 | FW | SCO | Joe McGlynn | 0 | 0 | 0 | 0 | 0 | 0 | 0 | 0 | 0 | 0 |
| 50 | GK | ENG | Sam Waller | 0 | 0 | 0 | 0 | 0 | 0 | 0 | 0 | 0 | 0 |
| 55 | MF | ENG | Mark Helm | 0 | 0 | 0 | 0 | 0 | 0 | 0 | 0 | 0 | 0 |

== See also ==
- 2021–22 in English football
- List of Burnley F.C. seasons
