= 2020–21 Burnley F.C. season =

English football club season

Burnley
2020–21 season
- Chairman: Mike Garlick (until December 2020); Alan Pace (from December 2020)
- Head coach: Sean Dyche
- Stadium: Turf Moor
- Premier League: 17th
- FA Cup: Fifth round
- EFL Cup: Fourth round
- Top goalscorer: League: Chris Wood (12); All: Chris Wood (12)
| Home colours | Away colours | Third colours |

The 2020–21 season was Burnley's 139th competitive season, their 58th in the top flight of English football, and their fifth consecutive in the Premier League. Along with the Premier League, the club competed in the FA Cup and EFL Cup. The season covered the period from August 2020 to 30 June 2021.

== Transfers ==
=== Transfers in ===
| Date | Position | Nationality | Name | From | Fee | Ref. |
|---|---|---|---|---|---|---|
| 14 August 2020 | GK | (England) | Will Norris | (England) Wolverhampton Wanderers | Undisclosed | |
| 17 August 2020 | LB | (Northern Ireland) | Dane McCullough | (Northern Ireland) Portadown | Undisclosed | |
| 18 August 2020 | CB | (England) | Jack Leckie | (England) Newcastle United | Undisclosed | |
| 18 August 2020 | CB | (England) | Dan Sassi | (England) Stoke City | Free transfer | |
| 18 August 2020 | RB | (Wales) | Keelan Williams | (England) Liverpool | Free transfer | |
| 20 August 2020 | RB | (England) | Connor Barrett | (England) Leicester City | Free transfer | |
| 20 August 2020 | RB | (England) | Marcel Elva-Fountaine | (England) Reading | Free transfer | |
| 20 August 2020 | GK | (Germany) | Marc Richter | (Germany) Augsburg | Free transfer | |
| 20 August 2020 | AM | (Wales) | Will Rickard | (Wales) Swansea City | Free transfer | |
| 8 September 2020 | CM | (England) | Ismaila Diallo | (England) Arsenal | Free transfer | |
| 24 September 2020 | CM | (England) | Dale Stephens | (England) Brighton & Hove Albion | Undisclosed | |
| 20 November 2020 | LB | (England) | Owen Dodgson | (England) Manchester United | Undisclosed | |
| 20 November 2020 | CB | (England) | Calen Gallagher-Allison | (England) Manchester United | Undisclosed | |
| 20 November 2020 | CF | (Denmark) | Arman Taranis | (Denmark) SønderjyskE | Free transfer | |

=== Loans in ===
| Date from | Position | Nationality | Name | From | Date until | Ref. |
|---|---|---|---|---|---|---|
| 5 October 2020 | AM | (France) | Anthony Gomez Mancini | (France) Angers | End of season | |

=== Loans out ===
| Date from | Position | Nationality | Name | To | Date until | Ref. |
|---|---|---|---|---|---|---|
| 11 August 2020 | RB | (England) | Ryan Cooney | (England) Morecambe | End of season | |
| 12 August 2020 | AM | (England) | Adam Phillips | (England) Morecambe | 1 February 2021 | |
| 20 August 2020 | RB | (England) | Jordan Cropper | (England) Chesterfield | End of season | |
| 4 September 2020 | CB | (England) | Ben Gibson | (England) Norwich City | End of season | |
| 22 January 2021 | CB | (England) | Bobby Thomas | (England) Barrow | End of season | |
| 1 February 2021 | GK | (Denmark) | Lukas Jensen | (England) Bolton Wanderers | End of season | |
| 1 February 2021 | AM | (England) | Adam Phillips | (England) Accrington Stanley | End of season | |
| 2 February 2021 | CM | (England) | Mace Goodridge | (England) Barrow | End of season | |
| 14 May 2021 | GK | (Denmark) | Lukas Jensen | (Iceland) Kórdrengir | 14 July 2021 | |

=== Transfers out ===
| Date | Position | Nationality | Name | To | Fee | Ref. |
|---|---|---|---|---|---|---|
| 1 July 2020 | RM | (England) | Olatunde Bayode | Unattached | Released | |
| 1 July 2020 | DF | (England) | Udoka Chima | Unattached | Released | |
| 1 July 2020 | CF | (England) | Will Harris | (England) Sunderland | Released | |
| 1 July 2020 | GK | (England) | Joe Hart | (England) Tottenham Hotspur | Released | |
| 1 July 2020 | CM | (Republic of Ireland) | Jeff Hendrick | (England) Newcastle United | Rejected contract | |
| 1 July 2020 | LB | (England) | Ali Koiki | (England) Bristol Rovers | Rejected contract | |
| 1 July 2020 | GK | (England) | Adam Legzdins | (Scotland) Dundee | Released | |
| 1 July 2020 | RW | (England) | Aaron Lennon | (Turkey) Kayserispor | Released | |
| 1 July 2020 | FW | (England) | Jaydon Major | Unattached | Released | |
| 1 July 2020 | CM | (England) | Christian N'Guessan | Unattached | Released | |
| 1 July 2020 | CF | (England) | Henri Ogunby | Unattached | Released | |
| 1 July 2020 | RB | (England) | Joel Senior | (England) Altrincham | Released | |
| 31 July 2020 | GK | (Australia) | Kai Calderbank-Park | Unattached | Released | |
| 31 July 2020 | GK | (Republic of Ireland) | George McMahon | Unattached | Released | |
| 31 July 2020 | LW | (England) | Vinnie Steels | (England) Sunderland | Released | |
| 4 September 2020 | CB | (England) | Scott Wilson | (England) Barrow | Free transfer | |
| 9 September 2020 | CM | (Australia) | Aiden O'Neill | (Australia) Melbourne City | Free transfer | |
| 16 September 2020 | CB | (England) | Ollie Younger | (England) Sunderland | Free transfer | |
| 24 September 2020 | MF | (England) | Rhys Fenlon | (England) Accrington Stanley | Free transfer | |
| 2 February 2021 | RM | (Northern Ireland) | Chris Conn-Clarke | (England) Fleetwood Town | Undisclosed | |

== Pre-season and friendlies ==
Win Draw Loss Fixtures

| 1 September 2020 Friendly | Preston North End | 0–0 | Burnley | Preston |
| 14:00 BST | | Report | | Stadium: Deepdale; Attendance: 0 Referee: Jeremy Simpson |

| 5 September 2020 Friendly | Burnley | 4–1 | (Scotland) Heart of Midlothian | Barnfield Training Centre |
| 15:00 BST | Rodriguez 5' (pen.); Richardson 18'; Thompson 30'; Guðmundsson 47' | Report | Wighton 37' | Attendance: 0 |

| 11 September 2020 Friendly | Burnley | 3–0 | (Portugal) Marítimo | Burnley |
| 15:00 BST | McNeil 16'; Wood 65'; Vydra 70' | Report | | Attendance: 0 Referee: Peter Bankes |

== Competitions ==
=== Premier League ===
==== League table ====
| Pos | Team | Pld | W | D | L | GF | GA | GD | Pts | Qualification or relegation |
|---|---|---|---|---|---|---|---|---|---|---|
| 15 | Southampton | 38 | 12 | 7 | 19 | 47 | 68 | −21 | 43 | |
| 16 | Brighton & Hove Albion | 38 | 9 | 14 | 15 | 40 | 46 | −6 | 41 | |
| 17 | Burnley | 38 | 10 | 9 | 19 | 33 | 55 | −22 | 39 | |
| 18 | Fulham (R) | 38 | 5 | 13 | 20 | 27 | 53 | −26 | 28 | Relegation to EFL Championship |
| 19 | West Bromwich Albion (R) | 38 | 5 | 11 | 22 | 35 | 76 | −41 | 26 | Relegation to EFL Championship |

Source: Premier League
Rules for classification: 1) Points; 2) Goal difference; 3) Goals scored; 4) If the champions, relegated teams or qualified teams for UEFA competitions cannot be determined by rules 1 to 3, rules 4.1 to 4.3 are applied – 4.1) Points gained in head-to-head record between such teams; 4.2) Away goals scored in head-to-head record between such teams; 4.3) Play-offs
(R) Relegated

==== Results summary ====
| Overall | | | | | | | | Home | | | | | | Away | | | | | |
| Pld | W | D | L | GF | GA | GD | Pts | W | D | L | GF | GA | GD | W | D | L | GF | GA | GD |
|---|---|---|---|---|---|---|---|---|---|---|---|---|---|---|---|---|---|---|---|
| 38 | 10 | 9 | 19 | 33 | 55 | −22 | 39 | 4 | 6 | 9 | 14 | 27 | −13 | 6 | 3 | 10 | 19 | 28 | −9 |

Last updated: 23 May 2021.

==== Results by matchday ====
| Matchday | 1 | 2 | 3 | 4 | 5 | 6 | 7 | 8 | 9 | 10 | 11 | 12 | 13 | 14 | 15 | 16 | 17 | 18 | 19 | 20 | 21 | 22 | 23 | 24 | 25 | 26 | 27 | 28 | 29 | 30 | 31 | 32 | 33 | 34 | 35 | 36 | 37 | 38 |
|---|---|---|---|---|---|---|---|---|---|---|---|---|---|---|---|---|---|---|---|---|---|---|---|---|---|---|---|---|---|---|---|---|---|---|---|---|---|---|
| Ground | A | H | A | A | H | H | A | H | A | H | A | A | H | A | H | H | H | A | A | H | A | H | H | A | H | A | H | H | A | A | H | A | A | H | A | H | H | A |
| Result | L | L | L | D | L | L | D | W | L | D | W | D | W | L | W | D | L | L | W | W | L | L | D | W | D | L | D | D | W | L | L | L | W | L | W | L | L | L |
| Position | 14 | 19 | 20 | 18 | 18 | 20 | 19 | 17 | 19 | 18 | 17 | 17 | 16 | 17 | 16 | 16 | 16 | 17 | 16 | 15 | 16 | 17 | 17 | 15 | 15 | 15 | 15 | 15 | 15 | 15 | 16 | 17 | 14 | 16 | 14 | 15 | 17 | 17 |

Updated to match(es) played on 23 May 2021. Source:
A = Away; H = Home; W = Win; D = Draw; L = Loss

==== Matches ====
The 2020–21 season fixtures were released on 20 August.

| 20 September 2020 1 | Leicester City | 4–2 | Burnley | Leicester |
| 19:00 BST | Barnes 20'; Mendy (yellow card) 25'; Pieters 50' (o.g.); Justin 61'; Praet 79' | Report | Rodriguez (yellow card) 8'; Wood 10'; Dunne 73'; Bardsley (yellow card) 90+1' | Stadium: King Power Stadium; Attendance: 0 Referee: Lee Mason |

| 26 September 2020 2 | Burnley | 0–1 | Southampton | Burnley |
| 20:00 BST | Bardsley (yellow card) 48' | Report | Ings 5' | Stadium: Turf Moor; Attendance: 0 Referee: Andre Marriner |

| 3 October 2020 3 | Newcastle United | 3–1 | Burnley | Newcastle upon Tyne |
| 20:00 BST | Saint-Maximin 14'; Joelinton (yellow card) 36'; Lewis (yellow card) 49'; Wilson 65', 77' (pen.) | Report | Tarkowski (yellow card) 37'; Barnes (yellow card) 40'; Westwood 61'; McNeil (yellow card) 69' | Stadium: St James' Park; Attendance: 0 Referee: David Coote |

| 19 October 2020 4 | West Bromwich Albion | 0–0 | Burnley | West Bromwich |
| 17:30 BST | Livermore (yellow card) 53'; Phillips (yellow card) 90+2' | Report | Taylor (yellow card) 37'; Westwood (yellow card) 77' | Stadium: The Hawthorns; Attendance: 0 Referee: Anthony Taylor |

| 26 October 2020 5 | Burnley | 0–1 | Tottenham Hotspur | Burnley |
| 20:00 GMT | Brownhill (yellow card) 2'; Long (yellow card) 80' | Report | Son Heung-min 76' | Stadium: Turf Moor; Attendance: 0 Referee: Michael Oliver |

| 31 October 2020 6 | Burnley | 0–3 | Chelsea | Burnley |
| 15:00 GMT | Long (yellow card) 49' | Report | Ziyech 26'; Zouma 63'; Werner 70' | Stadium: Turf Moor; Attendance: 0 Referee: David Coote |

| 6 November 2020 7 | Brighton & Hove Albion | 0–0 | Burnley | Falmer |
| 17:30 GMT | Bissouma (yellow card) 87' | Report | | Stadium: Falmer Stadium; Attendance: 0 Referee: Mike Dean |

| 23 November 2020 8 | Burnley | 1–0 | Crystal Palace | Burnley |
| 17:30 GMT | Wood 8'; Rodriguez (yellow card) 79'; Lowton (yellow card) 86' | Report | | Stadium: Turf Moor; Attendance: 0 Referee: Kevin Friend |

| 28 November 2020 9 | Manchester City | 5–0 | Burnley | Manchester |
| 15:00 GMT | Mahrez 6', 22', 69'; Mendy 41'; Torres 66' | Report | | Stadium: City of Manchester Stadium; Attendance: 0 Referee: Lee Mason |

| 5 December 2020 10 | Burnley | 1–1 | Everton | Burnley |
| 12:30 GMT | Brady 3' | Report | Calvert-Lewin 45+3' | Stadium: Turf Moor; Attendance: 0 Referee: Anthony Taylor |

| 13 December 2020 11 | Arsenal | 0–1 | Burnley | Holloway |
| 19:15 GMT | Xhaka (red card) 58'; Bellerín (yellow card) 71'; Elneny (yellow card) 73' | Report | Brady (yellow card) 33'; Aubameyang 73' (o.g.) | Stadium: Emirates Stadium; Attendance: 2,000; Referee: Graham Scott |

| 17 December 2020 12 | Aston Villa | 0–0 | Burnley | Aston, Birmingham |
| 18:00 GMT | Watkins (yellow card) 85' | Report | Brady (yellow card) 32' | Stadium: Villa Park; Attendance: 0 Referee: Craig Pawson |

| 21 December 2020 13 | Burnley | 2–1 | Wolverhampton Wanderers | Burnley |
| 17:30 GMT | Barnes 35'; Westwood (yellow card) 37'; Wood 51'; Rodriguez (yellow card) 90+4' | Report | Otasowie (yellow card) 45+1'; Silva 89' (pen.) | Stadium: Turf Moor; Attendance: 0 Referee: Lee Mason |

| 27 December 2020 14 | Leeds United | 1–0 | Burnley | Beeston, Leeds |
| 12:00 GMT | Bamford 5' (pen.) | Report | Tarkowski (yellow card) 28'; Westwood (yellow card) 79'; Barnes (yellow card) 90' | Stadium: Elland Road; Attendance: 0 Referee: Robert Jones |

| 29 December 2020 15 | Burnley | 1–0 | Sheffield United | Burnley |
| 18:00 GMT | Mee 32'; Lowton (yellow card) 45+2' | Report | Stevens (yellow card) 72'; Burke (yellow card) 90+1' | Stadium: Turf Moor; Attendance: 0 Referee: Chris Kavanagh |

| 12 January 2021 17 | Burnley | 0–1 | Manchester United | Burnley |
| 20:15 GMT | Westwood (yellow card) 62' | Report | Shaw (yellow card) 32'; Fernandes (yellow card) 45+3'; Pogba 71' | Stadium: Turf Moor; Attendance: 0 Referee: Kevin Friend |

| 16 January 2021 18 | West Ham United | 1–0 | Burnley | Stratford |
| 15:00 GMT | Antonio 9'; Souček (yellow card) 73'; Ogbonna (yellow card) 83' | Report | Barnes (yellow card) 63' | Stadium: London Stadium; Attendance: 0 Referee: Chris Kavanagh |

| 21 January 2021 19 | Liverpool | 0–1 | Burnley | Anfield, Liverpool |
| 20:00 GMT | Fabinho (yellow card) 45+2'; Matip (yellow card) 87' | Report | Barnes (yellow card) 39', (goal) 83' (pen.) | Stadium: Anfield; Attendance: 0 Referee: Mike Dean |

| 27 January 2021 20 | Burnley | 3–2 | Aston Villa | Burnley |
| 18:00 GMT | Tarkowski (yellow card) 22'; Mee 52'; McNeil 76'; Wood 79' | Report | Watkins 14'; Grealish 68' | Stadium: Turf Moor; Attendance: 0 Referee: Paul Tierney |

| 31 January 2021 21 | Chelsea | 2–0 | Burnley | London |
| 12:00 GMT | Azpilicueta 40'; Alonso 84' | Report | Westwood (yellow card) 60' | Stadium: Stamford Bridge; Attendance: 0 Referee: Graham Scott |

| 3 February 2021 22 | Burnley | 0–2 | Manchester City | Burnley |
| 18:00 GMT | Stephens (yellow card) 83'; Mumbongo (yellow card) 87' | Report | Gabriel Jesus 3'; Sterling 38'; Ederson (yellow card) 76' | Stadium: Turf Moor; Attendance: 0 Referee: Martin Atkinson |

| 6 February 2021 23 | Burnley | 1–1 | Brighton & Hove Albion | Burnley |
| 15:00 GMT | Mee (yellow card) 19'; Guðmundsson (yellow card) 28', (goal) 53' | Report | Dunk 36' | Stadium: Turf Moor; Attendance: 0 Referee: Anthony Taylor |

| 13 February 2021 24 | Crystal Palace | 0–3 | Burnley | Selhurst |
| 15:00 GMT | | Report | Guðmundsson 5'; Rodriguez 10'; Lowton 47' | Stadium: Selhurst Park; Attendance: 0 Referee: Michael Oliver |

| 17 February 2021 16 | Burnley | 1–1 | Fulham | Burnley |
| 18:00 GMT | Brady (yellow card) 46'; Barnes 52' | Report | Loftus-Cheek (yellow card) 16'; Aina 49' | Stadium: Turf Moor; Attendance: 0 Referee: Jon Moss |
Note: The match originally scheduled for 3 January 2021, but postponed due to safety concerns following a COVID-19 outbreak at Fulham FC.

| 20 February 2021 25 | Burnley | 0–0 | West Bromwich Albion | Burnley |
| 15:00 GMT | Cork (yellow card) 76'; Mee (yellow card) 90+3'; Lowton (yellow card) 90+4' | Report | Ajayi (red card) 30' | Stadium: Turf Moor; Attendance: 0 Referee: Mike Dean |

| 28 February 2021 26 | Tottenham Hotspur | 4–0 | Burnley | Tottenham |
| 14:00 GMT | Bale 2', 55'; Kane 15'; Lucas 31' | Report | | Stadium: Tottenham Hotspur Stadium; Attendance: 0 Referee: Kevin Friend |

| 3 March 2021 27 | Burnley | 1–1 | Leicester City | Burnley |
| 18:00 GMT | Vydra 4' | Report | Iheanacho 34'; Fofana (yellow card) 79'; Pereira (yellow card) 90+2' | Stadium: Turf Moor; Attendance: 0 Referee: Andrew Madley |

| 6 March 2021 28 | Burnley | 1–1 | Arsenal | Burnley |
| 12:30 GMT | Wood 39'; Pieters (yellow card) 71' | Report | Aubameyang 6'; Saka (yellow card) 55' | Stadium: Turf Moor; Attendance: 0 Referee: Andre Marriner |

| 13 March 2021 29 | Everton | 1–2 | Burnley | Walton, Liverpool |
| 17:30 GMT | Calvert-Lewin 32' | Report | Wood 13'; McNeil 24'; Westwood (yellow card) 38'; Lowton (yellow card) 45+2'; Tarkowski (yellow card) 76'; Pope (yellow card) 85' | Stadium: Goodison Park; Attendance: 0 Referee: Jon Moss |

| 4 April 2021 30 | Southampton | 3–2 | Burnley | Southampton |
| 12:00 BST | Armstrong 31'; Ings 42'; Redmond 66' | Report | Wood 12' (pen.); Vydra 28' | Stadium: St Mary's Stadium; Attendance: 0 Referee: Andre Marriner |

| 11 April 2021 31 | Burnley | 1–2 | Newcastle United | Burnley |
| 12:00 BST | Vydra 18'; Brownhill (yellow card) 69' | Report | Murphy 59'; Saint-Maximin 64' | Stadium: Turf Moor; Attendance: 0 Referee: Anthony Taylor |

| 18 April 2021 32 | Manchester United | 3–1 | Burnley | Trafford |
| 16:00 BST | Wan-Bissaka (yellow card) 26'; Greenwood 48', 84'; Cavani 90+3' | Report | Tarkowski 50', (yellow card) 89'; Cork (yellow card) 57' | Stadium: Old Trafford; Attendance: 0 Referee: Jon Moss |

| 25 April 2021 33 | Wolverhampton Wanderers | 0–4 | Burnley | Wolverhampton |
| 12:00 BST | Traoré (yellow card) 39' | Report | Wood 15', 21', 44'; Tarkowski (yellow card) 39'; Lowton (yellow card) 42'; Westwood 85' | Stadium: Molineux; Attendance: 0 Referee: Darren England |

| 3 May 2021 34 | Burnley | 1–2 | West Ham United | Burnley |
| 20:15 BST | Wood 19' (pen.); Mee (yellow card) 85'; Guðmundsson (yellow card) 87' | Report | Antonio 21', 29'; Dawson (yellow card) 86' | Stadium: Turf Moor; Attendance: 0 Referee: Anthony Taylor |

| 10 May 2021 35 | Fulham | 0–2 | Burnley | Fulham |
| 20:00 BST | Zambo Anguissa (yellow card) 40'; Lemina (yellow card) 83' | Report | Westwood 35'; Wood 44' | Stadium: Craven Cottage; Attendance: 0 Referee: David Coote |

| 15 May 2021 36 | Burnley | 0–4 | Leeds United | Burnley |
| 12:30 BST | Westwood (yellow card) 65' | Report | Klich 44'; Harrison 60'; Phillips (yellow card) 63'; Rodrigo 77', 79' | Stadium: Turf Moor; Attendance: 0 Referee: Graham Scott |

| 19 May 2021 37 | Burnley | 0–3 | Liverpool | Burnley |
| 20:15 BST | | Report | Firmino 43'; Phillips 52'; Oxlade-Chamberlain 88' | Stadium: Turf Moor; Attendance: 3,387; Referee: Chris Kavanagh |

| 23 May 2021 38 | Sheffield United | 1–0 | Burnley | Highfield, Sheffield |
| 16:00 BST | Baldock (yellow card) 21'; McGoldrick 24'; Fleck (yellow card) 38'; Basham (yellow card) 65' | Report | Dunne (yellow card) 88' | Stadium: Bramall Lane; Attendance: 8,000; Referee: Kevin Friend |

=== FA Cup ===
The third round draw was made on 30 November, with Premier League and EFL Championship clubs all entering the competition. The draw for the fourth and fifth round were made on 11 January, conducted by Peter Crouch.

| 9 January 2021 Third round | Burnley | 1–1 (a.e.t.) (4–3 p) | Milton Keynes Dons | Burnley |
| 15:00 GMT | Vydra 90+4'; Pieters (yellow card) 114'; Bardsley (yellow card) 119' | Report | Jerome 29'; Fraser (yellow card) 90+4' | Stadium: Turf Moor; Attendance: 0 Referee: Jon Moss |
| | Penalties |
| | Vydra (penalty missed); Lowton (penalty scored); Stephens (penalty scored); Benson (penalty scored); Bardlsey (penalty scored) | | (penalty scored) Poole; (penalty scored) Mason; (penalty missed) Sørensen; (penalty missed) Gladwin; (penalty scored) Fraser |

| 24 January 2021 Fourth round | Fulham | 0–3 | Burnley | Fulham |
| 14:30 GMT | Kamara (yellow card) 85' | Report | Rodriguez 31', 71' (pen.); Tarkowski (yellow card) 75'; Pieters (yellow card) 80'; Long 81' | Stadium: Craven Cottage; Attendance: 0 Referee: Andrew Madley |

| 9 February 2021 Fifth round | Burnley | 0–2 | Bournemouth | Burnley |
| 17:30 GMT | McNeil (yellow card) 85'; Bardsley (yellow card) 90' | Report | Surridge 21'; Stanislas 88' (pen.); Lerma (yellow card) 90+4' | Stadium: Turf Moor; Attendance: 0 Referee: Darren England |

=== EFL Cup ===
The draw for both the second and third round were confirmed on 6 September, live on Sky Sports by Phil Babb. The fourth round draw was conducted on 17 September 2020 by Laura Woods and Lee Hendrie live on Sky Sports.

| 17 September 2020 Second round | Burnley | 1–1 (5–4 p) | Sheffield United | Burnley |
| 17:30 BST | Vydra 67' | Report | McGoldrick 4'; Jagielka (yellow card) 68'; Ampadu (yellow card) 81' | Stadium: Turf Moor; Attendance: 0 Referee: Paul Tierney |
| | Penalties |
| | Wood (penalty scored); Vydra (penalty scored); Brownhill (penalty scored); Pieters (penalty scored); Brady (penalty scored) | | (penalty scored) Norwood; (penalty missed) McBurnie; (penalty scored) Sharp; (penalty scored) Berge; (penalty scored) Osborn |

| 23 September 2020 Third round | Millwall | 0–2 | Burnley | Bermondsey |
| 19:00 BST | | Report | Brownhill 45', (yellow card) 53'; Thomas (yellow card) 56'; Westwood (yellow card) 78'; Vydra 90+3' | Stadium: The Den; Attendance: 0 Referee: Andy Davies |

| 30 September 2020 Fourth round | Burnley | 0–3 | Manchester City | Burnley |
| 19:00 BST | | Report | Sterling 35', 49', (yellow card) 76'; Torres 65'; Silva (yellow card) 90' | Stadium: Turf Moor; Attendance: 0 Referee: Andrew Madley |

== Appearances and goals ==
Numbers in parentheses denote appearances as substitute.
Players with names struck through and marked † left the club during the playing season.
Players with names in italics and marked * were on loan from another club for the whole of their season with Burnley.
Players listed with no appearances have been in the matchday squad but only as unused substitutes.
Key to positions: GK – Goalkeeper; DF – Defender; MF – Midfielder; FW – Forward

Players contracted for the 2020–21 season
| No. | Pos. | Nat. | Name | League | | FA Cup | | League Cup | | Total | | Discipline | |
| No. | Pos. | Nat. | Name | Apps | Goals | Apps | Goals | Apps | Goals | Apps | Goals | A yellow rectangle, denoting the yellow penalty card shown to a player being cautioned | A red rectangle, denoting the red penalty card shown to a player being sent off |
|---|---|---|---|---|---|---|---|---|---|---|---|---|---|
| 1 | GK | ENG | Nick Pope | 32 | 0 | 0 | 0 | 1 | 0 | 33 | 0 | 1 | 0 |
| 2 | DF | ENG | Matthew Lowton | 34 | 1 | 0 (3) | 0 | 3 | 0 | 37 (3) | 1 | 5 | 0 |
| 3 | DF | ENG | Charlie Taylor | 28 (1) | 0 | 0 | 0 | 3 | 0 | 31 (1) | 0 | 1 | 0 |
| 4 | MF | ENG | Jack Cork | 15 (1) | 0 | 2 | 0 | 0 | 0 | 17 (1) | 0 | 2 | 0 |
| 5 | DF | ENG | James Tarkowski | 36 | 1 | 2 | 0 | 1 | 0 | 39 | 1 | 7 | 0 |
| 6 | DF | ENG | Ben Mee | 30 | 2 | 1 | 0 | 0 | 0 | 31 | 2 | 3 | 0 |
| 7 | MF | ISL | Jóhann Berg Guðmundsson | 16 (6) | 2 | 3 | 0 | 1 | 0 | 20 (6) | 2 | 2 | 0 |
| 8 | MF | ENG | Josh Brownhill | 32 (1) | 0 | 0 | 0 | 3 | 1 | 35 (1) | 1 | 3 | 0 |
| 9 | FW | NZL | Chris Wood | 32 (1) | 12 | 1 | 0 | 0 (3) | 0 | 33 (4) | 12 | 0 | 0 |
| 10 | FW | ENG | Ashley Barnes | 15 (7) | 3 | 1 (1) | 0 | 1 | 0 | 17 (8) | 3 | 4 | 0 |
| 11 | MF | ENG | Dwight McNeil | 34 (2) | 2 | 2 | 0 | 2 | 0 | 38 (2) | 2 | 2 | 0 |
| 12 | MF | IRL | Robbie Brady | 12 (7) | 1 | 1 | 0 | 1 | 0 | 14 (7) | 1 | 3 | 0 |
| 14 | DF | ENG | Ben Gibson | 0 | 0 | 0 | 0 | 0 | 0 | 0 | 0 | 0 | 0 |
| 15 | GK | NIR | Bailey Peacock-Farrell | 4 | 0 | 2 | 0 | 2 | 0 | 8 | 0 | 0 | 0 |
| 16 | MF | ENG | Dale Stephens | 3 (4) | 0 | 3 | 0 | 0 | 0 | 6 (4) | 0 | 1 | 0 |
| 18 | MF | ENG | Ashley Westwood | 38 | 3 | 0 (1) | 0 | 2 (1) | 0 | 40 (2) | 3 | 8 | 0 |
| 19 | FW | ENG | Jay Rodriguez | 12 (19) | 1 | 2 | 2 | 2 | 0 | 16 (19) | 3 | 3 | 0 |
| 23 | DF | NED | Erik Pieters | 13 (7) | 0 | 2 | 0 | 2 (1) | 0 | 17 (8) | 0 | 3 | 0 |
| 25 | GK | ENG | Will Norris | 2 | 0 | 1 | 0 | 0 | 0 | 3 | 0 | 0 | 0 |
| 26 | DF | SCO | Phil Bardsley | 3 (1) | 0 | 3 | 0 | 0 (1) | 0 | 6 (2) | 0 | 4 | 0 |
| 27 | FW | CZE | Matěj Vydra | 15 (13) | 3 | 2 (1) | 1 | 3 | 2 | 20 (14) | 6 | 0 | 0 |
| 28 | DF | IRL | Kevin Long | 7 (1) | 0 | 2 | 1 | 2 | 0 | 11 (1) | 1 | 2 | 0 |
| 33 | FW | ENG | Max Thompson | 0 | 0 | 0 | 0 | 0 | 0 | 0 | 0 | 0 | 0 |
| 34 | DF | IRL | Jimmy Dunne | 3 | 1 | 1 (1) | 0 | 2 | 0 | 6 (1) | 1 | 1 | 0 |
| 35 | MF | FRA | Anthony Gomez Mancini | 0 | 0 | 0 | 0 | 0 | 0 | 0 | 0 | 0 | 0 |
| 37 | DF | ENG | Bobby Thomas | 0 | 0 | 0 | 0 | 1 | 0 | 1 | 0 | 1 | 0 |
| 38 | FW | ENG | Lewis Richardson | 0 (2) | 0 | 0 | 0 | 0 | 0 | 0 (2) | 0 | 0 | 0 |
| 41 | MF | ENG | Josh Benson | 2 (4) | 0 | 1 (2) | 0 | 1 (2) | 0 | 4 (8) | 0 | 0 | 0 |
| 44 | MF | ENG | Mace Goodridge | 0 | 0 | 0 | 0 | 0 | 0 | 0 | 0 | 0 | 0 |
| 45 | DF | ENG | Anthony Glennon | 0 | 0 | 1 (1) | 0 | 0 (1) | 0 | 1 (2) | 0 | 0 | 0 |
| 46 | FW | SWE | Joel Mumbongo | 0 (4) | 0 | 0 (3) | 0 | 0 | 0 | 0 (7) | 0 | 1 | 0 |
