= 2021–22 Premier League =

Football season in England

Premier League
- Season: 2021–22
- Dates: 13 August 2021 – 22 May 2022
- Champions: Manchester City; 6th Premier League title 8th English title
- Relegated: Burnley; Watford; Norwich City
- Champions League: Manchester City; Liverpool; Chelsea; Tottenham Hotspur
- Europa League: Arsenal; Manchester United
- Europa Conference League: West Ham United
- Matches: 380
- Goals: 1,071 (2.82 per match)
- Best player: Kevin De Bruyne
- Top goalscorer: Mohamed Salah; Son Heung-min (23 goals each)
- Best goalkeeper: Alisson; Ederson (20 clean sheets each)
- Biggest home win: Chelsea 7–0 Norwich City (23 October 2021); Manchester City 7–0 Leeds United (14 December 2021)
- Biggest away win: Southampton 0–6 Chelsea (9 April 2022)
- Highest scoring: Manchester City 6–3 Leicester City (26 December 2021)
- Longest winning run: 12 matches Manchester City
- Longest unbeaten run: 19 matches Liverpool
- Longest winless run: 14 matches Newcastle United
- Longest losing run: 6 matches Brighton & Hove Albion; Leeds United; Norwich City (thrice); Watford (twice)
- Highest attendance: 73,564; Manchester United 1–1 Chelsea (28 April 2022)
- Lowest attendance: 16,479; Brentford 2–0 Arsenal (13 August 2021)
- Total attendance: 15,195,647
- Average attendance: 39,989

The 2021–22 Premier League was the 30th season of the Premier League, the top English professional league for association football clubs since its establishment in 1992, and the 123rd season of top-flight English football overall. The start and end dates for the season were released on 25 March 2021, and the fixtures were released on 16 June 2021.

Manchester City successfully defended their title, winning for the second consecutive year, securing a sixth Premier League title and eighth English league title overall on the last day of the campaign; it was also the club's fourth title in the last five seasons.

== Summary ==
Manchester City were the defending champions, having won their fifth Premier League title during the previous season.

This season saw the return of full attendance, after the final third of the 2019–20 and the entirety of the 2020–21 seasons were held with limited or no attendance due to the restrictions caused by the COVID-19 pandemic. This season was the second season to feature a winter break, with no Premier League matches scheduled between 24 January and 4 February 2022.

=== The race for first place ===
The early title race was dominated by Liverpool, Manchester City and Chelsea, who were separated by two points by early December. By December, Chelsea led the way following a run of just one defeat in 14 matches until a shock defeat to West Ham United gave City the edge. A run of 12 consecutive victories, concluding in a victory over Chelsea that essentially ended their title hopes, gave Manchester City a 13-point lead by January (though Liverpool had two games in hand due to COVID-19 postponements). Liverpool then went on a 10-game winning run, including both their games in hand, helped by a costly 2–3 home loss for City to Tottenham Hotspur in February, to cut City's lead to a single point ahead of their meeting at the Etihad on 10 April. A 2–2 draw retained City's narrow lead going into the final weeks of the season.

=== Newcastle takeover ===
On 7 October, Saudi Arabia's Public Investment Fund purchased an 80% stake and completed the £300m takeover of Newcastle United, ending the 14-year ownership of Mike Ashley. On 12 October 2021, an emergency meeting was convened by the other 19 Premier League clubs between themselves and the Premier League, where they voiced their anger at the league's decision to ratify the takeover; Newcastle United were the only Premier League club to be excluded from attending the meeting. On 18 November 2021, Premier League clubs voted to tighten the Premier League's financial controls in order to limit Newcastle United's spending power.

At the time of the takeover, Newcastle were in 19th position having failed to win any of their first seven games. The new ownership announced the departure of Steve Bruce and hired Eddie Howe; while Newcastle did not win a game until the 15th attempt, their form improved dramatically after five signings in the January transfer window. A run of 12 wins in their final 18 games secured an 11th place finish.

=== COVID-19 outbreaks force postponements ===
In December 2021, multiple matches were postponed due to the COVID-19 outbreaks in multiple clubs, with many clubs calling for the league to shut down until 2022. Following a meeting on 20 December involving all 20 Premier League clubs, a decision was made to fulfil the fixtures over the Christmas period "where it is safe to do so". Clubs were advised that if they had 13 fit players, plus a goalkeeper, then they should fulfil their fixtures.

=== Abramovich sanctions ===
On 2 March, Roman Abramovich announced that he planned to sell Chelsea, stating his intent to donate all proceeds of the sale to the victims of the Russian invasion of Ukraine. In the following days, numerous reports about interested buyers surfaced including Swiss billionaire Hansjörg Wyss, Los Angeles Dodgers and Lakers shareholder Todd Boehly, Pakistani businessman Javed Afridi, and other unnamed parties.

On 10 March, the British government froze all of Roman Abramovich's assets due to his close personal ties with Vladimir Putin, leaving Chelsea unable to sell tickets or merchandise, buy or sell players, and negotiate contracts. The UK government issued Chelsea a licence that allowed the club to continue footballing activities, ensured that employees continued to be paid, and allowed season-ticket holders to continue to attend games.

=== Final day climax ===
Going into the last day of the season, the title race, Champions League, Europa League, Conference League qualifications, and the relegation battle were all decided on the final day for the first time in Premier League history.

==== Title ====
With a one point advantage over Liverpool, Manchester City needed to match or better Liverpool's result to clinch back-to-back titles. Liverpool needed to win and hope that Manchester City dropped points to Aston Villa, managed by former Liverpool captain Steven Gerrard.

Liverpool went behind to Wolves in the 3rd minute, but quickly equalised. Aston Villa took a shock 2–0 lead after 63 minutes thanks to goals from Matty Cash and Philippe Coutinho. Manchester City then scored three goals (from substitute Ilkay Gundogan and Rodri) in under six minutes to take the lead in the match. Two late goals from Liverpool's Mohamed Salah and Andy Robertson meant they won their game 3–1, but their result was irrelevant as City's 3–2 comeback win over Villa confirmed City as champions for the fourth time in five seasons.

==== Relegation ====
Norwich City, who were promoted from the Championship last season, suffered relegation with four games to spare following a 10th loss in 12 matches, against Aston Villa. Norwich also recorded the worst goal difference since Derby County in 2007–08. The next weekend Watford, who were also promoted, were the second to go down after defeat to Crystal Palace.

The final relegation spot was contested by Everton, Burnley and Leeds United, all of whom spent time in the bottom three in the final months of the season. Everton endured a run of just three wins between October and April, but victories against Manchester United, Chelsea and Leicester City meant that victory over Crystal Palace in their final home game of the season would secure safety. Although they went 2–0 down at half time, Dominic Calvert-Lewin's goal in the 85th minute to put Everton 3–2 ahead had fans invading the pitch. Fans stormed the pitch again at full time, after avoiding what would have been the club's first relegation since 1951 and prolonging their top-flight status for a 69th year running.

Burnley and Leeds went into the final day level on 35 points, with Burnley having the edge over Leeds due to a superior goal difference. Burnley fell behind 2–0 to Newcastle, while a Raphinha penalty put Leeds ahead against Brentford in the 54th minute. A 78th minute equaliser from Brentford and a Maxwel Cornet goal gave Burnley hope of survival, but an added time winner from Jack Harrison confirmed safety for Leeds and relegated Burnley after six consecutive seasons in the Premier League.

==== Champions League, Europa League and Conference League spots ====
With Chelsea securing a top-four finish for a fourth straight season, only Tottenham and Arsenal were in the hunt for the final Champions League spot. Arsenal were in 4th with three games remaining, but Arsenal's defeats against Tottenham in the North London derby and Newcastle in their final away game combined with Tottenham victory against Burnley in their final home game saw Tottenham leapfrog them with one game remaining. Spurs just needed a point against already relegated Norwich on the final day to secure Champions League qualification for the first time in three years, and won 5–0 with two goals from Son Heung-min, who secured a joint Golden Boot with Mohamed Salah. Arsenal failed to qualify for the Champions League for a sixth season, despite beating Everton 5–1.

Manchester United suffered another difficult season, culminating in the sacking of Ole Gunnar Solskjær on 21 November 2021, which followed a humiliating 4–1 defeat to Watford. Ralf Rangnick would be appointed as interim manager for the rest of the season. The club ultimately finished the season in 6th, with a goal difference of zero and their worst points tally in the Premier League era, at just 58, as well as losing on the final day. United still managed to qualify for the Europa League, as West Ham's 3–1 defeat at Brighton prevented them from qualifying for back-to-back Europa League spots; they instead had to settle for a spot in the Europa Conference League.

=== Other teams ===
Brentford manager Thomas Frank had a promising first season in the Premier League. Thanks to January signing Christian Eriksen, the team won seven out of their last 11 games of the season, which included a 4–1 victory against Chelsea. The Dane guided the Bees to a 13th place finish, 11 points above the relegation zone and not spending a single week in the relegation zone.

Brighton had their best season in the top-flight with Graham Potter's side finishing ninth with a total of 51 points, despite their poor home record. Their 4–0 win against Manchester United was another new high for them, as it was also their biggest top-flight win.

== Teams ==
Twenty teams competed in the league – the top seventeen teams from the previous season and the three teams promoted from the Championship. The promoted teams were Norwich City, Watford (who both returned to the top flight after a year's absence) and Brentford (who returned to the top flight after a seventy-four year absence). This was also Brentford's first season in the Premier League. They replaced Fulham, West Bromwich Albion (both teams relegated to the Championship after just one year in the top flight) and Sheffield United (relegated after a two-year top flight spell).

=== Stadiums and locations ===
Locations of the 2021–22 Premier League teams
Location of clubs around Greater London for the 2021–22 Premier League season

Note: Table lists in alphabetical order. Source:

Team	Location	Stadium	Capacity
Arsenal	London (Holloway)	Emirates Stadium	60,704
Aston Villa	Birmingham	Villa Park	42,682
Brentford	London (Brentford)	Brentford Community Stadium	17,250
Brighton & Hove Albion	Falmer	Falmer Stadium	31,800
Burnley	Burnley	Turf Moor	21,944
Chelsea	London (Fulham)	Stamford Bridge	40,834
Crystal Palace	London (Selhurst)	Selhurst Park	25,486
Everton	Liverpool (Walton)	Goodison Park	39,414
Leeds United	Leeds	Elland Road	37,792
Leicester City	Leicester	King Power Stadium	32,312
Liverpool	Liverpool (Anfield)	Anfield	53,394
Manchester City	Manchester (Bradford)	City of Manchester Stadium	53,400
Manchester United	Trafford	Old Trafford	74,140
Newcastle United	Newcastle upon Tyne	St James' Park	52,305
Norwich City	Norwich	Carrow Road	27,244
Southampton	Southampton	St Mary's Stadium	32,384
Tottenham Hotspur	London (Tottenham)	Tottenham Hotspur Stadium	62,850
Watford	Watford	Vicarage Road	22,200
West Ham United	London (Stratford)	London Stadium	60,000
Wolverhampton Wanderers	Wolverhampton	Molineux Stadium	32,050

=== Personnel and kits ===
Team	Manager	Captain	Kit manufacturer	Shirt sponsor (chest)	Shirt sponsor (sleeve)
Arsenal	(Spain) Mikel Arteta	(France) Alexandre Lacazette^{a}	Adidas	Emirates	Visit Rwanda
Aston Villa	(England) Steven Gerrard	(England) Tyrone Mings	Kappa	Cazoo	OB Sports
Brentford	(Denmark) Thomas Frank	(Sweden) Pontus Jansson	Umbro	Hollywoodbets	Safetyculture
Brighton & Hove Albion	(England) Graham Potter	(England) Lewis Dunk	Nike	American Express	SnickersUK.com
Burnley	(England) Mike Jackson (England) Connor King (England) Ben Mee (joint-caretakers)	(England) Ben Mee	Umbro	Spreadex Sports	AstroPay
Chelsea	(Germany) Thomas Tuchel	(Spain) César Azpilicueta	Nike	Three^{c}	Hyundai^{c}
Crystal Palace	(France) Patrick Vieira	(Serbia) Luka Milivojević	Puma	W88	Facebank
Everton	(England) Frank Lampard	(Republic of Ireland) Séamus Coleman	Hummel	Cazoo	None
Leeds United	(United States) Jesse Marsch	(Scotland) Liam Cooper	Adidas	SBOTOP	BOXT
Leicester City	(Northern Ireland) Brendan Rodgers	(Denmark) Kasper Schmeichel	Adidas	FBS	Bia Saigon
Liverpool	(Germany) Jürgen Klopp	(England) Jordan Henderson	Nike	Standard Chartered	Expedia
Manchester City	(Spain) Pep Guardiola	(Brazil) Fernandinho	Puma	Etihad Airways	Nexen Tire
Manchester United	(Germany) Ralf Rangnick (interim)	(England) Harry Maguire	Adidas	TeamViewer	Kohler
Newcastle United	(England) Eddie Howe	(England) Jamaal Lascelles	Castore	FUN88	Kayak
Norwich City	(England) Dean Smith	(Scotland) Grant Hanley	Joma	Lotus Cars	JD Sports
Southampton	(Austria) Ralph Hasenhüttl	(England) James Ward-Prowse	Hummel	Sportsbet.io	Virgin Media
Tottenham Hotspur	(Italy) Antonio Conte	(France) Hugo Lloris	Nike	AIA	Cinch
Watford	(England) Roy Hodgson	TBD^{b}	Kelme	Stake.com	Dogecoin
West Ham United	(Scotland) David Moyes	(England) Mark Noble	Umbro	Betway	Scope Markets
Wolverhampton Wanderers	(Portugal) Bruno Lage	(England) Conor Coady	Castore	ManBetX	Bitci.com

a. Pierre-Emerick Aubameyang was club captain at Arsenal until 14 December 2021, when he was stripped of the captaincy following a disciplinary breach; he was later let go by the club on 1 February. Alexandre Lacazette served as the de facto captain until early February, when he was officially named to the role.
b. Troy Deeney was club captain at Watford at the start of the season, but left the club on 30 August. Moussa Sissoko was named the captain following Deeney's departure.
c. Three and Hyundai suspended their sponsorships of Chelsea in response to sanctions imposed on the club and Roman Abramovich following the Russian invasion of Ukraine. The former does however remain on the club's shirt and will at least until a new kit is released the following season. Should the sponsorship be put back on hold, Three will remain Chelsea's shirt sponsor.

=== Managerial changes ===
Team	Outgoing manager	Manner of departure	Date of vacancy	Position in the table	Incoming manager	Date of appointment
Crystal Palace	(England) Roy Hodgson	End of contract	24 May 2021	Pre-season	(France) Patrick Vieira	4 July 2021
Wolverhampton Wanderers	(Portugal) Nuno Espírito Santo	Mutual consent	24 May 2021	Pre-season	(Portugal) Bruno Lage	9 June 2021
Everton	(Italy) Carlo Ancelotti	Signed by Real Madrid	1 June 2021	Pre-season	(Spain) Rafael Benítez	30 June 2021
Tottenham Hotspur	(England) Ryan Mason	End of caretaker spell	30 June 2021	Pre-season	(Portugal) Nuno Espírito Santo	30 June 2021
Watford	(Spain) Xisco Muñoz	Sacked	3 October 2021	14th	(Italy) Claudio Ranieri	4 October 2021
Newcastle United	(England) Steve Bruce	Mutual consent	20 October 2021	19th	(England) Graeme Jones (interim)	20 October 2021
Tottenham Hotspur	(Portugal) Nuno Espírito Santo	Sacked	1 November 2021	8th	(Italy) Antonio Conte	2 November 2021
Norwich City	(Germany) Daniel Farke	Sacked	6 November 2021	20th	(England) Dean Smith	15 November 2021
Aston Villa	(England) Dean Smith	Sacked	7 November 2021	15th	(England) Steven Gerrard	11 November 2021
Newcastle United	(England) Graeme Jones	End of interim spell	8 November 2021	19th	(England) Eddie Howe	8 November 2021
Manchester United	(Norway) Ole Gunnar Solskjær	Sacked	21 November 2021	7th	(England) Michael Carrick (caretaker)	21 November 2021
Manchester United	(England) Michael Carrick	End of caretaker spell	2 December 2021	7th	(Germany) Ralf Rangnick (interim)	3 December 2021
Everton	(Spain) Rafael Benítez	Sacked	16 January 2022	15th	(Scotland) Duncan Ferguson (caretaker)	18 January 2022
Watford	(Italy) Claudio Ranieri	Sacked	24 January 2022	19th	(England) Roy Hodgson	25 January 2022
Everton	(Scotland) Duncan Ferguson	End of caretaker spell	31 January 2022	16th	(England) Frank Lampard	31 January 2022
Leeds United	(Argentina) Marcelo Bielsa	Sacked	27 February 2022	16th	(United States) Jesse Marsch	28 February 2022
Burnley	(England) Sean Dyche	Sacked	15 April 2022	18th	(England) Mike Jackson (lead caretaker)	15 April 2022

== League table ==
Pos	Team	Pld	W	D	L	GF	GA	GD	Pts	Qualification or relegation
1	Manchester City (C)	38	29	6	3	99	26	+73	93	Qualification for the Champions League group stage
2	Liverpool	38	28	8	2	94	26	+68	92	Qualification for the Champions League group stage
3	Chelsea	38	21	11	6	76	33	+43	74	Qualification for the Champions League group stage
4	Tottenham Hotspur	38	22	5	11	69	40	+29	71	Qualification for the Champions League group stage
5	Arsenal	38	22	3	13	61	48	+13	69	Qualification for the Europa League group stage (Note: Since the winners of the 2021–22 FA Cup and the 2021–22 EFL Cup, Liverpool, qualified for the Champions League, the spot given to the FA Cup winners (Europa League group stage) was passed to the sixth-placed team and the spot given to the League Cup winners (Europa Conference League play-off round) was passed to the seventh-placed team.)
6	Manchester United	38	16	10	12	57	57	0	58	Qualification for the Europa League group stage
7	West Ham United	38	16	8	14	60	51	+9	56	Qualification for the Europa Conference League play-off round
8	Leicester City	38	14	10	14	62	59	+3	52	
9	Brighton & Hove Albion	38	12	15	11	42	44	−2	51	
10	Wolverhampton Wanderers	38	15	6	17	38	43	−5	51	
11	Newcastle United	38	13	10	15	44	62	−18	49	
12	Crystal Palace	38	11	15	12	50	46	+4	48	
13	Brentford	38	13	7	18	48	56	−8	46	
14	Aston Villa	38	13	6	19	52	54	−2	45	
15	Southampton	38	9	13	16	43	67	−24	40	
16	Everton	38	11	6	21	43	66	−23	39	
17	Leeds United	38	9	11	18	42	79	−37	38	
18	Burnley (R)	38	7	14	17	34	53	−19	35	Relegation to EFL Championship
19	Watford (R)	38	6	5	27	34	77	−43	23	Relegation to EFL Championship
20	Norwich City (R)	38	5	7	26	23	84	−61	22	Relegation to EFL Championship

Source: Premier League
Rules for classification: 1) Points; 2) Goal difference; 3) Goals scored; 4) If the champions, relegated teams or qualified teams for UEFA competitions cannot be determined by rules 1 to 3, rules 4.1 to 4.3 are applied – 4.1) Points gained in head-to-head record between such teams; 4.2) Away goals scored in head-to-head record between such teams; 4.3) Play-offs
(C) Champions; (R) Relegated

== Results ==
Home \ Away	ARS	AVL	BRE	BHA	BUR	CHE	CRY	EVE	LEE	LEI	LIV	MCI	MUN	NEW	NOR	SOU	TOT	WAT	WHU	WOL
Arsenal	—	3–1	2–1	1–2	0–0	0–2	2–2	5–1	2–1	2–0	0–2	1–2	3–1	2–0	1–0	3–0	3–1	1–0	2–0	2–1
Aston Villa	0–1	—	1–1	2–0	1–1	1–3	1–1	3–0	3–3	2–1	1–2	1–2	2–2	2–0	2–0	4–0	0–4	0–1	1–4	2–3
Brentford	2–0	2–1	—	0–1	2–0	0–1	0–0	1–0	1–2	1–2	3–3	0–1	1–3	0–2	1–2	3–0	0–0	2–1	2–0	1–2
Brighton & Hove Albion	0–0	0–2	2–0	—	0–3	1–1	1–1	0–2	0–0	2–1	0–2	1–4	4–0	1–1	0–0	2–2	0–2	2–0	3–1	0–1
Burnley	0–1	1–3	3–1	1–2	—	0–4	3–3	3–2	1–1	0–2	0–1	0–2	1–1	1–2	0–0	2–0	1–0	0–0	0–0	1–0
Chelsea	2–4	3–0	1–4	1–1	1–1	—	3–0	1–1	3–2	1–1	2–2	0–1	1–1	1–0	7–0	3–1	2–0	2–1	1–0	2–2
Crystal Palace	3–0	1–2	0–0	1–1	1–1	0–1	—	3–1	0–0	2–2	1–3	0–0	1–0	1–1	3–0	2–2	3–0	1–0	2–3	2–0
Everton	2–1	0–1	2–3	2–3	3–1	1–0	3–2	—	3–0	1–1	1–4	0–1	1–0	1–0	2–0	3–1	0–0	2–5	0–1	0–1
Leeds United	1–4	0–3	2–2	1–1	3–1	0–3	1–0	2–2	—	1–1	0–3	0–4	2–4	0–1	2–1	1–1	0–4	1–0	1–2	1–1
Leicester City	0–2	0–0	2–1	1–1	2–2	0–3	2–1	1–2	1–0	—	1–0	0–1	4–2	4–0	3–0	4–1	2–3	4–2	2–2	1–0
Liverpool	4–0	1–0	3–0	2–2	2–0	1–1	3–0	2–0	6–0	2–0	—	2–2	4–0	3–1	3–1	4–0	1–1	2–0	1–0	3–1
Manchester City	5–0	3–2	2–0	3–0	2–0	1–0	0–2	3–0	7–0	6–3	2–2	—	4–1	5–0	5–0	0–0	2–3	5–1	2–1	1–0
Manchester United	3–2	0–1	3–0	2–0	3–1	1–1	1–0	1–1	5–1	1–1	0–5	0–2	—	4–1	3–2	1–1	3–2	0–0	1–0	0–1
Newcastle United	2–0	1–0	3–3	2–1	1–0	0–3	1–0	3–1	1–1	2–1	0–1	0–4	1–1	—	1–1	2–2	2–3	1–1	2–4	1–0
Norwich City	0–5	0–2	1–3	0–0	2–0	1–3	1–1	2–1	1–2	1–2	0–3	0–4	0–1	0–3	—	2–1	0–5	1–3	0–4	0–0
Southampton	1–0	1–0	4–1	1–1	2–2	0–6	1–2	2–0	1–0	2–2	1–2	1–1	1–1	1–2	2–0	—	1–1	1–2	0–0	0–1
Tottenham Hotspur	3–0	2–1	2–0	0–1	1–0	0–3	3–0	5–0	2–1	3–1	2–2	1–0	0–3	5–1	3–0	2–3	—	1–0	3–1	0–2
Watford	2–3	3–2	1–2	0–2	1–2	1–2	1–4	0–0	0–3	1–5	0–5	1–3	4–1	1–1	0–3	0–1	0–1	—	1–4	0–2
West Ham United	1–2	2–1	1–2	1–1	1–1	3–2	2–2	2–1	2–3	4–1	3–2	2–2	1–2	1–1	2–0	2–3	1–0	1–0	—	1–0
Wolverhampton Wanderers	0–1	2–1	0–2	0–3	0–0	0–0	0–2	2–1	2–3	2–1	0–1	1–5	0–1	2–1	1–1	3–1	0–1	4–0	1–0	—

Source: Premier League
Legend: Blue = home team win; Yellow = draw; Red = away team win.

== Season statistics ==
=== Top scorers ===
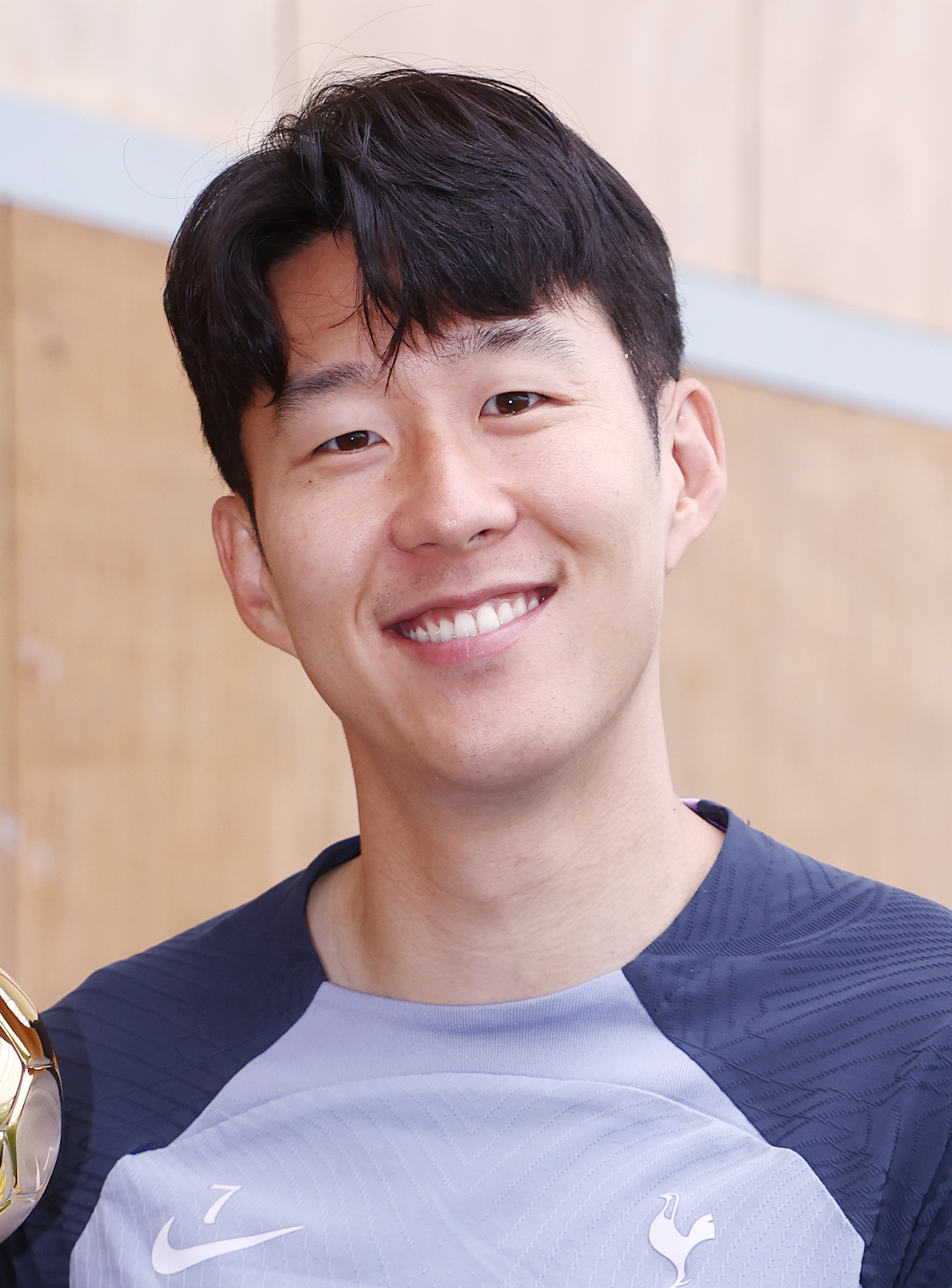
Son Heung-min became the first Asian footballer to win the Premier League Golden Boot, sharing the award with Mohamed Salah.

Rank	Player	Club	Goals
1	(Egypt) Mohamed Salah	Liverpool	23
1	(South Korea) Son Heung-min	Tottenham Hotspur	23
3	(Portugal) Cristiano Ronaldo	Manchester United	18
4	(England) Harry Kane	Tottenham Hotspur	17
5	(Senegal) Sadio Mané	Liverpool	16
6	(Belgium) Kevin De Bruyne	Manchester City	15
6	(Portugal) Diogo Jota	Liverpool	15
6	(England) Jamie Vardy	Leicester City	15
9	(Ivory Coast) Wilfried Zaha	Crystal Palace	14
10	(England) Raheem Sterling	Manchester City	13

==== Hat-tricks ====
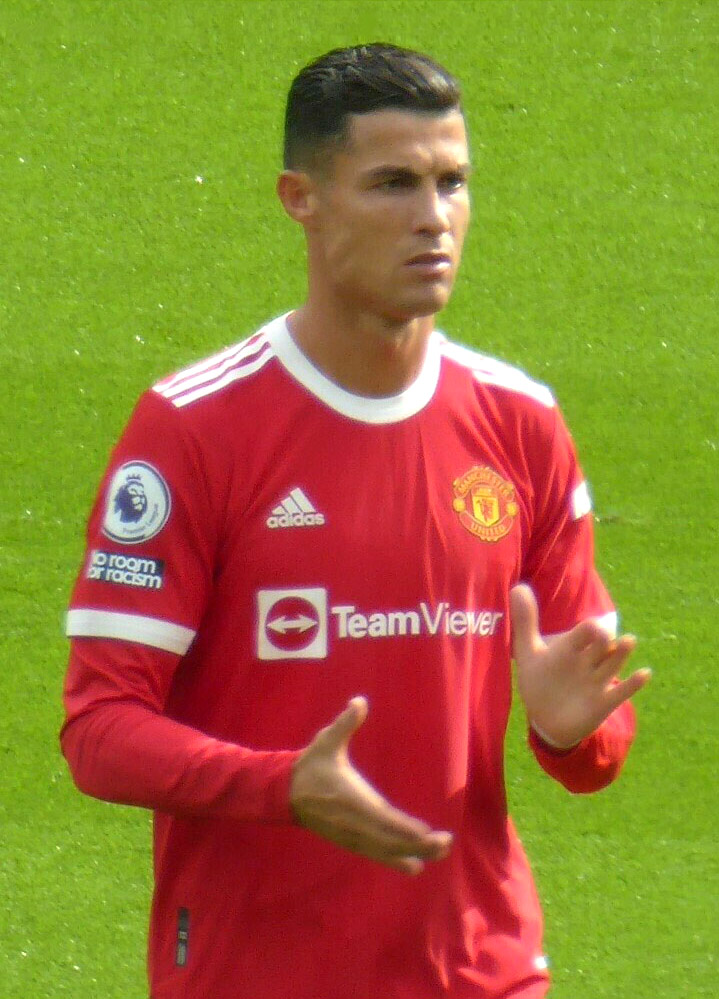
Cristiano Ronaldo scored two hat-tricks in this season, the most by a single player.

Player	For	Against	Result	Date
(Portugal) Bruno Fernandes	Manchester United	Leeds United	5–1 (H)	14 August 2021
(Brazil) Roberto Firmino	Liverpool	Watford	5–0 (A)	16 October 2021
(England) Mason Mount	Chelsea	Norwich City	7–0 (H)	23 October 2021
(Norway) Joshua King	Watford	Everton	5–2 (A)	23 October 2021
(Egypt) Mohamed Salah	Liverpool	Manchester United	5–0 (A)	24 October 2021
(England) Jack Harrison	Leeds United	West Ham United	3–2 (A)	16 January 2022
(England) Raheem Sterling	Manchester City	Norwich City	4–0 (A)	12 February 2022
(England) Ivan Toney	Brentford	Norwich City	3–1 (A)	5 March 2022
(Portugal) Cristiano Ronaldo	Manchester United	Tottenham Hotspur	3–2 (H)	12 March 2022
(South Korea) Son Heung-min	Tottenham Hotspur	Aston Villa	4–0 (A)	9 April 2022
(Portugal) Cristiano Ronaldo	Manchester United	Norwich City	3–2 (H)	16 April 2022
(Brazil) Gabriel Jesus^{4}	Manchester City	Watford	5–1 (H)	23 April 2022
(Belgium) Kevin De Bruyne^{4}	Manchester City	Wolverhampton Wanderers	5–1 (A)	11 May 2022

Notes

^{4} Player scored 4 goals
(H) – Home team
(A) – Away team

=== Clean sheets ===
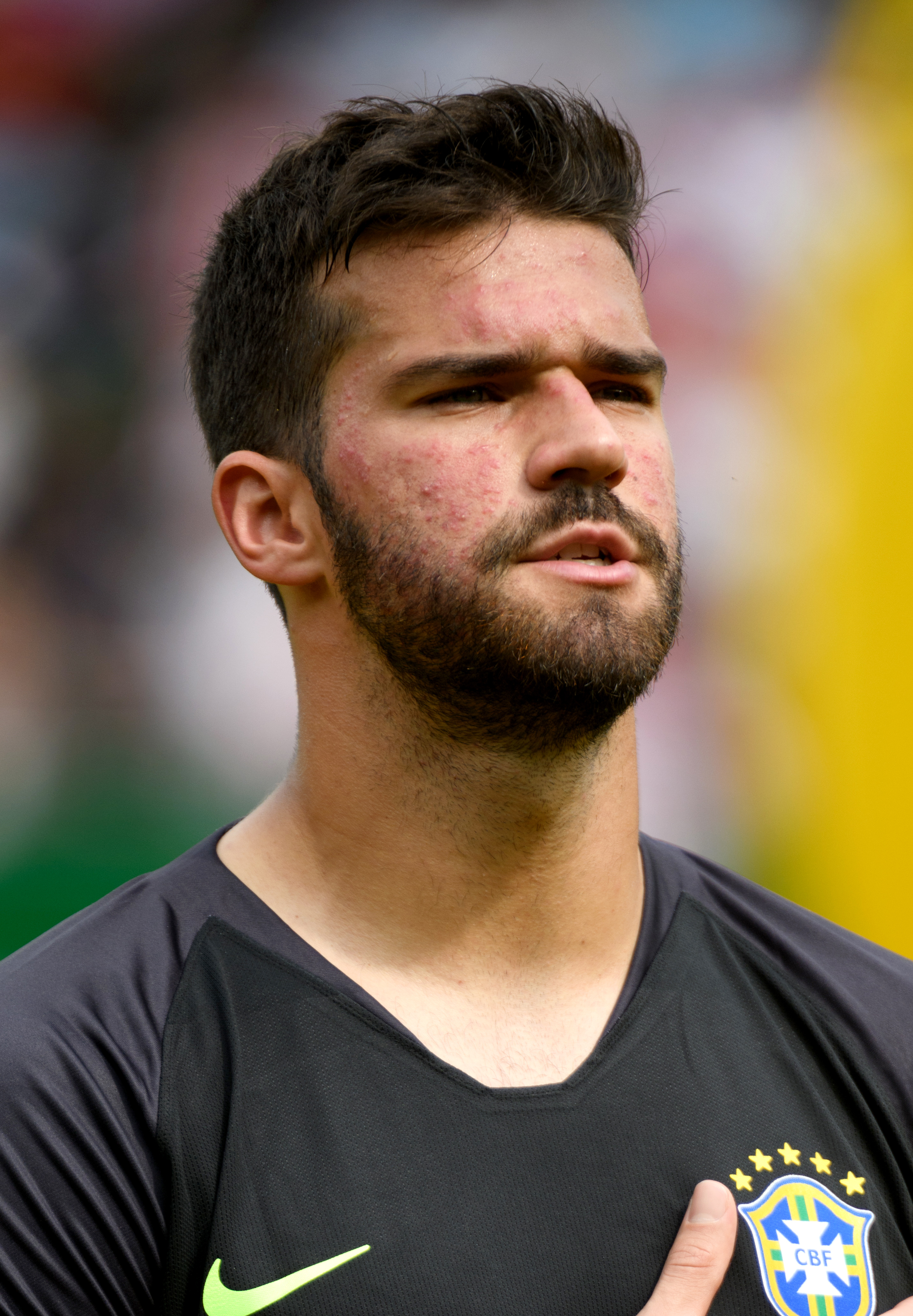
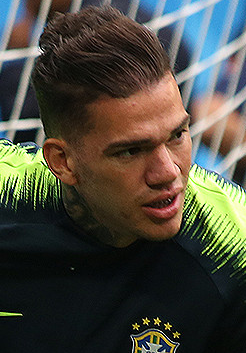
Alisson (left) and Ederson (right) won a second and third Premier League Golden Glove respectively after keeping 20 clean sheets each. This was Ederson's third consecutive Golden Glove award and the fourth consecutive season that the accolade was won by Brazilian goalkeeper(s).

Rank	Player	Club	Clean sheets
1	(Brazil) Alisson	Liverpool	20
1	(Brazil) Ederson	Manchester City	20
3	(France) Hugo Lloris	Tottenham Hotspur	16
4	(Senegal) Édouard Mendy	Chelsea	14
5	(England) Aaron Ramsdale	Arsenal	12
6	(Spain) Vicente Guaita	Crystal Palace	11
6	(Argentina) Emiliano Martínez	Aston Villa	11
6	(Portugal) José Sá	Wolverhampton Wanderers	11
6	(Spain) Robert Sánchez	Brighton & Hove Albion	11
10	(England) Nick Pope	Burnley	9

=== Discipline ===
==== Player ====
- Most yellow cards: 11
  - (Spain) Junior Firpo (Leeds United)
  - (England) Tyrone Mings (Aston Villa)
  - (England) James Tarkowski (Burnley)
- Most red cards: 2
  - (Mexico) Raúl Jiménez (Wolverhampton Wanderers)
  - (England) Ezri Konsa (Aston Villa)

==== Club ====
- Most yellow cards: 101
  - Leeds United
- Most red cards: 6
  - Everton

== Awards ==
=== Monthly awards ===
Month	Manager of the Month		Player of the Month		Goal of the Month		References
Month	Manager	Club	Player	Club	Player	Club	References
August	(Portugal) Nuno Espírito Santo	Tottenham Hotspur	(Jamaica) Michail Antonio	West Ham United	(England) Danny Ings	Aston Villa	
September	(Spain) Mikel Arteta	Arsenal	(Portugal) Cristiano Ronaldo	Manchester United	(England) Andros Townsend	Everton	
October	(Germany) Thomas Tuchel	Chelsea	(Egypt) Mohamed Salah	Liverpool	(Egypt) Mohamed Salah	Liverpool	
November	(Spain) Pep Guardiola	Manchester City	(England) Trent Alexander-Arnold	Liverpool	(Spain) Rodri	Manchester City	
December	(Spain) Pep Guardiola	Manchester City	(England) Raheem Sterling	Manchester City	(France) Alexandre Lacazette	Arsenal	
January	(Portugal) Bruno Lage	Wolverhampton Wanderers	(Spain) David de Gea	Manchester United	(Croatia) Mateo Kovačić	Chelsea	
February	(England) Eddie Howe	Newcastle United	(Cameroon) Joël Matip	Liverpool	(Ivory Coast) Wilfried Zaha	Crystal Palace	
March	(Spain) Mikel Arteta	Arsenal	(England) Harry Kane	Tottenham Hotspur	(Portugal) Cristiano Ronaldo	Manchester United	
April	(England) Michael Jackson	Burnley	(Portugal) Cristiano Ronaldo	Manchester United	(Paraguay) Miguel Almirón	Newcastle United	

=== Annual awards ===
Award	Winner	Club
Premier League Manager of the Season	(Germany) Jürgen Klopp	Liverpool
Premier League Player of the Season	(Belgium) Kevin De Bruyne	Manchester City
Premier League Young Player of the Season	(England) Phil Foden	Manchester City
Premier League Goal of the Season	(Egypt) Mohamed Salah	Liverpool
Premier League Save of the Season	(England) Jordan Pickford	Everton
Premier League Game Changer of the Season	(Germany) İlkay Gündoğan	Manchester City
Premier League Most Powerful Goal	(Brazil) Fernandinho	Manchester City
PFA Players' Player of the Year	(Egypt) Mohamed Salah	Liverpool
PFA Young Player of the Year	(England) Phil Foden	Manchester City
FWA Footballer of the Year	(Egypt) Mohamed Salah	Liverpool
PFA Fans' Player of the Year	(Egypt) Mohamed Salah	Liverpool

PFA Team of the Year
Goalkeeper	(Brazil) Alisson (Liverpool)			
Defenders	(England) Trent Alexander-Arnold (Liverpool)	(Netherlands) Virgil van Dijk (Liverpool)	(Germany) Antonio Rüdiger (Chelsea)	(Portugal) João Cancelo (Manchester City)
Midfielders	(Belgium) Kevin De Bruyne (Manchester City)		(Spain) Thiago (Liverpool)	(Portugal) Bernardo Silva (Manchester City)
Forwards	(Egypt) Mohamed Salah (Liverpool)		(Portugal) Cristiano Ronaldo (Manchester United)	(Senegal) Sadio Mané (Liverpool)

== Attendances ==
#	Football club	Home games	Average attendance
1	Manchester United	19	73,150
2	Arsenal FC	19	59,776
3	West Ham United	19	58,894
4	Tottenham Hotspur	19	56,428
5	Liverpool FC	19	53,027
6	Manchester City	19	52,774
7	Newcastle United	19	51,487
8	Aston Villa	19	41,681
9	Everton FC	19	38,945
10	Chelsea FC	19	37,810
11	Leeds United	19	36,308
12	Leicester City	19	32,061
13	Brighton & Hove Albion	19	30,988
14	Wolverhampton Wanderers	19	30,741
15	Southampton FC	19	29,889
16	Norwich City	19	26,836
17	Crystal Palace FC	19	24,282
18	Watford FC	19	20,614
19	Burnley FC	19	19,399
20	Brentford FC	19	16,912
