= David Collins (footballer, born 1971) =

Irish former footballer

Personal information
- Full name: David Collins
- Date of birth: 30 October 1971 (age 55)
- Place of birth: Dublin, Republic of Ireland
- Position: Defender

Youth career
- Cherry Orchard

Senior career*
Years	Team	Apps	(Gls)
1988–1992	Liverpool	0	(0)
1991–1992	→ Wigan Athletic (loan)	9	(0)
1992–1995	Oxford United	42	(0)
1995–1996	Shelbourne	3	(0)
1996–1997	Athlone Town	28	(4)
Total		82	(4)
- * Club domestic league appearances and goals

David Collins (born 30 October 1971) is an Irish former footballer who played in the Football League for Oxford United and Wigan Athletic.

== Personal life ==
Collins' family includes a number of other footballers, including his son Nathan Collins. His brother, Eamonn Collins, played with many sides including Southampton and Portsmouth before going on to manage St Patrick's Athletic. His eldest son Josh Collins was also a footballer who played in the League of Ireland Premier Division for UCD and Waterford.
