= Nathan Collins =

Irish footballer (born 2001)

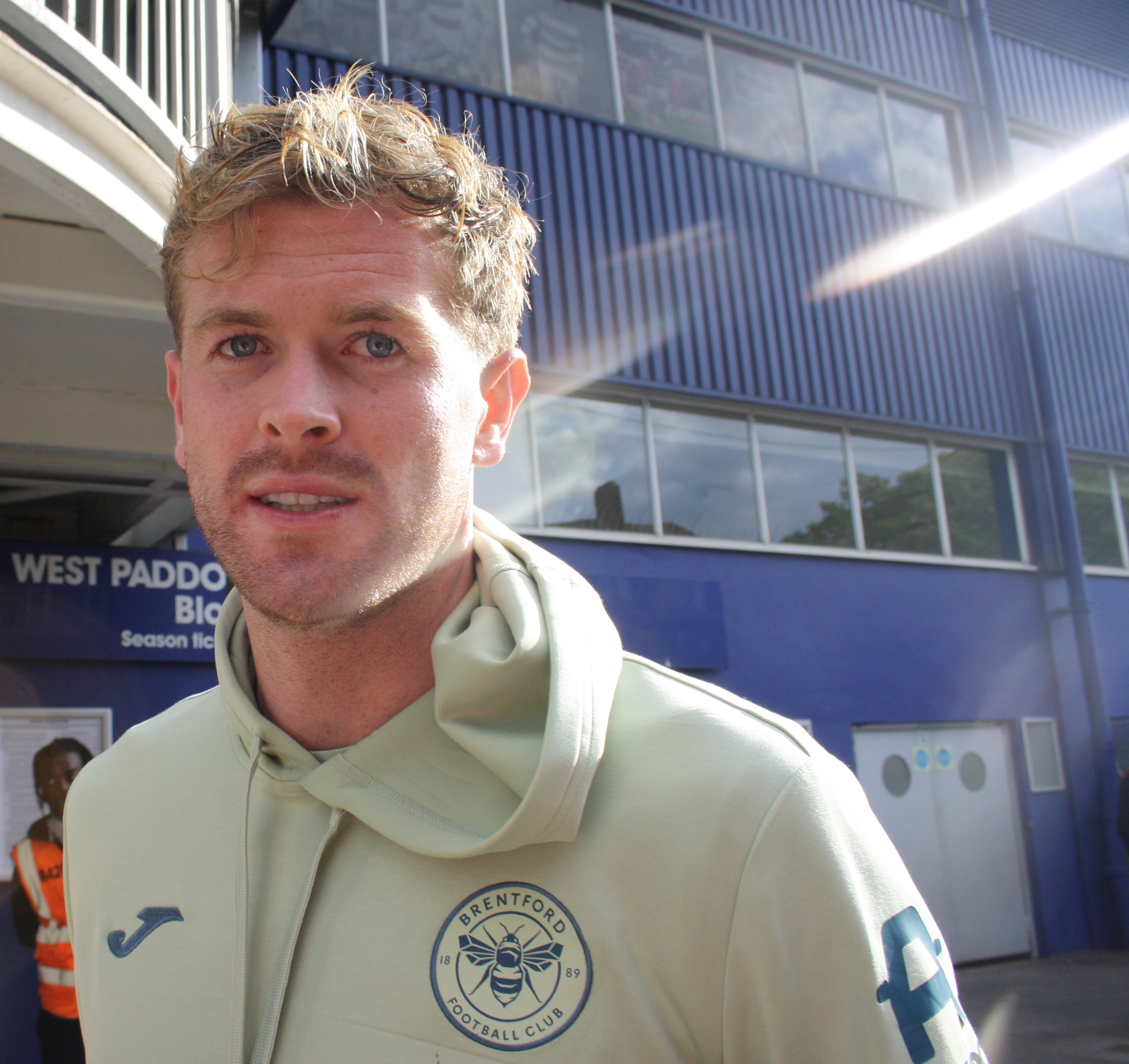
- Collins with Brentford in 2025

Personal information
- Full name: Nathan Michael Collins
- Date of birth: 30 April 2001 (age 25)
- Place of birth: Leixlip, Ireland
- Height: 1.95 m (6 ft 5 in)
- Position: Centre-back

Team information
- Current team: Brentford
- Number: 22

Youth career
- 2006–2016: Cherry Orchard
- 2016–2019: Stoke City

Senior career*
Years	Team	Apps	(Gls)
2019–2021	Stoke City	39	(2)
2021–2022	Burnley	19	(2)
2022–2023	Wolverhampton Wanderers	26	(0)
2023–	Brentford	109	(4)

International career^{‡}
2016–2018	Republic of Ireland U17	19	(0)
2018	Republic of Ireland U19	3	(0)
2019–2020	Republic of Ireland U21	4	(0)
2021–	Republic of Ireland	41	(3)
- * Club domestic league appearances and goals as of 21:48, 14 November 2026 (UTC) ‡ National team caps and goals as of 21:05, 14 November 2026 (UTC)

Nathan Michael Collins (born 30 April 2001) is an Irish professional footballer who plays as a centre-back for and captains both Premier League club Brentford and the Republic of Ireland national team.

Collins began his senior club career at age 17 in 2019 with Stoke City, after coming up through their academy. After playing parts of three years with Stoke in the Championship, he transferred to Burnley in the Premier League. After a season with Burnley in which they were relegated, Collins was signed by Wolverhampton Wanderers for £20.5 million, making him the most expensive Irish player. Following one season with Wolves, Collins signed with Brentford for £23 million, becoming the club's record transfer.

Collins made his senior international debut for Ireland in 2021, and won forty caps since then and has captained the squad since 2025.

== Early life ==
Collins was born in Confey, Leixlip, County Kildare and attended secondary school at Confey College.

== Club career ==
=== Stoke City ===
Collins began his career with youth club Cherry Orchard, where his father David and uncle Eamonn both started their careers. He joined English club Stoke City in January 2016 after being scouted by Tony Bowen, assistant manager Mark Bowen's brother. Collins made his first team debut on 9 April 2019 away at Swansea City. His first start came ten days later when he played the full 90 minutes of Stoke's 1–0 loss away to Middlesbrough at the Riverside Stadium. Collins signed a five-year contract with Stoke City in July 2019.

Collins started the first few matches of the 2019–20 season and was given the captain's armband by Nathan Jones against Leeds United, becoming Stoke's youngest captain in the process. He was sent off for the first time in his career in an EFL Cup defeat at Crawley Town for a mistimed challenge on Panutche Camará. Collins remained on the fringes of the first team for the rest of the season under the management of Michael O'Neill, making a total of 17 appearances in the 2019–20 season. Collins played 27 times in the 2020–21 season before he suffered a season ending foot injury playing against Norwich City on 13 February 2021.

=== Burnley ===
On 24 June 2021, Collins joined the Premier League club Burnley for a £12 million fee, signing a four-year contract with the club. He scored his first two goals for the club in a pair of home game ties during April 2022, against Everton and Southampton. Collins became a key member of Burnley's club in the second half of the 2021–22 season as the team fought against relegation. Burnley were relegated after a 2–1 defeat against Newcastle United on the final day of the season, a game in which Collins gave away a penalty for handball.

=== Wolverhampton Wanderers ===
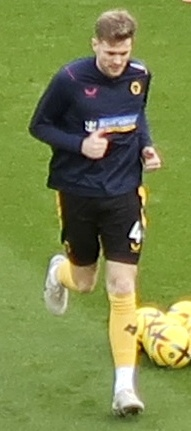
Collins in pre-match training for Wolverhampton Wanderers in 2023.

On 12 July 2022, Collins signed with the Premier League club Wolverhampton Wanderers on a five-year contract for a fee of £20.5 million, an all-time record transfer fee for an Irish player. Collins made his competitive debut in a 2–1 defeat away to Leeds United on the opening weekend of the 2022–23 Premier League season, playing the full 90 minutes in central defensive pairing with Max Kilman.

Collins received a straight red card for a high challenge on Jack Grealish during the first half of the Wolves' home Premier League game against Manchester City on 17 September 2022, resulting in a three-match suspension. The game ended in a 3–0 loss.

=== Brentford ===
On 4 July 2023, Collins signed for Brentford for a club-record £23 million transfer fee, he also broke his own record for most expensive Irish player. Later that year, on 4 November, he scored his first goal in a 3–2 win over West Ham United.

Collins opened his 2024–25 Premier League goals account with the headed opener in his team's 5–3 home victory over Wolves on 5 October 2024, his second league goal for the club. He went on to become the only outfield player in the league to play every minute of the 2024–25 season. Following the departure of club captain Christian Nørgaard at the conclusion of the season, Collins was named the new captain on 2 August 2025.

== International career ==
Collins made his Republic of Ireland U17 debut against Kazakhstan on 17 October 2016 and was later made captain of the team. He made his senior debut on 12 October 2021, coming on as a late substitute in a 4–0 friendly victory against Qatar. On 14 June 2022, Collins scored his first goal for Ireland in a 1–1 draw against Ukraine in the UEFA Nations League.

== Personal life ==
Collins' family includes a number of other footballers, including his grandfather, Michael Collins who captained Transport to the FAI Cup in 1950, his father Dave Collins who played with Liverpool and Oxford United among others. His uncle, Eamonn Collins, played with many sides including Southampton and Portsmouth before going on to manage St Patrick's Athletic and later becoming a football agent. His older brother Josh Collins previously played for UCD and Waterford in the League of Ireland Premier Division. Nathan's uncle Mick Collins played for St Patrick's Athletic and Dundalk before later becoming a scout at Manchester City for 20 years, his son Mikey Collins (Nathan's cousin) is also an ex-footballer who played for Liverpool in his youth career before playing in Sweden, Italy, Cyprus and Holland, as well as representing Ireland up to U21 level. His younger cousin, Brody Collins, is a talented midfielder playing for the academy side of German club Schalke 04 and has been capped at Ireland U17 level.

== Career statistics ==
=== Club ===
As of match played 8 November 2026

Appearances and goals by club, season and competition
Club	Season	League			FA Cup		EFL Cup		Other		Total	
Club	Season	Division	Apps	Goals	Apps	Goals	Apps	Goals	Apps	Goals	Apps	Goals
Stoke City U23	2018–19	—			—		—		2 (Note: Appearances in EFL Trophy)	0	2	0
Stoke City	2018–19	Championship	3	0	0	0	0	0	—		3	0
Stoke City	2019–20	Championship	14	0	1	0	2	0	—		17	0
Stoke City	2020–21	Championship	22	2	1	0	4	0	—		27	2
Stoke City	Total		39	2	2	0	6	0	—		47	2
Burnley	2021–22	Premier League	19	2	0	0	3	0	—		22	2
Wolverhampton Wanderers	2022–23	Premier League	26	0	2	0	3	0	—		31	0
Brentford	2023–24	Premier League	32	1	2	1	1	0	—		35	2
Brentford	2024–25	Premier League	38	2	1	0	3	0	—		42	2
Brentford	2025–26	Premier League	35	1	2	0	4	1	–		41	2
Brentford	2026–27	Premier League	4	0	0	0	2	2	–		6	2
Brentford	Total		109	4	5	1	10	3	—		124	8
Career total			193	8	9	1	22	3	2	0	226	12

=== International ===
As of match played on 14 November 2026

Appearances and goals by national team and year
National team	Year	Apps	Goals
Republic of Ireland	2021	1	0
Republic of Ireland	2022	9	1
Republic of Ireland	2023	8	1
Republic of Ireland	2024	8	0
Republic of Ireland	2025	10	0
Republic of Ireland	2026	5	1
Total		41	3

As of match played on 14 November 2026
Scores and results list Ireland's goal tally first, score column indicates score after each Collins goal

List of international goals scored by Nathan Collins
No.	Date	Venue	Cap	Opponent	Score	Result	Competition
1	14 June 2022	Stadion Miejski ŁKS, Łódź, Poland	6	Ukraine	1–0	1–1	2022–23 UEFA Nations League
2	16 June 2023	Agia Sophia Stadium, Athens, Greece	13	Greece	1–1	1–2	UEFA Euro 2024 qualifying
3	28 May 2026	Aviva Stadium, Dublin, Ireland	39	Qatar	1–0	1–0	Friendly
