= Max Thompson (footballer, born 2002) =

English footballer

Personal information
- Full name: Max Thompson
- Date of birth: 9 February 2002 (age 24)
- Place of birth: Macclesfield, England
- Height: 1.80 m (5 ft 11 in)
- Position: Forward

Team information
- Current team: Warrington Town

Youth career
- 2010–2018: Manchester United
- 2018–2019: Everton
- 2019–2020: Burnley

Senior career*
Years	Team	Apps	(Gls)
2020–2022	Burnley	1	(0)
2022–2023	Sunderland	0	(0)
2024	MFK Skalica	0	(0)
2024–2025	Queen's Park	0	(0)
2025	Chorley	2	(0)
2025	→ Warrington Town (dual reg)		
2025–	Warrington Town		
- * Club domestic league appearances and goals as of 10:53, 13 April 2025 (UTC)

Max Thompson (born 9 February 2002) is an English professional footballer who plays as a forward who plays for Warrington Town.

== Career ==
=== Youth career ===
After interest from other clubs, Thompson ended up signing for Manchester United as an under-9 in 2010. He progressed through the age groups at United but wasn't offered a scholarship and departed the club aged 15. Following his release, Thompson signed for Everton. He spent 18-months at the club, but finding game time at Everton limited, Thompson was allowed to explore other options and he requested to be released from his contract. Following this, he went on trial with Burnley and scored twice in an under-23 friendly and played once for the under-18 side against Nottingham Forest before signing.

=== Professional career ===
During the COVID-19 lockdown, Thompson was invited to train with the first-team bubble and impressed Burnley manager, Sean Dyche, in training. On 22 June 2020, he made his senior debut, coming on as a substitute for Matěj Vydra in Burnley's 5–0 loss to Manchester City at the City of Manchester Stadium.

On 22 July 2022, Thompson joined newly-promoted Championship side Sunderland on a two-year deal for an undisclosed fee. He was initially assigned to the under-21 squad.

In October 2023, Thompson left Sunderland by mutual consent.

In January 2024, Thompson signed for Slovak First Football League side MFK Skalica. He left the club at the end of the season without making an appearance.

On 10 October 2024, Thompson joined Scottish Championship club Queen's Park on a contract until the end of the season with the option for a further year. He left the club at the end of the season after making three appreances in the cup. In August 2025, Thompson joined National League North club Chorley on a short term deal.

After a spell at Warrington Town on dual registration terms, he joined the club on a permanent deal in November 2025.

== Personal life ==
Thompson's brother and father, Warren, also played football, for Blackburn Rovers and York City respectively.

== Career statistics ==
As of match played 22 February 2025

Appearances and goals by club, season and competition
Club	Season	League			National cup		League cup		Other		Total	
Club	Season	Division	Apps	Goals	Apps	Goals	Apps	Goals	Apps	Goals	Apps	Goals
Burnley	2019-20	Premier League	1	0	0	0	0	0	—		1	0
Burnley	2020-21	Premier League	0	0	0	0	0	0	—		0	0
Burnley	Total		1	0	0	0	0	0	—		1	0
MFK Skalica	2023-24	Slovak First League	0	0	0	0	—		—		0	0
Queen's Park	2024-25	Scottish Championship	0	0	1	0	0	0	2 (Note: Appearance(s) in Scottish Challenge Cup)	0	3	0
Career total			1	0	1	0	0	0	2	0	4	0
