= Ben Mee =

English footballer (born 1989)

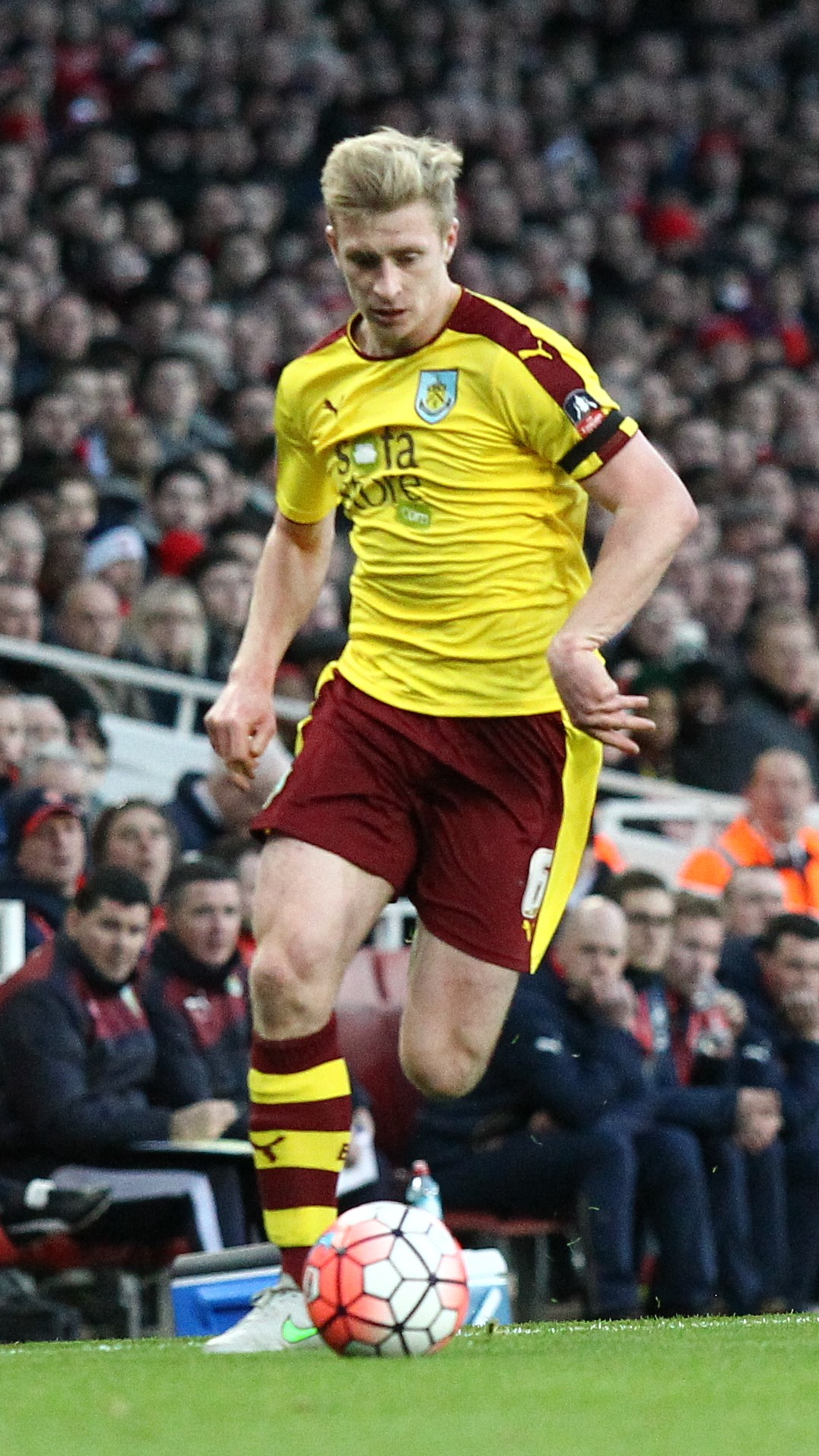
- Mee playing for Burnley in 2016

Personal information
- Full name: Benjamin Thomas Mee
- Date of birth: 21 September 1989 (age 37)
- Place of birth: Sale, England
- Height: 5 ft 11 in (1.80 m)
- Position: Centre-back

Youth career
- –2010: Manchester City

Senior career*
Years	Team	Apps	(Gls)
2010–2012	Manchester City	0	(0)
2011	→ Leicester City (loan)	15	(0)
2011–2012	→ Burnley (loan)	19	(0)
2012–2022	Burnley	332	(12)
2022–2025	Brentford	60	(5)
2025–2026	Sheffield United	15	(0)
Total		441	(17)

International career
2007–2008	England U19	3	(1)
2009	England U20	5	(0)
2010–2011	England U21	2	(0)

Managerial career
- 2022: Burnley (assistant)
- * Club domestic league appearances and goals

Benjamin Thomas Mee (born 21 September 1989) is an English former professional footballer who played as a centre-back. He joined Sky Sports as a guest pundit during the 2025–26 Premier League season.

Starting his career with Manchester City, Mee only played one League Cup match before being loaned out to Leicester City and Burnley, joining the latter on a permanent basis in January 2012. He has made over 300 appearances for them since then. He has also featured for the England youth teams from under-19 to under-21 level.

== Club career ==
=== Manchester City ===
Mee was born in Sale, Greater Manchester. He came through Manchester City's academy and signed his first professional contract with the club in September 2007. He captained the City team that won the 2007–08 FA Youth Cup. In February 2009, he signed a new two-year contract that would keep him at City until July 2011.

Mee was given his first real test of first-team experience when he was taken on City's US tour in the summer of 2010, with club manager Roberto Mancini expressing that he wanted to blood his youth players and have a chance to see what they could do at a higher level than reserve fixtures. Mee made up two appearances, against the Portland Timbers and New York Red Bulls.

After being given number 58 shirt, Mee followed up his tour appearances with a starting line-up appearance in the League Cup against West Bromwich Albion on 22 September 2010 in a 2–1 away loss. Alongside Mee making his debut, Javan Vidal and John Guidetti were given their first competitive appearances for the club in a match where three of the four players in the defensive line were young Elite Development Squad players and a full six of the starting line-up were aged 21 or younger and had come through the club's academy system.

==== Loan to Leicester City ====
On 1 January 2011, Mee joined Championship club Leicester City side on loan for the rest of the 2010–11 season. After signing for the club, Mee would join his Manchester City's teammate Greg Cunningham at Leicester City. After two weeks yet playing them, Mee finally made his debut for Leicester City in a 4–2 win over Millwall. On 12 March 2011, Mee provided his first professional assist for Miguel Vítor to score his first goal in the match against Scunthorpe United which he scored twice later in the match which Leicester City won 3–0. On 25 April 2011, Mee provided his second assist for Jeffrey Bruma to score against Watford in a 4–2 win. After the end of 2010–11 season, Mee returned to Manchester City after a year with the foxes.

=== Burnley ===
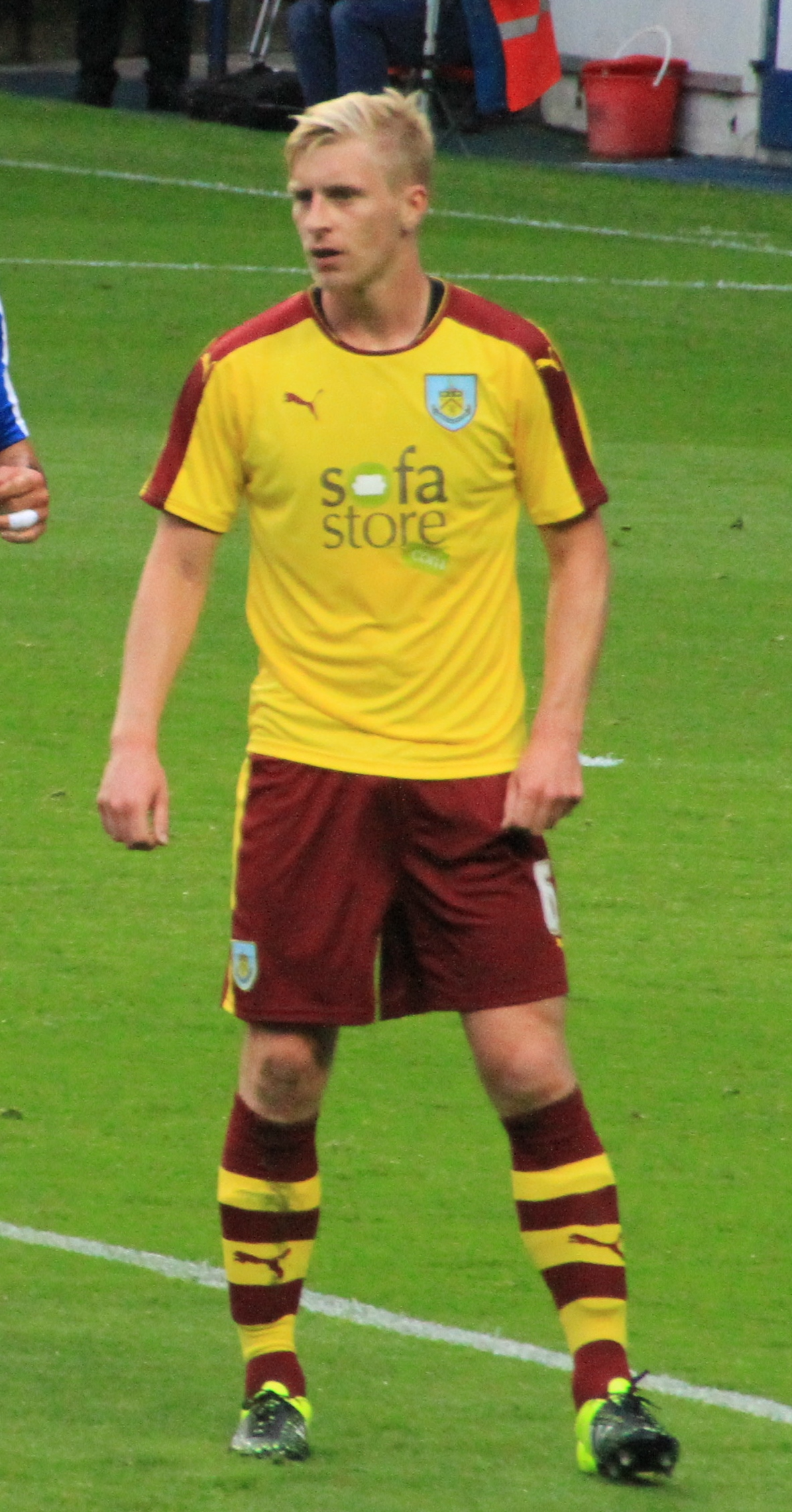
Mee playing for Burnley in 2015

On 14 July 2011, Mee joined Burnley on a season-long loan. He said that his good performance at Burnley could earn him a chance back at parent club Manchester City next year. On 6 August, he made his league debut in a 2–2 draw against Watford and played the full 90 minutes. On 29 November, he earned his first clean sheet for Burnley in a 4–0 win over Ipswich Town.

On 10 January 2012, Burnley boss Eddie Howe expressed interest in signing Mee on a permanent basis with Manchester City sanctioning a sale just days after signing former Manchester City teammate Kieran Trippier who was also on loan at the club. Mee joined on a permanent three-and-a-half-year deal on 17 January for an undisclosed fee. His season ended after suffering a slight back fracture which he sustained during a 5–1 win over Portsmouth. In combination of his loan spell and permanent spell at Burnley, Mee finished his season with 31 appearances.

In the 2012–13 season, Mee started his season when he appeared sporadic at the start until he scored his first goal for the club, in a 2–2 draw against Millwall on 28 September 2012. However soon after, he suffered a knee injury during the Lancashire derby, which kept him out for several weeks. He made his return from injury, on 11 March 2013, as Burnley and Hull City drew 1–1. In the next match six days later, Mee was sent-off after a second bookable offence when Burnley and Blackburn drew 1–1. Soon after that, he continued to be sidelined with injuries, including missing out for the rest of the season.

In the 2013–14 season, Mee sustained a knee injury in a pre-season friendly and made a return, though he missed the first four matches, due to being on the bench. From late December to January, Mee had been absent twice in weeks. Despite the absence, Mee played a vital role as a left-back position, where he helped the club get promoted to Premier League and made 38 appearances.

In the 2014–15 season, Mee signed a three-year contract that would keep him until 2017. He made his first Premier League start of the season in the opening match as a left-back, as Burnley lost 3–1 to Chelsea. He went on to score the late equaliser for Burnley in the reverse fixture at Stamford Bridge against Chelsea to keep the final score 1–1, his goal being the second goal of the season Chelsea conceded from a corner kick.

On 8 August 2018, Mee signed a new three-year deal with Burnley to keep him until June 2021.

In June 2020, Mee earned praise for his response to a banner stating "White Lives Matter" that was flown overhead during a league match against Manchester City, condemning the action and speaking of his desire for equality in football and society. On 29 July 2020, Burnley triggered an option in Mee's contract to extend his stay at Turf Moor until 2022.

Mee, along with Paul Jenkins and Connor King, was appointed an assistant to Mike Jackson on 15 April 2022 after Sean Dyche was dismissed as manager. Burnley announced on 10 June that Mee would leave the club at the end of June when his contract expired.

=== Brentford ===
Mee signed for Premier League club Brentford on 22 July 2022 on a two-year contract. On his home debut, Mee scored his first Brentford goal in a 4–0 win over Manchester United on 13 August, helping the Bees secure their first league victory over United since 1937. In 2023, he won the Brentford Supporters' Player of the Year award ahead of club top scorer, Ivan Toney. In May 2024, he extended his contract with the club for another season.

On 18 May 2025, Brentford announced that Mee would depart the club upon the expiration of his contract on 30 June.

=== Sheffield United ===
On 1 September 2025, Mee joined Championship club Sheffield United on a one-year contract. He made his debut for the club on 27 September in a 1–0 away victory against Oxford United. On 4 May 2026, Mee announced he would be leaving the club and subsequently announced his retirement from professional football two days later.

== International career ==
At the international level, Mee has represented England at under-21 level, making his debut as a substitute in a friendly against Germany.

== Career statistics ==
Appearances and goals by club, season and competition
Club	Season	League			FA Cup		League Cup		Europe		Total	
Club	Season	Division	Apps	Goals	Apps	Goals	Apps	Goals	Apps	Goals	Apps	Goals
Manchester City	2010–11	Premier League	0	0	0	0	1	0	0	0	1	0
Leicester City (loan)	2010–11	Championship	15	0	0	0	—		—		15	0
Burnley	2011–12	Championship	31	0	1	0	3	0	—		35	0
Burnley	2012–13	Championship	19	1	0	0	2	0	—		21	1
Burnley	2013–14	Championship	38	0	0	0	3	0	—		41	0
Burnley	2014–15	Premier League	33	2	2	0	0	0	—		35	2
Burnley	2015–16	Championship	46	2	2	0	1	0	—		49	2
Burnley	2016–17	Premier League	34	1	1	0	0	0	—		35	1
Burnley	2017–18	Premier League	29	0	1	0	0	0	—		30	0
Burnley	2018–19	Premier League	38	0	0	0	1	0	4 (Note: Appearances in UEFA Europa League)	0	43	0
Burnley	2019–20	Premier League	32	1	0	0	0	0	—		32	1
Burnley	2020–21	Premier League	30	2	1	0	0	0	—		31	2
Burnley	2021–22	Premier League	21	3	1	0	2	0	—		24	3
Burnley	Total		351	12	9	0	12	0	4	0	376	12
Brentford	2022–23	Premier League	37	3	1	0	0	0	—		38	3
Brentford	2023–24	Premier League	16	2	1	0	1	0	—		18	2
Brentford	2024–25	Premier League	7	0	0	0	4	0	—		11	0
Brentford	Total		60	5	2	0	5	0	—		67	5
Sheffield United	2025–26	Championship	15	0	1	0	0	0	—		16	0
Career total			441	17	12	0	18	0	4	0	475	17

== Honours ==
Manchester City

- FA Youth Cup: 2007–08

Burnley

- Football League Championship: 2015–16

Individual

- Brentford Supporters' Player of the Year: 2022–23
