= 1950–51 Everton F.C. season =

English football club season

Everton
1950–51 season
- Manager: Cliff Britton
- Ground: Goodison Park
- First Division: 22nd
- FA Cup: Third Round
- Top goalscorer: League: Jimmy McIntosh (11); All: Jimmy McIntosh (11)
Home colours

During the 1950–51 English football season, Everton F.C. competed in the Football League First Division.

== Final league table ==
Pos	Team	Pld	W	D	L	GF	GA	GAv	Pts	Relegation
18	Fulham	42	13	11	18	52	68	0.765	37	
19	Huddersfield Town	42	15	6	21	64	92	0.696	36	
20	Chelsea	42	12	8	22	53	65	0.815	32	
21	Sheffield Wednesday (R)	42	12	8	22	64	83	0.771	32	Relegation to the Second Division
22	Everton (R)	42	12	8	22	48	86	0.558	32	Relegation to the Second Division

Source: World Football
Rules for classification: 1) Points; 2) Goal average; 3) Goals scored
(R) Relegated

== Results ==
Win	Draw	Loss

=== Football League First Division ===
Date	Opponent	Venue	Result	Attendance	Scorers
19 August 1950	Huddersfield Town	H	3–2		
23 August 1950	Middlesbrough	A	0–4		
26 August 1950	Newcastle United	A	1–1		
30 August 1950	Middlesbrough	H	3–2		
2 September 1950	West Bromwich Albion	H	0–3		
9 September 1950	Stoke City	A	0–2		
13 September 1950	Arsenal	H	1–1		
16 September 1950	Liverpool	H	1–3		
23 September 1950	Portsmouth	A	1–5		
30 September 1950	Chelsea	A	1–2		
7 October 1950	Fulham	A	5–1		
14 October 1950	Bolton Wanderers	H	1–1		
21 October 1950	Charlton Athletic	A	1–2		
28 October 1950	Manchester United	H	1–4		
4 November 1950	Blackpool	A	0–1		
11 November 1950	Tottenham Hotspur	H	1–2		
18 November 1950	Wolverhampton Wanderers	A	0–4		
25 November 1950	Sunderland	H	3–1		
2 December 1950	Aston Villa	A	3–3		
9 December 1950	Derby County	H	1–2		
16 December 1950	Huddersfield Town	A	2–1		
23 December 1950	Newcastle United	H	3–1		
25 December 1950	Burnley	H	1–0		
26 December 1950	Burnley	A	1–1		
30 December 1950	West Bromwich Albion	A	1–0		
13 January 1951	Stoke City	H	0–3		
20 January 1951	Liverpool	A	2–0		
3 February 1951	Portsmouth	A	3–6		
17 February 1951	Chelsea	H	3–0		
28 February 1951	Fulham	H	1–0		
3 March 1951	Bolton Wanderers	A	0–2		
10 March 1951	Charlton Athletic	H	0–0		
17 March 1951	Manchester United	A	0–3		
24 March 1951	Blackpool	H	0–2		
26 March 1951	Sheffield Wednesday	H	0–0		
31 March 1951	Tottenham Hotspur	A	0–3		
7 April 1951	Wolverhampton Wanderers	H	1–1		
14 April 1951	Sunderland	A	0–4		
21 April 1951	Aston Villa	H	1–1		
28 April 1951	Derby County	A	1–0		
5 May 1951	Sheffield Wednesday	A	0–6		

=== FA Cup ===
Round	Date	Opponent	Venue	Result	Attendance	Goalscorers
3	6 January 1951	Hull City	A	0–2		
