= Connor King =

English football coach and former player (born 1999)

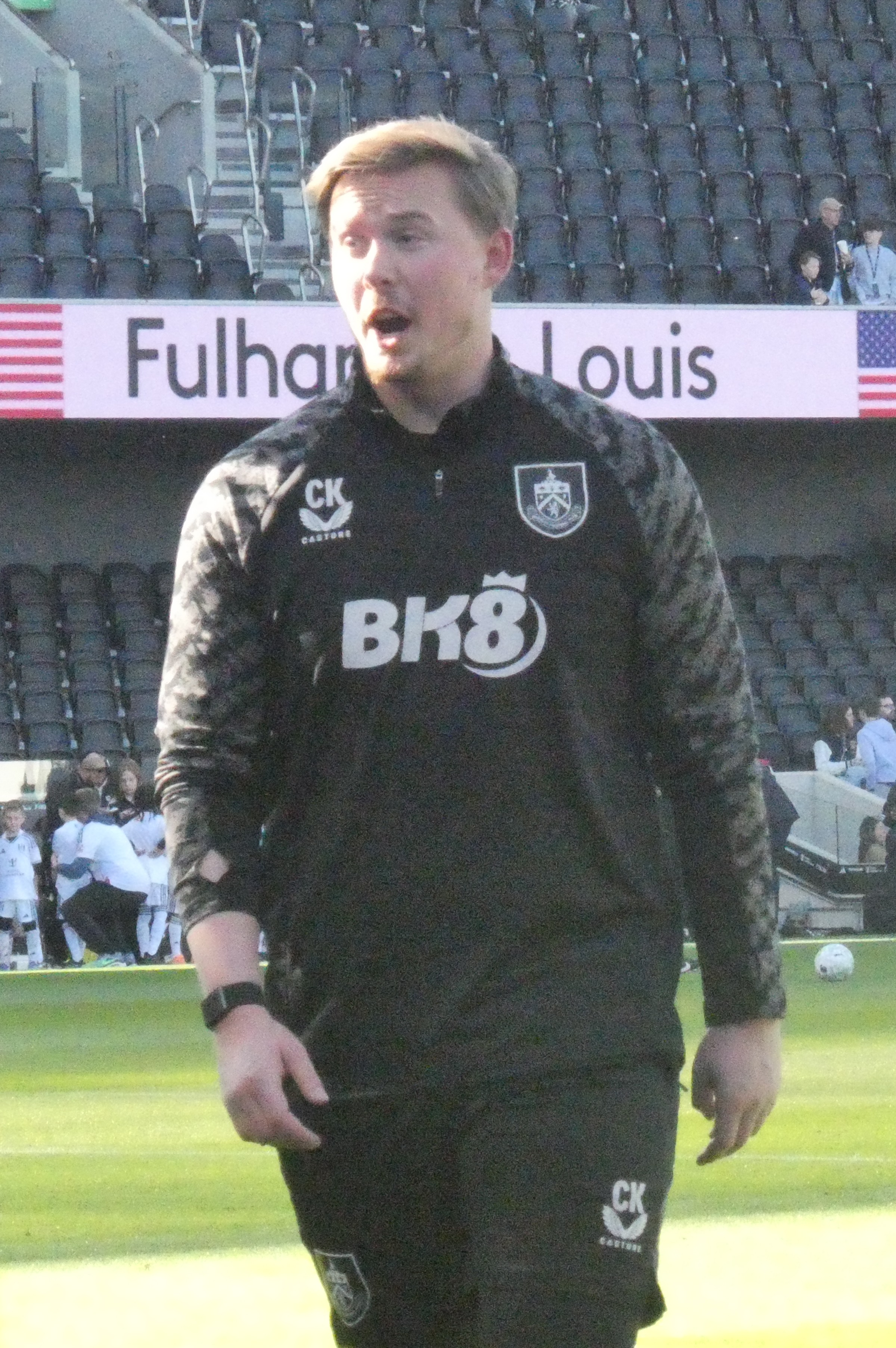
- King in 2026

Personal information
- Full name: Connor Lewis King
- Date of birth: 27 April 1999 (age 27)
- Position: Goalkeeper

Team information
- Current team: Manchester United (Assistant goalkeeping coach)

Youth career
- 2010–2018: Burnley

Senior career*
Years	Team	Apps	(Gls)
2017–2018	Burnley	0	(0)
2017–2018	→ Barnoldswick Town (loan)		
2018–2019	Chester	0	(0)
2019–2020	Clitheroe	16	(0)

International career
2013–2016	England U16	2	(0)
- * Club domestic league appearances and goals

Connor Lewis King (born 27 April 1999) is an English football coach and former player. He is an assistant goalkeeper coach at Premier League club Manchester United.

As a player, King was part of the youth academy at Burnley and later played at non-League level for Barnoldswick Town, Chester and Clitheroe. He is a former England under-16 international.

== Club career ==
King came through the Burnley academy as a goalkeeper playing for the club from the age of 11 and progressing up until the under-23 team.

On 10 July 2017, he joined non-league side Barnoldswick Town on loan. On 5 January 2018, King returned to Turf Moor with Town manager Danny Craig heaping praise on the player, "I think he has been one of the best keepers in the league and if you could bottle his attitude you would make a fortune. The next move he makes should be three or four levels higher up than us because he is that good. He has probably been our best passer of the ball and he is a huge talent.

On 31 August 2018, King signed for National League North side Chester, following his release from Burnley.

He later had a spell with Clitheroe, where he made sixteen appearances.

== International career ==
King was called up to the England U16 team in 2013, and was an unused substitute in the victory shield win over Wales in Kidderminster. He would eventually win several caps.

== Coaching career ==
King holds a UEFA B license in coaching football, he also had a B license in goalkeeping coaching. On 21 August 2021, King was appointed as the clubs transition goalkeeping coach, replacing Fabian Otte. King had been at the club as a part-time academy coach since retiring from football in 2020.

King, along with Paul Jenkins and Ben Mee, was appointed an assistant to caretaker manager Mike Jackson on 15 April 2022 after Sean Dyche was dismissed as Burnley manager.

In September 2026, King joined the backroom staff at Manchester United as an assistant goalkeeper coach
