= Arman Taranis =

Danish footballer (born 2001)

Personal information
- Date of birth: 30 July 2001 (age 25)
- Place of birth: Lind, Denmark
- Height: 1.80 m (5 ft 11 in)
- Position: Forward

Team information
- Current team: Degerfors IF
- Number: 17

Youth career
- SFGIF
- Herning Fremad
- –2017: Midtjylland
- 2017–2020: SønderjyskE
- 2020–2021: Burnley

Senior career*
| Years | Team | Apps | (Gls) |
| 2020 | SønderjyskE | 3 | (0) |
| 2021 | Ringkøbing | | |
| 2022–2023 | KLG | | |
| 2023 | Herning Fremad | 13 | (12) |
| 2024–2025 | FC Roskilde | 46 | (13) |
| 2025– | Degerfors IF | 19 | (3) |

International career
| 2019 | Denmark U19 | 4 | (2) |
- * Club domestic league appearances and goals as of 8 July 2026

Arman Taranis (born 30 July 2001) is a Danish footballer of Bosnian descent, who plays as a forward for Allsvenskan club Degerfors IF.

== Club career ==
=== SønderjyskE ===
Taranis started playing at Felding Gymnastik og Idrætsforening (SFGIF). After a spells at Herning Fremad and at FC Midtjylland which he joined as a U14 player, Taranis moved to SønderjyskE in the summer 2017 as a U17 player. On 31 March 2017, 15-year old Taranis signed his first three-year youth contract with SønderjyskE.

Taranis got his official debut for SønderjyskE on 5 September 2019, when he played 49 minutes against BK Viktoria in the Danish Cup. His debut in the Danish Superliga came on 8 July 2020 against Lyngby BK. On the following day, he was permanently promoted to the first team squad, signing a new professional deal with SønderjyskE for the rest of 2020. However, on the last day of the 2020-21 summer transfer market, Taranis' contract was terminated by mutual consent.

=== Burnley ===
After leaving SønderjyskE, Taranis began training with Tjørring IF, where his uncle also was playing. However, as a free agent, Taranis got contacted by Burnley after being spotted during a game for the Denmark U19 against Ireland and after a short trial spell, where he also played a friendly game against Preston North End, he signed a deal until the summer 2022 on 20 November 2020 and was registered for the U23 team.

In March, Taranis landed unlucky and broke the collarbone during a training session, keeping him out for the rest of the season. In May 2021 it was announced that Taranis would be leaving the club a year before his contract expired.

=== Lower series clubs ===
On 1 October 2021, Taranis returned to Denmark, signing with Denmark Series club Ringkøbing IF. He made his debut the following day, coming on as a substitute in a 2–1 away victory against Kjellerup IF.

It was a short stay in Ringkøbing before moving to KLG Fodbold in 2022.

=== FC Roskilde ===
On 1 February 2024, Taranis joined Danish 2nd Division side FC Roskilde. With two goals in 16 appearances, Taranis contributed to Roskilde's promotion to the 2024-25 Danish 1st Division.

In early February 2025, it emerged in the media that Roskilde had allowed Taranis to travel to Portugal as a move to Boavista was in the works. However, the club had a transfer ban in place, which both parties hoped would be lifted before the transfer deadline. When that didn't happen, the deal fell through.

=== Degerfors IF ===
On 14 August 2025 it was confirmed, that Taranis had been sold to Swedish club Degerfors IF, signing a deal until the end of 2028.

== International career ==
In October 2019, Taranis was called up for the Denmark U19. He played the two friendly games against Ireland U19 in October, scoring two goals in the last of the two games, and also played two games in the 2020 UEFA European Under-19 Championship qualification in November 2019.
