= 2021–22 FA Cup =

Football Association Challenge Cup
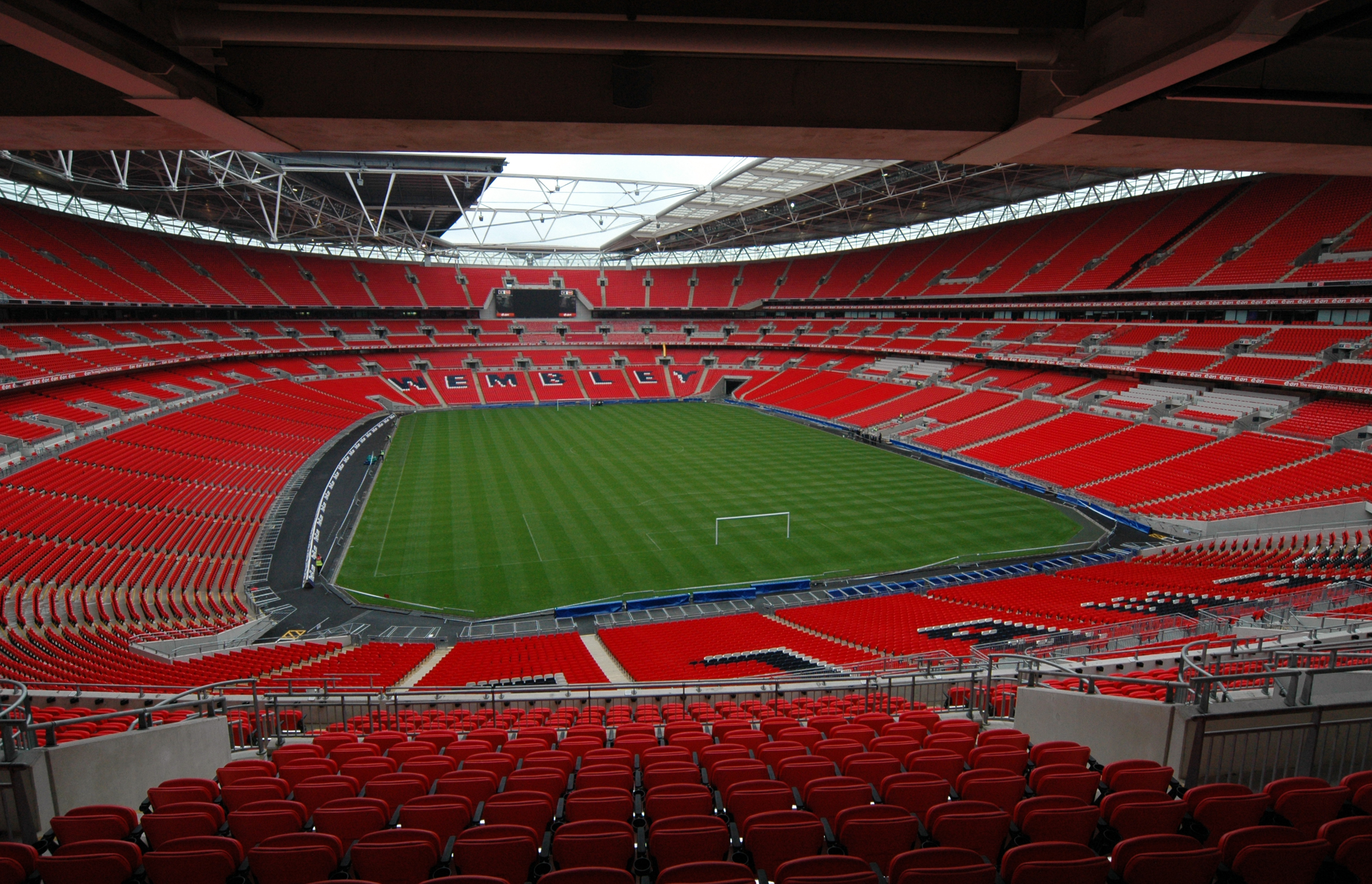
- Wembley Stadium hosted the final on 14 May 2022

Tournament details
- Country: England; Wales; Jersey
- Dates: 6 August 2021 – 14 May 2022
- Teams: 729 (all); 637 (qualifying competition); 124 (main competition)

Final positions
- Champions: Liverpool (8th title)
- Runners-up: Chelsea

Tournament statistics
- Matches played: 108
- Goals scored: 328 (3.04 per match)
- Attendance: 1,622,895 (15,027 per match)
- Top goal scorer: Adam Boyes (11 goals)

The 2021–22 FA Cup was the 141st season and marked the 150th anniversary of the first Football Association Challenge Cup, the oldest football tournament in the world, started in the 1871–72 season. It was sponsored by Emirates and was known as the Emirates FA Cup for sponsorship purposes.

Premier League side Leicester City were the holders, having beaten Chelsea in the 2021 final. They were eliminated by Nottingham Forest in the fourth round.

Liverpool beat the two-time defending runners-up Chelsea on penalties in the final to win their eighth FA Cup overall and first since 2006. This was the fifth FA Cup final that went to extra time, with Chelsea becoming the first team to lose three consecutive finals. As winners, Liverpool would have qualified for the 2022–23 UEFA Europa League group stage; however, as they had already qualified for the Champions League via the league standings, the spot was passed down to the 6th-placed Premier League team.

== Teams ==
The FA Cup is a knockout competition with 124 teams taking part (excluding those eliminated in the qualifying rounds) all trying to reach the Final at Wembley in May 2022. The competitors consist of the 92 teams from the Football League system (20 teams from the Premier League and the 72 in total from the EFL Championship, EFL League One and EFL League Two) plus the 32 surviving teams out of 637 teams from the National League System (levels 5–10 of the English football league system) that started the competition in qualifying rounds.

All rounds are drawn randomly, usually either at the completion of the previous round or on the evening of the last televised game of a round being played, depending on television broadcasting rights.

| Round | Main date | Number of fixtures | Clubs remaining | New entries this round | Winner prize money | Loser prize money | Divisions entering this round |
|---|---|---|---|---|---|---|---|
| First round proper | Saturday 6 November 2021 | 40 | 124 → 84 | 48 | £22,629 | None | 24 EFL League One teams 24 EFL League Two teams |
| Second round proper | Saturday 4 December 2021 | 20 | 84 → 64 | None | £32,000 | None | None |
| Third round proper | Saturday 8 January 2022 | 32 | 64 → 32 | 44 | £82,000 | None | 20 Premier League teams 24 EFL Championship teams |
| Fourth round proper | Saturday 5 February 2022 | 16 | 32 → 16 | None | £90,000 | None | None |
| Fifth round proper | Wednesday 2 March 2022 | 8 | 16 → 8 | None | £180,000 | None | None |
| Quarter-finals | Saturday 19 March 2022 | 4 | 8 → 4 | None | £360,000 | None | None |
| Semi-finals | Saturday 16 April 2022 | 2 | 4 → 2 | None | £900,000 | £450,000 | None |
| Final | Saturday 14 May 2022 | 1 | 2 → 1 | None | £1,800,000 | £900,000 | None |

== Qualifying ==
All participating clubs that were not members of the Premier League or English Football League competed in the qualifying rounds to secure one of 32 available places in the first round proper. The six-round qualifying competition began with the extra preliminary round on 6 August 2021, with the fourth and final qualifying round being played on the weekend of 16 October.

The winners from the fourth qualifying round were Wrexham, Gateshead, Chesterfield, Solihull Moors, Guiseley, FC Halifax Town, York City, Buxton, Stratford Town, King's Lynn Town, Grimsby Town, Stockport County, Altrincham, Notts County, Ebbsfleet United, Horsham, St Albans City, Maidenhead United, Hayes & Yeading United, Kidderminster Harriers, Bromley, Harrow Borough, Dagenham & Redbridge, AFC Sudbury, Banbury United, Yeovil Town, Eastleigh, Boreham Wood, Havant & Waterlooville, Southend United, Yate Town and Bowers & Pitsea.

Stratford Town and Bowers & Pitsea were appearing in the competition proper for the first time. Of the others, Yate Town had last featured at this stage in 2012–13, Horsham had last done so in 2007-08, AFC Sudbury had last done so in 2000-01 and Buxton had last done so in 1962-63.

== First round proper ==
The first round saw the 32 winners from the fourth qualifying round joined by the 48 clubs from League One and League Two. The draw was held on 17 October 2021 at Wembley Stadium, and was done by Kelly Smith and Wes Morgan. The lowest-ranked team in the first round were AFC Sudbury of the eighth-tier Isthmian League North Division.

Number of teams per tier still in competition
| Premier League (Note: Premier League and Championship teams joined the competition in the third round.) | Championship | League One | League Two | Non-League | Total |
|---|---|---|---|---|---|
| 20 / 20 | 24 / 24 | 24 / 24 | 24 / 24 | 32 / 32 | 124 / 124 |

| 5 November 2021 | AFC Sudbury (8) | 0–4 | Colchester United (4) | Sudbury |
| 19:55 GMT | | Report | Sarpong-Wiredu 35'; Sears 39'; Jasper 71'; McCoulsky 90+3' | Stadium: King's Marsh; Attendance: 2,000; Referee: James Bell |

| 6 November 2021 | Scunthorpe United (4) | 0–1 | Doncaster Rovers (3) | Scunthorpe |
| 13:00 GMT | | Report | Loft 38' (o.g.) | Stadium: Glanford Park; Attendance: 3,301; Referee: Carl Boyeson |

| 6 November 2021 | Gillingham (3) | 1–1 | Cheltenham Town (3) | Gillingham |
| 14:00 GMT | Sithole 59' | Report | Pollock 34' | Stadium: Priestfield Stadium; Attendance: 2,555; Referee: Ollie Yates |

| 16 November 2021 Replay | Cheltenham Town (3) | 1–0 | Gillingham (3) | Cheltenham |
| 19:45 GMT | Pollock 11' | Report | | Stadium: Whaddon Road; Attendance: 2,651; Referee: Lee Swabey |

| 6 November 2021 | Bradford City (4) | 1–1 | Exeter City (4) | Bradford |
| 15:00 GMT | Robinson 28' | Report | Nombe 86' | Stadium: Valley Parade; Attendance: 3,236; Referee: Seb Stockbridge |

| 16 November 2021 Replay | Exeter City (4)* | Void | Bradford City (4) | Exeter |
| 19:45 GMT | Jay 100', 115'; Atangana 105' | Report | | Stadium: St James Park; Attendance: 3,509 |
Note: Declared void after Exeter City fielded a sixth substitute.

| 30 November 2021 Replay | Exeter City (4) | 2–1 | Bradford City (4) | Exeter |
| 19:45 GMT | Dieng 51'; Ray 80' | Report | Angol 11' | Stadium: St James Park; Attendance: 3,228; Referee: Charles Breakspear |

| 6 November 2021 | Sunderland (3) | 0–1 | Mansfield Town (4) | Sunderland |
| 15:00 GMT | | Report | Oates 5' | Stadium: Stadium of Light; Attendance: 8,620; Referee: James Oldham |

| 6 November 2021 | Hayes & Yeading United (7) | 0–1 | Sutton United (4) | Hayes |
| 15:00 GMT | | Report | Randall 71' | Stadium: Skyex Stadium; Attendance: 1,201; Referee: Sam Allison |

| 6 November 2021 | Carlisle United (4) | 2–0 | Horsham (7) | Carlisle |
| 15:00 GMT | Young 69'; Clough 90' | Report | | Stadium: Brunton Park; Attendance: 2,581; Referee: Lewis Smith |

| 6 November 2021 | Yate Town (7) | 0–5 | Yeovil Town (5) | Yate |
| 15:00 GMT | | Report | Robinson 7'; Wakefield 14'; Gorman 29' (pen.); Yussuf 48'; Lo-Everton 62' | Stadium: Lodge Road; Attendance: 1,600; Referee: Matthew Russell |

| 6 November 2021 | Rotherham United (3) | 3–0 | Bromley (5) | Rotherham |
| 15:00 GMT | Wiles 43'; Ladapo 45+2'; Grigg 80' | Report | | Stadium: New York Stadium; Attendance: 4,064; Referee: Declan Bourne |

| 6 November 2021 | Portsmouth (3) | 1–0 | Harrow Borough (7) | Portsmouth |
| 15:00 GMT | Harness 28' | Report | | Stadium: Fratton Park; Attendance: 6,869; Referee: Scott Tallis |

| 6 November 2021 | Morecambe (3) | 1–0 | Newport County (4) | Morecambe |
| 15:00 GMT | Wildig 68' | Report | | Stadium: Globe Arena; Attendance: 1,879; Referee: Chris Sarginson |

| 6 November 2021 | Fleetwood Town (3) | 1–2 | Burton Albion (3) | Fleetwood |
| 15:00 GMT | J. Garner 12' | Report | Powell 14'; Jebbison 77' | Stadium: Highbury Stadium; Attendance: 1,362; Referee: Tom Reeves |

| 6 November 2021 | Northampton Town (4) | 2–2 | Cambridge United (3) | Northampton |
| 15:00 GMT | Etete 6'; Lewis 35' | Report | Smith 14'; Masterson 66' | Stadium: Sixfields Stadium; Attendance: 3,792; Referee: Martin Coy |

| 16 November 2021 Replay | Cambridge United (3) | 3–1 | Northampton Town (4) | Cambridge |
| 19:45 GMT | Knibbs 13'; Smith 40'; Worman 48' | Report | Rose 75' | Stadium: Abbey Stadium; Attendance: 3,068; Referee: Darren Drysdale |

| 6 November 2021 | FC Halifax Town (5) | 7–4 | Maidenhead United (5) | Halifax |
| 15:00 GMT | Warren 10'; Warburton 17'; Spence 37'; Waters 42', 59'; Slew 56'; Newby 73' | Report | Kelly 13', 61'; Acquah 20', 44' | Stadium: The Shay; Attendance: 1,514; Referee: Jacob Miles |

| 6 November 2021 | Chesterfield (5) | 3–1 | Southend United (5) | Chesterfield |
| 15:00 GMT | Khan 6'; Croll 14'; Tshimanga 79' | Report | Murphy 4' | Stadium: Technique Stadium; Attendance: 4,713; Referee: Scott Simpson |

| 6 November 2021 | Kidderminster Harriers (6) | 1–0 | Grimsby Town (5) | Kidderminster |
| 15:00 GMT | Hemmings 72' (pen.) | Report | | Stadium: Aggborough Stadium; Attendance: 2,791; Referee: Gareth Rhodes |

| 6 November 2021 | Wigan Athletic (3) | 0–0 | Solihull Moors (5) | Wigan |
| 15:00 GMT | | Report | | Stadium: DW Stadium; Attendance: 2,843; Referee: Daniel Middleton |

| 16 November 2021 Replay | Solihull Moors (5) | 1–2 (a.e.t.) | Wigan Athletic (3) | Solihull |
| 19:45 GMT | Rooney 48' (pen.) | Report | Kerr 66'; Lang 104' | Stadium: Damson Park; Attendance: 3,703; Referee: Charles Breakspear |

| 6 November 2021 | Boreham Wood (5) | 2–0 | Eastleigh (5) | Borehamwood |
| 15:00 GMT | Boden 45+1', 61' | Report | | Stadium: Meadow Park; Attendance: 931; Referee: Sunny Sukhvir Gill |

| 6 November 2021 | York City (6) | 0–1 | Buxton (7) | York |
| 15:00 GMT | | Report | De Girolamo 85' | Stadium: York Community Stadium; Attendance: 3,791; Referee: Aaron Jackson |

| 6 November 2021 | Ipswich Town (3) | 1–1 | Oldham Athletic (4) | Ipswich |
| 15:00 GMT | Burns 8' | Report | Keillor-Dunn 41' | Stadium: Portman Road; Attendance: 8,845; Referee: Neil Hair |

| 16 November 2021 Replay | Oldham Athletic (4) | 1–2 | Ipswich Town (3) | Oldham |
| 19:45 GMT | McGahey 29' | Report | Chaplin 36'; El Mizouni 81' | Stadium: Boundary Park; Attendance: 2,801; Referee: Carl Boyeson |

| 6 November 2021 | AFC Wimbledon (3) | 1–0 | Guiseley (6) | Wimbledon |
| 15:00 GMT | Palmer 44' | Report | | Stadium: Plough Lane; Attendance: 4,973; Referee: Martin Woods |

| 6 November 2021 | Harrogate Town (4) | 2–1 | Wrexham (5) | Harrogate |
| 15:00 GMT | Power 73'; Orsi 78' | Report | Ponticelli 38' | Stadium: Wetherby Road; Attendance: 2,403; Referee: Scott Oldham |

| 6 November 2021 | Hartlepool United (4) | 2–2 | Wycombe Wanderers (3) | Hartlepool |
| 15:00 GMT | Cullen 45+1'; Molyneux 65' | Report | Forino-Joseph 63'; Jacobson 74' (pen.) | Stadium: Victoria Park; Attendance: 4,271; Referee: Darren Drysdale |

| 16 November 2021 Replay | Wycombe Wanderers (3) | 0–1 | Hartlepool United (4) | High Wycombe |
| 19:45 GMT | | Report | Cullen 20' | Stadium: Adams Park; Attendance: 1,582; Referee: Christopher Pollard |

| 6 November 2021 | King's Lynn Town (5) | 0–1 | Walsall (4) | King's Lynn |
| 15:00 GMT | | Report | Kiernan 15' | Stadium: The Walks; Attendance: 1,934; Referee: Robert Lewis |

| 6 November 2021 | Crewe Alexandra (3) | 0–3 | Swindon Town (4) | Crewe |
| 15:00 GMT | | Report | Reed 25', 79'; Simpson 52' | Stadium: Gresty Road; Attendance: 2,303; Referee: Trevor Kettle |

| 6 November 2021 | Charlton Athletic (3) | 4–0 | Havant & Waterlooville (6) | Charlton |
| 15:00 GMT | Davison 72'; Stockley 76' (pen.), 85'; Burstow 90' | Report | | Stadium: The Valley; Attendance: 3,865; Referee: Carl Brook |

| 6 November 2021 | Crawley Town (4) | 0–1 | Tranmere Rovers (4) | Crawley |
| 15:00 GMT | | Report | McManaman 38' | Stadium: Broadfield Stadium; Attendance: 1,765; Referee: Charles Breakspear |

| 6 November 2021 | Leyton Orient (4) | 1–0 | Ebbsfleet United (6) | Leyton |
| 15:00 GMT | Drinan 24' | Report | | Stadium: Brisbane Road; Attendance: 3,451; Referee: Will Finnie |

| 6 November 2021 | Milton Keynes Dons (3) | 2–2 | Stevenage (4) | Milton Keynes |
| 15:00 GMT | Darling 34'; Watters 76' | Report | Barry 70'; List 73' | Stadium: Stadium MK; Attendance: 2,860; Referee: Simon Mather |

| 16 November 2021 Replay | Stevenage (4) | 2–1 (a.e.t.) | Milton Keynes Dons (3) | Stevenage |
| 19:45 GMT | Reid 61'; Norris 120+1' (pen.) | Report | Darling 37' | Stadium: Broadhall Way; Attendance: 1,876; Referee: Alan Young |

| 6 November 2021 | Lincoln City (3) | 1–0 | Bowers & Pitsea (7) | Lincoln |
| 15:00 GMT | Sanders 66' | Report | | Stadium: Sincil Bank; Attendance: 5,800; Referee: Marc Edwards |

| 6 November 2021 | Port Vale (4) | 5–1 | Accrington Stanley (3) | Stoke-on-Trent |
| 15:00 GMT | Wilson 30', 73', 79'; Cass 85'; Lloyd 90+3' | Report | Hamilton 85' | Stadium: Vale Park; Attendance: 4,605; Referee: Ben Speedie |

| 6 November 2021 | Gateshead (6) | 2–2 | Altrincham (5) | Gateshead |
| 15:00 GMT | Campbell 47'; Olley 79' | Report | Dinanga 83'; Moult 90+5' | Stadium: International Stadium; Attendance: 1,066; Referee: Thomas Parsons |

| 16 November 2021 Replay | Altrincham (5) | 2–3 | Gateshead (6) | Altrincham |
| 19:45 GMT | Hancock 30'; Mooney 79' | Report | Langstaff 22', 90+1'; Ward 57' | Stadium: Moss Lane; Attendance: 1,390; Referee: Martin Woods |

| 6 November 2021 | Banbury United (7) | 0–4 | Barrow (4) | Banbury |
| 17:15 GMT | | Report | Gordon 8'; Zanzala 55'; Banks 80' (pen.); Stevens 83' | Stadium: Spencer Stadium; Attendance: 2,400; Referee: Rebecca Welch |

| 7 November 2021 | Sheffield Wednesday (3) | 0–0 | Plymouth Argyle (3) | Sheffield |
| 12:15 GMT | | Report | | Stadium: Hillsborough Stadium; Attendance: 7,261; Referee: Anthony Backhouse |

| 16 November 2021 Replay | Plymouth Argyle (3) | 3–0 | Sheffield Wednesday (3) | Plymouth |
| 19:45 GMT | Garrick 20', 67'; Hardie 36' | Report | | Stadium: Home Park; Attendance: 11,094; Referee: Chris Sarginson |

| 7 November 2021 | Oxford United (3) | 2–2 | Bristol Rovers (4) | Oxford |
| 13:00 GMT | Taylor 11'; McGuane 51' | Report | Finley 45+1'; Evans 87' (pen.) | Stadium: Kassam Stadium; Attendance: 5,083; Referee: Paul Howard |

| 16 November 2021 Replay | Bristol Rovers (4) | 4–3 (a.e.t.) | Oxford United (3) | Bristol |
| 19:00 GMT | Finley 48'; Spence 110', 118'; Collins 115' | Report | Taylor 57' (pen.); Bodin 91'; Seddon 93' | Stadium: Memorial Stadium; Attendance: 4,918; Referee: Neil Hair |

| 7 November 2021 | Stratford Town (7) | 1–5 | Shrewsbury Town (3) | Tiddington |
| 15:00 GMT | Grocott 5' | Report | Bowman 25', 54'; Leahy 57'; Bennett 62'; Bloxham 90+2' | Stadium: Knights Lane; Attendance: 2,800; Referee: Ben Toner |

| 7 November 2021 | Rochdale (4) | 1–1 | Notts County (5) | Rochdale |
| 15:00 GMT | O'Keeffe 45' | Report | Wootton 62' | Stadium: Spotland Stadium; Attendance: 2,587; Referee: Ross Joyce |

| 16 November 2021 Replay | Notts County (5) | 1–2 | Rochdale (4) | Nottingham |
| 19:45 GMT | White 63' (o.g.) | Report | Andrews 15'; Beesley 90' | Stadium: Meadow Lane; Attendance: 4,416; Referee: James Bell |

| 7 November 2021 | Bolton Wanderers (3) | 2–2 | Stockport County (5) | Horwich |
| 15:00 GMT | Doyle 33'; Kachunga 36' | Report | Quigley 23'; Whitfield 45+2' | Stadium: University of Bolton Stadium; Attendance: 11,183; Referee: Tom Nield |

| 17 November 2021 Replay | Stockport County (5) | 5–3 (a.e.t.) | Bolton Wanderers (3) | Stockport |
| 19:45 GMT | Madden 24' (pen.); Quigley 45', 95'; Palmer 85'; Crankshaw 119' | Report | Kachunga 2'; Palmer 6' (o.g.); Bakayoko 28' | Stadium: Edgeley Park; Attendance: 10,084; Referee: Sam Barrott |

| 7 November 2021 | St Albans City (6) | 3–2 | Forest Green Rovers (4) | St Albans |
| 17:15 GMT | Weiss 25'; Banton 29'; Jeffers 78' | Report | Stevens 18'; Aitchison 45+1' | Stadium: Clarence Park; Attendance: 4,100; Referee: Bobby Madley |

| 8 November 2021 | Dagenham & Redbridge (5) | 0–1 | Salford City (4) | Dagenham |
| 19:45 GMT | | Report | Turnbull 3' | Stadium: Victoria Road; Attendance: 2,330; Referee: David Rock |

== Second round proper ==
The second round featured the 40 winners from the first round. The draw was held on 8 November 2021 at Wembley Stadium, and was done by Shaun Wright-Phillips and Rachel Yankey. The lowest-ranked team in the second round were Buxton of the seventh-tier Northern Premier League Premier Division.

Number of teams per tier still in competition
| Premier League (Note: Premier League and Championship teams joined the competition in the third round.) | Championship | League One | League Two | Non-League | Total |
|---|---|---|---|---|---|
| 20 / 20 | 24 / 24 | 15 / 24 | 18 / 24 | 7 / 32 | 84 / 124 |

| 3 December 2021 | Gateshead (6) | 0–2 | Charlton Athletic (3) | Gateshead |
| 19:45 GMT | | Report | Stockley 30', 54' | Stadium: Gateshead International Stadium; Attendance: 3,746; Referee: Tom Reeves |

| 3 December 2021 | Rotherham United (3) | 1–0 | Stockport County (5) | Rotherham |
| 19:45 GMT | Smith 43' | Report | | Stadium: New York Stadium; Attendance: 6,466; Referee: Ollie Yates |

| 4 December 2021 | Buxton (7) | 0–1 | Morecambe (3) | Buxton |
| 12:45 GMT | | Report | Stockton 29' | Stadium: The Silverlands; Attendance: 3,642; Referee: Lee Swabey |

| 4 December 2021 | Bristol Rovers (4) | 2–1 | Sutton United (4) | Bristol |
| 15:00 GMT | Collins 57' (pen.); Anderton 60' | Report | Randall 52' | Stadium: Memorial Stadium; Attendance: 4,456; Referee: Darren Drysdale |

| 4 December 2021 | Burton Albion (3) | 1–2 | Port Vale (4) | Burton upon Trent |
| 15:00 GMT | Leak 23' | Report | Politic 79', 82' | Stadium: Pirelli Stadium; Attendance: 3,539; Referee: Martin Coy |

| 4 December 2021 | Lincoln City (3) | 0–1 | Hartlepool United (4) | Lincoln |
| 15:00 GMT | | Report | Fiorini 52' (o.g.) | Stadium: Sincil Bank; Attendance: 5,506; Referee: Madley |

| 4 December 2021 | AFC Wimbledon (3) | 4–3 | Cheltenham Town (3) | Wimbledon |
| 15:00 GMT | Assal 36', 55'; Palmer 41', 65' | Report | May 2'; Williams 73'; Heneghan 81' (o.g.) | Stadium: Plough Lane; Attendance: 4,322; Referee: Alan Young |

| 4 December 2021 | Leyton Orient (4) | 4–0 | Tranmere Rovers (4) | Leyton |
| 15:00 GMT | Smith 22', 83'; Beckles 36'; Drinan 60' (pen.) | Report | | Stadium: The Breyer Group Stadium; Attendance: 3,248; Referee: James Oldham |

| 4 December 2021 | Cambridge United (3) | 2–1 | Exeter City (4) | Cambridge |
| 15:00 GMT | May 23'; Knibbs 88' | Report | Nombe 10' (pen.) | Stadium: Abbey Stadium; Attendance: 2,834; Referee: David Rock |

| 4 December 2021 | Doncaster Rovers (3) | 2–3 | Mansfield Town (4) | Doncaster |
| 15:00 GMT | Horton 7'; Rowe 84' | Report | Will Forrester 48'; Lapslie 60', 71' | Stadium: Keepmoat Stadium; Attendance: 7,040; Referee: Seb Stockbridge |

| 4 December 2021 | Walsall (4) | 1–2 | Swindon Town (4) | Walsall |
| 15:00 GMT | Osadebe 37' | Report | Simpson 16'; Hayden 67' | Stadium: Banks's Stadium; Attendance: 4,331; Referee: Peter Wright |

| 4 December 2021 | Carlisle United (4) | 1–2 | Shrewsbury Town (3) | Carlisle |
| 15:00 GMT | Gibson 90+1' | Report | Bloxham 10'; Bowman 78' | Stadium: Brunton Park; Attendance: 2,794; Referee: Sam Barrott |

| 4 December 2021 | Ipswich Town (3) | 0–0 | Barrow (4) | Ipswich |
| 15:00 GMT | | Report | | Stadium: Portman Road; Attendance: 6,425; Referee: Sam Purkiss |

| 15 December 2021 Replay | Barrow (4) | 2–0 | Ipswich Town (3) | Barrow-in-Furness |
| 19:45 GMT | Stevens 26'; Gotts 35' | Report | | Stadium: Holker Street; Attendance: 2,756; Referee: James Bell |

| 4 December 2021 | Portsmouth (3) | 1–2 | Harrogate Town (4) | Portsmouth |
| 15:00 GMT | Harrison 45+2' | Report | Armstrong 44'; Diamond 90+5' | Stadium: Fratton Park; Attendance: 7,857; Referee: Simon Mather |

| 4 December 2021 | Yeovil Town (5) | 1–0 | Stevenage (4) | Yeovil |
| 17:30 GMT | Wakefield; 51' | Report | | Stadium: Huish Park; Attendance: 2,754; Referee: Craig Hicks |

| 5 December 2021 | Rochdale (4) | 1–2 | Plymouth Argyle (3) | Rochdale |
| 12:15 GMT | Morley 55' | Report | Garrick 17'; Jephcott 86' | Stadium: Spotland Stadium; Attendance: 2,687; Referee: Andrew Kitchen |

| 5 December 2021 | Colchester United (4) | 1–2 | Wigan Athletic (3) | Colchester |
| 12:30 GMT | Sears 45+1' | Report | Lang 24', 75' | Stadium: Colchester Community Stadium; Attendance: 2,056; Referee: Carl Brook |

| 5 December 2021 | Kidderminster Harriers (6) | 2–0 | FC Halifax Town (5) | Kidderminster |
| 16:00 GMT | Morgan-Smith 3'; Hemmings 17' | Report | | Stadium: Aggborough; Attendance: 4,290; Referee: Brett Huxtable |

| 5 December 2021 | Salford City (4) | 0–2 | Chesterfield (5) | Salford |
| 17:15 GMT | | Report | Mandeville 28'; Kellermann 86' | Stadium: Peninsula Stadium; Attendance: 1,997; Referee: Ross Joyce |

| 6 December 2021 | Boreham Wood (5) | 4–0 | St Albans City (6) | Borehamwood |
| 19:45 GMT | Rees 25', 49'; Mafuta 64'; Clifton 81' | Report | | Stadium: Meadow Park; Attendance: 4,101; Referee: Ben Speedie |

== Third round proper ==
The third round featured all 44 clubs across the Premier League and the Championship, who entered the competition in this round, along with the 20 winners from the second round. The draw was held on 6 December 2021 at Wembley Stadium, and was done by David Seaman and Faye White. The lowest-ranked team in the third round were Kidderminster Harriers of the sixth-tier National League North. To avoid possible fixture congestion caused by postponements to league matches due to a surge in COVID-19 cases, matches from this round onwards are decided on the day, with extra time and penalties used if necessary.

Number of teams per tier still in competition
| Premier League | Championship | League One | League Two | Non-League | Total |
|---|---|---|---|---|---|
| 20 / 20 | 24 / 24 | 8 / 24 | 8 / 24 | 4 / 32 | 64 / 124 |

| 7 January 2022 | Swindon Town (4) | 1–4 | Manchester City (1) | Swindon |
| 20:00 GMT | McKirdy 78' | Report | Silva 14'; Gabriel Jesus 28'; Gündoğan 59'; Palmer 82' | Stadium: County Ground; Attendance: 14,753; Referee: Darren England |

| 8 January 2022 | Mansfield Town (4) | 2–3 | Middlesbrough (2) | Mansfield |
| 12:30 GMT | Hawkins 67'; Oates 85' | Report | Ikpeazu 4'; Boyd-Munce 14'; Hewitt 90+5' (o.g.) | Stadium: Field Mill; Attendance: 7,297; Referee: Keith Stroud |

| 8 January 2022 | Bristol City (2) | 0–1 (a.e.t.) | Fulham (2) | Bristol |
| 12:30 GMT | | Report | Wilson 105' | Stadium: Ashton Gate Stadium; Attendance: 7,304; Referee: Jon Moss |

| 8 January 2022 | Burnley (1) | 1–2 | Huddersfield Town (2) | Burnley |
| 12:30 GMT | Rodriguez 28' | Report | Koroma 74'; Pearson 87 90+7' | Stadium: Turf Moor; Attendance: 7,654; Referee: Andre Marriner |

| 8 January 2022 | Coventry City (2) | 1–0 | Derby County (2) | Coventry |
| 12:30 GMT | Hyam 42' | Report | | Stadium: Coventry Building Society Arena; Attendance: 8,896; Referee: Andy Madley |

| 8 January 2022 | Hartlepool United (4) | 2–1 | Blackpool (2) | Hartlepool |
| 12:30 GMT | Ferguson 48'; Grey 61' | Report | Anderson 8' | Stadium: Victoria Park; Attendance: 4,932; Referee: Matt Donohue |

| 8 January 2022 | Millwall (2) | 1–2 | Crystal Palace (1) | Bermondsey |
| 12:45 GMT | Afobe 17' | Report | Olise 46'; Mateta 58' | Stadium: The Den; Attendance: 16,646; Referee: Anthony Taylor |

| 8 January 2022 | Barnsley (2) | 5–4 (a.e.t.) | Barrow (4) | Barnsley |
| 15:00 GMT | Andersen 23'; Williams 42'; Cole 83'; Morris 88', 102' | Report | Banks 61'; Glennon 78'; J. Jones 86'; Kay 90' | Stadium: Oakwell; Attendance: 4,755; Referee: Ross Joyce |

| 8 January 2022 | Boreham Wood (5) | 2–0 | AFC Wimbledon (3) | Borehamwood |
| 15:00 GMT | Marsh 10'; Clifton 86' | Report | | Stadium: Meadow Park; Attendance: 3,501; Referee: James Bell |

| 8 January 2022 | Kidderminster Harriers (6) | 2–1 | Reading (2) | Kidderminster |
| 15:00 GMT | Austin 69'; Morgan-Smith 82' | Report | Pușcaș 45' | Stadium: Aggborough Stadium; Attendance: 5,178; Referee: Gavin Ward |

| 8 January 2022 | Leicester City (1) | 4–1 | Watford (1) | Leicester |
| 15:00 GMT | Tielemans 7' (pen.); Maddison 25'; Barnes 54'; Albrighton 85' | Report | João Pedro 27' | Stadium: King Power Stadium; Attendance: 25,710; Referee: Mike Dean |

| 8 January 2022 | Newcastle United (1) | 0–1 | Cambridge United (3) | Newcastle upon Tyne |
| 15:00 GMT | | Report | Ironside 56' | Stadium: St James' Park; Attendance: 51,395; Referee: Tony Harrington |

| 8 January 2022 | Peterborough United (2) | 2–1 | Bristol Rovers (4) | Peterborough |
| 15:00 GMT | Szmodics 20'; Mumba 63' | Report | Coutts 30' (pen.) | Stadium: London Road Stadium; Attendance: 4,937; Referee: Andy Davies |

| 8 January 2022 | Port Vale (4) | 1–4 | Brentford (1) | Stoke-on-Trent |
| 15:00 GMT | Harratt 70' | Report | Forss 26'; Mbeumo 66', 76', 87' (pen.) | Stadium: Vale Park; Attendance: 8,069; Referee: Thomas Bramall |

| 8 January 2022 | Queens Park Rangers (2) | 1–1 (a.e.t.) (8–7 p) | Rotherham United (3) | Shepherd's Bush |
| 15:00 GMT | Dykes 115' | Report | Ihiekwe 98' | Stadium: Kiyan Prince Foundation Stadium; Attendance: 7,157; Referee: Michael Salisbury |
| | Penalties |
| | Dykes (penalty scored); Johansen (penalty scored); Gray (penalty scored); Dozzell (penalty missed); Adomah (penalty scored); Amos (penalty scored); Barbet (penalty scored); Dunne (penalty scored); Dickie (penalty scored) | | (penalty scored) Smith; (penalty scored) Rathbone; (penalty missed) Harding; (penalty scored) Kayode; (penalty scored) Odoffin; (penalty scored) Lindsay; (penalty scored) Bola; (penalty scored) Ihiekwe; (penalty missed) Ogbene |

| 8 January 2022 | West Bromwich Albion (2) | 1–2 (a.e.t.) | Brighton & Hove Albion (1) | West Bromwich |
| 15:00 GMT | Robinson 47' | Report | Moder 81'; Maupay 98' | Stadium: The Hawthorns; Attendance: 8,208; Referee: Robert Jones |

| 8 January 2022 | Wigan Athletic (3) | 3–2 | Blackburn Rovers (2) | Wigan |
| 15:00 GMT | Power 61'; Pears 75' (o.g.); Aasgaard 90+4' | Report | Khadra 49'; Ayala 89' | Stadium: DW Stadium; Attendance: 9,892; Referee: Tim Robinson |

| 8 January 2022 | Birmingham City (2) | 0–1 (a.e.t.) | Plymouth Argyle (3) | Birmingham |
| 17:30 GMT | | Report | Law 104' | Stadium: St Andrew's; Attendance: 9,823; Referee: Rebecca Welch |

| 8 January 2022 | Chelsea (1) | 5–1 | Chesterfield (5) | Fulham |
| 17:30 GMT | Werner 6'; Hudson-Odoi 18'; Lukaku 20'; Christensen 39'; Ziyech 55' (pen.) | Report | Asante 80' | Stadium: Stamford Bridge; Attendance: 39,795; Referee: Jarred Gillett |

| 8 January 2022 | Hull City (2) | 2–3 (a.e.t.) | Everton (1) | Kingston upon Hull |
| 17:30 GMT | T. Smith 1'; Longman 71' | Report | Gray 21'; Gomes 31'; Townsend 99' | Stadium: MKM Stadium; Attendance: 16,282; Referee: Andrew Madley |

| 8 January 2022 | Swansea City (2) | 2–3 (a.e.t.) | Southampton (1) | Swansea |
| 17:30 GMT | Piroe 77'; Bednarek 94' (o.g.) | Report | Redmond 8'; Elyounoussi 95'; Long 102' | Stadium: Swansea.com Stadium; Attendance: 0 Referee: Simon Hooper |

| 8 January 2022 | Yeovil Town (5) | 1–3 | Bournemouth (2) | Yeovil |
| 17:45 GMT | Quigley 48' | Report | Marcondes 19', 43', 70' | Stadium: Huish Park; Attendance: 7,818; Referee: Jeremy Simpson |

| 9 January 2022 | Luton Town (2) | 4–0 | Harrogate Town (4) | Luton |
| 12:30 GMT | Adebayo 18'; Jerome 50'; Naismith 82'; Berry 88' | Report | | Stadium: Kenilworth Road; Attendance: 4,834; Referee: James Linington |

| 9 January 2022 | Cardiff City (2) | 2–1 (a.e.t.) | Preston North End (2) | Cardiff |
| 14:00 GMT | I. Davies 42'; Harris 116' | Report | Johnson 54' (pen.) | Stadium: Cardiff City Stadium; Attendance: 0 Referee: Andy Woolmer |

| 9 January 2022 | Charlton Athletic (3) | 0–1 | Norwich City (1) | Charlton |
| 14:00 GMT | | Report | Rashica 79' | Stadium: The Valley; Attendance: 13,835; Referee: Josh Smith |

| 9 January 2022 | Liverpool (1) | 4–1 | Shrewsbury Town (3) | Liverpool |
| 14:00 GMT | Gordon 34'; Fabinho 44', 90+3' (pen.); Firmino 78' | Report | Udoh 27' | Stadium: Anfield; Attendance: 52,226; Referee: David Coote |

| 9 January 2022 | Stoke City (2) | 2–0 | Leyton Orient (4) | Stoke-on-Trent |
| 14:00 GMT | Ince 43'; Campbell 89' | Report | | Stadium: Bet365 Stadium; Attendance: 5,269; Referee: Sam Barrott |

| 9 January 2022 | Tottenham Hotspur (1) | 3–1 | Morecambe (3) | Tottenham |
| 14:00 GMT | Winks 74'; Lucas 85'; Kane 88' | Report | O'Connor 33' | Stadium: Tottenham Hotspur Stadium; Attendance: 40,310; Referee: John Brooks |

| 9 January 2022 | West Ham United (1) | 2–0 | Leeds United (1) | Stratford |
| 14:15 GMT | Lanzini 34'; Bowen 90+3' | Report | | Stadium: London Stadium; Attendance: 54,303; Referee: Stuart Attwell |

| 9 January 2022 | Wolverhampton Wanderers (1) | 3–0 | Sheffield United (2) | Wolverhampton |
| 14:00 GMT | Podence 14', 80'; Semedo 72' | Report | | Stadium: Molineux Stadium; Attendance: 27,004; Referee: Paul Tierney |

| 9 January 2022 | Nottingham Forest (2) | 1–0 | Arsenal (1) | West Bridgford |
| 17:15 GMT | Grabban 83' | Report | | Stadium: City Ground; Attendance: 24,938; Referee: Craig Pawson |

| 10 January 2022 | Manchester United (1) | 1–0 | Aston Villa (1) | Trafford |
| 19:55 GMT | McTominay 8' | Report | | Stadium: Old Trafford; Attendance: 72,911; Referee: Michael Oliver |

== Fourth round proper ==
The draw for the fourth round was held on 9 January 2022 at Wembley Stadium, and was done by David James and Leah Williamson. The lowest-ranked team in the fourth round were Kidderminster Harriers of the sixth-tier National League North.

Number of teams per tier still in competition
| Premier League | Championship | League One | League Two | Non-League | Total |
|---|---|---|---|---|---|
| 14 / 20 | 12 / 24 | 3 / 24 | 1 / 24 | 2 / 32 | 32 / 124 |

| 4 February 2022 | Manchester United (1) | 1–1 (a.e.t.) (7–8 p) | Middlesbrough (2) | Trafford |
| 20:00 GMT | Sancho 25' | Report | Crooks 64' | Stadium: Old Trafford; Attendance: 71,871; Referee: Anthony Taylor |
| | Penalties |
| | Mata (penalty scored); Maguire (penalty scored); Fred (penalty scored); Ronaldo (penalty scored); Fernandes (penalty scored); McTominay (penalty scored); Dalot (penalty scored); Elanga (penalty missed) | | (penalty scored) McNair; (penalty scored) Payero; (penalty scored) Howson; (penalty scored) Tavernier; (penalty scored) Bamba; (penalty scored) Watmore; (penalty scored) Fry; (penalty scored) Peltier |

| 5 February 2022 | Chelsea (1) | 2–1 (a.e.t.) | Plymouth Argyle (3) | Fulham |
| 12:30 GMT | Azpilicueta 41'; Alonso 105+1' | Report | Gillesphey 8' | Stadium: Stamford Bridge; Attendance: 39,959; Referee: Simon Hooper |

| 5 February 2022 | Kidderminster Harriers (6) | 1–2 (a.e.t.) | West Ham United (1) | Kidderminster |
| 12:30 GMT | Penny 19' | Report | Rice 90+1'; Bowen 120+1' | Stadium: Aggborough; Attendance: 5,327; Referee: Jon Moss |

| 5 February 2022 | Crystal Palace (1) | 2–0 | Hartlepool United (4) | Selhurst |
| 15:00 GMT | Guéhi 4'; Olise 22' | Report | | Stadium: Selhurst Park; Attendance: 22,114; Referee: Peter Bankes |

| 5 February 2022 | Huddersfield Town (2) | 1–0 | Barnsley (2) | Huddersfield |
| 15:00 GMT | Holmes 19' | Report | | Stadium: John Smith's Stadium; Attendance: 16,607; Referee: Jeremy Simpson |

| 5 February 2022 | Peterborough United (2) | 2–0 | Queens Park Rangers (2) | Peterborough |
| 15:00 GMT | Ward 25'; Jones 72' | Report | | Stadium: London Road Stadium; Attendance: 10,119; Referee: David Webb |

| 5 February 2022 | Southampton (1) | 2–1 (a.e.t.) | Coventry City (2) | Southampton |
| 15:00 GMT | S. Armstrong 63'; Walker-Peters 112' | Report | Gyökeres 22' | Stadium: St Mary's Stadium; Attendance: 30,512; Referee: Tony Harrington |

| 5 February 2022 | Everton (1) | 4–1 | Brentford (1) | Liverpool |
| 15:00 GMT | Mina 31'; Richarlison 48'; Holgate 62'; Townsend 90+1' | Report | Toney 54' (pen.) | Stadium: Goodison Park; Attendance: 37,310; Referee: Michael Oliver |

| 5 February 2022 | Stoke City (2) | 2–0 | Wigan Athletic (3) | Stoke-on-Trent |
| 15:00 GMT | Maja 14'; Brown 62' | Report | | Stadium: bet365 Stadium; Attendance: 12,641; Referee: Geoff Eltringham |

| 5 February 2022 | Manchester City (1) | 4–1 | Fulham (2) | Manchester |
| 15:00 GMT | Gündoğan 6'; Stones 13'; Mahrez 53' (pen.), 57' | Report | Carvalho 4' | Stadium: City of Manchester Stadium; Attendance: 53,400; Referee: Jarred Gillett |

| 5 February 2022 | Wolverhampton Wanderers (1) | 0–1 | Norwich City (1) | Wolverhampton |
| 15:00 GMT | | Report | McLean 45+1' | Stadium: Molineux; Attendance: 30,736; Referee: David Coote |

| 5 February 2022 | Cambridge United (3) | 0–3 | Luton Town (2) | Cambridge |
| 17:30 GMT | | Report | Burke 16'; Mendes Gomes 23'; Muskwe 88' | Stadium: Abbey Stadium; Attendance: 7,937; Referee: Thomas Bramall |

| 5 February 2022 | Tottenham Hotspur (1) | 3–1 | Brighton & Hove Albion (1) | Tottenham |
| 20:00 GMT | Kane 13', 66'; March 24' (o.g.) | Report | Bissouma 63' | Stadium: Tottenham Hotspur Stadium; Attendance: 54,697; Referee: Stuart Attwell |

| 6 February 2022 | Liverpool (1) | 3–1 | Cardiff City (2) | Liverpool |
| 12:00 GMT | Jota 53'; Minamino 68'; Elliott 76' | Report | Colwill 80' | Stadium: Anfield; Attendance: 51,268; Referee: Andy Madley |

| 6 February 2022 | Nottingham Forest (2) | 4–1 | Leicester City (1) | West Bridgford |
| 16:00 GMT | Zinckernagel 23'; Johnson 24'; Worrall 32'; Spence 61' | Report | Iheanacho 40' | Stadium: City Ground; Attendance: 28,762; Referee: Paul Tierney |

| 6 February 2022 | Bournemouth (2) | 0–1 | Boreham Wood (5) | Bournemouth |
| 18:30 GMT | | Report | Ricketts 38' | Stadium: Vitality Stadium; Attendance: 9,548; Referee: Graham Scott |

== Fifth round proper ==
The draw for the fifth round was held on 6 February 2022 at Wembley Stadium, and was done by Andy Cole. The matches were played during the week commencing Monday 28 February 2022. The lowest-ranked team in the fifth round were Boreham Wood of the fifth-tier National League.

Number of teams per tier still in competition
| Premier League | Championship | League One | League Two | Non-League | Total |
|---|---|---|---|---|---|
| 9 / 20 | 6 / 24 | 0 / 24 | 0 / 24 | 1 / 32 | 16 / 124 |

| 1 March 2022 | Peterborough United (2) | 0–2 | Manchester City (1) | Peterborough |
| 19:15 GMT | | Report | Mahrez 60'; Grealish 67' | Stadium: London Road Stadium; Attendance: 13,405; Referee: Andrew Madley |

| 1 March 2022 | Crystal Palace (1) | 2–1 | Stoke City (2) | Selhurst |
| 19:30 GMT | Kouyaté 53'; Riedewald 82' | Report | Tymon 58' | Stadium: Selhurst Park; Attendance: 25,420; Referee: Robert Jones |

| 1 March 2022 | Middlesbrough (2) | 1–0 (a.e.t.) | Tottenham Hotspur (1) | Middlesbrough |
| 19:55 GMT | Coburn 107' | Report | | Stadium: Riverside Stadium; Attendance: 31,135; Referee: Darren England |

| 2 March 2022 | Luton Town (2) | 2–3 | Chelsea (1) | Luton |
| 19:15 GMT | Burke 2'; Cornick 40' | Report | Saúl 27'; Werner 68'; Lukaku 78' | Stadium: Kenilworth Road; Attendance: 10,140; Referee: Peter Bankes |

| 2 March 2022 | Southampton (1) | 3–1 | West Ham United (1) | Southampton |
| 19:30 GMT | Perraud 31'; Ward-Prowse 69' (pen.); Broja 90+5' | Report | Antonio 60' | Stadium: St Mary's Stadium; Attendance: 28,383; Referee: Andre Marriner |

| 2 March 2022 | Liverpool (1) | 2–1 | Norwich City (1) | Liverpool |
| 20:15 GMT | Minamino 27', 39' | Report | Rupp 76' | Stadium: Anfield; Attendance: 52,231; Referee: Martin Atkinson |

| 3 March 2022 | Everton (1) | 2–0 | Boreham Wood (5) | Liverpool |
| 20:15 GMT | Rondón 57', 84' | Report | | Stadium: Goodison Park; Attendance: 38,836; Referee: Tony Harrington |

| 7 March 2022 | Nottingham Forest (2) | 2–1 | Huddersfield Town (2) | West Bridgford |
| 19:30 GMT | Surridge 29'; Yates 37' | Report | Lees 13' | Stadium: City Ground; Attendance: 27,417; Referee: Graham Scott |

== Quarter-finals ==
The draw was held on 3 March 2022 at Wembley Stadium, and was conducted by England national football team manager Gareth Southgate. The lowest-ranked teams in the quarter-finals were Middlesbrough and Nottingham Forest, both of the second-tier EFL Championship.

On 15 March, Chelsea requested to play their game against Middlesbrough behind closed doors, due to them being unable to sell any more than the season tickets and 500–600 regular tickets sold before 10 March, after the Russian owner Roman Abramovich was sanctioned by the UK over his links to Vladimir Putin. This would have meant no one would be able to attend, including Middlesbrough fans whose tickets already had sold out. Chelsea's request was withdrawn the same day under criticism from the FA and Middlesbrough.

Number of teams per tier still in competition
| Premier League | Championship | League One | League Two | Non-League | Total |
|---|---|---|---|---|---|
| 6 / 20 | 2 / 24 | 0 / 24 | 0 / 24 | 0 / 32 | 8 / 124 |

| 19 March 2022 | Middlesbrough (2) | 0–2 | Chelsea (1) | Middlesbrough |
| 17:15 GMT | | Report | Lukaku 15'; Ziyech 31' | Stadium: Riverside Stadium; Attendance: 31,422; Referee: Paul Tierney |

| 20 March 2022 | Crystal Palace (1) | 4–0 | Everton (1) | Selhurst |
| 12:30 GMT | Guéhi 25'; Mateta 41'; Zaha 79'; Hughes 88' | Report | | Stadium: Selhurst Park; Attendance: 25,400; Referee: Stuart Attwell |

| 20 March 2022 | Southampton (1) | 1–4 | Manchester City (1) | Southampton |
| 15:00 GMT | Laporte 45+2' (o.g.) | Report | Sterling 12'; De Bruyne 62' (pen.); Foden 75'; Mahrez 78' | Stadium: St Mary's Stadium; Attendance: 29,702; Referee: Mike Dean |

| 20 March 2022 | Nottingham Forest (2) | 0–1 | Liverpool (1) | West Bridgford |
| 18:00 GMT | | Report | Jota 78' | Stadium: City Ground; Attendance: 28,584; Referee: Craig Pawson |

== Semi-finals ==
The draw for the semi-finals was held on 20 March 2022 by former England international Robbie Fowler, before the quarter final between Nottingham Forest and Liverpool on ITV1 and STV.

Number of teams per tier still in competition
| Premier League | Championship | League One | League Two | Non-League | Total |
|---|---|---|---|---|---|
| 4 / 20 | 0 / 24 | 0 / 24 | 0 / 24 | 0 / 32 | 4 / 124 |

| 16 April 2022 | Manchester City (1) | 2–3 | Liverpool (1) | Wembley |
| 15:30 BST | Grealish 47'; Silva 90+1' | Report | Konaté 9'; Mané 17', 45' | Stadium: Wembley Stadium; Attendance: 73,793; Referee: Michael Oliver |

| 17 April 2022 | Chelsea (1) | 2–0 | Crystal Palace (1) | Wembley |
| 16:30 BST | Loftus-Cheek 65'; Mount 76' | Report | | Stadium: Wembley Stadium; Attendance: 76,238; Referee: Anthony Taylor |

== Final ==
14 May 2022
16:45 BST

| Chelsea | 0–0 (a.e.t.) | Liverpool |
|---|---|---|
| | Report |
Penalties
| Alonso (penalty scored); Azpilicueta (penalty missed); James (penalty scored); Barkley (penalty scored); Jorginho (penalty scored); Ziyech (penalty scored); Mount (penalty missed) | 5–6 | (penalty scored) Milner; (penalty scored) Thiago; (penalty scored) Firmino; (penalty scored) Alexander-Arnold; (penalty missed) Mané; (penalty scored) Jota; (penalty scored) Tsimikas |

Wembley Stadium, London
Attendance: 84,897
Referee: Craig Pawson (Sheffield & Hallamshire)

== Top scorers ==
Following the conclusion of the competition, Marske United player Adam Boyes was awarded the FA Cup Golden Ball Award, commemorating him as the top scorer of the season from the extra preliminary round through to the final with eleven goals.

| Rank | Player | Club | Goals |
|---|---|---|---|
| 1 | (Algeria) Riyad Mahrez | Manchester City | 4 |
| 1 | (England) Jayden Stockley | Charlton Athletic | 4 |
| 3 | (England) Ryan Bowman | Shrewsbury Town | 3 |
| 3 | (Jamaica) Jordon Garrick | Plymouth Argyle | 3 |
| 3 | (England) Harry Kane | Tottenham Hotspur | 3 |
| 3 | (England) Callum Lang | Wigan Athletic | 3 |
| 3 | (Belgium) Romelu Lukaku | Chelsea | 3 |
| 3 | (Denmark) Emiliano Marcondes | Bournemouth | 3 |
| 3 | (Cameroon) Bryan Mbeumo | Brentford | 3 |
| 3 | (Japan) Takumi Minamino | Liverpool | 3 |
| 3 | (England) Ollie Palmer | AFC Wimbledon | 3 |
| 3 | (England) Scott Quigley | Stockport County | 3 |
| 3 | (England) James Wilson | Port Vale | 3 |

== Television rights in the United Kingdom ==
The domestic broadcasting rights for the competition were held by the BBC who had held them since 2014–15 and ITV who were showing matches for the first time since the 2013–14 season. After replacing ITV's FA Cup games with other network programming (in a delayed or regular timeslot), films, locally-produced content and acquired international programmes for the majority of the 2008–2014 period that ITV last broadcast the competition, STV broadcast ITV's coverage to viewers in Scotland, with ITV1 games available to stream live or on-demand on STV Player for the first time. ITV also aired exclusive linear coverage of the FA Cup draws across the network.

The following matches were broadcast live on UK television:

| Round | Date | Teams | Kick-off | Channels | |
| Round | Date | Teams | Kick-off | Digital | TV |
|---|---|---|---|---|---|
| First round | 5 November | AFC Sudbury v Colchester United | 19:55 | BBC iPlayer | BBC Two |
| First round | 6 November | Banbury United v Barrow | 17:15 | ITV Hub | ITV4 |
| First round | 7 November | Sheffield Wednesday v Plymouth Argyle | 12:15 | ITV Hub | ITV; UTV |
| First round | 7 November | Sheffield Wednesday v Plymouth Argyle | 12:15 | STV Player | STV |
| First round | 7 November | Stratford Town v Shrewsbury Town | 15:00 | ITV Hub | ITV4 |
| First round | 7 November | St Albans City v Forest Green Rovers | 17:15 | BBC iPlayer | BBC Two |
| First round | 8 November | Dagenham & Redbridge v Salford City | 19:45 | ITV Hub | ITV4 |
| First round (Replay) | 16 November | Solihull Moors v Wigan Athletic | 19:45 | ITV Hub | ITV4 |
| First round (Replay) | 17 November | Stockport County v Bolton Wanderers | 19:45 | BBC iPlayer | BBC Two |
| Second round | 3 December | Gateshead v Charlton Athletic | 19:45 | ITV Hub | ITV4 |
| Second round | 4 December | Buxton v Morecambe | 12:45 | BBC iPlayer | BBC One |
| Second round | 4 December | Yeovil Town v Stevenage | 17.30 | BBC iPlayer | BBC Two |
| Second round | 5 December | Rochdale v Plymouth Argyle | 12:15 | ITV Hub | ITV; UTV |
| Second round | 5 December | Rochdale v Plymouth Argyle | 12:15 | STV Player | STV |
| Second round | 5 December | Salford City v Chesterfield | 17:15 | ITV Hub | ITV4 |
| Second round | 6 December | Boreham Wood v St Albans City | 19:45 | ITV Hub | ITV4 |
| Second round (Replay) | 15 December | Barrow v Ipswich Town | 19:45 | ITV Hub | ITV4 |
| Third round | 7 January | Swindon Town v Manchester City | 20:00 | ITV Hub | ITV; UTV |
| Third round | 7 January | Swindon Town v Manchester City | 20:00 | STV Player | STV |
| Third round | 8 January | Millwall v Crystal Palace | 12:45 | ITV Hub | ITV; UTV |
| Third round | 8 January | Millwall v Crystal Palace | 12:45 | STV Player | STV |
| Third round | 8 January | Hull City v Everton | 17:30 | BBC iPlayer | BBC One |
| Third round | 8 January | Swansea City v Southampton | 17:30 | BBC iPlayer | BBC One Wales |
| Third round | 8 January | Chelsea v Chesterfield | 17:30 | BBC iPlayer | BBC Red Button |
| Third round | 8 January | Yeovil Town v Bournemouth | 17:45 | BBC iPlayer | BBC Red Button |
| Third round | 9 January | Cardiff City v Preston North End | 14:00 | S4C Clic | S4C |
| Third round | 9 January | West Ham United v Leeds United | 14:15 | ITV Hub | ITV; UTV |
| Third round | 9 January | West Ham United v Leeds United | 14:15 | STV Player | STV |
| Third round | 9 January | Nottingham Forest v Arsenal | 17:15 | ITV Hub | ITV |
| Third round | 9 January | Nottingham Forest v Arsenal | 17:15 | STV Player | STV |
| Third round | 10 January | Manchester United v Aston Villa | 19:55 | BBC iPlayer | BBC One |
| Fourth round | 4 February | Manchester United v Middlesbrough | 20:00 | ITV Hub | ITV; UTV |
| Fourth round | 4 February | Manchester United v Middlesbrough | 20:00 | STV Player | STV |
| Fourth round | 5 February | Kidderminster Harriers v West Ham United | 12:30 | BBC iPlayer | BBC One |
| Fourth round | 5 February | Chelsea v Plymouth Argyle | 12:30 | BBC iPlayer | BBC Red Button |
| Fourth round | 5 February | Tottenham Hotspur v Brighton & Hove Albion | 20:00 | ITV Hub | ITV4 |
| Fourth round | 6 February | Liverpool v Cardiff City | 12:00 | ITV Hub | ITV; UTV |
| Fourth round | 6 February | Liverpool v Cardiff City | 12:00 | STV Player | STV |
| Fourth round | 6 February | Nottingham Forest v Leicester City | 16:00 | BBC iPlayer | BBC One |
| Fourth round | 6 February | Cambridge United v Luton Town | 17:30 | BBC iPlayer | BBC Red Button |
| Fourth round | 6 February | Bournemouth v Boreham Wood | 18:30 | ITV Hub | ITV4 |
| Fifth round | 1 March | Peterborough United v Manchester City | 19:15 | ITV Hub | ITV; UTV |
| Fifth round | 1 March | Peterborough United v Manchester City | 19:15 | STV Player | STV |
| Fifth round | 1 March | Crystal Palace v Stoke City | 19:30 | BBC iPlayer | BBC Red Button |
| Fifth round | 1 March | Middlesbrough v Tottenham Hotspur | 19:55 | BBC iPlayer | BBC One |
| Fifth round | 2 March | Luton Town v Chelsea | 19:15 | BBC iPlayer | BBC One |
| Fifth round | 2 March | Southampton v West Ham United | 19:30 | BBC iPlayer | BBC Red Button |
| Fifth round | 2 March | Liverpool v Norwich City | 20:15 | ITV Hub | ITV; UTV |
| Fifth round | 2 March | Liverpool v Norwich City | 20:15 | STV Player | STV |
| Fifth round | 3 March | Everton v Boreham Wood | 20:15 | ITV Hub | ITV; UTV |
| Fifth round | 3 March | Everton v Boreham Wood | 20:15 | STV Player | STV |
| Fifth round | 7 March | Nottingham Forest v Huddersfield Town | 20:15 | ITV Hub | ITV4 |
| Quarter-finals | 19 March | Middlesbrough v Chelsea | 17:15 | BBC iPlayer | BBC One |
| Quarter-finals | 20 March | Crystal Palace v Everton | 12:30 | ITV Hub | ITV; UTV |
| Quarter-finals | 20 March | Crystal Palace v Everton | 12:30 | STV Player | STV |
| Quarter-finals | 20 March | Southampton v Manchester City | 15:00 | BBC iPlayer | BBC One |
| Quarter-finals | 20 March | Nottingham Forest v Liverpool | 18:00 | ITV Hub | ITV; UTV |
| Quarter-finals | 20 March | Nottingham Forest v Liverpool | 18:00 | STV Player | STV |
| Semi-finals | 16 April | Manchester City v Liverpool | 15:30 | BBC iPlayer | BBC One |
| Semi-finals | 17 April | Chelsea v Crystal Palace | 16:30 | ITV Hub | ITV; UTV |
| Semi-finals | 17 April | Chelsea v Crystal Palace | 16:30 | STV Player | STV |
| Final | 14 May | Chelsea v Liverpool | 16:45 | BBC iPlayer | BBC One |
| Final | 14 May | Chelsea v Liverpool | 16:45 | ITV Hub | ITV; UTV |
| Final | 14 May | Chelsea v Liverpool | 16:45 | STV Player | STV |

Broadcast partners for other countries can be found on the FA's website.
