= 2021–22 Barrow A.F.C. season =

Barrow
2021–22 season
- Chairman: Paul Hornby
- Manager: Mark Cooper (until 20 March); Phil Brown (from 21 March)
- Stadium: Holker Street
- League Two: 22nd
- FA Cup: Third round
- EFL Cup: Second round
- EFL Trophy: Group stage
- Top goalscorer: League: Ollie Banks (9); All: Ollie Banks (12)
Home colours	Away colours

The 2021–22 season was Barrow's second consecutive season in League Two. Along with the league, the club also competed in the FA Cup, the EFL Cup and the EFL Trophy. The season covers the period from 1 July 2021 to 30 June 2022.

During pre-season, Mark Cooper was appointed as the club's new manager on a three-year deal.

== Squad statistics ==
As of 7 May 2022

No.	Pos	Nat	Player	Total		League Two		FA Cup		League Cup		EFL Trophy	
No.	Pos	Nat	Player	Apps	Goals	Apps	Goals	Apps	Goals	Apps	Goals	Apps	Goals
1	GK	(England) ENG	Paul Farman	52	0	46+0	0	4+0	0	2+0	0	0+0	0
2	DF	(England) ENG	Connor Brown	28	0	19+2	0	2+2	0	1+1	0	1+0	0
3	DF	(England) ENG	Patrick Brough	49	0	40+1	0	4+0	0	2+0	0	1+1	0
4	MF	(England) ENG	Jason Taylor	18	0	10+2	0	0+2	0	1+0	0	3+0	0
5	DF	(England) ENG	Matthew Platt	31	2	24+4	2	3+0	0	0+0	0	0+0	0
6	DF	(England) ENG	Mark Ellis (out on loan)	22	0	14+2	0	1+1	0	2+0	0	2+0	0
7	MF	(Republic of Ireland) IRL	Jamie Devitt (left)	6	0	0+4	0	0+1	0	1+0	0	0+0	0
8	MF	(England) ENG	Mike Jones	4	0	3+0	0	0+0	0	0+0	0	1+0	0
10	FW	(Republic of the Congo) CGO	Offrande Zanzala (out on loan)	27	5	15+4	3	1+2	1	1+1	0	1+2	1
11	MF	(England) ENG	Josh Kay	41	5	20+14	4	1+3	1	0+1	0	2+0	0
12	FW	(England) ENG	Josh Gordon	43	7	29+7	6	3+0	1	2+0	0	1+1	0
13	MF	(England) ENG	Tom White	36	0	23+4	0	3+1	0	2+0	0	3+0	0
14	DF	(Wales) WAL	James Jones	31	2	20+5	1	4+0	1	0+0	0	2+0	0
15	MF	(England) ENG	Robbie Gotts	39	2	34+1	1	3+0	1	0+0	0	1+0	0
16	MF	(England) ENG	Tom Beadling	13	0	10+2	0	1+0	0	0+0	0	0+0	0
17	FW	(England) ENG	Will Harris	9	0	5+4	0	0+0	0	0+0	0	0+0	0
18	DF	(England) ENG	Joe Grayson	33	2	23+3	2	3+0	0	1+1	0	2+0	0
19	DF	(England) ENG	Anthony Glennon	16	1	13+2	0	1+0	1	0+0	0	0+0	0
20	FW	(England) ENG	Jacob Wakeling	4	0	2+2	0	0+0	0	0+0	0	0+0	0
21	GK	(England) ENG	Josh Lillis	2	0	0+0	0	0+0	0	0+0	0	2+0	0
22	GK	(England) ENG	Scott Moloney (out on loan)	2	0	0+0	0	0+0	0	0+0	0	1+1	0
23	FW	(Wales) WAL	George Williams	22	1	4+14	1	0+0	0	0+1	0	3+0	0
24	DF	(England) ENG	Remeao Hutton	51	0	37+7	0	2+1	0	2+0	0	2+0	0
25	FW	(Wales) WAL	Aaron Amadi-Holloway	14	3	14+0	3	0+0	0	0+0	0	0+0	0
25	DF	(Germany) GER	Festus Arthur (recalled)	15	1	4+5	0	0+1	0	1+1	0	3+0	1
26	FW	(France) FRA	Dimitri Sea	12	2	0+10	1	1+0	0	1+0	1	0+0	0
27	DF	(Republic of Ireland) IRL	Niall Canavan	18	0	17+1	0	0+0	0	0+0	0	0+0	0
28	MF	(England) ENG	Ollie Banks	46	12	37+2	9	4+0	2	2+0	0	0+1	1
30	MF	(England) ENG	John Rooney	19	5	19+0	5	0+0	0	0+0	0	0+0	0
31	DF	(South Africa) RSA	Kgosi Ntlhe	7	0	3+2	0	0+0	0	1+0	0	1+0	0
33	FW	(England) ENG	Luke James	22	0	6+13	0	0+2	0	0+0	0	1+0	0
35	MF	(England) ENG	Jordan Stevens	24	4	15+3	1	3+1	2	0+0	0	0+2	1

== Transfers ==
=== Transfers in ===
Date	Position	Nationality	Name	From	Fee	Ref.
1 July 2021	CB	(England)	Mark Ellis	(England) Tranmere Rovers	Free transfer	
1 July 2021	GK	(England)	Paul Farman	(England) Carlisle United	Free transfer	
1 July 2021	CB	(England)	Joe Grayson	(England) Blackburn Rovers	Free transfer	
1 July 2021	CF	(England)	Josh Gordon	(England) Walsall	Free transfer	
1 July 2021	RB	(England)	Remeao Hutton	(England) Birmingham City	Free transfer	
1 July 2021	CM	(England)	Tom White	(England) Blackburn Rovers	Free transfer	
1 July 2021	CF	(Republic of the Congo)	Offrande Zanzala	(England) Carlisle United	Free transfer	
11 August 2021	LW	(Wales)	George Williams	(England) Grimsby Town	Free transfer	
31 August 2021	CM	(England)	Robbie Gotts	(England) Leeds United	Undisclosed	
31 August 2021	RM	(England)	Jordan Stevens	(England) Leeds United	Undisclosed	
30 January 2022	AM	(England)	John Rooney	(England) Stockport County	Undisclosed	
31 January 2022	CB	(Republic of Ireland)	Niall Canavan	(England) Bradford City	Undisclosed	

=== Loans in ===
Date from	Position	Nationality	Name	From	Date until	Ref.
6 August 2021	CB	(Germany)	Festus Arthur	(England) Hull City	18 January 2022 (Note: On 18 January, Arthur was recalled by parent club Hull City.)	
6 January 2022	CF	(England)	Will Harris	(England) Sunderland	End of season	
7 January 2022	LB	(England)	Anthony Glennon	(England) Burnley	End of season	
12 January 2022	CF	(England)	Jacob Wakeling	(England) Leicester City	End of season	
28 January 2022	CF	(Wales)	Aaron Amadi-Holloway	(England) Burton Albion	End of season	

=== Loans out ===
Date from	Position	Nationality	Name	To	Date until	Ref.
10 January 2022	CF	(Republic of the Congo)	Offrande Zanzala	(England) Exeter City	End of season	
12 January 2022	GK	(England)	Scott Moloney	(England) South Shields	February 2022	
25 January 2022	CB	(England)	Mark Ellis	(England) Solihull Moors	End of season	
25 March 2022	GK	(England)	Scott Moloney	(England) Guiseley	End of season	

=== Transfers out ===
Date	Position	Nationality	Name	To	Fee	Ref.
18 May 2021	CM	(England)	Lewis Hardcastle	Retired		
30 June 2021	CF	(England)	Calvin Andrew		Released	
30 June 2021	CF	(England)	Courtney Baker-Richardson	(Wales) Newport County	Released	
30 June 2021	GK	(England)	Joel Dixon	(England) Bolton Wanderers	Free transfer	
30 June 2021	LB	(Wales)	Dion Donohue	(Wales) Caernarfon Town	Released	
30 June 2021	AM	(England)	Callum Gribbin	(England) Radcliffe	Released	
30 June 2021	CB	(England)	Sam Hird	Retired		
30 June 2021	CF	(England)	Mikael Ndjoli	(England) Aldershot Town	Released	
30 June 2021	CF	(England)	Morgan Penfold		Released	
30 June 2021	LM	(England)	Chris Taylor	(England) Radcliffe	Released	
30 June 2021	CB	(England)	Scott Wilson	(England) Curzon Ashton	Released	
30 June 2021	CB	(France)	Yoan Zouma	(England) Dagenham & Redbridge	Released	
8 July 2021	RB	(England)	Bradley Barry	(England) Stevenage	Free transfer	
15 July 2021	CF	(England)	Scott Quigley	(England) Stockport County	Undisclosed	
28 July 2021	LB	(Northern Ireland)	Bobby Burns	(Northern Ireland) Glentoran	Mutual consent	
31 January 2022	AM	(Republic of Ireland)	Jamie Devitt	(England) Carlisle United	Free transfer	

== Pre-season friendlies ==
Barrow confirmed they would play friendly matches against Holker Old Boys, Lancaster City, Spennymoor Town, Birmingham City, Bolton Wanderers and Southport as part of their pre-season schedule.

10 July 2021 Friendly	Holker Old Boys	1–7	Barrow	Barrow-in-Furness
13:00 BST	Hodgson 78'	Report	Banks (pen.); Zanzala 23', 28'; Kay 26'; Beadling 44'; Sea 48', 87'	Stadium: Rakesmoor Lane

13 July 2021 Friendly	Lancaster City	P–P	Barrow	Lancaster
19:00 BST				Stadium: Giant Axe
Note: Match was cancelled due to the club opting for a pre-season camp in Scotland.

17 July 2021 Friendly	Spennymoor Town	P–P	Barrow	Spennymoor
13:00 BST				Stadium: The Brewery Field
Note: Cancelled due to the number of injuries within the team.

20 July 2021 Friendly	Birmingham City	1–1	Barrow	Kings Norton
13:00 BST	Gardner 76'	Report	Hutton 90'	Stadium: Wast Hills Training Ground; Attendance: 0 (Behind-closed-doors)

24 July 2021 Friendly	Barrow	0–1	Bolton Wanderers	Barrow-in-Furness
15:00 BST		Report	Afolayan 39'	Stadium: Holker Street; Attendance: 1,918; Referee: Marc Edwards

26 July 2021 Friendly	Nottingham Forest	0–1	Barrow	West Bridgford
14:00 BST		Report	Sea 71'	Stadium: Nigel Doughty Academy Training Ground; Attendance: 0 (Behind-closed-doors)

31 July 2021 Friendly	Southport	2–1	Barrow	Blowick
15:00 BST	Anson (?); Bainbridge (?)	Report	Banks (?)	Stadium: Haig Avenue; Referee: Dean Watson

== Competitions ==
=== League Two ===
==== League table ====
Pos	Team	Pld	W	D	L	GF	GA	GD	Pts	Promotion, qualification or relegation
19	Harrogate Town	46	14	11	21	64	75	−11	53	
20	Carlisle United	46	14	11	21	39	62	−23	53	
21	Stevenage	46	11	14	21	45	68	−23	47	
22	Barrow	46	10	14	22	44	57	−13	44	
23	Oldham Athletic (R)	46	9	11	26	46	75	−29	38	Relegation to National League
24	Scunthorpe United (R)	46	4	14	28	29	90	−61	26	Relegation to National League

Source: EFL Official Website
Rules for classification: 1) Points; 2) Goal difference; 3) Number of goals scored; 4) Head-to-head results; 5) Wins; 6) Away goals; 7) Penalty points (sec 9.5); 8) 12-point sending off offences
(R) Relegated

==== Results summary ====
Overall								Home						Away					
Pld	W	D	L	GF	GA	GD	Pts	W	D	L	GF	GA	GD	W	D	L	GF	GA	GD
46	10	14	22	44	57	−13	44	5	9	9	25	28	−3	5	5	13	19	29	−10

Last updated: 7 May 2022.

==== Results by matchday ====
Matchday	1	2	3	4	5	6	7	8	9	10	11	12	13	14	15	16	17	18	19	20	21	22	23	24	25	26	27	28	29	30	31	32	33	34	35	36	37	38	39	40	41	42	43	44	45	46
Ground	A	H	H	A	H	A	H	A	H	A	H	A	H	A	H	A	H	A	A	H	A	H	H	A	H	H	A	A	H	A	H	H	A	H	A	A	H	A	H	A	H	A	H	A	A	H
Result	L	W	D	L	D	W	L	D	W	W	D	L	D	D	L	D	L	L	L	W	L	D	L	W	L	L	L	W	D	L	D	D	L	D	D	W	L	L	L	L	W	D	W	L	L	L
Position	19	11	10	16	18	9	13	15	10	7	11	13	11	13	15	16	19	20	20	19	19	19	19	19	21	21	21	20	19	19	20	20	22	22	21	21	21	21	21	21	21	21	21	21	21	22

Updated to match(es) played on 7 May 2022. Source: Statto.com
A = Away; H = Home; W = Win; D = Draw; L = Loss

==== Matches ====
Barrow's fixtures were announced on 24 June 2021.

7 August 2021 1	Stevenage	1–0	Barrow	Stevenage
15:00 BST	Lines (yellow card) 45+1'; Reeves 46'; Cuthbert (yellow card) 52'; Vancooten (yellow card) 55'; Taylor (yellow card) 90'	Report	Taylor (yellow card) 21'; Banks (yellow card) 22'; Platt (yellow card) 45+2'; Kay (yellow card) 51'; Ntlhe (yellow card) 68'; Devitt (yellow card) 79'	Stadium: Broadhall Way; Attendance: 2,536; Referee: James Oldham

14 August 2021 2	Barrow	3–2	Hartlepool United	Barrow-in-Furness
15:00 BST	Zanzala 3'; Gordon 47', (yellow card) 90+6'; Arthur (yellow card) 67'; Sea 72'	Report	Burey 17', (yellow card) 87'; Goodwin 61'	Stadium: Holker Street; Attendance: 2,846; Referee: Darren Drysdale

17 August 2021 3	Barrow	0–0	Exeter City	Barrow-in-Furness
19:45 BST	Zanzala (yellow card) 18'; Ellis (yellow card) 52'; White (yellow card) 84'	Report	Dieng (yellow card) 47'; Jay (yellow card) 53'	Stadium: Holker Street; Attendance: 2,667; Referee: Andrew Kitchen

21 August 2021 4	Harrogate Town	2–1	Barrow	Harrogate
15:00 BST	Fallowfield (yellow card) 45+8'; Pattison 60', 81'	Report	Zanzala 17', (yellow card) 45+4'; Farman (yellow card) 43'; Banks (yellow card) 70'	Stadium: Wetherby Road; Referee: Trevor Kettle

28 August 2021 5	Barrow	1–1	Bristol Rovers	Barrow-in-Furness
15:00 BST	Hutton (yellow card) 17'; Ellis (red card) 31'; White (yellow card) 34'; Banks (yellow card) 42', (goal) 45+5'; Zanzala (yellow card) 68'	Report	Nicholson 44'; Collins (yellow card) 55'; Finley (yellow card) 90'	Stadium: Holker Street; Attendance: 2,116; Referee: Ross Joyce

4 September 2021 6	Oldham Athletic	0–3	Barrow	Oldham
15:00 BST		Report	Banks 15'; Grayson (yellow card) 34', (goal) 57'; Zanzala 53'	Stadium: Boundary Park; Attendance: 4,232; Referee: Carl Boyeson

10 September 2021 7	Barrow	2–3	Colchester United	Barrow-in-Furness
19:45 BST	Stevens 25'; Banks 76' (pen.), (yellow card) 89'; Jones (yellow card) 88' (yellow-red card) 90'	Report	Judge 35'; Sears 38'; Chambers (yellow card) 50' (yellow-red card) 68'; Sarpong-Wiredu (yellow card) 64'; Hannant (yellow card) 72'; Coxe (yellow card) 79'; Eastman 80'; Nouble (yellow card) 88'; Skuse (yellow card) 89'	Stadium: Holker Street; Attendance: 2,430; Referee: Simon Mather

18 September 2021 8	Bradford City	1–1	Barrow	Bradford
15:00 BST	Vernam 59'	Report	Josh Kay 21'	Stadium: Valley Parade; Attendance: 15,403; Referee: Tom Reeves

24 September 2021 9	Barrow	2–1	Newport County	Barrow-in-Furness
19:45 BST	Kay 63'; Gordon 78'	Report	Azaz 10'; Farquharson (yellow card) 88'	Stadium: Holker Street; Attendance: 2,427; Referee: Bobby Madley

2 October 2021 10	Mansfield Town	0–1	Barrow	Mansfield
15:00 BST	Rawson (red card) 90+6'	Report	Banks 55' (pen.)	Stadium: Field Mill; Attendance: 3,951; Referee: Tom Nield

9 October 2021 11	Barrow	1–1	Leyton Orient	Barrow-in-Furness
15:00 BST	Gotts 48'	Report	Beckles 69'; Archibald (yellow card) 90+2'; Wood (yellow card) 90+4'	Stadium: Holker Street; Attendance: 3,374; Referee: Peter Wright

16 October 2021 12	Port Vale	3–1	Barrow	Burslem
15:00 BST	Politic 51'; Jones 56' (o.g.); Benning 85'	Report	Banks 33', (yellow card) 43'	Stadium: Vale Park; Attendance: 5,951; Referee: Andy Woolmer

19 October 2021 13	Barrow	1–1	Scunthorpe United	Barrow-in-Furness
19:45 GMT	Banks (penalty missed) 74'; Brough (yellow card) 78'; Gotts 80'	Report	Loft (penalty missed) 3', (yellow card) 90+4'; Hackney (yellow card) 21'; Taft 42'; Millen (yellow card) 50'	Stadium: Holker Street; Attendance: 2,739; Referee: Ben Toner

23 October 2021 14	Walsall	2–2	Barrow	Bescot
15:00 BST	Miller 4', 62', (yellow card) 90+3'; White (yellow card) 90+2'	Report	Banks (yellow card) 24'; Grayson (yellow card) 29'; Brough (yellow card) 32'; Williams 36'; Stevens (yellow card) 53'; Kay (yellow card) 63'; Gordon 90+6'	Stadium: Bescot Stadium; Attendance: 4,508; Referee: Andy Haines

30 October 2021 15	Barrow	1–2	Rochdale	Barrow-in-Furness
15:30 BST	Gordon (yellow card) 53'; Banks (penalty missed) 56', 56'; Brown (yellow card) 58'; Platt (yellow card) 90+3'	Report	Beesley 28', 72'; Graham (yellow card) 53'; Odoh (yellow card) 85'	Stadium: Holker Street; Attendance: 3,366; Referee: Declan Bourne

13 November 2021 16	Carlisle United	0–0	Barrow	Carlisle
13:00 GMT	Guy (yellow card) 90+5'	Report	Gordon (yellow card) 51'; Stevens (yellow card) 90+5'; Brough (yellow card) 90+5'	Stadium: Brunton Park; Attendance: 7,470; Referee: Martin Coy

20 November 2021 17	Barrow	0–1	Crawley Town	Barrow-in-Furness
15:00 GMT	Banks (yellow card) 27'; Brough (yellow card) 66'	Report	Tilley 56'	Stadium: Holker Street; Attendance: 3,429; Referee: Sam Barrott

23 November 2021 18	Forest Green Rovers	2–0	Barrow	Nailsworth
19:45 GMT	Stevens 61', 83'	Report	Kay (yellow card) 28'; Brough (yellow card) 57'	Stadium: The New Lawn; Attendance: 1,842; Referee: Chris Sarginson

27 November 2021 19	Sutton United	1–0	Barrow	Sutton
15:00 GMT	Goodliffe (yellow card) 13'; Ajiboye 16'; Bugiel (yellow card) 51'; Davis (yellow card) 82'; Bouzanis (yellow card) 89'	Report	Kay (yellow card) 45'; Banks (yellow card) 74'	Stadium: Gander Green Lane; Attendance: 2,678; Referee: Brett Huxtable

11 December 2021 20	Barrow	2–0	Swindon Town	Barrow-in-Furness
15:00 GMT	Brown (yellow card) 38'; Banks 62' (pen.), (yellow card) 77'; Gotts (yellow card) 71'; Farman (yellow card) 84'; Gordon 87' (pen.); Jones (yellow card) 90+1'	Report	Gladwin (yellow card) 32'; McKirdy (yellow card) 76'; Mitchell-Lawson (yellow card) 87'; Conroy (red card) 90+5'	Stadium: Holker Street; Attendance: 2,863; Referee: Ollie Yates

26 December 2021 21	Tranmere Rovers	2–0	Barrow	Birkenhead
15:00 GMT	Maynard 7'; Spearing (yellow card) 55'; Clarke (yellow card) 78'; Morris 87'; Nevitt (yellow card) 90+2'	Report	Brown (yellow card) 34'; Jones (yellow card) 43'; Gotts (yellow card) 47'; Taylor (yellow card) 63'	Stadium: Prenton Park; Referee: Scott Oldham

29 December 2021 22	Barrow	0–0	Oldham Athletic	Barrow-in-Furness
19:45 GMT	Brown (yellow card) 54'	Report	McGahey (yellow card) 66'; Leutwiler (yellow card) 90+6'	Stadium: Holker Street; Attendance: 3,495; Referee: Ben Speedie

1 January 2022 23	Barrow	1–2	Bradford City	Barrow-in-Furness
15:00 GMT	Gordon 52'; Brown (yellow card) 53'; Kay (yellow card) 90'	Report	Angol 8'; Cook 49'; Cooke (yellow card) 90+7'	Stadium: Holker Street; Attendance: 3,463; Referee: Seb Stockbridge

15 January 2022 24	Colchester United	0–2	Barrow	Colchester
15:00 GMT	Dallison (yellow card) 78'	Report	Platt (yellow card) 24'; Dallison 54' (o.g.); Hutton (yellow card) 81'; Jones (yellow card) 84'; Kay 90+1'	Stadium: Colchester Community Stadium; Attendance: 2,297; Referee: Will Finnie

22 January 2022 25	Barrow	1–3	Mansfield Town	Barrow-in-Furness
15:00 GMT	Jones 17'; White (yellow card) 34'; Banks (yellow card) 67'; Kay (yellow card) 85'	Report	Oates 1'; McLaughlin 25'; Rawson (yellow card) 35' (yellow-red card) 39'; Hawkins (yellow card) 44'; Stirk (yellow card) 45+3'; Bowery 68'	Stadium: Holker Street; Attendance: 3,224; Referee: Sam Barrott

25 January 2022 26	Barrow	0–2	Salford City	Barrow-in-Furness
19:45 GMT	Platt (yellow card) 59'; Brough (yellow card) 72'	Report	Love (yellow card) 38'; Turnbull (yellow card) 52'; Hunter 60'; Shephard (yellow card) 72'; Hutton 90+2' (o.g.)	Stadium: Holker Street; Attendance: 3,510; Referee: Andy Haines

29 January 2022 27	Newport County	2–1	Barrow	Newport
15:00 GMT	Telford 2', 12'; Willmott (yellow card) 90+5'	Report	Brough (yellow card) 41'; Banks (yellow card) 59'; Demetriou 63' (o.g.); Brown (yellow card) 75'; Hutton (yellow card) 81'; Glennon (yellow card) 90+5'	Stadium: Rodney Parade; Attendance: 4,080; Referee: Craig Hicks

1 February 2022 28	Northampton Town	0–1	Barrow	Sixfields
19:45 GMT	McWilliams (yellow card) 71'	Report	Hutton (yellow card) 33'; Amadi-Holloway 51'; Taylor (yellow card) 64'; Kay (yellow card) 79'; Rooney (yellow card) 90+4'	Stadium: Sixfields Stadium; Attendance: 4,604; Referee: Lee Swabey

5 February 2022 29	Barrow	1–1	Tranmere Rovers	Barrow-in-Furness
15:00 GMT	Banks (yellow card) 12', (goal) 58' (pen.); Brown (yellow card) 55'; Glennon (yellow card) 67'	Report	Hawkes 16'; Dacres-Cogley (yellow card) 57'	Stadium: Holker Street; Attendance: 3,699; Referee: Oliver Langford

8 February 2022 30	Hartlepool United	3–1	Barrow	Hartlepool
19:45 GMT	Molyneux 27', 39'; Bogle 44'; Byrne (yellow card) 50'	Report	Glennon (yellow card) 4'; Rooney 17'; Brown (yellow card) 30'; Taylor (yellow card) 42'	Stadium: Victoria Park; Attendance: 4,621; Referee: Peter Wright

12 February 2022 31	Barrow	0–0	Stevenage	Barrow-in-Furness
15:00 GMT	Amadi-Holloway (red card) 55'	Report	Prosser (yellow card) 65' (yellow-red card) 90+7'	Stadium: Holker Street; Attendance: 3,001; Referee: Darren Handley

26 February 2022 32	Barrow	0–0	Harrogate Town	Barrow-in-Furness
15:00 GMT	White (yellow card) 29'	Report	Diamond (yellow card) 55'	Stadium: Holker Street; Attendance: 2,974; Referee: Tom Nield

1 March 2022 33	Bristol Rovers	1–0	Barrow	Horfield
19:45 GMT	Evans (yellow card) 45+3', (goal) 81'; Anderton (yellow card) 53'; Collins (yellow card) 68'	Report	Canavan (red card) 32'	Stadium: Memorial Stadium; Attendance: 6,685; Referee: David Rock

5 March 2022 34	Barrow	1–1	Walsall	Barrow-in-Furness
15:00 GMT	Rooney 35'; Platt (yellow card) 82'	Report	Monthé (yellow card) 19'; Tomlin (yellow card) 20'; Daniels 67'	Stadium: Holker Street; Attendance: 3,439; Referee: Leigh Doughty

12 March 2022 35	Rochdale	0–0	Barrow	Rochdale
15:00 GMT	Dorsett (yellow card) 68'; Broadbent (yellow card) 83'	Report	Banks (yellow card) 45+2'; Sea (yellow card) 86'	Stadium: Spotland Stadium; Attendance: 2,935; Referee: Charles Breakspear

15 March 2022 36	Scunthorpe United	0–1	Barrow	Scunthorpe
19:45 GMT	Grant (red card) 22'; Watson (yellow card) 89'	Report	Rooney 44'; Beadling (yellow card) 75' (yellow-red card) 90'; Brough (yellow card) 84'	Stadium: Glanford Park; Attendance: 2,009; Referee: Tom Reeves

19 March 2022 37	Barrow	1–2	Carlisle United	Barrow-in-Furness
15:00 GMT	Farman (yellow card) 65'; Banks 78'; Rooney (yellow card) 90'	Report	Gibson 32'; Mellish (yellow card) 47'; Dennis 75', (yellow card) 76'; Dickenson (yellow card) 81'	Stadium: Holker Street; Attendance: 4,658; Referee: Bobby Madley

26 March 2022 38	Leyton Orient	2–0	Barrow	Leyton
15:00 GMT	Pratley (yellow card) 27'; Smyth 52'; Sotiriou 62'; Beckles (yellow card) 88'	Report	Brough (yellow card) 16'; Taylor (yellow card) 32'; Rooney (yellow card) 65'; Canavan (yellow card) 80'; White (yellow card) 90+4'	Stadium: Brisbane Road; Attendance: 6,032; Referee: Simon Mather

2 April 2022 39	Barrow	1–2	Port Vale	Barrow-in-Furness
15:00 BST	Canavan (yellow card) 13'; Kay 24'; Farman (yellow card) 45'	Report	Hall (yellow card) 40'; Proctor 59'; Walker (yellow card) 63'; Martin 89'	Stadium: Holker Street; Attendance: 3,215; Referee: James Oldham

9 April 2022 40	Crawley Town	1–0	Barrow	Crawley
15:00 BST	Appiah 57'	Report	Kay (yellow card) 64'; Rooney (yellow card) 68'; Platt (yellow card) 86'	Stadium: Broadfield Stadium; Attendance: 2,081; Referee: Craig Hicks

15 April 2022 41	Barrow	4–0	Forest Green Rovers	Barrow-in-Furness
15:00 BST	Grayson 5'; Rooney 38'; Gotts (yellow card) 43'; Platt 53'; Gordon (yellow card) 70'; Amadi-Holloway (yellow card) 74', (goal) 90+2'	Report	Cadden (yellow card) 28'; March (yellow card) 36'; Adams (yellow card) 75'	Stadium: Holker Street; Attendance: 3,098; Referee: Seb Stockbridge

18 April 2022 42	Salford City	2–2	Barrow	Salford
15:00 BST	Watson 23'; Lund (yellow card) 75'; Henderson 89'	Report	Beadling (yellow card) 30'; Brown (yellow card) 45+2'; Gordon 66'; Amadi-Holloway 83'	Stadium: Moor Lane; Attendance: 2,575; Referee: Andy Haines

23 April 2022 43	Barrow	1–0	Sutton United	Barrow-in-Furness
15:00 BST	Kay (yellow card) 32' (yellow-red card) 68'; Rooney 68'; Brown (yellow card) 75'	Report	Ajiboye (yellow card) 67'; Milsom (penalty missed) 76'	Stadium: Holker Street; Attendance: 3,019; Referee: Ben Toner

26 April 2022 44	Exeter City	2–1	Barrow	Exeter
19:45 BST	Sweeney (yellow card) 31'; Phillips 35'; Jay 78'; Brown (yellow card) 87'	Report	Dawson 11' (o.g.); Brown (yellow card) 57'	Stadium: St. James' Park; Attendance: 7,860; Referee: Lee Swabey

30 April 2022 45	Swindon Town	2–1	Barrow	Swindon
15:00 BST	Davison 22'; Odimayo (yellow card) 61'; Reed 85'	Report	Gotts (yellow card) 24'; Brough (yellow card) 73'; Platt 83'; Gordon (yellow card) 90+8'	Stadium: The County Ground; Attendance: 13,355; Referee: Robert Lewis

7 May 2022 46	Barrow	1–3	Northampton Town	Barrow-in-Furness
15:00 BST	Kay 45', (yellow card) 45+1'; Grayson (yellow card) 80'	Report	Hoskins 5', 22', (yellow card) 49'; Horsfall 14'; Rose (yellow card) 77'; Roberts (red card) 90+2'	Stadium: Holker Street; Attendance: 4,603; Referee: Ross Joyce

=== FA Cup ===
Barrow were drawn away to Banbury United in the first round, Ipswich Town in the second round and Barnsley in the third round.

6 November 2021 First round	Banbury United	0–4	Barrow	Banbury
17:15 GMT		Report	Gordon 8'; Hutton (yellow card) 47'; Zanzala 55'; Banks 80' (pen.); Stevens 83'	Stadium: Spencer Stadium; Attendance: 2,400; Referee: Rebecca Welch

4 December 2021 Second round	Ipswich Town	0–0	Barrow	Ipswich
15:00 GMT	El Mizouni (yellow card) 33'; Chaplin (yellow card) 56'; Morsy (yellow card) 71'	Report	Brown (yellow card) 56'	Stadium: Portman Road; Attendance: 6,425; Referee: Sam Purkiss

15 December 2021 Second round replay	Barrow	2–0	Ipswich Town	Barrow-in-Furness
19:45 GMT	Stevens 26'; Gotts 35'	Report	Morsy (yellow card) 66'	Stadium: Holker Street; Attendance: 2,756; Referee: James Bell

8 January 2022 Third round	Barnsley	5–4 (a.e.t.)	Barrow	Barnsley
15:00 GMT	Andersen 23'; Styles (yellow card) 31'; Williams 42'; Moon (yellow card) 60'; Cole 83'; Morris 88', 102', (yellow card) 120+2'	Report	Beadling (red card) 38'; Banks 61', (yellow card) 68'; Glennon 78'; Jones 86'; Kay 90'; Arthur (yellow card) 115'; Devitt (yellow card) 120+2'	Stadium: Oakwell; Attendance: 4,755; Referee: Ross Joyce

=== EFL Cup ===
Barrow were drawn at home to Scunthorpe United in the first round and Aston Villa in the second round.

10 August 2021 First round	Barrow	1–0	Scunthorpe United	Barrow-in-Furness
19:45 BST	Sea 50'	Report		Stadium: Holker Street; Attendance: 1,320; Referee: Oliver Langford

24 August 2021 Second round	Barrow	0–6	Aston Villa	Barrow-in-Furness
19:45 BST	Brown (yellow card) 78'; Arthur (yellow card) 81'; Brough (yellow card) 82'; Taylor (yellow card) 90'	Report	Archer 10', 62', 88'; El Ghazi 24' (pen.), 45+2'; Nakamba (yellow card) 35'; Guilbert 75'	Stadium: Holker Street; Attendance: 5,349; Referee: Martin Coy
Note: Live on Sky Sports

=== EFL Trophy ===
Barrow were drawn into Northern Group G alongside Accrington Stanley, Leicester City U21s and Fleetwood Town. The group stage matches were confirmed on 29 June.

Pos	Div	Team	Pld	W	PW	PL	L	GF	GA	GD	Pts	Qualification
1	L1	Accrington Stanley	3	2	1	0	0	11	3	+8	8	Advance to Round 2
2	L1	Fleetwood Town	3	2	0	0	1	8	6	+2	6	Advance to Round 2
3	L2	Barrow	3	1	0	1	1	4	5	−1	4	
4	ACA	Leicester City U21	3	0	0	0	3	1	10	−9	0	

Source: EFL.com

31 August 2021 Group game 1	Accrington Stanley	2–2 (5–4 p)	Barrow	Accrington
19:45 BST	Bishop 32', 50'; Moonan (yellow card) 73'	Report	Arthur 48'; Banks 72' (pen.)	Stadium: Crown Ground; Attendance: 930; Referee: Chris Sarginson
	Penalties
	Bishop (penalty scored); Nottingham (penalty scored); Leigh (penalty scored); Savin (penalty scored); Scully (penalty scored)		Banks (penalty scored); Williams (penalty scored); Zanzala (penalty scored); Brough (penalty scored); Gordon (penalty missed)

5 October 2021 Group game 2	Barrow	1–3	Fleetwood Town	Barrow-in-Furness
19:45 BST	Zanzala 28'	Report	Matete 48'; Edmondson 55'; McMillan 67'	Stadium: Holker Street; Attendance: 1,281; Referee: Robert Lewis

9 November 2021 Group game 3	Barrow	1–0	Leicester City U21	Barrow-in-Furness
19:45 GMT	Ellis (yellow card) 58'; Stevens 90+1'	Report		Stadium: Holker Street; Attendance: 575; Referee: Anthony Backhouse
