= Festus Arthur =

German footballer

Personal information
- Full name: Festus Arthur
- Date of birth: 27 February 2000 (age 26)
- Place of birth: Hamburg, Germany
- Height: 6 ft 3 in (1.91 m)
- Position: Defender

Team information
- Current team: Bedford Town

Senior career*
Years	Team	Apps	(Gls)
2019–2020	Stockport County	31	(2)
2020–2022	Hull City	0	(0)
2021–2022	→ Barrow (loan)	9	(0)
2022–2025	FC Halifax Town	30	(0)
2024	→ Southport (loan)	18	(1)
2024	→ Southport (loan)	9	(0)
2025	Hyde United	4	(0)
2025	Southport	1	(0)
2025–2026	Chester	9	(0)
2026	King's Lynn Town	7	(0)
2026	→ Kidderminster Harriers (loan)	1	(0)
2026–	Bedford Town	4	(0)
- * Club domestic league appearances and goals as of 14:34, 11 September 2026 (UTC)

Festus Arthur (born 27 February 2000) is a German professional footballer who plays as a defender for National League North club Bedford Town.

== Early and personal life ==
Arthur was born in Hamburg, Germany, and is of Ghanaian descent.

== Career ==
Arthur began his career with Stockport County during the 2019–20 season, scoring 2 goals in 31 league games. In the January 2020 transfer window Arthur attracted interest from a number of bigger clubs, including Hull City.

He signed a three-year deal with Hull City in July 2020 after moving for an undisclosed fee. He made his debut for the club on 8 September 2020 in the EFL Trophy match against Leicester City U21.

In August 2021 he moved on a season-long loan to Barrow. On 18 January 2022, Arthur was recalled from his loan spell.

On 26 July 2022 Arthur's contract with Hull City was terminated by mutual consent so he could join FC Halifax Town. In January 2024, he joined National League North club Southport on an initial one-month loan deal. In October 2024, he re-joined Southport on another initial one-month loan deal.

After signing for Hyde United in August 2025, Arthur rejoined Southport in September 2025, on a permanent contract. Two weeks later he signed for Chester. In February 2026 he signed for King's Lynn Town. The following month, he joined Kidderminster Harriers on loan for the remainder of the season. In July 2026, Arthur signed a permanent deal with Bedford Town.

== Style of play ==
Upon signing for Hull City in July 2020, the club described him as "a powerful centre-half who can also operate in midfield", while club manager Grant McCann described him as "phenomenal".

== Career statistics ==
As of 2 February 2026

Appearances and goals by club, season and competition
Club	Season	League			FA Cup		EFL Cup		Other		Total	
Club	Season	Division	Apps	Goals	Apps	Goals	Apps	Goals	Apps	Goals	Apps	Goals
Stockport County	2019–20	National League	31	2	1	0	—		3 (Note: Appearance(s) in FA Trophy)	0	35	2
Hull City	2020–21	League One	0	0	0	0	0	0	2 (Note: Appearance(s) in EFL Trophy)	0	2	0
Hull City	2021–22	Championship	0	0	0	0	0	0	0	0	0	0
Hull City	Total		0	0	0	0	0	0	2	0	2	0
Barrow (loan)	2021–22	League Two	9	0	1	0	2	0	3	1	15	1
FC Halifax Town	2022–23	National League	20	0	1	0	—		3	1	24	1
FC Halifax Town	2023–24	National League	1	0	0	0	—		0	0	1	0
FC Halifax Town	2024–25	National League	9	0	0	0	—		2 (Note: Appearances in the National League Cup)	0	11	0
FC Halifax Town	Total		30	0	1	0	0	0	5	1	36	1
Southport (loan)	2023–24	National League	18	1	0	0	—		0	0	18	1
Southport (loan)	2024–25	National League	9	0	0	0	—		1	0	10	0
Hyde United	2025–26	Northern Premier League Premier Division	4	0	2	0	—		0	0	6	0
Southport	2025–26	National League North	1	0	—		—		0	0	1	0
Chester	2025–26	National League North	9	0	1	0	—		1 (Note: Appearance(s) in Cheshire Senior Cup)	0	11	0
Career total			111	3	6	0	2	0	15	2	134	5
