= Remeao Hutton =

English footballer (born 1998)

Personal information
- Full name: Remeao Andrew Hutton
- Date of birth: 28 September 1998 (age 28)
- Place of birth: Walsall, England
- Height: 5 ft 9 in (1.74 m)
- Position: Full back

Team information
- Current team: Chesterfield
- Number: 33

Youth career
- 200?–2013: Walsall
- 2015–2016: Sutton Coldfield Town

Senior career*
Years	Team	Apps	(Gls)
2016–2017	Hednesford Town	8	(0)
2016	→ Walsall Wood (loan)	4	(0)
2017	→ Heather St John's (loan)	0	(0)
2017–2021	Birmingham City	0	(0)
2019–2020	→ Yeovil Town (loan)	27	(1)
2020–2021	→ Stevenage (loan)	26	(0)
2021–2022	Barrow	44	(0)
2022–2024	Swindon Town	71	(1)
2024–2026	Gillingham	107	(1)
2026–	Chesterfield	16	(0)
- * Club domestic league appearances and goals as of 13:50, 22 November 2026 (UTC)

Remeao Andrew Hutton (born 28 September 1998) is an English professional footballer who plays as a full back for Chesterfield.

Hutton spent several years in Walsall's academy before being released while still a schoolboy. He played for Sutton Coldfield Town's under-21 team, and joined Hednesford Town's academy as part of his college course. He made a few first-team appearances in the Northern Premier League, played in the Midland League while on loan at Walsall Wood, and attracted the attention of EFL Championship club Birmingham City.

After a lengthy trial, Hutton signed a one-year professional contract, which was twice extended. He spent the 2019–20 season on loan at Yeovil Town of the National League, where he was a first-team regular as they reached the play-offs. He made his Football League debut while on loan at League Two club Stevenage in 2020. He was released by Birmingham at the end of the 2020–21 season, spent the next season with Barrow, and joined a third League Two club, Swindon Town, in July 2022. He then transferred to another League Two club, Gillingham, in January 2024.

== Life and career ==
=== Early life and career ===
Hutton was born in 1998 in Walsall, West Midlands. He was a member of Walsall's academy from the age of eight to about fifteen when he was released. He played for teams including Sutton Coldfield Town's under-21s, and worked in a restaurant and as a sports coach at a gym. As part of his course in sports performance and excellence at Sutton Coldfield College, he joined Hednesford Town's academy. Hutton made his first-team debut for Hednesford in the Northern Premier League Premier Division on 31 October 2016; with his team leading Sutton Coldfield Town 4–1, he came on as a 79th-minute substitute, playing alongside Cohen Bramall, who was soon to join Arsenal. He then spent time on loan at Midland League clubs Walsall Wood, where he made four league appearances and scored in the Midland League Cup on his debut, and Heather St John's, from where he was recalled only days after joining to make his first start for Hednesford. He went on to make ten appearances for Hednesford, eight of which were in league competition.

=== Birmingham City ===
After an extended trial in the second half of the 2016–17 season which included four competitive matches for the under-23 team, Hutton signed a one-year professional contract with EFL Championship club Birmingham City. Together with Charlie Lakin, Hutton was a member of the Birmingham delegation that visited their new partner club, Spanish third-tier side UE Cornellà; he trained with the first team, and declared himself open to a return on loan if that were possible. He returned to Cornellà for a week, but otherwise remained with Birmingham for the rest of the season, playing regularly for the under-23s, and the club took up their one-year option on his contract.

Hutton was in the first-team squad that trained in Austria and Germany in July 2018, but on his return, he broke a bone in his foot during a pre-season friendly and played no more football until the new year. He helped the under-23s finish as runners-up in the Professional Development League northern section, and they might have beaten Leeds United in the play-off for the overall title had Hutton's 97th-minute curving shot that hit the crossbar gone a little lower. The match was still goalless after extra time, and Leeds won on penalties. In March, Hutton was offered a two-year extension to his contract, and he signed it in May.

==== Yeovil Town loan ====
Ahead of the 2019–20 season, Hutton trained with Northampton Town with a view to a loan, but no move ensued. Instead, he and team-mate Olly McCoy joined National League club Yeovil Town on loan until 2 January 2020. Hutton started in Yeovil's first three matches, and was then dropped to the bench to accommodate Myles Hippolyte for the visit to Ebbsfleet United. He replaced the injured Rhys Murphy after half an hour, and scored the second goal of a 3–1 win just after half-time when he "cut in from the left-flank before finding the bottom corner with a right-footed shot from 20 yards (18 m)." He returned to the starting eleven for the next match, and continued as a regular for the first half of the season, playing on either side of the defence as well as creating goals for team-mates when he ventured forward. He featured several times in the National League Team of the Week. His loan was extended for the rest of the season, and by the time the National League was suspended and then ended early because of the COVID-19 pandemic, he had made 32 appearances in all competitions. League positions were determined on a points-per-game basis, and Yeovil's fourth place meant they faced Barnet in the play-off quarter-finals. Yeovil hit the woodwork three times, and came closest to scoring when Jimmy Smith's shot from Hutton's centre was adjudged not to have crossed the line, but Barnet won 2–0.

==== Stevenage loan ====
After a pre-season match with Birmingham's under-23s during which he played both at right back and as a centre back, Hutton joined League Two club Stevenage on 26 August on loan for the season. The deal included an option to recall the player in the January transfer window. He was on the bench for Stevenage's opening fixture, an EFL Cup tie at home to Portsmouth on 29 August, and came on in the second half, replacing the injured Elliott List after 79 minutes with the score 3–3. There were no more goals, and Stevenage lost the tie on penalties. After 12 minutes of his Football League debut, away to Barrow on the first day of the League Two season, Hutton fouled Bradley Barry to concede a penalty from which Barrow took the lead; Hutton played the whole match, which ended 1–1.

=== Barrow ===
Birmingham released Hutton at the end of the 2020–21 season, and he joined League Two club Barrow on a two-year contract to begin when his Birmingham contract expired. Having made his Stevenage league debut against Barrow, he reversed the process on the opening day of the new season, playing the whole of a 1–0 defeat away to his former club.

=== Swindon Town ===
Hutton signed a two-year contract with another League Two club, Swindon Town, on 15 July 2022; the fee was undisclosed.

Hutton scored his first Football League goal on 21 October 2023 away to Salford City. The goal, for which he "side-footed the ball first time low, hard, and beyond goalkeeper Alex Cairns" from the edge of the penalty area, made the score 1–1; the match ended as a 2–2 draw after Swindon conceded a late equaliser.

=== Gillingham ===
On 17 January 2024, Hutton signed for fellow League Two club Gillingham for an undisclosed fee.

=== Chesterfield ===
In July 2026 he signed for Chesterfield, following the termination of his contract with Gillingham by mutual consent.

== Career statistics ==
As of match played 21 November 2026

Appearances and goals by club, season and competition
Club	Season	League			FA Cup		League cup (Note: Includes Northern Premier League Challenge Cup, Midland League Cup, EFL Cup)		Other		Total	
Club	Season	Division	Apps	Goals	Apps	Goals	Apps	Goals	Apps	Goals	Apps	Goals
Hednesford Town	2016–17	Northern Premier League; Premier Division	8	0	—		0	0	2 (Note: One appearance in Birmingham Senior Cup, one in Staffordshire Senior Cup)	0	10	0
Walsall Wood (loan)	2016–17	Midland League	4	0	—		2	2	—		6	2
Heather St John's (loan)	2016–17	Midland League	0	0	—		—		—		0	0
Birmingham City	2017–18	Championship	0	0	0	0	0	0	—		0	0
Birmingham City	2018–19	Championship	0	0	0	0	0	0	—		0	0
Birmingham City	2019–20	Championship	0	0	0	0	0	0	—		0	0
Birmingham City	2020–21	Championship	0	0	0	0	0	0	—		0	0
Birmingham City	Total		0	0	0	0	0	0	0	0	0	0
Yeovil Town (loan)	2019–20	National League	27	1	2	0	—		4 (Note: Two appearances in FA Trophy, one appearance in Somerset Premier Cup, one in National League play-offs)	0	33	1
Stevenage (loan)	2020–21	League Two	26	0	1	0	1	0	3 (Note: Appearance(s) in EFL Trophy)	0	31	0
Barrow	2021–22	League Two	44	0	3	0	2	0	2	0	51	0
Swindon Town	2022–23	League Two	44	0	1	0	0	0	2	0	47	0
Swindon Town	2023–24	League Two	27	1	1	0	1	0	0	0	29	1
Swindon Town	Total		71	1	2	0	1	0	2	0	76	1
Gillingham	2023–24	League Two	20	0	—		—		0	0	20	0
Gillingham	2024–25	League Two	44	1	1	0	0	0	2	0	47	1
Gillingham	2025–26	League Two	43	0	1	0	1	0	3	0	48	0
Gillingham	Total		107	1	2	0	1	0	5	0	115	1
Chesterfield	2026–27	League Two	16	0	1	0	1	0	1	0	19	0
Career total			303	3	11	0	8	2	19	0	341	5
