= Matthew Platt =

English footballer

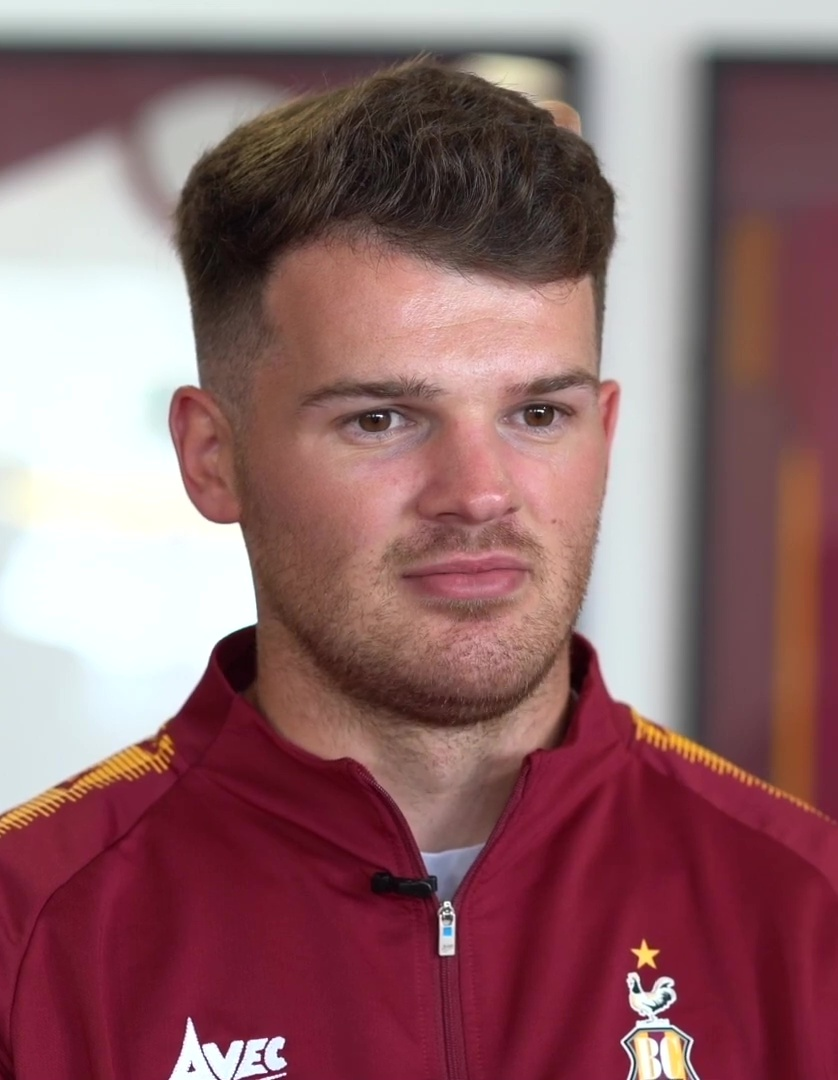

Personal information
- Full name: Matthew James Platt
- Date of birth: 3 October 1997 (age 29)
- Place of birth: Knowsley, England
- Height: 1.88 m (6 ft 2 in)
- Position: Defender

Team information
- Current team: Notts County
- Number: 5

Youth career
- 2013–2015: Blackburn Rovers

Senior career*
Years	Team	Apps	(Gls)
2015–2020	Blackburn Rovers	0	(0)
2017	→ Barrow (loan)	8	(0)
2018–2019	→ Accrington Stanley (loan)	0	(0)
2019	→ Southport (loan)	5	(2)
2019–2020	→ Barrow (loan)	29	(0)
2020–2022	Barrow	52	(4)
2022–2024	Bradford City	74	(2)
2024–	Notts County	33	(2)
- * Club domestic league appearances and goals as of 18:00, 8 March 2025 (UTC)

Matthew James Platt (born 3 October 1997) is an English professional footballer who plays as a defender for EFL League One club Notts County.

== Career ==
=== Blackburn Rovers ===
In November 2015 Platt signed a new professional contract at Blackburn Rovers penning a two-and-a-half-year deal.

In February 2017 Platt and his teammate, Connor Thomson, joined Barrow on loan. He made eight appearances for the Bluebirds during his short spell with the club.

In August 2017 he made his first team debut coming on as a substitute for Blackburn Rovers in a 2017–18 EFL Trophy game against Stoke City Under 21's.

On 3 August 2018, he joined newly-promoted League One side Accrington Stanley on a season-long loan deal. On 2 January he returned to Blackburn Rovers.

On 11 May 2019, he signed a new one-year contract with Blackburn Rovers until the summer of 2020.

=== Barrow ===
On 30 August 2019 he rejoined Barrow on loan until the end of the season. On 29 July 2020 he signed a two-year deal with Barrow for an undisclosed fee.

=== Bradford City ===
In May 2022 it was announced that he would sign for Bradford City on 1 July 2022. At the end of the 2023–24 season, he was offered a new contract by Bradford City.

=== Notts County ===
On 24 May 2024, he signed for Notts County on a two-year contract.

== Career statistics ==
As of match played 8 March 2025

Appearances and goals by club, season and competition
Club	Season	League			FA Cup		League Cup		Other		Total	
Club	Season	Division	Apps	Goals	Apps	Goals	Apps	Goals	Apps	Goals	Apps	Goals
Blackburn Rovers	2016–17	Championship	0	0	0	0	0	0	1 (Note: Appearance(s) in EFL Trophy)	0	1	0
Blackburn Rovers	2017–18	League One	0	0	0	0	0	0	3	0	3	0
Blackburn Rovers	2019–20	Championship	0	0	0	0	1	0	0	0	1	0
Blackburn Rovers	Total		0	0	0	0	1	0	4	0	5	0
Barrow (loan)	2016–17	National League	8	0	0	0	—		0	0	8	0
Accrington Stanley (loan)	2018–19	League Two	0	0	0	0	1	0	4	0	5	0
Southport (loan)	2018–19	National League North	5	2	0	0	—		0	0	5	2
Barrow (loan)	2019–20	National League	29	0	1	0	—		1 (Note: Appearance in FA Trophy)	0	31	0
Barrow	2020–21	League Two	24	2	0	0	1	0	0	0	25	2
Barrow	2021–22	League Two	28	2	3	0	0	0	0	0	31	2
Barrow	Total		52	4	3	0	1	0	0	0	56	4
Bradford City	2022–23	League Two	39	0	1	0	2	0	4 (Note: Two appearances in EFL Trophy, two appearances in EFL League Two play-offs)	0	46	0
Bradford City	2023–24	League Two	35	2	0	0	3	0	5	1	43	3
Bradford City	Total		74	2	1	0	5	0	9	1	89	3
Notts County	2024–25	League Two	33	2	2	2	1	0	0	0	36	4
Career total			201	10	7	2	9	0	18	1	235	13
