= Dimitri Sea =

French footballer

Personal information
- Full name: Dimitri Disseka Sea
- Date of birth: 8 September 2000 (age 26)
- Place of birth: Paris, France
- Height: 1.81 m (5 ft 11 in)
- Position: Forward

Youth career
- –2017: AC Boulogne-Billancourt
- 2017–2020: Aston Villa

Senior career*
Years	Team	Apps	(Gls)
2020–2022	Barrow	18	(1)
- * Club domestic league appearances and goals as of 22:41, 13 May 2022 (UTC)

Dimitri Disseka Sea (born 20 August 2001) is a French professional footballer who last played as a forward for Barrow. He is a product of the Aston Villa Academy and Athletic Club Boulogne-Billancourt, having moved to England from his native Paris aged 15.

== Career ==
Born in Paris, Sea joined Aston Villa's academy in 2017 after playing for Athletic Club Boulogne-Billancourt but was released in summer 2020.

On 26 August 2020, he joined League Two side Barrow following a trial period with the club. He made his debut for Barrow on 3 November 2020 as a substitute in a 1–0 away defeat to Grimsby Town in League Two. He made 8 appearances across the 2020–21 season without scoring. He scored his first goal for the club in August 2021, an overhead kick against Scunthorpe United in the EFL Cup.

He was released from Barrow following the end of his contract in May 2022.

== Career statistics ==
As of 13 May 2022

Appearances and goals by club, season and competition
Club	Season	League			FA Cup		EFL Cup		Other		Total	
Club	Season	Division	Apps	Goals	Apps	Goals	Apps	Goals	Apps	Goals	Apps	Goals
Barrow	2020–21	League Two	8	0	1	0	0	0	1 (Note: Appearance(s) in EFL Trophy)	0	10	0
Barrow	2021–22	League Two	10	1	1	0	1	1	0	0	12	2
Career total			18	1	2	0	1	1	1	0	22	2
