= Offrande Zanzala =

Congolese footballer (born 1996)

Personal information
- Full name: Offrande Jolynold Serge Zanzala
- Date of birth: 8 November 1996 (age 30)
- Place of birth: Brazzaville, Congo
- Height: 1.85 m (6 ft 1 in)
- Position: Forward

Team information
- Current team: Caernarfon Town
- Number: 25

Youth career
- 2008–2015: Derby County

Senior career*
Years	Team	Apps	(Gls)
2015–2018	Derby County	0	(0)
2016	→ Stevenage (loan)	2	(0)
2017	→ Chester (loan)	4	(0)
2018	→ Accrington Stanley (loan)	6	(1)
2018–2020	Accrington Stanley	51	(10)
2020–2021	Crewe Alexandra	5	(0)
2021	Carlisle United	22	(5)
2021–2022	Barrow	19	(3)
2022	→ Exeter City (loan)	15	(2)
2022–2024	Newport County	32	(6)
2024–2025	AFC Fylde	12	(0)
2025	Torquay United	12	(2)
2025–2026	Chester	12	(3)
2026	Marine	23	(3)
2026–	Caernarfon Town	10	(1)
- * Club domestic league appearances and goals as of 11:49, 4 November 2026 (UTC)

Offrande Jolynold Serge Zanzala (born 13 December 1997) is a Congolese professional footballer who plays as a forward for Cymru Premier club Caernarfon Town.

== Career ==
Zanzala emigrated with his family from the Republic of the Congo to Austria in 1999 due to the Second Republic of the Congo Civil War.

=== Derby County ===
Aged eight, he moved with his family to England, and, aged 12, signed with the Derby County Academy. He was named as the Under-21 Premier League Player of the Month in October 2015 after scoring four goals in three youth team matches. On 23 January 2016, he joined League Two side Stevenage on a one-month loan. He made his debut in the Football League later that day, playing the first 67 minutes of a draw with Barnet at Broadhall Way. In February 2017, Zanzala signed a contract extension keeping him with the Rams until 2019.

Zanzala joined National League club Chester on loan in October 2017. He returned to Derby the following month after the expiry of his loan. In January 2018 he was loaned out again, to Accrington Stanley in League Two. He scored his first professional goal on 21 April 2018, an injury-time penalty after he had been fouled, in a 0–4 win at Wycombe Wanderers.

=== Accrington Stanley ===
On 2 August 2018, Zanzala rejoined Accrington, this time on a permanent deal, signing a two-year contract for an undisclosed fee. On 24 June 2020 it was announced Zanzala was leaving Accrington Stanley, having scored eight goals in his second season at the club.

=== Crewe Alexandra ===
On 1 July 2020, Crewe Alexandra announced Zanzala had joined the club on a one-year deal with the option of a second year. He made his Crewe debut in a 3–2 victory at Bolton Wanderers in an EFL Trophy group game on 8 September 2020. He scored his only goal for Crewe on 10 November 2020 in an EFL Trophy group game against Shrewsbury Town. On 2 January 2021 it was confirmed that Zanzala had been released by Crewe by mutual consent.

=== Carlisle United ===
On 8 January 2021 he signed for Carlisle United. At the end of the season, Zanzala was offered a new contract with the club.

=== Barrow ===
On 7 June 2021, Zanzala joined Barrow on a two-year contract. On 10 January 2022, Zanzala joined EFL League Two side Exeter City on loan for the remainder of the 2021–22 season. Zanzala was part of the Exeter team that achieved promotion as League Two runners-up.

On 11 June 2022, Zanzala had his contract terminated by mutual consent.

=== Newport County ===
On 21 June 2022, Zanzala joined Newport County on a one-year contract. He made his debut for Newport on 30 July 2022 in the starting line up for the 1–1 League Two draw against Sutton United. After just two League Two matches Zanzala suffered a serious injury which ruled him out until December 2022. He scored his first goal for Newport on 2 December 2022 on his return to the team as a second half substitute in the 2–1 League Two win against Crewe Alexandra. In April 2023 Zanzala was again ruled out with another serious injury and he did not return to the Newport team until March 2024.

Zanzala was released by Newport County at the end of the 2023-24 season.

=== AFC Fylde ===
On 22 July 2024, Zanzala joined National League side AFC Fylde on a one-year deal. He departed the club by mutual consent on 3 February 2025.

=== Torquay United ===
On 25 February 2025, Zanzala joined National League South side Torquay United.

=== Chester ===
On Monday 30th June 2025, Zanzala joined National League North club Chester on a one-year deal. Zanzala scored his first goal for Chester in a pre-season friendly against Glentoran. He made his official debut on 9th August against Peterborough Sports, where he made an assist allow Fin Roberts to score the opening goal of the game.

=== Marine ===
In late December 2025 he signed for National League North club Marine AFC.

=== Caernarfon Town ===
In July 2026 he signed for Caernarfon Town.

== Personal life ==
Zanzala has three brothers he has nephews and nieces. He is a devout Christian who prays before every game. He went to school with Kwame Thomas and the two are still good friends, as they both began their pro careers with Derby.

== Career statistics ==
As of match played 1 August 2025

Club	Season	Division	League		FA Cup		League Cup		Other		Total	
Club	Season	Division	Apps	Goals	Apps	Goals	Apps	Goals	Apps	Goals	Apps	Goals
Derby County	2015–16	Championship	0	0	0	0	0	0	0	0	0	0
Derby County	2016–17	Championship	0	0	0	0	0	0	0	0	0	0
Derby County	2017–18	Championship	0	0	—		0	0	0	0	0	0
Derby County	Total		0	0	0	0	0	0	0	0	0	0
Stevenage (loan)	2015–16	League Two	2	0	0	0	0	0	0	0	2	0
Chester (loan)	2017–18	National League	4	0	1	0	—		0	0	5	0
Accrington Stanley (loan)	2017–18	League One	6	1	—		0	0	0	0	6	1
Accrington Stanley	2018–19	League One	27	4	1	1	1	0	3 (Note: Appearance(s) in EFL Trophy)	1	32	6
Accrington Stanley	2019–20	League One	24	6	0	0	0	0	4	2	28	8
Accrington Stanley	Total		51	10	1	1	1	0	7	3	60	14
Crewe Alexandra	2020–21	League One	5	0	1	0	0	0	4	1	10	1
Carlisle United	2020–21	League Two	22	5	—		0	0	0	0	22	5
Barrow	2021–22	League Two	19	3	3	1	2	0	3	1	27	5
Exeter City (loan)	2021–22	League Two	15	2	—		—		0	0	15	2
Newport County	2022–23	League Two	15	3	0	0	1	0	1	0	17	3
Newport County	2023–24	League Two	17	3	0	0	0	0	0	0	17	3
Newport County	Total		32	6	0	0	1	0	1	0	34	6
AFC Fylde	2024–25	National League	12	0	0	0	—		0	0	12	0
Torquay United F.C.	2024–25	National League South	12	2	0	0	—		0	0	12	2
Chester	2025–26	National League North	1	0	0	0	—		0	0	1	0
Career total			181	29	6	2	4	0	15	5	206	36

== Honours ==
Exeter City

- EFL League Two runner-up: 2021–22 (promoted)

Torquay United

- National League South runner-up: 2024–25 (Torquay lost playoff semi-final)
