= James Jones (footballer, born 1997) =

Welsh footballer

Personal information
- Full name: James Oliver Jones
- Date of birth: 13 March 1997 (age 29)
- Place of birth: Wrexham, Wales
- Height: 1.83 m (6 ft 0 in)
- Position: Defender

Team information
- Current team: Connah's Quay Nomads
- Number: 4

Youth career
- The New Saints

Senior career*
Years	Team	Apps	(Gls)
2015–2017	The New Saints	8	(1)
2015–2016	→ Gresford Athletic (loan)	6	(0)
2017–2020	Altrincham	96	(11)
2020–2022	Barrow	46	(2)
2022–2025	Altrincham	75	(3)
2025–2026	Chester	13	(1)
2026–	Connah's Quay Nomads	20	(0)
- * Club domestic league appearances and goals as of 05:42, 5 October 2026 (UTC)

James Oliver Jones (born 13 March 1997) is a Welsh professional footballer who plays as a defender for Cymru Premier club Connah's Quay Nomads.

== Career ==
Born in Wrexham, Jones began his career with The New Saints, moving on loan to Gresford Athletic in August 2015. He then spent three seasons with Altrincham, where he made 115 appearances in all competitions. In July 2020, he signed for Barrow. On 28 July 2022 Jones re-signed for Altrincham.

On 31 May 2025, Jones joined National League North side Chester on a one-year deal. His contract was terminated by mutual consent on 2 January 2026.

He then joined Cymru Premier side Connah's Quay Nomads.

== Career statistics ==
As of end of 2024–25 season

Appearances and goals by club, season and competition
Club	Season	League			National Cup		League Cup		Other		Total	
Club	Season	Division	Apps	Goals	Apps	Goals	Apps	Goals	Apps	Goals	Apps	Goals
The New Saints	2014–15	Welsh Premier League	0	0	0	0	1	0	0	0	1	0
The New Saints	2015–16	Welsh Premier League	1	0	0	0	3	0	0	0	4	0
The New Saints	2016–17	Welsh Premier League	7	1	0	0	3	0	0	0	10	1
The New Saints	Total		8	1	0	0	7	0	0	0	15	1
Gresford Athletic (loan)	2015–16	Cymru Alliance	6	0	0	0	0	0	0	0	6	0
Altrincham	2017–18	Northern Premier League	27	3	0	0	—	—	1 (Note: Appearance(s) in FA Trophy.)	0	28	3
Altrincham	2018–19	National League North	40	3	1	0	—	—	0	0	41	3
Altrincham	2019–20	National League North	29	5	3	0	—	—	0	0	32	5
Altrincham	Total		96	11	4	0	0	0	1	0	101	11
Barrow	2020–21	League Two	21	1	0	0	1	0	1 (Note: Appearance(s) in EFL Trophy.)	0	23	1
Barrow	2021–22	League Two	25	1	4	1	0	0	2	0	31	2
Barrow	Total		46	2	4	1	1	0	3	0	54	3
Altrincham	2022–23	National League	36	2	2	0	—	—	5	1	43	3
Altrincham	2023–24	National League	12	0	0	0	—		0	0	12	0
Altrincham	2024–25	National League	27	1	2	0	—		4 (Note: Three appearances and one goal in National League Cup, one appearance in FA Trophy)	1	33	2
Altrincham	Total		75	3	4	0	0	0	9	2	88	5
Career total			231	17	12	1	8	0	13	2	264	20
