= Jordan Stevens =

English footballer (born 2000)

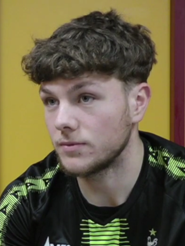
- Stevens after signing for Bradford City in January 2021

Personal information
- Full name: Jordan Harry Stevens
- Date of birth: 25 March 2000 (age 26)
- Place of birth: Gloucester, England
- Height: 5 ft 10 in (1.78 m)
- Positions: Winger; central midfielder

Team information
- Current team: Ilkeston Town

Youth career
- –2017: Forest Green Rovers

Senior career*
| Years | Team | Apps | (Gls) |
| 2017–2018 | Forest Green Rovers | 9 | (0) |
| 2018–2021 | Leeds United | 5 | (0) |
| 2020–2021 | → Swindon Town (loan) | 13 | (1) |
| 2021 | → Bradford City (loan) | 16 | (0) |
| 2021–2023 | Barrow | 32 | (3) |
| 2023–2024 | Yeovil Town | 23 | (1) |
| 2024– | Ilkeston Town | | |
- * Club domestic league appearances and goals as of 06:50, 14 September 2024 (UTC)

Jordan Harry Stevens (born 25 March 2000) is an English footballer who plays as a midfielder for Northern Premier League Premier Division club Ilkeston Town. He can play as a winger or as a central midfielder.

Stevens started his career at Forest Green Rovers in League Two in 2017 after coming through their academy, before signing for Leeds United in summer 2018. He made six first-team appearances whilst at Leeds, and also had loan spells at Swindon Town and Bradford City. He joined Barrow in August 2021 and then went on to sign a 15-month deal with Yeovil Town in March 2023.

== Career ==
=== Forest Green Rovers ===
Progressing through the ranks at Forest Green Rovers, Stevens signed his first professional contract on 11 September 2017. The following day, he made his debut as a substitute in a 1–0 defeat to Lincoln City. He made 15 appearances for Forest Green Rovers in all competitions scoring one goal against Cheltenham Town in the EFL Trophy on 3 October 2017.

=== Leeds United ===
On 1 February 2018, Stevens joined Leeds United on an initial two-and-a-half-year deal with an optional extra year for an undisclosed fee. As part of the deal to bring Stevens to Leeds, on 31 May 2018, Forest Green Rovers announced a pre-season friendly against Leeds. He made his first start for Leeds' first team when he played in their pre-season friendly 1–1 draw against York City on 20 July 2018, under new Leeds Head Coach Marcelo Bielsa. On 26 July 2018, Stevens was given the number 48 shirt for the upcoming 2018–19 season for Leeds. He was named in a Leeds first team squad in a competitive game for first time on 6 January 2019 when he was named on the bench, during a 2–1 defeat to Queens Park Rangers in the third round of the FA Cup. He was named on the bench in the following game for the first time in the EFL Championship as an unused substitute in a 2–0 win against Derby County side on 11 January 2019 and played his first minutes of Championship football the following week when he came on in the 76th minute for Mateusz Klich in Leeds' 2–1 defeat to Stoke City. Stevens featured as an unused substitute on the bench for the 1st team squad in the Championship on several occasions, but still featured regularly for Carlos Corberán's Leeds United under-23 side over the course the 2018/19 season, that won the PDL Northern League 2018/19 Season by winning the league, they then became the national Professional Development League Champions by beating Birmingham City in the final.

On 13 July 2019, Stevens was one of 16 players named in Leeds first-team squad for their 2019–20 pre-season tour of Australia for matches against Manchester United and West Sydney Wanderers. He made his second Championship appearance on 21 December 2019, in Leeds' 2–1 defeat at Fulham when he came on as a 72nd-minute substitute for Luke Ayling. After the English professional football season was paused in March 2020 due to Impact of the COVID-19 pandemic on association football, the season was resumed during June, where Stevens earned promotion with Leeds to the Premier League and also become the EFL Championship Champions for the 2019-20 season in July after the successful resumption of the season.

Stevens signed for League One club Swindon Town on a season-long loan on 21 September 2020. Stevens scored on his debut in a 4–2 victory against Burton Albion on 26 September 2020 in League One. He was recalled in January 2021, having scored once in 16 appearances. He joined Bradford City of League Two on loan until the end of the season on 8 January 2021. He made 16 appearances on loan at the club without scoring.

=== Barrow ===
On 31 August 2021, Stevens joined League Two club Barrow on a free transfer. He signed a two-year contract with the club.

On 3 March 2023, he departed the club after his contract was terminated by mutual consent.

=== Yeovil Town ===
After his departure from Barrow, Stevens signed for National League club Yeovil Town. At the end of the 2023–24 season, Stevens was released by Yeovil following the club's promotion from the National League South.

== Style of play ==
He is known for his pace and his footwork. Stevens started his career as a central midfielder at Forest Green, before playing a short spell at right-back for Leeds' under-23s before being converted into a winger under Marcelo Bielsa, with Bielsa proclaiming "He has all the skills needed to play in the attack, he has good quality and speed too.".

== Gambling ==
On 2 August 2019, Stevens was charged with a breach in betting regulations relating to gambling on football matches. He was accused by the Football Association of allegedly placing 59 bets on matches during the 2018/19 season. Leeds United put out a statement stating that Stevens would 'accept the charge' and that 'the player fully understands he has made an error'. On 10 September 2019, Stevens was given a six-week ban from 'all' football by the FA, including playing, training and communication with the club and his teammates, with Leeds responding by saying 'We are hugely disappointed in the FA's choice of sanction'.

== Career statistics ==
As of match played 11 April 2024

Appearances and goals by club, season and competition
| Club | Season | League | | | FA Cup | | League Cup | | Other | | Total | |
| Club | Season | Division | Apps | Goals | Apps | Goals | Apps | Goals | Apps | Goals | Apps | Goals |
|---|---|---|---|---|---|---|---|---|---|---|---|---|
| Forest Green Rovers | 2017–18 | League Two | 9 | 0 | 3 | 0 | 0 | 0 | 3 | 1 | 15 | 1 |
| Leeds United | 2018–19 | Championship | 1 | 0 | 0 | 0 | 0 | 0 | — | | 1 | 0 |
| Leeds United | 2019–20 | Championship | 4 | 0 | 1 | 0 | 0 | 0 | — | | 5 | 0 |
| Leeds United | 2020–21 | Premier League | 0 | 0 | 0 | 0 | 0 | 0 | — | | 0 | 0 |
| Leeds United | Leeds United total | | 5 | 0 | 1 | 0 | 0 | 0 | 0 | 0 | 6 | 0 |
| Swindon Town (loan) | 2020–21 | League One | 13 | 1 | 1 | 0 | 0 | 0 | 2 | 0 | 16 | 1 |
| Bradford City (loan) | 2020–21 | League Two | 16 | 0 | 0 | 0 | 0 | 0 | 0 | 0 | 16 | 0 |
| Barrow | 2021–22 | League Two | 19 | 1 | 4 | 2 | 0 | 0 | 2 | 1 | 25 | 4 |
| Barrow | 2022–23 | League Two | 13 | 2 | 0 | 0 | 2 | 0 | 4 | 0 | 19 | 2 |
| Barrow | Barrow total | | 32 | 3 | 4 | 2 | 0 | 0 | 6 | 1 | 44 | 6 |
| Yeovil Town | 2022–23 | National League | 4 | 0 | — | | — | | — | | 4 | 0 |
| Yeovil Town | 2023–24 | National League South | 19 | 1 | 3 | 1 | — | | 0 | 0 | 22 | 2 |
| Yeovil Town | Yeovil Town total | | 23 | 1 | 3 | 1 | — | | 0 | 0 | 26 | 2 |
| Career total | | | 98 | 5 | 12 | 3 | 2 | 0 | 11 | 2 | 123 | 10 |

== Honours ==
Leeds United

- EFL Championship: 2019–20

Yeovil Town

- National League South: 2023–24
