= 2022–23 EFL Cup =

63rd season of the EFL Cup

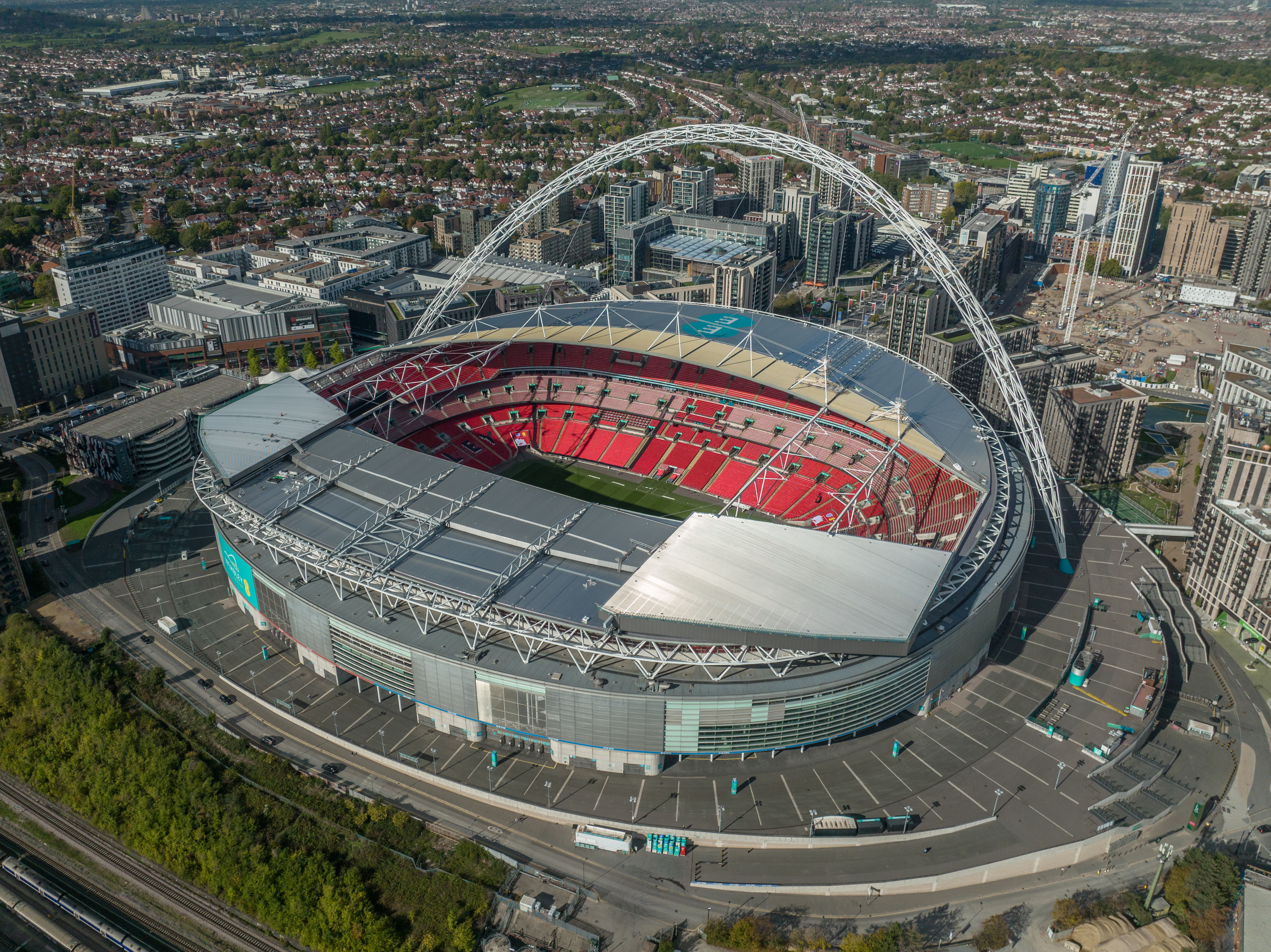
- Wembley Stadium hosted the final

Tournament details
- Country: England; Wales
- Dates: 2 August 2022 – 26 February 2023
- Teams: 92

Final positions
- Champions: Manchester United (6th title)
- Runners-up: Newcastle United

Tournament statistics
- Matches played: 93
- Goals scored: 241 (2.59 per match)
- Attendance: 1,554,555 (16,716 per match)
- Top goal scorer(s): Marcus Rashford (6 goals)

The 2022–23 EFL Cup was the 63rd season of the EFL Cup (known as the Carabao Cup for sponsorship reasons). The competition was open to all clubs participating in the Premier League and the English Football League.

The winner of the competition qualified for the play-off round of the 2023–24 UEFA Europa Conference League.

Liverpool were the defending champions, having beaten Chelsea on penalties to secure a record 9th title in the previous season's final, but were eliminated by Manchester City in the fourth round.

The final was played at Wembley Stadium on 26 February 2023 between Manchester United and Newcastle United, with Manchester United winning 2–0 for their sixth title.

== Access ==
All 92 clubs in the Premier League and English Football League entered the season's EFL Cup. Access was distributed across the top 4 leagues of the English football league system.

In the first round, 22 of 24 Championship clubs, and all League One and League Two clubs entered.

The following round, the two remaining Championship clubs, who finished 18th and 19th in the 2021–22 Premier League season (Burnley and Watford), and the Premier League clubs not involved in either the Champions League, Europa League or Europa Conference League entered.

	Clubs entering in this round	Clubs advancing from previous round	Number of games	Main date
First round (70 clubs)	24 clubs from EFL League Two; 24 clubs from EFL League One; 22 clubs from EFL Championship	N/A	35	w/c 8 August 2022
Second round (50 clubs)	2 clubs from EFL Championship; 13 Premier League clubs (not involved in European competition)	35 winners from first round	25	w/c 22 August 2022
Third round (32 clubs)	7 Premier League clubs (involved in European competition)	25 winners from second round	16	w/c 7 November 2022
Fourth round (16 clubs)	No clubs enter the fourth round	16 winners from third round	8	w/c 19 December 2022
Quarter-finals (8 clubs)	No clubs enter the quarter-finals	8 winners from fourth round	4	w/c 9 January 2023
Semi-finals (4 clubs)	No clubs enter the semi-finals	4 winners from quarter-finals	4 (two-legged)	w/c 23 January 2023 w/c 30 January 2023
Final (2 clubs)	No clubs enter the final	2 winners from semi-finals	1	26 February 2023

== First round ==
A total of 70 clubs played in the first round: 24 from League Two (tier 4), 24 from League One (tier 3), and 22 from the Championship (tier 2). The draw for this round was split on a geographical basis into "northern" and "southern" sections. Teams were drawn against a team from the same section.

=== Northern section ===
9 August 2022	Shrewsbury Town (3)	3–2	Carlisle United (4)	Shrewsbury
19:30 BST	Leahy 45+1'; Udoh 75'; Dunkley 86'	Report	Edmondson 13'; Dennis 81'	Stadium: New Meadow; Attendance: 2,269; Referee: Christopher Pollard

9 August 2022	Accrington Stanley (3)	2–2 (11–12 p)	Tranmere Rovers (4)	Accrington
19:45 BST	Adedoyin 37'; Astley 39'	Report	Hawkes 62'; Astley 90+3' (o.g.)	Stadium: Crown Ground; Attendance: 1,035; Referee: Robert Lewis
	Penalties
	McConville (penalty scored); Whalley (penalty scored); Pritchard (penalty missed); Astley (penalty scored); Pell (penalty scored); Clark (penalty scored); Woods (penalty scored); Coyle (penalty scored); Sangare (penalty scored); Rodgers (penalty scored); Jensen (penalty scored); McConville (penalty scored); Whalley (penalty missed)		(penalty scored) Hemmings; (penalty scored) Hawkes; (penalty missed) Hughes; (penalty scored) Lewis; (penalty scored) Robinson; (penalty scored) McAlear; (penalty scored) Byrne; (penalty scored) Dacres-Cogley; (penalty scored) Bristow; (penalty scored) Mumbongo; (penalty scored) Hewelt; (penalty scored) Hemmings; (penalty scored) Hawkes

9 August 2022	Blackpool (2)	0–0 (3–4 p)	Barrow (4)	Blackpool
19:45 BST		Report		Stadium: Bloomfield Road; Attendance: 4,972; Referee: Ben Speedie
	Penalties
	Connolly (penalty missed); Husband (penalty scored); Lubala (penalty scored); Lavery (penalty scored); Fiorini (penalty missed)		(penalty scored) Rooney; (penalty scored) Kay; (penalty scored) Waters; (penalty scored) Brough; (penalty missed) Neal

9 August 2022	Bolton Wanderers (3)	5–1	Salford City (4)	Horwich
19:45 BST	Kachunga 31'; Böðvarsson 42'; Sadlier 61'; Bradley 77'; Afolayan 86'	Report	Thomas-Asante 23'	Stadium: University of Bolton Stadium; Attendance: 6,505; Referee: John Brooks

9 August 2022	Bradford City (4)	2–1	Hull City (2)	Bradford
19:45 BST	Cook 39', 44'	Report	Lewis 24' (o.g.)	Stadium: Valley Parade; Attendance: 5,394; Referee: Seb Stockingbridge

9 August 2022	Doncaster Rovers (4)	0–3	Lincoln City (3)	Doncaster
19:45 BST		Report	Kendall 12'; Bishop 47'; Scully 61'	Stadium: Eco-Power Stadium; Attendance: 4,006; Referee: Anthony Backhouse

9 August 2022	Fleetwood Town (3)	1–0	Wigan Athletic (2)	Fleetwood
19:45 BST	G. Garner 24'	Report		Stadium: Highbury Stadium; Attendance: 1,761; Referee: Michael Salisbury

9 August 2022	Grimsby Town (4)	4–0	Crewe Alexandra (4)	Cleethorpes
19:45 BST	Waterfall 13'; Green 34'; Smith 56'; Wearne 86'	Report		Stadium: Blundell Park; Attendance: 2,802; Referee: Adam Herczeg

9 August 2022	Harrogate Town (4)	0–1	Stockport County (4)	Harrogate
19:45 BST		Report	Jennings 53' (pen.)	Stadium: Wetherby Road; Attendance: 1,534; Referee: Thomas Kirk

9 August 2022	Huddersfield Town (2)	1–4	Preston North End (2)	Huddersfield
19:45 BST	Rhodes 67'	Report	Parrott 6'; McCann 20', 30'; Potts 51'	Stadium: John Smith's Stadium; Attendance: 5,550; Referee: Ross Joyce

9 August 2022	Mansfield Town (4)	1–2	Derby County (3)	Mansfield
19:45 BST	Hawkins 56'	Report	Hewitt 30' (o.g.); Barkhuizen 69'	Stadium: One Call Stadium; Attendance: 6,861; Referee: Andrew Kitchen

9 August 2022	Morecambe (3)	0–0 (5–3 p)	Stoke City (2)	Morecambe
19:45 BST		Report		Stadium: Mazuma Stadium; Attendance: 2,806; Referee: Andy Haines
	Penalties
	Connolly (penalty scored); Obika (penalty scored); Watts (penalty scored); Love (penalty scored); McLoughlin (penalty scored)		(penalty missed) Fox; (penalty scored) Smallbone; (penalty scored) Clucas; (penalty scored) Thompson

9 August 2022	Rochdale (4)	2–0	Burton Albion (3)	Rochdale
19:45 BST	Ball 86' (pen.); Rodney 90+4'	Report		Stadium: Spotland Stadium; Attendance: 1,601; Referee: Scott Oldham

10 August 2022	Blackburn Rovers (2)	4–0	Hartlepool United (4)	Blackburn
19:45 BST	S. Wharton 32'; Dack 47'; Dolan 51'; Markanday 73'	Report		Stadium: Ewood Park; Attendance: 6,844; Referee: James Bell

10 August 2022	Middlesbrough (2)	0–1	Barnsley (3)	Middlesbrough
19:45 BST		Report	Benson 90+3'	Stadium: Riverside Stadium; Attendance: 9,361; Referee: Ben Toner

10 August 2022	Port Vale (3)	1–2	Rotherham United (2)	Burslem
19:45 BST	Benning 81'	Report	Rathbone 8'; Ogbene 45+4'	Stadium: Vale Park; Attendance: 3,094; Referee: Bobby Madden

10 August 2022	Sheffield Wednesday (3)	2–0	Sunderland (2)	Sheffield
19:45 BST	Adeniran 16'; Sow 56'	Report		Stadium: Hillsborough Stadium; Attendance: 8,412; Referee: Tom Reeves

11 August 2022	West Bromwich Albion (2)	1–0	Sheffield United (2)	West Bromwich
20:00 BST	Grant 73'	Report		Stadium: The Hawthorns; Attendance: 6,747; Referee: David Webb

=== Southern section ===
2 August 2022	Cambridge United (3)	1–0	Millwall (2)	Cambridge
19:45 BST	O'Neil 59'	Report		Stadium: Abbey Stadium; Attendance: 3,368; Referee: Charles Breakspear

9 August 2022	AFC Wimbledon (4)	0–2	Gillingham (4)	Merton
19:45 BST		Report	Mandron 90'; Green 90+2'	Stadium: Plough Lane; Attendance: 3,008; Referee: Craig Hicks

9 August 2022	Cardiff City (2)	0–3	Portsmouth (3)	Cardiff
19:45 BST		Report	Pigott 58'; Curtis 68' (pen.); Bishop 72'	Stadium: Cardiff City Stadium; Attendance: 6,303; Referee: Lee Swabey

9 August 2022	Charlton Athletic (3)	1–1 (5–3 p)	Queens Park Rangers (2)	Charlton
19:45 BST	Henry 90'	Report	Roberts 80'	Stadium: The Valley; Attendance: 5,629; Referee: Stuart Attwell
	Penalties
	Stockley (penalty scored); Kirk (penalty scored); Morgan (penalty scored); Henry (penalty scored); O'Connell (penalty scored)		(penalty missed) Johansen; (penalty scored) Roberts; (penalty scored) Shodipo; (penalty scored) Dozzell

9 August 2022	Cheltenham Town (3)	0–7	Exeter City (3)	Cheltenham
19:45 BST		Report	Nombe 23', 35'; Collins 26'; Jay 28'; Sparkes 45+1'; Kite 50'; Coley 84'	Stadium: Whaddon Road; Attendance: 2,552; Referee: Will Finnie

9 August 2022	Crawley Town (4)	1–0	Bristol Rovers (3)	Crawley
19:45 BST	Nichols 73'	Report		Stadium: Broadfield Stadium; Attendance: 1,860; Referee: David Rock

9 August 2022	Forest Green Rovers (3)	2–0	Leyton Orient (4)	Nailsworth
19:45 BST	Little 17', 50'	Report		Stadium: The New Lawn; Attendance: 1,055; Referee: James Oldham

9 August 2022	Ipswich Town (3)	0–1	Colchester United (4)	Ipswich
19:45 BST		Report	Hannant 29'	Stadium: Portman Road; Attendance: 11,654; Referee: Sam Purkiss

9 August 2022	Luton Town (2)	2–3	Newport County (4)	Luton
19:45 BST	Mendes Gomes 30'; Lockyer 50'	Report	Collins 36'; Zimba 52'; Waite 76'	Stadium: Kenilworth Road; Attendance: 3,827; Referee: Ollie Yates

9 August 2022	Milton Keynes Dons (3)	1–0	Sutton United (4)	Bletchley
19:45 BST	Grant 41'	Report		Stadium: Stadium MK; Attendance: 2,263; Referee: Charles Breakspear

9 August 2022	Northampton Town (4)	1–2	Wycombe Wanderers (3)	Northampton
19:45 BST	Appéré 76' (pen.)	Report	Jacobson 28'; Mellor 34'	Stadium: Sixfields Stadium; Attendance: 2,711; Referee: Tom Nield

9 August 2022	Norwich City (2)	2–2 (4–2 p)	Birmingham City (2)	Norwich
19:45 BST	Sinani 45+1'; Sørensen 45+3'	Report	Leko 53'; Tomkinson 77' (o.g.)	Stadium: Carrow Road; Attendance: 18,971; Referee: Sam Barrott
	Penalties
	McLean (penalty missed); Gibbs (penalty scored); Sinani (penalty scored); Núñez (penalty scored); Sargent (penalty scored)		(penalty missed) Cosgrove; (penalty scored) Graham; (penalty missed) Leko; (penalty scored) James

9 August 2022	Oxford United (3)	2–2 (5–3 p)	Swansea City (2)	Oxford
19:45 BST	Rodríguez 72'; Brannagan 90+3'	Report	Fulton 8'; Cullen 25'	Stadium: Kassam Stadium; Attendance: 4,373; Referee: Thomas Bramall
	Penalties
	Browne (penalty scored); Rodríguez (penalty scored); McGuane (penalty scored); Spasov (penalty scored); Brannagan (penalty scored)		(penalty scored) Cullen; (penalty scored) Ntcham; (penalty scored) Allen; (penalty missed) Sorinola

9 August 2022	Walsall (4)	2–0	Swindon Town (4)	Walsall
19:45 BST	Johnson 80' (pen.); Abraham 81'	Report		Stadium: Bescot Stadium; Attendance: 2,889; Referee: Thomas Parsons

9 August 2022	Reading (2)	1–2	Stevenage (4)	Reading
20:00 BST	Ehibhatiomhan 63'	Report	Earley 10'; Rose 89'	Stadium: Select Car Leasing Stadium; Attendance: 4,230; Referee: Carl Brook

10 August 2022	Coventry City (2)	1–4	Bristol City (2)	Burton upon Trent
19:45 BST	Allen 62'	Report	Naismith 12'; Conway 18', 30'; Weimann 90+4'	Stadium: Pirelli Stadium (Note: The match was moved to Burton Albion's Pirelli Stadium due to an unplayable pitch at the Coventry Building Society Arena.); Attendance: 2,680; Referee: Peter Wright

10 August 2022	Plymouth Argyle (3)	0–2	Peterborough United (3)	Plymouth
19:45 BST		Report	Jones 28'; Jo. Taylor 90+3'	Stadium: Home Park; Attendance: 6,089; Referee: Allan Young

== Second round ==
A total of 50 clubs played in the second round: the 35 winners from the first round, the 2 clubs from the Championship (tier 2) who did not enter in the first round, plus the 13 Premier League clubs who were not in European competition. The draw for this round was split on a geographical basis into "northern" and "southern" sections. Teams were drawn against a team from the same section.

=== Northern section ===
23 August 2022	Sheffield Wednesday (3)	3–0	Rochdale (4)	Sheffield
19:30	Brown 23'; Dele-Bashiru 36'; Adeniran 44'	Report		Stadium: Hillsborough Stadium; Attendance: 9,045; Referee: Ben Toner

23 August 2022	Shrewsbury Town (3)	0–1	Burnley (2)	Shrewsbury
19:30		Report	Bastien 50'	Stadium: New Meadow; Attendance: 3,819; Referee: Bobby Madden

23 August 2022	Barrow (4)	2–2 (1–3 p)	Lincoln City (3)	Barrow-in-Furness
19:45	Moyo 13'; Whitfield 87'	Report	Scully 8'; Garrick 90+2'	Stadium: Holker Street; Attendance: 3,011; Referee: Simon Mather
	Penalties
	Whitfield (penalty scored); Gordon (penalty missed); Brough (penalty missed); Gotts (penalty missed)		(penalty scored) Scully; (penalty scored) Sanders; (penalty scored) Oakley-Boothe

23 August 2022	Bolton Wanderers (3)	1–4	Aston Villa (1)	Horwich
19:45	Charles 24'	Report	Douglas Luiz 36'; Ings 63' (pen.); Digne 66'; Bailey 87'	Stadium: University of Bolton Stadium; Attendance: 20,064; Referee: Andrew Kitchen

23 August 2022	Bradford City (4)	1–2	Blackburn Rovers (2)	Bradford
19:45	Cook 18'	Report	Dack 31'; Markanday 39'	Stadium: Valley Parade; Attendance: 7,821; Referee: Ross Joyce

23 August 2022	Derby County (3)	1–0	West Bromwich Albion (2)	Derby
19:45	Sibley 15'	Report		Stadium: Pride Park Stadium; Attendance: 10,638; Referee: Robert Madley

23 August 2022	Fleetwood Town (3)	0–1	Everton (1)	Fleetwood
19:45		Report	Gray 28'	Stadium: Highbury Stadium; Attendance: 4,267; Referee: Tom Reeves

23 August 2022	Grimsby Town (4)	0–3	Nottingham Forest (1)	Grimsby
19:45		Report	Yates 18'; Surridge 35', 77'	Stadium: Blundell Park; Attendance: 8,418; Referee: Seb Stockbridge

23 August 2022	Rotherham United (2)	0–1	Morecambe (3)	Rotherham
19:45		Report	Gnahoua 72'	Stadium: New York Stadium; Attendance: 3,808; Referee: Peter Wright

23 August 2022	Stockport County (4)	0–0 (1–3 p)	Leicester City (1)	Edgeley
19:45		Report		Stadium: Edgeley Park; Attendance: 10,301; Referee: Sam Barrott
	Penalties
	Sarcevic (penalty missed); Quigley (penalty scored); Croasdale (penalty missed); Wootton (penalty missed)		(penalty scored) Tielemans; (penalty missed) Maddison; (penalty scored) Barnes; (penalty missed) Pérez; (penalty scored) Dewsbury-Hall

23 August 2022	Wolverhampton Wanderers (1)	2–1	Preston North End (2)	Wolverhampton
19:45	Jiménez 8'; Traoré 29'	Report	Woodburn 48'	Stadium: Molineux Stadium; Attendance: 21,946; Referee: Thomas Bramall

24 August 2022	Leeds United (1)	3–1	Barnsley (3)	Beeston
19:45	Sinisterra 21'; Klich 32' (pen.), 56'	Report	Andersen 35'	Stadium: Elland Road; Attendance: 35,472; Referee: John Brooks

24 August 2022	Tranmere Rovers (4)	1–2	Newcastle United (1)	Birkenhead
19:45	Nevitt 21'	Report	Lascelles 40'; Wood 52'	Stadium: Prenton Park; Attendance: 10,961; Referee: Anthony Backhouse

=== Southern section ===
23 August 2022	Walsall (4)	0–1	Charlton Athletic (3)	Walsall
19:00		Report	Jaiyesimi 57'	Stadium: Bescot Stadium; Attendance: 2,954; Referee: Ollie Yates

23 August 2022	Cambridge United (3)	0–3	Southampton (1)	Cambridge
19:45		Report	Adams 16', 55'; Ballard 88'	Stadium: Abbey Stadium; Attendance: 6,733; Referee: David Rock

23 August 2022	Colchester United (4)	0–2	Brentford (1)	Colchester
19:45		Report	Lewis-Potter 39'; Sørensen 90+1'	Stadium: Colchester Community Stadium; Attendance: 5,516; Referee: James Linington

23 August 2022	Crawley Town (4)	2–0	Fulham (1)	Crawley
19:45	Nichols 16'; Balagizi 49'	Report		Stadium: Broadfield Stadium; Attendance: 5,577; Referee: Lee Swabey

23 August 2022	Gillingham (4)	0–0 (6–5 p)	Exeter City (3)	Gillingham
19:45		Report		Stadium: Priestfield Stadium; Attendance: 2,127; Referee: Carl Brook
	Penalties
	Lee (penalty scored); Mandron (penalty scored); Wright (penalty scored); Reeves (penalty scored); Adelakun (penalty scored); Tutonda (penalty scored)		(penalty scored) J. Brown; (penalty scored) Cox; (penalty scored) Caprice; (penalty scored) Collins; (penalty scored) Coley; (penalty missed) Key

23 August 2022	Newport County (4)	3–2	Portsmouth (3)	Newport
19:45	Evans 14'; Wildig 49'; Waite 74'	Report	Curtis 9', 25'	Stadium: Rodney Parade; Attendance: 3,866; Referee: John Busby

23 August 2022	Norwich City (2)	2–2 (3–5 p)	Bournemouth (1)	Norwich
19:45	Hugill 22'; Idah 83'	Report	Marcondes 43'; Genesini 90+2'	Stadium: Carrow Road; Attendance: 20,647; Referee: Michael Salisbury
	Penalties
	Pukki (penalty scored); Cantwell (penalty missed); Gibbs (penalty scored); Idah (penalty scored)		(penalty scored) Marcondes; (penalty scored) Cook; (penalty scored) Anthony; (penalty scored) Saydee; (penalty scored) Christie

23 August 2022	Oxford United (3)	0–2	Crystal Palace (1)	Oxford
19:45		Report	Édouard 71'; Milivojević 90' (pen.)	Stadium: Kassam Stadium; Attendance: 9,564; Referee: Peter Bankes

23 August 2022	Stevenage (4)	1–0	Peterborough United (3)	Stevenage
19:45	Reid 90+3'	Report		Stadium: Lamex Stadium; Attendance: 2,292; Referee: Christopher Pollard

23 August 2022	Watford (2)	0–2	Milton Keynes Dons (3)	Watford
19:45		Report	Dennis 45'; Burns 53'	Stadium: Vicarage Road; Attendance: 8,891; Referee: Andy Woolmer

24 August 2022	Forest Green Rovers (3)	0–3	Brighton & Hove Albion (1)	Nailsworth
19:45		Report	Undav 38'; Alzate 45+1'; Ferguson 90+4'	Stadium: The New Lawn; Attendance: 3,812; Referee: Tim Robinson

24 August 2022	Wycombe Wanderers (3)	1–3	Bristol City (2)	High Wycombe
19:45	Al-Hamadi 50'	Report	Kadji 7'; Wilson 77'; Semenyo 90+3'	Stadium: Adams Park; Attendance: 3,116; Referee: Andy Davies

== Third round ==
A total of 32 teams played in the third round. Arsenal, Chelsea, Liverpool, Manchester City, Manchester United, Tottenham Hotspur, and West Ham United entered in this round due to their participation in either the 2022–23 UEFA Champions League, the 2022–23 UEFA Europa League, and the 2022–23 UEFA Europa Conference League. The draw was made on 24 August 2022. The third round consisted of 19 clubs from the Premier League, three from the Championship, six from League One and four from League Two. Ties were scheduled to be played in the week commencing 7 November 2022.

8 November 2022	Leicester City (1)	3–0	Newport County (4)	Leicester
19:45	Justin 44'; Vardy 70', 82'	Report		Stadium: King Power Stadium; Attendance: 15,081; Referee: Darren Bond

8 November 2022	Bournemouth (1)	4–1	Everton (1)	Boscombe
19:45	Lowe 7'; Stanislas 47'; Marcondes 78'; Anthony 82'	Report	Gray 67'	Stadium: Dean Court; Attendance: 10,021; Referee: Darren England

8 November 2022	Burnley (2)	3–1	Crawley Town (4)	Burnley
19:45	Barnes 24'; Zaroury 79', 90'	Report	Telford 22'	Stadium: Turf Moor; Attendance: 6,329; Referee: Sam Barrott

8 November 2022	Bristol City (2)	1–3	Lincoln City (3)	Ashton Gate
19:45	Conway 80'	Report	Virtue 6'; House 15'; O'Connor 49'	Stadium: Ashton Gate; Attendance: 7,961; Referee: Sam Allison

8 November 2022	Stevenage (4)	1–1 (4–5 p)	Charlton Athletic (3)	Stevenage
19:45	Norris 22' (pen.)	Report	Aneke 87'	Stadium: Lamex Stadium; Attendance: 3,515; Referee: Tom Nield
	Penalties
	Rose (penalty scored); Campbell (penalty scored); Sweeney (penalty scored); Bostwick (penalty scored); Taylor (penalty missed)		(penalty scored) Clare; (penalty scored) Forster-Caskey; (penalty scored) Rak-Sakyi; (penalty scored) Aneke; (penalty scored) Fraser

8 November 2022	Milton Keynes Dons (3)	2–0	Morecambe (3)	Bletchley
19:45	O'Hora 18'; Dennis 51'	Report		Stadium: Stadium MK; Attendance: 1,674; Referee: Ben Toner

8 November 2022	Brentford (1)	1–1 (5–6 p)	Gillingham (4)	Brentford
20:00	Toney 3'	Report	Mandron 75'	Stadium: Brentford Community Stadium; Attendance: 16,278; Referee: Tim Robinson
	Penalties
	Toney (penalty scored); Ghoddos (penalty scored); Dasilva (penalty scored); Mbeumo (penalty scored); Jensen (penalty scored); Damsgaard (penalty missed)		(penalty scored) Mandron; (penalty scored) Adelakun; (penalty scored) Wright; (penalty scored) Alexander; (penalty scored) Kashket; (penalty scored) MacDonald

9 November 2022	West Ham United (1)	2–2 (9–10 p)	Blackburn Rovers (2)	Stratford
19:45	Fornals 38'; Antonio 78'	Report	Vale 6'; Brereton 88'	Stadium: London Stadium; Attendance: 40,534; Referee: Thomas Bramall
	Penalties
	Benrahma (penalty scored); Bowen (penalty scored); Scamacca (penalty scored); Antonio (penalty scored); Lanzini (penalty scored); Johnson (penalty scored); Cresswell (penalty scored); Downes (penalty scored); Aguerd (penalty scored); Ogbonna (penalty missed)		(penalty scored) Brereton; (penalty scored) Hyam; (penalty scored) Dolan; (penalty scored) Buckley; (penalty scored) Szmodics; (penalty scored) Edun; (penalty scored) Rankin-Costello; (penalty scored) Carter; (penalty scored) Hirst; (penalty scored) Garrett

9 November 2022	Nottingham Forest (1)	2–0	Tottenham Hotspur (1)	West Bridgford
19:45	Lodi 50'; Lingard 57'	Report		Stadium: City Ground; Attendance: 28,384; Referee: Peter Bankes

9 November 2022	Newcastle United (1)	0–0 (3–2 p)	Crystal Palace (1)	Newcastle upon Tyne
19:45		Report		Stadium: St James' Park; Attendance: 51,660; Referee: Graham Scott
	Penalties
	Wood (penalty scored); Trippier (penalty scored); Joelinton (penalty scored); Botman (penalty missed); Bruno Guimarães (penalty missed)		(penalty missed) Milivojević; (penalty scored) Hughes; (penalty scored) Ward; (penalty missed) Mateta; (penalty missed) Ebiowei

9 November 2022	Southampton (1)	1–1 (6–5 p)	Sheffield Wednesday (3)	Southampton
19:45	Ward-Prowse 45+2' (pen.)	Report	Windass 24'	Stadium: St Mary's Stadium; Attendance: 20,457; Referee: John Brooks
	Penalties
	Ward-Prowse (penalty scored); Elyounoussi (penalty scored); Diallo (penalty scored); Maitland-Niles (penalty scored); A. Armstrong (penalty scored); Walcott (penalty scored)		(penalty scored) Smith; (penalty scored) Bannan; (penalty scored) Johnson; (penalty scored) Vaulks; (penalty scored) Gregory; (penalty missed) Iorfa

9 November 2022	Arsenal (1)	1–3	Brighton & Hove Albion (1)	Holloway
19:45	Nketiah 20'	Report	Welbeck 27' (pen.); Mitoma 58'; Lamptey 71'	Stadium: Emirates Stadium; Attendance: 59,233; Referee: Jarred Gillett

9 November 2022	Wolverhampton Wanderers (1)	1–0	Leeds United (1)	Wolverhampton
19:45	B. Traoré 85'	Report		Stadium: Molineux; Attendance: 24,246; Referee: Andre Marriner

9 November 2022	Liverpool (1)	0–0 (3–2 p)	Derby County (3)	Liverpool
20:00		Report		Stadium: Anfield; Attendance: 52,608; Referee: Tony Harrington
	Penalties
	Bajcetic (penalty missed); Oxlade-Chamberlain (penalty scored); Firmino (penalty missed); Núñez (penalty scored); Elliott (penalty scored)		(penalty scored) McGoldrick; (penalty missed) Hourihane; (penalty missed) Forsyth; (penalty scored) Sibley; (penalty missed) Dobbin

9 November 2022	Manchester City (1)	2–0	Chelsea (1)	Manchester
20:00	Mahrez 53'; Álvarez 58'	Report		Stadium: City of Manchester Stadium; Attendance: 52,148; Referee: Simon Hooper

10 November 2022	Manchester United (1)	4–2	Aston Villa (1)	Trafford
20:00	Martial 49'; Rashford 67'; Fernandes 78'; McTominay 90+1'	Report	Watkins 48'; Dalot 61' (o.g.)	Stadium: Old Trafford; Attendance: 72,512; Referee: David Coote

== Fourth round ==
A total of 16 teams played in the fourth round. League Two side Gillingham was the lowest-ranked team in the draw, which was made on 10 November 2022.

20 December 2022	Milton Keynes Dons (3)	0–3	Leicester City (1)	Bletchley
19:45		Report	Tielemans 18'; Pérez 29'; Vardy 50'	Stadium: Stadium MK; Attendance: 15,495; Referee: Andre Marriner

20 December 2022	Wolverhampton Wanderers (1)	2–0	Gillingham (4)	Wolverhampton
19:45	Jiménez 77' (pen.); Aït-Nouri 90+1'	Report		Stadium: Molineux; Attendance: 26,943; Referee: Michael Salisbury

20 December 2022	Southampton (1)	2–1	Lincoln City (3)	Southampton
19:45	Adams 25', 74'	Report	Bazunu 2' (o.g.)	Stadium: St Mary's Stadium; Attendance: 17,385; Referee: Jarred Gillett

20 December 2022	Newcastle United (1)	1–0	Bournemouth (1)	Newcastle upon Tyne
19:45	Smith 67' (o.g.)	Report		Stadium: St James' Park; Attendance: 51,579; Referee: John Brooks

21 December 2022	Blackburn Rovers (2)	1–4	Nottingham Forest (1)	Blackburn
19:45	S. Wharton 44'	Report	Johnson 13' (pen.), 90+2'; Lingard 53'; Awoniyi 79'	Stadium: Ewood Park; Attendance: 15,138; Referee: Robert Jones

21 December 2022	Charlton Athletic (3)	0–0 (4–3 p)	Brighton & Hove Albion (1)	Charlton
19:45		Report		Stadium: The Valley; Attendance: 17,464; Referee: Thomas Bramall
	Penalties
	Stockley (penalty missed); Forster-Caskey (penalty scored); Dobson (penalty missed); Rak-Sakyi (penalty missed); Blackett-Taylor (penalty scored); Sessegnon (penalty scored); Lavelle (penalty scored)		(penalty missed) Groß; (penalty missed) Trossard; (penalty scored) Ferguson; (penalty scored) Dunk; (penalty missed) March; (penalty scored) Lamptey; (penalty missed) Caicedo

21 December 2022	Manchester United (1)	2–0	Burnley (2)	Trafford
20:00	Eriksen 27'; Rashford 57'	Report		Stadium: Old Trafford; Attendance: 62,062; Referee: Graham Scott

22 December 2022	Manchester City (1)	3–2	Liverpool (1)	Manchester
20:00	Haaland 10'; Mahrez 47'; Aké 58'	Report	Carvalho 20'; Salah 48'	Stadium: City of Manchester Stadium; Attendance: 47,149; Referee: David Coote

== Quarter-finals ==
A total of eight teams played in the quarter-finals. League One side Charlton Athletic was the lowest-ranked team in the draw and the only non-Premier League team left.

10 January 2023	Manchester United (1)	3–0	Charlton Athletic (3)	Trafford
20:00 GMT	Antony 21'; Rashford 90', 90+4'	Report		Stadium: Old Trafford; Attendance: 74,345; Referee: Jarred Gillett

10 January 2023	Newcastle United (1)	2–0	Leicester City (1)	Newcastle upon Tyne
20:00 GMT	Burn 60'; Joelinton 72'	Report		Stadium: St James' Park; Attendance: 52,009; Referee: Darren England

11 January 2023	Nottingham Forest (1)	1–1 (4–3 p)	Wolverhampton Wanderers (1)	West Bridgford
19:45 GMT	Boly 18'	Report	Jiménez 64'	Stadium: City Ground; Attendance: 28,656; Referee: Graham Scott
	Penalties
	Surridge (penalty missed); Freuler (penalty scored); Worrall (penalty scored); Gibbs-White (penalty scored); Colback (penalty scored)		(penalty missed) Neves; (penalty scored) Podence; (penalty scored) Nunes; (penalty scored) Cunha; (penalty missed) Hodge

11 January 2023	Southampton (1)	2–0	Manchester City (1)	Southampton
20:00 GMT	Mara 23'; Djenepo 28'	Report		Stadium: St Mary's Stadium; Attendance: 22,996; Referee: Peter Bankes

== Semi-finals ==
A total of four teams, all of them from the Premier League, played in this round.

=== Summary ===
Team 1	Agg.	Team 2	1st leg	2nd leg
Nottingham Forest	0–5	Manchester United	0–3	0–2
Southampton	1–3	Newcastle United	0–1	1–2

25 January 2023
20:00 GMT

Nottingham Forest (1)	0–3	Manchester United (1)
	Report	Rashford 6'; Weghorst 45'; Fernandes 89'

City Ground, West Bridgford
Attendance: 29,325
Referee: Michael Oliver
1 February 2023
20:00 GMT

Manchester United (1)	2–0	Nottingham Forest (1)
Martial 73'; Fred 76'	Report

Old Trafford, Trafford
Attendance: 72,315
Referee: Peter Bankes

Manchester United won 5–0 on aggregate.

24 January 2023
20:00 GMT

Southampton (1)	0–1	Newcastle United (1)
	Report	Joelinton 73'

St Mary's Stadium, Southampton
Attendance: 30,090
Referee: Stuart Attwell
31 January 2023
20:00 GMT

Newcastle United (1)	2–1	Southampton (1)
Longstaff 5', 21'	Report	Adams 29'

St James' Park, Newcastle upon Tyne
Attendance: 51,975
Referee: Paul Tierney

Newcastle United won 3–1 on aggregate.

== Final ==
26 February 2023
16:30 GMT

Manchester United	2–0	Newcastle United
Casemiro 33'; Rashford 39'	Report

Wembley Stadium, London
Attendance: 87,306
Referee: David Coote (Nottinghamshire)

== Top goalscorers ==
Rank	Player	Club	Goals
1	(England) Marcus Rashford	Manchester United	6
2	(Scotland) Ché Adams	Southampton	5
3	(Scotland) Tommy Conway	Bristol City	3
3	(England) Andy Cook	Bradford City	3
3	(Republic of Ireland) Ronan Curtis	Portsmouth	3
3	(Mexico) Raúl Jiménez	Wolverhampton Wanderers	3
3	(England) Jamie Vardy	Leicester City	3
