= 2022–23 Barrow A.F.C. season =

Barrow
2022–23 season
- Chairman: Paul Hornby
- Manager: Pete Wild
- Stadium: Holker Street
- League Two: 9th
- FA Cup: First round
- EFL Cup: Second round
- EFL Trophy: Second round
- Top goalscorer: League: Josh Gordon (15); All: Josh Gordon (15)
- Highest home attendance: 4,622
- Lowest home attendance: 2,281
- Average home league attendance: 3,700
- Biggest win: 4-0 vs Crawley Town
- Biggest defeat: 5-0 vs Stevenage
Home colours	Away colours

The 2022–23 Barrow A.F.C. season was the 122nd edition of the football club and the club's third consecutive season in League Two. Outside the league, they contested the 2022–23 FA Cup, the 2022–23 EFL Cup and the 2022–23 EFL Trophy.

== Squad statistics ==
As of 8 May 2023

No.	Pos	Nat	Player	Total		League Two		FA Cup		League Cup		EFL Trophy	
No.	Pos	Nat	Player	Apps	Goals	Apps	Goals	Apps	Goals	Apps	Goals	Apps	Goals
1	GK	(England) ENG	Paul Farman	46	0	43+0	0	1+0	0	2+0	0	0+0	0
2	DF	(England) ENG	Connor Brown (left)	3	0	2+1	0	0+0	0	0+0	0	0+0	0
3	DF	(England) ENG	Patrick Brough	45	0	38+3	0	0+1	0	2+0	0	0+1	0
4	MF	(England) ENG	Jason Taylor	2	0	0+1	0	0+0	0	0+0	0	1+0	0
5	DF	(Northern Ireland) NIR	Sam McClelland	30	1	26+1	1	0+0	0	2+0	0	1+0	0
6	DF	(Republic of Ireland) IRL	Niall Canavan	50	2	46+0	2	1+0	0	2+0	0	1+0	0
7	MF	(England) ENG	Elliot Newby	17	0	10+7	0	0+0	0	0+0	0	0+0	0
7	MF	(England) ENG	John Rooney (left)	11	1	0+8	0	0+0	0	1+1	0	1+0	1
8	MF	(England) ENG	Solomon Nwabuokei (out on loan)	8	0	0+4	0	0+1	0	1+0	0	2+0	0
9	FW	(England) ENG	Billy Waters (left)	39	9	22+12	9	1+0	0	1+1	0	2+0	0
10	FW	(England) ENG	Josh Gordon	41	15	29+8	15	1+0	0	1+1	0	0+1	0
11	MF	(England) ENG	Josh Kay	37	5	23+11	4	1+0	0	1+0	0	1+0	1
12	GK	(England) ENG	Josh Lillis	5	0	2+1	0	0+0	0	0+0	0	2+0	0
13	MF	(England) ENG	Tom White	49	0	28+15	0	1+0	0	2+0	0	3+0	0
14	MF	(England) ENG	Harrison Neal	51	0	41+4	0	1+0	0	0+2	0	1+2	0
15	MF	(England) ENG	Robbie Gotts	40	1	28+8	1	0+0	0	1+1	0	1+1	0
16	MF	(Republic of Ireland) IRL	Sam Foley	43	1	24+15	0	0+1	0	1+0	0	1+1	1
17	FW	(England) ENG	Benni Smales-Braithwaite	4	0	0+2	0	0+0	0	0+0	0	1+1	0
19	DF	(Poland) POL	Paweł Żuk	3	0	0+1	0	0+0	0	0+0	0	2+0	0
20	FW	(England) ENG	Gerard Garner	16	2	10+6	2	0+0	0	0+0	0	0+0	0
20	DF	(England) ENG	Myles Kenlock (left)	13	0	5+3	0	1+0	0	0+1	0	3+0	0
21	DF	(England) ENG	Tyrell Warren	50	2	33+12	2	1+0	0	2+0	0	1+1	0
22	GK	(England) ENG	Scott Moloney	2	0	1+0	0	0+0	0	0+0	0	1+0	0
23	FW	(Zimbabwe) ZIM	David Moyo (out on loan)	19	1	4+10	0	1+0	0	1+0	1	3+0	0
24	DF	(Republic of Ireland) IRL	Rory Feely	10	0	7+3	0	0+0	0	0+0	0	0+0	0
25	DF	(Wales) WAL	George Ray	40	0	32+4	0	1+0	0	0+0	0	3+0	0
26	FW	(England) ENG	Richie Bennett (out on loan)	14	0	3+10	0	0+1	0	0+0	0	0+0	0
28	FW	(England) ENG	Jake Young	17	0	5+12	0	0+0	0	0+0	0	0+0	0
34	MF	(England) ENG	Ben Whitfield	50	6	39+6	5	0+1	0	1+1	1	0+2	0
35	MF	(England) ENG	Jordan Stevens (left)	18	2	4+9	2	0+0	0	1+1	0	3+0	0

== Transfers ==
=== In ===
Date	Pos	Player	Transferred from	Fee	Ref
23 June 2022	CF	(England) Richie Bennett	(England) Sutton United	Undisclosed	
27 June 2022	CB	(Wales) George Ray	(England) Exeter City	Free Transfer	
1 July 2022 (Note: The transfer was announced on 21 June, and would become official on July 1, once his Tranmere Rovers contract expired)	CM	(Republic of Ireland) Sam Foley	(England) Tranmere Rovers	Free Transfer	
1 July 2022 (Note: The transfer was announced on 14 June, and would become official on July 1, once his Woking contract expired)	CM	(England) Solomon Nwabuokei	(England) Woking	Free Transfer	
1 July 2022 (Note: The transfer was announced on 20 June, and would become official on July 1, once his FC Halifax Town contract expired)	RB	(England) Tyrell Warren	(England) FC Halifax Town	Free Transfer	
1 July 2022 (Note: The transfer was announced on 9 June, and would become official on July 1, once his FC Halifax Town contract expired)	SS	(England) Billy Waters	(England) FC Halifax Town	Free Transfer	
21 July 2022	LM	(England) Ben Whitfield	(England) Stockport County	Free Transfer	
2 August 2022	CF	(England) Benni Smales-Braithwaite	(England) Southampton	Free Transfer	
4 August 2022	LB	(England) Myles Kenlock	(England) Ipswich Town	Free Transfer	
8 August 2022	CF	(Zimbabwe) David Moyo	(Scotland) Hamilton Academical	Free Transfer	
22 August 2022	RB	(Poland) Paweł Żuk	(Poland) Ruch Chorzów	Free Transfer	
1 January 2023	RM	(England) Elliot Newby	(England) Stockport County	Undisclosed	
5 January 2023	RB	(Republic of Ireland) Rory Feely	(Republic of Ireland) Bohemian	Free Transfer	
31 January 2023	CF	(England) Gerard Garner	(England) Fleetwood Town	Undisclosed	

=== Out ===
Date	Pos	Player	Transferred to	Fee	Ref
11 June 2022	CF	(Republic of the Congo) Offrande Zanzala	(Wales) Newport County	Mutual Consent	
30 June 2022	CM	(England) Ollie Banks	(England) Chesterfield	Free Transfer	
30 June 2022	DM	(Australia) Tom Beadling	(Australia) Western Sydney Wanderers	Released	
30 June 2022	CM	(England) Mike Jones	(England) Chesterfield	Released	
30 June 2022	LB	(South Africa) Kgosi Ntlhe	(England) Scunthorpe United	Released	
30 June 2022	CB	(England) Matthew Platt	(England) Bradford City	Rejected Contract	
30 June 2022	CF	(France) Dimitri Sea	Unattached	Released	
30 June 2022	LW	(Wales) George Williams	(England) Boreham Wood	Released	
4 July 2022	CF	(England) Luke James	(England) York City	Free Transfer	
15 July 2022	RM	(Burundi) Remeao Hutton	(England) Swindon Town	Undisclosed	
28 July 2022	CB	(Wales) James Jones	(England) Altrincham	Free Transfer	
27 September 2022	AM	(England) John Rooney	(England) Oldham Athletic	Mutual Consent	
31 January 2023	RB	(England) Connor Brown	(England) Buxton'	Mutual Consent	
3 March 2023	AM	(England) Jordan Stevens	(England) Yeovil Town	Mutual Consent	
10 March 2023	LB	(England) Myles Kenlock	(England) Aldershot Town	Free Transfer	
22 March 2023	SS	(England) Billy Waters	(Wales) Wrexham	Undisclosed	

=== Loans in ===
Date	Pos	Player	Loaned from	On loan until	Ref
23 June 2022	CB	(Northern Ireland) Sam McClelland	(England) Chelsea	End of Season	
12 July 2022	MF	(England) Harrison Neal	(England) Sheffield United	End of Season	
14 January 2023	ST	(England) Jake Young	(England) Bradford City	End of Season	

=== Loans out ===
Date	Pos	Player	Loaned to	On loan until	Ref
8 July 2022	GK	(England) Scott Moloney	(England) Guiseley	30 August 2022	
9 August 2022	CB	(England) Joe Grayson	(Scotland) Dundee	18 January 2023 (Note: On 18 January, Grayson's loan at Dundee was terminated)	
20 August 2022	CF	(England) Benni Smales-Braithwaite	(England) Warrington Rylands	20 September 2022	
29 October 2022	CB	(England) Mark Ellis	(England) Torquay United	3 January 2023	
29 December 2022	CF	(Zimbabwe) David Moyo	(England) Barnet	End of Season	
6 January 2023	AM	(England) Solomon Nwabuokei	(England) Woking	End of Season	
20 January 2023	CF	(England) Benni Smales-Braithwaite	(England) Curzon Ashton	17 February 2023	
1 February 2023	CB	(England) Joe Grayson	(England) Stockport County	End of Season	
6 February 2023	CB	(England) Mark Ellis	(England) York City	End of Season	
10 February 2023	RB	(Poland) Pawel Zuk	(England) Lancaster City	10 March 2023	
24 February 2023	CF	(England) Benni Smales-Braithwaite	(England) Guiseley	24 March 2023	
2 March 2023	CF	(England) Richie Bennett	(England) Scunthorpe United	End of Season	

== Pre-season and friendlies ==
On May 26, Barrow announced their first pre-season fixture, against South Shields. Four days later, a trip to Witton Albion was added to the schedule. A third away friendly fixture, against Holker Old Boys was also confirmed. Shortly followed by a fourth, against Ashton United. On June 9, a home pre-season fixture against Fleetwood Town was confirmed. A second home pre-season match against fellow League Two side Salford City was later added to the calendar. The finalised schedule was announced with the addition of Penrith.

Win Draw Loss Fixtures

2 July 2022 Friendly	Holker Old Boys	1–3	Barrow	Barrow-in-Furness
13:00 BST	Paterson 39'	Report	Gordon 10'; Bennett 33'; Trialist 71'	Stadium: Rakesmoor

5 July 2022 Friendly	Ashton United	0–1	Barrow	Ashton-under-Lyne
19:30 BST		Report	McClelland 15'	Stadium: Hurst Cross; Attendance: 208

9 July 2022 Friendly	Penrith	0–8	Barrow	Penrith
15:00 BST		Report	Kay 45', 51', 61'; Warren 49'; Bennett 53'; Ellis 66'; Gordon 70', 88'	Stadium: Frenchfield

12 July 2022 Friendly	Witton Albion	1–4	Barrow	Northwich
19:45 BST	72'	Report	Waters 6'; Trialist 38'; Kay 70'; Ray 78'	Stadium: Wincham Park

16 July 2022 Friendly	South Shields	1–2	Barrow	South Shields
15:00 BST	Hodgson 71'	Report	Kay 23' (pen.); Neal 45+2'	Stadium: Mariners Park

19 July 2022 Friendly	Barrow	0–1	Fleetwood Town	Barrow-in-Furness
19:00 BST		Report	Batty 83'	Stadium: So Legal Stadium; Attendance: 1,100

25 November 2022 Friendly	Oldham Athletic	0–1	Barrow	Oldham
12:00 CET		Report		Stadium: Boundary Park; Attendance: 0 (Behind-closed-doors)

== Competitions ==
=== Overall record ===
Competition	First match	Last match	Starting round	Record							
Competition	First match	Last match	Starting round	Pld	W	D	L	GF	GA	GD	Win %
League Two	30 July 2022	May 2023	Matchday 1	16	9	1	6	24	17	+7	56.25
FA Cup	TBC	TBC	First round	0	0	0	0	0	0	+0	—
EFL Cup	9 August 2022	23 August 2022	First round	2	0	2	0	2	2	+0	0.00
EFL Trophy	30 August 2022	TBC	Group stage	3	1	1	1	4	3	+1	33.33
Total				21	10	4	7	30	22	+8	47.62

Last updated: 1 November 2022
Source: [ Soccerway]

=== League Two ===
==== League table ====
Pos	Team	Pld	W	D	L	GF	GA	GD	Pts	Promotion, qualification or relegation
6	Bradford City	46	20	16	10	61	43	+18	76	Qualification for League Two play-offs
7	Salford City	46	22	9	15	72	54	+18	75	Qualification for League Two play-offs
8	Mansfield Town	46	21	12	13	72	55	+17	75	
9	Barrow	46	18	8	20	47	53	−6	62	
10	Swindon Town	46	16	13	17	61	55	+6	61	
11	Grimsby Town	46	16	13	17	49	56	−7	61	
12	Tranmere Rovers	46	15	13	18	45	48	−3	58	

Source: EFL Official Website
Rules for classification: 1) Points; 2) Goal difference; 3) Number of goals scored; 4) Head-to-head results; 5) Wins; 6) Away goals; 7) Penalty points (sec 9.5); 8) 12-point sending off offences

==== Results summary ====
Overall								Home						Away					
Pld	W	D	L	GF	GA	GD	Pts	W	D	L	GF	GA	GD	W	D	L	GF	GA	GD
45	18	8	19	47	52	−5	62	12	3	7	29	18	+11	6	5	12	18	34	−16

Last updated: 29 April 2023.
Source: [ Soccerway]

==== Results by round ====
Round	1	2	3	4	5	6	7	8	9	10	11	12	13	14	15	16	17	18	19	20	21	22	23	24	25	26	27	28	29	30	31	32	33	34	35	36	37	38	39	40	41	42	43	44	45
Ground	A	H	A	H	H	A	A	H	A	H	A	H	A	A	H	H	H	A	H	A	H	A	H	H	A	A	H	A	A	H	A	A	H	H	A	H	A	H	H	A	H	A	A	H	A
Result	W	W	L	W	W	W	L	W	W	L	L	L	L	D	W	W	W	L	W	L	L	D	L	D	W	D	L	L	D	L	L	W	W	D	W	D	L	W	W	L	W	D	L	L	L
Position	6	4	6	5	3	2	3	3	2	4	6	9	11	11	8	5	4	5	4	4	5	7	9	10	6	8	9	9	10	12	14	12	11	11	10	10	10	10	9	9	9	9	9	9	9

Updated to match(es) played on 29 April 2023. Source: [ Soccerway]
A = Away; H = Home; W = Win; D = Draw; L = Loss; P = Postponed

==== Matches ====
Win Draw Loss Fixtures

On 23 June, the league fixtures were announced.

30 July 2022 1	Stockport County	2–3	Barrow	Edgeley
15:00 BST	Sarcevic 49'; Hippolyte (yellow card) 51'; Madden 70', (yellow card) 89'	Report	Gordon 6'; Neal (yellow card) 15'; Whitfield 20'; Waters 33'; Foley (yellow card) 45+3'; Warren (yellow card) 90+2'; Rooney (yellow card) 90+2'	Stadium: Edgeley Park; Attendance: 10,011; Referee: Ollie Yates

6 August 2022 2	Barrow	3–2	Bradford City	Barrow-in-Furness
15:00 BST	Warren (yellow card) 18'; Whitfield 63'; Kay 85'; Gordon 90+6'	Report	Crichlow (yellow card) 29'; Angol (yellow card) 58'; Young 65'; Cook 90+5'	Stadium: Holker Street; Attendance: 4,012; Referee: Martin Woods

13 August 2022 3	Sutton United	1–0	Barrow	Sutton
15:00 BST	Fadahunsi 79'	Report	Stevens (yellow card) 88'	Stadium: Gander Green Lane; Attendance: 2,276; Referee: Andy Davies

16 August 2022 4	Barrow	2–1	Walsall	Barrow-in-Furness
19:45 BST	Warren 9'; McClelland 12'; Gordon (yellow card) 90+4'	Report	Monthe (yellow card) 42'; Johnson 46'; Maher 62'	Stadium: Holker Street; Attendance: 3,435; Referee: Andy Haines

20 August 2022 5	Barrow	1–0	Harrogate Town	Barrow-in-Furness
15:00 BST	Kay (yellow card) 27'; Gordon 45'; Brough (yellow card) 81'; Waters (yellow card) 86'; Rooney (yellow card) 90+2'	Report	Mattock (yellow card) 17'; Ramsay (yellow card) 43'; Thomson (yellow card) 50'; Austerfield (yellow card) 90+2'	Stadium: Holker Street; Attendance: 3,068; Referee: Thomas Parsons

27 August 2022 6	AFC Wimbledon	0–1	Barrow	Wimbledon
15:00 BST	Marsh (yellow card) 30'; Brown (yellow card) 54'	Report	Gordon 10' (yellow card) 41'; Foley (yellow card) 31'	Stadium: Plough Lane; Attendance: 7,048; Referee: John Busby

3 September 2022 7	Northampton Town	3–1	Barrow	Northampton
15:00 BST	Hoskins 5'; Bowie 46'; Magloire 50' (yellow card) 90+8'; Leonard (yellow card) 54'; Koiki (yellow card) 90+6'; Guthrie (yellow card) 90+9'	Report	Gordon 13' (yellow card) 45'; Foley (yellow card) 26'; White (yellow card) 86'; Brough (yellow card) 90+8'	Stadium: Sixfields Stadium; Attendance: 4,605; Referee: Tom Reeves

10 September 2022	Barrow	Postponed	Colchester United	Barrow-in-Furness
15:00 BST				Stadium: Holker Street
Note: Fixture was postponed as a mark of respect following the passing of Queen Elizabeth II.

13 September 2022 8	Barrow	2–0	Doncaster Rovers	Barrow-in-Furness
19:45 BST	Kay (yellow card) 14'; Whitfield 37'; Warren 78'	Report	Clayton (yellow card) 34'; Tomlin (yellow card) 54'	Stadium: Holker Street; Attendance: 3,295; Referee: Scott Oldham

17 September 2022 9	Newport County	0–2	Barrow	Newport
15:00 BST	Moriah-Welsh (yellow card) 42'	Report	Gordon (yellow card) 32' (goal) 45', 59' (pen.)	Stadium: Rodney Parade; Attendance: 3,793; Referee: James Oldham

24 September 2022 10	Barrow	0–2	Leyton Orient	Barrow-in-Furness
15:00 BST	Kay (red card) 87'	Report	Pratley (yellow card) 30'; Smyth 36'; El Mizouni 75'; Happe (yellow card) 82'; Archibald (yellow card) 86'; Brown (yellow card) 90+8'	Stadium: Holker Street; Attendance: 4,629; Referee: Martin Coy

1 October 2022 11	Tranmere Rovers	1–0	Barrow	Birkenhead
15:00 BST	Merrie (yellow card) 19'; Hawkes 25'	Report	Stevens (yellow card) 87'; Foley (yellow card) 90+3'	Stadium: Prenton Park; Attendance: 6,123; Referee: Sam Purkiss

8 October 2022 12	Barrow	0–1	Mansfield Town	Barrow-in-Furness
15:00 BST	White (yellow card) 73'	Report	Clarke (yellow card) 32'; Harbottle (yellow card) 34'; Bowery 50'; O'Toole (yellow card) 75'	Stadium: Holker Street; Attendance: 3,713; Referee: Tom Nield

15 October 2022 13	Rochdale	2–1	Barrow	Rochdale
15:00 BST	Kelly 18'; Diagouraga (yellow card) 28'; Quigley 75'; Ball (yellow card) 90'; O'Donnell (yellow card) 90+6'	Report	Warren (yellow card) 85'; Canavan 89' (yellow card) 90+7'	Stadium: Spotland Stadium; Attendance: 3,061; Referee: Sunny Sukhvir Gill

22 October 2022 14	Gillingham	1–1	Barrow	Gillingham
15:00 BST	Baggott 74'	Report	Ray (yellow card) 9'; Kay 35' (penalty missed) 55'; Canavan (yellow card) 75'	Stadium: Priestfield Stadium; Attendance: 5,034; Referee: Carl Boyeson

25 October 2022 15	Barrow	1–0	Grimsby Town	Barrow-in-Furness
19:45 BST	Brough (yellow card) 31'; Kay (penalty missed) 39'; Canavan (yellow card) 51'; Waters 75'	Report	Waterfall (yellow card) 51'; Hunt (yellow card) 90+3'	Stadium: Holker Street; Attendance: 3,301; Referee: Ben Toner

29 October 2022 16	Barrow	3–0	Crewe Alexandra	Barrow-in-Furness
15:00 BST	Waters 8'; Gordon 43' 60' (yellow card) 67'; Stevens (yellow card) 90'; Kenlock (yellow card) 90+2'	Report	Williams (yellow card) 66'; Sambou (yellow card) 72'	Stadium: Holker Street; Attendance: 3,167; Referee: Marc Edwards

1 November 2022 17	Barrow	3–1	Colchester United	Barrow-in-Furness
19:45 GMT	Waters 22' 25' 46'; Farman (yellow card) 84'; Moyo (yellow card) 89'	Report	Sears 90+1'; Tchamadeu (yellow card) 90+5'	Stadium: Holker Street; Attendance: 3,224; Referee: Darren Bond

12 November 2022 18	Crawley Town	1–0	Barrow	Crawley
15:00 GMT	Nadesan 6'; Lynch (yellow card) 46'; Hessenthaler (yellow card) 90+5'	Report	Ray (yellow card) 59'; White (yellow card) 90'	Stadium: Broadfield Stadium; Attendance: 2,588; Referee: Carl Brook

19 November 2022 19	Barrow	3–1	Hartlepool United	Barrow-in-Furness
15:00 GMT	Gordon 4'; Whitfield 8'; Waters 21'	Report	Hastie (yellow card) 17'; Tumilty (yellow card) 43'; Cooke (yellow card) 47'; Missilou 77'; Sylla (yellow card) 90+4'	Stadium: Holker Street; Attendance: 3,284; Referee: Leigh Doughty

2 December 2022 20	Stevenage	5–0	Barrow	Stevenage
19:45 GMT	Reeves 18'; Reid 50'; Gilbey (yellow card) 63'; James-Wildin (yellow card) 65'; Sweeney 75'; Norris 78' (pen.); Warren 86' (o.g.)	Report	Ray (yellow card) 40'	Stadium: Broadhall Way; Attendance: 2,756; Referee: Matt Donohue

10 December 2022	Carlisle United	Postponed	Barrow	Carlisle
15:00 GMT				Stadium: Brunton Park
Note: Fixture was postponed due to a frozen pitch.

17 December 2022 21	Barrow	0–1	Swindon Town	Barrow-in-Furness
15:00 GMT	Farman (yellow card) 5'	Report	Reed 7' (pen.); MacDonald (yellow card) 33'; Shade (yellow card) 45'; Hutton (yellow card) 72'	Stadium: Holker Street; Attendance: 2,617; Referee: Robert Lewis

26 December 2022 22	Salford City	1–1	Barrow	Salford
15:00 GMT	Smith 26'; Hendry (red card) 37'; Galbraith (yellow card) 58'; Vassell (yellow card) 90+3'	Report	Ray (yellow card) 54'; Neal (yellow card) 61'; Warren (yellow card) 64'; Stevens 79'	Stadium: Moor Lane; Attendance: 2,881; Referee: Thomas Parsons

29 December 2022 23	Barrow	1–2	Tranmere Rovers	Barrow-in-Furness
19:45 GMT	Stevens 38'; Gordon (yellow card) 90+3'	Report	Turnbull 6'; Lewis (red card) 76'; Hemmings 82'	Stadium: Holker Street; Attendance: 3,383; Referee: Tom Reeves

2 January 2023 24	Barrow	0–0	Rochdale	Barrow-in-Furness
15:00 GMT	Whitfield (yellow card) 66'	Report	Quigley (yellow card) 35'; Ball (yellow card) 77'; Sinclair (yellow card) 90+5'	Stadium: Holker Street; Attendance: 3,055; Referee: Scott Oldham

7 January 2023 25	Mansfield Town	2–3	Barrow	Mansfield
15:00 GMT	McLaughlin 9'; Quinn 25'; Maris (yellow card) 64'	Report	Gotts (yellow card) 36'; Waters 45+1'; Gordon 49'; Ray (yellow card) 58'; Foley (yellow card) 74'; Hawkins 77' (o.g.)	Stadium: Field Mill; Attendance: 6,081; Referee: Neil Hair

14 January 2023 26	Leyton Orient	0–0	Barrow	Leyton
15:00 GMT	Turns (yellow card) 22'; James (yellow card) 90+1' (yellow-red card) 90+4'	Report	Neal (yellow card) 30'; Brough (yellow card) 49'	Stadium: Brisbane Road; Attendance: 7,755; Referee: Leigh Doughty

21 January 2023	Barrow	Postponed	Salford City	Barrow-in-Furness
15:00 GMT				Stadium: Holker Street
Note: Fixture was postponed on referee's Sam Barrott decision.

28 January 2023 27	Barrow	0–2	Northampton Town	Barrow
15:00 GMT	Foley (yellow card) 90+7'	Report	Leonard (yellow card) 34'; Fox 54'; McWilliams 85'; Magloire (yellow card) 89'	Stadium: Holker Street; Attendance: 3,002; Referee: Darren Drysdale

31 January 2023 28	Carlisle United	5–1	Barrow	Carlisle
19:45 GMT	Mellish 44', 67', (yellow card) 75'; Garner 50'; Patrick 72'; Dennis 89' (pen.); Gibson (yellow card) 90+2'	Report	Ray (yellow card) 34'; Gotts (yellow card) 56'; Barclay 84' (o.g.)	Stadium: Brunton Park; Attendance: 9,351; Referee: Andrew Kitchen

4 February 2023 29	Colchester United	1–1	Barrow	Colchester
15:00 GMT	Akinde (penalty missed) 66', (yellow card) 90+3'; Ashley (yellow card) 75'; Hopper (yellow card) 76'; Appiah 90+6'	Report	Feely (yellow card) 46'; Whitfield 57'; Farman (yellow card) 66'; Garner (yellow card) 73'; Foley (yellow card) 74'	Stadium: JobServe Community Stadium; Attendance: 3,203; Referee: Ben Speedie

11 February 2023 30	Barrow	0–1	Newport County	Barrow-in-Furness
15:00 GMT	Neal (yellow card) 55'; Feely (red card) 81'	Report	Demetriou (yellow card) 15', (goal) 90+5'; Lewis (yellow card) 50'; Charsley (yellow card) 78'	Stadium: So Legal Stadium; Attendance: 2,804; Referee: Seb Stockbridge

14 February 2023 31	Doncaster Rovers	1–0	Barrow	Doncaster
19:45 GMT	Maxwell 18', (yellow card) 57'	Report	Gotts (yellow card) 54'; Neal (yellow card) 90+6'	Stadium: The Eco-Power Stadium; Attendance: 5,496 (164 away fans); Referee: Thomas Kirk

18 February 2023 32	Bradford City	0–1	Barrow	Bradford
15:00 GMT	Walker (yellow card) 37'; Smallwood (yellow card) 39'	Report	Kay 25'; Gotts (yellow card) 62'; Newby (yellow card) 89'; Foley (yellow card) 90+3'; Farman (yellow card) 90+4'	Stadium: University of Bradford Stadium; Attendance: 17,071 (511 away); Referee: Carl Boyeson

25 February 2023 33	Barrow	1–0	Stockport County	Barrow-in-Furness
15:00 GMT	Garner (yellow card) 45+1'; Kay 69'	Report	Stretton (yellow card) 90+5'	Stadium: So Legal Stadium; Attendance: 4,164 (625 away); Referee: Ollie Yates

28 February 2023 34	Barrow	1–1	Salford City	Barrow-in-Furness
19:45 GMT	Kay (yellow card) 20'; Vassell 70' (o.g.)	Report	Watson 12' (pen.); Bolton (yellow card) 59'; Touray (yellow card) 62'; Leak (yellow card) 83'	Stadium: So Legal Stadium; Attendance: 3,076; Referee: Scott Oldham

5 March 2023 35	Walsall	0–1	Barrow	Bescot
15:00 GMT	Daniels (yellow card) 72'; Maddox (yellow card) 90+2'	Report	Waters 22'; Young (yellow card) 39'; Foley (yellow card) 56'	Stadium: Poundland Bescot Stadium; Attendance: 5,018; Referee: Lee Swabey

11 March 2023 36	Barrow	0–0	Sutton United	Barrow-in-Furness
15:00 GMT	Neal (yellow card) 20'	Report		Stadium: So Legal Stadium; Attendance: 3,696; Referee: Oliver Langford

18 March 2023 37	Harrogate Town	1–0	Barrow	Harrogate
15:00 GMT	Daly 74'; Pattison (yellow card) 90+1'	Report	Whitfield (yellow card) 90+4'	Stadium: The EnviroVent Stadium; Attendance: 2,343 (514 away); Referee: Will Finnie

25 March 2023 38	Barrow	2–1	AFC Wimbledon	Barrow-in-Furness
15:00 GMT	Neal (yellow card) 58'; Canavan 61'; Whitfield (yellow card) 62'; Gordon 74'	Report	Jenkins 5'; Ogundere (yellow card) 24'; Currie (yellow card) 55'; Little (yellow card) 90+7'	Stadium: So Legal Stadium; Attendance: 3,794; Referee: Sam Allison

1 April 2023 39	Barrow	2–1	Gillingham	Barrow-in-Furness
15:00 BST	Morris 9' (o.g.); Neal (yellow card) 15'; Kay (yellow card) 66'; Gotts 90+4'	Report	O'Brien (yellow card) 45+2'; Masterson 82'; Nichols (yellow card) 87'	Stadium: So Legal Stadium; Attendance: 3,703; Referee: Darren Handley

7 April 2023 40	Crewe Alexandra	3–0	Barrow	Crewe
15:00 BST	Agyei 14' (pen.), 33' (pen.), (yellow card) 52'; O'Riordan (yellow card) 37'; Thomas (yellow card) 45+4'; Adebisi (yellow card) 79'; Long (yellow card) 88', (goal) 89'	Report	Ray (yellow card) 12'; Warren (yellow card) 43'	Stadium: Mornflake Stadium; Attendance: 4,831; Referee: Sam Purkiss

10 April 2023 41	Barrow	4–0	Crawley Town	Barrow-in-Furness
15:00 BST	Gordon 18', 47', 55' (pen.); Garner (yellow card) 24', (goal) 81'; Brough (yellow card) 58'; Neal (yellow card) 63'; Warren (yellow card) 73'	Report	Johnson (yellow card) 54'; Oteh (yellow card) 87'	Stadium: So Legal Stadium; Attendance: 3,335; Referee: Adam Herczeg

15 April 2023 42	Swindon Town	0–0	Barrow	Swindon
15:00 BST		Report	Brough (yellow card) 68'; Gotts (yellow card) 76'	Stadium: The County Ground; Attendance: 8,080 (147 Barrow fans); Referee: Paul Howard

18 April 2023 43	Grimsby Town	1–0	Barrow	Cleethorpes
19:45 BST	Emmanuel (yellow card) 72'; Orsi 77'	Report	Young (yellow card) 1'; Gotts (yellow card) 26'	Stadium: Blundell Park; Attendance: 4,902; Referee: Lewis Smith

22 April 2023 44	Barrow	0–1	Carlisle United	Barrow-in-Furness
15:00 BST	Gordon (yellow card) 36'; Brough (yellow card) 57'; Canavan (yellow card) 86'; Farman (yellow card) 87'; Pete Wild (yellow card) off the pitch'		Barclay 16'; Huntington (yellow card) 57'; Devitt (yellow card) 86'	Stadium: So Legal Stadium; Attendance: 4,515; Referee: James Bell

29 April 2023 45	Hartlepool United	3–1	Barrow	Hartlepool
15:00 BST	Hamilton (yellow card) 25', (goal) 42'; Sterry 68'; Crawford (yellow card) 82'; Jennings 90+4'	Report	Garner 21'; White (yellow card) 59'; Neal (yellow card) 73' (yellow-red card) 79'; Brough (yellow card) 90+7' (yellow-red card) 90+7'; Farman (yellow card) 90+7'	Stadium: The Suit Direct Stadium; Attendance: 4,551; Referee: Simon Mather

8 May 2023 46	Barrow	0–1	Stevenage	Barrow-in-Furness
15:00 BST		Report	Reeves 25'	Stadium: Holker Street; Attendance: 4,034; Referee: Andrew Kitchen

=== FA Cup ===
Barrow were drawn at home to Mansfield Town in the first round.

Win Draw Loss Fixtures

5 November 2022 First round	Barrow	0–1	Mansfield Town	Barrow-in-Furness
15:00 BST	White (yellow card) 62'; Bennett (yellow card) 87'	Report	Hartigan (yellow card) 35'; Hawkins 39'; Perch (yellow card) 73'; Hewitt (yellow card) 81'	Stadium: Furness Building Society Stadium; Attendance: 2,501; Referee: Andy Haines

=== EFL Cup ===
Win Draw Loss Fixtures

9 August 2022 First round	Blackpool	0–0 (3–4 p)	Barrow	Blackpool
19:45 BST	Lubala (yellow card) 83'	Report	Gordon (yellow card) 41'; Foley (yellow card) 75'; Neal (yellow card) 90+5'; Farman (yellow card) 90+7'	Stadium: Bloomfield Road; Attendance: 4,972; Referee: Ben Speedie
	Penalties
	Connolly (penalty missed); Husband (penalty scored); Lubala (penalty scored); Lavery (penalty scored); Fiorini (penalty missed)		Rooney (penalty scored); Kay (penalty scored); Waters (penalty scored); Brough (penalty scored); Neal (penalty missed)

23 August 2022 Second round	Barrow	2–2 (1–3 p)	Lincoln City	Barrow-in-Furness
19:45 BST	Moyo 13'; Whitfield 87'; Gordon (yellow card) 89'	Report	Scully 8'; Eyoma (yellow card) 15'; Sørensen (yellow card) 18'; Garrick 90+2'	Stadium: Holker Street; Attendance: 3,011; Referee: Simon Mather
	Penalties
	Whitfield (penalty scored); Gordon (penalty missed); Brough (penalty missed); Gotts (penalty missed)		Scully (penalty scored); Sanders (penalty scored); Oakley-Boothe (penalty scored)

=== EFL Trophy ===
On 20 June, the initial Group stage draw was made, grouping Barrow with Carlisle United and Fleetwood Town. In the second round, Barrow were drawn away to Bolton Wanderers.

Pos	Div	Team	Pld	W	PW	PL	L	GF	GA	GD	Pts	Qualification
1	ACA	Manchester United U21	3	2	0	1	0	6	4	+2	7	Advance to Round 2
2	L2	Barrow	3	1	1	0	1	4	3	+1	5	Advance to Round 2
3	L1	Fleetwood Town	3	0	1	2	0	4	4	0	4	
4	L2	Carlisle United	3	0	1	0	2	2	5	−3	2	

Source: EFL.com

Win Draw Loss Fixtures

30 August 2022 Group stage	Fleetwood Town	1–1 (3–4 p)	Barrow	Fleetwood
19:00 BST	Wiredu 30'; Johnston (yellow card) 43'; Omochere (yellow card) 49'	Report	Rooney 44' (yellow card) 86'; Żuk (yellow card) 72'	Stadium: Highbury Stadium; Attendance: 866; Referee: Thomas Kirk
	Penalties
	Johnston (penalty missed); McMillan (penalty scored); Omochere (penalty scored); Garner (penalty scored); Glenfield (penalty missed)		Rooney (penalty scored); Whitfield (penalty scored); Neal (penalty scored); Kenlock (penalty missed); Gotts (penalty scored)

4 October 2022 Group stage	Barrow	1–2	Manchester United U21s	Barrow-in-Furness
19:30 BST	Moloney (yellow card) 43'; Fredricson 51' (o.g.)	Report	Fredricson (yellow card) 19'; McNeill 44' (pen.); Bennett (yellow card) 50'; Gore (yellow card) 50'; Garnacho 90+2' (yellow card) 90+3'	Stadium: Holker Street; Attendance: 2,966; Referee: Geoff Eltringham

18 October 2022 Group stage	Barrow	2–0	Carlisle United	Barrow-in-Furness
19:00 BST	Neal (yellow card) 45'; Kay 70'; Foley 80'	Report	Charters (yellow card) 90'	Stadium: Holker Street; Attendance: 2,281; Referee: Seb Stocksbridge

22 November 2022 Second round	Bolton Wanderers	3–2	Barrow	Horwich
19:45 GMT	Afolayan 23'; Böðvarsson 38'; Kachunga 69'	Report	Neal (yellow card) 18'; Kay 42'; Canavan 56'; Ray (yellow card) 73'	Stadium: University of Bolton Stadium; Attendance: 2,381; Referee: Rebecca Welch
