= Benni Smales-Braithwaite =

English footballer (born 2002)

Personal information
- Date of birth: 29 April 2002 (age 24)
- Height: 1.85 m (6 ft 1 in)
- Position: Striker

Team information
- Current team: Flixton

Youth career
- Manchester City
- 2018–2021: Southampton

Senior career*
Years	Team	Apps	(Gls)
2021–2022	Southampton	0	(0)
2021	→ Gloucester City (loan)	6	(0)
2022–2023	Barrow	2	(0)
2022	→ Warrington Rylands 1906 (loan)	3	(0)
2022–2023	→ Curzon Ashton (loan)	4	(1)
2023	→ Guiseley (loan)	6	(4)
2023–2025	Vendsyssel	11	(0)
2024	→ 07 Vestur (loan)	14	(3)
2024	→ Skive (loan)	2	(0)
2025–2026	Stalybridge Celtic	56	(9)
2026–	Flixton		

International career
2017	England U17	1	(0)
- * Club domestic league appearances and goals as of 14:29, 21 August 2026 (UTC)

Benni Smales-Braithwaite (born 29 April 2002) is an English professional footballer who plays as a striker for Flixton.

== Career ==
Smales-Braithwaite played youth football for Manchester City and Southampton, turning professional in June 2019, before spending time on loan at non-league club Gloucester City,

He signed for Barrow in August 2022. Later that month he moved on loan to Warrington Rylands 1906.

On 18 November 2022, Smales-Braithwaite joined National League North side Curzon Ashton on a one-month loan deal. In January 2023, he extended his contract with Barrow until the end of the season and extended his loan with Curzon Ashton. He moved on loan to Guiseley in February 2023. He was released after one season at Barrow, but was invited back for pre-season.

In July 2023 Smales-Braithwaite went on trial at Danish 1st Division club Vendsyssel FF. He was included in Vendsyssel's match squad for the opening match against SønderjyskE on 21 July 2023, where he made his debut after coming off the bench. On 31 January 2024, Smales-Braithwaite joined Faroe Islands Premier League side 07 Vestur on loan until June 2024.

On 13 September 2024 Smales-Bratihwaite was loaned out again, to Danish 2nd Division club Skive IK for the remainder of 2024. After only 70 minutes of playing time, Smales-Braithwaite returned to Vendsyssel in December 2024.

In January 2025 he returned to England, signing for Stalybridge Celtic.

In September 2026 he moved to Flixton.

== Career statistics ==
As of 8 May 2023

Appearances and goals by club, season and competition
Club	Season	League			FA Cup		League Cup		Other		Total	
Club	Season	Division	Apps	Goals	Apps	Goals	Apps	Goals	Apps	Goals	Apps	Goals
Southampton	2021–22	Premier League	0	0	0	0	0	0	0	0	0	0
Gloucester City (loan)	2021–22	National League North	6	0	0	0	0	0	0	0	6	0
Barrow	2022–23	League Two	2	0	0	0	0	0	2 (Note: Appearances in the EFL Trophy.)	0	4	0
Warrington Rylands (loan)	2022–23	Northern Premier League	3	0	1	0	0	0	0	0	4	0
Curzon Ashton (loan)	2022–23	National League North	4	1	0	0	0	0	3 (Note: 2 appearances in the FA Trophy & 1 in Lancashire Senior Cup)	4	7	5
Guiseley (loan)	2022–23	National League North	6	4	0	0	0	0	0	0	6	4
Career total			21	5	1	0	0	0	5	4	27	9
