= Scott Moloney =

English footballer

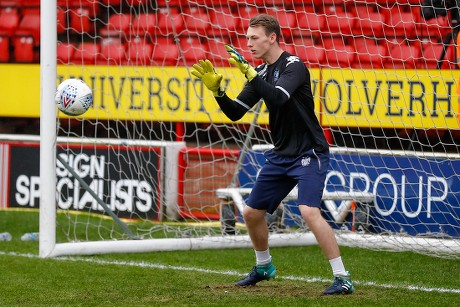
- Scott Moloney warming up before Walsall v Bury, EFL Trophy - 02 Dec 2017

Personal information
- Full name: Scott Gavin Moloney
- Date of birth: 15 April 2000 (age 26)
- Place of birth: Ashton-under-Lyne, England
- Height: 6 ft 1 in (1.85 m)
- Position: Goalkeeper

Team information
- Current team: Stafford Rangers

Youth career
- Hartlepool United
- Bury

Senior career*
Years	Team	Apps	(Gls)
2017–2020	Bury	2	(0)
2018	→ Skelmersdale United (loan)	2	(0)
2020–2023	Barrow	3	(0)
2022	→ South Shields (loan)	3	(0)
2022	→ Guiseley (loan)	0	(0)
2022	→ Guiseley (loan)	0	(0)
2023–2024	Nantwich Town	28	(0)
2024	FC United of Manchester	2	(0)
2024–2025	Oldham Athletic	0	(0)
2025	→ Rushall Olympic (loan)	8	(0)
2025–2026	Bootle	1	(0)
2026	Stafford Rangers	14	(0)
- * Club domestic league appearances and goals as of 11:05, 10 October 2025 (UTC)

Scott Gavin Moloney (born 15 April 2000) is an English professional footballer who most recently played as a goalkeeper for Northern Premier League Division One West club Stafford Rangers.

== Playing career ==
=== Early career ===
Moloney spent time with Hartlepool United before moving on to Bury. Having spent 21 games as an unused substitute following an injury to Joe Murphy, Moloney joined Skelmersdale United on loan on 7 September 2018. He played two Northern Premier League Division One West games for the "Blueboys", featuring in defeats to Radcliffe and Trafford.

=== Barrow ===
He was signed by EFL League Two club Barrow on 17 September 2020; manager David Dunn signed him to provide competition for Joel Dixon and Josh Lillis. He signed a new one-year contract in July 2021. He made his professional debut on 31 August 2021, in a 2–2 draw at Accrington Stanley in an EFL Trophy group stage game; Barrow lost the resulting penalty shoot-out 5–4. On 12 January 2022, Moloney joined Northern Premier League Premier Division side South Shields on a one-month loan deal, making three appearances. On 25 March 2022, he went out on loan for a further month to National League North side Guiseley. The deal was later extended until the end of the season. In July 2022, Moloney returned to Guiseley on loan until January 2023 following their relegation but was recalled by Barrow on 30 August 2022. He was released at the end of the 2022–23 season.

=== Non-League ===
Following his departure from Barrow, Moloney joined Northern Premier League Division One West club Nantwich Town. He departed the club in March 2024, joining FC United of Manchester.

In August 2024, Moloney signed for National League club Oldham Athletic on a one-year deal following a successful trial period. In March 2025, he joined National League North club Rushall Olympic on loan for the remainder of the season.

In October 2025, Moloney joined Northern Premier League Division One West club Bootle.

In January 2026, Moloney joined Northern Premier League Division One West club Stafford Rangers. However, in May Moloney left the club to pursue opportunities elsewhere higher up the non league pyramid.

== Statistics ==
As of end of 2024–25 season

Club	Season	League			FA Cup		EFL Cup		Other		Total	
Club	Season	Division	Apps	Goals	Apps	Goals	Apps	Goals	Apps	Goals	Apps	Goals
Bury	2017–18	EFL League One	0	0	0	0	0	0	0	0	0	0
Bury	2018–19	EFL League Two	0	0	0	0	0	0	0	0	0	0
Bury	Total		0	0	0	0	0	0	0	0	0	0
Skelmersdale United (loan)	2018–19	Northern Premier League Division One West	2	0	0	0	0	0	0	0	2	0
Barrow	2020–21	EFL League Two	0	0	0	0	0	0	0	0	0	0
Barrow	2021–22	EFL League Two	0	0	0	0	0	0	2 (Note: Appearance(s) and goal(s) in the EFL Trophy.)	0	2	0
Barrow	2022–23	EFL League Two	1	0	0	0	0	0	1	0	2	0
Total			1	0	0	0	0	0	3	0	4	0
South Shields (loan)	2021–22	Northern Premier League	3	0	0	0	0	0	0	0	3	0
Guiseley (loan)	2021–22	National League North	0	0	0	0	0	0	0	0	0	0
Guiseley (loan)	2022–23	Northern Premier League	0	0	0	0	0	0	0	0	0	0
Nantwich Town	2023–24	NPL Division One West	20	0	5	0	—		4 (Note: Appearance(s) in FA Trophy)	0	29	0
FC United of Manchester	2023–24	NPL Premier Division	2	0	—		—		0	0	2	0
Oldham Athletic	2024–25	National League	0	0	0	0	—		0	0	0	0
Rushall Olympic (loan)	2024–25	National League North	6	0	—		—		0	0	6	0
Career total			34	0	5	0	0	0	7	0	46	0
