= Solomon Nwabuokei =

English footballer (born 1996)

Personal information
- Full name: Solomon Chukwuelozona Nwabuokei
- Date of birth: 23 February 1996 (age 30)
- Place of birth: England
- Height: 1.90 m (6 ft 3 in)
- Position: Midfielder

Senior career*
Years	Team	Apps	(Gls)
2016–2018	Enfield Borough	51	(22)
2018–2019	Biggleswade Town		
2019–2021	St Albans City	37	(5)
2021–2022	Woking	41	(0)
2022–2023	Barrow	4	(0)
2023	→ Woking (loan)	17	(0)
2023–2025	Eastleigh	40	(2)
- * Club domestic league appearances and goals as of 12:52, 8 May 2025 (UTC)

Solomon Chukwuelozona Nwabuokei (born 23 February 1996) is an English professional footballer who last played as a midfielder for National League club Eastleigh.

== Career ==
After playing non-league football for Enfield Borough, Biggleswade Town, St Albans City and Woking, Nwabuokei signed for Barrow in June 2022. On 23 August 2022, he made his debut for the club during an EFL Cup second round tie against Lincoln City, featuring for just over an hour in the 2–2 draw. In January 2023 he re-joined Woking on loan. He was released by Barrow at the end of the 2022–23 season.

On 30 June 2023, Nwabuokei agreed to join National League side Eastleigh following his departure from Barrow. He departed the club upon the expiration of his contract at the end of the 2024–25 season.

== Career statistics ==
As of end of 2024–25 season

Appearances and goals by club, season and competition
Club	Season	League			FA Cup		EFL Cup		Other		Total	
Club	Season	Division	Apps	Goals	Apps	Goals	Apps	Goals	Apps	Goals	Apps	Goals
Enfield Borough	2016–17	Spartan South Midlands League Division Two	23	12	—		—		5 (Note: Four appearances and one goal in the Spartan South Midlands League Challenge Trophy, one appearance in the Spartan South Midlands League Division Two Cup.)	1	28	13
Enfield Borough	2017–18	Spartan South Midlands League Division One	28	10	—		—		6 (Note: Three appearances and one goal in the Spartan South Midlands League Division One Cup, three appearances in the FA Vase.)	1	34	11
Enfield Borough	Total		51	22	—		—		11	2	62	24
Biggleswade Town	2018–19	Southern League Premier Division Central	No data currently available									
St Albans City	2019–20	National League South	26	1	3	1	—		1 (Note: Appearances in the FA Trophy.)	0	30	2
St Albans City	2020–21	National League South	11	4	3	0	—		2	0	16	4
St Albans City	Total		37	5	6	1	—		3	0	46	6
Woking	2021–22	National League	41	0	1	0	—		0	0	42	0
Barrow	2022–23	League Two	4	0	1	0	1	0	2 (Note: Appearance in the EFL Trophy.)	0	8	0
Woking (loan)	2022–23	National League	17	0	—		—		1 (Note: Appearance in National League play-offs)	0	18	0
Eastleigh	2023–24	National League	36	2	2	0	—		1	0	39	2
Eastleigh	2024–25	National League	4	0	0	0	—		0	0	4	0
Eastleigh	Total		40	2	2	0	0	0	1	0	43	2
Career total			193	29	10	1	1	0	18	2	222	32
