= Tyrell Warren =

English footballer (born 1998)

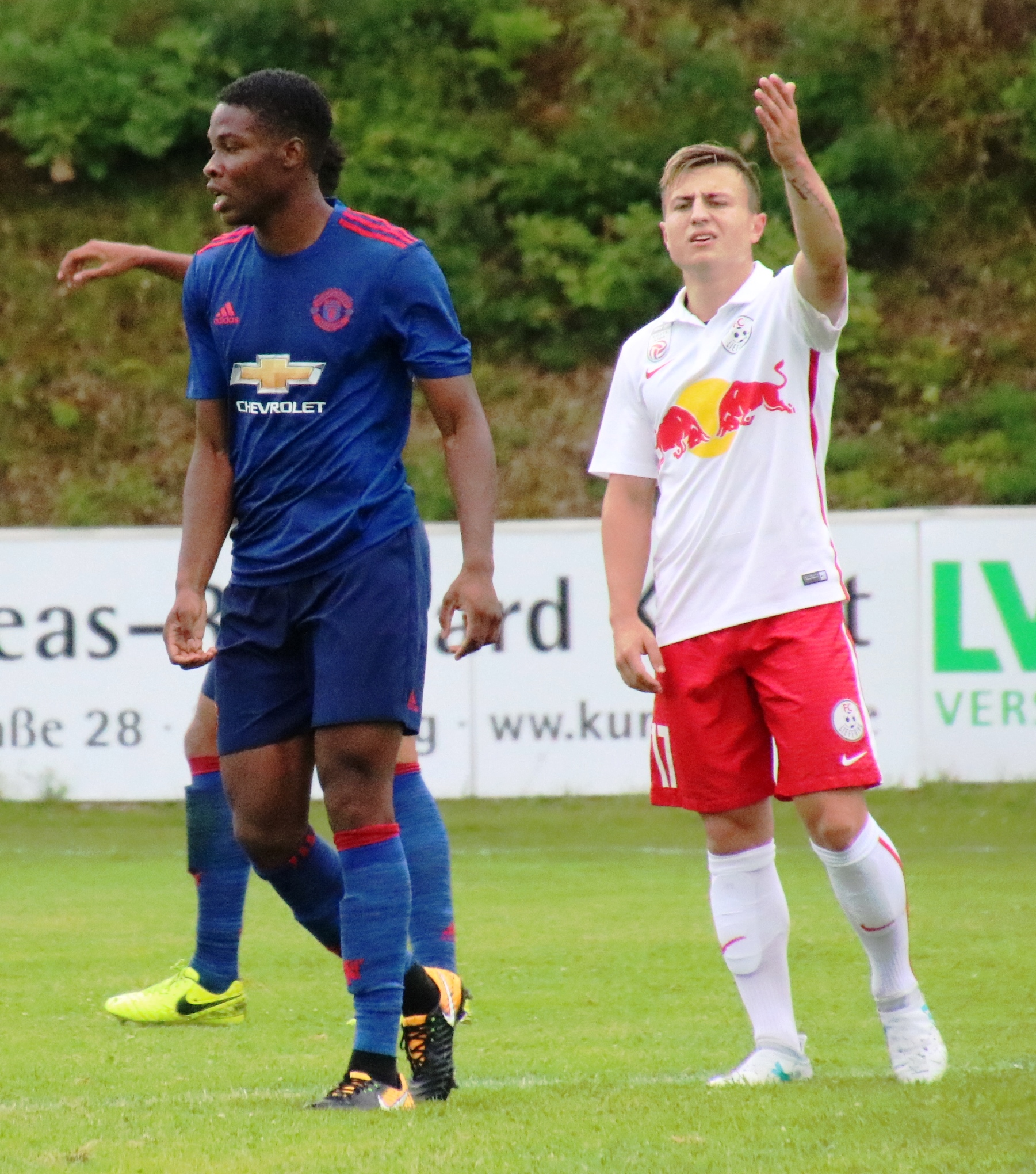
- Warren (left) playing for Manchester United against FC Liefering on 11 July 2017.

Personal information
- Full name: Tyrell Nathaniel Warren
- Date of birth: 5 October 1998 (age 28)
- Place of birth: Manchester, England
- Height: 1.81 m (5 ft 11 in)
- Position: Full back

Team information
- Current team: Solihull Moors

Youth career
- Manchester United

Senior career*
Years	Team	Apps	(Gls)
2019–2020	Salford City	0	(0)
2019–2020	→ Radcliffe (loan)	13	(0)
2020	→ Boston United (loan)	2	(0)
2020–2021	Boston United	3	(0)
2021–2022	FC Halifax Town	41	(0)
2022–2024	Barrow	61	(4)
2024–2026	Grimsby Town	57	(0)
2026–	Solihull Moors	0	(0)
- * Club domestic league appearances and goals as of 20:55, 15 May 2026 (UTC)

Tyrell Nathaniel Warren (born 5 October 1998) is an English professional footballer who last played as a full back for Solihull Moors.

== Career ==
=== Early career ===
Warren played youth football for Manchester United. He moved to Salford City in 2019, spending time on loan at Radcliffe and Boston United. After a permanent spell with Boston he moved to FC Halifax Town in August 2021, before signing for Barrow in June 2022.

He was released by Barrow at the end of the 2023–24 season, and signed for Grimsby Town.

=== Grimsby Town ===
On 28 May 2024, Warren joined Grimsby Town signing a two-year contract as a free agent.

On 13 August 2024, Warren made his debut for Grimsby, as they defeated Bradford City 1–1 (9–8) on penalties in the first round of the 2024–25 Carabao Cup

On 27 August 2025, Warren scored his first goal for Grimsby in a 2–2 home draw against his former club Manchester United in the EFL Cup third round, as well as scoring his penalty as Grimsby won the shootout 12–11.

He was released at the conclusion of the 2025–26 season.

=== Solihull Moors ===
On 24 July 2026, Warren joined Solihull Moors.

== Career statistics ==
As of match played 15 May 2026

Appearances and goals by club, season and competition
Club	Season	League			FA Cup		League Cup		Other		Total	
Club	Season	Division	Apps	Goals	Apps	Goals	Apps	Goals	Apps	Goals	Apps	Goals
Salford City	2019–20	League Two	0	0	0	0	0	0	0	0	0	0
Radcliffe (loan)	2019–20	NPL Premier Division	13	0	0	0	1	0	3 (Note: Two appearances in the FA Trophy, one appearance in Lancashire FA Challenge Trophy.)	0	17	0
Boston United (loan)	2019–20	National League	2	0	0	0	0	0	0	0	2	0
Boston United	2020–21	National League	3	0	0	0	0	0	2 (Note: Appearances in the FA Trophy.)	0	5	0
FC Halifax Town	2021–22	National League	41	0	4	1	0	0	3 (Note: Two appearances in the FA Trophy, one appearance in the Play-Offs.)	0	48	1
Barrow	2022–23	League Two	45	2	1	0	2	0	3 (Note: Appearances in the EFL Trophy.)	0	51	2
Barrow	2023–24	League Two	16	2	0	0	1	0	1	0	18	2
Barrow	Total		61	4	1	0	3	0	4	0	69	4
Grimsby Town	2024–25	League Two	32	0	1	0	2	0	2	0	37	0
Grimsby Town	2025–26	League Two	25	0	4	0	4	1	3 (Note: Two appearances in the EFL Trophy, one appearance in the play-offs)	0	36	1
Grimsby Town	Total		57	0	5	0	6	1	5	0	73	1
Career Total			177	4	10	1	10	1	17	0	213	6

== Personal life ==
Warren is of French descent.
