= Josh Gordon (footballer) =

English footballer (born 1994)

Personal information
- Full name: Joshua Luke Gordon
- Date of birth: 10 October 1994 (age 32)
- Place of birth: Stoke-on-Trent, England
- Height: 5 ft 10 in (1.78 m)
- Position: Striker

Team information
- Current team: Exeter City
- Number: 10

Youth career
- 2002–2011: Stoke City
- 2011–2013: Newcastle Town

Senior career*
Years	Team	Apps	(Gls)
- Newcastle Town
- Nantwich Town
2016	Rhyl	1	(0)
- Nantwich Town
- Stafford Rangers
2017–2018	Leicester City	0	(0)
2018–2021	Walsall	107	(21)
2021–2023	Barrow	73	(21)
2023–2024	Burton Albion	18	(0)
2024	→ Walsall (loan)	21	(1)
2024–2026	Walsall	9	(1)
2025–2026	→ Barrow (loan)	31	(9)
2026–	Exeter City	16	(0)
- * Club domestic league appearances and goals as of 14:25, 22 November 2026 (UTC)

Joshua Luke Gordon (born 10 October 1994) is an English professional footballer who plays as a striker for EFL League Two club Exeter City.

== Career ==
Gordon played youth football for his hometown club Stoke City but was released as a sixteen-year-old. He eventually joined the junior ranks at Newcastle Town before making his way through the age groups to the first team playing in the Evo-Stik Division One South. He combined his early non-league football career with playing basketball, before giving up the latter to focus on football.

A spell at Nantwich Town followed before he moved to Welsh club Rhyl in February 2016. He made just one league appearance for Rhyl before returning to Nantwich.

After a successful spell with Stafford Rangers, where he scored 11 times in the 2016–17 season, he earned a move to reigning Premier League Champions Leicester City in April 2017.

Having failed to break into the first team at Leicester, Gordon signed for Walsall in August 2018. He scored his first professional goal in an EFL Cup tie with Macclesfield Town on 28 August 2018.

Gordon won Walsall's 2019–20 Player of the Season award, after finishing as top scorer with 12 goals for the club. He was offered a new contract by Walsall in November 2020, which he rejected.

On 16 June 2021 it was announced that Gordon would transfer to Barrow at the end of the month, after failing to agree a new contract with Walsall. He was one of three Barrow players to be offered a new contract at the end of the 2022–23 season.

On 19 June 2023, Gordon was announced to be joining League One club Burton Albion on a two-year deal having rejected the offer of a new Barrow contract.

In January 2024, Gordon returned to former club Walsall on loan until the end of the season. He scored his first goal back, and only goal of the season, in a 3–1 win over Doncaster Rovers. On 1 July, Gordon returned to Walsall on a permanent basis, signing a two-year deal. He scored his first goal of the season in a 4–0 win against Swindon Town.

On 1 September 2025 he re-joined Barrow, on loan.

He was released by Walsall at the end of the 2025–26 season. He then signed for Exeter City from 1 July 2026.

== Personal life ==
Gordon studied for a university degree alongside his non-league career, earning a BA (Hons) in Sports Development and Coaching from the University of Staffordshire.

== Career statistics ==
As of match played 21 November 2026

Appearances and goals by club, season and competition
Club	Season	League			National cup		League cup		Other		Total	
Club	Season	Division	Apps	Goals	Apps	Goals	Apps	Goals	Apps	Goals	Apps	Goals
Rhyl	2015–16	Welsh Premier League	1	0	0	0	0	0	0	0	1	0
Leicester City U23	2017–18	—			—		—		4 (Note: Appearance(s) in EFL Trophy)	0	4	0
Walsall	2018–19	League One	37	7	3	0	2	1	3	1	45	9
Walsall	2019–20	League Two	34	9	2	0	1	0	3	3	40	12
Walsall	2020–21	League Two	36	5	0	0	1	0	1	1	38	6
Walsall	Total		107	21	5	0	4	1	7	5	123	27
Barrow	2021–22	League Two	36	6	3	1	2	0	2	0	43	7
Barrow	2022–23	League Two	37	15	1	0	2	0	2	0	42	15
Barrow	Total		73	21	4	1	4	0	4	0	85	22
Burton Albion	2023–24	League One	18	0	1	0	1	0	3	0	23	0
Walsall (loan)	2023–24	League Two	21	1	—		—		—		21	1
Walsall	2024–25	League Two	8	1	0	0	2	0	2 (Note: One appearance in EFL Trophy, one appearance in League Two play-offs)	1	12	2
Walsall	2025–26	League Two	1	0	0	0	1	0	0	0	2	0
Walsall	Total		30	2	0	0	3	0	2	1	14	2
Barrow (loan)	2025–26	League Two	31	9	2	0	0	0	0	0	33	9
Exeter City	2026–27	League One	16	0	1	0	1	0	3	2	21	2
Career total			276	53	13	1	13	1	23	8	325	63

== Honours ==
Individual

- Walsall Player of the Year: 2019–20
