= Ben Whitfield =

English footballer (born 1996)

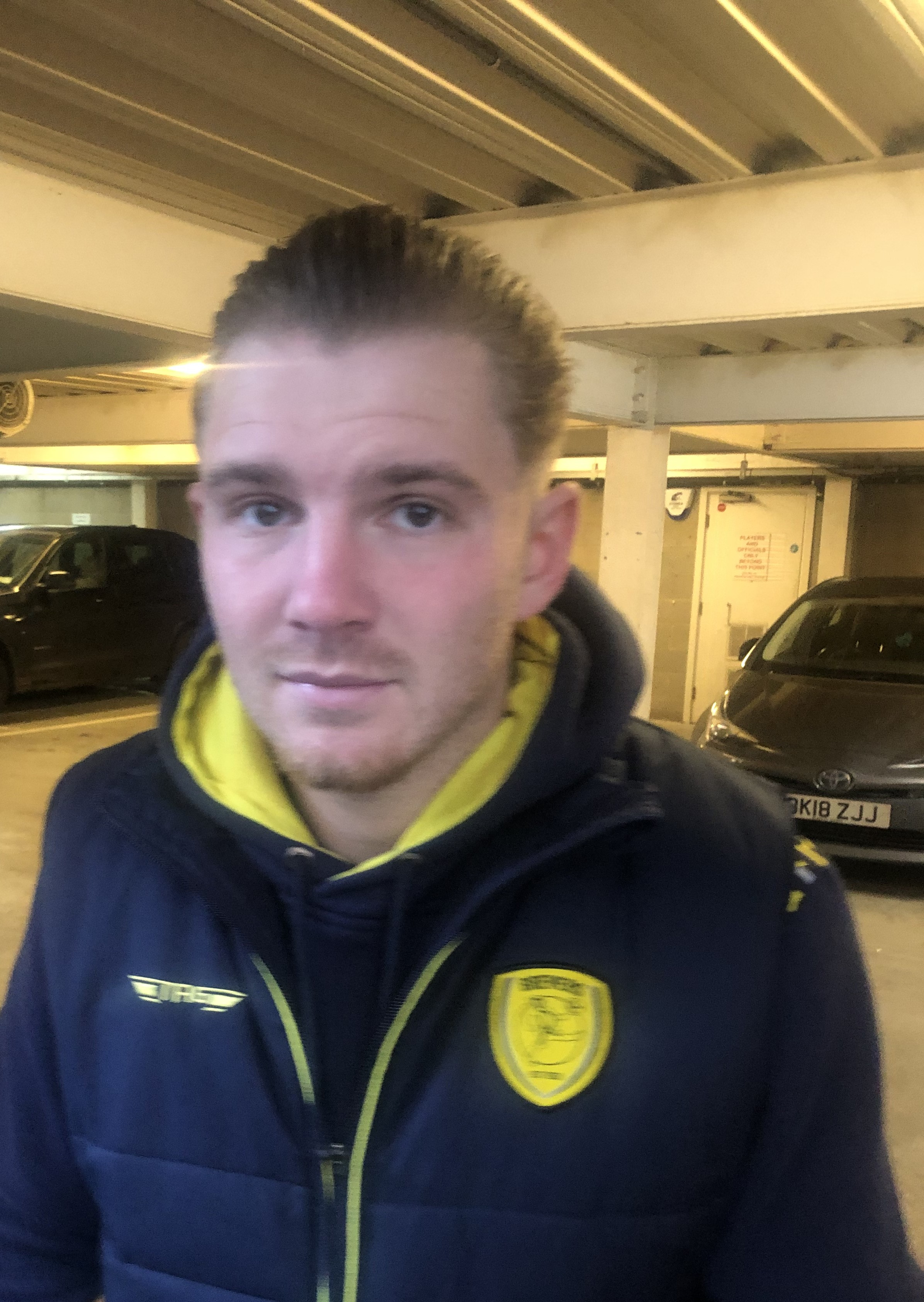
- Ben Whitfield in 2024.

Personal information
- Full name: Benjamin Michael Whitfield
- Date of birth: 28 February 1996 (age 30)
- Place of birth: Bingley, England
- Height: 1.65 m (5 ft 5 in)
- Positions: Attacking midfielder; winger

Team information
- Current team: Boreham Wood (on loan from Barrow)

Youth career
- 2002–2012: Bradford City
- 2012–2013: Silsden
- 2013: Guiseley

Senior career*
Years	Team	Apps	(Gls)
2013–2014	Guiseley	0	(0)
2014–2018	AFC Bournemouth	0	(0)
2015–2016	→ Kidderminster Harriers (loan)	29	(6)
2016–2017	→ Yeovil Town (loan)	34	(2)
2017–2018	→ Port Vale (loan)	37	(4)
2018–2019	Port Vale	30	(4)
2019–2021	Torquay United	55	(11)
2021–2022	Stockport County	15	(2)
2022–2024	Barrow	81	(13)
2024–2025	Burton Albion	23	(1)
2025	→ Barrow (loan)	17	(2)
2025–	Barrow	34	(4)
2026–	→ Boreham Wood (loan)	3	(4)
- * Club domestic league appearances and goals as of 14:32, 27 September 2026 (UTC)

Benjamin Michael Whitfield (born 28 February 1996) is an English professional footballer for National League club Boreham Wood, on loan from National League club Barrow. He can play as an attacking midfielder or as a winger.

Whitfield spent time in the youth teams at Bradford City and Silsden before making his first-team debut for Guiseley in December 2013. He signed with AFC Bournemouth the following month and spent most of the 2015–16 season on loan at Kidderminster Harriers – where he was named as the club's Player of the Year – and the 2016–17 season on loan at Yeovil Town and 2017–18 season on loan at Port Vale. He joined Port Vale permanently in August 2018, though he left the club 13 months later to join non-League Torquay United. He was named Torquay's Player of the Year for the 2019–20 season but left the club shortly after their defeat in the 2021 National League play-off final. He joined Stockport County in July 2021 and helped the club to win promotion into the English Football League as champions of the National League in the 2021–22 season. He signed with Barrow in July 2022. After two seasons with Barrow, he joined Burton Albion, only to return to Barrow on loan in February 2025. The loan was made permanent in August 2025. He was loaned from Barrow to Boreham Wood in September 2026.

== Career ==
=== Guiseley ===
Whitfield was part of the Bradford City academy until the age of 16. Upon his release from Bradford's youth system Whitfield joined the Silsden under-19 side, before signing for the Guiseley academy. On 3 December 2013, Whitfield made his debut for Guiseley in a 2–1 victory over Selby Town in the quarter-finals of the West Riding County Cup. Two weeks later he joined Huddersfield Town on trial.

=== Bournemouth ===
In January 2014, Whitfield signed for Championship side AFC Bournemouth on an 18-month contract. Having been linked to a number of Premier League and English Football League clubs, Whitfield stated that manager Eddie Howe "was a big part of why I decided to come down here because of the way he coaches and his teams play".

==== Kidderminster Harriers loan ====
On 12 October 2015, Whitfield joined National League side Kidderminster Harriers on an initial one-month loan. He was signed by football development director Colin Gordon shortly before the arrival of new manager Dave Hockaday. Whitfield quickly made an impression at Aggborough, and made a goalscoring debut the following day for Kidderminster in a 2–2 draw at Altrincham. The loan deal was extended into the new year, and Whitfield said he appreciated the support shown to him by Harriers fans. On 15 February, his loan deal was extended until the end of the season. He also signed a new one-year contract with Bournemouth. Whitfield scored a total of six goals in 31 appearances whilst on loan for Kidderminster, and although he could not help them avoid relegation at the end of the 2015–16 season, his performances earned him the club's Player of the Year and the Supporters Player of the Year awards.

==== Yeovil Town loan ====
On 25 August 2016, Whitfield joined League Two side Yeovil Town on loan until January 2017. He made his Football League debut two days later as a second-half substitute in a 4–1 defeat at Doncaster Rovers. He scored his first goal for Yeovil at Stevenage on 12 November, when his stoppage-time volley was enough to salvage a point in a 2–2 draw. On 5 January, Whitfield and his fellow Bournemouth loanee Matt Butcher's loans were extended until the end of the 2016–17 season. He received the first booking of his career on 1 April, when he was dismissed for an elbow on Tom Miller in a 2–0 defeat to Carlisle United at Huish Park. Manager Darren Way said that the sending off would prove to be a learning curve for the player. Whitfield scored three goals from 42 appearances across the 2016–17 campaign as the "Glovers" posted a 20th-place finish.

=== Port Vale ===
On 4 August 2017, Whitfield joined League Two side Port Vale on loan until January 2018. He maintained a first-team place under Michael Brown's stewardship, and held on to his place under new manager Neil Aspin, and his well-taken volley secured Aspin his first win as "Valiants" manager in a 3–1 victory over Cheltenham Town at Vale Park on 14 October; the goal was later shortlisted for the League Two goal of the month award. However, he injured his ankle seven days later in a 1–0 win at Exeter City and was ruled out of action for five weeks. Despite interest from other clubs, his loan at Port Vale was extended until the end of the 2017–18 season after the club's initial transfer offer of around £35,000 was not completed. However, by his own admission he was unable to live up to the high standards he set in December, describing his form as "inconsistent" in the second half of the campaign. On 30 March, he scored the winning goal in a crucial 2–1 home victory over Chesterfield. He was offered a new contract by Bournemouth in May 2018.

On 30 August 2018, Whitfield signed a two-year contract with Port Vale. Aspin said that the deal to sign Whitfield in January had fallen through due to the player's agent, adding that: "He's changed his agent now and in football and in life you've got to give people another chance." He was in and out of the first-team as he struggled for consistency under both Aspin and new manager John Askey, and ended the 2018–19 season on the transfer-list after he scored four goals in 33 appearances. In July 2019 he went on trial at Cheltenham Town. His contract with Port Vale was terminated by mutual consent on 3 September. The player's agent, Dan Fletcher, took to Twitter to say that "Sometimes you have to do everything you can to get a player away from a manager, even if that means taking a step back to go several steps forward".

=== Torquay United ===
After leaving Port Vale, Whitfield immediately signed for National League club Torquay United. He scored seven goals in 32 appearances for the "Gulls" in the 2019–20 season, which was permanently suspended on 26 March due to the COVID-19 pandemic in England, with United in 15th-place. He won the club's Player of the Year award and was described as "a great asset to the squad" by manager Gary Johnson. He scored six goals from 33 appearances in the 2020–21 season, but ended the campaign injured and was not in the matchday squad for the play-off final defeat to Hartlepool United. He was linked with a move to Swindon Town, but denied rumours that he had rejected Torquay's offer of a new contract.

=== Stockport County ===
On 7 July 2021, Whitfield signed a two-year deal with National League club Stockport County. Two troublesome injuries meant that he was limited to eight league starts in the 2021–22 campaign, scoring three goals from 19 appearances in all competitions as Dave Challinor's "Hatters" secured promotion into the Football League as champions of the National League.

=== Barrow ===
On 21 July 2022, Whitfield signed for League Two club Barrow on a two-year deal; he joined on a free transfer, with Stockport retaining a sell-on fee. He was nominated for League Two's Player of the Month award for August after starting his time at Holker Street with four assists and one "superb solo" goal against Bradford City. He played 51 of the club's 53 matches throughout the 2022–23 campaign, scoring six goals and providing twelve league assists. He missed August 2023 with an Achilles issue. Manager Pete Wild began to play him as a striker. Whitfield adapted well to the new role, winning a nomination for the EFL League Two Player of the Month Award after he scored four goals in December. He scored 11 goals in 40 games during the 2023–24 season and entered discussions over a new contract. During his time at Holker Street, Whitfield became widely known amongst supporters as 'Tricky Ben', a nickname derived from a chant, reflecting his speed and agility on the field.

=== Burton Albion ===
On 18 June 2024, Whitfield agreed on a two-year deal with League One club Burton Albion. He said he was excited to play at a higher level than he had previously done in his career. On 3 February 2025, he rejoined Barrow on loan until the end of the 2024–25 season having scored three goals in 30 appearances for the "Brewers". He had found playing hard to come by after Gary Bowyer replaced Mark Robinson and Tom Hounsell as head coach. On 8 March, he provided his third assist of the season in a 2–0 home victory over Accrington Stanley, making five assists in the match, he was named on the EFL Team of the Week.

=== Return to Barrow ===
On 3 February 2025, Whitfield returned to Barrow on a short-term loan. He scored two goals in 17 games for Barrow.

On 22 August 2025, Whitfield signed permanently for Barrow, after Burton Albion terminated his contract. Eight days later, an incident occurred at half-time during Barrow's 1–0 at home to Fleetwood Town which resulted in Whitfield receiving a retrospective three match ban for violent conduct. Head coach Andy Whing said this was "very harsh". Whitfield ended the 2025–26 season with two goals in 32 games, as Barrow were relegated from League Two back into non-League.

On 14 September 2026, Whitfield joined National League rivals Boreham Wood on a short-term loan, with manager Luke Garrard noting him as "a constant thorn in our side" as an opposition player. He scored on his debut for the Wood two days later, his winning goal at Scunthorpe United sending Boreham three points clear at the top of the table. He won the National League Player of the Month award after scoring six goals in September.

== Career statistics ==
As of match played 26 September 2026

Appearances and goals by club, season and competition
Club	Season	League			FA Cup		League Cup		Other		Total	
Club	Season	Division	Apps	Goals	Apps	Goals	Apps	Goals	Apps	Goals	Apps	Goals
Guiseley	2013–14	Conference North	0	0	0	0	—		1 (Note: Appearance in West Riding County Cup)	0	1	0
AFC Bournemouth	2013–14	Championship	0	0	0	0	0	0	—		0	0
AFC Bournemouth	2014–15	Championship	0	0	0	0	0	0	—		0	0
AFC Bournemouth	2015–16	Premier League	0	0	0	0	0	0	—		0	0
AFC Bournemouth	2016–17	Premier League	0	0	0	0	0	0	—		0	0
AFC Bournemouth	2017–18	Premier League	0	0	0	0	0	0	—		0	0
AFC Bournemouth	Total		0	0	0	0	0	0	—		0	0
Kidderminster Harriers (loan)	2015–16	National League	29	6	1	0	—		1 (Note: Appearance(s) in FA Trophy)	0	31	6
Yeovil Town (loan)	2016–17	League Two	34	2	2	0	0	0	6 (Note: Appearances in EFL Trophy)	1	42	3
Port Vale (loan)	2017–18	League Two	37	4	0	0	0	0	2	0	39	4
Port Vale	2018–19	League Two	30	4	1	0	0	0	2	0	33	4
Port Vale	2019–20	League Two	0	0	0	0	0	0	0	0	0	0
Port Vale	Total		67	8	1	0	0	0	4	0	72	8
Torquay United	2019–20	National League	28	6	2	1	—		2	0	32	7
Torquay United	2020–21	National League	27	5	2	1	—		4	0	33	6
Torquay United	Total		55	11	4	2	—		6	0	65	13
Stockport County	2021–22	National League	15	2	2	1	—		2	0	19	3
Barrow	2022–23	League Two	45	5	1	0	2	1	3	0	51	6
Barrow	2023–24	League Two	36	8	2	2	0	0	2	1	40	11
Barrow	Total		81	13	3	2	2	1	5	1	91	19
Burton Albion	2024–25	League One	23	1	2	0	1	0	4	2	30	3
Burton Albion	2025–26	League One	0	0	0	0	1	1	0	0	1	1
Burton Albion	Total		23	1	2	0	2	1	4	2	31	4
Barrow (loan)	2024–25	League Two	17	2	—		—		—		17	2
Barrow	2025–26	League Two	27	3	2	0	—		3	0	32	3
Barrow	2026–27	National League	7	1	0	0	—		0	0	7	1
Barrow	Total		34	4	2	0	0	0	3	0	39	4
Boreham Wood	2026–27	National League	3	4	0	0	—		0	0	3	4
Career totals			358	53	17	5	4	2	32	4	411	64

== Honours ==
Stockport County

- National League: 2021–22

Individual

- Kidderminster Harriers Player of the Year: 2015–16
- Torquay United Player of the Year: 2019–20
- National League Player of the Month: September 2026
