= Patrick Brough =

English footballer (born 1996)

Personal information
- Full name: Patrick John Brough
- Date of birth: 20 February 1996 (age 30)
- Place of birth: Carlisle, England
- Height: 6 ft 3 in (1.91 m)
- Position: Left back

Team information
- Current team: Tranmere Rovers
- Number: 23

Youth career
- –2016: Carlisle United

Senior career*
| Years | Team | Apps | (Gls) |
| 2013–2017 | Carlisle United | 40 | (0) |
| 2016 | → Lincoln City (loan) | 4 | (0) |
| 2016–2017 | → Salford City (loan) | 20 | (0) |
| 2017–2018 | Morecambe | 20 | (0) |
| 2018–2019 | Falkirk | 16 | (0) |
| 2019–2023 | Barrow | 156 | (8) |
| 2023–2025 | Northampton Town | 43 | (2) |
| 2025– | Tranmere Rovers | 0 | (0) |
- * Club domestic league appearances and goals as of 1 July 2025 (UTC)

Patrick John Brough (born 20 February 1996) is an English footballer who plays as a defender for EFL League Two side Tranmere Rovers.

== Career ==
=== Carlisle United ===
Brough began his career with Carlisle United and made his professional debut in a 3–3 draw (4-3 win on penalties) against Blackburn Rovers on 7 August 2013 in the Football League Cup.

==== Loans ====
In January 2016 he joined Lincoln City on loan.

In November 2016 he again went out on loan, this time to Salford City.

=== Morecambe ===
On 29 June 2017, Morecambe signed Brough on a free transfer following his release by Carlisle.

He was released by Morecambe at the end of the 2017–18 season.

=== Falkirk ===
Brough signed a one-year contract with Scottish Championship club Falkirk in May 2018, effective from 1 July.

=== Barrow ===
Brough joined Barrow on 17 June 2019. He formed part of the team that won the National League in 2020, gaining promotion to League Two.

He was offered a new contract at the end of the 2022–23 season.

=== Northampton Town ===
In June 2023, he agreed to join newly promoted League One club Northampton Town.

After a good run in the team, Brough suffered a broken leg on 21 September 2024, in a match against Huddersfield Town. He played on for 15 minutes with this broken leg, which ruled him out for the rest of the season. He was invited back for pre-season training following the conclusion of the 2024–25 season.

=== Tranmere Rovers ===
On 6 June 2025, Brough agreed to join League Two side Tranmere Rovers on a two-year deal.

== Career statistics ==
=== Club ===
As of 3 May 2025

Appearances and goals by club, season and competition
| Club | Season | League | | | FA Cup | | League Cup | | Other | | Total | |
| Club | Season | Division | Apps | Goals | Apps | Goals | Apps | Goals | Apps | Goals | Apps | Goals |
|---|---|---|---|---|---|---|---|---|---|---|---|---|
| Carlisle United | 2013–14 | League One | 3 | 0 | 0 | 0 | 1 | 0 | 0 | 0 | 4 | 0 |
| Carlisle United | 2014–15 | League Two | 29 | 0 | 0 | 0 | 1 | 0 | 2 (Note: Appearances in the Football League Trophy) | 0 | 32 | 0 |
| Carlisle United | 2015–16 | League Two | 7 | 0 | 1 | 0 | 2 | 0 | 1 | 0 | 11 | 0 |
| Carlisle United | 2016–17 | League Two | 1 | 0 | 0 | 0 | 0 | 0 | 1 | 0 | 2 | 0 |
| Carlisle United | Total | | 40 | 0 | 1 | 0 | 4 | 0 | 4 | 0 | 49 | 0 |
| Lincoln City (loan) | 2015–16 | National League | 4 | 0 | 0 | 0 | ~ | ~ | 0 | 0 | 4 | 0 |
| Salford City (loan) | 2016–17 | National League North | 20 | 0 | 0 | 0 | ~ | ~ | 0 | 0 | 20 | 0 |
| Morecambe | 2017–18 | League Two | 20 | 0 | 2 | 0 | 1 | 0 | 0 | 0 | 23 | 0 |
| Falkirk | 2018–19 | Scottish Championship | 16 | 0 | 1 | 0 | 3 | 0 | 1 (Note: Appearance(s) in Scottish Challenge Cup) | 0 | 21 | 0 |
| Barrow | 2019–20 | National League | 31 | 2 | 1 | 0 | 0 | 0 | 1 (Note: Appearance(s) in FA Trophy) | 0 | 33 | 2 |
| Barrow | 2020–21 | League Two | 43 | 6 | 1 | 0 | 0 | 0 | 1 | 0 | 45 | 6 |
| Barrow | 2021–22 | League Two | 41 | 0 | 4 | 0 | 2 | 0 | 2 | 0 | 49 | 0 |
| Barrow | 2022–23 | League Two | 41 | 0 | 1 | 0 | 2 | 0 | 2 | 0 | 46 | 0 |
| Barrow | Total | | 156 | 8 | 9 | 0 | 4 | 0 | 6 | 0 | 173 | 8 |
| Northampton Town | 2023–24 | League One | 38 | 2 | 1 | 0 | 1 | 0 | 1 | 0 | 41 | 2 |
| Northampton Town | 2024–25 | League One | 5 | 0 | 0 | 0 | 0 | 0 | 0 | 0 | 5 | 0 |
| Northampton Town | Total | | 43 | 2 | 1 | 0 | 1 | 0 | 1 | 0 | 46 | 2 |
| Career total | | | 299 | 10 | 12 | 0 | 13 | 0 | 12 | 0 | 351 | 10 |
