= Harrison Neal =

English footballer

Personal information
- Full name: Harrison Neal
- Date of birth: 12 May 2001 (age 25)
- Place of birth: Sheffield, England
- Height: 1.80 m (5 ft 11 in)
- Position: Midfielder

Team information
- Current team: Fleetwood Town
- Number: 4

Youth career
- –2021: Sheffield United

Senior career*
| Years | Team | Apps | (Gls) |
| 2021–2024 | Sheffield United | 0 | (0) |
| 2021–2022 | → Kettering Town (loan) | 15 | (1) |
| 2022 | → Southend United (loan) | 22 | (0) |
| 2022–2023 | → Barrow (loan) | 45 | (0) |
| 2023–2024 | → Stevenage (loan) | 5 | (0) |
| 2024–2025 | Carlisle United | 42 | (1) |
| 2025– | Fleetwood Town | 77 | (1) |
- * Club domestic league appearances and goals as of 03:10, 31 October 2026 (UTC)

Harrison Francoiś Neal (born 12 May 2001) is an English footballer who plays as a midfielder for EFL League Two club Fleetwood Town.

== Career ==
=== Sheffield United ===
On 13 August 2021, Neal moved on loan for the first time in his career when he joined National League North club Kettering Town on loan. Neal made his senior debut the following day in a 1–0 victory over Bradford (Park Avenue). On 2 January 2022, in what proved to be his final match for the club, Neal scored his first senior goal with his side's third in a 3–1 victory over league leaders Brackley Town. The following day, Neal joined National League club Southend United on loan for the remainder of the 2021–22 season.

On 12 July 2022, Neal joined EFL League Two club Barrow on loan for the 2022–23 season.

On 14 August 2023, Neal joined newly-promoted EFL League One club Stevenage on a season-long loan. Having struggled for first-team opportunities, he returned to his parent club in January 2024.

=== Carlisle United ===
On 4 January 2024, Neal joined League One club Carlisle United in an undisclosed deal, signing a contract until the end of the 2025–26 season.

=== Fleetwood Town ===
On 16 January 2025, Neal signed for League Two side Fleetwood Town on an eighteen-month contract for an undisclosed fee.

== Career statistics ==
As of 27 October 2026

Appearances and goals by club, season and competition
| Club | Season | League | | | FA Cup | | League Cup | | Other | | Total | |
| Club | Season | Division | Apps | Goals | Apps | Goals | Apps | Goals | Apps | Goals | Apps | Goals |
|---|---|---|---|---|---|---|---|---|---|---|---|---|
| Sheffield United | 2021–22 | Championship | 0 | 0 | 0 | 0 | 0 | 0 | 0 | 0 | 0 | 0 |
| Sheffield United | 2022–23 | Championship | 0 | 0 | 0 | 0 | 0 | 0 | 0 | 0 | 0 | 0 |
| Sheffield United | 2023–24 | Premier League | 0 | 0 | 0 | 0 | 0 | 0 | 0 | 0 | 0 | 0 |
| Sheffield United | Total | | 0 | 0 | 0 | 0 | 0 | 0 | 0 | 0 | 0 | 0 |
| Kettering Town (loan) | 2021–22 | National League North | 15 | 1 | 2 | 0 | 0 | 0 | 1 (Note: Appearance(s) in FA Trophy) | 0 | 18 | 1 |
| Southend United (loan) | 2021–22 | National League | 22 | 0 | 0 | 0 | 0 | 0 | 0 | 0 | 22 | 0 |
| Barrow (loan) | 2022–23 | League Two | 45 | 0 | 1 | 0 | 2 | 0 | 4 (Note: Appearances in the Football League Trophy) | 0 | 52 | 0 |
| Stevenage (loan) | 2023–24 | League One | 5 | 0 | 2 | 0 | 1 | 0 | 3 | 0 | 11 | 0 |
| Carlisle United | 2023–24 | League One | 21 | 0 | 0 | 0 | 0 | 0 | 0 | 0 | 21 | 0 |
| Carlisle United | 2024–25 | League Two | 21 | 1 | 1 | 0 | 1 | 0 | 3 | 0 | 26 | 1 |
| Carlisle United | Total | | 42 | 1 | 1 | 0 | 1 | 0 | 3 | 0 | 47 | 1 |
| Fleetwood Town | 2024–25 | League Two | 21 | 0 | — | | — | | — | | 21 | 0 |
| Fleetwood Town | 2025–26 | League Two | 43 | 1 | 3 | 0 | 1 | 0 | 4 | 0 | 51 | 1 |
| Fleetwood Town | 2026–27 | League Two | 13 | 0 | 0 | 0 | 4 | 0 | 0 | 0 | 17 | 0 |
| Fleetwood Town | Total | | 77 | 1 | 3 | 0 | 5 | 0 | 4 | 0 | 89 | 1 |
| Career total | | | 205 | 3 | 9 | 0 | 9 | 0 | 15 | 0 | 239 | 3 |
