= Josh Kay =

English footballer

Personal information
- Full name: Joshua William Cartmer-Kay
- Date of birth: 30 January 1997 (age 29)
- Place of birth: Blackpool, England
- Height: 5 ft 10 in (1.78 m)
- Position: Midfielder

Team information
- Current team: Macclesfield

Youth career
- 2015–2016: AFC Fylde
- 2016–2018: Barnsley

Senior career*
| Years | Team | Apps | (Gls) |
| 2013–2015 | Squires Gate | | |
| 2015–2016 | AFC Fylde | 0 | (0) |
| 2016–2018 | Barnsley | 1 | (0) |
| 2017 | → AFC Fylde (loan) | 1 | (0) |
| 2017 | → Tranmere Rovers (loan) | 2 | (0) |
| 2018 | Chesterfield | 11 | (0) |
| 2018–2023 | Barrow | 172 | (23) |
| 2023–2024 | AFC Fylde | 33 | (4) |
| 2024–2026 | Oldham Athletic | 21 | (1) |
| 2025–2026 | → Macclesfield (loan) | 26 | (3) |
| 2026– | Macclesfield | 0 | (0) |
- * Club domestic league appearances and goals as of 17:37, 4 May 2026 (UTC)

Joshua William Cartmer-Kay (born 30 January 1997) is an English professional footballer who plays as a midfielder for National League North club Macclesfield.

== Career ==
=== AFC Fylde ===
Kay joined AFC Fylde's academy programme from Squires Gate in the summer of 2015 and made his senior debut in a 2–0 FA Trophy victory over Warrington Town on 28 November 2015. He subsequently earned himself places on the bench for several National League North games, as well as the next round of the FA Trophy against Skelmersdale United.

=== Barnsley ===
Kay joined EFL Championship team Barnsley's youth team from Fylde in February 2016 and made his debut in a Championship match against Bristol City on 29 October 2016. He also spent time on loan at former club Fylde in March 2017, playing one game, and at Tranmere Rovers in November 2017, where he played two games, in addition to a trial game with Blackburn Rovers Under-23s in October 2017.

=== Chesterfield ===
Kay joined EFL League Two side Chesterfield on 4 January 2018. He made his debut in a 4–0 defeat against Accrington Stanley on 6 January 2018. His contract was not renewed by Chesterfield at the end of the 2017–18 season.

=== Barrow ===
Following his release, Kay signed a two-year contract for National League side Barrow on 26 June 2018, joining former Chesterfield caretaker-manager Ian Evatt at the Cumbria club. Kay formed part of the National League title winning side of 2020.

He was one of three Barrow players to be offered a new contract at the end of the 2022–23 season.

=== AFC Fylde ===
On 9 August 2023, Kay returned to AFC Fylde following their promotion back to the National League.

=== Oldham Athletic ===
On 1 July 2024, Kay joined National League side Oldham Athletic on a two-year contract.

On 4 September 2025, Kay joined National League North side Macclesfield FC on loan for the remainder of the 2025–26 season.

On 4 May 2026, Oldham Athletic announced that Kay would depart the club upon the expiry of his contract.

=== Macclesfield ===
On 1 August 2026, Kay returned to Macclesfield on a permanent deal.

== Career statistics ==
As of end of 2025–26 season

Appearances and goals by club, season and competition
| Club | Season | League | | | FA Cup | | League Cup | | Other | | Total | |
| Club | Season | Division | Apps | Goals | Apps | Goals | Apps | Goals | Apps | Goals | Apps | Goals |
|---|---|---|---|---|---|---|---|---|---|---|---|---|
| AFC Fylde | 2015–16 | National League North | 0 | 0 | 0 | 0 | 0 | 0 | 1 (Note: Appearance(s) in FA Trophy) | 0 | 1 | 0 |
| Barnsley | 2015–16 | League One | 0 | 0 | 0 | 0 | 0 | 0 | 0 | 0 | 0 | 0 |
| Barnsley | 2016–17 | Championship | 1 | 0 | 0 | 0 | 0 | 0 | 0 | 0 | 1 | 0 |
| Barnsley | 2017–18 | Championship | 0 | 0 | 0 | 0 | 0 | 0 | 0 | 0 | 0 | 0 |
| Barnsley | Total | | 1 | 0 | 0 | 0 | 0 | 0 | 0 | 0 | 1 | 0 |
| AFC Fylde (loan) | 2016–17 | National League North | 1 | 0 | 0 | 0 | — | | 0 | 0 | 1 | 0 |
| Tranmere Rovers (loan) | 2017–18 | National League | 2 | 0 | 0 | 0 | — | | 0 | 0 | 2 | 0 |
| Chesterfield | 2017–18 | League Two | 11 | 0 | 0 | 0 | 0 | 0 | 0 | 0 | 11 | 0 |
| Barrow | 2018–19 | National League | 40 | 3 | 0 | 0 | — | | 0 | 0 | 40 | 3 |
| Barrow | 2019–20 | National League | 35 | 6 | 1 | 0 | — | | 1 | 1 | 37 | 7 |
| Barrow | 2020–21 | League Two | 29 | 5 | 1 | 0 | 1 | 0 | 2 (Note: Appearance(s) in EFL Trophy) | 0 | 33 | 5 |
| Barrow | 2021–22 | League Two | 34 | 5 | 4 | 1 | 1 | 0 | 2 | 0 | 41 | 6 |
| Barrow | 2022–23 | League Two | 34 | 4 | 1 | 0 | 1 | 0 | 2 | 2 | 38 | 6 |
| Barrow | Total | | 172 | 23 | 7 | 1 | 3 | 0 | 71 | 3 | 189 | 27 |
| AFC Fylde | 2023–24 | National League | 33 | 4 | 1 | 0 | — | | 1 | 0 | 35 | 4 |
| Oldham Athletic | 2024–25 | National League | 21 | 1 | 1 | 0 | — | | — | | 22 | 1 |
| Oldham Athletic | 2025–26 | League Two | 0 | 0 | 0 | 0 | 0 | 0 | 1 | 0 | 1 | 0 |
| Oldham Athletic | Total | | 21 | 1 | 1 | 0 | 0 | 0 | 1 | 0 | 23 | 1 |
| Macclesfield (loan) | 2025–26 | National League North | 26 | 3 | 4 | 1 | — | | 3 (Note: One appearance in FA Trophy, two appearances and one goal in National League North play-offs) | 1 | 33 | 5 |
| Career total | | | 267 | 31 | 13 | 2 | 3 | 0 | 13 | 4 | 296 | 37 |
