= List of English football transfers summer 2021 =

The 2021 English football summer transfer window ran from 24 May to 31 August 2021. Players without a club could be signed at any time, clubs could sign players on loan dependent on their league's regulations, and clubs could sign a goalkeeper on an emergency loan if they had no registered senior goalkeeper available. This list includes transfers featuring at least one club from either the Premier League or the EFL Championship that were completed after the end of the winter 2020–21 transfer window on 2 February and before the end of the 2021 summer window.

== Transfers ==
All players and clubs without a flag are English. Note that while Cardiff City, Swansea City and Newport County are affiliated with the Football Association of Wales and thus take the Welsh flag, they play in the Championship and League Two respectively, and so their transfers are included here.

Date	Name	Moving from	Moving to	Fee
1 March 2021	Josh McEachran	Unattached	MK Dons	Free
4 March 2021	(Colombia) Carlos Sánchez	Unattached	Watford	Free
4 March 2021	(Republic of Ireland) Derrick Williams	Blackburn Rovers	(United States) LA Galaxy	Free
12 March 2021	(Northern Ireland) Lee Camp	Unattached	Swindon Town	Free
18 March 2021	(Wales) Joe Ledley	Unattached	(Wales) Newport County	Free
23 March 2021	Calvin Andrew	Unattached	Barrow	Free
30 March 2021	(Senegal) Oumar Niasse	Unattached	Huddersfield Town	Free
30 March 2021	Danny Simpson	Unattached	Bristol City	Free
6 May 2021	Marcus McGuane	Nottingham Forest	Oxford United	Undisclosed
13 May 2021	(Netherlands) Jordy de Wijs	Hull City	Queens Park Rangers	Undisclosed
14 May 2021	Harry Pell	Colchester United	Accrington Stanley	Free
14 May 2021	Matthew Sorinola	MK Dons	(Belgium) Union SG	Compensation
17 May 2021	Kwadwo Baah	Rochdale	Watford	Undisclosed
17 May 2021	Luke Leahy	Bristol Rovers	Shrewsbury Town	Free
19 May 2021	(Wales) Elliott Hewitt	Grimsby Town	Mansfield Town	Free
19 May 2021	Joe Lumley	Queens Park Rangers	Middlesbrough	Free
20 May 2021	Sam Field	West Bromwich Albion	Queens Park Rangers	Undisclosed
20 May 2021	(Wales) James Wilson	Ipswich Town	Plymouth Argyle	Free
25 May 2021	George Long	Hull City	Millwall	Free
25 May 2021	Scott Malone	Derby County	Millwall	Free
25 May 2021	(Nigeria) Fred Onyedinma	Wycombe Wanderers	Luton Town	Undisclosed
25 May 2021	Cole Skuse	Ipswich Town	Colchester United	Free
26 May 2021	Nick Anderton	Carlisle United	Bristol Rovers	Free
26 May 2021	Paul Coutts	Fleetwood Town	Bristol Rovers	Free
26 May 2021	Sam Finley	Fleetwood Town	Bristol Rovers	Free
26 May 2021	Mark Hughes	Accrington Stanley	Bristol Rovers	Free
26 May 2021	Lee Nicholls	MK Dons	Huddersfield Town	Free
26 May 2021	Alex Pattison	Wycombe Wanderers	Harrogate Town	Free
27 May 2021	Dapo Afolayan	West Ham United	Bolton Wanderers	Free
27 May 2021	Matthew Pennington	Everton	Shrewsbury Town	Free
27 May 2021	Mattie Pollock	Grimsby Town	Watford	£250,000
28 May 2021	(Austria) Kevin Wimmer	Stoke City	(Austria) Rapid Wien	Free
1 June 2021	(France) Imran Louza	(France) Nantes	Watford	Undisclosed
2 June 2021	Charlie Austin	West Bromwich Albion	Queens Park Rangers	Free
2 June 2021	Reece Burke	Hull City	Luton Town	Free
2 June 2021	Nicke Kabamba	(Scotland) Kilmarnock	Northampton Town	Free
2 June 2021	Olly Lee	(Scotland) Heart of Midlothian	Gillingham	Free
2 June 2021	Liam Vincent	Bromley	Portsmouth	Undisclosed
3 June 2021	(Wales) Wes Burns	Fleetwood Town	Ipswich Town	Undisclosed
3 June 2021	James Daly	Bristol Rovers	Stevenage	Free
3 June 2021	Tom Parkes	Exeter City	(Scotland) Livingston	Free
3 June 2021	Ollie Turton	Blackpool	Huddersfield Town	Free
4 June 2021	(Wales) Lee Evans	Wigan Athletic	Ipswich Town	Free
4 June 2021	Ben Garrity	Blackpool	Port Vale	Undisclosed
4 June 2021	Brad Halliday	Doncaster Rovers	Fleetwood Town	Free
4 June 2021	(Scotland) George Johnston	(Netherlands) Feyenoord	Bolton Wanderers	Free
4 June 2021	Cameron Norman	Walsall	(Wales) Newport County	Free
4 June 2021	Jack Whatmough	Portsmouth	Wigan Athletic	Free
7 June 2021	Cameron Borthwick-Jackson	Oldham Athletic	Burton Albion	Free
7 June 2021	Ben Close	Portsmouth	Doncaster Rovers	Free
7 June 2021	Chris Long	(Scotland) Motherwell	Crewe Alexandra	Free
7 June 2021	Curtis Main	Shrewsbury Town	(Scotland) St Mirren	Free
7 June 2021	George Moncur	Luton Town	Hull City	Free
7 June 2021	James Wilson	Salford City	Port Vale	Free
7 June 2021	(Wales) Josh Sheehan	(Wales) Newport County	Bolton Wanderers	Free
7 June 2021	(Republic of the Congo) Offrande Zanzala	Carlisle United	Barrow	Undisclosed
8 June 2021	Devante Cole	(Scotland) Motherwell	Barnsley	Free
8 June 2021	Josh Coley	Maidenhead United	Exeter City	Undisclosed
8 June 2021	Paul Farman	Carlisle United	Barrow	Free
8 June 2021	Lloyd Jones	Northampton Town	Cambridge United	Free
8 June 2021	(Northern Ireland) Shayne Lavery	(Northern Ireland) Linfield	Blackpool	Free
8 June 2021	Omari Patrick	Carlisle United	Burton Albion	Free
8 June 2021	Mitchell Pinnock	(Scotland) Kilmarnock	Northampton Town	Free
8 June 2021	Scott Twine	Swindon Town	MK Dons	Undisclosed
8 June 2021	Tom White	Blackburn Rovers	Barrow	Free
8 June 2021	Harry Wright	Ipswich Town	Fleetwood Town	Free
9 June 2021	Scott Brown	Port Vale	Exeter City	Free
9 June 2021	Tom Davies	Bristol Rovers	Tranmere Rovers	Free
9 June 2021	(Scotland) Liam Lindsay	Stoke City	Preston North End	Undisclosed
9 June 2021	Aaron Martin	(Scotland) Hamilton Academical	Port Vale	Free
9 June 2021	Jack Payne	Eastleigh	Crawley Town	Undisclosed
9 June 2021	Darren Pratley	Charlton Athletic	Leyton Orient	Free
9 June 2021	(Australia) Ryan Williams	Portsmouth	Oxford United	Free
10 June 2021	(Argentina) Emiliano Buendía	Norwich City	Aston Villa	£33m
10 June 2021	Luke Chambers	Ipswich Town	Colchester United	Free
10 June 2021	(Wales) Gwion Edwards	Ipswich Town	Wigan Athletic	Free
10 June 2021	Luke Hannant	Cambridge United	Colchester United	Free
10 June 2021	Danny Johnson	Leyton Orient	Mansfield Town	Free
10 June 2021	Nathaniel Knight-Percival	Morecambe	Tranmere Rovers	Free
10 June 2021	Paul Lewis	Tranmere Rovers	Northampton Town	Free
10 June 2021	Chris Merrie	Wigan Athletic	Tranmere Rovers	Undisclosed
10 June 2021	Deji Oshilaja	Charlton Athletic	Burton Albion	Free
10 June 2021	Dan Scarr	Walsall	Plymouth Argyle	Undisclosed
10 June 2021	Chris Stokes	Forest Green Rovers	(Scotland) Kilmarnock	Free
11 June 2021	James Brophy	Leyton Orient	Cambridge United	Free
11 June 2021	Joe Day	(Wales) Cardiff City	(Wales) Newport County	Free
11 June 2021	Ashley Fletcher	Middlesbrough	Watford	Free
11 June 2021	(Argentina) Juan Foyth	Tottenham Hotspur	(Spain) Villarreal	Undisclosed
11 June 2021	(Wales) Declan John	(Wales) Swansea City	Bolton Wanderers	Free
11 June 2021	Tom Naylor	Portsmouth	Wigan Athletic	Free
11 June 2021	Harry Ransom	Millwall	Crawley Town	Free
11 June 2021	(Republic of Ireland) Pierce Sweeney	Exeter City	Swindon Town	Free
11 June 2021	Donovan Wilson	Bath City	Sutton United	Undisclosed
11 June 2021	Joe Wollacott	Bristol City	Swindon Town	Free
12 June 2021	Andy Cook	Mansfield Town	Bradford City	Free
12 June 2021	Joss Labadie	(Wales) Newport County	Walsall	Free
14 June 2021	Tristan Abrahams	(Wales) Newport County	Carlisle United	Free
14 June 2021	Tom Clarke	Salford City	Fleetwood Town	Free
14 June 2021	(Republic of Ireland) Stephen Quinn	Burton Albion	Mansfield Town	Free
14 June 2021	(Cameroon) Manny Monthe	Tranmere Rovers	Walsall	Free
15 June 2021	Omar Beckles	Crewe Alexandra	Leyton Orient	Free
15 June 2021	(Scotland) Allan Campbell	(Scotland) Motherwell	Luton Town	Undisclosed
15 June 2021	(Republic of Ireland) Dylan Connolly	(Scotland) St Mirren	Northampton Town	Free
15 June 2021	Andre Dozzell	Ipswich Town	Queens Park Rangers	Free
15 June 2021	(Germany) Max Ehmer	Bristol Rovers	Gillingham	Free
15 June 2021	Macaulay Gillesphey	(Australia) Brisbane Roar	Plymouth Argyle	Free
15 June 2021	Bryn Morris	Portsmouth	Burton Albion	Free
15 June 2021	(Scotland) Charlie Mulgrew	Blackburn Rovers	(Scotland) Dundee United	Free
15 June 2021	(Northern Ireland) Ben Reeves	Plymouth Argyle	Gillingham	Free
15 June 2021	Freddie Sears	Ipswich Town	Colchester United	Free
15 June 2021	Jayden Stockley	Preston North End	Charlton Athletic	Undisclosed
16 June 2021	Andy Cannon	Portsmouth	Hull City	Free
16 June 2021	(Wales) Owen Evans	Wigan Athletic	Cheltenham Town	Free
16 June 2021	Josh Gordon	Walsall	Barrow	Free
16 June 2021	Remeao Hutton	Birmingham City	Barrow	Free
16 June 2021	(Serbia) Danilo Pantić	Chelsea	(Serbia) Partizan	Undisclosed
16 June 2021	Max Power	Sunderland	Wigan Athletic	Free
16 June 2021	(Argentina) Franco Ravizzoli	Eastbourne Borough	MK Dons	Free
16 June 2021	Danny Rose	Tottenham Hotspur	Watford	Free
16 June 2021	Connor Wood	Bradford City	Leyton Orient	Free
17 June 2021	Will Aimson	Plymouth Argyle	Bolton Wanderers	Free
17 June 2021	Elliott Bennett	Blackburn Rovers	Shrewsbury Town	Free
17 June 2021	Ryan Bowman	Exeter City	Shrewsbury Town	Undisclosed
17 June 2021	Max Clark	Hull City	Fleetwood Town	Free
17 June 2021	Liam Feeney	Blackpool	Tranmere Rovers	Free
17 June 2021	Josh Ginnelly	Preston North End	(Scotland) Heart of Midlothian	Free
17 June 2021	(France) Arthur Gnahoua	Bolton Wanderers	Morecambe	Free
17 June 2021	Kyle Knoyle	Cambridge United	Doncaster Rovers	Free
17 June 2021	(Colombia) Yerson Mosquera	(Colombia) Atlético Nacional	Wolverhampton Wanderers	£4.5m
17 June 2021	Louis Moult	Preston North End	Burton Albion	Free
17 June 2021	(Republic of Ireland) John O'Sullivan	Morecambe	Accrington Stanley	Free
17 June 2021	Fikayo Tomori	Chelsea	(Italy) Milan	£24m
17 June 2021	Shilow Tracey	Tottenham Hotspur	Cambridge United	Free
17 June 2021	Ashley Young	(Italy) Inter Milan	Aston Villa	Free
17 June 2021	Randell Williams	Exeter City	Hull City	Free
18 June 2021	Frazer Blake-Tracy	Peterborough United	Burton Albion	Free
18 June 2021	Jack Earing	Halifax Town	Walsall	Undisclosed
18 June 2021	(Sudan) Abo Eisa	Scunthorpe United	Bradford City	Free
18 June 2021	Mark Ellis	Tranmere Rovers	Barrow	Free
18 June 2021	(Belgium) Björn Engels	Aston Villa	(Belgium) Royal Antwerp	Undisclosed
18 June 2021	Cameron Jerome	MK Dons	Luton Town	Free
18 June 2021	(Republic of Ireland) Alan Judge	Ipswich Town	Colchester United	Free
18 June 2021	Henri Lansbury	Bristol City	Luton Town	Free
18 June 2021	Frank Nouble	Plymouth Argyle	Colchester United	Free
18 June 2021	(Democratic Republic of the Congo) David Tutonda	Bristol Rovers	Gillingham	Free
18 June 2021	Ro-Shaun Williams	Shrewsbury Town	Doncaster Rovers	Free
19 June 2021	Josh Bowler	Everton	Blackpool	Free
19 June 2021	Ryan Watson	Northampton Town	Tranmere Rovers	Free
20 June 2021	Oscar Threlkeld	Salford City	Bradford City	Free
20 June 2021	Ed Upson	Bristol Rovers	(Wales) Newport County	Free
21 June 2021	Trae Coyle	Arsenal	(Switzerland) Lausanne-Sport	Undisclosed
21 June 2021	(Nigeria) Emmanuel Dennis	(Belgium) Club Brugge	Watford	Undisclosed
21 June 2021	(Ghana) Opi Edwards	Bristol City	Forest Green Rovers	Free
21 June 2021	Oliver Hawkins	Ipswich Town	Mansfield Town	Undisclosed
21 June 2021	(Republic of Ireland) Mark McGuinness	Arsenal	(Wales) Cardiff City	Undisclosed
21 June 2021	Zech Medley	Arsenal	(Belgium) KV Oostende	Undisclosed
21 June 2021	Jake Reeves	Notts County	Stevenage	Free
21 June 2021	Ben Stevenson	Colchester United	Forest Green Rovers	Free
22 June 2021	Lee Angol	Leyton Orient	Bradford City	Free
22 June 2021	Oliver Casey	Leeds United	Blackpool	Undisclosed
22 June 2021	Jordan Clarke	Scunthorpe United	Oldham Athletic	Free
22 June 2021	Zach Clough	Wigan Athletic	Carlisle United	Free
22 June 2021	(Republic of Ireland) Ryan Delaney	Bolton Wanderers	Morecambe	Free
22 June 2021	Sam Hart	Southend United	Oldham Athletic	Free
22 June 2021	(Barbados) Hallam Hope	Swindon Town	Oldham Athletic	Free
22 June 2021	(Canada) Jayson Leutwiler	Huddersfield Town	Oldham Athletic	Free
22 June 2021	Wes McDonald	Walsall	Morecambe	Free
22 June 2021	Harrison McGahey	Scunthorpe United	Oldham Athletic	Free
22 June 2021	Josh Morris	Fleetwood Town	Salford City	Free
22 June 2021	(Kosovo) Milot Rashica	(Germany) Werder Bremen	Norwich City	£9m
22 June 2021	Liam Roberts	Walsall	Northampton Town	Undisclosed
22 June 2021	(Scotland) Clark Robertson	Rotherham United	Portsmouth	Free
23 June 2021	Josh Cogley	Birmingham City	Tranmere Rovers	Free
23 June 2021	(Brazil) Lucas Covolan	Torquay United	Port Vale	Free
23 June 2021	(Germany) Robert Glatzel	(Wales) Cardiff City	(Germany) Hamburger SV	Undisclosed
23 June 2021	Joe Grayson	Blackburn Rovers	Barrow	Free
23 June 2021	Angus Gunn	Southampton	Norwich City	Undisclosed
23 June 2021	(Scotland) Regan Hendry	(Scotland) Raith Rovers	Forest Green Rovers	Free
23 June 2021	(Republic of Ireland) Thomas O'Connor	Southampton	Burton Albion	Free
23 June 2021	Liam Ridehalgh	Tranmere Rovers	Bradford City	Free
23 June 2021	(Netherlands) Davy Pröpper	Brighton & Hove Albion	(Netherlands) PSV	Undisclosed
23 June 2021	Tommy Rowe	Bristol City	Doncaster Rovers	Free
23 June 2021	(Wales) Liam Shephard	(Wales) Newport County	Salford City	Free
23 June 2021	(Republic of Ireland) Corey Whelan	Wigan Athletic	Carlisle United	Free
23 June 2021	Ryan Wintle	Crewe Alexandra	Cardiff City	Free
24 June 2021	James Bolton	Portsmouth	Plymouth Argyle	Undisclosed
24 June 2021	Callum Burton	Cambridge United	Plymouth Argyle	Free
24 June 2021	Callum Connolly	Everton	Blackpool	Free
24 June 2021	Ryan Cooney	Burnley	Morecambe	Free
24 June 2021	Jordan Graham	Gillingham	Birmingham City	Free
24 June 2021	Jon Guthrie	(Scotland) Livingston	Northampton Town	Free
24 June 2021	(Wales) Shaun MacDonald	Rotherham United	Crewe Alexandra	Free
24 June 2021	(Slovakia) Marko Marosi	Coventry City	Shrewsbury Town	Undisclosed
24 June 2021	Jonny Maxted	Exeter City	Northampton Town	Free
24 June 2021	Danilo Orsi	Maidenhead United	Harrogate Town	Free
24 June 2021	(Republic of Ireland) Conor Shaughnessy	Rochdale	Burton Albion	Free
24 June 2021	Ben Wilmot	Watford	Stoke City	Undisclosed
25 June 2021	(Sierra Leone) Amadou Bakayoko	Coventry City	Bolton Wanderers	Free
25 June 2021	Courtney Baker-Richardson	Barrow	(Wales) Newport County	Free
25 June 2021	(Jamaica) Amari'i Bell	Blackburn Rovers	Luton Town	Free
25 June 2021	Sonny Carey	King's Lynn Town	Blackpool	Undisclosed
25 June 2021	(Wales) Aaron Collins	Forest Green Rovers	Bristol Rovers	Free
25 June 2021	Joel Dixon	Barrow	Bolton Wanderers	Free
25 June 2021	Rekeem Harper	West Bromwich Albion	Ipswich Town	Undisclosed
25 June 2021	Jordan Houghton	MK Dons	Plymouth Argyle	Free
25 June 2021	Jermaine Hylton	(Scotland) Ross County	(Wales) Newport County	Free
25 June 2021	Jack Lankester	Ipswich Town	Cambridge United	Undisclosed
25 June 2021	Harvey Saunders	Fleetwood Town	Bristol Rovers	Free
25 June 2021	(Northern Ireland) Paul Smyth	Queens Park Rangers	Leyton Orient	Free
25 June 2021	Aidan Stone	Mansfield Town	Port Vale	Free
25 June 2021	George Williams	Bristol Rovers	Cambridge United	Free
25 June 2021	(Republic of Ireland) Shaun Williams	Millwall	Portsmouth	Free
26 June 2021	Luke Armstrong	Salford City	Harrogate Town	Undisclosed
26 June 2021	(Spain) Carlos Mendes Gomes	Morecambe	Luton Town	Undisclosed
26 June 2021	Ryan Tunnicliffe	Luton Town	Portsmouth	Free
27 June 2021	Ryan Johnson	Hartlepool United	Port Vale	Free
28 June 2021	Ben Amos	Charlton Athletic	Wigan Athletic	Free
28 June 2021	Mal Benning	Mansfield Town	Port Vale	Free
28 June 2021	Jack Bonham	Gillingham	Stoke City	Free
28 June 2021	(Wales) David Cornell	Ipswich Town	Peterborough United	Free
28 June 2021	Emmanuel Dieseruvwe	Salford City	Tranmere Rovers	Free
28 June 2021	(Republic of Ireland) Aaron Drinan	Ipswich Town	Leyton Orient	Undisclosed
28 June 2021	Alex Gilliead	Scunthorpe United	Bradford City	Free
28 June 2021	(Czech Republic) Václav Hladký	Salford City	Ipswich Town	Free
28 June 2021	(Scotland) Craig MacGillivray	Portsmouth	Charlton Athletic	Free
28 June 2021	Tom Pett	Stevenage	Port Vale	Free
28 June 2021	George Ray	Tranmere Rovers	Exeter City	Free
28 June 2021	Callum Rowe	Aston Villa	Exeter City	Free
29 June 2021	(Nigeria) Sammy Ameobi	Nottingham Forest	Middlesbrough	Free
29 June 2021	(Guyana) Elliot Bonds	Hull City	Cheltenham Town	Free
29 June 2021	(Jamaica) Jevani Brown	Colchester United	Exeter City	Free
29 June 2021	Jorge Grant	Lincoln City	Peterborough United	Undisclosed
29 June 2021	(Republic of Ireland) Fiacre Kelleher	(Wales) Wrexham	Bradford City	Free
29 June 2021	Brendan Kiernan	Harrogate Town	Walsall	Free
29 June 2021	Jonathan Obika	(Scotland) St Mirren	Morecambe	Free
29 June 2021	Matt Penney	Sheffield Wednesday	Ipswich Town	Free
29 June 2021	Dominic Samuel	Blackburn Rovers	(Scotland) Ross County	Free
29 June 2021	Josh Scowen	Sunderland	Wycombe Wanderers	Free
30 June 2021	(Wales) Billy Bodin	Preston North End	Oxford United	Free
30 June 2021	Harry Davis	Morecambe	Scunthorpe United	Free
30 June 2021	(Northern Ireland) Rory McArdle	Exeter City	Harrogate Town	Undisclosed
30 June 2021	Harry Davis	Rotherham United	Preston North End	Free
30 June 2021	(Cameroon) Yann Songo'o	Morecambe	Bradford City	Free
1 July 2021	(Argentina) Sergio Agüero	Manchester City	(Spain) Barcelona	Free
1 July 2021	Izzy Brown	Chelsea	Preston North End	Free
1 July 2021	James Brown	Millwall	(Scotland) St Johnstone	Free
1 July 2021	(United States) Geoff Cameron	Queens Park Rangers	(United States) FC Cincinnati	Free
1 July 2021	(Zambia) Patson Daka	(Austria) Red Bull Salzburg	Leicester City	£22m
1 July 2021	Craig Dawson	Watford	West Ham United	£2m
1 July 2021	George Dobson	Sunderland	Charlton Athletic	Free
1 July 2021	Owen Gallacher	Burton Albion	Crawley Town	Free
1 July 2021	(Spain) Eric García	Manchester City	(Spain) Barcelona	Free
1 July 2021	Kieran Gibbs	West Bromwich Albion	(United States) Inter Miami	Free
1 July 2021	Daniel Grimshaw	Manchester City	Blackpool	Free
1 July 2021	(Republic of Ireland) Tommie Hoban	(Scotland) Aberdeen	Crewe Alexandra	Free
1 July 2021	Reece James	Doncaster Rovers	Blackpool	Free
1 July 2021	Dan Jones	Salford City	Port Vale	Free
1 July 2021	Joe Kizzi	Bromley	Sutton United	Free
1 July 2021	(France) Ibrahima Konaté	(Germany) RB Leipzig	Liverpool	£35m
1 July 2021	Ricky Korboa	Northampton Town	Sutton United	Free
1 July 2021	(Northern Ireland) Matty Lund	Rochdale	Salford City	Undisclosed
1 July 2021	Jack Marriott	Derby County	Peterborough United	Free
1 July 2021	Conor McAleny	Oldham Athletic	Salford City	Free
1 July 2021	(Slovenia) Jan Mlakar	Brighton & Hove Albion	(Croatia) Hajduk Split	Undisclosed
1 July 2021	(Colombia) Cristian Montaño	Port Vale	(Scotland) Livingston	Free
1 July 2021	Thierry Nevers	Reading	West Ham United	Undisclosed
1 July 2021	Mark Oxley	Southend United	Harrogate Town	Free
1 July 2021	Matty Pearson	Luton Town	Huddersfield Town	Free
1 July 2021	Archie Procter	AFC Wimbledon	Accrington Stanley	Undisclosed
1 July 2021	(Scotland) Jordan Rhodes	Sheffield Wednesday	Huddersfield Town	Free
1 July 2021	Omar Richards	Reading	(Germany) Bayern Munich	Free
1 July 2021	Josh Ruffels	Oxford United	Huddersfield Town	Free
1 July 2021	Ben Sheaf	Arsenal	Coventry City	Undisclosed
1 July 2021	Alistair Smith	Altrincham	Sutton United	Undisclosed
1 July 2021	Liam Shaw	Sheffield Wednesday	(Scotland) Celtic	Free
1 July 2021	(Netherlands) Osaze Urhoghide	Sheffield Wednesday	(Scotland) Celtic	£300,000
1 July 2021	(Netherlands) Joost van Aken	Sheffield Wednesday	(Belgium) Zulte Waregem	Free
1 July 2021	Theo Walcott	Everton	Southampton	Free
1 July 2021	(Netherlands) Georginio Wijnaldum	Liverpool	(France) Paris Saint-Germain	Free
1 July 2021	(Republic of Ireland) Conor Wilkinson	Leyton Orient	Walsall	Free
1 July 2021	Gary Woods	Oldham Athletic	(Scotland) Aberdeen	Free
1 July 2021	Ryan Woods	Stoke City	Birmingham City	Free
1 July 2021	Harrison Sohna	Aston Villa	Sunderland	Free
2 July 2021	(Brazil) Bernardo	Brighton & Hove Albion	(Austria) Red Bull Salzburg	Undisclosed
2 July 2021	(Republic of Ireland) Ryan Burke	Birmingham City	Mansfield Town	Free
2 July 2021	Sadou Diallo	Birmingham City	Mansfield Town	Free
2 July 2021	Jack Harrison	Manchester City	Leeds United	£11m
2 July 2021	Tom Heaton	Aston Villa	Manchester United	Free
2 July 2021	(Uganda) Uche Ikpeazu	Wycombe Wanderers	Middlesbrough	Undisclosed
2 July 2021	(Wales) Andy King	(Belgium) OH Leuven	Bristol City	Free
2 July 2021	Josh Knight	Leicester City	Peterborough United	Undisclosed
2 July 2021	(Nigeria) Mikel John Obi	Stoke City	Kuwait SC	Free
2 July 2021	(Nigeria) Victor Moses	Chelsea	(Russia) Spartak Moscow	Undisclosed
2 July 2021	Alex Mowatt	Barnsley	West Bromwich Albion	Free
2 July 2021	Lee Peltier	West Bromwich Albion	Middlesbrough	Free
2 July 2021	(France) Romain Perraud	(France) Brest	Southampton	Undisclosed
2 July 2021	(Netherlands) Joël Piroe	(Netherlands) PSV Eindhoven	(Wales) Swansea City	Undisclosed
2 July 2021	George Saville	Middlesbrough	Millwall	Undisclosed
2 July 2021	(France) Boubakary Soumaré	(France) Lille	Leicester City	£17m
2 July 2021	(Netherlands) Kevin van Veen	Scunthorpe United	(Scotland) Motherwell	Free
2 July 2021	Martyn Waghorn	Derby County	Coventry City	Free
3 July 2021	Rob Atkinson	Oxford United	Bristol City	Undisclosed
3 July 2021	Darius Charles	Wycombe Wanderers	AFC Wimbledon	Free
3 July 2021	(Poland) Kamil Grabara	Liverpool	(Denmark) Copenhagen	Undisclosed
3 July 2021	(Denmark) Emiliano Marcondes	Brentford	Bournemouth	Free
3 July 2021	Simon Moore	Sheffield United	Coventry City	Free
3 July 2021	(Tanzania) Mbwana Samatta	Aston Villa	(Turkey) Fenerbahçe	Undisclosed
5 July 2021	Aaron Cosgrave	Lewes	AFC Wimbledon	Free
5 July 2021	Liam Coyle	Liverpool	Accrington Stanley	Free
5 July 2021	(Scotland) Liam Kelly	Queens Park Rangers	(Scotland) Motherwell	Undisclosed
5 July 2021	John Lundstram	Sheffield United	(Scotland) Rangers	Free
5 July 2021	(Netherlands) Bruno Martins Indi	Stoke City	(Netherlands) AZ Alkmaar	Undisclosed
5 July 2021	Sam Nombe	MK Dons	Exeter City	Undisclosed
5 July 2021	(Algeria) Zaki Oualah	Leatherhead	AFC Wimbledon	Free
5 July 2021	Jamie Proctor	Wigan Athletic	Port Vale	Free
5 July 2021	(Bosnia and Herzegovina) Mario Vrančić	Norwich City	Stoke City	Free
6 July 2021	(Netherlands) Enzio Boldewijn	Notts County	Sutton United	Free
6 July 2021	Aaron Chapman	(Scotland) Motherwell	Gillingham	Free
6 July 2021	(Spain) Junior Firpo	(Spain) Barcelona	Leeds United	£13m
6 July 2021	Danny Lloyd	Tranmere Rovers	Gillingham	Free
6 July 2021	Joe Maguire	Accrington Stanley	Tranmere Rovers	Free
6 July 2021	George Marsh	Tottenham Hotspur	AFC Wimbledon	Free
6 July 2021	(Scotland) Ross Millen	(Scotland) Kilmarnock	Scunthorpe United	Free
6 July 2021	(Zambia) Enock Mwepu	(Austria) Red Bull Salzburg	Brighton & Hove Albion	Undisclosed
6 July 2021	Courtney Senior	Colchester United	(Wales) Newport County	Free
7 July 2021	(Scotland) Jordan Archer	Middlesbrough	Queens Park Rangers	Free
7 July 2021	Tom King	(Wales) Newport County	Salford City	Free
7 July 2021	(Scotland) Chris Maguire	Sunderland	Lincoln City	Free
7 July 2021	(Austria) Michael Sollbauer	Barnsley	(Germany) Dynamo Dresden	Undisclosed
7 July 2021	Harry Smith	Northampton Town	Leyton Orient	Undisclosed
7 July 2021	Sam Smith	Reading	Cambridge United	Free
7 July 2021	(Wales) Ash Taylor	(Scotland) Aberdeen	Walsall	Free
7 July 2021	Charlie Wyke	Sunderland	Wigan Athletic	Free
8 July 2021	Bradley Barry	Barrow	Stevenage	Free
8 July 2021	Joe Hardy	Liverpool	Accrington Stanley	Free
8 July 2021	(Canada) Liam Millar	Liverpool	(Switzerland) Basel	
8 July 2021	Zak Mills	Port Vale	Walsall	Free
8 July 2021	Rhys Oates	Hartlepool United	Mansfield Town	Undisclosed
8 July 2021	(France) Michael Olise	Reading	Crystal Palace	£8M
8 July 2021	Pierce Sweeney	Swindon Town	Exeter City	Free
8 July 2021	Liam Walsh	(Wales) Swansea City	Bristol City	Free
9 July 2021	(France) Rayan Aït-Nouri	(France) Angers	Wolverhampton Wanderers	Undisclosed
9 July 2021	Richie Bennett	Southport	Sutton United	Free
9 July 2021	(Republic of Ireland) Trevor Clarke	Rotherham United	Bristol Rovers	Undisclosed
9 July 2021	(Sweden) Viktor Gyökeres	Brighton & Hove Albion	Coventry City	Undisclosed
9 July 2021	Stephen Humphrys	Rochdale	Wigan Athletic	Undisclosed
9 July 2021	(Norway) Joshua King	Everton	Watford	Free
9 July 2021	Greg Leigh	(Scotland) Aberdeen	Morecambe	Free
9 July 2021	(Scotland) Dapo Mebude	(Scotland) Rangers	Watford	Free
9 July 2021	Callum McManaman	(Australia) Melbourne Victory	Tranmere Rovers	Free
9 July 2021	Sid Nelson	Tranmere Rovers	Northampton Town	Free
9 July 2021	Elliott Nevitt	Warrington Rylands	Tranmere Rovers	Undisclosed
9 July 2021	Alex Pritchard	Huddersfield Town	Sunderland	Free
9 July 2021	(Republic of Ireland) Stephen Ward	Ipswich Town	Walsall	Free
9 July 2021	(Bermuda) Ajani Burchall	Bournemouth	Aston Villa	Undisclosed
10 July 2021	Dennis Adeniran	Everton	Sheffield Wednesday	Undisclosed
10 July 2021	Jordy Hiwula	Portsmouth	Doncaster Rovers	Free
10 July 2021	(Portugal) Nuno Tavares	(Portugal) Benfica	Arsenal	£8M
11 July 2021	(Wales) Kieron Freeman	(Wales) Swansea City	Portsmouth	Free
11 July 2021	(France) Romaric Yapi	Brighton & Hove Albion	(Netherlands) Vitesse	Undisclosed
12 July 2021	Emmanuel Fernandez	Ramsgate	Peterborough United	Undisclosed
12 July 2021	(Switzerland) Alex Jankewitz	Southampton	(Switzerland) Young Boys	Undisclosed
12 July 2021	Aaron McGowan	(Scotland) Kilmarnock	Northampton Town	Free
12 July 2021	(Australia) Reagan Ogle	Accrington Stanley	Hartlepool United	Free
12 July 2021	Joe Pigott	AFC Wimbledon	Ipswich Town	Free
12 July 2021	(Australia) Mathew Ryan	Brighton & Hove Albion	(Spain) Real Sociedad	Undisclosed
13 July 2021	Harry Anderson	Lincoln City	Bristol Rovers	Free
13 July 2021	Aden Baldwin	Bristol City	MK Dons	Free
13 July 2021	David Davis	Unattached	Shrewsbury Town	Free
13 July 2021	(Republic of Ireland) Jimmy Dunne	Burnley	Queens Park Rangers	Undisclosed
13 July 2021	(Nigeria) Bright Enobakhare	(India) East Bengal	Coventry City	Free
13 July 2021	(United States) Ethan Horvath	(Belgium) Club Brugge	Nottingham Forest	Free
13 July 2021	(France) Pierre Lees-Melou	(France) Nice	Norwich City	£3.5M
13 July 2021	Remi Matthews	Sunderland	Crystal Palace	Free
13 July 2021	(Republic of Ireland) Shane McLoughlin	AFC Wimbledon	Morecambe	Free
13 July 2021	(Ghana) Jacob Mensah	Weymouth	Morecambe	Free
13 July 2021	(Portugal) Rui Patrício	Wolverhampton Wanderers	(Italy) Roma	Undisclosed
13 July 2021	(Northern Ireland) Jamie Reid	Mansfield Town	Stevenage	Undisclosed
14 July 2021	Jaden Brown	Huddersfield Town	Sheffield Wednesday	Undisclosed
14 July 2021	(Scotland) Scott Fraser	MK Dons	Ipswich Town	Undisclosed
15 July 2021	Ryan Bertrand	Southampton	Leicester City	Free
15 July 2021	(Northern Ireland) Corry Evans	Blackburn Rovers	Sunderland	Free
15 July 2021	(Sierra Leone) Sullay Kaikai	Blackpool	Wycombe Wanderers	Free
15 July 2021	(Zimbabwe) Admiral Muskwe	Leicester City	Luton Town	Undisclosed
15 July 2021	(Portugal) José Sá	(Greece) Olympiacos	Wolverhampton Wanderers	Undisclosed
16 July 2021	(Brazil) Felipe Anderson	West Ham United	(Italy) Lazio	Undisclosed
16 July 2021	(Republic of Ireland) Neill Byrne	FC Halifax Town	Hartlepool United	Undisclosed
16 July 2021	(Germany) Lukas Nmecha	Manchester City	(Germany) VfL Wolfsburg	Undisclosed
16 July 2021	Lewis Page	Exeter City	Harrogate Town	Free
16 July 2021	(Republic of Ireland) Anthony Pilkington	(India) East Bengal	Fleetwood Town	Free
16 July 2021	(Netherlands) Kjell Scherpen	(Netherlands) Ajax	Brighton & Hove Albion	Undisclosed
16 July 2021	Nathan Sheron	Fleetwood Town	Harrogate Town	Free
16 July 2021	Martin Smith	Chesterfield	Hartlepool United	Free
16 July 2021	Lewis Thompson	Blackburn Rovers	Scunthorpe United	Free
17 July 2021	(Hungary) Bendegúz Bolla	(Hungary) Fehérvár	Wolverhampton Wanderers	Undisclosed
17 July 2021	(France) Olivier Giroud	Chelsea	(Italy) AC Milan	Undisclosed
17 July 2021	(Iran) Alireza Jahanbakhsh	Brighton & Hove Albion	(Netherlands) Feyenoord	Undisclosed
17 July 2021	(Republic of Ireland) Richard Keogh	Huddersfield Town	Blackpool	Free
17 July 2021	(Wales) Adam Przybek	Ipswich Town	Wycombe Wanderers	Free
18 July 2021	Marc Guéhi	Chelsea	Crystal Palace	Undisclosed
19 July 2021	(Wales) Tom James	(Scotland) Hibernian	Leyton Orient	Free
19 July 2021	(Republic of Ireland) Ian Lawlor	Doncaster Rovers	(Scotland) Dundee	Free
19 July 2021	(Belgium) Albert Sambi Lokonga	(Belgium) Anderlecht	Arsenal	Undisclosed
19 July 2021	(Scotland) Andrew Shinnie	Charlton Athletic	(Scotland) Livingston	Free
20 July 2021	(Nigeria) Taiwo Awoniyi	Liverpool	(Germany) Union Berlin	£6.5M
20 July 2021	(Bosnia and Herzegovina) Asmir Begović	Bournemouth	Everton	Free
20 July 2021	Sean Clare	Oxford United	Charlton Athletic	Undisclosed
20 July 2021	(France) Timothee Dieng	Southend United	Exeter City	Free
20 July 2021	(Sudan) Mohamed Eisa	Peterborough United	MK Dons	Undisclosed
20 July 2021	(Northern Ireland) Shane Ferguson	Millwall	Rotherham United	Free
20 July 2021	(Serbia) Marko Grujić	Liverpool	(Portugal) Porto	£10.5M
20 July 2021	(Wales) Wayne Hennessey	Crystal Palace	Burnley	Free
20 July 2021	(Nigeria) Frank Onyeka	(Denmark) Midtjylland	Brentford	Free
20 July 2021	Jayden Reid	Birmingham City	Portsmouth	Free
20 July 2021	Andros Townsend	Crystal Palace	Everton	Free
21 July 2021	(Norway) Kristoffer Ajer	(Scotland) Celtic	Brentford	£13.5m
21 July 2021	Brendan Galloway	Luton Town	Plymouth Argyle	Free
22 July 2021	(Republic of Ireland) Sam Foley	(Scotland) Motherwell	Tranmere Rovers	Free
22 July 2021	Demarai Gray	(Germany) Bayer Leverkusen	Everton	£1.7M
22 July 2021	Jack Hunt	Bristol City	Sheffield Wednesday	Free
22 July 2021	(France) Florian Lejeune	Newcastle United	(Spain) Alavés	Undisclosed
22 July 2021	Steve Seddon	Birmingham City	Oxford United	Undisclosed
23 July 2021	(Wales) Aaron Amadi-Holloway	(India) East Bengal	Burton Albion	Free
23 July 2021	James Belshaw	Harrogate Town	Bristol Rovers	Undisclosed
23 July 2021	Rhys Bennett	Carlisle United	Gillingham	Free
23 July 2021	(Brazil) Bernard	Everton	(United Arab Emirates) Sharjah	Undisclosed
23 July 2021	Harry Bunn	York City	Scunthorpe United	Free
23 July 2021	Matt Crooks	Rotherham United	Middlesbrough	
23 July 2021	Ali Koiki	Bristol Rovers	Northampton Town	Free
23 July 2021	(Republic of Ireland) Paul McShane	Rochdale	Manchester United	Undisclosed
23 July 2021	Tyrone O'Neill	Middlesbrough	Scunthorpe United	Free
23 July 2021	Myles Peart-Harris	Chelsea	Brentford	Undisclosed
23 July 2021	Jadon Sancho	(Germany) Borussia Dortmund	Manchester United	£73M
23 July 2021	(Denmark) Lasse Sørensen	Stoke City	Lincoln City	Undisclosed
24 July 2021	(Argentina) Paulo Gazzaniga	Tottenham Hotspur	Fulham	Free
24 July 2021	(Norway) Stefan Johansen	Fulham	Queens Park Rangers	Undisclosed
24 July 2021	Callum Slattery	Southampton	(Scotland) Motherwell	Undisclosed
24 July 2021	(Wales) Harry Wilson	Liverpool	Fulham	£12M
26 July 2021	Hakeeb Adelakun	Bristol City	Lincoln City	Free
26 July 2021	(Kenya) Jonah Ayunga	Bristol Rovers	Morecambe	Undisclosed
26 July 2021	Finn Azaz	West Bromwich Albion	Aston Villa	Undisclosed
26 July 2021	(Spain) Bryan Gil	(Spain) Sevilla	Tottenham Hotspur	Undisclosed
26 July 2021	Ben Gladwin	MK Dons	Swindon Town	Undisclosed
26 July 2021	(Argentina) Erik Lamela	Tottenham Hotspur	(Spain) Sevilla	player exchange
26 July 2021	(Gabon) Mario Lemina	Southampton	(France) Nice	Undisclosed
26 July 2021	(Belgium) Obbi Oularé	(Belgium) Standard Liège	Barnsley	£1m
26 July 2021	(Spain) Diego Rico	Bournemouth	(Spain) Real Sociedad	Undisclosed
27 July 2021	(Belgium) Toby Alderweireld	Tottenham Hotspur	(Qatar) Al-Duhail SC	Undisclosed
27 July 2021	Teddy Bishop	Ipswich Town	Lincoln City	Undisclosed
27 July 2021	Conor Chaplin	Barnsley	Ipswich Town	Undisclosed
27 July 2021	George Edmundson	(Scotland) Rangers	Ipswich Town	Undisclosed
27 July 2021	Alex Perry	Wigan Athletic	Scunthorpe United	Free
27 July 2021	(France) Mamadou Sakho	Crystal Palace	(France) Montpellier	Free
27 July 2021	(Netherlands) Patrick van Aanholt	Crystal Palace	(Turkey) Galatasaray	Free
28 July 2021	(Denmark) Joachim Andersen	(France) Lyon	Crystal Palace	£14M
28 July 2021	Aidan Barlow	Unattached	Doncaster Rovers	Free
28 July 2021	Marcus Bettinelli	Fulham	Chelsea	Free
28 July 2021	(Algeria) Yasser Larouci	Liverpool	(France) Troyes	Free
28 July 2021	George Nurse	Bristol City	Shrewsbury Town	Undisclosed
28 July 2021	(Wales) Sam Vokes	Stoke City	Wycombe Wanderers	Undisclosed
28 July 2021	Jack Wakely	Chelsea	Wycombe Wanderers	Free
28 July 2021	Tennai Watson	Reading	MK Dons	Free
29 July 2021	(Democratic Republic of the Congo) Beni Baningime	Everton	(Scotland) Heart of Midlothian	Undisclosed
29 July 2021	Josh Benson	Burnley	Barnsley	Free
29 July 2021	Sam Graham	Sheffield United	Rochdale	Free
29 July 2021	Joe Tomlinson	Eastleigh	Peterborough United	Undisclosed
30 July 2021	(Scotland) Callum McFadzean	Sunderland	Crewe Alexandra	Free
30 July 2021	Moses Odubajo	Sheffield Wednesday	Queens Park Rangers	Free
30 July 2021	(Jersey) Brett Pitman	Swindon Town	Bristol Rovers	Free
30 July 2021	Ben White	Brighton & Hove Albion	Arsenal	£50M
30 July 2021	Josh Woods	Clay Brow	Accrington Stanley	Free
1 August 2021	Mark Cullen	Port Vale	Hartlepool United	Free
1 August 2021	Jake Lawlor	Harrogate Town	Hartlepool United	Free
1 August 2021	Tom Lees	Sheffield Wednesday	Huddersfield Town	Free
2 August 2021	(Germany) Julian Börner	Sheffield Wednesday	(Germany) Hannover 96	
2 August 2021	Darnell Johnson	Leicester City	Fleetwood Town	Free
2 August 2021	(Northern Ireland) Caolan Lavery	Walsall	Bradford City	Free
2 August 2021	(Belgium) Aaron Leya Iseka	(France) Toulouse	Barnsley	Undisclosed
2 August 2021	Connor Ogilvie	Gillingham	Portsmouth	Free
2 August 2021	(Ghana) Kwame Poku	Colchester United	Peterborough United	Undisclosed
2 August 2021	Adam Reach	Sheffield Wednesday	West Bromwich Albion	Free
2 August 2021	Max Taylor	Manchester United	Rochdale	Free
3 August 2021	Joe Hart	Tottenham Hotspur	(Scotland) Celtic	Undisclosed
3 August 2021	Will Mannion	Unattached	Cambridge United	Free
3 August 2021	(Republic of Ireland) James McCarthy	Crystal Palace	(Scotland) Celtic	Free
4 August 2021	(Jamaica) Leon Bailey	(Germany) Bayer Leverkusen	Aston Villa	£30m
4 August 2021	(Gibraltar) Tjay De Barr	(Gibraltar) Lincoln Red Imps	Wycombe Wanderers	Free
4 August 2021	(Italy) Mo Dabre	Unattached	Swindon Town	Free
4 August 2021	Tyler Dickinson	Queens Park Rangers	Wycombe Wanderers	Free
4 August 2021	Jordan Greenidge	Unattached	(Wales) Newport County	Free
4 August 2021	Danny Ings	Southampton	Aston Villa	Undisclosed
4 August 2021	(Northern Ireland) Jordan Jones	(Scotland) Rangers	Wigan Athletic	Undisclosed
4 August 2021	Harry McKirdy	Port Vale	Swindon Town	Free
4 August 2021	Max Ram	Unattached	Wycombe Wanderers	Free
4 August 2021	Oliver Rathbone	Rochdale	Rotherham United	Free
4 August 2021	Jack Stobbs	Unattached	Oldham Athletic	Free
4 August 2021	Sam Surridge	Bournemouth	Stoke City	Undisclosed
4 August 2021	(Montserrat) Matty Willock	Gillingham	Salford City	Free
5 August 2021	(France) Ludwig Francillette	Newcastle United	Crawley Town	Free
5 August 2021	Jack Grealish	Aston Villa	Manchester City	£100m
5 August 2021	Lee Gregory	Stoke City	Sheffield Wednesday	Undisclosed
5 August 2021	Marvin Johnson	Middlesbrough	Sheffield Wednesday	Free
5 August 2021	Jack Nolan	Walsall	Accrington Stanley	Free
5 August 2021	Jubril Okedina	Tottenham Hotspur	Cambridge United	Undisclosed
5 August 2021	(Argentina) Martín Payero	(Argentina) Banfield	Middlesbrough	Undisclosed
5 August 2021	(Wales) Jamie Thomas	Unattached	Preston North End	Free
5 August 2021	(Republic of Ireland) Aidy White	(Scotland) Heart of Midlothian	Rochdale	Free
6 August 2021	(Nigeria) Sone Aluko	Reading	Ipswich Town	Free
6 August 2021	Tyler Blackett	Nottingham Forest	(United States) FC Cincinnati	Undisclosed
6 August 2021	Joel Coleman	Fleetwood Town	Rochdale	Free
6 August 2021	Jordan Flores	Hull City	Northampton Town	Free
6 August 2021	Dan Gardner	Unattached	Doncaster Rovers	Free
6 August 2021	(Democratic Republic of the Congo) Elias Kachunga	Sheffield Wednesday	Bolton Wanderers	Free
6 August 2021	(Slovakia) Juraj Kucka	(Italy) Parma	Watford	Undisclosed
6 August 2021	Jonathan Mitchell	Derby County	Hartlepool United	Free
6 August 2021	(Canada) Ben Paton	Blackburn Rovers	(Scotland) Ross County	Free
6 August 2021	(Brazil) Matheus Pereira	West Bromwich Albion	(Saudi Arabia) Al Hilal	Undisclosed
6 August 2021	Louis Reed	Unattached	Swindon Town	Free
6 August 2021	(Angola) Elliot Simões	Barnsley	(France) Nancy	Undisclosed
7 August 2021	Jacob Blyth	Unattached	Oldham Athletic	Free
7 August 2021	(Mali) Ousseynou Cissé	Leyton Orient	Oldham Athletic	Free
7 August 2021	Ryan East	Reading	Swindon Town	Free
7 August 2021	(Jamaica) Ravel Morrison	Unattached	Derby County	Free
7 August 2021	(Republic of Ireland) Danny Rogers	(Scotland) Kilmarnock	Oldham Athletic	Free
7 August 2021	Jake Walker	Aston Villa	(Wales) Newtown	Free
9 August 2021	Luke Daniels	Brentford	Middlesbrough	Free
9 August 2021	Kyle Edwards	West Bromwich Albion	Ipswich Town	Free
9 August 2021	(Wales) Joe Morrell	Luton Town	Portsmouth	Undisclosed
9 August 2021	(United States) Josh Sargent	(Germany) Werder Bremen	Norwich City	
9 August 2021	Kyle Vassell	Rotherham United	Cheltenham Town	Free
10 August 2021	Ricky Aguiar	Worthing	Swindon Town	Free
10 August 2021	Adam Armstrong	Blackburn Rovers	Southampton	Undisclosed
10 August 2021	(Ivory Coast) Sol Bamba	(Wales) Cardiff City	Middlesbrough	Free
10 August 2021	Flynn Downes	Ipswich Town	(Wales) Swansea City	Undisclosed
10 August 2021	(Japan) Kaoru Mitoma	(Japan) Kawasaki Frontale	Brighton & Hove Albion	Undisclosed
10 August 2021	(Grenada) Oliver Norburn	Shrewsbury Town	Peterborough United	Undisclosed
10 August 2021	(Netherlands) Sylla Sow	(Netherlands) RKC Waalwijk	Sheffield Wednesday	Free
10 August 2021	(Wales) Louis Thompson	Norwich City	Portsmouth	Free
10 August 2021	(Democratic Republic of the Congo) Yoane Wissa	(France) Lorient	Brentford	Undisclosed
10 August 2021	Scott Wooton	Plymouth Argyle	Morecambe	Free
11 August 2021	Dennis Cirkin	Tottenham Hotspur	Sunderland	Undisclosed
11 August 2021	Shayon Harrison	Unattached	Morecambe	Free
11 August 2021	(Wales) George Williams	Grimsby Town	Barrow	Free
12 August 2021	(Algeria) Rachid Ghezzal	Leicester City	(Turkey) Besiktas	Undisclosed
12 August 2021	Charlie Kirk	Crewe Alexandra	Charlton Athletic	Undisclosed
12 August 2021	(Belgium) Romelu Lukaku	(Italy) Inter Milan	Chelsea	£97.5M
12 August 2021	Terell Thomas	AFC Wimbledon	Crewe Alexandra	Free
12 August 2021	(Greece) Christos Tzolis	(Greece) PAOK	Norwich City	£8.8M
13 August 2021	(Denmark) Jannik Vestergaard	Southampton	Leicester City	Undisclosed
13 August 2021	(Wales) Jonny Williams	(Wales) Cardiff City	Swindon Town	Free
13 August 2021	Joe Willock	Arsenal	Newcastle United	Undisclosed
14 August 2021	(France) Raphaël Varane	(Spain) Real Madrid	Manchester United	£34M
15 August 2021	(Australia) Cameron Burgess	Accrington Stanley	Ipswich Town	Undisclosed
16 August 2021	(Ghana) Kwesi Appiah	Unattached	Crawley Town	Free
16 August 2021	(Comoros) Fouad Bachirou	Nottingham Forest	(Cyprus) Omonoia Nicosia	Free
16 August 2021	Tom Carroll	Queens Park Rangers	Ipswich Town	Free
16 August 2021	Caleb Chukwuemeka	Northampton Town	Aston Villa	Undisclosed
16 August 2021	(Austria) Thomas Mayer	Hull City	(Austria) SKU Amstetten	Free
17 August 2021	Tammy Abraham	Chelsea	(Italy) Roma	£34M
17 August 2021	Sam Baldock	Unattached	Derby County	Free
17 August 2021	Charlie Daniels	Unattached	Colchester United	Free
17 August 2021	TJ Eyoma	Tottenham Hotspur	Lincoln City	Undisclosed
17 August 2021	Tom Huddlestone	Unattached	Hull City	Free
17 August 2021	Phil Jagielka	Unattached	Derby County	Free
17 August 2021	(Mauritania) Aboubakar Kamara	Fulham	(Greece) Aris Thessaloniki	£4M
17 August 2021	(Republic of Ireland) James McClean	Stoke City	Wigan Athletic	Undisclosed
17 August 2021	(Norway) Ørjan Nyland	Unattached	Bournemouth	Free
19 August 2021	(Netherlands) Arnaut Danjuma	Bournemouth	(Spain) Villarreal	Undisclosed
19 August 2021	(Republic of Ireland) Courtney Duffus	Bromley	Morecambe	Free
19 August 2021	Andre Green	Sheffield Wednesday	(Slovakia) Slovan Bratislava	Undisclosed
19 August 2021	(Canada) Junior Hoilett	(Wales) Cardiff City	Reading	Free
19 August 2021	Jayden Mitchell-Lawson	Derby County	Swindon Town	Free
20 August 2021	(Curaçao) Juninho Bacuna	Huddersfield Town	(Scotland) Rangers	Undisclosed
20 August 2021	Corey Blackett-Taylor	Unattached	Charlton Athletic	Free
20 August 2021	Gary Cahill	Crystal Palace	Bournemouth	Free
20 August 2021	(Wales) Niall Huggins	Leeds United	Sunderland	Free
20 August 2021	Andy Lonergan	West Bromwich Albion	Everton	Free
20 August 2021	(Spain) Rafa Mir	Wolverhampton Wanderers	(Spain) Sevilla	£13M
20 August 2021	(Norway) Martin Ødegaard	(Spain) Real Madrid	Arsenal	£30M
20 August 2021	(Brazil) Rodrigo Muniz	(Brazil) Flamengo	Fulham	Undisclosed
20 August 2021	Toyosi Olusanya	Billericay Town	Middlesbrough	Free
20 August 2021	(United States) Owen Otasowie	Wolverhampton Wanderers	(Belgium) Club Brugge	Undisclosed
20 August 2021	Aaron Ramsdale	Sheffield United	Arsenal	£24M
23 August 2021	(Hungary) Ádám Nagy	Bristol City	(Italy) Pisa	Undisclosed
23 August 2021	(Switzerland) Xherdan Shaqiri	Liverpool	(France) Lyon	£9.5M
23 August 2021	(Spain) Mamadou Sylla	Aston Villa	(Spain) Almería	Undisclosed
24 August 2021	Colin Daniel	Burton Albion	Exeter City	Free
24 August 2021	(Republic of Ireland) Liam Kelly	(Netherlands) Feyenoord	Rochdale	Free
24 August 2021	Connor Parsons	Unattached	Wycombe Wanderers	Free
24 August 2021	(Italy) Davide Zappacosta	Chelsea	(Italy) Atalanta	Undisclosed
25 August 2021	Jack Baldwin	Bristol Rovers	(Scotland) Ross County	Free
25 August 2021	Aaron Lennon	Unattached	Burnley	Free
25 August 2021	(Brazil) Lyanco	(Italy) Torino	Southampton	Undisclosed
25 August 2021	Ike Ugbo	Chelsea	(Belgium) Genk	Undisclosed
26 August 2021	(Portugal) Bruno Andrade	Salford City	Stevenage	Free
26 August 2021	Mitch Clark	Leicester City	Accrington Stanley	Undisclosed
26 August 2021	Brandon Hanlan	Bristol Rovers	Wycombe Wanderers	Free
26 August 2021	(France) Maxime Le Marchand	Fulham	(France) Strasbourg	Undisclosed
26 August 2021	(Nigeria) Isaac Success	Watford	(Italy) Udinese	Undisclosed
26 August 2021	(South Africa) Percy Tau	Brighton & Hove Albion	(Egypt) Al Ahly	Undisclosed
27 August 2021	(Croatia) Alen Halilović	Birmingham City	Reading	Free
27 August 2021	(Senegal) Pape Matar Sarr	(France) Metz	Tottenham Hotspur	Undisclosed
27 August 2021	(France) Moussa Sissoko	Tottenham Hotspur	Watford	£3M
27 August 2021	Tyler Smith	Sheffield United	Hull City	Undisclosed
28 August 2021	Will Hughes	Watford	Crystal Palace	£6M
28 August 2021	(France) Kurt Zouma	Chelsea	West Ham United	£29.8M
29 August 2021	(Ivory Coast) Maxwel Cornet	(France) Lyon	Burnley	£12.85M
30 August 2021	Scott Dann	Crystal Palace	Reading	Free
30 August 2021	Troy Deeney	Watford	Birmingham City	Free
30 August 2021	Joe Garner	(Cyprus) APOEL	Fleetwood Town	Free
30 August 2021	Jordan Gibson	(Republic of Ireland) Sligo Rovers	Carlisle United	Undisclosed
30 August 2021	Luke Hendrie	Grimsby Town	Hartlepool United	Free
30 August 2021	Scott Kashket	Wycombe Wanderers	Crewe Alexandra	Free
30 August 2021	George Tanner	Carlisle United	Bristol City	Undisclosed
31 August 2021	(Burundi) Saido Berahino	(Belgium) Zulte Waregem	Sheffield Wednesday	Undisclosed
31 August 2021	Junior Brown	Unattached	Bristol Rovers	Free
31 August 2021	(Scotland) Ryan Christie	(Scotland) Celtic	Bournemouth	Undisclosed
31 August 2021	Leon Clarke	Unattached	Bristol Rovers	Free
31 August 2021	(Spain) Marc Cucurella	(Spain) Getafe	Brighton & Hove Albion	£15.4M
31 August 2021	(Thailand) Ben Davis	Fulham	Oxford United	Undisclosed
31 August 2021	(Tunisia) Mohamed Dräger	(Greece) Olympiacos	Nottingham Forest	Undisclosed
31 August 2021	Mark Duffy	Fleetwood Town	Tranmere Rovers	Free
31 August 2021	Demeaco Duhaney	Huddersfield Town	Stoke City	Free
31 August 2021	(France) Odsonne Édouard	(Scotland) Celtic	Crystal Palace	£14M
31 August 2021	Tayo Edun	Lincoln City	Blackburn Rovers	Undisclosed
31 August 2021	Antony Evans	Unattached	Bristol Rovers	Free
31 August 2021	Robbie Gotts	Leeds United	Barrow	Free
31 August 2021	(Wales) Daniel James	Manchester United	Leeds United	£25M
31 August 2021	Todd Kane	Queens Park Rangers	Coventry City	Undisclosed
31 August 2021	(Scotland) Jason Kerr	(Scotland) St Johnstone	Wigan Athletic	Undisclosed
31 August 2021	Charlie Lakin	Birmingham City	Burton Albion	Undisclosed
31 August 2021	(Scotland) Sam Lavelle	Morecambe	Charlton Athletic	Undisclosed
31 August 2021	Jordan Lawrence-Gabriel	Nottingham Forest	Blackpool	Undisclosed
31 August 2021	(Scotland) Donald Love	Shrewsbury Town	Salford City	Free
31 August 2021	Jamal Lowe	(Wales) Swansea City	Bournemouth	Undisclosed
31 August 2021	Nicky Maynard	Mansfield Town	Tranmere Rovers	Free
31 August 2021	Kelvin Mellor	Morecambe	Carlisle United	Free
31 August 2021	(Egypt) Sam Morsy	Middlesbrough	Ipswich Town	Undisclosed
31 August 2021	(Republic of Ireland) Michael Obafemi	Southampton	(Wales) Swansea City	Undisclosed
31 August 2021	(Paraguay) Braian Ojeda	(Paraguay) Club Olimpia	Nottingham Forest	Undisclosed
31 August 2021	Callum Reilly	AFC Wimbledon	Leyton Orient	Free
31 August 2021	(Wales) Connor Roberts	(Wales) Swansea City	Burnley	Undisclosed
31 August 2021	(Scotland) Jamie Robson	(Scotland) Dundee United	Lincoln City	Undisclosed
31 August 2021	(Portugal) Cristiano Ronaldo	(Italy) Juventus	Manchester United	£12.85M
31 August 2021	(Venezuela) Salomón Rondón	(China) Dalian Professional	Everton	Free
31 August 2021	(Brazil) Emerson Royal	(Spain) Barcelona	Tottenham Hotspur	£25.8M
31 August 2021	(Wales) Alex Samuel	Wycombe Wanderers	(Scotland) Ross County	Free
31 August 2021	(Portugal) Xande Silva	West Ham United	Nottingham Forest	Undisclosed
31 August 2021	(Senegal) Abdallah Sima	(Czech Republic) Slavia Prague	Brighton & Hove Albion	Undisclosed
31 August 2021	Jordan Stevens	Leeds United	Barrow	Free
31 August 2021	Kyle Taylor	Bournemouth	Exeter City	Undisclosed
31 August 2021	(Japan) Takehiro Tomiyasu	(Italy) Bologna	Arsenal	Undisclosed
31 August 2021	(Croatia) Nikola Vlašić	(Russia) CSKA Moscow	West Ham United	Undisclosed
1 September 2021	Nathaniel Chalobah	Watford	Fulham	Undisclosed
1 September 2021	(Northern Ireland) Ali McCann	(Scotland) St Johnstone	Preston North End	Undisclosed
1 September 2021	(France) Olivier Ntcham	(Scotland) Celtic	(Wales) Swansea City	Free
1 September 2021	(Jamaica) Theo Robinson	Port Vale	Bradford City	Free
2 September 2021	(Brazil) Rodrigo Ely	Unattached	Nottingham Forest	Free
3 September 2021	(Northern Ireland) Danny Amos	Unattached	Port Vale	Free
4 September 2021	(Republic of Ireland) Glenn Whelan	Unattached	Bristol Rovers	Free

== Loans ==
Start date	End date	Name	Moving from	Moving to
8 April 2021	30 June 2021	Josef Bursik	Stoke City	Peterborough United
19 May 2021	30 June 2021	Josef Bursik	Stoke City	Lincoln City
19 May 2021	1 January 2022	(Australia) Riley McGree	(United States) Charlotte FC	Birmingham City
10 June 2021	30 June 2022	Adam Lewis	Liverpool	(Scotland) Livingston
11 June 2021	30 June 2022	Ryan Edmondson	Leeds United	Fleetwood Town
14 June 2021	30 June 2022	Teddy Jenks	Brighton & Hove Albion	(Scotland) Aberdeen
15 June 2021	30 June 2022	(Ghana) Joseph Anang	West Ham United	Stevenage
16 June 2021	30 June 2022	Callum Jones	Hull City	Morecambe
17 June 2021	30 June 2022	Connor Taylor	Stoke City	Bristol Rovers
21 June 2021	30 June 2022	(Austria) Patrick Schmidt	Barnsley	(Denmark) Esbjerg fB
21 June 2021	30 June 2022	(Netherlands) Sepp van den Berg	Liverpool	Preston North End
22 June 2021	30 June 2022	Jordan Flores	Hull City	Northampton Town
22 June 2021	30 June 2022	Kayne Ramsay	Southampton	Crewe Alexandra
24 June 2021	30 June 2022	Nathan Bishop	Manchester United	Mansfield Town
24 June 2021	30 June 2022	(Greece) Konstantinos Mavropanos	Arsenal	(Germany) VfB Stuttgart
25 June 2021	30 June 2022	Nathan Baxter	Chelsea	Hull City
25 June 2021	30 June 2022	Levi Colwill	Chelsea	Huddersfield Town
25 June 2021	30 June 2022	George Shelvey	Nottingham Forest	Mansfield Town
26 June 2021	30 June 2022	(Zimbabwe) Macauley Bonne	Queens Park Rangers	Ipswich Town
27 June 2021	30 June 2022	Xavier Amaechi	(Germany) Hamburger SV	Bolton Wanderers
27 June 2021	30 June 2022	Alex Cochrane	Brighton & Hove Albion	(Scotland) Heart of Midlothian
27 June 2021	30 June 2022	Taylor Harwood-Bellis	Manchester City	(Belgium) Anderlecht
29 June 2021	30 June 2022	(Portugal) Toti	Wolverhampton Wanderers	(Switzerland) Grasshoppers
30 June 2021	30 June 2022	Hayden Muller	Millwall	(Scotland) St Johnstone
1 July 2021	30 June 2022	(Northern Ireland) Daniel Ballard	Arsenal	Millwall
1 July 2021	30 June 2022	(Republic of Ireland) Gavin Bazunu	Manchester City	Portsmouth
1 July 2021	30 June 2022	Josh Martin	Norwich City	MK Dons
1 July 2021	30 June 2022	(Scotland) Josh McPake	(Scotland) Rangers	Morecambe
1 July 2021	30 June 2022	(Sweden) Joel Mumbongo	Burnley	Accrington Stanley
1 July 2021	30 June 2022	Ethan Robson	Blackpool	MK Dons
1 July 2021	30 June 2022	James Trafford	Manchester City	Accrington Stanley
2 July 2021	30 June 2022	(Democratic Republic of the Congo) Benik Afobe	Stoke City	Millwall
2 July 2021	30 June 2022	(Scotland) Jack Aitchison	Barnsley	Forest Green Rovers
2 July 2021	30 June 2022	(Wales) Daniel Barden	Norwich City	(Scotland) Livingston
2 July 2021	30 June 2022	(Wales) Cameron Coxe	Solihull Moors	Colchester United
2 July 2021	30 June 2022	Reece Devine	Manchester United	(Scotland) St Johnstone
2 July 2021	30 June 2022	(Scotland) Lewis Fiorini	Manchester City	Lincoln City
2 July 2021	30 June 2022	(Scotland) Billy Gilmour	Chelsea	Norwich City
2 July 2021	30 June 2022	Paul Glatzel	Liverpool	Tranmere Rovers
2 July 2021	30 June 2022	(Northern Ireland) Alfie McCalmont	Leeds United	Morecambe
2 July 2021	30 June 2022	Jake Vokins	Southampton	(Scotland) Ross County
4 July 2021	30 June 2022	(Portugal) Francisco Trincão	(Spain) Barcelona	Wolverhampton Wanderers
5 July 2021	30 June 2022	Alexander Robertson	Manchester City	(Scotland) Ross County
5 July 2021	30 June 2022	(Cyprus) Nicholas Ioannou	Nottingham Forest	(Italy) Como
5 July 2021	30 June 2022	Matt Smith	Arsenal	Doncaster Rovers
6 July 2021	30 June 2022	(Netherlands) Juan Castillo	Chelsea	Birmingham City
6 July 2021	30 June 2022	(France) Matteo Guendouzi	Arsenal	(France) Marseille
7 July 2021	30 June 2022	Ryan Longman	Brighton & Hove Albion	Hull City
7 July 2021	31 December 2021	(United States) Indiana Vassilev	Aston Villa	(United States) Inter Miami
8 July 2021	30 June 2022	Akin Famewo	Norwich City	Charlton Athletic
8 July 2021	30 June 2022	Max Watters	(Wales) Cardiff City	MK Dons
9 July 2021	30 June 2022	(Netherlands) Tahith Chong	Manchester United	Birmingham City
9 July 2021	30 June 2022	(Nigeria) Peter Etebo	Stoke City	Watford
9 July 2021	30 June 2022	Jacob Maddox	(Portugal) Vitória de Guimarães	Burton Albion
9 July 2021	30 June 2022	(Wales) Sion Spence	Crystal Palace	Bristol Rovers
9 July 2021	30 June 2022	(Portugal) Rúben Vinagre	Wolverhampton Wanderers	(Portugal) Sporting CP
10 July 2021	30 June 2022	Luke Thomas	Barnsley	Bristol Rovers
11 July 2021	30 June 2022	Corey Panter	Luton Town	(Scotland) Dundee
11 July 2021	30 June 2022	(Croatia) Lovre Kalinić	Aston Villa	(Croatia) Hajduk Split
11 July 2021	30 June 2022	(Republic of Ireland) Olamide Shodipo	Queens Park Rangers	Sheffield Wednesday
12 July 2021	30 June 2022	(Spain) Kiko Casilla	Leeds United	(Spain) Elche
12 July 2021	30 June 2022	Lewis Cass	Newcastle United	Port Vale
12 July 2021	30 June 2022	Sam McCallum	Norwich City	Queens Park Rangers
12 July 2021	30 June 2022	Kieran Phillips	Huddersfield Town	Walsall
13 July 2021	30 June 2022	Matt Clarke	Brighton & Hove Albion	West Bromwich Albion
13 July 2021	30 June 2022	Ryan Giles	Wolverhampton Wanderers	(Wales) Cardiff City
13 July 2021	30 June 2022	Jensen Weir	Brighton & Hove Albion	Cambridge United
14 July 2021	30 June 2022	Dan Nlundulu	Southampton	Lincoln City
15 July 2021	30 June 2022	Carl Rushworth	Brighton & Hove Albion	Walsall
15 July 2021	30 June 2022	(France) William Saliba	Arsenal	(France) Marseille
16 July 2021	30 June 2022	(Ecuador) Leonardo Campana	Wolverhampton Wanderers	(Switzerland) Grasshoppers
16 July 2021	30 June 2022	Callum Doyle	Manchester City	Sunderland
16 July 2021	30 June 2022	(Wales) Rollin Menayese	Mansfield Town	Walsall
16 July 2021	30 June 2022	(Cameroon) Blondy Nna Noukeu	Stoke City	Crawley Town
16 July 2021	30 June 2022	(Hungary) Ákos Onódi	Aston Villa	Bromsgrove Sporting
16 July 2021	30 June 2022	(Scotland) Aaron Pressley	Brentford	AFC Wimbledon
17 July 2021	30 June 2022	(Hungary) Bendegúz Bolla	Wolverhampton Wanderers	(Switzerland) Grasshoppers
19 July 2021	30 June 2022	(Turkey) Tiago Cukur	Watford	Doncaster Rovers
19 July 2021	30 June 2022	Dion Sanderson	Wolverhampton Wanderers	Birmingham City
20 July 2021	30 June 2022	(Morocco) Gassan Ahadme	Norwich City	Portsmouth
20 July 2021	30 June 2022	(Denmark) Lukas Jensen	Burnley	Carlisle United
23 July 2021	30 June 2022	(Iceland) Jökull Andrésson	Reading	Morecambe
23 July 2021	30 June 2022	Will Fish	Manchester United	Stockport County
23 July 2021	30 June 2022	(Trinidad and Tobago) Daniel Phillips	Watford	Gillingham
24 July 2021	30 June 2022	(Italy) Pierluigi Gollini	(Italy) Atalanta	Tottenham Hotspur
24 July 2021	30 June 2022	Josh Griffiths	West Bromwich Albion	Lincoln City
26 July 2021	30 June 2022	Finn Azaz	Aston Villa	(Wales) Newport County
26 July 2021	30 June 2022	Tom Billson	Coventry City	Scunthorpe United
26 July 2021	30 June 2022	Jamie Cumming	Chelsea	Gillingham
26 July 2021	30 June 2022	Henry Lawrence	Chelsea	AFC Wimbledon
26 July 2021	30 June 2022	(Montenegro) Matija Sarkic	Wolverhampton Wanderers	Birmingham City
27 July 2021	30 June 2022	Leif Davis	Leeds United	Bournemouth
27 July 2021	30 June 2022	Callum Morton	West Bromwich Albion	Fleetwood Town
27 July 2021	30 June 2022	(Northern Ireland) Bailey Peacock-Farrell	Burnley	Sheffield Wednesday
27 July 2021	30 June 2022	Adam Phillips	Burnley	Morecambe
27 July 2021	30 June 2022	Ryan Stirk	Birmingham City	Mansfield Town
27 July 2021	30 June 2022	Lewis Wing	Middlesbrough	Sheffield Wednesday
28 July 2021	30 June 2022	Timmy Abraham	Fulham	(Wales) Newport County
28 July 2021	20 November 2021	Nahum Melvin-Lambert	Reading	(Republic of Ireland) St Patrick's Athletic
28 July 2021	30 June 2022	Sebastian Revan	Aston Villa	Grimsby Town
28 July 2021	30 June 2022	(Luxembourg) Danel Sinani	Norwich City	Huddersfield Town
29 July 2021	30 June 2022	(Scotland) Theo Archibald	Lincoln City	Leyton Orient
29 July 2021	30 June 2022	(France) Alphonse Areola	(France) Paris Saint-Germain	West Ham United
29 July 2021	30 June 2022	(Wales) Ryan Broom	Peterborough United	Plymouth Argyle
29 July 2021	30 June 2022	(Azerbaijan) Renat Dadashov	Wolverhampton Wanderers	(Portugal) Tondela
29 July 2021	30 June 2022	Cameron Dawson	Sheffield Wednesday	Exeter City
29 July 2021	30 June 2022	Conor Gallagher	Chelsea	Crystal Palace
29 July 2021	30 June 2022	Nathan Holland	West Ham United	Oxford United
29 July 2021	30 June 2022	Tyreece John-Jules	Arsenal	Blackpool
29 July 2021	30 June 2022	(Republic of Ireland) Troy Parrott	Tottenham Hotspur	MK Dons
30 July 2021	30 June 2022	Di'Shon Bernard	Manchester United	Hull City
30 July 2021	30 June 2022	Zach Jeacock	Birmingham City	Salford City
30 July 2021	30 June 2022	(Albania) Florian Kamberi	(Switzerland) St. Gallen	Sheffield Wednesday
30 July 2021	30 June 2022	(Netherlands) Ian Maatsen	Chelsea	Coventry City
31 July 2021	30 June 2022	Tyreece Simpson	Ipswich Town	Swindon Town
31 July 2021	30 June 2022	(Northern Ireland) Gavin Whyte	(Wales) Cardiff City	Oxford United
1 August 2021	30 June 2022	Jordan Thorniley	Blackpool	Oxford United
2 August 2021	30 June 2022	Harry Clarke	Arsenal	(Scotland) Ross County
2 August 2021	30 June 2022	(Canada) Theo Corbeanu	Wolverhampton Wanderers	Sheffield Wednesday
2 August 2021	30 June 2022	Kion Etete	Tottenham Hotspur	Northampton Town
2 August 2021	30 June 2022	Kaine Kesler	Aston Villa	Swindon Town
3 August 2021	30 June 2022	George Broadbent	Sheffield United	Rochdale
3 August 2021	30 June 2022	Will Ferry	Southampton	Crawley Town
3 August 2021	30 June 2022	George Hirst	Leicester City	Portsmouth
3 August 2021	30 June 2022	(Republic of Ireland) Corey O'Keeffe	Mansfield Town	Rochdale
3 August 2021	30 June 2022	Tyrese Shade	Leicester City	Walsall
4 August 2021	30 June 2022	(Scotland) Ross Doohan	(Scotland) Celtic	Tranmere Rovers
4 August 2021	30 June 2022	Rarmani Edmonds-Green	Huddersfield Town	Rotherham United
4 August 2021	30 June 2022	(Denmark) Daniel Iversen	Leicester City	Preston North End
4 August 2021	30 June 2022	(Bulgaria) Sylvester Jasper	Fulham	Colchester United
4 August 2021	30 June 2022	(Scotland) Dapo Mebude	Watford	AFC Wimbledon
5 August 2021	1 January 2022	Tyler Burey	Millwall	Hartlepool United
5 August 2021	30 June 2022	Taylor Perry	Wolverhampton Wanderers	Cheltenham Town
5 August 2021	30 June 2022	Callum Wright	Leicester City	Cheltenham Town
6 August 2021	30 June 2022	(Germany) Festus Arthur	Hull City	Barrow
6 August 2021	30 June 2022	Louie Barry	Aston Villa	Ipswich Town
6 August 2021	30 June 2022	(Scotland) Jack Burroughs	Coventry City	(Scotland) Ross County
6 August 2021	30 June 2022	Danny Cashman	Coventry City	Rochdale
6 August 2021	30 June 2022	Romoney Crichlow	Huddersfield Town	Swindon Town
6 August 2021	30 June 2022	(Sweden) Pontus Dahlberg	Watford	Doncaster Rovers
6 August 2021	30 June 2022	(Finland) Niko Hämäläinen	Queens Park Rangers	(United States) LA Galaxy
6 August 2021	30 June 2022	(Australia) Ashley Maynard-Brewer	Charlton Athletic	(Scotland) Ross County
6 August 2021	30 June 2022	(Argentina) Cristian Romero	(Italy) Atalanta	Tottenham Hotspur
6 August 2021	30 June 2022	(Wales) Matt Smith	Manchester City	Hull City
7 August 2021	30 June 2022	(Republic of Ireland) Jamie Bowden	Tottenham Hotspur	Oldham Athletic
7 August 2021	30 June 2022	Lewis Gibson	Everton	Sheffield Wednesday
7 August 2021	30 June 2022	Jake Turner	Newcastle United	Colchester United
7 August 2021	30 June 2022	(Denmark) Philip Zinckernagel	Watford	Nottingham Forest
8 August 2021	30 June 2022	Axel Tuanzebe	Manchester United	Aston Villa
9 August 2021	30 June 2022	Odin Bailey	Birmingham City	(Scotland) Livingston
9 August 2021	30 June 2022	Hayden Coulson	Middlesbrough	Ipswich Town
9 August 2021	30 June 2022	Kelland Watts	Newcastle United	Wigan Athletic
10 August 2021	30 June 2022	(Republic of Ireland) Padraig Amond	(Wales) Newport County	Exeter City
10 August 2021	30 June 2022	Josh Andrews	Birmingham City	Rochdale
10 August 2021	30 June 2022	(Albania) Armando Broja	Chelsea	Southampton
10 August 2021	30 June 2022	(Japan) Kaoru Mitoma	Brighton & Hove Albion	(Belgium) Union SG
10 August 2021	30 June 2022	Jordi Osei-Tutu	Arsenal	Nottingham Forest
10 August 2021	30 June 2022	(Norway) Leo Østigård	Brighton & Hove Albion	Stoke City
11 August 2021	30 June 2022	Sam Cosgrove	Birmingham City	Shrewsbury Town
11 August 2021	30 June 2022	Will Goodwin	Stoke City	Hartlepool United
12 August 2021	30 June 2022	(Nigeria) Tom Dele-Bashiru	Watford	Reading
13 August 2021	30 June 2022	(Denmark) Frederik Alves	West Ham United	Sunderland
13 August 2021	30 June 2022	Jake Clarke-Salter	Chelsea	Coventry City
13 August 2021	30 June 2022	(Northern Ireland) Ethan Galbraith	Manchester United	Doncaster Rovers
13 August 2021	30 June 2022	(Scotland) Marc McNulty	Reading	(Scotland) Dundee United
16 August 2021	30 June 2022	(Wales) Nathan Broadhead	Everton	Sunderland
16 August 2021	30 June 2022	Leighton Clarkson	Liverpool	Blackburn Rovers
16 August 2021	30 June 2022	Ben Davies	Liverpool	Sheffield United
16 August 2021	30 June 2022	Ethan Laird	Manchester United	(Wales) Swansea City
16 August 2021	30 June 2022	(Romania) Dennis Politic	Bolton Wanderers	Port Vale
16 August 2021	30 June 2022	Brad Young	Aston Villa	Carlisle United
17 August 2021	30 June 2022	(Spain) Álvaro Fernández	(Spain) Huesca	Brentford
17 August 2021	30 June 2022	Joseph Hungbo	Watford	(Scotland) Ross County
17 August 2021	30 June 2022	(Belgium) Tyrese Omotoye	Norwich City	Leyton Orient
17 August 2021	24 August 2022	Laurie Walker	MK Dons	Oldham Athletic
17 August 2021	30 June 2022	(Republic of Ireland) Tyreik Wright	Aston Villa	Salford City
18 August 2021	30 June 2022	(Belgium) Michy Batshuayi	Chelsea	(Turkey) Beşiktaş
18 August 2021	31 September 2022	Hamzad Kargbo	Queens Park Rangers	Southend United
18 August 2021	30 June 2022	(Brazil) Kenedy	Chelsea	(Brazil) Flamengo
18 August 2021	30 June 2022	(Croatia) Karlo Žiger	Chelsea	(Slovenia) Rudar Velenje
19 August 2021	30 June 2022	Daniel Adshead	Norwich City	Gillingham
19 August 2021	30 June 2022	(South Africa) Khanya Leshabela	Leicester City	Shrewsbury Town
19 August 2021	30 June 2022	(Turkey) Ozan Tufan	(Turkey) Fenerbahçe	Watford
19 August 2021	30 June 2022	Faysal Bettache	Queens Park Rangers	Oldham Athletic
19 August 2021	30 June 2022	Owura Edwards	Bristol City	Exeter City
19 August 2021	30 June 2022	Jeriel Dorsett	Reading	Rochdale
19 August 2021	30 June 2022	(Wales) Dylan Levitt	Manchester United	(Scotland) Dundee United
19 August 2021	30 June 2022	(United States) Matt Miazga	Chelsea	(Spain) Alavés
19 August 2021	30 June 2022	Arjan Raikhy	Aston Villa	Stockport County
19 August 2021	30 June 2022	(Saint Kitts and Nevis) Romaine Sawyers	West Bromwich Albion	Stoke City
19 August 2021	30 June 2022	(Scotland) James Scott	Hull City	(Scotland) Hibernian
19 August 2021	30 June 2022	Jake Scrimshaw	Bournemouth	Scunthorpe United
19 August 2021	30 June 2022	Sam Sherring	Bournemouth	Accrington Stanley
20 August 2021	30 June 2022	(Democratic Republic of the Congo) Christian Maghoma	Gillingham	Eastleigh
21 August 2021	30 June 2022	Faysal Bettache	Queens Park Rangers	Oldham Athletic
21 August 2021	1 January 2022	(Republic of Ireland) Conor Masterson	Queens Park Rangers	Cambridge United
21 August 2021	30 June 2022	(Republic of Ireland) Corrie Ndaba	Ipswich Town	Salford City
21 August 2021	30 June 2022	(Brazil) Andreas Pereira	Manchester United	(Brazil) Flamengo
22 August 2021	30 June 2022	James Garner	Manchester United	Nottingham Forest
23 August 2021	30 June 2022	(Romania) Florin Andone	Brighton & Hove Albion	(Spain) Cádiz
23 August 2021	30 June 2022	Ian Poveda	Leeds United	Blackburn Rovers
23 August 2021	30 June 2022	Morgan Rogers	Manchester City	Bournemouth
23 August 2021	30 June 2022	Brandon Williams	Manchester United	Norwich City
23 August 2021	30 June 2022	(Wales) Ben Woodburn	Liverpool	(Scotland) Heart of Midlothian
24 August 2021	30 June 2022	Austin Samuels	Wolverhampton Wanderers	(Scotland) Aberdeen
24 August 2021	30 June 2022	(Portugal) João Virgínia	Everton	(Portugal) Sporting Lisbon
25 August 2021	30 June 2022	Chuba Akpom	Middlesbrough	(Greece) PAOK
25 August 2021	30 June 2022	Jordan Hugill	Norwich City	West Bromwich Albion
25 August 2021	30 June 2022	(Uruguay) Lucas Torreira	Arsenal	(Italy) Fiorentina
26 August 2021	30 June 2022	Elliott Lee	Luton Town	Charlton Athletic
27 August 2021	30 June 2022	Tom Bayliss	Preston North End	Wigan Athletic
27 August 2021	30 June 2022	Callum Johnson	Portsmouth	Fleetwood Town
27 August 2021	30 June 2022	Matty Longstaff	Newcastle United	(Scotland) Aberdeen
27 August 2021	30 June 2022	Max Lowe	Sheffield United	Nottingham Forest
27 August 2021	30 June 2022	Luke Matheson	Wolverhampton Wanderers	(Scotland) Hamilton Academical
27 August 2021	30 June 2022	(Republic of Ireland) Jayson Molumby	Brighton & Hove Albion	West Bromwich Albion
27 August 2021	30 June 2022	Taylor Moore	Bristol City	(Scotland) Heart of Midlothian
27 August 2021	30 June 2022	(Ghana) Baba Rahman	Chelsea	Reading
28 August 2021	30 June 2022	Ryan Wintle	(Wales) Cardiff City	Blackpool
29 August 2021	30 June 2022	(South Korea) Hwang Hee-chan	(Germany) RB Leipzig	Wolverhampton Wanderers
29 August 2021	30 June 2022	(Cuba) Onel Hernández	Norwich City	Middlesbrough
29 August 2021	30 June 2022	(Norway) Mathias Normann	(Russia) Rostov	Norwich City
29 August 2021	30 June 2022	(Netherlands) Jan Paul van Hecke	Brighton & Hove Albion	Blackburn Rovers
30 August 2021	30 June 2022	Miguel Azeez	Arsenal	Portsmouth
30 August 2021	30 June 2023	(France) Tiémoué Bakayoko	Chelsea	(Italy) AC Milan
30 August 2021	30 June 2022	Danny Drinkwater	Chelsea	Reading
30 August 2021	30 June 2022	(Republic of Ireland) Conor Hourihane	Aston Villa	Sheffield United
30 August 2021	30 June 2022	(Turkey) Ozan Kabak	(Germany) FC Schalke 04	Norwich City
30 August 2021	30 June 2022	Herbie Kane	Barnsley	Oxford United
30 August 2021	30 June 2022	George Lloyd	Cheltenham Town	Port Vale
30 August 2021	30 June 2022	(Republic of Ireland) Mipo Odubeko	West Ham United	Huddersfield Town
30 August 2021	30 June 2022	Mattie Pollock	Watford	Cheltenham Town
30 August 2021	30 June 2022	(Scotland) Scott Robertson	(Scotland) Celtic	Crewe Alexandra
30 August 2021	30 June 2022	Andy Smith	Hull City	Salford City
30 August 2021	30 June 2022	Christian Walton	Brighton & Hove Albion	Ipswich Town
30 August 2021	30 June 2022	(Switzerland) Andi Zeqiri	Brighton & Hove Albion	(Germany) FC Augsburg
31 August 2021	30 June 2022	(Colombia) Jaime Alvarado	Watford	(Spain) Racing de Ferrol
31 August 2021	30 June 2022	(Wales) Ethan Ampadu	Chelsea	(Italy) Venezia
31 August 2021	30 June 2022	(Republic of Ireland) Harry Arter	Nottingham Forest	Charlton Athletic
31 August 2021	30 June 2022	Amrit Bansal-McNulty	Queens Park Rangers	Crawley Town
31 August 2021	30 June 2022	(Spain) Héctor Bellerín	Arsenal	(Spain) Real Betis
31 August 2021	30 June 2022	J'Neil Bennett	Tottenham Hotspur	Crewe Alexandra
31 August 2021	30 June 2022	Mungo Bridge	Aston Villa	(France) Annecy
31 August 2021	1 January 2022	Jake Cain	Liverpool	(Wales) Newport County
31 August 2021	30 June 2022	(United States) Cameron Carter-Vickers	Tottenham Hotspur	(Scotland) Celtic
31 August 2021	30 June 2022	(Kosovo) Bersant Celina	(France) Dijon	Ipswich Town
31 August 2021	30 June 2022	Oli Cooper	(Wales) Swansea City	(Wales) Newport County
31 August 2021	30 June 2022	(Portugal) Hélder Costa	Leeds United	(Spain) Valencia
31 August 2021	30 June 2022	(Republic of Ireland) Conor Coventry	West Ham United	Peterborough United
31 August 2021	1 January 2022	(Scotland) Ali Crawford	Bolton Wanderers	(Scotland) St Johnstone
31 August 2021	30 June 2022	Harry Chapman	Blackburn Rovers	Burton Albion
31 August 2021	30 June 2022	(Germany) Leon Dajaku	(Germany) Union Berlin	Sunderland
31 August 2021	30 June 2022	Jack Diamond	Sunderland	Harrogate Town
31 August 2021	30 June 2022	Jonathan Dinzeyi	Arsenal	Carlisle United
31 August 2021	30 June 2022	(Albania) Armando Dobra	Ipswich Town	Colchester United
31 August 2021	30 June 2022	Tommy Doyle	Manchester City	(Germany) Hamburger SV
31 August 2021	30 June 2022	Will Forrester	Stoke City	Mansfield Town
31 August 2021	30 June 2022	Morgan Gibbs-White	Wolverhampton Wanderers	Sheffield United
31 August 2021	30 June 2022	Alex Gilbert	Brentford	Swindon Town
31 August 2021	30 June 2022	(France) Claudio Gomes	Manchester City	Barnsley
31 August 2021	30 June 2022	Andre Gray	Watford	Queens Park Rangers
31 August 2021	30 June 2022	(Northern Ireland) Will Grigg	Sunderland	Rotherham United
31 August 2021	30 June 2022	(France) Frédéric Guilbert	Aston Villa	(France) Strasbourg
31 August 2021	30 June 2022	Hayden Hackney	Middlesbrough	Scunthorpe United
31 August 2021	30 June 2022	(Venezuela) Yangel Herrera	Manchester City	(Spain) Espanyol
31 August 2021	30 June 2022	(Germany) Ron-Thorben Hoffmann	(Germany) Bayern Munich	Sunderland
31 August 2021	30 June 2022	Sam Hughes	Leicester City	Burton Albion
31 August 2021	30 June 2022	Eddy Jones	Stoke City	Hartlepool United
31 August 2021	30 June 2022	Kyle Joseph	(Wales) Swansea City	Cheltenham Town
31 August 2021	30 June 2023	(Italy) Moise Kean	Everton	(Italy) Juventus
31 August 2021	30 June 2022	(United States) Charlie Kelman	Queens Park Rangers	Gillingham
31 August 2021	30 June 2022	(Germany) Reda Khadra	Brighton & Hove Albion	Blackburn Rovers
31 August 2021	30 June 2022	(Republic of Ireland) Peter Kioso	Luton Town	MK Dons
31 August 2021	30 June 2022	(Czech Republic) Alex Král	(Russia) Spartak Moscow	West Ham United
31 August 2021	30 June 2022	(France) James Léa Siliki	(France) Rennes	Middlesbrough
31 August 2021	30 June 2022	Jonathan Leko	Birmingham City	Charlton Athletic
31 August 2021	30 June 2022	(Netherlands) Nigel Lonwijk	Wolverhampton Wanderers	(Netherlands) Fortuna Sittard
31 August 2021	30 June 2022	Ademola Lookman	(Germany) RB Leipzig	Leicester City
31 August 2021	30 June 2022	Jovan Malcolm	West Bromwich Albion	Accrington Stanley
31 August 2021	1 January 2022	Max Melbourne	Lincoln City	Stevenage
31 August 2021	30 June 2022	George Miller	Barnsley	Walsall
31 August 2021	30 June 2022	Alex Mitchell	Millwall	Leyton Orient
31 August 2021	30 June 2022	(Mexico) Santiago Muñoz	(Mexico) Santos Laguna	Newcastle United
31 August 2021	30 June 2022	Josh Murphy	(Wales) Cardiff City	Preston North End
31 August 2021	30 June 2022	Richard Nartey	Burnley	Mansfield Town
31 August 2021	30 June 2022	Reiss Nelson	Arsenal	(Netherlands) Feyenoord
31 August 2021	30 June 2022	Christian Norton	Stoke City	Cheltenham Town
31 August 2021	30 June 2022	(France) Niels Nkounkou	Everton	(Belgium) Standard Liège
31 August 2021	30 June 2022	(Republic of Ireland) Lee O'Connor	(Scotland) Celtic	Tranmere Rovers
31 August 2021	30 June 2022	Sheyi Ojo	Liverpool	Millwall
31 August 2021	30 June 2022	Isaac Olaofe	Millwall	Sutton United
31 August 2021	30 June 2022	(Sweden) Robin Olsen	(Italy) Roma	Sheffield United
31 August 2021	30 June 2022	(Belgium) Dennis Praet	Leicester City	(Italy) Torino
31 August 2021	30 June 2022	Dominic Revan	Aston Villa	Northampton Town
31 August 2021	30 June 2022	Patrick Roberts	Manchester City	(France) Troyes
31 August 2021	30 June 2022	(Antigua and Barbuda) Mahlon Romeo	Millwall	Portsmouth
31 August 2021	30 June 2022	(Republic of Ireland) Connor Ronan	Wolverhampton Wanderers	(Scotland) St Mirren
31 August 2021	30 June 2022	(Iceland) Alex Rúnarsson	Arsenal	(Belgium) OH Leuven
31 August 2021	30 June 2022	(Netherlands) Philippe Sandler	Manchester City	(France) Troyes
31 August 2021	30 June 2022	(Spain) Saúl	(Spain) Atlético Madrid	Chelsea
31 August 2021	30 June 2022	(Senegal) Abdallah Sima	Brighton & Hove Albion	Stoke City
31 August 2021	30 June 2022	(Slovenia) Andraž Šporar	(Portugal) Sporting Lisbon	Middlesbrough
31 August 2021	30 June 2022	Dujon Sterling	Chelsea	Blackpool
31 August 2021	30 June 2022	Curtis Tilt	Rotherham United	Wigan Athletic
31 August 2021	30 June 2022	(Peru) Rodrigo Vilca	Newcastle United	Doncaster Rovers
31 August 2021	30 June 2022	Stephen Walker	Middlesbrough	Tranmere Rovers
31 August 2021	30 June 2022	Rhys Williams	Liverpool	(Wales) Swansea City
31 August 2021	30 June 2022	Harry Wood	Hull City	Scunthorpe United
31 August 2021	30 June 2022	Nathan Wood	Middlesbrough	(Scotland) Hibernian
31 August 2021	30 June 2022	(Cameroon) Andre-Frank Zambo Anguissa	Fulham	(Italy) Napoli
1 September 2021	30 June 2022	Owen Dale	Crewe Alexandra	Blackpool
1 September 2021	30 June 2022	(Portugal) Domingos Quina	Watford	Fulham
2 September 2021	30 June 2022	Tino Anjorin	Chelsea	(Russia) Lokomotiv Moscow
2 September 2021	30 June 2022	Josh Hawkes	Tranmere Rovers	Sunderland
2 September 2021	30 June 2022	(France) Rémy Vita	(Germany) Bayern Munich	Barnsley
