= 2022–23 Morecambe F.C. season =

Morecambe
2022–23 season
- Co-chairmen: Graham Howse & Rod Taylor
- Manager: Derek Adams
- Stadium: Mazuma Stadium
- League One: 22nd (relegated)
- FA Cup: First round
- EFL Cup: Third round
- EFL Trophy: Round of 32
- Top goalscorer: League: Cole Stockton (11); All: Cole Stockton (12)
- Highest home attendance: 5,769 v Lincoln City; 29 April 2023
- Lowest home attendance: 912 v Everton U23; 30 August 2022
- Average home league attendance: 4,572
- Biggest win: Morecambe 5–0 Burton Albion; 1 January 2023
- Biggest defeat: Derby County 5–0 Morecambe; 4 February 2023; Barnsley 5–0 Morecambe; 1 April 2023
- All statistics correct as of match played 7 May 2023.

The 2022–23 season is Morecambe's 99th season since formation, their 16th consecutive season in the Football League, and their second consecutive season in League One, the third tier of English football. They also competed in the FA Cup, EFL Cup and EFL Trophy.

== Transfers ==
=== In ===
Date	Pos	Player	Transferred from	Fee	Ref
1 July 2022 (Note: The transfer was announced on 20 June, and would become official on July 1, once his Salford City contract expired)	RB	(Scotland) Donald Love	(England) Salford City	Free Transfer	
1 July 2022 (Note: The transfer was announced on 17 June, and would become official on July 1, once his Lincoln City contract expired)	LB	(England) Max Melbourne	(England) Lincoln City	Free Transfer	
1 July 2022 (Note: The transfer was announced on 17 June, and would become official on July 1, once his Mansfield Town contract expired)	CB	(England) Farrend Rawson	(England) Mansfield Town	Free Transfer	
1 July 2022 (Note: The transfer was announced on 27 June, and would become official on July 1, once his Preston North End contract expired)	GK	(England) Connor Ripley	(England) Preston North End	Free Transfer	
8 July 2022	CM	(England) Jake Taylor	(England) Port Vale	Undisclosed	
12 July 2022	LW	(England) Ashley Hunter	(England) Salford City	Free Transfer	
9 August 2022	CB	(England) Jacob Bedeau	(England) Burnley	Undisclosed	
10 January 2023	AM	(England) Daniel Crowley	(Netherlands) Willem II	Undisclosed	
10 March 2023	CF	(Senegal) Oumar Niasse	Free agent	—N/a	
17 March 2023	LB	(Senegal) Pape Souare	Free agent	—N/a	

=== Out ===
Date	Pos	Player	Transferred to	Fee	Ref
30 June 2022 (Note: The transfer was announced on 1 June, and would become official on July 1, once his contract expired)	CF	(Kenya) Jonah Ayunga	(Scotland) St Mirren	Free Transfer	
30 June 2022	CB	(England) Rhys Bennett	(England) Rochdale	Released	
30 June 2022	DM	(France) Toumani Diagouraga	(England) Rochdale	Released	
30 June 2022	LB	(Jamaica) Greg Leigh	(England) Ipswich Town	Released	
30 June 2022	CB	(Ghana) Jacob Mensah	(England) Maidstone United	Released	
30 June 2022	LW	(England) Freddie Price	(England) Marine	Released	
30 June 2022	CM	(England) Aaron Wildig	(Wales) Newport County	Rejected Contract	
12 August 2022	RW	(England) Wes McDonald	(England) Hartlepool United	Mutual Consent	
12 August 2022	MF	(England) Connor Pye	(England) Sunderland	Undisclosed	
1 September 2022	RB	(Northern Ireland) Ryan McLaughlin	Unattached	Mutual Consent	
2 January 2023	DM	(France) Ousmane Fané	(Malaysia) Penang	Mutual Consent	
8 January 2023	RW	(Republic of Ireland) Dylan Connolly	(Republic of Ireland) Bohemian	Mutual Consent	
11 January 2023	CB	(Republic of Ireland) Anthony O'Connor	(England) Harrogate Town	Mutual Consent	
26 January 2023	RM	(Republic of Ireland) Shane McLoughlin	(England) Salford City	Mutual Consent	

=== Loans in ===
Date	Pos	Player	Loaned from	On loan until	Ref
23 June 2022	CM	(Australia) Caleb Watts	(England) Southampton	End of Season	
25 July 2022	DM	(England) Jensen Weir	(England) Brighton & Hove Albion	End of Season	
26 August 2022	FW	(England) Kieran Phillips	(England) Huddersfield Town	16 January 2023 (Note: On 16 January, Phillips' loan from Huddersfield was cut short due to an injury)	
1 September 2022	DM	(England) Liam Shaw	(Scotland) Celtic	End of Season	
5 January 2023	CB	(England) Dynel Simeu	(England) Southampton	End of Season	
19 January 2023	CF	(Scotland) Michael Mellon	(England) Burnley	End of Season	
31 January 2023	CM	(England) Josh Austerfield	(England) Huddersfield Town	End of Season	

=== Loans out ===
Date	Pos	Player	Loaned to	On loan until	Ref
2 September 2022	GK	(Portugal) Andre Da Silva Mendes	(England) Colne	31 December 2022 (Note: On 30 September, Mendes' loan at Colne was extended until end of December)	
7 January 2023	GK	(Portugal) Andre Da Silva Mendes	(England) Ashton United	End of Season (Note: On 3 February, Mendes' loan at Ashton was extended until the season ends)	
1 February 2023	CF	(England) Jonathan Obika	(Scotland) Motherwell	End of Season	

== Pre-season and friendlies ==
Morecambe announced four pre-season matches on 20 May 2022. Five days later, a home fixture against Middlesbrough was confirmed. On 13 June, a behind closed doors meeting with Huddersfield Town was added to the calendar.

Win Draw Loss Fixtures

5 July 2022 Friendly	Stalybridge Celtic	1–2	Morecambe	Stalybridge
19:45 BST	Grewel 21'	Report	Connolly 83' (pen.); Gnahoua 87'	Stadium: Bower Fold; Attendance: 369

9 July 2022 Friendly	Macclesfield	2–2	Morecambe	Macclesfield
15:00 BST	Kengni 4'; Curran 12'	Report	Stockton 47'; Hunter 70'	Stadium: Leasing.com Stadium; Attendance: 709; Referee: Tom Kirk

12 July 2022 Friendly	Huddersfield Town	3–1	Morecambe	Huddersfield
14:00 BST	Jackson 39', 44'; Rhodes 83'	Report	Obika 65'	Stadium: Canalside Sports Complex; Attendance: 0 (Behind-closed-doors)

16 July 2022 Friendly	Chester	1–1	Morecambe	Chester
15:00 BST	Weeks 56'	Report	Hunter 22'	Stadium: Deva Stadium; Attendance: 779; Referee: Peter Gibbons

19 July 2022 Friendly	Morecambe	0–3	Middlesbrough	Morecambe
19:00 BST		Report	Tavernier 14'; Crooks 28'; McGree 42'	Stadium: Mazuma Stadium; Attendance: 1,760

23 July 2022 Friendly	Morecambe	0–0	Carlisle United	Morecambe
15:00 BST		Report		Stadium: Mazuma Stadium; Attendance: 1,413

== Competitions ==
=== Overall record ===
Competition	First match	Last match	Starting round	Record							
Competition	First match	Last match	Starting round	Pld	W	D	L	GF	GA	GD	Win %
League One	August 2022	May 2023	Matchday 1	0	0	0	0	0	0	+0	—
FA Cup	TBC	TBC	First round	0	0	0	0	0	0	+0	—
EFL Cup	TBC	TBC	First round	0	0	0	0	0	0	+0	—
EFL Trophy	TBC	TBC	Group stage	0	0	0	0	0	0	+0	—
Total				0	0	0	0	0	0	+0	—

Last updated: pre-season
Source: [ Soccerway]

=== League One ===
==== League table ====
Pos	Team	Pld	W	D	L	GF	GA	GD	Pts	Promotion, qualification or relegation
19	Oxford United	46	11	14	21	49	56	−7	47	
20	Cambridge United	46	13	7	26	41	68	−27	46	
21	Milton Keynes Dons (R)	46	11	12	23	44	66	−22	45	Relegation to EFL League Two
22	Morecambe (R)	46	10	14	22	47	78	−31	44	Relegation to EFL League Two
23	Accrington Stanley (R)	46	11	11	24	40	77	−37	44	Relegation to EFL League Two
24	Forest Green Rovers (R)	46	6	9	31	31	89	−58	27	Relegation to EFL League Two

Source: EFL Official Website
Rules for classification: 1) Points; 2) Goal difference; 3) Number of goals scored; 4) Head-to-head results; 5) Wins; 6) Away goals; 7) Penalty points (sec 9.5); 8) 12-point sending off offences
(R) Relegated

==== Results summary ====
Overall								Home						Away					
Pld	W	D	L	GF	GA	GD	Pts	W	D	L	GF	GA	GD	W	D	L	GF	GA	GD
46	10	14	22	47	78	−31	44	8	8	7	30	31	−1	2	6	15	17	47	−30

Last updated: 7 May 2023.
Source: [ Soccerway]

==== Results by round ====
Round	1	2	3	4	5	6	7	8	9	10	11	12	13	14	15	16	17	18	19	20	21	22	23	24	25	26	27	28	29	30	31	32	33	34	35	36	37	38	39	40	41	42	43	44	45	46
Ground	H	A	H	A	A	H	A	H	A	H	A	H	A	H	A	A	H	H	A	H	A	A	H	H	H	A	H	A	H	A	H	H	A	H	A	A	H	H	A	A	H	A	H	A	H	A
Result	D	L	D	L	D	L	D	L	W	L	L	L	D	W	L	D	D	D	L	D	L	L	W	W	W	L	W	L	D	L	L	W	L	D	D	L	L	D	L	L	L	D	W	W	W	L
Position	16	21	21	22	23	23	22	23	23	23	24	24	24	23	24	23	22	22	23	24	24	24	24	22	19	21	19	21	21	21	23	20	20	21	21	21	22	22	22	22	23	23	22	21	21	22

Updated to match(es) played on 7 May 2023. Source: [ Soccerway]
A = Away; H = Home; W = Win; D = Draw; L = Loss

==== Matches ====
Win Draw Loss Fixtures

On 23 June, the league fixtures were announced.

30 July 2022 1	Morecambe	0–0	Shrewsbury Town	Morecambe
15:00 BST	Love (yellow card) 77'; Delaney (yellow card) 82'	Report	Bowman (yellow card) 63'; Flanagan (yellow card) 80'	Stadium: Mazuma Stadium; Attendance: 4,725; Referee: Marc Edwards

6 August 2022 2	Peterborough United	3–0	Morecambe	Peterborough
15:00 BST	Ward 9'; Thompson 43'; Marriott (yellow card) 64'; Kyprianou 72'	Report	Melbourne (yellow card) 42'	Stadium: Weston Homes Stadium; Attendance: 7,691; Referee: Dean Whitestone

13 August 2022 3	Morecambe	1–1	Fleetwood Town	Morecambe
15:00 BST	Gnahoua 32'; Love (yellow card) 49'; Hunter (yellow card) 69'	Report	Andrew (yellow card) 69', (goal) 83'; Lane (red card) 90+6'	Stadium: Mazuma Stadium; Attendance: 4,288; Referee: Seb Stockbridge

16 August 2022 4	Bolton Wanderers	1–0	Morecambe	Horwich
19:45 BST	Bradley 39', (yellow card) 90+5'	Report	Melbourne (yellow card) 23'	Stadium: University of Bolton Stadium; Attendance: 17,165; Referee: Anthony Backhouse

20 August 2022 5	Oxford United	1–1	Morecambe	Oxford
15:00 BST	Joseph 56'; Rodríguez (yellow card) 89'; Brown (yellow card) 90+7'	Report	Weir 48'; Stockton (yellow card) 51'; Fané (yellow card) 70'; Rawson (yellow card) 79'; Connolly (yellow card) 90+1'	Stadium: The Kassam Stadium; Attendance: 6,813; Referee: Ben Speedie

27 August 2022 6	Morecambe	0–4	Milton Keynes Dons	Morecambe
15:00 BST		Report	Grigg 16', 36'; Grant 62'; Dennis 67'	Stadium: Mazuma Stadium; Attendance: 3,995; Referee: Leigh Doughty

3 September 2022 7	Bristol Rovers	2–2	Morecambe	Horfield
15:00 BST	Loft 29'; Thomas 80', (yellow card) 90+1'; McCormick (yellow card) 90+5'	Report	Weir 12'; Gibson (yellow card) 16'; Phillips 53'	Stadium: Memorial Stadium; Attendance: 8,821; Referee: Dean Whitestone

10 September 2022	Morecambe	Postponed	Derby County	Morecambe
15:00 BST				Stadium: Mazuma Stadium
Note: Fixture was postponed as a mark of respect following the passing of Queen Elizabeth II.

13 September 2022 8	Morecambe	0–3	Sheffield Wednesday	Morecambe
19:45 BST		Report	McGuinness (yellow card) 38'; Windass 70'; Byers 78'; Smith 83'	Stadium: Mazuma Stadium; Attendance: 5,148; Referee: Andrew Kitchen

17 September 2022 9	Forest Green Rovers	1–2	Morecambe	Nailsworth
15:00 BST	O'Keeffe (yellow card) 27'; Wickham 30', (yellow card) 63'	Report	Phillips 44'; Cooney (yellow card) 52'; Rawson 90+3'	Stadium: The innocent New Lawn Stadium; Attendance: 2,601; Referee: Ollie Yates

24 September 2022 10	Morecambe	1–2	Cambridge United	Morecambe
15:00 BST	Weir 12', (yellow card) 37'	Report	Lankester 32'; Knibbs 87'	Stadium: Mazuma Stadium; Attendance: 3,917; Referee: Bobby Madden

1 October 2022 11	Accrington Stanley	3–1	Morecambe	Accrington
15:00 BST	Conneely (yellow card) 29'; Tharme (yellow card) 53'; Coyle 58'; Hamilton 81'; Leigh 85'	Report	Gibson (yellow card) 28'; Gnahoua (red card) 45+1'; Fané (yellow card) 61'; Astley 77' (o.g.); Rawson (yellow card) 82'; Love (yellow card) 88'	Stadium: Wham Stadium; Attendance: 2,916; Referee: James Oldham

8 October 2022 12	Morecambe	1–2	Ipswich Town	Morecambe
15:00 BST	Fané (yellow card) 23'; Delaney (yellow card) 32'; Phillips 34'; Bedeau (yellow card) 62'; Rawson (yellow card) 72'; Love (yellow card) 90+8'	Report	Edmundson 54'; Chaplin (penalty missed) 58'; Evans 65' (pen.) (yellow card) 71'	Stadium: Mazuma Stadium; Attendance: 4,776; Referee: Thomas Kirk

15 October 2022 13	Burton Albion	1–1	Morecambe	Burton upon Trent
15:00 BST	Keillor-Dunn 30'	Report	Connolly (yellow card) 23'; Shaw (yellow card) 25'; Delaney 77' (yellow card) 78'; Fané (yellow card) 79'; Rawson (yellow card) 90+1'	Stadium: Pirelli Stadium; Attendance: 2,602; Referee: Tom Reeves

22 October 2022 14	Morecambe	1–0	Barnsley	Morecambe
15:00 BST	Phillips 39'; Cooney (yellow card) 66'; Connolly (yellow card) 87'; Shaw (yellow card) 90+1'	Report	Cundy (yellow card) 55'; Edwards (yellow card) 90'	Stadium: Mazuma Stadium; Attendance: 5,270; Referee: Simon Mather

25 October 2022 15	Cheltenham Town	1–0	Morecambe	Cheltenham
19:45 BST	Williams 35'	Report	Connolly (yellow card) 60'; Rawson (yellow card) 62'; Fané (yellow card) 77'	Stadium: Whaddon Road Ground; Attendance: 3,515; Referee: Scott Oldham

29 October 2022 16	Wycombe Wanderers	1–1	Morecambe	High Wycombe
15:00 BST	Forino-Joseph 20'; Mawson (yellow card) 79'; Strykek (yellow card) 82'	Report	Weir (yellow card) 30'; Gibson (yellow card) 47'; Love (yellow card) 52'; Major 82'	Stadium: Adams Park; Attendance: 6,263; Referee: Alan Young

1 November 2022 17	Morecambe	1–1	Derby County	Morecambe
19:45 GMT	Weir 45+2'; Watts (yellow card) 53'; Ripley (yellow card) 81'	Report	Collins (penalty missed) 38'; McGoldrick (yellow card) 41' (penalty missed) 48'; Sibley 59'; Cashin (yellow card) 81'	Stadium: Mazuma Stadium; Attendance: 5,157; Referee: Marc Edwards

12 November 2022 18	Morecambe	1–1	Portsmouth	Morecambe
15:00 GMT	Shaw 36' (yellow card) 90+6'; Love (yellow card) 72'; Connolly (yellow card) 90+4'	Report	Pack (yellow card) 15'; Bishop 67'; Mingi (yellow card) 90+6'; Hume (yellow card) 90+7'	Stadium: Mazuma Stadium; Attendance: 4,726; Referee: Adam Herczeg

19 November 2022 19	Lincoln City	2–1	Morecambe	Lincoln
15:00 BST	Walsh 17'; House 67'; Oakley-Boothe (yellow card) 83'; Robson (yellow card) 86'; Sørensen (yellow card) 90+2'; Hopper (yellow card) 90+4'	Report	Weir 81', (yellow card) 89'	Stadium: LNER Stadium; Attendance: 8,325; Referee: Martin Coy

2 December 2022 20	Morecambe	1–1	Exeter City	Morecambe
19:45 GMT	O'Connor (yellow card) 25'; Stockton 34'; Gibson (yellow card) 68'	Report	Key 36'	Stadium: Mazuma Stadium; Attendance: 3,976; Referee: Peter Wright

10 December 2022	Morecambe	Postponed	Charlton Athletic	Morecambe
15:00 GMT				Stadium: Mazuma Stadium
Note: Fixture was postponed due to a frozen pitch.

17 December 2022 21	Plymouth Argyle	2–1	Morecambe	Plymouth
15:00 GMT	Whittaker (penalty missed) 43'; Ennis 69'; Cosgrove 84'	Report	Shaw (yellow card) 30'; O'Connor 90+1'	Stadium: Home Park; Attendance: 14,368; Referee: Tom Reeves

26 December 2022 22	Port Vale	1–0	Morecambe	Burslem
15:00 GMT	Conlon (yellow card) 32'; Massey 40'; Benning (yellow card) 76'	Report	Melbourne (yellow card) 68'; Love (yellow card) 85' (yellow-red card) 90+7'; Rawson (yellow card) 86'; Gibson (yellow card) 90+4'	Stadium: Vale Park; Attendance: 7,867; Referee: Simon Mather

29 December 2022 23	Morecambe	2–0	Accrington Stanley	Morecambe
19:45 GMT	Shaw 34'; Weir 43'; Bedeau (yellow card) 65'	Report	Pritchard (yellow card) 57'; Rodgers (yellow card) 90+4'	Stadium: The Mazuma Stadium; Attendance: 4,191; Referee: Seb Stockbridge

1 January 2023 24	Morecambe	5–0	Burton Albion	Morecambe
15:00 GMT	Phillips 32', 55'; Weir 45+1'; Watts 51', (yellow card) 66', (goal) 83'	Report	Taylor (yellow card) 75'	Stadium: The Mazuma Stadium; Attendance: 3,972; Referee: Anthony Backhouse

7 January 2023 25	Morecambe	2–1	Cheltenham Town	Morecambe
15:00 GMT	Weir 20'; Phillips 47'; Cooney (yellow card) 87'; Mayor (yellow card) 90+3'	Report	May 39'; Taylor (yellow card) 80'	Stadium: The Mazuma Stadium; Attendance: 4,677; Referee: Martin Woods

14 January 2023	Cambridge United	Postponed	Morecambe	Cambridge
15:00 GMT				Stadium: Abbey Stadium
Note: Fixture was postponed due to severe winds causing extensive damage to the roof structure.

21 January 2023	Morecambe	Postponed	Port Vale	Morecambe
15:00 GMT				Stadium: The Mazuma Stadium
Note: Fixture was postponed due to a frozen pitch.

24 January 2023 26	Ipswich Town	4–0	Morecambe	Ipswich
19:45 GMT	Ladapo 1', 16'; Chaplin 38', 45+6', (yellow card) 70'	Report	Bedeau (yellow card) 49'; Crowley (yellow card) 70'	Stadium: Portman Road; Attendance: 21,948; Referee: David Rock

28 January 2023 27	Morecambe	5–1	Bristol Rovers	Morecambe
15:00 GMT	Crowley 20'; Gibson (yellow card) 45+2'; Connolly 47' (o.g.); Love 49'; Stockton 62'; Mayor 88'; Mayor (yellow card) 90+5'	Report	Connolly (yellow card) 42'; Collins 90'; McCormick (yellow card) 90+3'	Stadium: The Mazuma Stadium; Attendance: 4,259; Referee: Will Finnie

4 February 2023 28	Derby County	5–0	Morecambe	Derby
15:00 GMT	McGoldrick 45', 47', 50' (pen.); Collins 66' (pen.); Knight 69'	Report	Gibson (yellow card) 25'; Simeu (yellow card) 44'; Austerfield (yellow card) 87'; Love (yellow card) 90+5'	Stadium: Pride Park Stadium; Attendance: 26,035; Referee: Craig Hicks

11 February 2023 29	Morecambe	1–1	Forest Green Rovers	Morecambe
15:00 GMT	Stockton 89'	Report	Omotoye (yellow card) 79'; Clarke 81'; Peart-Harris (yellow card) 88'	Stadium: The Mazuma Stadium; Attendance: 4,563; Referee: Martin Coy

14 February 2023 30	Sheffield Wednesday	3–0	Morecambe	Owlerton
19:45 GMT	Bannan 1', (yellow card) 36'; Windass 22', 87'	Report	Simeu (yellow card) 10'; Gibson (yellow card) 64'	Stadium: Hillsborough Stadium; Attendance: 21,330; Referee: Robert Lewis

18 February 2023 31	Morecambe	0–3	Peterborough United	Morecambe
15:00 GMT	Bedeau (yellow card) 52'	Report	Taylor 12'; Ward 22'; Poku 29'; Kyprianou (yellow card) 43'	Stadium: Globe Arena; Attendance: 4,172 (458 away); Referee: Darren Handley

21 February 2023 32	Morecambe	1–0	Port Vale	Morecambe
19:45 GMT	Mayor 51'; Bedeau (yellow card) 60'	Report	Robinson (yellow card) 90+3'	Stadium: The Mazuma Stadium; Attendance: 4,360 (857 away); Referee: Ross Joyce

25 February 2023 33	Fleetwood Town	1–0	Morecambe	Fleetwood
15:00 GMT	Mendes Gomes 13'; Andrew (yellow card) 80'; Hayes (yellow card) 88'	Report	Shaw (yellow card) 42'; Love (yellow card) 71'; Weir (yellow card) 82'	Stadium: Highbury Stadium; Attendance: 4,550; Referee: Andy Davies

5 March 2023 34	Morecambe	0–0	Bolton Wanderers	Morecambe
12:30 GMT	Shaw (yellow card) 65'	Report		Stadium: The Mazuma Stadium; Attendance: 5,211 (1,626 away); Referee: Oliver Langford

7 March 2023 35	Cambridge United	1–1	Morecambe	Cambridge
19:45 GMT	Lankester 14'; McGrandles (yellow card) 35'; Jones (yellow card) 76'	Report	Stockton 45+2'	Stadium: Abbey Stadium; Attendance: 5,225 (122 away); Referee: Paul Howard

11 March 2023 36	Shrewsbury Town	3–1	Morecambe	Shrewsbury
15:00 GMT	Moore (yellow card) 21'; Leahy 33' (pen.), (yellow card) 65'; Street 44'; Bayliss (yellow card) 62'; Dunkley 84'	Report	Crowley 45+1'	Stadium: Montgomery Waters Meadow; Attendance: 5,225 (122 away); Referee: Rebecca Welch

14 March 2023 37	Morecambe	1–4	Charlton Athletic	Morecambe
19:45 GMT	Weir (yellow card) 51'; Love 61'	Report	Leaburn 17'; Blackett-Taylor 21', 43'; Thomas (yellow card) 24'; Fraser 69'; Morgan (yellow card) 74'	Stadium: The Mazuma Stadium; Attendance: 3,795; Referee: Andy Haines

18 March 2023 38	Morecambe	1–1	Oxford United	Morecambe
15:00 GMT	Mayor (yellow card) 4'; Simeu (yellow card) 67'; Crowley (yellow card) 83'; Hunter 87'	Report	Browne 41', (yellow card) 45+2'	Stadium: The Mazuma Stadium; Attendance: 4,260; Referee: Sam Barrott

25 March 2023 39	Milton Keynes Dons	1–0	Morecambe	Denbigh
15:00 GMT	Leko 57'; Maghoma (yellow card) 74'	Report	Simeu (yellow card) 40'; Bedeau (yellow card) 79'; Watts (yellow card) 90'	Stadium: Stadium MK; Attendance: 6,758 (206 away); Referee: Thomas Parsons

1 April 2023 40	Barnsley	5–0	Morecambe	Barnsley
15:00 BST	Cole 4', 43'; Simeu 21' (o.g.); Kane 32'; Kitching (yellow card) 39'; Thomas 90+3'	Report		Stadium: Oakwell Stadium; Attendance: 11,519 (279 away); Referee: Seb Stockbridge

7 April 2023 41	Morecambe	1–3	Plymouth Argyle	Morecambe
15:00 BST	Weir 3'; Rawson (yellow card) 30'; Austerfield (yellow card) 74'	Report	Edwards (yellow card) 59'; Mayor 63'; Waine 86'; Matete 90+3', (yellow card) 90+4'	Stadium: The Mazuma Stadium; Attendance: 4,904; Referee: Marc Edwards

10 April 2023 42	Portsmouth	0–0	Morecambe	Milton, Portsmouth
15:00 BST	Dale (yellow card) 90'; Bishop (yellow card) 90+3'	Report	Austerfield (yellow card) 42'; Rawson (yellow card) 59'	Stadium: Fratton Park; Attendance: 17,739 (139 away); Referee: Ollie Yates

15 April 2023 43	Morecambe	1–0	Wycombe Wanderers	Morecambe
15:00 BST	Cooney (yellow card) 61'; Crowley (yellow card) 80'; Stockton 89', (yellow card) 90'	Report	Forino-Joseph (yellow card) 69'; Thompson (yellow card) 86'	Stadium: The Mazuma Stadium; Attendance: 5,040 (234 away); Referee: Andrew Kitchen

22 April 2023 44	Charlton Athletic	2–3	Morecambe	Charlton
15:00 BST	Leaburn (yellow card) 33'; Rak-Sakyi 45+1'; Fraser 79'	Report	Stockton 8', 57'; Weir 64'	Stadium: The Valley; Attendance: 13,347 (220 away); Referee: David Rock

29 April 2023 45	Morecambe	3–2	Lincoln City	Morecambe
15:00 BST	Crowley (yellow card) 45+1'; Stockton 50', (yellow card) 68', (goal) 86'; Niasse 66'; Austerfield (yellow card) 82'; Derek Adams (yellow card) off the pitch'	Report	Sørensen 30'; Virtue (yellow card) 34', (goal) 48'; Erhahon (yellow card) 74'; Poole (yellow card) 85'	Stadium: The Mazuma Stadium; Attendance: 5,759; Referee: Sam Allison

7 May 2023 46	Exeter City	3–2	Morecambe	Exeter
12:00 BST	Stansfield 49', 57', 70'; Borges (yellow card) 72'; Sweeney (yellow card) 77'; Kite (yellow card) 83'; Caprice (yellow card) 90+5'	Report	Stockton 53', 90+14'; Weir (yellow card) 79'; Mayor (yellow card) 81'; Hunter (yellow card) 90+6'	Stadium: St James Park; Attendance: 7,386 (658 away); Referee: Carl Brook

=== FA Cup ===
The Shrimps were drawn away to Sheffield Wednesday in the first round.

Win Draw Loss Fixtures

4 November 2022 First round	Sheffield Wednesday	2–0	Morecambe	Owlerton
19:45 BST	Windass 29'; Mighten 65'; Johnson (yellow card) 90'	Report	Weir (yellow card) 32'	Stadium: Hillsborough; Attendance: 8,558; Referee: Sunny Gill

=== EFL Cup ===
Win Draw Loss Fixtures

Morecambe were drawn at home to Stoke City in the first round and away to Rotherham United in the second round.

9 August 2022 First round	Morecambe	0–0 (5–3 p)	Stoke City	Morecambe
19:45 BST	Weir (yellow card) 61' (yellow-red card) 62'; Gibson (yellow card) 73'; Ousmane (yellow card) 83'	Report		Stadium: Mazuma Stadium; Attendance: 2,806; Referee: Andy Haines
	Penalties
	Connolly (penalty scored); Obika (penalty scored); Watts (penalty scored); Love (penalty scored); McLoughlin (penalty scored)		Fox (penalty missed); Smallbone (penalty scored); Clucas (penalty scored); Thompson (penalty scored)

23 August 2022 Second round	Rotherham United	0–1	Morecambe	Rotherham
19:45 BST		Report	Gnahoua 72'	Stadium: New York Stadium; Attendance: 3,808; Referee: Peter Wright

8 November 2022 Third round	Milton Keynes Dons	2–0	Morecambe	Denbigh
19:45 GMT	O'Hora 18'; Eisa (yellow card) 22'; Dennis 51'	Report	Watts (yellow card) 35'; Gibson (yellow card) 83'	Stadium: Stadium:mk; Attendance: 1,674; Referee: Ben Toner

=== EFL Trophy ===
On 20 June, the initial Group stage draw was made, grouping Morecambe with Harrogate Town and Hartlepool United. Three days later, Everton U21s joined Northern Group A. In the second round, Morecambe were drawn away to Lincoln City.

Pos	Div	Team	Pld	W	PW	PL	L	GF	GA	GD	Pts	Qualification
1	ACA	Everton U21	3	1	1	1	0	10	4	+6	6	Advance to Round 2
2	L1	Morecambe	3	0	2	0	1	4	5	−1	4	Advance to Round 2
3	L2	Harrogate Town	3	1	0	1	1	3	4	−1	4	
4	L2	Hartlepool United	3	1	0	1	1	2	6	−4	4	

Source: EFL.com

Win Draw Loss Fixtures

30 August 2022 Group stage	Morecambe	3–3 (7–6 p)	Everton U21s	Morecambe
19:00 BST	Weir 17'; O'Connor (yellow card) 24'; Watts 34', (yellow card) 54'; Love (yellow card) 70'; Rawson 84'	Report	McAllister 32'; Price (yellow card) 45+1', (goal) 48'; Cannon 57'; John (yellow card) 90+2'	Stadium: Mazuma Stadium; Attendance: 912; Referee: Rebecca Welch
	Penalties
	Watts (penalty scored); Phillips (penalty scored); Cooney (penalty scored); Love (penalty scored); Connolly (penalty missed); Major (penalty scored); McLoughlin (penalty scored); O'Connor (penalty scored)		Cannon (penalty scored); Okoronkwo (penalty scored); Anderson (penalty scored); Hunt (penalty missed); Warrington (penalty scored); Price (penalty scored); Kouyate (penalty scored); Campbell (penalty missed)

20 September 2022 Group stage	Morecambe	0–0 (4–2 p)	Hartlepool United	Morecambe
19:00 BST	Fané (yellow card) 74'; Love (yellow card) 90+4'	Report		Stadium: Mazuma Stadium; Attendance: 934; Referee: Martin Woods
	Penalties
	Weir (penalty scored); Stockton (penalty scored); Cooney (penalty scored); Love (penalty scored)		Murray (penalty missed); Ferguson (penalty missed); Shelton (penalty scored); Crawford (penalty scored)

18 October 2022 Group stage	Harrogate Town	2–1	Morecambe	Harrogate
19:00 BST	O'Boyle 28'; Welch-Hayes 90+6'	Report	Major 2'; Smith (yellow card) 53'	Stadium: The EnviroVent Stadium; Attendance: 717; Referee: Darren Drysdale

22 November 2022 Second round	Lincoln City	1–1 (4–3 p)	Morecambe	Lincoln
19:00 GMT	Hopper 53'; Bishop (yellow card) 63'		Love (yellow card) 55'; Stockton 67'	Stadium: LNER Stadium; Attendance: 1,445; Referee: Carl Boyeson
	Penalties
	Diamond (penalty scored); Bishop (penalty scored); Sanders (penalty scored); Poole (penalty scored)		Weir (penalty scored); Stockton (penalty scored); Cooney (penalty scored); Love (penalty missed); Shaw (penalty missed)
