= Braintree Town F.C. =

Association football club in Braintree, England

Braintree Town
- Full name: Braintree Town Football Club
- Nickname: The Iron
- Founded: 24 September 1898
- Ground: Cressing Road, Braintree
- Capacity: 4,222 (553 seated)
- Chairman: Lee Harding
- Manager: Steve Pitt
- League: National League South
- 2025–26: National League, 23rd of 24 (relegated)
- Website: braintreetownfc.org.uk
Home colours	Away colours

Braintree Town Football Club is a professional football club based in Braintree, Essex, England. They are currently members of the National League South, the sixth tier of English football, and play at Cressing Road.

== History ==
The club was formed on 24 September 1898 as Manor Works, the works team of the Crittall Window Company, from which they gained their nickname Iron. The new club took over the fixtures of the recently defunct Braintree F.C. in the North Essex League, and also took on most of the former club's players. They left the league in 1900, but returned in 1901. They won the title in 1905–06, 1910–11 and 1911–12, also winning the Mid-Essex League in 1909–10 and 1910–11. In 1911 they also joined Division 2A of the Essex & Suffolk Border League, remaining in the league until 1928.

In 1921 they were renamed Crittall Athletic to be more closely identified with their parent company. After winning Division Two (Western) in 1922–23 and 1923–24, they were promoted to the Senior Division of the Border League in 1925. In 1928 they joined the Spartan League, and in 1935 were founder members of the Eastern Counties League, although they also continued to play in the Border League. They won the Border League in 1935–36 and both the Border League and the Eastern Counties League in 1936–37, but then left the Eastern Counties League to join the newly established Essex County League. The new league folded after a single season (in which Crittall were runners-up) and the club returned to the Eastern Counties League.

After World War II the Eastern Counties League did not resume in 1945, so Crittall joined the Eastern Division of the London League instead. After finishing second in their first season, they were promoted to the Premier Division. They were invited to rejoin the Eastern Counties League in 1947, but turned the offer down and remained in the London League, where they won the League Cup twice before returning to the Eastern Counties League in 1952. In 1954 they turned professional, but financial problems forced them to revert to amateur status and drop back down into the Border League at the end of the 1954–55 season.

In 1959–60 they won the league and League Cup double. They switched to the Greater London League in 1964, and then to the Metropolitan League in 1966. They were renamed Braintree & Crittall Athletic in 1968, and after winning the League Cup in 1969–70, the club returned to the Eastern Counties League again. In 1981 all links with Crittall were severed and the club was renamed Braintree F.C., before adopting their current name a year later. They won their second Eastern Counties League title in 1983–84 and retained it the following season. In 1986–87 they won the Essex Senior Trophy and the following season they won the League Cup.

In 1991 Braintree moved up to the Southern Division of the Southern League. In 1996 the club asked the FA to switch leagues to reduce their travelling. After initially being refused, they were allowed to move to Division Three of the Isthmian League, although it was an effective drop of two divisions. They were promoted as runners-up in their first season, and repeated the feat the following season. After three seasons in Division One they were promoted to the Premier Division with a third-place finish in 2000–01. They won the Premier Division in 2005–06 to earn promotion to the Conference South. The season also saw them reach the first round of the FA Cup for the first time, eventually losing 4–1 at Shrewsbury Town.

Braintree qualified for the promotion play-offs in their first season in the Conference South, but lost 1–0 to Salisbury City in the final. They also reached the play-offs the following season, but lost to Eastbourne Borough in the semi-finals. In 2010–11 they finished as Conference South champions, earning promotion to the Conference Premier. The next four seasons saw the club reach the FA Cup for the first round, losing to Tranmere Rovers, Newport County, Chesterfield and Oxford United in successive seasons. In 2015–16 they finished third in the renamed National League, qualifying for the promotion play-offs. Despite winning the first leg at Grimsby Town 1–0, they lost the home leg 2–0 after extra time. In 2016–17 the club reached the second round of the FA Cup for the first time after beating Eastbourne Borough in the first round; they eventually lost 5–2 to Millwall in the second round. They were relegated from the National League at the end of the season after finishing in the bottom four.

The 2017–18 season saw Braintree finish sixth in the National League South. In the play-offs they defeated Hemel Hempstead Town and Dartford to reach the final, in which they beat Hampton & Richmond Borough 4–3 on penalties to earn promotion back to the National League. However, they were relegated to the National League South the following season after finishing second-from-bottom of the National League. In 2022–23 the club won the Essex Senior Cup, beating Concord Rangers 2–0 in the final. The following season saw them finish fifth in the National League South. In the subsequent play-offs they defeated Bath City 1–0 in the quarter-finals and Chelmsford City 3–2 in the semi-finals before beating Worthing 4–3 in the final to earn another promotion back to the National League. However, they finished second-from-bottom of the National League in 2025–26 and were relegated back to the National League South.

=== Reserve team ===
Braintree Town reserves joined Division One of the Eastern Counties League in 2012, remaining in the league until the end of the 2018–19 season.

== Ground ==
After being founded, Manor Works initially played at the Fair Field, now the site of the town hall, library and bus station. They moved to Spaldings Meadow in Panfield Lane in 1903. In 1923, the club moved to a new ground on Cressing Road which had been built by their parent company. Due to problems with the pitch in 1975, the club were forced to play matches at several other venues, including Heybridge Swifts' Scraley Road (a single match on 26 April arranged at such short notice that many fans arrived at Cressing Road for the match and only 50 attended the game), Braintree Rugby Club's Tabor Avenue (at the start of the 1975–76 season) and the Courtaulds Sports Ground in Church Street in Bocking (a single match against Gorleston on 6 September 1975 with a crowd of 73).

== Current squad ==
As of 12 November 2026

Note: Flags indicate national team as defined under FIFA eligibility rules; some limited exceptions apply. Players may hold more than one non-FIFA nationality.

No.	Pos.	Nation	Player
1	GK	WAL	Ben Hughes (on loan from Cambridge United)
2	DF	ENG	Idreess Namisi
3	DF	ENG	Ryan Clampin (player-coach)
4	MF	ENG	Reuben Swann
5	DF	ENG	Jacob Mensah (vice-captain)
6	DF	ENG	Michael Olarewaju
7	MF	ENG	Courtney Senior
8	MF	ENG	Louie Johnson
9	FW	ENG	Saleem Akanbi
10	FW	ENG	Alfie Matthews (vice-captain)
11	MF	ENG	Fletcher Hubbard

No.	Pos.	Nation	Player
12	MF	ENG	Zac Hambury (on loan from Leyton Orient)
15	MF	ROU	Alex Bolovan
16	MF	ENG	Alfie Lewis
17	MF	FRA	Amine Sassi
18	DF	ENG	Luis Brown (on loan from West Ham United)
19	DF	WAL	Ben Isaacson
20	DF	ENG	Jet Dyer (on loan from Dagenham & Redbridge)
21	FW	IRL	Afi Adebayo
39	MF	WAL	Elliot Thorpe (captain)
—	DF	ENG	Fin Adams (dual-registered with Stanway Rovers)
—	DF	ENG	Jacob Goredema (dual-registered with AFC Sudbury)

== Management team ==
Position	Staff
Manager	Steve Pitt
Assistant Manager	Tom Austin
First Team Coach	Phil Coleman
Goalkeeping Coach	Stefan Robson
Head of Analysis	Michael Pulford
Head of Medical	Kotryna Stoknaite
Strength & Conditioning Coach	Cullen Bacon
Head of Medical	Frankie Sullivan
Kit Man & Logistics	Bastian Miller

Source: Braintree Town F.C.

== Honours ==
- National League
  - National League South champions 2010–11
- Isthmian League
  - Premier Division champions 2005–06
- Metropolitan League
  - League Cup winners 1969–70
- Eastern Counties League
  - Champions 1936–37, 1983–84, 1984–85
  - League Cup winners 1987–88
- London League
  - League Cup winners 1948–49, 1951–52
- Essex & Suffolk Border League
  - Champions 1935–36, 1936–37, 1937–38, 1959–60
  - League Cup winners 1959–60
  - Division Two (Western) champions 1922–23, 1923–24
- North Essex League
  - Champions 1905–06, 1910–11, 1911–12
- Mid-Essex League
  - Champions 1909–10, 1910–11
- Essex Senior Cup
  - Winners 1995–96, 2022–23
- Essex Senior Trophy
  - Winners 1986–87

== Records ==
- Best FA Cup performance: Second round, 2016–17
- Best FA Trophy performance: Fifth round, 2001–02
- Best FA Vase performance: Fifth round, 1984–85, 1987–88
- Biggest victory: 12–0 vs Thetford, Eastern Counties League, 1935–36
- Heaviest defeat: 14–0 vs Chelmsford, North Essex League, 1923
- Record attendance: 4,500 vs Barking, Essex Senior Cup, 1935–36; 4,000 vs Tottenham Hotspur, testimonial match, May 1952
- Most appearances: Brad Quinton, 546
- Most goals: Chris Guy, 211 (1983–1990)
  - Most goals in a season: Gary Bennett, 57 (1997–98)
- Record transfer fee received: £40,000 from Barnet for Simeon Akinola

== See also ==
- Braintree Town F.C. players
- Braintree Town F.C. managers
