= Andre Da Silva Mendes =

Brazilian footballer (born 2003)

Personal information
- Full name: André Filipe da Silva Mendes
- Date of birth: 15 May 2003 (age 23)
- Place of birth: Paraná, Brazil
- Position: Goalkeeper

Team information
- Current team: Northwich Victoria

Youth career
- 2015–2015: Marinhense
- 2016–2019: Benfica
- 2019–2021: Morecambe

Senior career*
| Years | Team | Apps | (Gls) |
| 2021–2023 | Morecambe | 0 | (0) |
| 2022 | → Colne (loan) | 12 | (0) |
| 2023 | → Ashton United (loan) | 0 | (0) |
| 2023- | Lancaster City | 0 | (0) |
- * Club domestic league appearances and goals as of 19:29, 12 July 2023 (UTC)

André Filipe da Silva Mendes (born 15 May 2003) is a Brazilian professional footballer who plays as a goalkeeper for Northwich Victoria.

== Early life ==
André Filipe da Silva Mendes was born in Paraná, Brazil and moved to Leiria, Portugal at the age of six.

== Career ==
Mendes spent two years with the Benfica academy as a 13-year-old, before moving to England. He joined the academy at Morecambe in December 2019. He achieved his Level Two coaching award in early 2021. He fractured the scaphoid bone in his hand in a training ground injury sustained towards the end of the 2020–21 season and was ruled out until the end of October. He signed his first professional contract in May 2021. He made his first-team debut on 9 November 2021, when he was named as man of the match during a 2–0 defeat to Carlisle United in an EFL Trophy game at the Globe Arena; he had been called into the team following an injury sustained by Kyle Letheren in the warm-up. Manager Stephen Robinson said that "Barry Roche has high hopes for him and he proved that on the night".

On 2 September 2022, he joined Northern Premier League Division One West club Colne on a one-month loan deal. The loan was later extended until the end of the calendar year.

On 7 January 2023, he joined Northern Premier League side Ashton United on a 28-day loan deal.

On 8 May 2023, it was confirmed he would not be offered a new deal at Morecambe FC and will leave the club in May 2023.

== Career statistics ==
As of match played 6 December 2022

Appearances and goals by club, season and competition
| Club | Season | League | | | FA Cup | | EFL Cup | | Other | | Total | |
| Club | Season | Division | Apps | Goals | Apps | Goals | Apps | Goals | Apps | Goals | Apps | Goals |
|---|---|---|---|---|---|---|---|---|---|---|---|---|
| Morecambe | 2021–22 | EFL League One | 0 | 0 | 0 | 0 | 0 | 0 | 1 (Note: Appearance in EFL Trophy) | 0 | 1 | 0 |
| Morecambe | 2022–23 | EFL League One | 0 | 0 | 0 | 0 | 0 | 0 | 0 | 0 | 0 | 0 |
| Morecambe | Total | | 0 | 0 | 0 | 0 | 0 | 0 | 1 | 0 | 1 | 0 |
| Colne (loan) | 2022–23 | Northern Premier League. Division One West | 12 | 0 | 0 | 0 | 0 | 0 | 5 | 0 | 17 | 0 |
| Career total | | | 12 | 0 | 0 | 0 | 0 | 0 | 6 | 0 | 18 | 0 |
