= Max Melbourne =

English footballer (born 1998)

Personal information
- Full name: Max Melbourne
- Date of birth: 24 October 1998 (age 28)
- Height: 6 ft 0 in (1.83 m)
- Position: Left back

Team information
- Current team: Penybont
- Number: 3

Youth career
- 2008–2017: West Bromwich Albion

Senior career*
Years	Team	Apps	(Gls)
2017–2020	West Bromwich Albion	0	(0)
2018	→ Ross County (loan)	6	(0)
2018	→ Partick Thistle (loan)	3	(0)
2019–2020	→ Lincoln City (loan)	2	(0)
2020–2022	Lincoln City	21	(1)
2021	→ Walsall (loan)	20	(1)
2021–2022	→ Stevenage (loan)	7	(0)
2022–2024	Morecambe	31	(0)
2025–2026	Gateshead	14	(0)
2026–	Penybont	12	(1)
- * Club domestic league appearances and goals as of 08:05, 8 November 2026 (UTC)

Max Melbourne (born 24 October 1998) is an English professional footballer who plays as a left back for Penybont.

== Career ==
Melbourne joined West Bromwich Albion at the age of 9. He moved on loan to Ross County in January 2018, making his senior debut on 10 March 2018. Melbourne subsequently joined Partick Thistle on a six-month loan in July 2018. Melbourne scored his first Thistle goal in a 5–0 away win against Stranraer in the Scottish Challenge Cup. His loan deal ended early, in November 2018, having scored one goal in five games. On 2 September 2019 he signed a loan deal at Lincoln City lasting until 6 January 2020.

Melbourne's deal at Lincoln was made a 2 1/2-year permanent contract on 10 January 2020.

On 1 February 2021, he joined Walsall on loan for the remainder of the 2020–21 season. He scored on his debut for the club, at home to Mansfield Town on 9 February 2021.

He returned to the Lincoln City team the following season, starting the season opening against Gillingham. On 31 August 2021 he joined Stevenage on loan until January. He was recalled by Lincoln City on 10 January 2022. He scored his first goal for Lincoln on 22 January 2022, an injury time header against Plymouth Argyle. In May 2022 it was announced that he would leave the club at the end of the season, and in June 2022 it was announced that he would sign for Morecambe on 1 July. He was released by Morecambe at the end of the 2023–24 season.

He returned to football in August 2025, signing with Gateshead. In June 2026 he signed for Penybont.

== Career statistics ==
As of 29 April 2023

Appearances and goals by club, season and competition
Club	Season	League			National Cup		League Cup		Other		Total	
Club	Season	Division	Apps	Goals	Apps	Goals	Apps	Goals	Apps	Goals	Apps	Goals
West Bromwich Albion	2017–18	Premier League	0	0	0	0	0	0	0	0	0	0
West Bromwich Albion	2018–19	Championship	0	0	0	0	0	0	0	0	0	0
West Bromwich Albion	Total		0	0	0	0	0	0	0	0	0	0
Ross County (loan)	2017–18	Scottish Premiership	6	0	0	0	0	0	0	0	6	0
Partick Thistle (loan)	2018–19	Scottish Championship	3	0	0	0	1	0	1 (Note: Appearance in the Scottish Challenge Cup.)	1	5	1
Lincoln City (loan)	2019–20	League One	2	0	0	0	0	0	3 (Note: Appearances in EFL Trophy.)	0	5	0
Lincoln City	2019–20	League One	6	0	0	0	0	0	0	0	6	0
Lincoln City	2020–21	League One	8	0	2	0	2	0	4	0	16	0
Lincoln City	2021–22	League One	7	1	0	0	1	0	0	0	8	1
Lincoln City	Total		21	1	2	0	3	0	4	0	30	1
Walsall (loan)	2020–21	League Two	20	1	0	0	0	0	0	0	20	1
Stevenage (loan)	2021–22	League Two	7	0	3	0	0	0	3	0	13	0
Morecambe	2022–23	League One	15	0	0	0	1	0	1	0	17	0
Career total			74	2	5	0	5	0	12	1	96	3
