= Liam Shaw =

English footballer (born 2001)

Personal information
- Full name: Liam Darren Shaw
- Date of birth: 12 March 2001 (age 25)
- Place of birth: Sheffield, England
- Height: 1.90 m (6 ft 3 in)
- Position: Defensive midfielder

Team information
- Current team: Northampton Town
- Number: 29

Youth career
- 2010–2018: Sheffield Wednesday

Senior career*
Years	Team	Apps	(Gls)
2018–2021	Sheffield Wednesday	21	(1)
2019	→ Chesterfield (loan)	4	(0)
2021–2024	Celtic	1	(0)
2022	→ Motherwell (loan)	7	(0)
2022–2023	→ Morecambe (loan)	34	(2)
2023–2024	→ Wigan Athletic (loan)	20	(0)
2024–2025	Fleetwood Town	11	(0)
2025–	Northampton Town	8	(2)
- * Club domestic league appearances and goals as of 09:10, 26 February 2025 (UTC)

Liam Darren Shaw (born 12 March 2001) is an English professional footballer who plays as a defensive midfielder for EFL League Two club Northampton Town.

== Career ==
=== Sheffield Wednesday ===
Liam Shaw was born in Sheffield, joining Sheffield Wednesday at the age of eight and worked his way up through the club. He would sign his first professional contract on the 21 December 2018, signing a contract until the summer of 2021.

He went out on loan on the 21 November 2019 to National League side Chesterfield for one month, where he would play 5 games in total for The Spireites.

Later that season, he would make his professional debut for Sheffield Wednesday against Queens Park Rangers on the 11 July 2020. and play one other game against Middlesbrough on the final game of the 2019–20 season. During the 2020–21 season, he would become more of a first team regular which would see him score his first professional goal against Middlesbrough on the 29 December 2020, as well as being shown a straight red card against Reading on the 3 December 2020. His form would see him linked with a move to Scottish Premiership side Celtic. In February 2021 it was reported that Shaw had signed a pre-contract agreement with Celtic, with a £300,000 compensation fee mooted. But he would remain with the Sheffield Wednesday first team, and a few days later would be sent off for the second time that season against Birmingham City.

=== Celtic ===
On 10 March 2021, Sheffield Wednesday confirmed that Shaw had signed a pre-contract agreement with Scottish Premiership side Celtic, but would "remain a Sheffield Wednesday player until the expiry of his current contract and will be available for selection for the remainder of the season". It was officially confirmed by Celtic on 15 June 2021, where they announced he had signed a four-year contract with the club. He made his debut for Celtic in a UEFA Europa League tie against Real Betis on 9 December 2021.

==== Loans ====
After making only one further appearance for Celtic in the first part of the 2021–22 season, Shaw was loaned to Motherwell in January 2022.

The following season he joined Morecambe on loan for the season.

In July 2023, he joined Wigan Athletic on a season-long loan deal.

=== Fleetwood Town ===
On 4 October 2024, Shaw joined League Two side Fleetwood Town on a contract until the end of the season.

=== Northampton Town ===
On 3 January 2025, Shaw joined League One side Northampton Town on a two-and-a-half year deal for an undisclosed fee having had his release clause triggered. Shaw picked up an ACL injury against Barnsley on the 25 February, with manager Kevin Nolan confirming he would miss the remainder of the season.

== Career statistics ==
As of match played 1 July 2026

Appearances and goals by club, season and competition
Club	Season	League			National Cup		League Cup		Other		Total	
Club	Season	Division	Apps	Goals	Apps	Goals	Apps	Goals	Apps	Goals	Apps	Goals
Sheffield Wednesday	2019–20	EFL Championship	2	0	—		—		—		2	0
Sheffield Wednesday	2020–21	EFL Championship	19	1	1	0	2	0	—		22	1
Sheffield Wednesday	Total		21	1	1	0	2	0	0	0	24	1
Chesterfield (loan)	2019–20	National League	4	0	0	0	—		1	0	5	0
Celtic	2021–22	Scottish Premiership	1	0	0	0	0	0	1	0	2	0
Celtic	2022–23	Scottish Premiership	0	0	0	0	0	0	0	0	0	0
Celtic	2023–24	Scottish Premiership	0	0	0	0	0	0	0	0	0	0
Celtic	Total		1	0	0	0	0	0	1	0	2	0
Motherwell (loan)	2021–22	Scottish Premiership	7	0	0	0	0	0	0	0	7	0
Morecambe (loan)	2022–23	EFL League One	34	2	1	0	1	0	3 (Note: Appearance(s) in the EFL Trophy)	0	39	2
Wigan Athletic (loan)	2023–24	EFL League One	20	0	3	0	0	0	3	0	26	0
Fleetwood Town	2024–25	EFL League Two	11	0	1	0	—		2	0	14	0
Northampton Town	2024–25	EFL League One	8	2	—		—		—		8	2
Northampton Town	2025–26	EFL League One	0	0	0	0	0	0	—		0	0
Northampton Town	2026–27	EFL League Two	0	0	0	0	0	0	—		0	0
Northampton Town	Total		8	2	0	0	0	0	0	0	8	2
Career total			106	5	6	0	3	0	10	0	125	5

== Honours ==
Celtic

- Scottish League Cup: 2021–22
