= Jacob Mensah =

Ghanaian footballer

Personal information
- Full name: Jacob Kwabena Mensah
- Date of birth: 18 July 2000 (age 26)
- Place of birth: Lambeth, England
- Position: Centre-back

Team information
- Current team: Braintree Town
- Number: 5

Youth career
- –2016: Ramsgate

Senior career*
Years	Team	Apps	(Gls)
2016–2019	Ramsgate	50	(0)
2019–2020	Crystal Palace	0	(0)
2020–2021	Weymouth	26	(1)
2021–2022	Morecambe	1	(0)
2022	Maidstone United	8	(0)
2023	Torquay United	3	(0)
2023–2024	Dover Athletic	34	(1)
2024	Welling United	6	(0)
2024–2026	Dover Athletic	66	(2)
2026–	Braintree Town	7	(0)
- * Club domestic league appearances and goals as of 16:40, 1 November 2026 (UTC)

Jacob Kwabena Mensah (born 18 July 2000) is an English-Ghanaian professional footballer who plays as a central defender for National League South club Braintree Town.

== Career ==
Mensah began his career with Isthmian Division side, Ramsgate, breaking into the first-team in 2016 and making over 70 appearances for the club. In February 2019, Mensah was named as one of the best young players in Non-League football by The Non-League Paper, likening him to Chris Smalling. Following a trial with Brighton & Hove Albion, Mensah joined Crystal Palace in March 2019 following a successful trial period, linking up with the Premier League side's U23s side on an 18-month contract. Mensah was released by the club at the end of the 2019–20 season.

=== Weymouth ===
Following his release from Crystal Palace, Mensah joined newly promoted National League side Weymouth in January 2021. Mensah made 27 appearances over the course of the second half of the season, scored his first professional goal against Yeovil and was the first Weymouth player to score against the Glovers in 25 years, and formed a strong defensive partnership with Aston Villa loanee Dominic Revan as Weymouth finished in 18th position. Mensah departed the club at the end of the season.

=== Morecambe ===
On 13 July 2021, Mensah joined newly promoted League One club Morecambe on a one-year deal, for an undisclosed fee. On 10 August, he made his debut when he came off of the bench in the 78th minute. Morecambe came from behind to earn a 2–1 victory away at Blackburn Rovers in the EFL Cup First Round. Mensah featured in games against Everton and Hartlepool in the Papa Johns trophy and then was named on the bench against Tottenham Hotspur on 9 January 2022 in the FA Cup. Mensah then made his EFL league debut away to Shrewsbury on 15 March 2022. Mensah was released by the club at the end of the 2021–22 season.

=== Maidstone United ===
On 8 October 2022, Mensah signed for National League club Maidstone United.

=== Torquay United ===
On 19 January 2023, Mensah joined Torquay United. He was released by the club at the end of the season following their relegation.

=== Dover Athletic ===
On 9 September 2023, Mensah signed for National League South club Dover Athletic. He was offered a new contract at the end of the 2023–24 season following relegation.

=== Welling United ===
Having rejected the new contract offer from Dover Athletic, Mensah returned to the National League South in August 2024, joining Welling United following a successful trial period. He departed the club just one month into the season.

=== Return to Dover Athletic ===
On 29 October 2024, Mensah returned to Isthmian League Premier Division side Dover Athletic.

=== Braintree Town ===
On 10 July 2026, Mensah agreed to join fellow National League South side, Braintree Town.

== Career statistics ==
As of 31 October 2026

Appearances and goals by club, season and competition
Club	Season	League			FA Cup		League Cup		Other		Total	
Club	Season	Division	Apps	Goals	Apps	Goals	Apps	Goals	Apps	Goals	Apps	Goals
Ramsgate	2016–17	Isthmian League Division One South	2	0	0	0	—		0	0	2	0
Ramsgate	2017–18	Isthmian League South Division	25	0	0	0	—		1 (Note: Appearance(s) in Alan Turvey Trophy)	0	36	0
Ramsgate	2018–19	Isthmian League South East Division	23	0	5	0	—		4 (Note: Three appearances in FA Trophy, one in Alan Turvey Trophy)	0	32	0
Ramsgate	Total		50	0	5	0	—		5	0	70	0
Weymouth	2020–21	National League	26	1	—		—		1 (Note: Appearance(s) in FA Trophy)	0	27	1
Morecambe	2021–22	League One	1	0	0	0	1	0	2 (Note: Appearance(s) in EFL Trophy)	0	4	0
Maidstone United	2022–23	National League	8	0	1	0	—		0	0	9	0
Torquay United	2022–23	National League	3	0	0	0	—		0	0	3	0
Dover Athletic	2023–24	National League South	34	1	3	0	—		1	0	38	1
Welling United	2024–25	National League South	6	0	1	0	—		0	0	7	0
Dover Athletic	2024–25	Isthmian League Premier Division	30	0	0	0	—		3 (Note: One appearance in Kent Senior Cup, two appearances in Isthmian League Premier Division play-offs)	0	33	0
Dover Athletic	2025–26	National League South	36	2	1	0	—		2	0	39	2
Dover Athletic	Total		66	2	1	0	—		5	0	72	2
Braintree Town	2026–27	National League South	7	0	1	1	—		1 (Note: Appearance(s) in National League Cup)	0	9	1
Career total			201	4	12	1	1	0	15	0	229	5

== Honours ==
Dover Athletic

- Isthmian League Premier Division play-off winners: 2024–25
