= Nathan Snowball =

English footballer (born 2008)

Personal information
- Date of birth: 12 June 2008 (age 18)
- Place of birth: Sunderland, England
- Position: Defender

Team information
- Current team: Preston North End

Youth career
- –2025: Morecambe
- 2025–: Preston North End

Senior career*
Years	Team	Apps	(Gls)
2024–2025	Morecambe	0	(0)
2024–2025	→ Morpeth Town (loan)	4	(0)
2025–	Preston North End	0	(0)
2026	→ Bamber Bridge FC (loan)	?	(?)
2026	→ FC United of Manchester (loan)	6	(0)
- * Club domestic league appearances and goals as of 19:00, 23 July 2025 (UTC)

Nathan Snowball is an English footballer who plays as a defender for Northern Premier League club FC United of Manchester on loan from EFL Championship club Preston North End.

== Career ==
Snowball made his debut for Morecambe at the age of 16 in a 2–1 defeat to Carlisle United in an EFL Trophy group stage game at the Mazuma Mobile Stadium on 12 November 2024. In December 2024, he joined Northern Premier League Premier Division side Morpeth Town on a one-month work experience loan. After being an unused substitute against Workington, he started all of the next four league matches before returning to Morecambe. He was named Morecambe Academy First Year Player of the Season at the end of the 2024–25 season.

On 21 August 2025, Snowball joined Championship club Preston North End on a one-year scholarship, agreeing in advance to a two-year professional contract upon this initial scholarship's expiry.

== Career statistics ==
As of match played 18 January 2025

Appearances and goals by club, season and competition
Club	Season	League			FA Cup		EFL Cup		Other		Total	
Club	Season	Division	Apps	Goals	Apps	Goals	Apps	Goals	Apps	Goals	Apps	Goals
Morecambe	2024–25	EFL League Two	0	0	0	0	0	0	1 (Note: Appearance(s) in the EFL Trophy)	0	1	0
Morpeth Town (loan)	2024–25	NPL Premier Division	4	0	0	0	—		0	0	4	0
Career total			4	0	0	0	0	0	1	0	5	0
