= Adam Fairclough =

Adam Fairclough may refer to:

- Adam Fairclough (historian) (born 1952), British historian of the United States
- Adam Fairclough (footballer) (born 2007), English footballer
