= David Tutonda =

Congolese footballer (born 1995)

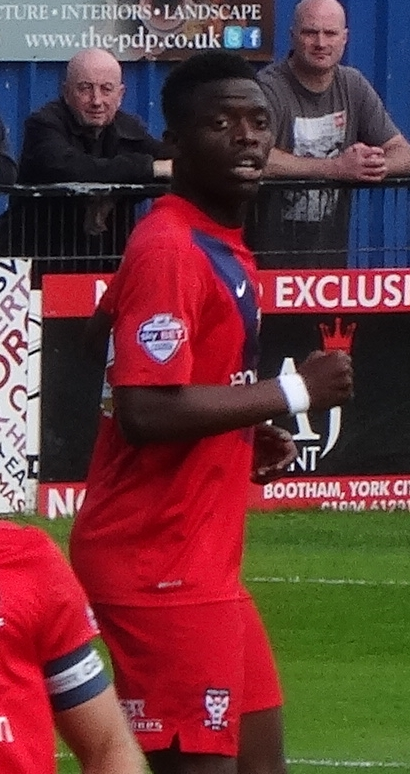
- Tutonda playing for York City in 2015

Personal information
- Full name: David Mabanga Tutonda
- Date of birth: 11 October 1995 (age 31)
- Place of birth: Kinshasa, Zaire
- Height: 1.80 m (5 ft 11 in)
- Position: Centre-back

Team information
- Current team: Accrington Stanley
- Number: 33

Youth career
- 2012–2014: Cardiff City

Senior career*
Years	Team	Apps	(Gls)
2014–2017	Cardiff City	0	(0)
2015	→ Newport County (loan)	12	(2)
2015	→ York City (loan)	12	(0)
2017–2020	Barnet	92	(3)
2020–2021	Bristol Rovers	20	(0)
2021–2023	Gillingham	54	(1)
2023–2025	Morecambe	79	(2)
2025–2026	Rochdale	10	(0)
2026–	Accrington Stanley	0	(0)
- * Club domestic league appearances and goals as of 18:40, 2 July 2026 (UTC)

David Mabanga Tutonda (born 11 October 1995) is a Congolese professional footballer who plays as a centre-back for EFL League Two club Accrington Stanley.

== Career ==
=== Cardiff City ===
Tutonda was spotted by Cardiff City academy manager Neal Ardley while playing in a showcase match, who signed him in October 2012. He was offered a professional contract with Cardiff in April 2014.

On 13 February 2015, he joined League Two club Newport County on an initial one-month loan. Tutonda made his Football League debut for Newport the following day in the starting line-up for the fixture against Wycombe Wanderers. Newport won the match 2–1. He scored his first Football League goal for Newport on 18 April 2015 in the 3–2 defeat to Dagenham & Redbridge.

Tutonda joined League Two club York City on 7 August 2015 on a six-month loan. He made his debut a day later in the opening match of the 2015–16 season, a 3–0 away defeat to Wycombe Wanderers. The loan was terminated early on 27 November 2015.

=== Barnet ===
On 31 December 2016, Tutonda agreed to sign for League Two club Barnet on a two-year contract, effective from 1 January 2017. He scored his first goal for the club on 29 April 2017 in a 3–1 win over Grimsby Town. He left the club at the end of the 2019–20 season, having played 113 games for the Bees, scoring five goals.

=== Bristol Rovers ===
On 28 August 2020, Tutonda joined Bristol Rovers on a free transfer, signing a two-year deal following a successful trial period. He made his debut for the club on the opening day of the season, replacing Luke Leahy in the 73 minute of a 1–1 away draw at Sunderland and made his first league start three weeks later, playing the entirety of a 2–0 home victory over Northampton Town. On 18 June 2021, Tutonda had his contract terminated by Rovers in order to allow him to pursue opportunities elsewhere.

=== Gillingham ===
Having departed Rovers, Tutonda joined Gillingham on 18 June 2021.

In May 2023, manager Neil Harris confirmed that Tutonda had been offered a new contract at the club.

=== Morecambe ===
Tutonda left Gillingham at the end of his contract and on 11 August 2023 signed a one-year deal with Morecambe.

=== Rochdale ===
On 3 July 2025, Tutonda joined National League side Rochdale on an initial one-year deal. On 18 May 2026, the club announced it was releasing him.

=== Accrington Stanley ===
On 16 July 2026, Tutonda joined League Two club Accrington Stanley on a one-year deal.

== Personal life ==
Tutonda was born in Kinshasa, DR Congo and moved to London, England with his family at the age of five. He did not start playing football until the age of 12.

== Career statistics ==
As of end of 2025–26 season

Appearances and goals by club, season and competition
Club	Season	League			FA Cup		League Cup		Other		Total	
Club	Season	Division	Apps	Goals	Apps	Goals	Apps	Goals	Apps	Goals	Apps	Goals
Cardiff City	2014–15	Championship	0	0	0	0	0	0	—		0	0
Cardiff City	2015–16	Championship	0	0	0	0	—		—		0	0
Cardiff City	2016–17	Championship	0	0	—		0	0	—		0	0
Cardiff City	Total		0	0	0	0	0	0	—		0	0
Newport County (loan)	2014–15	League Two	12	2	—		—		—		12	2
York City (loan)	2015–16	League Two	12	0	0	0	1	0	1 (Note: Appearance(s) in EFL Trophy)	0	14	0
Barnet	2016–17	League Two	7	1	—		—		—		7	1
Barnet	2017–18	League Two	41	0	1	0	2	0	3	0	47	0
Barnet	2018–19	National League	20	0	4	2	0	0	3 (Note: Appearances in FA Trophy)	0	27	2
Barnet	2019–20	National League	24	2	2	0	0	0	6 (Note: Four appearances in FA Trophy, two appearances in National League playoffs)	0	32	2
Barnet	Total		92	3	7	2	2	0	12	0	113	5
Bristol Rovers	2020–21	League One	20	0	0	0	0	0	2	0	22	0
Gillingham	2021–22	League One	29	0	0	0	2	0	1	0	32	0
Gillingham	2022–23	League Two	25	1	2	0	3	0	1	0	31	1
Gillingham	Total		54	1	2	0	5	0	2	0	63	1
Morecambe	2023–24	League Two	37	2	3	0	0	0	2	0	42	2
Morecambe	2024–25	League Two	42	0	1	0	1	0	3	0	47	0
Morecambe	Total		79	2	4	0	1	0	5	0	89	2
Rochdale	2025–26	National League	10	0	0	0	—		5 (Note: Two appearances in FA Trophy, three appearances in National League Cup)	0	15	0
Career total			279	8	13	2	9	0	27	0	328	10
