= Rhys Williams (footballer, born 2001) =

English footballer

Personal information
- Full name: Rhys Williams
- Date of birth: 3 February 2001 (age 25)
- Place of birth: Preston, England
- Height: 6 ft 5 in (1.95 m)
- Position: Centre-back

Youth career
- 2011–2019: Liverpool

Senior career*
Years	Team	Apps	(Gls)
2019–2026	Liverpool	9	(0)
2019–2020	→ Kidderminster Harriers (loan)	26	(1)
2021–2022	→ Swansea City (loan)	5	(0)
2022–2023	→ Blackpool (loan)	17	(0)
2023–2024	→ Aberdeen (loan)	0	(0)
2024	→ Port Vale (loan)	0	(0)
2024–2025	→ Morecambe (loan)	33	(1)

International career
2019	England U18	4	(0)
2019	England U19	2	(0)
2020	England U21	2	(0)
- * Club domestic league appearances and goals as of 18:52, 12 April 2025 (UTC)

Rhys Williams (born 3 February 2001) is an English professional footballer who plays as a centre-back.

Williams came through the Academy at Liverpool, winning the FA Youth Cup in 2019. He spent the 2019–20 season on loan at Kidderminster Harriers. He made his first-team debut for Liverpool in September 2020 and made 19 appearances in the 2020–21 campaign, including nine Premier League and six UEFA Champions League games. He spent the first half of the 2021–22 season on loan at Swansea City and then was loaned to Blackpool for the first half of the 2022–23 season. He spent the first half of the 2023–24 campaign on loan at Aberdeen but did not play a league game in Scotland before being loaned out to Port Vale, where he again did not feature. He was loaned to Morecambe for the 2024–25 season.

== Early life ==
Rhys Williams was born on 3 February 2001 in Preston, Lancashire.

== Club career ==
=== Liverpool ===
Williams joined Liverpool's academy aged nine and won the FA Youth Cup with their youth team in 2019 when they defeated Manchester City in a penalty shoot-out. On 31 July 2019, he joined Kidderminster Harriers on a half-season loan. The loan came about due to connections between Harriers boss John Pemberton and Liverpool's assistant academy director. The deal was extended to cover the entire season and he went on to make 26 National League North appearances for the club in the 2019–20 campaign, scoring his first goal in senior football with a header in a 3–0 win at Bradford (Park Avenue) on 10 August. Kidderminster finished in 16th place, but had conceded only four more goals than second-placed Kings Lynn Town.

"The one that arrived was a young academy graduate, six-foot-five baby face, obviously technically very good. The player that left, left with a broken nose, with experience of being sent off and scoring goals, and learning that it really mattered playing with players who at this level live month to month, rent by rent."

— Harriers manager Russell Penn, reflecting on Williams's loan spell at his club.

In September 2020, Williams signed a long-term contract with Liverpool. He made his first-team debut for the club in the EFL Cup on 24 September, against Lincoln City, partnering Virgil van Dijk in central defence. On 21 October, Williams came on as a 90th-minute substitute against AFC Ajax in the UEFA Champions League. He made his second Champions League appearance the following week, where he came on as a 30th-minute substitute against FC Midtjylland after an injury to Fabinho. Liverpool went on to win 2–0, with Jürgen Klopp praising his performance after the game, saying to the press, "He did well, everything looks promising." On 4 November, Williams played the full ninety minutes in a Champions League tie at Atalanta, keeping a clean sheet in a 5–0 win. On 16 December, he made his Premier League debut with a start in a 2–1 win against Tottenham Hotspur. On 8 May, he slotted back alongside Nat Phillips in a 2–0 win over Southampton. Williams played each of the last five games of the 2020–21 season, all five victories, with three clean sheets, as Liverpool finished third; he played a total of 19 games throughout the campaign as the club suffered a defensive crisis that left the three first-choice centre-backs sidelined.

On 31 August 2021, Williams signed a new contract with Liverpool and joined Swansea City on a loan deal to last the 2021–22 season. He allegedly suffered racist abuse during a match at Luton Town in September. Williams proved unable to dislodge Kyle Naughton, Ryan Bennett and Ryan Manning in Swansea's back three, causing manager Russell Martin to admit that "I don't think they'll [Liverpool] be overly happy he's not involved, but we have to what's right for our football team and our club". Williams played just five Championship games and Liverpool recalled him on 20 January. He wrote on Instagram: "Gutted it didn't go to plan but it's been a pleasure to be a Swan for the time I was given."

Williams returned to the Championship on loan at Blackpool on 19 July 2022, on a deal due to the run for the whole of the 2022–23 campaign. He made his debut for the club in a 1–0 victory over Reading at Bloomfield Road on 29 July. He started the season in good form. After 17 appearances for the Seasiders, Williams was recalled to Liverpool on 23 January after he lost his place in the team and manager Michael Appleton was sacked.

On 23 June 2023, Williams joined Aberdeen on a season-long loan. His loan at Pittodrie was cut short as he was recalled to Liverpool on 3 January, having not made a league appearance for the Dons. Liverpool manager Jürgen Klopp said that Williams would have expected to play "from the first to the last second" in the Scottish Premiership. Aberdeen manager Barry Robson explained that "Rhys came up injured and has struggled". On 16 January 2024, he joined League One club Port Vale on loan until the end of the 2023–24 season. However, he did not make a matchday squad. He was recalled to Liverpool on 1 February for rehabilitation due to an injury.

On 20 August 2024, he joined League Two club Morecambe on loan until January 2025. He said that he wanted manager Derek Adams to be able to trust him and was "delighted" at the chance to play first-team football. On 2 January, his loan was extended until the end of the 2024–25 season. He played 38 games for the club as Morecambe were relegated into non-League football. He was released upon his expiry of his contract at the end of the 2025–26 season.

== International career ==
Williams played for the England U18 team between March and May 2019. He was called up for the England U-19 team for the International Marbella Cup in October 2019. On 5 October 2020, Williams received his first call-up to the England U-21 squad, and made his debut during a 3–3 draw against Andorra on 7 October 2020.

== Career statistics ==
As of match played 12 April 2025

Appearances and goals by club, season and competition
Club	Season	League			National Cup (Note: Includes FA Cup)		League Cup (Note: Includes EFL Cup, Scottish League Cup)		Europe		Other		Total	
Club	Season	Division	Apps	Goals	Apps	Goals	Apps	Goals	Apps	Goals	Apps	Goals	Apps	Goals
Liverpool	2019–20	Premier League	0	0	0	0	0	0	0	0	0	0	0	0
Liverpool	2020–21	Premier League	9	0	2	0	2	0	6 (Note: Appearances in UEFA Champions League)	0	—		19	0
Liverpool	2021–22	Premier League	0	0	0	0	0	0	0	0	—		0	0
Liverpool	2022–23	Premier League	0	0	0	0	0	0	0	0	0	0	0	0
Liverpool	2023–24	Premier League	0	0	0	0	0	0	0	0	—		0	0
Liverpool	2024–25	Premier League	0	0	0	0	0	0	0	0	—		0	0
Liverpool	2025–26	Premier League	0	0	0	0	0	0	0	0	0	0	0	0
Liverpool	Total		9	0	2	0	2	0	6	0	0	0	19	0
Kidderminster Harriers (loan)	2019–20	National League North	26	1	—		—		—		—		26	1
Swansea City (loan)	2021–22	Championship	5	0	1	0	1	0	—		—		7	0
Blackpool (loan)	2022–23	Championship	17	0	—		—		—		—		17	0
Aberdeen (loan)	2023–24	Scottish Premiership	0	0	0	0	0	0	0	0	—		0	0
Aberdeen U20 (loan)	2023–24	—	—		—		—		—		1 (Note: Appearance in Scottish Challenge Cup)	0	1	0
Port Vale (loan)	2023–24	League One	0	0	—		—		—		—		0	0
Morecambe (loan)	2024–25	League Two	33	1	3	1	—		—		2 (Note: Appearances in EFL Trophy)	0	38	2
Career total			90	2	6	1	3	0	6	0	3	0	108	3

== Honours ==
Liverpool Academy

- FA Youth Cup: 2018–19
