= Kayden Harrack =

Grenadian footballer

Personal information
- Full name: Kayden Michael Harrack
- Date of birth: 5 November 2003 (age 23)
- Place of birth: Ealing, England
- Height: 1.85 m (6 ft 1 in)
- Position: Centre-back

Team information
- Current team: Dagenham & Redbridge
- Number: 22

Youth career
- 2011–2016: Brentford
- 2016–2023: Queens Park Rangers

Senior career*
Years	Team	Apps	(Gls)
2023–2024	Queens Park Rangers	0	(0)
2024	Morecambe	15	(0)
2024–	Dagenham & Redbridge	53	(7)

International career^{‡}
2022–	Grenada	24	(1)
- * Club domestic league appearances and goals as of 10:29, 13 November 2026 (UTC) ‡ National team caps and goals as of 16:26, 12 November 2026 (UTC)

Kayden Michael Harrack (born 5 November 2003) is a professional footballer who plays as a centre-back for National League South club Dagenham & Redbridge. Born in England, he plays for the Grenada national team.

== Club career ==
Harrack starting playing football with the youth academy of Brentford at the age of 8, and moved to Queens Park Rangers at the age of 13. He went on trial with Arsenal in the summer of 2020, and Fulham in the autumn of 2020.

In August 2023, he signed a first professional six-month contract. He departed Queens Park Rangers upon the expiration of this deal, joining League Two club Morecambe on a contract until the end of the season.

On 31 December 2024, Harrack had his contract with Morecambe terminated by mutual consent, allowing him to join National League side Dagenham & Redbridge on an 18-month deal.

== International career ==
Born in England, Harrack is of Grenadian descent. He was called up to represent the Grenada national team for a set of friendlies in March 2022. He debuted with Grenada in a 0–0 friendly tie with Gibraltar on 24 March 2022, coming on as a late sub in the 79th minute.

== Career statistics ==
=== Club ===
As of match played 29 August 2026

Appearances and goals by club, season and competition
Club	Season	League			FA Cup		League Cup		Other		Total	
Club	Season	Division	Apps	Goals	Apps	Goals	Apps	Goals	Apps	Goals	Apps	Goals
Morecambe	2023–24	League Two	7	0	—		—		—		7	0
Morecambe	2024–25	League Two	8	0	1	0	1	0	3 (Note: Appearance(s) in EFL Trophy)	0	13	0
Morecambe	Total		15	0	1	0	1	0	3	0	20	0
Dagenham & Redbridge	2024–25	National League	12	0	—		—		1 (Note: Appearance in National League Cup)	0	13	0
Dagenham & Redbridge	2025–26	National League South	37	6	3	0	—		2 (Note: Appearance(s) in FA Trophy)	0	42	6
Dagenham & Redbridge	2026–27	National League South	4	1	0	0	—		0	0	4	1
Dagenham & Redbridge	Total		53	7	3	0	—		3	0	59	7
Career total			68	7	4	0	1	0	6	0	79	7

=== International ===
As of match played 5 October 2026

Appearances and goals by national team and year
National team	Year	Apps	Goals
Grenada	2022	5	0
Grenada	2023	6	0
Grenada	2024	4	0
Grenada	2025	4	1
Grenada	2025	5	0
Total		24	1
