= Adam Lewis (footballer) =

English footballer (born 1999)

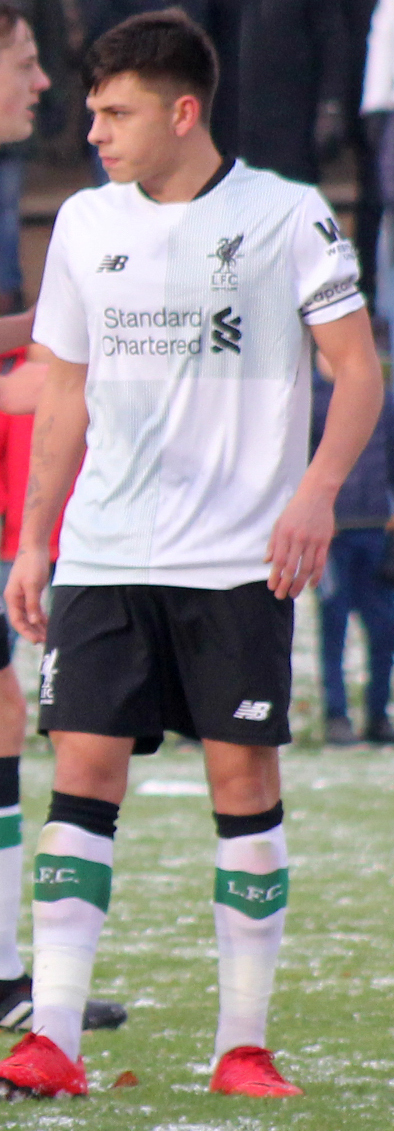
- Lewis playing for Liverpool U18 in 2017

Personal information
- Full name: Adam Thomas Lewis
- Date of birth: 8 November 1999 (age 26)
- Place of birth: Liverpool, England
- Height: 5 ft 9 in (1.75 m)
- Position: Left-back

Team information
- Current team: AFC Fylde (on loan from Chesterfield)
- Number: 31

Youth career
- –2019: Liverpool

Senior career*
| Years | Team | Apps | (Gls) |
| 2019–2024 | Liverpool | 0 | (0) |
| 2020–2021 | → Amiens (loan) | 9 | (0) |
| 2021 | → Plymouth Argyle (loan) | 20 | (1) |
| 2021–2022 | → Livingston (loan) | 9 | (0) |
| 2022–2024 | → Newport County (loan) | 47 | (3) |
| 2024–2025 | Morecambe | 36 | (1) |
| 2025–2026 | Chesterfield | 14 | (1) |
| 2026 | → AFC Fylde (loan) | 11 | (1) |

International career^{‡}
| 2014 | England U16 | 2 | (0) |
| 2015 | England U17 | 5 | (2) |
| 2018 | England U19 | 6 | (0) |
| 2018 | England U20 | 3 | (0) |
- * Club domestic league appearances and goals as of 20:40, 24 Jun 2026 (UTC) ‡ National team caps and goals as of 13:05, 5 February 2020 (UTC)

Adam Thomas Lewis (born 8 November 1999) is an English professional footballer who plays as a left-back for National League North club AFC Fylde on loan from Chesterfield.

== Early life ==
Lewis was born in Liverpool, Merseyside.

== Club career ==
=== Liverpool ===
Lewis signed a long-term contract with Liverpool in February 2019 and made his first-team debut on 4 February 2020 in an FA Cup fourth-round replay against Shrewsbury Town.

==== Amiens (loan) ====
Lewis joined French Ligue 2 club Amiens on loan for the 2020–21 season.

==== Plymouth Argyle (loan) ====
On 14 January 2021, Lewis returned to England to join EFL League One side Plymouth Argyle on loan until the end of the 2020-21 season. He scored his first goal for Argyle on 19 January, in his full debut for the club.

==== Livingston (loan) ====
On 10 June 2021, Lewis joined Scottish Premiership side Livingston on a season-long loan deal.

==== Newport County (loans) ====
On 23 June 2022, Lewis joined EFL League Two side Newport County on loan for the 2022-23 season. He made his debut for Newport on the 6 August 2022 as a second half substitute in the 1-0 League Two defeat to Walsall. Lewis scored his first goal for Newport in the 1-1 League Two draw against Rochdale on 7 January 2023. His loan at Newport was cut short on 25 February 2023 by a season ending injury.

In July 2023 Lewis rejoined Newport County on loan for the 2023-24 season.

On 5 June 2024, it was announced that Lewis would be departing Liverpool upon the expiration of his contract at the end of the month.

=== Morecambe ===
Lewis was one of 15 free agents that signed for League Two club Morecambe on 12 July 2024, after the club's embargo on registering new players was lifted.

=== Chesterfield and AFC Fylde ===
In June 2025, Lewis signed for Chesterfield on a free transfer, making his debut on 2 August 2025 in a 1–0 EFL League Two win over Barrow at SMH Group Stadium.

Lewis signed on loan for National League North side AFC Fylde in March 2026; he made his first appearance for the club in a 2–1 league win over AFC Telford United on 10 March, and was part of the team that won promotion to the 2026–27 National League as champions.

On 22 May 2026, Chesterfield announced the player was being released.

== International career ==
Lewis represented the England under-16 team against Scotland in the 2014 Victory Shield. He was a member of the squad that competed at the 2018 UEFA European Under-19 Championship and later that year made his debut for the under-20 team.

== Career statistics ==
As of 25 April 2026

Appearances and goals by club, season and competition
| Club | Season | League | | | National Cup (Note: Includes FA Cup) | | League Cup | | Other | | Total | |
| Club | Season | Division | Apps | Goals | Apps | Goals | Apps | Goals | Apps | Goals | Apps | Goals |
|---|---|---|---|---|---|---|---|---|---|---|---|---|
| Liverpool U21 | 2019–20 | — | | | — | | — | | 1 (Note: Appearance in EFL Trophy) | 0 | 1 | 0 |
| Liverpool | 2019–20 | Premier League | 0 | 0 | 1 | 0 | 0 | 0 | 0 | 0 | 1 | 0 |
| Liverpool | 2020–21 | Premier League | 0 | 0 | 0 | 0 | 0 | 0 | 0 | 0 | 0 | 0 |
| Liverpool | 2021–22 | Premier League | 0 | 0 | 0 | 0 | 0 | 0 | 0 | 0 | 0 | 0 |
| Liverpool | 2022–23 | Premier League | 0 | 0 | 0 | 0 | 0 | 0 | 0 | 0 | 0 | 0 |
| Liverpool | Total | | 0 | 0 | 1 | 0 | 0 | 0 | 0 | 0 | 1 | 0 |
| Amiens (loan) | 2020–21 | Ligue 2 | 9 | 0 | 0 | 0 | 0 | 0 | — | | 9 | 0 |
| Plymouth Argyle (loan) | 2020–21 | League One | 20 | 1 | 0 | 0 | 0 | 0 | 0 | 0 | 20 | 1 |
| Livingston (loan) | 2021–22 | Scottish Premiership | 9 | 0 | 0 | 0 | 5 | 0 | — | | 14 | 0 |
| Newport County (loan) | 2022–23 | League Two | 21 | 1 | 1 | 0 | 3 | 0 | 3 | 0 | 28 | 1 |
| Newport County (loan) | 2023–24 | League Two | 26 | 2 | 2 | 0 | 1 | 0 | 0 | 0 | 29 | 2 |
| Newport County (loan) | Total | | 47 | 3 | 3 | 0 | 4 | 0 | 3 | 0 | 57 | 3 |
| Morecambe | 2024–25 | League Two | 44 | 1 | 3 | 0 | 1 | 0 | 4 | 0 | 52 | 1 |
| Chesterfield | 2025–26 | League Two | 14 | 1 | 1 | 0 | 0 | 0 | 3 | 1 | 18 | 2 |
| Fylde | 2025–26 | National League North | 11 | 1 | 0 | 0 | 0 | 0 | 0 | 0 | 11 | 1 |
| Career total | | | 154 | 7 | 8 | 0 | 10 | 0 | 11 | 1 | 183 | 8 |

== Honours ==
AFC Fylde

- National League North: 2025–26
