= Lennon Dobson =

English footballer (born 200?)

Personal information
- Full name: Lennon Liam Dobson
- Date of birth: 20 May 2005 (age 21)
- Place of birth: Wigan, England
- Height: 1.68 m (5 ft 6 in)
- Position: Midfielder

Team information
- Current team: Morecambe
- Number: 26

Youth career
- –2023: Morecambe

Senior career*
Years	Team	Apps	(Gls)
2023–	Morecambe	3	(0)
- * Club domestic league appearances and goals as of 23:40, 12 November 2024 (UTC)

Lennon Liam Dobson (born 20 May 2005) is an English professional footballer who plays as a midfielder for National League North club Morecambe.

== Career statistics ==
As of match played 19 October 2024

Appearances and goals by club, season and competition
Club	Season	League			FA Cup		EFL Cup		Other		Total	
Club	Season	Division	Apps	Goals	Apps	Goals	Apps	Goals	Apps	Goals	Apps	Goals
Morecambe	2024–25	EFL League Two	1	0	0	0	0	0	0	0	1	0
Career total			1	0	0	0	0	0	0	0	1	0
