= 2020–21 Liverpool F.C. season =

English football club season

Liverpool
2020–21 season
- Owner: Fenway Sports Group
- Chairman: Tom Werner
- Manager: Jürgen Klopp
- Stadium: Anfield
- Premier League: 3rd
- FA Cup: Fourth round
- EFL Cup: Fourth round
- UEFA Champions League: Quarter-finals
- FA Community Shield: Runners-up
- Top goalscorer: League: Mohamed Salah (22); All: Mohamed Salah (31)
Home colours	Away colours	Third colours

The 2020–21 season was Liverpool Football Club's 129th season in existence and their 59th consecutive season in the top flight of English football. In addition to the domestic league, Liverpool participated in this season's editions of the FA Cup, the EFL Cup, the FA Community Shield and the UEFA Champions League. The season covered the period from August 2020 to 30 June 2021. This was the first season since 2013–14 without Dejan Lovren, who departed to Zenit Saint Petersburg and Adam Lallana, who departed to Brighton and Hove Albion.

== Season overview ==
The season was notably difficult, as the majority of games were played behind closed doors due to the COVID-19 pandemic, and all three of the club's senior central defenders sustained long-term injuries. The team's early form was creditable and, on 22 November 2020, they broke the club record for longest unbeaten run at home in the league (which had previously stood at 63) with a 3–0 win over Leicester City. However, the run ended on 21 January 2021 following a 1–0 defeat to Burnley; it had stood at 68, the second-longest unbeaten home run in English top-flight history, behind Chelsea's run of 86 games between March 2004 and October 2008, and the longest under a single manager. A tough period followed as Liverpool suffered a run of six consecutive defeats at Anfield. This ended any chance the team had of retaining the Premier League title as by early March, Liverpool sat 8th in the table with 43 points. The team, however, was able to reverse their fortunes, winning eight of their final ten league games, which included goalkeeper Alisson Becker scoring a stoppage-time winner against West Bromwich Albion (the first goal ever scored by a Liverpool goalkeeper in the 129-year history of the club), meaning they finished third with 69 points, qualifying for the next season's UEFA Champions League.

== First-team squad ==
Squad no.	Player	Nationality	Position(s)	Date of birth	Signed from	Apps	Goals	Assists
Goalkeepers
1	Alisson Becker	(Brazil)	GK	2 October 1992 (aged 28)	(Italy) Roma	130	1	1
13	Adrián	(Spain)	GK	3 January 1987 (aged 34)	(England) West Ham United	24	0	0
62	Caoimhín Kelleher	(Republic of Ireland)	GK	23 November 1998 (aged 22)	(England) LFC Academy	9	0	0
97	Marcelo Pitaluga	(Brazil)	GK	20 December 2002 (aged 18)	(Brazil) Fluminense	0	0	0
Defenders
4	Virgil van Dijk (3rd captain)	(Netherlands)	CB	8 July 1991 (aged 29)	(England) Southampton	130	13	6
12	Joe Gomez	(England)	CB/RB/LB	23 May 1997 (aged 24)	(England) Charlton Athletic	121	0	4
19	Ozan Kabak	(Turkey)	CB	25 March 2000 (aged 21)	(Germany) Schalke 04	13	0	0
21	Kostas Tsimikas	(Greece)	LB	12 May 1996 (aged 25)	(Greece) Olympiacos	7	0	0
26	Andy Robertson	(Scotland)	LB	11 March 1994 (aged 27)	(England) Hull City	177	5	37
28	Ben Davies	(England)	CB/LB	21 August 1995 (aged 25)	(England) Preston North End	0	0	0
32	Joël Matip	(Cameroon)	CB	8 August 1991 (aged 29)	(Germany) Schalke 04	123	6	3
46	Rhys Williams	(England)	CB	3 February 2001 (aged 20)	(England) LFC Academy	19	0	0
47	Nat Phillips	(England)	CB	21 March 1997 (aged 24)	(England) LFC Academy	21	1	1
66	Trent Alexander-Arnold	(England)	RB	7 October 1998 (aged 22)	(England) LFC Academy	179	10	43
76	Neco Williams	(Wales)	RB	13 April 2001 (aged 20)	(England) LFC Academy	25	0	2
Midfielders
3	Fabinho	(Brazil)	DM/RB/CB	23 October 1993 (aged 27)	(France) Monaco	122	3	6
5	Georginio Wijnaldum (4th captain)	(Netherlands)	CM/DM/AM	11 November 1990 (aged 30)	(England) Newcastle United	237	22	15
6	Thiago	(Spain)	CM/DM	11 April 1991 (aged 30)	(Germany) Bayern Munich	30	1	0
7	James Milner (vice-captain)	(England)	CM/DM/LB/RB	4 January 1986 (aged 35)	(England) Manchester City	250	26	40
8	Naby Keïta	(Guinea)	CM/AM	10 February 1995 (aged 26)	(Germany) RB Leipzig	76	7	4
14	Jordan Henderson (captain)	(England)	CM/DM/CB	17 June 1990 (aged 31)	(England) Sunderland	392	30	49
15	Alex Oxlade-Chamberlain	(England)	CM/AM/RW/LW	15 August 1993 (aged 27)	(England) Arsenal	104	14	11
17	Curtis Jones	(England)	CM/AM	30 January 2001 (aged 20)	(England) LFC Academy	47	7	6
23	Xherdan Shaqiri	(Switzerland)	RW/LW/AM/CM	10 October 1991 (aged 29)	(England) Stoke City	63	8	9
58	Ben Woodburn	(Wales)	AM/CM/LW/RW	15 October 1999 (aged 21)	(England) LFC Academy	11	1	0
Forwards
9	Roberto Firmino	(Brazil)	ST/AM	2 October 1991 (aged 29)	(Germany) 1899 Hoffenheim	292	87	63
10	Sadio Mané	(Senegal)	LW/RW/ST	10 April 1992 (aged 29)	(England) Southampton	218	97	37
11	Mohamed Salah	(Egypt)	RW/LW/ST	15 June 1992 (aged 29)	(Italy) Roma	203	125	43
20	Diogo Jota	(Portugal)	LW/RW/ST	4 December 1996 (aged 24)	(England) Wolverhampton Wanderers	30	13	1
27	Divock Origi	(Belgium)	ST/LW	18 April 1995 (aged 26)	(France) Lille	157	35	11

=== New contracts ===
Date	Position	No.	Player	Ref.
17 August 2020	DF	76	(Wales) Neco Williams	

== Transfers ==
=== Transfers in ===
Entry date	Position	No.	Player	From club	Fee	Ref.
10 August 2020	DF	21	(Greece) Kostas Tsimikas	(Greece) Olympiacos	£11,750,000 (Note: Fee may eventually rise to £15,000,000)	
18 September 2020	MF	6	(Spain) Thiago	(Germany) Bayern Munich	£20,000,000 (Note: Fee may eventually rise to £25,000,000)	
19 September 2020	FW	20	(Portugal) Diogo Jota	(England) Wolverhampton Wanderers	£41,000,000 (Note: Fee may eventually rise to £45,000,000)	
8 October 2020	GK	97	(Brazil) Marcelo Pitaluga	(Brazil) Fluminense	£1,000,000 (Note: Fee may eventually rise to £1,800,000)	
1 February 2021	DF	28	(England) Ben Davies	(England) Preston North End	£500,000 (Note: Fee may eventually rise to £1,600,000)	
Total					£74,250,000	

=== Loan in ===
Start date	End date	Position	No.	Player	From club	Fee	Ref
1 February 2021	End of season	DF	19	(Turkey) Ozan Kabak	(Germany) Schalke 04	£1,000,000 (Note: Fee may eventually rise to £1,500,000)	
Total						£1,000,000	

=== Transfers out ===
Exit date	Position	No.	Player	To club	Fee	Ref.
27 July 2020	GK	22	(England) Andy Lonergan	(England) Stoke City	Released	
27 July 2020	MF	20	(England) Adam Lallana	(England) Brighton & Hove Albion	Released	
27 July 2020	DF	6	(Croatia) Dejan Lovren	(Russia) Zenit Saint Petersburg	£10,900,000	
28 August 2020	MF	53	(England) Ovie Ejaria	(England) Reading	£3,000,000 (Note: Fee may eventually rise to £3,500,000)	
19 September 2020	DF	51	(Netherlands) Ki-Jana Hoever	(England) Wolverhampton Wanderers	£9,000,000 (Note: Fee may eventually rise to £13,500,000)	
2 October 2020	FW	24	(England) Rhian Brewster	(England) Sheffield United	£18,000,000 (Note: Fee may eventually rise to £23,500,000)	
16 October 2020	FW	55	(England) Herbie Kane	(England) Barnsley	£1,250,000	
Total					£42,150,000	

=== Loans out ===
Start date	End date	Position	No.	Player	To club	Fee	Ref
12 August 2020	2 January 2021	DF	—	(Wales) Morgan Boyes	(England) Fleetwood Town	None	
18 August 2020	14 January 2021	DF	—	(England) Adam Lewis	(France) Amiens SC	None	
7 September 2020	End of season	MF	54	(England) Sheyi Ojo	(Wales) Cardiff City	None	
14 September 2020	31 December 2020	DF	—	(England) Tony Gallacher	(Canada) Toronto FC	None	
19 September 2020	End of season	FW	—	(Nigeria) Taiwo Awoniyi	(Germany) Union Berlin	None	
28 September 2020	End of season	GK	22	(Germany) Loris Karius	(Germany) Union Berlin	None	
28 September 2020	End of season	GK	73	(Poland) Kamil Grabara	(Denmark) AGF	None	
6 October 2020	End of season	DF	—	(Colombia) Anderson Arroyo	(Spain) Salamanca	None	
6 October 2020	End of season	MF	16	(Serbia) Marko Grujić	(Portugal) Porto	£1,000,000	
16 October 2020	18 January 2021	MF	58	(Wales) Ben Woodburn	(England) Blackpool	None	
16 October 2020	End of season	MF	59	(Wales) Harry Wilson	(Wales) Cardiff City	£1,200,000	
16 October 2020	End of season	MF	67	(England) Harvey Elliott	(England) Blackburn Rovers	None	
5 January 2021	End of season	FW	—	(Canada) Liam Millar	(England) Charlton Athletic	None	
14 January 2021	End of season	DF	—	(England) Adam Lewis	(England) Plymouth Argyle	None	
1 February 2021	End of season	DF	72	(Netherlands) Sepp van den Berg	(England) Preston North End	None	
1 February 2021	End of season	FW	18	(Japan) Takumi Minamino	(England) Southampton	£500,000	
3 February 2021	30 November 2021	GK	—	(Czech Republic) Vítězslav Jaroš	(Republic of Ireland) St Patrick's Athletic	None	
Total						£2,700,000	

=== Transfer summary ===
Spending

Summer: ▼£ 73,750,000

Winter: ▼£ 1,500,000

Total: ▼£ 75,250,000

Income

Summer: ▲£ 44,350,000

Winter: ▲£ 500,000

Total: ▲£ 44,850,000

Net Expenditure

Summer: ▼£ 29,400,000

Winter: ▼£ 1,000,000

Total: ▼£ 30,400,000

== Pre-season friendlies ==
On 19 August 2020, Liverpool announced that they would play two friendlies as part of their pre-season training camp in Austria. On 2 September 2020, they announced that they would complete their pre-season campaign with a home game against Blackpool.

22 August 2020 Friendly	Liverpool	3–0	VfB Stuttgart	Kitzbühel, Austria
17:00 BST	Firmino 15'; Gomez (yellow card) 30'; Keïta 40'; Brewster 68'	Report		Stadium: Sportplatz Langau; Referee: Christopher Jäger (Austria)

25 August 2020 Friendly	Red Bull Salzburg	2–2	Liverpool	Wals-Siezenheim, Austria
15:00 BST	Daka 3', 13', (yellow card) 45'; Onguéné (yellow card) 26'	Report	Brewster 72', 81'	Stadium: Stadion Wals-Siezenheim; Referee: Dieter Muckenhammer (Austria)

5 September 2020 Friendly	Liverpool	7–2	Blackpool	Liverpool, England
15:00 BST	Matip 43'; Mané 52'; Firmino 54'; Elliott 69'; Minamino 71'; Origi 85'; Van den Berg 88'	Report	Hamilton 15'; Yates 33' (pen.)	Stadium: Anfield

== Competitions ==
=== Overview ===
Competition	First match	Last match	Starting round	Final position	Record							
Competition	First match	Last match	Starting round	Final position	Pld	W	D	L	GF	GA	GD	Win %
Premier League	12 September 2020	23 May 2021	Matchday 1	3rd	38	20	9	9	68	42	+26	52.63
FA Cup	8 January 2021	24 January 2021	Third round	Fourth round	2	1	0	1	6	4	+2	50.00
EFL Cup	24 September 2020	1 October 2020	Third round	Fourth round	2	1	1	0	7	2	+5	50.00
UEFA Champions League	21 October 2020	14 April 2021	Group stage	Quarter-finals	10	6	2	2	15	6	+9	60.00
FA Community Shield	29 August 2020		Final	Runners-up	1	0	1	0	1	1	+0	0.00
Total					53	28	13	12	97	55	+42	52.83

Source: Soccerway

=== Premier League ===
==== League table ====
Pos	Team	Pld	W	D	L	GF	GA	GD	Pts	Qualification or relegation
1	Manchester City (C)	38	27	5	6	83	32	+51	86	Qualification for the Champions League group stage
2	Manchester United	38	21	11	6	73	44	+29	74	Qualification for the Champions League group stage
3	Liverpool	38	20	9	9	68	42	+26	69	Qualification for the Champions League group stage
4	Chelsea	38	19	10	9	58	36	+22	67	Qualification for the Champions League group stage
5	Leicester City	38	20	6	12	68	50	+18	66	Qualification for the Europa League group stage (Note: Since the winners of the 2020–21 FA Cup, Leicester City, also qualified for the Europa League based on league position, the second Europa League group stage berth allocated to England was transferred to the sixth-placed team.)

Source: Premier League
Rules for classification: 1) Points; 2) Goal difference; 3) Goals scored; 4) If the champions, relegated teams or qualified teams for UEFA competitions cannot be determined by rules 1 to 3, rules 4.1 to 4.3 are applied – 4.1) Points gained in head-to-head record between such teams; 4.2) Away goals scored in head-to-head record between such teams; 4.3) Play-offs
(C) Champions

==== Results summary ====
Overall								Home						Away					
Pld	W	D	L	GF	GA	GD	Pts	W	D	L	GF	GA	GD	W	D	L	GF	GA	GD
38	20	9	9	68	42	+26	69	10	3	6	29	20	+9	10	6	3	39	22	+17

Source: Soccerway

==== Results by matchday ====
Matchday	1	2	3	4	5	6	7	8	9	10	11	12	13	14	15	16	17	18	19	20	21	22	23	24	25	26	27	28	29	30	31	32	33	34	35	36	37	38
Ground	H	A	H	A	A	H	H	A	H	A	H	A	H	A	H	A	A	H	H	A	A	H	H	A	H	A	H	H	A	A	H	A	H	H	A	A	A	H
Result	W	W	W	L	D	W	W	D	W	D	W	D	W	W	D	D	L	D	L	W	W	L	L	L	L	W	L	L	W	W	W	D	D	W	W	W	W	W
Position	6	4	2	5	3	2	1	3	2	2	2	2	1	1	1	1	2	4	4	4	3	4	4	6	6	6	7	8	6	7	6	6	6	7	5	5	4	3

Source: Premier League
A = Away; H = Home; W = Win; D = Draw; L = Loss

==== Matches ====
The league fixtures were announced on 20 August 2020.

12 September 2020 1	Liverpool	4–3	Leeds United	Liverpool
17:30 BST (UTC+1)	Salah 4' (pen.), 33', 88' (pen.); Van Dijk 20'; Firmino (yellow card) 76'	Report	Harrison 12'; Bamford 30'; Klich 66'	Stadium: Anfield; Attendance: 0 Referee: Michael Oliver

20 September 2020 2	Chelsea	0–2	Liverpool	Fulham, London
16:30 BST (UTC+1)	Christensen (red card) 45+1'; Jorginho (penalty missed) 75'	Report	Mané 50', 54'	Stadium: Stamford Bridge; Attendance: 0 Referee: Paul Tierney

28 September 2020 3	Liverpool	3–1	Arsenal	Liverpool
20:00 BST (UTC+1)	Mané (yellow card) 3', (goal) 28'; Robertson 34'; Alexander-Arnold (yellow card) 49'; Jota 88'	Report	Lacazette 25'; Bellerín (yellow card) 68'; Ceballos (yellow card) 72'	Stadium: Anfield; Attendance: 0 Referee: Craig Pawson

4 October 2020 4	Aston Villa	7–2	Liverpool	Aston, Birmingham
19:15 BST (UTC+1)	Watkins 4', 22', 39'; McGinn 35'; Douglas Luiz (yellow card) 46'; Barkley 55'; Grealish 66', 75'; Nakamba (yellow card) 90+2'	Report	Salah 33', 60'; Van Dijk (yellow card) 38'	Stadium: Villa Park; Attendance: 0 Referee: Martin Atkinson

17 October 2020 5	Everton	2–2	Liverpool	Walton, Liverpool
12:30 BST (UTC+1)	Keane 19'; Rodríguez (yellow card) 45'; Gomes (yellow card) 69'; Calvert-Lewin 81'; Allan (yellow card) 84'; Richarlison (red card) 90'	Report	Mané 3', (yellow card) 67'; Salah 72'; Fabinho (yellow card) 84'	Stadium: Goodison Park; Attendance: 0 Referee: Michael Oliver

24 October 2020 6	Liverpool	2–1	Sheffield United	Liverpool
20:00 BST (UTC+1)	Firmino 41'; Jota 64'	Report	Lundstram (yellow card) 3'; Berge 13' (pen.), (yellow card) 86'; Stevens (yellow card) 66'	Stadium: Anfield; Attendance: 0 Referee: Mike Dean

31 October 2020 7	Liverpool	2–1	West Ham United	Liverpool
17:30 GMT (UTC±0)	Salah 42' (pen.); Jota 85'	Report	Fornals 10'; Rice (yellow card) 49'	Stadium: Anfield; Attendance: 0 Referee: Kevin Friend

8 November 2020 8	Manchester City	1–1	Liverpool	Manchester
16:30 GMT (UTC±0)	Gabriel Jesus 31'; De Bruyne (penalty missed) 42'; Sterling (yellow card) 61'; Laporte (yellow card) 79'; Walker (yellow card) 90+3'	Report	Salah 13' (pen.); Matip (yellow card) 46'	Stadium: City of Manchester Stadium; Attendance: 0 Referee: Craig Pawson

22 November 2020 9	Liverpool	3–0	Leicester City	Liverpool
19:15 GMT (UTC±0)	Evans 21' (o.g.); Jota 41'; Firmino 86'	Report	Justin (yellow card) 45'; Mendy (yellow card) 66'	Stadium: Anfield; Attendance: 0 Referee: Chris Kavanagh

28 November 2020 10	Brighton & Hove Albion	1–1	Liverpool	Falmer
12:30 GMT (UTC±0)	Maupay (penalty missed) 20'; Veltman (yellow card) 45+1'; White (yellow card) 83'; Groß 90+2' (pen.)	Report	Jota 60'; Alisson (yellow card) 90+3'	Stadium: Falmer Stadium; Attendance: 0 Referee: Stuart Attwell

6 December 2020 11	Liverpool	4–0	Wolverhampton Wanderers	Liverpool
19:15 GMT (UTC±0)	N. Williams (yellow card) 3'; Salah 24'; Wijnaldum 58'; Matip 67'; Semedo 78' (o.g.)	Report	Moutinho (yellow card) 89'	Stadium: Anfield; Attendance: 2,000; Referee: Craig Pawson

13 December 2020 12	Fulham	1–1	Liverpool	Fulham, London
16:30 GMT (UTC±0)	Andersen (yellow card) 20'; Decordova-Reid 25'; Lemina (yellow card) 46'; Lookman (yellow card) 75'	Report	Jones (yellow card) 31'; Salah 79' (pen.)	Stadium: Craven Cottage; Attendance: 2,000; Referee: Andre Marriner

16 December 2020 13	Liverpool	2–1	Tottenham Hotspur	Liverpool
20:00 GMT (UTC±0)	Salah 26'; Firmino 90'	Report	Son 33'; Lo Celso (yellow card) 48'; Højbjerg (yellow card) 54'	Stadium: Anfield; Attendance: 2,000; Referee: Anthony Taylor

19 December 2020 14	Crystal Palace	0–7	Liverpool	Selhurst, London
12:30 GMT (UTC±0)	Clyne (yellow card) 45+1'	Report	Minamino 3'; Mané 35'; Firmino 44', 68'; Henderson 52'; Salah 81', 84'	Stadium: Selhurst Park; Attendance: 0 Referee: Jon Moss

27 December 2020 15	Liverpool	1–1	West Bromwich Albion	Liverpool
16:30 GMT (UTC±0)	Mané 12'	Report	O'Shea (yellow card) 56'; Ajayi 82'	Stadium: Anfield; Attendance: 2,000; Referee: Kevin Friend
Note: Liverpool manager Jürgen Klopp was cautioned (yellow card) in the 61st minute.

30 December 2020 16	Newcastle United	0–0	Liverpool	Newcastle upon Tyne
20:00 GMT (UTC±0)	Clark (yellow card) 12'; Hayden (yellow card) 85'	Report	Fabinho (yellow card) 49'; Milner (yellow card) 65'; Phillips (yellow card) 78'	Stadium: St James' Park; Attendance: 0 Referee: Paul Tierney

4 January 2021 17	Southampton	1–0	Liverpool	Southampton
20:00 GMT (UTC±0)	Ings 2'; Bertrand (yellow card) 90+3'	Report	Thiago (yellow card) 3'; Robertson (yellow card) 15'; Shaqiri (yellow card) 79'	Stadium: St Mary's Stadium; Attendance: 0 Referee: Andre Marriner

17 January 2021 18	Liverpool	0–0	Manchester United	Liverpool
16:30 GMT (UTC±0)	Shaqiri (yellow card) 33'; Fabinho (yellow card) 66'	Report	Rashford (yellow card) 90+4'	Stadium: Anfield; Attendance: 0 Referee: Paul Tierney

21 January 2021 19	Liverpool	0–1	Burnley	Liverpool
20:00 GMT (UTC±0)	Fabinho (yellow card) 45+2'; Matip (yellow card) 87'	Report	Barnes (yellow card) 39', (goal) 83' (pen.)	Stadium: Anfield; Attendance: 0 Referee: Mike Dean

28 January 2021 20	Tottenham Hotspur	1–3	Liverpool	Tottenham, London
20:00 GMT (UTC±0)	Bergwijn (yellow card) 30'; Højbjerg 49'	Report	Thiago (yellow card) 24'; Firmino 45+4'; Alexander-Arnold 47'; Phillips (yellow card) 50'; Mané 65'	Stadium: Tottenham Hotspur Stadium; Attendance: 0 Referee: Martin Atkinson

31 January 2021 21	West Ham United	1–3	Liverpool	Stratford, London
16:30 GMT (UTC±0)	Rice (yellow card) 47'; Souček (yellow card) 49'; Dawson 87'	Report	Salah 57', 68'; Wijnaldum 84'	Stadium: London Stadium; Attendance: 0 Referee: Jon Moss

3 February 2021 22	Liverpool	0–1	Brighton & Hove Albion	Liverpool
20:15 GMT (UTC±0)	Wijnaldum (yellow card) 45'	Report	Alzate 56'	Stadium: Anfield; Attendance: 0 Referee: Kevin Friend

7 February 2021 23	Liverpool	1–4	Manchester City	Liverpool
16:30 GMT (UTC±0)	Thiago (yellow card) 3'; Salah 63' (pen.); Fabinho (yellow card) 70'	Report	Gündoğan (penalty missed) 37', 49', 73'; Dias (yellow card) 62'; Sterling 76'; Foden 83'	Stadium: Anfield; Attendance: 0 Referee: Michael Oliver

13 February 2021 24	Leicester City	3–1	Liverpool	Leicester
12:30 GMT (UTC±0)	Evans (yellow card) 43'; Maddison 78'; Vardy 81'; Barnes 85'	Report	Jones (yellow card) 24'; Salah 67'; Kabak (yellow card) 71'	Stadium: King Power Stadium; Attendance: 0 Referee: Anthony Taylor

20 February 2021 25	Liverpool	0–2	Everton	Liverpool
17:30 GMT (UTC±0)	Kabak (yellow card) 45+1'; Mané (yellow card) 67'	Report	Richarlison 3'; Gomes (yellow card) 41'; Sigurðsson 83' (pen.)	Stadium: Anfield; Attendance: 0 Referee: Chris Kavanagh

28 February 2021 26	Sheffield United	0–2	Liverpool	Sheffield
19:15 GMT (UTC±0)		Report	Jones 48'; Bryan 64' (o.g.)	Stadium: Bramall Lane; Attendance: 0 Referee: Jon Moss

4 March 2021 27	Liverpool	0–1	Chelsea	Liverpool
20:15 GMT (UTC±0)		Report	Mount 42'	Stadium: Anfield; Attendance: 0 Referee: Martin Atkinson

7 March 2021 28	Liverpool	0–1	Fulham	Liverpool
14:00 GMT (UTC±0)	Jota (yellow card) 42'; Keïta (yellow card) 90+3'	Report	Tete (yellow card) 38'; Lemina 45', (yellow card) 47'; Mitrović (yellow card) 90+6'	Stadium: Anfield; Attendance: 0 Referee: Kevin Friend

15 March 2021 29	Wolverhampton Wanderers	0–1	Liverpool	Wolverhampton
20:00 GMT (UTC±0)	Neves (yellow card) 37'; Saïss (yellow card) 52'	Report	Thiago (yellow card) 42'; Jota 45+2'	Stadium: Molineux; Attendance: 0 Referee: Craig Pawson

3 April 2021 30	Arsenal	0–3	Liverpool	Holloway, London
20:00 BST (UTC+1)	Gabriel (yellow card) 90+1'	Report	Jota 64', 82', (yellow card) 73'; Salah 68'	Stadium: Emirates Stadium; Attendance: 0 Referee: Stuart Attwell

10 April 2021 31	Liverpool	2–1	Aston Villa	Liverpool
15:00 BST (UTC+1)	Salah 57'; Milner (yellow card) 65'; Robertson (yellow card) 74'; Alexander-Arnold 90+1'	Report	Konsa (yellow card) 25'; Watkins 43', (yellow card) 85'; Douglas Luiz (yellow card) 49'; Targett (yellow card) 73'	Stadium: Anfield; Attendance: 0 Referee: Paul Tierney

19 April 2021 32	Leeds United	1–1	Liverpool	Leeds
20:00 BST (UTC+1)	Dallas (yellow card) 25'; Alioski (yellow card) 37'; Llorente 87'	Report	Mané 31'; Firmino (yellow card) 39'	Stadium: Elland Road; Attendance: 0 Referee: Anthony Taylor

24 April 2021 33	Liverpool	1–1	Newcastle United	Liverpool
12:30 BST (UTC+1)	Salah 3'; Kabak (yellow card) 9'; Fabinho (yellow card) 89'	Report	Fernández (yellow card) 16'; Willock 90+5'	Stadium: Anfield; Attendance: 0 Referee: Andre Marriner

8 May 2021 35	Liverpool	2–0	Southampton	Liverpool
20:15 BST (UTC+1)	Mané 31'; Thiago 90'	Report	Redmond (yellow card) 61'	Stadium: Anfield; Attendance: 0 Referee: Kevin Friend

13 May 2021 34	Manchester United	2–4	Liverpool	Manchester
20:15 BST (UTC+1)	Fernandes 10'; Bailly (yellow card) 48'; Rashford 68'; McTominay (yellow card) 79'; Cavani (yellow card) 85'	Report	Jota 34'; Firmino 45+3', 47'; Salah 90'	Stadium: Old Trafford; Attendance: 0 Referee: Anthony Taylor
Note: The match was originally scheduled for 2 May 2021 but was postponed after a supporters' protest occurred at Old Trafford.

16 May 2021 36	West Bromwich Albion	1–2	Liverpool	West Bromwich
16:30 BST (UTC+1)	Robson-Kanu 15'	Report	Salah 33'; Alisson 90+5'	Stadium: The Hawthorns; Attendance: 0 Referee: Mike Dean

19 May 2021 37	Burnley	0–3	Liverpool	Burnley
20:15 BST (UTC+1)		Report	Firmino 43'; Phillips 52'; Oxlade-Chamberlain 88'	Stadium: Turf Moor; Attendance: 6,500; Referee: Chris Kavanagh

23 May 2021 38	Liverpool	2–0	Crystal Palace	Liverpool
16:00 BST (UTC+1)	Mané 36', 74'; Alexander-Arnold (yellow card) 71'; Milner (yellow card) 86'	Report	Ayew (yellow card) 71'; Riedewald (yellow card) 83'	Stadium: Anfield; Attendance: 10,000; Referee: Craig Pawson

=== FA Cup ===
Liverpool entered the competition in the third round. The draw was confirmed on 30 November 2020 live on BT Sport. The draw for the fourth and fifth round were made on 11 January 2021, conducted by former Liverpool player Peter Crouch.

8 January 2021 Third round	Aston Villa	1–4	Liverpool	Birmingham
19:45 GMT	Barry 41'	Report	Mané 4', 63'; Jones (yellow card) 44'; Wijnaldum 60'; Salah 65'	Stadium: Villa Park; Attendance: 0 Referee: Craig Pawson

24 January 2021 Fourth round	Manchester United	3–2	Liverpool	Trafford
17:00 GMT	Greenwood 26'; Rashford 48'; Fernandes 78'; Lindelöf (yellow card) 89'; Pogba (yellow card) 90+2'	Report	Salah 18', 58'; Fabinho (yellow card) 42'; Mané (yellow card) 69'	Stadium: Old Trafford; Attendance: 0 Referee: Craig Pawson

=== EFL Cup ===
Liverpool entered the competition in the third round. The draw was confirmed on 6 September 2020 live on Sky Sports. The fourth round draw was conducted on 17 September 2020, also live on Sky Sports.

24 September 2020 Third round	Lincoln City	2–7	Liverpool	Lincoln
19:45 BST	Edun 60'; Montsma 66'; Eyoma (yellow card) 69'	Report	Shaqiri 9'; Minamino 18', 46'; Jones 32', 36'; Grujić 65'; Origi 89'	Stadium: Sincil Bank; Attendance: 0 Referee: Tony Harrington

1 October 2020 Fourth round	Liverpool	0–0 (4–5 p)	Arsenal	Liverpool
19:45 BST	Minamino (yellow card) 15'; Wilson (yellow card) 75'	Report	Xhaka (yellow card) 51'; Cédric (yellow card) 90+2'	Stadium: Anfield; Attendance: 0 Referee: Kevin Friend
	Penalties
	Milner (penalty scored); Wijnaldum (penalty scored); Minamino (penalty scored); Origi (penalty missed); Jones (penalty scored); Wilson (penalty missed)		(penalty scored) Lacazette; (penalty scored) Cédric; (penalty missed) Elneny; (penalty scored) Maitland-Niles; (penalty scored) Pépé; (penalty scored) Willock

=== FA Community Shield ===
29 August 2020 Final	Arsenal	1–1 (5–4 p)	Liverpool	Wembley
16:30 BST (UTC+1)	Aubameyang 12'	Report	Milner (yellow card) 57'; Minamino 73'	Stadium: Wembley Stadium; Attendance: 0 Referee: Andre Marriner
	Penalties
	Nelson (penalty scored); Maitland-Niles (penalty scored); Cédric (penalty scored); David Luiz (penalty scored); Aubameyang (penalty scored)		(penalty scored) Salah; (penalty scored) Fabinho; (penalty missed) Brewster; (penalty scored) Minamino; (penalty scored) Jones

=== UEFA Champions League ===
Liverpool entered the competition in the group stage.

==== Group stage ====
The draw for the group stage was held on 1 October 2020.

Pos	Team	Pld	W	D	L	GF	GA	GD	Pts	Qualification	LIV	ATA	AJX	MID
1	(England) Liverpool	6	4	1	1	10	3	+7	13	Advance to knockout phase	—	0–2	1–0	2–0
2	(Italy) Atalanta	6	3	2	1	10	8	+2	11	Advance to knockout phase	0–5	—	2–2	1–1
3	(Netherlands) Ajax	6	2	1	3	7	7	0	7	Transfer to Europa League	0–1	0–1	—	3–1
4	(Denmark) Midtjylland	6	0	2	4	4	13	−9	2		1–1	0–4	1–2	—

Source: UEFA
Rules for classification: Group stage tiebreakers

21 October 2020 1	Ajax (Netherlands)	0–1	(England) Liverpool	Amsterdam, Netherlands
21:00 CEST (UTC+2)	Promes (yellow card) 90+3'	Report	Tagliafico 35' (o.g.); Milner (yellow card) 38'; Alexander-Arnold (yellow card) 80'	Stadium: Johan Cruyff Arena; Attendance: 0 Referee: Felix Brych (Germany)

27 October 2020 2	Liverpool (England)	2–0	(Denmark) Midtjylland	Liverpool, England
21:00 CET (UTC+1)	Milner (yellow card) 41'; Jota 55'; Salah 90+3' (pen.)	Report	Scholz (yellow card) 19'; Onyeka (yellow card) 25'; Cajuste (yellow card) 32'; Paulinho (yellow card) 90+1'	Stadium: Anfield; Attendance: 0 Referee: Paweł Raczkowski (Poland)

3 November 2020 3	Atalanta (Italy)	0–5	(England) Liverpool	Bergamo, Italy
21:00 CET (UTC+1)		Report	Jota 16', 33', 54'; Wijnaldum (yellow card) 21'; Jones (yellow card) 21'; Salah 47'; Mané 49'	Stadium: Stadio Atleti Azzurri d'Italia; Attendance: 0 Referee: Ovidiu Hațegan (Romania)
Note: Liverpool manager Jürgen Klopp was cautioned (yellow card) in the 73rd minute.

25 November 2020 4	Liverpool (England)	0–2	(Italy) Atalanta	Liverpool, England
21:00 CET (UTC+1)	Tsimikas (yellow card) 58'	Report	Iličić 60'; Gosens 64'; De Roon (yellow card) 89'	Stadium: Anfield; Attendance: 0 Referee: Carlos del Cerro Grande (Spain)

1 December 2020 5	Liverpool (England)	1–0	(Netherlands) Ajax	Liverpool, England
21:00 CET (UTC+1)	Jones 58'; Wijnaldum (yellow card) 70'; Henderson (yellow card) 90+1'; Mané (yellow card) 90+3'	Report	Schuurs (yellow card) 42'; Blind (yellow card) 55'	Stadium: Anfield; Attendance: 0 Referee: Tobias Stieler (Germany)

9 December 2020 6	Midtjylland (Denmark)	1–1	(England) Liverpool	Herning, Denmark
18:55 CET (UTC+1)	Onyeka (yellow card) 9'; Cools (yellow card) 31'; Scholz 62' (pen.); Anderson (yellow card) 81'	Report	Salah 1'; Kelleher (yellow card) 61'	Stadium: MCH Arena; Attendance: 0 Referee: François Letexier (France)

==== Knockout phase ====
===== Round of 16 =====
The draw for the round of 16 was held on 14 December 2020.

16 February 2021 First leg	RB Leipzig (Germany)	0–2	(England) Liverpool	Budapest, Hungary
21:00 CET (UTC+1)	Haidara (yellow card) 5'; Mukiele (yellow card) 5'; Nkunku (yellow card) 52'; Angeliño (yellow card) 65'; Olmo (yellow card) 76'	Report	Salah 53'; Mané 58'; Kabak (yellow card) 69'; Henderson (yellow card) 81'	Stadium: Puskás Aréna; Attendance: 0 Referee: Slavko Vinčić (Slovenia)
Note: The match, originally to be played at the Red Bull Arena in Leipzig, was moved to the Puskás Aréna in Budapest, due to travel restrictions related to the COVID-19 pandemic imposed by Germany on travellers from the United Kingdom.

10 March 2021 Second leg	Liverpool (England)	2–0 (4–0 agg.)	(Germany) RB Leipzig	Budapest, Hungary
21:00 CET (UTC+1)	Salah 71'; Mané 74'	Report		Stadium: Puskás Aréna; Attendance: 0 Referee: Clément Turpin (France)
Note: The match, originally to be played at Anfield in Liverpool, was moved to the Puskás Aréna in Budapest, due to travel restrictions related to the COVID-19 pandemic imposed by Germany on travellers from the United Kingdom (which would have affected RB Leipzig players and staff upon return).

===== Quarter-finals =====
The draw for the quarter-finals was held on 19 March 2021.

6 April 2021 First leg	Real Madrid (Spain)	3–1	(England) Liverpool	Madrid, Spain
21:00 CEST (UTC+2)	Vinícius 27', 65'; Asensio 36'; Vázquez (yellow card) 49'	Report	Mané (yellow card) 39'; Salah 51'; Thiago (yellow card) 56'; Alexander-Arnold (yellow card) 83'	Stadium: Alfredo Di Stéfano; Attendance: 0 Referee: Felix Brych (Germany)
Note: Real Madrid played their home match at Alfredo Di Stéfano, Madrid, instead of their regular stadium Santiago Bernabéu, Madrid.

14 April 2021 Second leg	Liverpool (England)	0–0 (1–3 agg.)	(Spain) Real Madrid	Liverpool, England
20:00 BST (UTC+1)	Robertson (yellow card) 25'; Phillips (yellow card) 59'	Report	Casemiro (yellow card) 25'	Stadium: Anfield; Attendance: 0 Referee: Björn Kuipers (Netherlands)

== Squad statistics ==
=== Appearances ===
Players with no appearances are not included on the list.

No.	Pos.	Nat.	Player	Premier League		FA Cup		EFL Cup		Champions League		Community Shield		Total	
No.	Pos.	Nat.	Player	Apps	Starts	Apps	Starts	Apps	Starts	Apps	Starts	Apps	Starts	Apps	Starts
1	GK	(Brazil)	Alisson	33	33	1	1	0	0	7	7	1	1	42	42
3	MF	(Brazil)	Fabinho	30	28	2	2	1	0	8	7	1	1	42	38
4	DF	(Netherlands)	Virgil van Dijk	5	5	0	0	2	2	0	0	1	1	8	8
5	MF	(Netherlands)	Georginio Wijnaldum	38	34	2	2	1	0	9	8	1	1	51	45
6	MF	(Spain)	Thiago	24	20	2	1	0	0	4	2	0	0	30	23
7	MF	(England)	James Milner	26	11	2	2	1	1	6	4	1	1	36	19
8	MF	(Guinea)	Naby Keïta	10	7	0	0	1	0	4	2	1	0	16	9
9	FW	(Brazil)	Roberto Firmino	36	33	2	1	0	0	9	3	1	1	48	38
10	FW	(Senegal)	Sadio Mané	35	31	2	1	0	0	10	8	1	1	48	41
11	FW	(Egypt)	Mohamed Salah	37	34	2	2	1	1	10	9	1	1	51	47
12	DF	(England)	Joe Gomez	7	6	0	0	1	0	3	3	1	1	12	10
13	GK	(Spain)	Adrián	3	3	0	0	2	2	1	1	0	0	6	6
14	MF	(England)	Jordan Henderson	21	20	1	1	0	0	6	4	0	0	28	25
15	MF	(England)	Alex Oxlade-Chamberlain	13	2	1	0	0	0	3	0	0	0	17	2
17	MF	(England)	Curtis Jones	24	13	2	2	2	2	5	5	1	0	34	22
19	DF	(Turkey)	Ozan Kabak	9	9	0	0	0	0	4	4	0	0	13	13
20	FW	(Portugal)	Diogo Jota	19	12	0	0	2	1	9	6	0	0	30	19
21	DF	(Greece)	Kostas Tsimikas	2	0	0	0	1	1	4	2	0	0	7	3
23	MF	(Switzerland)	Xherdan Shaqiri	14	5	2	0	1	1	5	1	0	0	22	7
26	DF	(Scotland)	Andrew Robertson	38	38	1	1	0	0	10	8	1	1	50	48
27	FW	(Belgium)	Divock Origi	9	2	2	0	2	1	4	3	0	0	17	6
32	DF	(Cameroon)	Joël Matip	10	9	0	0	0	0	2	2	0	0	12	11
46	DF	(England)	Rhys Williams	9	7	2	2	2	2	6	3	0	0	19	14
47	DF	(England)	Nat Phillips	17	15	0	0	0	0	3	3	0	0	20	18
62	GK	(Republic of Ireland)	Caoimhín Kelleher	2	2	1	1	0	0	2	2	0	0	5	5
65	MF	(England)	Leighton Clarkson	0	0	0	0	0	0	1	1	0	0	1	1
66	DF	(England)	Trent Alexander-Arnold	36	34	1	1	0	0	8	8	0	0	45	43
76	DF	(Wales)	Neco Williams	6	3	1	1	2	2	4	2	1	1	14	9
89	DF	(France)	Billy Koumetio	0	0	0	0	0	0	1	0	0	0	1	0
Players who went out on loan or left permanently but made appearances for Liverpool prior to departing
16	MF	(Serbia)	Marko Grujić	0	0	0	0	2	2	0	0	0	0	2	2
18	FW	(Japan)	Takumi Minamino	9	2	1	1	2	2	4	2	1	0	17	7
24	FW	(England)	Rhian Brewster	0	0	0	0	0	0	0	0	1	0	1	0
59	MF	(Wales)	Harry Wilson	0	0	0	0	1	1	0	0	0	0	1	1
67	MF	(England)	Harvey Elliott	0	0	0	0	1	1	0	0	0	0	1	1
Total				38		2		2		10		1		53	

=== Goals ===
Rank	Pos.	No.	Player	Premier League	FA Cup	EFL Cup	Champions League	Community Shield	Total
1	FW	11	(Egypt) Mohamed Salah	22	3	0	6	0	31
2	FW	10	(Senegal) Sadio Mané	11	2	0	3	0	16
3	FW	20	(Portugal) Diogo Jota	9	0	0	4	0	13
4	FW	9	(Brazil) Roberto Firmino	9	0	0	0	0	9
5	MF	17	(England) Curtis Jones	1	0	2	1	0	4
5	FW	18	(Japan) Takumi Minamino (Note: Players who left Liverpool on loan during the season)	1	0	2	0	1	4
7	MF	5	(Netherlands) Georginio Wijnaldum	2	1	0	0	0	3
8	DF	66	(England) Trent Alexander-Arnold	2	0	0	0	0	2
9	GK	1	(Brazil) Alisson Becker	1	0	0	0	0	1
9	DF	4	(Netherlands) Virgil van Dijk	1	0	0	0	0	1
9	MF	6	(Spain) Thiago	1	0	0	0	0	1
9	MF	14	(England) Jordan Henderson	1	0	0	0	0	1
9	MF	15	(England) Alex Oxlade-Chamberlain	1	0	0	0	0	1
9	MF	16	(Serbia) Marko Grujić	0	0	1	0	0	1
9	MF	23	(Switzerland) Xherdan Shaqiri	0	0	1	0	0	1
9	DF	26	(Scotland) Andy Robertson	1	0	0	0	0	1
9	FW	27	(Belgium) Divock Origi	0	0	1	0	0	1
9	DF	32	(Cameroon) Joël Matip	1	0	0	0	0	1
9	DF	47	(England) Nat Phillips	1	0	0	0	0	1
Own goals				3	0	0	1	0	4
Total				68	6	7	15	1	97

=== Clean sheets ===
No.	Player	Premier League	FA Cup	EFL Cup	Champions League	Community Shield	Total
1	(Brazil) Alisson Becker	10	0	0	5	0	15
13	(Spain) Adrián	1	0	1	1	0	3
62	(Republic of Ireland) Caoimhín Kelleher	1	0	0	1	0	2
Total		12	0	1	7	0	20

=== Disciplinary record ===
No.	Pos.	Name	Premier League		FA Cup		EFL Cup		Champions League		Community Shield		Total	
No.	Pos.	Name	Yellow card	Red card	Yellow card	Red card	Yellow card	Red card	Yellow card	Red card	Yellow card	Red card	Yellow card	Red card
1	GK	(Brazil) Alisson Becker	1	0	0	0	0	0	0	0	0	0	1	0
3	MF	(Brazil) Fabinho	6	0	1	0	0	0	0	0	0	0	7	0
4	DF	(Netherlands) Virgil van Dijk	1	0	0	0	0	0	0	0	0	0	1	0
5	MF	(Netherlands) Georginio Wijnaldum	1	0	0	0	0	0	2	0	0	0	3	0
6	MF	(Spain) Thiago	4	0	0	0	0	0	1	0	0	0	5	0
7	MF	(England) James Milner	3	0	0	0	0	0	2	0	1	0	6	0
8	MF	(Guinea) Naby Keïta	1	0	0	0	0	0	0	0	0	0	1	0
9	FW	(Brazil) Roberto Firmino	2	0	0	0	0	0	0	0	0	0	2	0
10	FW	(Senegal) Sadio Mané	3	0	1	0	0	0	2	0	0	0	6	0
14	MF	(England) Jordan Henderson	0	0	0	0	0	0	2	0	0	0	2	0
17	MF	(England) Curtis Jones	2	0	1	0	0	0	1	0	0	0	4	0
18	FW	(Japan) Takumi Minamino (Note: Players who left Liverpool on loan during the season)	0	0	0	0	1	0	0	0	0	0	1	0
19	DF	(Turkey) Ozan Kabak	3	0	0	0	0	0	1	0	0	0	4	0
20	FW	(Portugal) Diogo Jota	2	0	0	0	0	0	0	0	0	0	2	0
21	DF	(Greece) Kostas Tsimikas	0	0	0	0	0	0	1	0	0	0	1	0
23	MF	(Switzerland) Xherdan Shaqiri	2	0	0	0	0	0	0	0	0	0	2	0
26	DF	(Scotland) Andy Robertson	2	0	0	0	0	0	1	0	0	0	3	0
32	DF	(Cameroon) Joël Matip	2	0	0	0	0	0	0	0	0	0	2	0
47	DF	(England) Nat Phillips	2	0	0	0	0	0	1	0	0	0	3	0
59	MF	(Wales) Harry Wilson	0	0	0	0	1	0	0	0	0	0	1	0
62	GK	(Republic of Ireland) Caoimhín Kelleher	0	0	0	0	0	0	1	0	0	0	1	0
66	DF	(England) Trent Alexander-Arnold	2	0	0	0	0	0	2	0	0	0	4	0
76	DF	(Wales) Neco Williams	1	0	0	0	0	0	0	0	0	0	1	0
Total			40	0	3	0	2	0	17	0	1	0	63	0

== Club awards ==
=== End-of-season awards ===
- Standard Chartered Men's Player of the Season: Mohamed Salah
- Goal of the Season: Alisson Becker (vs West Brom, 16 May 2021)

=== Liverpool Standard Chartered Player of the Month award ===
Awarded monthly to the player that was chosen by fans voting on Liverpoolfc.com

Month	Player	Ref
September	(Senegal) Sadio Mané	
October	(Portugal) Diogo Jota	
November	(Portugal) Diogo Jota	
December	(Egypt) Mohamed Salah	
January	(Egypt) Mohamed Salah	
February	(Egypt) Mohamed Salah	
March	(England) Nat Phillips	
April	(England) Trent Alexander-Arnold	
