= 1973–74 FA Trophy =

FA Challenge Trophy

Tournament details
- Country: England; Wales
- Teams: 200

Final positions
- Champions: Morecambe (1st title)
- Runners-up: Dartford

The 1973–74 FA Trophy was the fifth season of the FA Trophy.

== Preliminary round ==
=== Ties ===
Tie	Home team	Score	Away team
1	Cinderford Town	3-0	Gloucester City
2	Cowes	1-3	Bognor Regis Town
3	Fleetwood	1-3	Netherfield
4	Guildford City	2-1	Andover
5	Hednesford Town	1-0	Brereton Social
6	Retford Town	1-0	Goole Town
7	Soham Town Rangers	1-2	Wisbech Town
8	Weston-Super-Mere	2-1	Glastonbury

== First qualifying round ==
=== Ties ===
Tie	Home team	Score	Away team
1	A P Leamington	1-1	Heanor Town
2	Accrington Stanley	4-2	Netherfield
3	Alfreton Town	6-1	Spalding United
4	Ashton United	1-2	Hyde United
5	Barnstaple Town	1-1	Bridgend Town
6	Barton Town	2-3	Bridlington Trinity
7	Basingstoke Town	1-1	Salisbury
8	Bath City	2-1	Cinderford Town
9	Bethesda Athletic	0-1	Nantlle Vale
10	Blaenau Ffestiniog	2-2	Rhyl
11	Bletchley	3-1	Bury Town
12	Boston	2-1	Louth United
13	Bourne Town	3-1	Holbeach United
14	Brierley Hill Alliance	2-0	Halesowen Town
15	Caernarfon Town	1-4	Pwllheli & District
16	Congleton Town	1-2	Formby
17	Crawley Town	2-1	Bognor Regis Town
18	Darwen	1-1	Rossendale United
19	Droylsden	2-2	Clitheroe
20	Eastwood Hanley	0-2	Leek Town
21	Ellesmere Port Town	0-2	Connah's Quay Nomads
22	Ely City	1-1	Skegness Town
23	Enderby Town	0-1	Darlaston
24	Falmouth Town	2-0	Ton Pentre
25	Ferndale Athletic	0-0	Weston-super-Mare
26	Folkestone	2-0	Ramsgate
27	Frickley Colliery	3-0	Retford Town
28	Frome Town	0-1	Trowbridge Town
29	Glossop	0-1	Woolley Miners Welfare
30	Gornal Athletic	0-1	Dudley Town
31	Gresley Rovers	1-2	Belper Town
32	Hatfield Main	3-1	Boldon Colliery Welfare
33	Hinckley Athletic	0-3	Bedworth United
34	Histon	1-1	Sudbury Town
35	Horden Colliery Welfare	W/O	Gateshead
36	Horwich R M I	0-2	Skelmersdale United
37	Kimberley Town	1-0	Eastwood Town
38	Long Eaton United	1-0	Desborough Town
39	Lowestoft Town	2-0	Wisbech Town
40	Lye Town	2-1	Hednesford
41	Maidstone United	3-1	Deal Town
42	Metropolitan Police	1-3	Gravesend & Northfleet
43	Nantwich Town	2-1	Winsford United
44	Nelson	1-4	Worksop Town
45	New Mills	1-1	New Brighton
46	Oswestry Town	1-1	Portmadoc
47	Poole Town	2-3	Guildford City
48	Radcliffe Borough	0-0	Runcorn
49	Redditch United	2-1	Atherstone Town
50	Rushden Town	0-0	Sutton Town
51	Sheppey United	2-3	Chatham Town
52	Sittingbourne	1-3	Dunstable
53	St Helens Town	4-3	Leyland Motors
54	St Neots Town	4-3	Potton United
55	Stalybridge Celtic	2-1	Bacup Borough
56	Stamford	5-2	March Town United
57	Stevenage Athletic	2-1	Biggleswade Town
58	Taunton Town	5-0	Chippenham Town
59	Wadebridge Town	5-1	St Blazey
60	Waterlooville	4-1	Fleet Town
61	Wealdstone	4-0	Hatfield Town
62	Welton Rovers	1-1	Bridport
63	Whitstable Town	1-4	Canterbury City
64	Winterton Rangers	3-1	Brigg Town

=== Replays ===
Tie	Home team	Score	Away team
1	Heanor Town	0-3	A P Leamington
5	Bridgend Town	2-2	Barnstaple Town
7	Salisbury	3-0	Basingstoke Town
10	Rhyl	4-3	Blaenau Ffestiniog
18	Rossendale United	2-0	Darwen
19	Clitheroe	0-4	Droylsden
22	Skegness Town	1-2	Ely City
25	Weston-super-Mare	1-0	Ferndale Athletic
34	Sudbury Town	3-1	Histon
45	New Brighton	2-0	New Mills
46	Portmadoc	4-0	Oswestry Town
48	Runcorn	1-0	Radcliffe Borough
50	Sutton Town	3-0	Rushden Town
62	Bridport	0-2	Welton Rovers

=== 2nd replay ===
Tie	Home team	Score	Away team
5	Barnstaple Town	3-2	Bridgend Town

== Second qualifying round ==
=== Ties ===
Tie	Home team	Score	Away team
1	Accrington Stanley	2-1	Rossendale United
2	Barnstaple Town	1-3	Falmouth Town
3	Bath City	1-0	Trowbridge Town
4	Bletchley	0-0	Stevenage Athletic
5	Boston	1-1	Bourne Town
6	Brierley Hill Alliance	2-3	Bedworth United
7	Chatham Town	2-0	Salisbury
8	Darlaston	2-2	A P Leamington
9	Droylsden	4-3	St Helens Town
10	Ely City	3-6	Alfreton Town
11	Folkestone	0-4	Canterbury City
12	Hatfield Main	1-2	Frickley Colliery
13	Horden Colliery Welfare	1-2	Bridlington Trinity
14	Kimberley Town	2-0	Sutton Town
15	Lowestoft Town	2-2	Sudbury Town
16	Lye Town	0-1	Dudley Town
17	Maidstone United	1-0	Crawley Town
18	Nantwich Town	2-1	New Brighton
19	Portmadoc	8-1	Connah's Quay Nomads
20	Pwllheli & District	2-2	Nantlle Vale
21	Redditch United	1-2	Belper Town
22	Rhyl	2-2	Leek Town
23	Runcorn	1-2	Formby
24	Skelmersdale United	0-1	Hyde United
25	St Neots Town	1-1	Gravesend & Northfleet
26	Stamford	3-1	Long Eaton United
27	Taunton Town	4-0	Weston-super-Mare
28	Waterlooville	0-1	Guildford City
29	Wealdstone	3-0	Dunstable
30	Welton Rovers	4-0	Wadebridge Town
31	Winterton Rangers	2-3	Stalybridge Celtic
32	Woolley Miners Welfare	2-3	Worksop Town

=== Replays ===
Tie	Home team	Score	Away team
4	Stevenage Athletic	1-2	Bletchley
5	Bourne Town	0-0	Boston
8	A P Leamington	0-1	Darlaston
15	Sudbury Town	1-2	Lowestoft Town
20	Nantlle Vale	1-2	Pwllheli & District
22	Leek Town	1-0	Rhyl
25	Gravesend & Northfleet	4-1	St Neots Town

=== 2nd replay ===
Tie	Home team	Score	Away team
5	Boston	4-0	Bourne Town

== Third qualifying round ==
=== Ties ===
Tie	Home team	Score	Away team
1	Altrincham	0-1	Pwllheli & District
2	Arnold	1-2	Worksop Town
3	Banbury United	2-1	Dudley Town
4	Bath City	0-2	Falmouth Town
5	Bedworth United	2-2	Stamford
6	Bilston	0-0	Nuneaton Borough
7	Boston United	6-0	Chatham Town
8	Bradford Park Avenue	7-0	Kimberley Town
9	Bridgwater Town	1-2	Taunton Town
10	Bridlington Trinity	3-1	Denaby United
11	Cambridge City	1-1	Margate
12	Darlaston	0-1	Tamworth
13	Gainsborough Trinity	2-2	Frickley Colliery
14	Guildford City	3-1	Gravesend & Northfleet
15	Kettering Town	5-0	Wellingborough Town
16	King's Lynn	1-0	Tonbridge
17	Lancaster City	1-4	Leek Town
18	Lowestoft Town	1-2	Bletchley
19	Maidstone United	1-2	Canterbury City
20	Matlock Town	1-1	Belper Town
21	Merthyr Tydfil	2-0	Corby Town
22	Mexborough Town	4-0	Stockton
23	Minehead	1-0	Bideford
24	Nantwich Town	2-0	Accrington Stanley
25	Northwich Victoria	3-0	Great Harwood
26	Portmadoc	2-3	Mossley
27	Sandbach Ramblers	1-1	Hyde United
28	South Shields	W/O	Alfreton Town
29	Stalybridge Celtic	1-0	Droylsden
30	Wealdstone	6-1	Boston
31	Welton Rovers	3-0	Dorchester Town
32	Witton Albion	1-1	Formby

=== Replays ===
Tie	Home team	Score	Away team
5	Stamford	0-1	Boston United
6	Nuneaton Borough	2-1	Bilston
11	Margate	2-1	Cambridge City
13	Frickley Colliery	2-3	Gainsborough Trinity
20	Belper Town	2-4	Matlock Town
27	Hyde United	0-1	Sandbach Ramblers
32	Formby	2-2	Witton Albion

=== 2nd replay ===
Tie	Home team	Score	Away team
32	Witton Albion	2-3	Formby

== 1st round ==
The teams that given byes to this round are Scarborough, Stafford Rangers, Barrow, Telford United, Macclesfield Town, Hillingdon Borough, Wimbledon, Worcester City, Romford, Weymouth, Yeovil Town, Wigan Athletic, Bangor City, Kidderminster Harriers, Bromsgrove Rovers, Burscough, Chelmsford City, Barnet, Grantham, Buxton, Burton Albion, Bedford Town, Dover, Hastings United, Stourbridge, Dartford, South Liverpool, Chorley, Ilkeston Town, Morecambe, Ashford Town (Kent) and Bexley United.

=== Ties ===
Tie	Home team	Score	Away team
1	Ashford Town (Kent)	2-3	Dartford
2	Bangor City	2-0	Bridlington Trinity
3	Bedford Town	3-2	Chelmsford City
4	Bedworth United	2-3	Stourbridge
5	Bexley United	1-2	Banbury United
6	Bradford Park Avenue	0-1	Buxton
7	Bromsgrove Rovers	3-1	King's Lynn
8	Burscough	2-0	Mossley
9	Canterbury City	1-2	Bletchley
10	Falmouth Town	0-1	Minehead
11	Grantham	4-1	Ilkeston Town
12	Guildford City	2-1	Yeovil Town
13	Hastings United	1-0	Barnet
14	Kettering Town	1-1	Nuneaton Borough
15	Leek Town	0-1	Northwich Victoria
16	Macclesfield Town	2-1	Tamworth
17	Margate	2-0	Dover
18	Merthyr Tydfil	3-3	Welton Rovers
19	Mexborough Town	0-3	Morecambe
20	Pwllheli & District	2-3	Barrow
21	Romford	2-1	Hillingdon Borough
22	Sandbach Ramblers	3-0	Nantwich Town
23	Scarborough	1-0	Gainsborough Trinity
24	South Shields	1-1	Matlock Town
25	Stafford Rangers	5-1	South Liverpool
26	Stalybridge Celtic	3-3	Formby
27	Taunton Town	0-1	Worcester City
28	Telford United	5-1	Chorley
29	Weymouth	2-1	Kidderminster Harriers
30	Wigan Athletic	2-3	Boston United
31	Wimbledon	0-1	Wealdstone
32	Worksop Town	2-1	Burton Albion

=== Replays ===
Tie	Home team	Score	Away team
14	Nuneaton Borough	1-1	Kettering Town
18	Welton Rovers	0-3	Merthyr Tydfil
24	Matlock Town	2-3	South Shields
26	Formby	0-0	Stalybridge Celtic

=== 2nd replay ===
Tie	Home team	Score	Away team
14	Kettering Town	1-0	Nuneaton Borough
26	Stalybridge Celtic	2-0	Formby

== 2nd round ==
=== Ties ===
Tie	Home team	Score	Away team
1	Banbury United	0-0	Guildford City
2	Barrow	0-2	Stafford Rangers
3	Bedford Town	1-0	Stourbridge
4	Boston United	2-1	Telford United
5	Burscough	1-1	South Shields
6	Buxton	3-2	Stalybridge Celtic
7	Dartford	0-0	Minehead
8	Grantham	3-0	Scarborough
9	Kettering Town	2-2	Bromsgrove Rovers
10	Margate	2-2	Weymouth
11	Morecambe	2-1	Bangor City
12	Romford	2-1	Merthyr Tydfil
13	Sandbach Ramblers	2-0	Northwich Victoria
14	Wealdstone	5-2	Hastings United
15	Worcester City	5-1	Bletchley
16	Worksop Town	2-2	Macclesfield Town

=== Replays ===
Tie	Home team	Score	Away team
1	Guildford City	1-2	Banbury United
5	South Shields	1-0	Burscough
7	Minehead	1-2	Dartford
9	Bromsgrove Rovers	0-3	Kettering Town
10	Weymouth	1-0	Margate
16	Macclesfield Town	4-0	Worksop Town

== 3rd round ==
=== Ties ===
Tie	Home team	Score	Away team
1	Dartford	1-1	Banbury United
2	Grantham	0-0	Bedford Town
3	Macclesfield Town	3-0	Buxton
4	Morecambe	0-0	Kettering Town
5	Romford	1-1	Stafford Rangers
6	Wealdstone	1-1	South Shields
7	Weymouth	3-0	Boston United
8	Worcester City	4-3	Sandbach Ramblers

=== Replays ===
Tie	Home team	Score	Away team
1	Banbury United	2-2	Dartford
2	Bedford Town	4-0	Grantham
4	Kettering Town	1-2	Morecambe
5	Stafford Rangers	2-0	Romford
6	South Shields	2-1	Wealdstone

2nd Replay

Tie	Home team	Score	Away team
1†	Banbury United	0-1	Dartford

† The match was played at Bedford Town.

== 4th round ==
=== Ties ===
Tie	Home team	Score	Away team
1	Bedford Town	0-1	Morecambe
2	South Shields	0-0	Worcester City
3	Stafford Rangers	0-0	Macclesfield Town
4	Weymouth	1-2	Dartford

=== Replays ===
Tie	Home team	Score	Away team
2	Worcester City	0-2	South Shields
3	Macclesfield Town	2-0	Stafford Rangers

== Semi finals ==
=== First leg ===
Tie	Home team	Score	Away team
1	Macclesfield Town	0-0	Dartford
2	South Shields	0-1	Morecambe

=== Second leg ===
Tie	Home team	Score	Away team	Aggregate
1	Dartford	2-1	Macclesfield Town	2-1
2	Morecambe	2-0	South Shields	3-0

== Final ==
Home team	Score	Away team
Morecambe	2-1	Dartford
