= Adam Fairclough (footballer) =

English footballer (born 2007)

Personal information
- Full name: Adam Anthony Fairclough
- Date of birth: 3 May 2007 (age 19)
- Place of birth: Lancashire, England
- Height: 1.86 m (6 ft 1 in)
- Position: Midfielder

Team information
- Current team: Morecambe
- Number: 27

Youth career
- –2024: Morecambe

Senior career*
Years	Team	Apps	(Gls)
2024–	Morecambe	11	(1)
2025	→ Lancaster City (loan)		
- * Club domestic league appearances and goals as of 20:55, 21 October 2025 (UTC)

Adam Anthony Fairclough (born 29 August 2007) is an English professional footballer who plays as a midfielder for

National League North club Morecambe.

== Career ==
Fairclough scored his first goal in the English Football League in Morecambe's 3–3 draw at Swindon Town on 27 April 2024, with manager Ged Brannan saying it was "a dream come true" for the 16-year-old.

On 17 October 2025, Fairclough joined Northern Premier League Premier Division club Lancaster City on an initial three-month loan deal. On 16 May 2026, Morecambe announced it was extending the player's contract,

== Career statistics ==
As of match played 31st May 2025

Appearances and goals by club, season and competition
Club	Season	League			FA Cup		EFL Cup		Other		Total	
Club	Season	Division	Apps	Goals	Apps	Goals	Apps	Goals	Apps	Goals	Apps	Goals
Morecambe	2023–24	EFL League Two	2	1	0	0	0	0	0	0	2	1
Morecambe	2024–25	EFL League Two	5	0	0	0	0	0	0	0	5	0
Morecambe	Total		7	1	0	0	0	0	0	0	7	1
Career total			7	1	0	0	0	0	0	0	7	1
