= 2024–25 Morecambe F.C. season =

101st season in existence of Morecambe FC

Morecambe
2024–25 season
- Co-chairmen: Graham Howse & Rod Taylor
- Manager: Derek Adams
- Stadium: Mazuma Mobile Stadium
- League Two: 24th (relegated)
- FA Cup: Third Round
- EFL Cup: First Round
- EFL Trophy: Round of 32
- Top goalscorer: League: Lee Angol (7); All: Ben Tollitt (8); Lee Angol (8)
- Highest home attendance: 4,901 v Carlisle United; 12 April 2025
- Lowest home attendance: 496 v Lincoln City; 10 December 2024
- Average home league attendance: 3,410
- Biggest win: Morecambe 4–2 Nottingham Forest U21; 8 October 2024; Worthing 0–2 Morecambe; 2 November 2024; Morecambe 2–0 Tranmere Rovers; 1 January 2025; Morecambe 4–2 Fleetwood Town; 1 February 2025; Morecambe 2–0 Accrington Stanley; 15 February 2025; Morecambe 2–0 Cheltenham Town; 1 April 2025
- Biggest defeat: Chelsea 5–0 Morecambe; 11 January 2025
- All statistics correct as of match played 3 May 2025.

The 2024–25 season was Morecambe's 101st season since formation, their 18th consecutive season in the Football League, and their second consecutive season in League Two, the fourth tier of English football.

They also competed in the FA Cup, EFL Cup and EFL Trophy.

== Pre-season and friendlies ==
On 12 June, Morecambe announced their initial pre-season schedule, with matches against Kendal Town, Longridge Town, Burscough, Blackburn Rovers and Southport. Three weeks later, a final pre-season fixture was confirmed, against Burton Albion.

6 July 2024 Friendly	Kendal Town	2–1	Morecambe	Kendal
15:00 BST				Stadium: Parkside Road

13 July 2024 Friendly	Longridge Town	0–1	Morecambe	Longridge
15:00 BST		Report	Edwards 57'	Stadium: The Recycling Lives Ground

16 July 2024 Friendly	Burscough	1–2	Morecambe	Burscough
19:30 BST	Trialist 84'	Report	Lewis 54'; Tollitt 60'	Stadium: The Community Stadium

21 July 2024 Friendly	Workington	1–1	Morecambe	Workington
15:00 BST	Galloway 79'	Report	Stott 82'	Stadium: Borough Park; Attendance: 413

26 July 2024 Friendly	Morecambe	1–1	Blackburn Rovers	Morecambe
19:30 BST	Edwards 12'	Report	Hedges 30'	Stadium: Mazuma Mobile Stadium; Attendance: 2,236

30 July 2024 Friendly	Southport	Cancelled	Morecambe	Blowick
19:30 BST				Stadium: Haig Avenue
Note: Fixture was cancelled due to the 2024 Southport stabbing.

3 August 2024 Friendly	Burton Albion	2–2	Morecambe	Burton upon Trent
15:00 BST	Bodin 70'; Burrell 90+3'	Report	Tollitt 34', 45'	Stadium: Pirelli Stadium; Referee: Ross Joyce

== Competitions ==
=== League Two ===
==== League table ====
Pos	Team	Pld	W	D	L	GF	GA	GD	Pts	Promotion, qualification or relegation
20	Tranmere Rovers	46	12	15	19	45	65	−20	51	
21	Accrington Stanley	46	12	14	20	53	69	−16	50	
22	Newport County	46	13	10	23	52	76	−24	49	
23	Carlisle United (R)	46	10	12	24	44	71	−27	42	Relegation to National League
24	Morecambe (R)	46	10	6	30	40	72	−32	36	Relegation to National League

Source: EFL Official Website
Rules for classification: 1) Points; 2) Goal difference; 3) Number of goals scored; 4) Head-to-head results; 5) Wins; 6) Away goals; 7) Penalty points (sec 9.5); 8) 12-point sending off offences
(R) Relegated

==== Results summary ====
Overall								Home						Away					
Pld	W	D	L	GF	GA	GD	Pts	W	D	L	GF	GA	GD	W	D	L	GF	GA	GD
46	10	6	30	40	72	−32	36	6	4	13	24	36	−12	4	2	17	16	36	−20

Last updated: 3 May 2025.
Source: Soccerway

==== Results by matchday ====
Matchday	1	2	3	4	5	6	7	8	9	10	11	12	13	14	15	16	17	18	19	20	21	22	23	24	25	26	27	28	29	30	31	32	33	34	35	36	37	38	39	40	41	42	43	44	45	46
Ground	A	H	A	H	A	H	A	H	H	A	A	H	A	H	A	H	A	A	H	A	H	A	A	H	H	A	A	H	A	A	H	H	H	A	H	A	H	A	H	H	A	H	A	H	A	H
Result	L	L	L	L	L	D	D	D	D	L	W	L	L	L	W	L	W	D	L	L	L	W	L	W	L	L	L	W	L	L	W	L	L	L	W	L	D	L	W	W	L	L	L	L	L	L
Position	19	22	24	24	24	24	24	23	23	24	23	24	24	24	24	24	23	22	23	23	24	23	24	23	23	24	24	23	23	23	23	23	23	23	23	23	23	23	23	23	23	24	24	24	24	24
Points	0	0	0	0	0	1	2	3	4	4	7	7	7	7	10	10	13	14	14	14	14	17	17	20	20	20	20	23	23	23	26	26	26	26	29	29	30	30	33	36	36	36	36	36	36	36

Updated to match(es) played on 3 May 2025. Source: EFL
A = Away; H = Home; W = Win; D = Draw; L = Loss

==== Matches ====
The league fixtures were released on 26 June 2024.

10 August 2024 1	Walsall	1–0	Morecambe	Walsall
15:00 BST	Allen 20'; Gordon (yellow card) 25'; Adomah (yellow card) 62'	Report		Stadium: Bescot Stadium; Attendance: 5,226; Referee: James Durkin

17 August 2024 2	Morecambe	0–1	Gillingham	Morecambe
15:00 BST		Report	Hutton (yellow card) 65'; Lapslie 76', (yellow card) 85'	Stadium: Mazuma Mobile Stadium; Attendance: 3,611; Referee: Daniel Middleton

24 August 2024 3	Doncaster Rovers	1–0	Morecambe	Doncaster
15:00 BST	Clifton 20' (yellow card) 81'; Fleming (yellow card) 38'	Report	Tutonda (yellow card) 62'; Songo'o (yellow card) 66'; Slew (yellow card) 73'; Hendrie (yellow card) 87'	Stadium: Eco-Power Stadium; Attendance: 6,823; Referee: Scott Tallis

31 August 2024 4	Morecambe	0–1	Newport County	Morecambe
15:00 BST	Tutonda (yellow card) 20'; Edwards (yellow card) 32'; Lewis (yellow card) 74'; Songo'o (yellow card) 89'	Report	Wildig 9'; Baker-Richardson (yellow card) 32'; Mawene (yellow card) 65'; Kamwa (yellow card) 72'; Townsend (yellow card) 80'	Stadium: Mazuma Mobile Stadium; Attendance: 2,724; Referee: Declan Bourne

7 September 2024 5	Crewe Alexandra	1–0	Morecambe	Crewe
15:00 BST	Tracey (yellow card) 9'; Hemmings 43' (pen.); Williams (yellow card) 71'	Report	Songo'o (yellow card) 71'; Angol (yellow card) 86'	Stadium: Gresty Road; Attendance: 4,868; Referee: Scott Simpson

14 August 2024 6	Morecambe	3–3	Colchester United	Morecambe
15:00 BST	Tollitt 17'; Angol (yellow card) 36'; Hendrie (yellow card) 38' (yellow-red card) 42'; Slew (yellow card) 81'; Jones 83' (pen.); Flanagan 89' (o.g.)	Report	Edwards 43'; Tovide 49'; Taylor 64'; Egbo (yellow card) 81'	Stadium: Mazuma Mobile Stadium; Attendance: 2,754; Referee: Geoff Eltringham

23 September 2024 7	Fleetwood Town	2–2	Morecambe	Fleetwood
20:00 BST	Graydon 34', (yellow card) 90+6'; Helm (yellow card) 42'; Coughlan 45+3'; Bonds (yellow card) 45+5'; Bolton (yellow card) 71'; Johnston (yellow card) 81'; Hunt (yellow card) 84'	Report	Songo'o (yellow card) 38', (goal) 74'; Angol (yellow card) 40'; Tollitt (yellow card) 63'; Hope 86'; Harrack (yellow card) 89'	Stadium: Highbury Stadium; Attendance: 4,025; Referee: Matthew Corlett
Note: Fixture was initially scheduled for 21 September, but was moved for live Sky Sports broadcast.

28 September 2024 8	Morecambe	1–1	Notts County	Morecambe
15:00 BST	Angol 2'; Tollitt (yellow card) 24'; Harrack (yellow card) 78' (yellow-red card) 90+1'; A. Lewis (yellow card) 90+5'	Report	Macari (yellow card) 69'; Platt 79'	Stadium: Mazuma Mobile Stadium; Attendance: 3,595; Referee: James Westgate

1 October 2024 9	Morecambe	1–1	Bradford City	Morecambe
19:45 BST	Diabate 5' (o.g.); Jones (yellow card) 44'	Report	Shepherd 88'	Stadium: Mazuma Mobile Stadium; Attendance: 3,606; Referee: Elliot Bell

5 October 2024 10	Accrington Stanley	2–1	Morecambe	Accrington
15:00 BST	Costelloe 36' (pen.), 45+1', (yellow card) 74'; Rawson (yellow card) 55'; O'Brien (yellow card) 90+5'	Report	Tollitt 86'	Stadium: Crown Ground; Attendance: 2,462; Referee: Adam Herczeg

12 October 2024 11	Barrow	0–1	Morecambe	Barrow-in-Furness
15:00 BST	Jackson (yellow card) 45+3'	Report	White (yellow card) 37'; Tollitt (yellow card) 45+3', (goal) 82'; Lewis (yellow card) 62'; Hope (yellow card) 90'	Stadium: Holker Street; Referee: Ben Speedie

19 October 2024 12	Morecambe	1–3	Milton Keynes Dons	Morecambe
15:00 BST	Stott 44'	Report	Tomlinson 2' (pen.); Maguire (yellow card) 7'; Hogan 22'; Kelly 49'; Offord (yellow card) 69'; Williams (yellow card) 79'	Stadium: Mazuma Mobile Stadium; Attendance: 3,448; Referee: Will Finnie

22 October 2024 13	AFC Wimbledon	3–0	Morecambe	Wimbledon
19:45 BST	Tilley 52'; Smith (yellow card) 54'; Bugiel 66'; Stevens 70'	Report	Hendrie (yellow card) 77'	Stadium: Plough Lane; Attendance: 7,651; Referee: Matthew Russell

26 October 2024 14	Morecambe	2–5	Chesterfield	Morecambe
12:30 BST	Tollitt 10'; Dackers (yellow card) 22'; Naylor 61' (o.g.); Stott (yellow card) 84'; White (yellow card) 86'; Edwards (yellow card) 89'	Report	Markanday 8'; Oldaker 48'; Grigg (yellow card) 67'; Metcalfe (yellow card) 68'; Berry 74'; Dobra 81'; Grimes 89'	Stadium: Mazuma Mobile Stadium; Attendance: 7,366; Referee: Tom Reeves

9 November 2024 15	Harrogate Town	1–2	Morecambe	Harrogate
12:30 GMT	Daly 86'	Report	Williams 37'; Macadam (yellow card) 90+2', (goal) 90+6'	Stadium: Wetherby Road; Attendance: 2,982; Referee: Alex Chilowicz

16 November 2024 16	Morecambe	0–1	Port Vale	Morecambe
15:00 GMT		Report	Chislett 83', (yellow card) 83'; Baker-Boaitey (yellow card) 85'	Stadium: Mazuma Mobile Stadium; Attendance: 4,150; Referee: Zac Kennard-Kettle

23 November 2024 17	Swindon Town	2–3	Morecambe	Swindon
15:00 GMT	Drinan 32'; Delaney 49'; Cox (yellow card) 88'	Report	Stott 6'; Tutonda (yellow card) 10'; Tollitt 14'; Hope 78'	Stadium: County Ground; Attendance: 6,494; Referee: Tom Nield

3 December 2024 18	Tranmere Rovers	2–2	Morecambe	Birkenhead
19:45 GMT	Turnbull 48'; Jennings 75'	Report	Tollitt 12'; Burgoyne (yellow card) 45+1'; Lewis 50'; Tutonda (yellow card) 59'; Williams (yellow card) 76'	Stadium: Prenton Park; Referee: Oliver Mackey

7 December 2024 19	Morecambe	0–3	Grimsby Town	Morecambe
15:00 GMT	Lewis (yellow card) 13'; Williams (yellow card) 32'; White (yellow card) 45+1'; Brown (yellow card) 88'	Report	Obikwu 25', 39'; Thompson (yellow card) 28'; Rodgers (yellow card) 65'; Rose (yellow card) 80', (goal) 90+1'	Stadium: Mazuma Mobile Stadium; Attendance: 2,995; Referee: Alan Young

14 December 2024 20	Cheltenham Town	2–0	Morecambe	Cheltenham
15:00 GMT	Thomas (yellow card) 26'; Jude-Boyd 33'; Bakare (yellow card) 64'; Miller 74'	Report	Macadam (yellow card) 64'; Williams (yellow card) 83'	Stadium: Whaddon Road; Attendance: 3,371; Referee: Sunny Singh Gill

21 December 2024 21	Morecambe	0–2	Bromley	Morecambe
15:00 GMT	Tutonda (yellow card) 39'	Report	Sowunmi 19'; Cheek 84' (pen.), (yellow card) 85'	Stadium: Mazuma Mobile Stadium; Attendance: 3,515; Referee: Steven Copeland

26 December 2024 22	Carlisle United	0–1	Morecambe	Carlisle
15:00 GMT	Ellis (yellow card) 60'; Mellish (red card) 62'	Report	Hendrie (yellow card) 37'; Edwards 61'; Lewis (yellow card) 89'; Tutonda (yellow card) 90+3'	Stadium: Brunton Park; Attendance: 9,225; Referee: Scott Oldham

29 December 2024 23	Salford City	1–0	Morecambe	Kersal
15:00 GMT	Ashley (yellow card) 45+1'; Lund 47'	Report	Williams (yellow card) 16'	Stadium: Moor Lane; Attendance: 3,179; Referee: Dale Baines

1 January 2025 24	Morecambe	2–0	Tranmere Rovers	Morecambe
15:00 GMT	White (yellow card) 11'; Songo'o 72'; Stott 84'	Report	Finley (yellow card) 34'; O'Connor (yellow card) 39'; Saunders (yellow card) 69'	Stadium: Mazuma Mobile Stadium; Attendance: 3,577; Referee: John Mulligan

18 January 2025 25	Morecambe	0–1	Crewe Alexandra	Morecambe
15:00 GMT	Williams (yellow card) 45+1'	Report	Sanders (yellow card) 19'; Long 68'; Knight-Lebel (yellow card) 74'; Williams (yellow card) 77'	Stadium: Mazuma Mobile Stadium; Attendance: 3,648; Referee: Paul Howard

25 January 2025 26	Colchester United	1–0	Morecambe	Colchester
15:00 GMT	Bishop (yellow card) 33'; Egbo 65'; Thorn (yellow card) 90+1'; Taylor (yellow card) 90+5'	Report	Hendrie (yellow card) 34'; Tutonda (yellow card) 37'; Angol (red card) 45+2'	Stadium: Colchester Community Stadium; Attendance: 4,238; Referee: Sam Purkiss

28 January 2025 27	Bradford City	1–0	Morecambe	Bradford
19:45 GMT	Kavanagh 30'; Richards (yellow card) 83'	Report	Hope (yellow card) 59'; Dackers (yellow card) 80'	Stadium: Valley Parade; Attendance: 15,083; Referee: Ben Toner

1 February 2025 28	Morecambe	4–2	Fleetwood Town	Morecambe
15:00 GMT	Cooke 13' (pen.); Hope (yellow card) 29'; Dallas 52', 59'; Dackers 86'; Taylor (yellow card) 89'	Report	Lynch (yellow card) 33'; Bolton 41' (yellow card) 88'; Bonds (yellow card) 58'; Virtue 75' (yellow card) 88'	Stadium: Mazuma Mobile Stadium; Attendance: 3,522; Referee: Edward Duckworth

4 February 2025 29	Newport County	2–1	Morecambe	Newport
19:45 GMT	Thomas 8'; Antwi (yellow card) 47'; Ajiboye 82'	Report	Tutonda (yellow card) 44'; Edwards 79'	Stadium: Rodney Parade; Attendance: 3,831; Referee: Carl Brook

8 February 2025 30	Notts County	2–0	Morecambe	Nottingham
15:00 GMT	Abbott (yellow card) 45+2'; Whitaker 56'; Jatta 75'	Report	Lewis (yellow card) 37'; Dallas (yellow card) 52'; Tutonda (yellow card) 69'; Cooke (yellow card) 69'; Taylor (yellow card) 90+1'	Stadium: Meadow Lane; Attendance: 9,909; Referee: Paul Marsden

15 February 2025 31	Morecambe	2–0	Accrington Stanley	Morecambe
15:00 GMT	Angol 54'; Garner 88'	Report	Walton (yellow card) 43'; Love (yellow card) 60'; Henderson (yellow card) 69'	Stadium: Mazuma Mobile Stadium; Attendance: 3,473; Referee: Andy Davies

18 February 2025 32	Morecambe	0–1	Doncaster Rovers	Morecambe
19:45 GMT	Dackers (yellow card) 8'; Lewis (yellow card) 72'	Report	Street 3'; Bailey (yellow card) 67'; Senior (red card) 70'; Clifton (yellow card) 82'	Stadium: Mazuma Mobile Stadium; Attendance: 2,951; Referee: Oliver Yates

22 February 2025 33	Morecambe	0–2	Walsall	Morecambe
12:30 GMT	Williams (red card) 50'	Report	Allen 53'; Jellis 87'	Stadium: Mazuma Mobile Stadium; Attendance: 3,457; Referee: Ben Speedie

1 March 2025 34	Gillingham	1–0	Morecambe	Gillingham
15:00 GMT	Gbode (yellow card) 69'; McKenzie 79'; Nevitt (yellow card) 86'; Morgan (yellow card) 90+2'	Report	Tutonda (yellow card) 70'; Hendrie (yellow card) 72'	Stadium: Priestfield Stadium; Attendance: 5,612; Referee: Ruebyn Ricardo

4 March 2025 35	Morecambe	1–0	AFC Wimbledon	Morecambe
19:45 GMT	Angol 20'; Lewis (yellow card) 86'	Report	Hutchinson (yellow card) 14'; Tilley (yellow card) 90+7'	Stadium: Mazuma Mobile Stadium; Attendance: 2488; Referee: Adam Herczeg

8 March 2025 36	Milton Keynes Dons	2–1	Morecambe	Denbigh
15:00 GMT	Trueman (yellow card) 36'; Offord 42'; Lemonheigh-Evans (yellow card) 50'; Orsi 64'; Lawrence (yellow card) 90+2'	Report	Taylor (yellow card) 19'; Angol 37' (pen.)	Stadium: Stadium MK; Attendance: 5,718; Referee: Martin Woods

15 March 2025 37	Morecambe	2–2	Barrow	Morecambe
15:00 GMT	Edwards 9', (yellow card) 12'; Taylor (red card) 28'; Angol 45+3'; Lewis (yellow card) 60'	Report	Foley (yellow card) 54'; Gotts 63', (yellow card) 76'; Smith 73'; Campbell (yellow card) 90+2'	Stadium: Mazuma Mobile Stadium; Attendance: 4,351; Referee: Scott Simpson

22 March 2025 38	Port Vale	1–0	Morecambe	Burslem
15:00 GMT	Hall (yellow card) 24'; Curtis 89', (yellow card) 90'	Report	Tutonda (yellow card) 17'; Williams (yellow card) 31'; Angol (yellow card) 58'	Stadium: Vale Park; Attendance: 7,038; Referee: Scott Oldham

29 March 2025 39	Morecambe	1–0	Swindon Town	Morecambe
15:00 GMT	Angol 38'; White (yellow card) 73'	Report	Nichols (yellow card) 41'	Stadium: Mazuma Mobile Stadium; Attendance: 3,419; Referee: Jamie O'Connor

1 April 2025 40	Morecambe	2–0	Cheltenham Town	Morecambe
19:45 BST	Garner 66'; Angol 74'	Report	Jude-Boyd (yellow card) 57'; Bakare (yellow card) 72'	Stadium: Mazuma Mobile Stadium; Attendance: 2,502; Referee: Richard Eley

5 April 2025 41	Grimsby Town	3–1	Morecambe	Cleethorpes
15:00 BST	Green 24', 80'; Turi (yellow card) 39'; Hume (yellow card) 45+1'; Barrington 48'; Tharme (yellow card) 77'	Report	Lewis (yellow card) 13'; Dallas 30', (yellow card) 40'; Tutonda (yellow card) 67'; Jones (yellow card) 86'	Stadium: Blundell Park; Attendance: 5,807; Referee: Jacob Miles

12 April 2025 42	Morecambe	0–2	Carlisle United	Morecambe
15:00 BST	Angol (yellow card) 36'	Report	Kelly 28'; Whelan (yellow card) 38'; Thomas 60'; Breeze (yellow card) 75'	Stadium: Mazuma Mobile Stadium; Attendance: 4,901; Referee: Ben Toner

18 April 2025 43	Bromley	1–0	Morecambe	Bromley
15:00 BST	Cheek 48' (pen.); Sowunmi (yellow card) 63'; Charles (yellow card) 82'	Report	Tutonda (yellow card) 66' (yellow-red card) 68'; Songo'o (yellow card) 67'; P. Lewis (yellow card) 78'	Stadium: Hayes Lane; Attendance: 2,382; Referee: Declan Bourne

21 April 2025 44	Morecambe	1–3	Salford City	Morecambe
15:00 BST	Songo'o 52' (yellow card) 66'; Lewis (yellow card) 58'; White (yellow card) 67'; Fairclough (yellow card) 90+3'	Report	Kelly 3'; Stockton 41'; N'Mai 86'	Stadium: Mazuma Mobile Stadium; Attendance: 3,027; Referee: Ben Speedie

26 April 2025 45	Chesterfield	4–1	Morecambe	Chesterfield
15:00 BST	McFadzean (yellow card) 17'; Grigg 45+1'; Palmer 61'; Olakigbe 75'; Naylor 80'	Report	Taylor (yellow card) 56'; Slew 59'; Stott (yellow card) 80'	Stadium: SMH Group Stadium; Attendance: 8,725; Referee: Matthew Corlett

3 May 2025 46	Morecambe	1–2	Harrogate Town	Morecambe
15:00 BST	Taylor 12'; Lewis (yellow card) 59'	Report	Bilongo 19'; March 22'	Stadium: Mazuma Mobile Stadium; Attendance: 3,043; Referee: Ollie Yates

=== FA Cup ===
Morecambe were drawn away to Worthing in the first round, at home to Bradford City in the second round and away to Chelsea in the third round.

2 November 2024 First Round	Worthing	0–2	Morecambe	Worthing
15:00 GMT	Wadham (yellow card) 50'	Report	Slew 7'; Stott (yellow card) 31'; Hendrie (yellow card) 61'; Williams 88'	Stadium: Woodside Road; Attendance: 3,110; Referee: Sam Mulhall

30 November 2024 Second Round	Morecambe	1–0	Bradford City	Morecambe
15:00 GMT	Slew 81'	Report	Benn (yellow card) 31'; Byrne (red card) 77'	Stadium: Mazuma Mobile Stadium; Attendance: 3,101; Referee: Seb Stockbridge

11 January 2025 Third Round	Chelsea	5–0	Morecambe	Fulham
15:00 GMT	Adarabioyo 38', 70'; Nkunku 50'; Félix 75', 77'	Report		Stadium: Stamford Bridge; Attendance: 38,998; Referee: Andrew Kitchen

=== EFL Cup ===
On 27 June, the draw for the first round was made, with Morecambe being drawn away against Huddersfield Town.

13 August 2024 First Round	Huddersfield Town	3–0	Morecambe	Huddersfield
19:45 BST	Headley 1'; Marshall 38'; Ward 43'	Report	Angol (yellow card) 14'; Harrack (yellow card) 52' (yellow-red card) 75'	Stadium: Kirklees Stadium; Attendance: 5,111; Referee: Simon Mather

=== EFL Trophy ===
==== Group stage ====
In the group stage, Morecambe were drawn into Northern Group C alongside Carlisle United, Wigan Athletic and Nottingham Forest U21. In the round of 32, Morecambe were drawn at home to Lincoln City.

Pos	Div	Team	Pld	W	PW	PL	L	GF	GA	GD	Pts	Qualification
1	L2	Morecambe	3	2	0	0	1	7	5	+2	6	Advance to Round 2
2	L1	Wigan Athletic	3	1	1	0	1	3	2	+1	5	Advance to Round 2
3	ACA	Nottingham Forest U21	3	1	0	1	1	4	5	−1	4	
4	L2	Carlisle United	3	1	0	0	2	3	5	−2	3	

Source: EFL

3 September 2024 Group Stage	Wigan Athletic	1–2	Morecambe	Wigan
19:00 BST	Hugill 63' (pen.); McHugh (yellow card) 80'; Smith (yellow card) 90+1'	Report	Macadam 12', (yellow card) 66'; Angol (yellow card) 42', (goal) 65'; Tollitt (yellow card) 70'	Stadium: Brick Community Stadium; Attendance: 1,702; Referee: Jacob Miles

8 October 2024 Group Stage	Morecambe	4–2	Nottingham Forest U21	Morecambe
19:00 BST	Williams (yellow card) 15'; Tollitt 42', 87'; Stott (yellow card) 45+2'; Brown 67'; Hope 78'; Songo'o (yellow card) 90+1'	Report	Back 22'; Lewis 50' (o.g.)	Stadium: Mazuma Mobile Stadium; Attendance: 621; Referee: John Mulligan

12 November 2024 Group Stage	Morecambe	1–2	Carlisle United	Morecambe
19:00 GMT	Hope 16'; Snowball (yellow card) 45+1'; Lewis (yellow card) 76'	Report	O'Donoghue 75'; Williams 78'	Stadium: Mazuma Mobile Stadium; Attendance: 788; Referee: Edward Duckworth

==== Knockout stage ====
10 December 2024 Round of 32	Morecambe	0–1	Lincoln City	Morecambe
19:00 GMT		Report	Cadamarteri 19'; Street (yellow card) 90'	Stadium: Mazuma Mobile Stadium; Attendance: 496; Referee: Michael Barlow

== Transfers ==
=== In ===
Date	Pos.	Player	From	Fee	Ref.
12 July 2024	GK	Harry Burgoyne (ENG)	Shrewsbury Town (ENG)	Free	
12 July 2024	RB	Luke Hendrie (ENG)	Bradford City (ENG)	Free	
12 July 2024	CF	Hallam Hope (BRB)	Oldham Athletic (ENG)	Free	
12 July 2024	RB	Adam Lewis (ENG)	Liverpool (ENG)	Free	
12 July 2024	CM	Paul Lewis (ENG)	Tranmere Rovers (ENG)	Free	
12 July 2024	RB	Ross Millen (SCO)	Raith Rovers (SCO)	Free	
12 July 2024	CB	George Ray (WAL)	Barrow (ENG)	Free	
12 July 2024	CB	Jamie Stott (ENG)	FC Halifax Town (ENG)	Free	
12 July 2024	CB	Max Taylor (ENG)	Rochdale (ENG)	Free	
12 July 2024	RM	Ben Tollitt (ENG)	Oldham Athletic (ENG)	Free	
12 July 2024	CM	Tom White (ENG)	Barrow (ENG)	Free	
18 July 2024	CM	Harvey Macadam (ENG)	Fleetwood Town (ENG)	Free	
26 July 2024	CF	Lee Angol (ENG)	Sutton United (ENG)	Free	
14 January 2025	GK	Ryan Schofield (ENG)	Portsmouth (ENG)	Free	
15 January 2025	CM	Callum Cooke (ENG)	Hartlepool United (ENG)	Free	

=== Out ===
Date	Pos.	Player	To	Fee	Ref.
3 January 2025	CF	Charlie Brown (ENG)	Accrington Stanley (ENG)	Undisclosed	

=== Loaned in ===
Date	Pos.	Player	From	Date until	Ref.
12 July 2024	CM	Callum Jones (WAL)	Hull City (ENG)	End of Season	
20 August 2024	CB	Rhys Williams (ENG)	Liverpool (ENG)	End of Season (Note: On 2 January, Williams' loan from Liverpool was extended until the end of season.)	
30 August 2024	CF	Marcus Dackers (WAL)	Salford City (ENG)	End of Season	
31 January 2025	CF	Andrew Dallas (SCO)	Barnsley (ENG)	End of Season	
3 February 2025	CF	Gerard Garner (ENG)	Barrow (ENG)	End of Season	

=== Loaned out ===
Date	Pos.	Player	To	Date until	Ref.
20 September 2024	CB	Andy Evans (ENG)	Darlington (ENG)	20 October 2024	
14 November 2024	CM	Nathan Mercer (ENG)	Bamber Bridge (ENG)	12 December 2024	
23 December 2024	CB	Nathan Snowball (ENG)	Morpeth Town (ENG)	20 January 2025	
23 January 2025	CB	Joseph Sowerby (ENG)	Kendal Town (ENG)	20 February 2025	
13 February 2025	CM	Nathan Mercer (ENG)	Wythenshawe (ENG)	13 March 2025	
13 February 2025	CM	Callum Stewart-Cooney (ENG)	Wythenshawe (ENG)	13 March 2025	
12 March 2025	CM	Nathan Mercer (ENG)	Kendal Town (ENG)	End of Season	

=== Released / Out of Contract ===
Date	Pos.	Player	Subsequent club	Join date	Ref.
30 June 2024	CB	Jacob Bedeau (GRN)	Notts County (ENG)	1 July 2024	
30 June 2024	DM	Jacob Davenport (ENG)	Derry City (IRL)	1 July 2024	
30 June 2024	CM	JJ McKiernan (NIR)	Lincoln City (ENG)	1 July 2024	
30 June 2024	RB	Joel Senior (ENG)	Bristol Rovers (ENG)	1 July 2024	
30 June 2024	RB	Oscar Threlkeld (ENG)	Torquay United (ENG)	1 July 2024	
30 June 2024	CB	Farrend Rawson (ENG)	Accrington Stanley (ENG)	2 July 2024	
30 June 2024	RB	Donald Love (SCO)	Accrington Stanley (ENG)	23 July 2024	
30 June 2024	SS	Cammy Smith (SCO)	Peterhead (SCO)	1 August 2024	
30 June 2024	GK	Adam Smith (ENG)	Hartlepool United (ENG)	3 August 2024	
30 June 2024	CB	Chris Stokes (ENG)	Barrow (ENG)	5 August 2024	
30 June 2024	LW	Brandon Barker (ENG)	Avro (ENG)		
30 June 2024	CF	Jordy Hiwula (ENG)			
30 June 2024	LB	Max Melbourne (ENG)			
30 June 2024	GK	George Pedley (ENG)			
30 June 2024	CM	Cameron Rooney (ENG)			
30 June 2024	CM	Jake Taylor (ENG)			
31 December 2024	CB	Kayden Harrack (GRN)	Dagenham & Redbridge (ENG)	31 December 2024	

== Statistics ==
=== Appearances and goals ===
As of match played 8 April 2025

Players with no appearances are not included on the list

No.	Pos	Nat	Player	Total		League Two		FA Cup		EFL Cup		EFL Trophy	
No.	Pos	Nat	Player	Apps	Goals	Apps	Goals	Apps	Goals	Apps	Goals	Apps	Goals
1	GK	(England) ENG	Harry Burgoyne	31	0	23+2	0	2+0	0	1+0	0	3+0	0
2	DF	(England) ENG	Luke Hendrie	40	0	34+0	0	3+0	0	1+0	0	1+1	0
3	DF	(England) ENG	Adam Lewis	47	1	26+13	1	2+1	0	1+0	0	2+2	0
4	MF	(England) ENG	Tom White	35	0	22+7	0	3+0	0	1+0	0	0+2	0
5	DF	(England) ENG	Max Taylor	20	0	10+5	0	0+1	0	1+0	0	3+0	0
6	DF	(England) ENG	Jamie Stott	46	3	38+2	3	3+0	0	1+0	0	2+0	0
7	FW	(Wales) WAL	Gwion Edwards	29	3	19+6	3	1+1	0	1+0	0	0+1	0
8	MF	(England) ENG	Harvey Macadam	36	2	22+7	1	2+1	0	1+0	0	3+0	1
9	FW	(Barbados) BRB	Hallam Hope	30	4	12+11	2	1+2	0	0+0	0	3+1	2
10	FW	(England) ENG	Lee Angol	23	8	16+5	7	0+0	0	1+0	0	1+0	1
11	FW	(England) ENG	Jordan Slew	35	2	8+19	0	2+1	2	1+0	0	4+0	0
12	GK	(England) ENG	Ryan Schofield	3	0	3+0	0	0+0	0	0+0	0	0+0	0
14	DF	(England) ENG	Rhys Williams	37	2	31+1	1	3+0	1	0+0	0	2+0	0
15	DF	(Wales) WAL	George Ray	3	0	1+1	0	0+0	0	0+0	0	1+0	0
16	FW	(Scotland) SCO	Andrew Dallas	13	3	11+2	3	0+0	0	0+0	0	0+0	0
17	MF	(England) ENG	Paul Lewis	30	0	14+10	0	0+2	0	0+0	0	3+1	0
18	MF	(England) ENG	Ben Tollitt	42	8	24+10	6	3+0	0	1+0	0	3+1	2
19	FW	(Wales) WAL	Marcus Dackers	37	1	21+13	1	2+1	0	0+0	0	0+0	0
20	MF	(England) ENG	Callum Cooke	16	1	9+7	1	0+0	0	0+0	0	0+0	0
22	DF	(Scotland) SCO	Ross Millen	22	0	5+12	0	0+1	0	1+0	0	3+0	0
23	DF	(Democratic Republic of the Congo) COD	David Tutonda	43	0	32+6	0	1+0	0	1+0	0	1+2	0
24	MF	(Cameroon) CMR	Yann Songo'o	36	2	22+9	2	2+0	0	1+0	0	1+1	0
25	GK	(England) ENG	Stuart Moore	17	0	15+0	0	1+0	0	0+0	0	1+0	0
26	MF	(England) ENG	Lennon Dobson	1	0	0+1	0	0+0	0	0+0	0	0+0	0
28	MF	(Wales) WAL	Callum Jones	35	1	26+3	1	2+0	0	1+0	0	2+1	0
29	MF	(England) ENG	Adam Fairclough	1	0	0+1	0	0+0	0	0+0	0	0+0	0
30	MF	(England) ENG	Nathan Mercer	1	0	0+0	0	0+0	0	0+0	0	0+1	0
31	DF	(England) ENG	Nathan Snowball	1	0	0+0	0	0+0	0	0+0	0	1+0	0
33	FW	(England) ENG	Gerard Garner	8	2	3+5	2	0+0	0	0+0	0	0+0	0
Players who featured but departed the club permanently during the season:
12	DF	(Grenada) GRN	Kayden Harrack	13	0	4+4	0	0+1	0	1+0	0	3+0	0
20	FW	(England) ENG	Charlie Brown	7	1	0+4	0	0+0	0	0+0	0	1+2	1
