= Morecambe F.C. =

English football club

Morecambe
- Full name: Morecambe Football Club
- Nickname: The Shrimps
- Founded: 7 May 1920; 106 years ago
- Ground: Halo Aerospace Stadium
- Capacity: 6,476 (2,247 seated)
- Coordinates: 54.0615°N 2.8672°W
- Owner: Panjab Warriors
- Chairman: Kuljeet Singh
- Manager: Adam Lakeland
- League: National League North
- 2025–26: National League, 22nd of 24 (relegated)
- Website: morecambefc.com
Home colours	Away colours

Morecambe Football Club is a professional association football club based in Morecambe, Lancashire, England. The team plays in the National League North, the sixth level of the English football league system, following relegation from the National League.

The club was founded in 1920, and is notable for not experiencing relegation from any league until 2023. For their first 48 years they competed in the Lancashire Combination, winning the league title five times, in 1924–25, 1961–62, 1962–63, 1966–67 and 1967–68. They joined the newly-formed Northern Premier League in 1968, remaining in that league until, under manager Jim Harvey, a second-place finish in 1994–95 saw them promoted into the Conference. Having been beaten in the 2003 and 2006 play-off semi-finals, Sammy McIlroy led the club to promotion into the Football League with victory in the 2007 play-off final. In 14 seasons in League Two they reached the play-offs twice, achieving promotion after winning the 2021 League Two play-off final. Following two seasons in League One they were relegated, and three years later dropped again to the National League North. Their relegations were associated with financial problems and Morecambe were briefly suspended from league football during the summer of 2025, with closure of the club perilously close. However, a change to ownership by Panjab Warriors saw debts cleared and the club survived, but it suffered a second successive relegation in April 2026.

In cups, Morecambe's biggest win was the FA Trophy in 1974. They also won the Northern Premier League President's Cup in 1992, and the Conference League Cup in 1998. They have reached the FA Cup third round on seven occasions, and the EFL Cup third round twice.

Nicknamed "The Shrimps" due to the coastal town's local speciality food, the club has played home games at what (for sponsorship reasons) is currently called the Halo Aerospace Stadium, having moved from its original home at Christie Park in 2010. The club has rivalries with nearby Accrington Stanley, with non-League neighbours Lancaster City of the same council area, and other Lancashire clubs.

== History ==
=== 1920–2007: Non-League ===
Football in the town dates back to the turn of the 20th century; however, it was not until 7 May 1920 that Morecambe FC was formed after a meeting at the local West View Hotel. The club then took its place in the Lancashire Combination League for the 1920–21 season.

Sharing grounds with Morecambe Cricket Club at Woodhill Lane during the first season, football proved popular, with crowds in excess of 3,000 for derby fixtures with Lancaster City and Fleetwood Town. Although success on the field was hard to come by, with the club languishing near the bottom of the table, at the end of the first season the club moved grounds to Roseberry Park. A few years later after the purchase of the ground by the then-President, J.B. Christie, the ground's name was changed to Christie Park in his honour. Those early seasons proved difficult, and it was not until 1924–25 that the club began to enjoy some success, claiming the league title for the first time; this was later followed by success in the Lancashire Junior Cup, beating old rivals Chorley after two replays, and in front of over 30,000 spectators.

Christie bequeathed the ground to the club in 1927 and also helped incorporate the club into a Limited Company with a then share capital of £1,000. The rest of the 1920s and the whole of the 1930s saw a constant struggle to keep football alive on the North West coast, with poor results on the field and little or no revenue off the field.

The post-war era saw an upturn in the Shrimps' fortunes with steady progress throughout the late 1940s and nearly all the 1950s, with a visible marked improvement when in 1956 Ken Horton was appointed player-manager. Whilst success was only just around the corner, the foundations for the future were being built. The Auxiliary Supporters club had been formed and with their help many ground improvements were undertaken, so that the on-field success dovetailed neatly with the off-field enterprise. Morecambe enjoyed success during the fourteen years from 1960. This included an FA Cup third round appearance in 1961–62, a 1–0 defeat to Weymouth; a Lancashire Senior Cup final victory in 1968, a 2–1 win over Burnley; and an FA Trophy success at Wembley in 1974, a 2–1 win over Dartford in the final.

The next 12 years were as barren as any previous period in the club's history. Attendances fell from a creditable 2,000 plus to a miserable 200 minus, with a visible decline in the club fortunes during that period. However, in 1985–86, signs of improvement appeared; the club's league position improved, and success in cups came as well over the next few years. It took ten years for the club to reach its ambition of promotion to the Football Conference after many further improvements, not only to the ground but also to the club's structure. Their promotion at the end of the 1994–95 Northern Premier League season came after Marine's ground did not meet Conference requirements, so second-placed Morecambe took their place.

From their first Conference season (1995–96), the Shrimps became one of the leading teams in the league. Only Woking had a longer unbroken membership of the league at this time. The runners-up spot was claimed on one occasion and the play-off positions were narrowly missed twice. Also during this time, the club equalled its best appearance in the FA Cup in both 2000–01 and 2002–03. On both occasions the club faced Ipswich Town, losing 3–0 and 4–0 respectively. Morecambe also defeated a few league clubs in the FA Cup, including Cambridge United in 2000–01 and Chesterfield in 2002–03.

In November 2005, Jim Harvey suffered a heart attack during a league game at Christie Park against Cambridge United. The club quickly declared the appointment of a caretaker manager, Sammy McIlroy, a long-time friend of Harvey. After McIlroy's initial three-month stint as caretaker expired, he was given the job for the remainder of the season with Harvey expected to return on its closure. However, on his first day back as manager of Morecambe, Harvey was sacked by the club and McIlroy was appointed as permanent manager.

In the absence of Harvey, Morecambe reached the Conference play-offs. They lost to Hereford 4–3 on aggregate, but McIlroy was appointed on a permanent basis in May 2006. The following season, Morecambe were promoted to the Football League for the first time in their history after winning the Conference play-off final, beating Exeter City 2–1 at Wembley on 20 May 2007, in front of over 40,000 fans which followed their semi-final victory over York City.

=== 2007–2022: Football League, including promotion to League One ===
Chart of yearly table positions of Morecambe since promotion in the Football Conference

On 17 July 2007, Morecambe announced plans to move to a new stadium by the start of the 2009–10 season. However, work did not start on the proposed site until spring 2009, with completion anticipated in summer 2010.

Morecambe played their first Football League game against Barnet at Christie Park on 11 August 2007, earning a 0–0 draw. On 14 August 2007, Morecambe played their first League Cup tie, winning 2–1 against near neighbours Preston North End at Deepdale. The Shrimps then beat another Championship side, winning 3–1 win against Wolverhampton Wanderers on 28 August. In the third round, they faced a third consecutive Championship side, Sheffield United, but lost 5–0. They finished their first League Two season in 11th place with 60 points. They also finished 11th in the 2008–09 season, with 63 points.

The 2009–10 season was Morecambe's last at Christie Park, and they finished in fourth place, qualifying for the play-offs, but lost 7–2 on aggregate to Dagenham & Redbridge. On 10 August 2010, Morecambe played their first match at the Globe Arena against Championship side Coventry City in the League Cup. Morecambe won 2–0, with Andy Fleming scoring the first two goals at the stadium.. After the club finished the 2010–11 season in 20th place, Morecambe manager Sammy McIlroy left the club by mutual consent on 9 May 2011, after five years.

On 13 May 2011, Jim Bentley signed a two-year deal as player-manager. After a promising start to the 2011–12 season, a poor end to the season led to Morecambe finishing 15th in League Two. In Bentley's second season they finished 16th. Bentley signed a two-year contract extension in October 2013, and two further extensions in August 2015 and October 2017. Over this period, Morecambe retained their League status with 18th, 11th, 21st, 18th, 22nd and 18th finishing positions. In May 2018, the club was sold to Bond Group Investments.

Starting in June 2018, Bentley spent 16 months as the longest serving manager in the top four tiers of English football before leaving in October 2019 to become AFC Fylde's manager. In November 2019, Morecambe appointed Derek Adams as manager. The remainder of the season, shortened by the COVID-19 pandemic, saw the Shrimps finish 22nd after 37 games played, again avoiding relegation.

In the 2020–21 season, the club faced two Premier League sides in two cup competitions, falling to Newcastle United in the third round of the EFL Cup and to Chelsea in the third round of the FA Cup at Stamford Bridge; the latter equalled their furthest run in the FA Cup since the early 2000s. In the league, the club qualified in fourth place for the League Two play-offs with 78 points, missing automatic promotion by one point. Following a 3–2 aggregate win over Tranmere Rovers in the semi-final, the club reached a first League play-off final. In the 2021 League Two play-off final against Newport County at Wembley Stadium on 31 May 2021, Morecambe won 1–0, after Carlos Mendes Gomes converted a penalty in the 107th minute. This earned the Shrimps promotion to League One, the third tier of English football, for the first time in their history. Adams resigned three days later to become manager of Bradford City.

In June 2021, the club announced former Motherwell manager Stephen Robinson as manager for the club's first season in League One. Their first game was a 2–2 draw at Ipswich Town. The club again reached the FA Cup third round, playing another London-based Premier League side, Tottenham Hotspur. After scoring the first goal, Morecambe were undone by late goals from Harry Kane, Lucas Moura and Harry Winks to lose 3–1 at Tottenham Hotspur Stadium. After 32 games, Robinson left to take over at Scottish club St Mirren. Adams returned as manager, and, despite the club flirting with relegation, led them out of the drop zone to finish 19th and retain League One status for a second season.

=== 2022–2026: Three relegations amid financial problems ===
In October 2022, Adams voiced worries about the future of the club. Its owners, Bond Group Investments, had put the club up for sale in September 2022, with directors Jason Whittingham and Colin Goldring stepping down from the Shrimps' board. In March 2023, players' wages were paid late, with funds invested by Sarbjot Johal, who was aiming to take over the club, ultimately bridging the gap. However, uncertainty about the club's ownership continued, ultimately through to August 2025.

In May 2023, Morecambe were relegated to League Two. Fourteen players left the club after their contracts expired, with no players offered new deals. In August 2023, Morecambe received a suspended three-point deduction for paying its players late in March. In December 2023, Morecambe and owner Jason Whittingham were charged by the EFL for failures over players' wages, and in April 2024, the three-point deduction was activated and Whittingham was fined £10,000. The club finished the 2023–24 season in 15th place.

On 30 April 2024, after succeeding Derek Adams as manager in November 2023, Ged Brannan left to join League Two rivals Accrington Stanley. Manager-less, with chief executive Ben Sadler joining Walsall, and with only one player under contract for the next season due to an ongoing transfer embargo, the club was described as "a circus" by its chairman Rod Taylor in May 2024. On 20 May 2024, Morecambe announced the departure of 16 players, leaving the club with a five-strong first-team squad. The following day, club directors called on Whittingham to sell the club to avoid a 'catastrophic outcome'. Derek Adams returned for a third spell as manager in early June 2024. A month later, talks over a possible buyout of the club were reported to be at "an advanced stage", the transfer embargo was lifted (though Morecambe were fined £5,131.82 for failing to meet payment obligations) and Morecambe signed 15 players.

On 19 December 2024, Morecambe received a suspended two-points deduction for five failures to report non-payment of accounts owed to HM Revenue and Customs (HMRC). On 23 January 2025, the club - 23rd in League Two and five points from safety - insisted it was "not in immediate jeopardy" despite having no proof of funds for the rest of the season and being unable to sign players in the transfer window. However, Morecambe later secured funds to sign players.

==== 2025–26: Return to Non-League and an ownership crisis ====
On 21 April 2025, after 18 years in the Football League, Morecambe were relegated to the National League at the end of the 2024–25 season. Club directors subsequently reported "positive progress" towards the sale of the club, and a deal with Panjab Warriors, a sports investment company, was approved by the EFL in early June, but Whittingham delayed the deal.

When administration loomed in early July after non-payment of staff wages, Whittingham sacked the club's directors, then claimed that a new buyer was set to take over the club. This deal was never sealed, and as players and staff again went unpaid, the club was placed under a registration embargo by the National League for breaching financial regulations, and in late July 2025 was then suspended by the League, with the side's first three League fixtures postponed. The club was given until 20 August to resolve the situation but football operations ceased and players left to join other clubs. The ownership crisis was raised in Parliament with both the culture secretary Lisa Nandy and UK prime minister Sir Keir Starmer urging all concerned with the club to ensure its survival. Six weeks of sometimes acrimonious claims and counter-claims between Panjab Warriors and Whittingham's Bond Group eventually concluded with an agreement announced on 14 August, enabling the club to avoid a HMRC winding-up petition, appoint new directors, pay staff and players, and expand the remaining squad of contracted players ahead of the side's first National League fixture.

Panjab Warriors had sacked manager Derek Adams, appointing Ashvir Singh Johal as his replacement on 19 August. He took on a side with just five contracted players. On 20 August, Morecambe confirmed their opening fixture against Altrincham would go ahead on 23 August, and said the transfer embargo had been lifted, allowing the club to sign players. Twelve new players were signed ahead of the Altrincham game, which Morecambe won 2–1, though the side then lost its next four games.

On 4 December 2025, HM Treasury announced it had sanctioned Panjab Warriors member Gurpreet Singh Rehal under the Domestic Counter-Terrorism Regime. HMT said it had frozen Rehal's UK assets and disqualified him from managing UK companies, alleging that he had undertaken recruitment, financial support and weapons procurement for the Babbar Khalsa and Babbar Akali Lehar groups. Morecambe said Rehal's associations with the club and Panjab Warriors had been fully removed.

In January 2026, after just five wins in 28 league games, Singh Johal left the club; on 1 February 2026, Jim Bentley was reappointed as manager until the end of the season. In his fifth game in charge, on 21 February 2026, Morecambe beat Eastleigh 4–0 to end a ten-match winless streak. Between 27 February and 18 March 2026, the National League placed Morecambe under a transfer embargo over a disputed payment to former owners Bond Group Investments. Also in March 2026, the club was served with a winding-up petition by a supplier, KPM Groundworks Limited, relating to a debt incurred prior to the Panjab Warriors takeover. The debt was later settled.

On 11 April 2026, Morecambe suffered a third relegation in four years following a 5–1 defeat at Woking (ultimately finishing in 22nd place on 38 points), and would play in the sixth tier National League North in the 2026–27 season, for the first time since 1995. Bentley stood down as manager at the end of the season, and was replaced by former Halifax Town manager Adam Lakeland. In May 2026, Morecambe released 18 players following the club's relegation from the National League.

In July 2026, Morecambe was warned by the Independent Football Regulator after failing to respond to requests about the running of the club - the first time the IFR has taken action since the Football Governance Act came into force in July 2025 - and in August, the club and its owners were officially reprimanded by the IFR "for failing to provide a timely and complete response to information requirements". Also in August 2026, Morecambe was placed under a temporary transfer embargo by the National League for late submission of budgetary information. The Lancaster Guardian, marking Panjab Warriors 12 months in charge, criticised "a glaring lack of communication" from the club.

== Kit and main shirt sponsors ==
Table of kit suppliers and shirt sponsors appear below:

Period	Kit manufacturer	Shirt sponsor
1920–74		
1974–78	Umbro	
1978–79	Litesome	
1979–80	Litesome	Holmark
1981–82	Adidas	Mitchells
1983–84	Umbro	John Wilding
1984–85		MG Markets
1985–86		Carlton Caterers
1986–87	Umbro	Carlton Caterers
1987–88		Carlton Caterers
1988–91	Umbro	Cvg
1992–93		Mitchells
1993–94	Asics	Carleton Inn
1994–95		Printing Machinery
1995–96	Pony International	Ais Products
1996–97	Pony International	Lakesway
1997–98	Pony International	Oasis
1998–99	Pony International	Ambulink UK
1999–2000	Umbro	Redman & Jones
2000–02	Umbro	Business Serve PLC
2002–04	Umbro	Thurnham Leisure Group
2004–07	Umbro	Wright & Lord Solicitors
2007–08	Umbro	Jiang Print
2008–09	Puma SE	Mopay.co.uk
2009–12	Puma SE	Bench.
2012–13	Fila	Carbrini
2013–14	Fila	Blacks Leisure Group
2014–15	Fila	Carbrini
2015–16	Carbrini	JD Sports
2016–17	Carbrini	Omega Holidays
2017–18	Macron	Purple Property Group
2018–19	Macron	Bizloans4u
2019–21	Macron	Annapurna Recruitment
2021–23	Joma	Mazuma
2023–24	Joma	Omnia
2024–25	The Terrace	The Fan Cave Memorabilia
2025–26	The Terrace	LBD Modular Systems Ltd
2026–	Surridge Sport	Honest Accounting

=== Mascot ===
The Shrimps' mascot is Christie the Cat, named after Morecambe's old stadium, Christie Park.

== Stadiums ==
After sharing grounds with Morecambe Cricket Club at Woodhill Lane, the club moved grounds to Roseberry Park. Located on the corner of Christie Avenue and Lancaster Road, it was the first permanent home of Morecambe F.C., and was later renamed Christie Park after the club's benefactor, J. B. Christie. In July 2007, Morecambe announced plans to move to a new stadium in time for the start of the 2010–11 season.

The Halo Aerospace Stadium, formerly known as the Mazuma Mobile Stadium, previously as the Globe Arena for sponsorship reasons, opened in 2010, replacing Christie Park. The stadium holds up to 6,476 supporters, with 2,173 seats available in the Main Stand, which runs the length of one side of the pitch. Opposite the Main Stand is an uncovered terrace with a capacity of 606. At either ends of the pitch are the home and away stands, with the home end holding a maximum of 2,234 supporters and the away end having a capacity of 1,389. In the north east corner of the stadium is the Tyson Fury Foundation, which is split between two floors. The building also houses a gym, which was purchased by Tyson Fury in August 2020.

== Rivalries ==
Historically Morecambe's biggest rivalry has been with Lancaster City; however after Morecambe rose up the leagues there have been fewer matches between the two clubs since the 1980s. From the early 1990s, Morecambe engaged in a bitter rivalry with Lancashire neighbours Accrington Stanley. The Shrimps failed to beat Accrington in 16 attempts after their 2007 promotion to the Football League before Aaron Wildig's goal gave them a 1–0 win over their rivals in August 2015. Morecambe's other local rivals include Barrow, Fleetwood Town, Kendal Town and Southport.

== Players ==
=== Current squad ===
As of 17 August 2026

Note: Flags indicate national team as defined under FIFA eligibility rules; some limited exceptions apply. Players may hold more than one non-FIFA nationality.

No.	Pos.	Nation	Player
1	GK	ENG	Joe Young
2	DF	WAL	Cameron Coxe
3	DF	WAL	Ben Williams
4	DF	ENG	Liam Hogan
5	DF	ENG	Will Smith
6	DF	ENG	Lewis Baines
7	FW	ENG	Teddy Collis
8	MF	ENG	Lewis Leigh
9	FW	ENG	Joe Garner
10	MF	ENG	Matty Daly
11	MF	ENG	Elliot Newby
13	GK	ENG	Myles Boney

No.	Pos.	Nation	Player
14	FW	ENG	Isaac Buckley-Ricketts
17	MF	ENG	Paul Lewis
18	MF	ENG	Taelor O'Kane
19	FW	ENG	Ronnie Blois
20	MF	ENG	Jake Cain
21	FW	ZIM	Alex Cherera
22	MF	ENG	Ruben Curley (on loan from Stoke City)
26	MF	ENG	Lennon Dobson
27	MF	ENG	Adam Fairclough
28	MF	ENG	Elijah Vilchez
29	FW	ENG	Oscar Wright
30	MF	ENG	Corey Goodyear
31	GK	ENG	Alfie Scales

== Club officials ==
Board

- Directors: Harjit Singh, Kuljeet Singh Moni

Coaching staff

- Manager: Adam Lakeland
- Assistant Manager: Sam Walker
- Assistant Coach: Neil Wainwright
- Goalkeeper Coach: Jon Stewart
- First team analyst: James Peat
- Head of Recruitment: Patrick Noubissié
- Sports director: Robbie Threlfall
- Head of Physical Performance: Ian Hutton
- Head Physiotherapist: Gareth Thomas
- Performance Analyst: Aurie De Carteret
- Lead Sports Therapist: Peter Bailey
- Sports Therapist: Harry Rolls
- Kit man: Les Dewhirst

=== Managerial history (1947 to present) ===
As of match played 25 April 2026

Date	Name	Record (P/W/D/L/%)					Notes	Ref
1947–48	(Scotland) Jimmy Milne	0	0	0	0	—		
1955–56	(England) Albert Dainty	0	0	0	0	—		
1956–61	(England) Ken Horton	0	0	0	0	—		
1961–64	(Scotland) Joe Dunn	0	0	0	0	—		
1964–65	(England) Geoff Twentyman	0	0	0	0	—		
1965–69	(England) Ken Waterhouse	0	0	0	0	—		
1969–70	(England) Ronnie Clayton	0	0	0	0	—		
1970	Gerry Irving & Ronnie Mitchell	0	0	0	0	—		
1970–72	(England) Ken Waterhouse	0	0	0	0	—		
1972–75	Dave Roberts	0	0	0	0	—	Player manager. Won FA Trophy at Wembley in 1974	
1976–77	Johnny Johnson	0	0	0	0	—		
1977–78	Tommy Ferber	0	0	0	0	—		
1978–79	Mick Hogarth	0	0	0	0	—		
1979–81	Don Cubbage	0	0	0	0	—		
1981	(Scotland) Jim Thomson	0	0	0	0	—		
1981–84	Les Rigby	0	0	0	0	—		
1984–85	Sean Gallagher	0	0	0	0	—		
1985–88	Joe Wojciechowicz	0	0	0	0	—		
1988–89	(England) Billy Wright	0	0	0	0	—		
1989–93	(England) Bryan Griffiths	0	0	0	0	—		
1994	(Wales) Leighton James	0	0	0	0	—		
1994–05	(Northern Ireland) Jim Harvey	554	254	125	175	45.8	Won promotion to the Conference from the Northern Premier League in 1995	
2005–11 (Note: Caretaker manager for his first six months.)	(Northern Ireland) Sammy McIlroy	268	100	77	91	37.3	Won promotion to the Football League from the Conference in 2007	
2011–19	(England) Jim Bentley	434	123	119	192	28.3		
2019	(England) Kevin Ellison & (Republic of Ireland) Barry Roche	2	1	0	1	50.0	Joint caretaker player managers	
2019–21	(Scotland) Derek Adams	79	34	18	27	43.0	Won promotion to League One from League Two in 2021	
2021–22	(Northern Ireland) Stephen Robinson	40	10	10	20	25.0		
2022	(Republic of Ireland) Barry Roche	1	0	0	1	0.0	Caretaker player manager	
2022–23	(Scotland) Derek Adams	88	24	25	39	27.3	Relegated from League One to League Two in 2023	
2023–24	(England) Ged Brannan	32	10	7	15	31.3		
2024–25	(Scotland) Derek Adams	54	14	6	34	25.9	Relegated from League Two to National League in 2025	
2025–26	(England) Ashvir Singh Johal	32	6	7	19	18.8		
2026	(England) Jim Bentley	18	4	5	9	22.2	Relegated from National League to National League North in 2026	

== Records ==
Performance

- Best FA Cup performance: Third round, 1961–62, 2001–02, 2003–04, 2020–21, 2021–22, 2023–24, 2024–25
- Best EFL Cup performance: Third round, 2007–08, 2020–21, 2022–23
- Best EFL Trophy performance: Northern area final, 2007–08
- Best FA Trophy performance: Winners, 1973–74

== Honours ==
League

- League Two (level 4)
  - Play-off winners: 2021
- Conference National (level 5)
  - Play-off winners: 2007
- Northern Premier League (level 6)
  - Runners-up and promoted: 1994–95
- Lancashire Combination
  - Champions: 1924–25, 1961–62, 1962–63, 1966–67, 1967–68
  - Runners-up: 1925–26

Cup

- FA Trophy
  - Winners: 1973–74
- Conference League Cup
  - Winners: 1997–98
- Northern Premier League President's Cup
  - Winners: 1991–92
- Lancashire Senior Cup
  - Winners: 1967–68
- Lancashire FA Challenge Trophy
  - Winners (11): 1925–26, 1926–27, 1961–62, 1962–63, 1968–69, 1985–86, 1986–7, 1993–94, 1995–96, 1998–99, 2003–04
- Lancashire Combination Cup
  - Winners: 1926–27, 1945–46, 1964–65, 1966–67, 1967–68
