= 2026–27 Hartlepool United F.C. season =

Association football club season

Hartlepool United
2026–27 season
- Owner: Landon Smith
- Chairman: Landon Smith
- Head coach: Lee Clark (until 19 September); Pete Wild (from 1 October)
- Ground: Victoria Park
- FA Cup: Fourth qualifying round (eliminated by Marine)
- National League Cup: Group stage
- Top goalscorer: League: Will Harris (6); All: Will Harris (6)
- Highest home attendance: 5,830 (vs. Barrow)
- Lowest home attendance: 205 (vs. Everton U21)
| Home colours | Away colours |

The 2026–27 season is the 109th season of competitive association football and eighth season in the National League played by Hartlepool United Football Club, a professional football club based in Hartlepool, County Durham, England. Their ninth-place finish in 2025–26 meant it will be their fourth successive season in the National League. In addition to participating in the National League, they will also compete in the FA Cup, FA Trophy and National League Cup. The season covers the period from 1 July 2026 to 30 June 2027.

== Background and pre-season ==
They had been relegated from the Football League for the first time in 2016–17 since joining in 1921. After four seasons in the National League, Hartlepool won the 2021 National League play-off final on penalties but were relegated back to the National League after two seasons at the end of the 2022–23 season. Hartlepool finished the 2025–26 season in 9th position, 13 points below the play-off positions. The 2026–27 season is Hartlepool's fourth successive season in the National League.

The 2025–26 season saw a change in ownership with American real estate developer Landon Smith purchasing the club on 31 December. This ended the near-eight year tenure of Raj Singh who had placed the club up for sale in April 2023. With three games of the season remaining, it was announced on 17 April 2026 that manager Nicky Featherstone would leave his role at the end of the season. Featherstone had been appointed in December 2025. On 14 May 2026, Lee Clark was appointed as the new head coach ahead of the 2026–27 campaign. On 14 June, he was joined by Adam Clayton as his assistant head coach who had previously played under Clark at Huddersfield Town. On 5 August, Jack Hunter was announced as the new club captain.

On 6 May, Hartlepool announced their retained list with the club releasing 13 players at the end of their contracts leaving four senior players under contract for the following season. Joe Aungiers, Adam Campbell, Matty Daly, Nathan Ferguson, Sam Folarin, Nick Hayes, Gavan Holohan, Danny Johnson, Vadaine Oliver, Louis Stephenson and Brad Walker were all released. The club also released top scorer Alex Reid and club captain Tom Parkes. Writing in the Hartlepool Mail, Richard Mennear described Hartlepool's retained list as "ruthless", adding "this season will be the biggest rebuild job yet. It has to be. And it should therefore, be a really exciting time for supporters."

Luke Charman, Jack Hunter, Adam Smith and Campbell Darcy signed new contracts to remain with the club. On 5 June, Jordan Hugill, who had previously had a successful loan spell with Hartlepool in 2015 became the club's first signing of the transfer window. Hugill had scored the winner against Exeter City in the penultimate match of the 2014–15 season which had kept Hartlepool in the Football League. The 34-year-old forward signed on a one-year deal from Rotherham United having had spells at several Championship clubs including Preston North End and Middlesbrough. Hartlepool would then sign three players in three days. On 9 June, Hartlepool signed Jack Nolan from recently relegated National League club Morecambe. The forward had scored 19 goals in the previous season. Then Hartlepool signed winger Brooklyn Ilunga from League Two winners Bromley. Next, Hartlepool signed winger Corey McKeown from Spennymoor Town.

On 25 June, Hartlepool signed midfielder Owen Hampson following his release from Sheffield United. They signed forward Chris Popov following his release from Leicester City on 27 June. Popov had played on loan at Morecambe during the second half of the previous season and had formed a partnership with fellow new signing Jack Nolan, scoring 26 goals combined.

On 27 June, Hartlepool announced the signing of forward Will Harris from FC Halifax Town. Harris had scored 22 goals in the previous National League campaign for FC Halifax. He had previously spent time on trial with Hartlepool in 2022. Writing in the Hartlepool Mail, Mark Carruthers reported that Hartlepool had fought off major competition from EFL and National League clubs for Harris' signature and described the move as "arguably their biggest signing of the summer". However, a dispute arose between FC Halifax and Hartlepool regarding the status of the player, with FC Halifax maintaining that they had triggered the option on Harris' contract before its expiration whereas Hartlepool believed this not to be the case and that he was a free agent. FC Halifax released a statement: "A one year option was exercised for an additional contract year, for which the player has been informed within the normal administrative process of the FA and importantly within the FA timescale for 2026."

On 28 June, they signed defender Charlie Penman from Brighton & Hove Albion. On 30 June, they signed 19-year-old forward Terry Bondo from Blackpool. On 2 July, they signed full-back Neo Eccleston from Huddersfield Town. On 14 July, full-back Liam Gibson was signed from Harrogate Town.

On 24 July, left back Cameron John, who had had a successful loan spell with the club in the following season signed following his release from York City. Over the next two days, Hartlepool signed two goalkeepers. Firstly, Max Merrick on loan from Chelsea and then Nathan Fisher on a free transfer from Middlesbrough.

The club announced it would participate in the National League Cup for the first time having decided not to in the previous season. Speaking to BBC Tees, Lee Clark said: "Obviously, the Club weren't in it last season and they had their reasons, but with the change around in the academy structure this year, with an Under-21 team coming into the Club and a full-time Loans Manager, we felt this was necessary."

Previewing the 2026–27 National League season in the Racing Post, Andrew Wilsher said: "Hartlepool are generally second-favourites for the title after a number of big signings, including ex-Halifax striker Will Harris, who had 22 goals last season, and winger Jack Nolan, who netted 19 times for Morecambe. However, there is a big question mark over new manager Lee Clark, who won just one of his nine games in charge of Rotherham this year, which was also his first stint in the dugout since 2022. Pools seem too big a risk at 11-2".

=== Pre-season friendlies ===
On 1 June, Hartlepool announced pre-season fixtures against: Seaton Carew, Redcar Athletic, Spennymoor Town, Hebburn Town, Grimsby Town and Fleetwood Town.

| 11 July 2026 Friendly | Seaton Carew | 0–3 | Hartlepool United | Seaton Carew |
| 15:00 | | | Harris 28'; Popov 52', 67' | Stadium: Hornby Park; Attendance: 1,008; Referee: Tony Harrington |

| 14 July 2026 Friendly | Redcar Athletic | 2–4 | Hartlepool United | Redcar |
| 19:30 | Rowe 26'; Boyes 49' | | Bondo 40'; Kouogun 43'; Donaldson 73'; Eccleston 81' | Stadium: Green Lane |

| 18 July 2026 Friendly | Spennymoor Town | 1–2 | Hartlepool United | Spennymoor |
| 15:00 | Bennett 53' | | Nolan 70', 81' (pen.) | Stadium: The Brewery Field; Attendance: 821; Referee: Andrew Miller |

| 21 July 2026 Friendly | Hebburn Town | 2–3 | Hartlepool United | Hebburn |
| 19:00 | Foreman 36'; Charles 89' | Report | Charman 17'; Kouogun 60'; Popov 66' | Stadium: Hebburn Sports & Social Ground; Attendance: 500 |

| 25 July 2026 Friendly | Hartlepool United | 0–3 | Grimsby Town | Hartlepool |
| 15:00 | | | Amaluzor 20', 51'; Cook 47' | Stadium: Victoria Park; Attendance: 2,293 |

| 1 August 2026 Friendly | Hartlepool United | 1–0 | Fleetwood Town | Hartlepool |
| 15:00 | McKeown 89' | | | Stadium: Victoria Park; Attendance: 1,332 |

== Review ==
=== August ===
Hartlepool began their 2026–27 campaign with a 2–0 home win against recently relegated Barrow. Six players made their debut in the starting lineup. Two of these debutants scored the goals – Will Harris and Jack Nolan. They played their first National League Cup match the following Tuesday, and suffered a 10–0 defeat to Middlesbrough U21s, the worst defeat in the club's history. In order to comply with the cup's regulations, Hartlepool started four first-team players before substituting them in the first minute of the match. The Hartlepool team that played the remainder of the match consisted of a mixture of Academy and U21 players. The first away match of the season ended with a 1–0 victory at Aldershot Town. Debutant Corey McKeown scored the winning goal in the 69th minute, 10 minutes after coming on as a substitute, before Aldershot missed an 88th minute penalty. Hartlepool then suffered their first league defeat of the season, losing 2–1 away at Sutton United. They went 2–0 down after 27 minutes before pulling one goal back thanks to Corey McKeown's second goal in two games, but were unable to find an equaliser in the second half. They lost 1–0 at home to Eastleigh in the following match. Neo Eccleston was sent off for Hartlepool in the 46th minute after receiving two yellow cards. Hartlepool pushed for a winner but conceded in the 97th minute.

=== September ===
On 1 September, they suffered their third consecutive defeat, losing 1–0 at FC Halifax Town. They ended their losing run thanks to a 1–0 home win against Woking with Chris Popov scoring his first Hartlepool goal. Returning to National League Cup action, Hartlepool lost 1–0 to Everton U21s.

Three further league defeats to Kidderminster Harriers, Altrincham, and Worthing followed. In the post-match press conference immediately after the 3–1 home defeat against Worthing, Lee Clark announced his resignation as head coach stating: "All I want to say is I resign from my position with immediate effect. I wanted to give this club and the fans something to be proud of, what they deserve. I haven't been able to do that unfortunately. I know what this club means, I said it at the start when I got the job. I was excited to take it and I wanted to be the man that got them back where they need to be and deserve to be. It hasn't worked out. You've heard the reaction of the supporters. I took a long time out of the game and I wasn’t going to be coming back and getting an atmosphere like that. It's not going to change and it's not nice for the family and friends to listen to that."

Coaches Adam Clayton and Gary Liddle took interim charge and oversaw a 4–1 defeat to Scunthorpe United in their first match which saw Hartlepool drop into the relegation zone. In the mid-week match, they lost 1–0 at home to Harrogate Town.

=== October ===
On 1 October, former Tranmere Rovers manager Pete Wild was announced as the new manager. He took charge of his first game two days later but suffered a 1–0 home defeat to Tamworth with Jack Nolan missing a first half penalty, their ninth defeat in ten. In Wild's second match in charge, Hartlepool ended their six-match losing run, recording a 4–2 away victory at Forest Green Rovers. Jordan Hugill scored a brace, his first goals since re-joining the club. Nathan Sheron also scored a brace to seal the points.

In the National League Cup, Wild vowed to treat the tie against Newcastle United Under-21s as a first-team game to help get his style of play across. They lost out 2–1 with Jack Nolan scoring Hartlepool's goal. In the FA Cup, Hartlepool were drawn at home to National League North side Marine in the fourth qualifying round. They were dumped out 2–0 by the lower league side.

Returning to league action, Hartlepool recorded their second successive league victory, defeating Hornchurch 2–1. They came from 1–0 down with ten men to record their victory with late goals from Will Harris and Luke Charman. In the mid-week game, Hartlepool lost out 3–1 to AFC Fylde. They lead from the third minite thanks to a Will Harris strike, but three late goals from Fylde sealed defeat. They then lost out 4–3 to runaway league leaders Boreham Wood in their final game of October. After being 2–0 down at half time, goals from Kougoun, Deeming and Miley brought Hartlepool into the lead. However, an 87th minute equaliser and stoppage time winner condemned Hartlepool to defeat.

== Players ==
=== First-team squad ===
Note: Flags indicate national team as defined under FIFA eligibility rules; some limited exceptions apply. Players may hold more than one non-FIFA nationality.

| No. | Pos. | Nation | Player |
|---|---|---|---|
| 1 | GK | ENG | Max Merrick |
| 2 | DF | ENG | Jay Benn |
| 3 | DF | ENG | Cameron John |
| 4 | MF | ENG | Jack Hunter |
| 5 | DF | CMR | Maxim Kouogun |
| 6 | DF | ENG | Reiss McNally |
| 7 | DF | ENG | Brooklyn Ilunga |
| 8 | MF | ENG | Jamie Miley |
| 9 | FW | ENG | Jordan Hugill |
| 10 | FW | ENG | Will Harris |
| 11 | FW | ENG | Luke Charman |
| 12 | DF | ENG | Neo Eccleston |
| 14 | MF | ENG | Nathan Sheron |
| 15 | DF | ENG | Charlie Penman |
| 17 | MF | ENG | Jack Nolan |
| 18 | MF | WAL | Owen Hampson |

| No. | Pos. | Nation | Player |
|---|---|---|---|
| 19 | FW | WAL | Chris Popov |
| 20 | FW | ENG | Josh Donaldson |
| 21 | MF | ENG | Charlie Thornton |
| 22 | DF | ENG | Campbell Darcy |
| 23 | DF | ENG | Noah Gilbraith |
| 24 | MF | ENG | Jacob Penprase |
| 26 | GK | ENG | Harry Conyard |
| 27 | DF | ENG | Liam Gibson |
| 28 | MF | ENG | Corey McKeown |
| 29 | FW | ENG | Kian Foreman |
| 30 | FW | ENG | Terry Bondo |
| 32 | GK | ENG | Nathan Fisher |
| 41 | GK | ENG | Adam Smith |
| 42 | MF | ENG | Cole Deeming |
| 52 | DF | ENG | Max Clark |
| 55 | DF | ENG | Samuel Lavelle |

== Transfers ==
=== Transfers in ===
| Date | Position | Name | From | Fee | Ref. |
|---|---|---|---|---|---|
| 5 June 2026 | FW | Jordan Hugill | Rotherham United | Free | |
| 9 June 2026 | MF | Jack Nolan | Morecambe | Free | |
| 10 June 2026 | DF | Brooklyn Ilunga | Bromley | Free | |
| 11 June 2026 | MF | Corey McKeown | Spennymoor Town | Free | |
| 25 June 2026 | MF | Owen Hampson | Sheffield United | Free | |
| 27 June 2026 | FW | Chris Popov | Leicester City | Free | |
| 27 June 2026 | FW | Will Harris | FC Halifax Town | Free | |
| 28 June 2026 | DF | Charlie Penman | Brighton & Hove Albion | Free | |
| 30 June 2026 | FW | Terry Bondo | Blackpool | Free | |
| 2 July 2026 | DF | Neo Eccleston | Huddersfield Town | Free | |
| 14 July 2026 | DF | Liam Gibson | Harrogate Town | Free | |
| 24 July 2026 | DF | Cameron John | York City | Free | |
| 26 July 2026 | GK | Nathan Fisher | Middlesbrough | Free | |
| 29 September 2026 | GK | Max Thompson | Newcastle United | Free | |
| 9 October 2026 | DF | Max Clark | Gillingham | Free | |

=== Loans in ===
| Date | Position | Player | From | End date | Ref |
|---|---|---|---|---|---|
| 25 July 2026 | GK | Max Merrick | Chelsea | 30 June 2027 | |
| 4 September 2026 | MF | Cole Deeming | West Bromwich Albion | 2 January 2027 | |
| 8 October 2026 | MF | Jack Earing | Barrow | 7 November 2026 | |
| 13 October 2026 | DF | Samuel Lavelle | Grimsby Town | 10 December 2026 | |

=== Loans out ===
| Date | Position | Player | To | End date | Ref |
|---|---|---|---|---|---|
| 14 July 2026 | FW | Kian Foreman | Hebburn Town | 20 October 2026 | |
| 18 July 2026 | FW | Josh Donaldson | Hebburn Town | 4 January 2027 | |
| 30 July 2026 | DF | Campbell Darcy | Spennymoor Town | 4 September 2026 | |
| 16 September 2026 | DF | Noah Gilbraith | Guisborough Town | 16 October 2026 | |
| 20 October 2026 | DF | Campbell Darcy | Hebburn Town | 4 January 2027 | |
| 29 October 2026 | FW | Kian Foreman | Stockton Town | 29 January 2027 | |
| 12 November 2026 | DF | Noah Gilbraith | Guisborough Town | 4 January 2027 | |
| 13 November 2026 | GK | Harry Conyard | Guisborough Town | 4 January 2027 | |
| 18 November 2026 | MF | Jacob Penprase | Thornaby | 16 December 2026 | |

=== Transfers out ===
| Date | Position | Name | To | Fee | Ref |
|---|---|---|---|---|---|
| 12 May 2026 | MF | Gavan Holohan | Boston United | Free | |
| 20 May 2026 | DF | Louis Stephenson | Spennymoor Town | Free | |
| 1 June 2026 | FW | Alex Reid | Barrow | Free | |
| 9 June 2026 | GK | Nick Hayes | Aldershot Town | Free | |
| 13 June 2026 | MF | Matty Daly | Morecambe | Free | |
| 16 June 2026 | FW | Sam Folarin | Sutton United | Free | |
| 23 June 2026 | MF | Nathan Ferguson | Hornchurch | Free | |
| 26 June 2026 | DF | Tom Parkes | Tamworth | Free | |
| 30 June 2026 | FW | Joe Aungiers | Billingham Town | Free | |
| 30 June 2026 | FW | Vadaine Oliver | | Free | |
| 9 July 2026 | FW | Adam Campbell | South Shields | Free | |
| 10 July 2026 | FW | Danny Johnson | Spennymoor Town | Free | |
| 15 August 2026 | MF | Brad Walker | Darlington | Free | |
| 13 November 2026 | GK | Max Thompson | Gateshead | Free | |

== Competitions ==
=== National League ===
==== Results summary ====
| Overall | | | | | | | | Home | | | | | | Away | | | | | |
| Pld | W | D | L | GF | GA | GD | Pts | W | D | L | GF | GA | GD | W | D | L | GF | GA | GD |
|---|---|---|---|---|---|---|---|---|---|---|---|---|---|---|---|---|---|---|---|
| 18 | 6 | 1 | 11 | 21 | 29 | −8 | 19 | 3 | 1 | 4 | 7 | 8 | −1 | 3 | 0 | 7 | 14 | 21 | −7 |

==== Results by matchday ====
| Round | 1 | 2 | 3 | 4 | 5 | 6 | 7 | 8 | 9 | 10 | 11 | 12 | 13 | 14 | 15 | 16 | 17 | 18 | 19 | 20 | 21 | 22 | 23 | 24 | 25 | 26 | 27 | 28 | 29 | 30 | 31 | 32 | 33 | 34 | 35 | 36 | 37 | 38 | 39 | 40 | 41 | 42 | 43 | 44 | 45 | 46 |
|---|---|---|---|---|---|---|---|---|---|---|---|---|---|---|---|---|---|---|---|---|---|---|---|---|---|---|---|---|---|---|---|---|---|---|---|---|---|---|---|---|---|---|---|---|---|---|
| Ground | H | A | A | H | A | H | A | A | H | A | H | H | A | H | A | A | H | A | H | H | A | H | A | H | A | A | H | H | A | A | H | H | A | A | H | H | A | H | A | H | H | A | H | A | H | A |
| Result | W | W | L | L | L | W | L | L | L | L | L | L | W | W | L | L | D | W | | | | | | | | | | | | | | | | | | | | | | | | | | | | |
| Position | 5 | 5 | 5 | 12 | 14 | 11 | 12 | 16 | 19 | 21 | 21 | 22 | 20 | 19 | 20 | 21 | 21 | 19 | | | | | | | | | | | | | | | | | | | | | | | | | | | | |

Source: InTheMadCrowd
A = Away; H = Home; W = Win; D = Draw; L = Loss

==== Matches ====
On 10 July, Hartlepool's National League fixtures were released for the following season.

| 8 August 2026 1 | Hartlepool United | 2–0 | Barrow | Hartlepool |
| 15:00 | Harris 39'; Nolan 85' | Report | | Stadium: Victoria Park; Attendance: 5,830; Referee: Callum Jones |

| 15 August 2026 2 | Aldershot Town | 0–1 | Hartlepool United | Aldershot |
| 15:00 | | Report | McKeown 69' | Stadium: Recreation Ground; Attendance: 2,865; Referee: Lewis Smith |

| 22 August 2026 3 | Sutton United | 2–1 | Hartlepool United | Sutton |
| 12:30 | Babalola 20'; Osadebe 27' | Report | McKeown 34' | Stadium: Gander Green Lane; Attendance: 1,834; Referee: Oliver Mackey |

| 28 August 2026 4 | Hartlepool United | 0–1 | Eastleigh | Hartlepool |
| 19:45 | | Report | Khumbeni 90' | Stadium: Victoria Park; Attendance: 5,017; Referee: Dale Baines |

| 1 September 2026 5 | FC Halifax Town | 1–0 | Hartlepool United | Halifax |
| 19:45 | Hugill 53' | Report | | Stadium: The Shay; Attendance: 1,814; Referee: Andrew Miller |

| 5 September 2026 6 | Hartlepool United | 1–0 | Woking | Hartlepool |
| 15:00 | Popov 57' | Report | | Stadium: Victoria Park; Attendance: 4,213; Referee: Callum Walchester |

| 11 September 2026 7 | Kidderminster Harriers | 2–0 | Hartlepool United | Kidderminster |
| 19:45 | Eccleston 35' (o.g.); Stewart 85' | Report | | Stadium: Aggborough Stadium; Attendance: 3,143; Referee: Jamie Robinson |

| 16 September 2026 8 | Altrincham | 2–1 | Hartlepool United | Altrincham |
| 19:45 | Hemmings 28' (pen.); Crawford 81' | Report | Miley 43' | Stadium: Moss Lane; Attendance: 1,466; Referee: Declan Brown |

| 19 September 2026 9 | Hartlepool United | 1–3 | Worthing | Hartlepool |
| 15:00 | Harris 77' | Report | Adjetey-Brew 35'; Aguiar 59'; Marquez 90' | Stadium: Victoria Park; Attendance: 3,920; Referee: Harrison Blair |

| 26 September 2026 10 | Scunthorpe United | 4–1 | Hartlepool United | Scunthorpe |
| 15:00 | Jones 30'; Norwood 45'; Hurst 48'; Parker 68' | Report | Harris 27' | Stadium: Glanford Park; Attendance: 4,883; Referee: William Davis |

| 29 September 2026 11 | Hartlepool United | 0–1 | Harrogate Town | Hartlepool |
| 19:45 | | Report | Hobson 55' | Stadium: Victoria Park; Attendance: 4,041; Referee: Jamie O'Connor |

| 3 October 2026 12 | Hartlepool United | 0–1 | Tamworth | Hartlepool |
| 15:00 | | Report | Donnelly 42' | Stadium: Victoria Park; Attendance: 4,219; Referee: Aaron Jackson |

| 10 October 2026 13 | Forest Green Rovers | 2–4 | Hartlepool United | Nailsworth |
| 17:30 | Patrick 65'; McAllister 70' (pen.) | Report | Hugill 45' (pen.), 57'; Sheron 48', 87' | Stadium: The New Lawn; Attendance: 1,755; Referee: James Oldham |

| 24 October 2026 14 | Hartlepool United | 2–1 | Hornchurch | Hartlepool |
| 15:00 | Harris 72'; Charman 80' | Report | Balanta 46' | Stadium: Victoria Park; Attendance: 3,703; Referee: Leigh Doughty |

| 27 October 2026 15 | AFC Fylde | 3–1 | Hartlepool United | Medlar-with-Wesham |
| 19:45 | McCormick 77', 90'; Matthews-Lewis 81' | Report | Harris 3' | Stadium: Mill Farm; Attendance: 1,017; Referee: Zac Kennard-Kettle |

| 31 October 2026 16 | Boreham Wood | 4–3 | Hartlepool United | Borehamwood |
| 15:00 | Cashman 20' (pen.); White 45'; Brunt 87'; Rush 90' | Report | Kouogun 47'; Deeming 52'; Miley 59' | Stadium: Meadow Park; Attendance: 1,268; Referee: Daniel Blades |

| 14 November 2026 17 | Hartlepool United | 1–1 | Wealdstone | Hartlepool |
| 15:00 | Ilunga 79' | Report | McNally 90' (o.g.) | Stadium: Victoria Park; Attendance: 4,017; Referee: Richard Aspinall |

| 21 November 2026 18 | Gateshead | 1–2 | Hartlepool United | Gateshead |
| 15:00 | Williams 72' | Report | Harris 56'; Hugill 83' | Stadium: Gateshead International Stadium; Attendance: 1,589; Referee: Aaron Bannister |

| 25 November 2026 19 | Hartlepool United | v | Solihull Moors | Hartlepool |
| 15:00 | | | | Stadium: Victoria Park |

| 28 November 2026 20 | Hartlepool United | v | Southend United | Hartlepool |
| 17:30 | | | | Stadium: Victoria Park |

| 5 December 2026 21 | Yeovil Town | v | Hartlepool United | Yeovil |
| 15:00 | | | | Stadium: Huish Park |

| 8 December 2026 22 | Hartlepool United | v | Forest Green Rovers | Hartlepool |
| 19:45 | | | | Stadium: Victoria Park |

| 19 December 2026 23 | Tamworth | v | Hartlepool United | Tamworth |
| 19:45 | | | | Stadium: The Lamb Ground |

| 26 December 2026 24 | Hartlepool United | v | Boston United | Hartlepool |
| 15:00 | | | | Stadium: Victoria Park |

| 28 December 2026 25 | Carlisle United | v | Hartlepool United | Carlisle |
| 15:00 | | | | Stadium: Brunton Park |

| 2 January 2027 26 | Hornchurch | v | Hartlepool United | Upminster |
| 15:00 | | | | Stadium: Hornchurch Stadium |

| 9 January 2027 27 | Hartlepool United | v | AFC Fylde | Hartlepool |
| 12:30 | | | | Stadium: Victoria Park |

| 23 January 2027 28 | Hartlepool United | v | Aldershot Town | Hartlepool |
| 15:00 | | | | Stadium: Victoria Park |

| 26 January 2027 29 | Solihull Moors | v | Hartlepool United | Solihull |
| 19:45 | | | | Stadium: Damson Park |

| 30 January 2027 30 | Barrow | v | Hartlepool United | Barrow-in-Furness |
| 15:00 | | | | Stadium: Holker Street |

| 6 February 2027 31 | Hartlepool United | v | Gateshead | Hartlepool |
| 15:00 | | | | Stadium: Victoria Park |

| 13 February 2027 32 | Hartlepool United | v | Scunthorpe United | Hartlepool |
| 15:00 | | | | Stadium: Victoria Park |

| 16 February 2027 33 | Harrogate Town | v | Hartlepool United | Harrogate |
| 19:45 | | | | Stadium: Wetherby Road |

| 20 February 2027 34 | Worthing | v | Hartlepool United | Worthing |
| 15:00 | | | | Stadium: Woodside Road |

| 23 February 2027 35 | Hartlepool United | v | Altrincham | Hartlepool |
| 19:45 | | | | Stadium: Victoria Park |

| 27 February 2027 36 | Hartlepool United | v | Sutton United | Hartlepool |
| 15:00 | | | | Stadium: Victoria Park |

| 6 March 2027 37 | Eastleigh | v | Hartlepool United | Eastleigh |
| 15:00 | | | | Stadium: Ten Acres |

| 10 March 2027 38 | Hartlepool United | v | FC Halifax Town | Hartlepool |
| 19:45 | | | | Stadium: Victoria Park |

| 13 March 2027 39 | Woking | v | Hartlepool United | Woking |
| 15:00 | | | | Stadium: Kingfield Stadium |

| 20 March 2027 40 | Hartlepool United | v | Kidderminster Harriers | Hartlepool |
| 15:00 | | | | Stadium: Victoria Park |

| 26 March 2027 41 | Hartlepool United | v | Carlisle United | Hartlepool |
| 15:00 | | | | Stadium: Victoria Park |

| 29 March 2027 42 | Boston United | v | Hartlepool United | Boston |
| 15:00 | | | | Stadium: Boston Community Stadium |

| 3 April 2027 43 | Hartlepool United | v | Boreham Wood | Hartlepool |
| 15:00 | | | | Stadium: Victoria Park |

| 10 April 2027 44 | Wealdstone | v | Hartlepool United | Ruislip |
| 15:00 | | | | Stadium: Grosvenor Vale |

| 17 April 2027 45 | Hartlepool United | v | Yeovil Town | Hartlepool |
| 15:00 | | | | Stadium: Victoria Park |

| 24 April 2027 46 | Southend United | v | Hartlepool United | Southend-on-Sea |
| 12:30 | | | | Stadium: Roots Hall |

=== FA Cup ===
| 17 October 2026 Fourth qualifying round | Hartlepool United | 0–2 | Marine | Hartlepool |
| 15:00 | | Report | Doyle 71'; Potter 77' | Stadium: Victoria Park; Attendance: 1,935; Referee: David Richardson |

=== National League Cup ===
On 5 August, Hartlepool were drawn into Group C of the National League Cup.

| 11 August 2026 Group stage | Hartlepool United | 0–10 | Middlesbrough | Hartlepool |
| 15:00 | | Report | Coulson 5', 50', 70', 90'; Campbell 8', 52'; Tika-Lemba 37'; James 54'; Kakai 60'; Harrison 65' | Stadium: Victoria Park; Referee: Stuart Morland |

| 8 September 2026 Group stage | Hartlepool United | 0–1 | Everton | Hartlepool |
| 19:20 | | Report | Lambert 9' | Stadium: Victoria Park; Attendance: 205; Referee: James Westgate |

| 13 October 2026 Group stage | Hartlepool United | 1–2 | Newcastle United | Hartlepool |
| 19:00 | Nolan 26' | Report | Thompson 9'; McNally 35' (o.g.) | Stadium: Victoria Park; Attendance: 578; Referee: Paul Marsden |

| 3 November 2026 Group stage | Hartlepool United | 3–1 | Leeds United | Hartlepool |
| 19:00 | Bondo 25' (pen.), 70'; Popov 28' | Report | Hodja 75' | Stadium: Victoria Park; Attendance: 250; Referee: Andrew Miller |

== Appearances and goals ==
=== Appearances and goals ===
| No. | Pos | Nat | Player | Total | | National League | | FA Cup | | Other | |
| No. | Pos | Nat | Player | Apps | Goals | Apps | Goals | Apps | Goals | Apps | Goals |
|---|---|---|---|---|---|---|---|---|---|---|---|
| 1 | GK | (England) ENG | Max Merrick | 9 | 0 | 9 | 0 | 0 | 0 | 0 | 0 |
| 2 | DF | (England) ENG | Jay Benn | 10 | 0 | 10 | 0 | 0 | 0 | 0 | 0 |
| 3 | DF | (England) ENG | Cameron John | 11 | 0 | 10 | 0 | 1 | 0 | 0 | 0 |
| 4 | MF | (England) ENG | Jack Hunter | 16 | 0 | 14 | 0 | 0 | 0 | 2 | 0 |
| 5 | DF | (Cameroon) CMR | Maxim Kouogun | 10 | 1 | 9 | 1 | 0 | 0 | 1 | 0 |
| 6 | DF | (England) ENG | Reiss McNally | 20 | 0 | 18 | 0 | 1 | 0 | 1 | 0 |
| 7 | DF | (England) ENG | Brooklyn Ilunga | 22 | 1 | 18 | 1 | 1 | 0 | 3 | 0 |
| 8 | MF | (England) ENG | Jamie Miley | 18 | 2 | 17 | 2 | 1 | 0 | 0 | 0 |
| 9 | FW | (England) ENG | Jordan Hugill | 19 | 3 | 17 | 3 | 1 | 0 | 1 | 0 |
| 10 | FW | (England) ENG | Will Harris | 21 | 6 | 18 | 6 | 1 | 0 | 2 | 0 |
| 11 | FW | (England) ENG | Luke Charman | 10 | 1 | 9 | 1 | 0 | 0 | 1 | 0 |
| 12 | DF | (England) ENG | Neo Eccleston | 15 | 0 | 11 | 0 | 1 | 0 | 3 | 0 |
| 14 | MF | (England) ENG | Nathan Sheron | 19 | 2 | 17 | 2 | 1 | 0 | 1 | 0 |
| 15 | DF | (England) ENG | Charlie Penman | 6 | 0 | 2 | 0 | 0 | 0 | 4 | 0 |
| 17 | MF | (England) ENG | Jack Nolan | 20 | 2 | 17 | 1 | 1 | 0 | 2 | 1 |
| 19 | FW | (Wales) WAL | Chris Popov | 21 | 2 | 16 | 1 | 1 | 0 | 4 | 1 |
| 21 | MF | (England) ENG | Charlie Thornton | 10 | 0 | 6 | 0 | 1 | 0 | 3 | 0 |
| 22 | DF | (England) ENG | Campbell Darcy | 4 | 0 | 1 | 0 | 0 | 0 | 3 | 0 |
| 27 | DF | (England) ENG | Liam Gibson | 10 | 0 | 8 | 0 | 0 | 0 | 2 | 0 |
| 28 | MF | (England) ENG | Corey McKeown | 3 | 2 | 3 | 2 | 0 | 0 | 0 | 0 |
| 30 | FW | (England) ENG | Terry Bondo | 13 | 2 | 9 | 0 | 1 | 0 | 3 | 2 |
| 32 | GK | (England) ENG | Nathan Fisher | 9 | 0 | 6 | 0 | 0 | 0 | 3 | 0 |
| 41 | GK | (England) ENG | Adam Smith | 1 | 0 | 1 | 0 | 0 | 0 | 0 | 0 |
| 42 | MF | (England) ENG | Cole Deeming | 14 | 1 | 13 | 1 | 1 | 0 | 0 | 0 |
| 51 | MF | (England) ENG | Jack Earing | 1 | 0 | 1 | 0 | 0 | 0 | 0 | 0 |
| 52 | DF | (England) ENG | Max Clark | 8 | 0 | 6 | 0 | 1 | 0 | 1 | 0 |
| 53 | GK | (England) ENG | Max Thompson | 4 | 0 | 3 | 0 | 1 | 0 | 0 | 0 |
| 55 | DF | (England) ENG | Samuel Lavelle | 6 | 0 | 4 | 0 | 1 | 0 | 1 | 0 |

=== Goalscorers ===
| Rank | Name | National League | FA Cup | Other | Total |
|---|---|---|---|---|---|
| 1 | Will Harris | 6 | 0 | 0 | 6 |
| 2 | Jordan Hugill | 3 | 0 | 0 | 3 |
| 3 | Terry Bondo | 0 | 0 | 2 | 2 |
| 3 | Corey McKeown | 2 | 0 | 0 | 2 |
| 3 | Jamie Miley | 2 | 0 | 0 | 2 |
| 3 | Jack Nolan | 1 | 0 | 1 | 2 |
| 3 | Chris Popov | 1 | 0 | 1 | 2 |
| 3 | Nathan Sheron | 2 | 0 | 0 | 2 |
| 4 | Luke Charman | 1 | 0 | 0 | 1 |
| 4 | Cole Deeming | 1 | 0 | 0 | 1' |
| 4 | Brooklyn Ilunga | 1 | 0 | 0 | 1 |
| 4 | Maxim Kouogun | 1 | 0 | 0 | 1 |

=== Clean sheets ===
| Rank | Name | National League | FA Cup | Other | Total |
|---|---|---|---|---|---|
| 1 | Max Merrick | 3 | 0 | 0 | 3 |
| 2 | Nathan Fisher | 1 | 0 | 0 | 1 |

== See also ==
- History of Hartlepool United F.C.
- List of Hartlepool United F.C. seasons
