= Jordan Hugill =

English footballer

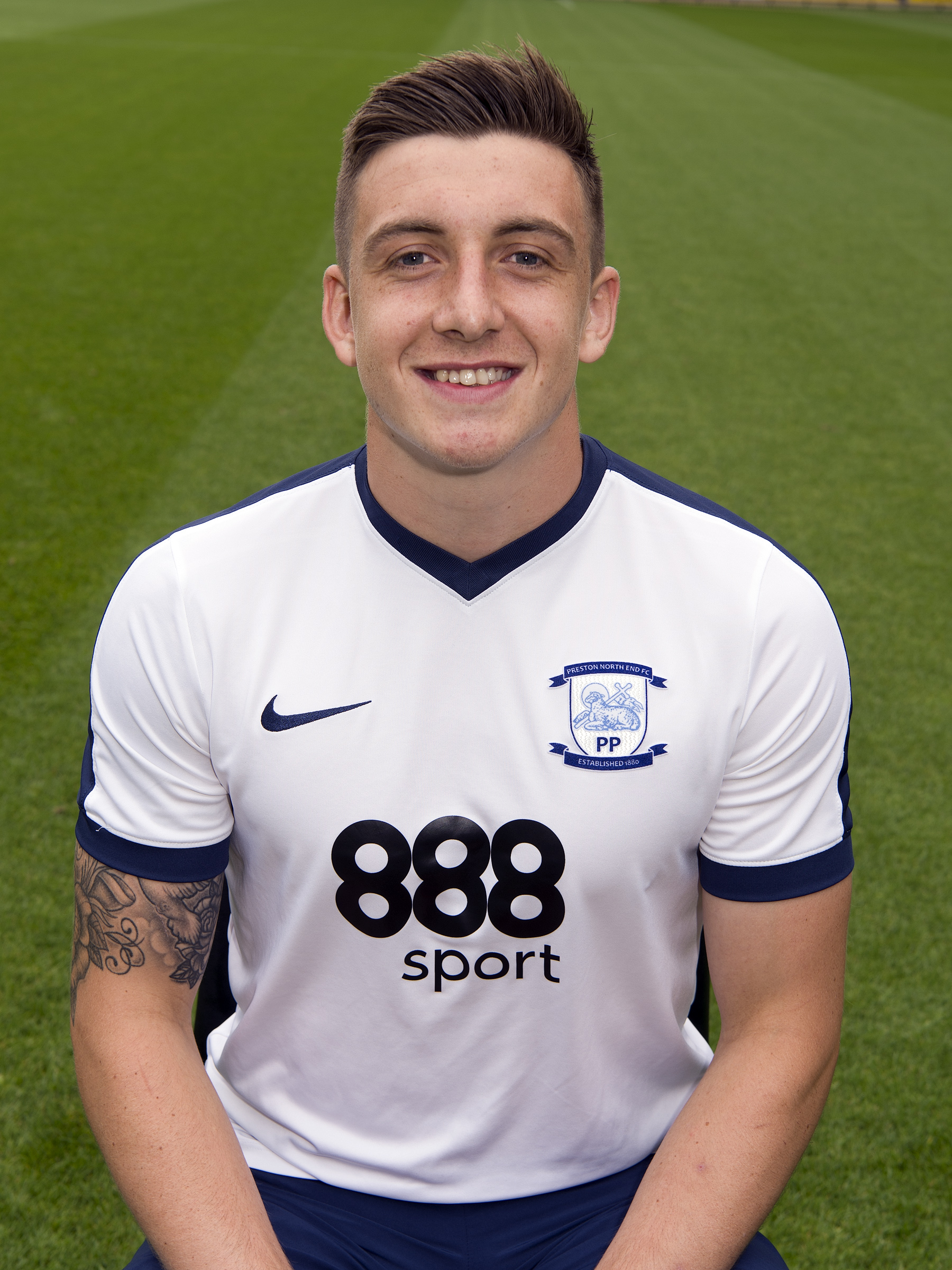
- Hugill with Preston North End in 2016

Personal information
- Full name: Jordan Thomas Hugill
- Date of birth: 4 June 1992 (age 34)
- Place of birth: Middlesbrough, England
- Height: 5 ft 11 in (1.80 m)
- Position: Forward

Team information
- Current team: Hartlepool United
- Number: 9

Youth career
- 2007–2008: Marske United

Senior career*
Years	Team	Apps	(Gls)
2008–2009	Seaham Red Star		
2009–2010	Consett		
2011	Jerez Industrial	15	(2)
2011–2012	Whitby Town	3	(1)
2012	→ Marske United (loan)		
2013–2014	Port Vale	20	(4)
2013	→ Gateshead (loan)	7	(5)
2014–2018	Preston North End	103	(23)
2015	→ Tranmere Rovers (loan)	6	(1)
2015	→ Hartlepool United (loan)	8	(4)
2018–2020	West Ham United	3	(0)
2018–2019	→ Middlesbrough (loan)	37	(6)
2019–2020	→ Queens Park Rangers (loan)	39	(13)
2020–2023	Norwich City	38	(4)
2021–2022	→ West Bromwich Albion (loan)	20	(1)
2022	→ Cardiff City (loan)	18	(4)
2023–2026	Rotherham United	113	(13)
2026–	Hartlepool United	17	(3)
- * Club domestic league appearances and goals as of 23:13, 21 November 2026 (UTC)

Jordan Thomas Hugill (born 4 June 1992) is an English professional footballer who plays as a forward for National League club Hartlepool United.

A relative latecomer to the professional game, he had spells with non-League sides Seaham Red Star, Consett, Whitby Town and Marske United, and also spent time at the then Glenn Hoddle Academy club Jerez Industrial in Spain. He was signed by Port Vale in June 2013 and made his debut for the club four months later following a productive loan spell at Gateshead. He signed with Preston North End in June 2014. He was loaned out to Tranmere Rovers in February 2015 and then Hartlepool United the following month. Premier League West Ham United signed him in January 2018 for an undisclosed fee. He returned to the Championship the following transfer window in a season-long loan to Middlesbrough and was then loaned to Queens Park Rangers for the 2019–20 season. He was sold to Norwich City for a fee of up to £5 million in August 2020 and helped the club to win the Championship title in the 2020–21 season. He joined West Bromwich Albion on loan for the first half of the 2021–22 season. He spent the second half of the campaign on loan at Cardiff City before joining Rotherham United on a permanent deal in January 2023. He joined National League club Hartlepool United in June 2026.

== Career ==
=== Early career ===
Hugill, who was a pupil at Nunthorpe School, attended George Smith's academy in Hemlington from the age of nine. He began his career with Northern League club Seaham Red Star at the age of 16 and was due to go on trial at Sunderland before he was struck down with an ankle injury in September 2009. He later moved on to Consett, but left his contract in August 2010 to spend two years at the Glenn Hoddle Academy in Spain.

He signed with Whitby Town in December 2011 and scored in his debut game against Nantwich Town, only to damage his anterior cruciate ligament (ACL) later in the match and spend the next ten months out injured. He joined Marske United in October 2012 initially on loan so as to regain match fitness. His last appearance for Marske came in the final of the North Riding Senior Cup, where they were beaten 3–0 by Pickering Town. During his time at the club he worked as a barman at the Dickens Inn in Middlesbrough.

=== Port Vale ===
Hugill signed with League One club Port Vale in June 2013. He was loaned out to Gateshead of the Conference Premier on 20 September 2013. "Tynesiders" boss Gary Mills stated that Hugill was a "talented... goalscorer" and put him in the starting line-up for the next match. He scored his first goal for the club on 24 September in a 3–2 win over Chester at the Gateshead International Stadium. He finished his loan spell with five goals in four starts and three substitute appearances.

He made his debut for the "Valiants" on 22 October, and played the first 75 minutes of a 3–0 victory over Crawley Town. He performed well on his debut, justifying his manager's surprise decision to play him alongside fellow Glenn Hoddle Academy graduate Ben Williamson in place of established strikers Tom Pope and Lee Hughes.

First of all you have to say well done to our chief scout, George Foster, who spotted his potential playing in non-League. We had him with us last season and the one thing he struggled with was his fitness. Pre-season was a struggle for him as well. He is a big old boy, not used to a professional pre-season, but is one of those lads who never gives up. You ask him to pull out of things and he doesn't want to do that.

— Port Vale manager Micky Adams describing Hugill in October 2013.

He scored his first Football League goal on 16 November, scoring the final goal of a 3–1 victory over Shrewsbury Town at Vale Park; after the match Adams said that the club had "unearthed a gem" in Hugill. Hugill continued to turn out for the first-team, but admitted that he needed to work on his fitness to play a full 90 minutes of professional football. At the end of the 2013–14 campaign he was named as the club's Young Player of the Year, and also featured in Vale's Staffordshire Senior Cup final defeat to Rushall Olympic. However, in the summer Micky Adams confirmed that Hugill had rejected the club's offer of a new contract, and stated: "It is disappointing ... we spent a lot of time and effort with Jordan last season, but we will have to accept it." The club were forced to sell him for a cheap price, though Adams successfully negotiated a 20% sell on clause that would net the club a £1.8 million windfall.

=== Preston North End ===
Hugill signed a two-year contract with League One club Preston North End in June 2014, who paid Port Vale an undisclosed fee; manager Simon Grayson stated that "he's young, he's raring to go, hungry, he's a strong, powerful player, and he's got many attributes that will help us along the way this season and complement the squad well". He had an eventful match after coming on for Andrew Little as a 20th-minute substitute at Walsall on 13 September; he provided an assist for Joe Garner before being sent off for clashing with opposition defender Andy Butler, he also picked up an injury in the game that required surgery and a lengthy spell on the sidelines. He returned to fitness in February 2015, at which point he joined his former Vale manager Micky Adams at League Two side Tranmere Rovers for a one-month loan spell.

On 26 March 2015, loan deadline day, Hugill signed for bottom-placed League Two club Hartlepool United on loan until the end of the season; "Pools" boss Ronnie Moore said that "It just didn't work at Tranmere. But we've seen a lot of him and he'll go straight in and get goals for us, no doubt about it". He scored four goals in eight games for the club, including the winning goal against Exeter City at Victoria Park that secured Hartlepool's place in the English Football League. He was an unused substitute at Wembley in the play-off final as Preston won promotion into the Championship.

He signed a new two-and-a-half-year contract in October 2015. He ended the 2015–16 campaign with five goals in 32 games. He continued to impress in the 2016–17 season and was given another new two-and-a-half-year contract in September 2016. The club rejected an offer of £1.5 million from Ipswich Town in January 2017. He ended the 2016–17 season with 13 goals in 47 appearances to end up as Preston's top-scorer. He started the 2017–18 season in good form and was linked with several clubs in the summer transfer window. He handed in a transfer request on 29 August 2017.

=== West Ham United ===
On 31 January 2018, Hugill completed a deadline day signing for Premier League club West Ham United in a reported £10 million transfer deal, becoming manager David Moyes' second signing at the London Stadium. However, he was restricted to a handful of brief cameos in the second half of the 2017–18 season, playing just 22 minutes in total.

==== Middlesbrough loan ====
On 8 August 2018, Hugill returned to the Championship on a season-long loan to Middlesbrough. On 10 November, he opened his league account for the club by scoring both goals in a 2–0 win over Wigan Athletic at the Riverside Stadium. He was subsequently named on the EFL Team of the Week. He battled with Britt Assombalonga for the role as target man striker and scored seven goals in 41 appearances during the 2018–19 season as Tony Pulis's "Boro" side missed out on the play-offs by one point.

==== QPR loan ====
On 28 July 2019, Hugill joined Championship side Queens Park Rangers on loan for the 2019–20 season. Manager Mark Warburton said he hoped Hugill would "lead the line" and link up well with fellow loanee striker Jan Mlakar. He scored on his "Hoops" debut on 3 August as they recorded a season opening 2–1 victory at Stoke City. He ended the season with 15 goals in 41 appearances throughout the 2019–20 campaign.

=== Norwich City ===
After two loan spells and just three appearances, amounting to 22 minutes of playing time for West Ham, on 24 August 2020, he joined recently relegated Championship team Norwich City for a fee "that could be worth £5m". He signed a three-year contract and was given the club's number nine shirt. He scored his first goal for the "Canaries", a late penalty, in a 2–1 win at Rotherham United on 17 October. A hamstring injury meant he was limited to just seven league starts in the 2020–21 season. However, he still scored five goals from 34 appearances in all competitions as Norwich secured promotion back to the Premier League as Championship title winners. Manager Daniel Farke said that Hugill was "a key player for me... I don't just rate a player because of his minutes and his impact on the pitch. You don't win a title or promotion just as 11 players. A leader in our dressing room and one of the main topics why we were promoted". However, Hugill failed to displace Teemu Pukki and Josh Sargent in the starting eleven and was sidelined under first Dean Smith and then David Wagner.

==== West Brom loan ====
Hugill once again returned to the Championship on loan after being promoted into the Premier League, joining West Bromwich Albion on loan for the 2021–22 season on 25 August. He scored his first goal for the club in a 3–0 victory over Bristol City at The Hawthorns on 23 October. However, this was his only goal from his first 20 appearances for the "Baggies", leading to speculation that he would be recalled to Norwich following West Brom's decision to sign American striker Daryl Dike. He later said that he felt head coach Valérien Ismaël did not really want him at the club, which caused his confidence to drop. Hugill was recalled to Norwich City on 29 January 2022 as West Brom completed the signings of both Daryl Dike from Orlando City and free agent Andy Carroll.

==== Cardiff City loan ====
On 30 January 2022, Hugill returned to the Championship to join Cardiff City on loan until the end of the 2021–22 season. His debut came at the Cardiff City Stadium later that same day, and he scored the opening goal in a 2–1 win over Nottingham Forest. He had an enjoyable spell with Steve Morison's "Bluebirds", helping the team to avoid relegation, in contrast to his time at West Brom where he was frozen out of the first-team and forced to train alone.

=== Rotherham United ===
On 25 January 2023, Hugill joined fellow Championship club Rotherham United on a three-and-a-half-year deal after being signed for an undisclosed fee. He failed to find the net in his first six games for the "Millers", but was praised by manager Matt Taylor for his all round contribution to the team. He did though challenge Hugill to work on becoming a bigger threat in set-pieces. He scored five goals in 18 games in the second half of the 2022–23 season, scoring braces against former clubs Queens Park Rangers and West Bromwich Albion.

He struggled with knee problems in the 2023–24 pre-season. He went on a goal drought form October as Leam Richardson's team struggled at the foot of the table and he again suffered with a knee problem. He scored a brace in a 5–2 win over former club Cardiff City on the final day of the season as Rotherham exited the Championship. He scored five goals from 35 games in the 2024–25 campaign.

He was praised as "fantastic" by manager Matt Hamshaw in October 2025. The next month, Hamshaw also praised his willingness to play through injury as Hugill was the only frontman able to play against Reading despite suffering from a heavily bruised ankle. Hamshaw lamented that a half-fit Hugill was his only attacking option in December, saying that it was unfair to risk the striker's long-term wellness and short-term form. Hugill himself sustained an injury, requiring surgery on a knee injury picked up in January and spending over seven weeks on the sidelines. He scored two goals in 35 games over the course of the 2025–26 season, which culminated in relegation. He was released upon the expiry of his contract.

=== Hartlepool United ===
On 5 June 2026, Hugill signed a one-year contract with Hartlepool United, now in the National League. Manager Lee Clark said he signed him not only for his skills on the pitch, but for his impact off the pitch and in the dressing room. He made his first appearance in his second spell on the opening match of the 2026–27 season, coming on as a second half substitute in a 2–0 home win against Barrow. On 10 October, he scored a brace in a 4–2 away victory at Forest Green Rovers, his first goals since re-joining the club.

== Style of play ==
Hugill is a target man forward, has great strength and can out-muscle opposition defenders. Former Port Vale teammate Tom Pope stated that Hugill had an excellent attitude and "was desperate to learn and improve".

== Career statistics ==
As of match played 21 November 2026

Appearances and goals by club, season and competition
Club	Season	League			FA Cup		League Cup		Other		Total	
Club	Season	Division	Apps	Goals	Apps	Goals	Apps	Goals	Apps	Goals	Apps	Goals
Jerez Industrial	2010–11	Tercera División	15	2	0	0	—		0	0	15	2
Whitby Town	2011–12	NPL Premier Division	2	1	0	0	—		0	0	2	1
Whitby Town	2012–13	NPL Premier Division	1	0	1	0	—		0	0	2	0
Whitby Town	Total		3	1	1	0	—		0	0	4	1
Port Vale	2013–14	League One	20	4	4	1	0	0	0	0	24	5
Gateshead (loan)	2013–14	Conference Premier	7	5	—		—		—		7	5
Preston North End	2014–15	League One	3	0	0	0	2	1	1 (Note: Appearance in the Football League Trophy / EFL Trophy)	1	6	2
Preston North End	2015–16	Championship	29	3	1	0	2	2	—		32	5
Preston North End	2016–17	Championship	44	12	1	0	2	1	—		47	13
Preston North End	2017–18	Championship	27	8	1	0	1	2	—		29	10
Preston North End	Total		103	23	3	0	7	6	1	1	114	30
Tranmere Rovers (loan)	2014–15	League Two	6	1	—		—		—		6	1
Hartlepool United (loan)	2014–15	League Two	8	4	—		—		—		8	4
West Ham United	2017–18	Premier League	3	0	—		—		—		3	0
West Ham United	2018–19	Premier League	0	0	0	0	0	0	—		0	0
West Ham United	2019–20	Premier League	0	0	0	0	0	0	—		0	0
West Ham United	Total		3	0	0	0	0	0	0	0	3	0
Middlesbrough (loan)	2018–19	Championship	37	6	1	0	3	1	—		41	7
Queens Park Rangers (loan)	2019–20	Championship	39	13	2	2	0	0	—		41	15
Norwich City	2020–21	Championship	31	4	2	1	1	0	—		34	5
Norwich City	2021–22	Premier League	0	0	0	0	0	0	—		0	0
Norwich City	2022–23	Championship	7	0	1	0	2	1	—		10	1
Norwich City	Total		38	4	3	1	3	1	0	0	44	6
West Bromwich Albion (loan)	2021–22	Championship	20	1	0	0	—		—		20	1
Cardiff City (loan)	2021–22	Championship	18	4	1	0	—		—		19	4
Rotherham United	2022–23	Championship	18	5	—		—		—		18	5
Rotherham United	2023–24	Championship	39	5	1	0	2	0	—		42	5
Rotherham United	2024–25	League One	28	1	1	0	0	0	6	4	35	5
Rotherham United	2025–26	League One	28	2	1	0	2	0	4	0	35	2
Rotherham United	Total		113	13	3	0	4	0	10	4	130	17
Hartlepool United	2026–27	National League	17	3	1	0	—		1	0	19	3
Career total (Note: Statistics for Seaham Red Star, Consett, and Marske United not recorded)			447	84	19	4	17	8	12	5	495	101

== Honours ==
Marske United

- North Riding Senior Cup runner-up: 2012–13

Port Vale

- Staffordshire Senior Cup runner-up: 2013–14

Preston North End

- Football League One play-offs: 2015

Norwich City

- EFL Championship: 2020–21

Individual

- Port Vale Young Player of the Year: 2013–14
