= 2021–22 Morecambe F.C. season =

Morecambe
2021–22 season
- Co-chairmen: Graham Howse & Rod Taylor
- Managers: Stephen Robinson (up to 22 February 2022); Derek Adams (from 24 February 2022) (Note: Barry Roche served as caretaker manager in the intervening period, taking charge of the league fixture at Rotherham United on 22 February 2022.)
- Stadium: Mazuma Stadium
- League One: 19th
- FA Cup: Third round
- EFL Cup: Second round
- EFL Trophy: Group stage (4th)
- Top goalscorer: League: Cole Stockton (23); All: Cole Stockton (26)
- Highest home attendance: 5,831 v Sunderland; 30 April 2022
- Lowest home attendance: 945 v Carlisle United; 9 November 2021
- Average home league attendance: 4,310
- Biggest win: Morecambe 3–0 Burton Albion; 2 April 2022
- Biggest defeat: Sunderland 5–0 Morecambe; 7 December 2021; Shrewsbury Town 5–0 Morecambe; 15 March 2022
Home colours	Away colours
- All statistics correct as of match played 30 April 2022.

The 2021–22 season was Morecambe's 98th season since formation, their 15th consecutive season in the Football League, and their first ever season in League One, the third tier of English football. They also competed in the FA Cup, EFL Cup and EFL Trophy.

During pre-season, Stephen Robinson was announced as the club's new manager on a three-year deal, succeeding Derek Adams who had departed to manage Bradford City.

== Pre-season friendlies ==
On 18 June 2021, Morecambe announced matches against Workington, Chorley and Blackpool.

13 July 2021 Friendly	Workington	1–5	Morecambe	Workington
19:45 BST	Allison 54' (pen.)	Report	Stockton 34'; McCalmont 43'; Trialist 59'; McDonald 60'; Obika 70'	Stadium: Borough Park; Attendance: 340; Referee: Anthony Backhouse

17 July 2021 Friendly	Chorley	1–0	Morecambe	Chorley
15:00 BST	Scarborough 81' (pen.)	Report		Stadium: Victory Park

20 July 2021 Friendly	Burnley	2–1	Morecambe	Padiham
BST	Barnes 12'; Guðmundsson 54'	Report	McPake 84'	Stadium: Barnfield Training Centre; Attendance: 0 (Behind-closed-doors)

23 July 2021 Friendly	Barnsley	0–0	Morecambe	Loughborough
14:00 BST		Report		Stadium: Loughborough University; Attendance: 0 (Behind-closed-doors)

27 July 2021 Friendly	Kendal Town	1–4	Morecambe	Kendal
19:00 BST	Trialist 83'	Report	Ayunga 13' (pen.), 38'; Phillips 31'; Mayor 62'	Stadium: Parkside Road

31 July 2021 Friendly	Morecambe	1–1	Blackpool	Morecambe
15:00 BST	McDonald 23'	Report	Hamilton 54'	Stadium: Mazuma Stadium; Referee: Andy Haines

== Competitions ==
=== EFL League One ===
==== League table ====
Pos	Team	Pld	W	D	L	GF	GA	GD	Pts	Promotion, qualification or relegation
15	Cheltenham Town	46	13	17	16	66	80	−14	56	
16	Burton Albion	46	14	11	21	51	67	−16	53	
17	Lincoln City	46	14	10	22	55	63	−8	52	
18	Shrewsbury Town	46	12	14	20	47	51	−4	50	
19	Morecambe	46	10	12	24	57	88	−31	42	
20	Fleetwood Town	46	8	16	22	62	82	−20	40	
21	Gillingham (R)	46	8	16	22	35	69	−34	40	Relegation to EFL League Two
22	Doncaster Rovers (R)	46	10	8	28	37	82	−45	38	Relegation to EFL League Two
23	AFC Wimbledon (R)	46	6	19	21	49	75	−26	37	Relegation to EFL League Two

Source: EFL Official Website
Rules for classification: 1) Points; 2) Goal difference; 3) Number of goals scored; 4) Head-to-head results; 5) Wins; 6) Away goals; 7) Penalty points based on yellow and red cards received excluding the last four games of the season (sec 9.5); 8) 12-point sending off offences; 9) If the tie affects the automatic promotion or relegation places, a play-off game or games would be held between the two tied teams
(R) Relegated

==== Results summary ====
Overall								Home						Away					
Pld	W	D	L	GF	GA	GD	Pts	W	D	L	GF	GA	GD	W	D	L	GF	GA	GD
46	10	12	24	57	88	−31	42	7	8	8	33	35	−2	3	4	16	24	53	−29

Last updated: 30 April 2022.

==== Results by matchday ====
Matchday	1	2	3	4	5	6	7	8	9	10	11	12	13	14	15	16	17	18	19	20	21	22	23	24	25	26	27	28	29	30	31	32	33	34	35	36	37	38	39	40	41	42	43	44	45	46
Ground	A	H	H	A	H	H	A	A	H	H	A	A	A	H	A	H	A	H	H	A	A	H	H	H	A	H	H	A	A	H	A	H	A	H	A	A	H	A	A	H	H	A	A	H	A	H
Result	D	W	L	L	W	L	L	W	D	W	L	L	L	D	L	L	W	D	L	L	L	D	L	W	D	L	W	D	L	D	L	D	L	D	L	D	L	L	L	W	W	L	W	D	L	L
Position	10	5	11	16	14	18	18	15	16	11	13	16	18	18	19	19	18	19	20	20	21	21	21	19	21	21	21	21	21	21	21	21	21	21	21	21	22	22	22	21	20	20	19	19	19	19

Updated to match(es) played on 30 April 2022. Source: Statto.com
A = Away; H = Home; W = Win; D = Draw; L = Loss

==== Matches ====
Morecambe's league fixtures were revealed at 09:00 BST on 24 June 2021.

7 August 2021 1	Ipswich Town	2–2	Morecambe	Ipswich
15:00 BST	Fraser 61'; Evans (yellow card) 77'; Penney (yellow card) 79'; Norwood (yellow card) 83'; Bonne 90+1'	Report	Stockton 22', 72'; O'Connor (yellow card) 49'; Gibson (yellow card) 75'	Stadium: Portman Road; Attendance: 21,037; Referee: Craig Hicks

14 August 2021 2	Morecambe	2–0	Shrewsbury Town	Morecambe
15:00 BST	Phillips 34' (pen.); Stockton 44'; McLoughlin (yellow card) 54'; Cooney (yellow card) 61'	Report	Davis (yellow card) 25'; Pierre (yellow card) 66'; Daniels (yellow card) 90+4'	Stadium: Mazuma Stadium; Attendance: 3,772; Referee: Declan Bourne

17 August 2021 3	Morecambe	0–1	Rotherham United	Morecambe
19:45 BST	Andrésson (yellow card) 22'; Cooney (yellow card) 90+4'	Report	Smith 60', (yellow card) 90+4'; Mattock (yellow card) 88'	Stadium: Mazuma Stadium; Attendance: 4,004; Referee: David Webb

21 August 2021 4	Gillingham	2–1	Morecambe	Gillingham
15:00 BST	Carayol 4'; Oliver 79' (pen.), (yellow card) 90+1'	Report	Stockton 25'; Cooney (yellow card) 46'; Lavelle (yellow card) 51'	Stadium: Priestfield Stadium; Attendance: 3,789; Referee: Tom Nield

28 August 2021 5	Morecambe	1–0	Sheffield Wednesday	Morecambe
15:00 BST	McLoughlin (yellow card) 12'; Cooney (yellow card) 34'; Adeniran 63' (o.g.)	Report	Byers (yellow card) 5'	Stadium: Mazuma Stadium; Attendance: 5,481; Referee: Anthony Backhouse

11 September 2021 6	Morecambe	3–4	AFC Wimbledon	Morecambe
15:00 BST	Stockton 49', 65'; McLoughlin 54'; Leigh (yellow card) 73'; Delaney (yellow card) 89'	Report	Hartigan 5'; Mebude (yellow card) 25'; Lawrence (yellow card) 35'; Chislett 61', (yellow card) 67'; Nightingale 72'; Assal 90+4', (yellow card) 90+5'	Stadium: Mazuma Stadium; Attendance: 3,173; Referee: Seb Stockbridge

18 September 2021 7	Doncaster Rovers	1–0	Morecambe	Doncaster
15:00 BST	Rowe 81'	Report		Stadium: Keepmoat Stadium; Referee: Will Finnie

21 September 2021 8	Crewe Alexandra	1–3	Morecambe	Crewe
19:45 BST	Mandron 49'	Report	Phillips 8'; Gnahoua 28', 85'; Cooney (yellow card) 40'; McLoughlin (yellow card) 79'; Stockton (yellow card) 80'	Stadium: Mornflake Stadium; Referee: Paul Howard

25 September 2021 9	Morecambe	3–3	Accrington Stanley	Morecambe
15:00 BST	Stockton 15', 81'; Gibson (yellow card) 19'; Phillips 27'; McLoughlin (red card) 38'	Report	Bishop 19' (pen.), 68'; Butcher 21'; Hamilton (yellow card) 39'	Stadium: Mazuma Stadium; Attendance: 4,142; Referee: Marc Edwards

28 September 2021 10	Morecambe	2–0	Lincoln City	Morecambe
19:45 BST	Stockton 53'; McLaughlin (yellow card) 55'; Wootton 79'	Report		Stadium: Mazuma Stadium; Attendance: 3,466; Referee: Ben Toner

2 October 2021 11	Wycombe Wanderers	4–3	Morecambe	High Wycombe
15:00 BST	Horgan 50'; Vokes 53'; Tafazolli 73'; Thompson 90+2'	Report	McCalmont 4'; Phillips 26'; Ayunga 80'	Stadium: Adams Park; Attendance: 4,161; Referee: Tom Reeves

15 October 2021 12	Burton Albion	3–2	Morecambe	Burton upon Trent
19:45 BST	O'Connor 6', 49'; Shaughnessy 14'; Hamer (yellow card) 34'; Chapman (yellow card) 57'; Mancienne (yellow card) 78'; Oshilaja (yellow card) 78'	Report	Gibson 3', (yellow card) 90'; Stockton 90+4'	Stadium: Pirelli Stadium; Attendance: 2,477; Referee: Martin Coy

19 October 2021 13	Cheltenham Town	3–1	Morecambe	Cheltenham
19:45 GMT	Sercombe 26'; Joseph 65', 68'	Report	Phillips 38'; O'Connor (yellow card) 52'; Gnahoua (yellow card) 74'	Stadium: Jonny-Rocks Stadium; Attendance: 2,909; Referee: Ben Speedie

23 October 2021 14	Morecambe	1–1	Plymouth Argyle	Morecambe
15:00 BST	Ayunga 6'; Jones (yellow card) 65'	Report	Mayor 12'; Houghton (yellow card) 79'; Galloway (yellow card) 84'	Stadium: Mazuma Stadium; Attendance: 4,272; Referee: Marc Edwards

30 October 2021 15	Oxford United	3–1	Morecambe	Littlemore
15:00 BST	Seddon 29'; Henry (penalty missed) 52'; Sykes 73'; Taylor 87'	Report	Andrésson (yellow card) 51'; Stockton 64'	Stadium: The Kassam Stadium; Attendance: 8,766; Referee: Lee Swabey

2 November 2021 16	Morecambe	0–2	Cambridge United	Morecambe
19:45 GMT	McDonald (yellow card) 19'; Stockton (yellow card) 45+1'; Ayunga (yellow card) 54'; Price (yellow card) 64'	Report	Worman 28'; Lankester (yellow card) 29'; Ironside 72' (pen.); Smith (yellow card) 78'	Stadium: Mazuma Stadium; Attendance: 3,414; Referee: Bobby Madley

20 November 2021 17	Fleetwood Town	1–2	Morecambe	Fleetwood
15:00 GMT	Johnson 82'; Pilkington (yellow card) 90+5' (yellow-red card) 90+6'	Report	Jones 11'; McLoughlin (yellow card) 43'; Stockton 90+4', (yellow card) 90+5'	Stadium: Highbury Stadium; Attendance: 3,545; Referee: Darren Drysdale

23 November 2021 18	Morecambe	2–2	Charlton Athletic	Morecambe
19:45 GMT	Stockton 29' (pen.); Ayunga (yellow card) 60'; O'Connor 72'; Leigh (yellow card) 90+1'	Report	Jaiyesimi 2'; Washington 27'; Gunter (yellow card) 28'; Dobson (yellow card) 69'	Stadium: Mazuma Stadium; Attendance: 4,009; Referee: Andy Haines

27 November 2021 19	Morecambe	0–4	Milton Keynes Dons	Morecambe
15:00 GMT	McLoughlin (yellow card) 32'	Report	Eisa 23'; O'Hora (yellow card) 34'; O'Riley 40', 82'; Darling 64'	Stadium: Mazuma Stadium; Attendance: 3,700; Referee: Rebecca Welch

7 December 2021 20	Sunderland	5–0	Morecambe	Sunderland
19:45 GMT	Stewart 13'; Broadhead 17', 68'; Pritchard 56'; Dajaku 87'	Report	Ayunga (yellow card) 71'	Stadium: Stadium of Light; Attendance: 26,516; Referee: Ollie Yates

11 December 2021 21	Portsmouth	2–0	Morecambe	Milton
15:00 GMT	Harness 11'; Hackett-Fairchild (yellow card) 60'; Ogilvie 77'	Report	Gibson (yellow card) 38'; McLaughlin (yellow card) 85'; Delaney (yellow card) 90+5'	Stadium: Fratton Park; Attendance: 15,001; Referee: Charles Breakspear

18 December 2021 22	Morecambe	0–0	Fleetwood Town	Morecambe
15:00 GMT	McLoughlin (yellow card) 83'	Report	Matete (yellow card) 79'	Stadium: Mazuma Stadium; Attendance: 4,018; Referee: Christopher Pollard

29 December 2021 23	Morecambe	1–2	Crewe Alexandra	Morecambe
19:45 GMT	Leigh 36'	Report	Adebisi (yellow card) 42'; Porter 52'; Murphy 58' (yellow card) 59'	Stadium: Mazuma Stadium; Attendance: 3,831; Referee: Seb Stockbridge

2 January 2022 24	Morecambe	4–3	Doncaster Rovers	Morecambe
15:00 GMT	Stockton 52', 74'; Obika 83'; Diagouraga 85'; Ayunga (yellow card) 86'	Report	Barlow 7'; Gardner 26'; Olowu 29', (yellow card) 84'; Hiwula (yellow card) 64'	Stadium: Mazuma Stadium; Attendance: 4,001; Referee: James Bell

15 January 2022 25	AFC Wimbledon	0–0	Morecambe	Wimbledon
15:00 GMT	Marsh (yellow card) 83'; Ablade (yellow card) 90+1'	Report	Wildig (yellow card) 58'; Leigh (yellow card) 65'	Stadium: Plough Lane; Attendance: 7,128; Referee: Ben Speedie

18 January 2022 26	Morecambe	1–2	Wigan Athletic	Morecambe
19:45 GMT	Stockton 7'; McLaughlin (yellow card) 90'	Report	Keane 45+1'; Watts (yellow card) 70'; Humphrys 73'	Stadium: Mazuma Stadium; Attendance: 5,359; Referee: Sam Barrott

22 January 2022 27	Morecambe	3–2	Wycombe Wanderers	Morecambe
15:00 GMT	O'Connor 39'; Leigh (yellow card) 53'; Ayunga 60', (yellow card) 86'; Stockton 67'	Report	Akinfenwa 2'; Grimmer 54'; Tafazolli (yellow card) 58'; Jacobson (yellow card) 84'	Stadium: Mazuma Stadium; Attendance: 3,865; Referee: Ben Toner

29 January 2022 28	Accrington Stanley	2–2	Morecambe	Accrington
15:00 GMT	Bishop 35'; Nottingham 45+4'; Rich-Baghuelou (yellow card) 85'; Butcher (yellow card) 88'	Report	Ayunga 14', 26'; Diagouraga (yellow card) 38'; Carson (yellow card) 74'	Stadium: Wham Stadium; Attendance: 3,527; Referee: Sam Purkiss

1 February 2022 29	Sheffield Wednesday	2–0	Morecambe	Owlerton
19:45 GMT	Byers 55'; Hutchinson (yellow card) 83'; Mendez-Laing 90+1'	Report	McLaughlin (yellow card) 50'	Stadium: Hillsborough; Attendance: 19,261; Referee: Ollie Yates

5 February 2022 30	Morecambe	1–1	Bolton Wanderers	Morecambe
15:00 GMT	Stockton 73'; Smith (yellow card) 86'	Report	Johnston (yellow card) 45'; Santos (red card) 69'; Bakayoko 90+5'	Stadium: Mazuma Stadium; Attendance: 5,617; Referee: Ross Joyce

8 February 2022 31	Lincoln City	2–1	Morecambe	Lincoln
19:45 GMT	Whittaker 10'; Bramall 19'; Walsh (yellow card) 42'; Maguire (yellow card) 90+2'	Report	Diagouraga 56'; Bedeau (yellow card) 90+2'	Stadium: LNER Stadium; Attendance: 7,571; Referee: Anthony Backhouse

12 February 2022 32	Morecambe	1–1	Gillingham	Morecambe
15:00 GMT	Obika 84'	Report	Tutonda (yellow card) 45+1'; Jackson 72'; Kelman (yellow card) 90+4'	Stadium: Mazuma Stadium; Attendance: 4,499; Referee: Peter Wright

22 February 2022 33	Rotherham United	2–0	Morecambe	Rotherham
19:45 GMT	Ladapo 4', 30'; Wiles (yellow card) 45+3'	Report	Bedeau (yellow card) 73'	Stadium: AESSEAL New York Stadium; Attendance: 8,376; Referee: Simon Mather

26 February 2022 34	Morecambe	1–1	Ipswich Town	Morecambe
15:00 GMT	Wildig 59'	Report	Bonne (yellow card) 62'; Burns 86'; Bakinson (yellow card) 88'	Stadium: The Mazuma Stadium; Attendance: 4,928; Referee: Matt Donohue

5 March 2022 35	Plymouth Argyle	2–0	Morecambe	Plymouth
15:00 GMT	Grant 14'; Hardie 43'	Report	Connolly (yellow card) 34'; O'Connor (yellow card) 59'	Stadium: Home Park; Attendance: 12,228; Referee: Alan Young

8 March 2022 36	Bolton Wanderers	1–1	Morecambe	Horwich
20:00 GMT	Böðvarsson 90+4'	Report	Gibson (yellow card) 35'; Stockton 41', (yellow card) 90+6'; Connolly (yellow card) 73'; Bedeau (yellow card) 90+6'	Stadium: University of Bolton Stadium; Attendance: 14,559; Referee: Chris Sarginson

12 March 2022 37	Morecambe	1–3	Cheltenham Town	Morecambe
15:00 GMT	Leigh 52'	Report	Bonds (yellow card) 9'; Sercombe 44'; Wright 46'; May 80'	Stadium: The Mazuma Stadium; Attendance: 3,733; Referee: Andrew Kitchen

15 March 2022 38	Shrewsbury Town	5–0	Morecambe	Shrewsbury
19:45 GMT	Udoh 44', 65'; Leahy 47' (pen.), 51'; Bowman 70'	Report	Wildig (yellow card) 50'; McLoughlin (yellow card) 89'	Stadium: Montgomery Waters Meadow; Attendance: 5,804; Referee: Darren Drysdale

19 March 2022 39	Wigan Athletic	4–1	Morecambe	Wigan
15:00 GMT	Magennis 19'; Kerr 44'; Keane 67'; Humphrys 68'	Report	Connolly 49' (pen.); Stockton (yellow card) 75'	Stadium: DW Stadium; Attendance: 10,072; Referee: James Oldham

2 April 2022 40	Morecambe	3–0	Burton Albion	Morecambe
15:00 BST	Connolly (yellow card) 28'; Gnahoua 41'; Phillips 45+5'; Stockton 46'	Report	Shaughnessy (red card) 43'; Oshilaja (yellow card) 71'	Stadium: The Mazuma Stadium; Attendance: 5,238; Referee: Ross Joyce

5 April 2022 41	Morecambe	2–1	Oxford United	Morecambe
19:45 BST	Wildig 14'; Stockton 25'; McLaughlin (yellow card) 42'; Fané (yellow card) 47'	Report	Taylor 3'; Williams (yellow card) 44'	Stadium: The Mazuma Stadium; Attendance: 3,882; Referee: Robert Lewis

9 April 2022 42	Cambridge United	2–1	Morecambe	Cambridge
15:00 BST	Smith 42'; Ironside 71' (pen.)	Report	Fané (yellow card) 51'; Stockton 68'	Stadium: Abbey Stadium; Attendance: 5,813; Referee: Carl Boyeson

15 April 2022 43	Charlton Athletic	2–3	Morecambe	Charlton
15:00 BST	Stockley 53'; Pearce (yellow card) 75'; Aneke 81'	Report	Stockton 26'; Gnahoua 43', 59'	Stadium: The Valley; Attendance: 10,700; Referee: Marc Edwards

18 April 2022 44	Morecambe	1–1	Portsmouth	Morecambe
15:00 BST	Ayunga 90+3'; Leigh (yellow card) 90+5'	Report	Raggett 41'	Stadium: The Mazuma Stadium; Attendance: 4,893; Referee: Bobby Madley

23 April 2022 45	Milton Keynes Dons	2–0	Morecambe	Denbigh
15:00 BST	Darling 20'; Kasumu (yellow card) 32'; Lewington (yellow card) 56'; Harvie 79'	Report	Gibson (yellow card) 7'; Connolly (yellow card) 67'; Phillips (yellow card) 86'; Ayunga (yellow card) 89'	Stadium: Stadium MK; Attendance: 10,101; Referee: Lee Swabey

30 April 2022 46	Morecambe	0–1	Sunderland	Morecambe
12:30 BST	Phillips (yellow card) 11'; Wildig (yellow card) 68'; Stockton (yellow card) 77'; Cooney (yellow card) 90+1'	Report	Broadhead 10'; Matete (yellow card) 90+2'	Stadium: The Mazuma Stadium; Attendance: 5,831; Referee: Gavin Ward

=== FA Cup ===
Morecambe were drawn at home to Newport County in the first round, away to Buxton in the second round and to Tottenham Hotspur in the third round.

6 November 2021 First round	Morecambe	1–0	Newport County	Morecambe
15:00 GMT	Wootton (yellow card) 12'; Wildig 68'	Report		Stadium: Mazuma Stadium; Attendance: 1,879; Referee: Tom Nield

4 December 2021 Second round	Buxton	0–1	Morecambe	Buxton
12:45 GMT	Elliott (yellow card) 45+1'; Meikle (yellow card) 50'	Report	Stockton 29'	Stadium: Silverlands; Attendance: 3,642; Referee: Lee Swabey

9 January 2022 Third round	Tottenham Hotspur	3–1	Morecambe	Tottenham
14:00 GMT	Winks 74'; Lucas Moura 85'; Kane 88'	Report	O'Connor 33'; Diagouraga (yellow card) 44'; Cooney (yellow card) 74'	Stadium: Tottenham Hotspur Stadium; Attendance: 40,310; Referee: John Brooks

=== EFL Cup ===
Morecambe were drawn away to Blackburn Rovers in the first round and at home to Preston North End in the second round.

10 August 2021 First round	Blackburn Rovers	1–2	Morecambe	Blackburn
19:45 BST	Buckley (yellow card) 6'; Dolan 22'; Davenport (yellow card) 81'	Report	Stockton 52'; O'Connor (yellow card) 75'; Phillips 84' (pen.), (yellow card) 90+1'	Stadium: Ewood Park; Attendance: 5,283; Referee: Steve Martin

24 August 2021 Second round	Morecambe	2–4	Preston North End	Morecambe
19:45 BST	Duffus (yellow card) 39'; O'Connor 45+4'; Stockton 61'	Report	Riis Jakobsen 7', 33'; Hughes (yellow card) 45+3'; Ledson (yellow card) 54', (goal) 64' van den Berg 79', (yellow card) 90'	Stadium: Mazuma Stadium; Attendance: 4,334; Referee: James Oldham

=== EFL Trophy ===
Morecambe were placed into pre-determined (to minimise travel) Northern Group A with League Two sides Carlisle United and Hartlepool United at 15:00 BST on 23 June 2021. At 16:30 the following day, live on Sky Sports, they were joined by Everton U23, Anton Ferdinand making the draw. Group stage matches were revealed on July 6.

Pos	Div	Team	Pld	W	PW	PL	L	GF	GA	GD	Pts	Qualification
1	L2	Carlisle United	3	2	1	0	0	7	3	+4	8	Advance to Round 2
2	L2	Hartlepool United	3	1	1	1	0	6	5	+1	6	Advance to Round 2
3	ACA	Everton U21	3	1	0	0	2	1	3	−2	3	
4	L1	Morecambe	3	0	0	1	2	2	5	−3	1	

Source: EFL.com

14 September 2021 Group game 1	Morecambe	0–1	Everton U21	Morecambe
19:00 BST	McCalmont (yellow card) 81'	Report	Welch (yellow card) 30'; McAllister 64'	Stadium: Mazuma Stadium; Attendance: 1,004; Referee: Andy Haines

5 October 2021 Group stage	Hartlepool United	2–2 (4–2 p)	Morecambe	Hartlepool
19:00 BST	Smith (yellow card) 2'; Daly 8', 83'; Ogle (yellow card) 39'; Odusina (yellow card) 50'; Fondop (yellow card) 79'	Report	McLoughlin 33'; Jones 40' (pen.); Price (yellow card) 63'	Stadium: Victoria Park; Attendance: 1,572; Referee: Simon Mather
	Penalties
	Daly (penalty scored); Molyneux (penalty scored); Ferguson (penalty scored); Crawford (penalty scored)		Cooney (penalty scored); McLoughlin (penalty missed); Gnahoua (penalty missed); Jones (penalty scored)

9 November 2021 Group game 3	Morecambe	0–2	Carlisle United	Morecambe
19:00 GMT	Gibson (yellow card) 34'	Report	Gibson 49'; Mellor 54'	Stadium: Mazuma Stadium; Attendance: 945; Referee: Ross Joyce

== Transfers ==
=== Transfers in ===
Date	Position	Nationality	Name	From	Fee	Ref.
1 July 2021	RB	ENG	Ryan Cooney	(England) Burnley	Free transfer	
1 July 2021	CB	IRL	Ryan Delaney	(England) Bolton Wanderers	Free transfer	
1 July 2021	LW	FRA	Arthur Gnahoua	(England) Bolton Wanderers	Free transfer	
1 July 2021	RW	ENG	Wes McDonald	(England) Walsall	Free transfer	
1 July 2021	CF	ENG	Jonathan Obika	(Scotland) St Mirren	Free transfer	
1 July 2021	CB	IRL	Anthony O'Connor	(England) Bradford City	Free transfer	
8 July 2021	LB	JAM	Greg Leigh	(Scotland) Aberdeen	Free transfer	
13 July 2021	AM	IRL	Shane McLoughlin	(England) AFC Wimbledon	Free transfer	
13 July 2021	CB	GHA	Jacob Mensah	(England) Weymouth	Free transfer	
26 July 2021	CF	KEN	Jonah Ayunga	(England) Bristol Rovers	Undisclosed	
10 August 2021	CB	ENG	Scott Wootton	(England) Plymouth Argyle	Free transfer	
11 August 2021	CF	ENG	Shayon Harrison	(England) AFC Wimbledon	Free transfer	
19 August 2021	CF	ENG	Courtney Duffus	(England) Bromley	Undisclosed	
10 September 2021	RB	NIR	Ryan McLaughlin	(England) Rochdale	Free transfer	
18 January 2022	DM	FRA	Ousmane Fané	(Malaysia) UiTM	Free transfer	
28 January 2022	CB	ENG	Rhys Bennett	(England) Gillingham	Free transfer	
31 January 2022	AM	IRL	Dylan Connolly	(England) Northampton Town	Undisclosed	
4 February 2022	GK	ENG	Adam Smith	(England) Stevenage	Free transfer	

=== Loans in ===
Date from	Position	Nationality	Name	From	Date until	Ref.
1 July 2021	CM	WAL	Callum Jones	(England) Hull City	January 2022	
1 July 2021	LW	SCO	Josh McPake	(Scotland) Rangers	January 2022 (Note: On 4 January 2022, McPake was recalled by parent club Rangers.)	
2 July 2021	CM	NIR	Alfie McCalmont	(England) Leeds United	End of season	
23 July 2021	GK	ISL	Jökull Andrésson	(England) Reading	January 2022 (Note: On 10 January 2022, Andrésson was recalled by parent club Reading.)	
27 July 2021	CM	ENG	Adam Phillips	(England) Burnley	End of season	
4 January 2022	CB	ENG	Jacob Bedeau	(England) Burnley	End of season	
5 January 2022	GK	NIR	Trevor Carson	(Scotland) Dundee United	End of season	

=== Loans out ===
Date from	Position	Nationality	Name	To	Date until	Ref.
31 January 2022	CB	IRL	Ryan Delaney	(England) Scunthorpe United	End of season	
24 March 2022	CF	IRL	Courtney Duffus	(England) Stockport County	End of season	

=== Transfers out ===
Date	Position	Nationality	Name	To	Fee	Ref.
26 June 2021	RW	ESP	Carlos Mendes Gomes	(England) Luton Town	Undisclosed	
30 June 2021	CB	ENG	Harry Davis	(England) Scunthorpe United	Released	
30 June 2021	GK	ENG	Mark Halstead	(England) Torquay United	Released	
30 June 2021	LB	SCO	Stephen Hendrie	(Scotland) Partick Thistle	Released	
30 June 2021	DM	ENG	Alex Kenyon	(England) Scunthorpe United	Released	
30 June 2021	CB	ENG	Nathaniel Knight-Percival	(England) Tranmere Rovers	Free transfer	
30 June 2021	CF	ENG	A-Jay Leitch-Smith	(England) Altrincham	Released	
30 June 2021	CF	IRL	Liam McAlinden	(Wales) Wrexham	Released	
30 June 2021	RW	IRL	John O'Sullivan	(England) Accrington Stanley	Released	
30 June 2021	LM	ENG	Ben Pringle	(England) Altrincham	Released	
30 June 2021	CF	ENG	Jordan Slew	(England) FC Halifax Town	Released	
30 June 2021	DM	CMR	Yann Songo'o	(England) Bradford City	Released	
31 August 2021	CB	SCO	Samuel Lavelle	(England) Charlton Athletic	Undisclosed	
31 August 2021	RB	ENG	Kelvin Mellor	(England) Carlisle United	Free transfer	
7 January 2022	CB	ENG	Scott Wootton	(Australia) Wellington Phoenix	Mutual consent	
11 January 2022	CF	ENG	Shayon Harrison	Hayes & Yeading United F.C.	Contract expiry	
8 February 2022	GK	WAL	Kyle Letheren	Free agent	Mutual consent	
