= Jack Nolan (English footballer) =

English footballer (born 2001)

Personal information
- Full name: Jack Daniel Nolan
- Date of birth: 25 May 2001 (age 25)
- Place of birth: Portsmouth, England
- Height: 1.80 m (5 ft 11 in)
- Position: Winger

Team information
- Current team: Hartlepool United
- Number: 17

Youth career
- –2020: Reading

Senior career*
Years	Team	Apps	(Gls)
2020–2021	Walsall	13	(0)
2021–2024	Accrington Stanley	63	(17)
2024–2025	Gillingham	31	(1)
2025–2026	Morecambe	39	(18)
2026–	Hartlepool United	17	(1)

International career
2017–2018	England U17	4	(1)
- * Club domestic league appearances and goals as of 23:17, 21 November 2026 (UTC)

Jack Daniel Nolan (born 25 May 2001) is an English professional footballer who plays as a winger for National League club Hartlepool United. He started his career with the youth team of Reading before making his senior debut with Walsall. He has represented England at under-17 level.

== Club career ==
Nolan was a regular feature in Reading's under-18 side from the age of 15 and, turning professional on his 17th birthday.

On 16 January 2020, Nolan signed for League Two side Walsall for an undisclosed fee. Nolan made his senior professional debut in Walsall's 2–1 defeat at home to Crewe Alexandra on 1 February 2020.

On 5 August 2021, Nolan signed for League One side Accrington Stanley. He was offered a new contract at the end of the 2023–24 season.

Nolan signed for Gillingham in June 2024 for an undisclosed transfer fee. Nolan scored on his debut for the club, scoring the third in a 4–1 home win over Carlisle United on the opening day of the season. On 1 September 2025, he departed the club by mutual consent.

On 9 September 2025, Nolan joined National League club Morecambe. Nolan finished the 2025–26 season as the club's top goalscorer with 18 goals and was named as the club's Player of the Season. He left the club at the end of the season following their relegation to the National League North.

On 9 June 2026, Nolan returned to the National League, agreeing to join Hartlepool United on a two-year deal. He scored for Hartlepool on the opening day of the 2026–27 season in a 2–0 home win against Barrow.

== International career ==
Nolan made his debut for England under-17s against Turkey on 18 August 2017 at St George's Park in the lead up to the 2017 U-17 World Cup. In November 2017, he returned to the team and scored the winning goal for the under-17s in a 2–1 victory against Germany.

== Career statistics ==
As of match played 21 November 2026

Appearances and goals by club, season and competition
Club	Season	League			FA Cup		EFL Cup		Other		Total	
Club	Season	Division	Apps	Goals	Apps	Goals	Apps	Goals	Apps	Goals	Apps	Goals
Walsall	2019–20	League Two	4	0	0	0	0	0	0	0	4	0
Walsall	2020–21	League Two	9	0	0	0	0	0	3 (Note: Appearance(s) in the EFL Trophy.)	0	12	0
Walsall	Total		13	0	0	0	0	0	3	0	16	0
Accrington Stanley	2021–22	League One	5	0	1	0	1	0	3	1	10	1
Accrington Stanley	2022–23	League One	13	0	3	0	0	0	1	0	17	0
Accrington Stanley	2023–24	League Two	45	17	2	0	1	0	5	0	53	17
Accrington Stanley	Total		63	17	6	0	2	0	9	1	80	18
Gillingham	2024–25	League Two	31	1	1	0	1	0	3	0	36	1
Morecambe	2025–26	National League	39	18	2	0	—		2 (Note: Appearance in the FA Trophy)	1	43	19
Hartlepool United	2026–27	National League	17	1	1	0	–		2	1	20	2
Career total			163	37	10	0	3	0	19	3	195	40

== Honours ==
Individual

- Morecambe Player of the Year: 2025–26
