= Will Harris (footballer) =

English footballer (born 2000)

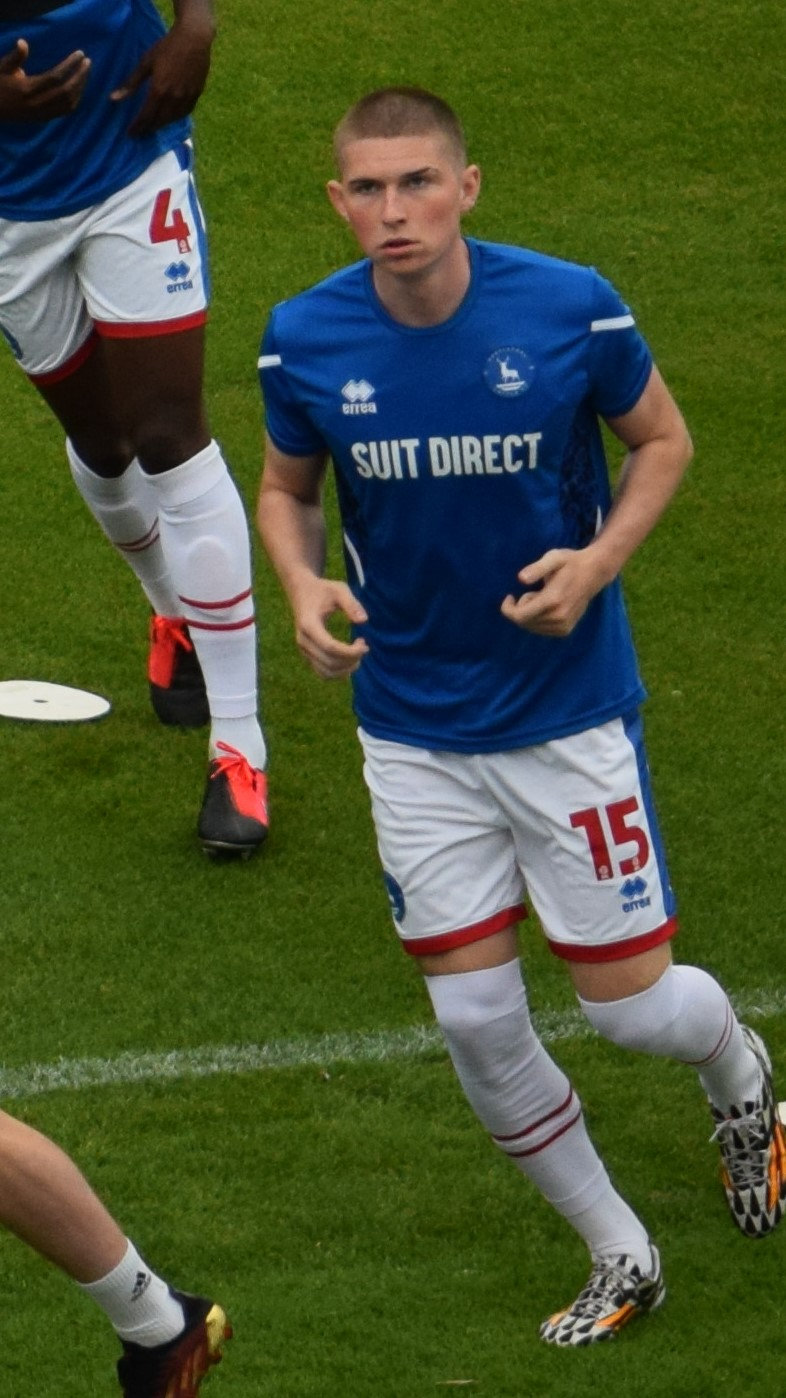
- Harris warming up for Hartlepool United, while on trial with the club, in 2022

Personal information
- Full name: William Harris
- Date of birth: 1 October 2000 (age 26)
- Place of birth: South Shields, England
- Height: 6 ft 2 in (1.88 m)
- Position: Striker

Team information
- Current team: Hartlepool United
- Number: 10

Youth career
- 2009–2016: Hebburn Town
- 2017–2019: Burnley

Senior career*
Years	Team	Apps	(Gls)
2018–2020	Burnley	0	(0)
2018	→ Nelson (loan)	11	(2)
2019–2020	→ Colne (loan)	12	(9)
2020	→ Warrington Town (loan)	9	(4)
2020–2022	Sunderland	3	(0)
2022	→ Barrow (loan)	9	(0)
2022–2023	Gateshead	27	(2)
2023–2025	Spennymoor Town	68	(17)
2024	→ Scunthorpe United (loan)	3	(0)
2025–2026	FC Halifax Town	43	(22)
2026–	Hartlepool United	18	(6)
- * Club domestic league appearances and goals as of 23:14, 21 November 2026 (UTC)

William Harris (born 1 October 2000) is an English professional footballer who plays as a striker for National League club Hartlepool United.

== Career ==
A youth product of Hebburn Town and Burnley, Harris began his career with consecutive loans to Nelson, Colne and Warrington Town. He moved to EFL League One club Sunderland on 1 September 2020, making his professional debut in a 2–1 EFL Trophy win over Lincoln City on 5 October 2021. He made his senior professional league debut on 16 October 2021, coming on as a 90th minute substitute in a 2–1 win over Gillingham.

On 6 January 2022, Harris joined EFL League Two club Barrow on loan for the remainder of the 2021–22 season, featuring nine times for The Bluebirds. He was released by Sunderland at the end of his contract.

Following a pre-season trial with Hartlepool United, manager Paul Hartley stated that the club had planned to take "another look" at Harris before he subsequently accepted an opportunity elsewhere.

In July 2022, Harris signed for newly-promoted National League club Gateshead on a one-year deal. He made an appearance in the 2023 FA Trophy final for Gateshead as an 83rd minute substitute as they lost 1–0 to FC Halifax Town.

On 17 June 2023, Harris signed for National League North club Spennymoor Town. In November 2024, he joined Scunthorpe United in a loan swap deal. He played for Spennymoor in the 2025 FA Trophy final, coming on as a 74th minute substitute in a 3–0 defeat to Aldershot Town.

On 8 July 2025, Harris joined National League side FC Halifax Town. In the 2025–26 season, Harris scored 22 times in 43 appearances.

=== Hartlepool United ===
On 27 June 2026, Harris signed for National League club Hartlepool United on a deal until June 2028 with the club having the option to extend the agreement a further year. Later that day, FC Halifax released a statement which said that they held the player registration for Harris: "A one year option was exercised for an additional contract year, for which the player has been informed within the normal administrative process of the FA and importantly within the FA timescale for 2026". He scored for Hartlepool on the opening day of the 2026–27 season in a 2–0 home win against Barrow.

== Career statistics ==
As of match played 21 November 2026

Appearances and goals by club, season and competition
Club	Season	League			FA Cup		EFL Cup		Other		Total	
Club	Season	Division	Apps	Goals	Apps	Goals	Apps	Goals	Apps	Goals	Apps	Goals
Sunderland	2021–22	League One	3	0	0	0	0	0	4 (Note: Appearance(s) in EFL Trophy)	0	7	0
Barrow (loan)	2021–22	League Two	9	0	0	0	0	0	0	0	9	0
Gateshead	2022–23	National League	27	2	1	1	—		2 (Note: Appearance(s) in FA Trophy)	1	30	4
Spennymoor Town	2023–24	National League North	45	16	2	0	—		1	0	48	16
Spennymoor Town	2024–25	National League North	23	1	2	0	—		4	0	29	1
Spennymoor Town	Total		68	17	4	0	0	0	5	0	77	17
Scunthorpe United (loan)	2024–25	National League North	3	0	0	0	—		0	0	3	0
FC Halifax Town	2025–26	National League	43	22	2	2	—		3	3	48	27
Hartlepool United	2026–27	National League	18	6	1	0	–		2	0	21	6
Career total			171	47	8	3	0	0	16	4	195	54

== Honours ==
Gateshead

- FA Trophy runner-up: 2022–23

Spennymoor Town

- FA Trophy runner-up: 2024–25
