= Jamie Miley =

English footballer (born 2004)

Personal information
- Full name: Jamie Miley
- Date of birth: 14 January 2004 (age 22)
- Place of birth: Gateshead, England
- Height: 1.75 m (5 ft 9 in)
- Position: Midfielder

Team information
- Current team: Hartlepool United
- Number: 8

Youth career
- 2009–2015: Beamish Boys Club
- 2015–2022: Newcastle United

Senior career*
Years	Team	Apps	(Gls)
2024–2025	Newcastle United	0	(0)
2024–2025	→ Newport County (loan)	6	(0)
2025–	Hartlepool United	79	(7)
- * Club domestic league appearances and goals as of 23:13, 21 November 2026 (UTC)

Jamie Miley (born 14 January 2004) is an English footballer who plays as a central midfielder for National League club Hartlepool United.

== Career ==
=== Newcastle United ===
Miley joined Newcastle United's Academy at the age of 11.

He made his debut for Newcastle's Under-21 side at the age of 17 against Sheffield Wednesday in the 2021–22 EFL Trophy. Miley played for the first-team for the first time during their pre-season friendly win against Gateshead in July 2023 and again in friendly wins over Hull City in July 2024 and La Liga team Girona in August 2024.

==== Newport County (loan) ====
On 29 August 2024, Miley joined League Two club Newport County on loan for the remainder of the 2024–25 season. He made his debut for Newport on 3 September 2024 in the 2–1 EFL Trophy defeat to Cheltenham Town. Miley made his Football League debut on 22 October 2024 in the 2–0 League Two win against Gillingham. He was recalled by Newcastle from his loan to Newport on 13 January 2025. Miley made eight appearances for the club, three of those starts, during an injury-hit spell at Newport.

=== Hartlepool United ===
On 30 January 2025, Miley signed for National League side Hartlepool United. On 1 February 2025 he scored on his debut, a stoppage time equaliser in a 1–1 draw at Braintree Town. On 11 October 2025, he signed a contract extension at Hartlepool to keep him with the club until 2027 with the option of another year. Miley played in all 46 league games for Pools in the 2025–26 season, scoring three times.

== Personal life ==
His younger brother, Lewis, plays for Newcastle United as midfielder.

== Career statistics ==
As of match played 21 November 2026

Appearances and goals by club, season and competition
Club	Season	League			FA Cup		EFL Cup		Other		Total	
Club	Season	Division	Apps	Goals	Apps	Goals	Apps	Goals	Apps	Goals	Apps	Goals
Newcastle United U21s	2021–22	—			—		—		1 (Note: Appearance(s) in EFL Trophy)	0	1	0
Newcastle United U21s	2022–23	—			—		—		1	0	1	0
Newcastle United U21s	2023–24	—			—		—		2	0	2	0
Newcastle United U21s	Total		0	0	0	0	0	0	4	0	4	0
Newport County (loan)	2024–25	League Two	6	0	0	0	1	0	1	0	8	0
Hartlepool United	2024–25	National League	16	2	0	0	0	0	0	0	16	2
Hartlepool United	2025–26	National League	46	3	2	0	0	0	1	0	49	3
Hartlepool United	2026–27	National League	17	2	1	0	0	0	0	0	18	2
Hartlepool United	Total		79	7	3	0	0	0	1	0	83	7
Career total			84	7	3	0	1	0	6	0	94	7
