= Luke Charman =

English footballer (born 1997)

Personal information
- Full name: Luke Bowler Charman
- Date of birth: 9 December 1997 (age 28)
- Place of birth: Durham, England
- Height: 6 ft 1 in (1.85 m)
- Position: Striker

Team information
- Current team: Hartlepool United
- Number: 11

Youth career
- –2017: Newcastle United

Senior career*
Years	Team	Apps	(Gls)
2017–2020	Newcastle United	0	(0)
2018–2019	→ Accrington Stanley (loan)	0	(0)
2020–2022	Darlington	22	(12)
2022	Rochdale	20	(2)
2022–2024	AFC Fylde	55	(7)
2024–	Hartlepool United	75	(8)
- * Club domestic league appearances and goals as of 23:15, 21 November 2026 (UTC)

Luke Bowler Charman (born 9 December 1997) is an English professional footballer who plays as a striker for National League club Hartlepool United.

He began his career with Newcastle United, but never played for their first team, and made his professional debut in the EFL Trophy while on loan at Accrington Stanley. Released by Newcastle in 2020, he joined National League North club Darlington, for whom 19 goals from 33 appearances earned him a move to the Football League with Rochdale. He signed a two-year contract with AFC Fylde in 2022, before joining Hartlepool United in 2024.

== Life and career ==
=== Newcastle United ===
Charman was born in 1997 in Durham. He lived in nearby Sherburn Village and attended Belmont Community School. He joined Newcastle United's Academy at 15, made his debut for their under-18s in a 1–0 loss away to Arsenal U18 in April 2014, and took up a two-year scholarship in July after he left school. He was told in February 2016 that he would not be kept on at the end of the season, but the club had a change of heart and offered several scholars an extra year; coach Dave Watson picked him out as the player who had shown most improvement over the past year.

He continued to progress, and signed his first professional contract in 2017. During the 2017–18 season, he played twice for Newcastle U21 in the EFL Trophy, top scored for their under-23 team, and at the end of a season when 18 reserve players were released in a "major shake-up" when "all those who United do not consider to have a future at the club have been allowed to go", his contract was extended.

In August 2018, Charman joined League One club Accrington Stanley on loan for the season. Partly through injury, and partly because the rules limited the number of loanees in a matchday squad to five – Stanley had seven players on loan – he did not make his senior debut until 6 November, in the EFL Trophy in a 2–1 win against West Bromwich Albion U21s. Four days later, he started against Colchester United in the first round of the FA Cup, in which fellow Newcastle loanee Dan Barlaser scored the only goal. Shortly after coming on for his first league appearance, as a second-half substitute on 8 December at home to Sunderland in atrocious weather conditions, Charman was involved in the equaliser, which was Connor Hall's first league goal. Five minutes later, the referee abandoned the match, so neither Hall's goal nor Charman's appearance count towards their records. He was recalled by Newcastle in January 2019.

Charman captained Newcastle U23s at the start of the 2019–20 season, and scored a spectacular goal against Macclesfield Town in the EFL Trophy, but although he was hopeful of impressing manager Steve Bruce, he got no closer to the first team, and was released at the end of the season.

=== Darlington ===
On 14 July 2020, Charman joined National League North side Darlington on a free transfer. He made his debut in the first match of the season, and scored both his side's goals in a 2–2 draw with Prescot Cables in the FA Cup, but had been substituted by the time Darlington won the tie on penalties. He made six appearances in the National League North without scoring, but contributed six goals from eight cup matches. In the last of those, he suffered a medial ligament injury that was expected to keep him out for several weeks, by which time the season had been abandoned because of issues surrounding the COVID-19 pandemic. Charman signed a new two-year contract in July 2021, his fitness improved, and he scored freely during the first half of the season, with 12 goals from 16 league appearances. Charman was keen to return to full-time football, and his club's refusal to accept an offer from a National League team had led to "tough conversations" with the player. Manager Alun Armstrong told him that "if he works his socks off and does well", there would be interest from clubs at Football League level, and "then we'll wish him all the best and he'll move on". In the expectation of his imminent departure, Darlington signed striker Tyrone O'Neill in early January 2022.

=== Rochdale ===
Amid interest from clubs including Bradford City and Hartlepool United, Charman signed a two-and-a-half-year contract with Rochdale of League Two on 20 January 2022; the fee was undisclosed. After completing a four-match suspension imposed for a second sending-off while at Darlington, Charman made his Rochdale and Football League debut on 1 February, replacing Alex Newby after 58 minutes of a 1–1 draw away to Colchester United. Charman finally scored for Rochdale on 30 April, with two goals in the first 17 minutes of the match at home to Bristol Rovers, but the match ended as a 4–3 defeat. After a brief substitute appearance in the opening match of the 2022–23 season, a hamstring injury was to keep him out for some time.

=== AFC Fylde ===
Charman left Rochdale on 14 October to sign a two-year contract with National League North club AFC Fylde, who paid an undisclosed club-record fee for his services. He won the National League North title with the club at the end of the 2022–23 season.

=== Hartlepool United ===
On 5 June 2024, it was announced that Charman would sign for National League club Hartlepool United once his existing contract with AFC Fylde expired at the end of the month. He made his competitive debut for Hartlepool in the opening match of the 2024–25 season, a 1–0 victory against Yeovil Town. On 5 October, he scored his first Hartlepool goal in a 4–3 home win against Sutton United. He registered three assists in a 4–3 away win against Solihull Moors on 23 November. In his first season with the club, Charman made 43 appearances, scoring 4 times.

In February 2026, Charman suffered a serious ankle injury which ruled him out for the remainder of the 2025–26 season. He made 26 appearances during the season, scoring three goals and contributing four assists. On 22 May 2026, Charman signed a new contract with Hartlepool to keep him at the club until June 2027 with the option of a further year. In pre-season of the 2026–27 season, Charman suffered a strain to his medial collateral ligament which ruled him out for six to eight weeks, less than initially feared. He made his return to action on 26 September in a 4–1 defeat to Scunthorpe United.

== Career statistics ==
As of match played 21 November 2026

Appearances and goals by club, season and competition
Club	Season	League			FA Cup		League Cup		Other		Total	
Club	Season	Division	Apps	Goals	Apps	Goals	Apps	Goals	Apps	Goals	Apps	Goals
Newcastle United U21	2017–18	—			—		—		2 (Note: Appearance in EFL Trophy)	0	2	0
Newcastle United U21	2019–20	—			—		—		3	1	3	1
Newcastle United U21	Total		—		—		—		5	1	5	1
Newcastle United	2018–19	Premier League	0	0	—		0	0	—		0	0
Newcastle United	2019–20	Premier League	0	0	0	0	0	0	—		0	0
Newcastle United	Total		0	0	0	0	0	0	—		0	0
Accrington Stanley (loan)	2018–19	League One	0	0	1	0	—		3	0	4	0
Darlington	2020–21	National League North	6	0	5	4	—		3 (Note: Appearance(s) in FA Trophy)	2	14	6
Darlington	2021–22	National League North	16	12	2	0	—		1	1	19	13
Darlington	Total		22	12	7	4	—		4	3	33	19
Rochdale	2021–22	League Two	19	2	—		—		—		19	2
Rochdale	2022–23	League Two	1	0	—		0	0	0	0	1	0
Rochdale	Total		20	2	—		0	0	0	0	20	2
AFC Fylde	2022–23	National League North	30	4	3	1	—		1	0	34	5
AFC Fylde	2023–24	National League	25	3	2	0	—		2	1	29	4
AFC Fylde	Total		55	7	5	1	—		3	1	63	9
Hartlepool United	2024–25	National League	40	4	2	0	—		1	0	43	4
Hartlepool United	2025–26	National League	26	3	2	1	—		0	0	28	4
Hartlepool United	2026–27	National League	9	1	0	0	–		1	0	10	1
Hartlepool United	Total		75	8	4	1	—		2	0	81	9
Career total			172	29	17	6	0	0	17	5	206	40

== Honours ==
AFC Fylde

- National League North: 2022–23
