= Chris Popov =

Welsh footballer

Personal information
- Full name: Christopher Petrov Popov
- Date of birth: 26 October 2004 (age 22)
- Place of birth: Cardiff, Wales
- Positions: Forward; midfielder

Team information
- Current team: Hartlepool United
- Number: 19

Youth career
- –2021: Manchester United
- 2021–2024: Leicester City

Senior career*
Years	Team	Apps	(Gls)
2024–2026	Leicester City	0	(0)
2024–2025	→ Barrow (loan)	11	(0)
2026	→ Morecambe (loan)	18	(7)
2026–	Hartlepool United	16	(1)

International career^{‡}
2021	Wales U18	1	(0)
2021–2023	Wales U19	5	(2)
2023–	Wales U21	17	(3)
- * Club domestic league appearances and goals as of 23:18, 21 November 2026 (UTC) ‡ National team caps and goals as of 22:30, 14 November 2025 (UTC)

Christopher Petrov Popov (born 26 October 2004) is a Welsh professional footballer who plays as a forward or midfielder for National League club Hartlepool United. He is a Wales under-21 international.

== Club career ==
=== Leicester City ===
Popov joined the Leicester City academy in 2021 after being released by Manchester United. On 27 August 2024, he made his senior debut for the club as a 73rd-minute substitute in a 4–0 EFL Cup victory against Tranmere Rovers.

On 30 August 2024, Popov joined EFL League Two side Barrow on a season-long loan. He made his club and league debut a day later, starting in a 1–0 away win against Harrogate Town. He made 12 appearances in all competitions for Barrow.

On 21 January 2026, Popov joined National League side Morecambe on loan until the end of the season. He made 18 appearances for Morecambe, scoring seven times and contributing four assists.

On 24 May 2026, he was released by Leicester City following their relegation from the Championship.

=== Hartlepool United ===
On 27 June 2026, he signed for National League club Hartlepool United on a deal until June 2028. He started in the opening match of the 2026–27 season, a 2–0 home win against Barrow. His first goal came on 5 September in a 1–0 home win against Woking.

== International career ==
Born in Wales, Popov is of Bulgarian descent and is eligible to play for both Wales and Bulgaria.

== Career statistics ==
As of match played 21 November 2026

Appearances and goals by club, season and competition
Club	Season	League			FA Cup		EFL Cup		Other		Total	
Club	Season	Division	Apps	Goals	Apps	Goals	Apps	Goals	Apps	Goals	Apps	Goals
Leicester City U21	2022–23	—			—		—		3 (Note: Appearance(s) in EFL Trophy)	0	3	0
Leicester City U21	2023–24	—			—		—		1	0	1	0
Leicester City U21	2024–25	—			—		—		1	0	1	0
Leicester City U21	Total		—		—		—		5	0	5	0
Leicester City	2024–25	Premier League	0	0	0	0	1	0	—		1	0
Barrow (loan)	2024–25	League Two	11	0	1	0	0	0	0	0	12	0
Morecambe (loan)	2025–26	National League	18	7	–		–		–		18	7
Hartlepool United	2026–27	National League	16	1	1	0	–		4	1	21	2
Career total			45	8	2	0	1	0	9	1	57	9
