= Liam Gibson =

English footballer

Personal information
- Full name: Liam Steven Gibson
- Date of birth: 25 April 1997 (age 29)
- Place of birth: Stanley, England
- Height: 6 ft 1 in (1.85 m)
- Position: Left back

Team information
- Current team: Hartlepool United
- Number: 27

Senior career*
Years	Team	Apps	(Gls)
2015–2020	Newcastle United	0	(0)
2015	→ Gateshead (loan)	1	(0)
2019	→ Accrington Stanley (loan)	5	(0)
2019–2020	→ Grimsby Town (loan)	17	(0)
2020–2023	Morecambe	96	(1)
2023–2026	Harrogate Town	55	(0)
2026–	Hartlepool United	8	(0)
- * Club domestic league appearances and goals as of 14:54, 15 November 2026 (UTC)

Liam Steven Gibson (born 25 April 1997) is an English professional footballer who plays as a left back for National League club Hartlepool United.

== Career ==
Born in Stanley, Gibson began his career with Newcastle United, spending a short time on loan with Gateshead in 2015. He missed the entire 2017–18 season due to ill health, after suffering from ulcerative colitis.

He moved on loan to Accrington Stanley in January 2019, and on loan to Grimsby Town in July 2019.

He was released by Newcastle at the end of the 2019–20 season. In September 2020 he signed for Morecambe. He was offered a new contract by the club in June 2021, and signed a two-year deal later that month. He was released by the club at the end of the 2022–23 season, and it was announced that he would sign for Harrogate Town on 1 July. At the end of the 2025–26 season, he was released by Harrogate.

On 14 July 2026, Gibson signed for Hartlepool United on a one-year deal, with the option of a further year, following a successful trial. He started in the opening match of the 2026–27 season, a 2–0 home win against Barrow, but was withdrawn in the second half with an injury.

== Personal life ==
Gibson's younger brother Lewis is also a professional footballer.

== Career statistics ==
As of match played 14 November 2026

Appearances and goals by club, season and competition
Club	Season	League			FA Cup		League Cup		Other		Total	
Club	Season	Division	Apps	Goals	Apps	Goals	Apps	Goals	Apps	Goals	Apps	Goals
Newcastle United	2015–16	Premier League	0	0	0	0	0	0	0	0	0	0
Newcastle United	2016–17	Championship	0	0	0	0	0	0	0	0	0	0
Newcastle United	2017–18	Premier League	0	0	0	0	0	0	0	0	0	0
Newcastle United	2018–19	Premier League	0	0	0	0	0	0	0	0	0	0
Newcastle United	2019–20	Premier League	0	0	0	0	0	0	0	0	0	0
Newcastle United	Total		0	0	0	0	0	0	0	0	0	0
Gateshead (loan)	2015–16	National League	1	0	0	0	–		0	0	1	0
Accrington Stanley (loan)	2018–19	League One	5	0	0	0	0	0	0	0	5	0
Grimsby Town (loan)	2019–20	League Two	17	0	2	0	3	0	2 (Note: Appearance(s) in EFL Trophy)	0	24	0
Morecambe	2020–21	League Two	23	0	1	0	0	0	3 (Note: Appearances in play-offs)	0	27	0
Morecambe	2021–22	League One	29	1	1	0	1	0	2	0	33	1
Morecambe	2022–23	League One	44	0	1	0	3	0	3	0	51	0
Morecambe	Total		96	1	3	0	4	0	8	0	111	1
Harrogate Town	2023–24	League Two	29	0	1	0	2	0	2	0	34	0
Harrogate Town	2024–25	League Two	9	0	0	0	1	0	1	0	11	0
Harrogate Town	2025–26	League Two	17	0	0	0	1	0	1	0	19	0
Harrogate Town	Total		55	0	1	0	4	0	4	0	64	0
Hartlepool United	2026–27	National League	8	0	0	0	–		2	0	10	0
Career total			182	1	6	0	11	0	16	0	215	1

== Honours ==
Morecambe

- EFL League Two play-offs: 2021
