= Brooklyn Ilunga =

English footballer (born 2003)

Personal information
- Full name: Brooklyn Ilunga
- Date of birth: 21 November 2003 (age 23)
- Place of birth: Croydon, England
- Height: 1.77 m (5 ft 10 in)
- Position: Wing-back

Team information
- Current team: Hartlepool United
- Number: 7

Youth career
- 2010–2021: Milton Keynes Dons

Senior career*
Years	Team	Apps	(Gls)
2021–2025	Milton Keynes Dons	8	(0)
2022	→ Royston Town (loan)	7	(0)
2022	→ Hemel Hempstead Town (loan)	16	(0)
2023	→ Wealdstone (loan)	13	(0)
2023–2024	→ Wealdstone (loan)	5	(0)
2025–2026	Bromley	47	(0)
2026–	Hartlepool United	18	(1)
- * Club domestic league appearances and goals as of 23:12, 21 November 2026 (UTC)

Brooklyn Ilunga (born 21 November 2003) is an English professional footballer who plays as a wing-back or winger for Hartlepool United.

== Club career ==
Ilunga joined Milton Keynes Dons at the age of 7 and progressed through the club's academy before signing scholarship terms in August 2020. After featuring for the first team as a substitute on the final day of the 2020–21 season, Ilunga was handed the squad number 25 ahead of the 2021–22 campaign.

He signed professional terms in October 2021, the same month in which he made his first professional start, in a 2–1 home EFL Trophy group stage win over Wycombe Wanderers on 5 October 2021. On 22 February 2022, Ilunga joined Southern League Premier Central club Royston Town on loan for the remainder of the season. He concluded his debut year as a professional by being named Milton Keynes Dons Academy Player of the Year for the 2021–22 season.

On 1 September 2022, Ilunga joined National League South club Hemel Hempstead Town until January 2023. On 6 January 2023, Ilunga joined National League club Wealdstone on loan until the end of the season.

In January 2025, Ilunga joined League Two side Bromley on a permanent deal. Following the Ravens' title-winning campaign, Ilunga departed the club upon the expiry of his contract at the end of the 2025–26 season.

Ilunga signed for National League side Hartlepool United on effective 1 July 2026. He started in the opening match of the 2026–27 season, a 2–0 home win against Barrow, assisting the opener.

== Career statistics ==
As of match played 21 November 2026

Appearances and goals by club, season and competition
Club	Season	League			FA Cup		EFL Cup		Other		Total	
Club	Season	Division	Apps	Goals	Apps	Goals	Apps	Goals	Apps	Goals	Apps	Goals
Milton Keynes Dons	2020–21	League One	1	0	0	0	0	0	0	0	1	0
Milton Keynes Dons	2021–22	League One	1	0	1	0	0	0	5 (Note: Appearance(s) in EFL Trophy)	0	7	0
Milton Keynes Dons	2022–23	League One	0	0	0	0	1	0	1	0	2	0
Milton Keynes Dons	2023–24	League Two	3	0	—		1	0	3	0	7	0
Milton Keynes Dons	2024–25	League Two	3	0	0	0	0	0	3	0	6	0
Milton Keynes Dons	Total		8	0	1	0	2	0	12	0	23	0
Royston Town (loan)	2021–22	Southern Premier Central	7	0	—		—		4 (Note: Appearances in Southern League Challenge Cup and Herts Senior Cup)	1	11	1
Hemel Hempstead Town (loan)	2022–23	National League South	16	0	0	0	—		0	0	16	0
Wealdstone (loan)	2022–23	National League	13	0	—		—		—		13	0
Wealdstone (loan)	2023–24	National League	5	0	—		—		2 (Note: Appearances in FA Trophy)	0	7	0
Bromley	2024–25	League Two	17	0	—		—		—		17	0
Bromley	2025–26	League Two	26	0	1	0	0	0	3	0	30	0
Bromley	Total		43	0	1	0	0	0	3	0	47	0
Hartlepool United	2026–27	National League	18	1	1	0	–		3	0	22	1
Career total			110	1	3	0	2	0	24	1	139	2

== Honours ==
Royston Town

- Southern League Challenge Cup: 2021–22

Bromley

- EFL League Two: 2025–26

Individual

- Milton Keynes Dons Academy Player of the Year: 2021–22
