= Ryan Delaney =

Irish footballer (born 1996)

Personal information
- Full name: Ryan Liam Delaney
- Date of birth: 6 September 1996 (age 30)
- Place of birth: Wexford, Ireland
- Height: 1.96 m (6 ft 5 in)
- Position: Centre-back

Team information
- Current team: Oldham Athletic
- Number: 23

Senior career*
| Years | Team | Apps | (Gls) |
| 2014–2016 | Wexford | 42 | (2) |
| 2016–2018 | Burton Albion | 0 | (0) |
| 2017 | → Cork City (loan) | 30 | (6) |
| 2018–2020 | Rochdale | 48 | (3) |
| 2019–2020 | → AFC Wimbledon (loan) | 14 | (1) |
| 2020–2021 | Bolton Wanderers | 24 | (2) |
| 2021–2023 | Morecambe | 35 | (1) |
| 2022 | → Scunthorpe United (loan) | 17 | (0) |
| 2023–2024 | Newport County | 30 | (1) |
| 2024–2026 | Swindon Town | 21 | (1) |
| 2026 | → Newport County (loan) | 17 | (1) |
| 2026– | Oldham Athletic | 4 | (0) |

International career
| 2017–2018 | Republic of Ireland U21 | 5 | (0) |
- * Club domestic league appearances and goals as of 17:09, 2 May 2026 (UTC)

Ryan Liam Delaney (born 6 September 1996) is an Irish footballer who plays as a centre back for EFL League Two club Oldham Athletic.

== Club career ==
=== Wexford ===
Delaney joined Wexford's first team in the preseason of the 2014 season, making his debut on 21 March 2014 against Longford Town. He went on to make 12 league appearances that season. In 2015, Delaney made 16 league appearances and scored one goal against Shelbourne in a 4–1 win, as Wexford won the division. He made 16 league appearances, scoring one goal, in the first half of the 2016 Premier Division.

=== Burton Albion ===
Delaney moved to Championship club Burton Albion towards the end of July 2016.

==== Cork City (loan) ====
On 26 January 2017, Delaney moved on loan to League of Ireland Premier Division club Cork City on an initial six-month deal. He scored his first goal for City in a 4–0 win over Galway United at Turners Cross. After some strong performances, including a brace in a 4–1 home win over Shamrock Rovers, he won the Player of the Month award for May. Delaney extended his loan at City until the end of the season in late June. He continued to play in heart of the City defence as City won the league and FAI Cup. Delaney started in the final, as City beat Dundalk to claim the double for the first time in their history.

=== Rochdale ===
Delaney joined Rochdale on a permanent deal on 9 January 2018, signing a contract for two and half years. He made his first team debut against Millwall in the fourth round of the 2017–18 FA Cup on 28 January.

On 4 July 2018, Delaney signed a contract extension keeping him at the club until 2021.

==== AFC Wimbledon (loan ====
In September 2019 Delaney joined AFC Wimbledon on loan. He scored his first goal for the club in a 4–1 win at Southend United.

=== Bolton Wanderers ===
On 31 January 2020, Delaney signed for Bolton Wanderers on an 18-month contract. He scored his first goal for the club in a 2–2 draw with Burton Albion. At the end of the 2020–21 season, Bolton offered Delany a new contract. However, they were unable to come to an agreement and Delaney was released at the end of his contract.

=== Morecambe ===
On 22 June 2021, it was announced he would sign for Morecambe on a two-year contract once his Bolton contract expired joining former Bolton teammate Arthur Gnahoua who had also signed for Morecambe five days earlier. Delaney made his debut for the club on 7 August in a 2–2 draw with Ipswich Town.

==== Scunthorpe United (loan) ====
On 31 January 2022, Delaney joined EFL League Two side Scunthorpe United on loan for the remainder of the 2021–22 season reuniting with Manager Keith Hill for the third time in his career having played for him at Rochdale and Bolton.

=== Newport County ===
On 21 July 2023 Delaney joined EFL League Two club Newport County. He made his debut for Newport on 5 August 2023 in the starting line-up against Accrington Stanley. Delaney scored his first goal for Newport on 26 December 2023 in the 4–2 League Two win against Forest Green Rovers.

=== Swindon Town ===
Delaney was offered a contract extension by Newport but he chose to move on to EFL League Two Swindon Town in June 2024.

==== Newport County (loan) ====
On 14 January 2026 Delaney rejoined League Two club Newport County on loan for the remainder of the 2025–26 season. He made his second debut for Newport on 17 January 2026 in the EFL League Two 3–2 defeat to Gillingham.

Delaney was released by Swindon upon the expiry of his contract at the end of the 2025–26 season.

=== Oldham Athletic ===
On July 13, 2026, Delaney joined Oldham Athletic in a one-year contract

== International career ==
Delaney made his debut for the Republic of Ireland U21 side in a 3–1 win against Azerbaijan in a qualifying match for the U21 European Championship, coming on for Danny Kane in the 90th minute.

== Career statistics ==
=== Club ===
As of match played 26 February 2022

Appearances and goals by club, season and competition
| Club | Season | League | | | National Cup | | League Cup | | Other | | Total | |
| Club | Season | Division | Apps | Goals | Apps | Goals | Apps | Goals | Apps | Goals | Apps | Goals |
|---|---|---|---|---|---|---|---|---|---|---|---|---|
| Wexford | 2014 | League of Ireland First Division | 11 | 0 | 0 | 0 | 1 | 0 | 0 | 0 | 12 | 0 |
| Wexford | 2015 | League of Ireland First Division | 16 | 1 | 0 | 0 | 1 | 0 | 0 | 0 | 17 | 1 |
| Wexford | 2016 | League of Ireland Premier Division | 15 | 1 | 0 | 0 | 1 | 0 | 0 | 0 | 16 | 1 |
| Wexford | Total | | 42 | 2 | 0 | 0 | 3 | 0 | 0 | 0 | 45 | 2 |
| Burton Albion | 2016–17 | Championship | 0 | 0 | 0 | 0 | 0 | 0 | 0 | 0 | 0 | 0 |
| Burton Albion | 2017–18 | Championship | 0 | 0 | 0 | 0 | 0 | 0 | 0 | 0 | 0 | 0 |
| Burton Albion | Total | | 0 | 0 | 0 | 0 | 0 | 0 | 0 | 0 | 0 | 0 |
| Cork City (loan) | 2017 | League of Ireland Premier Division | 30 | 6 | 3 | 0 | 3 | 0 | 7 (Note: Appearance(s) in Europa League, President of Ireland's Cup, and Munster Senior Cup) | 0 | 43 | 6 |
| Rochdale | 2017–18 | League One | 18 | 2 | 4 | 0 | 0 | 0 | 0 | 0 | 22 | 2 |
| Rochdale | 2018–19 | League One | 30 | 1 | 2 | 0 | 2 | 1 | 1 (Note: Appearance(s) in EFL Trophy) | 0 | 35 | 2 |
| Rochdale | Total | | 48 | 3 | 6 | 0 | 2 | 1 | 1 | 0 | 57 | 4 |
| AFC Wimbledon (loan) | 2019–20 | League One | 14 | 1 | 1 | 0 | 0 | 0 | 1 | 0 | 16 | 1 |
| Bolton Wanderers | 2019–20 | League One | 4 | 1 | 0 | 0 | 0 | 0 | 0 | 0 | 4 | 1 |
| Bolton Wanderers | 2020–21 | League Two | 20 | 1 | 1 | 0 | 0 | 0 | 2 | 1 | 23 | 2 |
| Bolton Wanderers | Total | | 24 | 2 | 1 | 0 | 0 | 0 | 2 | 1 | 27 | 3 |
| Morecambe | 2021–22 | League One | 13 | 0 | 1 | 0 | 0 | 0 | 1 | 0 | 15 | 0 |
| Scunthorpe United (loan) | 2021–22 | League Two | 6 | 0 | 0 | 0 | 0 | 0 | 0 | 0 | 6 | 0 |
| Career total | | | 177 | 14 | 12 | 0 | 8 | 1 | 12 | 1 | 209 | 16 |

== Honours ==
Bolton Wanderers

- EFL League Two third-place promotion: 2020–21
