= Adam Smith (footballer, born 1992) =

English footballer (born 1992)

Personal information
- Full name: Adam Clifford Smith
- Date of birth: 23 November 1992 (age 33)
- Place of birth: Sunderland, England
- Height: 6 ft 4 in (1.93 m)
- Position: Goalkeeper

Team information
- Current team: Hartlepool United
- Number: 41

Youth career
- Middlesbrough
- 2010–2011: Leicester City

Senior career*
| Years | Team | Apps | (Gls) |
| 2011–2015 | Leicester City | 0 | (0) |
| 2011 | → Chesterfield (loan) | 0 | (0) |
| 2012 | → Lincoln City (loan) | 0 | (0) |
| 2012 | → Nuneaton Town (loan) | 7 | (0) |
| 2014 | → Stevenage (loan) | 0 | (0) |
| 2014 | → Cambridge United (loan) | 1 | (0) |
| 2015 | → Mansfield Town (loan) | 4 | (0) |
| 2015–2017 | Northampton Town | 86 | (0) |
| 2017–2019 | Bristol Rovers | 28 | (0) |
| 2019–2021 | Forest Green Rovers | 8 | (0) |
| 2019 | → Yeovil Town (loan) | 5 | (0) |
| 2020 | → Yeovil Town (loan) | 0 | (0) |
| 2020–2021 | → Yeovil Town (loan) | 42 | (0) |
| 2021–2022 | Stevenage | 9 | (0) |
| 2022–2024 | Morecambe | 16 | (0) |
| 2024– | Hartlepool United | 34 | (0) |
- * Club domestic league appearances and goals as of 22:15, 27 October 2026 (UTC)

Adam Clifford Smith (born 23 November 1992) is an English professional footballer who plays as a goalkeeper for National League club Hartlepool United. He is also the goalkeeping coach at Hartlepool.

== Career ==
=== Early career ===
Born in Sunderland, Smith joined Leicester City from Middlesbrough in 2010.

==== Early loan moves ====
On 16 September 2011 he was loaned to Chesterfield, but was only a backup to Greg Fleming during his spell.

In early January 2012 Smith joined Conference Premier club Lincoln City on loan, again as cover, until the end of the season.

On 25 October 2012, Smith signed for another Conference side in Nuneaton Town, on an initial one-month loan. Smith made his senior debut on 27 October in a 1–1 draw with Barrow, and went on to appear in seven games for the club.

On 11 January 2014 Smith was loaned to Football League One club Stevenage, in a one-month deal to provide cover following injuries to senior goalkeepers.

==== Cambridge United (loan) ====
On 25 April 2014, Smith moved to Conference Premier side Cambridge United on an emergency loan, following injuries to all of the club's senior goalkeepers. Smith made his debut the next day, in a 2–0 defeat to Gateshead on the final day of the League season. With Cambridge having already qualified for the 2013–14 Conference play-offs, Smith starred as Cambridge defeated FC Halifax Town 2–1 over two legs, Cambridge being 1–0 down after the first leg, to send the U's to Wembley and a chance at promotion to the Football League. On 18 May 2014, Smith played the full match as Cambridge defeated Gateshead 2–1 in the 2014 Conference play-off final, to earn promotion to League Two.

=== Return to Leicester ===
On 27 June 2014 he signed a new two-year deal with Leicester. Following an injury to first-choice goalkeeper Kasper Schmeichel, Smith was on the substitutes bench for nine Premier League games during the first half of the 2014–15 season as cover for Ben Hamer, as well as featuring for the Leicester City U21s, keeping a clean sheet against Schalke in the Premier League International Cup.

==== Mansfield Town (loan) ====
On 9 January 2015, Smith moved on a one-month loan to League Two club Mansfield Town after Leicester's signing of Mark Schwarzer moved Smith back down to third choice. The following day, Smith made his Football League debut, starting in a 2–1 away loss against Burton Albion in which he came up against fellow Leicester City loanee Jacob Blyth. On 17 June 2015, Smith's contract was terminated by Leicester City following a racist orgy during the club's promotional tour in Thailand.

=== Northampton Town ===
On 26 June 2015, Smith signed a two-year deal with League Two club Northampton Town. In his first season with The Cobblers, Smith made The Football League Team of the Season and PFA Team of the Year – as well as winning promotion to League One. He made 94 appearances in all competitions for Northampton.

=== Bristol Rovers ===
On 6 July 2017, Smith signed for League One club Bristol Rovers after leaving Northampton Town at the end of the season. He made his debut in a 1–0 away defeat to Charlton Athletic on 5 August 2017. He looked to have made an amazing save from a Patrick Bauer header tipping it onto the post, however the linesman and the referee judged that the ball had crossed the line.

He was released by Bristol Rovers at the end of the 2018–19 season.

=== Forest Green Rovers ===
Following his release from Bristol Rovers, Smith signed a two-year deal with Forest Green Rovers on 25 June 2019, active from 1 July 2019.

On 23 September 2019, Smith joined National League side Yeovil Town on a one-month loan deal. On 6 March 2020, Smith rejoined Yeovil on loan until the end of the 2019–20 season.

On 15 August 2020, Smith signed returned to Yeovil Town for a third loan spell on loan until the end of the 2020–21 season.

=== Stevenage ===
Smith signed for League Two club Stevenage on a short-term contract on 23 October 2021. He made his debut on the same day as his signing was announced, keeping a clean sheet in Stevenage's 0–0 draw with Leyton Orient.

On 22 January 2022, Stevenage confirmed that Smith had left the club.

=== Morecambe ===
On 4 February 2022, Smith joined League One side Morecambe on a short-term contract until the end of the 2021–22 season.

Although having initially departed the club following relegation at the end of the 2022–23 season, he signed a new one-year deal on 20 June 2023.

=== Hartlepool United ===
On 3 August 2024, he signed for National League side Hartlepool United on a short-term contract, rejoining his former manager at Yeovil Darren Sarll. After starting the season as the second choice goalkeeper behind Joel Dixon, he made his debut on 31 August in a match against Braintree Town after Dixon had suffered a first half injury, keeping a clean sheet in a 0–0 draw. On 7 October 2024, Smith was announced as Hartlepool's new goalkeeping coach. He lost his position as first choice goalkeeper to Brad Young before displacing Young in December. On 10 January 2025, Smith signed a new contract, keeping him with the club until the end of the 2025–26 season. He made 32 appearances in all competitions during the 2024–25 season.

He made three appearances in all competitions for the club during the 2025–26 season. On 16 June 2026, Smith signed a new contract to remain with the club for the 2026–27 season.

== Personal life ==
In May 2015, Smith and teammates James Pearson and Tom Hopper made a sex tape with local women on Leicester's tour of Thailand, which was obtained by the Sunday Mirror. The three players apologised for making the video, which included a racial epithet towards the women. However, the trio were sacked by the club on 17 June 2015.

== Career statistics ==
As of match played 27 October 2026

Appearances and goals by club, season and competition
| Club | Season | League | | | FA Cup | | EFL Cup | | Other | | Total | |
| Club | Season | Division | Apps | Goals | Apps | Goals | Apps | Goals | Apps | Goals | Apps | Goals |
|---|---|---|---|---|---|---|---|---|---|---|---|---|
| Leicester City | 2010–11 | Championship | 0 | 0 | 0 | 0 | 0 | 0 | — | | 0 | 0 |
| Leicester City | 2011–12 | Championship | 0 | 0 | 0 | 0 | 0 | 0 | — | | 0 | 0 |
| Leicester City | 2012–13 | Championship | 0 | 0 | 0 | 0 | 0 | 0 | 0 | 0 | 0 | 0 |
| Leicester City | 2013–14 | Championship | 0 | 0 | 0 | 0 | 0 | 0 | — | | 0 | 0 |
| Leicester City | 2014–15 | Premier League | 0 | 0 | 0 | 0 | 0 | 0 | — | | 0 | 0 |
| Leicester City | Total | | 0 | 0 | 0 | 0 | 0 | 0 | 0 | 0 | 0 | 0 |
| Chesterfield (loan) | 2011–12 | League One | 0 | 0 | 0 | 0 | 0 | 0 | 0 | 0 | 0 | 0 |
| Lincoln City (loan) | 2011–12 | Conference Premier | 0 | 0 | 0 | 0 | — | | 0 | 0 | 0 | 0 |
| Nuneaton Town (loan) | 2012–13 | Conference Premier | 7 | 0 | 0 | 0 | — | | 1 (Note: Appearance in FA Trophy) | 0 | 8 | 0 |
| Stevenage (loan) | 2013–14 | League One | 0 | 0 | 0 | 0 | 0 | 0 | 0 | 0 | 0 | 0 |
| Cambridge United (loan) | 2013–14 | Conference Premier | 1 | 0 | 0 | 0 | — | | 3 (Note: Appearances in Conference Premier play-offs) | 0 | 4 | 0 |
| Mansfield Town (loan) | 2014–15 | League Two | 4 | 0 | 0 | 0 | 0 | 0 | 0 | 0 | 4 | 0 |
| Northampton Town | 2015–16 | League Two | 46 | 0 | 4 | 0 | 0 | 0 | 0 | 0 | 50 | 0 |
| Northampton Town | 2016–17 | League One | 40 | 0 | 1 | 0 | 3 | 0 | 0 | 0 | 44 | 0 |
| Northampton Town | Total | | 86 | 0 | 5 | 0 | 3 | 0 | 0 | 0 | 94 | 0 |
| Bristol Rovers | 2017–18 | League One | 23 | 0 | 1 | 0 | 1 | 0 | 1 (Note: Appearance(s) in EFL Trophy) | 0 | 26 | 0 |
| Bristol Rovers | 2018–19 | League One | 5 | 0 | 2 | 0 | 2 | 0 | 1 | 0 | 10 | 0 |
| Bristol Rovers | Total | | 28 | 0 | 3 | 0 | 3 | 0 | 2 | 0 | 36 | 0 |
| Forest Green Rovers | 2019–20 | League Two | 8 | 0 | 1 | 0 | 0 | 0 | 1 | 0 | 10 | 0 |
| Forest Green Rovers | 2020–21 | League Two | 0 | 0 | 0 | 0 | 0 | 0 | 0 | 0 | 0 | 0 |
| Forest Green Rovers | Total | | 8 | 0 | 1 | 0 | 0 | 0 | 1 | 0 | 10 | 0 |
| Yeovil Town (loan) | 2019–20 | National League | 5 | 0 | 0 | 0 | — | | 0 | 0 | 5 | 0 |
| Yeovil Town (loan) | 2020–21 | National League | 42 | 0 | 3 | 0 | — | | 0 | 0 | 45 | 0 |
| Yeovil Town (loan) | Total | | 47 | 0 | 3 | 0 | — | | 0 | 0 | 50 | 0 |
| Stevenage | 2021–22 | League Two | 9 | 0 | 2 | 0 | 0 | 0 | 1 | 0 | 12 | 0 |
| Morecambe | 2021–22 | League One | 1 | 0 | — | | — | | — | | 1 | 0 |
| Morecambe | 2022–23 | League One | 1 | 0 | 0 | 0 | 0 | 0 | 4 | 0 | 5 | 0 |
| Morecambe | 2023–24 | League Two | 14 | 0 | 3 | 0 | 0 | 0 | 3 | 0 | 20 | 0 |
| Morecambe | Total | | 16 | 0 | 3 | 0 | 0 | 0 | 7 | 0 | 26 | 0 |
| Hartlepool United | 2024–25 | National League | 31 | 0 | 0 | 0 | 0 | 0 | 1 | 0 | 32 | 0 |
| Hartlepool United | 2025–26 | National League | 2 | 0 | 0 | 0 | 0 | 0 | 1 | 0 | 3 | 0 |
| Hartlepool United | 2026–27 | National League | 1 | 0 | 0 | 0 | 0 | 0 | 0 | 0 | 1 | 0 |
| Hartlepool United | Total | | 34 | 0 | 0 | 0 | 0 | 0 | 2 | 0 | 36 | 0 |
| Career total | | | 240 | 0 | 17 | 0 | 6 | 0 | 17 | 0 | 280 | 0 |

== Honours ==
Cambridge United

- Conference Premier play-offs: 2014

Northampton Town

- Football League Two: 2015–16

Individual

- The Football League Team of the Season: 2015–16
- PFA Team of the Year: 2015–16 League Two
