= National League Cup =

National League Cup is the name of:

- National League Cup (football), a men's football competition in England
- FA Women's National League Cup, a women's football competition in England
- National League Cup (rugby), a defunct rugby league competition in the UK
