= Louis Stephenson (footballer) =

English footballer

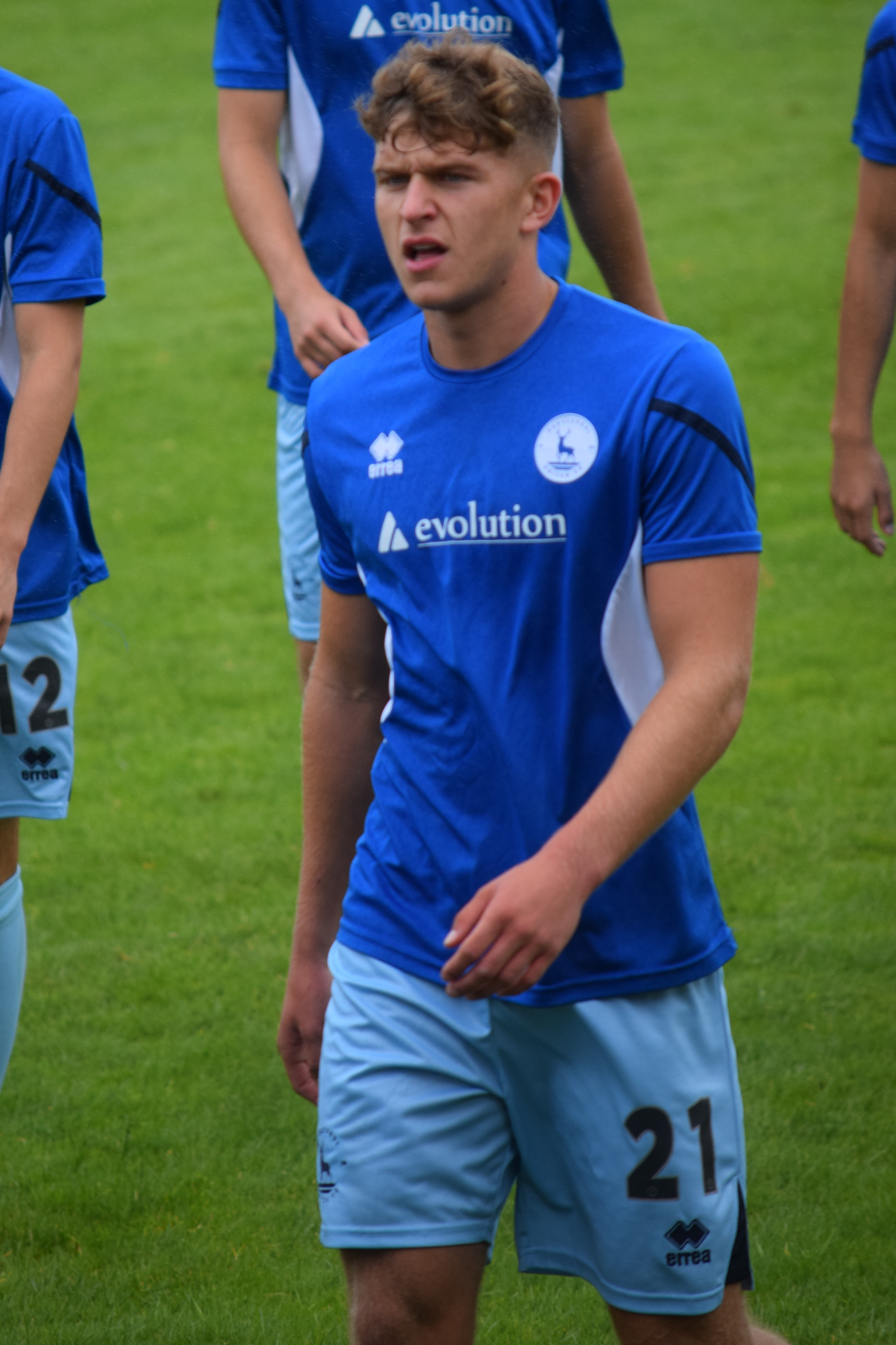
- Louis Stephenson warming up for Hartlepool United in 2024

Personal information
- Full name: Louis Stephenson
- Date of birth: 10 October 2005 (age 21)
- Position: Defender

Team information
- Current team: Spennymoor Town

Youth career
- 2021–2023: Hartlepool United

Senior career*
Years	Team	Apps	(Gls)
2022–2026	Hartlepool United	33	(0)
2024	→ Blyth Spartans (loan)	4	(0)
2024–2025	→ Whitby Town (loan)	6	(0)
2025	→ Buxton (loan)	9	(1)
2026	→ Morpeth Town (loan)	4	(0)
2026	→ Spennymoor Town (loan)	10	(0)
2026–	Spennymoor Town	0	(0)
- * Club domestic league appearances and goals as of 13:53, 27 April 2026 (UTC)

Louis Stephenson (born 10 October 2005) is a professional footballer who plays as a defender for National League North club Spennymoor Town.

== Career ==
=== Hartlepool United ===
Stephenson began his playing career at Hartlepool United and made his first appearance an FA Cup second round victory over Harrogate Town on 26 November 2022.

On 12 December 2023, Stephenson scored his first goal in professional football in a 5–1 win in the FA Trophy away to City of Liverpool. Later that month, he made his first league appearance against Oldham Athletic. He followed this up by signing his first professional contract with the club on 29 December 2023.

In September 2024, he signed for Northern Premier League Premier Division division club Blyth Spartans on a 28-day loan deal. On 30 November 2024, he signed for Whitby Town on a short-term loan deal.

In September 2025, Stephenson signed for National League North side Buxton on a one-month loan deal. After impressing with Buxton, his loan deal was extended – however, he was recalled by Hartlepool in January 2026. Upon returning to Pools, he went out on loan again; this time to Morpeth Town on a one-month loan deal until February 2026.

=== Spennymoor Town ===
On 17 March 2026, Stephenson signed on loan for National League North side Spennymoor Town until the end of the season.

In May 2026, it was announced that Stephenson was to join Spennymoor permanently following his release from Hartlepool. In pre-season ahead of the 2026–27 season, Stephenson suffered a serious knee injury.

== Career statistics ==
As of match played 25 April 2026

Appearances and goals by club, season and competition
Club	Season	League			FA Cup		League Cup		Other		Total	
Club	Season	Division	Apps	Goals	Apps	Goals	Apps	Goals	Apps	Goals	Apps	Goals
Hartlepool United	2022–23	League Two	0	0	2	0	0	0	0	0	2	0
Hartlepool United	2023–24	National League	16	0	0	0	0	0	2 (Note: Appearance(s) in FA Trophy)	1	18	1
Hartlepool United	2024–25	National League	17	0	0	0	0	0	0	0	17	0
Hartlepool United	2025–26	National League	0	0	0	0	0	0	1	0	1	0
Hartlepool United	Total		33	0	2	0	0	0	3	1	38	1
Blyth Spartans (loan)	2024–25	Northern Premier League Premier Division	4	0	0	0	0	0	0	0	4	0
Whitby Town (loan)	2024–25	Northern Premier League Premier Division	6	0	0	0	0	0	0	0	6	0
Buxton (loan)	2025–26	National League North	9	1	1	0	0	0	0	0	10	1
Morpeth Town (loan)	2025–26	Northern Premier League Premier Division	4	0	0	0	0	0	0	0	4	0
Spennymoor Town (loan)	2025-26	National League North	10	0	0	0	0	0	0	0	10	0
Career total			66	1	3	0	0	0	2	1	71	2
