= 2023–24 Barrow A.F.C. season =

123rd season in existence of Barrow AFC

Barrow
2023–24 season
- Chairman: Paul Hornby
- Manager: Pete Wild
- Stadium: Holker Street
- League Two: 8th
- FA Cup: Second round
- EFL Cup: First round
- EFL Trophy: Group stage
- Top goalscorer: League: Kian Spence (9); All: Ben Whitfield (11)
Home colours

The 2023–24 season was the 123rd season in the history of Barrow and their fourth consecutive season in League Two. They participated in League Two, the FA Cup, the EFL Cup, and the 2023–24 EFL Trophy.

Barrow enjoyed one of the best seasons in their history, including a 15-match unbeaten run between October and December, finishing the season in 8th place, narrowly missing out on a promotion play-off spot.

== Squad statistics ==
As of 6 January 2024

No.	Pos	Nat	Player	Total		League Two		FA Cup		League Cup		EFL Trophy	
No.	Pos	Nat	Player	Apps	Goals	Apps	Goals	Apps	Goals	Apps	Goals	Apps	Goals
1	GK	(England) ENG	Paul Farman	25	0	24+0	0	0+0	0	1+0	0	0+0	0
3	DF	(Republic of Ireland) IRL	Mazeed Ogungbo	5	0	1+4	0	0+0	0	0+0	0	0+0	0
4	MF	(Scotland) SCO	Dean Campbell	27	3	21+5	3	0+0	0	1+0	0	0+0	0
5	DF	(Wales) WAL	George Ray	25	3	24+0	3	0+0	0	1+0	0	0+0	0
6	DF	(Republic of Ireland) IRL	Niall Canavan	27	2	26+0	2	0+0	0	1+0	0	0+0	0
7	MF	(England) ENG	David Worrall	19	0	14+3	0	0+0	0	0+1	0	1+0	0
8	MF	(England) ENG	Kian Spence	26	4	22+3	4	0+0	0	0+1	0	0+0	0
9	FW	(England) ENG	Jamie Proctor	13	1	7+6	1	0+0	0	0+0	0	0+0	0
10	FW	(England) ENG	Gerard Garner	20	2	9+9	2	0+0	0	0+1	0	1+0	0
11	MF	(England) ENG	Elliot Newby	26	0	21+3	0	0+0	0	0+1	0	1+0	0
12	GK	(England) ENG	Josh Lillis	3	0	2+0	0	0+0	0	0+0	0	1+0	0
13	MF	(England) ENG	Tom White	22	0	14+7	0	0+0	0	1+0	0	0+0	0
14	FW	(Republic of Ireland) IRL	Courtney Duffus	8	0	2+4	0	0+0	0	1+0	0	1+0	0
15	MF	(England) ENG	Robbie Gotts	23	0	12+9	0	0+0	0	1+0	0	1+0	0
16	MF	(Republic of Ireland) IRL	Sam Foley	27	3	8+17	3	0+0	0	1+0	0	1+0	0
17	DF	(Wales) WAL	James Chester	20	1	17+2	1	0+0	0	0+0	0	1+0	0
18	MF	(England) ENG	Luca Stephenson	16	0	8+7	0	0+0	0	0+0	0	1+0	0
19	FW	(England) ENG	Dom Telford	20	3	13+7	3	0+0	0	0+0	0	0+0	0
20	FW	(England) ENG	Emile Acquah	27	5	16+10	5	0+0	0	0+1	0	0+0	0
21	DF	(England) ENG	Tyrell Warren	10	1	6+2	1	0+0	0	1+0	0	1+0	0
24	DF	(Republic of Ireland) IRL	Rory Feely	19	0	9+8	0	0+0	0	1+0	0	1+0	0
29	DF	(England) ENG	Junior Tiensia	10	0	5+4	0	0+0	0	1+0	0	0+0	0
34	MF	(England) ENG	Ben Whitfield	16	6	6+10	6	0+0	0	0+0	0	0+0	0
35	MF	(Republic of Ireland) IRL	Owen Bray	1	0	0+0	0	0+0	0	0+0	0	0+1	0
37	FW	(England) ENG	Sean Etaluku	3	0	0+2	0	0+0	0	0+0	0	0+1	0
39	FW	(England) ENG	Sam Bellis	1	0	0+0	0	0+0	0	0+0	0	0+1	0

== Transfers ==
=== In ===
Date	Pos	Player	Transferred from	Fee	Ref.
14 June 2023	DM	Kian Spence (ENG)	FC Halifax Town (ENG)	Undisclosed	
28 June 2023	CB	Mazeed Ogungbo (IRL)	Arsenal (ENG)	Undisclosed	
1 July 2023	DM	Dean Campbell (SCO)	Aberdeen (SCO)	Free transfer	
1 July 2023	CF	Courtney Duffus (IRL)	Morecambe (ENG)	Free transfer	
1 July 2023	CF	Jamie Proctor (ENG)	Port Vale (ENG)	Free transfer	
1 July 2023	LB	Junior Tiensia (ENG)	Solihull Moors (ENG)	Free transfer	
1 July 2023	RM	David Worrall (ENG)	Port Vale (ENG)	Free transfer	
11 July 2023	CF	Emile Acquah (ENG)	Maidenhead United (ENG)	Undisclosed	
25 July 2023	CM	Owen Bray (IRL)	Leeds United (ENG)	Free transfer	
23 August 2023	CF	Sam Bellis (ENG)	Southampton (ENG)	Free transfer	
25 August 2023	CF	Dom Telford (ENG)	Crawley Town (ENG)	Undisclosed	
1 September 2023	CB	James Chester (WAL)	Derby County (ENG)	Free transfer	

=== Out ===
Date	Pos	Player	Transferred to	Fee	Ref.
30 June 2023	LB	Patrick Brough (ENG)	Northampton Town (ENG)	Rejected Contract	
30 June 2023	CB	Mark Ellis (ENG)	Chorley (ENG)	Released	
30 June 2023	CF	Josh Gordon (ENG)	Burton Albion (ENG)	Free transfer	
30 June 2023	CB	Joe Grayson (ENG)	Gateshead (ENG)	Released	
30 June 2023	GK	Scott Moloney (ENG)	Free agent	Released	
30 June 2023	CF	David Moyo (ZIM)	Chorley (ENG)	Released	
30 June 2023	AM	Solomon Nwabuokei (ENG)	Eastleigh (ENG)	Released	
30 June 2023	CF	Benni Smales-Braithwaite (ENG)	Vendsyssel FF (DEN)	Released	
30 June 2023	CM	Jason Taylor (ENG)	Retired	—	
30 June 2023	CB	Paweł Żuk (POL)	FC United of Manchester (ENG)	Released	
10 August 2023	LM	Josh Kay (ENG)	AFC Fylde (ENG)	Free transfer	

=== Loaned in ===
Date	Pos	Player	Loaned from	Until	Ref.
1 September 2023	DM	Luca Stephenson (ENG)	Liverpool (ENG)	End of season	
17 January 2024	CF	Cole Stockton (ENG)	Burton Albion (ENG)	End of season	

=== Loaned out ===
Date	Pos	Player	Loaned to	Fee	Ref.
17 November 2023	CB	Malakai Reeve (ENG)	FC United of Manchester (ENG)	16 December 2023	
8 January 2024	CF	Courtney Duffus (IRL)	Hartlepool United (ENG)	End of season	
16 January 2024	CF	Gerard Garner (ENG)	Morecambe (ENG)	End of season	
19 January 2024	CF	Sam Bellis (ENG)	Kidderminster Harriers (ENG)	End of season	
8 March 2024	CB	Malakai Reeve (ENG)	Blyth Spartans (ENG)	End of season	
29 March 2024	RW	Sean Etaluku (ENG)	Buxton (ENG)	End of season	

== Pre-season and friendlies ==
On 17 May, Barrow announced their first two pre-season friendlies, against Holker Old Boys and Oldham Athletic. In June, the club confirmed further friendlies, against FC United of Manchester, AFC Fylde, Blackpool and Newcastle United U21. On 12 June, the club announced a final pre-season friendly, against Preston North End.

Win Draw Loss Fixtures

8 July 2023 Friendly	FC United of Manchester	0–2	Barrow	Moston
15:00 BST		Report	Warren 78', 86'	Stadium: Broadhurst Park; Attendance: 743

11 July 2023 Friendly	Holker Old Boys	1–8	Barrow	Barrow-in-Furness
19:45 BST	Hodgson 30'	Report	Campbell 27', 33' (pen.), 43'; 35' (o.g.); Proctor 48'; Garner 67'; White 70'; Whitfield 77'	Stadium: Rakesmoor Lane

15 July 2023 Friendly	Barrow	1–0	Preston North End	Barrow-in-Furness
15:00 BST	Worrall 5'	Report		Stadium: Holker Street; Attendance: 2,026; Referee: Marc Edwards

18 July 2023 Friendly	AFC Fylde	0–2	Barrow	Medlar-with-Wesham
19:45 BST		Report	Garner 58'; Trialist 68'	Stadium: Mill Farm Sports Village

22 July 2023 Friendly	Barrow	0–5	Blackpool	Barrow-in-Furness
15:00 BST			Virtue 14'; Lavery 16'; Beesley 55'; Carey 79', 90+4'	Stadium: Holker Street

25 July 2023 Friendly	Barrow	1–1	Oldham Athletic	Barrow-in-Furness
19:45 BST	Foley 18'	Report	Nuttall 32'	Stadium: Holker Street

29 July 2023 Friendly	Barrow	4–1	Newcastle United U21	Barrow-in-Furness
15:00 BST	Acquah 21'; Worrall 25'; Campbell 38'; Proctor 45+2'	Report	Diallo 56'	Stadium: Holker Street; Attendance: 1,290

== Competitions ==
=== Overall record ===
Competition	Starting round	Final position	Record							
Competition	Starting round	Final position	Pld	W	D	L	GF	GA	GD	Win %
League Two	Matchday 1		45	18	14	13	61	55	+6	40.00
FA Cup	First round	Second round	2	1	0	1	4	3	+1	50.00
EFL Cup	First round	First round	1	0	0	1	0	1	−1	0.00
EFL Trophy	Group stage	Group stage	3	1	0	2	3	6	−3	33.33
Total			51	20	14	17	68	65	+3	39.22

Last updated: 23 April 2024
Source: Soccerway

=== League Two ===
==== League table ====
Pos	Team	Pld	W	D	L	GF	GA	GD	Pts	Promotion, qualification or relegation
5	Doncaster Rovers	46	21	8	17	73	68	+5	71	Qualified for League Two play-offs
6	Crewe Alexandra	46	19	14	13	69	65	+4	71	Qualified for League Two play-offs
7	Crawley Town (O, P)	46	21	7	18	73	67	+6	70	Qualified for League Two play-offs
8	Barrow	46	18	15	13	62	56	+6	69	
9	Bradford City	46	19	12	15	61	59	+2	69	
10	AFC Wimbledon	46	17	14	15	64	51	+13	65	
11	Walsall	46	18	11	17	69	73	−4	65	

Source: EFL Official Website
Rules for classification: 1) Points; 2) Goal difference; 3) Number of goals scored; 4) Head-to-head results; 5) Wins; 6) Away goals; 7) Penalty points (sec 9.5); 8) 12-point sending off offences
(O) Play-off winners; (P) Promoted

==== Results summary ====
Overall								Home						Away					
Pld	W	D	L	GF	GA	GD	Pts	W	D	L	GF	GA	GD	W	D	L	GF	GA	GD
45	18	14	13	61	55	+6	68	11	6	4	26	17	+9	7	8	9	35	38	−3

Last updated: 23 April 2024.
Source: Soccerway

==== Matches ====
On 22 June, the EFL League Two fixtures were released.

Win Draw Loss Fixtures

5 August 2023 1	Tranmere Rovers	1–2	Barrow	Birkenhead
15:00 BST	O'Connor (yellow card) 35'; Hawkes 63' (pen.); Hendry (yellow card) 90+6'	Report	Canavan 19'; Campbell (yellow card) 37'; Ray (yellow card) 51'; Spence 70'	Stadium: Prenton Park; Attendance: 6,584; Referee: Ollie Yates

12 August 2023 2	Barrow	2–1	Sutton United	Barrow-in-Furness
15:00 BST	Acquah 79'; Proctor 82'	Report	Smith (red card) 13'; Angol 33'; Rose (yellow card) 76'	Stadium: Holker Street; Attendance: 3,003; Referee: Martin Woods

15 August 2023 3	Accrington Stanley	1–1	Barrow	Accrington
19:45 BST	McConville 36'; Hills (yellow card) 71'; Adedoyin (yellow card) 83'	Report	Spence (yellow card) 51'; Acquah 87'	Stadium: Crown Ground; Attendance: 2,204; Referee: Andrew Kitchen

19 August 2023 4	Stockport County	1–0	Barrow	Edgeley
15:00 BST	Knoyle (yellow card) 21'; Collar (yellow card) 26'; Barry 66'	Report	Foley (yellow card) 30'	Stadium: Edgeley Park; Attendance: 8,364; Referee: Peter Wright

26 August 2023 5	Barrow	1–1	Wrexham	Barrow-in-Furness
15:00 BST	Warren (yellow card) 45'; Acquah 52'; White (yellow card) 57'; Canavan (yellow card) 88'	Report	Lee 12' (pen.); O'Connell (yellow card) 47'; O'Connor (yellow card) 58'	Stadium: Holker Street; Attendance: 4,789; Referee: Daniel Middleton

2 September 2023 6	Harrogate Town	0–1	Barrow	Harrogate
15:00 BST	Ramsay (yellow card) 36'; Muldoon (penalty missed) 61'; O'Connor (yellow card) 72'	Report	Spence 21'; Telford (yellow card) 28'; White (yellow card) 59'	Stadium: Wetherby Road; Attendance: 1,968; Referee: Scott Jackson

16 September 2023 8	Newport County	1–1	Barrow	Newport
15:00 BST	Delaney (yellow card) 5' (yellow-red card) 43'; Bennett (yellow card) 14'; Bogle (penalty missed) 16'; Morris (yellow card) 20'; McLoughlin 40'	Report	Canavan (yellow card) 28'; Campbell 69' (pen.); Gotts (yellow card) 73'	Stadium: Rodney Parade; Attendance: 3,539; Referee: Martin Coy

23 September 2023 9	Mansfield Town	1–0	Barrow	Mansfield
15:00 BST	Macdonald (yellow card) 70'; Clarke 72'; Lewis (yellow card) 82'	Report	Gotts (yellow card) 82'; Tiensia (red card) 83'	Stadium: Field Mill; Attendance: 6,714; Referee: Marc Edwards

30 September 2023 10	Barrow	3–2	Doncaster Rovers	Barrow-in-Furness
15:00 BST	Warren 12' (yellow card) 22'; Garner (yellow card) 36' (goal) 53'; Gotts (yellow card) 57'; Spence (yellow card) 65'; Acquah 85'	Report	Close (yellow card) 11'; Westbrooke (yellow card) 26'; Biggins (yellow card) 32'; Ironside 56'; Faal 90+3'	Stadium: Holker Street; Attendance: 3,502; Referee: Scott Oldham

3 October 2023 11	Grimsby Town	2–1	Barrow	Cleethorpes
19:45 BST	Eisa (penalty missed) 18'; Conteh (yellow card) 32'; Rose 37'; Wilson 75'	Report	Chester (yellow card) 45+3'; Foley 79'	Stadium: Blundell Park; Attendance: 4,882; Referee: Thomas Kirk

7 October 2023 12	Barrow	1–1	Notts County	Barrow-in-Furness
15:00 BST	Feely (yellow card) 63'; Campbell 79' (pen.)	Report	McGoldrick 14' (pen.); Adebayo-Rowling (yellow card) 30'; Austin (yellow card) 81'; Brindley (yellow card) 90+2'	Stadium: Holker Street; Attendance: 4,122; Referee: Ben Toner

14 October 2023 13	Milton Keynes Dons	2–2	Barrow	Denbigh
15:00 BST	Robson (yellow card) 6'; Dean 12', 35'; Norman (yellow card) 49'	Report	Farman (yellow card) 12'; Gotts (yellow card) 45+1'; Whitfield 90+3'; Acquah 90+5'	Stadium: Stadium mk Attendance: 5,725; Referee: Will Finnie

21 October 2023 14	Barrow	0–0	AFC Wimbledon	Barrow-in-Furness
15:00 BST		Report	Little (yellow card) 48'; Tilley (yellow card) 80'	Stadium: Holker Street; Attendance: 3,466; Referee: Scott Tallis

24 October 2023 15	Forest Green Rovers	0–2	Barrow	Nailsworth
19:45 GMT	Omotoye (yellow card) 58'; Robson (yellow card) 90+4'	Report	Foley 4'; Telford 18'; Ray (yellow card) 49'	Stadium: The New Lawn; Attendance: 1,440; Referee: Tom Reeves

28 October 2023 16	Barrow	0–0	Salford City	Barrow-in-Furness
15:00 BST	Gotts (yellow card) 2'; Spence (yellow card) 31'	Report		Stadium: Holker Street; Attendance: 3,053; Referee: Jacob Miles

31 October 2023 7	Barrow	1–0	Morecambe	Barrow-in-Furness
19:45 GMT	Telford 29'; Farman (yellow card) 90+2'	Report	Senior (yellow card) 26'	Stadium: Holker Street; Attendance: 4,007; Referee: Ben Speedie
Note: Fixture was previous postponed due to international call-ups.

11 November 2023 17	Bradford City	1–2	Barrow	Bradford
15:00 GMT	Smith 33'; Halliday (yellow card) 50'; Cook (yellow card) 77'	Report	Telford 1'; Spence (yellow card) 38'; White (yellow card) 45+5'; Ray 77'	Stadium: Valley Parade; Attendance: 17,247; Referee: David Webb

18 November 2023 18	Barrow	1–0	Crawley Town	Barrow-in-Furness
15:00 GMT	Telford 46'; Acquah (yellow card) 58'; Proctor (yellow card) 72'	Report	Campbell (yellow card) 18'; Maguire (yellow card) 47'; Wright (yellow card) 64'	Stadium: Holker Street; Attendance: 3,512; Referee: Seb Stockbridge

25 November 2023 19	Colchester United	1–4	Barrow	Colchester
15:00 GMT	McGeehan 20' (yellow card) 37'; Tovide (yellow card) 45+5'; Fevrier (yellow card) 51' (yellow-red card) 84'	Report	Stephenson (yellow card) 7'; Telford (yellow card) 43'; Proctor (yellow card) 45+5'; Greenidge 52' (o.g.); Ray 86', 90+3'; Mitchell 90+4' (o.g.)	Stadium: Colchester Community Stadium; Attendance: 3,263; Referee: Declan Bourne

28 November 2023 20	Barrow	2–0	Walsall	Barrow-in-Furness
19:45 GMT	Whitfield 11'; Acquah (yellow card) 44'; Canavan 70'	Report	Daniels (yellow card) 25'; Farquharson (yellow card) 54'	Stadium: Holker Street; Attendance: 3,072; Referee: Lewis Smith

16 December 2023 22	Swindon Town	0–3	Barrow	Swindon
15:00 GMT	Kinsella (yellow card) 65'	Report	Spence 34'; Foley 58'; Chester 73'; Garner (yellow card) 83'	Stadium: County Ground; Attendance: 7,463; Referee: Craig Hicks

22 December 2023 23	Crewe Alexandra	1–3	Barrow	Crewe
19:45 GMT	Nevitt (yellow card) 40', (goal) 58'; Baker-Richardson (yellow card) 64'; Demetriou (yellow card) 66'; Thomas (yellow card) 68'	Report	Whitfield 27', 76'; Spence (yellow card) 34'; Garner 50' (pen.); White (yellow card) 61'; Farman (yellow card) 84'; Gotts (yellow card) 90'	Stadium: Gresty Road; Attendance: 7,646; Referee: Alan Young
Note: Fixture was originally scheduled for 23 December but was moved to a day earlier.

26 December 2023 24	Barrow	2–2	Stockport County	Barrow-in-Furness
15:00 GMT	Whitfield 2'; Spence 24'; Ray (yellow card) 53'; Foley (yellow card) 62'	Report	Powell 45+2'; Madden (yellow card) 49'; Wright 54', (yellow card) 72'; Horsfall (yellow card) 69'; Wootton (yellow card) 90+4'	Stadium: Holker Street; Attendance: 5,866; Referee: Martin Coy

29 December 2023 25	Barrow	1–1	Accrington Stanley	Barrow-in-Furness
19:45 GMT	Whitfield 52'	Report	Whalley (yellow card) 2'; Martin (yellow card) 44'; Gubbins (yellow card) 47'; B. Woods (yellow card) 61'; Pritchard 71'; Shipley (yellow card) 87'; J. Woods (yellow card) 90+2'	Stadium: Holker Street; Attendance: 3,549; Referee: Simon Mather

1 January 2024 26	Wrexham	4–1	Barrow	Wrexham
15:00 GMT	McClean (yellow card) 45+4'; Fletcher 45+9', 45+13', 67'; Mullin 45+11'	Report	Spence 1', (yellow card) 77'; White (yellow card) 45+10'; Proctor (yellow card) 90+5'; Ray (yellow card) 90+10'	Stadium: Racecourse Ground; Attendance: 12,323; Referee: Scott Oldham

6 January 2024 27	Barrow	1–0	Tranmere Rovers	Barrow-in-Furness
15:00 GMT	Campbell 80'; Foley (yellow card) 88'	Report	Walker (yellow card) 39'; Norris (yellow card) 73'	Stadium: Holker Street; Attendance: 4,023; Referee: Adam Herczeg

13 January 2024 28	Sutton United	2–2	Barrow	Sutton
15:00 GMT	Beautyman (yellow card) 30' (goal) 44', 53'	Report	Whitfield 36'; Canavan 73'	Stadium: Gander Green Lane; Attendance: 2,940; Referee: Paul Howard

20 January 2024 29	Barrow	1–3	Crewe Alexandra	Barrow-in-Furness
15:00 GMT	Gotts 9'; Chester (yellow card) 90+6'	Report	Tracey (yellow card) 9'; Nevitt 19', (yellow card) 90+7'; Billington 64', (yellow card) 80'; Holíček 84'; Demetriou (yellow card) 86'; Offord (yellow card) 90+2'; O'Riordan (yellow card) 90+4'	Stadium: Holker Street; Attendance: 3,757; Referee: Thomas Parsons

27 January 2024 30	Notts County	1–1	Barrow	Nottingham
15:00 GMT	Nemane 45+1'; Baldwin (yellow card) 79'	Report	Ray (yellow card) 20'; Spence 22'; Foley (yellow card) 24'; Campbell (yellow card) 70'; Stephenson (yellow card) 78'	Stadium: Meadow Lane; Attendance: 11,243; Referee: Alex Chilowicz

3 February 2024 31	Barrow	1–0	Milton Keynes Dons	Barrow-in-Furness
15:00 GMT	Canavan (yellow card) 38'; Ray (yellow card) 55'; Stockton 78'; Farman (yellow card) 90+6'	Report	Williams (yellow card) 51'; Tomlinson (yellow card) 53'	Stadium: Holker Street; Attendance: 3,501; Referee: Tom Reeves

10 February 2024 32	AFC Wimbledon	2–0	Barrow	Wimbledon
15:00 GMT	Curtis 16'; Chaaban 26'; Balmer (yellow card) 45+3'; Ball (yellow card) 55'; O'Toole (yellow card) 55'	Report	Stephenson (yellow card) 31'; White (yellow card) 84'; Proctor (red card) 87'	Stadium: Plough Lane; Attendance: 7,373; Referee: Scott Simpson

13 February 2024 33	Barrow	1–2	Forest Green Rovers	Barrow-in-Furness
19:45 GMT	Stockton 29'; Campbell (yellow card) 89'	Report	McAllister 21', (yellow card) 50'; Dabo (yellow card) 41'; Osadebe 57'; McCann (yellow card) 85'	Stadium: Holker Street; Attendance: 3,029; Referee: Lewis Smith

17 February 2024 34	Salford City	5–3	Barrow	Kersal
15:00 GMT	Hendry 26', 67'; Luamba (yellow card) 40'; Watt (yellow card) 54'; McAleny 57'; John (yellow card) 62'; Smith 77', 86'	Report	Stockton 42', 90'; Warren 47'; Worrall (yellow card) 87'	Stadium: Moor Lane; Attendance: 3,416; Referee: Sunny Sukhvir Gill

5 March 2024 21	Barrow	2–0	Gillingham	Barrow-in-Furness
19:45 GMT	Stockton (yellow card) 4'; Spence (yellow card) 9'; Chester 40'; Acquah 55'; Campbell (yellow card) 66'	Report	Coleman (yellow card) 39'; Williams (yellow card) 66'; Masterson (yellow card) 90+6'; Hutton (yellow card) 90+6'	Stadium: Holker Street; Attendance: 3,044; Referee: Scott Tallis
Note: Fixture was originally scheduled for 9 December, but was postponed due to unplayable playing surface.

9 March 2024 37	Barrow	2–0	Colchester United	Barrow-in-Furness
15:00 GMT	Spence 45+4'; Stephenson (yellow card) 83'; Foley 90+5'	Report	Richardson (yellow card) 13'; Ihionvien (yellow card) 81'; Hall (yellow card) 83'	Stadium: Holker Street; Attendance: 3,631; Referee: Scott Jackson

12 March 2024 38	Walsall	1–1	Barrow	Bescot
19:45 GMT	Menayese 38'; Foulkes (yellow card) 50'; Gordon (yellow card) 77'	Report	Campbell 53' (pen.); Ray (yellow card) 54'	Stadium: Bescot Stadium; Attendance: 4,737; Referee: Martin Woods

16 March 2024 39	Barrow	0–0	Harrogate Town	Barrow-in-Furness
15:00 GMT	Campbell (penalty missed) 26'; Warren (yellow card) 90'	Report	Dooley (yellow card) 86'	Stadium: Holker Street; Attendance: 3,472; Referee: Edward Duckworth

23 March 2024 40	Barrow	1–0	Newport County	Barrow-in-Furness
15:00 GMT	Stockton 20'; Ray (yellow card) 72'	Report	Payne (yellow card) 65'; Bright (yellow card) 76'	Stadium: Holker Street; Attendance: 3,379; Referee: Ben Speedie

29 March 2024 41	Barrow	3–1	Grimsby Town	Barrow-in-Furness
15:00 GMT	Stockton 11', 22'; Telford (yellow card) 72'; Gotts 82'	Report	Obikwu 89'	Stadium: Holker Street; Attendance: 4,024; Referee: Oliver Langford

1 April 2024 42	Morecambe	2–1	Barrow	Morecambe
15:00 GMT	Tutonda 3' (yellow card) 80'; Edwards 11'; Stokes (yellow card) 48'	Report	Campbell (yellow card) 31'; Ray (yellow card) 65'; Whitfield 89'	Stadium: Mazuma Stadium; Attendance: 4,878; Referee: Marc Edwards

6 April 2024 43	Barrow	0–2	Swindon Town	Barrow-in-Furness
15:00 BST	Gotts (yellow card) 51'; Ray (yellow card) 53'; Newby (yellow card) 82'	Report	Kokolo 35' (yellow card) 60'; Drinan (yellow card) 43'; Glatzel 45'	Stadium: Holker Street; Attendance: 3,502; Referee: Ben Toner

13 April 2024 44	Gillingham	3–0	Barrow	Gillingham
15:00 BST	Andrews 45+3'; Feely 55' (o.g.); Mahoney 64'	Report	Ray (red card) 22'	Stadium: Priestfield Stadium; Attendance: 5,796; Referee: Dean Whitestone

16 April 2024 36	Crawley Town	1–1	Barrow	Crawley
19:45 BST	Williams (yellow card) 9'; Orsi 64' (pen.); Kelly (yellow card) 88'	Report	Stephenson (yellow card) 12'; Acquah 36'; Chester (yellow card) 62'; Farman (yellow card) 63'	Stadium: Broadfield Stadium; Attendance: 3,155; Referee: Sam Purkiss
Note: Fixture was originally scheduled for 2 March, but was postponed due to a waterlogged pitch.

20 April 2024 45	Doncaster Rovers	4–2	Barrow	Doncaster
15:00 BST	Westbrooke (yellow card) 10'; Molyneux (yellow card) 53'; Ironside 58' (pen.), 90+9'; Adelakun 84'; Biggins 88'; Broadbent (yellow card) 90+7'	Report	Acquah 35'; Feely 45+1'; Newby (yellow card) 79'	Stadium: Eco-Power Stadium; Attendance: 10,251; Referee: Carl Brook

23 April 2024 35	Barrow	1–2	Bradford City	Barrow-in-Furness
19:45 BST	Stockton (yellow card) 32'; Spence 59'; Stephenson (yellow card) 66'; Farman (yellow card) 90+3'	Report	Pointon 29', (yellow card) 50'; Oyegoke (yellow card) 54'; Smith 90'; Chapman (yellow card) 90+3'	Stadium: Holker Street; Attendance: 4,527; Referee: Ross Joyce
Note: Fixture was originally scheduled for 24 February, but was postponed due to an unplayable surface, according to the match referee. Fixture was later postponed for a second time due to a waterlogged pitch.

27 April 2024 46	Barrow	1–1	Mansfield Town	Barrow-in-Furness
15:00 BST	Spence 58'	Report	Maris 16'	Stadium: Holker Street; Attendance: 5,668; Referee: Keith Stroud

=== FA Cup ===
Barrow were drawn away to Northampton Town in the first round.

Win Draw Loss Fixtures

4 November 2023 First round	Northampton Town	1–3	Barrow	Northampton
13:30 GMT	Pinnock 29' (yellow card) 85'; Hondermarck (yellow card) 45'; Hoskins (yellow card) 68'	Report	Acquah 9'; Ogungbo (yellow card) 21'; White 52'; Whitfield 72'	Stadium: Sixfields Stadium; Attendance: 3,187; Referee: Paul Howard

2 December 2023 Second round	Maidstone United	2–1	Barrow	Maidstone
15:00 GMT	Hoyte (yellow card) 34'; Corne 35'; Gurung 74'	Report	Whitfield 20'; Spence (yellow card) 57'; Foley (yellow card) 90+4'	Stadium: Gallagher Stadium; Attendance: 2,903; Referee: David Rock

=== EFL Cup ===
Barrow were drawn away to Bolton Wanderers in the first round.

Win Draw Loss Fixtures

8 August 2023 First round	Bolton Wanderers	1–0	Barrow	Horwich
19:45 BST	Thomason (yellow card) 32'; Ashworth 44'; Mendes Gomes (yellow card) 60'; Iredale (yellow card) 90+1'; Coleman (yellow card) 90+3'	Report	Ray (yellow card) 43'; Warren (yellow card) 47'; Feely (yellow card) 67'; Spence (yellow card) 71'	Stadium: Toughsheet Community Stadium; Attendance: 4,871; Referee: Anthony Backhouse

=== EFL Trophy ===
The Group stage draw was finalised on 22 June 2023.

Pos	Div	Team	Pld	W	PW	PL	L	GF	GA	GD	Pts	Qualification
1	L1	Blackpool	3	3	0	0	0	9	3	+6	9	Advance to Round 2
2	ACA	Liverpool U21	3	1	0	0	2	6	7	−1	3	Advance to Round 2
3	L2	Morecambe	3	1	0	0	2	4	6	−2	3	
4	L2	Barrow	3	1	0	0	2	3	6	−3	3	

Updated to match(es) played on 14 November 2023. Source: EFL.com

Win Draw Loss Fixtures

5 September 2023 Group stage	Barrow	0–2	Blackpool	Barrow-in-Furness
19:00 BST		Report	Tharme (yellow card) 35'; Carey 44'; Thompson (yellow card) 83'; Kouassi 85'	Stadium: Holker Street; Attendance: 1,436; Referee: Matthew Corlett

10 October 2023 Group stage	Morecambe	3–1	Barrow	Morecambe
19:00 BST	Brown (yellow card) 20' (goal) 38'; Rooney 58'; Smith 73'; Rawson (yellow card) 90+2'	Report	Spence (yellow card) 57'; Whitfield 68'; Duffus (yellow card) 90+2'	Stadium: Mazuma Stadium; Attendance: 2,203; Referee: Simon Mather

7 November 2023 Group stage	Barrow	2–1	Liverpool U21	Barrow-in-Furness
19:00 GMT	Foley (yellow card) 45+1'; Etoluku (yellow card) 53' (goal) 65'; Ogungbo 75'; White (yellow card) 85'	Report	Nallo (yellow card) 11'; Musiałowski 29'; Nyoni (yellow card) 56'; Morrison (yellow card) 66'	Stadium: Holker Street; Attendance: 1,463; Referee: Edward Duckworth
