= 2023–24 Morecambe F.C. season =

100th season in existence of Morecambe FC

Morecambe
2023–24 season
- Co-chairmen: Graham Howse & Rod Taylor
- Manager: Derek Adams (until 20 November); John McMahon and Ged Brannan (joint interim from 20 to 27 November); Ged Brannan (from 27 November)
- Stadium: Mazuma Mobile Stadium
- League Two: 15th
- FA Cup: Third Round
- EFL Cup: First Round
- EFL Trophy: Group Stage (3rd)
- Top goalscorer: League: Michael Mellon (13); All: Michael Mellon (15)
- Highest home attendance: 5,166 v Wrexham; 9 March 2024
- Lowest home attendance: 1,203 v Barrow; 10 October 2023
- Average home league attendance: 4,002
- Biggest win: Doncaster Rovers 0–5 Morecambe; 16 December 2023
- Biggest defeat: Wrexham 6–0 Morecambe; 25 November 2023
- All statistics correct as of match played 27 April 2024.

The 2023–24 season was Morecambe's 100th season since formation, their 17th consecutive season in the Football League, and their first season back in League Two, the fourth tier of English football. This followed relegation from League One during the previous season.

They also competed in the FA Cup, EFL Cup and EFL Trophy.

== Pre-season friendlies ==
On 2 June, Morecambe announced their pre-season preparations, with matches against Workington, Warrington Town, Southport, Burscough and Blackpool. A sixth was later added, against Wigan Athletic.

11 July 2023 Friendly	Workington	Cancelled	Morecambe	Workington
19:30 BST		Report		Stadium: Borough Park
Note: Match cancelled the day before due to Morecambe not being able to raise a team.

15 July 2023 Friendly	Warrington Town	2–0	Morecambe	Warrington
15:00 BST	Buckley 25'; Buckley-Ricketts 52'	Report		Stadium: Cantilever Park; Attendance: 573

18 July 2023 Friendly	Southport	1–3	Morecambe	Southport
19:30 BST	Hmami (yellow card) 37' (goal) 53'; Carver (yellow card) 59'; Heath, F. (yellow card) 64'	Report	Senior 34'; Mellon 38'; Stokes 55'; Rawson (yellow card) 88'	Stadium: Haig Avenue; Attendance: 623

22 July 2023 Friendly	Burscough	1–10	Morecambe	Burscough
15:00 BST	31'	Report	Mayor 3', 48'; Mellon 23', 42', 90'; McKiernan 29', 34'; Rawson 45'; Bloxham 83', 88'	Stadium: Community Ground

25 July 2023 Friendly	Morecambe	1–1	Blackpool	Morecambe
19:30 BST	Bloxham (yellow card) 12' (goal) 44'	Report	Thompson (yellow card) 43'; Lavery 56'	Stadium: Mazuma Stadium; Attendance: 2,265

29 July 2023 Friendly	Morecambe	0–2	Wigan Athletic	Morecambe
15:00 BST	Songo'o (yellow card) 39'	Report	Aasgaard 18'; Brennan 90+2'	Stadium: Mazuma Stadium; Attendance: 1,508

== Competitions ==
=== League Two ===
==== League table ====
Pos	Team	Pld	W	D	L	GF	GA	GD	Pts
12	Gillingham	46	18	10	18	46	57	−11	64
13	Harrogate Town	46	17	12	17	60	69	−9	63
14	Notts County	46	18	7	21	89	86	+3	61
15	Morecambe	46	17	10	19	67	81	−14	58 (Note: On 11 April 2024, Morecambe were deducted three points for failing to pay players and staff on time following previous EFL rules breaches in the 2023–24 season.)
16	Tranmere Rovers	46	17	6	23	67	70	−3	57
17	Accrington Stanley	46	16	9	21	63	71	−8	57
18	Newport County	46	16	7	23	62	76	−14	55

Source: EFL Official Website
Rules for classification: 1) Points; 2) Goal difference; 3) Number of goals scored; 4) Head-to-head results; 5) Wins; 6) Away goals; 7) Penalty points (sec 9.5); 8) 12-point sending off offences

==== Results summary ====
Overall								Home						Away					
Pld	W	D	L	GF	GA	GD	Pts	W	D	L	GF	GA	GD	W	D	L	GF	GA	GD
46	17	10	19	67	81	−14	61	8	7	8	29	29	0	9	3	11	38	52	−14

Last updated: 27 April 2024.
Source: Soccerway

==== Results by matchday ====
Matchday	1	2	3	4	5	6	7	8	9	10	11	12	13	14	15	16	17	18	19	20	21	22	23	24	25	26	27	28	29	30	31	32	33	34	35	36	37	38	39	40	41	42	43	44	45	46
Ground	H	A	H	H	A	H	A	H	A	H	A	A	H	H	A	A	A	H	H	A	H	A	A	H	H	A	H	A	H	A	A	A	H	A	H	H	A	A	H	A	H	H	H	A	H	A
Result	W	L	D	W	L	W	L	D	W	D	W	W	W	W	L	L	L	L	D	W	L	D	L	D	D	W	L	W	W	W	D	L	D	W	W	L	L	L	L	W	W	L	L	L	L	D
Position	6	14	14	7	11	9	16	14	12	12	10	10	8	6	6	7	12	12	12	8	12	13	16	17	16	13	15	12	12	11	10	11	10	9	8	10	11	12	12	10	8	10	12	15	16	15

Updated to match(es) played on 27 April 2024. Source: Soccerway
A = Away; H = Home; W = Win; D = Draw; L = Loss

==== Matches ====
On 22 June, the EFL League Two fixtures were released.

5 August 2023 1	Morecambe	2–1	Walsall	Morecambe
15:00 BST	Mayor 25'; Love (yellow card) 34'; Songo'o (yellow card) 38'; McKiernan (yellow card) 48'; Rawson 90+2' (yellow card) 90+3'; Bedeau (yellow card) 90+5'; Slew (yellow card) 90+11'	Report	Riley (yellow card) 37'; Johnson 38' (yellow card) 90+5'; McEntee (yellow card) 45+1'; Hutchinson (yellow card) 86'	Stadium: Mazuma Stadium; Attendance: 4,609; Referee: Martin Coy

12 August 2023 2	Mansfield Town	3–0	Morecambe	Mansfield
15:00 BST	Akins 45+1', 87' (pen.); Keillor-Dunn 62'; Cargill (yellow card) 63'; Lewis (yellow card) 70'	Report	McKiernan (yellow card) 45'; Love (yellow card) 45+1'	Stadium: Field Mill; Attendance: 6,695; Referee: Scott Simpson

15 August 2023 3	Morecambe	0–0	Notts County	Morecambe
19:45 BST	Mayor (yellow card) 37'	Report	Baldwin (yellow card) 36'	Stadium: Mazuma Stadium; Attendance: 3,860; Referee: Scott Jackson

19 August 2023 4	Morecambe	3–0	Bradford City	Morecambe
15:00 BST	Songo'o (yellow card) 12'; Mellon 22', 86' (pen.) (yellow card) 90+6'; Mayor (yellow card) 31'; McKiernan 68'	Report	Smallwood (yellow card) 22'; Pattison (yellow card) 25'; Stubbs (yellow card) 88'	Stadium: Mazuma Stadium; Attendance: 4,713; Referee: Lewis Smith

26 August 2023 5	Harrogate Town	2–0	Morecambe	Harrogate
15:00 BST	Armstrong 20' (pen.); Sutton (yellow card) 47'; Thomson 66'; Falkingham (yellow card) 82'; Oxley (yellow card) 83'	Report	Rawson (yellow card) 20' (yellow-red card) 64'; Bedeau (yellow card) 20'; Mayor (yellow card) 45+4'; Love (yellow card) 90+1'	Stadium: Wetherby Road; Attendance: 2,224; Referee: Ross Joyce

2 September 2023 6	Morecambe	1–0	Salford City	Morecambe
15:00 BST	Mellon 25'	Report	Lund (red card) 90+5'	Stadium: Mazuma Stadium; Attendance: 3,458; Referee: Will Finnie

16 September 2023 7	Gillingham	2–1	Morecambe	Gillingham
15:00 BST	Lapslie 9'; Mahoney 23'; J. Williams (yellow card) 36'; S. Williams (yellow card) 58'	Report	Mellin 11' (yellow card) 39' (yellow-red card) 76'; Connolly (yellow card) 52'; Love (yellow card) 76'; Tutonda (yellow card) 90+3'	Stadium: Priestfield Stadium; Attendance: 5,915; Referee: Declan Bourne

23 September 2023 8	Morecambe	2–2	Swindon Town	Morecambe
15:00 BST	Taylor 31'; Connolly (yellow card) 33'; Songo'o (yellow card) 54' (yellow-red card) 55'; Walker 80'	Report	Kemp 12' (yellow card) 90+6'; Austin 57' (pen.); Khan (yellow card) 78'	Stadium: Mazuma Stadium; Attendance: 3,737; Referee: Scott Tallis

30 September 2023 9	Forest Green Rovers	1–2	Morecambe	Nailsworth
15:00 BST	Inniss (yellow card) 12'; Brown (yellow card) 23'; Robson (yellow card) 45+1'; Omotoye 84'	Report	Love (yellow card) 5'; Mellon 26'; Slew 48'; Bedeau (yellow card) 90+4'	Stadium: The New Lawn; Attendance: 2,290; Referee: Adam Herczeg

3 October 2023 10	Morecambe	1–1	Accrington Stanley	Morecambe
19:45 BST	Bloxham (yellow card) 61'; Connolly 64'; Senior (yellow card) 72'; Bedeau (yellow card) 87'	Report	Andrews (yellow card) 61'; Hills (yellow card) 63'; Whalley (yellow card) 65'; Leigh 70' (pen.)	Stadium: Mazuma Stadium; Attendance: 3,458; Referee: Keith Stroud

7 October 2023 11	Colchester United	1–3	Morecambe	Colchester
15:00 BST	Mitchell (yellow card) 24'; McGeehan 73'; Chilvers (penalty missed) 90+2'; Ihionvien (yellow card) 90+5'	Report	Mayor (yellow card) 2'; Tutonda (yellow card) 8'; Love (yellow card) 16'; McKiernan 21', 53', 61'; Connolly (red card) 36'; Senior (yellow card) 90+3'	Stadium: Colchester Community Stadium; Attendance: 3,350; Referee: Sam Purkiss

21 October 2023 12	Sutton United	2–3	Morecambe	Sutton
15:00 BST	Coley (yellow card) 44'; Smith 45+4'; Goodliffe 62'	Report	Mellon 30' (pen.); Mayor 45+2'; Tutonda (yellow card) 72'; Senior 90+1'; Love (yellow card) 90+6'	Stadium: Gander Green Lane; Attendance: 2,603; Referee: Neil Hair

24 October 2023 13	Morecambe	1–0	Tranmere Rovers	Morecambe
19:45 BST	Bedeau (yellow card) 63'; Turnbull 72' (o.g.); Mayor (yellow card) 79'	Report	Hendry (yellow card) 45'; Jennings (yellow card) 45+4'	Stadium: Mazuma Stadium; Attendance: 3,678; Referee: Paul Howard

28 October 2023 14	Morecambe	4–1	AFC Wimbledon	Morecambe
15:00 BST	Mellon 46', 61' (pen.), 88'; Lewis 51' (o.g.); Davenport (yellow card) 65'; Tutonda (yellow card) 79'	Report	Bugiel (yellow card) 57'; Little 72'	Stadium: Mazuma Stadium; Attendance: 4,453; Referee: Edward Duckworth

31 October 2023 15	Barrow	1–0	Morecambe	Barrow-in-Furness
19:45 GMT	Telford 29'; Farman (yellow card) 90+2'	Report	Senior (yellow card) 26'	Stadium: Holker Street; Attendance: 4,007; Referee: Ben Speedie
Note: Fixture was previous postponed due to international call-ups.

11 November 2023 16	Grimsby Town	3–2	Morecambe	Cleethorpes
15:00 GMT	Khan (yellow card) 16'; Rose 47'; Green 49'; Pyke 59'; Holohan (yellow card) 74'; Hunt (yellow card) 90+5'	Report	Mayor 2'; Tutonda (yellow card) 44'; McKiernan 86'	Stadium: Blundell Park; Attendance: 5,939; Referee: Alan Young

25 November 2023 17	Wrexham	6–0	Morecambe	Wrexham
15:00 GMT	Senior 5' (o.g.); Mullin 7', 67', 77'; Cannon (yellow card) 19'; Mendy 35'; Jones 90+6'	Report	McKiernan (yellow card) 56'	Stadium: Racecourse Ground; Attendance: 10,224; Referee: Ben Atkinson

28 November 2023 18	Morecambe	1–2	Newport County	Morecambe
19:45 GMT	Mellon 12'; Mayor (yellow card) 90+6'	Report	Evans 28'; Palmer-Houlden 57'; Bennett (yellow card) 85'	Stadium: Mazuma Stadium; Attendance: 2,982; Referee: Ross Joyce

9 December 2023 19	Morecambe	1–1	Stockport County	Morecambe
15:00 GMT	Mellon 70'; Mayor (yellow card) 72'	Report	Wootton 87'	Stadium: Mazuma Stadium; Attendance: 4,505; Referee: John Busby

16 December 2023 20	Doncaster Rovers	0–5	Morecambe	Doncaster
15:00 GMT	Sterry (yellow card) 90+5'; Senior (yellow card) 90+5'	Report	King 7'; Tutonda (yellow card) 28' (goal) 80'; Mellon 34', 90+7'; Bedeau 51'; Connolly (yellow card) 76'; Mayor (yellow card) 90+3'	Stadium: The Eco-Power Stadium; Attendance: 6,260; Referee: Kirsty Dowle

23 December 2023 21	Morecambe	1–3	Milton Keynes Dons	Morecambe
15:00 GMT	Connolly (yellow card) 27'; McKiernan 49' (yellow card) 52'; Slew (yellow card) 90+6'	Report	Dean 31', 90+7'; Williams (yellow card) 41'; Tomlinson 69'	Stadium: Mazuma Stadium; Attendance: 4,551; Referee: Lewis Smith

26 December 2023 22	Bradford City	2–2	Morecambe	Bradford
15:00 GMT	Cook (yellow card) 56'; Oduor 59'; Tomkinson (yellow card) 80'; Halliday 83'	Report	Connolly 3'; Mckiernan 18', (yellow card) 58'; Slew (yellow card) 78'; Tutonda (yellow card) 80'	Stadium: Valley Parade; Attendance: 18,540; Referee: Darren Drysdale

29 December 2023 23	Notts County	5–0	Morecambe	Nottingham
19:45 GMT	Langstaff 10' (pen.), 13', 36'; Brindley (yellow card) 17'; Crowley 24'; Jones 46'	Report	Taylor (yellow card) 38'; Mckiernan (yellow card) 66'	Stadium: Meadow Lane; Attendance: 9,786; Referee: Bobby Madley

1 January 2024 24	Morecambe	2–2	Harrogate Town	Morecambe
15:00 GMT	Slew 57', (yellow card) 87'; Bedeau 90+2'; Songo'o (yellow card) 90+3'; Rawson (yellow card) 90+4'	Report	Muldoon 44'; Thomson 83'; Belshaw (yellow card) 90+3'; Burrell (yellow card) 90+4'	Stadium: Mazuma Stadium; Attendance: 3,776; Referee: Simon Mather

13 January 2024 25	Morecambe	1–1	Mansfield Town	Morecambe
15:00 GMT	Senior (yellow card) 60'; Mayor (yellow card) 72'; Brown 78' (yellow card) 89'	Report	Cargill 61'	Stadium: Mazuma Stadium; Attendance: 4,387; Referee: Seb Stockbridge

20 January 2024 26	Milton Keynes Dons	1–2	Morecambe	Milton Keynes
15:00 GMT	Dean 2', (yellow card) 10'; Tomlinson (yellow card) 21'	Report	Bedeau (yellow card) 35'; Slew 51'; Brown 90+2', (yellow card) 90+6'; Stokes (yellow card) 90+8'	Stadium: Stadium mk Attendance: 6,099; Referee: Marc Edwards

27 January 2024 27	Morecambe	0–1	Colchester United	Morecambe
15:00 GMT	Harrack (yellow card) 24'; Rawson (yellow card) 75'; Bedeau (yellow card) 90+7'	Report	Read 27'; Wilkinson (yellow card) 74'; Dallison (yellow card) 80'	Stadium: Mazuma Stadium; Attendance: 3,383; Referee: Daniel Middleton

3 February 2024 28	Crawley Town	1–2	Morecambe	Crawley
15:00 GMT	Forster 17'; Conroy (yellow card) 42'; Wright (yellow card) 78'	Report	Garner 35', 84'; Tutonda (yellow card) 80'; Harrack (yellow card) 90+4'	Stadium: Broadfield Stadium; Attendance: 2,856; Referee: Dean Whitestone

10 February 2024 29	Morecambe	1–0	Sutton United	Morecambe
15:00 GMT	Garner 4' (yellow card) 24'; Stokes (yellow card) 45+3'; Senior (yellow card) 65'; Edwards (yellow card) 90+3'	Report	Adom-Malaki (yellow card) 28'; Angol (yellow card) 45+3'; Jackson (yellow card) 72'; Hart (yellow card) 90+3'	Stadium: Mazuma Stadium; Attendance: 4,045; Referee: Peter Wright

13 February 2024 30	Tranmere Rovers	2–3	Morecambe	Birkenhead
19:45 GMT	Apter 4'; Jennings 10' (pen.); Hendry (yellow card) 27'; Morris (yellow card) 33'; Saunders (yellow card) 55'; Hawkes (yellow card) 75'; Lewis (yellow card) 90+4'	Report	Brown 14'; Adams (yellow card) 41'; Khumbeni (yellow card) 57'; Slew 82'; Davenport 90+5'	Stadium: Prenton Park; Attendance: 5,486; Referee: Ben Speedie

17 February 2024 31	AFC Wimbledon	1–1	Morecambe	Wimbledon
15:00 GMT	Bugiel 50'; Tilley (yellow card) 62'	Report	Khumbeni (yellow card) 11'; Taylor (yellow card) 42'; Tutonda (yellow card) 66'; Stokes 74'; Davenport (yellow card) 86'; Melbourne (yellow card) 90+2'	Stadium: The Cherry Red Records Stadium; Attendance: 7,715; Referee: Martin Woods

20 February 2024 32	Walsall	3–0	Morecambe	Bescot
19:45 GMT	Tierney 13'; Comley (yellow card) 23'; Matt 26'; Gordon (yellow card) 58'; Knowles (yellow card) 62'; Adegboyega 65'; Earing (yellow card) 90+1'	Report	Stokes (yellow card) 53'; Tutonda (yellow card) 80'	Stadium: Bescot Stadium; Attendance: 4,543; Referee: Carl Brook

24 February 2024 33	Morecambe	1–1	Grimsby Town	Morecambe
15:00 GMT	Slew 53'; Khumbeni (yellow card) 85'	Report	Rose 2'; Holohan (yellow card) 85'	Stadium: Mazuma Stadium; Attendance: 3,794; Referee: Will Finnie

2 March 2024 34	Crewe Alexandra	2–3	Morecambe	Crewe
15:00 GMT	Nevitt 18'; Adebisi (yellow card) 25'; Tracey 49'; Demetriou (yellow card) 58'	Report	Stokes (yellow card) 58'; Senior (yellow card) 68'; Adams 69'; Hiwula (yellow card) 72'; Slew 74'; Rawson 83'	Stadium: Mornflake Stadium; Attendance: 4,995; Referee: Farai Hallam

5 March 2024 35	Morecambe	1–0	Crawley Town	Morecambe
19:45 GMT	Brown (yellow card) 8'; Khumbeni (yellow card) 45+1'; Songo'o (yellow card) 48'; Slew 68'; Hiwula (yellow card) 90+2'	Report	Wright (yellow card) 10'; Williams (yellow card) 28'; Darcy (yellow card) 73'; Orsi (yellow card) 90+4'	Stadium: Mazuma Mobile Stadium; Attendance: 2,997; Referee: Matthew Corlett

9 March 2024 36	Morecambe	1–3	Wrexham	Morecambe
15:00 BST	Garner 4'; Melbourne (yellow card) 39' (yellow-red card) 49'; Songo'o (yellow card) 42'; Edwards (yellow card) 63'	Report	McClean; Mullin 55' (pen.); Fletcher 80' (McClean); Barnett (yellow card) 90+6'	Stadium: Mazuma Mobile Stadium; Attendance: 5,166; Referee: Thomas Parsons

12 March 2024 37	Newport County	5–3	Morecambe	Newport
19:45 GMT	Wildig 12', 54'; Lewis 18'; Charsley 78'; Palmer-Houlden 90+7'	Report	Edwards 31', 74'; Stokes 70'	Stadium: Rodney Parade; Attendance: 3,508; Referee: Scott Simpson

17 March 2024 38	Salford City	3–1	Morecambe	Kersal
14:00 GMT	McLennan 13', (yellow card) 86'; Hendry 50'; Tilt 79'	Report	Garner (yellow card) 34'; Vassell 61' (o.g.)	Stadium: Moor Lane; Attendance: 2,927; Referee: Sam Purkiss

23 March 2024 39	Morecambe	2–3	Gillingham	Morecambe
15:00 BST	Slew 11', (yellow card) 74'; Brown (yellow card) 23', (goal) 64'; Adams (yellow card) 61'; Khumbeni (yellow card) 90+2'	Report	Hawkins 18'; Dieng 73', (yellow card) 90+5'; Malone (yellow card) 83'; Mahoney 86'	Stadium: Mazuma Stadium; Attendance: 3,408; Referee: Paul Howard

29 March 2024 40	Accrington Stanley	1–2	Morecambe	Accrington
15:00 GMT	Gubbins (yellow card) 60'; Leigh (yellow card) 72'; Shipley 89', (yellow card) 89'; O'Brien (yellow card) 90+9'	Report	Khumbeni (yellow card) 47', (goal) 55'; Stokes 62'; Tutonda (yellow card) 90+4'	Stadium: Crown Ground; Attendance: 3,420; Referee: Alex Chilowicz

1 April 2024 41	Morecambe	2–1	Barrow	Morecambe
15:00 GMT	Tutonda 3' (yellow card) 80'; Edwards 11'; Stokes (yellow card) 48'	Report	Campbell (yellow card) 31'; Ray (yellow card) 65'; Whitfield 89'	Stadium: Mazuma Stadium; Attendance: 4,878; Referee: Marc Edwards

6 April 2024 42	Morecambe	0–3	Doncaster Rovers	Morecambe
15:00 BST	Edwards (yellow card) 39'; Taylor (yellow card) 55'	Report	Molyneux 12', 23'; Adelakun (yellow card) 68'; Craig (yellow card) 76'; Sterry (yellow card) 88'; Rowe 90+1'	Stadium: Mazuma Stadium; Attendance: 4,146; Referee: Darren Drysdale

9 April 2024 43	Morecambe	0–1	Crewe Alexandra	Morecambe
19:45 BST	Songo'o (yellow card) 90+5'	Report	Nevitt 70'; Leigh (red card) 89'	Stadium: Mazuma Stadium; Attendance: 3,564; Referee: Scott Oldham

13 April 2024 44	Stockport County	2–0	Morecambe	Stockport
15:00 BST	Olaofe 8'; Camps (yellow card) 40'; Horsfall 45+4'	Report	Edwards (yellow card) 31'; Bedeau (yellow card) 45+6'; Brown (yellow card) 69'	Stadium: Edgeley Park; Attendance: 10,148; Referee: Lee Swabey

20 April 2024 45	Morecambe	1–2	Forest Green Rovers	Morecambe
15:00 BST	Brown 30'; Rawson (yellow card) 68'	Report	Dabo (yellow card) 17'; McCann 38'; McAllister 44', (yellow card) 82'; Bernard (yellow card) 89'	Stadium: Mazuma Mobile Stadium; Attendance: 4,491; Referee: Ross Joyce

27 April 2024 46	Swindon Town	3–3	Morecambe	Swindon
15:00 BST	Austin 5', 35'; McCarthy (yellow card) 46'; Kokolo 74'	Report	Adams 15'; Fairclough 21'; Smith 86'	Stadium: The County Ground; Attendance: 8,859; Referee: Craig Hicks

=== FA Cup ===
Morecambe were drawn away to Lincoln City in the first round, Wycombe Wanderers in the second round and Swansea City in the third round.

4 November 2023 First Round	Lincoln City	1–2	Morecambe	Lincoln
15:00 GMT	Sørensen 14' (yellow card) 57'; Eyoma (yellow card) 20'; Hamilton (yellow card) 66'	Report	King (yellow card) 21'; Tutonda (yellow card) 22'; Mellon 43'; Bloxham 53'; Senior (yellow card) 62'; McKiernan (yellow card) 66'	Stadium: Sincil Bank; Attendance: 4,607; Referee: Martin Coy

2 December 2023 Second Round	Wycombe Wanderers	0–2	Morecambe	High Wycombe
15:00 GMT	Phillips (yellow card) 88'	Report	King 38'; Bloxham 56'; Mayor (yellow card) 74'; Smith (yellow card) 90+5'	Stadium: Adams Park; Attendance: 1,604; Referee: Peter Wright

6 January 2024 Third Round	Swansea City	2–0	Morecambe	Landore
17:30 GMT	Patino 47'; Wood (yellow card) 77'; Yates 87'	Report	Mayor (yellow card) 85'; Edwards (yellow card) 89'	Stadium: Swansea.com Stadium; Attendance: 7,670; Referee: Tom Nield

=== EFL Cup ===
The Shrimps were drawn away to Rotherham United in the first round.

8 August 2023 First Round	Rotherham United	1–1 (4–2 p)	Morecambe	Rotherham
19:45 BST	Kayode 37'; Onyedinma (yellow card) 89'	Report	Mellon 22'; Moore (yellow card) 59'	Stadium: New York Stadium; Attendance: 2,834; Referee: Thomas Parsons
	Penalties
	Hugill (penalty scored); Rathbone (penalty scored); Blackett (penalty scored); Onyedinma (penalty scored)		(penalty scored) McKiernan; (penalty scored) Davenport; (penalty missed) Brown; (penalty missed) Taylor
Note: Morecambe went first in the shootout.

=== EFL Trophy ===
In the group stage, Morecambe were drawn into Northern Group A alongside Barrow, Blackpool and Liverpool U21.

Pos	Div	Team	Pld	W	PW	PL	L	GF	GA	GD	Pts	Qualification
1	L1	Blackpool	3	3	0	0	0	9	3	+6	9	Advance to Round 2
2	ACA	Liverpool U21	3	1	0	0	2	6	7	−1	3	Advance to Round 2
3	L2	Morecambe	3	1	0	0	2	4	6	−2	3	
4	L2	Barrow	3	1	0	0	2	3	6	−3	3	

Updated to match(es) played on 14 November 2023. Source: EFL.com

19 September 2023 Group Stage	Morecambe	0–3	Liverpool U21	Morecambe
19:00 BST	Brown (yellow card) 34'; Mellon (yellow card) 90+4'	Report	Musiałowski 13'; Frauendorf (yellow card) 28'; Scanlon 28'; Clark 39'; Pitaluga (yellow card) 62'; Davidson (yellow card) 80'	Stadium: Mazuma Stadium; Attendance: 1,607; Referee: Ollie Yates

10 October 2023 Group Stage	Morecambe	3–1	Barrow	Morecambe
19:00 BST	Brown (yellow card) 20' (goal) 38'; Rooney 58'; Smith 73'; Rawson (yellow card) 90+2'	Report	Spence (yellow card) 57'; Whitfield 68'; Duffus (yellow card) 90+2'	Stadium: Mazuma Stadium; Attendance: 2,203; Referee: Simon Mather

14 November 2023 Group Stage	Blackpool	2–1	Morecambe	Blackpool
19:00 GMT	Beesley 21', 46'; Miles (yellow card) 41'; Mariette (yellow card) 45'	Report	Slew (yellow card) 50'; Rawson 90+2'	Stadium: Bloomfield Road; Attendance: 1,829; Referee: Martin Woods

== Transfers ==
=== In ===
Date	Pos	Player	Transferred from	Fee	Ref
1 July 2023	CF	(England) Charlie Brown	(England) Cheltenham Town	Free Transfer	
1 July 2023	CM	(Northern Ireland) JJ McKiernan	(England) Watford	Free Transfer	
1 July 2023	GK	(England) Stuart Moore	(England) Blackpool	Free Transfer	
1 July 2023	RB	(England) Joel Senior	(England) Carlisle United	Free Transfer	
1 July 2023	CF	(Scotland) Cammy Smith	(Scotland) Partick Thistle	Free Transfer	
1 July 2023	DM	(Cameroon) Yann Songo'o	(England) Bradford City	Free Transfer	
1 July 2023	CB	(England) Chris Stokes	(Scotland) Kilmarnock	Free Transfer	
7 July 2023	CF	(England) Jordan Slew	(England) FC Halifax Town	Free Transfer	
20 July 2023	DM	(England) Jacob Davenport	(England) Stockport County	Free Transfer	
11 August 2023	LB	(Democratic Republic of the Congo) David Tutonda	(England) Gillingham	Free Transfer	
23 November 2023	RB	(England) Oscar Threlkeld	Free agent	—N/a	
3 January 2024	RW	(Wales) Gwion Edwards	Free agent	—N/a	
18 January 2024	LW	(England) Brandon Barker	Free agent	—N/a	
18 January 2024	CB	(Grenada) Kayden Harrack	(England) Queens Park Rangers	Free Transfer	
22 February 2024	CF	(England) Jordy Hiwula	Free agent	—N/a	

=== Out ===
Date	Pos	Player	Transferred to	Fee	Ref
30 June 2023	RB	(England) Ryan Cooney	(England) Crewe Alexandra	Released	
30 June 2023	AM	(England) Daniel Crowley	(England) Notts County	Released	
30 June 2023	CB	(Republic of Ireland) Ryan Delaney	(Wales) Newport County	Released	
30 June 2023	CF	(Republic of Ireland) Courtney Duffus	(England) Barrow	Released	
30 June 2023	LB	(England) Liam Gibson	(England) Harrogate Town	Released	
30 June 2023	LW	(France) Arthur Gnahoua	(England) Grimsby Town	Released	
30 June 2023	LW	(England) Ashley Hunter	(England) Milton Keynes Dons	Released	
30 June 2023	GK	(Portugal) Andre Da Silva Mendes	(England) Lancaster City	Released	
30 June 2023	CF	(Senegal) Oumar Niasse	(England) Macclesfield	Released	
30 June 2023	CF	(England) Jonathan Obika	(Scotland) Motherwell	Released	
30 June 2023	GK	(England) Connor Ripley	(England) Port Vale	Released	
30 June 2023	LB	(Senegal) Pape Souaré	(Scotland) Motherwell	Released	
30 June 2023	CF	(England) Cole Stockton	(England) Burton Albion	Released	
31 January 2024	LW	(England) Adam Mayor	(England) Millwall	Undisclosed	

=== Loaned in ===
Date	Pos	Player	Loaned from	Date until	Ref
11 July 2023	CF	(Scotland) Michael Mellon	(England) Burnley	8 January 2024 (Note: On 8 January, Mellon was recalled back to Burnley early from his season-long loan.)	
20 July 2023	CF	(England) Tom Bloxham	(England) Shrewsbury Town	9 January 2024 (Note: On 9 January, Bloxham was recalled back to Shrewsbury early from his season-long loan.)	
28 July 2023	DM	(Wales) Eli King	(Wales) Cardiff City	8 January 2024 (Note: On 8 January, King was recalled back to Cardiff early from his season-long loan.)	
31 August 2023	CB	(Wales) James Connolly	(England) Bristol Rovers	3 January 2024 (Note: On 3 January, Connolly was recalled back to Bristol Rovers early due to injuries within the Bristol squad.)	
1 September 2023	LW	(England) Ethan Walker	(England) Blackburn Rovers	2 January 2024 (Note: On 2 January, Walker was recalled back to Blackburn early.)	
5 January 2024	GK	(Scotland) Archie Mair	(England) Norwich City	End of Season	
11 January 2024	AM	(England) Joe Adams	(England) Wigan Athletic	End of Season	
16 January 2024	CF	(England) Gerard Garner	(England) Barrow	End of Season	
1 February 2024	DM	(Malawi) Nelson Khumbeni	(England) Bolton Wanderers	End of Season	
1 February 2024	CF	(Sweden) Julian Larsson	(England) Nottingham Forest	End of Season	

=== Loaned out ===
Date	Pos	Player	Loaned to	Date Until	Ref
12 October 2023	CM	(England) Cameron Rooney	(England) Nantwich Town	11 November 2023	
15 December 2023	CM	(England) Cameron Rooney	(England) Runcorn Linnets	11 January 2024	
17 January 2024	CM	(England) Cameron Rooney	(England) Lower Breck	15 February 2024	
30 January 2024	CB	(England) Leyton Holden	(England) Kendal Town	29 February 2024	
30 January 2024	CF	(England) Matthew Williams	(England) Kendal Town	29 February 2024	
