= Tom White (footballer, born 1997) =

English footballer

Personal information
- Full name: Thomas Alan White
- Date of birth: 9 May 1997 (age 29)
- Place of birth: Newcastle upon Tyne, England
- Height: 1.78 m (5 ft 10 in)
- Position: Midfielder

Team information
- Current team: Boreham Wood
- Number: 4

Youth career
- Carlisle United
- 2015–2017: Gateshead

Senior career*
Years	Team	Apps	(Gls)
2017–2019	Gateshead	44	(3)
2017	→ Spennymoor Town (loan)		
2017	→ West Auckland Town (loan)		
2017	→ Ashington (loan)		
2018	→ Scarborough Athletic (loan)		
2019–2021	Blackburn Rovers	0	(0)
2019–2020	→ Barrow (loan)	18	(2)
2020–2021	→ Bolton Wanderers (loan)	9	(0)
2021	→ Hartlepool United (loan)	10	(0)
2021–2024	Barrow	101	(0)
2024–2025	Morecambe	34	(0)
2025–	Boreham Wood	26	(1)

International career
2019	England C	2	(0)
- * Club domestic league appearances and goals as of 17:50, 22 March 2026 (UTC)

Thomas Alan White (born 9 May 1997) is an English professional footballer who plays as a midfielder for National League club Boreham Wood.

== Club career ==
=== Gateshead ===
After playing for a boys clubs with future Blackburn teammate Adam Armstrong and youth football for Carlisle United, he signed for Gateshead at the age of 18. His time with Gateshead was hindered by injury, and in 2016 the club initially withdrew their offer of a professional contract due to his injuries. He remained with the club to use their training facilities as he recovered, and he also spent loan spells at Spennymoor Town (signing for them in January 2017), West Auckland Town (signing for them in September 2017), Ashington (signing for them in November 2017) and Scarborough Athletic (signing for them in January 2018). During this time he relied on borrowing money from his parents for petrol so he could get to training. The 2018–19 season was a "breakthrough" for him at the club as he made 43 league appearances for them that season.

=== Blackburn Rovers ===
He signed a two-year contract with Blackburn Rovers in July 2019. At Blackburn he initially played with the under-23 team, before moving on loan to Barrow in November 2019. In January 2020 he extended the loan until the end of the season, and later that month recovered from a chest infection. The loan deal had ended by 22 April 2020.

On 28 July 2020 he moved on loan to Bolton Wanderers for the 2019–20 season. His debut came on 5 September in Bolton's first match of the season, a 1–2 home defeat against Bradford in the first round of the EFL Cup. His league debut came on 12 September in Bolton's first league match of the season, a 1–0 home defeat against Forest Green Rovers. On 2 February 2021, his loan spell came to an end and he returned to Blackburn. On 5 February 2021, White signed for National League side Hartlepool United on a short-term loan deal. The loan was then extended until 15 May 2021.

=== Barrow ===
On 14 May 2021 it was announced that White would leave Blackburn at the end of the season, following the expiry of his contract. On 8 June 2021 it was announced that he would re-sign for Barrow on a permanent contract after that time.

=== Morecambe ===
White signed for Morecambe in July 2024. On 4 August 2025, White announced on X, formerly Twitter, that he was leaving Morecambe due to the club's financial difficulties.

=== Boreham Wood ===
On 5 August 2025, White joined Boreham Wood.

== International career ==
White earned two caps with England C during the 2018–19 season.

== Career statistics ==
As of match played 3 May 2025

Appearances and goals by club, season and competition
Club	Season	League			FA Cup		League Cup		Other		Total	
Club	Season	Division	Apps	Goals	Apps	Goals	Apps	Goals	Apps	Goals	Apps	Goals
Gateshead	2016–17	National League	1	0	0	0	—		0	0	1	0
Gateshead	2017–18	National League	0	0	0	0	—		0	0	0	0
Gateshead	2018–19	National League	43	3	2	0	—		1 (Note: Appearance(s) in FA Trophy)	0	46	3
Gateshead	Total		44	3	2	0	0	0	1	0	47	3
Blackburn Rovers	2019–20	Championship	0	0	0	0	0	0	—		0	0
Blackburn Rovers	2020–21	Championship	0	0	0	0	0	0	—		0	0
Blackburn Rovers	Total		0	0	0	0	0	0	0	0	0	0
Barrow (loan)	2019–20	National League	18	2	0	0	—		3	0	21	2
Bolton Wanderers (loan)	2020–21	League Two	9	0	1	0	1	0	3 (Note: Appearances in EFL Trophy)	0	14	0
Hartlepool United (loan)	2020–21	National League	10	0	0	0	—		0	0	10	0
Barrow	2021–22	League Two	27	0	4	0	2	0	3	0	37	0
Barrow	2022–23	League Two	43	0	1	0	2	0	4	0	49	0
Barrow	2023–24	League Two	31	0	2	1	1	0	2	0	36	1
Barrow	Total		101	0	7	1	5	0	9	0	122	1
Morecambe	2024–25	League Two	34	0	3	0	1	0	2	0	40	0
Boreham Wood	2025–26	National League	0	0	0	0	0	0	0	0	0	0
Career total			216	5	13	1	7	0	18	0	254	6

== Honours ==
Barrow

- National League: 2019–20
