= Sean Etaluku =

English footballer

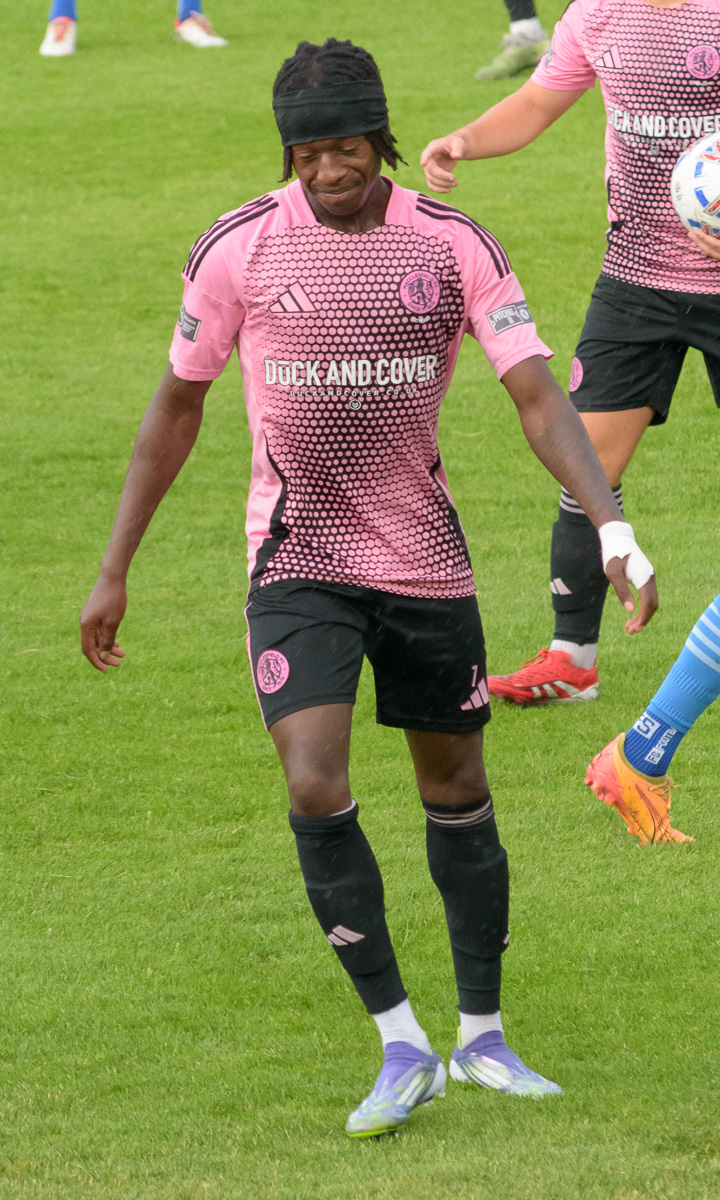
- Etaluku playing for Macclesfield in 2025

Personal information
- Full name: Sean Kesena Temitope Etaluku
- Date of birth: 5 December 2003 (age 22)
- Place of birth: Redbridge, England
- Position: Winger

Team information
- Current team: Forest Green Rovers
- Number: 20

Youth career
- 2013–2022: Burnley

Senior career*
Years	Team	Apps	(Gls)
2022–2023	Mossley	13	(0)
2023–2024	Barrow	1	(0)
2024	→ Buxton (loan)	4	(0)
2024	→ Matlock Town (loan)	6	(0)
2024–2025	Macclesfield	36	(4)
2025–	Forest Green Rovers	0	(0)
- * Club domestic league appearances and goals as of 14:27, 23 October 2025 (UTC)

Sean Kesena Temitope Etaluku (born 5 December 2003) is an English footballer who plays as a winger for National League side Forest Green Rovers.

== Career ==
Having spent nine years in the youth system of Burnley, Etaluku joined Northern Premier League Division One West club Mossley in November 2022 following his release.

Following a successful trial period with the club, Etaluku joined League Two club Barrow in July 2023. On 19 August 2023, he made his league debut for the club as a substitute in a 1–0 defeat to Stockport County. In March 2024, he joined National League North side Buxton on loan until the end of the season.

In September 2024, Etaluku joined Northern Premier League Premier Division side Matlock Town. The following month, he was recalled to allow him to join Macclesfield permanently for an undisclosed fee. Following promotion, Etaluku was named Northern Premier League Premier Division Young Player of the Season.

In October 2025, Sean Etaluku signed for National League side Forest Green Rovers, reuniting with former manager Robbie Savage for an undisclosed fee from National League North side Macclesfield FC.

== Career statistics ==
As of match played 4 October 2025

Appearances and goals by club, season and competition
Club	Season	League			FA Cup		League Cup		Other		Total	
Club	Season	Division	Apps	Goals	Apps	Goals	Apps	Goals	Apps	Goals	Apps	Goals
Mossley	2022–23	NPL Division One West	13	0	0	0	—		0	0	13	0
Barrow	2023–24	League Two	1	0	0	0	0	0	3 (Note: Appearance(s) in EFL Trophy)	1	4	1
Barrow	2024–25	League Two	0	0	0	0	0	0	1	0	1	0
Barrow	Total		1	0	0	0	0	0	4	1	5	1
Buxton (loan)	2023–24	National League North	4	0	—		—		0	0	4	0
Matlock Town (loan)	2024–25	NPL Premier Division	6	0	0	0	—		1 (Note: Appearance(s) in FA Trophy)	0	7	0
Macclesfield	2024–25	NPL Premier Division	26	3	0	0	—		0	0	26	3
Macclesfield	2025–26	National League North	10	1	2	1	—		0	0	12	2
Macclesfield	Total		36	4	2	1	0	0	0	0	38	5
Career total			60	4	2	1	0	0	5	1	67	6

== Honours ==
Macclesfield

- Northern Premier League Premier Division: 2024–25

Individual

- Northern Premier League Premier Division Young Player of the Year: 2024–25
