= Mazeed Ogungbo =

Irish footballer (born 2002)

Personal information
- Full name: Mazeed Omotayo Ogungbo
- Date of birth: 20 October 2002 (age 24)
- Position: Defender

Youth career
- 2015–2022: Arsenal

Senior career*
Years	Team	Apps	(Gls)
2022–2023	Arsenal	0	(0)
2022–2023	→ Crawley Town (loan)	23	(1)
2023–2025	Barrow	9	(0)
2025	→ Hemel Hempstead Town (loan)	21	(3)
2025	Eastbourne Borough	2	(0)

International career
2018	Republic of Ireland U16	2	(0)
2019	Republic of Ireland U19	4	(0)
- * Club domestic league appearances and goals as of 13:08, 19 November 2025 (UTC)

Mazeed Omotayo Ogungbo (born 20 October 2002) is an Irish professional footballer who plays as a defender.

== Club career ==
Ogungbo began his career with Arsenal, joining their academy at the age of 13, and turning professional in August 2021.

He joined Crawley Town on a season-long loan in August 2022.

On 28 June 2023, Ogungbo joined EFL League Two club Barrow for an undisclosed fee, signing a two-year contract.

In January 2025, Ogungbo joined National League South side Hemel Hempstead Town on loan for the remainder of the season.

On 7 May 2025, Barrow announced the player would be leaving in June when his contract expired.

On 2 September 2025, Ogungbo joined National League South club Eastbourne Borough. He departed the club in November 2025.

== International career ==
Ogungbo is an Irish youth international. He is also eligible to play for Nigeria.

== Career statistics ==
As of match played 2 September 2025

Appearances and goals by club, season and competition
Club	Season	League			FA Cup		EFL Cup		Other		Total	
Club	Season	Division	Apps	Goals	Apps	Goals	Apps	Goals	Apps	Goals	Apps	Goals
Arsenal	2019–20	Premier League	0	0	0	0	0	0	1 (Note: Appearance(s) in EFL Trophy)	0	1	0
Arsenal	2020–21	Premier League	0	0	0	0	0	0	0	0	0	0
Arsenal	2021–22	Premier League	0	0	0	0	0	0	5	0	5	0
Arsenal	2022–23	Premier League	0	0	0	0	0	0	0	0	0	0
Arsenal	Total		0	0	0	0	0	0	6	0	6	0
Crawley Town (loan)	2022–23	League Two	23	1	0	0	2	0	2	0	27	1
Barrow	2023–24	League Two	8	0	1	0	0	0	2	1	11	1
Barrow	2024–25	League Two	1	0	0	0	0	0	1	0	2	0
Barrow	Total		9	0	1	0	0	0	3	1	13	1
Hemel Hempstead Town (loan)	2024–25	National League South	21	3	0	0	0	0	0	0	21	3
Eastbourne Borough	2025–26	National League South	1	0	0	0	0	0	0	0	1	0
Career total			54	4	1	0	2	0	11	1	68	5
