= Adam Mayor =

English footballer (born 2006)

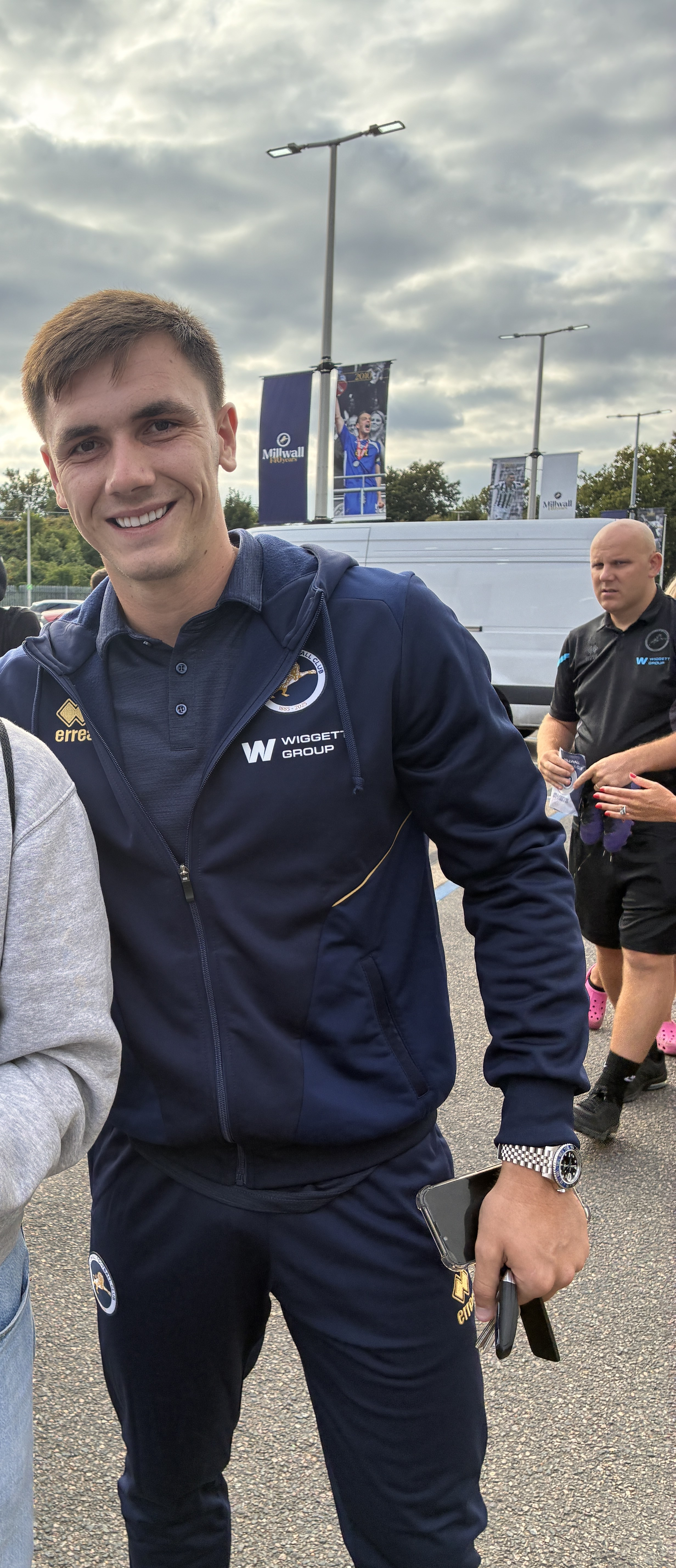
- Adam Mayor in 2025.

Personal information
- Full name: Adam Matthew Mayor
- Date of birth: 10 April 2004 (age 22)
- Place of birth: Liverpool, England
- Height: 1.78 m (5 ft 10 in)
- Position: Wing-back

Team information
- Current team: Hibernian
- Number: 3

Youth career
- Preston North End
- –2022: Morecambe

Senior career*
Years	Team	Apps	(Gls)
2022–2024	Morecambe	57	(6)
2024–2026	Millwall	4	(0)
2025	→ Bromley (loan)	17	(0)
2025–2026	→ Cambridge United (loan)	27	(2)
2026–	Hibernian	0	(0)
- * Club domestic league appearances and goals as of 15:40, 6 May 2026 (UTC)

Adam Matthew Mayor (born 10 April 2004) is an English professional footballer who plays as a left-sided wing-back for Scottish Premiership club Hibernian.

== Career ==
Born in Liverpool, Mayor was signed to Tranmere rovers at the age of 8 after being spotted playing for his local team Frameline Juniors. After being released Mayor spent time with Preston North End before joining Morecambe. He made his first-team debut on 27 August 2022, coming on as an 89th-minute substitute for Arthur Gnahoua in a 4–0 defeat to Milton Keynes Dons at the Globe Arena. Three days later, he played in an EFL Trophy group stage game with Everton U23, where he converted his penalty kick in the 7–6 shoot-out victory following a 3–3 draw. He scored his first career goal in the competition on 18 October, in a 2–1 defeat at Harrogate Town; Mayor said that "the ball came across and it happened quickly, I think Arthur [Gnahoua] missed the ball and then it just bounced to me perfectly to hit it first time". His first goal in EFL League One came on 29 October, in a 1–1 draw at Wycombe Wanderers.

=== Millwall ===
On 31 January 2024, Mayor signed for Championship club Millwall on a long-term contract for an undisclosed fee, mooted to be £300,000, potentially rising to £1 million.

On 31 January 2025, Mayor returned to League Two, joining Bromley on loan for the remainder of the season.

=== Hibernian ===
Mayor joined Hibernian on a permanent transfer from Millwall on 14 July 2026 for an undisclosed fee.

== Career statistics ==
As of match played 2 May 2026

Appearances and goals by club, season and competition
Club	Season	League			FA Cup		EFL Cup		Other		Total	
Club	Season	Division	Apps	Goals	Apps	Goals	Apps	Goals	Apps	Goals	Apps	Goals
Morecambe	2022–23	League One	34	3	0	0	1	0	4 (Note: Appearances in EFL Trophy)	1	39	4
Morecambe	2023–24	League Two	23	3	3	0	0	0	2	0	28	3
Morecambe	Total		57	6	3	0	1	0	6	1	67	7
Millwall	2023–24	Championship	4	0	0	0	0	0	—		4	0
Millwall	2024–25	Championship	0	0	1	0	0	0	–		1	0
Millwall	Total		4	0	1	0	0	0	0	0	5	0
Bromley (loan)	2024-25	League Two	17	0	0	0	0	0	0	0	17	0
Cambridge United (loan)	2025-26	League Two	27	2	2	0	1	0	4	1	34	3
Career total			105	8	6	0	2	0	10	2	123	10
