= Cameron Rooney =

English footballer (born 2004)

Personal information
- Date of birth: 28 December 2004 (age 21)
- Position: Midfielder

Youth career
- –2023: Morecambe

Senior career*
Years	Team	Apps	(Gls)
2023–2024	Morecambe	1	(1)
2023	→ Runcorn Linnets (loan)	11	(2)
2023	→ Nantwich Town (loan)	4	(0)
2023–2024	→ Runcorn Linnets (loan)	2	(0)
2024	→ Lower Breck (loan)	3	(0)
- * Club domestic league appearances and goals as of 12:23, 2 May 2024 (UTC)

Cameron Rooney is an English footballer who plays as a midfielder.

== Career ==
Rooney joined Morecambe having previously represented Liverpool Schoolboys at under-13s level. Although originally a striker, he dropped deeper into a midfield position. Toward the end of the 2022–23 season, he joined Runcorn Linnets on loan, helping the club reach the play-off final.

Following relegation back to League Two, Rooney became more heavily involved in the first-team picture ahead of the 2023–24 season. On 10 October 2023, Rooney made his professional debut for Morecambe, scoring in a 3–1 EFL Trophy victory over Barrow. He joined Nantwich Town on a one-month youth loan later in that same week. In December 2023, he returned to Runcorn Linnets on a further one-month loan deal, joining North West Counties Football League Premier Division club Lower Breck upon his return to Morecambe on a work-experience loan deal.

== Career statistics ==
As of end of 2023–24 season

Appearances and goals by club, season and competition
Club	Season	League			FA Cup		League Cup		Other		Total	
Club	Season	Division	Apps	Goals	Apps	Goals	Apps	Goals	Apps	Goals	Apps	Goals
Morecambe	2022–23	League One	0	0	0	0	0	0	0	0	0	0
Morecambe	2023–24	League Two	1	0	0	0	0	0	1 (Note: Appearance(s) in EFL Trophy)	1	2	1
Morecambe	Total		1	0	0	0	0	0	1	1	2	1
Runcorn Linnets (loan)	2022–23	NPL Division One West	9	2	—		—		5 (Note: Two appearances in Liverpool Senior Cup, one appearance in Cheshire Senior Cup, two appearances in NPL Division One West play-offs)	0	14	2
Nantwich Town (loan)	2023–24	NPL Division One West	4	0	0	0	—		1 (Note: Appearance(s) in FA Trophy)	0	5	0
Runcorn Linnets (loan)	2023–24	NPL Division One West	2	0	0	0	—		0	0	2	0
Career total			16	2	0	0	0	0	7	1	23	3
