= Courtney Duffus =

Footballer (born 1995)

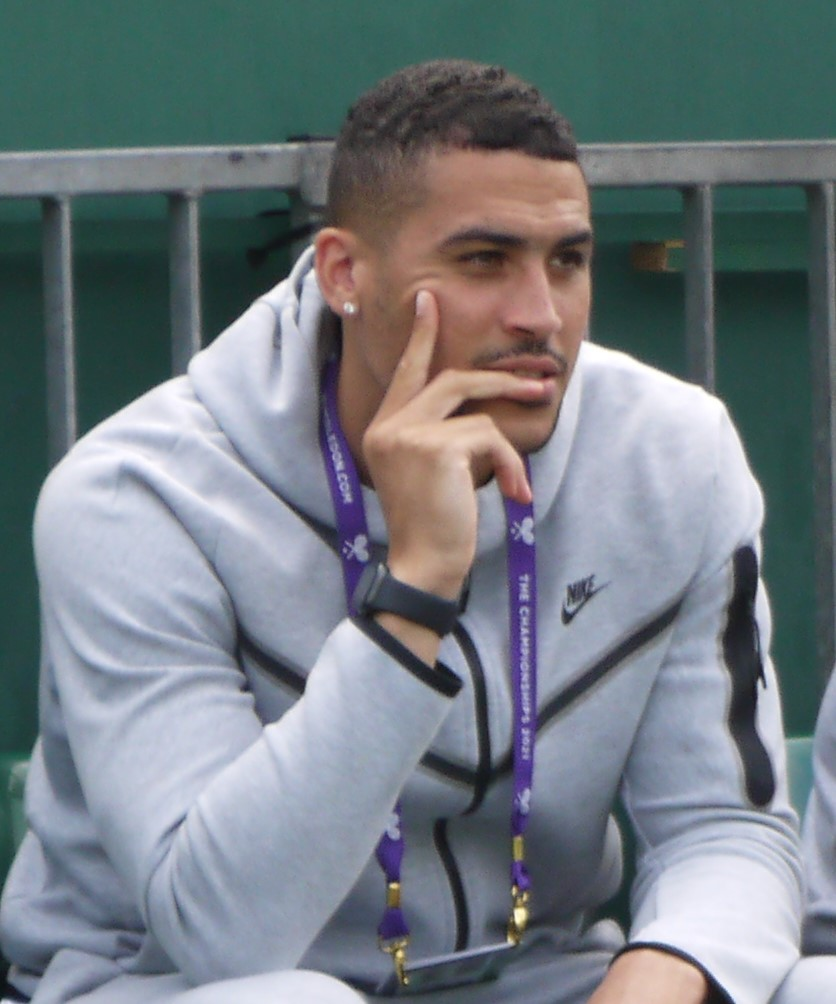
- Duffus in 2021

Personal information
- Full name: Courtney Duffus
- Date of birth: 24 October 1995 (age 31)
- Place of birth: Cheltenham, England
- Height: 6 ft 2 in (1.88 m)
- Position: Forward

Team information
- Current team: Bootle

Youth career
- –2012: Cheltenham Town
- 2012–2014: Everton

Senior career*
Years	Team	Apps	(Gls)
2014–2017	Everton	0	(0)
2014	→ Bury (loan)	3	(0)
2017–2019	Oldham Athletic	6	(0)
2018	→ Waterford (loan)	25	(10)
2019–2021	Yeovil Town	57	(18)
2021	Bromley	18	(5)
2021–2023	Morecambe	8	(0)
2022	→ Stockport County (loan)	1	(0)
2023–2024	Barrow	5	(0)
2024	→ Hartlepool United (loan)	9	(0)
2024	Macclesfield	5	(0)
2024–	Bootle	63	(20)

International career
2016–2017	Republic of Ireland U21	3	(1)
- * Club domestic league appearances and goals as of 21:29, 22 May 2026 (UTC)

Courtney Duffus (born 24 October 1995) is a professional footballer who plays as a forward for Bootle. He is a former Republic of Ireland U21 international.

== Club career ==
=== Everton ===
Duffus joined Everton in the summer of 2012 from Cheltenham Town. It came after Courtney, along with his younger brother, Tyrone impressed in the trial earlier that year.

While at the academy, Duffus progressed through the ranks for the side and helped the side win the Gothia Cup and the league's U18 title. After being recalled from a loan spell at Bury, Duffus returned to the reserves and appeared in the first team as an unused substitute, in a 4–1 win over BSC Young Boys on 19 February 2015, in the Round of 32 of the UEFA Europa League. Despite suffering a knee injury following this, Duffus signed a two-year contract with the club at the end of the season.

In the 2015–16 season, Duffus played a vital role for the reserve side when he regained his form at the end of the year and his performance resulted him being named the Premier League's Under-21 Player of the Month for March. The following season saw Duffus helped the side win the Premier League U23 title. After the 2016–17 season ended, which saw Tyrone released, Duffus signed a one-year contract extension with the club.

==== Bury (loan) ====
On 24 October 2014, Duffus joined League Two side Bury on loan until January. He made his debut a day later, starting the match and playing 59 minutes in a 1–1 draw with Southend United at Roots Hall. Duffus went on to make two appearances for the side before being recalled in November 2014.

=== Oldham Athletic ===
Not long after signing a contract with Everton, on 18 July 2017, Duffus joined Oldham Athletic on an undisclosed fee, signing a two-year contract with the option of a third. Upon joining the club, he was given a number 21 shirt ahead of the new season.

Duffus made his Oldham Athletic debut, coming on as a second-half substitute, in a 2–0 loss against Oxford United in the opening game of the season.

==== Waterford (loan) ====
In February 2018 Duffus joined League of Ireland Premier Division side Waterford on loan. On 26 February, he made his debut, starting in the 2–0 win over St Patrick's Athletic. Duffus scored his first goal for Waterford in the 2–1 win over Sligo Rovers. Duffus scored two crucial goals for Waterford as he was named man of the match in their 2–1 over Shamrock Rovers on the 23 March.

=== Yeovil Town ===
On 31 January 2019, Duffus joined Yeovil Town on a 2 1/2-year deal for an undisclosed fee.

=== Bromley ===
On 15 January 2021, Duffus left Yeovil Town to join fellow National League side Bromley for an undisclosed fee.

=== Morecambe ===
On 19 August 2021, Duffus joined League One side Morecambe for an undisclosed fee signing a two-year contract.

On 24 March 2022, Duffus joined National League club Stockport County on loan until the end of the 2021–22 season. He made his debut on 2 May in Stockport's 1–0 win away at Chesterfield.

=== Barrow ===
On 7 June 2023, Duffus agreed to join Barrow on an initial one-year deal with the option for a further year. On 8 January 2024, he signed for National League club Hartlepool United until the end of the season. He made his Hartlepool debut the following day as a half-time substitute in a 2–1 defeat to AFC Fylde. He made ten appearances for Hartlepool in all competitions without scoring. At the end of the 2023–24 season, Duffus was released by Barrow. Duffus made nine appearances in all competitions for Barrow without scoring.

=== Macclesfield ===
On 19 August 2024, it was announced that Duffus had joined Northern Premier League club Macclesfield following his departure from Barrow.

=== Bootle ===
On 17 October 2024, Duffus joined Northern Premier League Division One West club Bootle.

== International career ==
Duffus, and his brother Tyrone, are eligible to play for England (due to being born there), Republic of Ireland, due to his Irish mother, and Jamaica, due to his Jamaican father.

In September 2016, Duffus was called by Republic of Ireland U21 for the first time and made his first appearance for Republic of Ireland U21s in a Euro qualifier against Slovenia. Duffus scored his first Republic of Ireland U21 goal in his third appearance for the national side, in a 3–1 loss against Serbia U21.

== Personal life ==
Courtney's younger brother, Tyrone, plays for Swindon Supermarine. The pair also attended All Saints' Academy. Between 2019 and 2022, Duffus was in a relationship with British tennis player Heather Watson.

== Career statistics ==
As of match played 25 April 2026

Appearances and goals by club, season and competition
Club	Season	League			National Cup (Note: Includes FA Cup, FAI Cup)		League Cup (Note: Includes EFL Cup, League of Ireland Cup)		Other		Total	
Club	Season	Division	Apps	Goals	Apps	Goals	Apps	Goals	Apps	Goals	Apps	Goals
Everton	2014–15	Premier League	0	0	0	0	0	0	0	0	0	0
Everton	2015–16	Premier League	0	0	0	0	0	0	—		0	0
Everton	2016–17	Premier League	0	0	0	0	0	0	—		0	0
Everton	Total		0	0	0	0	0	0	—		0	0
Everton U23	2016–17	—			—		—		1 (Note: Appearance(s) in EFL Trophy)	0	1	0
Bury (loan)	2014–15	League Two	3	0	1	0	0	0	1	0	5	0
Oldham Athletic	2017–18	League One	6	0	0	0	1	0	2	0	9	0
Oldham Athletic	2018–19	League Two	0	0	0	0	0	0	0	0	0	0
Oldham Athletic	Total		6	0	0	0	1	0	2	0	9	0
Waterford (loan)	2018	LOI Premier Division	25	10	1	0	1	1	—		27	11
Yeovil Town	2018–19	League Two	16	1	—		—		—		16	1
Yeovil Town	2019–20	National League	31	13	1	0	—		4 (Note: Three appearances and three goals in FA Trophy, one appearance in National League play-offs)	3	36	16
Yeovil Town	2020–21	National League	10	4	1	0	—		0	0	11	4
Yeovil Town	Total		57	18	2	0	—		4	3	63	21
Bromley	2020–21	National League	18	5	—		—		1 (Note: Appearance(s) in FA Trophy)	0	19	5
Morecambe	2021–22	League One	7	0	0	0	1	0	0	0	8	0
Morecambe	2022–23	League One	1	0	0	0	0	0	0	0	1	0
Morecambe	Total		8	0	0	0	1	0	0	0	9	0
Stockport County (loan)	2021–22	National League	1	0	—		—		3 (Note: Appearances in Cheshire Senior Cup)	1	4	1
Barrow	2023–24	League Two	5	0	0	0	1	0	3	0	9	0
Hartlepool United (loan)	2023–24	National League	9	0	—		—		1	0	10	0
Macclesfield	2024–25	NPL Premier Division	5	0	3	0	—		1	0	9	0
Bootle	2024–25	NPL Division One West	26	6	—		—		1 (Note: Appearance in Liverpool Senior Cup)	0	27	6
Bootle	2025–26	NPL Division One West	37	14	5	1	—		1	0	43	15
Bootle	Total		63	20	5	1	0	0	2	0	70	21
Career total			200	53	12	1	4	1	19	4	235	59
