= Joel Senior (footballer, born 1999) =

English footballer (born 1999)

Personal information
- Full name: Joel Toby Senior
- Date of birth: 24 June 1999 (age 27)
- Place of birth: Didsbury, England
- Height: 1.81 m (5 ft 11 in)
- Position: Right back

Team information
- Current team: Tranmere Rovers
- Number: 2

Youth career
- 2004–2014: Oldham Athletic

Senior career*
Years	Team	Apps	(Gls)
2014–2015	Hough End		
2015–2017	Maine Road		
2017–2019	F.C. United of Manchester	58	(0)
2019	Curzon Ashton	10	(0)
2019–2020	Burnley	0	(0)
2020–2022	Altrincham	61	(0)
2022–2023	Carlisle United	17	(1)
2023–2024	Morecambe	43	(1)
2024–2026	Bristol Rovers	50	(0)
2026–	Tranmere Rovers	15	(0)
- * Club domestic league appearances and goals as of 14:27, 22 November 2026 (UTC)

Joel Toby Senior (born 24 June 1999) is an English professional footballer who plays as a right back for EFL League Two club Tranmere Rovers.

== Early and personal life ==
Senior was born in Didsbury. His brothers are also footballers, who played in non-league for Maine Road.

== Career ==
Senior spent nearly a decade with Oldham Athletic, but was released at the age of 15 for being too small. He later described it was the worst day of his life. He began playing non-league football around Greater Manchester, initially with Sunday league team Hough End. At the age of 16 he was playing for Maine Road and working two days a week in an engineering and design company. He was also included in the 2016 North West Counties Football League team of the year.

He then made 68 appearances in all competitions for F.C. United of Manchester, including 58 league appearances between 2017 and 2019. His only goal for F.C. United of Manchester was in the 2017–18 Manchester Premier Cup final, and he moved to Curzon Ashton in February 2019, for whom he made ten league appearances in National League North.

In May 2019 he signed a 12-month contract with Premier League club Burnley, with the option of a further year, with the intention that he would initially play with their under-23 team.

He was released by Burnley at the end of the 2019–20 season. He later signed for Altrincham. He signed for Carlisle United in January 2022.

On 30 May 2023, after Carlisle won promotion to League One, Carlisle manager Paul Simpson announced that Senior would be released once his contract expired.

In June 2023, it was announced that he would sign for League Two side Morecambe on a one-year deal from 1 July 2023. Following a successful first season, Senior was named as Morecambe's Player of the Year, also winning Players' Player of the Season. Despite having been offered a new contract, he opted to depart the club at the end of the 2023–24 season.

=== Bristol Rovers ===
On 29 June 2024, Senior agreed to join League One side Bristol Rovers on a two-year deal with the option for a further season. In his fourth appearance for the club, a 2–0 defeat to Stockport County, Senior suffered a torn hamstring, likely to rule him out of action for a period of around two months according to manager Matt Taylor.

On 19 June 2026, the club announced that manager Steve Evans had agreed to allow Senior to depart the club in order for the player to move closer to his family.

=== Tranmere Rovers ===
On 29 June 2026, Senior agreed to join fellow League Two club Tranmere Rovers on a two-year deal. The move saw him reunite with his former Bristol Rovers manager from the first half of the previous season, Darrell Clarke.

== Career statistics ==
As of match played 21 November 2026

Appearances and goals by club, season and competition
Club	Season	League			FA Cup		League Cup		Other		Total	
Club	Season	Division	Apps	Goals	Apps	Goals	Apps	Goals	Apps	Goals	Apps	Goals
F.C. United of Manchester	2017–18	National League North	39	0	3	0	—		3 (Note: One appearance in FA Trophy, two appearances in Manchester Premier Cup)	1	45	1
F.C. United of Manchester	2018–19	National League North	19	0	0	0	—		4 (Note: One appearance in FA Trophy, three appearances in Manchester Premier Cup)	0	23	0
F.C. United of Manchester	Total		58	0	3	0	0	0	7	1	68	1
Curzon Ashton	2018–19	National League North	10	0	—		—		0	0	10	0
Altrincham	2020–21	National League	40	0	0	0	—		1 (Note: Appearance(s) in FA Trophy)	0	41	0
Altrincham	2021–2	National League	21	0	3	0	—		1	0	25	0
Altrincham	Total		61	0	3	0	0	0	2	0	66	0
Carlisle United	2021–22	League Two	4	0	0	0	0	0	1 (Note: Appearance(s) in EFL Trophy)	0	5	0
Carlisle United	2022–23	League Two	13	1	0	0	0	0	3 (Note: Appearances in EFL League Two play-offs)	0	16	1
Carlisle United	Total		17	1	0	0	0	0	4	0	21	1
Morecambe	2023–24	League Two	43	1	3	0	1	0	3	0	50	1
Bristol Rovers	2024–25	League One	19	0	2	0	1	0	1	0	23	0
Bristol Rovers	2025–26	League Two	31	0	0	0	1	0	3	0	35	0
Bristol Rovers	Total		50	0	2	0	2	0	4	0	58	0
Tranmere Rovers	2026–27	League Two	15	0	1	0	1	0	0	0	17	0
Career total			254	2	12	0	4	0	20	1	290	3

== Honours ==
FC United of Manchester

- Manchester Premier Cup: 2017–18

Carlisle United

- EFL League Two play-offs: 2023

Individual

- Morecambe Supporters' Player of the Season: 2023–24
- Morecambe Players' Player of the Season: 2023–24
