= 2024 National League play-off final =

- Event: 2023–24 National League
Bromley	Solihull Moors
2	2
- After extra time Bromley won 4–3 on penalties
- Date: 5 May 2024
- Venue: Wembley Stadium, London
- Attendance: 23,374

The 2024 National League play-off final, known as the Vanarama National League Promotion Final for sponsorship reasons, was an association football match played on 5 May 2024 at Wembley Stadium, London, between Bromley and Solihull Moors.

The match determined the second and final team to gain promotion from the National League, the fifth tier of English football, to EFL League Two. The champions of the 2023–24 National League season gained automatic promotion to EFL League Two, while the teams placed from second to seventh took part in the play-offs; Barnet finished in second position while Solihull Moors finished in fifth position. Barnet and Altrincham were the losing semi-finalists, while FC Halifax Town had lost at the eliminator stage. Gateshead had been forced to withdraw from the play-offs due to being unable to meet the EFL's ground regulation rules.

This was the second National League play-off final (after the 2019 final) in which neither of the teams had played EFL football beforehand.

== Route to the final ==
This was the fourth meeting of the season between the two clubs. The National League match at Solihull's Damson Park ended in a 1–1 draw, while Bromley won the reverse fixture 3–0 at their Hayes Lane ground. Solihull fared better in the FA Trophy, winning 2–1 away at Bromley in the semi-final.

National League final table, leading positions
Pos	Team	Pld	W	D	L	GF	GA	GD	Pts
1	Chesterfield	46	31	5	10	106	65	+41	98
2	Barnet	46	26	8	12	91	60	+31	86
3	Bromley	46	22	15	9	73	49	+24	81
4	Altrincham	46	22	11	13	84	59	+25	77
5	Solihull Moors	46	21	13	12	71	62	+9	76
6	Gateshead	46	22	9	15	88	64	+24	75
7	FC Halifax Town	46	19	14	13	58	50	+8	71

=== Quarter-finals ===
24 April 2024	Solihull Moors	4–2	FC Halifax Town	Solihull
19:00 BST	Campbell 14'; Stevens 19'; Golden 38' (o.g.); Osborne 87'	Report	Evans 45+1'; Hoti 74'	Stadium: Damson Park; Attendance: 1,875; Referee: Alan Dale

=== Semi-finals ===
27 April 2024	Barnet	0–4	Solihull Moors	Canons Park
17:30 BST		Report	Clarke 6'; Stevens 26'; Campbell 61'; Sbarra 89'	Stadium: The Hive Stadium; Attendance: 4,560; Referee: Michael Barlow

28 April 2024	Bromley	3–1	Altrincham	Bromley
16:00 BST	Weston 51', 60'; Arthurs 56'	Report	Linney 31'	Stadium: Hayes Lane; Attendance: 5,000; Referee: Ruebyn Ricardo

== Broadcasting ==
The match was televised live on TNT Sports 2. Audio commentary was provided by BBC Local Radio, with BBC Radio London covering the game for Bromley and BBC Radio WM for Solihull Moors.

== Match ==
=== Details ===
5 May 2024
15:00 BST

Bromley	2–2 (a.e.t.)	Solihull Moors
Cheek 41', 58' (pen.)	Report	Sbarra 48'; Osborne 65'
Penalties
Cheek (penalty scored); Charles (penalty missed); Olomola (penalty scored); Arthurs (penalty scored); Webster (penalty scored)	4–3	(penalty missed) Shade; (penalty missed) Labadie; (penalty scored) Campbell; (penalty scored) Boateng; (penalty scored) Benton

Wembley Stadium, London
Attendance: 23,374
Referee: James Durkin

GK	1	(England) Grant Smith	(yellow card) 120+7'
DF	2	(England) Callum Reynolds	(yellow card) 113'
DF	16	(England) Kamarl Grant
DF	17	(England) Byron Webster
DF	30	(England) Idris Odutayo
MF	4	(Grenada) Ashley Charles
MF	20	(England) Jude Arthurs
MF	40	(Antigua and Barbuda) Myles Weston		(substituted off) 60'
FW	9	(England) Michael Cheek
FW	11	(England) Louis Dennis		(substituted off) 82'
FW	18	(England) Corey Whitely
Substitutes:
GK	41	(Wales) Lewis Thomas
DF	15	(England) Alex Kirk		(substituted on) 60'
MF	6	(England) Sam Woods
FW	29	(England) Olufela Olomola		(substituted on) 82'
FW	42	(England) Will Davies
Manager:
(England) Andy Woodman

GK	32	(England) Nick Hayes
DF	2	(Republic of Ireland) James Clarke
DF	3	(England) Joe Newton
DF	6	(England) Kyle Morrison		(substituted off) 101'
DF	35	(England) Alex Whitmore
MF	4	(England) Jamey Osborne	(yellow card) 88'	(substituted off) 95'
MF	7	(England) Joe Sbarra		(substituted off) 111'
MF	8	(England) Callum Maycock
FW	10	(Saint Kitts and Nevis) Tyrese Shade
FW	14	(England) Jack Stevens		(substituted off) 69'
FW	29	(England) Tahvon Campbell
Substitutes:
DF	21	(England) Max Taylor		(substituted on) 101'
MF	17	(England) Joss Labadie		(substituted on) 95'
MF	18	(England) Jon Benton		(substituted on) 69'
FW	9	(England) Mark Beck
FW	33	(England) Nana Boateng		(substituted on) 111'
Head coach:
(England) Andy Whing
