= Besart Topalloj =

Kosovan footballer (born 2001)

Personal information
- Full name: Besart Topalloj
- Date of birth: 16 May 2001 (age 25)
- Place of birth: Bromley, England
- Position: Defender

Team information
- Current team: Sutton United
- Number: 3

Youth career
- 2016–2023: Millwall

Senior career*
Years	Team	Apps	(Gls)
2022–2023	Millwall	0	(0)
2022	→ Dagenham & Redbridge (loan)	1	(0)
2022–2023	→ Bromley (loan)	4	(1)
2023–2026	Bromley	59	(2)
2024–2025	→ Sutton United (loan)	25	(1)
2025–2026	→ Hartlepool United (loan)	21	(1)
2026–	Sutton United	20	(0)
- * Club domestic league appearances and goals as of 00:38, 26 April 2026 (UTC)

Besart Topalloj (born 16 May 2001) is a Kosovan professional footballer who plays as a defender for National League club Sutton United.

== Career ==
=== Millwall ===
Topalloj joined the Millwall academy aged fifteen, progressing through the academy to captain the under-21 side. In September 2022, he joined National League club Dagenham & Redbridge on a one-month loan deal. Having been training with the first-team, Millwall manager Gary Rowett explained the need for first-team minutes as the driving factor behind the loan move.

=== Bromley ===
On 23 December 2022, Topalloj returned to the National League, joining Bromley on an initial one-month loan deal. On 19 January 2023, he joined the club on a permanent deal. Following the move, he credited the desire to play regular first-team football as the driving factor behind leaving Millwall.

Having lost his place to Idris Odutayo toward the end of the 2023–24 season, Topalloj failed to make the matchday squad as Bromley defeated Solihull Moors on penalties to earn promotion to the English Football League for the first time in the club's history. Following promotion, he signed a new contract.

On 22 November 2024, Topalloj returned to the National League, joining Sutton United on loan until January 2025 with the view to extending until the end of the season, a clause that was subsequently activated.

On 18 July 2025, Topalloj joined National League side Hartlepool United on loan until the end of January 2026, with the option to make the move permanent.

On 2 January 2026, Topalloj has his contract with Bromley terminated by mutual consent.

=== Sutton United ===
On 7 January 2026, Topalloj returned to National League club Sutton United.

== Career statistics ==
As of 18 April 2026

Appearances and goals by club, season and competition
Club	Season	League			FA Cup		League Cup		Other		Total	
Club	Season	Division	Apps	Goals	Apps	Goals	Apps	Goals	Apps	Goals	Apps	Goals
Millwall	2022–23	Championship	0	0	0	0	0	0	—		0	0
Dagenham & Redbridge (loan)	2022–23	National League	1	0	0	0	—		0	0	1	0
Bromley (loan)	2022–23	National League	4	1	0	0	—		0	0	4	1
Bromley	2022–23	National League	20	1	0	0	—		2 (Note: Appearances in National League play-offs)	0	22	1
Bromley	2023–24	National League	36	1	2	0	—		3 (Note: Appearances in FA Trophy)	0	41	1
Bromley	2024–25	League Two	3	0	0	0	1	0	3 (Note: Appearances in EFL Trophy)	0	7	0
Bromley	Total		63	3	2	0	1	0	8	0	74	3
Sutton United (loan)	2024–25	National League	25	1	0	0	—		2	0	27	1
Hartlepool United (loan)	2025–26	National League	21	1	2	0	—		0	0	23	1
Sutton United	2025–26	National League	20	0	0	0	—		0	0	20	0
Career total			130	5	4	0	1	0	10	0	145	5
