= Michael Cheek =

English footballer (born 1991)

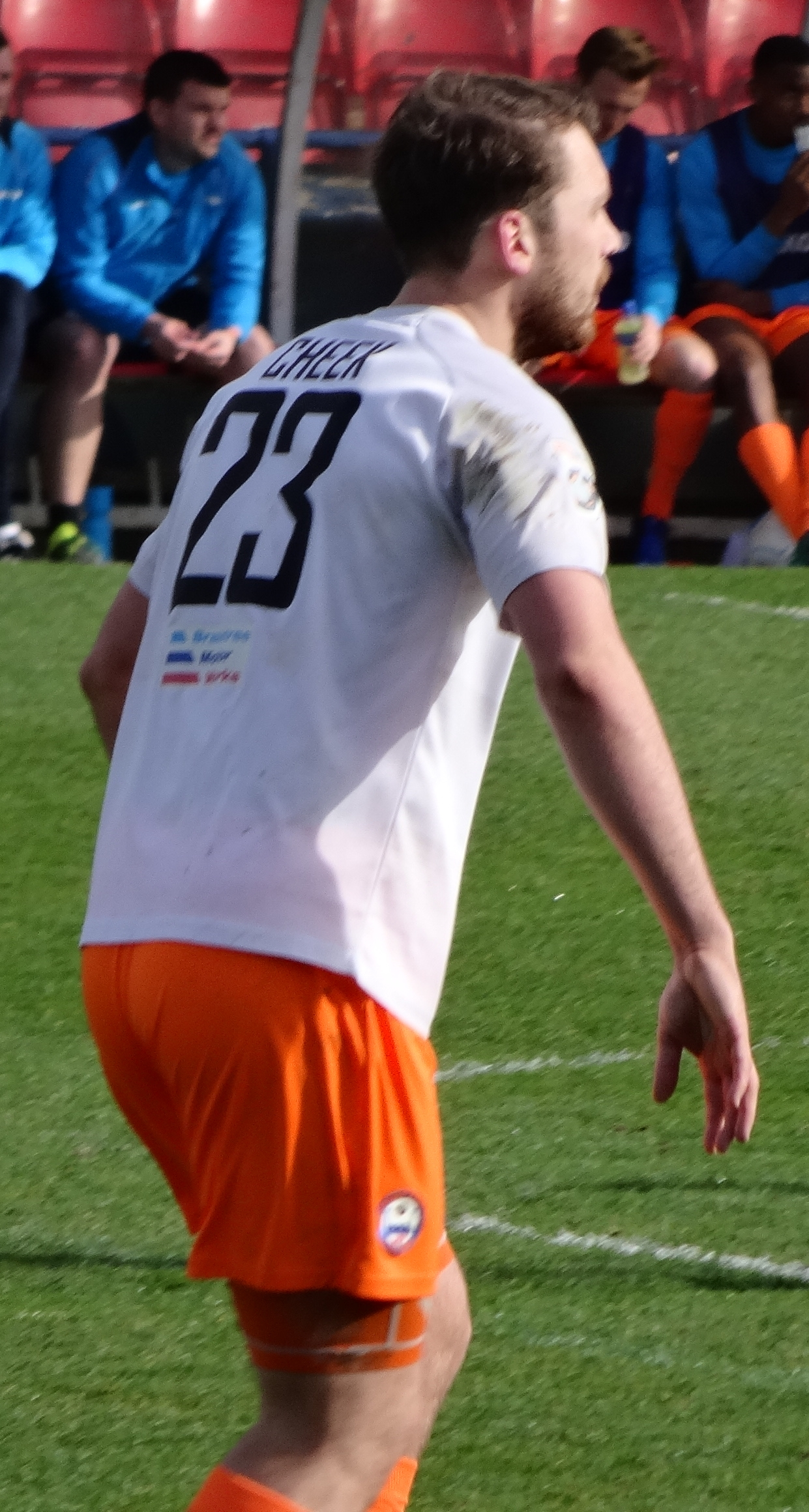
- Cheek with Braintree Town in 2017

Personal information
- Full name: Michael Harry Cheek
- Date of birth: 23 August 1991 (age 35)
- Place of birth: Nuneaton, England
- Height: 6 ft 1 in (1.85 m)
- Position: Striker

Team information
- Current team: Bromley
- Number: 9

Youth career
- Port Vale

Senior career*
| Years | Team | Apps | (Gls) |
| 2008–2009 | Stanway Rovers | 5 | (0) |
| 2009–2011 | Marks Tey | 8 | (11) |
| 2011–2012 | Stanway Rovers | 54 | (28) |
| 2012–2014 | Heybridge Swifts | | |
| 2014–2015 | Chelmsford City | 59 | (27) |
| 2015–2017 | Braintree Town | 84 | (34) |
| 2017–2018 | Dagenham & Redbridge | 34 | (13) |
| 2018–2019 | Ebbsfleet United | 39 | (16) |
| 2019– | Bromley | 300 | (131) |

International career
| 2022 | England C | 1 | (0) |
- * Club domestic league appearances and goals as of 17:10, 24 October 2026 (UTC)

Michael Harry Cheek (born 23 August 1991) is an English professional footballer who plays as a striker for EFL League One club Bromley.

Cheek played non-League football at a low level initially, turning out for Stanway Rovers in the Eastern Counties League and Marks Tey in the Colchester & East Essex League. He moved on to Heybridge Swifts of the Isthmian League in May 2012. He then secured a move to Conference South club Chelmsford City in January 2014. He was named Chelmsford City Player of the Year for the 2014–15 season and moved up a division to Braintree Town in May 2015. He scored 34 goals in 84 National League games over two seasons, though he could not prevent the club from being relegated. In June 2017, he turned professional by signing for Dagenham & Redbridge. He was sold to Ebbsfleet United in August 2018, where he continued his excellent scoring record despite the club's financial problems.

He joined Bromley in May 2019 and went on to become the top scorer of the National League at the end of the 2020–21 campaign, also winning a place on the National League Team of the Year. He was capped by England C in 2022 and scored the winning goal for Bromley in the 2022 FA Trophy final. He scored two goals in the 2024 National League play-off final victory to win Bromley promotion to the English Football League (EFL). He turned 33 shortly after playing his first EFL game, though he belied his age by winning the League Two Golden Boot at the end of the 2024–25 season, being named on the Team of the Season and PFA Team of the Year, as well as the League Two Player of the Year award. Bromley won the EFL League Two title at the end of the 2025–26 season and he was again named on the League Two PFA Team of the Year.

== Career ==
=== Early career ===
Cheek spent time in the youth team at Port Vale, though he did not enjoy his time at Vale Park. He moved to Colchester following his parents' separation, and spent a year on the east coast of Australia at age 18. He returned to England and began his senior career with Stanway Rovers, whilst working as a barista in a café in the corner of a furniture store. He later spent six years working the night shift at a call centre for the breakdown recovery arm of an insurance company. He played for Marks Tey in the Colchester & East Essex League between 2009 and 2011. He re-joined Stanway for a second spell, where he scored 34 goals in 60 games in all competitions, before signing for Heybridge Swifts in May 2012.

=== Chelmsford City ===
In January 2014, following 13 goals in 20 Isthmian League Division One North appearances for Heybridge Swifts during the opening months of the 2013–14 season, Cheek signed for Conference South club Chelmsford City. Cheek's arrival at the club followed former Heybridge manager Mark Hawkes, who had joined Chelmsford in November 2013. On 21 January 2014, in his second game for the club, Cheek scored his first Chelmsford goal, in a 3–1 win away to Concord Rangers. Cheek finished the 2013–14 season with 12 goals from 20 appearances, a tally which included four goals in a 7–1 win over Tonbridge Angels on Easter Monday.

On 28 December 2014, Cheek recorded his second four-goal haul for Chelmsford in a 5–3 win away over Staines Town. Despite only scoring one goal in his final 13 appearances for Chelmsford, Cheek scored 23 goals in 46 appearances in all competitions for the club during the 2014–15 season. He won the club's Player of the Year award.

=== Braintree Town ===
On 23 May 2015, Cheek signed for National League club Braintree Town. Upon signing, Braintree boss Danny Cowley said "Cheek was the best all-round forward in the Conference South last year". Braintree qualified for the play-offs at the end of the 2015–16 season, which Cowley described as "nothing short of a miracle". They lost out to Grimsby Town in the semi-finals. After scoring 15 league goals in his debut season for the club, Cheek signed a new one-year deal with Braintree in June.

Ahead of the 2016–17 season, after playing as a lone striker in the previous campaign, Cheek's role at Cressing Road changed, following the appointment of Jamie Day and the signings of Lee Barnard and Jack Midson. Day was sacked in September, and was replaced by Hakan Hayrettin, who demanded his players to work hard in every match. Cheek scored a hat-trick in a 5–2 victory at East Thurrock United in the FA Trophy. He scored 19 goals in 44 league appearances as Braintree were relegated back to the National League South. He was the division's fourth-highest scorer and also claimed eight assists.

=== Dagenham & Redbridge ===
On 15 June 2017, Cheek signed a two-year deal with National League club Dagenham & Redbridge, at which point he became a fully professional footballer. He suffered a knee injury, which he recovered from. He had the opportunity to leave Victoria Road in January after a transfer was agreed, though he instead chose to stay on and help the club during a difficult period. He scored 13 goals in 36 games across the 2017–18 campaign, helping John Still's Daggers to an 11th-place finish.

=== Ebbsfleet United ===
On 2 August 2018, Cheek signed for fellow National League side Ebbsfleet United for an undisclosed fee. He started four of the club's first 20 league games under Daryl McMahon, before gaining starts after new manager Garry Hill switched to a front-two formation with him and Danny Kedwell. Cheek was named as National League Player of the Month for December after scoring eight goals in 10 games. He was named on the National League Team of the Week after scoring a brace in a 4–2 win over Wrexham at Stonebridge Road on 30 March. He scored 16 goals in 39 league games during the 2018–19 campaign, ending as the division's sixth-highest scorer. Off-field financial issues meant that Ebbsfleet players were paid late, though the club denied accusations of deceiving their players. He remained under contract, though he was moved on to help ease the club's financial pressures. Upon his departure, Cheek said to the local press "This season has definitely taught me a lot, on and off the field. I've met some great players and I've learned that, as a team, we can do more even if off-field issues are a problem. It's the best group of players I've played with in all honesty, characters and talent-wise. It's just a shame the way it's ended."

=== Bromley ===
On 10 May 2019, Cheek signed for National League club Bromley. Manager Neil Smith said that "to get someone of his quality into our side for next season is massive for us". Cheek scored on his home debut for Bromley against his former club Ebbsfleet in a 3–1 win on 6 August. He scored 15 times in 45 appearances in the 2019–20 campaign. In January 2021, he signed a new deal with the club. Following the 2020–21 season, Cheek won the Golden Boot award after scoring 21 league goals for Bromley in the National League, as well as a further four in cup competitions. He was named on the National League Team of the Season.

On 22 May 2022, Cheek scored the only goal in the FA Trophy final against Wrexham at Wembley Stadium. He was named on the National League Team of the Year, having scored 17 goals in 42 league games across the 2021–22 campaign. He then hit 17 goals in 47 games in all competitions in the 2022–23 season. On 17 February 2024, he scored a hat-trick in a 4–3 victory over Chesterfield in a top-of-the-table clash at Hayes Lane. On 5 May 2024, he scored twice at Wembley in the play-off final. Bromley drew the game 2–2 and won 4–3 on penalties against Solihull Moors. Cheek also scored his penalty in the shootout. The win meant that Bromley had secured promotion to the English Football League for the first time in the club's history. Overall, he scored 26 goals in 53 appearances across the 2023–24 season.

On 10 August 2024, Cheek scored Bromley's first goal in the Football League, in a 2–0 win away to Harrogate Town. He also won 11 aerial duels during the game, earning himself the fifth-highest rating in League Two that weekend. He was nominated for the League Two Player of the Month award after scoring three of Bromley's four goals in September. He was named League Two Player of the Week after scoring the only goal of the game against Fleetwood Town on 15 February, also winning 12 aerial duels during the match. He was nominated again as that month's League Two Player of the Month following three goals and two assists. On 27 April, he was named League Two Player of the Season. He was also the division's Golden Boot with 25 goals, six more than any other player, and claimed seven assists to take him to 32 goal involvements. He was also named as PFA League Two Players' Player of the Year.

Cheek was reported to have handed in a transfer request in August 2025, though manager Andy Woodman insisted that Cheek was one year into a three-year contract and was going nowhere "unless Liverpool want to take him instead of Isak". The club rejected multiple bids from Stevenage. He continued his good form despite such speculation, being the top performer of gameweek seven by scoring and assisting in a 2–2 draw with Gillingham. On 29 December, he scored a hat-trick in a 3–1 win at Crawley Town. By this time he had already established himself as Bromley's highest goalscorer in the modern era, not counting amateur player George Brown's tally of 570 goals set between 1938 and 1961, but surpassing Butch Dunn's tally of 132 goals set between 1978 and 1982. On 10 January, he scored both goals in a 2–0 victory at Tranmere Rovers, also winning 14 aerial duels as he secured consecutive EFL Team of the Week inclusions. He picked up another brace on 28 February, converting two penalties in a 2–1 win over Accrington Stanley, also making two key passes and a header against the crossbar. He was named on the League Two Team of the Season, having the joint-third-highest goal tally in the division with 16 league goals. He had been the joint-highest scorer in the division when his season was ended by injury at the start of March. Bromley secured promotion as champions of League Two. He was also named again on the League Two PFA Team of the Year.

Cheek scored his first goal in the third tier on 24 October 2026, netting in a 1–1 draw with Peterborough United in League One.

== International career ==
In March 2022, Cheek played for the England C team in a friendly against Wales C.

== Style of play ==
Cheek gained a reputation as one of the best strikers in League Two by 2025, owing to his ability to score with both of his feet and his head, using his good technique and physical strength.

== Career statistics ==
As of match played 24 October 2026

Appearances and goals by club, season and competition
| Club | Season | League | | | FA Cup | | EFL Cup | | Other | | Total | |
| Club | Season | Division | Apps | Goals | Apps | Goals | Apps | Goals | Apps | Goals | Apps | Goals |
|---|---|---|---|---|---|---|---|---|---|---|---|---|
| Stanway Rovers | 2008–09 | Eastern Counties League; Premier Division | 4 | 0 | 0 | 0 | — | | 2 (Note: Appearance(s) in Eastern Counties League Challenge Cup) | 0 | 6 | 0 |
| Stanway Rovers | 2009–10 | Eastern Counties League; Premier Division | 1 | 0 | 0 | 0 | — | | 0 | 0 | 1 | 0 |
| Stanway Rovers | Total | | 5 | 0 | 0 | 0 | — | | 2 | 0 | 7 | 0 |
| Marks Tey | 2009–10 | Colchester & East Essex League; Division Three | 5 | 7 | — | | — | | 5 (Note: Two appearances and four goals in Great Bromley Cup, one appearance and one goal in Amos Cup, one appearance and two goals in Essex FA - Junior Trophy, one appearance and four goals in Lexden Memorial Cup) | 11 | 10 | 18 |
| Marks Tey | 2010–11 | Colchester & East Essex League; Division Two | 3 | 4 | — | | — | | 0 | 0 | 3 | 4 |
| Marks Tey | Total | | 8 | 11 | 0 | 0 | — | | 5 | 11 | 13 | 22 |
| Stanway Rovers | 2010–11 | Eastern Counties League; Premier Division | 16 | 8 | 0 | 0 | — | | 0 | 0 | 16 | 8 |
| Stanway Rovers | 2011–12 | Eastern Counties League; Premier Division | 38 | 20 | 0 | 0 | — | | 6 (Note: One appearance and two goals in Essex Senior Cup, five appearances and four goals in Eastern Counties League Challenge Cup) | 6 | 44 | 26 |
| Stanway Rovers | Total | | 54 | 28 | 0 | 0 | — | | 6 | 6 | 60 | 34 |
| Heybridge Swifts | 2012–13 (Note: Heybridge Swifts statistics for 2012–13 not known and therefore not included in totals) | Isthmian League; Division One North | | | | | — | | | | | |
| Heybridge Swifts | 2013–14 | Isthmian League; Division One North | 20 | 13 | | | — | | 7 (Note: Which cup competitions the seven appearances took place in are not recorded) | 0 | 27 | 13 |
| Heybridge Swifts | Total | | 20 | 13 | | | — | | 7 | 0 | 27 | 13 |
| Chelmsford City | 2013–14 | Conference South | 20 | 12 | — | | — | | — | | 20 | 12 |
| Chelmsford City | 2014–15 | Conference South | 39 | 15 | 5 | 5 | — | | 2 (Note: One appearance and one goal in FA Trophy, one appearance and two goals in Essex Senior Cup) | 3 | 46 | 23 |
| Chelmsford City | Total | | 59 | 27 | 5 | 5 | — | | 2 | 3 | 66 | 35 |
| Braintree Town | 2015–16 | National League | 40 | 15 | 3 | 2 | — | | 4 (Note: Two appearances in FA Trophy, two appearances in National League play-offs) | 0 | 47 | 17 |
| Braintree Town | 2016–17 | National League | 44 | 19 | 3 | 3 | — | | 3 (Note: Appearance(s) in FA Trophy) | 3 | 50 | 25 |
| Braintree Town | Total | | 84 | 34 | 6 | 5 | — | | 7 | 3 | 97 | 42 |
| Dagenham & Redbridge | 2017–18 | National League | 34 | 13 | 1 | 0 | — | | 1 | 1 | 36 | 14 |
| Ebbsfleet United | 2018–19 | National League | 39 | 16 | 1 | 0 | — | | 1 | 0 | 41 | 16 |
| Bromley | 2019–20 | National League | 37 | 13 | 3 | 2 | — | | 1 | 0 | 41 | 15 |
| Bromley | 2020–21 | National League | 43 | 23 | 2 | 1 | — | | 2 (Note: One appearance in FA Trophy, one appearance in National League play-offs) | 1 | 47 | 25 |
| Bromley | 2021–22 | National League | 42 | 17 | 2 | 1 | — | | 3 | 5 | 47 | 23 |
| Bromley | 2022–23 | National League | 43 | 15 | 1 | 0 | — | | 3 (Note: One appearance in FA Trophy, two appearances and two goals in National League play-offs) | 2 | 47 | 17 |
| Bromley | 2023–24 | National League | 44 | 21 | 2 | 1 | — | | 7 (Note: Five appearances and two goals in FA Trophy, two appearances and two goals in National League play-offs) | 4 | 53 | 26 |
| Bromley | 2024–25 | League Two | 45 | 25 | 3 | 1 | 1 | 0 | 0 | 0 | 49 | 26 |
| Bromley | 2025–26 | League Two | 35 | 16 | 1 | 0 | 2 | 0 | 0 | 0 | 38 | 16 |
| Bromley | 2026–27 | League One | 11 | 1 | 0 | 0 | 1 | 1 | 2 (Note: Appearances in EFL Trophy) | 0 | 14 | 2 |
| Bromley | Total | | 300 | 131 | 14 | 6 | 4 | 1 | 18 | 12 | 336 | 150 |
| Career total | | | 603 | 273 | 27 | 16 | 4 | 1 | 49 | 36 | 683 | 325 |

== Honours ==
Bromley

- EFL League Two: 2025–26
- National League play-offs: 2024
- FA Trophy: 2021–22

Individual

- Chelmsford City Player of the Year: 2014–15
- National League Player of the Month: December 2018
- National League top scorer: 2020–21
- National League Team of the Year: 2020–21
- EFL League Two Team of the Season: 2024–25
- EFL League Two Player of the Season: 2024–25
- PFA Team of the Year: 2024–25 League Two, 2025–26 League Two
- PFA League Two Players' Player of the Year: 2024–25
