= Olufela Olomola =

English footballer (born 1997)

Personal information
- Full name: Olufela Oladele Ayodeji Olomola
- Date of birth: 5 September 1997 (age 29)
- Place of birth: Brent, England
- Height: 5 ft 7 in (1.70 m)
- Positions: Winger; forward

Team information
- Current team: Wealdstone
- Number: 9

Youth career
- Arsenal
- 2014–2016: Southampton

Senior career*
Years	Team	Apps	(Gls)
2016–2018	Southampton	0	(0)
2017–2018	→ Yeovil Town (loan)	21	(7)
2018–2021	Scunthorpe United	11	(0)
2018–2019	→ Yeovil Town (loan)	17	(3)
2019–2020	→ Carlisle United (loan)	27	(5)
2021–2022	Hartlepool United	12	(0)
2022	→ Yeovil Town (loan)	8	(1)
2022–2023	Wealdstone	47	(7)
2023–2025	Bromley	44	(11)
2025–	Wealdstone	50	(10)
- * Club domestic league appearances and goals as of 21:10, 10 November 2026 (UTC)

Olufela Oladele Ayodeji Olomola (born 5 September 1997) is an English professional footballer who plays as a winger or as a forward for National League club Wealdstone.

Known to teammates as "Fela", Olomola holds both British and Nigerian citizenship.

== Career ==
=== Southampton ===
Born in London, England to Nigerian parents, Olomola is a former Arsenal youth graduate. He scored five goals in 26 appearances for the Southampton under-18s during the 2014–15 campaign. The following season, Olomola was appointed captain of the under-18s side ahead of the 2015–16 season. He was promoted to the Southampton under-21 squad later that season. Olomola was named as an unused substitute by first-team boss Ronald Koeman in Saints' 1–1 home draw against Sunderland on 5 March 2016.

He made a fine start to the 2016–17 campaign, scoring a brace in Southampton's 4–1 away victory over Liverpool at Prenton Park in the first match of the U23 Premier League 2 (Division 2) Championship.

Olomola made his professional debut for Southampton on 26 October 2016, coming on in the 26th minute for Jay Rodriguez in a 1–0 EFL Cup win over Sunderland.

==== Loan to Yeovil ====
On 9 July 2017, Olomola joined League Two club Yeovil Town on loan until January 2018.

==== Return to Southampton ====
Olomola then returned from loan to help the Saints U23s reach the Southampton FA Senior Cup final.

=== Scunthorpe United ===
On 21 May 2018, following his release by Southampton, Olomola signed for League One side Scunthorpe United on a three-year contract.

On 31 August 2018, Olomola returned to Yeovil Town on loan until January 2019.

On 29 July 2019, Olomola joined Carlisle United on a season-long loan deal until the end of the 2019–20 campaign.

He scored his first goal for Scunthorpe on 10 November 2020 in an EFL Trophy group game against Mansfield Town.

He was one of 17 players released by Scunthorpe at the end of the 2020–21 season.

=== Hartlepool United ===
On 21 July 2021, Olomola signed for Hartlepool United following a successful trial. He made his debut in a 1–0 victory against Crawley Town.

On 11 February 2022, Olomola returned to National League side Yeovil Town for a third loan spell, until the end of the 2021–22 season. Due to a high number of injuries in the Hartlepool team, Olomola was recalled by Pools on 21 April 2022. At the end of the 2021–22 season, Olomola was released by Hartlepool.

=== Wealdstone ===
On 20 July 2022, Olomola joined National League side Wealdstone, following his departure from Hartlepool. Olomola scored 16 minutes into his debut in a 3–2 victory against Bromley on 6 August 2022. He would go on to score a total of 10 goals in his first spell at the Stones.

=== Bromley ===
Olomola joined fellow National League side, Bromley, on 6 October 2023 for an undisclosed fee. He scored 10 league goals for Bromley in his first season with the club and came on as a substitute in their 2024 National League play-off final victory at Wembley Stadium, in which he scored in the penalty shoot-out.

On 19 May 2025, the club announced he would be released in June when his contract expired.

=== Return to Wealdstone ===
Having trialled with the club in pre-season, Olomola returned to National League side Wealdstone in September 2025. Having scored 9 times in 44 appearances in his first year back at the club, he signed a contract extension in June 2026.

== Career statistics ==
As of match played 7 November 2026

Appearances and goals by club, season and competition
Club	Season	League			FA Cup		League Cup		Other		Total	
Club	Season	Division	Apps	Goals	Apps	Goals	Apps	Goals	Apps	Goals	Apps	Goals
Southampton	2016–17	Premier League	0	0	0	0	1	0	0	0	1	0
Southampton	2017–18	Premier League	0	0	0	0	0	0	—		0	0
Southampton	Total		0	0	0	0	1	0	0	0	1	0
Southampton U23	2016–17	—			—		—		3 (Note: Appearance(s) in EFL Trophy)	2	3	2
Yeovil Town (loan)	2017–18	League Two	21	7	2	0	1	0	4	0	28	7
Scunthorpe United	2018–19	League One	6	0	0	0	0	0	0	0	6	0
Scunthorpe United	2019–20	League Two	0	0	0	0	0	0	0	0	0	0
Scunthorpe United	2020–21	League Two	5	0	1	0	0	0	1	1	7	1
Scunthorpe United	Total		11	0	1	0	0	0	1	1	13	1
Yeovil Town (loan)	2018–19	League Two	17	3	1	0	0	0	3	0	21	3
Carlisle United (loan)	2019–20	League Two	27	5	3	1	2	0	1	0	33	6
Hartlepool United	2021–22	League Two	12	0	0	0	1	0	4	1	17	1
Yeovil Town (loan)	2021–22	National League	8	1	—		—		1 (Note: Appearance in Somerset Premier Cup)	1	9	2
Wealdstone	2022–23	National League	39	7	1	2	—		2 (Note: One appearance in FA Trophy, one appearance and one goal in Middlesex Senior Cup)	1	42	10
Wealdstone	2023–24	National League	8	0	0	0	—		0	0	8	0
Wealdstone	Total		47	7	1	2	—		2	1	50	10
Bromley	2023–24	National League	28	10	2	0	—		6 (Note: Four appearances in FA Trophy, two appearances in National League play-offs)	1	36	11
Bromley	2024–25	League Two	16	1	2	0	1	0	3	1	22	2
Bromley	Total		44	11	4	0	1	0	9	2	58	13
Wealdstone	2025–26	National League	34	4	3	3	—		7 (Note: Includes National League Cup and FA Trophy)	2	44	9
Wealdstone	2026–27	National League	16	6	2	0	—		3 (Note: Appearances in National League Cup)	1	21	7
Wealdstone	Total		50	10	5	3	—		10	3	65	16
Career total			237	44	17	6	6	0	38	11	298	61

== Honours ==
Bromley

- National League play-offs: 2024

Wealdstone

- FA Trophy runner-up: 2025–26
