= Jude Arthurs =

English footballer (born 2001)

Personal information
- Full name: Jude Robert Arthurs
- Date of birth: 6 August 2001 (age 25)
- Place of birth: Greenwich, England
- Height: 1.75 m (5 ft 9 in)
- Position: Midfielder

Team information
- Current team: Crawley Town
- Number: 20

Youth career
- –2019: Gillingham
- 2019–2021: Bromley

Senior career*
Years	Team	Apps	(Gls)
2019	Gillingham	0	(0)
2019	→ Deal Town (loan)	8	(1)
2019–2026	Bromley	205	(14)
2019	→ Ramsgate (loan)	19	(1)
2020	→ Lewes (loan)	7	(1)
2026–	Crawley Town	0	(0)
- * Club domestic league appearances and goals as of 18:58, 3 July 2026 (UTC)

Jude Robert Arthurs (born 6 August 2001) is an English professional footballer who plays as a midfielder for EFL League Two club Crawley Town.

== Career ==
Arthurs joined the Gillingham academy aged 10 having impressed at the club's Development Centre in Dartford. In February 2019, he joined Southern Counties East Football League Premier Division side Deal Town on a work-experience deal. He was released at the end of the 2018–19 season following the end of his two-year scholarship.

=== Bromley ===
Following his release from Gillingham, Arthurs joined National League side Bromley. Having spent time on loan with Isthmian League South East Division side Ramsgate in the 2019–20 season, he signed a new contract in September 2020 before joining Lewes on a dual-registration basis. He signed a first professional contract at the end of the 2020–21 season.

On 5 May 2024, Arthurs played the entirety of the 2024 National League play-off final, scoring his penalty in the shoot-out as Bromley defeated Solihull Moors to earn promotion to the English Football League for the first time in the club's history. In November 2024, he made his 150th appearance for the club.

On 9 May 2025 the club announced the player had signed a new deal.

Following the club's League Two title-winning 2025–26 season, Arthurs was offered a new contract, however he instead opted to leave the club.

=== Crawley Town ===
On 3 July 2026, Arthurs signed for League Two club Crawley Town on a two-year contract with the option for a further year.

== Career statistics ==
As of end of 2025–26 season

Appearances and goals by club, season and competition
Club	Season	League			FA Cup		EFL Cup		Other		Total	
Club	Season	Division	Apps	Goals	Apps	Goals	Apps	Goals	Apps	Goals	Apps	Goals
Gillingham	2018–19	League Two	0	0	0	0	0	0	0	0	0	0
Deal Town (loan)	2018–19	SCEFL Premier Division	8	1	0	0	—		0	0	8	1
Bromley	2019–20	National League	0	0	0	0	—		0	0	0	0
Bromley	2020–21	National League	16	2	0	0	—		0	0	16	2
Bromley	2021–22	National League	37	3	1	0	—		4 (Note: Appearance(s) in FA Trophy)	0	42	3
Bromley	2022–23	National League	35	3	0	0	—		3 (Note: One appearance in FA Trophy, two appearances in National League play-offs)	0	38	3
Bromley	2023–24	National League	34	1	1	0	—		6 (Note: Four appearances in FA Trophy, two appearances and one goal in National League play-offs)	1	41	2
Bromley	2024–25	League Two	41	4	3	0	1	0	2 (Note: Appearance(s) in EFL Trophy)	0	47	4
Bromley	2025–26	League Two	43	1	1	0	2	1	3	0	49	2
Bromley	Total		206	14	6	0	3	1	18	1	233	16
Ramsgate (loan)	2019–20	Isthmian League South East Division	19	1	0	0	—		2 (Note: Appearance(s) in Alan Turvey Trophy)	0	21	1
Lewes (loan)	2020–21	Isthmian League Premier Division	7	1	0	0	—		1	0	8	1
Career total			240	17	6	0	3	1	21	1	270	19

== Honours ==
Bromley

- EFL League Two: 2025–26
- National League play-offs: 2024
- FA Trophy: 2021–22
