= Ashley Charles =

Grenadian footballer (born 1999)

Personal information
- Full name: Ashley James Charles
- Date of birth: 15 May 1999 (age 27)
- Place of birth: Watford, England
- Height: 1.78 m (5 ft 10 in)
- Position: Midfielder

Team information
- Current team: Bromley
- Number: 4

Youth career
- 2014–2017: Watford

Senior career*
Years	Team	Apps	(Gls)
2017–2019	Watford	0	(0)
2019	→ Barnet (loan)	4	(0)
2019–2024	Wealdstone	129	(2)
2020–2021	→ Concord Rangers (loan)	3	(0)
2024–	Bromley	88	(2)

International career
2022–	Grenada	8	(0)
- * Club domestic league appearances and goals as of 15:43, 13 May 2026 (UTC)

Ashley James Charles (born 15 May 1999) is a footballer who plays as a midfielder for EFL League One club Bromley. Born in England, he plays for the Grenada national team.

== Club career ==
=== Early career ===
Charles began his career in the youth system of his local club Watford, joining the club at under-14s level and signing his first professional contract with them on 7 June 2016. On 31 January 2019, he was loaned to the National League side Barnet for the second half of the 2018–19 season. He was released by Watford in the summer of 2019.

=== Wealdstone ===
In October 2019, Charles signed for National League South side Wealdstone, and was part of the side that won the league title in the 2019–20 season. Following the side's promotion to the National League, Charles found his first team opportunities limited, and in December 2020 he joined Concord Rangers on a 28-day loan deal.

Upon his return to Wealdstone, Charles re-established himself as a starter. On 15 January 2022, Charles scored his first senior goal in a 2–1 win over Dover Athletic, and in June 2022 he signed a contract extension with an option to remain at the club until 2024.

=== Bromley ===
On 1 February 2024, Charles moved to fellow National League side Bromley for an undisclosed fee. He helped the Ravens win promotion to League Two in his first season at the club, playing the full 120 minutes of their play-off final victory over Solihull Moors, although he missed a penalty in the shoot-out.

On 24 January 2026, Charles scored his first Football League goal, netting the equaliser in an eventual 2–1 victory over Swindon Town. He was a regular in the Bromley side that won League Two in 2025–26, appearing in all but one game.

On 4 August 2026, Charles signed a new three-year contract with the Ravens. Four days later, in the club's opening match of the season, he suffered a serious knee injury with manager Andy Woodman estimating that he would miss the entirety of the 2026–27 season.

== International career ==
Born in England, Charles is of Grenadian descent. He was called up to the senior Grenada national team for a set of friendlies in June 2022. He made his international debut with Grenada in a 2–2 CONCACAF Nations League tie with El Salvador on 8 June 2022.

== Personal life ==
Charles was charged with rape and an alternative count of sexual assault by penetration by a woman, on a night out with his friend Dennon Lewis in March 2021. He was found not guilty by a jury in July 2022.

== Career statistics ==
=== Club ===
As of 4 July 2026

Appearances and goals by club, season and competition
Club	Season	League			FA Cup		League Cup		Other		Total	
Club	Season	Division	Apps	Goals	Apps	Goals	Apps	Goals	Apps	Goals	Apps	Goals
Watford	2017–18	Premier League	0	0	0	0	0	0	0	0	0	0
Watford	2018–19	Premier League	0	0	0	0	0	0	0	0	0	0
Watford	Total		0	0	0	0	0	0	0	0	0	0
Barnet (loan)	2018–19	National League	4	0	—		—		3 (Note: Appearance (s) in FA Trophy)	0	7	0
Wealdstone	2019–20	National League South	17	0	1	0	—		0	0	18	0
Wealdstone	2020–21	National League	22	0	0	0	—		0	0	22	0
Wealdstone	2021–22	National League	32	1	1	0	—		1	0	34	1
Wealdstone	2022–23	National League	38	1	1	0	—		1	0	40	1
Wealdstone	2023–24	National League	20	0	1	0	—		2	0	23	0
Wealdstone	Total		129	2	4	0	0	0	4	0	137	2
Concord Rangers (loan)	2020–21	National League South	3	0	—		—		1	0	4	0
Bromley	2023–24	National League	15	0	—		—		2 (Note: Appearances in National League play-offs)	0	17	0
Bromley	2024–25	League Two	28	0	1	0	1	0	2 (Note: Appearances in EFL Trophy)	1	32	1
Bromley	2025–26	League Two	45	2	1	0	2	0	0	0	48	2
Bromley	Total		88	2	2	0	3	0	4	1	97	3
Career total			224	4	6	0	3	0	12	1	245	5

=== International ===
As of match played 16 May 2026

Appearances and goals by national team and year
National team	Year	Apps	Goals
Grenada	2022	3	0
Grenada	2023	2	0
Grenada	2024	2	0
Grenada	2026	1	0
Total		8	0

== Honours ==
Wealdstone

- National League South: 2019–20

Bromley

- EFL League Two: 2025–26
- National League play-offs: 2024
