= 2024–25 Bromley F.C. season =

English football club season

Bromley
2024–25 season
- Owner & Chairman: Robin Stanton-Gleaves
- Manager: Andy Woodman
- Stadium: Hayes Lane
- League Two: 11th
- FA Cup: Third round
- EFL Cup: First round
- EFL Trophy: Group stage
- Top goalscorer: League: Michael Cheek (25); All: Michael Cheek (26)
- Highest home attendance: 4,102 (v. AFC Wimbledon, League Two, 17 August 2024)
- Lowest home attendance: 1,120 (v. Cambridge United, EFL Trophy, 3 September 2024)
- Average home league attendance: 3,111
- Biggest win: 4–0 v. Accrington Stanley (H); League Two, 5 April 2025
- Biggest defeat: 0–5 v. Port Vale (A); League Two, 12 April 2025
Home colours	Away colours	Third colours

The 2024–25 season was the 133rd season in the history of Bromley Football Club and their first ever season in the English Football League, following promotion from the National League in the previous season. The club participates in League Two, the FA Cup, the EFL Cup and the EFL Trophy.

== Squad ==
As of May 2025

Note: Flags indicate national team as defined under FIFA eligibility rules; some limited exceptions apply. Players may hold more than one non-FIFA nationality.

No.	Pos.	Nation	Player
1	GK	ENG	Grant Smith
3	DF	ENG	Deji Elerewe
4	MF	GRN	Ashley Charles
5	DF	ENG	Omar Sowunmi
6	DF	ENG	Carl Jenkinson
9	FW	ENG	Michael Cheek
10	FW	ENG	Marcus Dinanga
11	FW	ENG	Louis Dennis
12	GK	SCO	Sam Long
13	FW	ENG	Harry McKirdy
16	DF	ENG	Kamarl Grant (on loan from Millwall)
17	DF	ENG	Byron Webster (captain)

No.	Pos.	Nation	Player
18	FW	ENG	Corey Whitely
19	FW	ENG	Marcus Ifill
20	MF	ENG	Jude Arthurs
22	MF	WAL	Cameron Congreve (on loan from Swansea City)
25	DF	ENG	Danny Imray (on loan from Crystal Palace)
26	FW	ENG	Nicke Kabamba
29	FW	ENG	Olufela Olomola
30	DF	ENG	Idris Odutayo
31	DF	ENG	Brooklyn Ilunga
32	MF	ENG	Ben Thompson
34	DF	ENG	Adam Mayor (on loan from Millwall)
35	DF	ALB	Maldini Kacurri (on loan from Arsenal)

== Transfers ==
=== In ===
Date	Pos.	Player	From	Fee	Ref.
1 July 2024	CB	(England) Omar Sowunmi	(England) Sutton United	Undisclosed	
2 July 2024	CM	(England) Lewis Leigh	(England) Preston North End	Undisclosed	
3 July 2024	GK	(Scotland) Sam Long	(England) Lincoln City	Undisclosed	
4 July 2024	CF	(England) Marcus Dinanga	(England) Gateshead	Free transfer	
12 July 2024	CB	(England) Taylor Foran	(England) Arsenal	Free transfer	
27 September 2024	RB	(England) Carl Jenkinson	(Australia) Newcastle Jets	Free transfer	
9 January 2025	CM	(England) Ben Thompson	(England) Stevenage	Undisclosed	
10 January 2025	CF	(England) Nicke Kabamba	(England) Barnet	Undisclosed	
14 January 2025	LM	(England) Brooklyn Ilunga	(England) Milton Keynes Dons	Undisclosed	
3 February 2025	LW	(England) Marcus Ifill	(England) Brighton & Hove Albion	Undisclosed	
4 February 2025	RW	(England) Harry McKirdy	(Scotland) Hibernian	Free transfer	

=== Out ===
Date	Pos.	Player	To	Fee	Ref.
30 June 2024	CF	(England) Adam Marriott	(England) Boston United	Free transfer	
30 June 2024	RW	(England) Todd Miller	(England) Wealdstone	Free transfer	
30 June 2024	CM	(England) Marcus Sablier	(England) Lewes	Free transfer	
30 June 2024	CM	(England) James Vennings	(England) Braintree Town	Free transfer	
30 June 2024	CB	(England) Cole Kpekawa	(England) Oxford City	Free transfer	
30 June 2024	AM	(Netherlands) Mitchel Bergkamp	(England) Welling United	Free transfer	
30 June 2024	LB	(England) Rhys Wyborn	(England) Whitehawk	Free transfer	
16 September 2024	CB	(England) Sam Woods	(England) AFC Croydon Athletic	Free transfer	
31 January 2025	CF	(England) Levi Amantchi	(England) Walsall	Undisclosed	
31 January 2025	CB	(England) Callum Reynolds	(England) Boreham Wood	Free transfer	
20 February 2025	RB	(England) Josh Passley	(England) Ebbsfleet United	Free transfer	

=== Loans in ===
Date	Pos.	Player	From	Date until	Ref.
19 July 2024	CB	(England) Kamarl Grant	(England) Millwall	End of Season (Note: On 16 January, Grant's loan from Millwall was extended until the end of season.)	
26 July 2024	RB	(England) Danny Imray	(England) Crystal Palace	End of Season	
2 August 2024	CM	(Wales) Cameron Congreve	(Wales) Swansea City	End of Season	
30 August 2024	CF	(Wales) Josh Thomas	(Wales) Swansea City	17 January 2025 (Note: On 17 January, Thomas was recalled to his parent club Swansea City.)	
30 August 2024	CM	(England) Ben Thompson	(England) Stevenage	9 January 2025 (Note: On 9 January, Thompson joined from Stevenage permanently.)	
31 January 2025	LW	(England) Adam Mayor	(England) Millwall	End of Season	
3 February 2025	CB	(Albania) Maldini Kacurri	(England) Arsenal	End of Season	

=== Loans out ===
Date	Pos.	Player	To	Date until	Ref.
15 August 2024	GK	(England) David Aziaya	(England) Salisbury	13 October 2024	
28 September 2024	CB	(England) Taylor Foran	(England) Southend United	28 October 2024	
13 October 2024	GK	(England) David Aziaya	(England) Dartford	13 November 2024	
8 November 2024	CB	(England) Taylor Foran	(England) Kidderminster Harriers	1 January 2025	
12 November 2024	LW	(Antigua and Barbuda) Myles Weston	(England) Hornchurch	End of Season (Note: On 3 February, Weston's loan at Hornchurch was extended until the end of season.)	
22 November 2024	LB	(Kosovo) Besart Topalloj	(England) Sutton United	1 February 2025	
30 November 2024	LW	(England) Soul Kader	(England) AFC Croydon Athletic	28 December 2024	
7 December 2024	CM	(England) Callum Corbin	(England) South Park	4 January 2025	
7 December 2024	LB	(Antigua and Barbuda) Antonio Morgan	(England) South Park	4 January 2025	
14 December 2024	CB	(England) Frankie Moralee	(England) Cray Wanderers	11 January 2025	
14 December 2024	CM	(England) George Penn	(England) Cray Wanderers	End of Season (Note: On 8 February, Penn's loan at Cray Wanderers was extended until the end of season.)	
18 January 2025	CB	(England) Taylor Foran	(England) Chesham United	End of Season	
6 January 2025	LW	(England) Soul Kader	(England) Carshalton Athletic	3 February 2025	
6 January 2025	RB	(England) Nathan Paul-Lavaly	(England) Carshalton Athletic	3 February 2025	
4 February 2025	RB	(England) Josh Passley	(England) Ebbsfleet United	20 February 2025 (Note: On 20 February, Passley's loan at Ebbsfleet United was made permanent.)	
8 February 2025	CF	(England) Soul Kader	(England) Cray Wanderers	End of Season	
4 March 2025	DM	(England) Lewis Leigh	(England) FC Halifax Town	End of Season	

== Pre-season and friendlies ==
On 21 June 2024, Bromley announced their pre-season schedule with six matches scheduled against Hornchurch, Crystal Palace U21 (behind closed doors, later cancelled), Tonbridge Angels, Brighton & Hove Albion U21 (behind closed doors), Braintree Town and Aldershot Town along with a six-day pre-season training camp in Portugal.

Win Draw Loss Fixtures

9 July 2024 Friendly	Millwall	0–0	Bromley	Bromley, England
14:00 BST		Report		Stadium: Millwall Football Club Training Ground; Attendance: 0 (behind closed doors)

13 July 2024 Friendly	Hornchurch	1–5	Bromley	Upminster, England
15:00 BST	Trialist 1'	Report	Elerewe 55'; Olomola 59'; Amantchi (?); Arthurs 85'; Paul-Lavaly 90'	Stadium: Hornchurch Stadium

16 July 2024 Friendly	Tonbridge Angels	2–3	Bromley	Tonbridge, England
19:45 BST	Tyrie 31'; Trialist 85'	Report	Amantchi 60'; Leigh 62'; Trailist 68'	Stadium: Longmead Stadium

23 July 2024 Friendly	Bristol Rovers	1–2	Bromley	Parchal, Portugal
10:00 WEST	Lawrence 85'	Report	Woods 3'; Amantchi 30'	Stadium: Estádio Municipal Bela Vista

27 July 2024 Friendly	Brighton & Hove Albion U21	1–4	Bromley	Lancing, England
14:00 BST	Trialist (?)	Report	Cheek (?); Trialist (?); Trialist (?)	Stadium: American Express Elite Football Performance Centre; Attendance: 0 (behind closed doors)

30 July 2024 Friendly	Braintree Town	0–1	Bromley	Braintree, England
19:45 BST		Report	Cheek 63'	Stadium: Cressing Road

3 August 2024 Friendly	Aldershot Town	1–0	Bromley	Aldershot, England
15:00 BST	Vaughan 78'	Report		Stadium: Recreation Ground

== Competitions ==
=== Overall record ===
Competition	First match	Last match	Starting round	Final position	Record							
Competition	First match	Last match	Starting round	Final position	Pld	W	D	L	GF	GA	GD	Win %
EFL League Two	10 August 2024	3 May 2025	Matchday 1	11th	46	17	15	14	64	59	+5	36.96
FA Cup	2 November 2024	12 January 2025	First round	Third round	3	2	0	1	7	7	+0	66.67
EFL Cup	13 August 2024		First round	First round	1	0	0	1	1	2	−1	0.00
EFL Trophy	2 September 2024	12 November 2024	Group stage	Group stage	3	0	1	2	5	7	−2	0.00
Total					53	19	16	18	77	75	+2	35.85

Last updated: 3 May 2025
Source: Soccerway

=== EFL League Two ===
==== League table ====
Pos	Team	Pld	W	D	L	GF	GA	GD	Pts
9	Grimsby Town	46	20	8	18	61	67	−6	68
10	Colchester United	46	16	19	11	52	47	+5	67
11	Bromley	46	17	15	14	64	59	+5	66
12	Swindon Town	46	15	17	14	71	63	+8	62
13	Crewe Alexandra	46	15	17	14	49	48	+1	62

Source: EFL Official Website
Rules for classification: 1) Points; 2) Goal difference; 3) Number of goals scored; 4) Head-to-head results; 5) Wins; 6) Away goals; 7) Penalty points (sec 9.5); 8) 12-point sending off offences

==== Results summary ====
Overall								Home						Away					
Pld	W	D	L	GF	GA	GD	Pts	W	D	L	GF	GA	GD	W	D	L	GF	GA	GD
46	17	15	14	64	59	+5	66	9	7	7	35	26	+9	8	8	7	29	33	−4

Last updated: 3 May 2025.
Source: Soccerway

==== Results by round ====
Round	1	2	3	4	5	6	7	8	9	10	12	13	14	15	16	11^{1}	18	19	20	21	22	23	24	25	27	28	29	30	17^{2}	31	32	33	26^{3}	34	35	36	37	38	39	40	41	42	43	44	45	46
Ground	A	H	A	H	A	H	A	H	H	A	H	A	H	A	H	A	H	A	H	A	H	H	A	A	H	A	A	H	A	A	H	H	H	A	H	A	H	A	H	A	H	A	H	A	A	H
Result	W	W	L	L	D	L	L	D	D	D	L	W	D	D	D	D	W	W	D	W	W	D	W	L	L	D	L	L	D	W	W	W	L	W	W	L	D	L	L	D	W	L	W	W	D	W
Position	4	3	7	10	11	15	18	18	19	19	22	19	18	19	20	19	19	14	14	13	12	12	11	12	11	11	13	16	16	13	11	10	10	10	9	10	11	12	13	13	12	14	13	12	11	11
Points	3	6	6	6	7	7	7	8	9	10	10	13	14	15	16	17	20	23	24	27	30	31	34	34	34	35	35	35	36	39	42	45	45	48	51	51	52	52	52	53	56	56	59	62	63	66

Source: EFL
A = Away; H = Home; W = Win; D = Draw; L = Loss; P = Postponed
Notes:
- ^{1} Matchday 11 (v. Walsall) was postponed due to international call-ups.
- ^{2} Matchday 17 (v. Salford City) was postponed due to a waterlogged pitch.
- ^{3} Matchday 26 (v. Bradford City) was postponed due to Bromley's participation in the FA Cup third round.

==== Matches ====
The league fixtures were released on 26 June 2024.

Win Draw Loss Fixtures

10 August 2024 1	Harrogate Town	0–2	Bromley	Harrogate
15:00 BST	O'Connor (yellow card) 32'	Report	Cheek (yellow card) 39', (goal) 62'; Grant 71'; Whitely (yellow card) 77'; Charles (yellow card) 88'; Imray (yellow card) 90+5'	Stadium: Wetherby Road; Attendance: 2,236; Referee: Thomas Parsons

17 August 2024 2	Bromley	2–0	AFC Wimbledon	Bromley
12:30 BST	Cheek 35'; Charles (yellow card) 56'; Whitely 60'	Report	Ball (yellow card) 37'; Neufville (yellow card) 90+1'; Smith (yellow card) 90+4'	Stadium: Hayes Lane; Attendance: 4,102; Referee: Will Finnie
Note: Fixture was initially scheduled for a 15:00 kick-off, but was moved for live Sky Sports broadcast.

24 August 2024 3	Bradford City	3–1	Bromley	Bradford
15:00 BST	Smallwood 9' (pen.), (yellow card) 49'; Cook 41'; Pointon (yellow card) 64', (goal) 79'	Report	Charles (red card) 8'; Grant (yellow card) 55'; Webster 86'	Stadium: Valley Parade; Attendance: 16,001; Referee: Scott Simpson

31 August 2024 4	Bromley	1–2	Crewe Alexandra	Bromley
15:00 BST	Leigh 2'; Thompson (yellow card) 78'; Reynolds (yellow card) 81'	Report	Tracey (yellow card) 45'; Demetriou 83'; Long 90+1'; Sanders (yellow card) 90+2'	Stadium: Hayes Lane; Attendance: 3,322; Referee: Scott Jackson

7 September 2024 5	Colchester United	1–1	Bromley	Colchester
15:00 BST	Iandolo (yellow card) 22'; Egbo (yellow card) 52'; Edwards 60', (yellow card) 63'	Report	Topalloj (yellow card) 3' (yellow-red card) 90+6'; Cheek 23' (pen.), (yellow card) 27'; Odutayo (yellow card) 48'; Thompson (yellow card) 90+5'	Stadium: Colchester Community Stadium; Attendance: 4,877; Referee: Sam Purkiss

14 September 2024 6	Bromley	2–4	Notts County	Bromley
15:00 BST	Cheek 4', (yellow card) 90+4'; Thompson 6'; Leigh (yellow card) 71'	Report	Jones 13' (pen.), 89', (yellow card) 45+1'; Crowley 47'; Jatta 56'	Stadium: Hayes Lane; Attendance: 3,322; Referee: Charles Breakspear

21 September 2024 7	Grimsby Town	1–0	Bromley	Cleethorpes
15:00 BST	Green (yellow card) 38' (yellow-red card) 85'; Rose 51' (pen.); Svanþórsson (yellow card) 79'; McEachran (yellow card) 90'	Report	Odutayo (yellow card) 32'	Stadium: Blundell Park; Attendance: 6,115; Referee: Tom Reeves

28 September 2024 8	Bromley	1–1	Milton Keynes Dons	Bromley
15:00 BST	Cheek 23'; Grant (yellow card) 45+2'; Whitely (yellow card) 90+2'	Report	Tomlinson 8'; Leigh (yellow card) 53'	Stadium: Hayes Lane; Attendance: 3,522; Referee: Lee Swabey

1 October 2024 9	Bromley	2–2	Chesterfield	Bromley
19:45 BST	Olomola 14'; Cheek 50'	Report	Grigg 19', 37'; Metcalfe (yellow card) 89'	Stadium: Hayes Lane; Attendance: 2,057; Referee: Craig Hicks

5 October 2024 10	Fleetwood Town	0–0	Bromley	Fleetwood
12:30 BST		Report	Sowunmi (yellow card) 59'	Stadium: Highbury Stadium; Attendance: 2,605; Referee: Martin Coy
Note: Fixture was initially scheduled for a 15:00 kick-off, but was moved for live Sky Sports broadcast.

19 October 2024 12	Bromley	1–2	Tranmere Rovers	Bromley
15:00 BST	Olomola (yellow card) 19'; Dennis 90+6'	Report	Finley (yellow card) 18'; McGee (yellow card) 24'; Jennings (yellow card) 28'; Norris (yellow card) 33'; Bradshaw (yellow card) 62'; Patrick 75'; Saunders 80'	Stadium: Hayes Lane; Attendance: 3,376; Referee: Scott Tallis

22 October 2024 13	Doncaster Rovers	0–1	Bromley	Doncaster
19:45 BST	Sharp (yellow card) 90'	Report	Thompson 20'; Grant (yellow card) 42'; Imray (yellow card) 45+3'; Odutayo (yellow card) 71'; Jenkinson (yellow card) 80'; Smith (yellow card) 90+5'	Stadium: Eco-Power Stadium; Attendance: 6,309; Referee: Zac Kennard-Kettle

26 October 2024 14	Bromley	1–1	Barrow	Bromley
15:00 BST	Thompson (yellow card) 47'; Grant (yellow card) 84'; Cheek 90+1' (pen.)	Report	Kouyaté (yellow card) 17'; Garner 21', (yellow card) 85'; Feely (yellow card) 85'; Stokes (yellow card) 86'; Daniels (yellow card) 88'	Stadium: Hayes Lane; Attendance: 3,406; Referee: Daniel Middleton

9 November 2024 15	Cheltenham Town	1–1	Bromley	Cheltenham
15:00 GMT	Archer 50'	Report	Jenkinson (yellow card) 12' (yellow-red card) 24'; Arthurs (yellow card) 71'; Sowunmi 82'	Stadium: Whaddon Road; Attendance: 3,786; Referee: Scott Oldham

16 November 2024 16	Bromley	1–1	Carlisle United	Bromley
15:00 GMT	Cheek 54' (pen.); Thompson (yellow card) 57'; Leigh (red card) 83'	Report	Guy (yellow card) 37'; Mellish (yellow card) 43'; Burey (yellow card) 51'; Charters (yellow card) 67'; Lavelle (yellow card) 83'; Sadi (yellow card) 90'; Adu-Adjei 90+2'; Barclay (yellow card) 90+7'	Stadium: Hayes Lane; Attendance: 3,741; Referee: James Durkin

26 November 2024 11	Walsall	2–2	Bromley	Walsall
19:45 GMT	L. Gordon 40'; Okagbue 90+4'	Report	Cheek 59'; Webster (yellow card) 74'; Imray 77'	Stadium: Bescot Stadium; Attendance: 4,424; Referee: Michael Barlow
Note: Fixture was initially scheduled for 12 October, but was postponed due to international call-ups on both sides.

4 December 2024 18	Bromley	2–1	Gillingham	Bromley
19:45 GMT	Congreve 54'; Thompson (yellow card) 65'; Arthurs 71'	Report	McKenzie 56'; Andrews (yellow card) 90+1'	Stadium: Hayes Lane; Attendance: 3,438; Referee: Alex Chilowicz
Note: Fixture was initially scheduled for 3 December, but was moved due to Bromley's participation in the FA Cup on the preceding Sunday.

7 December 2024 19	Accrington Stanley	1–2	Bromley	Accrington
15:00 GMT	B. Woods 9', (yellow card) 75'; Coyle (yellow card) 23'	Report	Cheek 7'; Whitely (yellow card) 51'; Odutayo 63'; Smith (yellow card) 85'; Imray (yellow card) 90+2'	Stadium: Crown Ground; Attendance: 1,816; Referee: Martin Coy

14 December 2024 20	Bromley	0–0	Port Vale	Bromley
15:00 GMT		Report	Croasdale (yellow card) 90+2'	Stadium: Hayes Lane; Attendance: 3,697; Referee: Jacob Miles

21 December 2024 21	Morecambe	0–2	Bromley	Morecambe
15:00 GMT	Tutonda (yellow card) 39'	Report	Sowunmi 19'; Cheek 84' (pen.), (yellow card) 85'	Stadium: Mazuma Mobile Stadium; Attendance: 3,515; Referee: Steven Copeland

26 December 2024 22	Bromley	5–2	Newport County	Bromley
19:45 GMT	Sowunmi 27'; Reynolds 35'; Cheek 53'; Arthurs 70'; Thompson 90+3'	Report	K. Evans 72'; Whitmore 79'	Stadium: Hayes Lane; Attendance: 3,320; Referee: Sunny Singh Gill

29 December 2024 23	Bromley	1–1	Swindon Town	Bromley
12:30 GMT	Sowunmi 69', (yellow card) 85'; Grant (yellow card) 80'	Report	Ofoborh (yellow card) 20'; Kilkenny (yellow card) 28'; Longelo (yellow card) 38', (goal) 72'; Clarke (yellow card) 67'	Stadium: Hayes Lane; Attendance: 3,833; Referee: Zac Kennard-Kettle
Note: Fixture was initially scheduled for a 15:00 kick-off, but was moved for live Sky Sports broadcast.

2 January 2025 24	Gillingham	0–3	Bromley	Gillingham
19:45 GMT	Little (yellow card) 53'; Nevitt (penalty missed) 88'; Gbode (yellow card) 90+5'	Report	Dennis 7'; Arthurs 26'; Grant 76'; Sowunmi (yellow card) 89'; Olomola (yellow card) 90+5'	Stadium: Priestfield Stadium; Attendance: 7,454; Referee: Ben Atkinson
Note: Fixture was initially scheduled for 1 January, but was moved following an agreement between the two sides.

5 January 2025 25	Crewe Alexandra	4–1	Bromley	Crewe
15:00 GMT	Bogle 28', 32'; Lankester 38'; Billington (yellow card) 55'; Cooney (yellow card) 74'; Knight-Lebel 82'	Report	Cheek 36' (pen.); Smith (yellow card) 51'; Grant (yellow card) 75' (yellow-red card) 79'; Sowunmi (yellow card) 82'	Stadium: Gresty Road; Attendance: 4,462; Referee: Scott Jackson
Note: Fixture was initially scheduled for 4 January, but was moved due to Bromley playing on the preceding Thursday.

18 January 2025 27	Bromley	0–1	Colchester United	Bromley
15:00 GMT	Sowunmi (yellow card) 90+1'; Imray (yellow card) 90+4'	Report	Edwards 4'; Flanagan (yellow card) 90+3'; Iandolo (yellow card) 90+4'	Stadium: Hayes Lane; Attendance: 3,907; Referee: Greg Rollason

25 January 2025 28	Notts County	1–1	Bromley	Nottingham
15:00 GMT	Platt (yellow card) 41'; Jones 56' (pen.); Hinchy (yellow card) 63'	Report	Thompson (yellow card) 29'; Congreve 80'	Stadium: Meadow Lane; Attendance: 9,947; Referee: Stephen Parkinson

28 January 2025 29	Chesterfield	3–0	Bromley	Chesterfield
19:45 GMT	Dobra 36'; Colclough 82'; Madden 90+1'	Report	Sowunmi (red card) 23'	Stadium: SMH Group Stadium; Attendance: 7,192; Referee: Ollie Yates

1 February 2025 30	Bromley	0–2	Grimsby Town	Bromley
15:00 GMT	Thompson (yellow card) 8'	Report	Thompson (yellow card) 5'; Rose (yellow card) 31', (goal) 46'; Obikwu 70'; Svanþórsson (yellow card) 77'; Hume (yellow card) 86'; Cass (yellow card) 90+6' (yellow-red card) 90+6'	Stadium: Hayes Lane; Attendance: 3,857; Referee: Sam Mulhall

4 February 2025 17	Salford City	3–3	Bromley	Salford
19:45 GMT	Warrington 62', (yellow card) 82'; Lund 77'; Stockton 90+2'	Report	Congreve 13', 51'; Mayor (yellow card) 16'; Cheek 38'; Imray (yellow card) 45+1'; Arthurs (yellow card) 90+5'	Stadium: Moor Lane; Attendance: 2,112; Referee: Simon Mather
Note: Fixture was initially scheduled for 23 November, but was postponed due to a waterlogged pitch.

8 February 2025 31	Milton Keynes Dons	0–1	Bromley	Milton Keynes
19:45 GMT	Tomlinson (yellow card) 28'; Lemonheigh-Evans (yellow card) 31'; Crowley (yellow card) 51'; Williams (yellow card) 78'; O'Reilly (yellow card) 90+9'	Report	Mayor (yellow card) 47'; Cheek (penalty missed) 51'; Thompson 60'	Stadium: Stadium MK; Attendance: 6,972; Referee: James Durkin

15 February 2025 32	Bromley	1–0	Fleetwood Town	Bromley
15:00 GMT	Cheek 46', (yellow card) 78'	Report	Rooney (yellow card) 25'; Potter (yellow card) 90'	Stadium: Hayes Lane; Attendance: 2,474; Referee: Matthew Russell

22 February 2025 33	Bromley	2–0	Harrogate Town	Bromley
15:00 GMT	Cheek 30'; Arthurs 45'	Report	Moon (yellow card) 51'; Fox (yellow card) 87'; Hill (yellow card) 90+1'	Stadium: Hayes Lane; Attendance: 2,518; Referee: James Oldham

25 February 2025 26	Bromley	0–1	Bradford City	Bromley
19:45 GMT	Mayor (yellow card) 67'; Cheek (yellow card) 84'; Elerewe (yellow card) 88'	Report	Pointon 82', (yellow card) 83'; Baldwin (yellow card) 90+4'	Stadium: Hayes Lane; Attendance: 2,442; Referee: Jamie O'Connor
Note: Fixture was initially scheduled for 11 January, but was postponed due to Bromley's participation in the FA Cup third round.

1 March 2025 34	AFC Wimbledon	0–1	Bromley	Wimbledon
15:00 GMT	Smith (yellow card) 32'	Report	Arthurs (yellow card) 60'; Whitely 76'; Smith (yellow card) 86'	Stadium: Plough Lane; Attendance: 8,519; Referee: Gareth Rhodes

4 March 2025 35	Bromley	1–0	Doncaster Rovers	Bromley
19:45 GMT	Elerewe 10', (yellow card) 58'; Jenkinson (yellow card) 90+7'	Report	Broadbent (yellow card) 9'; Street (yellow card) 17'; Clifton (yellow card) 19'	Stadium: Hayes Lane; Attendance: 2,433; Referee: Bobby Madley

8 March 2025 36	Tranmere Rovers	2–1	Bromley	Birkenhead
15:00 GMT	Hawkes 32'; Patrick 70'; Saunders (yellow card) 90+2'; McGee (yellow card) 90+6'	Report	Cheek 27'; Webster (yellow card) 90+2'; Kabamba (yellow card) 90+4'	Stadium: Prenton Park; Attendance: 5,615; Referee: Sam Mulhall

13 March 2025 37	Bromley	2–2	Walsall	Bromley
20:00 GMT	Thompson 7'; Charles (yellow card) 41'; McKirdy 55'	Report	Okagbue (yellow card) 28'; Matt (yellow card) 40', (goal) 70'; Amantchi 45+1'; Barrett (yellow card) 81'	Stadium: Hayes Lane; Attendance: 2,512; Referee: Ruebyn Ricardo
Note: Fixture was initially scheduled for 15 March, but was moved for live Sky Sports broadcast.

22 March 2025 38	Carlisle United	2–1	Bromley	Carlisle
15:00 GMT	Wearne 13'; Harris (penalty missed) 48'; Whelan 54'; Davies (yellow card) 56'; Harper (yellow card) 62'; Vela (yellow card) 69'; Bevan (yellow card) 90+4'	Report	McKirdy 28', (yellow card) 28'; Webster (yellow card) 47'; Mayor (yellow card) 69'	Stadium: Brunton Park; Attendance: 6,515; Referee: Bobby Madley

29 March 2025 39	Bromley	2–3	Salford City	Bromley
15:00 GMT	Ashley 8' (o.g.); Smith (yellow card) 34'; Cheek 74', (yellow card) 90+2'	Report	Ashley (yellow card) 7'; Stockton 16', 62'; N'Mai 28', (yellow card) 72'; Lund (yellow card) 87'	Stadium: Hayes Lane; Attendance: 2,658; Referee: Aaron Bannister

1 April 2025 40	Newport County	1–1	Bromley	Newport
19:45 BST	C. Evans 32'; Glennon (yellow card) 57'; K. Evans (yellow card) 74'	Report	Cheek 72'	Stadium: Rodney Parade; Attendance: 3,465; Referee: Robert Massey-Ellis

5 April 2025 41	Bromley	4–0	Accrington Stanley	Bromley
15:00 BST	Congreve 29'; Cheek 56' (pen.), 76' (pen.); Arthurs (yellow card) 60'; Grant (yellow card) 64'; Thompson 69'	Report	Ward (yellow card) 28'	Stadium: Hayes Lane; Attendance: 2,410; Referee: Alan Young

12 April 2025 42	Port Vale	5–0	Bromley	Stoke-on-Trent
15:00 BST	Shorrock 5'; Tolaj 28', 68'; Croasdale (yellow card) 54', (goal) 82'; Byers 66'	Report	Cheek (yellow card) 10'; Grant (yellow card) 33'; Sowunmi (yellow card) 53'; Charles (yellow card) 58'; Webster (yellow card) 79'; Arthurs (yellow card) 85'; Thompson (yellow card) 87'	Stadium: Vale Park; Attendance: 10,864; Referee: Abigail Byrne

18 April 2025 43	Bromley	1–0	Morecambe	Bromley
15:00 BST	Cheek 48' (pen.); Sowunmi (yellow card) 63'; Charles (yellow card) 82'	Report	Tutonda (yellow card) 66' (yellow-red card) 68'; Songo'o (yellow card) 67'; P. Lewis (yellow card) 78'	Stadium: Hayes Lane; Attendance: 2,382; Referee: Declan Bourne

21 April 2025 44	Swindon Town	0–1	Bromley	Swindon
15:00 BST	Tshimanga (penalty missed) 45'	Report	Arthurs (yellow card) 21'; Mayor (yellow card) 25'; Whitely (yellow card) 66'; Wright 88' (o.g.)	Stadium: County Ground; Attendance: 8,884; Referee: William Davis

26 April 2025 45	Barrow	3–3	Bromley	Barrow-in-Furness
15:00 BST	Whitfield 42' (pen.); Pressley (yellow card) 46'; Fletcher 53'; Williams (yellow card) 71'; Newby 85'; Vassell (yellow card) 90+4'	Report	Imray (yellow card) 19'; Charles (yellow card) 41'; Cheek 50'; Kabamba 75'; Sowunmi 90+1'; Elerewe (yellow card) 90+2'	Stadium: Holker Street; Attendance: 3,137; Referee: Oliver Mackey

3 May 2025 46	Bromley	3–0	Cheltenham Town	Bromley
15:00 BST	Cheek 26' (pen.), 53'; Kabamba 45+3'; Kader (yellow card) 89'	Report	Backwell (yellow card) 24'; Thomas (yellow card) 59'; Archer (yellow card) 90+5'	Stadium: Hayes Lane; Attendance: 2,818; Referee: Stephen Parkinson

=== FA Cup ===
As a League Two side, Bromley entered the FA Cup in the first round, and were drawn away to National League side Rochdale. In the second round, they were drawn away to National League side Solihull Moors. They were then drawn away to Premier League side Newcastle United in the third round.

Win Draw Loss Fixtures

2 November 2024 First round	Rochdale	3–4	Bromley	Rochdale
15:00 GMT	Beckwith 24', (yellow card) 87'; Webster 52' (o.g.); Hogan (yellow card) 67'; Henderson 80'	Report	Whitely 1', 90+2'; Cheek 3'; Webster (yellow card) 49'; Imray (yellow card) 64' (yellow-red card) 90+3'; Amantchi 90+1'	Stadium: Spotland Stadium; Attendance: 2,329; Referee: Aaron Bannister

1 December 2024 Second round	Solihull Moors	1–2	Bromley	Solihull
15:15 GMT	Wilkinson 12'; Tipton (yellow card) 52'; Howell (yellow card) 74'; Oakley (yellow card) 77'; Morrison (yellow card) 89'	Report	Sowunmi 15'; Imray 61'	Stadium: Damson Park; Attendance: 1,770; Referee: Matthew Russell

12 January 2025 Third round	Newcastle United	3–1	Bromley	Newcastle upon Tyne
15:00 GMT	Miley 16'; Gordon 49' (pen.); Osula 61'	Report	Congreve 8'	Stadium: St James' Park; Attendance: 52,088; Referee: Will Finnie

=== EFL Cup ===
As a League Two side, Bromley entered the EFL Cup in the first round, and were drawn at home against fellow League Two side AFC Wimbledon.

Win Draw Loss Fixtures

13 August 2024 First round	Bromley	1–2	AFC Wimbledon	Bromley
19:45 BST	Amantchi 19'	Report	Kelly 24'; Reeves (yellow card) 58'; Pigott 61'; Hippolyte (yellow card) 62'; Johnson (yellow card) 83'; Maycock (yellow card) 89'	Stadium: Hayes Lane; Attendance: 3,677; Referee: Carl Brook

=== EFL Trophy ===
==== Group stage ====
In the group stage, Bromley were drawn into Southern Group C alongside Cambridge United, Charlton Athletic and Chelsea U21.

Pos	Div	Team	Pld	W	PW	PL	L	GF	GA	GD	Pts	Qualification
1	L1	Charlton Athletic	3	3	0	0	0	6	1	+5	9	Advance to Round 2
2	L1	Cambridge United	3	1	0	1	1	5	5	0	4	Advance to Round 2
3	ACA	Chelsea U21	3	1	0	0	2	3	6	−3	3	
4	L2	Bromley	3	0	1	0	2	5	7	−2	2	

Source: EFL

Win Draw Loss Fixtures

3 September 2024 1	Bromley	3–3 (5–4 p)	Cambridge United	Bromley
19:45 BST	Dinanga 1', 23'; Sowunmi (yellow card) 78'; Olomola 90'	Report	Njoku (yellow card) 26'; Bennett 38'; Barton 60'; Longelo 68'	Stadium: Hayes Lane; Attendance: 1,120; Referee: James Durkin
	Penalties
	Arthurs (penalty scored); Charles (penalty scored); Topalloj (penalty scored); Odutayo (penalty scored); Olomola (penalty scored)		(penalty missed) Andrew; (penalty scored) Nlundulu; (penalty scored) Stokes; (penalty scored) Digby; (penalty scored) Okedina

24 September 2024 2	Bromley	2–3	Chelsea U21	Bromley
19:45 BST	Amantchi 6'; Odutayo (yellow card) 22'; Leigh (yellow card) 64'; Charles 81'	Report	McNeilly 3', (yellow card) 35'; Vale 27', 77'	Stadium: Hayes Lane; Attendance: 1,250; Referee: Matthew Russell

12 November 2024 3	Charlton Athletic	1–0	Bromley	Charlton
19:00 GMT	Asiimwe (yellow card) 12'; Gillesphey (yellow card) 47'; Leaburn 70'	Report	Reynolds (yellow card) 89'	Stadium: The Valley; Attendance: 2,916; Referee: Ben Atkinson

== Statistics ==
As of match played 3 May 2025

=== Appearances ===
Players with no appearances are not included on the list, italics indicate a loaned in player.

No.	Pos	Nat	Player	Total		League Two		FA Cup		EFL Cup		EFL Trophy	
No.	Pos	Nat	Player	Apps	Goals	Apps	Goals	Apps	Goals	Apps	Goals	Apps	Goals
1	GK	(England) ENG	Grant Smith	48	0	45+0	0	3+0	0	0+0	0	0+0	0
3	DF	(England) ENG	Deji Elerewe	18	1	17+0	1	1+0	0	0+0	0	0+0	0
4	MF	(Grenada) GRN	Ashley Charles	31	1	25+2	0	0+1	0	0+1	0	2+0	1
5	DF	(England) ENG	Omar Sowunmi	39	6	28+5	5	3+0	1	1+0	0	2+0	0
6	DF	(England) ENG	Carl Jenkinson	13	0	9+2	0	0+1	0	0+0	0	1+0	0
9	FW	(England) ENG	Michael Cheek	49	26	44+1	25	3+0	1	0+1	0	0+0	0
10	FW	(England) ENG	Marcus Dinanga	10	2	1+6	0	0+0	0	1+0	0	2+0	2
11	FW	(England) ENG	Louis Dennis	19	2	6+10	2	1+1	0	0+0	0	1+0	0
12	GK	(Scotland) SCO	Sam Long	5	0	1+0	0	0+0	0	1+0	0	3+0	0
13	FW	(England) ENG	Harry McKirdy	9	2	2+7	2	0+0	0	0+0	0	0+0	0
16	DF	(England) ENG	Kamarl Grant	44	2	34+6	2	2+0	0	1+0	0	0+1	0
17	DF	(England) ENG	Byron Webster	31	1	27+1	1	2+1	0	0+0	0	0+0	0
18	FW	(England) ENG	Corey Whitely	47	4	36+8	2	3+0	2	0+0	0	0+0	0
19	FW	(England) ENG	Marcus Ifill	6	0	0+6	0	0+0	0	0+0	0	0+0	0
20	MF	(England) ENG	Jude Arthurs	47	4	37+4	4	3+0	0	1+0	0	0+2	0
22	MF	(Wales) WAL	Cameron Congreve	47	6	32+8	5	1+2	1	1+0	0	3+0	0
24	FW	(England) ENG	Soul Kader	1	0	0+1	0	0+0	0	0+0	0	0+0	0
25	DF	(England) ENG	Danny Imray	43	2	37+2	1	3+0	1	0+0	0	1+0	0
26	FW	(England) ENG	Nicke Kabamba	18	2	3+15	2	0+0	0	0+0	0	0+0	0
29	FW	(England) ENG	Olufela Olomola	22	2	6+10	1	1+1	0	0+1	0	1+2	1
30	DF	(England) ENG	Idris Odutayo	39	1	32+1	1	3+0	0	0+1	0	2+0	0
31	DF	(England) ENG	Brooklyn Ilunga	17	0	4+13	0	0+0	0	0+0	0	0+0	0
32	MF	(England) ENG	Ben Thompson	45	6	38+4	6	3+0	0	0+0	0	0+0	0
34	DF	(England) ENG	Adam Mayor	17	0	15+2	0	0+0	0	0+0	0	0+0	0
35	DF	(Albania) ALB	Maldini Kacurri	2	0	1+1	0	0+0	0	0+0	0	0+0	0
37	MF	(England) ENG	Nathan Paul-Lavaly	6	0	0+3	0	0+0	0	1+0	0	0+2	0
41	FW	(England) ENG	George Evans	1	0	0+0	0	0+0	0	0+0	0	0+1	0
Player(s) who featured but departed the club on loan during the season:
8	MF	(England) ENG	Lewis Leigh	23	1	3+14	1	0+2	0	1+0	0	3+0	0
15	DF	(England) ENG	Taylor Foran	2	0	0+0	0	0+0	0	0+0	0	2+0	0
23	DF	(Kosovo) KOS	Besart Topalloj	7	0	2+1	0	0+0	0	1+0	0	3+0	0
27	MF	(England) ENG	Callum Corbin	1	0	0+0	0	0+0	0	0+0	0	0+1	0
36	MF	(England) ENG	George Penn	1	0	0+0	0	0+0	0	0+0	0	1+0	0
Player(s) who featured whilst on loan but returned to parent club during the season:
44	FW	(Wales) WAL	Josh Thomas	6	0	0+3	0	0+0	0	0+0	0	1+2	0
Player(s) who featured but departed the club permanently during the season:
2	DF	(England) ENG	Callum Reynolds	24	1	17+3	1	1+1	0	1+0	0	1+0	0
7	DF	(England) ENG	Josh Passley	6	0	1+3	0	0+1	0	0+0	0	1+0	0
19	FW	(England) ENG	Levi Amantchi	21	3	2+12	0	0+3	1	1+0	1	3+0	1

=== Goals ===
Rank	Pos.	No.	Player	League Two	FA Cup	EFL Cup	EFL Trophy	Total
1	FW	9	(England) Michael Cheek	25	1	0	0	26
2=	DF	5	(England) Omar Sowunmi	5	1	0	0	6
2=	MF	22	(Wales) Cameron Congreve	5	1	0	0	6
2=	MF	32	(England) Ben Thompson	6	0	0	0	6
5=	FW	18	(England) Corey Whitely	2	2	0	0	4
5=	MF	20	(England) Jude Arthurs	4	0	0	0	4
7	FW	19	(England) Levi Amantchi	0	1	1	1	3
8=	FW	10	(England) Marcus Dinanga	0	0	0	2	2
8=	FW	11	(England) Louis Dennis	2	0	0	0	2
8=	FW	13	(England) Harry McKirdy	2	0	0	0	2
8=	DF	16	(England) Kamarl Grant	2	0	0	0	2
8=	DF	25	(England) Danny Imray	1	1	0	0	2
8=	FW	26	(England) Nicke Kabamba	2	0	0	0	2
8=	FW	29	(England) Olufela Olomola	1	0	0	1	2
15=	DF	2	(England) Callum Reynolds	1	0	0	0	1
15=	DF	3	(England) Deji Elerewe	1	0	0	0	1
15=	MF	4	(Grenada) Ashley Charles	0	0	0	1	1
15=	MF	8	(England) Lewis Leigh	1	0	0	0	1
15=	DF	17	(England) Byron Webster	1	0	0	0	1
15=	DF	30	(England) Idris Odutayo	1	0	0	0	1
Own goals				2	0	0	0	2
Total				64	7	1	5	77

=== Clean sheets ===
No.	Player	League Two	FA Cup	EFL Cup	EFL Trophy	Total
1	(England) Grant Smith	16	0	0	0	16
Total		16	0	0	0	16

=== Disciplinary record ===
No.	Pos.	Player	League Two			FA Cup			EFL Cup			EFL Trophy			Total		
No.	Pos.	Player	Yellow card	(yellow card) (yellow-red card)	Red card	Yellow card	(yellow card) (yellow-red card)	Red card	Yellow card	(yellow card) (yellow-red card)	Red card	Yellow card	(yellow card) (yellow-red card)	Red card	Yellow card	(yellow card) (yellow-red card)	Red card
1	GK	(England) Grant Smith	5	0	0	0	0	0	0	0	0	0	0	0	5	0	0
2	DF	(England) Callum Reynolds	1	0	0	0	0	0	0	0	0	1	0	0	2	0	0
3	DF	(England) Deji Elerewe	3	0	0	0	0	0	0	0	0	0	0	0	3	0	0
4	MF	(Grenada) Ashley Charles	6	0	1	0	0	0	0	0	0	0	0	0	6	0	1
5	DF	(England) Omar Sowunmi	7	0	1	0	0	0	0	0	0	1	0	0	8	0	1
6	DF	(England) Carl Jenkinson	2	1	0	0	0	0	0	0	0	0	0	0	2	1	0
8	MF	(England) Lewis Leigh	1	0	1	0	0	0	0	0	0	1	0	0	2	0	1
9	FW	(England) Michael Cheek	8	0	0	0	0	0	0	0	0	0	0	0	8	0	0
13	FW	(England) Harry McKirdy	1	0	0	0	0	0	0	0	0	0	0	0	1	0	0
16	DF	(England) Kamarl Grant	7	1	0	0	0	0	0	0	0	0	0	0	7	1	0
17	DF	(England) Byron Webster	4	0	0	1	0	0	0	0	0	0	0	0	5	0	0
18	FW	(England) Corey Whitely	4	0	0	0	0	0	0	0	0	0	0	0	4	0	0
20	MF	(England) Jude Arthurs	6	0	0	0	0	0	0	0	0	0	0	0	6	0	0
23	DF	(Kosovo) Besart Topalloj	0	1	0	0	0	0	0	0	0	0	0	0	0	1	0
24	FW	(England) Soul Kader	1	0	0	0	0	0	0	0	0	0	0	0	1	0	0
25	DF	(England) Danny Imray	6	0	0	0	1	0	0	0	0	0	0	0	6	1	0
26	FW	(England) Nicke Kabamba	1	0	0	0	0	0	0	0	0	0	0	0	1	0	0
29	FW	(England) Olufela Olomola	2	0	0	0	0	0	0	0	0	0	0	0	2	0	0
30	DF	(England) Idris Odutayo	3	0	0	0	0	0	0	0	0	1	0	0	4	0	0
32	MF	(England) Ben Thompson	8	0	0	0	0	0	0	0	0	0	0	0	8	0	0
34	DF	(England) Adam Mayor	5	0	0	0	0	0	0	0	0	0	0	0	5	0	0
Total			80	3	3	1	1	0	0	0	0	4	0	0	85	4	3
