= Lewis Leigh (footballer) =

English footballer (born 2003)

Personal information
- Full name: Lewis Jack Leigh
- Date of birth: 5 December 2003 (age 22)
- Place of birth: Preston, England
- Height: 1.72 m (5 ft 8 in)
- Position: Midfielder

Youth career
- 2007–2014: Liverpool
- 2014–2021: Preston North End

Senior career*
| Years | Team | Apps | (Gls) |
| 2021–2024 | Preston North End | 1 | (0) |
| 2023–2024 | → Bromley (loan) | 13 | (0) |
| 2024 | → Crewe Alexandra (loan) | 14 | (0) |
| 2024-2025 | Bromley | 17 | (1) |
| 2025 | → FC Halifax Town (loan) | 7 | (0) |
- * Club domestic league appearances and goals as of 12:53, 25 June 2025 (UTC)

Lewis Jack Leigh (born 5 December 2003) is an English professional footballer who plays as a midfielder for Morecambe previously playing for EFL League Two club Bromley and Preston North End.

== Career ==
=== Preston North End ===
Leigh began playing football at the youth academy of Liverpool at the age of 3 and a half, and stayed there until the age of 14 when he moved to his local club Preston North End. He first made the bench with Preston North End in a EFL Championship match against Millwall in March 2021. In August 2021, he signed his first professional contract with the club until 2024. He made his professional debut with Preston North End in a 4–1 EFL Cup win over Huddersfield Town on 9 August 2022, coming on as a substitute in the 88th minute.

In September 2023, Leigh joined National League side Bromley on loan, making 13 appearances.

In January 2024, Leigh joined EFL League Two side Crewe Alexandra on loan to the end of the season, making his Crewe debut as a substitute in Crewe's 2–1 defeat of Swindon Town on 13 January 2024. After eight further substitute appearances, he made his first league start for Crewe in their 1–1 home draw against AFC Wimbledon on 23 March 2024.

=== Bromley ===
On 2 July 2024, Leigh re-joined Bromley, who had just been promoted to League Two, on a permanent deal for an undisclosed fee. Having made his debut as a late substitute at Harrogate Town where Bromley won their first EFL League Two match on 10 August, Leigh scored against his first senior goal in the side's 2–1 defeat by his former loan side Crewe at Hayes Lane on 31 August 2024.

On 4 March 2025, Leigh joined National League side FC Halifax Town on loan for the remainder of the season.

At the start of the 2026/27 season Lewis Leigh joined Morcambe ahead of their national league north campaign

== Playing style ==
A diminutive midfielder, Leigh plays in front of the defence and pulls the strings with his long-range passing and relentless tackling.

== Career statistics ==
As of end of 2024–25 season

Appearances and goals by club, season and competition
| Club | Season | League | | | FA Cup | | League Cup | | Other | | Total | |
| Club | Season | Division | Apps | Goals | Apps | Goals | Apps | Goals | Apps | Goals | Apps | Goals |
|---|---|---|---|---|---|---|---|---|---|---|---|---|
| Preston North End | 2022–23 | Championship | 1 | 0 | 0 | 0 | 2 | 0 | — | | 3 | 0 |
| Preston North End | 2023–24 | Championship | 0 | 0 | 0 | 0 | 1 | 0 | — | | 1 | 0 |
| Preston North End | Total | | 1 | 0 | 0 | 0 | 3 | 0 | 0 | 0 | 4 | 0 |
| Bromley (loan) | 2023–24 | National League | 13 | 0 | 0 | 0 | 0 | 0 | 0 | 0 | 13 | 0 |
| Crewe Alexandra (loan) | 2023–24 | League Two | 14 | 0 | 0 | 0 | 0 | 0 | 0 | 0 | 14 | 0 |
| Bromley | 2024–25 | League Two | 17 | 1 | 2 | 0 | 1 | 0 | 3 | 0 | 23 | 1 |
| FC Halifax Town (loan) | 2024–25 | National League | 7 | 0 | 0 | 0 | — | | 0 | 0 | 7 | 0 |
| Career total | | | 52 | 1 | 2 | 0 | 4 | 0 | 3 | 0 | 61 | 1 |
