= Danny Imray =

English footballer (born 2003)

Personal information
- Full name: Daniel Edward Peter Imray
- Date of birth: 27 July 2003 (age 23)
- Place of birth: Harold Wood, England
- Height: 1.78 m (5 ft 10 in)
- Positions: Right-back; right wing-back

Team information
- Current team: Wrexham
- Number: 30

Youth career
- Ilford
- Billericay Town
- 2019–2020: Chelmsford City

Senior career*
Years	Team	Apps	(Gls)
2020–2021	Chelmsford City	18	(0)
2021–2026	Crystal Palace	0	(0)
2022	→ Chelmsford City (loan)	14	(1)
2024–2025	→ Bromley (loan)	39	(1)
2025–2026	→ Blackpool (loan)	13	(2)
2026	→ West Bromwich Albion (loan)	16	(1)
2026–	Wrexham	2	(1)
- * Club domestic league appearances and goals as of 23 August 2026 (UTC)

Daniel Edward Peter Imray (born 27 July 2003) is an English professional footballer who plays as a right-back or right wing-back for EFL Championship club Wrexham.

== Career ==
=== Early career ===
After playing for Ilford and Billericay Town at youth level, Imray joined Chelmsford City in 2019, scoring 23 goals in 11 appearances at under-18 level, before earning a call-up to the senior side. On 4 February 2020, Imray made his debut for Chelmsford, at the age of 16, starting in a 2–0 loss against Concord Rangers in the Essex Senior Cup.

=== Crystal Palace ===
On 3 February 2021, Crystal Palace announced the signing of Imray, initially to play for their academy set-up.

==== Loan to Chelmsford City ====
On 31 January 2022, Imray returned to former club Chelmsford on loan until the end of the season. On 5 February 2022, he made his second debut for Chelmsford, scoring and winning a penalty in a 3–1 win at Dulwich Hamlet.

==== Loan to Bromley ====
On 26 July 2024, Imray signed for newly promoted EFL League Two side Bromley on a season-long loan deal. On 10 August 2024, he made his English Football League debut, coming on as a 24th-minute substitute in a 2–0 win at Harrogate Town. On 1 December 2024, he scored the winning goal in a 1–2 victory over Solihull Moors in an FA Cup second-round fixture.

==== Loan to Blackpool ====
On 15 July 2025, Imray joined League One side Blackpool on a season-long loan deal. He made his debut for the club on 23 August 2025, in a 1–0 defeat to Plymouth Argyle. He scored his first goal for the club on 10 December 2025, in a 3–0 win against Rotherham United. On 16 January 2026, Imray was recalled by Crystal Palace, following 16 appearances at Blackpool.

==== Loan to West Bromwich Albion ====
On 30 January 2026, Imray joined Championship side West Bromwich Albion on loan until the end of the season. He made his debut for the club on 31 January 2026, in a 3–0 defeat to Portsmouth. He scored his first goal for the club on 21 April 2026, in a 3–0 win against Watford.

=== Wrexham ===
On 29 July 2026, Wrexham announced the signing of Imray to a four-year deal.

== Personal life ==
Imray is of Trinidadian descent and thus is eligible for the Trinidad and Tobago national football team.

Imray's father, also called Danny, played semi-professional football, making three appearances for Romford in 1993.

== Career statistics ==
As of 7 August 2026

Appearances and goals by club, season and competition
Club	Season	League			FA Cup		League Cup		Other		Total	
Club	Season	Division	Apps	Goals	Apps	Goals	Apps	Goals	Apps	Goals	Apps	Goals
Chelmsford City	2019–20	National League South	6	0	0	0	—		0	0	6	0
Chelmsford City	2020–21	National League South	12	0	1	0	—		0	0	13	0
Chelmsford City	Total		18	0	1	0	0	0	0	0	19	0
Crystal Palace U21	2021–22	—			—		—		1 (Note: Appearance(s) in EFL Trophy)	0	1	0
Crystal Palace U21	2022–23	—			—		—		1	0	1	0
Crystal Palace U21	2023–24	—			—		—		3	0	3	0
Crystal Palace U21	2024–25	—			—		—		0	0	0	0
Crystal Palace U21	Total		—		—		—		5	0	5	0
Chelmsford City (loan)	2021–22	National League South	14	1	0	0	—		0	0	14	1
Bromley (loan)	2024–25	League Two	39	1	3	1	0	0	1	0	43	2
Blackpool (loan)	2025–26	League One	13	2	2	0	0	0	1	0	16	2
West Bromwich Albion (loan)	2025–26	Championship	16	1	1	0	0	0	—		17	1
Wrexham	2026–27	Championship	0	0	0	0	1	0	—		1	0
Career total			100	5	7	1	1	0	7	0	115	6
