= Taylor Foran =

English professional footballer

Personal information
- Full name: Taylor Christopher Foran
- Date of birth: 14 October 2003 (age 23)
- Place of birth: Hillingdon, England
- Height: 6 ft 3 in (1.91 m)
- Position: Defender

Team information
- Current team: Maidstone United
- Number: 24

Youth career
- 2012–2022: Arsenal

Senior career*
Years	Team	Apps	(Gls)
2022–2024	Arsenal	0	(0)
2023	→ Hartlepool United (loan)	11	(0)
2024–2026	Bromley	0	(0)
2024	→ Southend United (loan)	2	(0)
2024–2025	→ Kidderminster Harriers (loan)	3	(0)
2025	→ Chesham United (loan)	21	(0)
2025	→ Salisbury (loan)	6	(0)
2025	→ Maidstone United (loan)	6	(0)
2025–	Maidstone United	25	(1)
- * Club domestic league appearances and goals as of 12:34, 24 May 2026 (UTC)

Taylor Christopher Foran (born 14 October 2003) is an English professional footballer who plays as a defender for National League South side Maidstone United.

Foran began his career with Arsenal and captained the club's U18 side but did not make a senior appearance for the club. While at Arsenal, he signed on loan for League Two side Hartlepool United where he made 11 appearances. After leaving Arsenal, Foran signed for newly promoted League Two side Bromley in July 2024. He played for Bromley twice, both in cup competitions, and captained the club on both occasions. Whilst at Bromley, Foran spent time out on loan to non-league sides Southend United, Kidderminster Harriers, Chesham United, Salisbury and Maidstone United. In November 2025, his loan deal with Maidstone was made permanent with Foran signing an 18-month contract with the National League South side.

== Career ==
=== Arsenal ===
Born in Hillingdon, Foran joined Arsenal in May 2012 and turned professional in July 2022. He was captain of the Arsenal under-18 team, and spent time training with the Arsenal first-team.

Foran moved on loan to League Two side Hartlepool United in January 2023 until the end of the season.

Taylor was released by Arsenal at the end of the 2023–24 season following the expiration of his contract.

=== Bromley ===
He signed for newly promoted League Two side Bromley in July 2024. On 28 September 2024, Foran joined National League side Southend United on a 28-day loan. He made his debut for the club on the same day in a 3–1 home defeat against Gateshead.

On 8 November 2024, Foran was loaned to Kidderminster Harriers until January 2025. In January 2025, Foran joined National League South side Chesham United on a short-term loan deal – the loan was later extended until the end of the season.

In July 2025, Foran joined National League South side Salisbury on loan until January 2026. He made his debut for the club in the 0–0 draw away to Hampton & Richmond Borough on the opening day of the season. In October 2025, he had his loan with Salisbury terminated, joining divisional rivals Maidstone United on loan.

=== Maidstone United ===
After impressing with Maidstone during his loan spell and attracting interest from National League sides, Foran signed permanently for the club in November 2025 on an 18-month contract. During his loan spell, Foran made six appearances with the side only conceding once in that time. However, upon signing, Foran was ruled out for a few weeks due to an injury. He made his first appearance upon signing permanently on 20 December 2025 in a 0–0 draw away to Hampton & Richmond Borough.

== Personal life ==
Foran is of Anglo-Indian descent, through a grandfather. His father and sister are martial artists.

== Career statistics ==
As of match played 25 April 2026

Appearances and goals by club, season and competition
Club	Season	League			FA Cup		League Cup		Other		Total	
Club	Season	Division	Apps	Goals	Apps	Goals	Apps	Goals	Apps	Goals	Apps	Goals
Arsenal	2021–22	Premier League	0	0	0	0	0	0	2 (Note: Appearances in the EFL Trophy.)	0	2	0
Arsenal	2022–23	Premier League	0	0	0	0	0	0	4	0	4	0
Arsenal	2023–24	Premier League	0	0	0	0	0	0	3	0	3	0
Arsenal	Total		0	0	0	0	0	0	9	0	9	0
Hartlepool United (loan)	2022–23	League Two	11	0	0	0	0	0	0	0	11	0
Bromley	2024–25	League Two	0	0	0	0	0	0	2	0	2	0
Southend United (loan)	2024–25	National League	2	0	0	0	0	0	0	0	2	0
Kidderminster Harriers (loan)	2024–25	National League North	3	0	0	0	0	0	1	0	4	0
Chesham United (loan)	2024–25	National League South	21	0	0	0	0	0	0	0	21	0
Salisbury (loan)	2025–26	National League South	6	0	0	0	0	0	0	0	6	0
Maidstone United	2025–26	National League South	31	1	0	0	0	0	1	0	32	1
Career total			74	1	0	0	0	0	13	0	86	1
