= Callum Reynolds =

English footballer (born 1989)

Personal information
- Full name: Callum Frank Reynolds
- Date of birth: 10 November 1989 (age 37)
- Place of birth: Luton, England
- Height: 1.88 m (6 ft 2 in)
- Position: Defender

Team information
- Current team: Boreham Wood
- Number: 16

Youth career
- –2007: Rushden & Diamonds
- 2007–2008: Portsmouth

Senior career*
Years	Team	Apps	(Gls)
2008–2010	Portsmouth	0	(0)
2009	→ Basingstoke Town (loan)	8	(1)
2009	→ Luton Town (loan)	5	(0)
2010–2011	Basingstoke Town	29	(0)
2011–2012	Tamworth	3	(0)
2011	→ Hinckley United (loan)	5	(0)
2011	→ Corby Town (loan)	5	(0)
2012	→ Boreham Wood (loan)	11	(1)
2012–2016	Boreham Wood	142	(8)
2016–2018	Aldershot Town	83	(2)
2018–2020	Barnet	60	(2)
2020–2022	Dagenham & Redbridge	57	(2)
2022–2025	Bromley	97	(5)
2025–	Boreham Wood	46	(1)
- * Club domestic league appearances and goals as of 13:41, 3 May 2026 (UTC)

Callum Frank Reynolds (born 10 November 1989) is an English professional footballer who plays as a defender for National League side Boreham Wood.

== Early life ==
Reynolds was born in Luton, Bedfordshire, England.

== Career ==
Reynolds began his career at Rushden & Diamonds, prior to joining Portsmouth, followed by a loan spell with hometown club Luton Town in 2009. After leaving Portsmouth, he joined Basingstoke Town and then Tamworth. While at the latter, he was loaned to Hinckley United and Corby Town.

In March 2012, he joined Boreham Wood on loan, and signed permanently after the 2011–12 season. Named captain before the 2014–15 season, he led the team to its first promotion to the National League, defeating Whitehawk in the play-off final.

In July 2016, Reynolds joined Aldershot Town after a trial, and became captain shortly after. He left the club after the 2017–18 season, and in June 2018, signed a two-year contract with Barnet, where he was soon named captain.

Upon the expiration of his contract he left Barnet and, in August 2020, joined Dagenham & Redbridge. In June 2022, he likewise left Dagenham, and signed with Bromley. On May 5, 2024, he played in the 2024 National League play-off final as Bromley defeated Solihull Moors on penalties to earn promotion to the English Football League for the first time in the club's history. Following this, he signed a new contract with Bromley. On 26 December 2024, Reynolds scored his first goal in the English Football League during a 5–2 win against Newport County.

On 31 January 2025, Reynolds returned to National League South side Boreham Wood.

== Career statistics ==
As of match played 28 January 2025

Appearances and goals by club, season and competition
Club	Season	League			FA Cup		EFL Cup		Other		Total	
Club	Season	Division	Apps	Goals	Apps	Goals	Apps	Goals	Apps	Goals	Apps	Goals
Aldershot Town	2016–17	National League	44	0	1	0	—		3 (Note: One appearance in FA Trophy, two appearances in National League play-offs)	0	48	0
Aldershot Town	2017–18	National League	39	1	2	0	—		1 (Note: Appearance(s) in National League play-offs)	0	42	1
Aldershot Town	Total		83	1	3	0	0	0	4	0	90	1
Barnet	2018–19	National League	30	0	4	0	—		3 (Note: Appearance(s) in FA Trophy)	0	37	0
Barnet	2019–20	National League	30	2	3	0	—		4	0	37	2
Barnet	Total		60	2	7	0	0	0	7	0	74	2
Dagenham & Redbridge	2020–21	National League	21	1	0	0	—		2	0	23	1
Dagenham & Redbridge	2021–22	National League	36	1	2	0	—		4	0	42	1
Dagenham & Redbridge	Total		57	2	2	0	0	0	6	0	65	2
Bromley	2022–23	National League	39	1	0	0	—		3 (Note: One appearance in FA Trophy, two appearances in National League play-offs)	0	42	1
Bromley	2023–24	National League	38	3	0	0	—		6 (Note: Four appearances in FA Trophy, two appearances in National League play-offs)	0	44	3
Bromley	2024–25	League Two	20	1	2	0	1	0	1 (Note: Appearance(s) in EFL Trophy)	0	24	1
Total			97	5	2	0	1	0	10	0	110	5
Career total			297	10	14	0	1	0	27	0	339	10

== Honours ==
Boreham Wood

- Football Conference South play-offs: 2015
- National League South play-offs: 2025

National League League Cup winners 2025–26

Bromley

- National League play-offs: 2024
