= Ben Thompson (footballer, born 1995) =

English footballer

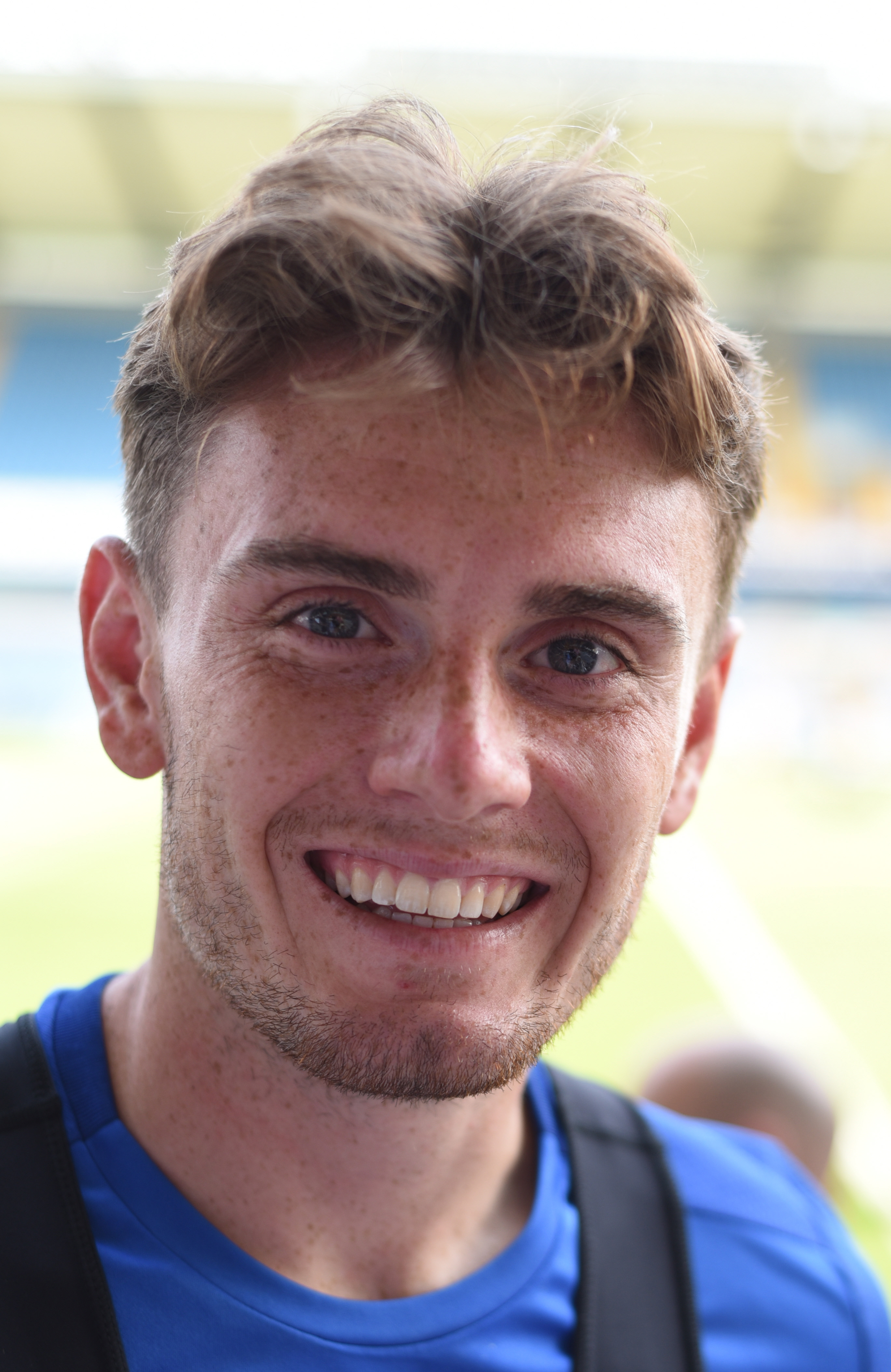
- Thompson in 2018

Personal information
- Full name: Ben Rhys Thompson
- Date of birth: 3 October 1995 (age 31)
- Place of birth: Sidcup, England
- Height: 5 ft 11 in (1.80 m)
- Position: Midfielder

Team information
- Current team: Bromley
- Number: 8

Youth career
- 2012–2014: Millwall

Senior career*
Years	Team	Apps	(Gls)
2014–2022	Millwall	142	(9)
2018–2019	→ Portsmouth (loan)	23	(2)
2022	Gillingham	17	(1)
2022–2023	Peterborough United	26	(1)
2023–2025	Stevenage	32	(2)
2024–2025	→ Bromley (loan)	20	(3)
2025–	Bromley	56	(11)
- * Club domestic league appearances and goals as of 13 May 2026 (UTC)

Ben Rhys Thompson (born 3 October 1995) is an English professional footballer who plays as a midfielder for EFL League One club Bromley.

== Early life ==
Thompson was born in Sidcup, south-east London.

== Career ==
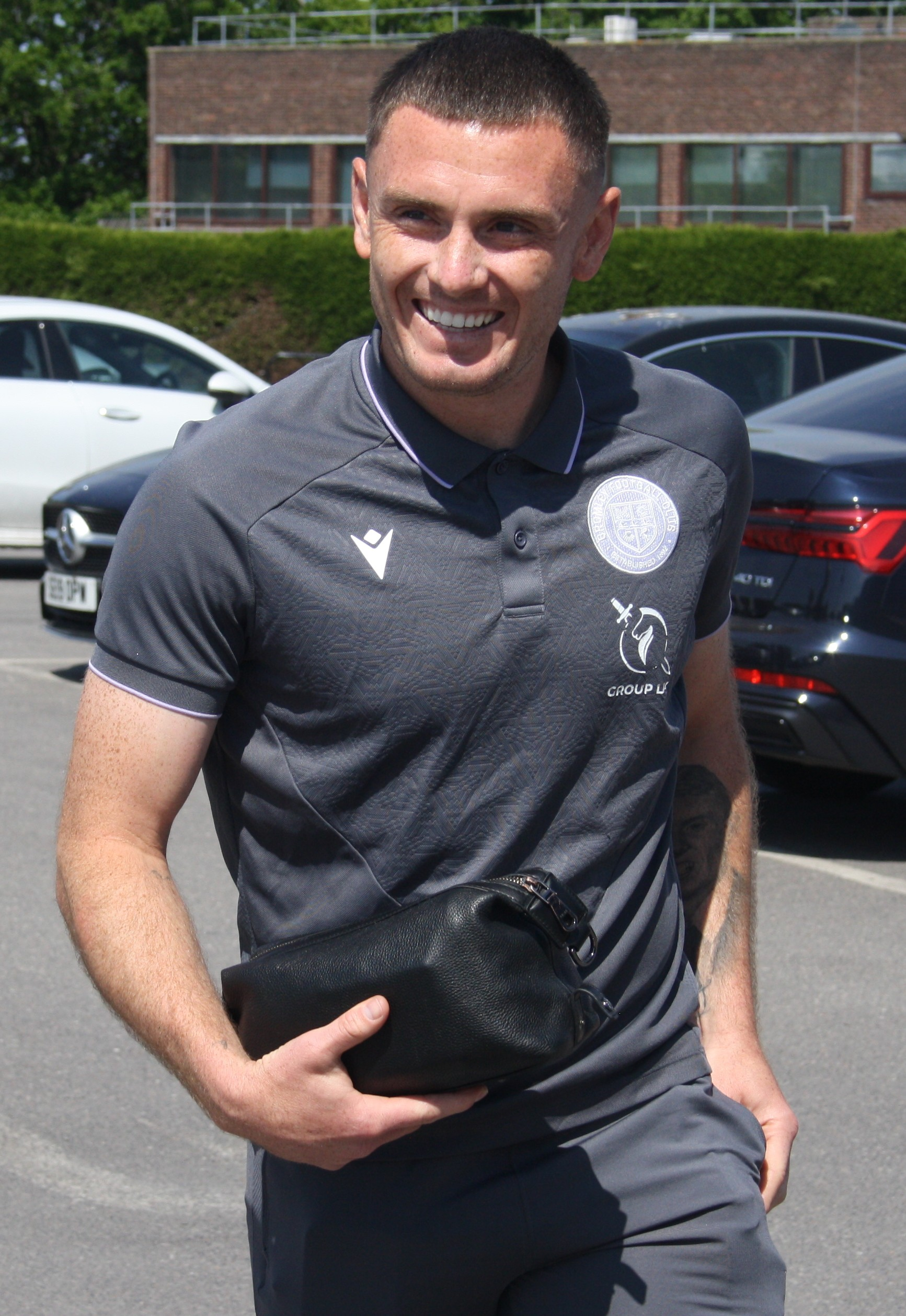
Thompson in 2026

=== Millwall ===
He made his senior debut for Millwall on 26 August 2014, as a 76th-minute substitute for Jimmy Abdou in a 0–2 home defeat to Southampton in the second round of the League Cup. He was also an unused substitute for the final two games of the 2014–15 Championship season, which ended in relegation to League One. Thompson scored his first Millwall goal against League Two side Wycombe Wanderers, scoring from an excellent effort 25 yards outside the box in a 1–2 FA Cup loss.

On 17 August 2018, Thompson joined EFL League One club Portsmouth on a season-long loan. Ben Thompson was recalled on 6 January 2019 back to his parent club Millwall.

With his playing time limited to just 5 appearances in the 2021–22 season on 31 January 2022 it was announced by Millwall that Thompson had cancelled his contract by mutual consent.

=== Gillingham ===
He immediately joined up with his former Millwall manager, Neil Harris, at EFL League One club Gillingham, signing a short-term contract until the end of the 2021–22 season. He made his debut for the Kent side in a 1–0 away league loss to Ipswich Town on 5 February 2022. Following the club's relegation at the end of the 2021–22 season, Thompson left the club.

=== Peterborough United ===
On 14 June 2022, Thompson signed for League One club Peterborough United on a two-year contract with an option for a third year. He scored his first goal for Peterborough in a 3–0 win against Morecambe

=== Stevenage ===
On 28 June 2023, Thompson signed for League One club Stevenage.

=== Bromley ===
Thompson was loaned out to Bromley on transfer deadline day in August 2024. On 9 January 2025, he joined the club permanently.

== Style of play ==
Thompson has been described by Neil Harris, who has managed him at Millwall and Gillingham, as a player with "ball carrying ability, tenaciousness and aggression".

== Career statistics ==
As of end of 2025–26 season

Appearances and goals by club, season and competition
Club	Season	League			FA Cup		League Cup		Other		Total	
Club	Season	Division	Apps	Goals	Apps	Goals	Apps	Goals	Apps	Goals	Apps	Goals
Millwall	2014–15	Championship	0	0	0	0	1	0	—		1	0
Millwall	2015–16	League One	28	1	2	1	0	0	6 (Note: Three appearances in the Football League Trophy and three in the League One play-offs)	0	36	2
Millwall	2016–17	League One	38	0	4	0	2	0	3 (Note: Appearance(s) in the EFL Trophy)	0	47	0
Millwall	2017–18	Championship	3	0	3	2	2	0	—		8	2
Millwall	2018–19	Championship	13	4	—		1	0	—		14	4
Millwall	2019–20	Championship	28	1	0	0	2	0	—		30	1
Millwall	2020–21	Championship	30	3	2	0	2	0	—		34	3
Millwall	2021–22	Championship	2	0	0	0	3	0	—		5	0
Millwall	Total		142	9	11	3	13	0	9	0	175	12
Portsmouth (loan)	2018–19	League One	23	2	3	1	—		1	0	27	3
Gillingham	2021–22	League One	17	1	0	0	—		0	0	17	1
Peterborough United	2022–23	League One	26	1	2	0	2	0	3	0	33	1
Stevenage	2023–24	League One	31	2	4	0	1	0	2	0	38	2
Stevenage	2024–25	League One	1	0	0	0	1	0	1	0	3	0
Stevenage	Total		32	2	4	0	2	0	3	0	41	2
Bromley (loan)	2024–25	League Two	20	3	2	0	—		0	0	22	3
Bromley	2024–25	League Two	22	3	1	0	—		0	0	23	3
Bromley	2025–26	League Two	34	8	1	0	1	0	2	0	38	8
Bromley	Total		56	11	2	0	1	0	2	0	61	11
Career total			316	29	24	4	18	0	18	0	376	33

== Honours ==
Millwall

- EFL League One play-offs: 2017

Bromley

- EFL League Two: 2025–26

Individual

- Football League Young Player of the Month: April 2016
