= Byron Webster =

English footballer (born 1987)

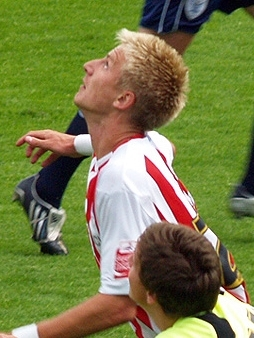
- Webster playing for Doncaster Rovers in 2009

Personal information
- Full name: Byron Clark Webster
- Date of birth: 31 March 1987 (age 39)
- Place of birth: Leeds, England
- Height: 6 ft 3 in (1.91 m)
- Position: Centre-back

Team information
- Current team: Bromley (first-team coach)

Youth career
- –2004: York City

Senior career*
Years	Team	Apps	(Gls)
2004–2007	York City	21	(1)
2007	Harrogate Town	9	(0)
2007	→ Whitby Town (co-registration)	3	(0)
2007–2009	Baník Most	49	(4)
2009–2011	Doncaster Rovers	12	(0)
2010	→ Hereford United (loan)	2	(0)
2011	→ Northampton Town (loan)	8	(0)
2011–2012	Northampton Town	13	(0)
2012–2014	Yeovil Town	85	(8)
2014–2019	Millwall	109	(8)
2015	→ Yeovil Town (loan)	14	(0)
2019	Scunthorpe United	9	(0)
2019–2020	Carlisle United	32	(1)
2020–2026	Bromley	173	(10)
Total		539	(32)

Managerial career
- 2026: Bromley (interim)
- * Club domestic league appearances and goals as of 11:39, 22 October 2026 (UTC)

Byron Clark Webster (born 31 March 1987) is former English professional footballer who played as a centre-back. He is currently first-team coach at Bromley.

== Early and personal life ==
Webster was born in Leeds, West Yorkshire, and raised in Sherburn in Elmet, North Yorkshire. He was educated at Sherburn High School and was able to complete a BTEC National Diploma during his footballing career.

== Career ==
=== Early career ===
Webster made his first-team debut for York City against Burton Albion in the Conference National on 29 December 2004. He scored his first goal for the club in a 2–2 draw against Stevenage Borough on 8 January 2005. He finished the 2004–05 season with 16 appearances and one goal. He made four appearances in all competitions in 2005–06. He signed his first professional contract with York in July 2006. He made four appearances in 2006–07, before being released in February 2007 at his own request. After his release, Webster contemplated retiring and enrolling in university. He signed for Conference North club Harrogate Town in the same month and made his debut against Scarborough in a 1–0 home defeat on 3 February 2007. Whilst being registered with Harrogate, he played three games for Whitby Town in the Northern Premier League Premier Division. He ended the season with nine appearances for Harrogate.

=== Baník Most ===
Webster signed a one-year contract with Czech First League club FK SIAD Most (known as FK Baník Most from 2008 onwards) in August 2007, with an option of an extension until 2010. He made his debut in a 5–2 defeat against Baník Ostrava on 11 August 2007. The 2007–08 concluded with Most suffering relegation to the Czech 2. Liga, although Webster signed a new two-year contract with the club. He started a trial spell at Scottish Premier League club Motherwell in December 2008. The club entered negotiations over a deal for Webster to sign on loan for the rest of the 2008–09 season.

=== Doncaster Rovers ===
Webster had a trial with Bury in July 2009, before leaving to trial with Doncaster Rovers. He gave a "composed performance" in a pre-season friendly against Wolverhampton Wanderers and Doncaster manager Sean O'Driscoll was looking to complete a deal for him to sign for the club. He eventually signed for the Championship club on an initial two-year contract for an undisclosed fee on 5 August 2009. Webster made his Doncaster debut in a 1–0 victory away to Notts County in the League Cup first round on 11 August 2009. He joined League Two club Hereford United on 18 November 2010 on a one-month loan.

=== Northampton Town ===
On 17 March 2011, Webster joined League Two club Northampton Town on loan until the end of 2010–11. On 17 May 2011, Webster was released by Doncaster and on the same day Northampton signed him permanently on a two-year contract.

=== Yeovil Town ===
On 4 July 2012, Webster's contract with Northampton Town was terminated by mutual consent and later that day signed for League One club Yeovil Town on a two-year contract. He scored his first goal for Yeovil in 2–1 victory over Bury, after an attempted clearance from a corner struck him, sending it into the goal. Webster played in the 2–1 victory over Brentford in the 2013 League One play-off final at Wembley Stadium on 19 May 2013, seeing Yeovil win promotion to the Championship for the first time in their history. He finished 2012–13 with 53 appearances and five goals for Yeovil. Webster made 45 appearances and scored four goals in 2013–14 as Yeovil were relegated to League One in bottom place.

=== Millwall ===
Webster turned down a new contract with Yeovil to sign a two-year contract with Championship club Millwall on 24 June 2014.

On 19 February 2015, Webster returned to Yeovil Town on loan until the end of the 2014–15 season.

On 20 May 2017, Webster started for Millwall as they beat Bradford City 1–0 at Wembley Stadium in the 2017 League One play-off final, earning promotion back to the Championship after a two-year absence.

He was offered a new contract by Millwall at the end of the 2017–18 season.

=== Scunthorpe United ===
Webster signed for League One club Scunthorpe United on 4 January 2019 on a contract until the end of the 2018–19 season. He was released by Scunthorpe at the end of 2018–19.

=== Carlisle United ===
Webster signed for League Two club Carlisle United on 24 June 2019 a one-year contract.

=== Bromley ===
On 7 September 2020, it was announced that Webster had signed for National League Club Bromley, linking up with former Millwall teammate Alan Dunne.

On 5 May 2024, Webster captained Bromley to victory in the 2024 National League play-off final, scoring the winning penalty in the shootout as the club reached the Football League for the first time in their history.

On 13 May 2025 the club said the player had signed a new deal.

On 27 April 2026, following the club having secured promotion to League One, he announced that he would be departing the club upon the expiry of his contract at the end of the 2025–26 season.

On 29 July 2026, Webster announced his retirement from football.

== Coaching career ==
Having returned to former club Bromley as a first-team coach, he was appointed interim manager following the sacking of Andy Woodman in October 2026. Following the appointment of new first-team manager Karl Robinson, he remained with the club in a coaching capacity.

== Career statistics ==
As of match played 2 May 2026

Appearances and goals by club, season and competition
Club	Season	League			National Cup (Note: Includes FA Cup)		League Cup (Note: Includes Football League Cup/EFL Cup)		Other		Total	
Club	Season	Division	Apps	Goals	Apps	Goals	Apps	Goals	Apps	Goals	Apps	Goals
York City	2004–05	Conference National	15	1	0	0	—		1 (Note: Appearance(s) in FA Trophy)	0	16	1
York City	2005–06	Conference National	3	0	1	0	—		0	0	4	0
York City	2006–07	Conference National	3	0	0	0	—		1	0	4	0
York City	Total		21	1	1	0	—		2	0	24	1
Harrogate Town	2006–07	Conference North	9	0	—		—		—		9	0
Whitby Town	2006–07	Northern Premier League; Premier Division	3	0	—		—		—		3	0
Baník Most	2007–08	Czech First League	23	4			—		—		23	4
Baník Most	2008–09	Czech 2. Liga	26	0			—		—		26	0
Baník Most	Total		49	4			—		—		49	4
Doncaster Rovers	2009–10	Championship	5	0	0	0	2	0	—		7	0
Doncaster Rovers	2010–11	Championship	7	0	0	0	0	0	—		7	0
Doncaster Rovers	Total		12	0	0	0	2	0	—		14	0
Hereford United (loan)	2010–11	League Two	2	0	—		—		—		2	0
Northampton Town (loan)	2010–11	League Two	8	0	—		—		—		8	0
Northampton Town	2011–12	League Two	13	0	0	0	2	0	1 (Note: Appearance(s) in Football League Trophy/EFL Trophy)	0	16	0
Northampton Town	Total		21	0	0	0	2	0	1	0	24	0
Yeovil Town	2012–13	League One	44	5	0	0	2	0	7 (Note: Four appearances in Football League Trophy, three appearances in League One play-offs)	0	53	5
Yeovil Town	2013–14	Championship	41	3	2	0	2	1	—		45	4
Yeovil Town	Total		85	8	2	0	4	1	7	0	98	9
Millwall	2014–15	Championship	11	0	1	0	2	0	—		14	0
Millwall	2015–16	League One	40	6	2	0	1	0	8 (Note: Five appearances in Football League Trophy, three appearances in League One play-offs)	0	51	6
Millwall	2016–17	League One	44	2	6	0	2	0	3 (Note: Appearances in League One play-offs)	0	55	2
Millwall	2017–18	Championship	10	0	0	0	2	0	—		12	0
Millwall	2018–19	Championship	4	0	—		2	0	—		6	0
Millwall	Total		109	8	9	0	9	0	11	0	138	8
Yeovil Town (loan)	2014–15	League One	14	0	—		—		—		14	0
Scunthorpe United	2018–19	League One	9	0	—		—		—		9	0
Carlisle United	2019–20	League Two	32	1	5	0	2	0	0	0	39	1
Bromley	2020–21	National League	27	2	1	0	—		2 (Note: One appearance in FA Trophy, one appearance and one goal in National League play-offs)	1	30	3
Bromley	2021–22	National League	40	5	2	0	—		3	0	45	5
Bromley	2022–23	National League	32	1	1	0	—		2 (Note: One appearance and one goal in FA Trophy, one appearance in National League play-offs)	0	35	2
Bromley	2023–24	National League	35	1	2	0	—		5 (Note: Three appearances in FA Trophy, two appearances in National League play-offs)	0	42	1
Bromley	2024–25	League Two	28	1	3	0	0	0	0	0	31	1
Bromley	2025–26	League Two	11	0	0	0	1	0	3	1	15	1
Bromley	Total		173	10	9	0	1	0	15	2	198	12
Career total			539	32	26	0	20	1	36	3	621	36

== Honours ==
Yeovil Town

- Football League One play-offs: 2013

Millwall

- EFL League One play-offs: 2017

Bromley

- EFL League Two: 2025–26
- National League play-offs: 2024
- FA Trophy: 2021–22
