= Soul Kader =

English footballer (born 2004)

Personal information
- Full name: Soul Alidean Kader
- Date of birth: 31 January 2004 (age 22)
- Place of birth: Milton Keynes, England
- Height: 1.75 m (5 ft 9 in)
- Position: Striker

Team information
- Current team: Bromley
- Number: 24

Youth career
- –2022: Bromley

Senior career*
| Years | Team | Apps | (Gls) |
| 2022– | Bromley | 3 | (1) |
| 2022 | → Cray Wanderers (loan) | 8 | (1) |
| 2022–2023 | → VCD Athletic (loan) | 22 | (11) |
| 2024 | → AFC Croydon Athletic (loan) | 4 | (2) |
| 2025 | → Carshalton Athletic (loan) | 5 | (1) |
| 2025 | → Cray Wanderers (loan) | 11 | (10) |
| 2025 | → Hampton and Richmond Borough (loan) | 13 | (0) |
| 2025–2026 | → Cray Wanderers (loan) | 5 | (4) |
| 2026 | → Horsham (loan) | 3 | (0) |
| 2026- | → Cray Wanderers (loan) | 1 | (0) |
- * Club domestic league appearances and goals as of 21:37, 10 Aug 2026 (UTC)

Soul Alidean Kader (Arabic: شاول قادر; born 31 January 2004) is an English professional footballer who currently plays as a striker for Isthmian League Premier Division club Cray Wanderers on loan from EFL League One club Bromley.

== Career ==
Prior to his senior debut, Kader played for Bromley's youth academy. In 2021, Kader was named on the bench for Bromley's senior side for the first time in an FA Trophy win over Dover Athletic, but was not used in the game. Following a loan at Cray Wanderers, Kader signed his first professional contract with Bromley in 2022. He was then sent on loan to VCD Athletic, where he scored 11 goals in 22 league appearances.

Kader made his senior debut for Bromley in August 2023. However, after making 2 appearances and scoring 1 goal in the National League, he was injured in a game against Kidderminster Harriers. This injury would rule him out for the remainder of the season, as Bromley were promoted from the National League to League Two. He signed a new contract with Bromley whilst sidelined with injury.

After recovering from injury, Kader was sent on a series of short-term loans to AFC Croydon Athletic, Carshalton Athletic, and Cray Wanderers, where Kader scored 10 goals in 11 league games. Following the expiry of his loan deal with Cray Wanderers, Kader returned to Bromley, where he made his League Two debut as a substitute during the final game of the 2024–25 season.

In Bromley's 2025–26 season, after playing in an EFL Cup first-round game against Ipswich Town, Kader was sent to Hampton & Richmond Borough on a short-term loan. This was followed by another short-term loan spell at Cray Wanderers.

On 6 January 2026 Kader moved to Horsham on loan for the remainder of the season. Kader made his Horsham debut the same day, coming on in the 71st minute of a 2-0 victory over Eastbourne Borough. However, following an injury in training and a torn hamstring in a game against Dagenham & Redbridge, Kader's loan spell at Horsham was cancelled on 3 March 2026. This was followed by a fourth loan spell at Cray Wanderers for the start of the 2026-27 season.

== Personal life ==
Kader was born in Milton Keynes. He holds English and Egyptian nationality.

== Career statistics ==
As of match played 10 February 2026

Appearances and goals by club, season and competition
| Club | Season | League | | | FA Cup | | EFL Cup | | Other | | Total | |
| Club | Season | Division | Apps | Goals | Apps | Goals | Apps | Goals | Apps | Goals | Apps | Goals |
|---|---|---|---|---|---|---|---|---|---|---|---|---|
| Bromley | 2021–22 | National League | 0 | 0 | 0 | 0 | — | | 0 | 0 | 0 | 0 |
| Bromley | 2022–23 | National League | 0 | 0 | 0 | 0 | — | | 0 | 0 | 0 | 0 |
| Bromley | 2023–24 | National League | 2 | 1 | 0 | 0 | — | | 0 | 0 | 2 | 1 |
| Bromley | 2024–25 | League Two | 1 | 0 | 0 | 0 | 0 | 0 | 0 | 0 | 1 | 0 |
| Bromley | 2025–26 | League Two | 0 | 0 | 0 | 0 | 1 | 0 | 0 | 0 | 1 | 0 |
| Bromley | Total | | 3 | 1 | 0 | 0 | 1 | 0 | 0 | 0 | 4 | 1 |
| Cray Wanderers (loan) | 2021–22 | Isthmian League Premier Division | 8 | 1 | 0 | 0 | — | | 0 | 0 | 8 | 1 |
| VCD Athletic (loan) | 2022–23 | Isthmian League South East Division | 22 | 11 | 0 | 0 | — | | 0 | 0 | 22 | 11 |
| AFC Croydon Athletic (loan) | 2024–25 | Isthmian League South East Division | 4 | 2 | 0 | 0 | — | | 0 | 0 | 4 | 2 |
| Carshalton Athletic (loan) | 2024–25 | Isthmian League Premier Division | 5 | 1 | 0 | 0 | — | | 1 (Note: Appearance in Surrey Senior Cup) | 0 | 6 | 1 |
| Cray Wanderers (loan) | 2024–25 | Isthmian League Premier Division | 11 | 10 | 0 | 0 | — | | 0 | 0 | 11 | 10 |
| Hampton & Richmond Borough (loan) | 2025–26 | National League South | 13 | 0 | 0 | 0 | — | | 0 | 0 | 13 | 0 |
| Cray Wanderers (loan) | 2025–26 | Isthmian League Premier Division | 5 | 4 | 0 | 0 | — | | 0 | 0 | 5 | 4 |
| Horsham (loan) | 2025–26 | National League South | 3 | 0 | 0 | 0 | — | | 0 | 0 | 3 | 0 |
| Career total | | | 74 | 30 | 0 | 0 | 1 | 0 | 1 | 0 | 76 | 30 |
