= Idris Odutayo =

English footballer

Personal information
- Full name: Idris Adewale Olarewaju Odutayo
- Date of birth: 26 October 2002 (age 24)
- Place of birth: Lambeth, England
- Height: 1.85 m (6 ft 1 in)
- Position: Defender

Team information
- Current team: Dundee
- Number: 3

Senior career*
Years	Team	Apps	(Gls)
2022–2024	Fulham	0	(0)
2022–2023	→ Maidenhead United (loan)	21	(0)
2024–2026	Bromley	88	(4)
2026–	Dundee	7	(0)
- * Club domestic league appearances and goals as of 21:44, 21 November 2026 (UTC)

Idris Adewale Olarewaju Odutayo (born 26 October 2002) is an English professional footballer who plays as a defender for Scottish Premiership club Dundee.

== Career ==
Odutayo began his career with Fulham progressing through the academy ranks, signing a two-year scholarship deal in July 2019, before going on to sign a one-year contract. In August 2022, he signed a new two-year contract, joining National League side Maidenhead United on loan until 2 January 2023, later extended until the end of the season.

=== Bromley ===
On 1 February 2024, Odutayo joined National League side Bromley on a permanent deal. On 5 May 2024, he played the full duration of the 2024 National League play-off final as Bromley defeated Solihull Moors on penalties to earn promotion to the Football League for the first time in their history.

Following the club's title-winning 2025–26 season, he was offered a new contract to remain with the club ahead of a first ever season in League One. In June 2026, the club announced that he had decided to pursue alternative options and would depart the club upon the expiry of his deal.

=== Dundee ===
On 26 June 2026, Odutayo agreed to join Scottish Premiership club Dundee on an initial two-year deal.

== Career statistics ==
As of 21 November 2026

Appearances and goals by club, season and competition
Club	Season	League			National Cup (Note: Includes FA Cup)		League Cup (Note: Includes Football League Cup/EFL Cup)		Other		Total	
Club	Season	Division	Apps	Goals	Apps	Goals	Apps	Goals	Apps	Goals	Apps	Goals
Fulham U23	2022–23	—			—		—		0	0	0	0
Fulham U23	2023–24	—			—		—		2 (Note: Appearance(s) in EFL Trophy)	0	2	0
Fulham U23	Total				—		—		2	0	2	0
Maidenhead United (loan)	2022–23	National League	21	0	1	0	—		2 (Note: Appearance(s) in FA Trophy)	0	24	0
Bromley	2023–24	National League	9	1	0	0	—		4 (Note: Two appearances in FA Trophy, two appearances in National League play-offs)	0	13	1
Bromley	2024–25	League Two	34	1	3	0	1	0	2	0	40	0
Bromley	2025–26	League Two	45	2	1	0	2	0	3	1	51	3
Bromley	Total		88	4	4	0	3	0	6	1	53	5
Dundee	2026–27	Scottish Premiership	7	0	0	0	5	0	0	0	12	0
Career total			116	4	5	0	8	0	13	1	142	5

== Honours ==
Bromley

- EFL League Two: 2025–26
- National League play-offs: 2024
