= Grant Smith (footballer, born 1993) =

English footballer (born 1993)

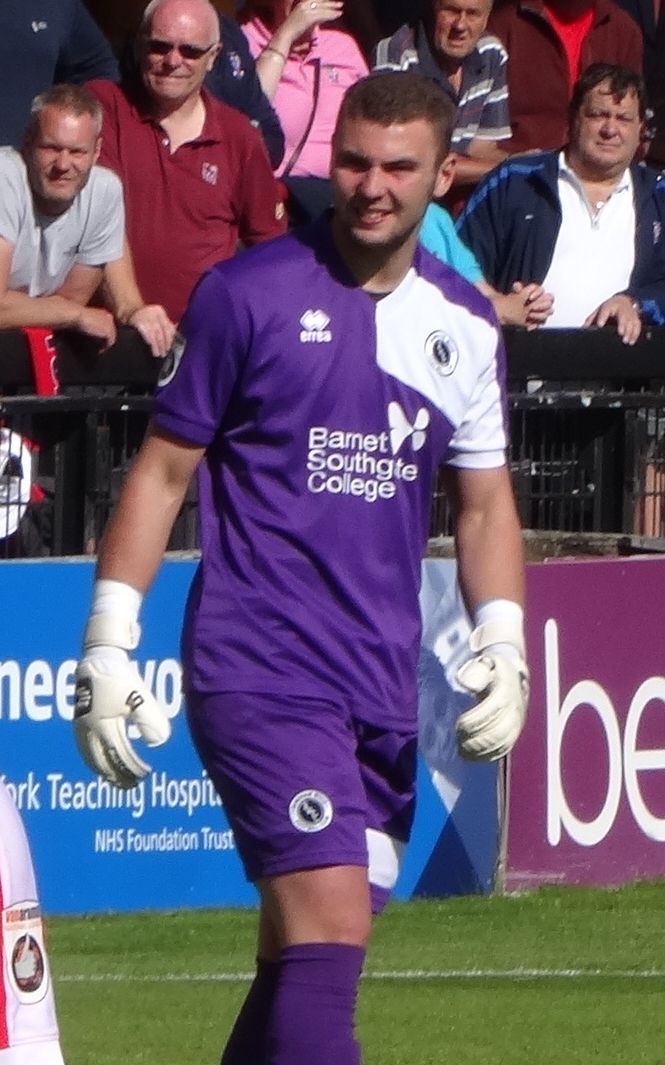
- Smith playing for Boreham Wood in 2016

Personal information
- Full name: Grant Ashley Smith
- Date of birth: 20 November 1993 (age 32)
- Place of birth: Reading, England
- Height: 6 ft 1 in (1.85 m)
- Position: Goalkeeper

Team information
- Current team: Bromley
- Number: 1

Youth career
- 2007–2010: Reading
- 2010–2012: Fulham
- 2012–2014: Brighton & Hove Albion

Senior career*
Years	Team	Apps	(Gls)
2014	Brighton & Hove Albion	0	(0)
2014	→ Bognor Regis Town (loan)	18	(0)
2014	Hayes & Yeading United	0	(0)
2014	Farnborough	3	(0)
2014–2015	Hayes & Yeading United	18	(0)
2015–2016	Bognor Regis Town	46	(0)
2016–2018	Boreham Wood	92	(0)
2018–2020	Lincoln City	16	(0)
2018	→ Maidstone United (loan)	5	(0)
2020	→ Boreham Wood (loan)	1	(0)
2020	Wealdstone	0	(0)
2021	Chesterfield	18	(0)
2021–2023	Yeovil Town	81	(0)
2023–	Bromley	134	(0)

International career
2017–2018	England C	2	(0)
- * Club domestic league appearances and goals as of 21:33, 10 November 2026 (UTC)

Grant Ashley Smith (born 20 November 1993) is an English professional footballer who plays as a goalkeeper for EFL League One club Bromley.

== Career ==
Smith began his career playing in the youth system of Eldon Celtic before joining the academy of Reading in 2007, before moving to Fulham. After spending two years with Fulham, Smith joined the development squad at Brighton & Hove Albion in September 2012, agreeing a one-year contract extension in May 2013. He joined Bognor Regis Town in February 2014. In May 2014 he was released by Brighton & Hove Albion. He joined Hayes & Yeading United in September 2014, before moving to Farnborough a month later. However, after just three appearances, Smith returned to Hayes & Yeading United at the end of October

The 2015–16 season saw his second spell with Bognor Regis Town where he was an ever present in the club's successful season which included a run to the semi-final of the FA Trophy; Smith's efforts saw him named the Fans' Player of the Year but the distance in travelling from his Reading home saw him elect to leave the club at the end of the season and join Boreham Wood. He started all 92 of Boreham Wood's National League games over the following two seasons.

Smith signed for Lincoln City in June 2018. He made his professional debut on 14 August 2018, in the EFL Cup. He signed on loan for Maidstone United in October 2018, but was recalled on 4 December 2018. On 31 January 2020 he rejoined Boreham Wood on loan for the rest of the 2019/20 season. On 28 May 2020, it was announced Smith would leave the club at the end of his current contract.

On 24 October 2020, Smith joined Wealdstone. Less than a month later Smith was released as Wealdstone tried to balance the books during the COVID-19 pandemic.

In January 2021, Smith signed for fellow National League side Chesterfield. Originally only on a short-term contract, Smith signed a new contract extension in April 2021 that would keep him at the club until the summer of 2022. Smith left the club by mutual consent on 18 June 2021.

On 23 June 2021, Smith joined National League side Yeovil Town on a one-year deal. Smith has his contract extension triggered at the end of the 2021–22 season. At the end of the 2022–23 season, Smith was released by Yeovil following the club's relegation from the National League.

On 4 July 2023, Smith returned to the National League with Bromley. On 5 May 2024, he saved two penalties as Bromley defeated Solihull Moors on penalties to earn promotion to the English Football League for the first time in the club's history. He signed a new contract with Bromley in January 2025.

His contract with Bromley was renewed for the 2026–27 season, after the club exercised a contract option.

== Career statistics ==
As of match played 10 November 2026

Appearances and goals by club, season and competition
Club	Season	League			FA Cup		League Cup		Other		Total	
Club	Season	Division	Apps	Goals	Apps	Goals	Apps	Goals	Apps	Goals	Apps	Goals
Brighton & Hove Albion	2013–14	Championship	0	0	0	0	0	0	0	0	0	0
Bognor Regis Town (loan)	2013–14	Isthmian League; Premier Division	18	0	0	0	—		1 (Note: One appearance in Isthmian League Premier Division play-offs)	0	19	0
Farnborough	2014–15	Conference South	3	0	0	0	—		0	0	3	0
Hayes & Yeading United	2014–15	Conference South	18	0	0	0	—		4 (Note: Two appearances in FA Trophy, two appearances in Middlesex Senior Cup)	0	22	0
Bognor Regis Town	2015–16	Isthmian League; Premier Division	46	0	4	0	—		15 (Note: Ten appearances in FA Trophy, four appearances in Sussex Senior Cup, one appearance in Isthmian League Premier Division play-offs)	0	65	0
Boreham Wood	2016–17	National League	46	0	3	0	—		6 (Note: Appearance(s) in FA Trophy)	0	55	0
Boreham Wood	2017–18	National League	46	0	3	0	—		10 (Note: Four appearances in FA Trophy, three appearances in Herts Senior Cup, three in National League play-offs)	0	59	0
Boreham Wood	Total		92	0	6	0	0	0	16	0	114	0
Lincoln City	2018–19	League Two	16	0	0	0	1	0	0	0	17	0
Lincoln City	2019–20	League One	0	0	0	0	2	0	3 (Note: Appearance(s) in the EFL Trophy)	0	5	0
Lincoln City	Total		16	0	0	0	3	0	3	0	22	0
Maidstone United (loan)	2018–19	National League	5	0	2	0	—		0	0	7	0
Boreham Wood (loan)	2019–20	National League	1	0	0	0	—		1 (Note: Appearance in National League play-offs)	0	2	0
Wealdstone	2020–21	National League	0	0	1	0	—		0	0	1	0
Chesterfield	2020–21	National League	18	0	—		—		0	0	18	0
Yeovil Town	2021–22	National League	37	0	4	0	—		2 (Note: One appearance in FA Trophy, one appearance in Somerset Premier Cup)	0	43	0
Yeovil Town	2022–23	National League	44	0	2	0	—		0	0	46	0
Yeovil Town	Total		81	0	6	0	0	0	2	0	89	0
Bromley	2023–24	National League	41	0	2	0	—		5 (Note: Three appearances in FA Trophy, two appearances in National League play-offs)	0	48	0
Bromley	2024–25	League Two	45	0	3	0	0	0	0	0	48	0
Bromley	2025–26	League Two	43	0	1	0	0	0	0	0	44	0
Bromley	2026–27	League One	5	0	0	0	0	0	1	0	6	0
Bromley	Total		134	0	6	0	0	0	6	0	146	0
Career total			434	0	25	0	3	0	48	0	510	0

== Honours ==
Lincoln City

- EFL League Two: 2018–19

Bromley

- EFL League Two: 2025–26
- National League play-offs: 2024

Individual

- National League Team of the Season: 2023–24
