= Kamarl Grant =

English footballer (born 2003)

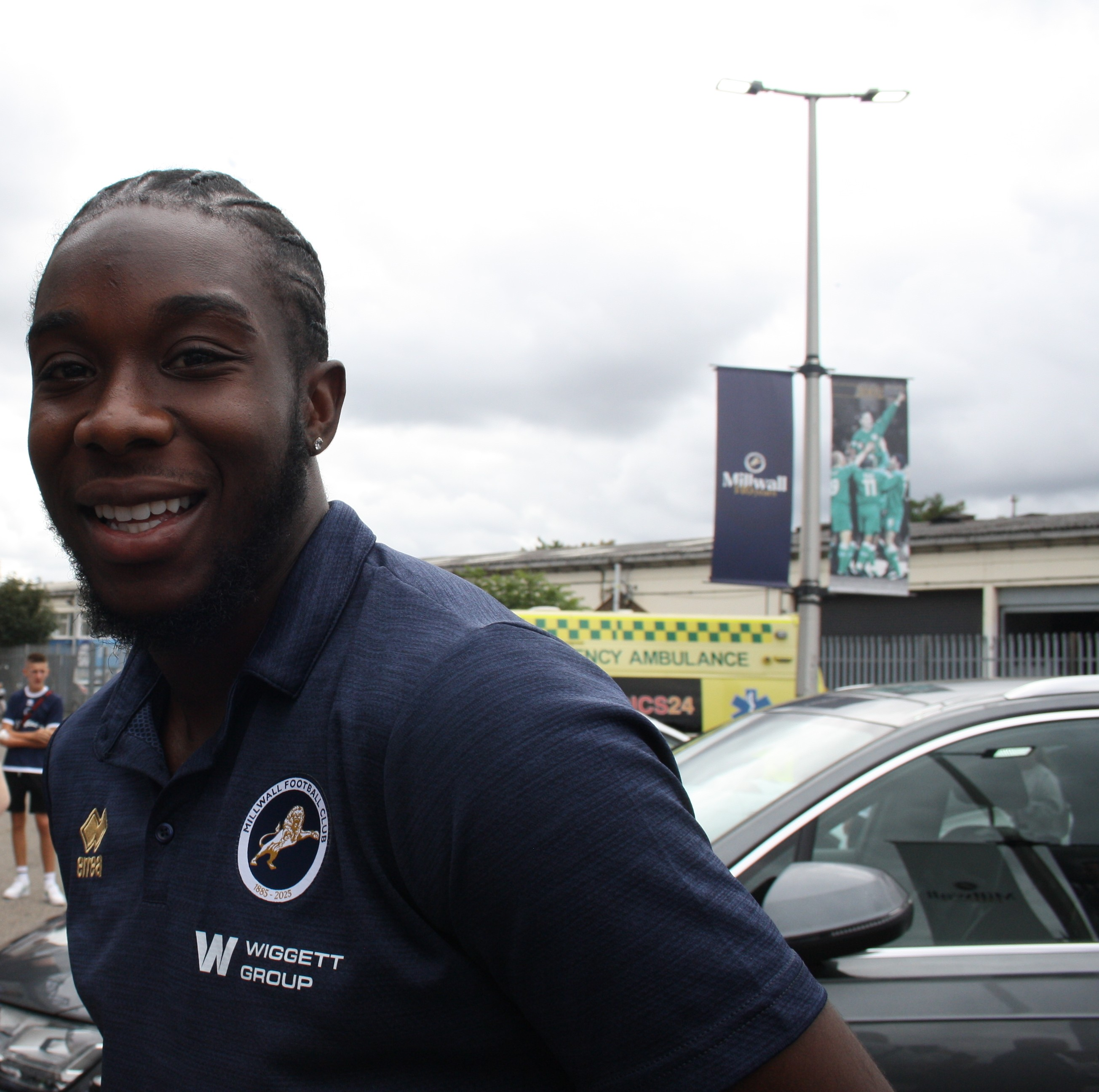
- Grant in 2025.

Personal information
- Full name: Kamarl Antonio Grant
- Date of birth: 26 January 2003 (age 23)
- Position: Defender

Team information
- Current team: Bromley (on loan from Millwall)
- Number: 21

Youth career
- Crystal Palace
- –2019: Kinetic Academy
- 2019–2022: Sheffield United

Senior career*
Years	Team	Apps	(Gls)
2020–2022	Sheffield United	0	(0)
2020	→ Gainsborough Trinity (loan)	6	(1)
2022–	Millwall	0	(0)
2022	→ Dagenham & Redbridge (loan)	4	(0)
2024	→ Bromley (loan)	11	(0)
2024–2025	→ Bromley (loan)	40	(2)
2026	→ Blackpool (loan)	3	(0)
2026–	→ Bromley (loan)	12	(1)
- * Club domestic league appearances and goals as of 11:22, 22 November 2026 (UTC)

Kamarl Antonio Grant (born 26 January 2003) is an English professional footballer who plays as a defender for Bromley, on loan from EFL Championship club Millwall.

== Career ==
Grant began his career in the youth team at Crystal Palace before joining up with the Kinetic Foundation who changed his position from a forward to a central defender. He was captain of the side that reached the 3rd Round Proper of the 2019–20 FA Youth Cup, eventually falling to an 8–1 defeat to Wigan Athletic. His performances in this competition alerted professional clubs and he was signed by Premier League side Sheffield United in December 2019 and placed into the Academy. In September 2020, he signed for Northern Premier League Premier Division side Gainsborough Trinity on an initial one-month loan to cover injuries in their defence. After moving to Millwall, he signed on loan for Dagenham & Redbridge in September 2022.

He joined Bromley on loan in February 2024. He rejoined Bromley in July 2024 on loan, following their promotion.

On 14 January 2026, Grant joined League One side Blackpool on loan until the end of the season.

In August 2026, Grant re-signed for Bromley, his third loan spell with the club.

== Career statistics ==
As of match played on 21 November 2026

Appearances and goals by club, season and competition
Club	Season	League			FA Cup		EFL Cup		Other		Total	
Club	Season	Division	Apps	Goals	Apps	Goals	Apps	Goals	Apps	Goals	Apps	Goals
Gainsborough Trinity (loan)	2020–21	Northern Premier League Premier Division	6	1	0	0	0	0	0	0	6	1
Millwall	2022–23	Championship	0	0	0	0	0	0	0	0	0	0
Millwall	2023–24	Championship	0	0	0	0	0	0	0	0	0	0
Millwall	2024–25	Championship	0	0	0	0	0	0	0	0	0	0
Millwall	2025–26	Championship	0	0	1	0	3	1	0	0	4	1
Millwall	2026–27	Championship	0	0	0	0	0	0	0	0	0	0
Millwall	Total		0	0	1	0	3	1	0	0	4	1
Dagenham & Redbridge (loan)	2022–23	National League	4	0	0	0	0	0	0	0	4	0
Bromley (loan)	2023–24	National League	11	0	0	0	0	0	3 (Note: One appearance in the FA Trophy, two appearances in the play-offs)	0	14	0
Bromley (loan)	2024–25	League Two	40	2	2	0	1	0	1 (Note: Appearance in the EFL Trophy)	0	44	2
Blackpool (loan)	2025–26	League One	3	0	0	0	0	0	0	0	3	0
Bromley (loan)	2026–27	League One	12	1	1	0	1	0	0	0	14	1
Career total			76	4	4	0	5	1	4	0	89	5
