= Zech Medley =

English footballer (born 2000)

Personal information
- Full name: Zechariah Joshua Henry Medley
- Date of birth: 9 July 2000 (age 26)
- Place of birth: Greenwich, London, England
- Height: 6 ft 5 in (1.95 m)
- Position: Centre-back

Team information
- Current team: York City
- Number: 4

Youth career
- 2008–2016: Chelsea
- 2016–2018: Arsenal

Senior career*
Years	Team	Apps	(Gls)
2018–2021	Arsenal	0	(0)
2020–2021	→ Gillingham (loan)	12	(0)
2021	→ Kilmarnock (loan)	8	(1)
2021–2024	KV Oostende	58	(3)
2024–2026	Fleetwood Town	28	(2)
2026	→ Bromley (loan)	9	(0)
2026–	York City	4	(0)

International career
2015–2016	England U16	8	(0)
- * Club domestic league appearances and goals as of 12 September 2026 (UTC)

Zechariah Joshua Henry Medley (born 9 July 2000) is an English professional footballer who plays as a centre-back for EFL League Two club York City.

== Club career ==
Born in Greenwich, London, Medley joined the youth academy at Chelsea when he was eight years old.

=== Arsenal ===
Upon leaving Chelsea, he joined the youth academy at Arsenal in December 2016. He captained the Arsenal under-18's at the beginning of the 2017–18 season before moving to the under-23 side.

On 22 October 2018, Medley appeared on the bench for the Arsenal senior side for the first time in a Premier League match against Leicester City. A month later, on 29 November, Medley made his senior competitive debut for Arsenal in the Europa League against Vorskla Poltava, coming on as a 60th-minute substitute for Rob Holding.

==== Loan spells ====
Medley had joined League One club Gillingham on a season-long loan on 10 August 2020, becoming their fourth signing of the summer. On 5 September, he made his debut in a 1–0 win against Southend United in the EFL Cup. He made a total of 18 appearances for the club before he was recalled on 1 February 2021. He immediately joined Scottish Premiership side Kilmarnock on loan until the end of the season. On 6 February, he made his debut in a 2–0 loss against St Mirren in the Scottish Premiership. On 27 February, he scored his first goal for Kilmarnock in a 1–1 draw against Dundee United in the Scottish Premiership.

=== KV Oostende ===
On 21 June 2021, Medley joined Belgian First Division A side KV Oostende on a permanent deal, signing a four-year contract with the option of an additional year.

=== Fleetwood Town ===
On 2 July 2024, Medley returned to England, signing for League Two club Fleetwood Town on a two-year deal. In August 2024, he underwent surgery following a ruptured achilles, returning to playing with the club's Development Squad in March 2025.

On 29 January 2026, Medley joined League Two leaders Bromley on loan until the end of the season.

On 15 May 2026, Fleetwood announced he would be leaving in the summer when his contract expired.

=== York City ===
On 26 June 2026, Medley agreed to join newly promoted League Two club York City from 1 July.

== International career ==
Born in England, Medley is of Jamaican descent. He is a youth international for England.

== Career statistics ==
As of match played 23 April 2026

Appearances and goals by club, season and competition
Club	Season	League			National cup (Note: Includes FA Cup, Scottish Cup, Belgian Cup)		League cup (Note: Includes EFL Cup, Scottish League Cup)		Continental		Other		Total	
Club	Season	Division	Apps	Goals	Apps	Goals	Apps	Goals	Apps	Goals	Apps	Goals	Apps	Goals
Arsenal	2018–19	Premier League	0	0	1	0	0	0	2 (Note: Appearances in UEFA Europa League)	0	3 (Note: Appearances in EFL Trophy)	0	6	0
Arsenal	2019–20	Premier League	0	0	0	0	0	0	0	0	2	0	2	0
Arsenal	2020–21	Premier League	0	0	0	0	0	0	0	0	0	0	0	0
Arsenal	Total		0	0	1	0	0	0	2	0	5	0	8	0
Gillingham (loan)	2020–21	League One	12	0	0	0	2	0	—		4	0	18	0
Kilmarnock (loan)	2020–21	Scottish Premiership	8	1	2	0	0	0	—		—		10	1
KV Oostende	2021–22	Belgian Pro League	18	1	2	0	—		—		—		20	1
KV Oostende	2022–23	Belgian Pro League	15	1	1	0	—		—		—		16	1
KV Oostende	2023–24	Challenger Pro League	25	1	5	0	—		—		—		30	1
KV Oostende	Total		58	3	8	0	0	0	0	0	0	0	66	3
Fleetwood Town	2024–25	League Two	7	1	0	0	1	0	—		0	0	8	1
Fleetwood Town	2025–26	League Two	21	1	2	1	0	0	—		4	2	27	4
Fleetwood Town	Total		28	2	2	1	1	0	0	0	4	2	35	5
Bromley (loan)	2025–26	League Two	9	0	—		—		—		—		9	0
Career total			115	6	13	1	3	0	2	0	13	2	146	9

== Honours ==
Bromley

- EFL League Two: 2025–26
