= Marcus Dinanga =

English footballer (born 1998)

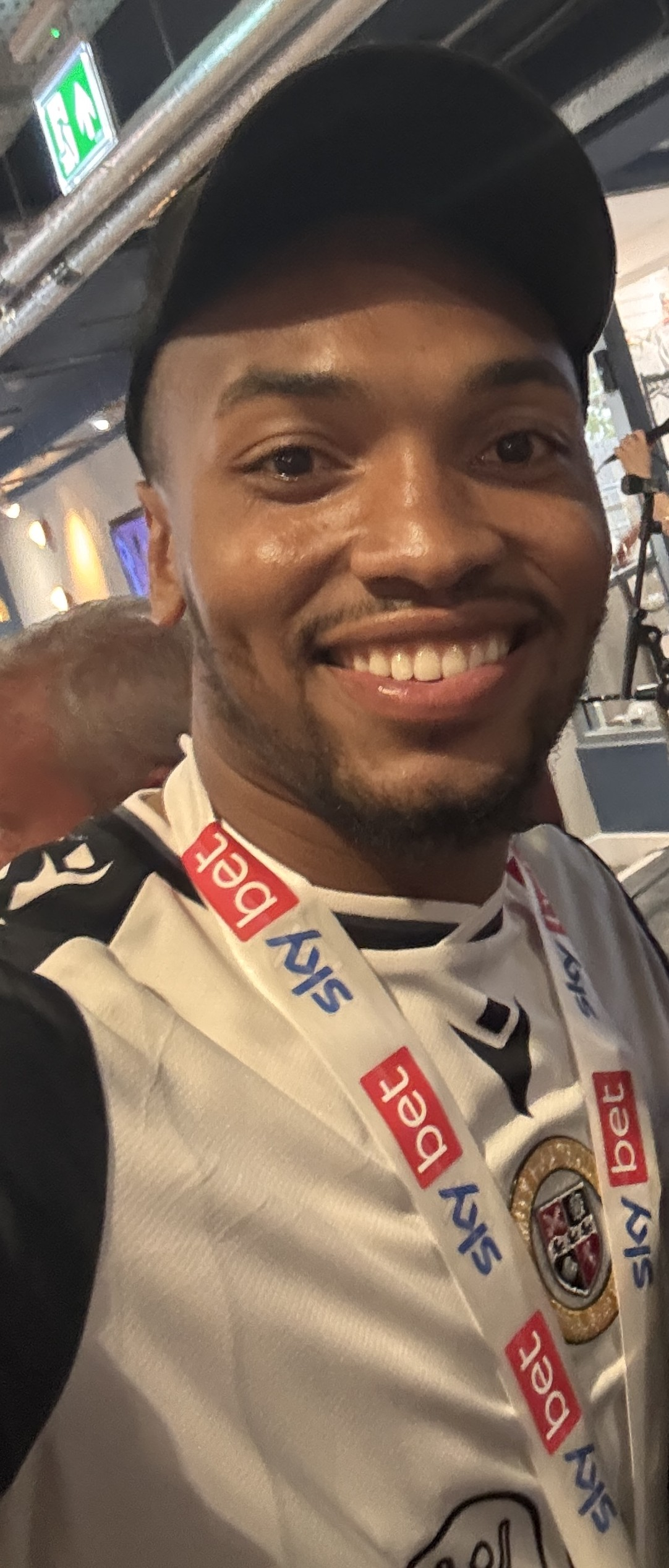
- Dinanga in 2026

Personal information
- Full name: Marcus Nyamabu Dinanga
- Date of birth: 2 January 1998 (age 28)
- Place of birth: Gravesend, England
- Height: 1.80 m (5 ft 11 in)
- Position: Forward

Team information
- Current team: Aldershot Town
- Number: 9

Youth career
- –2016: Burton Albion

Senior career*
| Years | Team | Apps | (Gls) |
| 2016–2019 | Burton Albion | 0 | (0) |
| 2016 | → Mickleover Sports (loan) | ? | (?) |
| 2016–2017 | → Matlock Town (loan) | 40 | (23) |
| 2017–2018 | → AFC Telford United (loan) | 39 | (16) |
| 2018 | → Hartlepool United (loan) | 15 | (0) |
| 2019–2020 | AFC Telford United | 45 | (14) |
| 2020–2021 | Stevenage | 6 | (1) |
| 2021 | → Chesterfield (loan) | 12 | (1) |
| 2021–2023 | Altrincham | 39 | (7) |
| 2021–2022 | → Kidderminster Harriers (loan) | 6 | (1) |
| 2022 | → Dartford (loan) | 15 | (13) |
| 2023–2024 | Gateshead | 60 | (27) |
| 2024–2026 | Bromley | 23 | (1) |
| 2026– | Aldershot Town | 0 | (0) |
- * Club domestic league appearances and goals as of 17:10, 14 May 2026 (UTC)

Marcus Nyamabu Dinanga (born 2 January 1998) is an English professional footballer who plays as a forward for National League club Aldershot Town.

A product of the Burton Albion academy, Dinanga spent time out on loan at Mickleover Sports before signing his first professional contract at Burton. He spent the 2016–17 season with Matlock Town of the Northern Premier League. Dinanga was loaned out once again, this time to National League North club AFC Telford United in August 2017. He ended the 2017–18 season as the club's top goalscorer. A season-long loan to Hartlepool United followed in July 2018. The agreement was cut short in December 2018 and Dinanga subsequently rejoined Telford, this time on a permanent basis. He signed for League Two club Stevenage in August 2020 and spent time on loan at Chesterfield during the 2020–21 season. Dinanga then signed for National League club Altrincham in June 2021.

== Career ==
=== Burton Albion ===
Dinanga graduated from the Burton Albion academy, signing his first professional contract with the club ahead of the 2016–17 season. Having previously spent time on a work-experience loan at Mickleover Sports in February 2016, he joined Matlock Town of the Northern Premier League in August 2016 on an initial one-month loan deal. He scored his first goal for Matlock in the club's 3–1 victory over Sutton Coldfield Town on 23 August 2016. Dinanga scored a hat-trick in a 3–1 win against Stourbridge on 10 September 2016. After scoring five goals within the space of a month, the loan agreement was extended until 2 January 2017. He continued to represent Burton's reserve team during his time on loan at Matlock, playing in reserve matches, as well as in the Birmingham Senior Cup. Having scored 18 goals in all competitions for Matlock, the loan deal was extended for the remainder of the 2016–17 season. He went on to score 34 goals in all competitions for the club during the loan spell. Dinanga was also named in the Northern Premier League Team of the Year at the end-of-season awards ceremony.

He returned to Burton and, having scored five goals for the first team in pre-season ahead of the 2017–18 season, signed a one-year contract extension on 31 July 2017. Dinanga joined National League North club AFC Telford United on a season-long loan deal on 14 August 2017. He had featured for AFC Telford in a pre-season friendly against Shrewsbury Town prior to signing the agreement, impressing manager Rob Edwards enough to earn the loan deal. On the same day as his signing was announced, Dinanga made his Telford debut in the club's 1–0 away defeat to Curzon Ashton. He scored the winning goal in the club's next match; a 1–0 away victory at Darlington on 19 August 2017. Dinanga ended the season as the club's top goalscorer, scoring 25 goals in all competitions. With his contract at Burton set to expire, the club took up the option to extend it for a further year on 4 May 2018. Dinanga was loaned out again, this time making another step up in division, joining National League club Hartlepool United on a season-long loan on 18 July 2018. He made 19 appearances, of which five were as a starter, during the first half of the 2018–19 season, without scoring any goals.

=== AFC Telford United ===
With Dinanga's game-time at Hartlepool limited to mainly substitute appearances, Burton manager Nigel Clough stated he would talk to the player about what he wanted to do for the second half of the season. Dinanga's loan agreement with Hartlepool was subsequently cut short in December 2018. He signed an 18-month contract to rejoin AFC Telford United, this time on a permanent basis, on 4 January 2019. Telford manager Gavin Cowan stated the club had secured his signing ahead of a number of other teams. The agreement was made just in time to ensure he was eligible to play the following day, making his second debut for the club in a 2–1 victory against Spennymoor Town. He scored twice in 15 appearances, of which eight were as a substitute, during the remainder of the 2018–19 season. Dinanga scored five goals during the first half of the 2019–20 season, including scoring a second-half hat-trick in a 3–2 comeback victory away at Darlington on 30 November 2019. He ended the season by scoring seven goals in his last eight games, stating he had benefited from the service from wingers Ryan Barnett and Brendon Daniels. Dinanga scored twelve goals in 31 appearances during the season.

=== Stevenage ===
Following a successful trial period, Dinanga signed for League Two club Stevenage on 21 August 2020. He scored on his debut for Stevenage in the club's 2–1 EFL Trophy victory over Southampton U21s on 22 September 2020. After making nine appearances for Stevenage during the first half of the 2020–21 season,

==== Chesterfield (loan) ====
Dinanga joined National League club Chesterfield on 5 January 2021, signing a loan agreement for the remainder of the season. He made his debut for Chesterfield on the same day as his signing was announced, coming on as a 59th-minute substitute in a 2–1 away defeat to Solihull Moors. Dinanga scored once in 12 appearances during his time on loan at Chesterfield.

=== Altrincham ===
Dinanga joined National League club Altrincham for an undisclosed fee on 10 June 2021. He debuted for Altrincham in the club's first match of the 2021–22 season, scoring the opening goal of the game in a 3–1 away victory against Torquay United.

==== Kidderminster Harriers (loan) ====
On 24 December 2021, Dinanga joined National League North side Kidderminster Harriers on loan for roughly five weeks.

==== Dartford ====
On 1 February 2022, Dinanga joined National League South side Dartford on loan until the end of the 2021–22 season. After scoring three goals in four matches, Dinanga was awarded the league's Player of the Month award for February 2022.

=== Gateshead ===
On 4 February 2023, Dinanga signed for fellow National League club Gateshead for an undisclosed fee on an eighteen-month contract.

A stellar start to the 2023–24 season saw Dinanga awarded the National League Player of the Month award for September 2023 having scored eight goals across the month. He was a member of the Gateshead side that won the 2023–24 FA Trophy and was a substitute in extra-time in the final at Wembley Stadium. Dinanga finished the 2023–24 campaign with 26 goals in 50 appearances in all competitions.

=== Bromley ===
On 4 July 2024, Dinanga signed for newly promoted League Two side Bromley for an undisclosed fee.

On 14 May 2026, it was announced that Dinanga would leave Bromley following the expiration of his contract.

=== Aldershot Town ===
On 19 June 2026, following his release from Bromley, Dinanga agreed to return to the National League to join Aldershot Town.

== Career statistics ==
As of 3 April 2026

Appearances and goals by club, season and competition
| Club | Season | League | | | FA Cup | | EFL Cup | | Other | | Total | |
| Club | Season | Division | Apps | Goals | Apps | Goals | Apps | Goals | Apps | Goals | Apps | Goals |
|---|---|---|---|---|---|---|---|---|---|---|---|---|
| Burton Albion | 2016–17 | Championship | 0 | 0 | — | | — | | 0 | 0 | 0 | 0 |
| Burton Albion | 2017–18 | Championship | 0 | 0 | — | | — | | 0 | 0 | 0 | 0 |
| Burton Albion | 2018–19 | League One | 0 | 0 | — | | — | | 0 | 0 | 0 | 0 |
| Burton Albion | Total | | 0 | 0 | 0 | 0 | 0 | 0 | 0 | 0 | 0 | 0 |
| Matlock Town (loan) | 2016–17 | Northern Premier League Premier Division | 40 | 23 | 1 | 0 | — | | 2 (Note: Appearance(s) in FA Trophy) | 3 | 43 | 26 |
| AFC Telford United (loan) | 2017–18 | National League North | 39 | 16 | 2 | 2 | — | | 1 | 0 | 42 | 18 |
| Hartlepool United (loan) | 2018–19 | National League | 15 | 0 | 3 | 0 | — | | 1 | 0 | 19 | 0 |
| AFC Telford United | 2018–19 | National League North | 15 | 2 | — | | — | | 0 | 0 | 15 | 2 |
| AFC Telford United | 2019–20 | National League North | 30 | 12 | 0 | 0 | — | | 1 | 0 | 31 | 12 |
| AFC Telford United | Total | | 45 | 14 | 0 | 0 | — | | 1 | 0 | 46 | 14 |
| Stevenage | 2020–21 | League Two | 6 | 1 | 1 | 0 | 0 | 0 | 2 (Note: Appearance(s) in EFL Trophy) | 1 | 9 | 2 |
| Chesterfield (loan) | 2020–21 | National League | 12 | 1 | — | | — | | 1 | 0 | 13 | 1 |
| Altrincham | 2021–22 | National League | 15 | 2 | 2 | 1 | — | | 1 | 0 | 18 | 3 |
| Altrincham | 2022–23 | National League | 24 | 5 | 2 | 2 | — | | 0 | 0 | 26 | 7 |
| Altrincham | Total | | 39 | 7 | 4 | 3 | — | | 1 | 0 | 44 | 10 |
| Kidderminster Harriers (loan) | 2021–22 | National League North | 6 | 1 | — | | — | | 0 | 0 | 6 | 1 |
| Dartford (loan) | 2021–22 | National League South | 15 | 13 | — | | — | | 1 (Note: Appearance in National League South play-offs) | 0 | 16 | 13 |
| Gateshead | 2022–23 | National League | 18 | 7 | — | | — | | 0 | 0 | 18 | 7 |
| Gateshead | 2023–24 | National League | 42 | 20 | 2 | 2 | — | | 6 | 4 | 50 | 26 |
| Gateshead | Total | | 60 | 27 | 2 | 2 | — | | 6 | 4 | 68 | 33 |
| Bromley | 2024–25 | League Two | 7 | 0 | 0 | 0 | 1 | 0 | 2 (Note: Appearance(s) in EFL Trophy) | 2 | 10 | 2 |
| Bromley | 2025–26 | League Two | 16 | 1 | 1 | 0 | 2 | 0 | 3 | 1 | 22 | 2 |
| Bromley | Total | | 23 | 1 | 1 | 0 | 3 | 0 | 5 | 1 | 32 | 4 |
| Aldershot Town | 2026–27 | National League | 0 | 0 | 0 | 0 | — | | 0 | 0 | 0 | 0 |
| Career total | | | 300 | 104 | 14 | 7 | 3 | 0 | 21 | 11 | 338 | 122 |

== Honours ==
Gateshead

- FA Trophy: 2023–24

Bromley

- EFL League Two: 2025–26

Individual

- National League Player of the Month: September 2023
