= 2025–26 Bromley F.C. season =

English football club season

Bromley
2025–26 season
- Chairman: Robin Stanton-Gleaves
- Manager: Andy Woodman
- Stadium: Hayes Lane
- League Two: 1st (Champions, Promoted)
- FA Cup: First round
- EFL Cup: Second round
- EFL Trophy: Group stage

The 2025–26 season is the 134th season in the history of Bromley Football Club and their second consecutive season in League Two. The club competed in League Two, the FA Cup, the EFL Cup and the EFL Trophy.

As champions of League Two, Bromley secured automatic promotion, and will play in League One next season.

== Squad ==
Note: Flags indicate national team as defined under FIFA eligibility rules; some limited exceptions apply. Players may hold more than one non-FIFA nationality.

No.	Pos.	Nation	Player
1	GK	ENG	Grant Smith
2	DF	ENG	Carl Jenkinson
3	DF	ENG	Zech Medley (on loan from Fleetwood Town)
4	MF	GRN	Ashley Charles
5	DF	ENG	Omar Sowunmi
6	DF	SCO	Kyle Cameron
7	MF	ENG	Ben Krauhaus (on loan from Brentford)
8	MF	ENG	Ben Thompson
9	FW	ENG	Michael Cheek
10	FW	ENG	Marcus Dinanga
11	MF	ENG	Mitch Pinnock
12	GK	SCO	Sam Long
14	FW	ENG	Nicke Kabamba
15	DF	ENG	Jesse Debrah (on loan from Port Vale)

No.	Pos.	Nation	Player
16	MF	CGO	Will Hondermarck
17	DF	ENG	Byron Webster (captain)
18	FW	ENG	Corey Whitely
20	MF	ENG	Jude Arthurs
22	DF	ENG	Lakyle Samuel (on loan from Manchester City)
25	FW	ENG	Damola Ajayi (on loan from Tottenham Hotspur)
26	MF	ENG	Marcus Ifill
30	DF	ENG	Idris Odutayo
31	DF	ENG	Brooklyn Ilunga
36	MF	ENG	George Penn
37	MF	ENG	Nathan Paul-Lavaly
38	DF	ENG	Frankie Moralee
40	FW	WAL	George Evans
41	DF	ENG	Charlie Paye

== Transfers and contracts ==
=== In ===
Date	Pos.	Player	From	Fee	Ref.
1 July 2025 (Note: The transfer was announced on 24 June, and would become official on 1 July once his contract at Notts County had expired)	CB	(Scotland) Kyle Cameron	(England) Notts County	Free	
1 July 2025 (Note: The transfer was announced on 27 June, and would become official on 1 July once his contract at Northampton had expired)	CM	(Republic of the Congo) Will Hondermarck	(England) Northampton Town	Free	
1 July 2025 (Note: The transfer was announced on 6 June, and would become official on 1 July once his contract at Northampton had expired)	LW	(England) Mitch Pinnock	(England) Northampton Town	Free	
25 July 2025	GK	(England) Dillon Addai	(England) Millwall	Free	
8 August 2025	CM	(England) Alex Stepien-Iwumene	(England) Derby County	Free	
12 August 2025	RB	(England) Freddie Taylor	(England) Brentford	Free	

=== Out ===
Date	Pos.	Player	To	Fee	Ref.
7 November 2025	CB	(England) Taylor Foran	(England) Maidstone United	Free	
25 January 2026	CB	(England) Deji Elerewe	(England) Lincoln City	Undisclosed	
30 January 2026	CF	(Republic of Ireland) Dapo Anunlopo	(England) Wolverhampton Wanderers	Free	
March 2026	LM	(England) Remy Bennison	(England) Wingate & Finchley	Free	

=== Loans in ===
Date	Pos.	Player	From	Date until	Ref.
16 July 2025	CM	(England) Ben Krauhaus	(England) Brentford	31 May 2026	
22 August 2025	CF	(England) Jemiah Umolu	(England) Crystal Palace	5 January 2026 (Note: On 5 January, Umolu's season-long loan from Crystal Palace was terminated)	
1 September 2025	RB	(England) Lakyle Samuel	(England) Manchester City	31 May 2026	
15 January 2026	RW	(England) Damola Ajayi	(England) Tottenham Hotspur	31 May 2026	
29 January 2026	CB	(England) Zech Medley	(England) Fleetwood Town	31 May 2026	
30 January 2026	CB	(England) Jesse Debrah	(England) Port Vale	31 May 2026	

=== Loans out ===
Date	Pos.	Player	To	Date until	Ref.
18 July 2025	LB	(Kosovo) Besart Topalloj	(England) Hartlepool United	3 January 2026	
22 July 2025	CB	(England) Taylor Foran	(England) Salisbury	30 September 2025 (Note: On 30 September, Foran was recalled from his half-season loan at Salisbury)	
25 July 2025	CF	(England) George Evans	(England) Welling United	29 August 2025 (Note: On 29 August, Evans and Penn were recalled from their half-season loan at Welling.)	
25 July 2025	CM	(England) George Penn	(England) Welling United	29 August 2025	
6 August 2025	CF	(England) Tade Ibrahim	(England) Kingstonian	3 September 2025	
9 August 2025	RB	(England) Nathan Paul-Lavaly	(England) Hampton & Richmond Borough	3 December 2025 (Note: On 10 September, Paul-Lavaly's loan was extended for an extra three months)	
6 September 2025	CM	(England) George Penn	(England) Salisbury	4 October 2025	
12 September 2025	GK	(England) Dillon Addai	(England) Chelmsford City	11 October 2025	
26 September 2025	CB	(England) Sam German	(England) Tonbridge Angels	18 November 2025 (Note: On 18 November, German was recalled from his loan at Tonbridge)	
4 October 2025	CB	(England) Taylor Foran	(England) Maidstone United	7 November 2025 (Note: On 7 November, Foran joined Maidstone on a permanent basis)	
10 October 2025	LM	(England) Remy Bennison	(England) Basingstoke Town	Dual-registration	
8 November 2025	W	(Gibraltar) Carlos Richards	(England) Hampton & Richmond Borough	29 December 2025	
13 November 2025	CF	(England) Tade Ibrahim	(England) Beckenham Town	13 December 2025	
20 November 2025	RB	(England) Freddie Taylor	(England) Havant & Waterlooville	31 May 2026 (Note: On 6 January, Taylor's loan at Havant & Waterlooville was extended until the end of the season)	
6 December 2025	CB	(England) Sam German	(England) Folkestone Invicta	31 May 2026 (Note: On 5 January, German's loan at Folkestone was extended for a second month. Then on 3 February it was extended further until the end of the season)	
6 December 2025	CF	(England) Soul Kader	(England) Cray Wanderers	3 January 2026	
11 December 2025	CB	(England) Josh Tobin	(England) Yeovil Town	31 May 2026	
6 January 2026	CF	(England) Soul Kader	(England) Horsham	31 May 2026	
10 January 2026	CM	(England) Alex Stepien-Iwumene	(England) Chelmsford City	13 March 2026 (Note: On 13 March, Stepien-Iwumene was recalled from his loan spell at Chelmsford City)	
16 January 2026	CF	(England) Tade Ibrahim	(England) Southall	14 February 2026	
30 January 2026	CB	(England) Frankie Moralee	(England) AFC Whyteleafe	31 May 2026	
13 February 2026	GK	(England) Harry Haines	(England) Hastings United	31 May 2026	
13 February 2026	CM	(England) Jedd Hobbs	(England) Hastings United	31 May 2026	
14 February 2026	CF	(England) George Evans	(England) Faversham Town	14 March 2026	
14 March 2026	CF	(England) Tade Ibrahim	(England) VCD Athletic	31 May 2026	

=== Released / out of contract ===
Date	Pos.	Player	Subsequent club	Join date	Ref.
26 June 2025	DM	(England) Lewis Leigh	(England) Chester	16 October 2025	
30 June 2025	GK	(England) David Aziaya	(England) Sutton United	1 July 2025	
30 June 2025	LW	(England) Louis Dennis	(England) Torquay United	1 July 2025	
30 June 2025	RW	(England) Harry McKirdy	(England) Crawley Town	1 July 2025	
30 June 2025	RW	(Antigua and Barbuda) Myles Weston	(England) Hornchurch	1 August 2025	
30 June 2025	LB	(Antigua and Barbuda) Antonio Morgan	(England) Tonbridge Angels	1 July 2025	
30 June 2025	RW	(England) Olufela Olomola	(England) Wealdstone	24 September 2025	
30 June 2025	CM	(England) Callum Corbin	(England) East Grinstead Town	September 2025	
2 January 2026	LB	(Kosovo) Besart Topalloj	(England) Sutton United	7 January 2026	
27 February 2026	CM	(England) George Penn			

=== New contract ===
Date	Pos.	Player	Length	End date	Ref.

== Pre-season and friendlies ==
On 16 May, Bromley announced their first pre-season friendly, against Millwall. Ten days later, a second fixture was added to the schedule, against Sutton United. The current FA Cup winners, Crystal Palace was next to added to the pre-season preparations. On 29 May 2025, it was confirmed that a Bromley XI side would travel to face Tonbridge Angels. A day later, a fifth fixture was announced against Chelsea XI. An XI side would also travel to face Cray Wanderers and Faversham Town. On 12 June, a warm-weather training camp in Portugal, along with a fixtures against Rotherham United and Lincoln City was announced. Four days later, it was announced a Tottenham Hotspur XI side would also visit during pre-season.

Win Draw Loss Fixtures

5 July 2025 Friendly	Bromley	Cancelled	Sutton United	Bromley
15:00 BST				Stadium: Hayes Lane
Note: Fixture was cancelled due to unforeseen football reasons.

8 July 2025 Friendly	Faversham Town	v	Bromley XI	Faversham
19:30 BST				Stadium: Salters Lane

8 July 2025 Friendly	Bromley	5–2	Tottenham Hotspur XI	Bromley
19:45 BST	Kader 39'; Dinanga 52', 57', 64', 80'	Report	Russell-Denny 14' (pen.); Hall 16'	Stadium: Hayes Lane

11 July 2025 Friendly	Bromley	1–2	Rotherham United	Albufeira, Portugal
11:00 WEST	Cheek 42'	Report	Hugill 15'; Trialist 45+1'	Stadium: Estadio Da Nora

16 July 2025 Friendly	Bromley	4–3	Lincoln City	Albufeira, Portugal
11:00 WEST	Thompson 13', 54'; Dinanga 38'; Kabamba 114'	Report	Moylan 48'; Hamer 99'; Towler 103'	Stadium: Estadio Da Nora

18 July 2025 Friendly	Cray Wanderers	2–2	Bromley XI	Chislehurst
19:45 BST	Adaja 12'; Sutton 36'	Report	Patten 43'; Penn 69'	Stadium: Flamingo Park; Attendance: 302; Referee: Joel Tilmouth

19 July 2025 Friendly	Bromley	2–1	Chelsea XI	Bromley
15:00 BST	Sowunmi 23'; Ifill 44'	Report	Kavuma-McQueen 17'	Stadium: Hayes Lane

22 July 2025 Friendly	Bromley	2–2	Crystal Palace XI	Bromley
19:45 BST	Cheek 17', 26' (pen.)	Report	Umolu 11'; March 70'	Stadium: Hayes Lane

22 July 2025 Friendly	Tonbridge Angels	v	Bromley XI	Tonbridge
19:45 BST				Stadium: Longmead Stadium

26 July 2025 Friendly	Bromley	1–2	Millwall	Bromley
15:00 BST	Odutayo 90+2'	Report	Bangura-Williams 49'; Ivanović 60'	Stadium: Hayes Lane

== Competitions ==
=== Overall record ===
Competition	First match	Last match	Starting round	Final position	Record							
Competition	First match	Last match	Starting round	Final position	Pld	W	D	L	GF	GA	GD	Win %
EFL League Two	2 August 2025	2 May 2026	Matchday 1	Winners	46	24	15	7	71	46	+25	52.17
FA Cup	1 November 2025		First round	First round	1	0	0	1	1	2	−1	0.00
EFL Cup	12 August 2025	26 August 2025	First round	Second round	2	1	0	1	2	2	+0	50.00
EFL Trophy	2 September 2025	11 November 2025	Group stage	Group stage	3	1	0	2	5	7	−2	33.33
Total					52	26	15	11	79	57	+22	50.00

Last updated: 2 May 2026
Source: Soccerway

=== EFL League Two ===
==== League table ====
Pos	Team	Pld	W	D	L	GF	GA	GD	Pts	Promotion, qualification or relegation
1	Bromley (C, P)	46	24	15	7	71	46	+25	87	Promotion to EFL League One
2	Milton Keynes Dons (P)	46	24	14	8	86	45	+41	86	Promotion to EFL League One
3	Cambridge United (P)	46	22	16	8	66	33	+33	82	Promotion to EFL League One
4	Salford City	46	25	6	15	61	51	+10	81	Qualification for League Two play-offs
5	Notts County (O, P)	46	24	8	14	74	52	+22	80	Qualification for League Two play-offs

Source: EFL Official Website
Rules for classification: 1) Points; 2) Goal difference; 3) Number of goals scored; 4) Head-to-head results; 5) Wins; 6) Away goals; 7) Penalty points (sec 9.5); 8) 12-point sending off offences
(C) Champions; (O) Play-off winners; (P) Promoted

==== Results summary ====
Overall								Home						Away					
Pld	W	D	L	GF	GA	GD	Pts	W	D	L	GF	GA	GD	W	D	L	GF	GA	GD
46	24	15	7	71	46	+25	87	14	9	0	41	21	+20	10	6	7	30	25	+5

Source: Soccerway

==== Results by round ====
Round	1	2	3	4	5	6	7	8	9	10	11	12	13	14	15	16	17	18	19	20	21	22	23	24	26	27	28	29	30	31	32	33	34	35	25^{1}	36	37	38	39	40	41	42	43	44	45	46
Ground	A	H	H	A	A	H	H	A	H	A	H	A	A	H	A	H	H	A	H	A	H	A	A	H	A	A	H	H	A	A	H	H	A	H	H	A	H	A	H	A	A	H	A	H	A	H
Result	D	W	D	W	D	W	D	L	D	L	D	W	L	W	W	W	W	L	W	W	W	W	W	W	W	D	W	D	W	W	D	D	D	W	D	D	W	W	W	L	D	W	L	D	L	W
Position	14	6	11	7	6	3	5	7	8	14	13	10	13	11	9	5	3	5	4	4	3	2	1	1	1	1	1	1	1	1	1	1	1	1	1	1	1	1	1	1	1	1	1	1	2	1
Points	1	4	5	8	9	12	13	13	14	14	15	18	18	21	24	27	30	30	33	36	39	42	45	48	51	52	55	56	59	62	63	64	65	68	69	70	73	76	79	79	80	83	83	84	84	87

Source: EFL
A = Away; H = Home; W = Win; D = Draw; L = Loss; P = Postponed
Notes:
- ^{1} Matchday 25 (vs. Oldham Athletic) was postponed due to a frozen pitch.

==== Matches ====
The League Two fixtures were released on 26 June 2025.

Win Draw Loss Fixtures

2 August 2025 1	Shrewsbury Town	0–0	Bromley	Shrewsbury
15:00 BST	Clucas (yellow card) 45+6'; Boyle (yellow card) 48'; Anderson (yellow card) 57'	Report	Elerewe (yellow card) 45+17'	Stadium: New Meadow; Attendance: 5,809 (280 away); Referee: Zac Kennard-Kettle

9 August 2025 2	Bromley	2–0	Barnet	Bromley
15:00 BST	Ifill (yellow card) 31'; Cheek 36'; Webster (yellow card) 78'; Pinnock (yellow card) 82'; Kabamba 90+5'	Report	Crichlow (yellow card) 35'	Stadium: Hayes Lane; Attendance: 2,130 (431 away); Referee: Lee Swabey

16 August 2025 3	Bromley	2–2	Fleetwood Town	Bromley
15:00 BST	Dinanga 30'; Pinnock (yellow card) 42'; Charles (yellow card) 64'; Kabamba 73'; Hondermarck (yellow card) 85'; Webster (yellow card) 90+4'	Report	Bolton 8'; Neal (yellow card) 57'; Norwood 90+3'; Evans (yellow card) 90+4'	Stadium: Hayes Lane; Attendance: 1,472 (56 away); Referee: Oliver Mackey

19 August 2025 4	Cheltenham Town	1–2	Bromley	Cheltenham
19:45 BST	Martin 73'; Angol (yellow card) 90+3'	Report	Sowunmi 14'; Ifill (yellow card) 56'; Cheek 71' (pen.); Hondermarck (yellow card) 90+2'; Smith (yellow card) 90+4'	Stadium: Whaddon Road; Attendance: 3,016 (122 away); Referee: Robert Massey-Ellis

23 August 2025 5	Notts County	2–2	Bromley	Nottingham
15:00 BST	Dennis 11', 31'; Bedeau (yellow card) 85'	Report	Arthurs (yellow card) 9'; Thompson 18'; Sowunmi (yellow card) 30'; Odutayo (yellow card) 36', (goal) 83'; Pinnock (yellow card) 83'	Stadium: Meadow Lane; Attendance: 8,829 (177 away); Referee: Tom Reeves

30 August 2025 6	Bromley	2–0	Harrogate Town	Bromley
15:00 BST	Kabamba 74'; Sowunmi 80'; Krauhaus (yellow card) 88'; Charles (yellow card) 90+4'	Report	Duke-McKenna (yellow card) 49'; Morris (yellow card) 79'	Stadium: Hayes Lane; Attendance: 2,340 (106 away); Referee: Alan Young

6 September 2025 7	Bromley	2–2	Gillingham	Bromley
17:30 BST	Kabamba 7', (yellow card) 67'; Cheek 12'; Charles (yellow card) 90+12'	Report	Nevitt (yellow card) 45'; Andrews 56'; Gale (yellow card) 84'; Clark 90+8' (pen.)	Stadium: Hayes Lane; Attendance: 3,005 (481 away); Referee: James Durkin
Note: Fixture was initially scheduled for a 15:00 kick-off, but was moved for live Sky Sports broadcast.

13 September 2025 8	Oldham Athletic	1–0	Bromley	Oldham
15:00 BST	Monthé (yellow card) 43'; Fondop (yellow card) 59', (goal) 82'	Report	Cameron (yellow card) 40'	Stadium: Boundary Park; Attendance: 6,714 (122 away); Referee: Richard Eley

20 September 2025 9	Bromley	2–2	Chesterfield	Bromley
15:00 BST	Cheek 16'; Krauhaus (yellow card) 53'; Dunkley 79' (o.g.); Odutayo (yellow card) 90'	Report	Daley-Campbell (yellow card) 22'; Naylor (yellow card) 33'; Dobra 39'; Mandeville 67'; Darcy (yellow card) 69'	Stadium: Hayes Lane; Attendance: 2,583 (341 away); Referee: Carl Brook

27 September 2025 10	Swindon Town	2–0	Bromley	Swindon
15:00 BST	Palmer 7'; Drinan 31', (yellow card) 83'; Knight-Lebel (yellow card) 64'	Report	Charles (yellow card) 88'	Stadium: County Ground; Attendance: 7,879 (241 away); Referee: Abigail Byrne

4 October 2025 11	Bromley	3–3	Tranmere Rovers	Bromley
15:00 BST	Cameron 16', (yellow card) 20'; Kabamba 37'; Cheek 49' (pen.); Webster (red card) 71'; Arthurs (yellow card) 72'	Report	Smallwood (yellow card) 20'; Smith 27'; Murphy (yellow card) 38'; Davison (yellow card) 41'; Patrick 50'; Brough (yellow card) 54'; Norman 60'	Stadium: Hayes Lane; Attendance: 3,589 (368 away); Referee: James Oldham

11 October 2025 12	Crewe Alexandra	0–1	Bromley	Crewe
15:00 BST	Demetriou (yellow card) 90+1'; Lunt (yellow card) 90+5'	Report	Krauhaus (yellow card) 16'; Thompson (yellow card) 38'; Cheek 52'	Stadium: Gresty Road; Attendance: 5,091 (250 away); Referee: Aaron Bannister

18 October 2025 13	Cambridge United	2–1	Bromley	Cambridge
12:30 BST	Lavery 2', (yellow card) 62'; Kouassi 41'; Mpanzu (yellow card) 55'	Report	Samuel (yellow card) 17'; Cheek 50'	Stadium: Abbey Stadium; Attendance: 5,839 (427 away); Referee: Declan Bourne
Note: Fixture was initially scheduled for a 15:00 kick-off, but was moved for live Sky Sports broadcast.

25 October 2025 14	Bromley	2–1	Milton Keynes Dons	Bromley
15:00 BST	Odutayo (yellow card) 43'; Elerewe 73'; Sowunmi 81'	Report	Hepburn-Murphy 5'	Stadium: Hayes Lane; Attendance: 3,694 (360 away); Referee: Kirsty Dowle

8 November 2025 15	Colchester United	0–2	Bromley	Colchester
12:30 GMT	Iandolo (yellow card) 31'; Read (yellow card) 81'	Report	Hondermarck (yellow card) 55'; Ifill (yellow card) 60'; Sowunmi 74'; Cheek 78'; Kabamba (yellow card) 86'	Stadium: Colchester Community Stadium; Attendance: 5,169 (412 away); Referee: Andrew Humphries
Note: Fixture was initially scheduled for a 15:00 kick-off, but was moved for live Sky Sports broadcast.

15 November 2025 16	Bromley	2–1	Barrow	Bromley
15:00 GMT	Ifill 32'; Whitely (yellow card) 45'; Kabamba 88'	Report	Whitfield 50'; Raglan (yellow card) 72'; Canavan (yellow card) 78'	Stadium: Hayes Lane; Attendance: 3,903 (148 away); Referee: Stephen Parkinson

22 November 2025 17	Bromley	2–0	Salford City	Bromley
15:00 GMT	Sowunmi 24'; Hondermarck 32'	Report	Grant (yellow card) 45'; Butcher (yellow card) 78'	Stadium: Hayes Lane; Attendance: 3,771 (68 away); Referee: Matthew Russell

29 November 2025 18	Walsall	3–1	Bromley	Walsall
15:00 GMT	Kanu 64'; Matt (yellow card) 64'; Finnigan 80'; Clarke 90+10'	Report	Charles (yellow card) 12'; Krauhaus 18'; Ifill (yellow card) 63'; Sowunmi (yellow card) 64'	Stadium: Bescot Stadium; Attendance: 7,228 (208 away); Referee: Michael Barlow

9 December 2025 19	Bromley	3–1	Crawley Town	Bromley
19:45 GMT	Sowunmi 43'; Odutayo 49'; Cheek 69'; Arthurs (yellow card) 86'; Ifill (yellow card) 90+4'	Report	Loft 9'; Adeyemo (yellow card) 25'; Bajrami (yellow card) 90+3'	Stadium: Hayes Lane; Attendance: 3,544 (550 away); Referee: David Rock

13 December 2025 20	Accrington Stanley	0–1	Bromley	Accrington
15:00 GMT	Conneely (yellow card) 73'	Report	Hondermarck (yellow card) 45+1'; Elerewe (yellow card) 65', (goal) 89'; Odutayo (yellow card) 89'	Stadium: Crown Ground; Attendance: 1,669 (137 away); Referee: Steven Copeland

20 December 2025 21	Bromley	2–0	Grimsby Town	Bromley
12:30 GMT	Hondermarck 12', 55'; Charles (yellow card) 62'; Pinnock (yellow card) 71'	Report	Walker (yellow card) 38'; McEachran (yellow card) 45+3'; McJannet (yellow card) 84'	Stadium: Hayes Lane; Attendance: 4,427 (556 away); Referee: James Durkin
Note: Fixture was initially scheduled for a 15:00 kick-off, but was moved for live Sky Sports broadcast.

26 December 2025 22	Bristol Rovers	2–3	Bromley	Bristol
15:00 GMT	Forde (yellow card) 12' (yellow-red card) 53'; Sparkes 34'; Cavegn 40', (yellow card) 90+4'; Cotterill (yellow card) 46'	Report	Kabamba 68', (yellow card) 70'; Thompson 81', 90+2'	Stadium: Memorial Stadium; Attendance: 8,127 (167 away); Referee: Jacob Miles

29 December 2025 23	Crawley Town	1–3	Bromley	Crawley
19:45 GMT	Barker 43', (yellow card) 70'	Report	Cheek 14', 56', 61'; Krauhaus (yellow card) 38'	Stadium: Broadfield Stadium; Attendance: 4,058 (1,004 away); Referee: Ben Toner

1 January 2026 24	Bromley	2–1	Newport County	Bromley
15:00 GMT	Baker-Richardson 45+3' (o.g.); Charles (yellow card) 52'; Kabamba 74'; Ifill (yellow card) 86'	Report	Opoku 87'; Baker (yellow card) 90'	Stadium: Hayes Lane; Attendance: 4,946 (203 away); Referee: Kirsty Dowle

10 January 2026 26	Tranmere Rovers	0–2	Bromley	Birkenhead
15:00 GMT	Ironside (yellow card) 15'; Brough (yellow card) 49'	Report	Cheek 2', 57', (yellow card) 59'; Odutayo (yellow card) 41'; Hondermarck (yellow card) 73'	Stadium: Prenton Park; Attendance: 5,930 (104 away); Referee: Martin Woods

17 January 2026 27	Chesterfield	0–0	Bromley	Chesterfield
12:30 GMT	Curtis (yellow card) 45+4'; Duffy (yellow card) 88'	Report	Kabamba (penalty missed) 89'	Stadium: SMH Group Stadium; Attendance: 7,432 (148 away); Referee: Alex Chilowicz
Note: Fixture was initially scheduled for a 15:00 kick-off, but was moved for live Sky Sports broadcast.

24 January 2026 28	Bromley	2–1	Swindon Town	Bromley
15:00 GMT	Arthurs (yellow card) 45+2'; Charles 46'; Kabamba 89'; Smith (yellow card) 90+5'	Report	Holman 10'	Stadium: Hayes Lane; Attendance: 5,505 (580 away); Referee: James Oldham

27 January 2026 29	Bromley	2–2	Crewe Alexandra	Bromley
19:45 GMT	Whitely 31'; Charles (yellow card) 58'; Thompson 70'; Sowunmi (yellow card) 76'	Report	Pond (yellow card) 21', (goal) 54'; Holíček (yellow card) 74'; March (yellow card) 76'; Demetriou 90+4'; Sanders (yellow card) 90+6'	Stadium: Hayes Lane; Attendance: 3,618 (157 away); Referee: Aaron Farmer

31 January 2026 30	Gillingham	1–4	Bromley	Gillingham
15:00 GMT	Little (yellow card) 6'; Dack 44'	Report	Thompson 10', 19', 48'; Whitely 27', (yellow card) 45+2'; Pinnock (yellow card) 27'; Medley (yellow card) 89'	Stadium: Priestfield Stadium; Attendance: 8,164 (1,313 away); Referee: Alan Young

7 February 2026 31	Fleetwood Town	1–2	Bromley	Fleetwood
15:00 GMT	Helm 64'; Mullarkey (yellow card) 80'; Haughey (yellow card) 90'	Report	Hondermarck (yellow card) 5'; Kabamba 68'; Arthurs (yellow card) 90', (goal) 90+1'	Stadium: Highbury Stadium; Attendance: 2,409 (93 away); Referee: Neil Hair

14 February 2026 32	Bromley	1–1	Notts County	Bromley
15:00 GMT	Dennis 28' (o.g.)	Report	Jones 52' (pen.); Robertson (yellow card) 60' (yellow-red card) 83'; Bedeau (yellow card) 61'	Stadium: Hayes Lane; Attendance: 5,316 (575 away); Referee: Darren Drysdale

17 February 2026 33	Bromley	1–1	Cheltenham Town	Bromley
19:45 GMT	Pinnock 4'; Hondermarck (yellow card) 49'; Smith (yellow card) 71'; Odutayo (yellow card) 80'	Report	Hutchinson 25', (yellow card) 71'; Wilson (yellow card) 55'	Stadium: Hayes Lane; Attendance: 3,859 (140 away); Referee: Elliott Swallow

21 February 2026 34	Harrogate Town	0–0	Bromley	Harrogate
15:00 GMT	Gibson (yellow card) 31'	Report	Odutayo (yellow card) 50'; Jenkinson (yellow card) 84'	Stadium: Wetherby Road; Attendance: 2,822 (307 away); Referee: Scott Oldham

28 February 2026 35	Bromley	2–1	Accrington Stanley	Bromley
15:00 GMT	Arthurs (yellow card) 1'; Cheek 45+1' (pen.), 52' (pen.)	Report	Love (red card) 14'; Madden (yellow card) 45'; Abimbola 45+3'	Stadium: Hayes Lane; Attendance: 4,307 (87 away); Referee: Andrew Humphries

3 March 2026 25	Bromley	0–0	Oldham Athletic	Bromley
19:45 GMT	Charles (yellow card) 22'; Debrah (yellow card) 36'; Odutayo (yellow card) 74'	Report	Robson (yellow card) 66'	Stadium: Hayes Lane; Attendance: 4,254 (252 away); Referee: Ross Martin
Note: Fixture was initially scheduled for 4 January, but was postponed due to a frozen pitch.

7 March 2026 36	Grimsby Town	1–1	Bromley	Cleethorpes
12:30 GMT	Vernam 31' (pen.)	Report	Krauhaus (yellow card) 10'; Kabamba 28'; Arthurs (yellow card) 35'	Stadium: Blundell Park; Attendance: 6,777 (128 away); Referee: Seb Stockbridge
Note: Fixture was initially scheduled for a 15:00 kick-off, but was moved for live Sky Sports broadcast.

14 March 2026 37	Bromley	1–0	Bristol Rovers	Bromley
15:00 GMT	Hondermarck 18'; Pinnock (yellow card) 88'	Report	Forde (yellow card) 50' (yellow-red card) 81'	Stadium: Hayes Lane; Attendance: 4,535 (594 away); Referee: Elliot Bell

17 March 2026 38	Newport County	0–1	Bromley	Newport
19:30 GMT	Biggins (yellow card) 90+6'	Report	Debrah (yellow card) 24'; Arthurs (yellow card) 55'; Whitely 88'; Sowunmi (yellow card) 90+6'	Stadium: Rodney Parade; Attendance: 3,530 (162 away); Referee: Paul Howard

21 March 2026 39	Bromley	1–0	Colchester United	Bromley
15:00 GMT	Kabamba 73'; Ajayi (yellow card) 86'; Hondermarck (yellow card) 90+3'	Report	Flanagan (yellow card) 55'; Iandolo (yellow card) 65'; Tovide (yellow card) 84'	Stadium: Hayes Lane; Attendance: 4,722 (530 away); Referee: Ollie Yates

28 March 2026 40	Barrow	2–1	Bromley	Barrow-in-Furness
15:00 GMT	Harper (yellow card) 34'; Rose (yellow card) 45', (goal) 67'; Gordon 56'; Canavan (yellow card) 90+6'	Report	Hondermarck (yellow card) 19'; Charles 35', (yellow card) 77'; Whitely (yellow card) 61'	Stadium: Holker Street; Attendance: 2,303 (149 away); Referee: Bobby Madley

3 April 2026 41	Barnet	2–2	Bromley	Edgware
15:00 BST	Chinedu 18'; Collinge (red card) 69'; Tshimanga 76' (pen.); Tavares (yellow card) 90+12'	Report	Kabamba 12'; Hondermarck (yellow card) 49'; Cameron (yellow card) 74'; Smith (yellow card) 76'; Ajayi (yellow card) 87'; Evans 90+11'	Stadium: The Hive Stadium; Attendance: 3,903 (1,352 away); Referee: David Rock

7 April 2026 42	Bromley	2–1	Shrewsbury Town	Bromley
20:00 BST	Ifill 38'; Cameron 49'	Report	Ihionvien 6', (yellow card) 45+1'; Berkoe (yellow card) 48'; Stubbs (yellow card) 84'	Stadium: Hayes Lane; Attendance: 4,780 (307 away); Referee: Abigail Byrne
Note: Fixture was initially scheduled for 6 April, but was moved for Sky Sports broadcast.

11 April 2026 43	Milton Keynes Dons	2–1	Bromley	Milton Keynes
12:30 BST	Mendez-Laing 1'; Wiles 16'; Nelson (yellow card) 18'; Mellish (yellow card) 66' (yellow-red card) 67'	Report	Sowunmi (yellow card) 67'; Medley (yellow card) 71'; Ifill 74'; Arthurs (yellow card) 86'	Stadium: Stadium MK; Attendance: 9,824 (1,067 away); Referee: Will Finnie
Note: Fixture was initially scheduled for a 15:00 kick-off, but was moved for Sky Sports broadcast.

16 April 2026 44	Bromley	0–0	Cambridge United	Bromley
20:00 BST	Sowunmi (yellow card) 90+3'	Report	Ball (yellow card) 47'; Smith (yellow card) 90+1'	Stadium: Hayes Lane; Attendance: 5,439 (519 away); Referee: Sam Mulhall
Note: Fixture was initially scheduled for 18 April, but was moved for live Sky Sports broadcast.

23 April 2026 45	Salford City	2–0	Bromley	Salford
20:00 BST	Turton (yellow card) 12', (goal) 76'; Grant 52'; Young (yellow card) 90+8'	Report	Webster (yellow card) 39'	Stadium: Moor Lane; Attendance: 3,473 (288 away); Referee: Andrew Humphries
Note: Fixture was initially scheduled for 25 April, but was moved for live Sky Sports broadcast.

2 May 2026 46	Bromley	3–1	Walsall	Bromley
15:00 BST	Thompson 37'; Pinnock 60'; Sowunmi 67'	Report	Łopata (yellow card) 30'; Hancock (yellow card) 33'; Flint (yellow card) 35'; Okeke 62'; Jellis (yellow card) 88'	Stadium: Hayes Lane; Attendance: 5,452 (511 away); Referee: Scott Jackson

=== FA Cup ===
Bromley were drawn at home to Bristol Rovers in the first round.

Win Draw Loss Fixtures

1 November 2025 First round	Bromley	1–2	Bristol Rovers	Bromley
15:00 GMT	Charles (yellow card) 54'; Umolu 83'	Report	Negru (yellow card) 37'; Cavegn 76', (yellow card) 78'; Cotterill 79'; Southwood (yellow card) 90+12'; Moore (yellow card) 90+14'	Stadium: Hayes Lane; Attendance: 2,500 (307 away); Referee: Isaac Searle

=== EFL Cup ===
Bromley were drawn at home to Ipswich Town in the first round and to Wycombe Wanderers in the second round.

Win Draw Loss Fixtures

12 August 2025 First round	Bromley	1–1 (5–4 p)	Ipswich Town	Bromley
20:00 BST	Elerewe 45'; Pinnock (yellow card) 60'	Report	Johnson 53'	Stadium: Hayes Lane; Attendance: 3,005 (481 away); Referee: Matthew Russell
	Penalties
	Cheek (penalty scored); Charles (penalty missed); Arthurs (penalty scored); Odutayo (penalty scored); Pinncock (penalty scored); Ifill (penalty scored)		(penalty missed) Hirst; (penalty scored) Szmodics; (penalty scored) Johnson; (penalty scored) Young; (penalty scored) Chaplin; (penalty missed) Al-Hamadi

26 August 2025 Second round	Bromley	1–1 (5–6 p)	Wycombe Wanderers	Bromley
19:45 BST	Arthurs 35'	Report	Westergaard 5'	Stadium: Hayes Lane; Attendance: 2,310 (339 away); Referee: Thomas Parsons
	Penalties
	Cheek (penalty scored); Arthurs (penalty missed); Odutayo (penalty scored); Ifill (penalty scored); Webster (penalty missed); Cameron (penalty scored); Hondermarck (penalty missed)		(penalty scored) Boyd-Munce; (penalty missed) Savage; (penalty scored) Hartridge; (penalty scored) Lowry; (penalty missed) Westergaard; (penalty scored) Back; (penalty scored) Stones

=== EFL Trophy ===
Bromley were drawn against AFC Wimbledon, Stevenage and Crystal Palace U21 in the group stage.

Pos	Div	Team	Pld	W	PW	PL	L	GF	GA	GD	Pts	Qualification
1	L1	Stevenage	3	3	0	0	0	12	4	+8	9	Advance to Round 2
2	L1	AFC Wimbledon	3	2	0	0	1	6	7	−1	6	Advance to Round 2
3	L2	Bromley	3	0	1	0	2	5	7	−2	2	
4	ACA	Crystal Palace U21	3	0	0	1	2	6	11	−5	1	

Source: EFL

Win Draw Loss Fixtures

2 September 2025 South Group E	Bromley	3–3 (4–3 p)	Crystal Palace U21	Bromley
19:45 BST	Krauhaus 31'; Elerewe 42'; Dinanga 69'; Taylor (yellow card) 78'; Hondermarck (yellow card) 84'; Penn (yellow card) 90+2'	Report	Marsh 27', 88'; Nascimento 35'	Stadium: Hayes Lane; Attendance: 554; Referee: Aaron Farmer
	Penalties
	Long (penalty missed); Arthurs (penalty scored); Dinanga (penalty scored); Stepien-Iwumene (penalty scored); Odutayo (penalty scored)		(penalty missed) Marsh; (penalty scored) Nascimento; (penalty scored) Rodney; (penalty scored) Reid; (penalty missed) Browne

7 October 2025 South Group E	Stevenage	2–1	Bromley	Stevenage
19:00 BST	Earley (yellow card) 2'; White 21'; Ahadme 83'	Report	Stepien-Iwumene (yellow card) 45+4'; Webster 68'	Stadium: Broadhall Way; Attendance: 816; Referee: Elliott Swallow

11 November 2025 South Group E	Bromley	1–2	AFC Wimbledon	Bromley
19:00 GMT	Odutayo 33'	Report	Hackford 14'; Smith (yellow card) 21'; Lewis (yellow card) 45'; Browne 73'; Harbottle (yellow card) 88'	Stadium: Hayes Lane; Attendance: 1,551; Referee: Paul Howard

== Statistics ==
=== Appearances ===
As of match played 22 April 2026

Players with no appearances are not included on the list; italics indicate a loaned in player

No.	Pos	Nat	Player	Total		League Two		FA Cup		EFL Cup		EFL Trophy	
No.	Pos	Nat	Player	Apps	Goals	Apps	Goals	Apps	Goals	Apps	Goals	Apps	Goals
1	GK	(England) ENG	Grant Smith	43	0	42+0	0	1+0	0	0+0	0	0+0	0
2	DF	(England) ENG	Carl Jenkinson	5	0	2+3	0	0+0	0	0+0	0	0+0	0
3	DF	(England) ENG	Zech Medley	9	0	7+2	0	0+0	0	0+0	0	0+0	0
4	MF	(Grenada) GRN	Ashley Charles	47	2	42+2	2	1+0	0	1+1	0	0+0	0
5	DF	(England) ENG	Omar Sowunmi	44	6	37+2	6	1+0	0	2+0	0	0+2	0
6	DF	(Scotland) SCO	Kyle Cameron	21	2	17+1	2	0+0	0	1+0	0	2+0	0
7	MF	(England) ENG	Ben Krauhaus	39	2	23+10	1	0+1	0	2+0	0	3+0	1
8	MF	(England) ENG	Ben Thompson	37	7	11+22	7	0+1	0	1+0	0	2+0	0
9	FW	(England) ENG	Michael Cheek	38	16	35+0	16	1+0	0	0+2	0	0+0	0
10	FW	(England) ENG	Marcus Dinanga	22	2	4+12	1	1+0	0	2+0	0	1+2	1
11	FW	(England) ENG	Mitch Pinnock	48	1	45+0	1	1+0	0	2+0	0	0+0	0
12	GK	(Scotland) SCO	Sam Long	8	0	3+0	0	0+0	0	2+0	0	3+0	0
14	FW	(Democratic Republic of the Congo) COD	Nicke Kabamba	50	13	19+26	13	0+0	0	2+0	0	2+1	0
15	DF	(England) ENG	Jesse Debrah	11	0	11+0	0	0+0	0	0+0	0	0+0	0
16	MF	(Republic of the Congo) CGO	Will Hondermarck	46	4	28+13	4	1+0	0	0+2	0	0+2	0
17	DF	(England) ENG	Byron Webster	14	1	7+3	0	0+0	0	1+0	0	2+1	1
18	FW	(England) ENG	Corey Whitely	44	3	36+4	3	0+1	0	0+0	0	3+0	0
20	MF	(England) ENG	Jude Arthurs	48	2	24+18	1	1+0	0	2+0	1	2+1	0
22	DF	(England) ENG	Lakyle Samuel	7	0	5+1	0	1+0	0	0+0	0	0+0	0
24	FW	(England) ENG	Soul Kader	1	0	0+0	0	0+0	0	0+1	0	0+0	0
25	FW	(England) ENG	Damola Ajayi	11	0	4+7	0	0+0	0	0+0	0	0+0	0
26	FW	(England) ENG	Marcus Ifill	42	3	37+2	3	0+0	0	2+0	0	1+0	0
28	DF	(England) ENG	Sam German	1	0	0+0	0	0+0	0	0+0	0	1+0	0
29	DF	(England) ENG	Josh Tobin	1	0	0+0	0	0+0	0	0+0	0	0+1	0
30	DF	(England) ENG	Idris Odutayo	50	3	39+5	2	1+0	0	1+1	0	2+1	1
31	DF	(England) ENG	Brooklyn Ilunga	30	0	0+26	0	0+1	0	0+0	0	3+0	0
34	MF	(England) ENG	Alex Stepien-Iwumene	5	0	0+2	0	0+0	0	0+0	0	3+0	0
36	MF	(England) ENG	George Penn	1	0	0+0	0	0+0	0	0+0	0	0+1	0
40	FW	(England) ENG	George Evans	4	1	0+4	1	0+0	0	0+0	0	0+0	0
42	DF	(England) ENG	Freddie Taylor	1	0	0+0	0	0+0	0	0+0	0	1+0	0
Players who featured but departed the club during the season:
3	DF	(England) ENG	Deji Elerewe	23	4	17+2	2	1+0	0	1+0	1	2+0	1
19	FW	(England) ENG	Jemiah Umolu	5	1	0+1	0	0+1	1	0+1	0	0+2	0

=== Goals ===
As of match played 23 April 2026

Rank	Pos.	No.	Player	League Two	FA Cup	EFL Cup	EFL Trophy	Total
1	FW	9	(England) Michael Cheek	16	0	0	0	16
2	FW	14	(England) Nicke Kabamba	13	0	0	0	13
3	MF	8	(England) Ben Thompson	7	0	0	0	7
4	DF	5	(England) Omar Sowunmi	6	0	0	0	6
5	DF	3	(England) Deji Elerewe	2	0	1	1	4
5	MF	16	(Republic of the Congo) Will Hondermarck	4	0	0	0	4
7	FW	18	(England) Corey Whitely	3	0	0	0	3
7	FW	26	(England) Marcus Ifill	3	0	0	0	3
7	DF	30	(England) Idris Odutayo	2	0	0	1	3
7	Own goals			3	0	0	0	3
11	MF	4	(Grenada) Ashely Charles	2	0	0	0	2
11	DF	6	(Scotland) Kyle Cameron	2	0	0	0	2
11	MF	7	(England) Ben Krauhaus	1	0	0	1	2
11	FW	10	(England) Marcus Dinanga	1	0	0	1	2
11	MF	20	(England) Jude Arthurs	1	0	1	0	2
16	FW	11	(England) Mitch Pinnock	1	0	0	0	1
16	DF	17	(England) Byron Webster	0	0	0	1	1
16	FW	19	(England) Jemiah Umolu	0	1	0	0	1
16	FW	40	(England) George Evans	1	0	0	0	1
Total				68	1	2	5	76

=== Clean sheets ===
As of match played 23 April 2026

No.	Player	League Two	FA Cup	EFL Cup	EFL Trophy	Total
1	(England) Grant Smith	15	0	0	0	15
2	(England) Sam Long	1	0	0	0	1
Total		16	0	0	0	16

=== Disciplinary record ===
As of match played 23 April 2026

Rank	No.	Pos.	Player	League Two			FA Cup			EFL Cup			EFL Trophy			Total		
Rank	No.	Pos.	Player	Yellow card	(yellow card) (yellow-red card)	Red card	Yellow card	(yellow card) (yellow-red card)	Red card	Yellow card	(yellow card) (yellow-red card)	Red card	Yellow card	(yellow card) (yellow-red card)	Red card	Yellow card	(yellow card) (yellow-red card)	Red card
1	4	MF	(Grenada) Ashley Charles	10	0	0	1	0	0	0	0	0	0	0	0	11	0	0
1	16	MF	(Republic of the Congo) Will Hondermarck	10	0	0	0	0	0	0	0	0	1	0	0	11	0	0
3	20	MF	(England) Jude Arthurs	9	0	0	0	0	0	0	0	0	0	0	0	9	0	0
4	11	MF	(England) Mitch Pinnock	6	0	0	0	0	0	1	0	0	0	0	0	7	0	0
4	17	DF	(England) Byron Webster	3	0	1	0	0	0	0	0	0	1	0	0	4	0	1
6	26	DF	(England) Marcus Ifill	6	0	0	0	0	0	0	0	0	0	0	0	6	0	0
6	30	DF	(England) Idris Odutayo	6	0	0	0	0	0	0	0	0	0	0	0	6	0	0
8	5	DF	(England) Omar Sowunmi	5	0	0	0	0	0	0	0	0	0	0	0	5	0	0
8	7	MF	(England) Ben Krauhaus	5	0	0	0	0	0	0	0	0	0	0	0	5	0	0
10	1	GK	(England) Grant Smith	4	0	0	0	0	0	0	0	0	0	0	0	4	0	0
11	6	DF	(England) Kyle Cameron	3	0	0	0	0	0	0	0	0	0	0	0	3	0	0
11	14	FW	(England) Nicke Kabamba	3	0	0	0	0	0	0	0	0	0	0	0	3	0	0
11	18	FW	(England) Corey Whitely	3	0	0	0	0	0	0	0	0	0	0	0	3	0	0
14	3	DF	(England) Deji Elerewe	2	0	0	0	0	0	0	0	0	0	0	0	2	0	0
14	3	DF	(England) Zech Medley	2	0	0	0	0	0	0	0	0	0	0	0	2	0	0
14	15	DF	(England) Jesse Debrah	2	0	0	0	0	0	0	0	0	0	0	0	2	0	0
14	25	FW	(England) Damola Ajayi	2	0	0	0	0	0	0	0	0	0	0	0	2	0	0
18	2	DF	(England) Carl Jenkinson	1	0	0	0	0	0	0	0	0	0	0	0	1	0	0
18	8	MF	(England) Ben Thompson	1	0	0	0	0	0	0	0	0	0	0	0	1	0	0
18	9	FW	(England) Michael Cheek	1	0	0	0	0	0	0	0	0	0	0	0	1	0	0
18	22	DF	(England) Lakyle Samuel	1	0	0	0	0	0	0	0	0	0	0	0	1	0	0
18	34	MF	(England) Alex Stepien-Iwumene	0	0	0	0	0	0	0	0	0	1	0	0	1	0	0
18	36	MF	(England) George Penn	0	0	0	0	0	0	0	0	0	1	0	0	1	0	0
18	42	DF	(England) Freddie Taylor	0	0	0	0	0	0	0	0	0	1	0	0	1	0	0
Total				86	0	1	1	0	0	1	0	0	4	0	0	92	0	1
