= Jesse Debrah =

English association football player

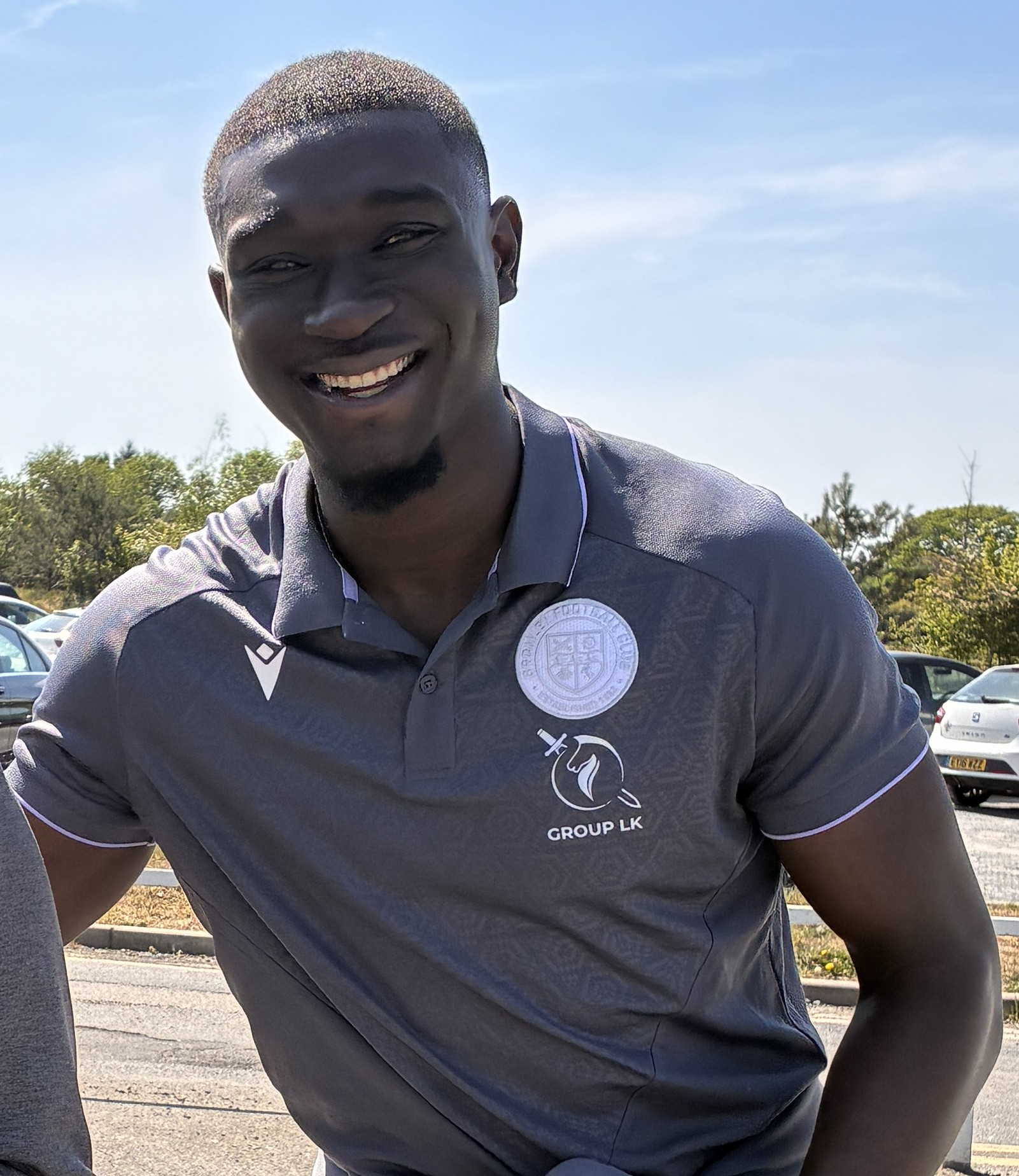
- Debrah in 2026

Personal information
- Full name: Jesse John Kodjo Debrah
- Date of birth: 1 May 2000 (age 26)
- Place of birth: Croydon, England
- Height: 1.87 m (6 ft 2 in)
- Position: Defender

Youth career
- 2010–2011: Charlton Athletic
- 2011–2019: Millwall

Senior career*
Years	Team	Apps	(Gls)
2019–2020	Millwall	0	(0)
2019	→ Billericay Town (loan)	2	(0)
2019	→ Eastbourne Borough (loan)	5	(0)
2020	→ Dulwich Hamlet (loan)	11	(0)
2020–2021	Dulwich Hamlet	10	(0)
2021–2023	FC Halifax Town	57	(3)
2023–2026	Port Vale	83	(2)
2026	→ Bromley (loan)	11	(0)

International career
2018	Barawa	1	(0)
2023	England C	1	(0)
- * Club domestic league appearances and goals as of 13:50, 31 March 2026 (UTC)

Jesse John Kodjo Debrah (born 1 May 2000) is an English footballer who plays as a defender.

Debrah joined Millwall at the age of ten, though he would leave the club without playing a first-team game following loan spells with Billericay Town, Eastbourne Borough and Dulwich Hamlet. He spent the first half of the 2020–21 season with Dulwich Hamlet before he joined FC Halifax Town in August 2021 and helped the club to win the FA Trophy in 2023. He signed with Port Vale in September 2023. He was promoted out of League Two with the club at the end of the 2024–25 season. He spent the second half of the 2025–26 season on loan at Bromley, helping the club to the League Two title.

== Early life ==
Jesse Debrah was born in Croydon on 1 May 2000. He grew up supporting Crystal Palace, though his parents, brother and two sisters all support different clubs.

== Club career ==
=== Early career ===
Debrah started his career with a one-season trial at Charlton Athletic before joining Millwall at the age of ten after he had scored two goals against the club playing as a right-back. He went on to captain the under-23 team. On 13 September 2019, he joined National League South side Billericay Town on a 28-day youth loan. He was named as captain of the under-23 team by coach Kevin Nugent. Manager Neil Harris named him on the first-team substitute bench on the last home game of the 2018–19 season, a 2–1 defeat to Bristol City at The Den on 30 April.

On 13 September 2019, Debrah joined Eastbourne Borough on a 28-day youth loan after manager Lee Bradbury found himself short of defensive options. On 1 January 2020, Debrah joined Dulwich Hamlet on an initial one-month loan, which was later extended until the end of the 2019–20 season. On 29 June 2020, Millwall announced that Debrah had not been offered a new contract by manager Gary Rowett and would therefore leave the club the following day upon the expiry of his contract.

On 23 August 2020, he rejoined Dulwich Hamlet permanently. He featured in 14 games in the first half of the 2020–21 campaign. Debrah had a trial at Motherwell and played a pre-season game against Celtic, though was not offered a contract by manager Graham Alexander. He then trained with Bromely due to his friendship with manager Andy Woodman.

=== FC Halifax Town ===
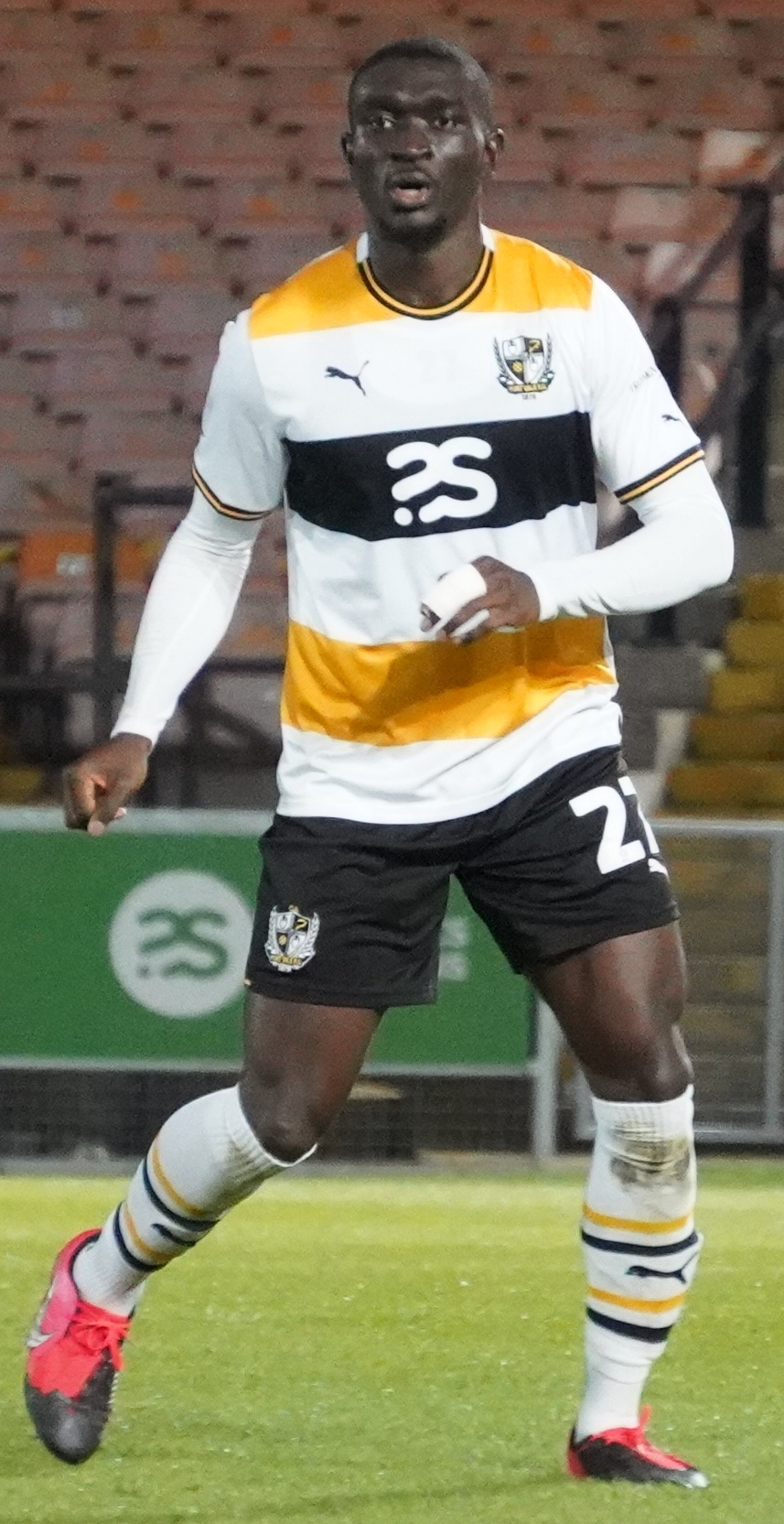
Debrah with Port Vale in 2023

On 19 August 2021, Debrah joined National League club FC Halifax Town on a short-term deal after impressing on trial. He scored on his club debut on 28 August, hitting the net from 25 yards (23 m) yards in a 3–2 win at Woking; after the game, he credited coach Chris Millington and manager Pete Wild for their faith in him, as well as his faith in God. However, he found himself mainly on the substitute bench as Tom Bradbury and Niall Maher maintained a strong centre-back partnership throughout most of the 2021–22 campaign. He managed to break into the first XI as Halifax reached the play-offs on the back of a strong defence. They were, however, beaten by Chesterfield in the play-off quarter-finals. He was linked with a move to Huddersfield Town in June 2022.

He established himself as a key member of the defence in the 2022–23 season, playing 33 league games, occasionally as captain. Halifax reached the 2023 FA Trophy final at Wembley Stadium, and won the competition with a 1–0 victory over Gateshead, with Debrah playing the first 62 minutes. After the season ended he suffered a grade three hamstring injury. He rejected Halifax's offer of a new contract and was linked with a move to Barnsley, but the deal broke down.

=== Port Vale ===
On 18 September 2023, Debrah signed a two-year contract with EFL League One club Port Vale, with a compensation fee to Halifax due to be set by a tribunal after the two clubs failed to reach an agreement. He had already spent some weeks rehabilitating his hamstring injury at the club. Manager Andy Crosby said that "he will offer excellent competition in the back line", whilst both Crosby and director of football David Flitcroft praised Debrah's "infectious personality" and "drive and determination". Debrah was sent off 38 minutes into his first league start following a second yellow card in a 3–0 defeat at Bristol Rovers on 3 October. He scored his first goal for the club seven days later in a 1–1 draw with Newcastle United U21 in an EFL Trophy group stage game at Vale Park. His form dipped as the club headed towards relegation at the end of the 2023–24 season.

In August 2024, Debrah said that manager Darren Moore had helped him work on his game over the summer to get him into a better physical and mental place. He started the 2024–25 campaign in good form, keeping experienced players Nathan Smith and Ben Heneghan out of the first XI. He scored his first EFL goal on 1 October in a 1–1 draw with Colchester United. He lost form in December, however, and was dropped from the team. He made his first league appearance in six weeks on 13 February, when he earned praise for his performance in a 1–0 win over promotion-rivals Notts County. The club opted to activate the optional extension in his contract after promotion was secured at the end of the 2024–25 season.

Speaking in October 2025, Moore described Debrah as a "fantastic project" for the club owing to his rise from non-League football to consistent selection in League One. On 30 January 2026, Debrah joined League Two leaders Bromley on loan until the end of the 2025–26 season. He had played 25 games for the Vale in the first half of the campaign, helping to keep nine clean sheets. He played regularly for Bromley until he sustained an injury in March. He played 11 games for Bromley, who won promotion as champions of League Two. He was released by Port Vale upon the expiry of his contract.

== International career ==
Debrah represented Barawa, a team representing the Somali diaspora in the United Kingdom, after being called up to the 2018 CONIFA World Football Cup. He is of Ghanaian descent. He went on to be capped for the England C team.

== Style of play ==
Debrah was a forward throughout his youth career before being converted to centre-back as he transitioned to senior football. He was described on the Millwall website as "commanding, physical and composed".

== Career statistics ==
As of match played 21 March 2026

Appearances and goals by club, season and competition
Club	Season	League			FA Cup		EFL Cup		Other		Total	
Club	Season	Division	Apps	Goals	Apps	Goals	Apps	Goals	Apps	Goals	Apps	Goals
Millwall	2018–19	Championship	0	0	0	0	0	0	—		0	0
Millwall	2019–20	Championship	0	0	0	0	0	0	—		0	0
Millwall	Total		0	0	0	0	0	0	0	0	0	0
Billericay Town (loan)	2018–19	National League South	2	0	0	0	—		1 (Note: Appearance(s) in the Essex Senior Cup)	0	3	0
Eastbourne Borough (loan)	2019–20	National League South	5	0	2	0	—		0	0	7	0
Dulwich Hamlet (loan)	2019–20	National League South	11	0	0	0	—		0	0	11	0
Dulwich Hamlet	2020–21	National League South	10	0	2	0	—		2 (Note: Appearance(s) in FA Trophy)	0	14	0
Dulwich Hamlet	Total		21	0	2	0	0	0	2	0	25	0
FC Halifax Town	2021–22	National League	24	1	2	0	—		2 (Note: 1 appearance in the FA Trophy and 1 appearance in the play-offs)	0	28	1
FC Halifax Town	2022–23	National League	33	2	1	0	—		5	0	39	2
FC Halifax Town	Total		57	3	3	0	0	0	7	0	67	3
Port Vale	2023–24	League One	31	0	3	0	3	0	3 (Note: Appearance(s) in EFL Trophy)	1	40	1
Port Vale	2024–25	League Two	35	2	1	0	1	0	4	0	41	2
Port Vale	2025–26	League One	17	0	1	0	3	0	4	1	25	1
Port Vale	Total		83	2	5	0	7	0	11	2	106	4
Bromley (loan)	2025–26	League Two	11	0	—		—		—		11	0
Career total			179	5	12	0	7	0	21	2	219	7

== Honours ==
FC Halifax Town

- FA Trophy: 2022–23

Port Vale

- EFL League Two second-place promotion: 2024–25

Bromley

- EFL League Two: 2025–26
