= Nicke Kabamba =

English footballer (born 1993)

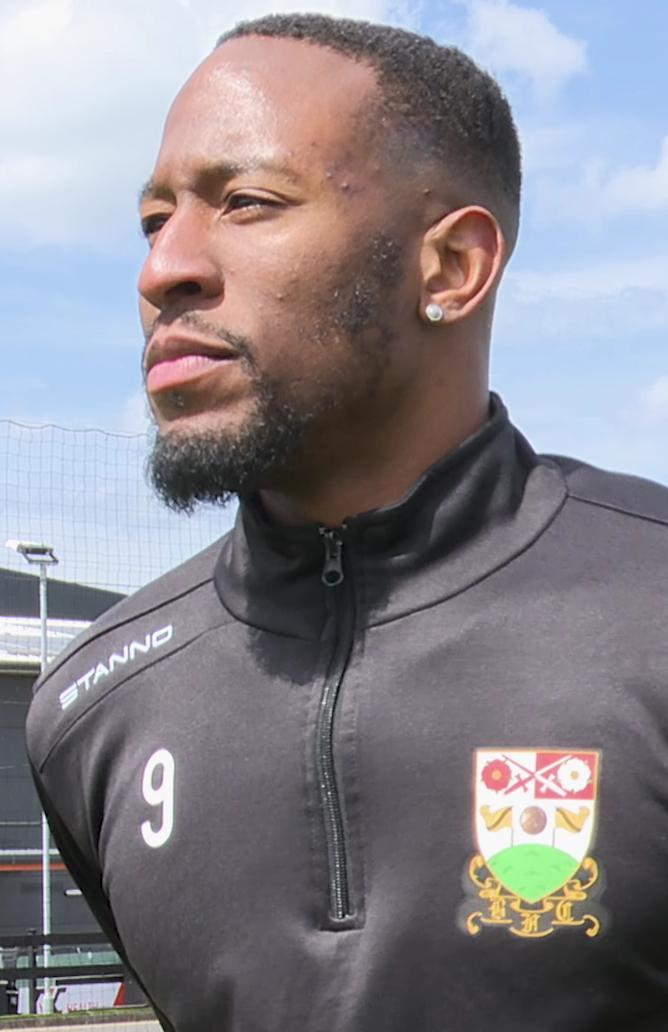
- Kabamba with Barnet in 2024

Personal information
- Full name: Nicke Kabamba
- Date of birth: 1 February 1993 (age 33)
- Place of birth: Brent, England
- Height: 6 ft 3 in (1.91 m)
- Position: Forward

Team information
- Current team: Bromley
- Number: 14

Youth career
- 2010–2011: Hayes & Yeading United

Senior career*
Years	Team	Apps	(Gls)
2011–2013	Uxbridge	59	(18)
2013	A.F.C. Hayes	5	(2)
2014–2015	Burnham	40	(18)
2015–2016	Hemel Hempstead Town	14	(2)
2015–2016	→ Hampton & Richmond Borough (loan)	23	(7)
2016–2017	Hampton & Richmond Borough	47	(26)
2017–2018	Portsmouth	5	(0)
2017	→ Colchester United (loan)	8	(0)
2018	→ Aldershot Town (loan)	10	(2)
2018–2019	Havant & Waterlooville	29	(5)
2019	→ Hartlepool United (loan)	17	(7)
2019–2020	Hartlepool United	25	(5)
2020–2021	Kilmarnock	42	(7)
2021–2022	Northampton Town	21	(2)
2022	→ Woking (loan)	21	(3)
2022–2025	Barnet	101	(54)
2025–	Bromley	65	(15)

International career^{‡}
2024	England C	1	(1)
- * Club domestic league appearances and goals as of 23:24, 2 May 2026 (UTC) ‡ National team caps and goals as of 19:14, 7 May 2024 (UTC)

Nicke Kabamba (born 1 February 1993) is an English footballer who plays as a striker for EFL League One club Bromley.

Born in Brent, London, Kabamba started his career in non-League football. He started his career with Hayes & Yeading before subsequently moving to Uxbridge, A.F.C. Hayes, Burnham, Hemel Hempstead Town and Hampton & Richmond Borough. His form at Hampton & Richmond earned him a move to League Two club Portsmouth. At Portsmouth, Kabamba made six appearances and had loan spells with Colchester United and Aldershot Town. He left Portsmouth in 2018, signing for Havant & Waterlooville of the National League. Later that season, Kabamba had a successful loan spell with Hartlepool United and signed permanently for them in 2019. In January 2020, he signed for Scottish side Kilmarnock. After two seasons in Scotland, he signed for League Two club Northampton Town. After a loan move to Woking, he signed for Barnet in 2022.

== Club career ==
=== Early career ===
Kabamba was a sprinter when young, but opted to play football instead. He joined Uxbridge in 2011 after scoring 13 goals for Hayes & Yeading United's under-18 team. He impressed enough with the reserve squad to grant a debut on 22 November in a Southern League Cup 3–1 defeat at Northwood.

Kabamba left Uxbridge in October 2013 and signed for A.F.C. Hayes. After a goalscoring debut against North Greenford United, he only scored one further goal for the club, in a 2–1 away loss against Potters Bar Town, before leaving in November. He subsequently moved to Burnham before the window break, and started to score in a regular basis.

On 30 September 2014 Kabamba scored five goals in a game including a hat-trick in the opening 10 minutes as Burnham beat Bideford 5–1 in the Southern League. On 5 December 2014, he was loaned to Hemel Hempstead Town until the end of the season.

=== Hampton & Richmond Borough ===
In August 2015, Kabamba signed for Hampton & Richmond Borough on loan, later making the move permanent in January 2016. He became the club's top scorer in the 2015–16 season with 18 goals, as it achieved promotion to National League South.

=== Portsmouth ===
On 18 January 2017, Kabamba signed an 18-month contract with League Two club Portsmouth with the option of a 12-month extension. He made his debut for the club on 18 March, replacing Noel Hunt in a 3–0 away defeat to Stevenage.

On 31 August 2017, Kabamba signed for Colchester United until January 2018, becoming the fifth player to enter Colchester on deadline day. He made his Colchester debut on 9 September in their 3–1 win against Crawley Town. After failing to score in ten appearances for Colchester, he returned to his parent club on 14 December.

On 5 January 2018, Kabamba joined National League side Aldershot Town on loan for the remainder of the campaign. On 9 May, Portsmouth announced that his contract, which would expire on 30 June, would not be renewed.

=== Havant and Waterlooville ===
On 14 June 2018, Kabamba signed for National League newcomers Havant and Waterlooville and has made 32 appearances and scored 6 goals across all competitions.

=== Hartlepool United ===
On 18 January 2019, in a return to full-time professional football, Kabamba signed on loan for fellow national league side Hartlepool United, scoring 5 goals in his first 4 starts. He finished his loan spell with 7 goals in 17 National League appearances, including a goal in a 3–2 win over Salford City F.C. on the final game of the season which ended their opponents' title run. Kabamba signed a permanent deal on 13 May 2019.

=== Kilmarnock ===
Kabamba signed for Scottish Premiership club Kilmarnock on a one-and-a-half-year contract on 17 January 2020. He scored on his debut, coming off the bench in a 6–0 win against Queen's Park in the Scottish Cup.

=== Northampton Town ===
On 2 June 2021, Kabamba joined Northampton Town of League Two on a two-year deal.

On 21 January 2022, Kabamba joined Woking on loan for the remainder of the campaign.

Kabamba had his contract terminated in June 2022.

=== Barnet ===
On 21 June 2022, the same day in which he had his Northampton Town contract terminated, Kabamba joined National League club Barnet.

=== Bromley ===
On 10 January 2025, Kabamba signed for League Two side Bromley for an undisclosed fee. He has since become a top scorer for the club with 13 goals so far in the 2025/26 campaign, second only to Michael Cheek.

== International career ==
On 22 September 2020, Kabamba was called-up by the DR Congo.

In April 2024, Kabamba was named in the England C squad for their upcoming friendly against Nepal, scoring the first goal in a 2–0 victory.

== Career statistics ==
As of match played 2 May 2026

Appearances and goals by club, season and competition
Club	Season	League			FA Cup		League Cup		Other		Total	
Club	Season	Division	Apps	Goals	Apps	Goals	Apps	Goals	Apps	Goals	Apps	Goals
Uxbridge	2011–12	SFL - Division One Central	13	4	0	0	—		5 (Note: One appearance in the Southern League Cup, one in the Middlesex Senior Cup; two appearances and a goal in the Middlesex Senior Charity Cup and one appearance in the SFL League One Central play-offs)	1	18	5
Uxbridge	2012–13	SFL - Division One Central	37	11	3	3	—		9 (Note: Three appearances and a goal in the FA Trophy, One appearance and a goal in the Southern League Cup, three appearances and three goals in the Middlesex Senior Charity Cup and two appearances and a goal in the Middlesex Senior Cup)	6	49	20
Uxbridge	2013–14	SFL - Division One Central	9	3	1	0	—		1 (Note: Appearance in the FA Trophy)	0	11	3
Uxbridge	Total		59	18	4	3	—		15	7	78	28
A.F.C. Hayes	2013–14	SFL - Division One Central	5	2	—		—		—		5	2
Burnham	2013–14	SFL - Premier Division	25	9	—		—		—		25	9
Burnham	2014–15	SFL - Premier Division	15	9	2	0	—		8	5	25	14
Burnham	Total		40	18	2	0	—		8	5	50	23
Hemel Hempstead Town	2014–15	Conference South	14	2	0	0	—		0	0	14	2
Hampton & Richmond Borough	2015–16	Isthmian Premier Division	45	18	1	0	—		2	1	48	19
Hampton & Richmond Borough	2016–17	National League South	25	15	2	3	—		5	3	32	21
Hampton & Richmond Borough	Total		70	33	3	3	—		7	4	80	40
Portsmouth	2016–17	League Two	4	0	0	0	0	0	0	0	4	0
Portsmouth	2017–18	League One	1	0	0	0	1	0	0	0	2	0
Portsmouth	Total		5	0	0	0	1	0	0	0	6	0
Colchester United (loan)	2017–18	League Two	8	0	0	0	0	0	2 (Note: Appearances in the EFL Trophy)	0	10	0
Aldershot Town (loan)	2017–18	National League	10	2	0	0	—		1	1	11	3
Havant & Waterlooville	2018–19	National League	29	5	1	0	—		2	1	32	6
Hartlepool United (loan)	2018–19	National League	17	7	0	0	—		0	0	17	7
Hartlepool United	2019–20	National League	25	5	5	2	—		1	0	31	7
Kilmarnock	2019–20	Scottish Premiership	9	2	3	2	0	0	0	0	12	4
Kilmarnock	2020–21	Scottish Premiership	33	5	1	0	1	0	—		35	5
Kilmarnock	Total		42	7	4	2	1	0	0	0	47	9
Northampton Town	2021–22	League Two	21	0	2	0	1	0	3	1	27	1
Woking (loan)	2021–22	National League	21	3	—		—		—		21	3
Barnet	2022–23	National League	42	19	4	0	—		6 (Note: Five appearances in FA Trophy, one in National League playoffs)	0	53	19
Barnet	2023–24	National League	41	25	5	4	—		5 (Note: Four appearances in FA Trophy, one in National League playoffs)	3	51	32
Barnet	2024–25	National League	18	10	2	1	—		2	1	22	12
Barnet	Total		101	54	11	5	0	0	13	4	126	63
Bromley	2024–25	League Two	19	2	0	0	0	0	0	0	19	2
Bromley	2025–26	League Two	46	13	0	0	2	0	3	0	51	13
Bromley	Total		65	15	0	0	2	0	3	0	70	15
Career total			532	171	32	15	5	0	55	23	626	209

== Honours ==
Barnet

- National League: 2024–25

Bromley

- EFL League Two: 2025–26
