= Marcus Ifill =

English footballer (born 2003)

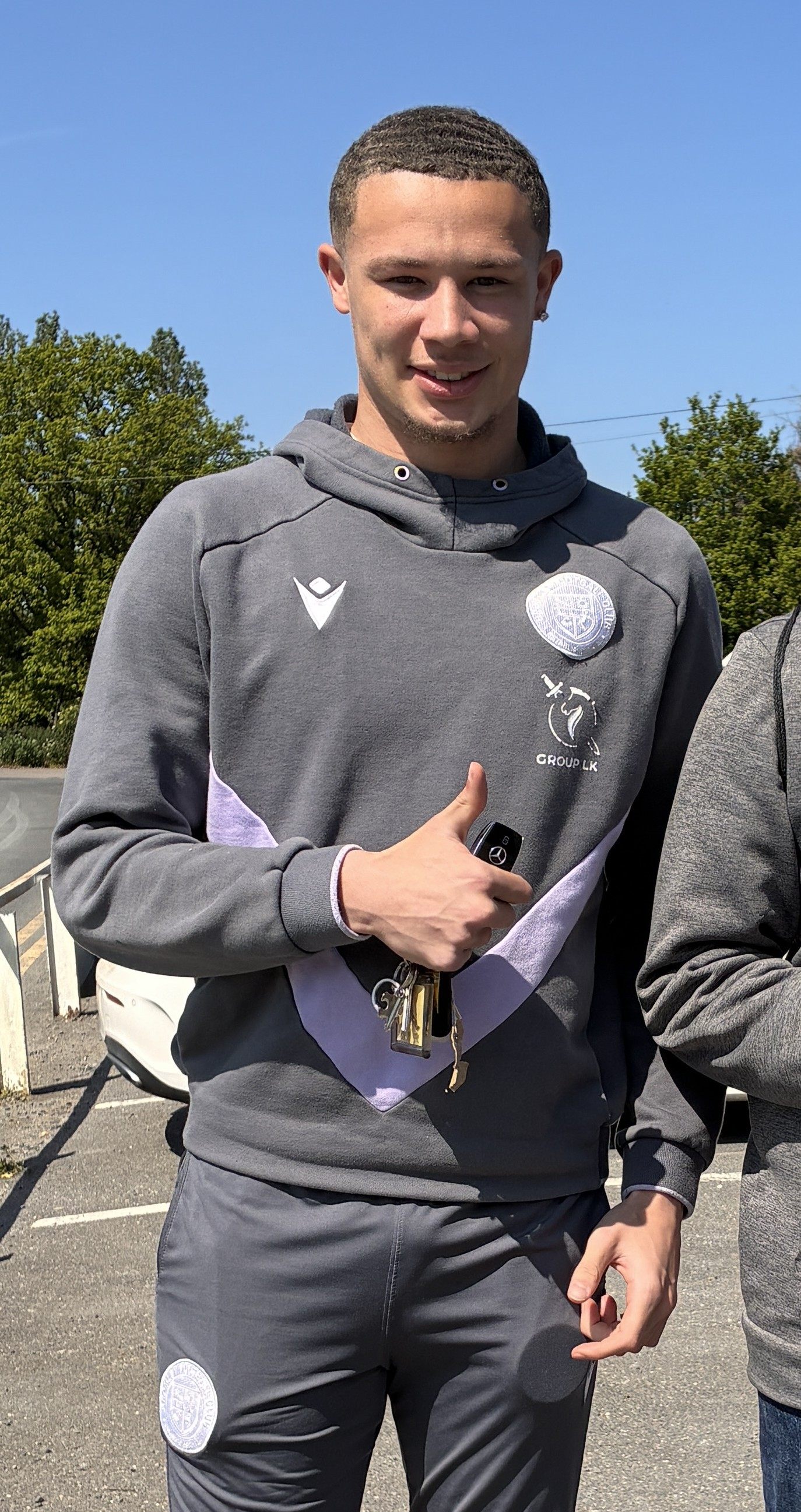
- Ifill in 2026

Personal information
- Full name: Marcus Lemar Ifill
- Date of birth: 2 November 2003 (age 23)
- Place of birth: Swindon, England
- Positions: Winger; right-back

Team information
- Current team: Bromley
- Number: 12

Youth career
- –2020: Swindon Town
- 2020–2025: Brighton & Hove Albion

Senior career*
Years	Team	Apps	(Gls)
2025–	Bromley	46	(3)
- * Club domestic league appearances and goals as of 14 June 2026

Marcus Lemar Ifill (born 2 November 2003) is an English professional footballer who plays as a winger for EFL League One club Bromley.

== Career ==
Having started his youth career with hometown club Swindon Town, Ifill joined the Brighton & Hove Albion Academy in January 2020. Shortly after joining, he was named by The Guardian as the best first-year scholar at the club. He signed a new three-year contract in August 2022.

=== Bromley ===
On 3 February 2025, Ifill signed for League Two club Bromley on a permanent deal. On 25 February, he made his senior league debut as a second-half substitute in a 1–0 home defeat to Bradford City. On 15 November 2025, he scored a first competitive goal for the club in a 2–1 victory over Barrow.

He made 40 league appearances during the 2025–26 season as the Ravens won promotion to League One for the first time in the club's history as League Two champions.

His contract with Bromley was renewed for the 2026–27 season, after the club exercised a contract option.

== Career statistics ==
As of end of 2025–26 season

Appearances and goals by club, season and competition
Club	Season	League			FA Cup		League Cup		Other		Total	
Club	Season	Division	Apps	Goals	Apps	Goals	Apps	Goals	Apps	Goals	Apps	Goals
Brighton & Hove Albion U21	2021–22	—			—		—		1 (Note: Appearance(s) in EFL Trophy)	0	1	0
Brighton & Hove Albion U21	2022–23	—			—		—		2	0	2	0
Brighton & Hove Albion U21	2023–24	—			—		—		2	0	2	0
Brighton & Hove Albion U21	2024–25	—			—		—		2	1	2	1
Brighton & Hove Albion U21	Total		0	0	0	0	0	0	7	1	7	1
Bromley	2024–25	League Two	6	0	0	0	0	0	0	0	6	0
Bromley	2025–26	League Two	40	3	0	0	2	0	1	0	43	3
Bromley	Total		46	3	0	0	2	0	1	0	49	3
Career total			46	3	0	0	2	0	8	1	56	4

== Honours ==
Bromley

- EFL League Two: 2025–26
