= Ben Krauhaus =

English footballer (born 2003)

Personal information
- Full name: Ben Carl Krauhaus
- Date of birth: 11 October 2003 (age 23)
- Place of birth: Bexley, England
- Height: 1.80 m (5 ft 11 in)
- Position: Attacking midfielder

Team information
- Current team: Falkirk (on loan from Brentford)
- Number: 28

Youth career
- Charlton Athletic
- –2021: Bromley

Senior career*
Years	Team	Apps	(Gls)
2021–2024	Bromley	39	(4)
2022	→ Walton & Hersham (loan)	10	(3)
2022	→ Cray Wanderers (loan)	15	(4)
2024–	Brentford	0	(0)
2024	→ Bromley (loan)	15	(2)
2025–2026	→ Bromley (loan)	34	(1)
2026–	→ Falkirk (loan)	10	(2)
- * Club domestic league appearances and goals as of 18:00, 8 November 2026 (UTC)

Ben Carl Krauhaus (born 11 October 2003) is an English professional footballer who plays as an attacking midfielder for Scottish Premiership club Falkirk, on loan from Premier League club Brentford.

Krauhaus is a product of the Charlton Athletic and Bromley academies and made his senior breakthrough with the latter club. He transferred to Brentford in 2024.

== Career ==
=== Bromley ===
A midfielder, Krauhaus began his youth career in the Charlton Athletic Academy. Following his release, he joined the Bromley academy. He progressed through the academy to made his first team debut in an FA Trophy match in December 2021. Krauhaus spent much of 2022 on loan lower down the non-League pyramid and signed his first professional contract during the 2022 off-season. He established himself as a regular member of the Bromley matchday squad during the second half of the 2022–23 National League season, with 11 appearances and one goal, predominantly as a substitute.

After signing a new one-year contract, Krauhaus established himself as a virtual ever-present starter during the 2023–24 season. He signed a new contract in November 2023 and was voted the club's December 2023 Player of the Month. Krauhaus transferred out of Bromley for a club-record undisclosed fee in January 2024, but he immediately returned to the club on loan until the end of the 2023–24 season. A metatarsal injury suffered during Bromley's National League play-off semi-final ruled Krauhaus out of the shoot-out victory over Solihull Moors in the final, which saw the club promoted to the EFL for the first time in its history, though he still received a promotion medal. In recognition of his performances during the 2023–24 season, Krauhaus received the club's Young Player of the Year award. Krauhaus ended his spell at Hayes Lane with 64 appearances and 9 goals, with 51 appearances and 8 of those goals coming during the 2023–24 season.

=== Brentford ===
On 22 January 2024, Krauhaus transferred to the B team at Premier League club Brentford and signed a 3 1/2-year contract, with the option of a further year, for an undisclosed fee. Following a loan away during the second half of the 2023–24 season and recovering from a metatarsal injury, he returned to match play on 10 August 2024. Krauhaus made 28 appearances and scored three goals during the 2024–25 season and was part of the Professional Development League-winning B team squad, though he did not play in the Final. On 16 July 2025, Krauhaus returned to Bromley on loan until the end of the 2025–26 season. He made 40 appearances and scored two goals during the club's League Two championship-winning season. On 13 July 2026, Krauhaus joined Scottish Premiership club Falkirk on loan until the end of the 2026–27 season.

== Career statistics ==
As of match played 19 September 2026

Appearances and goals by club, season and competition
Club	Season	League			National cup (Note: Includes FA Cup, Scottish Cup)		League cup (Note: Includes EFL Cup, Scottish League Cup)		Other		Total	
Club	Season	Division	Apps	Goals	Apps	Goals	Apps	Goals	Apps	Goals	Apps	Goals
Bromley	2021–22	National League	0	0	0	0	―		2 (Note: One appearance in FA Trophy, one appearance in Kent Senior Cup)	0	2	0
Bromley	2022–23	National League	11	1	0	0	―		0	0	11	1
Bromley	2023–24	National League	43	5	2	1	―		6 (Note: Appearances in FA Trophy)	2	51	8
Bromley	Total		54	6	2	1	―		8	2	64	9
Walton & Hersham (loan)	2021–22	Combined Counties League Premier Division South	10	3	0	0	―		4 (Note: Appearances in Combined Counties League Premier Challenge Cup)	0	14	3
Cray Wanderers (loan)	2022–23	Isthmian League Premier Division	15	4	1	0	―		2 (Note: Appearances in London Senior Cup)	0	18	4
Brentford	2023–24	Premier League	0	0	0	0	0	0	—		0	0
Bromley (loan)	2025–26	League Two	34	1	1	0	2	0	3 (Note: Appearances in EFL Trophy)	1	40	2
Falkirk (loan)	2026–27	Scottish Premiership	6	1	0	0	2	0	—		8	1
Career total			119	15	4	1	4	0	17	3	144	19

== Honours ==
Walton & Hersham

- Combined Counties League Premier Division South: 2021–22
- Combined Counties League Premier Challenge Cup: 2021–22

Bromley

- National League play-offs: 2024
- EFL League Two: 2025–26

Individual

- Bromley Player of the Month: November 2023, December 2023
- Bromley Young Player of the Year: 2023–24
