= Omar Sowunmi =

British association football player (born 1995)

Personal information
- Full name: Omar Kolawole Olufemi Sowunmi
- Date of birth: 7 November 1995 (age 31)
- Place of birth: Colchester, England
- Height: 1.98 m (6 ft 6 in)
- Positions: Centre-back; forward

Team information
- Current team: Bromley
- Number: 5

Youth career
- –2014: Ipswich Town

Senior career*
Years	Team	Apps	(Gls)
2014–2015	Ipswich Town	0	(0)
2014	→ Braintree Town (loan)	3	(0)
2015	→ Lowestoft Town (loan)	15	(1)
2015–2019	Yeovil Town	69	(3)
2019–2021	Colchester United	22	(0)
2021–2023	Bromley	67	(10)
2023–2024	Sutton United	35	(4)
2024–	Bromley	74	(12)
- * Club domestic league appearances and goals as of 15:40, 13 May 2026 (UTC)

Omar Kolawole Olufemi Sowunmi (born 7 November 1995) is an English footballer who plays as a defender for EFL League One club Bromley. Primarily a defender, Sowunmi has played as a striker in the past.

== Career ==
=== Ipswich Town ===
Born in Colchester, Essex, Sowunmi is a graduate of the Ipswich Town academy, after impressing for the club's U18 and U21 sides he was rewarded with a one-year professional contract upon the completion of his academy scholarship in May 2014. On 17 October 2014, Sowunmi joined Conference National side Braintree Town on a month's youth loan. Sowunmi made four appearances in all competitions during his month on loan with the Essex side before returning to Ipswich in November. He then joined Conference North side Lowestoft Town on loan in January 2015. Sowunmi's loan was eventually extended to the end of the 2014–15 season and he made a total of fifteen league appearances for Lowestoft, and appeared twice and scored in the final of the Suffolk Premier Cup.

=== Yeovil Town ===
With Lowestoft keen to sign Sowunmi permanently upon the expiry of his contract, the defender also had a trial with Exeter City, and was amongst a host of trialists to feature in an end of season trial match at Yeovil Town. Having impressed manager Paul Sturrock, on 24 June 2015, Sowunmi signed a one-year contract with League Two side Yeovil Town. Sowunmi made his debut for Yeovil as a substitute in Yeovil's 1–0 defeat against York City, on 18 August 2015. He scored his first goal for Yeovil against Morecambe on 5 September 2015.

He was offered a new contract by Yeovil at the end of the 2017–18 season. He was captain during the 2018–19 season.

=== Colchester United ===
On 1 July 2019, Sowunmi signed for his hometown club Colchester United for an undisclosed fee. He made his club debut on 20 August, coming on as a substitute for Luke Norris in Colchester's 2–2 League Two draw at Grimsby Town.

After 30 appearances for the club, Sowunmi was released at the end of his contract in May 2021.

=== Bromley ===
On 16 August 2021, Sowunmi signed for Bromley following a successful trial period with the club.

=== Sutton United ===
On 16 June 2023, Sowunmi agreed to join League Two club Sutton United on a free transfer.

=== Bromley ===
On 1 July 2024, Sowumni returned to newly promoted League Two side Bromley for an undisclosed fee.

Following promotion in their second campaign at the level, he was named in the League Two Team of the Season for the 2025–26 season.

His contract with Bromley was renewed for the 2026–27 season, after the club exercised a contract option.

== Personal life ==
Sowunmi was born in England to a Nigerian father and an English mother. He attended Philip Morant School.

== Career statistics ==
As of match played 8 August 2026

Appearances and goals by club, season and competition
Club	Season	League			FA Cup		League Cup		Other		Total	
Club	Season	Division	Apps	Goals	Apps	Goals	Apps	Goals	Apps	Goals	Apps	Goals
Ipswich Town	2014–15	Championship	0	0	0	0	0	0	0	0	0	0
Braintree Town (loan)	2014–15	Conference Premier	3	0	1	0	—		0	0	4	0
Lowestoft Town (loan)	2014–15	Conference North	15	1	0	0	—		2 (Note: Appearances in Suffolk Premier Cup)	1	17	2
Yeovil Town	2015–16	League Two	5	1	1	0	0	0	2 (Note: Appearance in Football League Trophy)	0	8	1
Yeovil Town	2016–17	League Two	11	0	0	0	1	0	2 (Note: Appearance(s) in EFL Trophy)	2	14	2
Yeovil Town	2017–18	League Two	36	2	4	0	1	0	5	0	46	2
Yeovil Town	2018–19	League Two	17	0	0	0	1	0	1	0	19	0
Yeovil Town	Total		69	3	5	0	3	0	10	2	87	5
Colchester United	2019–20	League Two	7	0	1	0	0	0	3	0	11	0
Colchester United	2020–21	League Two	15	0	1	0	0	0	3	0	19	0
Colchester United	Total		22	0	2	0	0	0	6	0	30	0
Bromley	2021–22	National League	29	2	2	0	—		3 (Note: Appearances in FA Trophy)	0	34	2
Bromley	2022–23	National League	38	8	1	0	—		3 (Note: One appearance in FA Trophy and two appearances in National League play-offs)	0	42	8
Bromley	Total		67	10	3	0	—		6	0	76	10
Sutton United	2023–24	League Two	35	4	2	0	3	0	3	0	43	4
Bromley	2024–25	League Two	34	5	3	1	1	0	2	0	40	6
Bromley	2025–26	League Two	40	7	1	0	2	0	2	0	45	7
Bromley	2026–27	League One	0	0	0	0	1	0	0	0	1	0
Bromley	Total		74	12	4	1	4	0	4	0	86	13
Career total			285	30	17	1	10	0	31	3	343	34

== Honours ==
Lowestoft Town

- Suffolk Premier Cup: 2014–15

Bromley

- EFL League Two: 2025–26
- FA Trophy: 2021–22

Individual

- EFL League Two Team of the Season: 2025–26
- PFA Team of the Year: 2025–26 League Two
