= Alex Stepien-Iwumene =

English footballer (born 2005)

Personal information
- Full name: Emeka Alex Stepien-Iwumene
- Date of birth: 16 April 2005 (age 21)
- Place of birth: Lambeth, England
- Height: 1.90 m (6 ft 3 in)
- Position: Midfielder

Team information
- Current team: Maidstone United (on loan from Bromley)

Youth career
- –2022: Sutton United
- 2022–2024: Southampton

Senior career*
Years	Team	Apps	(Gls)
2024–2025	Derby County	0	(0)
2024	→ Eastleigh (loan)	1	(0)
2025–	Bromley	2	(0)
2026	→ Chelmsford City (loan)	5	(0)
2026	→ Cray Wanderers (loan)	8	(0)
2026–	→ Maidstone United (loan)	3	(0)
- * Club domestic league appearances and goals as of 17:36, 26 August 2026 (UTC)

Emeka Alex Stepien-Iwumene (born 16 April 2005) is an English professional footballer who plays as a midfielder for Maidstone United on loan from EFL League One club Bromley.

== Career ==
Having started his career with Sutton United, Stepien-Iwumene joined the academy of Southampton in June 2022. He departed the club at the end of the 2023–24 season.

=== Derby County ===
In July 2024, Stepien-Iwumene joined Derby County's academy having spent time with the club on trial at the end of the previous season. On 21 November 2024, he joined National League club Eastleigh on a two-month loan deal. He departed the Rams at the end of the 2024–25 season.

=== Bromley ===
On 8 August 2025, Stepien-Iwumene joined League Two club Bromley following a successful trial period. Having featured for the club in all three of their EFL Trophy group stage fixtures, he made his league debut on 9 December in a 3–1 victory over Crawley Town.

On 10 January 2026, he joined National League South side Chelmsford City on loan for the remainder of the season. On 13 March 2026, Stepien-Iwumene was recalled from his loan by his parent club. The following day, he joined Isthmian League Premier Division club Cray Wanderers on loan for the remainder of the season.

On 15 August 2026, Stepien-Iwumene joined National League South side Maidstone United on loan until January 2027.

== Career statistics ==
As of end of 2025–26 season

Appearances and goals by club, season and competition
Club	Season	League			FA Cup		League Cup		Other		Total	
Club	Season	Division	Apps	Goals	Apps	Goals	Apps	Goals	Apps	Goals	Apps	Goals
Derby County	2024–25	Championship	0	0	0	0	0	0	—		0	0
Eastleigh (loan)	2024–25	National League	1	0	0	0	—		2 (Note: Appearance(s) in FA Trophy)	1	2	1
Bromley	2025–26	League Two	2	0	0	0	0	0	3 (Note: Appearance(s) in EFL Trophy)	0	5	0
Chelmsford City (loan)	2025–26	National League South	6	0	—		—		0	0	6	0
Cray Wanderers (loan)	2025–26	Isthmian League Premier Division	8	0	—		—		0	0	8	0
Career total			17	0	0	0	0	0	5	1	22	1
