= Bromley F.C. =

Association football club in London, England

Bromley
- Full name: Bromley Football Club
- Nicknames: The Ravens; The Lillywhites
- Founded: 1892
- Ground: Hayes Lane
- Chairman: Robin Stanton-Gleaves
- Manager: Karl Robinson
- League: EFL League One
- 2025–26: EFL League Two, 1st of 24 (promoted)
- Website: bromleyfc.co.uk
Home colours	Away colours	Third colours

Bromley Football Club is a professional association football club based in Bromley, Greater London, England. The club competes in EFL League One, the third tier of English football, following promotion from EFL League Two in 2025–26. Bromley play their home matches at Hayes Lane.

Formed in 1892, they were founder members of the Southern League in 1894, before becoming founder members of the London League in 1896. After winning the Division Two title, they spent one season in the Kent League. In 1907, they became founder members of the Spartan League and won the division title before joining the Isthmian League. They won the Isthmian League in 1908–09 and 1909–10 as well as the FA Amateur Cup in 1910–11. Bromley joined the Athenian League in 1919, which they won in 1922–23, 1948–49 and 1950–51. In this period, they also won the FA Amateur Cup in 1937–38 and 1948–49.

Bromley joined the Isthmian League again in 1952–53. After several promotions and relegations between Division One and Two of the Isthmian League in the second half of the 20th century, they joined the Conference South in 2007–08. They won the Conference South title in 2014–15 to earn promotion to the fifth tier. After two unsuccessful play-off attempts, as well as winning the FA Trophy in 2021–22 in this period, they won the National League play-offs in 2023–24 to reach the English Football League for the first time in their history. The 2025–26 season saw them win the League Two title, earning promotion to League One.

== History ==
Bromley league performances

Established in 1892, Bromley initially played in the South London League, before becoming a founder member of the Southern League in 1894, joining Division Two. However, after finishing bottom of Division Two in 1895–96 they left to become founder members of the London League, also joining Division Two. They won the division at the first attempt and were promoted to Division One. They switched to the Kent League for the 1898–99 season, but after finishing bottom of the league, they returned to Division One of the London League. During the 1899–1900 season the club withdrew from Division One, taking over their reserves' fixtures in Division Two. They withdrew from Division Two at the end of the 1900–01 season.

In 1907 the club were founder members of the Spartan League and went on to become its inaugural champions. They joined the Isthmian League for the following season, and won back-to-back titles in 1908–09 and 1909–10. In 1910–11 the club won the FA Amateur Cup, beating Bishop Auckland 1–0 in the final. However, the club then left the Isthmian League and returned to the Kent League, being placed in Division One. They remained in the league until World War I, but joined the Athenian League when football resumed in 1919. The club were Athenian League champions in 1922–23. In 1937–38 they reached the first round of the FA Cup for the first time. After beating King's Lynn in the first round, they lost 4–1 at Scarborough in the second. They also reached the final of the FA Amateur Cup again, beating Erith & Belvedere 1–0. The club repeated the feat the following season, this time playing Football League opposition for the first time as they lost 8–1 at Lincoln City in the second round. In 1945–46 another second round appearance resulted in a 4–2 aggregate defeat to Watford. In 1947–48 they held Reading to a 1–1 draw in the first round, before losing the replay at Elm Park 3–0.

The club won another Athenian League title and the FA Amateur Cup in 1948–49, with the following season seeing another FA first round defeat, this time 2–1 to Watford. In 1950–51 the club won their third Athenian League title; the season also saw them lose 1–0 to Aldershot in the FA Cup first round. Going straight into the first round the following season, they lost 3–2 at Torquay United. In 1952 they rejoined the Isthmian League, and after finishing as runners-up in their first season back in the league, they were champions in 1953–54. They won the league for a fourth time in 1960–61.

After finishing bottom of Division One in the 1974–75 season Bromley were relegated to Division Two. In 1976–77 the club appeared in the FA Cup first round for the first time in over twenty years, losing 7–0 at Swindon Town. Division Two became Division One in 1977, and the club were promoted to the Premier Division after finishing as runners-up in 1979–80. They were relegated to Division One again in 1983–84, but returned to the Premier Division as Division One runners-up in 1985–86. Another relegation followed in 1989–90, but was followed by an immediate return to the Premier Division as Division One runners-up in 1990–91. In 1996–97 they qualified for the FA Cup first round again, but were beaten 3–1 at home by Enfield.

Bromley were relegated to Division One of the Isthmian League again at the end of the 1998–99 season; non-league reorganisation in 2004 saw Division One become the eighth rather than seventh tier of the football pyramid. A fourth-place finish that season saw them qualify for the promotion play-offs, and after defeating Metropolitan Police on penalties in the semi-finals, they beat Horsham 3–1 in the final to earn promotion to the Isthmian Premier Division. In 2006–07 they finished as runners-up in the Premier Division, again qualifying for the promotion play-offs. A 1–0 win over AFC Wimbledon in the semi-finals and a victory against Billericay Town on penalties in the final saw them promoted to the Conference South. The season had also seen them reach the FA Cup first round again, eventually losing 4–1 at Gillingham. Further appearances in the first round were achieved in 2009–10 (against Colchester United), 2011–12 (Leyton Orient), 2012–13 (Fleetwood Town) and 2014–15 (Dartford), but they were beaten on each occasion.

In 2014–15 Bromley won the Conference South, earning promotion to the renamed National League. Another FA Cup first round appearance in 2017–18 saw them defeated by Rochdale. The season also saw them reach the final of the FA Trophy, where they lost 5–4 on penalties to Brackley Town after the match had ended in a 1–1 draw. In 2020–21 the club finished seventh in the National League, qualifying for the promotion play-offs, in which they lost 3–2 to Hartlepool United in the quarter-finals. The club won the FA Trophy for the first time in their history in 2021–22, beating Wrexham 1–0 in the final. In the 2022–23 season they finished seventh in the National League again. In the play-offs the club defeated Woking 2–1 in the quarter-finals, before losing 3–2 to Chesterfield in the semi-finals. In the 2023–24 season, Bromley achieved promotion to League Two after defeating Solihull Moors 4–3 on penalties (after the game ended 2–2 after extra time) in the promotion play-off final, entering the Football League for the first time in the club's history.

On 10 August 2024 Bromley beat Harrogate Town 2–0 to win their first EFL League Two match, with Michael Cheek scoring the club's first League goal. They then played south London rivals AFC Wimbledon at Hayes Lane twice in four days, losing their EFL Cup first round tie 2–1, then winning their first home league game 2–0. The 2025–26 season saw them win the League Two title after beating Wallsall 3–1, earning promotion to EFL League One for the first time in the club's history.

== Ground ==
The club initially played at the Queensmead Recreation Ground, before moving to Glebe Road. Seven years later they moved to the Plaistow Cricket Club ground when Glebe Road was bought for use as housing. However, the cricket club's ground was also obtained for housing in 1904, leading to the football club (and the other sports club using the ground) moving to a site on Hayes Lane. The new ground was opened on 3 September 1904.

In 1938 the club moved to the current Hayes Lane ground. The record attendance of 10,798 was set during a game against a Nigeria XI in September 1948. The ground consists of four stands; the John Fiorini Stand, the North Terrace, the Glyn Beverly stand and the East Terrace, which was completed in late 2025.

== Current squad ==
As of 23 September 2026

Note: Flags indicate national team as defined under FIFA eligibility rules; some limited exceptions apply. Players may hold more than one non-FIFA nationality.

No.	Pos.	Nation	Player
1	GK	ENG	Grant Smith
2	DF	ENG	Chanse Headman
3	DF	ENG	Richard Taylor (on loan from Bolton Wanderers)
4	MF	GRN	Ashley Charles
5	DF	ENG	Omar Sowunmi (captain)
6	MF	NIR	George Saville
7	FW	ENG	Ethon Archer (on loan from Luton Town)
8	MF	ENG	Ben Thompson
9	FW	ENG	Michael Cheek
10	FW	MLT	Jodi Jones
11	MF	ENG	Mitch Pinnock
12	DF	ENG	Marcus Ifill
14	FW	ENG	Nicke Kabamba
15	DF	KEN	Deon Woodman
16	MF	CGO	Will Hondermarck
17	DF	GAM	Jacob Mendy
18	FW	ENG	Corey Whitely

No.	Pos.	Nation	Player
19	MF	ENG	Mickel Miller
20	FW	NGR	Victor Adeboyejo
21	DF	ENG	Kamarl Grant (on loan from Millwall)
22	MF	SLE	Kamil Conteh
27	MF	ENG	Tobias Brenan
28	MF	NIR	JJ McKiernan
30	GK	DMA	Shamal George
31	GK	IRL	Owen Mason
32	DF	ENG	Freddie Taylor
33	MF	ENG	Nathan Paul-Lavaly
34	DF	ENG	Freddie Cowin
35	DF	ENG	Nathan Patten
38	FW	POL	Dawid Przybylo
40	GK	ENG	Rex Porter
45	DF	ENG	Adam Jackson
50	DF	ENG	Jonathan Haftom
51	GK	ENG	Charlie Burton

=== Out on loan ===
Note: Flags indicate national team as defined under FIFA eligibility rules; some limited exceptions apply. Players may hold more than one non-FIFA nationality.

No.	Pos.	Nation	Player
23	GK	ENG	Dillon Addai (at Walton & Hersham until 1 October 2026)
24	FW	ENG	Soul Kader (at Cray Wanderers until 2 January 2027)
25	MF	ENG	Josh Tobin (at Farnham Town until 5 December 2026)
26	MF	ENG	Alex Stepien-Iwumene (at Maidstone United until 2 January 2027)

No.	Pos.	Nation	Player
29	FW	WAL	George Evans (at Braintree Town)
36	MF	ENG	Jedd Hobbs (at AFC Whyteleafe until 2 January 2027)
37	MF	ENG	Hayden Bullas (at Tonbridge Angels until 31 May 2027)

== Coaching and Football staff ==
As of 4 July 2025

Role	Name
Manager	(England) Karl Robinson
Assistant Manager	(England) Steve Aris
First-team coaches	(England) Alex Dyer (England) Byron Webster
Goalkeeping coach	(England) Brannon Daly
Head of Football Operations & Administration	(England) Matt Hall
B-Team & U21 Head Coach	(England) Ross McNeilly
Head of Medical	(Turkey) Erol Umut
Head of Sports Science	(England) Tom Cocking
Kit Manager	(Turkey) Hus Torgut

== Honours ==
- English Football League
  - League Two champions 2025–26
- FA Trophy
  - Winners 2021–22
- FA Amateur Cup
  - Winners 1910–11, 1937–38, 1948–49
- National League
  - Play-off winners 2024
  - Conference South champions 2014–15
- Isthmian League
  - Champions 1908–09, 1909–10, 1953–54, 1960–61
- Athenian League
  - Champions 1922–23, 1948–49, 1950–51
- Spartan League
  - Champions 1907–08
- London League
  - Division Two champions 1896–97
- London Senior Cup
  - Winners 1909–10, 1945–46, 1950–51, 2002–03, 2012–13
- Kent Senior Cup
  - Winners 1949–50, 1976–77, 1991–92, 1996–97, 2005–06, 2006–07
- London Challenge Cup
  - Winners 1995–96
- Kent Floodlit Trophy
  - Winners 1978–79
- Kent Amateur Cup
  - Winners 1907–08, 1931–32, 1935–36, 1936–37, 1938–39, 1946–47, 1948–49, 1950–51, 1952–53, 1953–54, 1954–55, 1959–60

== Records ==
- Best FA Cup performance: Third round, 2024–25
- Best EFL Cup performance: Second round, 2025–26
- Best EFL Trophy performance: Group stage, 2024–25, 2025–26
- Best FA Trophy performance: Winners, 2021–22
- Record attendance: 10,789 vs Nigeria XI, 24 September 1948
- Biggest victory: 13–1 vs Redhill, Athenian League, 1945–46
- Heaviest defeat: 11–1 vs Barking, Athenian League, 1933–34
- Most appearances: George Brown (1938–1961)
- Most goals: George Brown, 570 (1938–1961)
- Record transfer fee received: Undisclosed sum from Brentford for Ben Krauhaus, January 2024

== In popular culture ==
Lifelong fan Dave Roberts wrote three books on his experiences following Bromley FC: The Bromley Boys (2008), 32 Programmes (2011) and Home and Away (2016). The first book was made into a 2018 film, The Bromley Boys, available on DVD and via streaming, starring Martine McCutcheon, Alan Davies and Jamie Foreman.

== See also ==
- Bromley F.C. players
- Bromley F.C. managers
