= 2025–26 EFL League Two =

22nd season of EFL League Two

EFL League Two
- Season: 2025–26
- Dates: 2 August 2025 – 25 May 2026
- Champions: Bromley; 1st League Two title 1st fourth tier title
- Promoted: Bromley; Milton Keynes Dons; Cambridge United; Notts County
- Relegated: Harrogate Town; Barrow
- Matches: 552
- Goals: 1,404 (2.54 per match)
- Top goalscorer: (Republic of Ireland) Aaron Drinan (22 goals)
- Biggest home win: Grimsby Town 7–1 Cheltenham Town (27 September 2025)
- Biggest away win: Bristol Rovers 0–4 Milton Keynes Dons (11 October 2025); Harrogate Town 0–4 Milton Keynes Dons (20 December 2025); Gillingham 1–5 Milton Keynes Dons (10 March 2026); Accrington Stanley 0–4 Notts County (17 March 2026); Shrewsbury Town 0–4 Crewe Alexandra (21 March 2026); Walsall 0–4 Cheltenham Town (11 April 2026)
- Highest scoring: Grimsby Town 7–1 Cheltenham Town (27 September 2025); Colchester United 6–2 Chesterfield (4 October 2025); Barnet 6–2 Gillingham (25 April 2026)
- Longest winning run: Bristol Rovers (8 games)
- Longest unbeaten run: Bromley (21 games)
- Longest winless run: Harrogate Town (20 games)
- Longest losing run: Bristol Rovers (10 games)
- Highest attendance: 23,465; Milton Keynes Dons 4–1 Harrogate Town (7 March 2026)
- Lowest attendance: 1,424; Crawley Town 2–2 Swindon Town (7 March 2026)
- Total attendance: 2,299,046
- All statistics correct as of 2 May 2026.

The 2025–26 EFL League Two (referred to as Sky Bet League Two due to sponsorship reasons) was the 22nd season of the EFL League Two under its current title, and the 34th season under its current league division format. The season began on 2 August 2025, and ended on 25 May 2026.

== Team changes ==
The following teams have changed division since the 2024–25 season:

=== To League Two ===
Promoted from the National League

- Barnet
- Oldham Athletic

Relegated from League One

- Crawley Town
- Bristol Rovers
- Cambridge United
- Shrewsbury Town

=== From League Two ===
Promoted to League One

- Doncaster Rovers
- Port Vale
- Bradford City
- AFC Wimbledon

Relegated to the National League

- Carlisle United
- Morecambe

== Stadiums and locations ==
Note: Table lists in alphabetical order.

Team	Location	Stadium	Capacity
Accrington Stanley	Accrington	Crown Ground	5,450
Barnet	London (Canons Park)	The Hive Stadium	6,500
Barrow	Barrow-in-Furness	Holker Street	6,500
Bristol Rovers	Bristol (Horfield)	Memorial Stadium	12,500
Bromley	London (Bromley)	Hayes Lane	6,100
Cambridge United	Cambridge	Abbey Stadium	8,127
Cheltenham Town	Cheltenham	Whaddon Road	7,066
Chesterfield	Chesterfield	SMH Group Stadium	10,504
Colchester United	Colchester	Colchester Community Stadium	10,105
Crawley Town	Crawley	Broadfield Stadium	5,996
Crewe Alexandra	Crewe	Gresty Road	10,153
Fleetwood Town	Fleetwood	Highbury Stadium	5,327
Gillingham	Gillingham	Priestfield Stadium	11,582
Grimsby Town	Cleethorpes	Blundell Park	9,052
Harrogate Town	Harrogate	Wetherby Road	5,000
Milton Keynes Dons	Milton Keynes (Denbigh)	Stadium MK	30,500
Newport County	Newport	Rodney Parade	7,850
Notts County	Nottingham	Meadow Lane	19,841
Oldham Athletic	Oldham	Boundary Park	13,513
Salford City	Salford	Moor Lane	5,108
Shrewsbury Town	Shrewsbury	New Meadow	9,875
Swindon Town	Swindon	County Ground	15,728
Tranmere Rovers	Birkenhead (Prenton)	Prenton Park	16,789
Walsall	Walsall (Bescot)	Bescot Stadium	11,300

Locations of the 2025–26 EFL League Two teams

== Personnel and sponsoring ==
Team	Manager	Captain	Kit manufacturer	Shirt sponsor (front)	Shirt sponsor (back)	Shirt sponsor (sleeve)	Shorts sponsor
Accrington Stanley	(England) John Doolan	(England) Farrend Rawson	(Italy) Macron	Wham Housewares	Telana	None	Fagan & Whalley
Barnet	(Republic of Ireland) Dean Brennan	(England) Anthony Hartigan	(Netherlands) Stanno	TIC Health	TBA	TBA	TBA
Barrow	(Republic of Ireland) Sam Foley (interim)	(Republic of Ireland) Niall Canavan	(Germany) Puma	Newfoundland and Labrador	Cumbria Roofing Ulverston	Keyin College	DSG Limited
Bristol Rovers	(Scotland) Steve Evans	(England) Alfie Kilgour	(Italy) Macron	FanHub	Poplar Insulation	Hotchkins Group	None
Bromley	(England) Andy Woodman	(England) Byron Webster	(Italy) Macron	LSP Renewables	Blue Security Systems	Brownhill Insurance Group	CJC consulting
Cambridge United	(England) Neil Harris	(England) Michael Morrison	(England) Umbro	Brooks	The Hill Group	Fora	Alan Boswell Group
Cheltenham Town	(England) Steve Cotterill	(Wales) James Wilson	(Italy) Erreà	Mira Showers	Marchants	Smarta Water-Smarta Energy	CGT Lettings
Chesterfield	(England) Paul Cook	(Jamaica) Chey Dunkley	(Germany) Puma	Leengate Valves	None	Leengate Valves	Ideal Flooring
Colchester United	(England) Danny Cowley	(Northern Ireland) Tom Flanagan	(Italy) Macron	HotLizard	Coffey Brooks Financial Services	Peach Guitars	Bidfood
Crawley Town	(Turkey) Colin Kazim-Richards	(England) Dion Conroy	(Italy) Erreà	Rentokil Initial	Eden Utilities	Brick Borrow	Beaufort Homes
Crewe Alexandra	(England) Lee Bell	(England) Mickey Demetriou	(Germany) Puma	Whitby Morrison (H & A) / St. Luke's Hospice (T)	Zzoomm	Enviro Skip Hire	CAN Solutions
Fleetwood Town	(England) Matt Lawlor	(Guyana) Elliot Bonds	(Germany) Puma	Ruby Energy (H & A) / BES Utilities (T)	onCORE Foodservice Solutions	Lancashire Bird Control	None
Gillingham	(England) Gareth Ainsworth	(England) Armani Little	(Italy) Macron	MEMS	C&A Building Products	Magnus Search Recruitment	Howden
Grimsby Town	(Gibraltar) David Artell	(England) Kieran Green	(England) Umbro	myenergi	Winner Winner Chicken Dinner	Blackrow Group	3Q Industrial Supplies
Harrogate Town	(England) Simon Weaver	(England) Warren Burrell	(United States) New Balance	EnviroVent	Oak By Design	Annapurna Recruitment	None
Milton Keynes Dons	(England) Paul Warne	(England) Alex Gilbey	(United States) Reebok	Suzuki	Equity Energies	Stadium Support Services Ltd	Stadium Support Services Ltd
Newport County	(Austria) Christian Fuchs	(Wales) Matt Baker	(England) VX3 Sportswear	Pure Vans (H) / Alfa Staff (A)	57 Tyres Newport (H)	Best Blinds 431117 (H) / Newport Galvanizers (A)	Candour Talent (H) / Bar Piazza Newport (A)
Notts County	(Northern Ireland) Martin Paterson	(England) Matthew Palmer	(Germany) Puma	John Pye Auctions (H) / University of Nottingham (A)	John Pye Auctions (H) / Swan Homes (A)	WorkBox UK	None
Oldham Athletic	(Scotland) Micky Mellon	(England) Tom Conlon	(Germany) Puma	RRG Group	TBC	TBC	TBC
Salford City	(England) Karl Robinson	(England) Luke Garbutt	(Germany) Adidas	Fireball Cinnamon Whisky	Quality Care Group	Salford Van & Car Hire	Champions Travel
Shrewsbury Town	(England) Gavin Cowan	(England) John Marquis	(England) Oxen	Shropshire Homes	R1 Construction	Jim Dorricott Construction	Hanmart Windows & Doors
Swindon Town	(England) Ian Holloway	(England) Ollie Clarke	(Germany) Adidas	MiPermit	FirstCity Care Group (H) / Cellular Fitness (A)	Veezu (H) / Barnes Coaches(A)	Platinum Security Services (H) / Cotswold Farm Machinery (A)
Tranmere Rovers	(England) Pete Wild (interim)	(England) Sam Finley	(Indonesia) Mills	Essar	Searchability	O'Rourke Construction	None
Walsall	(Jamaica) Darren Byfield (interim)	(Jamaica) Jamille Matt	(Italy) Macron	NoFo Brew Co	RayGray Snacks	Howard Evans Roofing and Cladding	RayGray Snacks

== Managerial changes ==
Team	Outgoing manager	Manner of departure	Date of vacancy	Position in the table	Incoming manager	Date of appointment
Newport County	(Wales) Dafydd Williams	End of interim spell	3 May 2025	Pre-season	(Wales) David Hughes	23 May 2025
Bristol Rovers	(Spain) Iñigo Calderón	Sacked	4 May 2025	Pre-season	(England) Darrell Clarke	6 May 2025
Notts County	(England) Stuart Maynard	Sacked	22 May 2025	Pre-season	(Northern Ireland) Martin Paterson	22 June 2025
Cheltenham Town	(Wales) Michael Flynn	Sacked	20 September 2025	24th	(England) Steve Cotterill	30 September 2025
Newport County	(Wales) David Hughes	Sacked	15 November 2025	24th	(Austria) Christian Fuchs	20 November 2025
Barrow	(England) Andy Whing	Sacked	10 December 2025	18th	(Scotland) Paul Gallagher	2 January 2026
Bristol Rovers	(England) Darrell Clarke	Sacked	13 December 2025	23rd	(Scotland) Steve Evans	16 December 2025
Fleetwood Town	(England) Pete Wild	Sacked	25 January 2026	15th	(England) Matt Lawlor (Note: Lawlor was initially appointed interim head coach on 26 January 2026, before being appointed head coach permanently on 17 March 2026.)	26 January 2026
Shrewsbury Town	(England) Michael Appleton	Mutual consent	28 January 2026	21st	(England) Gavin Cowan	29 January 2026
Barrow	(Scotland) Paul Gallagher	Sacked	11 February 2026	22nd	(Tunisia) Dino Maamria	11 February 2026
Tranmere Rovers	(England) Andy Crosby	Sacked	4 March 2026	19th	(England) Pete Wild	10 March 2026
Walsall	(England) Mat Sadler	Sacked	11 March 2026	11th	(Jamaica) Darren Byfield (interim)	11 March 2026
Barrow	(Tunisia) Dino Maamria	Sacked	11 March 2026	22nd	(Republic of Ireland) Sam Foley (interim)	11 March 2026
Crawley Town	(England) Scott Lindsey	Sacked	22 March 2026	21st	(Turkey) Colin Kazim-Richards	24 March 2026

== League table ==
Pos	Team	Pld	W	D	L	GF	GA	GD	Pts	Promotion, qualification or relegation
1	Bromley (C, P)	46	24	15	7	71	46	+25	87	Promotion to EFL League One
2	Milton Keynes Dons (P)	46	24	14	8	86	45	+41	86	Promotion to EFL League One
3	Cambridge United (P)	46	22	16	8	66	33	+33	82	Promotion to EFL League One
4	Salford City	46	25	6	15	61	51	+10	81	Qualification for League Two play-offs
5	Notts County (O, P)	46	24	8	14	74	52	+22	80	Qualification for League Two play-offs
6	Chesterfield	46	21	16	9	71	56	+15	79	Qualification for League Two play-offs
7	Grimsby Town	46	22	12	12	74	50	+24	78	Qualification for League Two play-offs
8	Barnet	46	21	13	12	70	53	+17	76	
9	Swindon Town	46	22	9	15	70	59	+11	75	
10	Oldham Athletic	46	18	14	14	60	44	+16	68	
11	Crewe Alexandra	46	19	10	17	64	58	+6	67	
12	Colchester United	46	18	12	16	62	49	+13	66	
13	Walsall	46	18	11	17	56	56	0	65	
14	Bristol Rovers	46	19	5	22	56	65	−9	62	
15	Fleetwood Town	46	15	16	15	57	58	−1	61	
16	Accrington Stanley	46	14	11	21	47	58	−11	53	
17	Gillingham	46	13	14	19	53	72	−19	53	
18	Cheltenham Town	46	14	10	22	53	79	−26	52	
19	Shrewsbury Town	46	13	10	23	42	69	−27	49	
20	Newport County	46	12	7	27	48	77	−29	43	
21	Tranmere Rovers	46	10	11	25	54	79	−25	41	
22	Crawley Town	46	8	16	22	44	68	−24	40	
23	Harrogate Town (R)	46	10	9	27	39	68	−29	39	Relegation to National League
24	Barrow (R)	46	9	9	28	45	78	−33	36	Relegation to National League

Source: EFL Official Website
Rules for classification: 1) Points; 2) Goal difference; 3) Number of goals scored; 4) Head-to-head results; 5) Wins; 6) Away goals; 7) Penalty points (sec 9.5); 8) 12-point sending off offences
(C) Champions; (O) Play-off winners; (P) Promoted; (R) Relegated

== Results ==
Home \ Away	ACC	BNT	BRW	BRV	BRM	CAM	CHT	CHF	COL	CRA	CRE	FLE	GIL	GRI	HAR	MKD	NPC	NTC	OLD	SAL	SHR	SWI	TRA	WAL
Accrington Stanley	—	0–1	2–1	3–1	0–1	1–1	3–1	0–1	1–0	3–3	2–0	1–2	1–1	1–1	1–0	0–2	0–1	0–4	1–0	1–0	0–2	4–0	1–1	1–3
Barnet	2–0	—	3–2	4–0	2–2	1–0	0–0	1–0	1–1	2–1	1–1	0–2	6–2	3–0	1–1	2–2	1–2	0–1	3–2	1–3	1–3	1–2	1–0	1–2
Barrow	0–0	2–2	—	0–2	2–1	0–2	1–2	0–1	1–0	0–1	1–0	0–1	0–1	2–2	0–1	0–2	1–2	2–1	3–2	1–2	0–0	1–3	0–3	1–3
Bristol Rovers	2–0	0–2	2–1	—	2–3	1–0	4–0	2–3	0–1	3–1	2–1	1–0	0–1	3–1	0–1	0–4	3–0	0–1	0–0	2–1	1–0	0–3	1–4	2–0
Bromley	2–1	2–0	2–1	1–0	—	0–0	1–1	2–2	1–0	3–1	2–2	2–2	2–2	2–0	2–0	2–1	2–1	1–1	0–0	2–0	2–1	2–1	3–3	3–1
Cambridge United	2–0	0–0	3–0	3–1	2–1	—	1–0	1–1	1–1	3–1	2–1	2–1	5–0	1–2	1–1	1–1	2–0	4–0	0–1	1–0	1–0	1–1	4–2	2–0
Cheltenham Town	1–0	0–1	2–2	1–0	1–2	1–1	—	0–2	1–4	3–0	1–1	2–0	2–1	0–2	1–1	2–3	1–0	1–2	0–3	3–2	3–1	0–2	1–3	1–0
Chesterfield	3–3	3–1	1–0	3–1	0–0	0–1	1–0	—	3–0	2–2	2–0	1–1	1–0	2–1	1–1	1–1	4–1	2–0	0–3	2–0	2–3	1–2	1–1	2–2
Colchester United	2–1	4–1	0–2	1–1	0–2	1–2	2–0	6–2	—	0–0	1–1	2–1	0–0	0–1	3–1	1–0	4–1	0–1	1–3	0–1	2–0	3–0	1–1	1–1
Crawley Town	1–1	1–1	1–2	4–0	1–3	0–3	2–0	1–1	1–1	—	0–1	2–1	2–0	0–2	2–0	1–1	1–2	1–2	2–2	0–0	0–0	2–2	0–2	1–1
Crewe Alexandra	2–0	1–2	3–1	1–1	0–1	0–0	4–1	3–3	1–0	1–0	—	0–1	1–0	3–2	1–1	1–3	2–2	2–1	2–1	1–0	3–1	0–3	2–1	0–3
Fleetwood Town	2–1	2–5	3–2	2–1	1–2	1–2	2–2	1–1	4–2	1–0	1–4	—	2–1	0–1	3–2	1–1	0–0	1–2	1–1	1–1	3–1	1–1	0–0	1–1
Gillingham	2–0	1–1	2–2	1–2	1–4	1–1	1–1	4–1	1–1	2–2	1–0	1–1	—	1–4	0–1	1–5	3–2	1–0	0–3	1–2	1–0	0–2	2–1	1–0
Grimsby Town	1–0	1–0	5–0	0–1	1–1	1–1	7–1	0–1	1–2	3–0	3–2	1–0	1–0	—	1–3	2–2	2–1	0–2	0–0	3–1	1–0	4–0	1–2	2–2
Harrogate Town	0–2	1–2	1–0	2–3	0–0	2–1	1–1	1–2	1–0	0–1	1–2	1–2	0–3	3–3	—	0–4	0–3	0–2	0–1	0–1	2–0	0–1	0–2	0–2
Milton Keynes Dons	1–2	1–3	0–0	1–0	2–1	1–1	5–0	2–2	1–0	0–0	3–1	2–1	3–2	2–3	4–1	—	1–0	1–1	0–0	2–0	5–1	1–0	3–0	0–1
Newport County	1–4	0–0	2–2	2–3	0–1	0–2	0–2	2–1	1–2	0–2	2–0	0–2	1–3	0–0	2–1	1–2	—	1–1	3–2	0–1	1–0	0–1	3–1	2–4
Notts County	0–1	1–2	2–1	1–1	2–2	2–0	5–2	2–3	1–3	4–0	1–0	1–0	1–0	0–1	1–1	3–2	3–1	—	3–1	1–2	4–1	2–1	5–0	0–0
Oldham Athletic	3–0	1–1	0–0	2–0	1–0	0–3	2–1	1–1	1–1	2–0	0–0	1–1	0–1	1–0	1–0	1–1	3–0	3–0	—	1–2	2–2	1–2	3–1	0–1
Salford City	2–1	2–0	3–1	1–0	2–0	0–0	1–1	0–1	4–3	4–3	1–3	0–0	0–0	0–2	1–0	1–0	1–3	2–1	1–0	—	1–2	3–2	3–1	1–0
Shrewsbury Town	0–0	0–0	2–1	0–3	0–0	2–0	0–2	0–1	0–2	1–0	0–4	2–2	3–3	1–1	1–0	1–2	1–0	1–0	1–0	1–3	—	3–1	1–0	1–2
Swindon Town	2–2	0–2	3–1	1–1	2–0	3–2	0–1	1–2	0–0	1–0	1–2	1–1	2–0	2–2	3–1	1–2	2–0	2–2	3–0	2–3	2–1	—	2–1	2–1
Tranmere Rovers	0–1	0–2	1–3	1–2	0–2	0–0	3–2	1–1	0–1	2–0	1–4	1–0	1–1	1–1	0–3	2–2	1–1	1–2	1–3	0–2	4–0	0–1	—	1–3
Walsall	0–0	1–3	1–2	2–1	3–1	0–0	0–4	1–0	0–2	0–0	1–0	0–1	2–2	0–1	0–2	0–2	2–1	1–2	1–2	1–0	1–1	2–1	4–2	—

Source: BBC Sport
Legend: Blue = home team win; Yellow = draw; Red = away team win.
For upcoming matches, an "a" indicates there is an article about the rivalry between the two participants.

== Play-offs ==
=== Bracket ===
Semi-finals
4	Salford City (a.e.t.)	2	2	4
7	Grimsby Town	1	2	3
5	Notts County	1	0	1
6	Chesterfield	0	0	0

Final
4	Salford City	0
5	Notts County	3

=== Semi-finals ===
First leg

10 May 2026
15:00 BST

Grimsby Town	1–2	Salford City
Staunton 1'	Report	Cesay 4'; Oluwo 40'

Blundell Park, Cleethorpes
Attendance: 8,115
Referee: Matthew Corlett
10 May 2026
18:00 BST

Chesterfield	0–1	Notts County
	Report	Luker 28'

SMH Group Stadium, Chesterfield
Attendance: 10,014
Referee: Will Finnie

Second leg

15 May 2026
19:15 BST

Salford City	2–2 (a.e.t.)	Grimsby Town
Udoh 53'; Cesay 117'	Report	Green 74'; Kabia 78'

The Peninsula Stadium, Salford
Attendance: 4,500
Referee: Ben Speedie

Salford City won 4–3 on aggregate.

15 May 2026
20:00 BST

Notts County	0–0	Chesterfield
	Report

Meadow Lane, Nottingham
Attendance: 17,224
Referee: Thomas Parsons

Notts County won 1–0 on aggregate.

=== Final ===
25 May 2026
15:00 BST

Salford City	0–3	Notts County
	Report	Jatta 32'; Ness 45'; Jones 70'

Wembley Stadium, London
Attendance: 30,851
Referee: Tom Reeves

== Season statistics ==
As of 2 May 2026

=== Top goalscorers ===
Rank	Player	Club	Goals
1	(Republic of Ireland) Aaron Drinan	Swindon Town	22
2	(Republic of Ireland) Jaze Kabia	Grimsby Town	18
3	(Scotland) Callum Paterson	Milton Keynes Dons	16
3	(England) Isaac Hutchinson	Bristol Rovers; Cheltenham Town	16
3	(England) Kabongo Tshimanga	Crawley Town; Barnet	16
3	(England) Michael Cheek	Bromley	16
7	(The Gambia) Alassana Jatta	Notts County	15
7	(Sierra Leone) Daniel Kanu	Walsall	15
9	(England) Matthew Dennis	Notts County	14

=== Hat-tricks ===
Player	For	Against	Result	Date
(England) Jack Payne	Colchester United	Chesterfield	6–2 (H)	4 October 2025
(Republic of Ireland) Paddy Madden	Accrington Stanley	Swindon Town	4–0 (H)	18 October 2025
(England) Harry Anderson	Colchester United	Harrogate Town	3–1 (H)	18 October 2025
(England) Emre Tezgel	Crewe Alexandra	Grimsby Town	3–2 (H)	25 October 2025
(Scotland) Michael Mellon	Oldham Athletic	Tranmere Rovers	3–1 (H)	20 December 2025
(England) Michael Cheek	Bromley	Crawley Town	3–1 (A)	29 December 2025
(Switzerland) Fabrizio Cavegn	Bristol Rovers	Shrewsbury Town	3–0 (A)	1 January 2026
(Scotland) Callum Paterson	Milton Keynes Dons	Shrewsbury Town	5–1 (H)	24 January 2026
(England) Ben Thompson	Bromley	Gillingham	4–1 (A)	31 January 2026
(England) Jack Payne	Colchester United	Barnet	4–1 (H)	21 February 2026
(Republic of Ireland) Jaze Kabia	Grimsby Town	Swindon Town	4–0 (H)	25 April 2026
(Wales) Ellis Harrison	Bristol Rovers	Cheltenham Town	4–0 (H)	25 April 2026
(England) Callum Stead^{5}	Barnet	Gillingham	6–2 (H)	25 April 2026

=== Clean sheets ===
Rank	Player	Club	Clean sheets
1	(England) Mathew Hudson	Oldham Athletic	19
2	(England) Jake Eastwood	Cambridge United	18
3	(Scotland) Craig MacGillivray	Milton Keynes Dons	15
3	(England) Grant Smith	Bromley	15
3	(Scotland) Cieran Slicker	Barnet	15
3	(England) Matty Young	Salford City	15
7	(England) Jackson Smith	Grimsby Town	13
7	(England) Connor Ripley	Swindon Town	13
9	(England) Ollie Wright	Accrington Stanley	12

== Awards ==
=== Monthly ===
Each month the EFL announces their official Player of the Month and Manager of the Month.

Month	Manager of the Month		Player of the Month		Reference
August	(England) Gareth Ainsworth	Gillingham	(England) Matthew Dennis	Notts County	
September	(England) Mat Sadler	Walsall	(Republic of Ireland) Aaron Drinan	Swindon Town	
October	(England) Steve Cotterill	Cheltenham Town	(England) Harry Anderson	Colchester United	
November	(England) Danny Cowley	Colchester United	(England) Ryan Finnigan	Walsall	
December	(England) Andy Woodman	Bromley	(Northern Ireland) Lee Bonis	Chesterfield	
January	(England) Neil Harris	Cambridge United	(England) Ben Knight	Cambridge United	
February	(England) Gavin Cowan	Shrewsbury Town	(England) Jack Payne	Colchester United	
March	(Scotland) Micky Mellon	Oldham Athletic	(England) Mark Helm	Fleetwood Town	
April	(Scotland) Steve Evans	Bristol Rovers	(England) Callum Stead	Barnet	

=== Annual ===
Award	Winner	Club
Player of the Season	(Republic of Ireland) Aaron Drinan	Swindon Town
Young Player of the Season	(Sierra Leone) Daniel Kanu	Walsall
Apprentice of the Season	(Wales) Ollie Dewsbury	Bristol Rovers

=== League Two Team of the Season ===
Pos.	Player	Club
GK	(England) Mathew Hudson	Oldham Athletic
CB	(England) Jack Sanders	Milton Keynes Dons
CB	(England) Omar Sowunmi	Bromley
CB	(England) Kelland Watts	Cambridge United
RWB	(England) Harvey Rodgers	Grimsby Town
CM	(England) Isaac Hutchinson	Cheltenham Town
CM	(Republic of Ireland) Liam Kelly	Milton Keynes Dons
CM	(England) Sammy Braybrooke	Chesterfield
LWB	(England) Mitch Pinnock	Bromley
ST	(Republic of Ireland) Aaron Drinan	Swindon Town
ST	(Scotland) Callum Paterson	Milton Keynes Dons
Manager	(England) Andy Woodman	Bromley

== See also ==
- 2025–26 Premier League
- 2025–26 EFL Championship
- 2025–26 EFL League One
- 2025–26 National League
- 2025–26 EFL Cup
- 2025–26 FA Cup
- 2025–26 EFL Trophy
