= 2025–26 in English football =

Football in England
- Season: 2025–26

Men's football
- Premier League: Arsenal
- Championship: Coventry City
- League One: Lincoln City
- League Two: Bromley
- National League: York City
- FA Cup: Manchester City
- EFL Trophy: Luton Town
- EFL Cup: Manchester City
- Community Shield: Crystal Palace

Women's football
- Women's Super League: Manchester City
- Women's Championship: Birmingham City
- FA Women's National League Northern Premier Division: Burnley
- FA Women's National League Southern Premier Division: Watford
- Women's FA Cup: Manchester City
- Women's League Cup: Chelsea

The 2025–26 season was the 146th competitive association football season in England.

== National teams ==
=== England men's national football team ===
==== Results and fixtures ====
===== Friendlies =====
9 October 2025	England	3–0	Wales	London, England
19:45 BST (UTC+1)	Rogers 3'; Watkins 11'; Saka 20'			Stadium: Wembley Stadium; Attendance: 78,126; Referee: Urs Schnyder (Switzerland)

27 March 2026	England	1–1	Uruguay	London, England
19:45 GMT (UTC±0)	White 81'		Valverde 90+4' (pen.)	Stadium: Wembley Stadium; Attendance: 80,581; Referee: Sven Jablonski (Germany)

31 March 2026	England	0–1	Japan	London, England
19:45 BST (UTC+1)			Mitoma 23'	Stadium: Wembley Stadium; Attendance: 79,233; Referee: Nick Walsh (referee) (Scotland)

7 June 2026	England	1–0	New Zealand	Tampa, United States
18:00 UTC−7	Kane 45+2'			Stadium: Raymond James Stadium; Attendance: 25,889; Referee: Natalie Simon (United States)

10 June 2026	England	3–0	Costa Rica	Orlando, United States
21:00 UTC-7	Rice 9'; Gordon 68' (pen.); Watkins 87'			Stadium: Inter&Co Stadium; Attendance: 25,557; Referee: Katja Koroleva (United States)

==== 2026 FIFA World Cup qualification ====
===== Group K =====
Pos	Team	Pld	W	D	L	GF	GA	GD	Pts	Qualification	(England national football team)	(Albania national football team)	(Serbia national football team)	(Latvia national football team)	(Andorra national football team)
1	England	8	8	0	0	22	0	+22	24	Qualification for 2026 FIFA World Cup	—	2–0	2–0	3–0	2–0
2	Albania	8	4	2	2	7	5	+2	14	Advance to play-offs	0–2	—	0–0	1–0	3–0
3	Serbia	8	4	1	3	9	10	−1	13		0–5	0–1	—	2–1	3–0
4	Latvia	8	1	2	5	5	15	−10	5		0–5	1–1	0–1	—	2–2
5	Andorra	8	0	1	7	3	16	−13	1		0–1	0–1	1–3	0–1	—

Source: FIFA, UEFA

6 September 2025	England	2–0	Andorra	Villa Park, Birmingham
18:00 (17:00 UTC+1)	García 25' (o.g.); Rice 67'; Burn (yellow card) 90'	Report (FIFA); Report (UEFA)	Babot (yellow card) 6'	Attendance: 39,202; Referee: Mohammad Al-Emara (Finland)

9 September 2025	Serbia	0–5	England	Red Star Stadium, Belgrade
20:45	Lukić (yellow card) 29'; Milenković (red card) 72'	Report (FIFA); Report (UEFA)	Kane 33'; Madueke 35'; Gordon (yellow card) 40'; Konsa 52'; Guéhi 75'; Rashford 90' (pen.)	Attendance: 39,789; Referee: Clément Turpin (France)

14 October 2025	Latvia	0–5	England	Daugava Stadium, Riga
21:45 EET (UTC+2)	Cignakis (yellow card) 31'; Balodis (yellow card) 41'; Černomordijs (yellow card) 45+4'; Regža (yellow card) 87'	Report	Gordon 26'; Kane 44', 45+4' (pen.); Toņiševs 58' (o.g.); Eze 86'; Konsa (yellow card) 87'	Attendance: 10,404; Referee: Tasos Sidiropoulos (Greece)

13 November 2025	England	2–0	Serbia	Wembley Stadium, London
19:45 GMT (UTC+0)	Saka 28'; Eze 90'	Report	Kostic (yellow card) 85'	Attendance: 74,289; Referee: Ivan Kružliak (Slovakia)

16 November 2025	Albania	0–2	England	Arena Kombëtare, Tirana
20:00 CET (UTC+1)	Ramadani (yellow card) 15'	Report	Wharton (yellow card) 39'; Kane 74', 82'; Bellingham (yellow card) 80'	Attendance: 21,459; Referee: Marco Guida (Italy)

==== 2026 FIFA World Cup ====
===== 2026 FIFA World Cup Group L =====
Pos	Team	Pld	W	D	L	GF	GA	GD	Pts	Qualification
1	England	3	2	1	0	6	2	+4	7	Advance to knockout stage
2	Croatia	3	2	0	1	5	5	0	6	Advance to knockout stage
3	Ghana	3	1	1	1	2	2	0	4	Advance to knockout stage
4	Panama	3	0	0	3	0	4	−4	0	

Source: FIFA
Rules for classification: Group stage tiebreakers

17 June 2026	England	4–2	Croatia	Arlington, United States
15:00 CDT (UTC-5)	Kane 12' (pen.), 42'; Bellingham 47'; Rashford 85'	Report	Baturina 36'; Musa 45+5'	Stadium: AT&T Stadium; Attendance: 70,389; Referee: Clément Turpin (France)

23 June 2026	England	0–0	Ghana	Foxborough, United States
16:00 EDT (UTC-4)		Report		Stadium: Gillette Stadium; Attendance: 63,983; Referee: Saíd Martínez (Honduras)

27 June 2026	Panama	0–2	England	East Rutherford, United States
17:00 EDT (UTC-4)		Report	Bellingham 62'; Kane 67'	Stadium: MetLife Stadium; Attendance: 80,663; Referee: Abdulrahman Al-Jassim (Qatar)

===== 2026 FIFA World Cup knockout stage =====
1 July 2026 R32	England	2–1	DR Congo	Atlanta, United States
12:00 p.m. UTC−4	Kane 75' 86'	Report	Cipenga 7'	Stadium: Mercedes-Benz Stadium; Attendance: 68,239; Referee: Adham Makhadmeh (Jordan)

5 July 2026 R16	Mexico	2–3	England	Mexico City, Mexico
19:00 CST (UTC-6)	Quiñones 42'; Jiménez 69' (pen.)	Report	Bellingham 36' 38'; Kane 60' (pen.)	Stadium: Estadio Azteca; Attendance: 80,824; Referee: Alireza Faghani (Australia)

11 July 2026 QF	Norway	1–2 (a.e.t.)	England	Miami Gardens, United States
17:00 EDT (UTC-4)	Schjelderup 36'	Report	Bellingham 45+2' 93'	Stadium: Hard Rock Stadium; Attendance: 64,478; Referee: Clément Turpin (France)

15 July 2026 SF	England	1–2	Argentina	Atlanta, United States
15:00 EDT (UTC-4)	Gordon 55'	Report	Fernández 85'; Martínez 90+2'	Stadium: Mercedes-Benz Stadium; Attendance: 68,239; Referee: Ismail Elfath (United States)

18 July 2026 3rd	France	4–6	England	Miami Gardens, United States
17:00 EDT (UTC-4)	Mbappé 48', 66'; Barcola 54'; Dembele 90+6'	Report	Rice 3'; Konsa 18'; Saka 37', 45+1', 87' (.pen); Bellingham 90+8'	Stadium: Hard Rock Stadium; Attendance: 64,478; Referee: Jesús Valenzuela (Venezuela)

=== England women's national football team ===
==== Results and fixtures ====
===== Friendlies =====
25 October 2025 Friendly	England	1–2	Brazil	Manchester, England
17:30 BST		Report		Stadium: City of Manchester Stadium

28 October 2025 Friendly	England	3–0	Australia	Derby, England
19:00 GMT		Report		Stadium: Pride Park Stadium

29 November 2025 Friendly	England	8–0	China	London, England
17:30 GMT	Mead 12', 14'; Hemp 16'; Stanway 23', 38' (pen.), 52'; Toone 71'; Russo 78'	Report		Stadium: Wembley Stadium; Referee: Ionela Peşu (Romania)

2 December 2025 Friendly	England	2–0	Ghana	Southampton, England
19:00 GMT	Kendall 6'; Russo 90+5' (pen.)	Report		Stadium: St Mary's Stadium; Attendance: 20,252; Referee: Lina Lehtovaara (Finland)

===== UEFA Women's Euro 2025 =====
====== UEFA Women's Euro 2025 Group D ======
Pos	Team	Pld	W	D	L	GF	GA	GD	Pts	Qualification
1	France	3	3	0	0	11	4	+7	9	Advance to knockout stage
2	England	3	2	0	1	11	3	+8	6	Advance to knockout stage
3	Netherlands	3	1	0	2	5	9	−4	3	
4	Wales	3	0	0	3	2	13	−11	0	

Source: UEFA
Rules for classification: Group stage tiebreakers

5 July 2025	France	2–1	England	Zürich, Switzerland
21:00 CEST (UTC+1)				Stadium: Letzigrund Stadion

9 July 2025	England	4–0	Netherlands	St. Gallen, Switzerland
18:00 CEST (UTC+1)				Stadium: Kybunpark

13 July 2025	England	6–1	Wales	St. Gallen, Switzerland
21:00 CEST (UTC+1)				Stadium: Kybunpark

====== Knockout Stage ======
13 July 2025 QF	Sweden	2–2 (a.e.t.) (2–3 p)	England	Zürich, Switzerland
21:00 CEST (UTC+1)	Asllani 2' Blackstenius 25'	Report	Bronze 79' Agyemang 81'	Stadium: Letzigrund Stadion; Attendance: 22,397; Referee: Marta Huerta de Aza (Spain)
	Penalties
	Angeldahl (penalty missed); Zigiotti Olme (penalty scored); Eriksson (penalty missed); Björn (penalty scored); Falk (penalty missed); Jakobsson (penalty missed); Holmberg (penalty missed)		(penalty scored) Russo; (penalty missed) James; (penalty missed) Mead; (penalty missed) Greenwood; (penalty scored) Kelly; (penalty missed) Clinton; (penalty scored) Bronze

22 July 2025 SF	England	2–1 (a.e.t.)	Italy	Geneva
21:00	Agyemang 90+6'; Kelly 119'	Report	Bonansea 33'	Stadium: Stade de Genève; Attendance: 26,539; Referee: Ivana Martinčić (Croatia)

27 July 2025
18:00

England	1–1 (a.e.t.)	Spain
Russo 57'	Report	Caldentey 25'
Penalties
Mead (penalty missed); Greenwood (penalty scored); Charles (penalty scored); Williamson (penalty missed); Kelly (penalty scored)	3–1	(penalty scored) Guijarro; (penalty missed) Caldentey; (penalty missed) Bonmatí; (penalty missed) Paralluelo

St. Jakob-Park, Basel
Attendance: 34,203
Referee: Stéphanie Frappart (France)

===== 2027 FIFA Women's World Cup qualification =====
====== 2027 FIFA Women's World Cup qualification – UEFA League A Group A3 ======
Pos	Team	Pld	W	D	L	GF	GA	GD	Pts	Qualification or relegation
1	Spain	6	5	0	1	21	3	+18	15	Qualification to 2027 FIFA Women's World Cup
2	England	6	5	0	1	13	5	+8	15	Advance to play-offs
3	Iceland	6	2	0	4	3	12	−9	6	Advance to play-offs
4	Ukraine (R)	6	0	0	6	2	19	−17	0	Advance to play-offs and relegation to League B

Source: UEFA
Rules for classification: Tiebreakers
(R) Relegated

== UEFA competitions ==
=== UEFA Super Cup ===
13 August 2025
21:00 UTC+2

Paris Saint-Germain (French Football Federation)	2–2	(The Football Association) Tottenham Hotspur
Lee Kang-in 85'; Ramos 90+4'	Report	Van de Ven 39'; Romero 48'
Penalties
Vitinha (penalty missed); Ramos (penalty scored); Dembélé (penalty scored); Lee Kang-in (penalty scored); Mendes (penalty scored)	4–3	(penalty scored) Solanke; (penalty scored) Bentancur; (penalty missed) Van de Ven; (penalty missed) Tel; (penalty scored) Porro

Stadio Friuli, Udine
Attendance: 21,025
Referee: João Pinheiro (Portugal)

=== UEFA Champions League ===
==== League phase ====
===== Arsenal =====
Pos	Team	Pld	W	D	L	GF	GA	GD	Pts	Qualification
1	(The Football Association) Arsenal	8	8	0	0	23	4	+19	24	Advance to round of 16 (seeded)
2	(German Football Association) Bayern Munich	8	7	0	1	22	8	+14	21	Advance to round of 16 (seeded)
3	(The Football Association) Liverpool	8	6	0	2	20	8	+12	18	Advance to round of 16 (seeded)
4	(The Football Association) Tottenham Hotspur	8	5	2	1	17	7	+10	17	Advance to round of 16 (seeded)
5	(Royal Spanish Football Federation) Barcelona	8	5	1	2	22	14	+8	16	Advance to round of 16 (seeded)

Source: UEFA
Rules for classification: League phase tiebreakers

Home team	Score	Away team
Athletic Bilbao (Spain)	0–2	(England) Arsenal
Arsenal (England)	2–0	(Greece) Olympiacos
Arsenal (England)	4–0	(Spain) Atlético Madrid
Slavia Prague (Czech Republic)	0–3	(England) Arsenal
Arsenal (England)	3–1	(Germany) Bayern Munich
Club Brugge (Belgium)	0–3	(England) Arsenal
Inter Milan (Italy)	1–3	(England) Arsenal
Arsenal (England)	3–2	(Kazakhstan) Kairat

===== Chelsea =====
Pos	Team	Pld	W	D	L	GF	GA	GD	Pts	Qualification
4	(The Football Association) Tottenham Hotspur	8	5	2	1	17	7	+10	17	Advance to round of 16 (seeded)
5	(Royal Spanish Football Federation) Barcelona	8	5	1	2	22	14	+8	16	Advance to round of 16 (seeded)
6	(The Football Association) Chelsea	8	5	1	2	17	10	+7	16	Advance to round of 16 (seeded)
7	(Portuguese Football Federation) Sporting CP	8	5	1	2	17	11	+6	16	Advance to round of 16 (seeded)
8	(The Football Association) Manchester City	8	5	1	2	15	9	+6	16	Advance to round of 16 (seeded)

Source: UEFA
Rules for classification: League phase tiebreakers

Home team	Score	Away team
Bayern Munich (Germany)	3–1	(England) Chelsea
Chelsea (England)	1–0	(Portugal) Benfica
Chelsea (England)	5–1	(Netherlands) Ajax
Qarabağ (Azerbaijan)	2–2	(England) Chelsea
Chelsea (England)	3–0	(Spain) Barcelona
Atalanta (Italy)	2–1	(England) Chelsea
Chelsea (England)	1–0	(Cyprus) Pafos
Napoli (Italy)	2–3	(England) Chelsea

===== Liverpool =====
Pos	Team	Pld	W	D	L	GF	GA	GD	Pts	Qualification
1	(The Football Association) Arsenal	8	8	0	0	23	4	+19	24	Advance to round of 16 (seeded)
2	(German Football Association) Bayern Munich	8	7	0	1	22	8	+14	21	Advance to round of 16 (seeded)
3	(The Football Association) Liverpool	8	6	0	2	20	8	+12	18	Advance to round of 16 (seeded)
4	(The Football Association) Tottenham Hotspur	8	5	2	1	17	7	+10	17	Advance to round of 16 (seeded)
5	(Royal Spanish Football Federation) Barcelona	8	5	1	2	22	14	+8	16	Advance to round of 16 (seeded)

Source: UEFA
Rules for classification: League phase tiebreakers

Home team	Score	Away team
Liverpool (England)	3–2	(Spain) Atlético Madrid
Galatasaray (Turkey)	1–0	(England) Liverpool
Eintracht Frankfurt (Germany)	1–5	(England) Liverpool
Liverpool (England)	1–0	(Spain) Real Madrid
Liverpool (England)	1–4	(Netherlands) PSV Eindhoven
Inter Milan (Italy)	0–1	(England) Liverpool
Marseille (France)	0–3	(England) Liverpool
Liverpool (England)	6–0	(Azerbaijan) Qarabağ

===== Manchester City =====
Pos	Team	Pld	W	D	L	GF	GA	GD	Pts	Qualification
6	(The Football Association) Chelsea	8	5	1	2	17	10	+7	16	Advance to round of 16 (seeded)
7	(Portuguese Football Federation) Sporting CP	8	5	1	2	17	11	+6	16	Advance to round of 16 (seeded)
8	(The Football Association) Manchester City	8	5	1	2	15	9	+6	16	Advance to round of 16 (seeded)
9	(Royal Spanish Football Federation) Real Madrid	8	5	0	3	21	12	+9	15	Advance to knockout phase play-offs (seeded)
10	(Italian Football Federation) Inter Milan	8	5	0	3	15	7	+8	15	Advance to knockout phase play-offs (seeded)

Source: UEFA
Rules for classification: League phase tiebreakers

Home team	Score	Away team
Manchester City (England)	2–0	(Italy) Napoli
Monaco (France)	2–2	(England) Manchester City
Villarreal (Spain)	0–2	(England) Manchester City
Manchester City (England)	4–1	(Germany) Borussia Dortmund
Manchester City (England)	0–2	(Germany) Bayer Leverkusen
Real Madrid (Spain)	1–2	(England) Manchester City
Bodø/Glimt (Norway)	3–1	(England) Manchester City
Manchester City (England)	2–0	(Turkey) Galatasaray

===== Newcastle United =====
Pos	Team	Pld	W	D	L	GF	GA	GD	Pts	Qualification
10	(Italian Football Federation) Inter Milan	8	5	0	3	15	7	+8	15	Advance to knockout phase play-offs (seeded)
11	(French Football Federation) Paris Saint-Germain	8	4	2	2	21	11	+10	14	Advance to knockout phase play-offs (seeded)
12	(The Football Association) Newcastle United	8	4	2	2	17	7	+10	14	Advance to knockout phase play-offs (seeded)
13	(Italian Football Federation) Juventus	8	3	4	1	14	10	+4	13	Advance to knockout phase play-offs (seeded)
14	(Royal Spanish Football Federation) Atlético Madrid	8	4	1	3	17	15	+2	13	Advance to knockout phase play-offs (seeded)

Source: UEFA
Rules for classification: League phase tiebreakers

Home team	Score	Away team
Newcastle United (England)	1–2	(Spain) Barcelona
Union Saint-Gilloise (Belgium)	0–4	(England) Newcastle United
Newcastle United (England)	3–0	(Portugal) Benfica
Newcastle United (England)	2–0	(Spain) Athletic Bilbao
Marseille (France)	2–1	(England) Newcastle United
Bayer Leverkusen (Germany)	2–2	(England) Newcastle United
Newcastle United (England)	3–0	(Netherlands) PSV Eindhoven
Paris Saint-Germain (France)	1–1	(England) Newcastle United

===== Tottenham Hotspur =====
Pos	Team	Pld	W	D	L	GF	GA	GD	Pts	Qualification
2	(German Football Association) Bayern Munich	8	7	0	1	22	8	+14	21	Advance to round of 16 (seeded)
3	(The Football Association) Liverpool	8	6	0	2	20	8	+12	18	Advance to round of 16 (seeded)
4	(The Football Association) Tottenham Hotspur	8	5	2	1	17	7	+10	17	Advance to round of 16 (seeded)
5	(Royal Spanish Football Federation) Barcelona	8	5	1	2	22	14	+8	16	Advance to round of 16 (seeded)
6	(The Football Association) Chelsea	8	5	1	2	17	10	+7	16	Advance to round of 16 (seeded)

Source: UEFA
Rules for classification: League phase tiebreakers

Home team	Score	Away team
Tottenham Hotspur (England)	1–0	(Spain) Villarreal
Bodø/Glimt (Norway)	2–2	(England) Tottenham Hotspur
Monaco (France)	0–0	(England) Tottenham Hotspur
Tottenham Hotspur (England)	4–0	(Denmark) Copenhagen
Paris Saint-Germain (France)	5–3	(England) Tottenham Hotspur
Tottenham Hotspur (England)	3–0	(Czech Republic) Slavia Prague
Tottenham Hotspur (England)	2–0	(Germany) Borussia Dortmund
Eintracht Frankfurt (Germany)	0–2	(England) Tottenham Hotspur

==== Knockout phase ====
===== Knockout phase play-offs =====
Team 1	Agg.	Team 2	1st leg	2nd leg
Qarabağ (Azerbaijan)	3–9	(England) Newcastle United	1–6	2–3

===== Round of 16 =====
Team 1	Agg.	Team 2	1st leg	2nd leg
Paris Saint-Germain (France)	8–2	(England) Chelsea	5–2	3–0
Galatasaray (Turkey)	1–4	(England) Liverpool	1–0	0–4
Real Madrid (Spain)	5–1	(England) Manchester City	3–0	2–1
Newcastle United (England)	3–8	(Spain) Barcelona	1–1	2–7
Atlético Madrid (Spain)	7–5	(England) Tottenham Hotspur	5–2	2–3
Bayer Leverkusen (Germany)	1–3	(England) Arsenal	1–1	0–2

===== Quarter-finals =====
Team 1	Agg.	Team 2	1st leg	2nd leg
Paris Saint-Germain (France)	4–0	(England) Liverpool	2–0	2–0
Sporting CP (Portugal)	0–1	(England) Arsenal	0–1	0–0

===== Semi-finals =====
Team 1	Agg.	Team 2	1st leg	2nd leg
Atlético Madrid (Spain)	1–2	(England) Arsenal	1–1	0–1

===== Final =====
30 May 2026
18:00 UTC+2

Paris Saint-Germain (French Football Federation)	1–1 (a.e.t.)	(The Football Association) Arsenal
Dembélé 65' (pen.)	Report	Havertz 6'
Penalties
Ramos (penalty scored); Doué (penalty scored); Mendes (penalty missed); Hakimi (penalty scored); Beraldo (penalty scored)	4–3	(penalty scored) Gyökeres; (penalty missed) Eze; (penalty scored) Rice; (penalty scored) Martinelli; (penalty missed) Gabriel

Puskás Aréna, Budapest
Attendance: 61,035
Referee: Daniel Siebert (Germany)

=== UEFA Europa League ===
==== League phase ====
===== Aston Villa =====
Pos	Team	Pld	W	D	L	GF	GA	GD	Pts	Qualification
1	(French Football Federation) Lyon	8	7	0	1	18	5	+13	21	Advance to round of 16 (seeded)
2	(The Football Association) Aston Villa	8	7	0	1	14	6	+8	21	Advance to round of 16 (seeded)
3	(Danish Football Association) Midtjylland	8	6	1	1	18	8	+10	19	Advance to round of 16 (seeded)
4	(Royal Spanish Football Federation) Real Betis	8	5	2	1	13	7	+6	17 (Note: Away goals scored: Real Betis 5, Porto 3.)	Advance to round of 16 (seeded)
5	(Portuguese Football Federation) Porto	8	5	2	1	13	7	+6	17	Advance to round of 16 (seeded)

Source: UEFA
Rules for classification: League phase tiebreakers
Notes:

Home team	Score	Away team
Aston Villa (England)	1–0	(Italy) Bologna
Feyenoord (Netherlands)	0–2	(England) Aston Villa
Go Ahead Eagles (Netherlands)	2–1	(England) Aston Villa
Aston Villa (England)	2–0	(Israel) Maccabi Tel Aviv
Aston Villa (England)	2–1	(Switzerland) Young Boys
Basel (Switzerland)	1–2	(England) Aston Villa
Fenerbahçe (Turkey)	0–1	(England) Aston Villa
Aston Villa (England)	3–2	(Austria) Red Bull Salzburg

===== Nottingham Forest =====
Pos	Team	Pld	W	D	L	GF	GA	GD	Pts	Qualification
11	(German Football Association) VfB Stuttgart	8	5	0	3	15	9	+6	15	Advance to knockout phase play-offs (seeded)
12	(Hungarian Football Federation) Ferencváros	8	4	3	1	12	11	+1	15	Advance to knockout phase play-offs (seeded)
13	(The Football Association) Nottingham Forest	8	4	2	2	15	7	+8	14	Advance to knockout phase play-offs (seeded)
14	(Football Association of the Czech Republic) Viktoria Plzeň	8	3	5	0	8	3	+5	14	Advance to knockout phase play-offs (seeded)
15	(Football Association of Serbia) Red Star Belgrade	8	4	2	2	7	6	+1	14	Advance to knockout phase play-offs (seeded)

Source: UEFA
Rules for classification: League phase tiebreakers

Home team	Score	Away team
Real Betis (Spain)	2–2	(England) Nottingham Forest
Nottingham Forest (England)	2–3	(Denmark) Midtjylland
Nottingham Forest (England)	2–0	(Portugal) Porto
Sturm Graz (Austria)	0–0	(England) Nottingham Forest
Nottingham Forest (England)	3–0	(Sweden) Malmö FF
Utrecht (Netherlands)	1–2	(England) Nottingham Forest
Braga (Portugal)	1–0	(England) Nottingham Forest
Nottingham Forest (England)	4–0	(Hungary) Ferencváros

==== Knockout phase ====
===== Knockout phase play-offs =====
Team 1	Agg.	Team 2	1st leg	2nd leg
Fenerbahçe (Turkey)	2–4	(England) Nottingham Forest	0–3	2–1

===== Round of 16 =====
Team 1	Agg.	Team 2	1st leg	2nd leg
Nottingham Forest (England)	2–2 (3–0 p)	(Denmark) Midtjylland	0–1	2–1 (a.e.t.)
Lille (France)	0–3	(England) Aston Villa	0–1	0–2

===== Quarter-finals =====
Team 1	Agg.	Team 2	1st leg	2nd leg
Porto (Portugal)	1–2	(England) Nottingham Forest	1–1	0–1
Bologna (Italy)	1–7	(England) Aston Villa	1–3	0–4

===== Semi-finals =====
Team 1	Agg.	Team 2	1st leg	2nd leg
Nottingham Forest (England)	1–4	(England) Aston Villa	1–0	0–4

===== Final =====
20 May 2026
21:00 (22:00 UTC+3)

SC Freiburg (Germany)	0–3	(The Football Association) Aston Villa
	Report	Tielemans 41'; Buendía 45+3'; Rogers 58'

Beşiktaş Stadium, Istanbul
Attendance: 37,324
Referee: François Letexier (France)

=== UEFA Conference League ===
==== Qualifying round ====
===== Play-off round =====
Play-off round
Team 1	Agg.	Team 2	1st leg	2nd leg
Crystal Palace (England)	1–0	(Norway) Fredrikstad	1–0	0–0

==== League phase ====
===== Crystal Palace =====
Pos	Team	Pld	W	D	L	GF	GA	GD	Pts	Qualification
8	(Cyprus Football Association) AEK Larnaca	6	3	3	0	7	1	+6	12	Advance to round of 16 (seeded)
9	(Swiss Football Association) Lausanne-Sport	6	3	2	1	6	3	+3	11	Advance to knockout phase play-offs (seeded)
10	(The Football Association) Crystal Palace	6	3	1	2	11	6	+5	10	Advance to knockout phase play-offs (seeded)
11	(Polish Football Association) Lech Poznań	6	3	1	2	12	8	+4	10	Advance to knockout phase play-offs (seeded)
12	(Turkish Football Federation) Samsunspor	6	3	1	2	10	6	+4	10	Advance to knockout phase play-offs (seeded)

Source: UEFA
Rules for classification: League phase tiebreakers

Home team	Score	Away team
Dynamo Kyiv (Ukraine)	0–2	(England) Crystal Palace
Crystal Palace (England)	0–1	(Cyprus) AEK Larnaca
Crystal Palace (England)	3–1	(Netherlands) AZ
Strasbourg (France)	2–1	(England) Crystal Palace
Shelbourne (Republic of Ireland)	0–3	(England) Crystal Palace
Crystal Palace (England)	2–2	(Finland) KuPS

==== Knockout phase ====
===== Knockout phase play-offs =====
Team 1	Agg.	Team 2	1st leg	2nd leg
Zrinjski Mostar (Bosnia and Herzegovina)	1–3	(England) Crystal Palace	1–1	0–2

===== Round of 16 =====
Team 1	Agg.	Team 2	1st leg	2nd leg
Crystal Palace (England)	2–1	(Cyprus) AEK Larnaca	0–0	2–1 (a.e.t.)

===== Quarter-finals =====
Team 1	Agg.	Team 2	1st leg	2nd leg
Crystal Palace (England)	4–2	(Italy) Fiorentina	3–0	1–2

===== Semi-finals =====
Team 1	Agg.	Team 2	1st leg	2nd leg
Shakhtar Donetsk (Ukraine)	2–5	(England) Crystal Palace	1–3	1–2

===== Final =====
27 May 2026
21:00 UTC+2

Crystal Palace (The Football Association)	1–0	(Royal Spanish Football Federation) Rayo Vallecano
Mateta 51'	Report

Red Bull Arena, Leipzig
Attendance: 39,176
Referee: Maurizio Mariani (Italy)

=== UEFA Women's Champions League ===
==== Qualifying rounds ====
===== Second qualifying round =====
====== Semi-finals ======
Semi-finals
Team 1	Score	Team 2
Manchester United (England)	4–0	(Netherlands) PSV Eindhoven

====== Final ======
Final
Team 1	Score	Team 2
Manchester United (England)	1–0	(Sweden) Hammarby

===== Third qualifying round =====
Third qualifying round
Team 1	Agg.	Team 2	1st leg	2nd leg
Brann (Norway)	1–3	(England) Manchester United	1–0	0–3

==== League stage ====
===== Arsenal =====
Pos	Team	Pld	W	D	L	GF	GA	GD	Pts	Qualification
3	(The Football Association) Chelsea	6	4	2	0	20	3	+17	14	Advance to the quarter-finals (seeded)
4	(German Football Association) Bayern Munich	6	4	1	1	14	13	+1	13	Advance to the quarter-finals (seeded)
5	(The Football Association) Arsenal	6	4	0	2	11	6	+5	12	Advance to the knockout phase play-offs (seeded)
6	(The Football Association) Manchester United	6	4	0	2	7	9	−2	12	Advance to the knockout phase play-offs (seeded)
7	(Royal Spanish Football Federation) Real Madrid	6	3	2	1	13	7	+6	11	Advance to the knockout phase play-offs (seeded)

Source: UEFA
Rules for classification: League phase tiebreakers

Home team	Score	Away team
Arsenal (England)	1–2	(France) Lyon
Benfica (Portugal)	0–2	(England) Arsenal
Bayern Munich (Germany)	3–2	(England) Arsenal
Arsenal (England)	2–1	(Spain) Real Madrid
Arsenal (England)	1–0	(Netherlands) Twente
OH Leuven (Belgium)	0–3	(England) Arsenal

===== Chelsea =====
Pos	Team	Pld	W	D	L	GF	GA	GD	Pts	Qualification
1	(Royal Spanish Football Federation) Barcelona	6	5	1	0	20	3	+17	16	Advance to the quarter-finals (seeded)
2	(French Football Federation) OL Lyonnes	6	5	1	0	18	5	+13	16	Advance to the quarter-finals (seeded)
3	(The Football Association) Chelsea	6	4	2	0	20	3	+17	14	Advance to the quarter-finals (seeded)
4	(German Football Association) Bayern Munich	6	4	1	1	14	13	+1	13	Advance to the quarter-finals (seeded)
5	(The Football Association) Arsenal	6	4	0	2	11	6	+5	12	Advance to the knockout phase play-offs (seeded)

Source: UEFA
Rules for classification: League phase tiebreakers

Home team	Score	Away team
Twente (Netherlands)	1–1	(England) Chelsea
Chelsea (England)	4–0	(France) Paris FC
St. Pölten (Austria)	0–6	(England) Chelsea
Chelsea (England)	1–1	(Spain) Barcelona
Chelsea (England)	6–0	(Italy) Roma
VfL Wolfsburg (Germany)	1–2	(England) Chelsea

===== Manchester United =====
Pos	Team	Pld	W	D	L	GF	GA	GD	Pts	Qualification
4	(German Football Association) Bayern Munich	6	4	1	1	14	13	+1	13	Advance to the quarter-finals (seeded)
5	(The Football Association) Arsenal	6	4	0	2	11	6	+5	12	Advance to the knockout phase play-offs (seeded)
6	(The Football Association) Manchester United	6	4	0	2	7	9	−2	12	Advance to the knockout phase play-offs (seeded)
7	(Royal Spanish Football Federation) Real Madrid	6	3	2	1	13	7	+6	11	Advance to the knockout phase play-offs (seeded)
8	(Italian Football Federation) Juventus	6	3	1	2	13	8	+5	10	Advance to the knockout phase play-offs (seeded)

Source: UEFA
Rules for classification: League phase tiebreakers

Home team	Score	Away team
Manchester United (England)	1–0	(Norway) Vålerenga
Atlético Madrid (Spain)	0–1	(England) Manchester United
Manchester United (England)	2–1	(France) Paris Saint-Germain
VfL Wolfsburg (Germany)	5–2	(England) Manchester United
Manchester United (England)	0–3	(France) Lyon
Juventus (Italy)	0–1	(England) Manchester United

==== Knockout phase ====
===== Knockout phase play-offs =====
Team 1	Agg.	Team 2	1st leg	2nd leg
Atlético Madrid (Spain)	0–5	(England) Manchester United	0–3	0–2
OH Leuven (Belgium)	1–7	(England) Arsenal	0–4	1–3

===== Quarter-finals =====
Team 1	Agg.	Team 2	1st leg	2nd leg
Manchester United (England)	3–5	(Germany) Bayern Munich	2–3	1–2
Arsenal (England)	3–2	(England) Chelsea	3–1	0–1

===== Semi-finals =====
Team 1	Agg.	Team 2	1st leg	2nd leg
Arsenal (England)	3–4	(France) Lyon	2–1	1–3

=== UEFA Youth League ===
==== UEFA Champions League Path ====
===== Arsenal =====
Pos	Team	Pld	W	D	L	GF	GA	GD	Pts
31	(Royal Belgian Football Association) Union Saint-Gilloise	6	1	1	4	7	18	−11	4
32	(Turkish Football Federation) Galatasaray	6	1	1	4	6	21	−15	4
33	(The Football Association) Arsenal	6	1	0	5	11	18	−7	3
34	(The Football Association) Newcastle United	6	0	0	6	6	17	−11	0
35	(Norwegian Football Federation) Bodø/Glimt	6	0	0	6	4	31	−27	0

Source: UEFA
Rules for classification: League phase tiebreakers

Home team	Score	Away team
Athletic Bilbao (Spain)	3–1	(England) Arsenal
Arsenal (England)	1–2	(Greece) Olympiacos
Arsenal (England)	3–4	(Spain) Atlético Madrid
Slavia Prague (Czech Republic)	5–1	(England) Arsenal
Arsenal (England)	4–2	(Germany) Bayern Munich
Club Brugge (Belgium)	2–1	(England) Arsenal

===== Chelsea =====
Pos	Team	Pld	W	D	L	GF	GA	GD	Pts	Qualification
1	(The Football Association) Chelsea	6	5	1	0	23	9	+14	16	Advance to knockout phase
2	(Portuguese Football Federation) Benfica	6	5	0	1	26	7	+19	15	Advance to knockout phase
3	(Royal Belgian Football Association) Club Brugge	6	5	0	1	11	3	+8	15	Advance to knockout phase
4	(Royal Spanish Football Federation) Real Madrid	6	5	0	1	14	7	+7	15	Advance to knockout phase
5	(Royal Spanish Football Federation) Villarreal	6	5	0	1	12	7	+5	15	Advance to knockout phase

Source: UEFA
Rules for classification: League phase tiebreakers

Home team	Score	Away team
Bayern Munich (Germany)	2–3	(England) Chelsea
Chelsea (England)	5–2	(Portugal) Benfica
Chelsea (England)	6–3	(Netherlands) Ajax
Qarabağ (Azerbaijan)	0–5	(England) Chelsea
Chelsea (England)	1–1	(Spain) Barcelona
Atalanta (Italy)	1–3	(England) Chelsea

===== Liverpool =====
Pos	Team	Pld	W	D	L	GF	GA	GD	Pts	Qualification
14	(Italian Football Federation) Inter Milan	6	3	2	1	14	8	+6	11	Advance to knockout phase
15	(Royal Dutch Football Association) Ajax	6	3	1	2	24	16	+8	10	Advance to knockout phase
16	(The Football Association) Liverpool	6	3	1	2	8	13	−5	10	Advance to knockout phase
17	(German Football Association) Bayer Leverkusen	6	3	1	2	9	16	−7	10	Advance to knockout phase
18	(French Football Federation) Monaco	6	3	0	3	20	10	+10	9	Advance to knockout phase

Source: UEFA
Rules for classification: League phase tiebreakers

Home team	Score	Away team
Liverpool (England)	0–0	(Spain) Atlético Madrid
Galatasaray (Turkey)	0–2	(England) Liverpool
Eintracht Frankfurt (Germany)	4–5	(England) Liverpool
Liverpool (England)	0–4	(Spain) Real Madrid
Liverpool (England)	1–0	(Netherlands) PSV Eindhoven
Inter Milan (Italy)	5–0	(England) Liverpool

===== Manchester City =====
Pos	Team	Pld	W	D	L	GF	GA	GD	Pts	Qualification
8	(Royal Spanish Football Federation) Barcelona	6	4	1	1	13	9	+4	13	Advance to knockout phase
9	(The Football Association) Tottenham Hotspur	6	4	0	2	28	14	+14	12	Advance to knockout phase
10	(The Football Association) Manchester City	6	4	0	2	18	8	+10	12	Advance to knockout phase
11	(German Football Association) Borussia Dortmund	6	4	0	2	13	8	+5	12	Advance to knockout phase
12	(Portuguese Football Federation) Sporting CP	6	3	3	0	13	10	+3	12	Advance to knockout phase

Source: UEFA
Rules for classification: League phase tiebreakers

Home team	Score	Away team
Manchester City (England)	2–0	(Italy) Napoli
Monaco (France)	3–5	(England) Manchester City
Villarreal (Spain)	2–1	(England) Manchester City
Manchester City (England)	0–3	(Germany) Borussia Dortmund
Manchester City (England)	6–0	(Germany) Bayer Leverkusen
Real Madrid (Spain)	0–4	(England) Manchester City

===== Newcastle United =====
Pos	Team	Pld	W	D	L	GF	GA	GD	Pts
32	(Turkish Football Federation) Galatasaray	6	1	1	4	6	21	−15	4
33	(The Football Association) Arsenal	6	1	0	5	11	18	−7	3
34	(The Football Association) Newcastle United	6	0	0	6	6	17	−11	0
35	(Norwegian Football Federation) Bodø/Glimt	6	0	0	6	4	31	−27	0
36	(Association of Football Federations of Azerbaijan) Qarabağ	6	0	0	6	1	30	−29	0

Source: UEFA
Rules for classification: League phase tiebreakers

Home team	Score	Away team
Newcastle United (England)	2–3	(Spain) Barcelona
Union Saint-Gilloise (Belgium)	2–0	(England) Newcastle United
Newcastle United (England)	1–5	(Portugal) Benfica
Newcastle United (England)	2–3	(Spain) Athletic Bilbao
Marseille (France)	2–0	(England) Newcastle United
Bayer Leverkusen (Germany)	2–1	(England) Newcastle United

===== Tottenham Hotspur =====
Pos	Team	Pld	W	D	L	GF	GA	GD	Pts	Qualification
7	(Royal Spanish Football Federation) Atlético Madrid	6	4	1	1	16	8	+8	13	Advance to knockout phase
8	(Royal Spanish Football Federation) Barcelona	6	4	1	1	13	9	+4	13	Advance to knockout phase
9	(The Football Association) Tottenham Hotspur	6	4	0	2	28	14	+14	12	Advance to knockout phase
10	(The Football Association) Manchester City	6	4	0	2	18	8	+10	12	Advance to knockout phase
11	(German Football Association) Borussia Dortmund	6	4	0	2	13	8	+5	12	Advance to knockout phase

Source: UEFA
Rules for classification: League phase tiebreakers

Home team	Score	Away team
Tottenham Hotspur (England)	5–3	(Spain) Villarreal
Bodø/Glimt (Norway)	0–6	(England) Tottenham Hotspur
Monaco (France)	2–4	(England) Tottenham Hotspur
Tottenham Hotspur (England)	2–3	(Denmark) Copenhagen
Paris Saint-Germain (France)	5–2	(England) Tottenham Hotspur
Tottenham Hotspur (England)	9–1	(Czech Republic) Slavia Prague

==== Domestic Champions Path ====
===== Second round =====
Team 1	Agg.	Team 2	1st leg	2nd leg
Skënderbeu (Albania)	1–7	(England) Aston Villa	1–1	0–6

===== Third round =====
Team 1	Agg.	Team 2	1st leg	2nd leg
Aston Villa (England)	3–4	(Netherlands) AZ	2–2	1–2

==== Knockout phase ====
===== Round of 32 =====
Round of 32
Home team	Score	Away team
Chelsea (England)	1–1 (7–6 p)	(Netherlands) PSV Eindhoven
Real Betis (Spain)	5–1	(England) Tottenham Hotspur
HJK (Finland)	3–3 (5–4 p)	(England) Manchester City
Žilina (Slovakia)	2–1	(England) Liverpool

===== Round of 16 =====
Round of 16
Home team	Score	Away team
Real Madrid (Spain)	1–0	(England) Chelsea

== League competitions (Men's) ==
League Division	Promoted to league ▲	Relegated from league ▼
Premier League	Leeds United ▲; Burnley ▲; Sunderland ▲	Leicester City ▼; Ipswich Town ▼; Southampton ▼
Championship	Birmingham City ▲; Wrexham ▲; Charlton Athletic ▲	Luton Town ▼; Plymouth Argyle ▼; Cardiff City ▼
League One	Doncaster Rovers ▲; Port Vale ▲; Bradford City ▲; AFC Wimbledon ▲	Crawley Town ▼; Bristol Rovers ▼; Cambridge United ▼; Shrewsbury Town ▼
League Two	Barnet ▲; Oldham Athletic ▲	Carlisle United ▼; Morecambe ▼
National League	Brackley Town ▲; Truro City ▲; Scunthorpe United ▲; Boreham Wood ▲	Dagenham & Redbridge ▼; Maidenhead United ▼; AFC Fylde ▼; Ebbsfleet United ▼

=== Premier League ===
Despite criticism about their style of play, Arsenal finally managed to pull over the line and secure their first league title since 2004; the Gunners led the table for virtually the entire season from October onwards and secured the title on the penultimate weekend, coupling the league title with an astonishing run all the way to the Champions League final in Budapest - and then just losing the final on penalties. In what turned out to be Pep Guardiola's final season at the helm, Manchester City finished 2nd, eventually paying the price for too many draws especially throughout 2026, including a run of four games without a win at the start of the year, all that in spite of remaining undefeated against Arsenal as well as winning both domestic cups.

The decision by Manchester United to sack manager Ruben Amorim after a tough first half of the season and hire Michael Carrick on an initial interim basis before being made permanent in May proved a masterstroke as the Red Devils stormed their way to 3rd place to return to the Champions League after a three-year absence. Also returning to the Champions League were Aston Villa, who enjoyed a fantastic season; despite a terrible start, the Villains rapidly scaled the table and at Christmas even looked likely of mounting a shock title challenge; that did not come true by virtue of several poor runs of form in 2026, eventually finishing fourth, but it was in Europe where they stunned everyone as Villa secured just their second European title (and their first since 1982) and their first trophy in 30 years by winning the Europa League, winning all but two of their games all the way to the final to secure coach Unai Emery's fifth title in the competition. The final Champions League spot went to Liverpool; much like their last title win in 2020, the Reds' title defence fell apart after a good start to the season - not helped by pre-season struggles, including the tragic death of forward Diogo Jota, and injuries - with several heavy losses and poor patches of form throughout the season consigning the Merseyside club to 5th place, increasing fan scrutiny on head coach Arne Slot and ultimately costing him his job days after the season ended.

AFC Bournemouth enjoyed their best ever campaign; despite being tipped to struggle following the high-profile departures of the summer, an electric start to the season saw the club standing in 2nd place in late October; failure to pick up a win until early January saw the Cherries slide all the way to 15th place, but they more than made up for it after that point with an impressive 18-match unbeaten streak, only too many draws preventing the south coast club from an astonishing top five finish – although they still managed to secure their very first European foray for next season by virtue of a 6th-place finish (the highest in their history) in what turned out to be Andoni Iraola's final season. Sunderland finished in 7th; the club enjoyed the best season for a newly promoted club in seven years, spending the first half of the season mounting an astonishing Champions League challenge before fading away from December onwards; the Black Cats recovered impressively in the closing stages to secure their first European campaign in 53 years as well as their highest finish in 25 years, on top of winning both games against bitter rivals Newcastle United. The final side to secure European qualification were Brighton; the Seagulls looked like remaining in mid-table for virtually the entire season before a late surge propelled them into the European positions as they eventually finished 8th.

Another side to defy expectations was Brentford; the Bees were expected to struggle following the high-profile departures of the summer as well as the hiring of inexperienced manager Keith Andrews following the loss of highly-regarded manager Thomas Frank, but managed to solidify themselves in the top half of the table and remain in the hunt for Europe until the dying minutes of the season. Chelsea endured yet another mediocre season, a reasonable start falling apart in the festive period and leading to the sacking of manager Enzo Maresca; his replacement in Liam Rosenior oversaw a temporary improvement in form, but a horrendous run of form in the spring coupled with a heavy aggregate defeat at the Champions League round of 16 saw him sacked and killed any hopes for the Blues who failed to secure a European campaign for next season, only a year after winning the Conference League and less than 12 months after winning the Club World Cup. Fulham, Newcastle United and Everton endured similarly disappointing seasons, the Magpies never looking like once again finishing in the European positions and eventually finishing 12th, on top of losing both games against bitter rivals Sunderland - despite reaching the Champions League round of 16, whilst Fulham, in what turned out to be Marco Silva's final season, and Everton, in David Moyes' first full season back at the helm and their first campaign at Hill Dickinson Stadium, had to settle for 11th and 13th respectively for the second successive campaign. A good start for Crystal Palace fell rapidly apart, the Eagles winning just four games from mid-December onwards to secure a 15th-place finish; it was in Europe, however, where they enjoyed success by winning the Conference League in what was their first participation in any European competition in what turned out to be Oliver Glasner's final season in charge. Besides Sunderland, another newly promoted side in Leeds United survived; the Whites looked like struggling early on, before several great runs of form from December propelled the West Yorkshire club away from danger and into 14th place, only missing out on a potential top-half finish and being prevented from an astonishing race for European qualification by virtue of several draws as well as a return of just two away wins.

After eight years in the top flight and a succession of lower place finishes and relegation escapes, Wolverhampton Wanderers' luck finally ran out and the Old Gold endured the drop, spending virtually the entire season bottom of the table whilst also enduring the worst start in Premier League history, winning their first game in early January. Next to go down were Burnley, the club paying the price for winning just one game from November onwards as they endured an immediate return to the Championship and ensuring a fifth consecutive season alternating between the top two divisions with manager Scott Parker departing following relegation. The battle for the last relegation place went to the last day; West Ham were the unlucky side to go down, paying the price for a terrible first half of the season with manager Graham Potter getting sacked just five games into the campaign - despite his replacement in Nuno Espirito Santo leading the club to an improved second half which saw the Hammers take the battle for survival to the last day, they were unable to see out as their 14-year top flight run (the joint-longest of any side not including the top six, Aston Villa and Everton) came to an end (whilst finishing with the most points earned by a relegated side in 15 years) amid off-field anger towards the ownership. Despite a good start falling apart in terrible fashion under Thomas Frank and then enduring an even more disastrous spell under Igor Tudor which saw the club fall into the relegation zone, Tottenham Hotspur recovered just enough under Italian Roberto De Zerbi to secure survival and continue their 48-year presence among the elite, whereas Nottingham Forest endured a very turbulent campaign, changing managers three times and remaining deep into relegation trouble until a late improvement under Vitor Pereira saw the Reds secure their survival for another season, on top of reaching the Europa League semi-finals.

Pos	Team	Pld	W	D	L	GF	GA	GD	Pts	Qualification or relegation
1	Arsenal (C)	38	26	7	5	71	27	+44	85	Qualification for the Champions League league phase (Note: The Premier League gained an additional Champions League place as a result of England gaining one of the two European Performance Spots (EPS) awarded to the two associations with the highest UEFA coefficient points in 2025–26.)
2	Manchester City	38	23	9	6	77	35	+42	78	Qualification for the Champions League league phase
3	Manchester United	38	20	11	7	69	50	+19	71	Qualification for the Champions League league phase
4	Aston Villa	38	19	8	11	56	49	+7	65	Qualification for the Champions League league phase
5	Liverpool	38	17	9	12	63	53	+10	60	Qualification for the Champions League league phase
6	Bournemouth	38	13	18	7	58	54	+4	57	Qualification for the Europa League league phase (Note: Since the winners of the 2025–26 FA Cup and 2025–26 EFL Cup, Manchester City, qualified for the Champions League by league position, the spot reserved for the FA Cup winners (Europa League league phase) was passed to the seventh-placed team, and the spot reserved for the EFL Cup winners (Conference League play-off round) was passed to the eighth-placed team.)
7	Sunderland	38	14	12	12	42	48	−6	54	Qualification for the Europa League league phase
8	Brighton & Hove Albion	38	14	11	13	52	46	+6	53	Qualification for the Conference League play-off round
9	Brentford	38	14	11	13	55	52	+3	53	
10	Chelsea	38	14	10	14	58	52	+6	52	
11	Fulham	38	15	7	16	47	51	−4	52	
12	Newcastle United	38	14	7	17	53	55	−2	49	
13	Everton	38	13	10	15	47	50	−3	49	
14	Leeds United	38	11	14	13	49	56	−7	47	
15	Crystal Palace	38	11	12	15	41	51	−10	45	Qualification for the Europa League league phase (Note: Crystal Palace qualified for the Europa League league phase as the 2025–26 UEFA Conference League winners.)
16	Nottingham Forest	38	11	11	16	48	51	−3	44	
17	Tottenham Hotspur	38	10	11	17	48	57	−9	41	
18	West Ham United (R)	38	10	9	19	46	65	−19	39	Relegation to EFL Championship
19	Burnley (R)	38	4	10	24	38	75	−37	22	Relegation to EFL Championship
20	Wolverhampton Wanderers (R)	38	3	11	24	27	68	−41	20	Relegation to EFL Championship

Source: Premier League
Rules for classification: 1) Points; 2) Goal difference; 3) Goals scored; 4) If the champions, relegated teams or qualified teams for UEFA competitions cannot be determined by rules 1 to 3, rules 4.1 to 4.3 are applied – 4.1) Points gained in head-to-head record between such teams; 4.2) Away goals scored in head-to-head record between such teams; 4.3) Play-offs
(C) Champions; (R) Relegated

=== Championship ===
After several near-misses and heartbreak during the last few years, and after having played in League Two as recently as 2018, Coventry City finally ended their 25-year exile from the Premier League in style; in Frank Lampard's first full season in charge, the Sky Blues went on a blistering early run of form, claiming first place for nearly the entire season, with only a poor run of form in the winter preventing the club from breaking points and goalscoring records. The race for second place was settled in the final minutes of the season and was won by Ipswich Town; the Tractor Boys overcame a slow start, solidifying themselves in the top six from December onwards and taking advantage of going into the last few weeks with games in hand, eventually coming on top to bounce back from their relegation last year and give manager Kieran McKenna his third promotion with the club in four seasons. Southampton and Hull City prevailed at the play-off semi-finals to reach the final at Wembley - only for the Saints to be expelled from the playoffs altogether days before the final after being found guilty of spying on playoff opponents Middlesbrough, the Boro taking their place instead - the final saw Hull win out right at the death, ending both a nine-year exile from the top flight and a remarkable first season under Bosnian manager Sergej Jakirović that first saw two transfer bans imposed on the Tigers and the club scrape into the playoff places in the closing minutes of the campaign - a feat made even more impressive considering the fact the Tigers avoided relegation into League One last year by virtue of goal difference.

Wrexham secured the best league finish in their history, having returned to the second tier after 43 years away; the Welsh club skyrocketed into the top six by virtue of a great run of form at the turn of the year, putting behind them a mediocre start and only failing to secure a play-off place by virtue of several heavy defeats as the season petered out. Last season's losing play-off finalists Sheffield United endured a nightmare start to the season, losing eleven of their first fourteen games before an improvement in form following the return of influential manager Chris Wilder (who had departed after the end of last season and was replaced by Rubén Sellés) saw the Blades secure a mid-table finish. Norwich City had a similar season, a terrible start under manager Liam Manning finding the Canaries languishing deep into the relegation zone by late 2025; the club oversaw a massive improvement in form in 2026 under new manager Philippe Clement, ultimately finishing in 9th place. However, Stoke City's season was the opposite to the Canaries as its first full season under Mark Robins saw the club mount its first serious promotion push since being relegated from the Premier League in 2018, but an injury crisis coupled with a run of just six wins from December onwards plunged the Potters into the bottom half of the table and 17th place.

The relegation battle was largely impacted by points deductions for financial reasons; Sheffield Wednesday suffered the heaviest of them (18 points docked over two deductions) and thus ended up finishing on zero points, becoming the first side in English Football League history to do so; even without the 18-point deduction, however, the Owls, placed into administration in October, would still have finished as the worst side in any 24-team format in the Football League as they won just two games, setting a string of negative records and only avoiding another points deduction next season by virtue of a last-minute takeover. Making greater headlines was Leicester City's relegation; on the 10th anniversary of their illustrious Premier League title-winning campaign, the Foxes endured a shocking fall from grace, a decent start falling terribly apart in 2026 in conjunction with a six-point deduction imposed in early February for financial reasons as the East Midlands club fell into the third tier for the first time in 17 years, thus suffering the indignity of a second successive relegation. Last to go down were Oxford United, the club suffering from second-season syndrome, even an improvement in form in the spring following the hiring of Matt Bloomfield not enough to save the U's from the drop. Several more sides came perilously close to relegation throughout the season, including West Bromwich Albion - having two points docked in late April - Blackburn Rovers and Portsmouth, with all of them securing good runs of form in the closing weeks, enough to preserve their Championship status - with Blackburn emerging as the side which would have been relegated in the case Leicester and West Brom suffered no points deductions (though even in that situation, Leicester would only have stayed up on goal difference).

Pos	Team	Pld	W	D	L	GF	GA	GD	Pts	Promotion, qualification or relegation
1	Coventry City (C, P)	46	28	11	7	97	45	+52	95	Promotion to the Premier League
2	Ipswich Town (P)	46	23	15	8	80	47	+33	84	Promotion to the Premier League
3	Millwall	46	24	11	11	64	49	+15	83	Qualification for the Championship play-offs
4	Southampton (Note: Southampton qualified for the play-offs and defeated Middlesbrough to qualify for the final, but were subsequently disqualified for multiple breaches of EFL regulations related to the unauthorised filming of other clubs' training, with Middlesbrough taking their place in the play-off final.) (D)	46	22	14	10	82	56	+26	80	Qualification for the Championship play-offs
5	Middlesbrough	46	22	14	10	72	47	+25	80	Qualification for the Championship play-offs
6	Hull City (O, P)	46	21	10	15	70	66	+4	73	Qualification for the Championship play-offs
7	Wrexham	46	19	14	13	69	65	+4	71	
8	Derby County	46	20	9	17	67	59	+8	69	
9	Norwich City	46	19	8	19	63	56	+7	65	
10	Birmingham City	46	17	13	16	57	56	+1	64	
11	Swansea City	46	18	10	18	57	59	−2	64	
12	Bristol City	46	17	11	18	59	59	0	62	
13	Sheffield United	46	18	6	22	66	66	0	60	
14	Preston North End	46	15	15	16	55	62	−7	60	
15	Queens Park Rangers	46	16	10	20	61	73	−12	58	
16	Watford	46	14	15	17	53	65	−12	57	
17	Stoke City	46	15	10	21	51	56	−5	55	
18	Portsmouth	46	14	13	19	49	64	−15	55	
19	Charlton Athletic	46	13	14	19	44	58	−14	53	
20	Blackburn Rovers	46	13	13	20	42	56	−14	52	
21	West Bromwich Albion	46	13	14	19	48	58	−10	51 (Note: West Bromwich Albion were deducted two points on 24 April 2026 for breaching PSR rules.)	
22	Oxford United (R)	46	11	14	21	45	59	−14	47	Relegation to EFL League One
23	Leicester City (R)	46	12	16	18	58	68	−10	46 (Note: Leicester City were deducted six points on 5 February 2026 for breaching PSR rules.)	Relegation to EFL League One
24	Sheffield Wednesday (R)	46	2	12	32	29	89	−60	0 (Note: Sheffield Wednesday were deducted twelve points due to filing for administration on 24 October 2025, then deducted a further six points on 1 December 2025 for failing to fulfil payment obligations.)	Relegation to EFL League One

Source: EFL Official Website
Rules for classification: 1) Points; 2) Goal difference; 3) Number of goals scored; 4) Head-to-head results; 5) Wins; 6) Away goals; 7) Penalty points (sec 9.5); 8) Number of 12-point sending off offences; 9) Play-off (only if needed to determine promotion/relegation)
(C) Champions; (D) Disqualified; (O) Play-off winners; (P) Promoted; (R) Relegated

=== League One ===
A storming run of form after late November, including an impressive 29-match unbeaten run was enough for Lincoln City to pull over the line and end in spectacular fashion their 65-year exile from the second tier, breaking the 100-point barrier in the process. Cardiff City finished 2nd; the Welsh club had actually led the table for most of the season, ultimately falling to 2nd by virtue of indifferent form in the spring coupled with Lincoln's meteoric rise. After several near-misses during the last few years, Bolton Wanderers emerged victorious from the play-offs to finally end their seven-year exile from the Championship, having spent the entire season from November onwards in the top six.

Bradford City's first season back in the third tier since 2019 was an absolute success, the club mounting a serious promotion challenge and even leading the table early in the season, only falling away from the top two by virtue of a poor goalscoring record (the second poorest of the top half of the table) as well as indifferent away form, contrary to their impressive home one. Both Luton and Plymouth failed to mount a serious challenge for an immediate return to the second tier, Luton being made to pay for indifferent form across the campaign despite a great run of form in the closing weeks, whereas Plymouth paid the price for terrible form early on which saw the club battling against a second successive relegation, having spent almost the entire first half of the season in the bottom four; just like the Hatters, the Pilgrims went on a terrific run of form late on, but it still proved to not be enough. Last season's play-off finalists Leyton Orient struggled in mid-table for the first half of the season and fell into the relegation mire by virtue of terrible form in 2026, in a season that greatly echoed the one after they last made they play-off final in 2014; this time, however, the O's pulled over the line and survived, despite enduring a late scare by ending the season on an eight match winless streak.

Despite decent form early on, Northampton Town's season fell dramatically apart, the Cobblers winning just two games from December onwards and ending the season on a disastrous ten match losing streak, finishing bottom and ending their three-year stay in League One. Rotherham United finished above them, the Millers also seeing their season fall completely apart after December, returning to the Football League's basement tier after 13 years. Port Vale finished in 22nd, the club never looking likely of avoiding an immediate drop back to League Two and only avoiding finishing bottom by virtue of several wins throughout 2026, despite a spectacular FA Cup run that saw them go all the way to the quarter-finals for the club's best cup run in 72 years. Exeter City completed the bottom four; much like the two bottom sides, the club made a relatively decent start and a good run of form in the winter saw the Grecians in 10th place in late January; a run of just one win after that point, including a fifteen-match winless streak, cost the Devon club its four-year presence in the third tier. AFC Wimbledon avoided the drop by virtue of an excellent start to the season, seeing them recording 25 points in 13 games. A lengthy injury crisis striking a thin squad saw the club limping to the finishing line, only just securing safety despite nine defeats in the last eleven.

Pos	Team	Pld	W	D	L	GF	GA	GD	Pts	Promotion, qualification or relegation
1	Lincoln City (C, P)	46	31	10	5	89	41	+48	103	Promotion to EFL Championship
2	Cardiff City (P)	46	27	10	9	90	50	+40	91	Promotion to EFL Championship
3	Stockport County	46	22	11	13	71	58	+13	77	Qualification for League One play-offs
4	Bradford City	46	22	11	13	58	51	+7	77	Qualification for League One play-offs
5	Bolton Wanderers (O, P)	46	19	18	9	70	52	+18	75	Qualification for League One play-offs
6	Stevenage	46	21	12	13	49	46	+3	75	Qualification for League One play-offs
7	Luton Town	46	21	11	14	68	56	+12	74	
8	Plymouth Argyle	46	22	7	17	75	63	+12	73	
9	Huddersfield Town	46	18	13	15	74	64	+10	67	
10	Mansfield Town	46	16	17	13	62	50	+12	65	
11	Wycombe Wanderers	46	17	12	17	69	58	+11	63	
12	Reading	46	16	15	15	64	60	+4	63	
13	Blackpool	46	17	9	20	54	65	−11	60	
14	Doncaster Rovers	46	17	9	20	50	69	−19	60	
15	Barnsley	46	15	14	17	68	73	−5	59	
16	Wigan Athletic	46	14	14	18	49	58	−9	56	
17	Burton Albion	46	13	15	18	50	60	−10	54	
18	Peterborough United	46	15	8	23	64	68	−4	53	
19	AFC Wimbledon	46	15	8	23	51	72	−21	53	
20	Leyton Orient	46	14	10	22	59	71	−12	52	
21	Exeter City (R)	46	12	13	21	52	61	−9	49	Relegation to EFL League Two
22	Port Vale (R)	46	10	12	24	36	61	−25	42	Relegation to EFL League Two
23	Rotherham United (R)	46	10	11	25	41	71	−30	41	Relegation to EFL League Two
24	Northampton Town (R)	46	9	8	29	39	74	−35	35	Relegation to EFL League Two

Source: EFL Official Website
Rules for classification: 1) Points; 2) Goal difference; 3) Number of goals scored; 4) Head-to-head results; 5) Wins; 6) Away goals; 7) Penalty points (sec 9.5); 8) 12-point sending off offences
(C) Champions; (O) Play-off winners; (P) Promoted; (R) Relegated

=== League Two ===
Bromley continued their rise up the English league system, winning the title and promotion to League One in just their second-ever season in the Football League - claiming the title on the last day, with indifferent form after winning promotion nearly seeing them fall away from the top. Milton Keynes Dons recovered well from their relegation scare the previous season and returned to League One after an absence of three years, only narrowly missing out on the title on the final day of the season. Cambridge United took the final automatic promotion spot in a dramatic finish to the campaign, bouncing back to League One at the first attempt, an impressive run of form that saw only 3 defeats from November onwards helping the U's. Three years after returning to the Football League, Notts County secured another promotion through the play-offs to return to League One for the first time since 2015 - comfortably defeating Salford City in the play-off final.

Barnet and Oldham Athletic both enjoyed successful returns to the Football League, with Barnet being in with a chance of making the play-offs right until the final day, and Oldham enjoying a season of stability. Walsall once again spent the first half of the season leading the table and looking to make up for their promotion near-miss the previous season, only for their form to implode even more dramatically than it had done a year earlier, leading to the sacking of manager Mat Sadler with any hope of even so much as a play-off spot all but over by the start of March. Bristol Rovers endured a topsy-turvy season that saw them start out looking set to challenge for promotion after successful former manager Darrell Clarke returned for a second stint in charge, only for Clarke to be sacked shortly before Christmas following a horrific run that saw them gain just four points in 20 matches, before powering to mid-table safety with a return of 11 wins from 13 matches after the appointment of the experienced Steve Evans. Newport County looked to be heading out of the Football League for most of the campaign, but a turnaround under the unheralded Austrian manager Christian Fuchs saw them dramatically secure safety on the final day.

Barrow's second spell in the Football League came to an end after just six years, following a chaotic season in which five different managers took charge of the team at different points in the campaign; their poor defensive record ultimately proved their undoing, leading to them entering the final day of the season all but relegated despite being in with a mathematical chance of survival. Harrogate Town, who coincidentally had been promoted alongside Barrow in 2020, were relegated back to the National League with them, after spending nearly the entire campaign in the bottom two; a late revival in form did at least see them take their survival fight to the final day, but a late loss resulted in them being relegated, and deprived the Football League of a first North Yorkshire derby since 1993 (when York City and the now defunct Scarborough had both been in the same division).

Pos	Team	Pld	W	D	L	GF	GA	GD	Pts	Promotion, qualification or relegation
1	Bromley (C, P)	46	24	15	7	71	46	+25	87	Promotion to EFL League One
2	Milton Keynes Dons (P)	46	24	14	8	86	45	+41	86	Promotion to EFL League One
3	Cambridge United (P)	46	22	16	8	66	33	+33	82	Promotion to EFL League One
4	Salford City	46	25	6	15	61	51	+10	81	Qualification for League Two play-offs
5	Notts County (O, P)	46	24	8	14	74	52	+22	80	Qualification for League Two play-offs
6	Chesterfield	46	21	16	9	71	56	+15	79	Qualification for League Two play-offs
7	Grimsby Town	46	22	12	12	74	50	+24	78	Qualification for League Two play-offs
8	Barnet	46	21	13	12	70	53	+17	76	
9	Swindon Town	46	22	9	15	70	59	+11	75	
10	Oldham Athletic	46	18	14	14	60	44	+16	68	
11	Crewe Alexandra	46	19	10	17	64	58	+6	67	
12	Colchester United	46	18	12	16	62	49	+13	66	
13	Walsall	46	18	11	17	56	56	0	65	
14	Bristol Rovers	46	19	5	22	56	65	−9	62	
15	Fleetwood Town	46	15	16	15	57	58	−1	61	
16	Accrington Stanley	46	14	11	21	47	58	−11	53	
17	Gillingham	46	13	14	19	53	72	−19	53	
18	Cheltenham Town	46	14	10	22	53	79	−26	52	
19	Shrewsbury Town	46	13	10	23	42	69	−27	49	
20	Newport County	46	12	7	27	48	77	−29	43	
21	Tranmere Rovers	46	10	11	25	54	79	−25	41	
22	Crawley Town	46	8	16	22	44	68	−24	40	
23	Harrogate Town (R)	46	10	9	27	39	68	−29	39	Relegation to National League
24	Barrow (R)	46	9	9	28	45	78	−33	36	Relegation to National League

Source: EFL Official Website
Rules for classification: 1) Points; 2) Goal difference; 3) Number of goals scored; 4) Head-to-head results; 5) Wins; 6) Away goals; 7) Penalty points (sec 9.5); 8) 12-point sending off offences
(C) Champions; (O) Play-off winners; (P) Promoted; (R) Relegated

=== National League ===
In an incredibly dramatic end to the season, York City won the title and returned to the Football League after a decade away, scoring a 103rd-minute equaliser in their title decider with runners-up Rochdale, who were consigned to the play-offs despite earning 106 points. Rochdale would ultimately secure their own return to the Football League in similarly dramatic circumstances, via a late equaliser and penalty shoot-out against Boreham Wood, but them finishing second with such a large points haul (and the fact that York would have finished second with 107 points if not for their equaliser, a year after coming second with 98 points) would lead to renewed calls to allocate a second automatic promotion place from the National League.

Truro City's first ever season at this level resulted in an immediate relegation back to the National League South, as the Cornish club fell into the relegation zone during the first weekend of the season and ultimately never left it. Braintree fell back into the National League South after two seasons at this level. Morecambe suffered the indignity of a second successive relegation, never really recovering from a delayed start to the season after they almost went out of business, with even a late improvement after the return of successful former manager Jim Bentley not being enough to save them, as their conceding over 100 goals ultimately doomed them. Brackley Town occupied the final relegation spot; like Truro, their first-ever season at this level resulted in an immediate relegation back to the sixth tier, though they were in with a shout of survival until the final weeks.

Pos	Team	Pld	W	D	L	GF	GA	GD	Pts	Promotion, qualification or relegation
1	York City (C, P)	46	33	9	4	114	41	+73	108	Promotion to EFL League Two
2	Rochdale (O, P)	46	33	7	6	88	41	+47	106	Qualification for National League play-off semi-finals
3	Carlisle United	46	29	8	9	87	51	+36	95	Qualification for National League play-off semi-finals
4	Boreham Wood	46	27	9	10	95	58	+37	90	Qualification for the National League play-off quarter-finals
5	Scunthorpe United	46	23	13	10	77	62	+15	82	Qualification for the National League play-off quarter-finals
6	Southend United	46	23	12	11	83	47	+36	81	Qualification for the National League play-off quarter-finals
7	Forest Green Rovers	46	23	12	11	82	52	+30	81	Qualification for the National League play-off quarter-finals
8	FC Halifax Town	46	20	10	16	69	66	+3	70	
9	Hartlepool United	46	18	14	14	54	59	−5	68	
10	Woking	46	16	15	15	69	54	+15	63	
11	Tamworth	46	17	11	18	63	71	−8	62	
12	Boston United	46	15	14	17	63	67	−4	59	
13	Altrincham	46	17	6	23	55	65	−10	57	
14	Solihull Moors	46	14	14	18	71	72	−1	56	
15	Wealdstone	46	15	11	20	67	74	−7	56	
16	Yeovil Town	46	15	6	25	48	68	−20	51	
17	Eastleigh	46	13	11	22	57	80	−23	50	
18	Gateshead	46	14	8	24	54	90	−36	50	
19	Sutton United	46	11	14	21	59	79	−20	47	
20	Aldershot Town	46	13	7	26	69	87	−18	46	
21	Brackley Town (R)	46	10	12	24	40	75	−35	42	Relegation to National League North
22	Morecambe (R)	46	9	11	26	66	103	−37	38	Relegation to National League North
23	Braintree Town (R)	46	8	12	26	38	76	−38	36	Relegation to National League South
24	Truro City (R)	46	8	10	28	42	72	−30	34	Relegation to National League South

Source: National League official site
Rules for classification: 1) Points; 2) Goal difference; 3) Number of goals scored; 4) Number of matches won; 5) Head-to-head results
(C) Champions; (O) Play-off winners; (P) Promoted; (R) Relegated

==== North ====
Pos	Team	Pld	W	D	L	GF	GA	GD	Pts	Promotion, qualification or relegation
1	AFC Fylde (C, P)	46	32	4	10	112	51	+61	100	Promotion to the National League
2	South Shields	46	28	11	7	99	43	+56	95	Qualification for the National League North play-off semi-finals
3	Kidderminster Harriers (O, P)	46	25	12	9	74	51	+23	87	Qualification for the National League North play-off semi-finals
4	Macclesfield	46	24	7	15	81	68	+13	79	Qualification for the National League North play-off quarter-finals
5	Buxton	46	22	7	17	83	61	+22	73	Qualification for the National League North play-off quarter-finals
6	Scarborough Athletic	46	19	16	11	61	52	+9	73	Qualification for the National League North play-off quarter-finals
7	Chester	46	20	13	13	66	64	+2	73	Qualification for the National League North play-off quarter-finals
8	Merthyr Town	46	22	4	20	95	86	+9	70	
9	Darlington	46	20	9	17	78	68	+10	69	
10	Spennymoor Town	46	19	11	16	62	69	−7	68	
11	AFC Telford United	46	17	14	15	85	65	+20	65	
12	Marine	46	18	8	20	62	72	−10	62	
13	Radcliffe	46	18	6	22	76	83	−7	60	
14	Southport	46	16	12	18	64	71	−7	60	
15	Chorley	46	15	12	19	66	65	+1	57	
16	Worksop Town	46	16	9	21	66	74	−8	57	
17	Oxford City	46	15	11	20	62	67	−5	56	
18	Bedford Town	46	13	14	19	66	77	−11	53	
19	King's Lynn Town	46	12	16	18	56	64	−8	52	
20	Hereford	46	14	10	22	64	79	−15	52	
21	Curzon Ashton (R)	46	13	13	20	67	88	−21	52	Relegation to the Northern Premier League Premier Division
22	Alfreton Town (R)	46	12	14	20	49	82	−33	50	Relegation to the Northern Premier League Premier Division
23	Peterborough Sports (R)	46	10	9	27	51	96	−45	39	Relegation to the Southern League Premier Division Central
24	Leamington (R)	46	7	8	31	41	90	−49	29	Relegation to the Southern League Premier Division Central

Source: National League official site
Rules for classification: 1) Points; 2) Goal difference; 3) Number of goals scored; 4) Number of matches won; 5) Head-to-head results
(C) Champions; (O) Play-off winners; (P) Promoted; (R) Relegated

==== South ====
Pos	Team	Pld	W	D	L	GF	GA	GD	Pts	Promotion, qualification or relegation
1	Worthing (C, P)	46	25	9	12	99	52	+47	84	Promotion to the National League
2	Hornchurch (O, P)	46	23	12	11	81	64	+17	81	Qualification for the National League South play-off semi-finals
3	Torquay United	46	24	8	14	87	62	+25	80	Qualification for the National League South play-off semi-finals
4	Dorking Wanderers	46	23	10	13	78	61	+17	79	Qualification for the National League South play-off quarter-finals
5	Hemel Hempstead Town	46	23	10	13	55	48	+7	79	Qualification for the National League South play-off quarter-finals
6	Weston-super-Mare	46	23	9	14	61	48	+13	78	Qualification for the National League South play-off quarter-finals
7	Maidenhead United	46	22	11	13	66	41	+25	77	Qualification for the National League South play-off quarter-finals
8	Maidstone United	46	22	11	13	72	50	+22	77	
9	Ebbsfleet United	46	22	11	13	73	54	+19	77	
10	Chelmsford City	46	21	10	15	73	62	+11	73	
11	Chesham United	46	21	9	16	68	55	+13	72	
12	AFC Totton	46	20	6	20	60	79	−19	66	
13	Dagenham & Redbridge	46	17	13	16	61	62	−1	64	
14	Tonbridge Angels	46	16	12	18	66	65	+1	60	
15	Horsham	46	15	14	17	53	54	−1	59	
16	Slough Town	46	15	9	22	69	87	−18	54	
17	Salisbury	46	14	11	21	50	65	−15	53	
18	Hampton & Richmond Borough	46	14	11	21	56	72	−16	53	
19	Farnborough	46	14	11	21	72	92	−20	53	
20	Dover Athletic	46	13	11	22	60	75	−15	50	
21	Bath City (R)	46	10	13	23	50	77	−27	43	Relegation to the Southern League Premier Division South
22	Chippenham Town (R)	46	11	9	26	53	80	−27	42	Relegation to the Southern League Premier Division South
23	Enfield Town (R)	46	9	13	24	55	82	−27	40	Relegation to the Isthmian League Premier Division
24	Eastbourne Borough (R)	46	9	9	28	59	90	−31	36	Relegation to the Isthmian League Premier Division

Source: National League official site
Rules for classification: 1) Points; 2) Goal difference; 3) Number of goals scored; 4) Number of matches won; 5) Head-to-head results
(C) Champions; (O) Play-off winners; (P) Promoted; (R) Relegated

=== League play-offs ===
==== Football League play-offs ====
===== EFL Championship =====
====== Final ======
23 May 2026
15:30 BST

Hull City	1−0	Middlesbrough
McBurnie 90+5'	Report

Wembley Stadium, London
Attendance: 84,506
Referee: Jarred Gillett

===== EFL League One =====
====== Final ======
24 May 2026
13:00 BST

Stockport County	1–4	Bolton Wanderers
Sidibeh 29'	Report	Rodrigues 3', 90+4' (pen.); Wootton 64' (o.g.); Dalby 81'

Wembley Stadium, London
Attendance: 48,268
Referee: Josh Smith

===== EFL League Two =====
====== Final ======
25 May 2026
15:00 BST

Salford City	0–3	Notts County
	Report	Jatta 32'; Ness 45'; Jones 70'

Wembley Stadium, London
Attendance: 30,851
Referee: Tom Reeves

==== National League play-offs ====
===== National League =====
====== Final ======
10 May 2025
15:00 BST

Boreham Wood	2–2 (a.e.t.)	Rochdale
Rush 22'; Abdulmalik 69'	Report	Smith 78'; Dieseruvwe 90+7'
Penalties
Reynolds (penalty missed); Sousa (penalty scored); Rush (penalty missed); Coxe (penalty missed)	1–3	(penalty scored) Beckwith; (penalty scored) Francis; (penalty scored) Perry

Wembley Stadium, London
Attendance: 17,740
Referee: Andrew Humphries

====== North ======
9 May 2026

South Shields	0–2	Kidderminster Harriers
		Donnelly 35'; Cooper 37'

Mariners Park, South Shields
Attendance: 3,628

====== South ======
9 May 2026
15:00 BST

Hornchurch	3–2 (a.e.t.)	Torquay United
Poleon 45' (pen.); Hearn 90+3'; Ling 117'		Moore 6', 78'

Hornchurch Stadium, Upminster
Referee: Matthew Norton

== Cup competitions (Men's) ==
=== FA Cup ===
==== Final ====
16 May 2026
15:00 BST

Chelsea	0–1	Manchester City
	Report	Semenyo 72'

Wembley Stadium, London
Attendance: 83,337
Referee: Darren England (South Yorkshire)

=== EFL Cup ===
==== Final ====
22 March 2026
16:30 GMT

Arsenal	0–2	Manchester City
	Report	O'Reilly 60', 64'

Wembley Stadium, London
Attendance: 88,486
Referee: Peter Bankes (Lancashire)

=== EFL Trophy ===
==== Final ====
12 April 2026
15:00 BST

Luton Town	3–1	Stockport County
Lawrence 22'; Wells 39', 90+1'	Report	Sidibeh 11'

Wembley Stadium, London
Attendance: 49,517
Referee: Martin Coy
Assistant Referees: Marc Wilson, Joe Simpson

=== FA Trophy ===
==== Final ====
17 May 2026
16:30 BST

Southend United	0–0	Wealdstone
	Report
Penalties
Bridge (penalty scored); Gubbins (penalty scored); Kendall (penalty missed); Boyes (penalty scored); Scott-Morriss (penalty scored)	4–2	Olomola (penalty missed); Hinchy (penalty missed); Obiero (penalty scored); McAvoy (penalty scored)

Wembley Stadium, London
Attendance: 43,306
Referee: Farai Hallam (Surrey)

=== FA Vase ===
==== Final ====
17 May 2026
12:30 BST

A.F.C. Stoneham	0–0	Cockfosters
	Report
Penalties
Laycock (penalty scored); Thomson (penalty scored); Annetts (penalty scored); Sampson (penalty scored)	4–2	(penalty scored) Lutaaya; (penalty missed) Hastings; (penalty scored) Jessop; (penalty missed) Moses

Wembley Stadium, London
Referee: Elliott Bell (Liverpool FA)

=== Community Shield ===
10 August 2025
15:00 BST

Crystal Palace	2–2	Liverpool
Mateta 17' (pen.); Sarr 77'	Report	Ekitike 4'; Frimpong 21'
Penalties
Mateta (penalty scored); Eze (penalty missed); Sarr (penalty scored); Sosa (penalty missed); Devenny (penalty scored)	3–2	(penalty missed) Salah; (penalty missed) Mac Allister; (penalty scored) Gakpo; (penalty missed) Elliott; (penalty scored) Szoboszlai

Wembley Stadium, London
Attendance: 82,645
Referee: Chris Kavanagh (Manchester)

== International competitions ==
=== FIFA Club World Cup ===
==== Knockout stage ====
===== Quarter-finals =====
4 July 2025	Palmeiras (Brazilian Football Confederation)	1–2	(The Football Association) Chelsea	Philadelphia, United States
9:00 pm EDT		Report		Stadium: Lincoln Financial Field

===== Semi-finals =====
8 July 2025	Fluminense (Brazilian Football Confederation)	0–2	(The Football Association) Chelsea	East Rutherford, United States
3:00 pm EDT		Report		Stadium: MetLife Stadium

===== Final =====
July 13, 2025
3:00 pm EDT

Chelsea (The Football Association)	3–0	(French Football Federation) Paris Saint-Germain
Palmer 22', 30'; João Pedro 43'	Report

MetLife Stadium, East Rutherford
Attendance: 81,118
Referee: Alireza Faghani (Australia)

== League competitions (Women's) ==
League	Promoted to league ▲	Relegated from league ▼
Super League	London City Lionesses ▲	Crystal Palace ▼
Championship	Ipswich Town ▲; Nottingham Forest ▲	Sheffield United ▼
National League; Premier Division	Loughborough Lightning ▲; Middlesbrough ▲	Halifax ▼; Stourbridge ▼

=== Women's Super League ===
Pos	Team	Pld	W	D	L	GF	GA	GD	Pts	Qualification or relegation
1	Manchester City (C)	22	18	1	3	62	19	+43	55	Qualification for the Champions League league phase
2	Arsenal	22	15	6	1	53	14	+39	51	Qualification for the Champions League league phase
3	Chelsea	22	15	4	3	44	20	+24	49	Qualification for the Champions League third qualifying round
4	Manchester United	22	11	7	4	38	22	+16	40	
5	Tottenham Hotspur	22	11	3	8	35	38	−3	36	
6	London City Lionesses	22	8	3	11	28	35	−7	27	
7	Brighton & Hove Albion	22	7	5	10	27	28	−1	26	
8	Everton	22	7	2	13	25	37	−12	23	
9	Aston Villa	22	5	5	12	28	48	−20	20	
10	West Ham United	22	5	4	13	20	45	−25	19	
11	Liverpool	22	4	5	13	21	34	−13	17	
12	Leicester City (R)	22	2	3	17	11	52	−41	9	Consigned to relegation play-off

Source: WSL League Table
Rules for classification: 1) Points; 2) Goal difference; 3) Number of goals scored.
(C) Champions; (R) Relegated

=== Women's Championship ===
Pos	Team	Pld	W	D	L	GF	GA	GD	Pts	Qualification
1	Birmingham City (C, P)	22	14	2	6	46	24	+22	44	Promotion to the WSL (Note: Dependent on obtaining a licence.)
2	Crystal Palace (P)	22	13	5	4	44	26	+18	44	Promotion to the WSL
3	Charlton Athletic (P, O)	22	12	6	4	31	21	+10	42	Qualification for promotion play-off
4	Bristol City	22	11	4	7	47	31	+16	37	
5	Southampton	22	10	5	7	44	26	+18	35	
6	Newcastle United	22	8	9	5	32	25	+7	33	
7	Nottingham Forest	22	9	3	10	27	35	−8	30	
8	Sunderland	22	6	6	10	28	35	−7	24	
9	Ipswich Town	22	6	5	11	26	42	−16	23	
10	Durham	22	5	7	10	27	35	−8	22	
11	Sheffield United	22	4	6	12	21	43	−22	18	
12	Portsmouth (R)	22	4	2	16	23	53	−30	14	Relegation to the Women's National League South

Source: WSL 2 League Table
Rules for classification: 1) Points; 2) Goal difference; 3) Number of goals scored
(C) Champions; (O) Play-off winners; (P) Promoted; (R) Relegated

=== Women's National League ===
==== Northern Premier Division ====
Pos	Team	Pld	W	D	L	GF	GA	GD	Pts	Qualification
1	Burnley (C, P)	22	20	2	0	63	5	+58	62	Promotion to WSL 2
2	Wolverhampton Wanderers (O, P)	22	20	1	1	70	10	+60	61	Promotion play-off
3	Rugby Borough	22	12	5	5	43	27	+16	41	
4	Stoke City	22	10	3	9	36	31	+5	33	
5	Middlesbrough	22	8	7	7	29	30	−1	31	
6	West Bromwich Albion	22	9	4	9	29	31	−2	31	
7	Liverpool Feds	22	7	5	10	44	45	−1	26	
8	Derby County	22	6	4	12	18	39	−21	22	
9	Hull City	22	5	5	12	23	54	−31	20	
10	Loughborough Lightning	22	4	7	11	21	43	−22	19	
11	Halifax (R)	22	4	4	14	15	38	−23	16	Relegation to FA WNL Division One
12	Sporting Khalsa (R)	22	3	1	18	18	56	−38	10	Relegation to FA WNL Division One

Source: FA Women's National League
Rules for classification: 1) Points; 2) Goal difference; 3) Number of goals scored
(C) Champions; (O) Play-off winners; (P) Promoted; (R) Relegated

==== Southern Premier Division ====
Pos	Team	Pld	W	D	L	GF	GA	GD	Pts	Qualification
1	Watford (C, P)	22	17	2	3	80	24	+56	53	Promotion to WSL 2
2	Plymouth Argyle	22	16	4	2	61	11	+50	52	Promotion play-off
3	AFC Bournemouth	22	14	4	4	61	20	+41	46	
4	Oxford United	22	12	3	7	44	26	+18	39	
5	Lewes	22	12	1	9	46	27	+19	37	
6	Real Bedford	22	9	3	10	41	34	+7	30	
7	Exeter City	22	9	3	10	41	35	+6	30	
8	Cheltenham Town	22	7	3	12	31	46	−15	24	
9	Hashtag United	22	6	5	11	34	38	−4	23	
10	AFC Wimbledon	22	6	4	12	30	48	−18	22	
11	Gwalia United (R)	22	6	4	12	28	46	−18	22	Relegation to FA WNL Division One
12	Billericay Town (R)	22	0	0	22	5	147	−142	0	Relegation to FA WNL Division One

Source: FA Women's National League
Rules for classification: 1) Points; 2) Goal difference; 3) Number of goals scored
(C) Champions; (P) Promoted; (R) Relegated

==== Division One North ====
Pos	Team	Pld	W	D	L	GF	GA	GD	Pts	Qualification
1	Huddersfield Town (C, P)	22	17	2	3	59	11	+48	51 (Note: Huddersfield Town were deducted two points for fielding an ineligible player. They were also fined £200.)	Promotion to Premier Division
2	Cheadle Town Stingers	22	15	4	3	36	12	+24	49	Promotion play-off
3	Leeds United	22	13	6	3	49	19	+30	45	
4	Wythenshawe	22	14	1	7	46	29	+17	43	
5	Durham Cestria	22	12	3	7	42	30	+12	39	
6	Norton & Stockton Ancients	22	10	5	7	35	33	+2	35	
7	Stockport County	22	9	4	9	44	31	+13	31	
8	Chorley	22	8	6	8	32	36	−4	30	
9	Chester-le-Street Town	22	4	4	14	26	40	−14	16	
10	York City	22	4	3	15	17	65	−48	15	
11	Doncaster Rovers Belles (R)	22	3	2	17	17	44	−27	11	Relegation to regional leagues
12	Blackburn Rovers (R)	22	2	2	18	18	71	−53	8	Relegation to regional leagues

Source: The Football Association
Rules for classification: 1) Points; 2) Goal difference; 3) Number of goals scored
(C) Champions; (P) Promoted; (R) Relegated

==== Division One Midlands ====
Pos	Team	Pld	W	D	L	GF	GA	GD	Pts	Qualification
1	Peterborough United (C, P)	22	20	2	0	87	12	+75	62	Promotion to Premier Division
2	Boldmere St. Michaels (O, P)	22	18	0	4	63	24	+39	54	Promotion play-off
3	Leafield Athletic	22	17	1	4	60	21	+39	52	
4	Barnsley Women's	22	13	3	6	52	25	+27	42	
5	Worcester City	22	11	2	9	43	44	−1	35	
6	Sheffield F.C.	22	10	4	8	40	28	+12	34	
7	Northampton Town	22	7	3	12	20	32	−12	24	
8	Notts County	22	6	3	13	37	38	−1	21	
9	Kidderminster Harriers	22	7	0	15	21	44	−23	21	
10	Sutton Coldfield Town	22	5	5	12	22	40	−18	20	
11	Stourbridge (R)	22	4	3	15	21	66	−45	15	Relegation to regional leagues
12	Lincoln United (R)	22	0	2	20	12	104	−92	2	Relegation to regional leagues

Source: The Football Association
Rules for classification: 1) Points; 2) Goal difference; 3) Number of goals scored
(C) Champions; (O) Play-off winners; (P) Promoted; (R) Relegated

==== Division One South East ====
Pos	Team	Pld	W	D	L	GF	GA	GD	Pts	Qualification
1	Fulham (C, P)	22	20	2	0	73	18	+55	62	Promotion to Premier Division
2	Norwich City (O, P)	22	18	1	3	71	23	+48	55	Promotion play-off
3	Chatham Town	22	14	3	5	56	20	+36	45	
4	London Bees	22	12	3	7	53	32	+21	39	
5	Actonians	22	11	2	9	32	32	0	35	
6	Queens Park Rangers	22	8	7	7	38	26	+12	31	
7	Luton Town	22	7	6	9	29	42	−13	27	
8	Milton Keynes Dons	22	7	4	11	32	50	−18	25	
9	Dulwich Hamlet	22	7	3	12	19	38	−19	24	
10	Cambridge United	22	5	3	14	29	45	−16	18	
11	AFC Sudbury (R)	22	2	4	16	29	68	−39	9 (Note: AFC Sudbury were deducted one point for failure to fulfil their fixture versus Chatham Town on 21 December 2025. As a result, the club were also charged £750, £250 of which is suspended, and the game was ordered to be replayed.)	Relegation to regional leagues
12	Chesham United (R)	22	1	2	19	14	81	−67	5	Relegation to regional leagues

Source: The Football Association
Rules for classification: 1) Points; 2) Goal difference; 3) Number of goals scored
(C) Champions; (O) Play-off winners; (P) Promoted; (R) Relegated

==== Division One South West ====
Pos	Team	Pld	W	D	L	GF	GA	GD	Pts	Qualification
1	Swindon Town (C, P)	22	20	0	2	83	13	+70	60	Promotion to Premier Division
2	Moneyfields	22	19	1	2	86	13	+73	58	Promotion play-off
3	Bridgwater United	22	14	4	4	48	22	+26	46	
4	Bristol Rovers	22	13	4	5	56	23	+33	43	
5	Maidenhead United	22	7	8	7	37	35	+2	29	
6	Abingdon United	22	8	5	9	33	46	−13	29	
7	Ascot United	22	7	6	9	28	28	0	27	
8	Marine Academy Plymouth	22	6	4	12	30	49	−19	22	
9	Keynsham Town	22	6	4	12	30	57	−27	22	
10	Bournemouth Sports	22	6	2	14	25	52	−27	20	
11	Portishead Town (R)	22	4	1	17	23	64	−41	13	Relegation to regional leagues
12	Worthing (R)	22	2	1	19	22	99	−77	7	Relegation to regional leagues

Source: The Football Association
Rules for classification: 1) Points; 2) Goal difference; 3) Number of goals scored
(C) Champions; (P) Promoted; (R) Relegated

== Cup competitions (Women's) ==
=== Women's FA Cup ===
==== Final ====
31 May 2026
15:00 BST

Brighton & Hove Albion	0–4	Manchester City
	Report	Shaw 38'; Greenwood 45+6'; Fujino 66'; Miedema 87'

Wembley Stadium, London
Attendance: 43,917
Referee: Melissa Burgin (Manchester)

=== Women's League Cup ===
==== Final ====
15 March 2026
14:15 GMT

Chelsea	2–0	Manchester United
James 19'; Beever-Jones 76'	Report

Ashton Gate, Bristol
Attendance: 21,619
Referee: Grace Lowe

== Managerial changes ==
Team	Outgoing manager	Manner of departure	Date of departure	Position in table	Incoming manager	Date of appointment
Norwich City	(England) Jack Wilshere	End of interim spell	3 May 2025	Pre-season	(England) Liam Manning	3 June 2025
West Bromwich Albion	(Scotland) James Morrison	End of interim spell	3 May 2025	Pre-season	(England) Ryan Mason	2 June 2025
Cardiff City	(Wales) Aaron Ramsey	End of interim spell	3 May 2025	Pre-season	(Republic of Ireland) Brian Barry-Murphy	16 June 2025
Huddersfield Town	(England) Jon Worthington	End of interim spell	3 May 2025	Pre-season	(England) Lee Grant	28 May 2025
Newport County	(Wales) Dafydd Williams	End of interim spell	3 May 2025	Pre-season	(Wales) David Hughes	23 May 2025
Bristol Rovers	(Spain) Iñigo Calderón	Sacked	4 May 2025	Pre-season	(England) Darrell Clarke	6 May 2025
Watford	(England) Tom Cleverley	Sacked	6 May 2025	Pre-season	(Uruguay) Paulo Pezzolano	13 May 2025
Hull City	(Spain) Rubén Sellés	Sacked	15 May 2025	Pre-season	(Bosnia and Herzegovina) Sergej Jakirović	11 June 2025
Notts County	(England) Stuart Maynard	Sacked	22 May 2025	Pre-season	(Northern Ireland) Martin Paterson	22 June 2025
Southampton	(Scotland) Simon Rusk	End of interim spell	25 May 2025	Pre-season	(Belgium) Will Still	25 May 2025
Plymouth Argyle	(Austria) Miron Muslić	Signed by FC Schalke 04	31 May 2025	Pre-season	(England) Tom Cleverley	13 June 2025
Bristol City	(England) Liam Manning	Signed by Norwich City	3 June 2025	Pre-season	(Austria) Gerhard Struber	19 June 2025
Middlesbrough	(England) Michael Carrick	Sacked	4 June 2025	Pre-season	(Wales) Rob Edwards	24 June 2025
Tottenham Hotspur	(Australia) Ange Postecoglou	Sacked	6 June 2025	Pre-season	(Denmark) Thomas Frank	12 June 2025
Brentford	(Denmark) Thomas Frank	Signed by Tottenham Hotspur	12 June 2025	Pre-season	(Republic of Ireland) Keith Andrews	27 June 2025
Sheffield United	(England) Chris Wilder	Mutual consent	18 June 2025	Pre-season	(Spain) Rubén Sellés	18 June 2025
Queens Park Rangers	(Spain) Martí Cifuentes	Mutual consent	24 June 2025	Pre-season	(France) Julien Stéphan	25 June 2025
Leicester City	(Netherlands) Ruud van Nistelrooy	Mutual consent	27 June 2025	Pre-season	(Spain) Martí Cifuentes	15 July 2025
Sheffield Wednesday	(Germany) Danny Röhl	Mutual consent	29 July 2025	Pre-season	(Denmark) Henrik Pedersen	31 July 2025
Nottingham Forest	(Portugal) Nuno Espírito Santo	Sacked	8 September 2025	10th	(Australia) Ange Postecoglou	9 September 2025
Sheffield United	(Spain) Rubén Sellés	Sacked	14 September 2025	24th	(England) Chris Wilder	15 September 2025
Wycombe Wanderers	(England) Mike Dodds	Sacked	18 September 2025	19th	(Northern Ireland) Michael Duff	18 September 2025
Cheltenham Town	(Wales) Michael Flynn	Sacked	20 September 2025	24th	(England) Steve Cotterill	30 September 2025
West Ham United	(England) Graham Potter	Sacked	27 September 2025	19th	(Portugal) Nuno Espírito Santo	27 September 2025
Blackpool	(England) Steve Bruce	Sacked	4 October 2025	23rd	(England) Ian Evatt	21 October 2025
Luton Town	(England) Matt Bloomfield	Sacked	6 October 2025	11th	(England) Jack Wilshere	13 October 2025
Watford	(Uruguayan Football Association) Paulo Pezzolano	Sacked	8 October 2025	11th	(Spain) Javi Gracia	8 October 2025
Nottingham Forest	(Australia) Ange Postecoglou	Sacked	18 October 2025	17th	(England) Sean Dyche	21 October 2025
Peterborough United	(Scotland) Darren Ferguson	Sacked	25 October 2025	24th	(England) Luke Williams	29 October 2025
Reading	(Republic of Ireland) Noel Hunt	Sacked	26 October 2025	19th	(England) Leam Richardson	28 October 2025
Wolverhampton Wanderers	(Portugal) Vítor Pereira	Sacked	2 November 2025	20th	(Wales) Rob Edwards	12 November 2025
Southampton	(Belgium) Will Still	Sacked	2 November 2025	21st	(Germany) Tonda Eckert (Note: Eckert was initially named interim manager before being appointed on a permanent basis on 5 December 2025.)	12 November 2025
Norwich City	(England) Liam Manning	Sacked	8 November 2025	23rd	(Belgium) Philippe Clement	18 November 2025
Swansea City	(Republic of Ireland) Alan Sheehan	Sacked	11 November 2025	18th	(Portugal) Vítor Matos	24 November 2025
Middlesbrough	(Wales) Rob Edwards	Signed by Wolverhampton Wanderers	12 November 2025	2nd	(Sweden) Kim Hellberg	24 November 2025
Newport County	(Wales) David Hughes	Sacked	15 November 2025	24th	(Austria) Christian Fuchs	20 November 2025
Barrow	(England) Andy Whing	Sacked	10 December 2025	18th	(Scotland) Paul Gallagher	2 January 2026
Bristol Rovers	(England) Darrell Clarke	Sacked	13 December 2025	23rd	(Scotland) Steve Evans	16 December 2025
Oxford United	(England) Gary Rowett	Sacked	23 December 2025	22nd	(England) Matt Bloomfield	9 January 2026
Port Vale	(Jamaica) Darren Moore	Sacked	28 December 2025	24th	(Australia) Jon Brady	6 January 2026
Chelsea	(Italy) Enzo Maresca	Mutual consent	1 January 2026	5th	(England) Liam Rosenior	6 January 2026
Manchester United	(Portugal) Ruben Amorim	Sacked	5 January 2026	6th	(England) Michael Carrick	13 January 2026
West Bromwich Albion	(England) Ryan Mason	Sacked	6 January 2026	18th	(Wales) Eric Ramsay	11 January 2026
Huddersfield Town	(England) Lee Grant	Sacked	17 January 2026	6th	(England) Liam Manning	20 January 2026
Fleetwood Town	(England) Pete Wild	Sacked	25 January 2026	15th	(England) Matt Lawlor (Note: Lawlor was initially named interim manager before being appointed on a permanent basis on 17 March 2025.)	26 January 2026
Leicester City	(Spain) Martí Cifuentes	Sacked	25 January 2026	14th	(England) Gary Rowett	18 February 2026
Shrewsbury Town	(England) Michael Appleton	Mutual consent	28 January 2026	21st	(England) Gavin Cowan	29 January 2026
Watford	(Spain) Javi Gracia	Resigned	1 February 2026	10th	(Belgium) Edward Still	9 February 2026
Blackburn Rovers	(France) Valérien Ismaël	Mutual consent	2 February 2026	22nd	(Northern Ireland) Michael O'Neill	13 February 2026
Wigan Athletic	(England) Ryan Lowe	Sacked	7 February 2026	22nd	(Scotland) Gary Caldwell	16 February 2026
Tottenham Hotspur	(Denmark) Thomas Frank	Sacked	11 February 2026	16th	(Croatia) Igor Tudor	14 February 2026
Barrow	(Scotland) Paul Gallagher	Sacked	11 February 2026	22nd	(Tunisia) Dino Maamria	11 February 2026
Nottingham Forest	(England) Sean Dyche	Sacked	12 February 2026	17th	(Portugal) Vítor Pereira	15 February 2026
Exeter City	(Scotland) Gary Caldwell	Signed by Wigan Athletic	16 February 2026	14th	(England) Matt Taylor	3 March 2026
West Bromwich Albion	(Wales) Eric Ramsay	Sacked	25 February 2026	21st	(Scotland) James Morrison (Note: Morrison was initially named interim manager before being appointed on a permanent basis on 30 April 2026.)	25 February 2026
Tranmere Rovers	(England) Andy Crosby	Sacked	4 March 2026	19th	(England) Pete Wild (interim)	10 March 2026
Northampton Town	(England) Kevin Nolan	Sacked	9 March 2026	23rd	(Scotland) Colin Calderwood (interim)	9 March 2026
Walsall	(England) Mat Sadler	Sacked	11 March 2026	11th	(Jamaica) Darren Byfield (interim)	11 March 2026
Barrow	(Tunisia) Dino Maamria	Sacked	11 March 2026	22nd	(Republic of Ireland) Sam Foley (interim)	11 March 2026
Rotherham United	(England) Matt Hamshaw	Sacked	18 March 2026	22nd	(England) Lee Clark	18 March 2026
Crawley Town	(England) Scott Lindsey	Sacked	22 March 2026	21st	(Turkey) Colin Kazim-Richards	24 March 2026
Bristol City	(Austria) Gerhard Struber	Sacked	27 March 2026	16th	(England) Roy Hodgson (interim)	27 March 2026
Tottenham Hotspur	(Croatia) Igor Tudor	Mutual consent	29 March 2026	17th	(Italy) Roberto De Zerbi	31 March 2026
Chelsea	(England) Liam Rosenior	Sacked	22 April 2026	7th	(England) Calum McFarlane (interim)	22 April 2026
Burnley	(England) Scott Parker	Mutual consent	30 April 2026	19th	(England) Mike Jackson (interim)	30 April 2026

== Deaths ==
- 5 June 2025: Eddie Loyden, 79, Blackpool, Chester, Shrewsbury Town, Barnsley and Tranmere Rovers forward.
- 7 June 2025: Uriah Rennie, 65, referee.
- 10 June 2025: Bill McKinney, 88, Newcastle United, Bournemouth & Boscombe Athletic and Mansfield Town defender.
- 13 June 2025: Barney Daniels, 74, Manchester City, Chester and Stockport County forward.
- 16 June 2025: Dick Edwards, 82, Aston Villa, Mansfield Town, Torquay United and Notts County defender.
- c.16 June 2025: Mike Kear, 82, Newport County, Nottingham Forest, Middlesbrough and Barnsley defender.
- 21 June 2025: Dudley Lewis, 62, Wales, Swansea City, Huddersfield Town, Wrexham, Halifax Town and Torquay United defender.
- 27 June 2025: Graham Cunliffe, 89, Bolton Wanderers and Rochdale wing half.
- 27 June 2025: Terry Miles, 88, Port Vale midfielder.
- 29 June 2025: Alan Peacock, 87, England, Middlesbrough, Leeds United and Plymouth Argyle forward.
- 3 July 2025: Diogo Jota, 28, Portugal, Wolverhampton Wanderers and Liverpool forward.
- 4 July 2025: Gordon Jago MBE, 92, Charlton Athletic defender, who also managed Queens Park Rangers and Millwall.
- 6 July 2025: Graham Ricketts, 85, Bristol Rovers, Stockport County, Doncaster Rovers and Peterborough United wing half.
- 11 July 2025: Billy Wilson, 88, Burnley wing half.
- 17 July 2025: Wyn Davies, 83, Wales, Wrexham, Bolton Wanderers, Newcastle United, Manchester City, Manchester United, Blackpool, Stockport County and Crewe Alexandra forward.
- 21 July 2025: Kirk Corbin, 70, Cambridge United defender.
- 22 July 2025: Joey Jones, 70, Wales, Wrexham, Liverpool, Chelsea and Huddersfield Town defender.
- c. 23 July 2025: Brian Owen, 80, Watford, Colchester United and Wolverhampton Wanderers midfielder.
- 26 July 2025: Willie Irvine, 82, Northern Ireland, Burnley, Preston North End, Brighton & Hove Albion and Halifax Town forward.
- 29 July 2025: Mark Lazarus, 86, Leyton Orient, Queens Park Rangers, Wolverhampton Wanderers, Brentford and Crystal Palace midfielder.
- 30 July 2025: Alan Finney, 91, Sheffield Wednesday and Doncaster Rovers midfielder.
- 1 August 2025: Rod Thornhill, 83, Reading defender.
- 5 August 2025: Jorge Costa, 53, Portugal and Charlton Athletic defender.
- 8 August 2025: Terry Hennessey, 82, Wales, Birmingham City, Nottingham Forest and Derby County defender.
- 9 August 2025: Bunny Larkin, 89, Birmingham City, Norwich City, Doncaster Rovers, Watford and Lincoln City inside forward/wing half.
- 13 August 2025: Kevin Dawtry, 67, Southampton and AFC Bournemouth midfielder.
- c. 25 August 2025: Ron Harbertson, 95, Bradford City, Grimsby Town, Darlington, Lincoln City and Wrexham forward.
- c. 25 August 2025: Paul Johnson, 69, Stoke City and Chester midfielder.
- 29 August 2025: Steve Thompson, 70, Lincoln City, Charlton Athletic and Sheffield United defender, who also managed Lincoln City, Southend United, Sheffield United, Cambridge United and Notts County.
- 30 August 2025: Bud Brocken, 67, Netherlands and Birmingham City midfielder.
- 31 August 2025: Johnny Vilstrup, 58, Luton Town midfielder.
- 1 September 2025: Jimmy Bone, 75, Scotland, Norwich City and Sheffield United forward.
- 3 September 2025: Bobby Graham, 80, Liverpool and Coventry City forward.
- 3 September 2025: Barrie Thomas, 88, Leicester City, Mansfield Town, Scunthorpe United, Newcastle United and Barnsley forward.
- 10 September 2025: Mark Hine, 61, Grimsby Town, Darlington, Peterborough United, Scunthorpe United and Doncaster Rovers midfielder.
- 10 September 2025: Roy Parnell, 81, Everton, Tranmere Rovers and Bury defender.
- 13 September 2025: George Sievwright, 88, Oldham Athletic and Rochdale wing half.
- 20 September 2025: Matt Beard, 47, Liverpool Women's manager
- 25 September 2025: Billy Vigar, 21, non-league forward for Chichester City, who died after injuries sustained whilst playing for the club a few days earlier.
- 26 September 2025: Ken Houghton, 85, Rotherham United, Hull City and Scunthorpe United forward, who also managed Hull City.
- 4 October 2025: Willie McFaul, 82, Northern Ireland and Newcastle United goalkeeper, who also managed Newcastle United.
- 7 October 2025: Alan Hawley, 79, Brentford defender.
- 9 October 2025: Jimmy Nicholson, 82, Northern Ireland, Manchester United, Huddersfield Town and Bury midfielder.
- c. 23 October 2025: Mick McNeil, 85, England, Middlesbrough and Ipswich Town defender.
- c. 24 October 2025: Colin Longden, 92, Rotherham United and York City midfielder.
- 24 October 2025: Bob Wilson, 91, Norwich City, Gillingham and Chester City wing half.
- 27 October 2025: Marvin Brown, 42, Bristol City and Yeovil Town forward.
- c. 31 October 2025: Colin Addison, 85, York City, Nottingham Forest, Arsenal, Sheffield United and Hereford United forward, who also managed Hereford United, Newport County, Derby County and Swansea City.
- 31 October 2025: Willie Young, 73, Tottenham Hotspur, Arsenal, Nottingham Forest, Norwich City, Brighton & Hove Albion and Darlington defender.
- 4 November 2025: Stuart Boam, 77, Mansfield Town, Middlesbrough, Newcastle United and Hartlepool United defender, who also managed Mansfield Town.
- 5 November 2025: Bernard Hall, 83, Bristol Rovers goalkeeper.
- 17 November 2025: Rod Thomas, 78, Wales, Swindon Town, Derby County, Cardiff City and Newport County defender.
- 20 November 2025: Colin Nelson, 87, Sunderland and Mansfield Town defender.
- 25 November 2025: Colin Brookes, 83, Barnsley and Southport midfielder.
- c. 25 November 2025: Johnny Newman, 91, Birmingham City, Leicester City, Plymouth Argyle and Exeter City defender, who also managed Exeter City, Grimsby Town, Derby County and Hereford United.
- 26 November 2025: Tommy Murray, 82, Carlisle United midfielder/forward.
- 26 November 2025: Les O'Neill, 81, Newcastle United, Darlington, Bradford City and Carlisle United midfielder.
- 28 November 2025: Ken Price, 71, Southend United, Gillingham and Reading forward.
- 30 November 2025: Billy Bonds MBE , 79, Charlton Athletic and West Ham United defender/midfielder, who also managed West Ham United and Millwall. Current record holder for most appearances at West Ham.
- 2 December 2025: Marvin Hinton, 85, Charlton Athletic and Chelsea defender.
- 9 December 2025: David Best, 82, AFC Bournemouth, Oldham Athletic, Ipswich Town and Portsmouth goalkeeper.
- 9 December 2025: Dixie Deans, 79, Scotland and Luton Town forward.
- 11 December 2025: Stan Brookes, 72, Doncaster Rovers defender.
- 13 December 2025: Gary Rowell, 68, Sunderland, Norwich City, Middlesbrough, Brighton & Hove Albion, Carlisle United and Burnley forward/midfielder.
- c. 18 December 2025: Chris Ogden, 72, Oldham Athletic, Swindon Town and Rotherham United goalkeeper.
- 18 December 2025: Åge Hareide, 72, Norway, Manchester City and Norwich City defender.
- 20 December 2025: Steve Ford, 66, Stoke City forward.
- 20 December 2025: Keith Mottershead, 81, Doncaster Rovers midfielder.
- 22 December 2025: Robin Turner, 70, Ipswich Town, Swansea City and Colchester United forward.
- 23 December 2025: Allan Gilliver, 81, Huddersfield Town, Blackburn Rovers, Rotherham United, Brighton & Hove Albion, Lincoln City, Bradford City and Stockport County forward.
- 25 December 2025: John Robertson, 72, Scotland, Nottingham Forest and Derby County midfielder.
- 29 December 2025: Gordon Jones, 82, Middlesbrough and Darlington defender.
- 31 December 2025: Eric Redrobe, 81, Bolton Wanderers, Southport and Hereford United forward.
- 1 January 2026: Alan Baker, 81, Aston Villa and Walsall forward.
- 1 January 2026: Colin McDonald, 95, England and Burnley goalkeeper.
- 3 January 2026: John Meredith, 85, Doncaster Rovers, Sheffield Wednesday, Chesterfield, Gillingham and Bournemouth & Boscombe Athletic midfielder.
- 3 January 2026: Terry Wharton, 83, Wolverhampton Wanderers, Bolton Wanderers, Crystal Palace and Walsall midfielder.
- 7 January 2026: Martin Chivers, 80, England, Southampton, Tottenham Hotspur, Norwich City and Brighton & Hove Albion forward.
- 7 January 2026: Tony Field, 79, Halifax Town, Barrow, Southport, Blackburn Rovers and Sheffield United forward.
- 8 January 2026: Howard Riley, 87, Leicester City, Walsall and Barrow midfielder.
- 8 January 2026: Terry Yorath, 75, Wales, Leeds United, Coventry City, Tottenham Hotspur, Bradford City and Swansea City midfielder, who also managed Swansea City, Wales, Bradford City, Cardiff City and Sheffield Wednesday.
- 11 January 2026: Robert Hopkins, 64, Aston Villa, Birmingham City, Manchester City, West Bromwich Albion, Shrewsbury Town and Colchester United midfielder.
- 12 January 2026: Eddie McCreadie, 85, Scotland and Chelsea defender, who also managed Chelsea.
- 18 January 2026: David Young, 80, Newcastle United, Sunderland, Charlton Athletic and Southend United defender.
- 20 January 2026: Ian Macowat, 60, Gillingham and Crewe Alexandra defender.
- 20 January 2026: Tommy Wright, 81, England and Everton defender.
- c. 22 January 2026: Joe Gadston, 80, Bristol Rovers, Exeter City and Aldershot forward.
- c. 2 February 2026: Gerry Carver, 90, Notts County midfielder.
- 13 February 2026: Brian Westlake, 82, Doncaster Rovers, Halifax Town, Tranmere Rovers and Colchester United forward.
- c. 17 February 2026: Roy Ellam, 83, Bradford City, Huddersfield Town and Leeds United defender.
- 26 February 2026: Lynda Hale, 72, England Lionesses and Southampton midfielder, credited as an early pioneer of women's football in the UK.
- 26 February 2026: Stuart Pilling, 74, Scunthorpe United defender/midfielder.
- 27 February 2026: Arthur Barnard, 93, Bolton Wanderers, Southport and Stockport County goalkeeper.
- 27 February 2026: John Markie, 81, Newcastle United defender.
- c. 9 March 2026: Graham Sissons, 91, Birmingham City, Peterborough United and Walsall defender.
- 9 March 2026: Phil Summerill, 78, Birmingham City, Huddersfield Town, Millwall and Wimbledon forward.
- c. 13 March 2026: Billy Campbell, 81, Sunderland midfielder.
- 13 March 2026: Amy Carr, 34, Reading Women goalkeeper.
- 13 March 2026: Billy McCullough, 90, Northern Ireland, Arsenal and Millwall defender.
- 13 March 2026: Ron Roberts, 83, Wrexham and Tranmere Rovers midfielder.
- 15 March 2026: Jim Fleeting, 70, Norwich City defender.
- 16 March 2026: Derek Bellotti, 79, Gillingham, Charlton Athletic, Southend United and Swansea City goalkeeper.
- 25 March 2026: Geoff Vowden, 84, Nottingham Forest, Birmingham City and Aston Villa forward.
- 27 March 2026: Alex Cropley, 75, Scotland, Arsenal, Aston Villa, Portsmouth midfielder.
- 30 March 2026: Tony Godden, 70, West Bromwich Albion, Chelsea and Birmingham City goalkeeper.
- 30 March 2026: Willie Watson, 76, Manchester United defender.
- 31 March 2026: Borislav Mihaylov, 63, Bulgaria and Reading goalkeeper.
- 8 April 2026: Brian Garvey, 88, Hull City, Watford and Colchester United defender.
- 11 April 2026: Paul Berry, 68, Oxford United midfielder.
- 12 April 2026: Laurie Abrahams, 72, Charlton Athletic forward.
- c. 13 April 2026: Nicky Smith, 57, Southend United, Colchester United and Northampton Town midfielder.
- 14 April 2026: Henry Newton, 82, Nottingham Forest, Everton, Derby County and Walsall midfielder.
- 16 April 2026: Alex Manninger, 48, Austria and Arsenal goalkeeper.
- 18 April 2026: Gordon Livsey, 79, Wrexham, Chester and Hartlepool United goalkeeper.
- 22 April 2026: Tony Parkes, 76, Blackburn Rovers midfielder, who served the club in a number of coaching roles as well as six stints as caretaker manager.
- 23 April 2026: George Ley, 80, Exeter City, Portsmouth, Brighton & Hove Albion and Gillingham defender/midfielder.
- 24 April 2026: Quintin Young, 78, Coventry City midfielder.
- 25 April 2026: Terry Wollen, 82, Swindon Town defender.
- 13 May 2026: Peter Simpson, 81, Arsenal defender.
- 15 May 2026: Jimmy Mann, 73, Leeds United, Bristol City, Barnsley, Scunthorpe United and Doncaster Rovers midfielder.
- 18 May 2026: Jim Irvine, 85, Middlesbrough and Barrow forward.
- 19 May 2026: John Middleton, 70, Bradford City defender.
- 20 May 2026: Mike Galloway, 60, Scotland, Mansfield Town and Halifax Town defender/midfielder.
- 21 May 2026: Bill Albury, 92, Portsmouth and Gillingham wing half.
- c. 24 May 2026: Trevor Meath, 82, Walsall and Lincoln City midfielder.

== Retirements ==
- 4 June 2025: Jefferson Louis, 46, former Dominica, Oxford United, Bristol Rovers and Mansfield Town forward.
- 17 June 2025: Alex Kenyon, 32, former Morecambe and Scunthorpe United midfielder.
- 18 June 2025: Mike Jones, 37, former Tranmere Rovers, Bury, Sheffield Wednesday, Crawley Town, Oldham Athletic, Carlisle United and Barrow midfielder.
- 19 June 2025: Danny Hylton, 36, former Aldershot Town, Rotherham United, Bury, AFC Wimbledon, Oxford United, Luton Town, Northampton Town and Charlton Athletic forward.
- 25 June 2025: Adam Lallana, 37, former England, Southampton, Liverpool and Brighton & Hove Albion midfielder.
- 30 June 2025: Charly Musonda, 28, former Chelsea midfielder.
- 3 July 2025: Darren Pratley, 40, former Fulham, Swansea City, Bolton Wanderers, Charlton Athletic and Leyton Orient midfielder.
- 3 July 2025: Sam Wedgbury, 36, former Macclesfield Town and Stevenage midfielder.
- 4 July 2025: Robert Hall, 31, former West Ham United, Oxford United, Milton Keynes Dons, Birmingham City, Bolton Wanderers and Forest Green Rovers midfielder.
- 16 July 2025: Colin Doyle, 40, former Republic of Ireland, Birmingham City, Blackpool and Bradford City goalkeeper.
- 16 July 2025: Wayne Hennessey, 38, former Wales, Wolverhampton Wanderers, Crystal Palace, Burnley and Nottingham Forest goalkeeper.
- 8 August 2025: Kyle Bartley, 34, former Sheffield United, Swansea City, Birmingham City, Leeds United and West Bromwich Albion defender.
- 12 August 2025: Dedryck Boyata, 34, former Belgium, Manchester City and Bolton Wanderers defender.
- 14 August 2025: Erik Lamela, 33, former Argentina and Tottenham Hotspur midfielder.
- 20 August 2025: Andy Lonergan, 41, Preston North End, Leeds United, Bolton Wanderers, Fulham, Wolverhampton Wanderers, Middlesbrough and Stoke City goalkeeper.
- 21 August 2025: Gary Madine, 34, former Carlisle United, Sheffield Wednesday, Bolton Wanderers, Cardiff City and Blackpool forward.
- 28 August 2025: Corry Evans, 35, former Northern Ireland, Hull City, Blackburn Rovers, Sunderland and Bradford City midfielder.
- 3 September 2025: Jordan Rhodes, 35, former Scotland, Ipswich Town, Huddersfield Town, Blackburn Rovers, Middlesbrough, Sheffield Wednesday and Blackpool forward.
- 9 September 2025: Greg Halford, 40, former Colchester United, Reading, Sunderland, Charlton Athletic, Sheffield United, Wolverhampton Wanderers, Portsmouth, Nottingham Forest, Brighton & Hove Albion, Rotherham United, Birmingham City, Cardiff City and Southend United defender.
- 12 September 2025: Lee Gregory, 37, former Millwall, Stoke City, Derby County, Sheffield Wednesday and Mansfield Town forward.
- 23 September 2025: Tim Krul, 37, former Netherlands, Newcastle United, Brighton & Hove Albion, Norwich City and Luton Town goalkeeper.
- 29 September 2025: Steven Fletcher, 38, former Scotland, Burnley, Wolverhampton Wanderers, Sunderland, Sheffield Wednesday, Stoke City and Wrexham forward.
- 4 October 2025: Andy Boyle, 34, former Republic of Ireland, Preston North End and Doncaster Rovers defender.
- 10 October 2025: Martin Kelly, 35, former England, Liverpool, Crystal Palace and West Bromwich Albion defender.
- 18 October 2025: Brad Guzan, 41, former United States, Aston Villa, Hull City and Middlesbrough goalkeeper.
- 20 October 2025: Joe Morrell, 28, former Wales, Bristol City, Luton Town and Portsmouth midfielder.
- 23 October 2025: Scott Carson, 40, former England, Leeds United, Liverpool, West Bromwich Albion, Wigan Athletic, Derby County and Manchester City goalkeeper.
- 28 October 2025: Jed Steer, 33, former Norwich City, Aston Villa and Peterborough United goalkeeper.
- 30 October 2025: Conrad Logan, 39, former Leicester City, Boston United, Stockport County, Luton Town, Bristol Rovers, Rotherham United, Rochdale, Mansfield Town and Forest Green Rovers goalkeeper.
- 30 October 2025: Alfie Whiteman, 27, former Tottenham Hotspur goalkeeper.
- 3 November 2025: Alan Judge, 36, former Republic of Ireland, Blackburn Rovers, Notts County, Brentford, Ipswich Town and Colchester United midfielder.
- 4 November 2025: Mark Cousins, 38, former Colchester United and Dagenham & Redbridge goalkeeper.
- 7 November 2025: Paul Huntington, 38, former Newcastle United, Leeds United, Stockport County, Yeovil Town, Preston North End, Carlisle United and Bradford City defender.
- 19 November 2025: Dior Angus, 31, former Port Vale, Barrow and Harrogate Town forward.
- 20 November 2025: Fernandinho, 40, former Brazil and Manchester City midfielder.
- 5 December 2025: Paul Dummett, 34, Wales, Newcastle United, Wigan Athletic and Carlisle United defender.
- 15 December 2025: Oscar Wallin, 24, former Peterborough United defender.
- 19 December 2025: Steven Caulker, 33, former Sierra Leone, England, Great Britain Olympic, Tottenham Hotspur, Cardiff City, Queens Park Rangers and Wigan Athletic defender.
- 12 January 2026: Mamadou Sakho, 35, former France, Liverpool and Crystal Palace defender.
- 22 January 2026: James Clarke, 36, former Bristol Rovers, Walsall and Newport County defender.
- 22 January 2026: David Worrall, 35, former Bury, Accrington Stanley, Shrewsbury Town, Rotherham United, Oldham Athletic, Southend United, Millwall, Port Vale and Barrow midfielder.
- 26 January 2026: Harry Pell, 34, former Bristol Rovers, Hereford United, AFC Wimbledon, Cheltenham Town, Colchester United and Accrington Stanley midfielder.
- 28 January 2026: Greg Cunningham, 34, former Republic of Ireland, Manchester City, Bristol City, Preston North End and Cardiff City defender.
- 31 January 2026: Ronnie Henry, 42, former Southend United and Stevenage defender.
- 5 February 2026: Marco van Ginkel, 33, former Netherlands, Chelsea and Stoke City midfielder.
- 7 February 2026: Ben Richards-Everton, 34, former Accrington Stanley and Bradford City defender.
- 25 February 2026: Ash Taylor, 35, former Tranmere Rovers, Northampton Town, Walsall and Bradford City defender.
- 27 February 2026: Mark Little, 37, former Wolverhampton Wanderers, Peterborough United, Bristol City, Bolton Wanderers and Bristol Rovers defender.
- 28 February 2026: Florian Jozefzoon, 35, former Suriname, Brentford and Derby County midfielder.
- 9 March 2026: Jack Colback, 36, former Sunderland, Newcastle United, Nottingham Forest and Queens Park Rangers midfielder.
- 12 March 2026: Tyrone Williams, 31, former Chesterfield defender.
- 16 March 2026: Sergio Romero, 39, former Argentina and Manchester United goalkeeper.
- 22 March 2026: Dimitri Payet, 38, former France and West Ham United midfielder.
- 23 March 2026: Callum Johnson, 29, former Accrington Stanley, Portsmouth, Mansfield Town and Bradford City defender.
- 7 April 2026: Aaron Ramsey, 35, former Wales, Great Britain Olympic, Cardiff City and Arsenal midfielder.
- 7 April 2026: Barry Douglas, 36, former Scotland, Wolverhampton Wanderers and Leeds United defender.
- 13 April 2026: Tony Craig, 40, former Millwall, Crystal Palace, Brentford, Bristol Rovers and Crawley Town defender.
- 15 April 2026: Jonjo Shelvey, 34, former England, Charlton Athletic, Liverpool, Swansea City, Newcastle United, Nottingham Forest and Burnley midfielder.
- 24 April 2026: Adam Chicksen, 34, former Zimbabwe, Milton Keynes Dons, Leyton Orient, Brighton & Hove Albion, Gillingham, Fleetwood Town, Charlton Athletic, Bradford City, Bolton Wanderers and Notts County defender.
- 25 April 2026: Jake Hyde, 35, former Barnet, York City and Stevenage forward.
- 30 April 2026: Ashley Young, 40, England, Watford, Aston Villa, Manchester United, Everton and Ipswich Town midfielder/defender.
- 2 May 2026: Sam Vokes, 36, Wales, A.F.C. Bournemouth, Wolverhampton Wanderers, Burnley, Stoke City, Wycombe Wanderers and Gillingham forward.
- 4 May 2026: Will Blackmore, 24, Peterborough United goalkeeper.
- 4 May 2026: Joe Murphy, 44, former Republic of Ireland, Tranmere Rovers, West Bromwich Albion, Scunthorpe United, Coventry City, Huddersfield Town, Bury and Shrewsbury Town goalkeeper.
- 6 May 2026: Ben Mee, 36, former Manchester City, Burnley, Brentford and Sheffield United defender.
- 8 May 2026, Paul Jones, 39, former Exeter City, Peterborough United, Crawley Town,Portsmouth, Norwich City and Fleetwood Town goalkeeper.
- 17 May 2026: Andy Halliday, 34, former Middlesbrough and Bradford City midfielder/defender.
- 17 May 2026: Robbie Willmott, 36, former Newport County midfielder.
- 23 May 2026: César Azpilicueta, 36, former Spain and Chelsea defender.
- 25 May 2026: Conor Sammon, 39, former Republic of Ireland, Wigan Athletic and Derby County forward.
- 27 May 2026: Kasper Schmeichel, 39, former Denmark, Manchester City, Darlington, Bury, Cardiff City, Coventry City, Notts County, Leeds United and Leicester City goalkeeper.
- 29 May 2026: Alex Fisher, 35, former Mansfield Town, Yeovil Town, Exeter City, Newport County forward.
