= John O'Rourke (footballer, born 1945) =

English footballer

Personal information
- Date of birth: 11 February 1945
- Place of birth: Northampton, England
- Date of death: 7 July 2016 (aged 71)
- Place of death: Dorset, England
- Position: Forward

Youth career
- Arsenal

Senior career*
Years	Team	Apps	(Gls)
1962–1963	Chelsea	0	(0)
1963–1966	Luton Town	84	(64)
1966–1968	Middlesbrough	64	(38)
1968–1969	Ipswich Town	69	(30)
1969–1971	Coventry City	54	(17)
1971–1974	Queens Park Rangers	34	(12)
1974–1976	AFC Bournemouth	22	(4)
1975	→ Poole Town (loan)		
1976	Rangers Johannesburg		
1976–1977	Weymouth		
1977	Poole Town		
1977–1980	Dorchester Town		
1980–1981	Poole Town		
- * Club domestic league appearances and goals

John O'Rourke (11 February 1945 – 7 July 2016) was a professional footballer. His position was centre forward.

During his career he played for Ipswich Town, Middlesbrough, Coventry City, Luton Town, Queens Park Rangers and AFC Bournemouth.

Such was his scoring success and popularity on Teesside that fans would sing "Give us a goal, John O'Rourke" to the tune of The Troggs song "Give It to Me". An £18,500 signing from Luton Town, he scored two on his debut at Colchester and went on to score 27 in 39 games as Boro clinched promotion from Division Three at the first attempt. This included a hat-trick in the crucial last match of the season, a 4–1 victory over Oxford United.

On 31 December 1966, while playing for Middlesbrough, O'Rourke was involved in a collision with Bristol Rovers goalkeeper Bernard Hall, which left Hall in a coma for sixteen days and ended his footballing career.

The following season, 1967–68, he scored two further hat-tricks before moving to Ipswich Town in February 1968 for £30,000.

-QPR initially almost signed him from Middlesbrough in 1967/68 but couldn't agree terms.

O'Rourke was signed by QPR Manager Gordon Jago in 1971 for a then record fee of 65,000 pounds from Coventry City (after a competition with Millwall to sign him)

-The following season, he scored a few, but QPR then signed Stan Bowles; O'Rourke was injured and then kept out by a forward line of Bowles, Givens and Thomas. And QPR sold him to Bournemouth for about 40,000.

When his playing days were over, O'Rourke became a newsagent on the south coast. He died on 7 July 2016, aged 71 of cancer.
