= John Middleton (footballer, born 1955) =

English footballer (1955–2026)

Personal information
- Date of birth: 11 July 1955
- Place of birth: Rawmarsh, Yorkshire, England
- Date of death: May 2026 (aged 70)
- Position: Defender

Youth career
- Bradford City

Senior career*
Years	Team	Apps	(Gls)
1972–1979	Bradford City	192	(5)
1979	Macclesfield Town	5	(0)
- * Club domestic league appearances and goals

John Middleton (11 July 1955 – May 2026) was an English footballer who played as a defender for Bradford City and Macclesfield Town. He was born in Rawmarsh, near Rotherham on 11 July 1955, and died in May 2026, aged 70.
