= Trevor Meath =

English footballer (1944–2026)

Personal information
- Full name: Trevor John Meath
- Date of birth: 20 March 1944
- Place of birth: Wednesbury, Staffordshire, England
- Date of death: May 2026 (aged 82)
- Position: Midfielder

Senior career*
Years	Team	Apps	(Gls)
- Darlaston
1964–1969	Walsall	67	(11)
1969–1972	Lincoln City	43	(5)
- * Club domestic league appearances and goals

Trevor John Meath (20 March 1944 – May 2026) was an English footballer who made 110 appearances in the Football League playing as a midfielder for Walsall and Lincoln City. Having begun his career in non-league football with Darlaston, he joined Walsall in October 1969 for a £6,000 fee. His career ended prematurely after an injury sustained in a match in October 1971. Meath died in May 2026, at the age of 82.
