= Colin Longden =

English footballer (1933–2025)

Personal information
- Full name: Colin Longden
- Date of birth: 21 July 1933
- Place of birth: Rotherham, West Riding of Yorkshire, England
- Date of death: 17 October 2025 (aged 92)
- Place of death: Bramley, Rotherham, South Yorkshire, England
- Height: 5 ft 7 in (1.70 m)
- Position: Winger

Senior career*
Years	Team	Apps	(Gls)
1950–1955	Rotherham United	3	(0)
1955–1958	York City	2	(0)
Total		5	(0)

International career
- England schools
- * Club domestic league appearances and goals

Colin Longden (21 July 1933 – 17 October 2025) was an English professional footballer who played as a winger in the Football League for Rotherham United and York City. He was capped by England schools. Longden died at Cambron House, Bramley, Rotherham, on 17 October 2025, at the age of 92.
