= Bill Albury (footballer) =

English footballer (1933–2026)

Personal information
- Full name: William Frederick Albury
- Date of birth: 10 August 1933
- Place of birth: Portsmouth, England
- Date of death: 20 May 2026 (aged 92)
- Position: Wing half

Senior career*
Years	Team	Apps	(Gls)
1956–1958	Portsmouth	23	(0)
1959–1960	Gillingham	38	(12)
1960–1967	Yeovil Town		
1967–1970	Waterlooville		
- * Club domestic league appearances and goals

William Frederick Albury (10 August 1933 – 20 May 2026) was an English professional footballer who played as a wing half. He made his debut for Portsmouth at the age of 16 in a Midweek League match against Tottenham Hotspur in September 1950 and later, while serving in the Army, he played regularly for Portsmouth Reserves. Upon discharge in 1956, Albury joined the club as a professional. He later played for Gillingham between 1958 and 1960, and in total made 61 appearances in the Football League, scoring 12 goals. He later played in the Southern League for Yeovil Town, captaining the side over seven seasons making 392 appearances and scoring 62 goals. And then in the Hampshire League for Waterlooville, where, as player-manager, he led the club to their first appearance in the first round proper of the FA Cup, against Kettering Town in 1968–69. Albury died on 20 May 2026, aged 92.
