= Graham Ricketts =

English footballer (1939–2025)

Personal information
- Full name: Graham Anthony Ricketts
- Date of birth: 30 July 1939
- Place of birth: Oxford, England
- Date of death: 6 July 2025 (aged 85)
- Place of death: Peterborough, England
- Position: Wing half

Senior career*
Years	Team	Apps	(Gls)
1956–1961	Bristol Rovers	32	(0)
1961–1964	Stockport County	119	(6)
1964–1968	Doncaster Rovers	150	(15)
1968–1970	Peterborough United	46	(1)
1970–19??	King's Lynn		
- March Town United
- Yaxley

International career
1956	England Youth	4	(0)
- * Club domestic league appearances and goals

Graham Anthony Ricketts (30 July 1939 – 6 July 2025) was an English footballer. He played as a wing half for Bristol Rovers, Stockport County, Doncaster Rovers, and Peterborough United. He was also an England Youth international.

== Club career ==
Ricketts began his career at Bristol Rovers, moving to Stockport County in 1961.

=== Doncaster Rovers ===
Ricketts was signed in July 1964 by English fourth division club Doncaster Rovers, his debut being in a 5–2 defeat at Bradford Park Avenue on 22 August 1954.

=== Peterborough United ===
Ricketts was sold for £2,500 to Peterborough United of the English third division in March 1968. His first game was against Stockport County on 9 March 1968, and his first goal was in a 1–1 draw at Shrewsbury Town a week later.

At the end of the 1969–70 season, Ricketts left to play for King's Lynn, and later played for March Town United and Yaxley.

== International career ==
Ricketts was an England youth international, playing in four matches in February and March 1956.

== Personal life and death ==
His grandson, Joe Burgess, played as a defender for Peterborough United, Histon, Fleetwood Town, Ilkeston, and Boston United. He had three daughters, five grandchildren, and one great grandchild.

Ricketts died on 6 July 2025, at the age of 85.
