= Bernard Hall (footballer) =

English footballer (1942–2025)

Personal information
- Full name: Bernard Raymond E. Hall
- Date of birth: 8 July 1942
- Place of birth: Bath, England
- Date of death: 4 November 2025 (aged 83)
- Height: 5 ft 10 in (1.78 m)
- Position: Goalkeeper

Youth career
- ?–1958: Twerton Youth Club
- 1958–1959: Bristol Rovers

Senior career*
Years	Team	Apps	(Gls)
1959–1967	Bristol Rovers	163	(0)
- * Club domestic league appearances and goals

Bernard Raymond E. Hall (8 July 1942 – 4 November 2025) was an English professional footballer who played as a goalkeeper in The Football League for Bristol Rovers.

== Career ==
Hall was born in Bath and played for Twerton Youth Club before joining Bristol Rovers as a junior in 1958. A year later, he turned professional at the age of seventeen, but it was a further three and a half years before he finally made his League debut, on 20 April 1962 against Charlton Athletic. He finally established himself as the first choice between the sticks after the then incumbent 'keeper Esmond Million received a lifetime ban from football in 1963 for accepting a bribe to throw a game against Bradford Park Avenue.

Following the Million scandal, Hall then played in Rovers' next 134 consecutive games in all competitions. In total, he played 163 League games for the Rovers having his career prematurely ended on 31 December 1966 at the age of 24. On that day, he challenged Middlesbrough forward John O'Rourke for the ball, but the pair collided so severely that it knocked Hall out and left him in a coma in Frenchay Hospital for sixteen days. Although he recovered from this incident sufficiently to live a normal life, he was unable to resume his football career. He later took on the job of groundsman of the Imperial Sports Ground in Knowle, Bristol.

== Death ==
On 4 November 2025, Hall died at the age of 83.

== Career statistics ==
Appearances and goals by club, season and competition
Club	Season	League		
Club	Season	Division	Apps	Goals
Bristol Rovers	1959–60	Division Two	0	0
Bristol Rovers	1960–61	Division Two	0	0
Bristol Rovers	1961–62	Division Two	2	0
Bristol Rovers	1962–63	Division Three	8	0
Bristol Rovers	1963–64	Division Three	46	0
Bristol Rovers	1964–65	Division Three	46	0
Bristol Rovers	1965–66	Division Three	43	0
Bristol Rovers	1966–67	Division Three	18	0
Bristol Rovers	Total		163	0

== Sources ==
- Jay, Mike; Byrne, Stephen (1994). Pirates in Profile: A Who's Who of Bristol Rovers Players. Bristol: Potten, Baber & Murray. pp. 108–109. ISBN 0-9524835-0-5.
- Gerry Prewett (14 June 2009). "Rovers Legends: Bernard Hall". Bristol Rovers Football Club. Archived from the original on 13 January 2010.
