= 2023–24 National League =

National League
- Season: 2023–24
- Dates: 5 August 2023 - 20 April 2024
- Champions: Chesterfield
- Promoted: Chesterfield; Bromley
- Relegated: Banbury United; Bishop's Stortford; Blyth Spartans; Dartford; Dover Athletic; Gloucester City; Havant & Waterlooville; Taunton Town
- Matches: 1,656
- Goals: 4,663 (2.82 per match)
- Biggest home win: Chorley 8–0 Darlington (14 November 2023)
- Biggest away win: Buxton 0–6 Warrington Town (23 January 2024) Eastleigh 0–6 Gateshead (9 September 2023)
- Highest scoring: Worthing 6–4 Dover Athletic (10 February 2024); Gloucester City 3–7 Boston United (9 March 2024)

The 2023–24 National League season, known as the Vanarama National League for sponsorship reasons, was the ninth season under the title of the National League, the twentieth season consisting of three divisions, and the forty-fifth season overall.

== National League ==
National League
- Season: 2023–24
- Champions: Chesterfield
- Promoted: Chesterfield; Bromley
- Relegated: Boreham Wood; Kidderminster Harriers; Dorking Wanderers; Oxford City
- Matches: 552
- Goals: 1,623 (2.94 per match)
- Top goalscorer: (England) Paul McCallum (31)
- Biggest home win: Gateshead 6–0 Dorking Wanderers (11 November 2023); Barnet 6–0 Boreham Wood (23 December 2023); Dagenham & Redbridge 7–1 Oxford City (10 February 2024); Barnet 6–0 Dorking Wanderers (23 March 2024); Gateshead 7–1 Hartlepool United (26 March 2024)
- Biggest away win: Eastleigh 0–6 Gateshead (9 September 2023)
- Highest scoring: Aldershot Town 3–5 Eastleigh (16 December 2023); Wealdstone 4–4 Hartlepool United (23 December 2023); Eastleigh 4–4 Dagenham & Redbridge (1 January 2024); Boreham Wood 4–4 Eastleigh (24 January 2024); Dagenham & Redbridge 7–1 Oxford City (10 February 2024); Gateshead 7–1 Hartlepool United (26 March 2024)
- Longest unbeaten run: Southend United (16)
- Highest attendance: Oldham Athletic 1–2 Kidderminster Harriers (24 February 2024) (11,881)
- Average attendance: 2,774

Twenty-four teams compete in the league – eighteen returning teams from the previous season, two teams relegated from League Two, two teams promoted from the National League North and two teams promoted from the National League South.

=== Team changes ===
To National League

Promoted from 2022–23 National League North

- AFC Fylde
- Kidderminster Harriers

Promoted from 2022–23 National League South

- Ebbsfleet United
- Oxford City

Relegated from 2022–23 League Two

- Rochdale
- Hartlepool United

From National League

Promoted to 2023–24 League Two

- Wrexham
- Notts County

Relegated to 2023–24 National League North

- Scunthorpe United

Relegated to 2023–24 National League South

- Maidstone United
- Torquay United
- Yeovil Town

=== Stadia and locations ===
Locations of the 2023–24 National League clubs (Greater London shown in more detail below)
Locations of the 2023–24 National League clubs (Greater London)

Team	Location	Stadium	Capacity
AFC Fylde	Wesham	Mill Farm	6,000
Aldershot Town	Aldershot	Recreation Ground	7,200
Altrincham	Altrincham	Moss Lane	7,700
Barnet	London (Canons Park)	The Hive Stadium	6,418
Boreham Wood	Borehamwood	Meadow Park	4,502
Bromley	London (Bromley)	Hayes Lane	5,300
Chesterfield	Chesterfield	SMH Group Stadium	10,504
Dagenham & Redbridge	London (Dagenham)	Victoria Road	6,078
Dorking Wanderers	Dorking	Meadowbank	4,200
Eastleigh	Eastleigh	Ten Acres	5,250
Ebbsfleet United	Northfleet	Stonebridge Road	4,800
Gateshead	Gateshead	Gateshead International Stadium	11,800
FC Halifax Town	Halifax	The Shay	10,400
Hartlepool United	Hartlepool	Victoria Park	7,856
Kidderminster Harriers	Kidderminster	Aggborough	6,238
Maidenhead United	Maidenhead	York Road	4,000
Oldham Athletic	Oldham	Boundary Park	13,513
Oxford City	Oxford (Marston)	RAW Charging Stadium	3,500
Rochdale	Rochdale	Spotland Stadium	10,249
Solihull Moors	Solihull	Damson Park	5,500
Southend United	Southend-on-Sea	Roots Hall	12,392
Wealdstone	London (Ruislip)	Grosvenor Vale	4,085
Woking	Woking	Kingfield Stadium	6,036
York City	York	York Community Stadium	8,500

=== Personnel and sponsoring ===
Team	Manager	Captain	Kit manufacturer	Shirt sponsor
AFC Fylde	(England) Chris Beech	(England) Alex Whitmore	(United States) New Balance	FWP Architecture
Aldershot Town	(England) Tommy Widdrington	(England) Stuart O'Keefe	(Italy) Erreà	Bridges Estate Agents
Altrincham	(England) Phil Parkinson	(Wales) James Jones	(Germany) Puma	J Davidson Ltd
Barnet	(Republic of Ireland) Dean Brennan	(Northern Ireland) Dale Gorman	(Netherlands) Stanno	TIC Health
Boreham Wood	(England) Luke Garrard	(England) Jack Payne	(Germany) Puma	Alan Swan - Wood Army
Bromley	(England) Andy Woodman	(England) Byron Webster	(Italy) Macron	LSP Renewables
Chesterfield	(England) Paul Cook	(England) Jamie Grimes	(Germany) Puma	Leengate Valves
Dagenham & Redbridge	(England) Ben Strevens	(England) Elliot Justham	(England) Admiral	West & Coe
Dorking Wanderers	(England) Marc White	(England) Barry Fuller	(Italy) Macron	Hex.com
Eastleigh	(England) Kelvin Davis	(England) Aaron Martin	(Italy) Erreà	Utilita
Ebbsfleet United	(England) Danny Searle	(England) Chris Solly	(United States) New Balance	Virtue Clean Energy
FC Halifax Town	(England) Chris Millington	(England) Sam Johnson	(Germany) Adidas	Nuie
Gateshead	(Republic of Ireland) Rob Elliot	(England) Greg Olley	(Belgium) Patrick	Gateshead Central
Hartlepool United	(England) Kevin Phillips	(England) David Ferguson	(Italy) Erreà	The Prestige Group
Kidderminster Harriers	(England) Phil Brown	(Republic of Ireland) Shane Byrne	(England) Oxen	Adam Hewitt Ltd
Maidenhead United	(England) Alan Devonshire	(England) Alan Massey	(Spain) Kelme	CALM
Oldham Athletic	(Scotland) Micky Mellon	(England) Liam Hogan	(Germany) Puma	RRG Group
Oxford City	(England) Ross Jenkins	(England) Reece Fleet	(Italy) Macron	RAW Charging
Rochdale	(Scotland) Jimmy McNulty	(England) Ethan Ebanks-Landell	(Republic of Ireland) O'Neills	Crown Oil Ltd
Solihull Moors	(England) Andy Whing	Vacant	(Germany) Adidas	Taxbuddi
Southend United	(Republic of Ireland) Kevin Maher	(England) Nathan Ralph	(Italy) Macron	Solopress
Wealdstone	(Guyana) Sam Cox	(England) Jack Cook	(Spain) Kelme	GPF Lewis
Woking	(Republic of Ireland) Michael Doyle	(England) Josh Casey	(Germany) Adidas	Boz's Fruit & Veg
York City	(England) Adam Hinshelwood	(England) Lenell John-Lewis	(Germany) Puma	Titan Wealth

=== Managerial changes ===
Team	Outgoing manager	Manner of departure	Date of vacancy	Position in table	Incoming manager	Date of appointment
Solihull Moors	(England) Neal Ardley	Mutual consent	25 June 2023	Pre-season	(England) Andy Whing	28 June 2023
Eastleigh	(England) Lee Bradbury	Sacked	26 August 2023	21st	(England) Richard Hill (Note: Hill was originally appointed interim manager before being given the role permanently on 28 September 2023)	26 August 2023
York City	(England) Michael Morton	Sacked	28 August 2023	23rd	(England) Neal Ardley	6 September 2023
Oldham Athletic	(England) David Unsworth	Sacked	17 September 2023	22nd	(England) Steve Thompson (interim)	17 September 2023
AFC Fylde	(England) Adam Murray	Sacked	9 October 2023	24th	(England) Chris Beech (Note: Beech was appointed head coach permanently on 22 December 2023 having held the role in an interim position since the departure of Murray)	8 October 2023
Oldham Athletic	(England) Steve Thompson	End of interim spell	12 October 2023	12th	(Scotland) Micky Mellon	13 October 2023
Gateshead	(England) Mike Williamson	Signed by Milton Keynes Dons	17 October 2023	6th	(Republic of Ireland) Rob Elliot	20 June 2024
Woking	(England) Darren Sarll	Sacked	13 November 2023	14th	(Republic of Ireland) Michael Doyle	17 December 2023
Hartlepool United	(England) John Askey	Sacked	30 December 2023	18th	(England) Lennie Lawrence (interim)	3 January 2024
Kidderminster Harriers	(England) Russell Penn	Sacked	7 January 2024	24th	(England) Phil Brown	10 January 2024
Wealdstone	(England) Stuart Maynard	Signed by Notts County	18 January 2024	13th	(England) David Noble	26 January 2024
Hartlepool United	(England) Lennie Lawrence	End of interim spell	20 January 2024	13th	(England) Kevin Phillips	20 January 2024
Ebbsfleet United	(Germany) Dennis Kutrieb	Sacked	29 January 2024	21st	(England) Danny Searle	13 February 2024
Eastleigh	(England) Richard Hill	Sacked	17 February 2024	15th	(England) Kelvin Davis	19 February 2024
York City	(England) Neal Ardley	Sacked	26 February 2024	20th	(England) Adam Hinshelwood	27 February 2024
Wealdstone	(England) David Noble	Sacked	7 April 2024	20th	(Guyana) Sam Cox (interim)	7 April 2024

=== National League table ===
Pos	Team	Pld	W	D	L	GF	GA	GD	Pts	Promotion, qualification or relegation
1	Chesterfield (C, P)	46	31	5	10	106	65	+41	98	Promotion to EFL League Two
2	Barnet	46	26	8	12	91	60	+31	86	Qualification for the National League play-off semi-finals
3	Bromley (O, P)	46	22	15	9	73	49	+24	81	Qualification for the National League play-off semi-finals
4	Altrincham	46	22	11	13	84	59	+25	77 (Note: While Altrincham originally qualified for the play-off quarter-finals, Gateshead's exclusion meant that Altrincham were awarded a walkover win and progressed directly the semi-finals.)	Qualification for the National League play-off semi-finals
5	Solihull Moors	46	21	13	12	71	62	+9	76	Qualification for the National League play-off quarter-finals
6	Gateshead	46	22	9	15	88	64	+24	75	(Note: Gateshead were excluded from the play-offs due to not meeting the Football League's ground ownership requirements.)
7	FC Halifax Town	46	19	14	13	58	50	+8	71	Qualification for the National League play-off quarter-finals
8	Aldershot Town	46	20	9	17	74	83	−9	69	
9	Southend United	46	21	12	13	70	45	+25	65 (Note: Southend United were deducted ten points for failing to pay debt to HMRC.)	
10	Oldham Athletic	46	15	18	13	63	60	+3	63	
11	Rochdale	46	16	14	16	69	64	+5	62	
12	Hartlepool United	46	17	9	20	70	82	−12	60	
13	Eastleigh	46	16	11	19	73	87	−14	59	
14	Maidenhead United	46	15	13	18	60	67	−7	58	
15	Dagenham & Redbridge	46	14	14	18	69	63	+6	56	
16	Wealdstone	46	15	11	20	60	72	−12	56	
17	Woking	46	15	10	21	49	55	−6	55	
18	AFC Fylde	46	15	10	21	74	82	−8	55	
19	Ebbsfleet United	46	14	12	20	59	74	−15	54	
20	York City	46	12	17	17	55	69	−14	53	
21	Boreham Wood (R)	46	12	16	18	59	73	−14	52	Relegation to National League South
22	Kidderminster Harriers (R)	46	11	13	22	40	59	−19	46	Relegation to National League North
23	Dorking Wanderers (R)	46	12	9	25	54	85	−31	45	Relegation to National League South
24	Oxford City (R)	46	8	9	29	54	94	−40	33	Relegation to National League North

Source: National League official site
Rules for classification: 1) Points; 2) Goal difference; 3) Number of goals scored; 4) Number of matches won; 5) Head-to-head results
(C) Champions; (O) Play-off winners; (P) Promoted; (R) Relegated

=== Results table ===
Home \ Away	FYL	ALD	ALT	BAR	BOR	BRO	CHE	DAG	DOR	EAS	EBB	HAL	GAT	HAR	KID	MAI	OLD	OXF	ROC	SOL	SOU	WEA	WOK	YOR
AFC Fylde	—	0–2	3–3	2–4	2–2	1–0	2–4	1–1	3–3	1–2	1–1	2–2	2–0	2–1	2–1	4–1	3–0	2–1	2–0	2–2	0–2	1–2	0–2	0–2
Aldershot Town	0–5	—	2–0	1–0	0–3	1–1	3–4	3–2	1–1	3–5	4–1	1–0	1–1	2–1	1–0	4–2	2–0	5–2	3–1	1–1	1–1	3–1	0–0	1–1
Altrincham	2–1	2–1	—	3–2	1–1	1–2	2–1	1–1	2–1	4–0	6–1	1–2	2–3	2–2	1–1	1–3	1–0	1–0	3–0	6–1	2–0	4–1	0–1	6–1
Barnet	2–1	2–1	3–0	—	6–0	1–1	0–2	2–1	6–0	2–1	3–2	0–0	0–2	3–2	4–1	3–2	1–4	3–1	2–0	1–1	1–0	1–1	2–0	2–0
Boreham Wood	4–0	1–2	0–1	0–1	—	1–1	0–2	1–4	0–3	4–4	0–0	2–0	1–1	1–0	1–1	1–0	0–0	2–1	1–1	1–2	1–1	4–0	4–2	1–1
Bromley	1–0	2–3	2–2	0–2	2–2	—	4–3	2–2	2–1	1–0	5–1	2–0	3–1	1–2	0–0	4–1	3–0	3–1	1–0	3–0	2–1	1–1	1–1	0–2
Chesterfield	4–1	4–1	2–1	4–2	3–0	2–0	—	3–1	4–3	3–2	2–2	3–2	5–0	3–2	1–3	3–2	1–1	2–0	2–2	3–2	3–0	3–2	1–0	4–0
Dagenham & Redbridge	3–1	3–3	3–1	1–0	1–3	0–1	1–2	—	2–1	4–1	1–1	0–1	2–4	0–1	0–1	4–1	0–0	7–1	1–2	1–2	0–2	0–2	2–1	1–2
Dorking Wanderers	1–3	2–1	0–0	2–3	2–1	0–2	4–1	1–3	—	0–0	1–4	1–3	1–0	3–4	0–1	0–2	0–1	0–2	1–2	1–1	2–1	3–1	1–2	2–2
Eastleigh	1–2	3–0	2–1	3–3	2–1	2–0	1–3	4–4	2–1	—	5–2	0–3	0–6	1–1	2–1	2–3	1–2	2–2	1–4	3–3	0–1	0–0	0–1	3–1
Ebbsfleet United	2–1	2–0	0–2	1–1	3–1	2–3	0–1	0–1	0–1	3–0	—	0–2	4–2	0–1	3–0	1–1	0–0	0–4	2–1	1–2	1–1	2–0	1–0	4–1
FC Halifax Town	2–2	1–2	0–0	0–2	2–1	2–0	4–2	0–0	0–1	2–3	0–0	—	0–0	2–1	2–1	2–1	2–2	1–1	2–2	1–3	1–1	1–0	2–1	1–1
Gateshead	0–4	0–1	0–2	2–1	2–2	2–1	2–1	1–0	6–0	1–1	4–1	0–2	—	7–1	3–0	3–0	2–2	4–0	1–0	2–3	1–1	2–1	1–3	1–1
Hartlepool United	3–1	2–0	3–2	1–2	3–1	1–4	0–1	1–1	0–2	3–1	2–2	1–0	2–1	—	0–1	3–1	1–3	2–1	2–3	0–2	0–0	2–1	0–2	2–1
Kidderminster Harriers	1–1	4–2	1–3	1–2	1–2	0–0	1–3	0–1	0–0	0–1	2–0	0–2	0–2	1–1	—	0–0	1–2	3–2	1–1	0–1	1–2	1–0	0–0	0–0
Maidenhead United	2–2	4–0	0–1	2–2	0–1	0–0	1–1	1–0	4–2	3–2	0–1	1–0	2–1	3–1	1–0	—	1–3	0–0	2–2	2–1	1–2	0–2	0–0	1–1
Oldham Athletic	1–3	5–1	2–2	2–0	2–1	0–0	2–2	1–1	0–0	1–1	1–4	1–2	1–2	2–0	1–2	1–1	—	4–0	1–1	0–2	1–1	2–3	0–1	2–0
Oxford City	3–0	1–2	1–2	0–2	4–0	1–3	1–2	0–0	1–2	2–5	1–0	0–2	0–4	5–2	2–2	1–4	0–0	—	0–1	1–2	0–0	1–0	3–2	1–2
Rochdale	2–0	2–1	3–0	4–2	0–0	2–2	1–2	1–2	1–1	2–0	0–1	0–1	2–2	1–1	2–0	1–0	3–4	2–2	—	1–2	2–2	3–0	2–1	0–0
Solihull Moors	2–1	0–1	0–1	2–2	2–0	1–1	2–0	1–1	3–0	1–1	3–0	1–1	1–2	2–1	0–1	1–2	2–3	3–3	2–0	—	0–3	1–0	3–0	1–0
Southend United	1–2	4–1	2–1	0–2	4–2	1–2	2–1	1–1	2–0	2–0	3–0	3–0	0–1	2–3	2–1	2–0	4–0	2–0	1–2	5–0	—	1–1	0–0	0–1
Wealdstone	3–2	3–3	0–0	3–2	1–1	0–1	1–0	0–2	4–2	0–1	2–1	2–0	2–4	4–4	1–1	0–1	1–1	3–1	3–2	0–1	1–2	—	1–0	2–1
Woking	3–0	2–3	2–3	1–0	0–1	0–1	0–2	3–2	2–0	0–1	1–1	1–2	3–2	1–1	2–1	0–0	0–1	2–0	3–2	1–1	0–2	1–1	—	1–2
York City	1–3	1–0	2–2	2–4	2–2	2–2	2–1	1–1	0–1	0–1	1–1	1–1	2–0	1–3	0–1	1–1	1–1	2–0	1–3	2–2	3–0	2–3	2–0	—

Source: National League Results Grid
Legend: Blue = home team win; Yellow = draw; Red = away team win.

=== Play-offs ===
On 21 April 2024, it was announced that Gateshead would be forced to withdraw from the play-offs after failing to meet the entry criteria for membership of the English Football League, namely failing to attain a 10-year security of tenure for the Gateshead International Stadium.

It was initially announced that as a result of Gateshead's withdrawal, Solihull Moors would receive a bye to the semi-finals. A second statement was later put out by the National League, adjusting the structure of the play-offs to be based on final league positions. This revision meant that Altrincham would automatically advance to the semi-finals to face Bromley, whilst Solihull Moors would face FC Halifax Town in the quarter-finals.

Quarter-finals
5	Solihull Moors	4
7	FC Halifax Town	2
4	Altrincham	w/o
6	~~Gateshead~~

Semi-finals
2	Barnet	0
5	Solihull Moors	4
3	Bromley	3
4	Altrincham	1

Final
5	Solihull Moors	2 (3)
3	Bromley	2 (4)

==== Quarter-finals ====
24 April 2024	Solihull Moors	4–2	FC Halifax Town	Solihull
19:00 BST	Campbell 14'; Stevens 19'; Golden 38' (o.g.); Osborne 87'	Report	Evans 45+1'; Oluwabori (yellow card) 58'; Hoti 74'; Johnson (yellow card) 89'	Stadium: Damson Park; Attendance: 1,875; Referee: Alan Dale

==== Semi-finals ====
27 April 2024	Barnet	0–4	Solihull Moors	Canons Park
17:30 BST	Cropper (yellow card) 12'; Stead (yellow card) 90+4'	Report	Clarke 6' (yellow card) 57'; Stevens 26'; Campbell 61'; Sbarra 89'	Stadium: The Hive Stadium; Attendance: 4,560; Referee: Michael Barlow

28 April 2024	Bromley	3–1	Altrincham	Bromley
16:00 BST	Cheek (yellow card) 50'; Weston 51', 60'; Arthurs 56'; Grant (yellow card) 90'	Report	Linney 31'; Banks (yellow card) 50'	Stadium: Hayes Lane; Attendance: 5,000; Referee: Ruebyn Ricardo

==== Final ====
5 May 2024
15:00 BST

Bromley	2–2 (a.e.t.)	Solihull Moors
Cheek 41', 58' (pen.)	Report	Sbarra 48'; Osborne 65'
Penalties
Cheek (penalty scored); Charles (penalty missed); Olomola (penalty scored); Arthurs (penalty scored); Webster (penalty scored)	4–3	(penalty missed) Shade; (penalty missed) Labadie; (penalty scored) Campbell; (penalty scored) Boateng; (penalty scored) Benton

Wembley Stadium, London
Attendance: 23,374
Referee: James Durkin

=== Top scorers ===
Rank	Player	Club	Goals
1	(England) Paul McCallum	Eastleigh	31
2	(Northern Ireland) Will Grigg	Chesterfield	25
2	(England) Nicke Kabamba	Barnet	25
4	(England) Emmanuel Dieseruvwe	Hartlepool United	23
5	(Northern Ireland) Chris Conn-Clarke	Altrincham	22
6	(England) Michael Cheek	Bromley	21
7	(England) Marcus Dinanga	Gateshead	19
7	(Switzerland) Lorent Tolaj	Aldershot Town	19
9	(Scotland) Harry Cardwell	Southend United	18
9	(England) Nick Haughton	AFC Fylde	18

=== Hat-tricks ===
Player	For	Against	Result	Date
(England) Stephen Wearne	Gateshead	Ebbsfleet United	4–1	19 August 2023
(England) Paul McCallum	Eastleigh	Ebbsfleet United	5–2	3 October 2023
(Sierra Leone) Daniel Kanu^{4}	Southend United	Solihull Moors	5–0	21 October 2023
(England) Billy Chadwick	Gateshead	Dorking Wanderers	6–0	11 November 2023
(England) Nicke Kabamba	Barnet	Boreham Wood	6–0	23 December 2023
(England) Sean Adarkwa	Wealdstone	Hartlepool United	4–4	23 December 2023
(England) Paul McCallum	Eastleigh	Dagenham & Redbridge	4–4	1 January 2024
(Northern Ireland) Will Grigg	Chesterfield	Gateshead	5–0	10 January 2024
(England) Josh Rees	Dagenham & Redbridge	Oxford City	7–1	10 February 2024
(England) Michael Cheek	Bromley	Chesterfield	4–3	17 February 2024
(England) Marcus Dinanga	Gateshead	Oxford City	4–0	24 February 2024
(England) Paul McCallum	Eastleigh	Solihull Moors	3–3	2 March 2024

=== Monthly awards ===
Each month the Vanarama National League announces their official Player of the Month and Manager of the Month.

Month	Manager of the Month		Player of the Month		Reference
August	(England) Andy Whing	Solihull Moors	(England) Emmanuel Dieseruvwe	Hartlepool United	
September	(England) Andy Woodman	Bromley	(England) Marcus Dinanga	Gateshead	
October	(Republic of Ireland) Kevin Maher	Southend United	(England) Ollie Banks	Chesterfield	
November	(England) Tommy Widdrington	Aldershot Town	(England) Stephen Wearne	Gateshead	
December	(England) Andy Woodman	Bromley	(England) Paul McCallum	Eastleigh	
January	(England) Paul Cook	Chesterfield	(Switzerland) Lorent Tolaj	Aldershot Town	
February	(England) Danny Searle	Ebbsfleet United	(England) Callum Whelan	Gateshead	
March	(England) Ben Strevens	Dagenham & Redbridge	(Jamaica) Dajaune Brown	Gateshead	
April	(Republic of Ireland) Dean Brennan	Barnet	(England) Sam Beckwith	Maidenhead United	

=== Annual awards ===
Award	Winner	Club
Player of the Season	(Northern Ireland) Chris Conn-Clarke	Altrincham
Manager of the Season	(England) Paul Cook	Chesterfield

National League Team of the Season

Pos.	Player	Club
GK	(England) Grant Smith	Bromley
RB	(England) Gus Scott-Morriss	Southend United
CB	(England) Danny Collinge	Barnet
CB	(England) Jamie Grimes	Chesterfield
LB	(England) Ollie Harfield	Aldershot Town
CM	(England) Tom Naylor	Chesterfield
CM	(England) Anthony Hartigan	Barnet
CM	(England) Liam Mandeville	Chesterfield
AM	(Northern Ireland) Chris Conn-Clarke	Altrincham
CF	(England) Paul McCallum	Eastleigh
CF	(Northern Ireland) Will Grigg	Chesterfield

== National League North ==
National League North
- Season: 2023–24
- Champions: Tamworth
- Promoted: Tamworth; Boston United
- Relegated: Blyth Spartans; Banbury United; Gloucester City; Bishop's Stortford
- Matches: 552
- Goals: 1,474 (2.67 per match)
- Top goalscorer: (England) Paul Blackett (29)
- Biggest home win: Chorley 8–0 Darlington (14 November 2023)
- Biggest away win: Buxton 0–6 Warrington Town (23 January 2024)
- Highest scoring: Gloucester City 3–7 Boston United (9 March 2024)
- Highest attendance: Scunthorpe United 0–0 (4-5) Boston United (27 April 2024) (8,036)
- Average attendance: 1,234

The National League North consists of 24 teams.

=== Team changes ===
To National League North

Relegated from 2022–23 National League

- Scunthorpe United

Promoted from 2022–23 Isthmian League

- Bishop's Stortford

Promoted from 2022–23 Northern Premier League

- South Shields
- Warrington Town

Promoted from 2022–23 Southern League

- Tamworth
- Rushall Olympic

From National League North

Promoted to 2023–24 National League

- AFC Fylde
- Kidderminster Harriers

Relegated to the 2023–24 Southern League

- AFC Telford United
- Kettering Town
- Leamington

Relegated to the 2023–24 Northern Premier League

- Bradford (Park Avenue)

=== Stadia and locations ===
Locations of the National League North 2023–24 teams

Team	Location	Stadium	Capacity
Alfreton Town	Alfreton	North Street	3,600
Banbury United	Banbury	Spencer Stadium	2,000
Bishop's Stortford	Bishop's Stortford	Woodside Park	4,525
Blyth Spartans	Blyth	Croft Park	4,435
Boston United	Boston	Boston Community Stadium	5,061
Brackley Town	Brackley	St. James Park	3,500
Buxton	Buxton	The Silverlands	5,200
Chester	Chester	Deva Stadium	6,500
Chorley	Chorley	Victory Park	4,100
Curzon Ashton	Ashton-under-Lyne	Tameside Stadium	4,000
Darlington	Darlington	Blackwell Meadows	3,300
Farsley Celtic	Farsley	The Citadel	3,900
Gloucester City	Gloucester	Meadow Park	3,600
Hereford	Hereford	Edgar Street	5,250
King's Lynn Town	King's Lynn	The Walks	8,200
Peterborough Sports	Peterborough	Lincoln Road	2,300
Rushall Olympic	Walsall (Rushall)	Dales Lane	2,000
Scarborough Athletic	Scarborough	Flamingo Land Stadium	2,833
Scunthorpe United	Scunthorpe	Glanford Park	9,088
South Shields	South Shields	1st Cloud Arena	3,500
Southport	Southport	Haig Avenue	6,008
Spennymoor Town	Spennymoor	The Brewery Field	4,300
Tamworth	Tamworth	The Lamb Ground	4,565
Warrington Town	Warrington	Cantilever Park	3,500

=== Managerial changes ===
Team	Outgoing manager	Manner of departure	Date of vacancy	Position in table	Incoming manager	Date of appointment
South Shields	(England) Kevin Phillips	Mutual consent	22 April 2023	Pre-season	(Argentina) Julio Arca	27 April 2023
Hereford	(England) Yan Klukowski	End of interim spell	29 April 2023	Pre-season	(Scotland) Paul Caddis	1 May 2023
Spennymoor Town	(England) Jason Ainsley	End of interim spell	29 April 2023	Pre-season	(England) Jamie Chandler	18 May 2023
Gloucester City	(England) Steve King	Resigned	9 May 2023	Pre-season	(England) Tim Flowers	19 May 2023
Brackley Town	(England) Gareth Dean	End of interim spell	14 May 2023	Pre-season	(England) Gavin Cowan	16 May 2023
Farsley Celtic	(England) Russ Wilcox	Mutual consent	17 May 2023	Pre-season	(Jamaica) Clayton Donaldson	7 June 2023
Banbury United	(England) Andy Whing	Resigned	22 May 2023	Pre-season	(England) Mark Jones	5 June 2023
Southport	(England) Liam Watson	Promoted to Director of Football	17 August 2023	24th	(England) Jim Bentley	29 August 2023
Darlington	(England) Alun Armstrong	Sacked	6 September 2023	24th	(England) Josh Gowling	20 September 2023
Gloucester City	(England) Tim Flowers	Sacked	17 September 2023	23rd	(England) Mike Cook	19 September 2023
Spennymoor Town	(England) Jamie Chandler	Resigned	22 September 2023	4th	(England) Graeme Lee	2 January 2024
King's Lynn Town	(Northern Ireland) Mark Hughes	Sacked	25 September 2023	22nd	(England) Adam Lakeland	28 September 2023
Curzon Ashton	(England) Adam Lakeland	Signed by King's Lynn Town	28 September 2023	7th	(Republic of Ireland) Craig Mahon	28 September 2023
Darlington	(England) Josh Gowling	Sacked	26 December 2023	23rd	(England) Steve Watson	31 December 2023
South Shields	(Argentina) Julio Arca	Sacked	27 December 2023	8th	(England) Elliott Dickman	27 December 2023
Blyth Spartans	(England) Graham Fenton	Sacked	28 December 2023	14th	(England) Jon Shaw	29 December 2023
Banbury United	(England) Mark Jones	Sacked	25 January 2024	20th	(Northern Ireland) Kevin Wilson	30 January 2024
Blyth Spartans	(England) Jon Shaw	Sacked	29 April 2024	21st	(Peru) Nolberto Solano	3 May 2024

=== National League North table ===
Pos	Team	Pld	W	D	L	GF	GA	GD	Pts	Promotion, qualification or relegation
1	Tamworth (C, P)	46	29	9	8	74	29	+45	96	Promotion to National League
2	Scunthorpe United	46	26	10	10	84	38	+46	88	Qualification for the National League North play-off semi-finals
3	Brackley Town	46	25	10	11	65	37	+28	85	Qualification for the National League North play-off semi-finals
4	Chorley	46	25	8	13	81	50	+31	83	Qualification for the National League North play-off quarter-finals
5	Alfreton Town	46	23	11	12	76	50	+26	80	Qualification for the National League North play-off quarter-finals
6	Boston United (O, P)	46	21	12	13	68	46	+22	75	Qualification for the National League North play-off quarter-finals
7	Curzon Ashton	46	21	12	13	62	49	+13	75	Qualification for the National League North play-off quarter-finals
8	South Shields	46	22	8	16	79	53	+26	74	
9	Spennymoor Town	46	22	8	16	74	62	+12	74	
10	Chester	46	18	15	13	58	37	+21	69	
11	Hereford	46	20	9	17	62	66	−4	69	
12	Warrington Town	46	17	13	16	64	60	+4	64	
13	Scarborough Athletic	46	18	10	18	53	55	−2	64	
14	Buxton	46	17	11	18	70	63	+7	62	
15	Peterborough Sports	46	16	10	20	55	65	−10	58	
16	Darlington	46	16	8	22	52	72	−20	56	
17	Southport	46	16	8	22	54	75	−21	56	
18	King's Lynn Town	46	13	16	17	54	66	−12	55	
19	Rushall Olympic	46	15	9	22	61	73	−12	54	
20	Farsley Celtic	46	13	14	19	40	59	−19	53	
21	Blyth Spartans (R)	46	13	11	22	66	82	−16	50	Relegation to the Northern Premier League Premier Division
22	Banbury United (R)	46	10	8	28	38	86	−48	38	Relegation to the Southern League Premier Division Central
23	Gloucester City (R)	46	9	9	28	49	89	−40	36	Relegation to the Southern League Premier Division South
24	Bishop's Stortford (R)	46	6	3	37	35	112	−77	21	Relegation to the Southern League Premier Division Central

Source: National League official site
Rules for classification: 1) Points; 2) Goal difference; 3) Number of goals scored; 4) Number of matches won; 5) Head-to-head results
(C) Champions; (O) Play-off winners; (P) Promoted; (R) Relegated

=== Results table ===
Home \ Away	ALF	BAN	BIS	BLY	BOS	BRA	BUX	CHE	CHO	CUR	DAR	FAR	GLO	HER	KIN	PET	RUS	SCA	SCU	SOU	SPT	SPE	TAM	WAR
Alfreton Town	—	2–0	3–0	3–0	4–0	0–1	2–1	1–1	2–0	0–0	2–3	2–0	3–0	3–1	1–1	2–1	1–0	1–3	2–2	1–0	3–1	2–1	0–0	1–1
Banbury United	0–0	—	2–2	0–0	0–1	0–1	0–3	1–0	1–4	0–1	2–1	1–1	1–2	1–2	1–1	0–3	1–2	1–0	0–2	0–3	0–1	0–3	0–3	3–0
Bishop's Stortford	0–4	3–1	—	1–3	1–0	1–2	3–1	2–0	1–4	0–0	1–0	0–1	1–4	0–1	0–2	0–2	1–4	0–2	0–5	2–3	2–3	0–1	1–2	1–4
Blyth Spartans	1–3	2–2	3–0	—	2–2	1–5	3–2	2–2	1–1	2–3	1–2	4–0	4–2	2–1	0–1	2–3	1–2	0–1	1–1	2–1	3–3	2–0	0–1	1–2
Boston United	3–1	1–2	3–0	3–1	—	1–2	2–3	1–0	2–2	1–1	2–0	3–0	1–0	1–0	2–0	2–1	0–1	0–0	1–1	3–1	3–0	1–2	0–2	2–0
Brackley Town	1–0	3–1	1–0	1–1	2–1	—	2–1	3–1	1–0	0–2	1–0	0–0	2–0	2–0	1–3	3–1	0–1	0–1	2–0	1–1	0–0	3–1	3–0	2–0
Buxton	1–2	3–1	2–0	3–0	1–1	0–0	—	1–4	3–1	1–1	5–0	1–2	2–0	2–1	2–2	2–2	2–2	0–0	0–0	0–2	0–1	0–2	2–1	0–6
Chester	0–2	1–1	2–0	2–1	0–0	1–0	0–1	—	0–0	0–0	0–0	2–0	3–0	1–2	3–0	3–2	0–1	3–0	2–0	0–1	0–1	1–1	2–0	2–0
Chorley	3–2	3–0	2–1	2–0	0–3	1–1	3–2	0–2	—	4–0	8–0	1–1	3–1	1–2	3–1	2–0	2–1	3–0	1–1	2–1	3–0	2–1	1–0	0–1
Curzon Ashton	2–1	4–1	1–0	3–1	3–1	2–0	0–3	0–1	0–1	—	1–3	0–0	4–1	1–0	1–1	1–2	1–1	0–1	1–0	2–0	3–2	0–3	0–1	0–3
Darlington	0–2	3–1	0–2	0–0	0–0	1–1	2–1	3–2	0–3	1–3	—	3–1	1–1	2–0	1–2	1–0	1–1	0–1	4–0	2–2	2–0	1–2	0–1	1–1
Farsley Celtic	2–3	0–1	3–1	1–0	2–0	1–4	2–0	1–2	1–1	2–1	1–2	—	1–0	0–0	0–0	1–0	1–4	2–0	0–2	1–1	0–0	0–0	2–2	0–2
Gloucester City	3–0	0–2	1–1	0–1	3–7	1–1	0–0	1–6	0–2	3–0	0–1	0–1	—	2–3	1–2	2–1	2–0	1–0	1–2	0–5	2–2	4–2	1–2	1–3
Hereford	3–3	4–1	1–0	5–2	0–2	1–0	2–2	1–1	0–1	3–1	1–0	4–1	1–1	—	2–2	0–1	1–0	3–1	1–5	0–3	0–1	2–1	0–0	2–1
King's Lynn Town	2–1	1–2	3–2	1–1	1–2	2–2	1–3	0–0	1–0	0–4	0–1	0–0	1–1	2–2	—	0–1	2–1	3–4	3–1	3–1	1–4	0–1	1–1	0–0
Peterborough Sports	1–1	2–0	4–2	2–2	0–2	0–3	1–3	1–1	1–3	1–1	2–0	1–0	1–0	1–4	1–1	—	4–0	1–0	0–1	2–4	2–0	0–2	1–4	1–3
Rushall Olympic	1–1	1–1	4–0	1–3	1–0	0–2	0–3	1–1	5–0	2–2	3–2	0–2	3–3	0–1	1–2	1–0	—	4–2	0–3	2–0	2–3	4–3	1–2	0–0
Scarborough Athletic	0–1	3–0	5–0	1–0	3–2	2–1	1–0	1–0	1–1	0–2	2–0	1–2	1–1	3–0	2–0	1–1	3–1	—	0–0	1–1	0–1	1–1	0–1	2–2
Scunthorpe United	1–0	2–0	6–1	5–1	2–2	1–0	0–3	2–2	3–0	0–1	4–0	2–0	2–0	4–1	0–0	1–1	2–0	4–1	—	3–1	1–0	6–0	0–1	1–0
South Shields	3–1	4–0	7–0	1–3	1–2	0–1	1–0	0–1	2–1	0–0	0–4	2–1	3–0	0–0	2–0	1–2	2–0	1–0	2–1	—	3–0	2–0	1–0	1–1
Southport	2–3	0–1	4–1	2–3	0–2	3–1	2–2	0–2	0–2	0–3	2–0	1–1	2–1	1–2	0–4	0–0	3–0	3–1	0–1	1–0	—	1–2	0–0	0–4
Spennymoor Town	2–1	5–2	1–0	2–0	0–0	0–1	2–3	1–1	0–2	1–2	2–1	3–1	3–0	2–0	3–0	0–0	3–0	1–1	1–0	2–5	5–1	—	1–4	2–0
Tamworth	0–1	1–2	3–0	3–1	0–0	1–0	2–0	0–0	2–1	0–0	4–0	1–0	1–0	4–0	3–1	3–0	2–1	2–0	1–2	3–2	4–0	2–0	—	1–1
Warrington Town	2–2	2–1	2–1	0–2	0–0	2–2	1–0	1–0	2–1	1–4	1–3	1–1	1–2	1–2	1–0	0–1	2–1	4–0	0–2	2–2	0–3	3–3	0–3	—

Source: National League North Results Grid
Legend: Blue = home team win; Yellow = draw; Red = away team win.

=== Play-offs ===
Quarter-finals
5	Alfreton Town	0 (4)
6	Boston United	0 (5)
4	Chorley	0 (4)
7	Curzon Ashton	0 (2)

Semi-finals
2	Scunthorpe United	0 (4)
6	Boston United	0 (5)
3	Brackley Town	1
4	Chorley	0

Final
6	Boston United	2
3	Brackley Town	1

==== Quarter-finals ====
23 April 2024	Alfreton Town	0–0 (a.e.t.) (4–5 p)	Boston United	Alfreton
19:45 BST	Waldock (yellow card) 82'	Report	Rowe (yellow card) 43'; Nicholson (yellow card) 64'; Sotona (yellow card) 88'	Stadium: North Street; Attendance: 2,093; Referee: Darius Bradley
	Penalties
	McDonagh (penalty scored); Clackstone (penalty scored); Salmon (penalty scored); Waldock (penalty scored); Perritt (penalty missed)		(penalty scored) Bostwick; (penalty scored) Mills; (penalty scored) Hazel; (penalty scored) Sotona; (penalty scored) Gyasi

24 April 2024	Chorley	0–0 (a.e.t.) (4–2 p)	Curzon Ashton	Chorley
19:45 BST	Johnson (yellow card) 39'; Smith (yellow card) 90+6'	Report	Griffiths (yellow card) 36'; Mahon (yellow card) 39'; Barton (yellow card) 40'; Richards (yellow card) 90+2'	Stadium: Victory Park; Attendance: 2,128; Referee: Matthew McQuillan
	Penalties
	Hazlehurst (penalty missed); Whitehouse (penalty scored); Sampson (penalty scored); Henley (penalty scored); Glynn (penalty scored)		(penalty missed) Richards; (penalty scored) Spencer; (penalty scored) Hayhurst; (penalty missed) Campbell

==== Semi-finals ====
27 April 2024	Scunthorpe United	0–0 (a.e.t.) (4–5 p)	Boston United	Scunthorpe
15:00 BST	Beestin (yellow card) 51'; Clunan (yellow card) 73'; Roberts (yellow card) 87'; Scales (yellow card) 118'; Sembie-Ferris (yellow card) 120+2'; Kouogun (yellow card) 120+2'	Report	Mills (yellow card) 51'; Woods (yellow card) 74'; Sotona (yellow card) 120+2'	Stadium: Glanford Park; Attendance: 8,036; Referee: Zac Kennard-Kettle
	Penalties
	Clunan (penalty scored); Elliott (penalty scored); Barrows (penalty missed); Whitehall (penalty scored); Sembie-Ferris (penalty scored); McAlinden (penalty missed)		(penalty scored) Bostwick; (penalty scored) Mills; (penalty scored) Hazel; (penalty scored) Sotona; (penalty missed) Ward; (penalty scored) Richards

28 April 2024	Brackley Town	1–0	Chorley	Brackley
15:00 BST	Calder 78'	Report	Sampson (yellow card) 88'	Stadium: St. James Park; Attendance: 1,889

==== Final ====
4 May 2024
15:30 BST

Brackley Town	1–2	Boston United
Roberts 34'		Ward 45+3'; Knowles 58'

St. James Park, Brackley
Attendance: 3,074

=== Top scorers ===
Rank	Player	Club	Goals
1	(England) Paul Blackett	South Shields	30
2	(England) Danny Whitehall	Scunthorpe United	21
3	(England) Danny Newton	Brackley Town	19
4	(England) Jimmy Knowles	Boston United	18
5	(Italy) Diego De Girolamo	Buxton	16
5	(England) Will Harris	Spennymoor Town	16
5	(England) Kelsey Mooney	Boston United	16
5	(England) Jordan Thewlis	Alfreton Town	16
5	(England) Danny Waldron	Rushall Olympic	16

=== Hat-tricks ===
Player	For	Against	Result	Date
(England) Sam Osborne	Buxton	Darlington	5–0	2 September 2023
(England) Marcus Carver	Southport	King's Lynn Town	1–4	9 September 2023
(England) Sam Mantom	Rushall Olympic	Scarborough Athletic	4–2	23 September 2023
(England) Danny Waldron^{4}	Rushall Olympic	Chorley	5–0	21 October 2023
(England) Billy Whitehouse	Chorley	Darlington	8–0	14 November 2023
(England) Paul Blackett	South Shields	Spennymoor Town	2–5	14 November 2023
(England) Aiden Rutledge	Scarborough Athletic	Rushall Olympic	3–1	16 December 2023
(England) Connor Hall	Brackley Town	Banbury United	3–1	1 January 2024
(England) Harry Green	Scarborough Athletic	Hereford	3–0	6 January 2024
(England) Isaac Buckley-Ricketts	Warrington Town	Buxton	0–6	23 January 2024
(England) Jason Cowley	Hereford	Blyth Spartans	5–2	3 February 2024
(England) Kelsey Mooney^{4}	Boston United	Gloucester City	3–7	9 March 2024
(England) Jimmy Knowles	Boston United	Gloucester City	3–7	9 March 2024
(England) Danny Whitehall	Scunthorpe United	Bishop's Stortford	0–5	9 March 2024
(England) Kelsey Mooney	Boston United	Farsley Celtic	3–0	16 March 2024
(England) Jimmy Knowles	Boston United	Chorley	0–3	23 March 2024
(Spain) Stefan Mols	Curzon Ashton	Blyth Spartans	2–3	29 March 2024
(England) Paul Blackett	South Shields	Bishop's Stortford	7–0	6 April 2024

=== Monthly awards ===
Each month the Vanarama National League announces their official Player of the Month and Manager of the Month.

Month	Manager of the Month		Player of the Month		Reference
August	(England) Jimmy Dean	Scunthorpe United	(Republic of Ireland) Will Hayhurst	Curzon Ashton	
September	(England) Andy Peaks	Tamworth	(England) Marcus Carver	Southport	
October	(England) Calum McIntyre	Chester	(England) Jacob Butterfield	Scunthorpe United	
November	(England) Jim Bentley	Southport	(England) Isaac Sinclair	Curzon Ashton	
December	(England) Andy Preece	Chorley	(Republic of Ireland) Kyle Finn	Tamworth	
January	(England) Andy Peaks	Tamworth	(England) Liam Waldock	Alfreton Town	
February	(England) Graeme Lee	Spennymoor Town	(England) Dan Jarvis	Peterborough Sports	
March	(England) Graeme Lee	Spennymoor Town	(England) Jack Hazlehurst	Chorley	
April	(England) Steve Watson	Darlington	(Wales) Morgan Roberts	Brackley Town	

=== Annual awards ===
Award	Winner	Club
Player of the Season	(England) Paul Blackett	South Shields
Manager of the Season	(England) Andy Peaks	Tamworth

National League North Team of the Season

Pos.	Player	Club
GK	(England) Jas Singh	Tamworth
RB	(England) Matt Curley	Tamworth
CB	(England) Jordan Cullinane-Liburd	Tamworth
CB	(England) Mark Ellis	Chorley
LB	(England) Tyler Denton	Scunthorpe United
CM	(England) Jacob Butterfield	Scunthorpe United
CM	(England) Isaac Buckley-Ricketts	Warrington Town
CM	(Wales) Morgan Roberts	Brackley Town
CF	(Netherlands) Justin Johnson	Chorley
CF	(England) Paul Blackett	South Shields
CF	(England) Danny Whitehall	Scunthorpe United

== National League South ==
National League South
- Season: 2023–24
- Dates: 5 August 2023 – 6 May 2024
- Champions: Yeovil Town
- Promoted: Yeovil Town; Braintree Town
- Relegated: Dartford; Havant & Waterlooville; Dover Athletic; Taunton Town
- Matches: 552
- Goals: 1,566 (2.84 per match)
- Top goalscorer: (England) Ollie Pearce (40)
- Biggest home win: St Albans City 6–0 Taunton Town (10 February 2024)
- Biggest away win: Bath City 2–6 Weston-super-Mare (15 August 2023); Weymouth 1–5 Bath City (7 November 2023); Eastbourne Borough 0–4 Worthing (1 January 2024); Torquay United 0–4 St Albans City (3 February 2024); Eastbourne Borough 1–5 Maidstone United (29 March 2024); Havant & Waterlooville 1–5 Worthing (29 March 2024); Taunton Town 0–4 Slough Town (11 April 2024)
- Highest scoring: Worthing 6–4 Dover Athletic (10 February 2024)
- Highest attendance: Yeovil Town 3–0 Torquay United (29 March 2024) (6,462)
- Average attendance: 1,185

The National League South also consists of 24 teams.

=== Team changes ===
To National League South

Relegated from 2022–23 National League

- Torquay United
- Yeovil Town
- Maidstone United

Promoted from 2022–23 Isthmian League

- Aveley

Promoted from 2022–23 Southern League Premier Division South

- Weston-super-Mare
- Truro City

From National League South

Promoted to 2023–24 National League

- Ebbsfleet United
- Oxford City

Relegated to the 2023–24 Isthmian League

- Dulwich Hamlet
- Concord Rangers
- Cheshunt

Relegated to the 2023–24 Southern League

- Hungerford Town

=== Stadia and locations ===
Locations of the National League South 2023–24 teams (Greater London shown in more detail below)
Locations of the National League South 2023–24 teams (Greater London clubs)

Team	Location	Stadium	Capacity
Aveley	Aveley	Parkside	3,500
Bath City	Bath (Twerton)	Twerton Park	8,840
Braintree Town	Braintree	Cressing Road	4,085
Chelmsford City	Chelmsford	Melbourne Stadium	3,019
Chippenham Town	Chippenham	Hardenhuish Park	3,000
Dartford	Dartford	Princes Park	4,100
Dover Athletic	Dover	Crabble Athletic Ground	5,745
Eastbourne Borough	Eastbourne	Priory Lane	4,151
Farnborough	Farnborough	Cherrywood Road	7,000
Hampton & Richmond Borough	London (Hampton)	Beveree Stadium	3,500
Havant & Waterlooville	Havant	Westleigh Park	5,300
Hemel Hempstead Town	Hemel Hempstead	Vauxhall Road	3,152
Maidstone United	Maidstone	Gallagher Stadium	4,200
Slough Town	Slough	Arbour Park	2,000
St Albans City	St Albans	Clarence Park	4,500
Taunton Town	Taunton	Wordsworth Drive	2,500
Tonbridge Angels	Tonbridge	Longmead Stadium	3,000
Torquay United	Torquay	Plainmoor	6,500
Truro City	Plymouth	Bolitho Park	3,500
Welling United	London (Welling)	Park View Road	4,000
Weston-super-Mare	Weston-super-Mare	Woodspring Stadium	3,500
Weymouth	Weymouth	Bob Lucas	6,600
Worthing	Worthing	Woodside Road	4,000
Yeovil Town	Yeovil	Huish Park	9,566

=== Managerial changes ===
Team	Outgoing manager	Manner of departure	Date of vacancy	Position in table	Incoming manager(s)	Date of appointment
Eastbourne Borough	(England) Danny Bloor	Mutual consent	5 June 2023	Pre-season	(England) Mark Beard	8 June 2023
Welling United	(Northern Ireland) Warren Feeney	Resigned	5 June 2023	Pre-season	(England) Danny Bloor	13 June 2023
Havant & Waterlooville	(England) Jamie Collins	Sacked	8 September 2023	24th	(England) Steve King	8 September 2023
Havant & Waterlooville	(England) Steve King	Sacked	1 December 2023	24th	(England) Cliff De Gordon (England) Ross Betteridge (England) Richard Pope (interim)	1 December 2023
Dover Athletic	(England) Mitch Brundle	Sacked	5 December 2023	23rd	(England) Jake Leberl	5 December 2023
Eastbourne Borough	(England) Mark Beard	Sacked	1 January 2024	21st	(England) Adam Murray	4 January 2024
Dartford	(England) Alan Dowson	Sacked	11 January 2024	16th	(England) Tony Burman (interim)	11 January 2024
St Albans City	(England) David Noble	Signed by Wealdstone	26 January 2024	9th	(England) Harry Wheeler (interim)	26 January 2024
Welling United	(England) Danny Bloor	Sacked	28 January 2024	22nd	(England) Rod Stringer	29 January 2024
Torquay United	(England) Gary Johnson	Mutual consent	22 February 2024	11th	(Australia) Aaron Downes (interim)	22 February 2024
St Albans City	(England) Harry Wheeler	End of interim spell	22 February 2024	5th	(England) Jon Meakes	22 February 2024
Worthing	(England) Adam Hinshelwood	Signed by York City	27 February 2024	3rd	(England) Aarran Racine (interim)	27 February 2024
Dartford	(England) Tony Burman	End of interim spell	1 March 2024	18th	(England) Adrian Pennock	1 March 2024
Hemel Hempstead Town	(England) Bradley Quinton	Sacked	5 March 2024	15th	(England) Alan Dowson (interim)	7 March 2024
Weymouth	(England) Bobby Wilkinson	Mutual consent	27 March 2024	14th	(England) Jason Matthews (interim)	27 March 2024
Weymouth	(England) Jason Matthews	End of interim spell	1 April 2024	15th	(England) Mark Molesley	1 April 2024
Hemel Hempstead Town	(England) Alan Dowson	End of interim spell	15 April 2024	18th	(England) Bobby Wilkinson	15 April 2024

=== National League South table ===
Pos	Team	Pld	W	D	L	GF	GA	GD	Pts	Promotion, qualification or relegation
1	Yeovil Town (C, P)	46	29	8	9	81	45	+36	95	Promotion to National League
2	Chelmsford City	46	24	12	10	76	43	+33	84	Qualification for the National League South play-off semi-finals
3	Worthing	46	26	6	14	104	72	+32	84	Qualification for the National League South play-off semi-finals
4	Maidstone United	46	24	11	11	72	52	+20	83	Qualification for the National League South play-off quarter-finals
5	Braintree Town (O, P)	46	23	12	11	64	42	+22	81	Qualification for the National League South play-off quarter-finals
6	Bath City	46	20	13	13	69	51	+18	73	Qualification for the National League South play-off quarter-finals
7	Aveley	46	21	10	15	68	61	+7	73	Qualification for the National League South play-off quarter-finals
8	Farnborough	46	20	12	14	76	67	+9	72	
9	Hampton & Richmond Borough	46	20	12	14	61	57	+4	72	
10	Slough Town	46	18	14	14	81	69	+12	68	
11	St Albans City	46	20	8	18	77	67	+10	68	
12	Chippenham Town	46	16	14	16	62	62	0	62	
13	Weston-super-Mare	46	17	8	21	66	74	−8	59	
14	Tonbridge Angels	46	15	13	18	65	66	−1	58	
15	Weymouth	46	13	17	16	57	64	−7	56	
16	Truro City	46	15	10	21	58	67	−9	55	
17	Welling United	46	12	18	16	56	71	−15	54	
18	Torquay United	46	19	7	20	73	76	−3	53 (Note: On 13 March 2024, Torquay United were deducted ten points after the club submitted its intention to appoint administrators. Another one-point deduction was applied on 12 April, for fielding a suspended player.)	
19	Eastbourne Borough	46	14	10	22	53	74	−21	52	
20	Hemel Hempstead Town	46	13	11	22	55	71	−16	50	
21	Dartford (R)	46	12	10	24	56	75	−19	46	Relegation to the Isthmian League Premier Division
22	Taunton Town (R)	46	10	16	20	44	71	−27	46	Relegation to the Southern League Premier Division South
23	Havant & Waterlooville (R)	46	10	7	29	52	92	−40	37	Relegation to the Southern League Premier Division South
24	Dover Athletic (R)	46	4	15	27	40	77	−37	27	Relegation to the Isthmian League Premier Division

Source: National League official site
Rules for classification: 1) Points; 2) Goal difference; 3) Number of goals scored; 4) Number of matches won; 5) Head-to-head results
(C) Champions; (O) Play-off winners; (P) Promoted; (R) Relegated

=== Results table ===
Home \ Away	AVE	BAT	BRA	CHE	CHI	DAR	DOV	EAS	FAR	HAM	HAV	HEM	MAI	SLO	STA	TAU	TON	TOR	TRU	WEL	WSM	WEY	WOR	YEO
Aveley	—	2–0	1–1	1–2	2–2	0–1	2–1	2–0	3–4	3–0	1–2	2–1	2–0	0–2	2–1	4–1	2–1	2–1	1–1	2–2	2–0	0–2	0–3	0–0
Bath City	3–0	—	1–2	2–3	0–0	1–0	2–2	1–0	0–2	3–1	2–0	2–0	3–0	1–2	3–1	3–0	1–1	1–0	2–1	4–0	2–6	1–1	0–2	0–1
Braintree Town	1–0	1–1	—	0–3	0–0	2–0	3–0	2–3	1–1	3–1	4–1	2–0	1–2	1–1	4–0	0–0	1–0	1–0	3–2	4–1	2–0	0–0	4–0	0–1
Chelmsford City	2–0	3–1	3–0	—	2–2	4–1	3–3	1–0	1–0	1–1	1–1	1–2	0–1	1–1	0–2	0–0	3–0	2–0	1–2	1–0	1–1	1–0	0–1	1–0
Chippenham Town	1–0	1–2	0–1	1–1	—	1–4	2–1	4–2	2–1	1–2	1–0	2–3	0–2	2–1	1–2	3–3	1–2	1–1	0–0	4–1	0–1	1–1	3–1	1–1
Dartford	1–2	3–3	0–2	1–2	0–1	—	2–0	0–2	1–1	1–1	2–0	1–1	0–2	1–2	0–3	1–1	1–0	3–0	2–1	1–1	4–2	0–1	1–2	2–2
Dover Athletic	2–1	0–0	1–1	1–0	1–1	1–2	—	1–1	1–3	0–1	0–0	2–2	0–1	1–0	0–1	2–2	1–2	2–2	0–2	2–2	0–1	1–3	0–2	1–3
Eastbourne Borough	1–2	1–2	3–1	0–3	3–0	1–1	1–1	—	2–1	1–0	2–1	1–0	1–5	3–3	1–2	2–0	0–3	1–4	0–1	2–2	2–1	1–0	0–4	0–1
Farnborough	3–1	2–2	1–0	1–1	3–1	2–1	4–0	1–1	—	3–1	2–4	2–1	0–1	2–2	2–1	0–1	4–1	0–0	3–2	1–0	3–0	1–1	0–3	1–3
Hampton & Richmond Borough	0–1	0–1	1–1	0–1	2–1	4–3	1–0	1–0	1–1	—	2–0	2–1	5–2	2–1	0–0	1–1	0–0	3–1	2–1	1–1	2–1	1–0	4–1	1–2
Havant & Waterlooville	1–4	1–1	1–2	2–1	2–4	1–2	4–3	1–2	0–1	1–2	—	2–0	2–1	2–1	1–2	3–0	2–2	0–2	1–3	0–0	1–2	1–1	1–5	4–3
Hemel Hempstead Town	3–4	0–0	0–2	1–4	0–2	2–1	1–1	1–0	2–1	1–2	0–2	—	1–1	2–3	2–3	1–0	2–0	3–2	0–0	1–2	1–2	1–2	2–0	1–0
Maidstone United	0–1	2–2	1–1	2–0	0–1	2–1	1–0	2–0	1–1	5–1	3–1	1–1	—	2–1	1–2	1–1	2–0	3–2	2–1	1–1	1–0	2–0	4–0	2–1
Slough Town	2–0	H/W (Note: Match awarded to Slough Town in accordance with League rules, after initial match was abandoned with Slough Town leading 4–2 due to a medical emergency in the crowd.)	3–0	0–0	2–2	3–2	1–2	1–1	2–2	3–3	2–1	2–0	2–1	—	2–2	3–0	2–5	1–2	4–0	1–1	2–0	0–0	1–4	0–0
St Albans City	0–1	0–2	0–1	2–1	0–1	1–0	2–0	2–3	2–1	1–0	4–1	1–2	3–2	3–2	—	6–0	2–3	0–1	1–2	1–1	0–1	2–1	2–4	1–1
Taunton Town	2–2	0–2	2–1	2–3	1–2	1–0	1–1	2–1	4–0	0–1	0–0	0–0	0–1	0–4	3–2	—	2–2	1–2	0–0	1–0	0–1	0–2	1–1	0–1
Tonbridge Angels	1–1	3–2	0–0	1–1	2–0	4–0	1–0	2–0	1–2	0–0	4–1	3–3	1–1	1–2	2–2	0–3	—	4–1	2–1	0–1	0–1	2–1	0–1	2–4
Torquay United	2–2	1–0	2–1	2–1	2–1	4–1	1–0	2–2	3–0	1–0	5–0	3–2	0–1	3–4	0–4	0–3	2–1	—	0–1	5–1	3–3	3–1	0–3	1–3
Truro City	1–1	1–1	1–2	1–4	0–2	0–0	1–0	0–0	3–1	1–2	1–0	0–2	3–1	3–2	3–1	2–0	1–2	1–2	—	5–2	0–1	0–0	1–4	0–2
Welling United	1–3	0–1	2–2	1–2	0–0	0–1	1–0	0–2	2–2	2–1	3–2	0–1	0–0	4–3	0–0	0–0	2–2	1–0	3–2	—	3–1	0–0	4–1	4–1
Weston-super-Mare	1–2	0–1	0–1	0–3	2–1	2–2	1–0	1–1	0–3	1–1	1–0	1–1	1–1	0–3	0–2	4–0	3–1	3–2	2–3	4–2	—	2–3	4–0	2–3
Weymouth	1–1	1–5	0–1	0–3	1–1	1–0	1–1	3–1	1–2	2–4	4–1	4–3	2–3	3–0	3–3	1–1	1–1	1–1	2–0	1–1	3–3	—	1–4	H/W (Note: Match awarded to Weymouth in accordance with League rules, after initial match was abandoned with Weymouth leading 1–0 due to a medical emergency in the crowd.)
Worthing	1–2	2–2	0–1	2–3	3–1	3–4	6–4	3–0	2–3	2–0	3–0	1–1	5–1	1–1	4–4	1–3	1–0	4–2	2–2	2–0	4–2	2–0	—	1–2
Yeovil Town	3–1	2–0	2–0	1–1	1–3	3–1	2–0	3–2	4–2	0–0	1–0	2–0	1–1	3–1	2–1	4–1	2–0	3–0	2–1	0–1	2–1	2–0	1–3	—

Source: National League South Results Grid
Legend: Blue = home team win; Yellow = draw; Red = away team win.

=== Play-offs ===
Quarter-finals
5	Braintree Town	1
6	Bath City	0
4	Maidstone United	2
7	Aveley	1

Semi-finals
2	Chelmsford City	2
5	Braintree Town	3
3	Worthing	2
4	Maidstone United	1

Final
5	Braintree Town	4
3	Worthing	3

==== Quarter-finals ====
23 April 2024	Braintree Town	1–0 (a.e.t.)	Bath City	Braintree
19:45 BST	Blackwell 118'	Report	Smith (yellow card) 104'	Stadium: Cressing Road; Attendance: 1,067; Referee: Niall Smith; Assistant referees: Minesh Gupta & Joseph Larkin; Fourth official: Harry Wager

24 April 2024	Maidstone United	2–1	Aveley	Maidstone
19:45 BST	Gurung (yellow card) 45+3'; (yellow card) 62': Rush 63'; Faal 90+2' (yellow card) 90+3'	Report	Ogunrinde 27'; Kelly (yellow card) 45+3'	Stadium: Gallagher Stadium; Attendance: 3,080; Referee: Elliot Bell; Assistant referees: Adam Merchant & Jordan Mcritchie; Fourth official: Steven Hughes

==== Semifinals ====
27 April 2024	Chelmsford City	2–3 (a.e.t.)	Braintree Town	Chelmsford
15:00 BST	Francis 90' (yellow card) 70'; Alexander 90+2'; Jenkins (yellow card) 119'		Davies 54' (yellow card) 70'; Sears 65' (yellow card) 39'; (yellow card) 65'; Davis 98'	Stadium: Melbourne Stadium; Attendance: 3,017; Referee: Jonathan Maskrey; Assistant referees: Drew Dutton & David Constable; Fourth official: Harry Jones

28 April 2024	Worthing	2–1	Maidstone United	Worthing
15:00 BST	Pearce 24' (pen.), 89'	Report	Fowler (yellow card) 23'; Bentley 40'; Tanga (yellow card) 63'	Stadium: Woodside Road; Attendance: 2,858; Referee: Oliver Mackey; Assistant referees: Keiran Forrest & Joseph Karram; Fourth official: Costantine Hatzidakis

==== Final ====
6 May 2024	Worthing	3–4 (a.e.t.)	Braintree Town	Worthing
15:00 BST	Pearce 36'; Spong 53'; Cashman 67'	Report	Odusanya 23'; Blair 61' (yellow card) 115'; Rendall (yellow card) 64'; Wakefield 65'; Lambe 108'	Stadium: Woodside Road; Attendance: 2,621; Referee: Ross Martin; Assistant referees: Jack Nield & Harley Hetherington; Fourth official: Samuel Read

=== Top scorers ===
Rank	Player	Club	Goals
1	(England) Ollie Pearce	Worthing	40
2	(England) Shaun Jeffers	St. Albans City	26
3	(England) Charlie Ruff	Chelmsford City	19
4	(England) Cody Cooke	Bath City	18
5	(England) George Alexander	Chelmsford City; Slough Town; Dartford	17
5	(England) Siju Odelusi	Aveley	17
7	(England) John Goddard	Slough Town	16
7	(England) Matt Rush	Maidstone United; Aveley	16
7	(England) Scott Wilson	Bath City	16
10	(England) Aaron Blair	Braintree Town	15

=== Hat-tricks ===
Player	For	Against	Result	Date
(England) Siju Odelusi	Aveley	Taunton Town	4–1	12 August 2023
(England) George Alexander	Slough Town	Weston-super-Mare	0–3	19 August 2023
(England) Zak Emmerson	Eastbourne Borough	St Albans City	2–3	7 October 2023
(England) Mason Bloomfield	Hampton & Richmond Borough	Maidstone United	5–2	11 November 2023
(England) Cody Cooke	Bath City	Aveley	3–0	11 November 2023
(Scotland) Jordan Young	Yeovil Town	Farnborough	4–2	14 November 2023
(England) Tristan Abrahams	Welling United	Yeovil Town	4–1	25 November 2023
(England) Ollie Pearce	Worthing	Chippenham Town	3–1	2 December 2023
(England) Ollie Pearce	Worthing	Maidstone United	5–1	16 December 2023
(England) Ollie Pearce	Worthing	Dover Athletic	6–4	10 February 2024
(England) Shaun Jeffers	St Albans City	Taunton Town	6–0	10 February 2024
(England) Ollie Pearce^{4}	Worthing	Weymouth	1–4	17 February 2024
(England) Charlee Hughes	Aveley	Hemel Hempstead Town	3–4	29 March 2024
(Jamaica) Lamar Reynolds	Maidstone United	Eastbourne Borough	1–5	29 March 2024

=== Monthly awards ===
Each month the Vanarama National League announces their official Player of the Month and Manager of the Month.

Month	Manager of the Month		Player of the Month		Reference
August	(England) Adam Hinshelwood	Worthing	(England) Scott Wilson	Bath City	
September	(England) Rob Dray	Taunton Town	(England) Levi Amantchi	Maidstone United	
October	(England) Mark Cooper	Yeovil Town	(England) Ben Seymour	Hampton & Richmond Borough	
November	(England) Mel Gwinnett	Hampton & Richmond Borough	(England) John Goddard	Slough Town	
December	(England) Paul Wotton	Truro City	(England) Ollie Pearce	Worthing	
January	(England) Robbie Simpson	Chelmsford City	(England) Sam Corne	Maidstone United	
February	(Wales) Angelo Harrop	Braintree Town	(England) Ollie Pearce	Worthing	
March	(England) Spencer Day	Farnborough	(England) Joe Haigh	Farnborough	
April	(England) Aarran Racine	Worthing	(England) Sam Corne	Maidstone United	

=== Annual awards ===
Award	Winner	Club
Player of the Season	(England) Ollie Pearce	Worthing
Manager of the Season	(England) Mark Cooper	Yeovil Town

National League South Team of the Season

Pos.	Player	Club
GK	(England) Jack Sims	Braintree Town
RB	(England) Joe Felix	Worthing
CB	(England) Luke Jenkins	Chelmsford City
CB	(England) Jake Wannell	Yeovil Town
LB	(England) Danny Greenslade	Bath City
CM	(England) Sam Corne	Maidstone United
CM	(England) Matt Worthington	Yeovil Town
CM	(England) Charlie Ruff	Chelmsford City
CF	(England) Ollie Pearce	Worthing
CF	(Scotland) Jordan Young	Yeovil Town
CF	(England) Shaun Jeffers	St Albans City
