= Liam Waldock =

English footballer

Personal information
- Full name: Liam Brian Waldock
- Date of birth: 25 September 2000 (age 26)
- Place of birth: Sheffield, England
- Height: 5 ft 10 in (1.78 m)
- Position: Midfielder

Team information
- Current team: Worksop Town (on loan from Boston United)
- Number: 25

Youth career
- 2008–2019: Sheffield Wednesday

Senior career*
Years	Team	Apps	(Gls)
2019–2022	Sheffield Wednesday	0	(0)
2021	→ Gainsborough Trinity (loan)	9	(0)
2022–2023	Gainsborough Trinity	40	(17)
2023–2025	Alfreton Town	82	(19)
2025–	Boston United	12	(1)
2026	→ Worksop Town (loan)	10	(3)
2026–	→ Worksop Town (loan)	14	(1)
- * Club domestic league appearances and goals as of 17:25, 21 November 2026 (UTC)

Liam Waldock (born 25 September 2000) is an English professional footballer who plays as a midfielder for Worksop Town on loan from National League side Boston United.

== Club career ==
=== Sheffield Wednesday ===
Liam signed his first professional contract on 25 September 2017, signing a deal until 2020. He signed a contract extension until the summer of 2021 on 28 February 2020. He made his senior debut on 23 September 2020, starting an EFL Cup game against Fulham. A one-year option was activated in his contract on 12 May 2021, keeping him at the club until the summer of 2022. On 16 March 2022, manager Darren Moore announced he would be leaving the club upon the expiry of his contract.

=== Gainsborough Trinity ===
On 7 September 2021, he joined Gainsborough Trinity on a one-month loan deal, making his debut the same day against Morpeth Town. His loan spell was extended on 5 October for a further month, before returning to his parent club on 1 November. On 13 June 2022, it was announced Waldock would return to Gainsborough Trinity following the expiration of his contract at Sheffield Wednesday, joining on a permanent deal. On 4 July 2023 it was confirmed that Waldock would leave the club to an unnamed team.

=== Alfreton Town ===
On leaving Gainsborough Trinity, it was confirmed that Waldock had signed for Alfreton Town. Waldock was awarded the National League North Player of the Month award for January 2024 having scored in five out of his club's six fixtures across the month, assisting a further two goals. At the end of the 2024–25 season, he was offered a new deal by Alfreton Town, but he decided to decline and move on.

=== Boston United ===
On 6 June 2025, Waldock joined National League side Boston United on a two-year deal. On 7 March 2026, he joined Worksop Town on loan until the end of the season. On 25 June 2026, he return to Worksop Town on a season-long loan.

== Career statistics ==
As of 21 November 2026

Appearances and goals by club, season and competition
Club	Season	League			FA Cup		EFL Cup		Other		Total	
Club	Season	Division	Apps	Goals	Apps	Goals	Apps	Goals	Apps	Goals	Apps	Goals
Sheffield Wednesday	2020–21	Championship	0	0	0	0	1	0	0	0	1	0
Sheffield Wednesday	2021–22	League One	0	0	0	0	0	0	1 (Note: Appearance(s) in EFL Trophy)	0	1	0
Sheffield Wednesday	Total		0	0	0	0	1	0	1	0	2	0
Gainsborough Trinity (loan)	2021–22	Northern Premier League	9	0	0	0	—		1 (Note: Appearance(s) in FA Trophy)	0	10	0
Gainsborough Trinity	2022–23	Northern Premier League	40	17	5	3	—		1 (Note: Appearance(s) in Northern Premier League playoffs)	0	46	20
Alfreton Town	2023–24	National League North	42	12	4	2	—		2 (Note: Appearance(s) in FA Trophy & National League North playoffs)	0	48	14
Alfreton Town	2024–25	National League North	40	7	5	3	—		2	1	47	11
Alfreton Town	Total		82	19	9	5	0	0	4	1	95	25
Boston United	2025–26	National League	12	1	1	0	—		2 (Note: Appearance(s) in National League Cup & FA Trophy)	0	15	1
Boston United	2026–27	National League	0	0	0	0	—		0	0	0	0
Boston United	Total		12	1	1	0	0	0	2	0	15	1
Worksop Town (loan)	2025–26	National League North	10	3	—		—		—		10	3
Worksop Town (loan)	2026–27	National League North	14	1	1	1	—		1	0	16	2
Worksop Town (loan)	Total		24	4	1	1	0	0	1	0	26	5
Career total			168	41	16	9	1	0	9	1	194	51

== Honours ==
Individual

- National League North Player of the Month: January 2024
