= Garrett Kelly =

English footballer (born 1996)

Personal information
- Full name: Garrett Christopher Kelly
- Date of birth: 13 April 1996 (age 30)
- Place of birth: Homerton, England
- Height: 1.86 m (6 ft 1 in)
- Position: Center-back

Team information
- Current team: FC Alay Osh

Youth career
- Brentwood Town
- Hornchurch
- Waltham Abbey

Senior career*
| Years | Team | Apps | (Gls) |
| 2015 | Waltham Abbey | 2 | (0) |
| 2017 | Hungerford Town | 0 | (0) |
| 2017 | Barkingside | 13 | (0) |
| 2017–2018 | Romford | 9 | (1) |
| 2018 | Aveley | 9 | (1) |
| 2018–2019 | Nafpaktiakos | 15 | (0) |
| 2019 | Hornchurch | 1 | (0) |
| 2019–2020 | Agios Nikolaos | 10 | (1) |
| 2020 | Episkopi | 4 | (0) |
| 2020–2021 | Almyros Gaziou | 13 | (1) |
| 2021 | Connah's Quay Nomads | 0 | (0) |
| 2021 | Chippenham Town | 1 | (0) |
| 2021–2022 | Leatherhead | 7 | (0) |
| 2022 | Heybridge Swifts | 5 | (1) |
| 2022–2024 | Aveley | 82 | (6) |
| 2024 | AFC Totton | 2 | (0) |
| 2024 | Welling United | 8 | (0) |
| 2024–2025 | Tonbridge Angels | 6 | (0) |
| 2025 | Welling United | 2 | (0) |
| 2025–2026 | Soul Tower Hamlets | 18 | (2) |
| 2026– | FC Alay Osh | 12 | (4) |

International career^{‡}
| 2025– | Sri Lanka | 11 | (0) |
- * Club domestic league appearances and goals as of 12 June 2026 ‡ National team caps and goals as of 08 June 2026

Garrett Christopher Kelly (born 13 April 1996) is a footballer who plays as a center-back or defensive midfielder for Kyrgyz Premier League club FC Alay Osh. Born in England, he plays for the Sri Lanka national football team.

== Club career ==
Born in Homerton in the London Borough of Hackney, Kelly played for the youth teams of Brentwood Town and Hornchurch. His first senior side was Waltham Abbey, where he made two league appearances. He had a short spell with National League South side Hungerford Town, but made no appearances before trialling with Portuguese side Imortal.

Stints with Romford, Barkingside and Aveley followed, before he moved to Greece, notably trialling with Paniliakos in a friendly match against Nafpaktiakos and then trialling with Nafpaktiakos themselves the following day. He was offered a contract with Nafpaktiakos, signing in September 2018. Shortly after signing, Kelly was taken to hospital after suffering an injury in another pre-season friendly.

He returned briefly to England to re-join former club Hornchurch, but only made one appearance before returning to Greece. On his return to Greece he joined Agios Nikolaos. After six months he moved to Episkopi. He made fourteen appearances in the 2019–20 season before the COVID-19 pandemic halted the season, and he joined Almyros Gaziou in July 2020.

Despite being offered a contract with Almyros, Kelly moved to Wales after a year with the Greek club. He signed for Connah's Quay Nomads ahead of the 2021–22 season. However, only months later he had joined Chippenham Town, going on to make one appearance in the National League South.

Spells with Leatherhead and Heybridge Swifts - where he scored on his debut - followed, before Kelly returned to Aveley in March 2022. He renewed his contract ahead of each of the following two seasons, before joining Southern League side Totton in August 2024. In October 2024, he joined Welling United.

In December 2024, Kelly joined fellow National League South side Tonbridge Angels.

== International career ==
Though he was born in England, Kelly is eligible to represent the Sri Lanka national football team.

== Career statistics ==
=== Club ===
As of 30 September 2024

Appearances and goals by club, season and competition
| Club | Season | League | | | Cup | | Other | | Total | |
| Club | Season | Division | Apps | Goals | Apps | Goals | Apps | Goals | Apps | Goals |
|---|---|---|---|---|---|---|---|---|---|---|
| Waltham Abbey | 2015–16 | Isthmian League | 2 | 0 | 0 | 0 | 2 (Note: Appearances in the Alan Turvey Trophy) | 0 | 4 | 0 |
| Hungerford Town | 2017–18 | National League South | 0 | 0 | 0 | 0 | 0 | 0 | 0 | 0 |
| Barkingside | 2017–18 | Essex Senior League | 13 | 0 | 0 | 0 | 1 (Note: Appearances in the Errington Challenge Cup) | 0 | 14 | 0 |
| Romford | 2017–18 | Isthmian League | 9 | 1 | 0 | 0 | 2 | 0 | 11 | 1 |
| Aveley | 2017–18 | Isthmian League | 9 | 1 | 0 | 0 | 0 | 0 | 9 | 1 |
| Nafpaktiakos | 2018–19 | Gamma Ethniki | 15 | 0 | 0 | 0 | 0 | 0 | 15 | 0 |
| Hornchurch | 2019–20 | Isthmian League | 1 | 0 | 0 | 0 | 0 | 0 | 1 | 0 |
| Agios Nikolaos | 2019–20 | Gamma Ethniki | 10 | 1 | 0 | 0 | 0 | 0 | 10 | 1 |
| Episkopi | 2019–20 | Gamma Ethniki | 4 | 0 | 0 | 0 | 0 | 0 | 4 | 0 |
| Almyros Gaziou | 2020–21 | Gamma Ethniki | 13 | 1 | 0 | 0 | 0 | 0 | 13 | 1 |
| Connah's Quay Nomads | 2021–22 | Cymru Premier | 0 | 0 | 0 | 0 | 0 | 0 | 0 | 0 |
| Chippenham Town | 2021–22 | National League South | 1 | 0 | 0 | 0 | 0 | 0 | 1 | 0 |
| Leatherhead | 2021–22 | Isthmian League | 7 | 0 | 0 | 0 | 0 | 0 | 7 | 0 |
| Heybridge Swifts | 2021–22 | Isthmian League | 5 | 1 | 0 | 0 | 0 | 0 | 5 | 1 |
| Aveley | 2021–22 | Isthmian League | 7 | 2 | 0 | 0 | 0 | 0 | 7 | 2 |
| Aveley | 2022–23 | Isthmian League | 37 | 2 | 1 (Note: Appearances in FA Cup qualification) | 0 | 8 (Note: One appearance in FA Trophy qualification, four appearances and one goal in the Alan Turvey Trophy, one appearance in the Essex Senior Cup and two appearances in the Isthmian League promotion playoffs) | 1 | 46 | 3 |
| Aveley | 2023–24 | National League South | 35 | 1 | 2 | 0 | 4 (Note: Two appearances in the FA Trophy, one appearance in the Essex Senior Cup) | 0 | 41 | 1 |
| Aveley | 2024–25 | National League South | 3 | 1 | 0 | 0 | 0 | 0 | 3 | 1 |
| Aveley | Total | | 82 | 6 | 3 | 0 | 12 | 1 | 97 | 7 |
| Totton | 2024–25 | Southern League | 2 | 0 | 0 | 0 | 0 | 0 | 2 | 0 |
| Career total | | | 173 | 11 | 3 | 0 | 17 | 1 | 193 | 12 |

=== International ===
As of matches played 2 May 2025

| National team | Year | Apps | Goals |
|---|---|---|---|
| Sri Lanka | 2025 | 2 | 0 |
| Total | | 2 | 0 |
