= Dartford F.C. =

Association Football club in Dartford, England

Dartford
- Full name: Dartford Football Club
- Nickname: The Darts
- Founded: 1888; 138 years ago
- Ground: Princes Park, Dartford, Kent
- Capacity: 4,100 (642 seated)
- Chairman: Steve Irving
- Manager: Ben Greenhalgh
- League: Isthmian League Premier Division
- 2025–26: Isthmian League Premier Division, 6th of 22
- Website: dartfordfc.com
Home colours	Away colours

Dartford Football Club is a semi-professional association football club based in Dartford, Kent, England. The club participates in the Isthmian League Premier Division, the seventh tier of the English football league system.

The club was formed in 1888 by members of the Dartford Working Men's Club. After winning the Isthmian League Division One North in the 2007–08 season and the Isthmian League Premier Division in the 2009–10 season, Dartford were promoted to the Conference Premier in 2012, in which they spent three seasons. The club's best performances in the FA Cup came in 1936 and 1937, when they reached the third round of the competition; they have also reached the final of the FA Trophy once, in 1974.

Home matches are played at the club's environmentally friendly stadium, Princes Park, opened in November 2006.

== History ==
=== Early history ===
1904–05 team

Dartford Football Club was formed in 1888 by members of the Dartford Working Men's Club, initially playing only friendlies. The club soon was entering cup competitions, reaching the final of the Kent Senior Cup in 1894. Following this, Dartford were founder members of the Kent League for the 1894–95 season, and entered the FA Cup for the first time the season after.

Two seasons later, Dartford became founder members of the Southern League Division Two, winning the Championship at the first attempt. They took part in the 1898–99 Thames & Medway League, however they finished bottom. The club moved between the Southern and Kent Leagues several times over the following seasons, dropping to the West Kent League in the 1900s, following financial difficulties. Around the same time the club found its first permanent home ground, Summers Meadow in Lowfield Street, obtained on a long lease.

In 1908–09 Dartford won the West Kent League and Cup 'double' and rejoined the Kent League where they remained until the outbreak of the First World War. In 1913 Dartford undertook a short tour of Norway culminating in a 6–1 win over a Norway XI.

=== Post-1918 ===
Darts continued their association with the Kent League, winning the league cup in 1923–24, before switching to the Southern League in time for the 1926–27 season. At the start of the 1930s the Dartford Board appointed the successful Kettering Town manager, Bill Collier, as manager. The Scot continued his pattern of success with Dartford and won trophies by the shoal during the decade leading up to the 1939–45 war.

Dartford won the Southern League Eastern section title in 1930–31 and 1931–32 (missing a hat-trick by just one point the season after) and the overall Championship of the League was won with victories over the Western Section winners Exeter City Reserves 7–2 away and Yeovil & Petters United 2–1 at home respectively. In county football Dartford won the Kent Senior Cup four times in five seasons and the Kent Senior Shield three times.

In addition Dartford gained a reputation nationally by becoming the first club outside the Football League to reach the FA Cup Third Round Proper in successive seasons. In 1935–36 Dartford lost to a star-studded Derby County (then second in Division One) by 3–2 at the Baseball Ground having at one time led by 2–0. Leading player Fred Dell was transferred to West Ham United for a reported £2,000 immediately after the game. The following season saw Dartford lose 0–1 at home to Darlington at the same stage. Towards the end of the decade Mr Collier, who had brought a distinctive Scottish flavour to Dartford, resigned to take over a business in Scotland and the period was seen out in a comparatively quiet vein.

=== Post-1945 ===
For a decade and a half following the 1939–1945 war, Dartford had little to show for its efforts except for a sparkling win over Bromley in Kent Senior Cup in 1947. At the time, Bromley vied with Bishop Auckland as the premier amateur club in the land and the Lillywhites look a 2–0 lead in the final before Dartford struck back with three goals to lift the trophy. Included in the Dartford line-up that day was Ted Croker, later to become the Secretary of the Football Association. Soon after this win Dartford transferred Riley Cullum and Fred Alexander to Charlton Athletic for £6,000, which wiped out the club's debts entirely.

Dartford's first post-war manager had been Warney Cresswell (ex-Everton and England) but poor results led to him being rapidly replaced by Bill Moss who gradually put some stability into the club's playing performances. In the late 1950s the Southern League was totally reorganised and Dartford spent most of the ensuing twenty seasons in the Premier Division. The key managers of the era were George Green, Alf Ackerman and Ernie Morgan, each of whom bring extensive Football League experience to the club resulting in a reasonable level of respectability to the playing side affairs.

=== 1970s ===
In the early 1970s Dartford appeared in four successive Kent Senior Cup finals, winning the first and the last. Around this time, the club acquired the services of ex-Bolton Wanderers and England winger Doug Holden as manager. Doug laid down the foundations of the team, which won the Southern League Championship in 1973–74, though they failed to gain election to the Football League. This is their most recent serious attempt to gain Football League status.

Holden left before the start of that season and was replaced by Ernie Morgan who grafted three or four quality players on to Holden's squad and steered the Darts to the Southern League title and a place in the FA Trophy final at Wembley. For the next few seasons Dartford drifted along and just failed to clinch a spot in the newly formed Alliance Premier League (now the Football Conference). Even though the period was barren by Dartford's standards, the club did win the Southern League Cup for the first time in 1976–77.

=== 1980s ===
Then came the 1980s, a period dominated by two managers with contrasting styles: John Still and Peter Taylor. By winning the Southern Division of the Southern League in 1980–81 Dartford had gained a short-lived place in the Alliance Premier League. Relegated after just one season but having tasted life at the top of the semi-professional game Dartford wanted more. John Still who had led Leytonstone/Ilford to a clean sweep of trophies, was the man for the job, in 1983–84 he steered Dartford to a fourth Southern League Championship and a resultant return to the Alliance Premier League. This time Darts stayed two seasons finishing third in 1984–85. Another periodic crisis was looming, and with Still departing in February 1986, Dartford were relegated once again.

In summer 1986 former Tottenham and England winger Peter Taylor took charge of the club. In the four seasons of his reign Dartford were never out of the top four in the Southern League Premier Division, won the Southern Cup twice (and were denied a unique hat-trick by VS Rugby in the 1989–90 final), the Southern League Championship Trophy twice, the Kent Senior Cup twice and reached the FA Trophy semi-finals twice. In each of his four seasons at Dartford the team scored over one hundred goals – a feat unmatched before or since. In addition Taylor saw average attendances rise from around 450 to almost 1,000.

=== 1990s ===
In the wake of the Bradford City stadium fire and the Hillsborough disaster, Dartford, like so many clubs, needed to either relocate or upgrade their current facilities with the Board going for the latter option. Large sums of money were spent on planning and design fees, which burdened a manageable financial deficit with crippling interest charges.

At the same time Maidstone United, who had sold their own ground, needed a suitable home to launch the ill-fated foray into the Football League and the Dartford board agreed to let Maidstone ground-share at Watling Street, the rent income providing a welcome boost for finances. The ground share began at the start of the 1988–89 season, at the end of which Maidstone reached the Football League as Football Conference champions.

However, Maidstone United went bankrupt and had to resign from the league in August 1992, most of their cash being taken up to gain the eagerly sought Football League place. Ground improvements, which Maidstone United had paid for, were sold to Dartford at a cost (around £500,000), which pushed Darts' debts beyond manageable proportions. Watling Street was sold to pay off creditors and Dartford withdrew from the Southern League four games into the 1992–93 season.

The club's Supporters' Association, around 400 strong, came to the rescue. A private limited liability company was incorporated in November 1992 to manage affairs which meant, primarily, keeping the Youth team operating, an action which was rewarded when the Youth team beat Maidstone Invicta (the club rising out of the ashes of the old United Club) in the final of the John Ullman cup by 2–0 at Gravesend & Northfleet before a gate of 562. The contributing existence of the Youth team enabled Dartford to maintain both its Senior status and Full Membership of the Football Association. In February 1993 former player Tony Burman was appointed Manager and with the club being offered a ground-share arrangement by Cray Wanderers Dartford were able to make a successful application for membership of the Kent League. Spurred on by an average attendance of well over 300 Dartford finished that first season in sixth position.

==== Home from Home: Erith ====
With a view to the future, Dartford negotiated a ground-share with Erith and Belvedere and played home games at the Park View ground from the 1994–95 season. The club finished mid-table, but did reach the final of the Kent League Cup.

The following season saw Dartford involved in a season-long battle with Furness for the Division One title. Dartford lost only one league game all season. It came at the last fixture of the season – away to Furness – to decide which of the two teams would win promotion. The home side held on to a 1–1 draw to deny Dartford the title on goal difference. Dartford were winners of the Kent Senior Trophy, having beaten Chatham Town 3–0 at Welling United's ground, whilst the newly formed reserves team carried off a (South London Federation) League and Cup 'double' under the guidance of former Dart Gary Julians.

In May 1996, Dartford gained promotion to the Southern League, exactly one hundred years after the club first entered that competition. Manager Tony Burman was forced to resign in December due to business commitments but the club quickly promoted reserve team manager Gary Julians to the role.

==== Home from Home: Thurrock ====
In September 1997 a disastrous fire at Erith & Belvedere's Park View ground put the club's future and standing with the Southern League into serious doubt. A new ground sharing arrangement was made with Purfleet in time for the 1998–99 season. The season saw the Youth team, under the guidance of Grant Spelling and Simon Halsey, win the Northern Section title after a play-off penalty shoot-out with Welling United and reach the finals of the Kent Youth League Cup and Kent County Cup.

The 1999–2000 season saw the Darts reach the semi-final of the Kent Senior Cup and the reserves reach the same stage of the Kent Intermediate cup. The club remained in the Southern League for the following three seasons, with the best performance in 1999–2000 when the club finished eighth.

=== 2000s ===
==== Home from Home: Gravesend ====
The club moved closer to the borough with a new arrangement to play home matches at Gravesend & Northfleet's (now Ebbsfleet United) Stonebridge Road ground from the 2000–2001 season. In November 2001, the club parted company with Manager Gary Julians and Coach Micky Crower. Former manager and player Tony Burman returned to the club as caretaker manager to be assisted by former captain and player Paul Sawyer. With Dartford languishing in the relegation zone, Tommy Sampson, who had played over 200 games for Dartford during the five-year period 1975–80, was appointed as the new manager the following month. He was assisted by Martin Farnie and Paul Sawyer. In early 2002 long time Dartford favourite Steve Robinson returned to the club as reserve team player manager. Many changes were to follow on the playing front and by the end of the season Dartford had finished in a very creditable eighth position and in doing so were the highest-placed Kent club in the Dr Martens Eastern Division. The reserves too had a very good season, winning the Northern section of Kent League Division One. In a play-off for the overall winners of Division One, the Darts missed out on the title by losing after extra time to Dover Athletic Reserves.

The ground-sharing agreement at Gravesend & Northfleet, coupled with an upturn in performances on the field, saw a significant increase in attendances to help the financial position of the club. Season 2002–03 saw a further expansion of the playing side with the addition of an Under-16 side in the Kent Youth League, thus making the progression of players from Under-16 level to the senior squad possible. The decision paid off as the team achieved a league and cup double. The Under-18 team were runners-up in the Central Division.

==== Return to Dartford ====
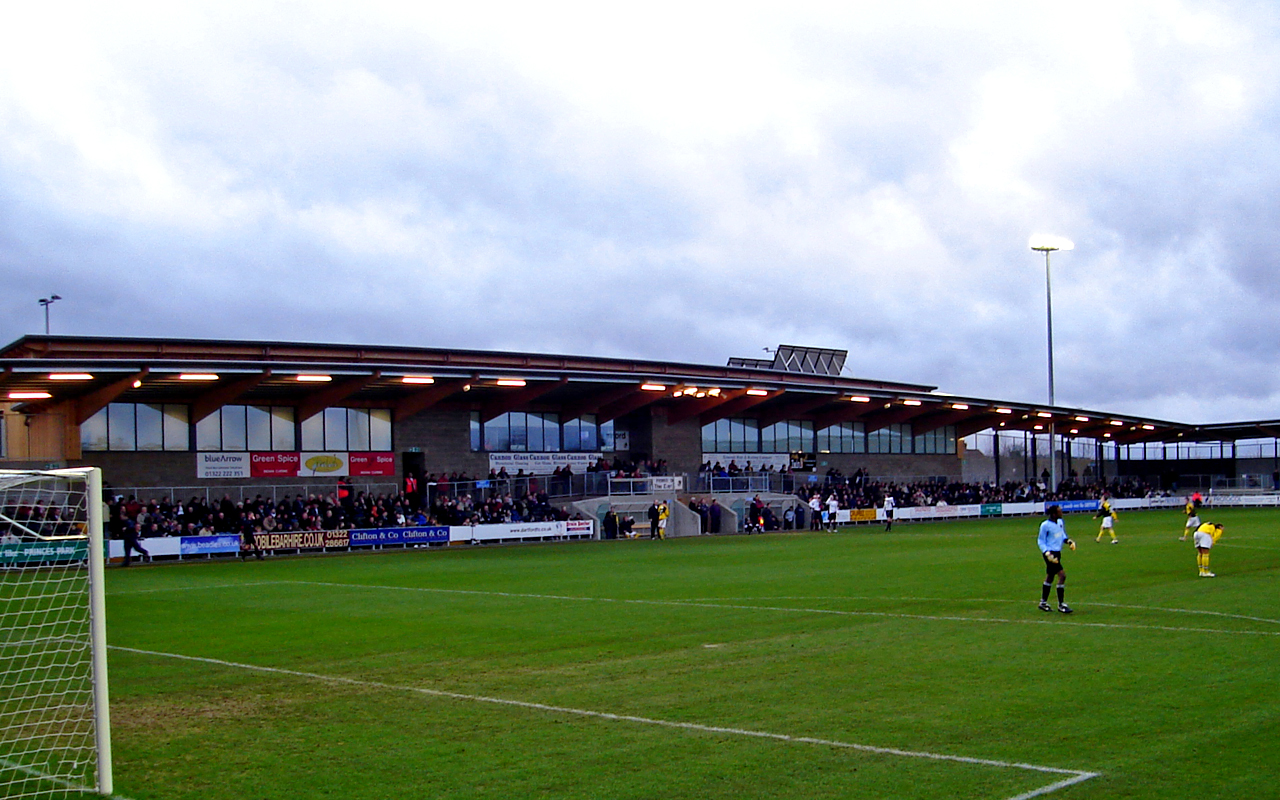
Princes Park in 2007

The 2003–04 season saw the first team finish in 16th position in the Eastern Division but the news that everybody had been waiting for came on 10 April 2004 when Dartford Borough Council announced it would provide funding and a site for the building of a stadium in Dartford in time for the 2006–07 season. Construction work began on 14 November 2005. The 2004–05 season saw the restructuring of non-league football. Dartford remained in the Southern League in a division made up of largely teams from the Isthmian League. The season as a whole was disappointing with the Darts on the edge of the relegation zone for much of the season. Manager Tommy Sampson left the club towards the end of January and director and former player and manager Tony Burman took over on a caretaker basis. An early upsurge in results pulled the Darts away from the relegation zone to retain their Southern League status. Meanwhile, the Reserves under the managership of Bob Pittaway improved on the previous season's poor performances. An influx of players previously under Bob's guidance at Tonbridge Angels and several youth team players from the previous season's Under-18s helped the team achieve a creditable mid-table position. Dartford finished the 2005–06 season in seventh place. Following the second stage of restructuring the non-League football system, the club moved into the Isthmian League Division One South.

Dartford played their first game at new stadium Princes Park on 11 November 2006, less than twelve months after building work began. They beat Horsham YMCA 4–2 in front of an all ticket capacity crowd of 4,097. On 20 July 2007 Dartford hosted Crystal Palace in a friendly match at Princes Park as part of Dave Martin's transfer to the Eagles. The game ended in Crystal Palace winning 3–0 in front of a sold-out crowd of 4,097, exactly the same attendance as the first game played at Princes Park. After a strong season, including an undefeated run of 21 matches, they finished as champions, securing automatic promotion to the Isthmian League Premier Division.

Dartford finished their first season back in the Isthmian Premier (2008–09) in 8th position thanks to a 90th-minute strike by Richard O'Reilly. The following season the "Darts" won the title on 10 April 2010 when they beat Kingstonian, who were at that point the team in second place, 6–2 away. They won the title with six games to spare & began the 2010–11 season in the Conference South. In the 2010–11 season, Dartford finished tenth in the league after a turbulent Christmas which saw them in the relegation zone. They won the Kent Senior Cup for the tenth time against Bromley at Princes Park after a coin-toss decided the venue of the final. It ended 4–1, with Bradbrook, Hayes, Harris and an own goal giving them victory. The 2011–12 season saw Darts hovering around the top 5 up until Christmas, being 14 points behind leaders Woking. Starting with the new year victory over Welling, The Darts amassed 49 points from 21 games (fifteen wins, four draws and two defeats) at one stage closing the gap on Woking to only five points, eventually finishing on 88 points, nine short of the title.

They then played Basingstoke Town over two legs in the play-off semi-final, winning both games, 1–0 and 2–1. On 13 May 2012, Dartford beat Welling United 1–0 at Princes Park in the Conference South league play-off in front of a sellout crowd of 4,088, and returned to the Conference Premier for 2012–13. The 2012–13 season saw Dartford surprise many of the top full-time clubs, recording wins against eventual champions Mansfield Town, Kidderminster Harriers, Wrexham, Newport County, Grimsby Town, Hereford United, and a memorable double over Luton Town. Despite this, the Darts failed to perform well against the bottom half sides, losing to ten of the sixteen teams that finished below them, therefore finishing 8th in their return to the Conference Premier. Dartford had a poor 2013–14 season and finished 22nd, relegating them to the Conference South after two years. However, Salisbury City were demoted to the Conference South on 13 June 2014 after missing a deadline for paying their debts. With Hereford United having already been expelled from the Football Conference for the same reason, Dartford therefore became the second team (alongside Chester) to be reprieved from relegation.

But after a season drifting in and out of the bottom four, Dartford got relegated to the renamed National League South. In the 2017–18 season, Dartford narrowly missed out on automatic promotion via goal difference to Havant & Waterlooville. They played Braintree Town in the play-off semi-final and lost 1–0. It was announced after the play-off that Tony Burman and his management team would step down from their managerial positions. A few days later ex-players Adam Flanagan and Jamie Coyle were confirmed as the new Dartford joint-managers. The 2019–20 season saw managers Adam Flanagan and Jamie Coyle removed from their position. On 10 October, Steve King was announced as the new manager of the club on a three-year deal. Having taken the job with the team in the bottom four, King went on to guide Dartford to the play-off final, which saw Dartford lose on penalties to Weymouth.

In the 2022–23 season, Dartford finished as runners-up in the National League South but lost on penalties in the play-off semi-finals against St Albans City. The following season saw the club relegated to the Isthmian Premier League.

== Players ==
=== Current squad ===
As of 22 November 2026

Note: Flags indicate national team as defined under FIFA eligibility rules; some limited exceptions apply. Players may hold more than one non-FIFA nationality.

No.	Pos.	Nation	Player
1	GK	ENG	Ryan Sandford
2	DF	ENG	Emmanuel Oke
3	DF	ENG	Sam Odaudu
4	DF	ENG	Ben Swift (captain)
5	DF	ENG	Joe Tennent
6	DF	ENG	George Whitefield
8	MF	ENG	Scott Wagstaff
9	FW	ENG	Dan Smith
10	FW	ENG	Max Fiddes
11	MF	ENG	Ben Greenhalgh
12	DF	ENG	Adrian Gyamera

No.	Pos.	Nation	Player
14	MF	ENG	Brandon Davey
16	MF	ENG	Jordan Higgs
18	FW	AUS	Matthew MacArthur
19	DF	ENG	Luke Exall
20	FW	ENG	Louie Atkins
21	MF	ENG	Sonny Smith
26	MF	ENG	Tyler Ibe
27	DF	ENG	Ikechukwu Orji
28	MF	ENG	Jeremiah Pinder
33	FW	ENG	Ashdon Day (from Sutton Athletic - dual registration)
—	MF	ENG	George Brooke

=== Out on loan ===
Note: Flags indicate national team as defined under FIFA eligibility rules; some limited exceptions apply. Players may hold more than one non-FIFA nationality.

No.	Pos.	Nation	Player
13	GK	ENG	Carter Sullivan (at Sittingbourne)
15	MF	ENG	Richie Atkins (at Hashtag United)

No.	Pos.	Nation	Player
23	DF	ENG	Kai Jeffrey (at Hollands & Blair - dual registration)
—	DF	ENG	Hugo Taylor (at Sutton Athletic)

== Club officials ==
=== Dartford FC (1992) Limited ===
Chairman: Steve Irving
President: Bill Archer
Directors: Bob Blair; Mark Brenlund; Tony Burman; Harry Extance; Norman Grimes
Company Secretary: David Boswell
Football Secretary: Peter Martin
Operations Manager: Jack Smedley
Front of House: Hayley Thomas
Associate Director of PR and Communications: Gareth Morgan
Programme Editor: David Shafford

=== Dartford Football Club Supporters Association ===
Chairman: Michael How
Vice-chairman: Scott McKinnon
Treasurer: Geoff Ashburn
Secretary: Gary Clark

N.B. None of the supporters association officials are officials of Dartford Football Club.

=== Football Management ===
Manager: Ben Greenhalgh
Assistant Manager: Adam Flanagan
First-Team Coach: Elliot Leveson
First-Team Coach: Paul Sawyer
Goalkeeping Coach: Bailey Vose
Strength and Conditioning Coach: Graham Day
Head of Scouting: Steve Miller
Kit Man and Logistics: Terry Groom
Doctor: Richard Dunn
Head Physio: David Phillips
Physio: Rhiannon Green

== Seasons ==
Statistics from the last decade

Year	League	Level	Pld	W	D	L	GF	GA	GD	Pts	Position	Leading league scorer	League goals	FA Cup	FA Trophy	Average league attendance
2017–18	National League South	6	42	26	8	8	81	44	+37	86	2nd of 22	Alfie Pavey	22	R1	R1	1,021
2018–19	National League South	6	42	18	10	14	52	58	-6	64	10th of 22	Charlie Sheringham	9	QR3	QR3	1,134
2019–20	National League South	6	34	16	8	10	60	46	+14	56	6th of 22	Darren McQueen	16	QR4	QR3	1,183 (after 18 of 21 games)
2020–21	National League South	6	19	10	4	5	26	17	+9	34	2nd of 21	Jacob Berkeley-Agyepong	5	QR2	R3	0 (after 12 of 20 games)
2021–22	National League South	6	40	21	11	8	75	42	+33	74	4th of 21	Marcus Dinanga	13	QR4	R5	1,338
2022–23	National League South	6	46	25	8	13	82	50	+32	83	2nd of 24	Alex Wall	11	QR2	R2	1,178
2023–24	National League South	6	46	12	10	24	56	75	-19	46	21st of 24; Relegated	Luke Coulson	10	QR2	R2	1,055
2024–25	Isthmian League Premier Division	7	42	25	9	8	77	49	+28	84	3rd of 22	Callum Jones	13	QR3	QR3	1,138
2025–26	Isthmian League Premier Division	7	42	20	12	10	81	55	+26	72	6th of 22	Olly Box	16	QR1	QR3	1,067
2026–27	Isthmian League Premier Division	7	18	12	0	6	32	23	+8	36	3rd of 22	Dan Smith	9	QR3	TBC	1,059 (after 9 of 21 games)

== Honours ==
Dartford, historically, are the most successful club that played in the National League South followed by rivals Bath City.

League

- Southern League / National League South (level 6)
  - Champions: 1983–84
  - Play-off winners: 2012
- Isthmian League Premier (level 7)
  - Champions: 2009–10
- Southern League Division One (level 7)
  - Champions: 1980–81
- Isthmian League Division One North (level 8)
  - Champions: 2007–08
- Southern League Division Two
  - Champions: 1896–97
- Southern League
  - Champions: 1930–31, 1931–32
- Southern League
  - Champions: 1973–74

Cup

- FA Trophy
  - Runners-up: 1973–74
- Southern League Cup
  - Winners: 1977, 1988, 1989
- Kent Senior Cup
  - Winners (13): 1930–31, 1931–32, 1932–33, 1934–35, 1946–47, 1967–70, 1972–73, 1986–87, 1987–88, 2010–11, 2015–16, 2019–20, 2021–22
- Kent Senior Trophy
  - Winners: 1995–96
- Kent League Cup
  - Winners: 1924–25
- Southern League Championship Match
  - Winners: 1983–84, 1987–88, 1988–89
- Inter-League Challenge Match
  - Winners: 1973–74

== Club records ==
- Highest league position:
  - First in Southern league, 1930–31, 1931–32
- FA Cup best performance:
  - Third round: 1935–36, 1936–37
- FA Trophy best performance:
  - Runner-up: 1973–74
- FA Vase best performance:
  - First round: 1994–95
