= Tony Burman (footballer) =

English footballer and manager (born 1958)

Personal information
- Full name: Anthony Paul Burman
- Date of birth: 3 June 1958 (age 68)
- Place of birth: Stockwell, England
- Position: Forward

Youth career
- Queens Park Rangers

Senior career*
Years	Team	Apps	(Gls)
1976–1979	Charlton Athletic	19	(3)
1979–1987	Dartford	490	(159)
	Leytonstone & Ilford	?	(?)
	Bromley	?	(?)
	Erith & Belvedere	?	(?)

Managerial career
- 1993–1996: Dartford
- 2005–2018: Dartford
- 2019: Dartford (interim)
- 2024: Dartford (interim)
- * Club domestic league appearances and goals

Anthony Paul Burman (born 3 June 1958) is an English semi-professional football manager and former player. He was last the interim manager of National League South club Dartford in 2024.
